= List of political parties in Moldova =

This article lists a series of political parties, both historical and contemporary as well as active and inactive, from the Republic of Moldova. The Republic of Moldova is a multi-party parliamentary republic with a unicameral system. As of 2025, in Moldova, there are 66 political parties that have been formally registered.

== Parliamentary parties ==
Party	Abbr.	Founded	Ideology	Political position	Leader	MPs
Party of Action and Solidarity; Partidul Acțiune și Solidaritate	PAS	2016	Liberalism (Moldovan); Pro-Europeanism	Centre-right	Igor Grosu	55 / 101 (Note: Including 19 independents elected on the PAS list)
Party of Socialists of the Republic of Moldova; Partidul Socialiștilor din Republica Moldova	PSRM	1997	Democratic socialism Socialism; Social conservatism Moldovenism; Russophilia; Euroscepticism	Left-wing	Igor Dodon	17 / 101
Party of Communists of the Republic of Moldova; Partidul Comuniștilor din Republica Moldova	PCRM	1993	Communism; Marxism–Leninism; Left-conservatism; Moldovenism; Russophilia; Soviet patriotism; Euroscepticism	Far-left	Diana Caraman	8 / 101
Our Party; Partidul Nostru	PN	1999	Left-wing populism Social conservatism Moldovenism; Soft Euroscepticism; Soft Russophilia	Left-wing	Renato Usatîi	6 / 101 (Note: Including one independent elected on the PN list)
Democracy at Home Party; Partidul Democrația Acasă	PPDA	2011	Right-wing populism Moldovan–Romanian unionism Pro-Europeanism	Right-wing	Vasile Costiuc	6 / 101
National Alternative Movement; Mișcarea Alternativa Națională	MAN	2022	Social democracy; Social democracy Pro-Europeanism (Note: Alternative's true commitment to pro-Europeanism is questioned by multiple media sources and political analysts) (claimed; disputed) Russophilia (alleged)	Centre	Ion Ceban	3 / 101
Party of Development and Consolidation of Moldova; Partidul Dezvoltării și Consolidării Moldovei	PDCM	2021	Christian democracy Pro-Europeanism (claimed)	Centre to centre-right	Ion Chicu	2 / 101
Common Action Party – Civil Congress; Partidul Acțiunii Comune – Congresul Civic	PAC–CC	2019	Democratic socialism Progressivism; Social justice Euroscepticism; Pro-Europeanism (claimed)	Left-wing	Iurie Muntean; Mark Tkachuk	1 / 101
Future of Moldova Party; Partidul Viitorul Moldovei	PVM	2022	Left-wing populism Left-wing nationalism Russophilia	Left-wing	Vasile Tarlev	1 / 101

== Main non-parliamentary parties ==
Party	Abbr.	Founded	Ideology	Political position	Leader	Note
Dignity and Truth Platform; Platforma Demnitate și Adevăr	PPDA	2013	Liberalism; Anti-corruption; Pro-Europeanism	Centre-right	Liviu Vovc	Withdrew in favour of PAS
Greater Moldova Party; Partidul Moldova Mare	PMM	2007	Moldovan irredentism; Populism; Russophilia		Victoria Furtună	Barred from running
Heart of Moldova Republican Party; Partidul Republican „Inima Moldovei”	PRIM	2024	Social democracy; Social conservatism; Russophilia	Left-wing	Irina Vlah	Barred from running
Revival Party; Partidul „Renaștere”	PR	2011	Social conservatism; Moldovenism; Russophilia	Left-wing	Natalia Parasca	Barred from running

== Former major parties ==
These parties are still active, but no longer play a significant role in Moldova's political system.

Party		Abbr.	Founded	Ideology	Political position	Leader	Best result
Agrarian Party of Moldova (Note: Formerly known as the Democratic Agrarian Party of Moldova, Partidul Democrat Agrar din Moldova (PDAM).); Partidul Agrar din Moldova	PAM	1991	Agrarianism; Moldovenism; Russophilia	Centre-left		Nicolae Damașcan	56 / 104 (1994)
Liberal Democratic Party of Moldova; Partidul Liberal Democrat din Moldova	PLDM	2007	Conservatism; Pro-Europeanism; Moldovan–Romanian unionism	Centre-right		Vlad Filat	32 / 101 (2010)
European Social Democratic Party (Note: Formerly known as the Democratic Party of Moldova, Partidul Democrat din Moldova (PDM).); Partidul Social Democrat European	PSDE	1997	Social democracy; Left-wing populism; Pro-Europeanism	Centre-left		Vasile Bumacov	30 / 101 (2019)
Liberal Party; Partidul Liberal	PL	1993	Conservative liberalism; Moldovan–Romanian unionism; Pro-Europeanism	Centre-right		Mihai Ghimpu	15 / 101 (2009)
Christian-Democratic People's Party (Note: Formerly known as the Christian Democratic Popular Front, Frontul Popular Creștin Democrat (FPCD)); Partidul Popular Creștin Democrat	PPCD	1989	Christian democracy; Russophilia; Moldovan–Romanian unionism (formerly)	Right-wing to far-right		Victor Ciobanu	11 / 101 (2001–5)

== Minor parties ==
Party	Abbr.	Founded	Ideology	Political position	Leader	Notes
Alliance for the Union of Romanians; Alianța pentru Unirea Românilor	AUR	2019	Moldovan–Romanian unionism; Romanian nationalism; Right-wing populism; Christian right	Right-wing to far-right	Boris Volosatîi (Moldova); George Simion (Romania)	Mainly active in Romania
Christian-Social Union of Moldova; Uniunea Creștin-Socială din Moldova	UCSM	1996	Christian democracy	Centre-left	Gabriel Călin	Formerly known as the New Force Social-Political Movement
Centrist Union of Moldova; Uniunea Centristă din Moldova	UCM	2000	Social democracy	Centre-left	Mihai Petrache	
Alliance of Liberals and Democrats for Europe; Alianța Liberalilor și Democraților pentru Europa	ALDE	2011	Social liberalism; Pro-Europeanism		Arina Spătaru	Formerly known as the Democratic Action Party
Ecologist Green Party; Partidul Verde Ecologist	PVE	1992	Green politics; Social democracy; Progressivism; Pro-Europeanism	Centre-left	Anatolie Prohnițchi	Formerly known as the Ecologist Party of Moldova "Green Alliance"
Romanian Popular Party; Partidul Popular Românesc	PPR	2013	Liberalism; Moldovan–Romanian unionism	Centre-right	Vlad Țurcanu	
Labour Party; Partidul Muncii	PM	1999	Socialism; Russophilia	Left-wing	Marcel Darie	
Movement of Professionals "Hope"; Mișcarea profeșionistilor "Speranța-Nadejda"	MPSN	1997	Anti-corruption	Centre-left	Andrei Donica	
National Liberal Party; Partidul Național Liberal	PNL	1993	National liberalism; Conservative liberalism; Moldovan–Romanian unionism; Pro-Europeanism	Centre-right	Mihai Severovan (acting)	
New Historical Option; Noua Opțiune Istorică	NOI	2021	Social democracy; Christian democracy; Anti-communism	Centre-left	Svetlana Chesari	
Party of Law and Justice; Partidul Legii și Dreptății	PLD	1997	Christian democracy		Nicolae Alexei	
Party of Regions of Moldova; Partidul Regiunilor din Moldova	PRM	2011	Social democracy; Conservatism; Euroscepticism; Russophilia	Centre-left	Alexandr Kalinin	
People's Party of the Republic of Moldova; Partidul Popular din Republica Moldova	PPRM	2011	Social democracy; Popularism; Populism; Pro-Europeanism	Centre-left	Alexandru Oleinic	
Republican Party of Moldova; Partidul Republican din Moldova	PRM	1999			Andrei Stratan	
Social Democratic Party; Partidul Social-Democrat	PSD	1990	Social democracy	Centre-left	Victor Șelin	
Socialist Party of Moldova; Partidul Socialist din Moldova	PSM	1992	Socialism; Russophilia	Left-wing	Vladimir Dorojko	
Social-Political Movement of the Roma; Mişcarea social-politică a Romilor	MSPR	2010	Romani minority interests			
Working People's Party; Partidului Oamenilor Muncii	POM	1998	Social democracy	Centre-left	Serghei Toma	Formerly known as the New National Moldovan Party

- Alternative and Salvation Force of Moldova (Forța de Alternativă și de Salvare a Moldovei)
- Christian Agrarian Party (Partidul Creștin Agrar)
- Conservative Party (Partidul Conservator)
- European Party (Partidul European)
- Motherland Party (Partidul „Patria”)
- Party "Our Home – Moldova" (Partidul „Casa Noastră — Moldova”)
- Party "Patriots of Moldova" (Partidul „Patrioţii Moldovei”)
- Party "The Will of the People" (Partidul „Voința Poporului”)
- People's Democratic Party of Moldova (Partidul Popular Democrat din Moldova)
- People's Movement Antimafia (Mișcarea Populară Antimafie)
- Progressive Society Party (Partidul Societăţii Progresiste)
- Russo-Slavic Party of Moldova (Partidul Ruso-Slavean din Moldova)
- United Moldova Party (Partidul „Moldova Unită — Единая Молдова”)
- Victory (Partidul Politic “Victorie”)
- We Build Europe at Home Party (Partidul Acasă Construim Europa)

== Former parties ==
Party	Abbr.	Ideology	Political position	Leader	Years active
Chance Political Party; Partidul Politic „Șansă”	PPȘ	Christian democracy; Social democracy; Russophilia	Centre-left	Alexei Lungu	2020-2026
ȘOR Party; Partidul „ȘOR”	ȘOR	National conservatism; Russophilia; Populism; Social conservatism; Social democracy; Hard Euroscepticism	Syncretic	Ilan Shor	1998–2023
Communist Reformers Party of Moldova; Partidul Comunist Reformator din Moldova	PCR	Communism	Left-wing	Ruslan Popa	2014–2015
Save Bessarabia Union; Uniunea Salvați Basarabia	USB	Conservatism; Moldovan–Romanian unionism; Christian democracy		Valeriu Munteanu	2006–2021
Our Moldova Alliance; Alianța „Moldova Noastră”	AMN	Social liberalism		Serafim Urechean	2003–2011

- Social Liberal Party (Partidul Social-Liberal), formerly the Christian Democratic League of Women, (Liga Creştin Democrată a Femeielor), years active 2001–2008, merged into Democratic Party of Moldova.
- Social Democracy Party (Partidul Democrației Sociale), years active 2006–2007, merged with the Social Democratic Party of Moldova.

== Historical political parties ==
- Bessarabian Peasants' Party (Partidul Țărănesc din Basarabia)
- Communist Party of Moldova (Partidul Comunist al Moldovei)
- Democratic Agrarian Party (Partidul Democrat Agrar)
- Democratic Union of Freedom (Uniunea Democratică a Libertăţii)
- Freedom Party, Bessarabia (Partidul Libertăţii)
- Gagauz Khalky (Poporul Găgăuz), Gagauz separatist, now outlawed
- Moldavian Progressive Party (Partidul Progresist Moldovenesc)
- National Moldavian Party (Partidul Național Moldovenesc)
- National Patriotic Front (Partidul Național Patriotic)

== Party alliances ==
=== Active ===
Alliance	Abbr.	Founded	Ideology	Political position	Member parties	Former members
Together; Blocul „Împreună”	BÎ	2024	Liberalism; Anti-corruption; Pro-Europeanism	Centre-right	PS, PVE	PPDA, LOC, CUB
Victory; Blocul „Victorie”	BV	2024	Russophilia; Moldovenism; Hard Euroscepticism	Left-wing	PR, PPȘ, FASM, PPV	ȘOR (banned)

=== Defunct ===
- Alliance for Democracy and Reforms
- Alliance for European Integration
- Alliance for European Integration III
- Alliance of the Christian Democratic Popular Front
- Alternative
- Bloc of Communists and Socialists
- Bloc of Peasants and Intellectuals
- Braghiș Alliance
- Chance. Duties. Realization.
- Democratic Convention of Moldova
- Electoral Bloc Democratic Moldova
- Electoral Bloc Motherland
- For a Democratic and Prosperous Moldova
- NOW Platform DA and PAS
- Patriotic Electoral Bloc
- Political Alliance for a European Moldova
- Pro-European Coalition
- Union Political Movement

== Political camps ==
Two major movements have developed in the recent years in Moldovan politics and they can be distinguished as follows:

- On the one hand, a pro-Western world, pro-Moldovan–Romanian unionism, and pro-European, generally comprising conservative liberals.
- On the other hand, a Russophilian, pro-communist or pro-Usatîi, generally Eurosceptic, and often anti-American and strongly anti-liberal group of parties.

Political camps
Pro-Western and pro-European (generally liberal)	Pro-Russian and Eurosceptic (often anti-American and strongly anti-liberal)
Alliance of Liberals and Democrats for Europe European Social Democratic Party Dignity and Truth Platform European People's Party of Moldova Liberal Democratic Party of Moldova Liberal Party Romanian Popular Party National Liberal Party Party of Action and Solidarity	Christian-Democratic People's Party Our Party Party of Communists of the Republic of Moldova Party of Socialists of the Republic of Moldova Socialist Party of Moldova Agrarian Party of Moldova ȘOR Party

== See also ==
- List of political parties in Romania
- List of political parties in Transnistria
- Lists of political parties
- List of ruling political parties by country
