= History of independent Moldova =

The following is timeline of the History of independent Moldova which started after the independence of Moldova.

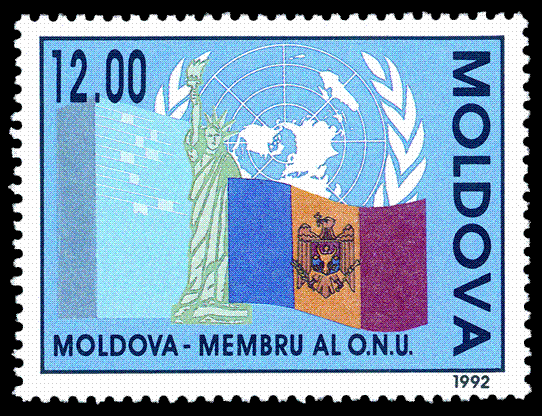
1992 stamp

== Road to independence 1985–1991 ==
In the new political conditions created after 1985 by the glasnost policy introduced by Mikhail Gorbachev, in 1986, to support the perestroika (restructuring), a Democratic Movement of Moldova (Romanian: Mişcarea Democratică din Moldova) was formed, which in 1989 became known as the pro-nationalist Popular Front of Moldova (PFM; Romanian: Frontul Popular din Moldova). Along with the other peripheral Soviet republics, from 1988 onwards, Moldova started to move towards independence. On 29 July 1989 a pro-reform Communist Mircea Snegur was appointed Chairman of the Presidium of Supreme Soviet of Moldavia (Speaker of the Parliament). On 27 August 1989, the PFM organized a mass demonstration in Chișinău, that became known as the Great National Gathering (Romanian: Marea Adunare Naţională), which pressured the authorities of the Moldavian Soviet Socialist Republic to adopt on 31 August 1989 a language law that proclaimed the Moldovan language written in the Latin script to be the state language of the Moldavian SSR.Civil unrest began on 7 November 1989, in Chișinău, Moldavian SSR and continued on 10 November, when protesters burned down the headquarters of the Ministry of Internal Affairs, led by Vladimir Voronin. Festivals on 7 November 1989 commemorating the October Revolution and 10 November celebrating the Soviet police force offered excellent opportunities for opposition to challenge authorities in highly visible settings and disrupt events of premiere importance to the Soviet regime. Popular Front of Moldova activists, often going beyond the official sanction of the movement leadership, organized actions that embarrassed the republican leadership, ultimately resulted in riots in central Chişinău. This unrest sealed the fate of the increasingly weak First Secretary of the Communist Party of Moldova. At the end of a year that had seen Semion Grossu and his organization pummeled from both the national revivalist right and the "ultrarevolutionary" internationalist left, Moscow replaced the First Secretary with Petru Lucinschi in a snap Central Committee plenum on 16 November 1989.

The first partly free elections into the Moldovan parliament were held in February and March 1990. On 27 April 1990 pro-reform Communist Mircea Snegur was re-elected as Speaker of the Parliament (Chairman of the Supreme Soviet of Moldavia), and on 26 May 1990 Mircea Druc of the Popular Front of Moldova became Prime-Minister in a watershed moment as the CPSU lost power in the Moldavian SSR. On 23 June 1990, the Parliament adopted the Declaration of Sovereignty which among other things stipulated the supremacy of Moldovan laws over those of the Soviet Union, and formally changed the name of the republic from Moldavian SSR to Moldovan SSR. Mircea Snegur was elected president of Moldova on 3 September 1990 by the Parliament and pushes for independence. On 23 May 1991, the name of the state is again changed into the current Republic of Moldova.

After the failure of the 19–21 August 1991 Soviet coup d'état attempt, Moldova declared its independence on 27 August 1991, which was recognized the same day by Romania, and afterwards by numerous other countries. President Mircea Snegur's opposition to immediate reunification with Romania led to a split with the Moldovan Popular Front in October 1991 and to his decision to run as an independent candidate in the 8 December 1991 presidential election. Running unopposed, he won after the Popular Front's efforts to organize a voter boycott failed. On 21 December 1991 Moldova, along with most of the former Soviet republics, signed the constitutive act that formed the post-Soviet Commonwealth of Independent States (CIS). Declaring itself a neutral state, it did not join the military branch of the CIS. Three months later, on 2 March 1992, the country achieved formal recognition as an independent state at the United Nations.

== Transnistrian conflict ==
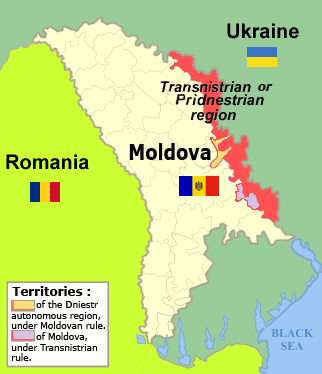
Transnistrian region of Moldova

In 1992, Moldova became involved in a brief conflict against local insurgents in Transnistria, who were aided by the 14th Guards Army and Russian, Ukrainian and Don Cossack volunteers, which resulted in the failure of Moldova, supported by Romania, to regain control over the breakaway republic. A ceasefire for this war was negotiated by presidents Mircea Snegur and Boris Yeltsin in July 1992. A demarcation line was to be maintained by a tripartite peacekeeping force (composed of Moldovan, Russian, and Transnistrian forces), and Moscow agreed to withdraw its 14th Army in parallel with finding a permanent solution for Transnistrian conflict. Also, Transnistria would have a special status within Moldova and would have the right to secede if Moldova changed its statehood, for instance by uniting with Romania. However, in subsequent talks the Transnistrian authorities declined this offer, setting course for continued independence instead. As of 2019, this conflict remains unresolved.

In the region east of the Dniester river, Transnistria, which includes a large proportion of Russophone ethnic Russians and Ukrainians (as of 1989, 51%, as opposed to only 40% ethnic Moldovans), and where the headquarters and many units of the Soviet Guards 14th Army were stationed, an independent "Transdnestrian Moldovan Republic" (TMR) was proclaimed on 16 August 1990, with its capital in Tiraspol. The motives behind this move were fear of the rise of nationalism in Moldova and the country's expected reunification with Romania upon secession from the USSR.

In the winter of 1991–1992 clashes occurred between Transnistrian forces, supported by elements of the 14th Guards Army, and the Moldovan police. Between 2 March and 26 July 1992, the conflict escalated into a military engagement. Negotiations held during the conflict between Russia, Ukraine, Romania, and Moldova did not produce any practical results. After a series of direct negotiations facilitated by Russia, an agreement was reached between Moldova and Transnistria.

Russian military stationed in the region (14th Army) were removed from the main part of Moldova by January 1993, but remain to this day east of the Dniester in the breakaway region, despite signing international obligations to withdraw, and against the will of Moldovan government. One such obligation was undertaken at the 1999 OSCE summit in Istanbul to withdraw the Russian troops and ammunition within 3 years, a promise reiterated at the next summit in Porto in 2003. After 1992, Romania and Ukraine were excluded from the diplomatic activity aimed to solve the Transnistrian crisis. Later, the Organization for Security and Co-operation in Europe (OSCE) was included, and Ukraine was re-included. The postwar status quo remains to this day: Chişinău offers a large autonomy, while Tiraspol demands independence. De jure, Transnistria is internationally recognized as part of Moldova, but de facto, the authorities in Chişinău do not exercise any control over that territory.

== Transition to market economy ==
On 2 January 1992, Moldova introduced the market reforms, of which included price liberalization. This resulted in a 2,600% inflation in 1992, and a further 700% inflation in 1993. From 1992 till 2001, the young country suffered its worst economic crisis that left most of the population below the poverty line. In 1993, a new national currency, the Moldovan leu was introduced to replace the Soviet rouble. The end of the planned economy meant also that the industrial enterprises would have to buy supplies and sell their goods by themselves, and most of the management was not prepared for such a change. Moldova undertook a privatisation plan which was effective in the transfer of the ownership of houses to the people. The attempted privatization of production means did not boost the economy as it was desired. International financial institutions, judging the apparent presence of landmarks indicating a modern developed society in 1992, have overestimated the capacity of Moldova's economy and government to withstand the transition to market economy, and imposed the country to open its market to outside goods without implementation of any effective action to support internal production. As a result, Moldova's industry, especially machine building, became all but defunct, and unemployment skyrocketed. The economic fortunes of Moldova began to change in 2001; since then the country has seen a steady annual growth of between 5% and 10%. Early 2000s also saw a considerable growth of emigration of Moldovans looking for work (mostly illegally) in Italy, Portugal, Spain, Greece, Cyprus, Turkey, and other countries, in addition to work in Russia. One of the reasons for this was that in 1991, 1.3 million Moldovans, or ca. 60% of the workforce, were employed in agriculture, which normally does not require such a large number of people. Remittances from Moldovans abroad account for ca. 30% of Moldova's GDP, the largest percentage in Europe. Officially, Moldova's annual GDP is of the order of $1,000 per capita, however a significant part of the economy goes unregistered due to corruption.

== Political developments in 1990s ==
Moldova's transition to democracy was initially impeded by an ineffective Parliament, the lack of a new constitution, a separatist movement led by the Gagauz (Christian Turkic) minority in the south, who declared the Gagauz Republic, and unrest in the Transnistria region on the left bank of the Dniester river, where a separatist movement assisted by uniformed Russian military forces in the region and led by supporters of the 1991 coup attempt in Moscow declared a "Dniester republic".

Progress has been made on all these fronts. In 1992, the government negotiated a cease-fire arrangement with Russian and Transnistrian officials (although tensions continue) and negotiations are ongoing. In February 1994, new legislative elections were held, and the ineffective Parliament that had been elected in 1990 to a 5-year term was replaced. A new constitution was adopted in July 1994. The Gagauzia conflict was defused by the granting of local autonomy in 1994, which entered into force in 1995.

The pro-nationalist governments of prime-ministers Mircea Druc (25 May 1990 – 28 May 1991), and Valeriu Muravschi (28 May 1991 – 1 July 1992), were followed by a more moderate government of Andrei Sangheli, which saw the removal of most reform-oriented individuals. and the decline of the pro-Romanian nationalist sentiment.

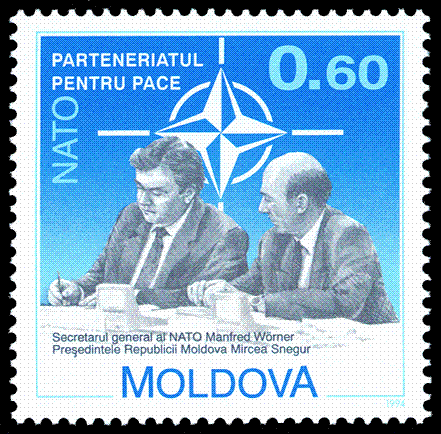
Mircea Snegur and Manfred Wörner signing Moldova's Partnership for Peace with NATO (1994)

In December 1991, an ex-communist reformer, Mircea Snegur, ran an unopposed election for the presidency. On 2 March 1992, the country achieved formal recognition as an independent state at the United Nations. The Soviet system was falling apart quickly, and Moldovan leadership decided to rely on itself to bring the breakaway Transnistria back under its control. In April 1992, the Parliament formed a Ministry of Defense, and Moldova began to organize its own armed forces.

The February 1994 Parliamentary elections were conducted peacefully and received good ratings from international observers for their fairness. Prime Minister Andrei Sangheli was re-elected to his post in March 1994, as was Petru Lucinschi to his post as speaker of the Parliament. Authorities in Transnistria, refused to allow balloting there and discouraged the local population from participating; only some 7,500 inhabitants voted at specially established precincts in right-bank Moldova. Inhabitants of the Gagauz separatist region did participate in the elections, however.

In the February 1994 elections, only four of the dozens of political parties surpassed the 4% threshold. The new Parliament, with its Democratic Agrarian Party of Moldova majority, did not face the same gridlock that characterized the old Parliament with its majority of Popular Front hard-line nationalists. A new government was formed by Andrei Sangheli of the Democratic Agrarian Party.

A March 1994 referendum saw an overwhelming majority of voters favoring continued independence. Following the elections, the Parliament ratified the Commonwealth of Independent States accession treaty, modified the national anthem from Deşteaptă-te, române to Limba noastră, adopted a new constitution that called the official language Moldova as opposed to Romanian (as it was called in 1991–93), and adopted other measures that distanced Moldova from Romania. The new Moldovan Constitution also provided for autonomy for Transnistria and Gagauzia. On 23 December 1994, the Parliament of Moldova adopted a "Law on the Special Legal Status of Gagauzia", and in 1995 it was constituted.

Russia and Moldova signed an agreement in October 1994 on the withdrawal of Russian troops from Transnistria, but the Russian government did not ratify it; another stalemate ensued. Although the cease-fire remained in effect, further negotiations that included the Conference on Security and Cooperation in Europe and the United Nations made little progress.

In 1994, Moldova became a member of NATO Partnership for Peace. On 29 June 1995, Moldova became a member of the Council of Europe.

In March and April 1995, Moldovan college and secondary school students participated in a series of strikes and demonstrations in Chişinău to protest the government's cultural and educational policies. The students were joined by others protesting for economic reasons. The most emotional issue was that of the national language – whether it should be called Moldovan, as named in the 1994 constitution, or Romanian.

In a 27 April speech to the Parliament, President Snegur asked the Parliament to amend the constitution and change the name of the language to Romanian. The government's final decision was postponed until the fall of 1995 because of the stipulation that six months must pass before a proposed change to the constitution can be made. The student demonstrators declared a moratorium on further strikes until 6 September.

The 1996 attempt by President Snegur to change the official language to "Romanian" was dismissed by the Moldovan Parliament as "promoting Romanian expansionism".

In the presidential elections of 1996, parliamentary speaker Petru Lucinschi surprised with an upset victory over the incumbent, Mircea Snegur, in a second round of balloting. The elections were judged as free and fair by international observers. After winning the presidential elections of 1996, on 15 January 1997, Petru Lucinschi, the former First Secretary of the Moldavian Communist Party in 1989-91 became the country's second president.

President Lucinschi did manage to institute some very controversial reforms (perhaps the United States Assistance for International Development-funded "Pămînt" land privatization program was the most controversial). Indeed, his tenure was marked by constant legislative struggles with Moldova's Parliament. Several times, the Parliament considered votes of no confidence in the president's government, and a succession of moderate, pro-Western reform prime ministers were dismissed by a Parliament that increasingly favored the growing Communist Party faction.

The Partnership and Cooperation Agreement with the European Union (EU) came into force in July 1998 for an initial period of ten years. It established the institutional framework for bilateral relations, set the principal common objectives, and called for activities and dialogue in a number of policy areas.

At the 1999 OSCE summit, Russia signed an agreement to withdraw its troops from Transnistria by 1 January 2002. However, it has yet to follow through on this pledge.

Moldova's previous two presidents, Mircea Snegur and Petru Lucinschi were respectively President of the Republican Supreme Soviet and Republican Communist Party First Secretary during the Soviet Period. Both served as Politburo members, and Luchinschi was a member of the CC of CPSU.

== Alliance for Democracy and Reforms 1998–2001 ==
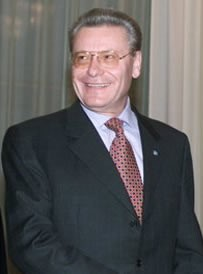
Petru Lucinschi, Moldova's second president (1996–2001)

After winning the presidential elections of 1996, on 15 January 1997, Petru Lucinschi, the former First Secretary of the Moldavian Communist Party in 1989–91, became the country's second president.

At the legislative elections on 22 March 1998, the Party of Communists of the Republic of Moldova, which was re-legalized in 1994 after being banned in 1991, gained 40 of the 101 places in the Parliament, but was reduced to opposition when an Alliance for Democracy and Reforms was formed by the Democratic Convention of Moldova (26 MPs), Movement for a democratic and Prosperous Moldova (24 MPs), and Party of Democratic Forces (11 MPs). However, activity of the new government of prime-minister Ion Ciubuc (24 January 1997 – 1 February 1999), was marked by chronic political instability, which prevented a coherent reform program. The Alliance for Democracy and Reforms was the first coalition government in the history of Moldova. Foreign policy was marked by a duality of belonging to the Commonwealth of Independent States and steps towards a rapprochement with Western Europe.

The rouble crisis of 1998 in Russia, Moldova's main economic partner at the time, produced an economic crisis in the country.

Moldova received an International Monetary Fund special mission advising the government on how to cope with the effects of the Russian crisis. Russia bought at that time 85% of Moldova's wine and brandy and most of its canned goods and tobacco. After the rouble crashed, most Russian importers put deals with Moldova on hold. Moldovan president Petru Lucinschi was quoted as saying that the Russian crisis had cost Moldova as much as five per cent of its GDP. The country's parliament was discussing a programme aimed at reducing imports and searching for new markets outside Russia.

Privatization was stalled, the Moldovan leu lost 60% with respect to the US dollar within a year (August 1998-July 1999), an energy crisis swept through the country, wages and pensions were paid with a considerable delay of several months, corruption extended. The level of life plunged, with 75% of population living below the poverty line, while the economic disaster caused 600,000 people to leave the country. This eventually resulted in the interruption of relations with the International Monetary Fund.

In economic terms, the 1998 crisis provoked an emigration of labor, as well as permanent emigration from Moldova. According to the census data, from 1989 to 2004, Moldova has lost about 400,000 inhabitants, or 9% of the population. Analysts estimate that actual emigration could be higher, as many seasonal workers remain registered as living in the country.

After the acting government of Serafim Urechean (5–17 February 1999), new governments were formed by Ion Sturza ( 19 – 9 February November 1999) and Dumitru Braghiş (21 December 1999 – 19 April 2001). On 21 July 2000, the Parliament adopted an amendment to the Constitution that transformed Moldova from a presidential to a parliamentary republic, in which the president is elected by 3/5 of the votes in the parliament, and no longer directly by the people.

Later in 2000, when Parliament failed three times to elect a new president, Petru Lucinschi exercised his right to dissolve Parliament, calling for new parliamentary elections. However, since no single candidate was able to garner a majority of votes, Lucinschi temporarily remained president.

Disagreements that appeared within the Alliance for Democracy and Reforms, caused to some degree by displeasure with seat distributions, led to its disintegration and an overwhelming Party of Communists victory in 2001 parliamentary election.

In the next decade, the Party of Communists used very successfully the incoherent activity of the Alliance for Democracy and Reforms for the discreditation of any form of political coalition formed without Communists. Their criticisms of the Alliance For European Integration is a good example.

== Communists governance 2001–2009 ==
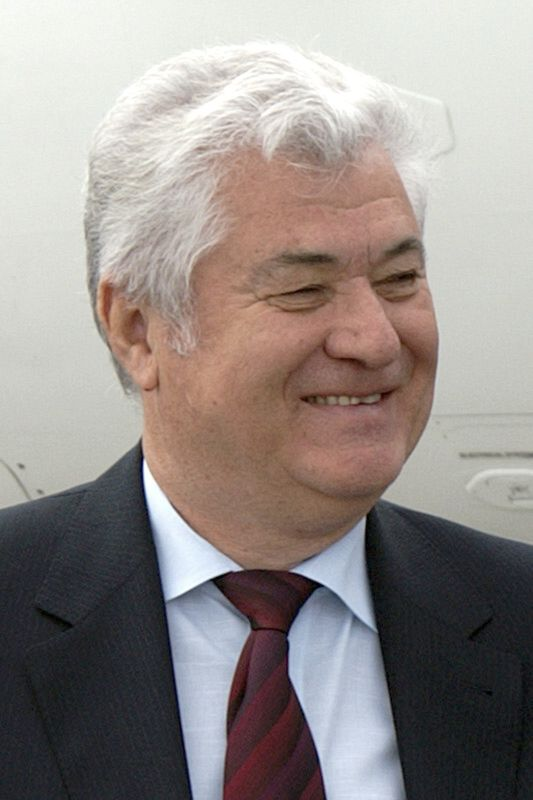
Vladimir Voronin, third President of Moldova (2001–2009)

Widespread popular dissatisfaction with the government, the economy, and the reforms, however, led to a surprise at the polls in February 2001. In elections certified by international observers as free and fair, Moldova's populace voted overwhelmingly for the communists. The communist faction, which had previously occupied 40 of the Parliament's 101 seats since they were legally allowed to exist in 1998, jumped to 71 – a clear majority. Communist deputies were then able to elect Vladimir Voronin, the leader of their faction, as president. Voronin, previously served as an official of the Moldovan Communist Party Central Committee, as well as First Secretary of the Bender City Party Committee and Minister of Internal Affairs.

Only 3 of the 31 political parties passed the 6% threshold of the 25 February 2001 elections. Winning 49.9% of the vote, the Party of Communists gained 71 of the 101 MPs, and on 4 April 2001, elected Vladimir Voronin as the country's third president. A new government was formed on 19 April 2001 by Vasile Tarlev. The country became the first post-Soviet state where a non-reformed Communist Party comes back to power.

Since his election, President Voronin has proceeded with Lucinschi's plans to privatize several important state-owned industries, and even has on occasion broken with his own party over important issues. He also repeatedly announced plans to introduce measures to promote land consolidation in the countryside, a move outside observers have dubbed "recollectivization." However, under President Voronin, relations with Romania have, at times, worsened. Tensions arose when the President tried to introduce Russian as a second national language as well as insist that the Moldovan state language be called Moldovan. The Romanian language in Moldova has come to be called "Moldovan", prompting a long controversy whether the language is identical or closely resembles Romanian. In 2007 the Moldovan government did not allow Romania to open two consulates in major cities of Moldova, Bălţi and Cahul, that were intended to simplify the acquisition of Romanian visas for the Moldovan population..

In March–April 2002, in Chişinău, several mass protests took place against the plans of the government to fulfil its electoral promise and introduce Russian as the second state language along with its compulsory study in schools. The government mainly renounced these plans, but Russian was eventually re-introduced as a compulsory subject in Moldovan schools, albeit only 1 to 2 hours per week.

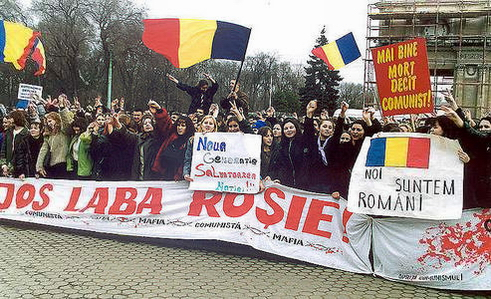
Demonstrations in Chişinău in 2003

An attempt at re-introduction of Russian into Moldovan schools caused protests in the center of Chisinău, led by the nationalist Christian-Democratic People's Party, and was aborted as the movement lost momentum. The Communist party has also attracted much criticism over the increasingly authoritarian rule in Chişinău.

Relationship between Moldova and Russia deteriorated in November 2003 over a Russian proposal for the solution of the Transnistrian conflict, which Moldovan authorities refused to accept due to political pressure from the West, since it stipulated a 20-year Russian military presence in Moldova. The federalization of Moldova would have also turned Transnistria and Gagauzia into a blocking minority over all major policy matters of Moldova.

In the wake of the November 2003 deadlock with Russia, a series of shifts in the external policy of Moldova occurred, targeted at rapprochement with the European Union. In the context of the EU's expansion to the east, Moldova wants to sign a Stabilization and Association Agreement, and demands an Individual Action Plan to accede to the EU. A national commission for European integration was created in June 2003, and in November 2003 all three political parties present in the parliament adopted a common declaration stating a pro-European orientation of Moldova. Since 1999, Moldova has affirmed its desire to join the European Union, and implement its first three-year Action Plan within the framework of the European Neighborhood Policy (ENP) of the EU. Analysts claim that, in fact, Moldova did not manage to fully implement the Action Plan and instead of positive ideas it was constantly sending to Brussels contradictory signals about its commitment to implement reforms.

On 19 December 2003, the Parliament passed a Law of Nationalities, which made a controversial distinction between a Moldovan majority and a Romanian minority (a historically, ethnically, and linguistically contentious distinction). In the 2004 population census, first since independence, of the 2,638,125 Moldovans and Romanians (78.3% of the country's population), 2,564,850 (97.2%) were registered as Moldovans and 73,276 (2.8%) as Romanians (94.9%, resp. 5.1% in urban areas, and 98.4%, resp. 1.6% in rural areas). 2,012,542 or 76.3% of them called native language Moldovan (58.9% in urban areas and 84.8% in rural ones), and 552,920 or 21.0% of them called it Romanian (34.3% in urban areas and 14.4% in rural ones).

In the summer of 2004, Transnistrian authorities forcibly closed four Romanian-language schools in Tiraspol, Bender, and Rîbnița that used the Romanian language in the Latin alphabet. This caused an increase in tensions between the Moldova and the breakaway province, which resulted in Moldova and Transnistria imposing economic sanctions on each other. The conflict was resolved later that year with Transnistrian authorities granting the establishments the status of privately funded schools.

In the following election of 2005, the Party of the Communists was re-elected on a pro-Western platform, stressing the need for European integration. Later that year the Moldovan Parliament re-elected Voronin to a second term as president. Moldovan authorities denied entry to a Russian organization (CIS-EMO), that Russia said was to monitor the elections for fairness; some members of the organization who nevertheless entered the country were deported. As a consequence, Russian-Moldovan ties weakened greatly, and the nation was split between building relations with the West or with Russia.

In the 6 March 2005 elections, the Communist Party won 46% of the vote, (56 of the 101 seats in the Parliament), Democratic Moldova Block won 28.5% of the vote (34 MPs), and the Christian Democratic People Party (CDPP) won 9.1% (11 MPs). On 4 April 2005, Vladimir Voronin was re-elected as country's president, supported by a part of the opposition, and on 8 April Vasile Tarlev was again charged as head of government. Several major shifts produced in the political scene of Moldova since 2005. At first most of the opposition supported Vladimir Voronin, who was regarded as changed from being pro-Russian to being pro-Western, but this was changed largely after Voronin launched a sustained verbal campaign (in press, in official declarations, and at European fora) against Romanians and Romania, whom he blames for stealing Moldova's citizens (ca. 100,000 Moldovans have also Romanian citizenship, and other 800,000 are waiting in line).

The government was formed by the Party of the Communists, supported parliamentary by CDPP (deserted by many members because of that) and mostly (not always) by the Democratic Party of Moldova. The major opposition parties include Party Alliance Our Moldova, Liberal Party, whose candidate Dorin Chirtoacă won on 17 June 2007 the elections for the mayor of the capital Chişinău, and Liberal Democratic Party of Moldova.

As of 2006, approximately 1,200 of the 14th army personnel remained stationed in Transnistria. In the last years, negotiations between the Transnistrian and Moldovan leaders have been going on under the mediation of the OSCE, Russia, and Ukraine; lately observers from the European Union and the United States have become involved as observers, creating a 5+2 format.

In the March 2005 elections, the Party of the Communists (PCRM) won 46% of the vote, (56 of the 101 seats in the Parliament), Democratic Moldova Block (BMD) won 28.5% of the vote (34 MPs), and the Christian Democratic People Party (PPCD) won 9.1% (11 MPs). On 4 April 2005, Vladimir Voronin was re-elected as country's president, supported by a part of the opposition, and on 8 April, Vasile Tarlev was again charged as head of government. On 31 March 2008, Vasile Tarlev was replaced by Zinaida Greceanîi as head of the government.

Since Romania joined the European Union in 2007 and imposed a visa requirement for Moldovan citizens, as many as 800,000 Moldovan citizens have applied for Romanian citizenship (anyone with at least one grandparent who was a Romanian citizen in 1940 can apply for Romanian citizenship).

On 18 November 2008, NATO Parliamentary Assembly adopted Resolution 371 on the future of NATO-Russia relations, with among other things, "urges the government and the parliament of Russia to respect its commitments which were taken at the Istanbul OSCE Summit in 1999 and has to withdraw its illegal military presence from the Transdnestrian region of Moldova in the nearest future."

== Pro-European coalitions in power 2009 to date ==
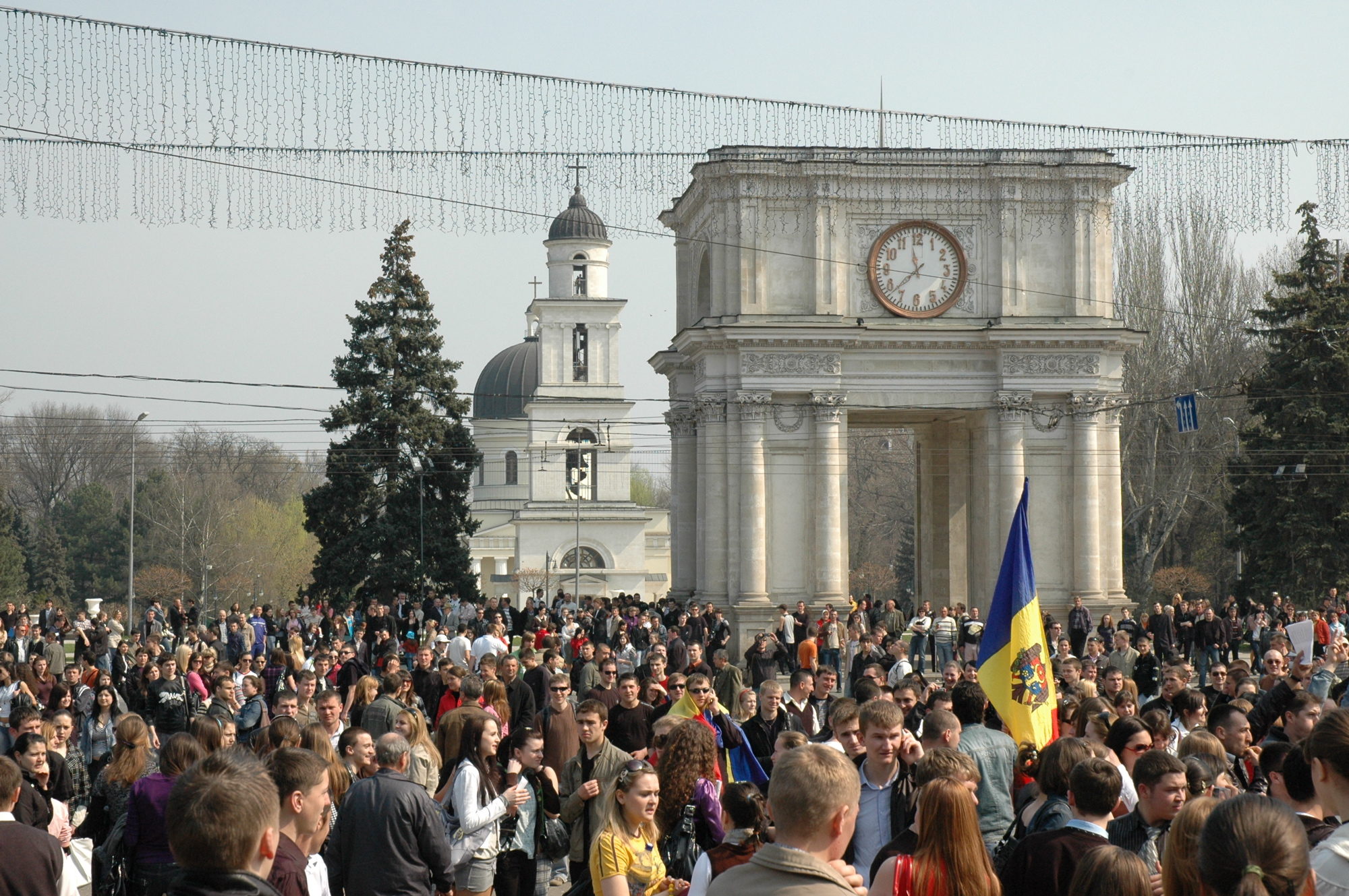
Protests in Chişinău after the April 2009 elections

A parliamentary election was held in Moldova on 5 April 2009. The Party of Communists of the Republic of Moldova (PCRM) won a majority of seats (60 out of 101) for the third consecutive occasion. Turnout was 59.49 percent, exceeding the 50% necessary for the election to be valid. The new parliament had to elect a new President of Moldova as the incumbent Vladimir Voronin had to stand down after completing two terms.

The EU had called on Moldova to reform its electoral law, which foresees an electoral threshold of 6% and makes little allowance for alliances of smaller parties, so that smaller parties might also enter parliament, but President Vladimir Voronin had rejected such calls. Final results were announced on 8 April 2009; the ruling PCRM failed to gain the 61 seats required to elect the president, leaving the opposition parties with the possibility of forcing a new election. The ballot recount performed on 21 April confirmed these results.

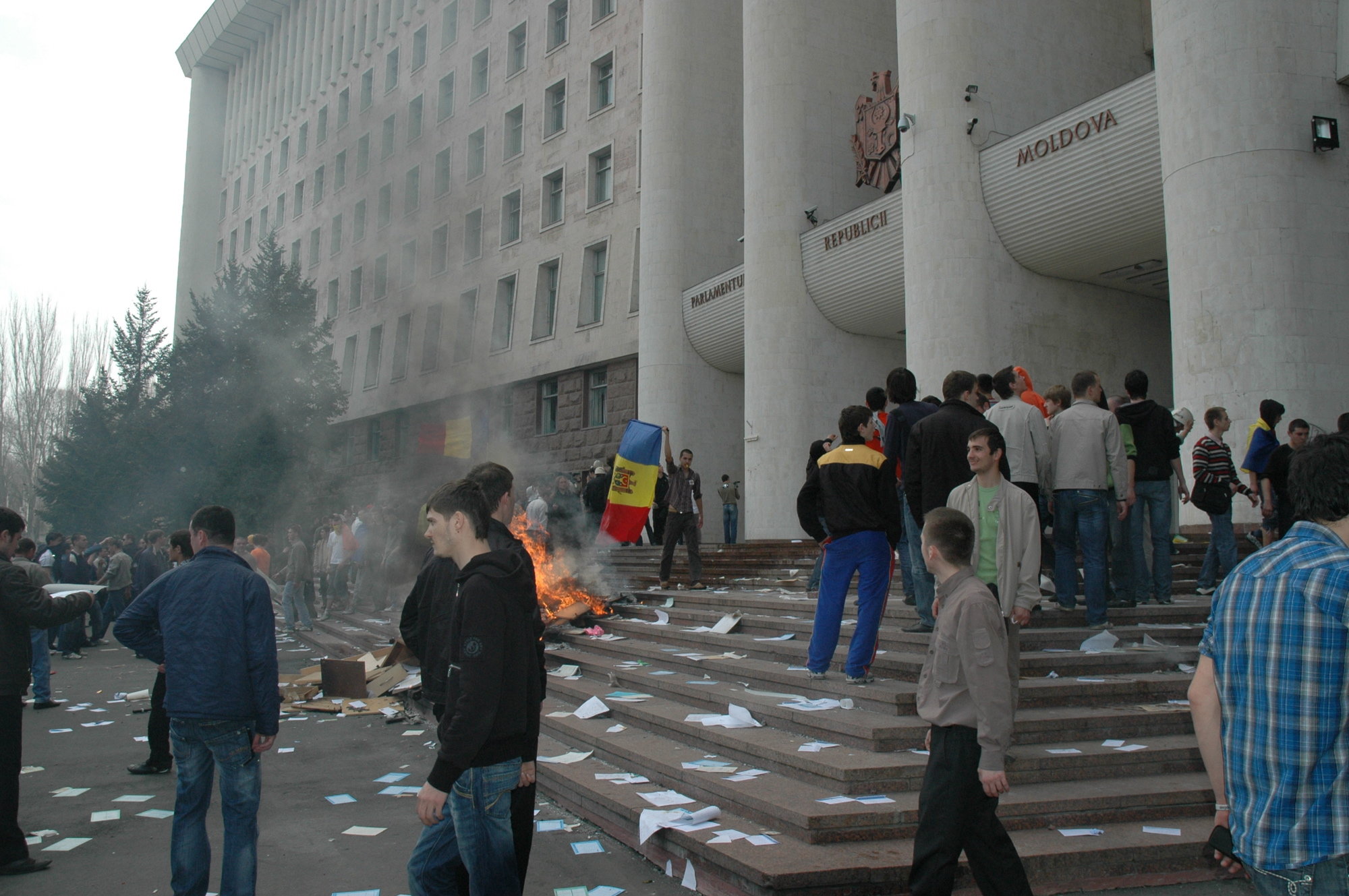
Protest riots in front of the Parliament of Moldova, 7 April 2009

A wave of protests began on 7 April 2009 in major cities of Moldova (including the capital Chişinău and Bălţi) after the results of the election were announced. The demonstrators claimed that the elections, in which the governing PCRM was early reported to win a majority of seats, were fraudulent, and alternatively demanded a recount, a new election, or resignation of the government. Similar demonstrations took place in other major Moldovan cities, including the country's second largest, Bălți, where over 7,000 people protested. The protesters organized themselves using an online social network service, Twitter, hence its moniker used by the media, the Twitter Revolution or Grape revolution. In Chişinău, where the number of protesters rose above 15,000, the demonstration escalated into a riot on 7 April. Rioters attacked the parliament building and presidential office, breaking windows, setting furniture on fire and stealing property.

The protest resulted in four deaths, 270 injured and several people jailed, among allegations of use of torture by the police, and a diplomatic row with Romania, after President Voronin accused Romania of being the force behind the riots in Chişinău. After the civil unrest, the climate in Moldova became very polarized. The parliament failed to elect a new president. For this reason, the parliament was dissolved and snap elections were held. The 29 July polls were won by the Communist Party with 44.7% of the vote. That gave the former ruling party 48 MPs, and the remaining 53 seats in the 101-member chamber went to four opposition parties. Opposition parties agreed to create the Alliance for European Integration that pushed the Communist Party into opposition. The Communists were in government since 2001.

In the July 2009 Moldovan parliamentary election, the Party of Communists, gained around 45% of the vote, whilst the other four parties which won seats each gained from around 7% to 16%. However, combined, the opposition parties to the Communists secured a greater percentage of the vote, and are now in discussion over forming a coalition. This has led some commentators to declare the election a loss for the Communists.

In August 2009, four Moldovan parties – Liberal Democratic Party, Liberal Party, Democratic Party, and Our Moldova Alliance – agreed to create a governing coalition that will push the Communist Party into opposition. The name of the coalition was Alliance for European Integration.

A subsequent attempt by the ruling coalition to amend the constitution of Moldova via a referendum in 2010 in order to enable presidential election by popular vote has failed to meet the 33% turnout required. The Constitutional Court of Moldova therefore ruled that acting president of Moldova, Mihai Ghimpu had to dissolve the parliament and hold new elections.

A parliamentary election was held in Moldova on 28 November 2010 after indirect presidential elections failed for the second time in late 2009. The Communists won 42 seats, while the Liberal-Democrats won 32, the Democratic Party won 15, and the Liberals won 12. This gave the Alliance for European Integration 59 seats, 2 short of the 61 needed to elect a president. The result thus maintained the status quo following the contemporaneous constitutional deadlock. Observers from the OSCE and the Council of Europe lauded the election. In December, the prime minister Vlad Filat of the Liberal Democrats was able to secure a parliamentary majority, with the support of the Liberals and of the Democratic Party, whose leader Marian Lupu was appointed temporary speaker of the Parliament, and thus also acting head of state.

On 16 March 2012, parliament elected Nicolae Timofti as president by 62 votes out of 101, with the PCRM boycotting the election, putting an end to a political crisis that had lasted since April 2009. On 30 May 2013 the Alliance for European Integration was succeeded by the Pro-European Coalition with Iurie Leancă becoming prime minister. In the November 2014 elections the pro-European parties maintained their majority in parliament.

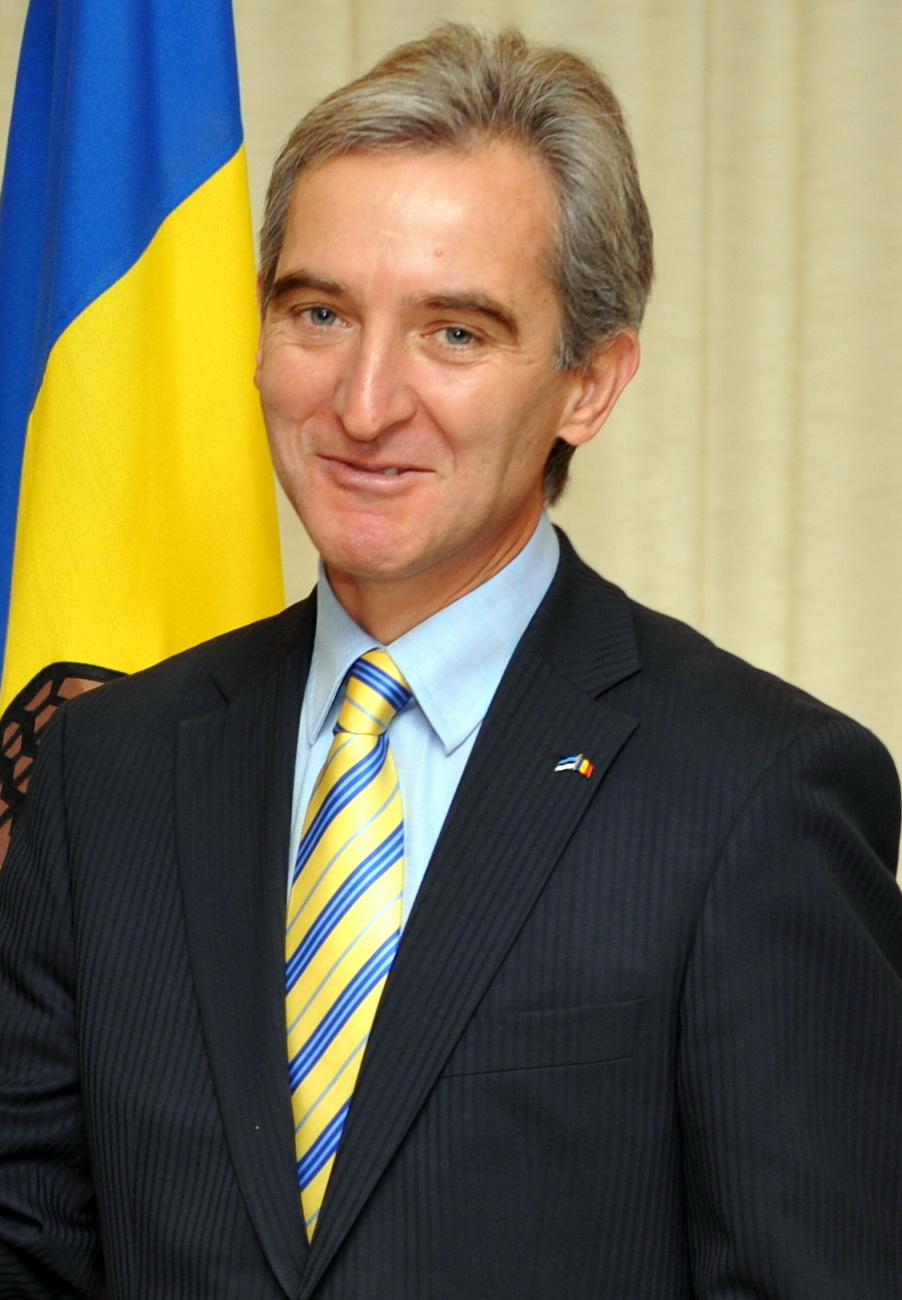
Iurie Leancă (PLDM), 2013 Prime Minister

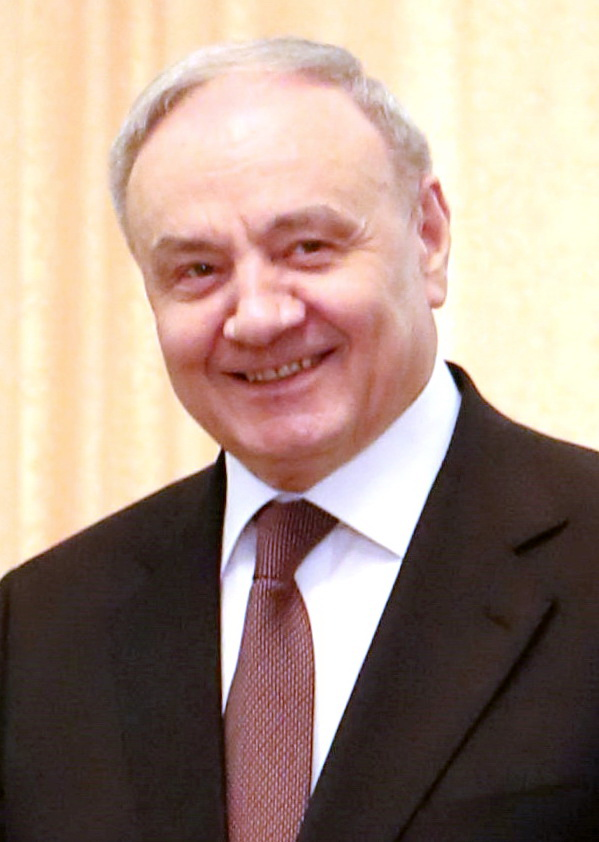
Nicolae Timofti, (Independent),
2012 President

== See also ==
- Politics of Moldova
- Dissolution of the Soviet Union
- Disputed status of Transnistria
- Transnistrian Declaration of Independence
