= Popular Democratic Party of Moldova =

Political party in Moldova

The Popular Democratic Party of Moldova (Romanian: Partidul Democrat Popular din Moldova, PDPM) was a political party in Moldova led by Serghei Scripnic.

== History ==
Registered on 25 March 1997, the party joined the For a Democratic and Prosperous Moldova alliance to contest the 1998 elections. The alliance received 18% of the vote, winning 24 of the 101 seats and becoming the third-largest faction in Parliament. It formed the Alliance for Democracy and Reforms coalition together with Democratic Convention of Moldova and the Party of Democratic Forces, which was able to form a government led by Ion Ciubuc.

The party won 25 seats in the 1999 local elections (0.41% of the total). The alliance was dissolved prior to the 2001 elections, which the PDPM did not contest.

It joined the Our Moldova Alliance for the May 2003 local elections, before merging into it in July 2003.
