= Liberalism in Moldova =

This article gives an overview of liberalism in the Republic of Moldova. In the years from 1918 through 1940 and 1941 through 1944, what is today the Republic of Moldova was part of Romania, so the Romanian political parties were active in Moldova. It is limited to liberal parties with substantial support, principally those with a history of representation in parliament.

== History ==
After independence from the former Soviet Union numerous liberal parties were founded.

=== Towards the Liberal Democratic Party of Moldova ===
- 1993: The National Liberal Party (PNL) is established.
- 1995: The Party of Rebirth and Conciliation of Moldova (PRCM) is established.
- 1997: The Social Democratic Alliance of Moldova (ASDM) is established.
- 1997: The Popular Democratic Party of Moldova (PDPM) is established.
- 2000: The PNL merged with the Social-Political Movement "For Order and Justice" (POD) to create the Social Liberal Union Force of Moldova (USLFM).
- 2001: The Independents' Alliance of Moldova (AIRM) is established.
- 2002: The USLFM merged with the PRCM and the Christian Democratic National Peasants' Party of Moldova (PNŢCDM) to create the Liberal Party (2002) (Partidul Liberal).
- 2003: The Liberal Party (2002) merged with the ASDM, the AIRM and the PDPM to create the Party Alliance Our Moldova (PAMN).
- 2006: The National Liberal Party is re-founded.
- 2011: The PAMN is absorbed by the Liberal Democratic Party of Moldova.

=== Towards the Democratic Party of Moldova ===
- 1993: The Party of Democratic Forces (PFD) is established.
- 2001: The Social Liberal Party (PSL) is founded, incorporating the Social-Liberal Initiative Group, the Christian Democratic League of Women (LCDF) and the National Youth League of Moldova (LNTM).
- 2002: The PFD merged into the party.
- 2008: The PSL is absorbed by the Democratic Party of Moldova.

=== Towards the Liberal Party (2005) ===
- 1993: The Party of Reform (PR) is established.
- 2005: The PR adopts the name Liberal Party (PL).
- 2013: The Liberal Reformist Party (PLR) splits from the PL.
- 2016: Party of Action and Solidarity

== See also ==
- History of Moldova
- Politics of Moldova
- List of political parties in Moldova
- Liberalism and radicalism in Romania
- Timeline of liberal parties in Romania
