= Alliance of Free Peasants =

The Alliance of Free Peasants (Romanian: Alianţa Țăranilor Liberi, AȚL) was a political party in Moldova.

== History ==
The party joined the Bloc of Peasants and Intellectuals, which was formed to contest the February 1994 elections, alongside the Congress of the Intellectuals (CI), the Democratic Christian League of the Women of Moldova (LDCFM), the Christian Democratic Party of Moldova (PDCM) and the National Liberal Party (PNL). The bloc received 9% of the vote, winning 11 of the 104 seats and becoming the third-largest faction in Parliament.

Prior to the 1998 elections the Bloc was disbanded as the Party of Democratic Forces (a merger of the CI and the PDCM) contested the elections alone, whilst the LDCFM joined the Democratic Convention of Moldova and the PNL joined the Alliance of Democratic Forces. At this point, the AȚL ceased to exist.
