= Christian-Democratic People's Party (Moldova) =

Christian-Democratic People's Party Partidul Popular Creștin Democrat
- President: Victor Ciobanu
- Founded: 20 May 1989
- Headquarters: Chișinău
- Ideology: Christian democracy Russophilia; Euroscepticism; Right-wing populism Economic nationalism Eurasianism; Historical: Moldovan-Romanian unionism Romanian nationalism Pro-Europeanism; Atlanticism
- Political position: Right-wing to far-right
- European affiliation: European People's Party (observer)
- International affiliation: Centrist Democrat International
- Colours: Olive, Red
- Parliament: 0 / 101

Website
- ppcd.md

The Christian-Democratic People's Party (Romanian: Partidul Popular Creștin Democrat, PPCD) is a Christian-democratic political party in Moldova. The party was led by Iurie Roșca from 1994 until 2011. Until 2005, the PPCD and the (Moldovan) National Liberal Party were the main political organizations in the country supporting the unification of Moldova and Romania. After the PPCD began supporting the anti-unification Communist President Vladimir Voronin, the party has lost its unionist credentials while other parties such as the Liberal Party have taken over the pro-Romanian ideological space. The party has had very poor results in all subsequent elections. Since April 2005, the PPCD has lost several deputies, mayors, councillors and members to the liberal-democratic parties. The PPCD was an informal coalition partner of the Party of Communists of the Republic of Moldova from 2005–2009.

== History ==
It is the successor of the Democratic Movement of Moldova (1988–1989), Popular Front of Moldova (1989–1992), and the Christian Democratic Popular Front (1992–1999). In March 2005, the party became an observer member of the European People's Party.

The 2002 one-month suspension of party's activities was found to be in violation of its freedoms of assembly and association by the European Court of Human Rights in 2006.

== Election results ==
=== Parliament ===
Election year	# of total votes	% of overall vote	# of seats	+/–
1994	133,606 (Note: Alliance of the Christian Democratic Popular Front list won 9 seats.)	7.53	8 / 101	
1998	315,206 (Note: Democratic Convention of Moldova list won 26 seats – 8 went to the PRCM – 6 to the LCDF – 2 to the PEMAV – 2 to the PȚCD.)	19.42	8 / 101	Steady
2001	130,810	8.24	11 / 101	▲3
2005	141,341	9.07	11 / 101	Steady
2009 (April)	46,549	3.03	0 / 101	▼11
2009 (July)	30,173	1.91	0 / 101	Steady
2010	9,046	0.53	0 / 101	Steady
2014	11,782	0.74	0 / 101	Steady
