= Christian-Democratic People's Party =

Christian-Democratic People's Party may refer to:

- Christian-Democratic People's Party (Moldova) (Partidul Popular Creştin-Democrat)
- Christian Democratic National Peasants' Party in Romania (Partidul Național Țărănesc Creștin Democrat)
