= Party of Rebirth and Conciliation of Moldova =

Political party of Moldova

The Party of Rebirth and Conciliation of Moldova (Romanian: Partidul Renașterii și Concilierii din Moldova, PRCM) was a political party in Moldova.

== History ==
The PRCM was established in 1995 by former members of the Democratic Agrarian Party of Moldova (PDAM), who had been encouraged to break away from the party by President Mircea Snegur. Snegur was the party's candidate for the 1996 presidential elections. Although he received the most votes in the first round, he was defeated by independent candidate Petru Lucinschi in the run-off.

Prior to the 1998 elections the party joined the Democratic Convention of Moldova alliance (CDM), forming the core of the alliance. The CDM finished second, winning 26 of the 101 seats. Together with the other non-Communist parties, it established the Alliance for Democracy and Reforms (ADR), which was able to form a government.

The party ran alone in the 2001 elections. Despite receiving 5.8% of the vote and finishing in fourth place, it failed to win a seat. The following year the PRCM merged with the For Order and Justice Social-Political Movement, the National Liberal Party (PNL) and the National Christian Democratic Peasants Party of Moldova to form the Liberal Party. In 2003, the Liberal Party merged into the Our Moldova Alliance (AMN).
