= Partidul Național Liberal =

Partidul Național Liberal may refer to:

- National Liberal Party (Moldova), a political party in the Republic of Moldova
- National Liberal Party (Romania), a centre-right liberal party in Romania
