= Christian Democratic Party of Moldova =

Political party

The Christian Democratic Party of Moldova (Romanian: Partidul Democrat-Creştin din Moldova, PDCM) was a political party in Moldova.

== History ==
Prior to the 1994 elections the PDCM joined the Bloc of Peasants and Intellectuals, alongside the Alliance of Free Peasants (AȚL), the Congress of Intellectuals, the Democratic Christian League of the Women of Moldova (LDCFM) and the National Liberal Party (PNL). The bloc received 9% of the vote, winning 11 of the 104 seats and becoming the third-largest faction in Parliament.

In June 1994 the PDCM and the seatless Democratic Party merged into the Congress of the Intellectuals, which was renamed United Democratic Congress, before being renamed the Party of Democratic Forces in October 1995.
