= Christian Democratic League of Women =

The Christian Democratic League of Women (Romanian: Liga Creştin Democrată a Femeielor, LCDF) was a political party in Moldova.

== History ==
The party was originally known as the Democratic Christian League of the Women of Moldova (Liga Democrat Creştin a Femeielor din Republca Moldova, LDCFM), and was led by Leonida Lari from 1990 until 1992. Prior to the 1994 elections it joined the Bloc of Peasants and Intellectuals, alongside the Alliance of Free Peasants (AȚL), the Congress of Intellectuals (CI), the Christian Democratic Party of Moldova (PDCM) and the National Liberal Party (PNL). The bloc received 9% of the vote, winning 11 of the 104 seats and becoming the third-largest faction in Parliament.

Prior to the 1998 elections the party joined the Democratic Convention of Moldova alliance, which became part of the Alliance for Democracy and Reforms governing coalition. In February 1999 the party was renamed the Christian Democratic League of Women.

The February 2001 elections saw the party run candidates on the National Liberal Party list. However, in March 2001 it merged with the National Youth League of Moldova to form the Social Liberal Party.
