= Christian Democratic Peasants' Party of Moldova =

Political party in Moldova

The Christian Democratic Peasants' Party of Moldova (Romanian: Partidul Țărănesc Creștin Democrat din Moldova, PȚCD) was a political party in Moldova.

== History ==
Prior to the 1998 elections the party joined the Democratic Convention of Moldova alliance (CDM). The CDM finished second, winning 26 of the 101 seats. Together with the other non-Communist parties, it established the Alliance for Democracy and Reforms, which was able to form a government.

The party ran alone in the 2001 elections. However, it received just 0.3% of the vote and failed to win a seat.
