= Christian Democratic People's Party =

Christian Democrat People's Party may refer to:

- Christian Democratic People's Party of Switzerland
- Christian Democratic People's Party (Hungary)
- Christian-Democratic People's Party (Moldova)
- Christian-Democratic People's Party (Romania)
