= Bloc of Peasants and Intellectuals =

Electoral alliance in Moldova (1994–1998)

The Bloc of Peasants and Intellectuals (Romanian: Blocul Țăranilor și Intelectualilor, BȚI) was a political alliance in Moldova led by Simion Certan.

== History ==
The bloc was formed to contest the February 1994 elections, and consisted of the Alliance of Free Peasants (AȚL), the Congress of the Intellectuals (CI), the Democratic Christian League of the Women of Moldova (LDCFM), the Christian Democratic Party of Moldova (PDCM) and the National Liberal Party (PNL). It received 9% of the vote, winning 11 of the 104 seats and becoming the third-largest faction in Parliament.

In June 1994 PDCM and the seatless Democratic Party merged into the Congress of the Intellectuals, which was renamed "United Democratic Congress", before becoming the Party of Democratic Forces (PFD) in October 1995. The 1998 elections saw the PFD contest the elections alone, whilst the LDCFM joined the Democratic Convention of Moldova and the PNL joined the Alliance of Democratic Forces. ATL ceased to exist.
