= Democratic Union of Freedom =

Anti-communist organization in the Soviet Union

- Uniunea Democratică a Libertății (UDL)
- Founded at: Bălți, USSR
- Type: Conspirative Anti-Communist Organisation
- Legal status: Disbanded
- Headquarters: Bălți
- Official language: Romanian, Russian, Ukrainian
- Leader: Anatol Miliutin, Nicolai Postol
- Key people: Simion Untu, Nicolae Spinu, Boris Novac

The Democratic Union of Freedom (Romanian: Uniunea Democratică a Libertăţii) was an anti-communist conspiracy organization from Bălți. The leaders of the organization were Anatol Miliutin and Nicolai Postol.

== Activity ==
In February 1951, Anatol Miliutin made the first appeal to the population, calling in the struggle for the overthrow of Soviet power and the liquidation of the communist order. Following his first agitation activities, the organization attracted about 30 people, in equal proportions: Romanians, Ukrainians and Russians.

The main objectives of the Democratic Union of Freedom (UDL) was to liquidate the Soviet power in Bessarabia through an armed uprising and to establish a society based on democracy and private property. Among the current tasks of the organization were: the development of anti-Soviet agitation among the population, the co-optation of new members, dissemination of anti-Soviet leaflets, establishing contact with other anti-soviet forces to obtain weapons and ammunition.

Anatol Miliutin declared that the peoples of Russia have suffered and will suffer as long as Stalinism lives, and the only way out would be a liberation through revolution. In his opinion, only with the help of weapons, the aspirations of this revolution could be translated into life, namely:

- Liquidation of collective farms and distribution of land and means of production.
- Freedom of speech, press, assembly, confession and belief.
- Liberation of thought, creation, science and art.
- Inviolability of the person.
- Equitable remuneration for work.
- Freedom of private initiative.
- Inviolability of all forms of private property.

Anatol Miliutin called on all members of the Democratic Union of Freedom to group themselves in detachments, to attack the military units of the Communists, to disarm them and arm themselves, to release prisoners and to attract party members on their side, because "there are honest people too among them".

In the process of co-opting the new members, several groups of the UDL were formed. Two groups were active in the villages of Ivanovca and Gura Căinarului in the Floreşti district. One group was formed at the Locomotive Station and two at the sugar factory in Bălţi.

Anatol Miliutin and Nicolai Postol formed a committee to exercise the role of a true leadership center of the organization. This committee included former soldier in the Romanian Army Simion Untu, teacher Nicolae Spinu from the village of Gura Căinarului and sugar factory worker Boris Novac. All three candidates knew Romanian and Russian well, they were educated people and for this reason they were considered trustworthy for the development of anti-Soviet activity in the native Romanian population.

The Democratic Union of Freedom has been active for less than a year, before the first arrest of a member of the organization took place on 15 October 1951. After decades, one of the leaders of the organization, Simion Untu, would testify that the organization's dismemberment occurred as a result of an "information leak" from the members infiltrated into the organization by the Romanian secret services, the Securitate.

The texts of the first two manifestos of the Democratic Union of Freedom were lost. It is known only they ended with the slogan: "Death to communism!". The text of the third manifesto, developed by Anatol Miliutin on 15 October 1951, shortly before his arrest, reads as such: "To the shepherds and soldiers, workers, peasants and intellectuals! What did Stalin give you in the 34 years of government? Slavery, prisons, kolkhozes, a half-hungry life. Where is your land and your freedom, for which you shed so many tears and blood? Where is your equality, rights and material well-being? Stalin took everything from you, even your soul and your thoughts. He wants to build communism in your bones. Where are those freedoms proclaimed so towering by the great Stalinist constitution? They are nowhere to be found, they only exist on paper."

== Arrests of the organization members ==
- Anatol Miliutin – b. 1925, Kamashev (Rostov, RSFSR, USSR), Russian, purchaser of the agricultural artillery "Lenin" in Balti; sentenced to death by shooting.
- Nicolai Postol – b. 1925, Bocikari (Novosibirsk, RSFSR, USSR), Russian, adjuster at the depot of Balti-Slobozia Station; sentenced to death by shooting.
- Simion Untu – b. 1922, Gura Căinarului village (Soroca, Romania), Romanian, former soldier in the Romanian Army, mill worker from his native village, sentenced to 25 years of detention in labor camps, with the suspension of civil rights within 5 years and confiscation of property.
- Boris Novac – b. 1925, Bădiceni village (Soroca, Romania), Romanian, worker at the Sugar Factory in Bălți, sentenced to 25 years of detention in labor camps, with the suspension of civil rights for 5 years and confiscation wealth.
- Vasile Barbovschi – b. 1925, Bădiceni village (Soroca, Romania), Romanian, warehouse manager at the Sugar Factory in Bălți, sentenced to 25 years of detention in labor camps, with the suspension of civil rights for 5 years and confiscation of property.
- Vasile Hriplivâi – b. 1923, Căinarii Vechi village (Soroca, Romania), Ukrainian, porter at the Sugar Factory in Bălți, sentenced to 25 years of detention in labor camps, with the suspension of civil rights for 5 years and confiscation of property.
- Piotr Kapusta – b. 1912, Ivanovca village (Soroca, Russian Empire), Ukrainian, kolkhoz, sentenced to 25 years of detention in labor camps, with the suspension of civil rights for 5 years and confiscation of property.
- Alexei Coval – b. 1910, Rașcov village (Podolia, Russian Empire), Ukrainian, mill worker in his hometown, sentenced to 25 years of detention in labor camps, with the suspension of civil rights for 5 years and confiscation wealth.
- Sava Lopatinski – b. 1896, Șebutînți village, (Podolia, Russian Empire), Russian, locksmith at the Bălți Brewery, sentenced to 25 years of detention in labor camps, with the suspension of civil rights for 5 years and confiscation of property.
- Kondrat Boris – b. 1906, Pocrovca village (Hotin, Russian Empire), Russian, worker at the Bălți Sugar Factory, sentenced to 25 years of detention in labor camps, with the suspension of civil rights for 5 years and confiscation of property.
- Maxim Hrapcenkov – b. 1915, Pocrovca village (Hotin, Russian Empire), Russian, worker at the Bălți Sugar Factory, sentenced to 25 years of detention in labor camps, with the suspension of civil rights for 5 years and confiscation of property.
- Artiom Borisov – b. 1918, Dobrogea Veche village (Bălți, Romania), Russian, worker at the Bălți Sugar Factory, sentenced to 10 years of detention in labor camps, with the suspension of civil rights for 5 years.
- Porfirii Silivestrov – b. 1911, Pocrovca village (Hotin, Russian Empire), Russian, worker at the Bălți Sugar Factory, sentenced to 25 years of detention in labor camps, with the suspension of civil rights for 5 years and confiscation of property.
- Ivan Kovaliov – b. 1911, Pocrovca village (Hotin, Russian Empire), Russian, worker at the Bălți Sugar Factory, sentenced to 10 years of detention in labor camps, with the suspension of civil rights for 5 years.
- Akim Borisov – b. 1911, Pocrovca village (Hotin, Russian Empire), Russian, worker at the Bălți Sugar Factory, sentenced to 25 years of detention in labor camps, with the suspension of civil rights for 5 years and confiscation of property.
- Ivan Eșan – b. 1921, Bălți, Russian, cart driver at the city road directorate in Bălți, sentenced to 25 years of detention in labor camps, with the suspension of civil rights for 5 years and confiscation of property.
- Alexandr Korceak – b. 1922, Medveja village (Hotin, Romania), Ukrainian, porter at Moara no. 5 from Bălți, sentenced to 25 years of detention in labor camps, with the suspension of civil rights for 5 years and confiscation of property.
- Grigori Pelevaniuc – b. 1919, s Ivanovca, (Soroca, Romania), Ukrainian, porter at Bălți-Slobozia Railway Station, sentenced to 10 years of detention in labor camps, with the suspension of civil rights for 5 years.
- Mihail Doneț – b. 1922, Codreanca village, (Hotin, Romania), Ukrainian, porter at the Bălți Sugar Factory, sentenced to 25 years of detention in labor camps, with the suspension of civil rights for a period of 5 years and confiscation of property.
- Dumitru Pădureț – b. 1920, Gura Căinarului village, (Soroca, Romania), Moldovan, kolkhoz, sentenced to 25 years of detention in labor camps, with the suspension of civil rights for 5 years and confiscation of property.
- Alexandru Gonța – b. 1919, Gura Căinarului village, (Soroca, Russian Empire), Moldavian, kolkhoz, sentenced to 25 years of detention in labor camps, with the suspension of civil rights for 5 years and confiscation of property.
- Djupo Golentunder – b. 1922, Palešnik village, (Belovara, Serbo-Croatian-Slovenian Kingdom), Croatian, worker at the Bălți Sugar Factory, sentenced to 25 years of detention in labor camps, with suspension of civil rights for 5 years and confiscation of property.
- Nicolai Usatâi – b. 1912, Pocrovca village (Bălți, Russian Empire), Ukrainian, brigadier in the local kolkhoz, sentenced to 10 years of detention in labor camps, with the suspension of civil rights for 5 years.
