= Working People's Party (Moldova) =

Moldovan political party

Working People's Party Partidului Oamenilor Muncii
- President: Serghei Toma
- Founded: 23 April 1998
- Ideology: Social democracy
- Political position: Centre-left

The Working People's Party (Romanian: Partidului Oamenilor Muncii; POM) is a centre-left political party in Moldova.

== History ==
The founding congress of the party was held on 23 April 1998, when the party's program and bylaws were adopted. The Working People's Party took part in the 1999 local elections and 2001 parliamentary elections. Ion Țurcanu became the chairman of the party. It used to be known as the "New National Moldovan Party" (Noul Partid Național Moldovenesc; NPNM) and the "Party for the Union of Moldova" (Partidul pentru Unirea Moldovei; alternatively the "Political Party for the Union of Moldova", Partidul politic pentru Unirea Moldovei, PpUM). Currently, the president is Serghei Toma.

The Working People's Party tried to participate in the 2020 Moldovan presidential election, but it did not get the necessary number of signatures to be registered.

== See also ==
- National Moldavian Party
