= Moldovenism =

Aspect of Moldovan ethnolinguistic controversy

Electoral speech by Mihail Garbuz affirming Moldovan identity

Moldovenism is the political advocacy of a Moldovan identity, culture and language distinct from those of the Romanians. Supporters of a differentiated Moldovan identity argue that the inhabitants of the medieval Principality of Moldavia identified as Moldavians before the notion of a Romanian identity became widespread. Other supporters point to differences that have emerged between the Romanian-speaking populations on either side of the Prut, which they trace to the separate development of Bessarabia under Russian and later Soviet rule. The distinction between Moldovans and Romanians, speaking different languages and possessing separate historical and cultural traits, was also promoted as official doctrine by the Soviet Union, first in the Moldavian ASSR and later in the Moldavian SSR.

Opponents, including the Academy of Sciences of Moldova and the Romanian Academy, hold that Moldovans and Romanians form a single ethnic group, while linguists generally consider that Moldovan is a variety of Romanian. Such opponents often claim that the separate Moldovan identity was created by Soviet policy. In independent Moldova, Moldovenist positions have been taken up at various times by several political actors, including the Agrarian Party, the Party of Communists, the Party of Socialists and Our Party, and the question of Moldovan versus Romanian identity and language has remained a central point of political and cultural controversy.

== Historical development ==
=== Creation of Moldavian ASSR ===
In 1812 the Russian Empire and the Ottoman Empire signed the Treaty of Bucharest (1812), by which Russia annexed the eastern part of the medieval Principality of Moldavia. This territory became known as Bessarabia. Between 1859 and 1866, Principality of Moldavia and the neighbouring Principality of Wallachia united into a single country called Romania. According to a recount by traveller Fedor Karacsay in 1818, the Moldavians did not employ the endonym "Romanian" like the Wallachians did; travellers Francesco della Valle (1532) and Pierre Lescalopier (1574) attested the opposite, a shared use of the name among Moldavians, Wallachians and also Transylvanians. In 1917, when the Russian Empire was disintegrating, a Moldavian Democratic Republic was formed in Bessarabia. In 1918, after the Romanian army gained control of the region, Sfatul Țării proclaimed the independence of the Moldavian Republic and, later, voted for the union with Romania. Soviet Russia contested the outcome of these events and, in May 1919, proclaimed the Bessarabian Soviet Socialist Republic as a government in exile. After the Soviet-organized Tatarbunary Uprising failed, in 1924 a Moldavian ASSR (MASSR) was created within the Ukrainian SSR, just east of the river Dniester that then marked the boundary between the Kingdom of Romania and the Soviet Union.

For the purpose of giving MASSR its own identity separate from Romania, Soviet authorities declared the variety spoken by the majority of Moldavians to be "Moldavian language". The intellectual elites of the MASSR were asked to standardise a Moldovan literary language based on the local dialects of MASSR, which are similar to Romanian.

In 1818, Hungarian traveller Fedor Karacsay reported that Moldavians considered themselves to be "Moldoweni" (Moldovans) and rejected the theory about the Roman origin of Moldavians, unlike their neighbours from Wallachia that identified themselves as "Rumuni" (Romanians). In contrast, French traveller Pierre Lescalopier had reported in 1574 that in Wallachia, Moldavia and most of Transylvania, "they call themselves true successors of the Romans". However, until the 1920s the Russians did not argue that Moldovans and their neighbors in the Danubian Principalities somehow formed nations. One observer wrote in 1846 in the journal of the Russian foreign ministry that “the inhabitants of upper Bessarabia are essentially Romanians, that is, a mixture of Slavs and Romans, and sons of the Greek Orthodox Church". In May 1917, at a congress of Bessarabian teachers, a group protested against being called "Romanians", affirming they were "Moldovans".

Representatives of the Romanian-speaking population living in Podolia, and Kherson participated in the Bessarabian national movement in 1917 and early 1918, agitating for incorporation of the territory across Dniester into the Greater Romanian Kingdom. The Romanian government never took significant interest in these demands, which would have implied large-scale military operations, and settled in the end to leave behind those areas, which became part of Soviet Ukraine after the Russian Civil War. The calls from Transnistrian émigrés continued into the 1920s asking for Romania to fund schools in the region as there were schools and cultural organizations in regions inhabited by speakers of cognate Latin languages in the Balkans. Refugees flooded across the Dniester and special funds were put aside for housing and education.

Nichita Smochină, an educator settled in Paris, founded the Associations of Transnistrian Romanians in order to assist 20,000 refugees from across the Dniester, and welcomed the creation of the Moldavian Autonomous Soviet Republic.

Pavel Chioru, the MASSR People's Commissar of Education, argued that literary Romanian borrowed too many French language words during its standardization in the 19th century. According to Chior, this made it incomprehensible to the peasants both in the MASSR and Romania, demonstrating the division between the "ruling class" and the "exploited class". Soviet linguist M. V. Sergievsky studied linguistic variation in the MASSR and identified two dialects. One, similar to the spoken variety in Bessarabia, was chosen as the standard, to pave the way for the "liberation of the Bessarabians". Gabriel Buciușcanu, a Socialist Revolutionary member of Sfatul Țării who opposed the union with Romania, wrote a new grammar compendium in 1925, but it was considered too similar to standard Romanian grammar, and was quickly pulled out of circulation.

=== Romanizators and autochthonists ===
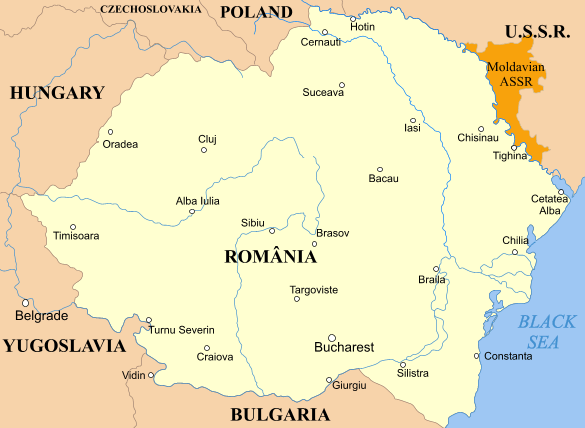
The 1920s map of Romania (includes Bessarabia). East of it, within the Soviet Union, the Moldavian ASSR (1924–1940) (within the territories of what is now Ukraine and Transnistria) was created.

In the 1920s, there was a dispute among the Soviet linguists between supporters ("Romanizators" or "Romanists") and opponents ("autochthonists", Russian: самобытники) of the convergence of the Moldavian and Romanian.

The "autochthonists" strove to base the literary Moldovan on local dialects from the left bank of the Dniester. Neologisms, mostly from Russian, were created to cover technical areas that had no native equivalent.

Then in February 1932, communists in the MASSR received a directive from the Communist Party of Ukraine to switch Moldovan writing to the Latin alphabet. This was part of the massive Latinization campaign of minority languages in the USSR, based on the theory of Soviet linguist Nikolai Marr postulating the convergence to a single world language, expected to be a means of communication in the future classless society (Communism). This directive was passively sabotaged by the "autochthonist" majority, until Stanislav Kosior (General Secretary of the Ukrainian Communist Party) and several MASSR communists visited Joseph Stalin — who reportedly insisted on faster Latinization with the ultimate goal of the convergence of Moldavian and Romanian cultures, hinting at the possibility of a future reunion of Moldova and Romania within the Soviet state. Nevertheless, resistance to Romanization among communist activists persisted, and after 1933, a number of prominent "autochthonists" were repressed, their books destroyed, and their neologisms banned.

=== Moldovans in Soviet Moldova ===
In June 1940 Bessarabia was occupied by the Soviet Union. Most of Bessarabia and about half of the MASSR were merged into a newly created Moldavian SSR, which became the fifteenth union republic of the USSR. A year later, in June 1941, Romania attacked the Soviet Union as part of Operation Barbarossa and retook Bessarabia (see Operation München). Between 1941 and 1944, Romania also occupied the territory between the Dniester and Bug rivers (historic Transnistria). By August 1944 the Soviets had taken back all the territories they lost in 1941, which remained in the Soviet Union until the latter's dissolution in 1991.

During the first years of Soviet occupation, the term "Romanian language" was forbidden. The official language for use in Moldovan schools throughout the entire MSSR (both in Bessarabia and Transnistria) during Stalinist period was based on a local variety spoken in some areas of the former MASSR. The Commission for the Study of the Communist Dictatorship in Moldova is assessing this period.

On October 11, 1942, the (Soviet) State Committee on Defense decided to extend the decrees on "the mobilization of the NKVD labour columns, German men, able to work, 17-50 years old - to the persons of other nations, being in war with USSR-Romanians, Hungarians, Italians, Finns."; the order was signed by Stalin. As a result, in May 1944, in the village of Molodiia and some other northern Bukovinian localities, those men who declared a "Moldovan" nationality were incorporated into the Soviet army, while those who declared a "Romanian" nationality were sent to the work camps in the area of Lake Onega, where most of them died. In March 1945, 3,967 ethnic Romanians from Ukraine, mostly from the Chernivtsi Oblast, were sent to the Soviet east. The Soviet era dominance of the "Moldovan" identity in parts of northern Bukovina was due to the fact that the inhabitants of the Chernivtsi and Sadagura rural raions, and of the Bukovinian part of the Novoselytsia raion, were pressured in 1944 to adopt a "Moldovan" national/ethnic identity.

In 1956, during the Nikita Khrushchev's rehabilitation of the victims of Stalinist repressions, a special report was issued about the state of the Moldavian language. The report stated, in part, that the discussions of 1920-30s between the two tendencies had been mostly non-scientific, since there were very few linguists in the republic; and that the grammar and the basic lexicon of the literary Romanian and Moldovan languages are identical, while differences are secondary and nonessential. Because the political situation in the People's Republic of Romania was now pro-Soviet, the planned convergence of the Romanian and Moldovan languages was once again approved.

During the entire period of Soviet rule, Moldovan speakers were encouraged to learn the Russian language as a prerequisite for access to higher education, social status and political power. Transfers of territory and population movements, including deportations of locals and state-encouraged immigration from the rest of the USSR, shifted the ethnic and linguistic makeup of the republic. By the late 1970s, the number of Russian speakers in the Moldavian SSR had greatly increased. These changes contributed to the proliferation of Russian loanwords in the spoken Moldovan.

While some Soviet linguists continued to deny the existence of a distinct Moldovan language, a new generation of Soviet linguists revived the debate in the 1970s. For example, one linguist, Iliașenco, compared the Romanian and Moldovan translations of a Leonid Brezhnev speech from Russian and used them as a proof for the existence of two different languages. Mikhail Bruchis analysed this claim, and noticed that all the words of both translations are found in both dictionaries. Also, Iliașenco implied that "Moldovan" preferred synthetic syntagms, while "Romanian" preferred analytic ones. However, this claim was also proven wrong, as a book of Nicolae Ceaușescu (the political leader of Romania at the time) uses mostly "Moldovan" synthetic syntagms, while a book by Ivan Bodiul (the secretary of the Moldavian SSR) uses mostly "Romanian" analytic syntagms. Bruchis' conclusion was that both translations were within the limits of the Romanian language.

== Identity politics in independent Moldova ==
The debate over the ethnicity of Moldovans has resurfaced since the collapse of the USSR. One side, whose supporters have included prominent Moldovan intellectuals such as Grigore Vieru, Eugen Doga and Constantin Tănase, argues that Moldovans have always been Romanians, even though modern history separated them from the rest of the Romanian people. In this view, Moldovenism was a Soviet attempt to create an artificial nationality in order to assimilate the Romanians living in the Soviet Union. The other side emphasizes Moldovan distinctiveness. The historian and politician Victor Stepaniuc, for example, states that Moldovans have always been different from Romanians. Others argue that for Bessarabian Moldovans, the long isolation from the rest of the Romanians, from 1812 to 1918 and again after 1940, gave them "more than ample time [...] to develop [their] own separate national identity".

Moldova's first president, Mircea Snegur, collaborated for several years with the pan-Romanian Popular Front, then the leading force in the government. During a visit to Bucharest in February 1991, he spoke of "Romanians on both sides of the Prut River". After the 1992 Transnistrian War, however, Snegur came out against union with Romania, judging that it would rule out reintegrating Transnistria. He then moved closer to the Agrarian Party, a supporter of a distinct Moldovan identity. During the parliamentary election campaign, Snegur told a congress titled "Our Home – the Republic of Moldova" that Moldovans had a historical right to their own state and to call themselves a Moldovan people. Intellectuals condemned the speech immediately. Representatives of the Writers' Union, the Institute of Linguistics, the Institute of History, Chișinău State University, and other institutions denounced it as an affront to the identity of the republic's ethnic majority and an attempt to perpetuate "an invention of the Communist regime" by erecting a "barrier to authentic Romanian culture". In spite of elite criticism, the Agrarian Party secured an absolute majority in the 1994 parliamentary elections.

=== History teaching ===
In March 1995, the Ministry of Education announced that the school subject Istoria românilor ("History of the Romanians"), introduced in 1990, would be replaced by Istoria Moldovei ("History of Moldova"). Led by students, tens of thousands marched in Chișinău, up to 60,000 on a single day, demanding that the decision be annulled and that the name "Moldovan" for the state language, which the Agrarian-majority Parliament had enshrined in the constitution the previous year, be replaced with "Romanian". The government denounced the demonstrations as an attempt to destroy Moldovan statehood. After about ten days of strikes and rallies, President Snegur issued a decree on 29 March declaring a moratorium on the planned changes pending consultations, and a government commission subsequently announced that the plan had been withdrawn. Yielding to the charged public atmosphere, Snegur addressed Parliament the following month and endorsed "Romanian" as the official language on the basis of scientific consensus, calling for Article 13 (on the state language) of the 1994 constitution to be amended. Some Agrarians demanded a referendum on the name of the language, and Snegur left the party. Protests continued into May.

In 2002, the Communist government, which took power the previous year, again tried replacing the History of the Romanians with the History of Moldova. The decision, taken in February, escalated protests that had begun in January over an order making Russian compulsory in schools. The demonstrations grew to draw estimates of 40,000 to 100,000 people and came to demand Parliament's resignation. A parliamentary committee chairman argued that a state should have a history, and the official newspaper Moldova Suverană suggested that teachers were manipulating the young protesters. Facing this unrest, the government made Russian optional and on 16 March repealed its decision on the History of Moldova, placing a moratorium on curriculum changes under intense pressure from the Parliamentary Assembly of the Council of Europe (PACE) while tasking a state commission with drafting a new teaching concept. An "integrated history" course eventually was piloted in some schools and made compulsory from 1 September 2006, replacing the History of the Romanians in the curriculum to renewed protests by the Association of Historians over its dilution of Romanian identity and revival of Soviet historiography. After the Communists lost power in 2009, the change was reversed and the History of the Romanians restored.

The designation of the course remains a subject of debate. In 2020, civic activists complained to the Equality Council that the name and content of the course discriminated against pupils who did not identify as Romanian. On 15 May 2025, the Council issued an advisory opinion concluding that the name Istoria românilor constituted direct discrimination against other ethnic groups and recommended an ethnically neutral name. The Ministry of Education refused to apply the recommendation, and President Maia Sandu said that the Council had exceeded its competence.

In contrast to these debates over history education, the language subject itself remained designated as "Romanian language and literature" in schools all throughout, having been taught under that name continuously since independence.

=== Legislative and ideological developments ===
On 19 December 2003, the Communist-dominated Parliament passed "The Concept of National Policy of the Republic of Moldova". The document proclaimed that Moldovans and Romanians are two distinct peoples sharing a common literary language, asserting that "sharing their source, having a common basic lexical foundation, the national Moldovan language and the national Romanian language each preserve their language name as an identifier of every nation: Moldovan and Romanian." Additionally, it designated Romanians as an ethnic minority within the country and declared the modern Republic of Moldova to be the rightful successor of the medieval Principality of Moldavia. The document faced criticism in Moldova as being "anti-European" and violating the constitution, which stipulates that "no ideology may be adopted as official state ideology". In July 2013, the Constitutional Court determined that the document lacked normative character, classifying it as a non-binding policy framework devoid of enforceable legal norms.

In 2009, Moldovan historian Gheorghe E. Cojocaru challenged the Moldovenist narrative in his work Cominternul și originile Moldovenismului, arguing that "Moldovenism" and its dissemination among Romance speakers east of the Prut were of Soviet origin. Commenting on the work, historian and former President of the Moldovan Parliament Alexandru Moșanu stated that the book demonstrates how the ideology emerged as a policy aimed at the "denationalization of Moldovan Romanians" across Transnistria, the former Moldavian SSR, and contemporary Republic of Moldova. In January 2010, the Romanian Ministry of Foreign Affairs hosted the book's launch in Bucharest, where Foreign Minister Teodor Baconschi remarked: "We learn from Mr. Cojocaru's book that 'Moldovenism' denies the Romanian identity roots and that its favorite method is exaggeration and mystification; slang becomes literary language, and a region on the Dniester's bank becomes a 'state' with a distinct 'Moldovan' identity." Marian Lupu, a former Communist figure then leading the Democratic Party as part of the ruling Alliance for European Integration, rebuked him, declaring that such official statements from Bucharest were "offensive to most of our population", adding that they "disturb our relations, poisoning our common activities and become a serious obstacle to a fruitful collaboration."

On 5 December 2013, the Constitutional Court of Moldova ruled that the 1991 Declaration of Independence, which explicitly designates "Romanian" as the official language, forms an integral unit with the preamble of the constitution and takes precedence over Article 13 of the 1994 Constitution, which had named the state language "Moldovan". A decade later, on 16 March 2023, the Moldovan Parliament passed legislation to enforce the Constitutional Court's jurisprudence, replacing the terms "Moldovan language", "official language", "state language", and "mother tongue" with "Romanian language" across all primary legislation, legal codes, and official state documents. The legislation also formally renamed the national holiday from Limba noastră ("Our Language") to Limba română ("Romanian Language").

== Self-identification ==
=== Surveys in Moldova ===
A 1992 survey by William Crowther found that 87% of Romanian/Moldovan speakers in the Republic of Moldova identified as "Moldovan" rather than "Romanian". A 1998 study by Pål Kolstø and Hans Olav Melberg asked self-identified Moldovans how they related the Romanian and Moldovan identities: 55% considered them somewhat different, 26% very different, and fewer than 5% identical. According to the authors, 53.5% of self-identified Moldovans saw no difference between the Romanian and Moldovan languages, in data that also covered Transnistria. Alla Skvortsova reported that 94.4% of self-identified Romanians in Moldova considered the two languages the same, against 53.2% of self-identified Moldovans.

An October 2009 IMAS-Inc poll in Chișinău asked respondents of all ethnic groups to rate the relationship between Moldovan and Romanian identity on a scale from 1 (entirely the same) to 5 (completely different). Overall, 26% said the identities were entirely the same or very similar and 47% said they were different or completely different. The results varied by group. Among respondents aged 18-29, 33% chose entirely the same or very similar and 44% chose different or completely different. Among those over 60 the figures were 18.5% and 53%. The share choosing entirely the same or very similar was also above average among native speakers of Romanian/Moldovan (30%), urban residents (30%), those with higher education (36%), and residents of the capital (42%).

A survey by sociologist Iulian Gramațki and ATEȘ Research Group, published in March 2026 and covering respondents of all ethnic backgrounds, found that respondents in Moldova were almost evenly divided on whether Romanians and Moldovans are the same people (48.3%) or two different peoples (49.4%), while 63.7% of respondents in the diaspora said they were the same people.

=== Censuses in Moldova ===
The 2004 census reported 3,383,332 people living in Moldova (excluding Transnistria), of whom 76.1% declared themselves Moldovan and 2.2% Romanian. As their mother tongue, 60.2% named Moldovan and 16.6% named Romanian. The International Census Observation Mission's expert group described the census as generally conducted in a professional manner. It noted, however, that seven of the ten observer teams had reported enumerators encouraging respondents to declare themselves Moldovan rather than Romanian in many parts of the country, and it advised caution in using the nationality and language data.

The 2014 census reported 2,998,235 people living in Moldova (excluding Transnistria), of whom 75.1% declared themselves Moldovan and 7.0% Romanian. As their mother tongue, 56.7% named Moldovan and 23.5% named Romanian.

In the 2024 census, 76.8% of the population declared Moldovan as their primary ethnicity and 8% declared Romanian. A further 5.7% gave Romanian as a second ethnicity and 1.4% gave Moldovan. As their mother tongue, 48.2% declared Moldovan (down 8.5 percentage points from 2014) and 31.8% Romanian (up 8.3 percentage points from 2014). For the language usually spoken, 45.0% declared Moldovan (down 9.6 percentage points from 2014) and 33.7% Romanian (up 9.7 percentage points from 2014). In the capital, Chișinău, Romanian was both the most frequently declared mother tongue (47.7% of residents, against 28.7% for Moldovan) and the most frequently declared language usually spoken (48.8%, against 25.9% for Moldovan).

=== Moldovans in Ukraine ===
In the Chernivtsi Oblast of Ukraine, the 1989 Soviet census recorded 53,211 ethnic Romanians who gave Romanian as their native language and 32,412 who gave Moldovan. Among 80,637 Moldovans, all but one gave Moldovan. In the 2001 Ukrainian census, 105,296 Romanians gave Romanian and 467 gave Moldovan, while 61,598 Moldovans gave Moldovan and 2,657 gave Romanian. The number of Romanians naming Romanian as their language thus rose by 97.88% between 1989 and 2001, and the number of Moldovans naming Moldovan fell by about 23.31%. Among all those declaring either ethnicity, the number naming Romanian rose from 53,212 to 107,953 (102.87%), and the number naming Moldovan fell from 113,049 to 62,065 (45.1%). The eighteen villages in the Hlyboka, the Novoselytsia and the Hertsa districts of historical Bukovina and the Hertsa area with significant Romanian-speaking populations where most residents declared a Moldovan ethnic identity in 1989 had 15,412 individuals who declared their language to be Romanian in 2001 (55.91% of the local Romanian-speakers), and 12,156 who called it Moldovan in the same year (44.09% of the local Romanian-speakers).

Kateryna Sheshtakova, a researcher at Pomeranian University in Słupsk, conducted fieldwork among self-identified Romanians and Moldovans in the Chernivtsi region. She found that some Moldovans use both names for their language and accordingly declare two ethnic affiliations. One respondent said, "I am Moldovan, but to be more precise, we should say I am Romanian". Another respondent told her: "Now, it's Romanian. There is no Moldovan now. Then, it used to be Moldovan, but written with Russian letters. And now everything is in Latin." Sheshtakova suggests that self-identified Moldovans who see differences between the two languages tend to belong to the older generation. Opinion polling in Chernivtsi Oblast, together with discussions among delegates at the Meeting of the Leaders of the Romanophone Organizations from Ukraine on 6 December 1996, likewise indicated that many self-identified Moldovans believed the Moldovan and Romanian languages to be identical.

=== Diaspora ===
The U.S. Census Bureau's 2021 estimate counted 52,107 people born in Moldova. Of these, 26,921 (51.66%) have been estimated to be of Romanian ancestry. In 2000, the Bureau recorded 7,859 people of Moldovan ancestry regardless of birthplace (7,156 as first ancestry and 703 as second). The category was dropped from later reports because it fell below the reporting threshold.

== See also ==
- Dicționar moldovenesc-românesc
- Greater Moldova
- Moldovan language
- Controversy over ethnic and linguistic identity in Moldova
- Unification of Moldova and Romania
