= Cazangic =

- Commune
- Location in Moldova
- Coordinates: 46°31′N 28°26′E
- Country: Moldova
- District: Leova District

Population (2014)
  - Total: 3,174
- Time zone: UTC+2 (EET)
  - Summer (DST): UTC+3 (EEST)

Cazangic is a commune in Leova District, Moldova. It is composed of three villages: Cazangic, Frumușica and Seliște.

== Notable people ==
- Valeriu Matei
- Iurie Matei
