= Gura Căinarului =

- Commune
- Location within Moldova
- Coordinates: 47.8627777778°N 28.1830555556°E
- Country: Moldova
- District: Florești District

Government
  - Mayor: Cojocaru Aliona

Population (2014)
  - Total: 1,734
- Time zone: UTC+2 (EET)
  - Summer (DST): UTC+3 (EEST)

Gura Căinarului is a commune in Floreşti District, Moldova.
