= National Liberal Party (Moldova) =

National Liberal Party Partidul Național Liberal
- Abbreviation: PNL
- President: Mihai Severovan (acting)
- Founded: 1993; 2000 (merged into AMN); 2006 (refounded on 16 December)
- Headquarters: 6 Calea Ieșilor Street, Chișinău
- Ideology: National liberalism Conservative liberalism Moldovan–Romanian unionism Pro-Europeanism
- Political position: Centre-right
- National affiliation: Union Political Movement (2020–2021)
- Colours: Yellow, blue
- Parliament: 0 / 101
- District Presidents: 0 / 32

Website
- pnl.md/

The National Liberal Party (Romanian: Partidul Național Liberal, PNL) is a political party in the Republic of Moldova. It was founded in 1993 but temporarily disappeared through political amalgamation in 2000 before being refounded in 2006.

== Political agenda ==
The party supports the unification of the Republic of Moldova with Romania and shares copies the identity and ideology of the traditional party in neighbouring Romania. Nonetheless, very much unlike the Romanian PNL (which is dominant on the centre-right as well as Romania's second largest political party), the Moldovan PNL might actually be considered a micro party with respect to Moldovan politics. In addition to support for political union with Romania, as an interim measure, the PNL supports EU and NATO membership for Moldova. In early 2020, the PNL became one of the founding parties of the Union Political Movement (MPU), a political bloc established purposely for the unification of Moldova and Romania.

== Electoral history ==
Election	Votes	%	Parliament	Position	Government
1994	163,513	9.21 (as BȚI)^{1}	11 / 104	3rd	Parliamentary opposition
1998	36,344	2.24 (as ADF)^{2}	0 / 101	7th	Extra-parliamentary opposition
2001	44,548	2.8	0 / 101	6th	Extra-parliamentary opposition
2005	444,377	28.5 (as EBDM)^{3}	34 / 101	2nd	Parliamentary opposition
2009 (April)	Did not participate				Extra-parliamentary election
2009 (July)	Did not participate				Extra-parliamentary election
2010	10,938	0.64	0 / 101	8th	Extra-parliamentary opposition
2014	6,859	0.43	0 / 101	13th	Extra-parliamentary opposition
2019	3,375	0.24	0 / 101	11th	Extra-parliamentary opposition

Notes:

^{1} BȚI stands for Blocul Țăranilor și Intelectualilor which was also composed of the Alliance of Free Peasants (AȚL), the Congress of the Intellectuals (CI), the Democratic Christian League of the Women of Moldova (LDCFM), and the Christian Democratic Party of Moldova (PDCM).
^{2} ADF stands for Alliance of Democratic Forces which was composed of PNŢM, PLM, and PNL.
^{3} EBDM stands for the centre-left Electoral Bloc Democratic Moldova, which was composed of Our Moldova Alliance (AMN), into which the Moldovan PNL previously merged in 2000, Democratic Party of Moldova (PDM), and Social Liberal Party (PSL). AMN won 23 seats, PDM 8, and PSL 3.

== See also ==
- Liberalism in Moldova
- Liberalism and radicalism in Romania
- National Liberal Party (Romania, 1875)
- Liberal parties by country
