= Agrarian Party of Moldova =

Agrarian Party of Moldova Partidul Agrar din Moldova
- President: Nicolae Damașcan
- Founded: 21 November 1991
- Preceded by: Communist Party of Moldavia
- Headquarters: Chişinău
- Ideology: Agrarianism; Moldovenism; Russophilia
- Political position: Centre
- Colours: Green

Website
- www.e-democracy.md

The Agrarian Party of Moldova (Romanian: Partidul Agrar din Moldova, PAM), formerly the Democratic Agrarian Party of Moldova (Partidul Democrat Agrar din Moldova, PDAM), is a Moldovan political party that was prominent from 1991 to 1998. Governing for most of this period, the party represented a large centrist multi-ethnic bloc led by former collective farm chairmen and village mayors. These reformed Communists were motivated more by patronage than ideology and committed to maintaining their positions of power in the privatised agricultural and agro-industrial sector. To its right stood the pan-Romanians of the Popular Front, and to its left, the Socialists and later the Communists.

== History ==
The Agrarian Party traces its origins to a parliamentary club numbering 60 deputies and called Viaţa Satului ("The Life of the Village"), set up in April 1990. The party was formally created in November 1991, three months after Moldova's independence from the Soviet Union; Dumitru Moţpan was its first president. At the time, the sitting Moldovan Parliament was the one elected in 1990, when non-Communist parties were still banned, and deputies freely entered and exited nascent parties in a chaotic environment. In this way, the PDAM, with its clear policy orientation, institutional power base and good organisation, quickly gained the most seats and became the effective governing party, standing at the centre of the national unity government formed in mid-1992 following the end of hostilities in the War of Transnistria. Composed largely of the former Communist agricultural and agro-industrial elite, the party championed Moldovan sovereignty, opposing attempts to join Romania and Russia; however, it supported closer ties with the latter. For a time, its most radical members rejected the Front's description of Moldovans' ethnicity and language as Romanian, maintaining the Soviet view of an ethnic distinction between Romanians and Moldovans. By 1994, this ideology, sometimes called Moldovenism, had become a central tenet of the party's platform. It was notably promoted in a speech by the party's most prominent spokesman at the time, President Mircea Snegur, marking a shift from his earlier more pro-Romanian stance. The party regarded Romania with hostility, promoting the idea of a Greater Moldova extending to the Carpathian Mountains, but did not claim the Budjak from Ukraine.

Snegur's speech undoubtedly helped propel the Agrarian Democrats to victory in the February 1994 election, the country's first since independence. The Front's weakening since 1990 had already shown the unpopularity of pan-Romanian notions, and Snegur's rhetoric was against union with Romania and in favour of independence and territorial integrity. At the election, the Front finished in last place of the parties elected and the PDAM's 43.2% of the vote translated into an absolute majority in parliament (56 of 104 seats). Further confirming the popularity of government policy, at a referendum the following month, 95.4% voted that Moldova should remain an "independent and unitary state", while at the 1995 local elections, the party scored 47% of the vote.

Following the 1994 election, the Agrarians reversed a number of Frontist reforms enacted a few years earlier. Parliament voted to drop "Deşteaptă-te, române!", used in Romania as well, as the national anthem. The Constitution of Moldova, adopted by Parliament in July 1994, describes that state language as the "Moldovan language" and makes no reference to its relationship with Romanian, as did the 1989 language laws. Language tests mandated for state employees by those laws were suspended, and the State Department of Languages, which had previously conducted "raids" on institutions to ensure employees knew the official language, virtually shut down. These measures ended language as a major political issue and made Moldova de facto bilingual. The party also supported autonomy for the Gagauz, which soon manifested itself in the creation of Gagauzia. Furthermore, it backed closer relations with Russia and the former Soviet republics, calling for participation in the CIS' economic structures but not its political or military ones (Moldova joined the CIS in 1994), and advocating permanent neutrality and the banning of foreign troops from the country (then as now stationed in Transnistria). The PDAM wished for a slow transition to capitalism, continuing market reforms but with generous subsidies and credits for agriculture.

Despite the linguistic compromises reached in 1994, the matter did resurface in March 1995, when mass student demonstrations called for the constitution to recognise the language as "Romanian" and not "Moldovan". Snegur showed his support for these demands in a speech the following month delivered in order to differentiate himself in the upcoming presidential election. Soon afterwards, Snegur and his rival, parliament chairman Petru Lucinschi, formed their own parties, the former appealing to right and centre-right ethnic Moldovans; the latter to left-wing Moldovans and Slavs. A number of PDAM deputies defected to Snegur's new party, forcing the Agrarians to rely on support from the Slavic-dominated Socialist Unity Bloc. The third major candidate was Prime Minister Andrei Sangheli, who remained a leader of the Agrarian Democrats. A victorious Lucinschi was able to push through an ambitious privatisation programme in 1997 despite much resistance from the PDAM and their Slavic allies, although at the Agrarians' insistence, agricultural subsidies ballooned and privatisation and restructuring in that sector remained slow.

The Agrarian Democrats collapsed at the March 1998 election, taking 3.6% of the vote and failing to enter parliament. Two main reasons were the cause: economic malaise and the fading of the ethnic issue allowed for a Communist resurgence, and disputes among PDAM sympathizers Snegur, Lucinschi and Sangheli caused internal division. Moreover, with Snegur's party occupying the centre-right, Lucinschi's the centre and the Communists the far left, the moderate leftists of the PDAM were outflanked, having alienated Moldovan peasants by allying with Slavs against the popular Lucinschi and opposing the transformation of collective farms into private ones. Until 2001, three alliances governed together mainly as a way to block the Communists, who won the election that year. There, the PDAM took 1.2% of the vote, failing to regain ground at the 2003 local elections.

At the party's 8th congress in July 2004, its name was changed to its current form, and despite preparations to do so, it failed to contest the 2005 election. By that time led by Anatol Popuşoi, it had some 10,000 members. At the April 2009 election, it supported the ruling Communists, with Popuşoi being included on that party's list of candidates.

== Election results ==
=== Parliamentary elections ===
| Election | Lead candidate | Votes | Vote share | Seats | Status |
|---|---|---|---|---|---|
| 1994 | Dumitru Moțpan | 766,589 | 43.18% | 56 / 104 | Government |
| 1998 | Dumitru Moțpan | 58,874 | 3.63% | 0 / 101 | Extra-parliamentary |
| 2001 | Anatolie Popușoi | 18,473 | 1.16% | 0 / 101 | Extra-parliamentary |
| 2005 | Did not participate | | | | Extra-parliamentary |
| 2009 (April) | Endorsed the Party of Communists of the Republic of Moldova | 760,551 | 49.48% | 60 / 101 | Snap election |
| 2009 (July) | Did not participate | | | | Extra-parliamentary |
| 2010 | Did not participate | | | | Extra-parliamentary |
| 2014 | Endorsed the Revival Party | 4,158 | 0.26% | 0 / 101 | Extra-parliamentary |
| 2019 | Did not participate | | | | Extra-parliamentary |
| 2021 | Did not participate | | | | Extra-parliamentary |
| 2025 | Did not participate | | | | Extra-parliamentary |
