= Valeriu Matei =

Moldovan-Romanian writer and politician

Valeriu Matei OR
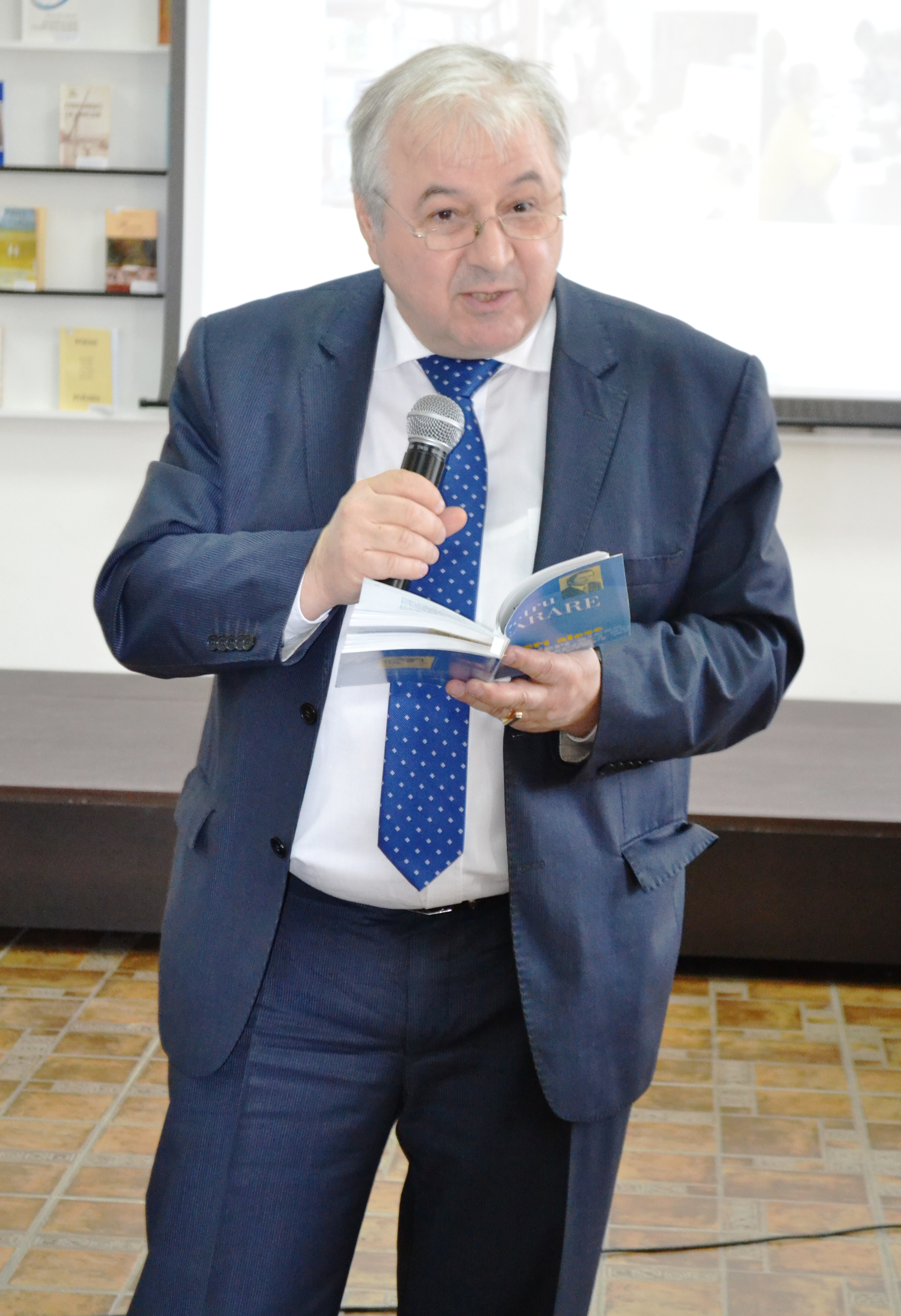
- Matei in 2015

Member of the Moldovan Parliament
- In office 17 April 1990 – 25 February 2001
- Parliamentary group: Popular Front; Bloc of Peasants and Intellectuals; Party of Democratic Forces
- Constituency: Leova

Personal details
- Born: 31 March 1959 (age 67) Cazangic, Moldavian SSR, Soviet Union
- Party: Party of Democratic Forces
- Spouse: Claudia Postică

Valeriu Matei (born 31 March 1959) is a Moldovan writer and politician. He served as a member of the Parliament of Moldova from 1990. Matei is a member of the Academy of Sciences of Moldova and an honorific member of the Romanian Academy since 2011. He ran in the 1996 Moldovan presidential election.

== Career ==
Valeriu Matei made his poetic debut in 1980 in the newspaper "The Youth of Moldova" (Chișinău). In 1981, he started publishing in the literary press of Romania. In January 1986, he published the manuscript The Pillar of Flame. In 1987, Matei was one of the participants that triggered the 1989 revolution against the Soviet occupation of the territory. He later became a member of The Writers' Union of Moldova, The Theatrical Union, and a founding member of the Democratic Movement. In May 1989 Matei helped found The Peoples' Front of Moldova as a member in the Council, in their Permanent Bureau, and as their spokesperson. He wrote the final document of the first Great National Meeting about sovereignty and the Romanians' right to have a future. The study— The work of Nicolae Milescu Spătarul – a source for the study of the historical ethnology of the peoples of Siberia and of the Far East—was published in the year 1989.

In 1990 Matei was elected member in the Parliament of Chișinău, chairman of the Parliamentary Commission for the Mass-Media, and a member in the Presidium of the Parliament. On 16 December 1990, he was the leader of the second Great National Assembly & wrote the proclamation for the independence of all Romanians from the territories occupied and annexed by the Soviets, and their right to reunite with Romania. He also wrote The Proclamation (The Final Document) adopted by this meeting and participated at the Conference OSCE (The Organization for Security and Co-operation in Europe) in Copenhagen on behalf of the Republic of Moldova. In 1991 he was the main author of the Declaration of Independence of the Republic of Moldova from the Soviet Empire. In 1993 and 1994 he was a member of the Permanent Bureau of the Intellectuals Congress, the director of the publishing house Hyperion, and editor of the weekly The Messenger.

In 1994 he released his volume, The Death of Zenon (Moartea lui Zenon). He was re-elected as a deputy in the Parliament of Moldova on behalf of the Party of Democratic Forces in 1994 before being re-elected in 1998 as the party's president 1994–1998. He became vice-president of the Parliament and chairman of the Cooperation Commission between Moldova and the European Union. In 2003 his poetry books, The morning of the great city, Orpheus and the solitude, and The imaginary Greece were published. He published Ziliada in 2008, published the new edition of the volume "Wolf Asleep" (Somn de Lup) and the anthology The Elegies of the prodigal son (Elegiile fiului risipitor) in 2010. Matei published journal articles, literature essays, and has translated from French poetry, Russian poetry, and Spanish poetry. He was also a participant of the International Istanbulensis Poetry Festival. He became a Member of the Romanian Academy in 2011.

== Honors and awards ==
The Prize for Poetry of the magazine Transilvania (1988), the prize George Bacovia of the magazine Ateneu (1991), the Grand Prize for poetry Nichita Stănescu (1995), the Mihai Eminescu Prize of the Romanian Academy and the Poetry Prize of the Mihai Eminescu International Academy (1996), the Mihai Eminescu Medal (2000) the Nichita Stănescu Grand Prize of Ploieşti for the Omnia Opera and the Nichita Stănescu Trophy (2002), awarded the National Order of the Star of Romania in the rank of Commander and is awarded the prize for literature of the Romanian diaspora in Germany (2004), the Frontiera Poesis prize at the International Poesis Festival in Satu Mare, the Opera Omnia prize at the second edition of the Cezar Ivănescu Poetry Festival (2012).
