= Party of Democratic Forces =

Political party in Moldova

The Party of Democratic Forces (Romanian: Partidul Forțelor Democratice, PFD) was a political party in Moldova.

== History ==
The party was established in January 1993 as the Congress of Intellectuals, a breakaway from the Christian Democratic Popular Front (FPCD). The FPCD called for immediate unification with Romania, whilst the CI was more moderate. It was officially registered on 18 June.

Prior to the 1994 elections, it joined the Bloc of Peasants and Intellectuals, alongside the Alliance of Free Peasants (AȚL), the Democratic Christian League of the Women of Moldova (LDCFM), the Christian Democratic Party of Moldova (PDCM), and the National Liberal Party (PNL). The bloc received 9% of the vote, winning 11 of the 104 seats and becoming the third-largest faction in Parliament.

In June 1994, PDCM and the seatless Democratic Party merged into the Congress of the Intellectuals, which was renamed United Democratic Congress. The party contested the 1995 local elections as part of the Alliance of Democratic Forces, and was renamed the Party of Democratic Forces in October that year. Valeriu Matei was nominated as the party's candidate for the 1996 presidential elections. He came fifth with 8.9% of the vote. The PFD won 11 seats in the 1998 elections, emerging as the fourth-largest bloc in Parliament. It subsequently joined the Alliance for Democracy and Reforms governing coalition.

In the 1999 local elections, the party won around 8% of council seats and mayoralties. However, the 2001 elections saw the party's vote share fall from 8.8% to 1.2%, as it lost all its MPs. Following its electoral defeat, it merged into the Social Liberal Party after a vote at its ninth congress on 1 December 2002.
