= Democratic Convention of Moldova =

Political alliance in Moldova from 1997 to 1999

The Democratic Convention of Moldova (Romanian: Convenţia Democrată din Moldova, CDM) was a political alliance in Moldova.

== History ==
The CDM was formed in 1997, in order to contest the March 1998 elections, and included the Party of Rebirth and Conciliation of Moldova, the Christian Democratic Popular Front, the Ecologist Party of Moldova "Green Alliance", the Democratic Christian League of the Women of Moldova and the Christian Democratic Peasants' Party of Moldova (PŢCD). The alliance received 19% of the vote, winning 26 of the 101 seats and becoming the second-largest faction in Parliament. It formed the Alliance for Democracy and Reforms coalition together with For a Democratic and Prosperous Moldova and the Party of Democratic Forces, which was able to form a government led by Ion Ciubuc.

Following the resignation of Ciubuc's government in 1999, the Christian Democratic Popular Front withdrew from the CDM. The 1999 local elections saw the alliance receive around 14% of the seats. They were the last elections in which the CDM participated. Prior to the 2001 parliamentary elections the alliance broke up, with the Party of Rebirth and Conciliation and Christian Democratic Peasants' Party running independently and the Democratic Christian League of the Women of Moldova (now renamed Christian Democratic League of Women) having its candidates on the National Liberal Party list.
