= Alliance for Democracy and Reforms =

Alliance for Democracy and Reforms Alianța pentru Democrație și Reforme
- Leader: Mircea Snegur, Dumitru Diacov, Valeriu Matei, Iurie Roșca
- Founded: 1998
- Dissolved: 1999
- Ideology: Liberalism; Reformism; Pro-Europeanism; Factions: Liberal conservatism Social liberalism Social democracy Christian democracy
- Political position: Centre to center-right

The Alliance for Democracy and Reforms (often abbreviated to ADR) was a governing coalition in Moldova between numerous non-Communist parties which had absolute majority in the Moldovan Parliament after the 1998 parliamentary election.

== The overall context ==
At the legislative elections on March 22, 1998, the Party of Communists of the Republic of Moldova (PCRM) gained 40 of the 101 places in the Moldovan Parliament, but was reduced to opposition when an Alliance for Democracy and Reforms was formed by the Democratic Convention of Moldova (26 MPs), For a Democratic and Prosperous Moldova (24 MPs), and the Party of Democratic Forces (11 MPs).

It is important that a former First Secretary of the Communist Party of Moldavia (PCM), Petru Lucinschi, was President of Moldova during the activity of The Alliance for Democracy and Reforms (ADR).

== Activity ==
The Alliance for Democracy and Reforms (ADR) government was formed as a result of complex negotiations between democratic parties and was the first coalition government in the history of independent Moldova. The ADR government included representatives of all political parties which were members of the coalition.

The Alliance for Democracy and Reforms had three Prime Ministers. The activity of the second government of Ion Ciubuc (May 22, 1998 – February 1, 1999), the acting government of Serafim Urechean (February 5–17, 1999), and the government of Ion Sturza (February 19–November 9, 1999) were marked by chronic political instability, which prevented a coherent reform program. Foreign policy was marked by a duality of belonging to the CIS and steps towards a rapprochement with Western Europe.

The Christian Democratic Popular Front (PPCD) voted with the Communist Party (PCRM) for the dismissal of the Alliance government on November 9, 1999. Disagreements that appeared within the Alliance for Democracy and Reforms (ADR), caused to some degree by displeasure with seat distributions, led to its disintegration and an overwhelming Party of Communists (PCRM) victory at the 2001 parliamentary election.

In the next decade, the Party of Communists (PCRM) used the incoherent activity of the Alliance for Democracy and Reforms (ADR) for discrediting any form of political coalition formed without them. Their constant criticism of the future Alliance For European Integration (AIE) is an example.
