= Social Liberal Party (Moldova) =

The Social Liberal Party (Partidul Social Liberal) was a liberal political party in Moldova, led by Oleg Serebrian. At the legislative elections, 6 March 2005, the party was part of the Electoral Bloc Democratic Moldova (Blocul Electoral Moldova Democrată), that won 28.4% of the popular vote and 34 out of 101 seats. Inside the Bloc, the party won three seats. After the elections, the Bloc fell apart in three parliamentary groups of the constituent parties.

In 2001, Oleg Serebrian released a manifest with the intention to found a social liberal party. This initiative was joined by the Christian Democratic League of Women and the National Youth League of Moldova. In 2002 the Party of Democratic Forces merged into the party. Since November 2006 the Social Liberal Party was a member of Liberal International.

It merged into the Democratic Party of Moldova in February 2008.

== See also ==
- Liberalism
- Social liberalism
- Contributions to liberal theory
- Liberalism worldwide
- List of liberal parties
- Liberal democracy
- Timeline of liberal parties in Moldova
- Alexandru Moșanu
