= Party of Law and Justice =

- President: Nicolae Alexei
- Founded: 25 July 1997
- Ideology: Christian democracy

Party of Law and Justice (Romanian: Partidul Legii și Dreptății), previously named Party of the Socio-Economic Justice of Moldova (Romanian: Partidul Dreptății Social-Economice din Moldova) is a Christian-democrat political party from Moldova, led by Nicolae Alexei. At the legislative elections on 6 March 2005, the party won 1.7% of the popular vote, but no seats.
