= Iurie Roșca =

Moldovan politician

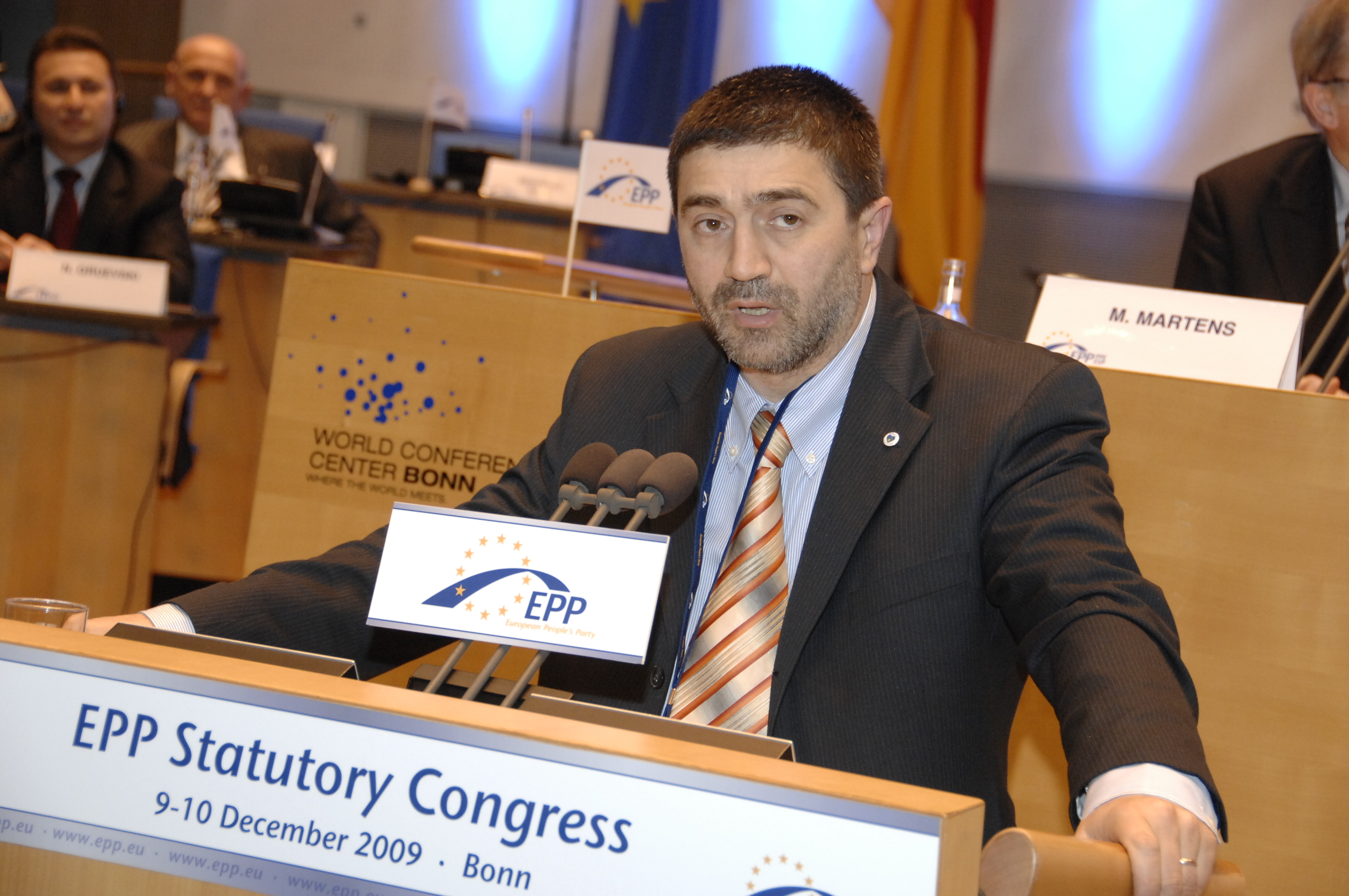
- Roșca in 2009

Deputy Prime Minister of Moldova
- In office 16 June 2009 – 25 September 2009
- President: Vladimir Voronin; Mihai Ghimpu (acting)
- Prime Minister: Zinaida Greceanîi; Vitalie Pîrlog (acting)

Vice President of the Moldovan Parliament
- In office 24 March 2005 – 22 April 2009 Serving with Maria Postoico
- President: Vladimir Voronin
- Prime Minister: Vasile Tarlev; Zinaida Greceanîi
- Speaker: Marian Lupu
- Preceded by: Mihai Camerzan
- Succeeded by: Grigore Petrenco
- In office 23 April 1998 – 25 February 2001
- President: Petru Lucinschi
- Prime Minister: Ion Ciubuc; Ion Sturza; Dumitru Braghiș
- Speaker: Dumitru Diacov
- Preceded by: Dumitru Diacov
- Succeeded by: Vladimir Ciobanu

Member of the Moldovan Parliament
- In office 3 September 1990 – 22 April 2009
- Parliamentary group: Popular Front; Christian-Democratic People's Party

Personal details
- Born: 31 October 1961 (age 64) Telenești, Moldavian SSR, Soviet Union
- Party: Christian-Democratic People's Party (1994–present)
- Other political affiliations: Popular Front of Moldova (1989–1994)
- Spouse: Larisa Roșca
- Children: Ștefan, Alexandra, and Oana
- Education: Moldova State University
- Profession: Journalist

Iurie Roșca (born 31 October 1961) is a Moldovan politician who has served as president of the Christian-Democratic People's Party (PPCD) since 1994.

== Biography ==
Iurie Roșca graduated in 1984 from the journalism faculty of Moldova State University. He then worked as a correspondent for the newspaper Tinerimea Moldovei (The Youth of Moldova), a reporter for the National Television of Moldova, and an upper-level curator at the Dimitrie Cantemir Literature Museum in Chișinău.

== Political career ==
In 1989, Roșca became one of the founders of the Popular Front of Moldova (of which the PPCD is a successor). He was executive president of the organization from 1989 to 1994. Between 1990 and 2009, he was a deputy in the Parliament of the Republic of Moldova.

In 2005, his party voted for the re-election of the Communist president Vladimir Voronin, and he became the Parliament's vice-president (a post he also held from 1998 to 2001).

In June 2009, he was sworn in as Deputy Prime Minister of the Moldovan Government However, he only held that position until September of that year.

In summer 2024 Roșca was convicted of influence peddling over the construction of a building and sentenced to six years in prison.
