= 2001 Moldovan parliamentary election =

- 25 February 2001
- All 101 seats in Parliament; 51 seats needed for a majority
- Turnout: 67.52% (▼1.60pp)
Party	Leader	Vote %	Seats	+/–
PCRM	Vladimir Voronin	50.07	71	+31
Braghiș Alliance	Dumitru Braghiș	13.36	19	New
PPCD	Iurie Roșca	8.24	11	+3
This lists parties that won seats. See the complete results below.
Prime Minister before	Prime Minister after
Dumitru Braghiș; Braghiș Alliance	Vasile Tarlev; PCRM
Cabinet before	Cabinet after
Braghiș Cabinet; CDM–PMDP–PFD	First Tarlev Cabinet; PCRM

Parliamentary elections were held in Moldova on 25 February 2001. The result was a victory for the Party of Communists of the Republic of Moldova (PCRM), which won 71 of the 101 seats.

== Electoral system ==
Parliament was elected by proportional representation in a single national constituency. In 2000 the electoral law was amended to change the electoral threshold, which had previously been at 4% for both political parties and independents. For independent candidates the threshold was lowered to 3%, whilst for political parties and electoral blocs it was raised to 6%.

== Results ==
Party	Votes	%	Seats
Party of Communists	794,808	50.07	71
Braghiș Alliance	212,071	13.36	19
Christian-Democratic People's Party	130,810	8.24	11
Party of Rebirth and Conciliation	91,894	5.79	0
Democratic Party	79,757	5.02	0
National Liberal Party	44,548	2.81	0
Social Democratic Party	39,247	2.47	0
National Christian Democratic Peasants' Party	27,575	1.74	0
Electoral Bloc Motherland	25,009	1.58	0
For Order and Justice	23,099	1.46	0
Party of Democratic Forces	19,405	1.22	0
Democratic Agrarian Party	18,473	1.16	0
Alliance of Jurists and Economists (PDCM–NPNM)	14,810	0.93	0
Faith and Justice Electoral Bloc (PR–PNR)	10,686	0.67	0
Unity Electoral Bloc (PSRM–PRM)	7,277	0.46	0
Republican Movement "Equality"	7,023	0.44	0
Christian Democratic Peasants' Party	4,288	0.27	0
Independents	36,477	2.30	0
Total	1,587,257	100.00	101
Valid votes	1,587,257	98.79	
Invalid/blank votes	19,446	1.21	
Total votes	1,606,703	100.00	
Registered voters/turnout	2,379,491	67.52	
Source: eDemocracy
