= 1999 Moldovan local elections =

Local elections were held in Moldova on 23 May 1999.

Blocul comuniştilor, agrarienilor şi socialiştilor won the elections.
