= 1998 Moldovan parliamentary election =

- 22 March 1998
- All 101 seats in Parliament; 51 seats needed for a majority
- Turnout: 69.12% (▼10.19pp)
Party	Leader	Vote %	Seats	+/–
PCRM	Vladimir Voronin	30.01	40	New
CDM	Mircea Snegur	19.42	26	+6
PMDP	Dumitru Diacov	18.16	24	New
PFD	Valeriu Matei	8.84	11	New
This lists parties that won seats. See the complete results below.
Results by district
Prime Minister before	Prime Minister after
Ion Ciubuc; ADR	Ion Ciubuc; ADR
Cabinet before	Cabinet after
First Ciubuc Cabinet; ADR	Second Ciubuc Cabinet; ADR (CDM–PMDP–PFD)

Parliamentary elections were held in Moldova on 22 March 1998. The Party of Communists of the Republic of Moldova (PCRM) emerged as the largest party in Parliament, winning 40 of the 101 seats. However, the three other parties to win seats – the Democratic Convention of Moldova (26 seats), For a Democratic and Prosperous Moldova (24), and the Party of Democratic Forces (11) – formed a coalition government which was later known as the Alliance for Democracy and Reforms, pushing the Communists in opposition until the next elections in 2001.

== Results ==
Party	Votes	%	Seats
Party of Communists of the Republic of Moldova	487,002	30.01	40
Democratic Convention of Moldova	315,206	19.42	26
For a Democratic and Prosperous Moldova	294,691	18.16	24
Party of Democratic Forces	143,428	8.84	11
Democratic Agrarian Party of Moldova	58,874	3.63	0
Civic Alliance "Ant" (ACR–UC–PFPM–PCDR–UTM)	53,338	3.29	0
Alliance of Democratic Forces (PNŢM–PLM–PNL)	36,344	2.24	0
Party of the Socio-Economic Justice of Moldova	31,663	1.95	0
Social Democratic Party of Moldova	30,169	1.86	0
Socialist Unity (PSM–MUE–UCM–PPV)	29,647	1.83	0
Social Democratic Bloc "Hope" (PSDUM–MSN–AFM)	21,282	1.31	0
Party of Socialists of the Republic of Moldova	9,514	0.59	0
Reform Party	8,844	0.54	0
Christian Democratic Union of Moldova	8,342	0.51	0
United Labour Party of Moldova	3,124	0.19	0
Independents	91,519	5.64	0
Total	1,622,987	100.00	101
Valid votes	1,622,987	96.58	
Invalid/blank votes	57,483	3.42	
Total votes	1,680,470	100.00	
Registered voters/turnout	2,431,218	69.12	
Source: eDemocracy
