= 1994 Moldovan parliamentary election =

- 27 February 1994
- All 104 seats in Parliament; 53 seats needed for a majority
- Turnout: 79.31%
Party	Leader	Vote %	Seats	+/–
PDAM	Dumitru Moțpan	43.18	56	New
PSM–MUE	Valeriu Senic	22.00	28	New
BȚI	Simion Certan	9.21	11	New
AFPCD	Iurie Roșca	7.53	9	New
This lists parties that won seats. See the complete results below.
Results by district
Prime Minister before	Prime Minister after
Andrei Sangheli; PDAM	Andrei Sangheli; PDAM
Cabinet before	Cabinet after
First Sangheli Cabinet; PDAM	Second Sangheli Cabinet; PDAM

Early parliamentary elections were held in Moldova on 27 February 1994. They were the country's first competitive elections, and followed deadlock in Parliament over the issue of joining the Commonwealth of Independent States. The result was a victory for the Democratic Agrarian Party of Moldova (PDAM), which won 56 of the 104 seats.

== Electoral system ==
In 1993 a new electoral law was passed, which removed the right to vote from serving members of the military, whilst removing the right to run for election from all members of the military, the judiciary, the police force, national security services and prosecutors. A special Central Election Commission was formed by the Supreme Court, consisting of the five judges in the Court and one representative of each party or alliance. The parliament was elected by proportional representation in a single national constituency. The electoral threshold was set at 4% for both independent candidates and political parties.

== Results ==
Party	Votes	%	Seats
Democratic Agrarian Party	766,589	43.18	56
Socialist Party–Unity Movement	390,584	22.00	28
Bloc of Peasants and Intellectuals	163,513	9.21	11
Alliance of the Christian Democratic Popular Front	133,606	7.53	9
Social Democratic Bloc (PDSM–LNTM–UTM–MDD–FITU)	65,028	3.66	0
Association of Women in Moldova	50,243	2.83	0
Democratic Labour Party of Moldova	49,210	2.77	0
Reform Party	41,980	2.36	0
Democratic Party	23,368	1.32	0
Association of the Victims of the Totalitarian Regime	16,672	0.94	0
Republican Party	16,529	0.93	0
Ecologist Party "Green Alliance"	7,025	0.40	0
National Christian Party	5,878	0.33	0
Independents	45,152	2.54	0
Total	1,775,377	100.00	104
Valid votes	1,775,377	94.99	
Invalid/blank votes	93,713	5.01	
Total votes	1,869,090	100.00	
Registered voters/turnout	2,356,614	79.31	
Source: Nohlen & Stöver
