= Doina Gherman =

Moldovan politician (born 1982)

Doina Gherman MP
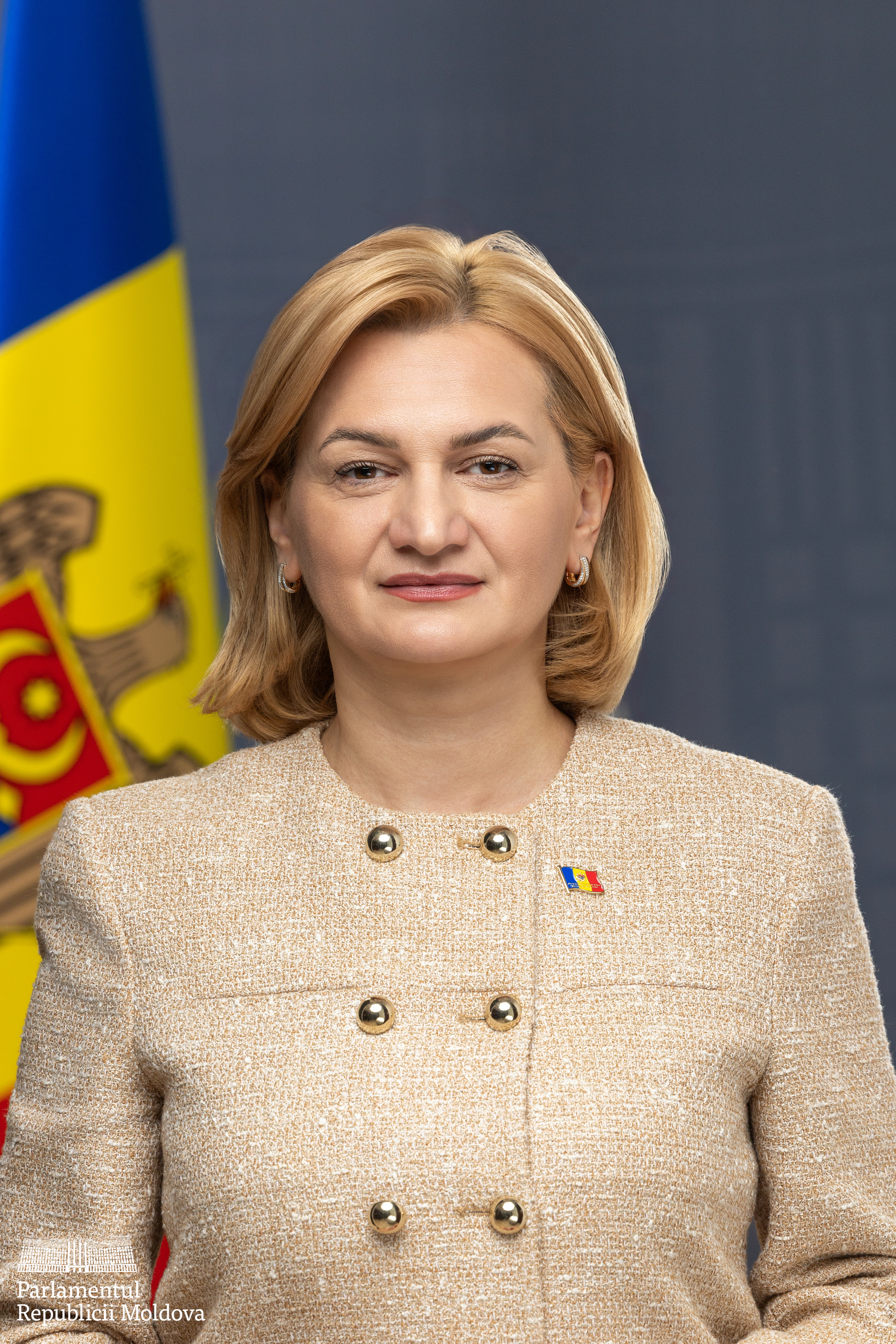
- Official portrait, 2025

Vice President of the Moldovan Parliament
- Incumbent
- Assumed office 1 February 2024 Serving with Vlad Batrîncea
- President: Maia Sandu
- Prime Minister: Dorin Recean; Alexandru Munteanu; Eugen Osmochescu (acting); Vasile Tofan
- Speaker: Igor Grosu
- Preceded by: Mihai Popșoi

Member of the Moldovan Parliament
- Incumbent
- Assumed office 9 March 2019
- Parliamentary group: Party of Action and Solidarity

Personal details
- Born: 29 November 1982 (age 43) Chișinău, Moldavian SSR, Soviet Union
- Education: Alecu Russo State University of Bălți

Doina Gherman (born 29 November 1982) is a Moldovan politician who has served in the Parliament of Moldova as a member of the Party of Action and Solidarity since 2019. She has been the Vice President of the Parliament of Moldova since 2024.

== Early life and education ==
Doina Gherman was born on 29 November 1982. She graduated with a bachelor's degree in foreign languages from Alecu Russo State University of Bălți and a master's degree in management from the Moldovan Academy of Public Administration.

== Career ==
In the Customs Service of the Republic of Moldova Gherman was an inspector from October 2010 to September 2014. At the Institute of Education Sciences Gherman taught communication and branding from January 2018 to August 2019. The International Women of Courage Award was given to her in 2022.

Gherman has been vice president of the Party of Action and Solidarity (PAS) since June 2022. In the 2019 election she was elected to the Parliament of Moldova.

Vice President of the Parliament of Moldova Mihai Popșoi was appointed as Deputy Prime Minister and she replaced him as vice president on 1 February 2024. She was the chair of the Human Rights committee from 2019 to 2021, and the Foreign Policy and European Integration committee from 2021 to 2024.

== Personal life ==
Gherman can speak Romanian, Russian, French, and English.

== Political position ==
The accession of Moldova to the European Union is supported by Gherman. She supported the ratification of the Istanbul Convention. She opposed a law against foreign agents, similar to the Russian foreign agent law, proposed by members of the opposition and noted that its proponents could be punished by their own law, with Igor Dodon on trial for corruption charges involving Russia.

== Works cited ==
=== News ===
- "Doina Gherman: Our parliamentary opposition does not have constructive approach to European integration". IPN. 19 May 2023. Archived from the original on 25 May 2023.
- "Doina Gherman to take over as Deputy Speaker of Parliament". IPN. 24 January 2024. Archived from the original on 23 June 2025.
- Rotari, Yuri (3 April 2025). "Opoziția prorusă din Republica Moldova propune o lege a agenților străini pe model rusesc". Radio Free Europe/Radio Liberty. Archived from the original on 23 June 2025.

=== Web ===
- "Deputaţi". Parliament of Moldova.
- "Doina Gherman". Women Political Leaders. 28 May 2023. Archived from the original on 23 June 2025.
- "Doina Gherman (Moldova)". Bureau of Educational and Cultural Affairs. Archived from the original on 13 June 2022.
- "These women are building a safer, better world". Embassy of the United States, Niamey. Archived from the original on 21 April 2022.
