= Igor Grosu =

President of the Moldovan Parliament since 2021

Igor Grosu MP
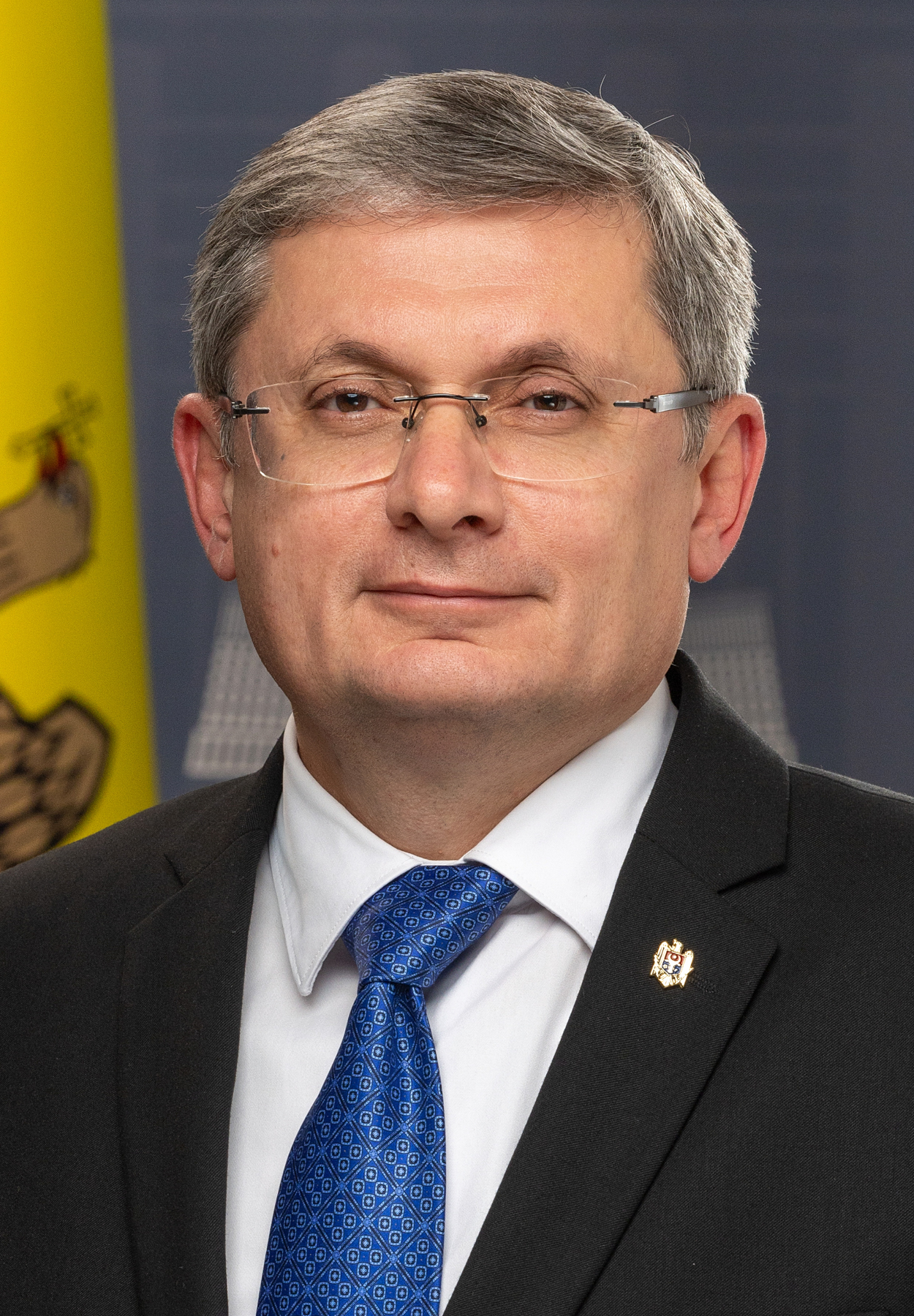
- Official portrait, 2025

13th President of the Moldovan Parliament
- Incumbent
- Assumed office 29 July 2021
- President: Maia Sandu
- Prime Minister: Aureliu Ciocoi (acting); Natalia Gavrilița; Dorin Recean; Alexandru Munteanu; Eugen Osmochescu (acting); Vasile Tofan
- Deputy: Mihai Popșoi; Vlad Batrîncea; Doina Gherman
- Preceded by: Zinaida Greceanîi

President of the Party of Action and Solidarity
- Incumbent
- Assumed office 15 May 2022; Acting: 9 December 2020 – 15 May 2022
- Preceded by: Maia Sandu

Member of the Moldovan Parliament
- Incumbent
- Assumed office 9 March 2019
- Parliamentary group: Party of Action and Solidarity

Deputy Minister of Education
- In office 15 August 2012 – 12 August 2015
- President: Nicolae Timofti
- Prime Minister: Vlad Filat; Iurie Leancă; Chiril Gaburici; Natalia Gherman (acting); Valeriu Streleț
- Minister: Maia Sandu; Corina Fusu

Personal details
- Born: 30 November 1972 (age 53) Andrușul de Sus, Moldavian SSR, Soviet Union
- Citizenship: Moldova; Romania
- Party: Party of Action and Solidarity
- Education: Moldova State University

Igor Grosu (born 30 November 1972) is a Moldovan politician who is the President of the Parliament of Moldova since 29 July 2021. He has been a member of the Moldovan Parliament since March 2019. Grosu has been the leader (first acting leader) of the Party of Action and Solidarity (PAS) since 9 December 2020.

== Career ==
Igor Grosu became the Deputy Minister of Education in Moldova under Minister of Education, Maia Sandu. In August 2015, the Prime Minister of Moldova, Valeriu Streleț, appointed Grosu as the Prime Minister's principal consultant for Science, Education, Health Policies and Social Protection. The next Acting Prime Minister, Gheorghe Brega, dismissed Grosu a few months after he was appointed.

When Maia Sandu founded the Action and Solidarity Party (PAS) in 2015–2016, Grosu joined as a founder-member of the party and became the party's General Secretary. In the 2019 parliamentary elections, he ran for the ACUM Platforma DA - PAS Electoral Bloc in 20th Constituency-Strășeni but was defeated by the incumbent Prime Minister, Pavel Filip. However, he was elected as deputy from the national list of the ACUM bloc, which had come in 4th place.

He also founded a few non-governmental organizations, such as: Amnesty International Moldova, National Assistance, the Non-Gov Organizations Information Center of Moldova CONTACT (Romanian: Centrul național de asistență și informare a ONG-urilor din Moldova "CONTACT"), Pro-Democracy Association (Romanian: Asociația Pro-Democrație), National Youth Council of Moldova (Romanian: Consiliul Național al Tineretului din Moldova), and the Analysis and Evaluation Center of Reform (Romanian: Centrul de analiză și evaluare a reformelor).

In December 2020, after Maia Sandu won the presidential elections and resigned her party membership, Igor Grosu became the Acting President of PAS. President Sandu appointed Grosu on 25 March 2021 to form the Government, even though she expressed her support to the dissolution of the Parliament in order to held snap parliamentary elections. After the majority of deputies in the Parliament (PSRM, ȘOR and ex-PDM factions), the proposal was automatically rejected. The Parliament was dissolved on 28 April and snap elections were held on 11 July later that year.

He ran in 2021 parliamentary elections with the first position in the national list. PAS won then the best electoral result of any liberal party in the Moldovan history (by percentage): 52,80% of votes (63/101 MPs). On July 29, he was voted by 64 MPs the President of the Moldovan Parliament.

On 6 July 2023, Grosu and President Maia Sandu together commemorated Stalin's 1949 purge and deportation of political opponents in Moldova. He said that those who survived the deportation to Siberia and returned to Moldova continued the battle against the Soviet regime:

They preserved the memory, passed it on to the children, and the religious holidays.. If you don't know your history and your past, you risk repeating it. What we see now in our Ukrainian neighbours are hundreds of thousands of displaced citizens and children separated from their families. It's a kind of deja-vu, and you get the impression that what's left of this rotten [Russian] empire is putting human destinies on the altars of sacrifice.

In November 2023 on its 90th anniversary, Grosu in Parliament condemned the Ukrainian Holodomor, as well as the recent Russian invasion of Ukraine and genocide of Ukrainians. The Parliament approved his statement. He said:

Our attachment to universal human values obliges us today to stand in solidarity with the Ukrainian people to end the policy of genocide against the Ukrainian people in the 21st century and to maintain peace and freedom on the European continent.. No imperial power has any chance of success when there is unity.. For the Russian Empire, regardless of what it calls itself today, the value of human life means nothing.. And what is happening today in Ukraine - in Kyiv, Bucha, Irpin, Melitopol, Kharkiv, Kherson, and hundreds of other towns and villages - is a confirmation of the criminal nature of this regime.. But the time will come, and we know that this will happen after Ukraine's victory in the war, when these atrocities will be condemned and punished.

In April 2024 Grosu as House President remembered the Soviet role in the Moldovan famine of 1946-47. In Moldova the third Saturday of April is designated as the Day of Remembrance for the Victims of the Organized Famine of 1946–1947, that killed an estimated 300,000 people. He remarked on the Luceafărul Theatre performance of the documentary show "1946" that was then touring the country. He said:

This was a horrific famine orchestrated by the Soviet communist regime that caused immense suffering for hundreds of thousands of people.. We must discuss and remember this dark period of our past. It is our duty to shed light on the famine, the deportations, and all the atrocities inflicted by authoritarian and dictatorial regimes throughout history.

Grosu's politics later attracted the attention of Dmitri Medvedev, who presided over Russia from 2008 to 2012, and characterized Grosu as a "hypocritical fool", claiming Romanian responsibility for the famine despite the Soviet Union holding control of Moldova at the time.
