= Mihai Popșoi =

Moldovan politician

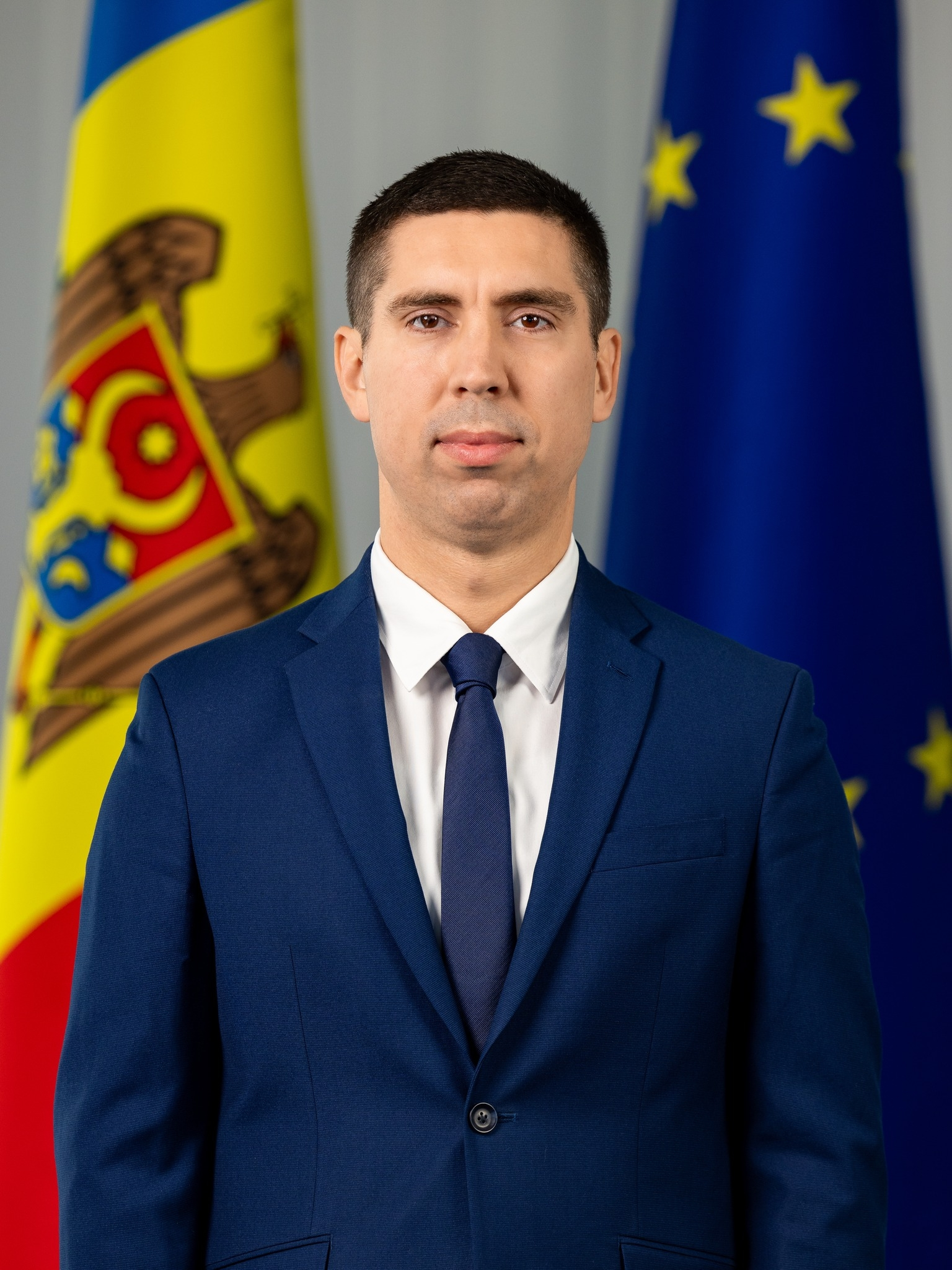
- Official portrait, 2025

Deputy Prime Minister of Moldova
- Incumbent
- Assumed office 29 January 2024 Serving with: Vladimir Bolea
- President: Maia Sandu
- Prime Minister: Dorin Recean; Alexandru Munteanu; Eugen Osmochescu (acting); Vasile Tofan
- Preceded by: Nicu Popescu

Minister of Foreign Affairs
- Incumbent
- Assumed office 29 January 2024
- President: Maia Sandu
- Prime Minister: Dorin Recean; Alexandru Munteanu; Eugen Osmochescu (acting); Vasile Tofan
- Preceded by: Nicu Popescu (as Minister of Foreign Affairs and European Integration)

Member of the Moldovan Parliament
- In office 22 October 2025 – 1 November 2025
- Succeeded by: Veronica Cupcea
- Parliamentary group: Party of Action and Solidarity
- In office 9 March 2019 – 29 January 2024
- Succeeded by: Ana Speianu
- Parliamentary group: Party of Action and Solidarity
- Constituency: Chișinău
- Majority: 9,865 (37.0%)

Vice President of the Moldovan Parliament
- In office 8 June 2019 – 29 January 2024 Serving with: Ion Ceban; Alexandru Slusari; Monica Babuc; Vlad Batrîncea; Vladimir Vitiuc
- President: Igor Dodon; Maia Sandu
- Prime Minister: Maia Sandu; Ion Chicu; Aureliu Ciocoi (acting); Natalia Gavrilița; Dorin Recean
- Speaker: Zinaida Greceanîi; Igor Grosu
- Succeeded by: Doina Gherman

President of the Committee of Ministers of the Council of Europe
- In office 14 November 2025 – 15 May 2026
- Preceded by: Ian Borg
- Succeeded by: Isabelle Berro-Amadeï

Personal details
- Born: Mihail Popșoi; 10 March 1987 (age 39) Kotchikha, Russian SFSR, Soviet Union
- Citizenship: Moldova; Romania
- Party: Party of Action and Solidarity
- Spouse: Ecaterina Vâlcu (m. 2009)
- Children: Ion
- Education: Moldova State University; University of York; Central European University; University of Milan

Mihai Popșoi (born 10 March 1987) is a Moldovan politician currently serving as Deputy Prime Minister and Minister of Foreign Affairs of Moldova.

From 2019 to 2024 he served as the Vice President of the Moldovan Parliament. Since 10 September 2017, Mihail Popșoi has been the Vice President and International Secretary of the ruling Action and Solidarity Party of Moldova.

== Early life and education ==
Mihail Popșoi was born on 10 March 1987 in Kotchiha, Kirov region of the Russian SSR, USSR. After his parents returned to Moldova where his father Ion Popșoi soon after fought in the Transnistria War, his family settled in Vadul lui Vodă, Chișinău Municipality, Moldova.

After Mihail Popșoi graduated from the Stefan Vodă high school in Vadul lui Vodă in 2006, he went on to study a BA in International Relations at Moldova State University in Chișinău and graduated in 2009. During his second academic year (2007–2008), he obtained an Erasmus Mundus grant from the European Commission and studied at the Middle Technical East University in Ankara, Turkey. He went on to pursue an MA programme at Moldova State University in American Studies. In 2014, Popșoi obtained an MA scholarship from the European Union where he studied Public Policy at the Central European University (2014–2015) in Budapest, Hungary and University of York (2015–2016), United Kingdom. After MA graduation, he pursued a PhD programme in Political Studies at University of Milan, Italy, where he has been researching the challenges of democratic consolidation and the disconnect between Europeanization and democratization in Georgia, Moldova, and Ukraine.

== Professional activities ==
Mihail Popșoi began his career as a program manager at the NATO Information and Documentation Center in Moldova in 2009. A year later, he was hired by the Political and Economic Section of the American Embassy in Moldova and provided in-house political analysis for four years. His portfolio included following and scrutinizing the legislative process, relations with political parties and a regional focus on the Gagauzia Autonomy. In his capacity as political analyst, he received a deeper understanding of Moldova's political processes and decision-making during 2010–2014.

In 2014, Mihail Popșoi left abroad for further graduate studies which allowed him to become a freelance public policy and political risk consultant. Between 2014 and 2019 he has provided analytical commentaries and carried out research on Moldova and the broader region for IHS Inc., NewsBase Ltd., Jamestown Foundation, American Enterprise Institute, Foreign Policy Research Institute, Chatham House, Global Focus, Konrad Adenauer Foundation, Friedrich Ebert Foundation and Foreign Policy Association of Moldova among others.

Mihail Popșoi entered politics in September 2017 when he was elected as the Vice President of the Action and Solidarity Party (PAS). He is responsible for the international affairs portfolio, serving as an international secretary. He was elected to the Parliament during the 2019 legislative election which were held on 24 February 2019. He placed 8th on the electoral list of the Electoral Bloc ACUM, though was actually elected in the single member constituency number 32, which encompassed Chișinău suburbs. He won with 9,865 votes (37.03%) against five opponents, including a three-term mayor of Chișinău (Dorin Chirtoacă) and a six-term mayor of Budești (Nina Costiuc). On 8 June 2019, he was elected as the Deputy Speaker of Parliament.

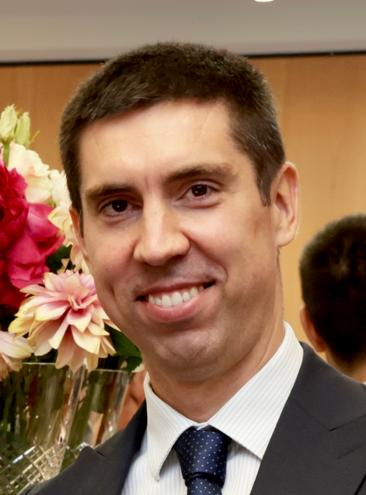
Mihail Popșoi visiting Leinster House, Ireland on 26 July 2024

As Deputy Speaker of Parliament, he is responsible for coordinating the activity of four standing committees: Legal Committee, Appointments and Immunities, Committee for Human Rights and Inter-ethnic Relations, Committee for National Security, Defense and Public Order, Committee on Foreign Policy and European Integration of which Mihail Popșoi is a member. He is a member of several parliamentary delegations, including to the Parliamentary Assembly of the Council of Europe, Euronest Parliamentary Assembly and EU-Moldova Parliamentary Association Committee. The latter delegation was established in 2015 following the signing of the EU-Moldova Association Agreement. The delegation is co-chaired by Mihail Popșoi along with a Member of the European Parliament. They preside together over bi-annual meetings of the joint EU-Moldova Parliamentary Association Committee. Mihail Popșoi is also the chairperson of the Parliamentary Friendship Group with the Congress of the United States and Deputy Chairperson of the Parliamentary Friendship Group with the State Duma of the Russian Federation. He is also a member of Parliamentary Friendship Groups with Romania, Ukraine, Georgia, China, Japan, France, Germany, Sweden, and the Netherlands among others.

== Other activities ==
On 10 September 2017, the Congress of the Action and Solidarity Party (PAS) of Moldova elected Mihail Popșoi as the Vice president of the party, a position he still holds to the present day.

Mihai Popșoi is a member of the Foreign Policy Association of Moldova.

Popșoi speaks fluently Romanian (at a native level), English, and Russian.

== Publications ==
During his professional career, Mihail Popșoi has published several analytical materials and studies. Most of his publication and blog posts can be found on his personal website.

- Moldova Cannot Own its Future unless it Breaks with its Past, Slovakia, October, 2014.
- The 'billion dollar protests' in Moldova are threatening the survival of the country's political elite, London-Chisinau, 2015.
- EU Draws Transnistria Closer to Avoid Looming Instability, The Jamestown Foundation, Washington DC, USA, 2015.
- Moldova's Great Disillusionment. New Eastern Europe Magazine, Krakow, Poland, 2016.
- How international media failed Moldova's protesters, United Kingdom, 2016.
- Talk of Reunification Opens Risks and Opportunities for Protest-Ridden Moldova, The Jamestown Foundation, Washington DC, USA, 2016.
- Controversial Ruling by Moldova's Constitutional Court Reintroduces Direct Presidential Elections, The Jamestown Foundation, Washington DC, USA, 2016.
- Transnistria Moves Toward Russia Despite Talk of Rapprochement with Moldova, The Jamestown Foundation, Washington DC, USA, 2016.
- Moldova's Reintegration Policy: Challenging the Status Quo. Book chapter, IOS Press. The Netherlands, 2016.
- Our man in Moldova, United Kingdom, 2016.
- Moldova Torn between Past and Future Ahead of Presidential Run-offs, Philadelphia, USA, 2016.
- Why Did a Pro-Russian Candidate Win the Presidency in Moldova?, Philadelphia, USA, 2016.
- Moldovan President Igor Dodon Suspended by the Constitutional Court, The Jamestown Foundation, Washington DC, USA, 2016.
- Avenues of Russian Military Intervention in Moldova, Washington, USA, 2018.
- Avenues of Russian Political Intervention in Moldova. Washington, USA, 2018.
- Moldova's Political Vulnerabilities at Systemic, Institutional and Individual Levels, Romania, 2018.
- Moldova's Societal Vulnerabilities: How Foreign Actors Shape 'Captive' Identities, Romania, 2018.
- State of Play Ahead of Moldova's Parliamentary Elections, The Jamestown Foundation, Washington DC, USA, 2018.

== Personal life ==
In 2006, Mihail Popșoi met Ecaterina Vâlcu and the couple eventually married in 2009. They have a son, Ion, born in 2013. According to income statements, Mihail Popșoi owns two apartments in Chișinău of 29.5 sq. m. and 65.6 sq. m. and a land plot in Vadul lui Vodă 0.12 ha. Popșoi's family also owns a 2004 Toyota Corolla bought in 2014.
