= Alexandru Slusari =

Moldovan politician

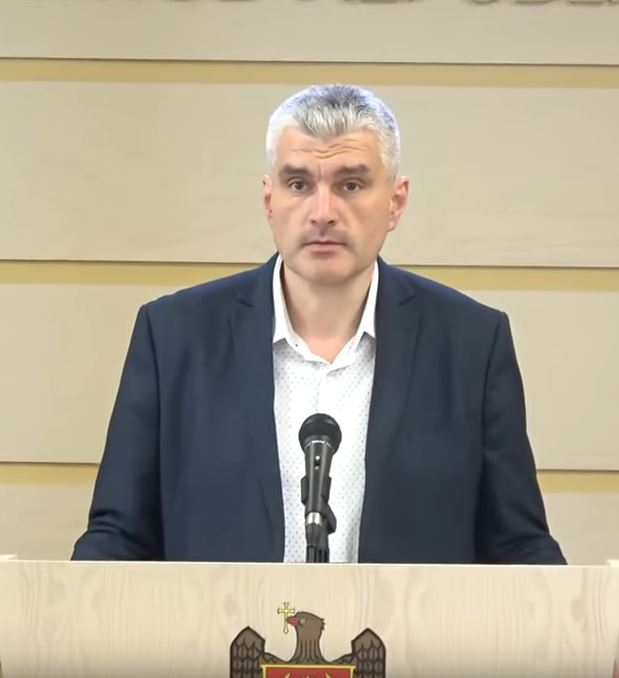
- Slusari in 2019

Vice President of the Moldovan Parliament
- In office 8 June 2019 – 23 July 2021 Serving with: Ion Ceban; Mihai Popșoi; Monica Babuc; Vlad Batrîncea; Vladimir Vitiuc
- President: Igor Dodon; Maia Sandu
- Prime Minister: Maia Sandu; Ion Chicu; Aureliu Ciocoi (acting)
- Speaker: Zinaida Greceanîi

Member of the Moldovan Parliament
- In office 9 March 2019 – 23 July 2021
- Parliamentary group: Dignity and Truth Platform

Personal details
- Born: 11 July 1974 (age 52) Chișinău, Moldavian SSR, Soviet Union
- Party: Dignity and Truth Platform Party
- Children: 1
- Education: Moldova State University
- Profession: Jurist

Alexandru Slusari (also Alexandr; born 11 July 1974) is a Moldovan politician.

== Biography ==
Slusari is an ethnic Russian. He was the chairman of the Republican Association of the Agricultural Producers "UniAgroProtect" (2010–2017). Before, from 2013 by 2015, he was the deputy head of the People Force Party (foregoer of the Dignity and Truth Platform). In 2014, at the Parliamentary elections, he was number two on this list of this party. In 2019, at the parliamentary elections, he was within ACUM Block on the election uninominal constituency no. 28 of the Chișinău. In the new legislature he held one out of four deputy head positions and preside over the Inquiry Committee on clearing up all the circumstances of robbing the Republic of Moldova banking system and banking fraud investigation.

He is married and has one child.
