= Vlad Batrîncea =

Moldovan politician

Vlad Batrîncea MP
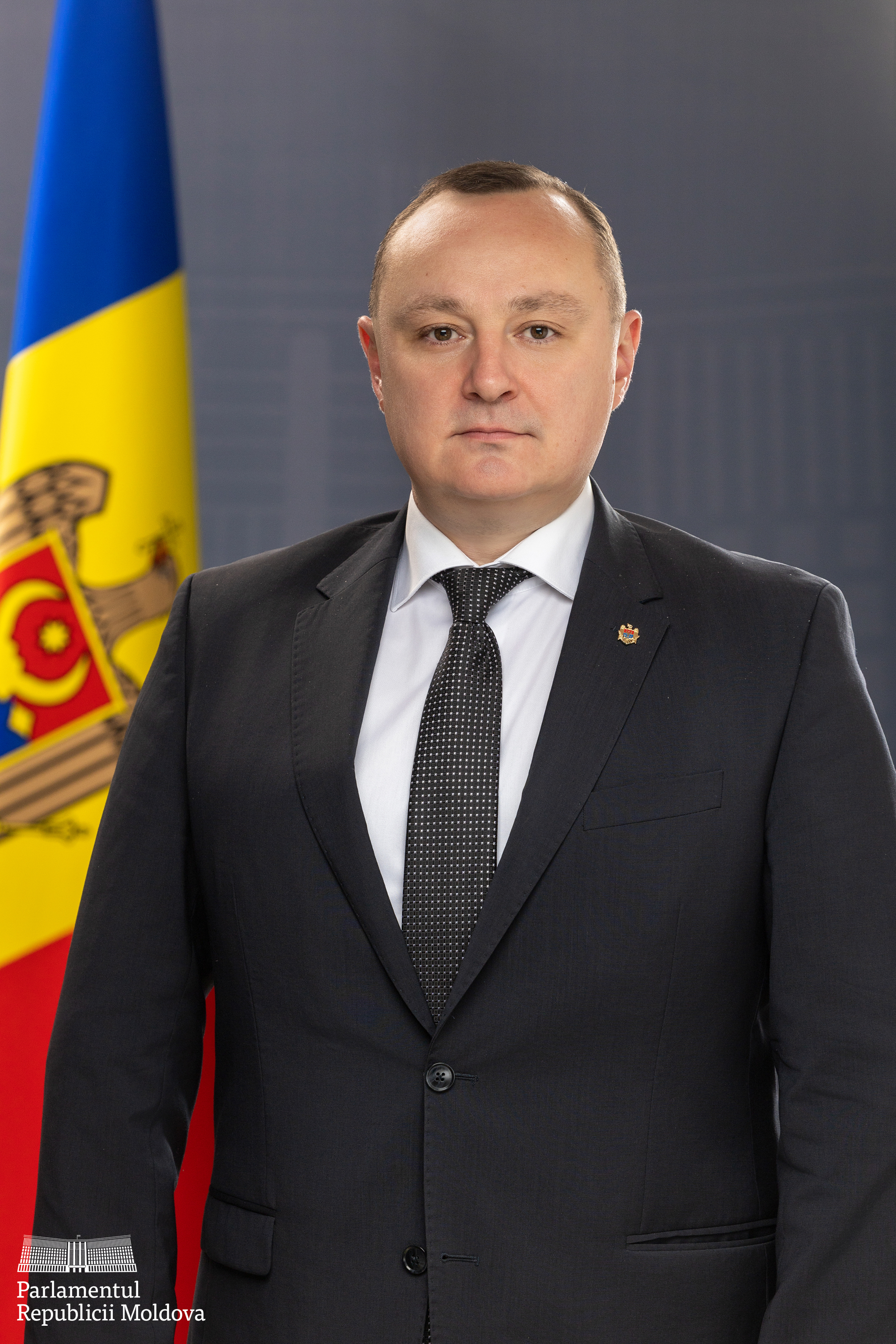
- Official portrait, 2025

Vice President of the Moldovan Parliament
- Incumbent
- Assumed office 29 November 2019 Serving with: Doina Gherman
- President: Igor Dodon; Maia Sandu
- Prime Minister: Ion Chicu; Aureliu Ciocoi (acting); Natalia Gavrilița; Dorin Recean; Alexandru Munteanu; Eugen Osmochescu (acting); Vasile Tofan
- Speaker: Zinaida Greceanîi; Igor Grosu
- Preceded by: Ion Ceban

Member of the Moldovan Parliament
- Incumbent
- Assumed office 9 December 2014
- Parliamentary group: Party of Socialists; Bloc of Communists and Socialists

Executive Secretary of the Party of Socialists
- In office 29 January 2022 – 10 April 2023
- Succeeded by: Igor Dodon

Personal details
- Born: 31 March 1981 (age 45) Chișinău, Moldavian SSR, Soviet Union
- Party: Party of Socialists (since 2011)
- Other political affiliations: Party of Communists (until 2011)
- Awards: Order of Work Glory

Vlad Batrîncea (born 31 March 1981) is a Moldovan politician who currently serves as Vice President of the Parliament of Moldova (since November 2019). He was the executive secretary of the Party of Socialists of the Republic of Moldova (PSRM) and the de facto leader of the party from 2022 to 2023.

== Career ==
=== Education ===
Batrincea was registered at the Faculty of History and philosophy of Moldovan State University in 1999. After the first year of studies he was expelled due to overdue and absent hours. He followed his studies at Slavonic University in Moldova, where he took his master's degree in international law. Batrîncea is also a chess player.

=== Political career ===
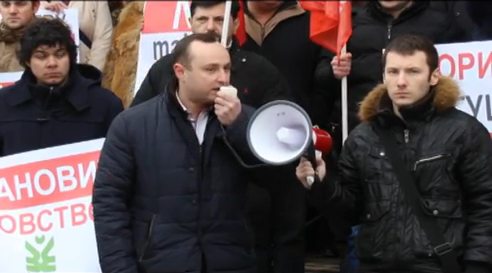
Batrîncea at a PSRM protest

He was a Member of the Party of Communists of the Republic of Moldova until 2011. In that year he was part of Igor Dodon's group that left the communists, setting up the Party of Socialists of the Republic of Moldova. In PSRM, Batrîncea has been on a rapid rise, becoming a Member of the Republican Committee of the PSRM, a Member of the party's political Executive Committee, and since June 2013 – executive secretary of the party. In the parliamentary elections of 30 November 2014 in the Republic of Moldova, he ran for the post of deputy from PSRM, being the 7th in the list, and therefore won the mandate of deputy in the Parliament of the Republic of Moldova. Since March 9, 2019, he has been a member, from the PSRM fraction, in the Parliament of the Republic of Moldova. On 9 June 2019, Vlad Batrîncea was elected President of the PSRM fraction in the Parliament.

== Political position ==
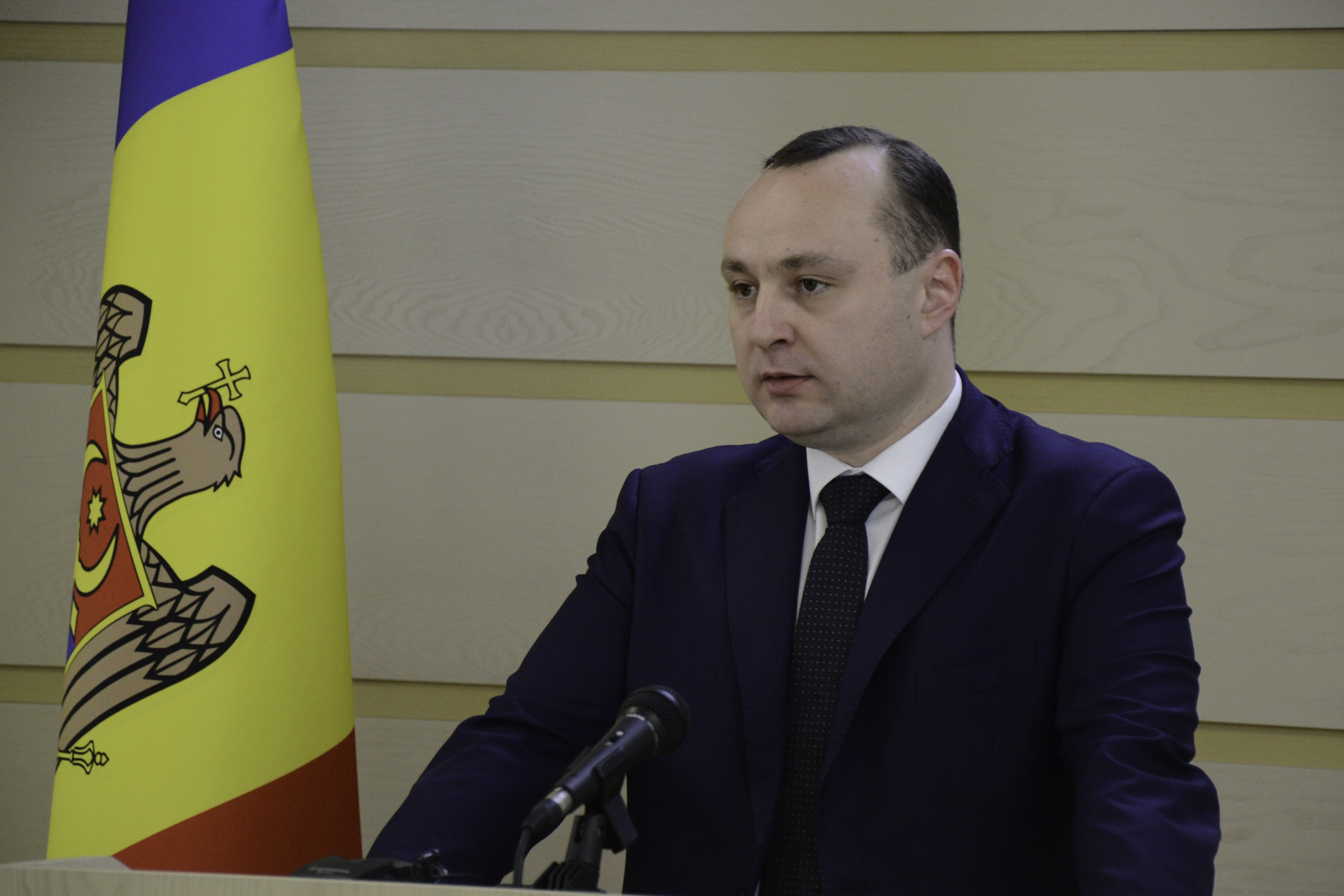
Batrîncea in 2020

As a member of the PSRM, Batrîncea is known for his strong pro-Russian stance, supporting Moldova's accession to the Eurasian Economic Union (Moldova currently has observer status in this organisation). He is also known for his populist rhetoric. In April 2022, Batrîncea led a failed attempt by the PSRM to dismiss Octavian Armașu as governor of the National Bank of Moldova.

Regarding the Russian invasion of Ukraine Batrîncea stated on 16 June 2023: "Russia is to blame for this war, and other politicians and important countries of the world are responsible for this war. I am talking about those who fuel militaristic rhetoric in every possible way."

== Controversies ==
On 10 December 2015, in the applause of his fellow party colleagues, Batrîncea destroyed the map of Greater Romania, a gesture in protest against an order of the Ministry of Education through which the map was to be distributed, by donation from an association, as teaching material, in the education system for use in history lessons. The next day, Liberal Deputy Alina Zotea addressed a request to Romanian President Klaus Iohannis, asking him to declare Batrîncea persona non grata and to ban him from entering Romania. Romanian Ambassador to Moldova Marius Lazurca did not consider Batrîncea's move an offense against his country. “A Moldovan politician wanted to demonstratively destroy an object with teaching use. Some of the deputies from Mr Batrîncea's party found it appropriate to applaud this gesture. Along with Mr Batrîncea was the Former Prime-Minister Zinaida Greceanîi, who did not applaude, which I find to be a proof of wisdom and moderation", said the ambassador. In 2018 Batrîncea stated that he did not regret his action, saying it was not an anti-Romanian gesture, but against a non-existing country. In 2021, the unionist deputy Vasile Șoimaru (PAS) gave Batrîncea another map of Greater Romania, saying "I found a destroyed map six years ago. If you allow me, I will return it to the one who may be sorry he did so then. Even if he is not sorry, I give him this map and ask him not to do it again if he wants to remain a colleague with us".

== Awards ==
- Order of Work Glory (2018)
