= Natalia Davidovici =

Moldovan politician and journalist (born 1971)

Natalia Davidovici MP
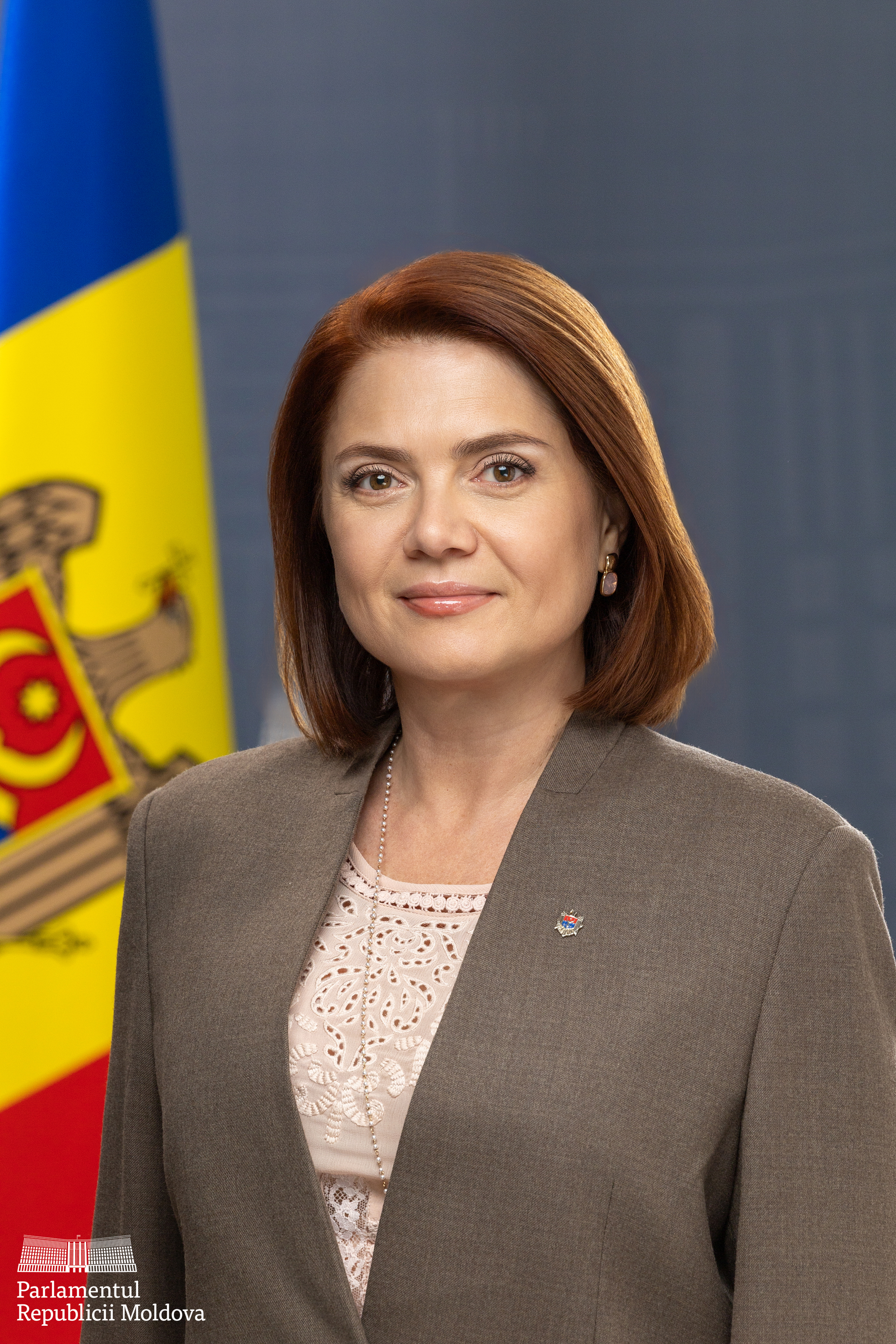
- Official portrait, 2025

Member of the Moldovan Parliament
- Incumbent
- Assumed office 23 July 2021
- Parliamentary group: Party of Action and Solidarity

Interethnic Relations Advisor to the President
- In office 23 February 2021 – 9 August 2021
- President: Maia Sandu
- Preceded by: Serghei Mișin

Personal details
- Born: 17 November 1971 (age 54) Chișinău, Moldavian SSR, Soviet Union
- Party: Party of Action and Solidarity (PAS)
- Education: Ion Creangă State Pedagogical University of Chișinău
- Profession: Journalist, politician

Natalia Davidovici (born 17 November 1971) is a Moldovan politician and journalist who currently serves in the Parliament of Moldova. She also served as presidential adviser to President Maia Sandu on interethnic issues.
