= Radu Marian =

Radu Marian may refer to:

- Radu Marian (politician) (born 1990), Moldovan politician
- Radu Marian (sopranist) (born 1977), Moldovan sopranist
- Radu Marian Petrescu (born 1982), Romanian football referee
