= Vălcineț =

Vălcineț may refer to several places in Moldova:

- Vălcineț, Călărași, a commune in Călărași District
- Vălcineț, Ocnița, a commune in Ocnița District
