= Vasile Grădinaru =

Moldovan jurist and politician (born 1982)

Vasile Grădinaru MP
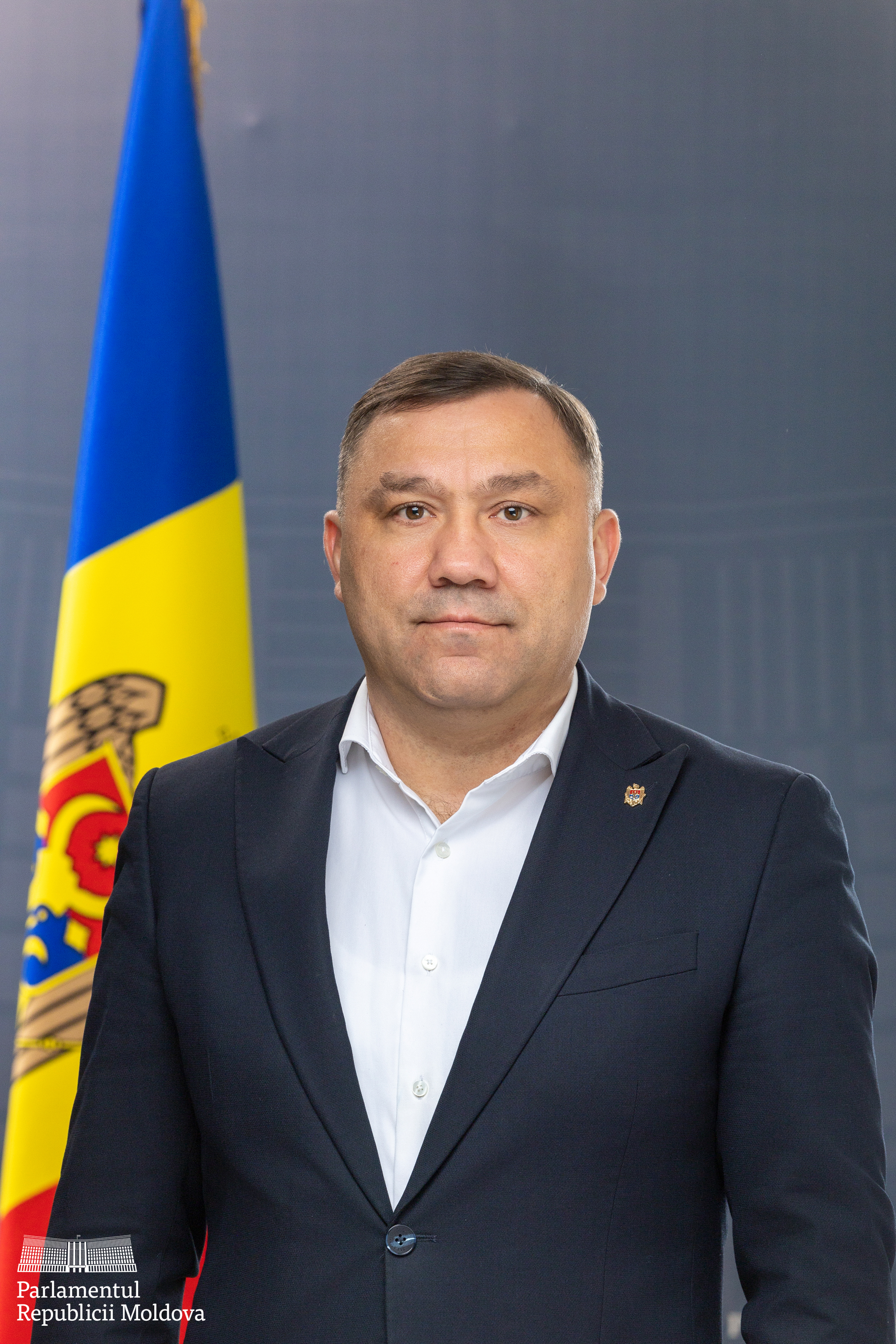
- Official portrait, 2025

Member of the Moldovan Parliament
- Incumbent
- Assumed office 23 July 2021
- Parliamentary group: Party of Action and Solidarity

Member of the Chișinău Municipal Council
- In office 2 November 2019 – 23 July 2021

Personal details
- Born: 22 January 1982 (age 44) Călugăr, Moldavian SSR, Soviet Union
- Education: Moldova State University

Vasile Grădinaru (born 22 January 1982) is a Moldovan jurist and politician. He currently serves as Member of the Moldovan Parliament for PAS.
