= Diana Caraman =

Moldovan politician

Diana Caraman MP
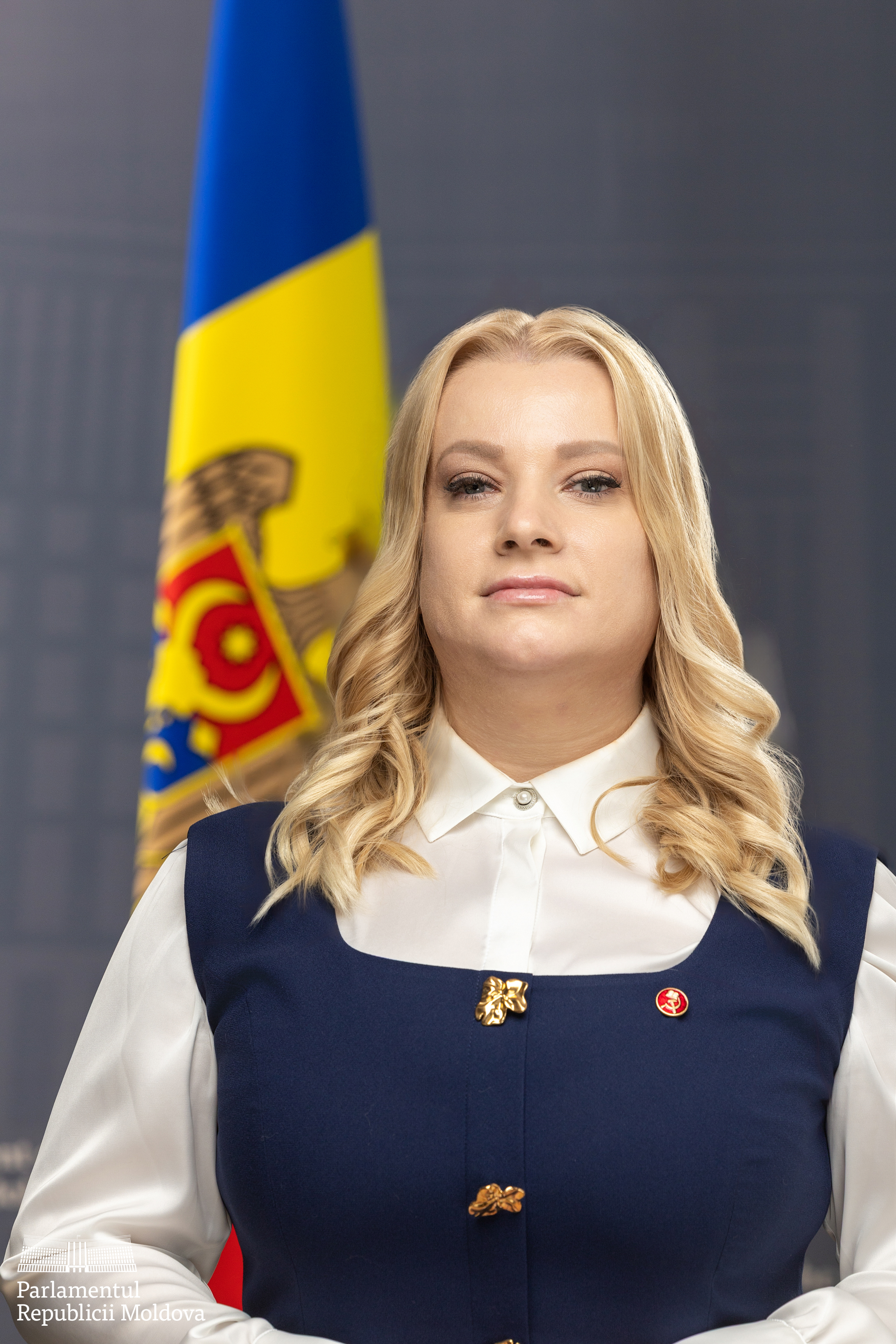
- Official portrait, 2025

Member of the Moldovan Parliament
- Incumbent
- Assumed office 23 July 2021
- Parliamentary group: Bloc of Communists and Socialists; Party of Communists

President of the Party of Communists
- Incumbent
- Assumed office 6 June 2026
- Preceded by: Vladimir Voronin

Personal details
- Born: 3 February 1990 (age 36) Chișinău, Moldavian SSR, Soviet Union
- Party: Party of Communists of the Republic of Moldova
- Education: Free International University of Moldova

Diana Caraman (born 3 February 1990) is a Moldovan economist and politician, serving as Member of the Moldovan Parliament since 2021. In June 2026, she became President of the Party of Communists of the Republic of Moldova.
