= Olga Ursu =

Moldovan economist

Olga Ursu MP
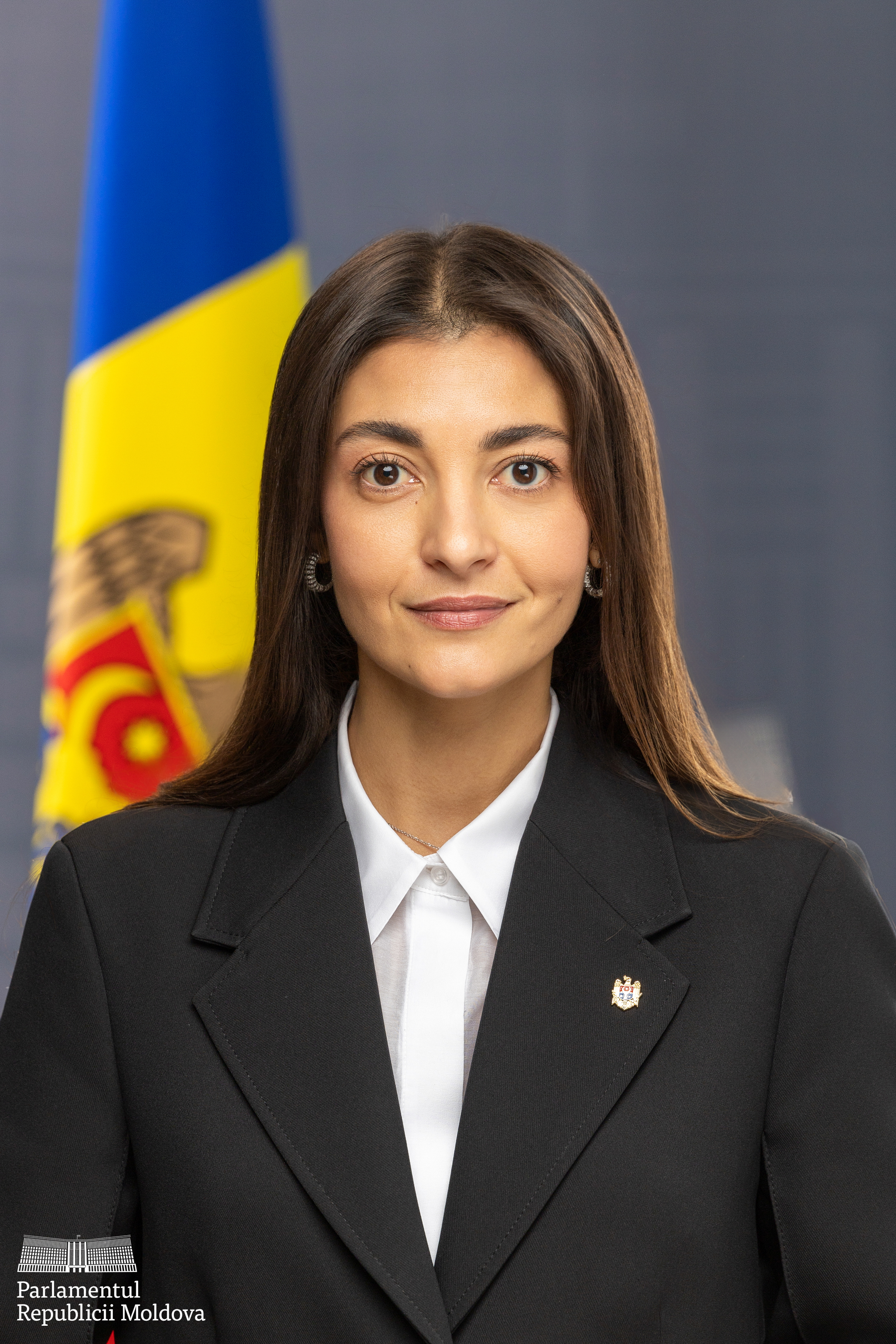
- Official portrait, 2025

Member of the Moldovan Parliament
- Incumbent
- Assumed office 22 October 2025
- Parliamentary group: Alternative Bloc

Deputy Mayor of Chișinău
- In office 15 July 2021 – 22 October 2025
- Preceded by: Inga Ionesii
- Succeeded by: Olesea Pșenițchi

Personal details
- Born: 19 May 1984 (age 42) Chișinău, Moldavian SSR, Soviet Union
- Party: National Alternative Movement
- Education: Academy of Economic Studies of Moldova

Olga Ursu (born 19 May 1984) is a Moldovan economist serving as Member of the Moldovan Parliament since 2025.
