= Constantin Starîș =

Moldovan journalist and politician

Constantin Starîș MP
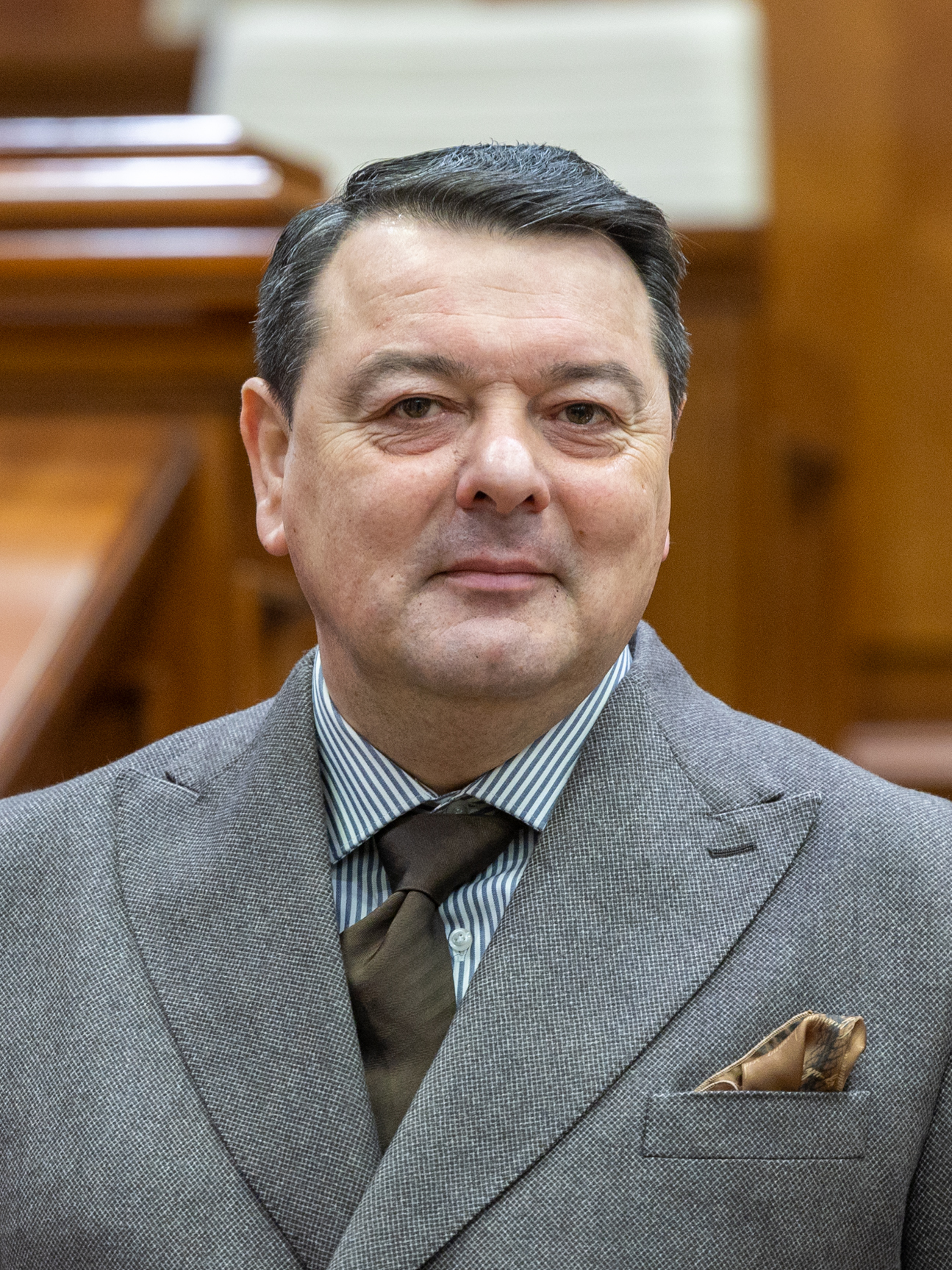
- Starîș in 2026

Member of the Moldovan Parliament
- Incumbent
- Assumed office 23 July 2021
- Parliamentary group: Bloc of Communists and Socialists; Party of Communists
- In office 24 December 2010 – 9 December 2014
- Parliamentary group: Party of Communists

Personal details
- Born: 25 October 1971 (age 54) Brînzenii Noi, Moldavian SSR, Soviet Union
- Education: Moldova State University

Constantin Starîș (born 25 October 1971) is a Moldovan journalist and politician. He is a Member of the Moldovan Parliament.
