= Moldovan Volunteers' Movement =

The Moldovan Volunteers' Movement (Romanian: Mişcarea Voluntarilor din Moldova, MVM) was a political party in Moldova.

== History ==
MVM was registered on December 25, 1992. The party contested the February 1994 elections as part of the Alliance of the Christian Democratic Popular Front, alongside the Christian Democratic Popular Front (FPCD) and the Christian Democratic Youth Organisation (OTCD). The alliance received 8% of the vote, winning 9 of the 104 seats and becoming the fourth-largest faction in Parliament.

Prior to the 1998 elections the alliance broke up, with the FPCD joining the Democratic Convention of Moldova. The OTCD did not contest any further elections.
