= List of international prime ministerial trips made by Alexandru Munteanu =

This is a list of international trips made by Alexandru Munteanu, the Prime Minister of Moldova (1 November 2025 – 8 July 2026).

During his term in office he made:

- One visit to Belgium, Switzerland, Ukraine, Croatia, Bulgaria, Luxembourg and Poland.
- Two visits to Romania.

== 2025 ==
#	Country	Location	Date	Details
1	Romania	Bucharest	13 November	Met with: Nicușor Dan – President of Romania; Ilie Bolojan – Prime Minister of Romania; Mircea Abrudean – President of the Senate; Sorin Grindeanu – President of the Chamber of Deputies; Margareta, Custodian of the Romanian Crown
2	Belgium	Brussels	17–18 November	Attended the inaugural EU Enlargement Forum. Met with: António Costa – President of the European Council; Kaja Kallas – Vice-President of the European Commission; High Representative for Foreign Affairs and Security Policy; Marta Kos – European Commissioner for Enlargement; Nicu Ștefănuță – Vice-President of the European Parliament; Milojko Spajić – Prime Minister of Montenegro; Siegfried Mureșan – Member of the European Parliament; Victor Negrescu – Member of the European Parliament; Dan Barna – Member of the European Parliament

== 2026 ==
#	Country	Location	Date	Details
3	Switzerland	Davos	19–22 January	Attended the 2026 World Economic Forum. Held bilateral talks with: Andrej Plenković – Prime Minister of Croatia; Luc Frieden – Prime Minister of Luxembourg; Brigitte Haas – Prime Minister of Liechtenstein; Marta Kos – European Commissioner for Enlargement; Valdis Dombrovskis – European Commissioner for Economy and Productivity and Implementation and Simplification; Taras Kachka – Deputy Prime Minister of Ukraine for European and Euro-Atlantic Integration; Oleksii Sobolev – Minister of Economy, Environment and Agriculture of Ukraine; Oana Țoiu – Minister of Foreign Affairs of Romania; Dragoș Pîslaru – Minister of European Investments and Projects of Romania; Nicolas Forissier – Minister Delegate for Foreign Trade and Economic Attractiveness of France; Odile Renaud-Basso – President of the European Bank for Reconstruction and Development; Maxim Timchenko – CEO of DTEK; Andrea Orcel – CEO of UniCredit; Richard Verma – Chief Administrative Officer of Mastercard; Jared Cohen – President of Global Affairs of Goldman Sachs
4	Ukraine	Kyiv	10 February	Met with: Volodymyr Zelenskyy – President of Ukraine; Yulia Svyrydenko – Prime Minister of Ukraine; Oleksandr Korniyenko – First Deputy Chairman of the Verkhovna Rada
5	Romania	Bucharest	31 March	Met with: Nicușor Dan – President of Romania; Ilie Bolojan – Prime Minister of Romania
6	Croatia	Dubrovnik	27–29 April	Attended the Three Seas Initiative Summit. Met with: Andrej Plenković – Prime Minister of Croatia; Nicușor Dan – President of Romania; Christian Stocker – Chancellor of Austria; Borjana Krišto – Chairwoman of the Council of Ministers of Bosnia and Herzegovina; Yulia Svyrydenko – Prime Minister of Ukraine; Nicole McGraw – United States Ambassador to Croatia
7	Bulgaria	Sofia	10 June	Attended the South-East European Cooperation Process Summit. Met with: Rumen Radev – Prime Minister of Bulgaria; Nataša Pirc Musar – President of Slovenia; Đuro Macut – Prime Minister of Serbia
8	Luxembourg	Luxembourg	15 June	Led the Moldovan delegation at the 2nd Moldova-European Union Accession Conference. Met with: Luc Frieden – Prime Minister of Luxembourg; Karl Nehammer – Vice-President of the European Investment Bank
9	Poland	Gdańsk	24–26 June	Attended the Ukraine Recovery Conference. Met with: Donald Tusk – Prime Minister of Poland; Yulia Svyrydenko – Prime Minister of Ukraine; Kristen Michal – Prime Minister of Estonia; Edi Rama – Prime Minister of Albania; Odile Renaud-Basso – President of the European Bank of Reconstruction and Development
