= Lilian Carp =

Moldovan politician (born 1978)

Lilian Carp MP
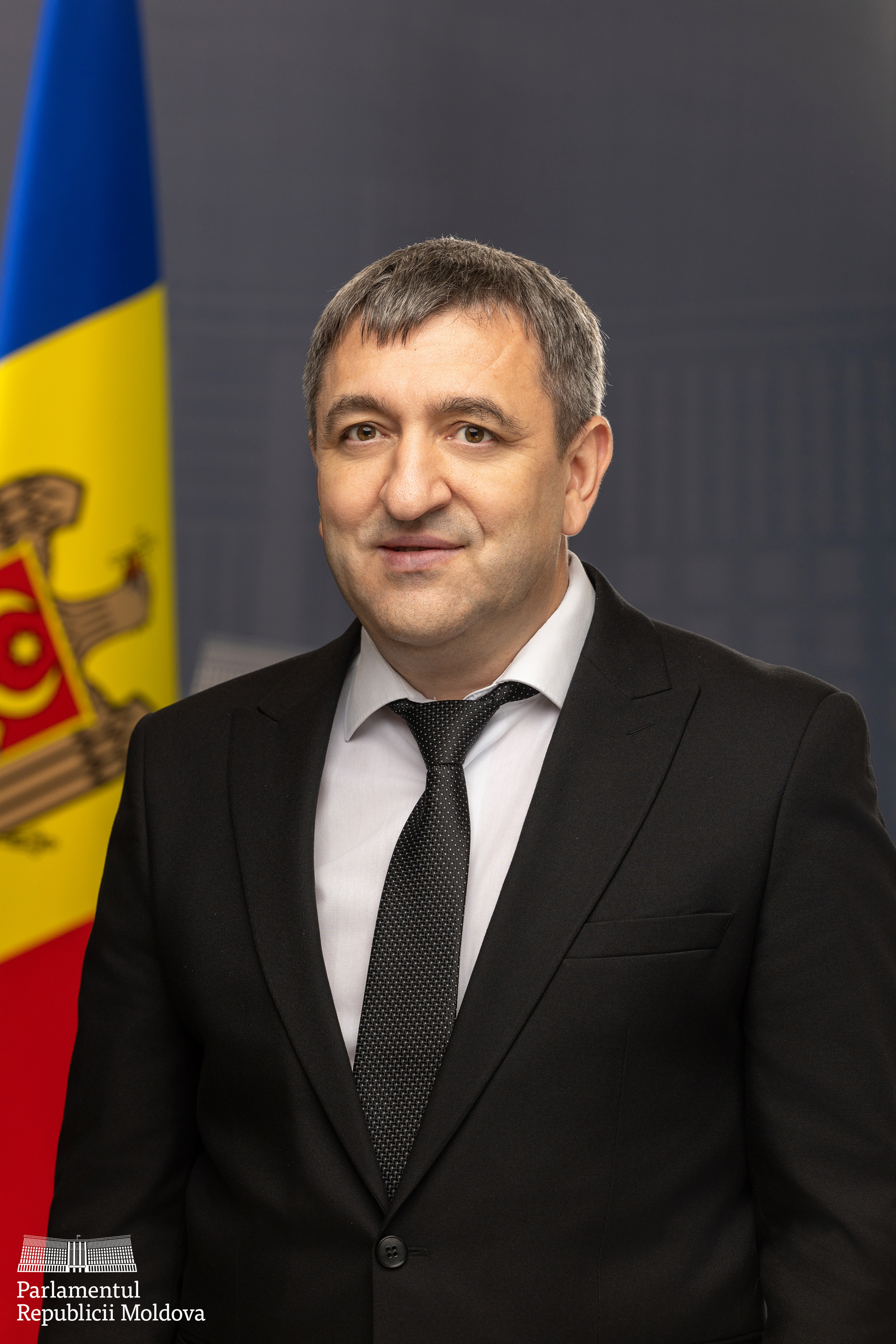
- Official portrait, 2025

Member of the Moldovan Parliament
- Incumbent
- Assumed office 9 December 2014
- Parliamentary group: Liberal Party; Party of Action and Solidarity

Personal details
- Born: 12 October 1978 (age 47) Zamciogi, Moldavian SSR, Soviet Union
- Party: Party of Action and Solidarity
- Education: Ion Creangă State Pedagogical University of Chișinău

Lilian Carp (born 12 October 1978) is a Moldovan politician currently serving as Member of the Moldovan Parliament since December 2014. He was elected in the 2014 Moldovan parliamentary election as a member of the Liberal Party of Moldova. He is now a leading member of the Party of Action and Solidarity.

In parliament, he was previously a member of the Committee on Culture, Education, Research, Youth, Sport and Media. He currently serves on the Committee on National Security, Defense and Public Order. In the 2023 Moldovan local elections he ran for Mayor of Chișinău, winning 28.27% of the vote but was defeated by Ion Ceban.

== Personal life ==
In 2001, he graduated from Ion Creangă State Pedagogical University of Chișinău in the Faculty of History and Ethnopedagogy. Since 2002 he has worked as a professor at the State University of Physical Education and Sport, and first entered politics in 2009 as part of the cabinet of Dorin Chirtoaca.

He is married and has one child.
