= Veronica Roșca =

Moldovan jurist and politician (born 1982)

Veronica Roșca MP
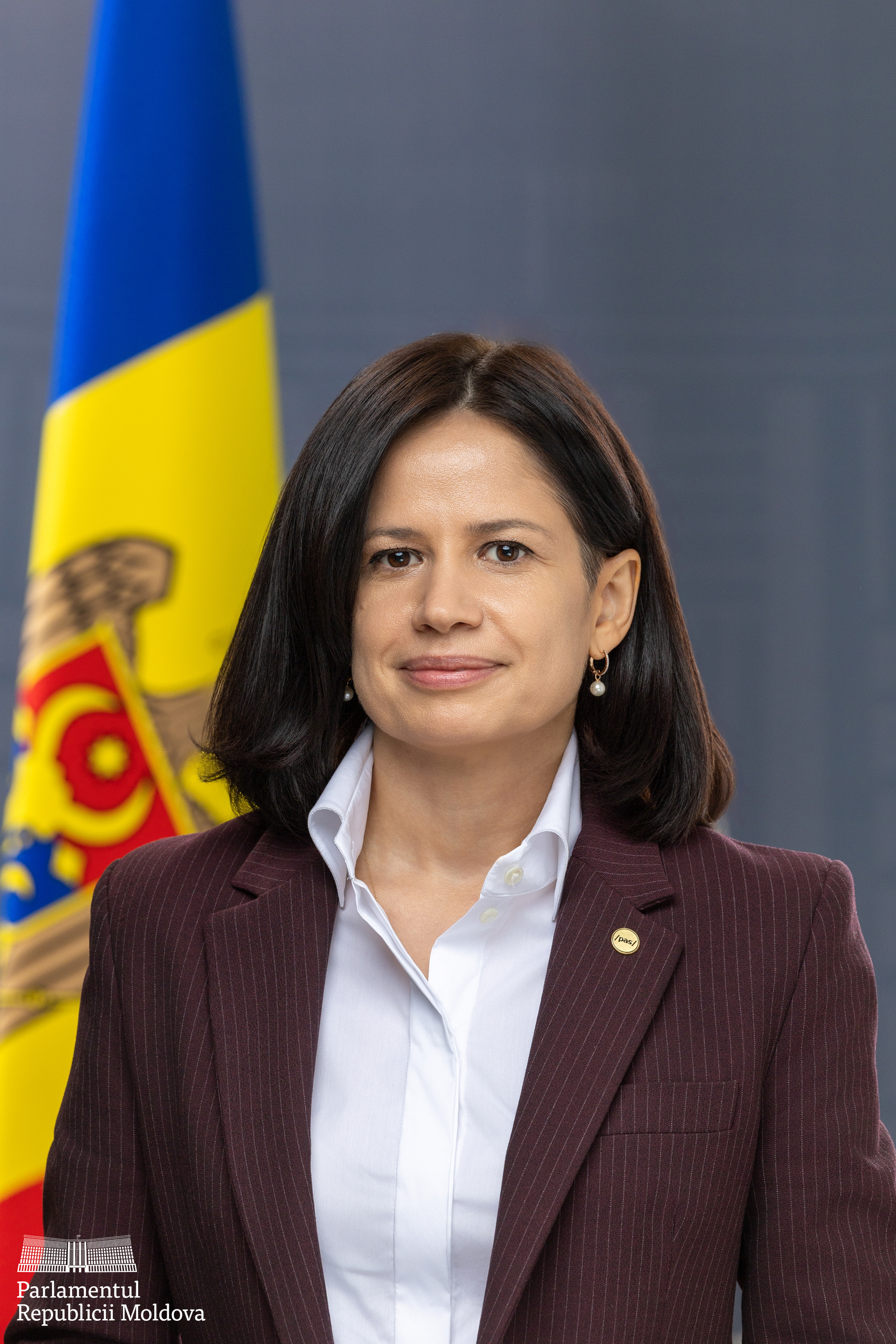
- Official portrait, 2025

Member of the Moldovan Parliament
- Incumbent
- Assumed office 9 March 2019
- Parliamentary group: Party of Action and Solidarity

Personal details
- Born: 3 February 1982 (age 44) Măgurele, Moldavian SSR, Soviet Union
- Education: Moldova State University

Veronica Roșca (born 3 February 1982) is a Moldovan jurist and politician. She currently serves as Member of the Moldovan Parliament. She is the Vice President of PAS and the Vice President of its parliamentary faction.
