= List of international prime ministerial trips made by Vasile Tofan =

This is a list of international trips made by Vasile Tofan, the current Prime Minister of Moldova.

Since he took office on 22 July 2026 he has made:

- One visit to Romania, United States, Belgium and Ukraine.

== 2026 ==
#	Country	Location	Date	Details
1	Romania	Bucharest	30 July	Met with: Nicușor Dan – President of Romania; Ilie Bolojan – Prime Minister of Romania; Mircea Abrudean – President of the Senate; Sorin Grindeanu – President of the Chamber of Deputies
2	United States	New York	23–26 September	Spoke at the 81st Session of the UN General Assembly. Met with: António Guterres – Secretary-General of the United Nations; Jonas Gahr Støre – Prime Minister of Norway; Micheál Martin – Prime Minister of Ireland; Rob Jetten – Prime Minister of the Netherlands; Andrej Plenković – Prime Minister of Croatia; Janez Janša – Prime Minister of Slovenia; Alexander De Croo – Administrator of the United Nations Development Programme; Jorge Moreira da Silva – Executive Director of the United Nations Office for Project Services; Mike Pompeo – Former United States Secretary of State; John Jovanovic – Chairman and President of the Export–Import Bank of the United States
3	Belgium	Brussels	4–6 October	Met with: Kaja Kallas – Vice-President of the European Commission; High Representative of the Union for Foreign Affairs and Security Policy; Marta Kos – European Commissioner for Enlargement; Dan Jørgensen – European Commissioner for Energy and Housing; Magnus Brunner – European Commissioner for Internal Affairs and Migration; Maria Luís Albuquerque – European Commissioner for Financial Services and the Savings and Investments Union; Bart De Wever – Prime Minister of Belgium
4	Ukraine	Kyiv	26 October	Met with: Volodymyr Zelenskyy – President of Ukraine; Serhii Koretskyi – Prime Minister of Ukraine; Ruslan Stefanchuk – Chairman of the Verkhovna Rada
