= Christian Democratic Youth Organisation =

Political party in Moldova

The Christian Democratic Youth Organisation (Romanian: Organizaţia Tineretului Creştin Democrat, OTCD) was a political party in Moldova.

== History ==
The party contested the February 1994 elections as part of the Alliance of the Christian Democratic Popular Front, alongside the Christian Democratic Popular Front (FPCD) and the Moldovan Volunteers' Movement (MVM). The alliance received 8% of the vote, winning 9 of the 104 seats and becoming the fourth-largest faction in Parliament.

Prior to the 1998 elections the alliance broke up, with the FPCD joining the Democratic Convention of Moldova. The OTCD did not contest any further national elections.
