= Larisa Voloh =

Moldovan politician

Larisa Voloh MP
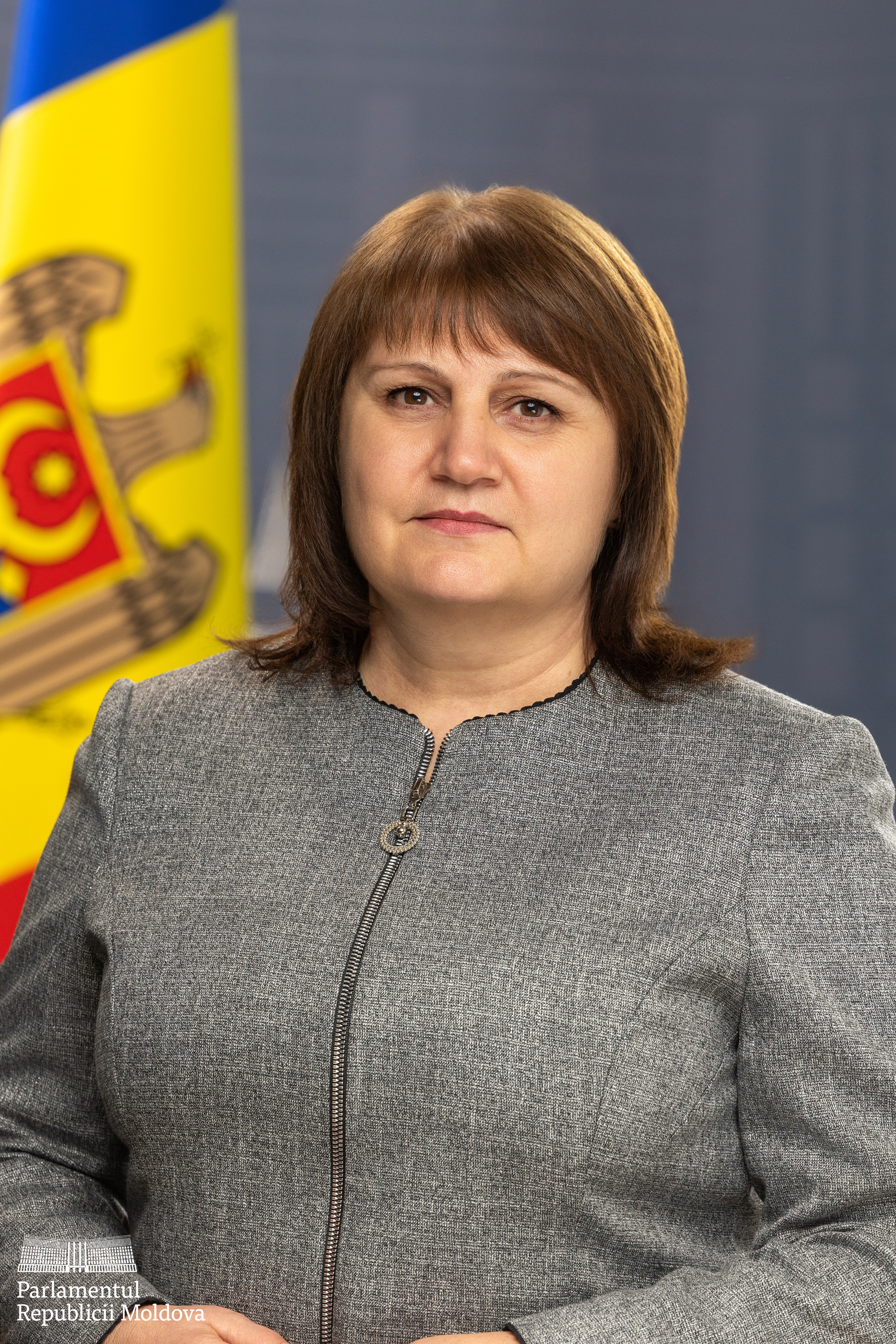
- Official portrait, 2025

Member of the Moldovan Parliament
- Incumbent
- Assumed office 23 July 2021
- Parliamentary group: Party of Action and Solidarity

Mayor of Palanca
- In office 3 June 2007 – 23 July 2021
- Succeeded by: Dumitru Cozlovschi

Personal details
- Born: 1 March 1971 (age 55) Cahul, Moldavian SSR, Soviet Union
- Education: Ion Creangă State Pedagogical University of Chișinău

Larisa Voloh (born 1 March 1971) is a Moldovan politician. She currently serves as member of the Moldovan Parliament.
