= Andrușul de Sus =

- Village
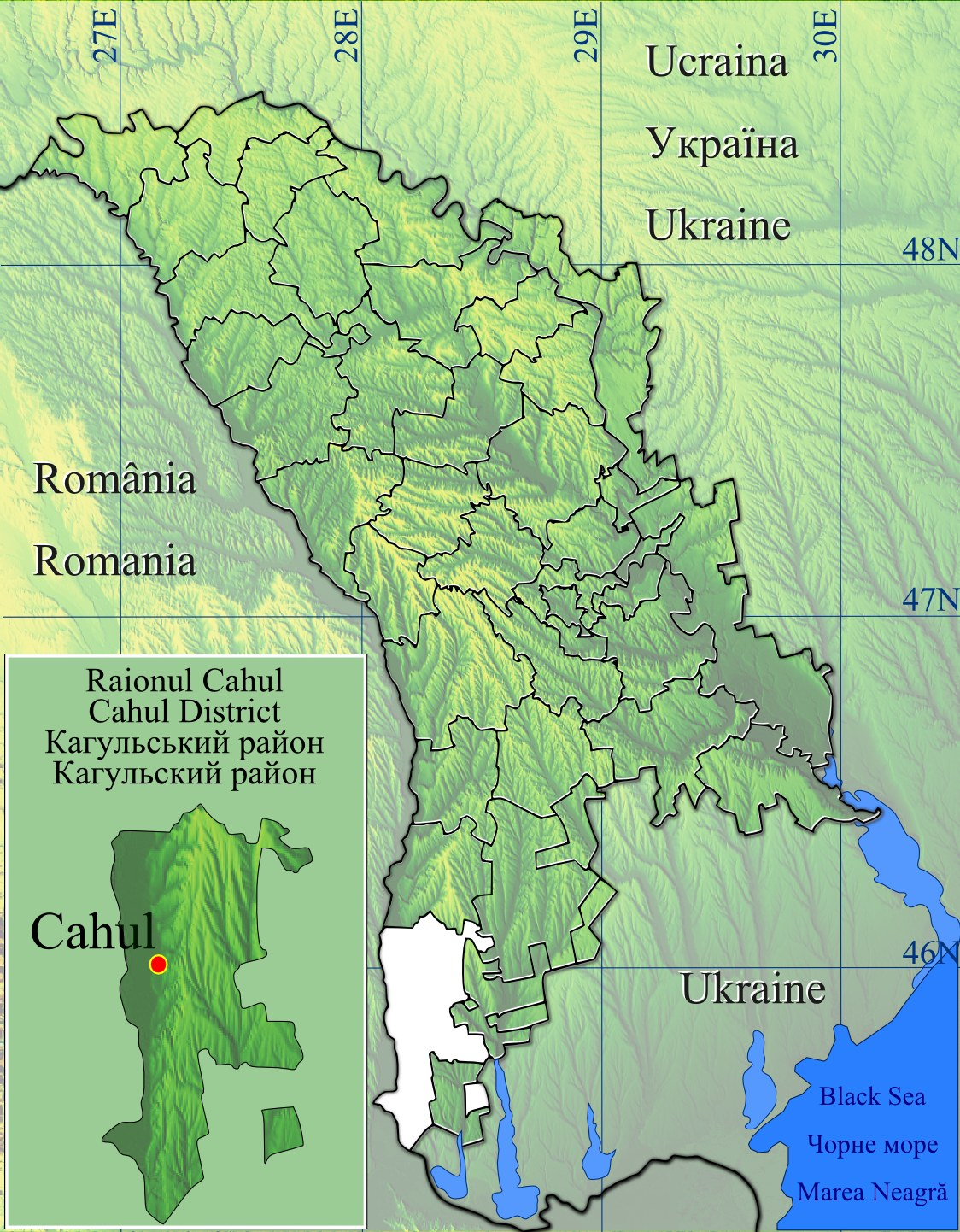
- Location within Cahul Location within Moldova
- Coordinates: 46°0′20″N 28°14′51″E
- Country: Moldova
- District: Cahul District

Government
  - Mayor: Sorin Ciobanu (PDM)

Population (2014 census)
  - Total: 1,425
- Time zone: UTC+2 (EET)
  - Summer (DST): UTC+3 (EEST)
- Postal code: MD-3912

Andrușul de Sus is a village in Cahul District, Moldova.
