= Parliament of Moldova =

Unicameral legislature of Moldova

Parliament of the Republic of Moldova Parlamentul Republicii Moldova
- 12th legislature

Type
- Type: Unicameral

History
- Founded: 23 June 1991; 35 years ago
- Preceded by: Supreme Soviet of the Moldavian SSR

Leadership
- President: Igor Grosu, PAS since 29 July 2021
- Vice President: Doina Gherman, PAS since 1 February 2024; Vlad Batrîncea, PSRM since 29 November 2019

Structure
- Seats: 101
- Political groups: Government (Tofan Cabinet) (55) PAS (55) (Note: PAS (37); Independent (16); DA (2)) Opposition (46) PSRM (17) (Note: PSRM announced separation from the Patriotic Electoral Bloc.) PCRM (8) (Note: PCRM announced separation from the Patriotic Electoral Bloc.) Alternative (7) (Note: MAN (3); PDCM (2); Independent (2)) PN (6) (Note: PN (5); Independent (1)) PPDA (6) Unaffiliated (2) (Note: PAC–CC (1); PVM (1))
- Committees: 12
- Length of term: 4 years

Elections
- Voting system: Closed list proportional representation
- First election: 27 February 1994
- Last election: 28 September 2025
- Next election: By 2029

Meeting place
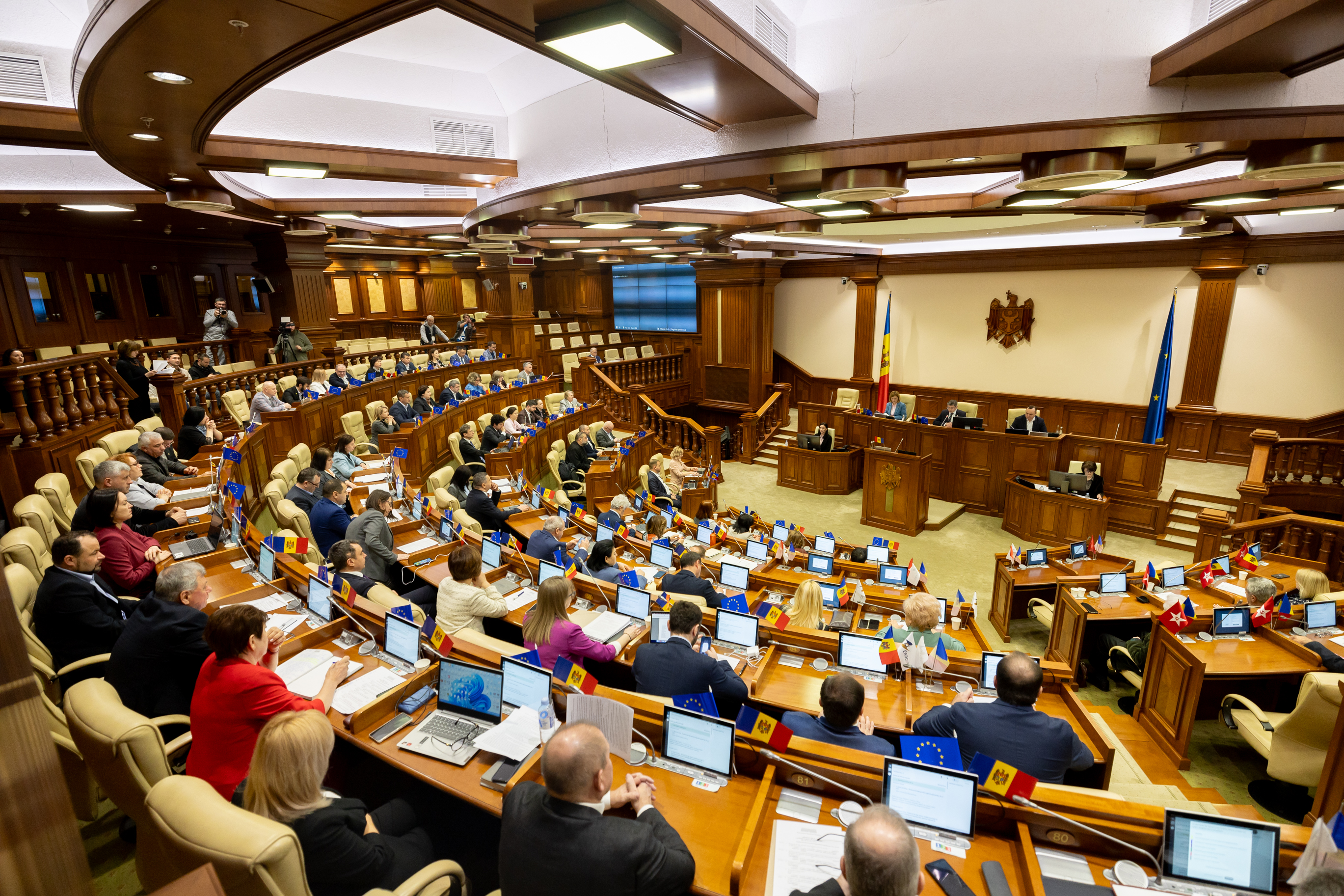

Website
- parlament.md

The Parliament of the Republic of Moldova (Romanian: Parlamentul Republicii Moldova) is the unicameral legislature and supreme representative body of the Republic of Moldova. It is the only state legislative authority and is composed of 101 MPs elected by universal vote, equal directly, secret and freely expressed on lists, for a term of four years. The president of the Parliament of the Republic of Moldova is elected by the Parliament, with a minimum of 52 votes.

The Constitutional Court of Moldova, on a proposal of the Central Electoral Commission, decides to validate or invalidate the mandate of the Member of Parliament. The mandate is invalid in the case of violation of electoral legislation. The Parliament is meeting at the convening of the Speaker of the Parliament within 30 days of the elections. The Parliament's mandate is prolonged until the legal meeting of the new composition. During this period the Constitution cannot be amended and organic laws cannot be adopted, amended or abrogated.

Parliamentary elections in Moldova took place on 28 September 2025. The ruling Party of Action and Solidarity (PAS) won a second consecutive majority government.

== Apparatus ==
The Parliament staff ensures an organizational, informational and technological assistance to activity of the Parliament, the Standing Bureau, standing committees, parliamentary factions and of deputies. The structure and the personal record of the parliament staff are approved by the Parliament.

== Legislative procedure ==
According to the Constitution of Moldova (1994), the Parliament is the supreme representative organ and the single legislative authority of the state. The right of legislative initiative belongs to the Members of Parliament, to the Speaker (excepting proposals to revise the Constitution) and to the Government. In exercise of this right MPs and the president of the state present to Parliament draft papers and legislative proposals, while the Government presents draft papers.

== Parliamentary factions ==
In order to form the working bodies and to organize the activity of the parliament, deputies form parliamentary factions composed of at least 5 deputies elected on the basis of lists of electoral contestants, as well as parliamentary factions with the same numerical composition as independent deputies. The parliamentary factions are constituted within 10 days after the legal constitution of the parliament.

=== 12th Moldovan Parliament ===
The 101 deputies elected on 28 September 2025 at the 2025 Moldovan parliamentary election. Parliamentary groups formed after the first sitting of the new parliament on 22 October 2025.

Political groups	Party leader	Faction leader	MPs	Status
Party of Action and Solidarity (PAS)	Igor Grosu	Doina Gherman	55	Government
Party of Socialists of the Republic of Moldova (PSRM)	Igor Dodon		17	Opposition
Party of Communists of the Republic of Moldova (PCRM)	Diana Caraman		8	Opposition
Alternative (BA)	Ion Ceban (MAN) Ion Chicu (PDCM)	Gaik Vartanean	7	Opposition
Our Party (PN)	Renato Usatîi		6	Opposition
Democracy at Home Party (PPDA)	Vasile Costiuc		6	Opposition
Independent			2	Opposition

== Structure of former legislatures ==
PCRM / PSM–MUE / BeAB / PMDP / BEMD / PAM / BTI / PFD / CDM / AFPCD / PPCD
1994	28 / 56 / 11 / 9
1998	40 / 24 / 11 / 26
2001	71 / 19 / 11
2005	56 / 34 / 11

PCRM / BCS / BEP / PSRM / PN / PDM / AMN / BA / Indep. / ACUM / PAS / PL / PLDM / PPDA / Șor
IV 2009	60 / 11 / 15 / 15
VII 2009	48 / 13 / 7 / 15 / 18
2010	42 / 15 / 12 / 32
2014	21 / 25 / 19 / 13 / 23
2019	35 / 30 / 3 / 26 / 7
2021	32 / 63 / 6
2025	26 / 6 / 8 / 55 / 6

== Parliamentary committees ==
- Committee for Agriculture and Food Industry
  - Serghei Ivanov (PN) – Chair
  - Iurie Levinschi (PAS) – Secretary
  - Gheorghe Ichim (PAS)
  - Valeriu Robu (PAS)
  - Vera Cernega (PCRM)
  - Sergiu Stefanco (PPDA)
- Committee for Culture, Education, Research, Youth, Sport and Mass-media
  - Liliana Nicolaescu-Onofrei (PAS) – Chair
  - Virgiliu Pîslariuc (PAS) – Deputy Chair
  - Adela Răileanu (PSRM) – Deputy Chair
  - Marcela Adam (PAS) – Secretary
  - Silvia Bondarenco (PAS)
  - Maxim Potîrniche (PAS)
  - Vasile Porțevschi (PAS)
  - Ala Ursu-Antoci (PSRM)
  - Diana Caraman (PCRM)
  - Gabriela Cuneva (BA)
  - Valentina Meșină (PPDA)
- Committee for Economy, Budget and Finance
  - Dorian Istratii (PAS) – Deputy Chair
  - Olga Ursu (BA) – Deputy Chair
  - Ilie Ionaș (PAS) – Secretary
  - Radu Marian (PAS)
  - Alic Baraboi (PAS)
  - Eugeniu Sinchevici (PAS)
  - Petru Burduja (PSRM)
  - Andrei Godoroja (PCRM)
  - Constantin Cuiumju (PN)
  - Vasile Costiuc (PPDA)
- Committee for Environment, Climate and Green Transition
  - Valeriu Muduc (PSRM) – Chair
  - Sergiu Lazarencu (PAS) – Deputy Chair
  - Larisa Novac (PAS) – Secretary
  - Veronica Briceag (PAS)
  - Oleg Canațui (PAS)
  - Alla Darovannaia (PSRM)
  - Alla Pilipețcaia (PSRM)
  - Mark Tkachuk (Independent)
- Committee for European Integration
  - Adrian Băluțel (PAS) – Chair
  - Ana Calinici (PAS) – Deputy Chair
  - Olga Cebotari (PSRM) – Deputy Chair
  - Ion Babici (PAS) – Secretary
  - Tatiana Cucuietu (PAS)
  - Angela Munteanu-Pojoga (PAS)
  - Dinu Plîngău (PAS)
  - Constantin Starîș (PCRM)
  - Gaik Vartanean (BA)
  - Elena Grițco (PN)
  - Ana Țurcan-Oboroc (PPDA)
- Committee for Foreign Policy
  - Doina Gherman (PAS) – Chair
  - Ion Groza (PAS) – Deputy Chair
  - Alexandru Verșinin (PPDA) – Deputy Chair
  - Roman Roșca (PAS) – Secretary
  - Mihail Druță (PAS)
  - Igor Dodon (PSRM)
  - Ion Chicu (BA)
- Committee for Human Rights and Interethnic Relations
  - Grigore Novac (PSRM) – Chair
  - Natalia Davidovici (PAS) – Deputy Chair
  - Adrian Domentiuc (PCRM) – Secretary
  - Ana Butucea (PAS)
  - Galina Dragan (PAS)
  - Grigorii Uzun (PSRM)
- Judicial Committee for Appointments and Immunities
  - Veronica Roșca (PAS) – Chair
  - Vasile Grădinaru (PAS) – Deputy Chair
  - Igor Chiriac (PAS) – Deputy Chair
  - Pavel Voicu (PSRM) – Deputy Chair
  - Igor Talmazan (PAS) – Secretary
  - Artemie Cătănoi (PAS)
  - Alexandr Stoianoglo (BA)
  - Alexandr Berlinschii (PN)
  - Vasile Tarlev (Independent)
- Committee for National Security, Defense and Public Order
  - Lilian Carp (PAS) – Chair
  - Andrian Cheptonar (PAS) – Deputy Chair
  - Renato Usatîi (PN) – Deputy Chair
  - Stela Macari (PAS) – Secretary
  - Valeriu Carțîn (PAS)
  - Marcel Cenușa (PSRM)
  - Alexandru Chițu (PPDA)
- Committee for Public Administration and Regional Development
  - Liliana Iaconi (BA) – Chair
  - Larisa Voloh (PAS) – Deputy Chair
  - Dorin Pavaloi (PSRM) – Secretary
  - Maria Gonța (PAS)
  - Ersilia Qatrawi (PAS)
  - Efimia Bandalac (PAS)
  - Zinaida Greceanîi (PSRM)
- Committee for Public Finance Control
  - Adrian Lebedinschi (PSRM) – Chair
  - Vladimir Rusu (PAS) – Deputy Chair
  - Tatiana Rotari (PAS) – Secretary
  - Bogdan Țîrdea (PSRM)
  - Vladimir Voronin (PCRM)
- Committee for Social Protection, Health and Family
  - Adrian Belîi (PAS) – Chair
  - Marina Morozova (PAS) – Deputy Chair
  - Vladimir Odnostalco (PSRM) – Deputy Chair
  - Ludmila Adamciuc (PAS) – Secretary
  - Ana Oglinda (PAS)
  - Liliana Grosu (PAS)
  - Veronica Cupcea (PAS)
  - Vlad Batrîncea (PSRM)
  - Inga Sibova (PCRM)
  - Angela Cutasevici (BA)
  - Nicolae Margarint (PN)

Permanent Bureau

- Igor Grosu – President of the Parliament (PAS)
- Doina Gherman – Vice President of the Parliament (PAS)
- Vlad Batrîncea – Vice President of the Parliament (PSRM)
- Liliana Nicolaescu-Onofrei – PAS
- Veronica Roșca – PAS
- Lilian Carp – PAS
- Marcel Spatari – PAS
- Ion Groza – PAS
- Adrian Belîi – PAS
- Igor Dodon – PSRM
- Diana Caraman – PCRM
- Gaik Vartanean – BA
- Renato Usatîi – PN
- Vasile Costiuc – PPDA

== Presidents of the Parliament of Moldova ==
- Alexandru Moșanu (4 September 1990 – 2 February 1993)
- Petru Lucinschi (4 February 1993 – 9 January 1997)
- Dumitru Moțpan (5 March 1997 – 23 April 1998)
- Dumitru Diacov (23 April 1998 – 20 March 2001)
- Eugenia Ostapciuc (20 March 2001 – 24 March 2005)
- Marian Lupu (24 March 2005 – 5 May 2009)
- Vladimir Voronin (12 May 2009 – 28 August 2009)
- Mihai Ghimpu (28 August 2009 – 28 December 2010)
- Marian Lupu (30 December 2010 – 25 April 2013)
- Liliana Palihovici (acting; 25 April 2013 – 30 May 2013)
- Igor Corman (30 May 2013 – 9 December 2014)
- Andrian Candu (23 January 2015 – 24 February 2019)
- Zinaida Greceanîi (8 June 2019 – 29 July 2021)
- Igor Grosu (29 July 2021 – present)

== Parliament Building ==
The Parliament Building was formerly the meeting place of the Central committee of the Moldovan branch of the Communist Party of the Soviet Union, and was built between 1976 and 1979. It is located on Stephen the Great Boulevard formerly known as Lenin Boulevard. The architects were Alexander Cerdanțev and Grigore Bosenco. The building was damaged during civil unrest in 2009 and repairs were carried out in 2012 and 2013. The Parliament moved back into the restored building in February 2014.

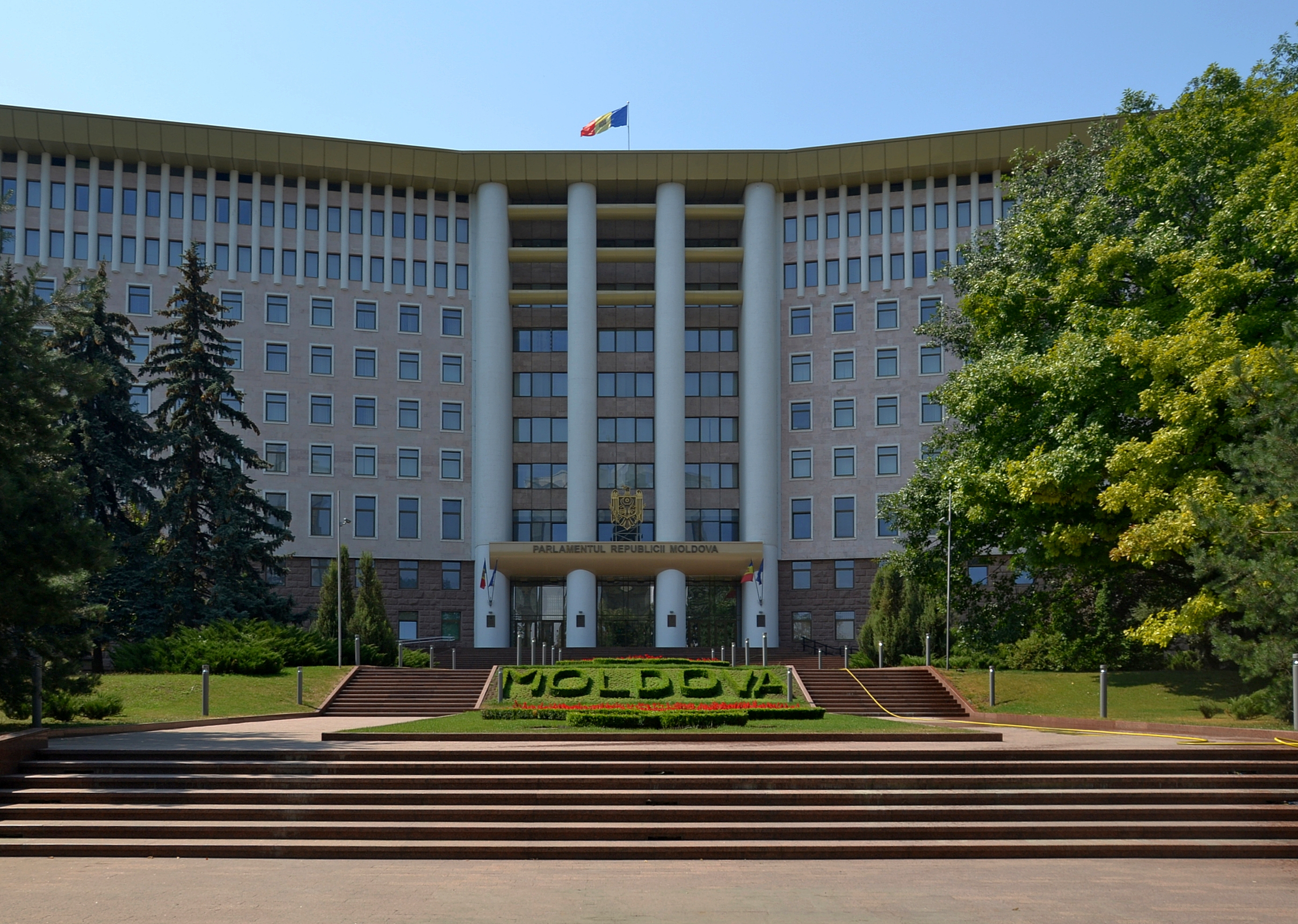
Stephen the Great Boulevard

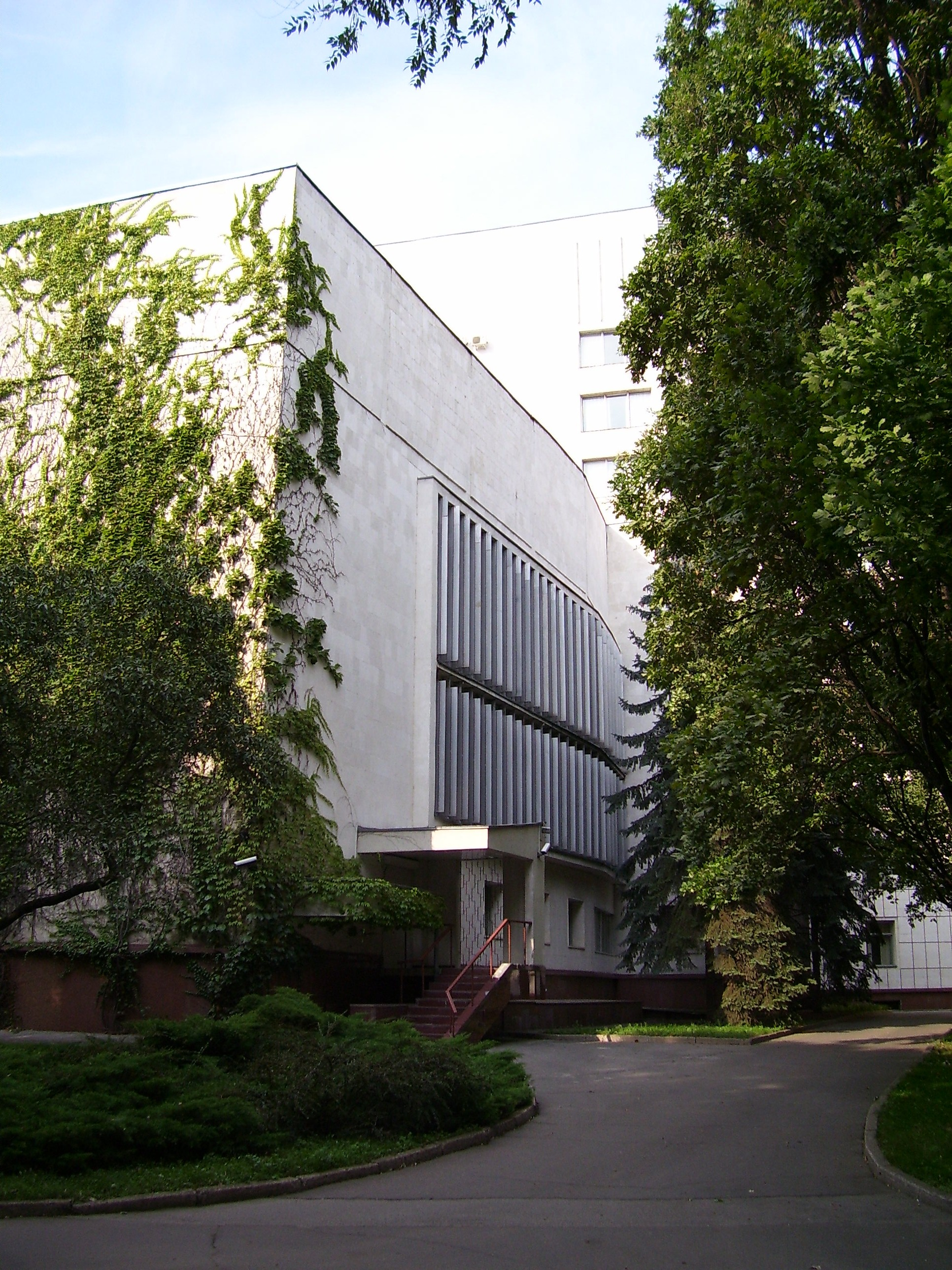
View from the rear
