= Vasile Tofan =

Prime Minister of Moldova since 2026

His Excellency Vasile Tofan
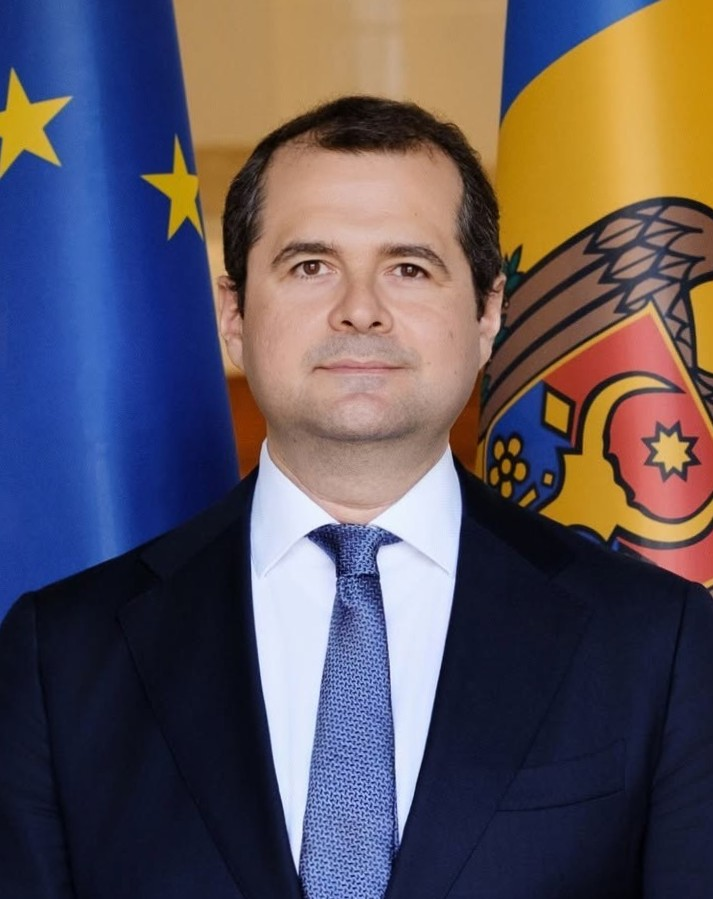
- Official portrait, 2026

18th Prime Minister of Moldova
- Incumbent
- Assumed office 22 July 2026
- President: Maia Sandu
- Deputy: Eugen Osmochescu; Mihai Popșoi; Vladimir Bolea; Cristina Gherasimov; Valeriu Chiveri
- Preceded by: Alexandru Munteanu; Eugen Osmochescu (acting)

Personal details
- Born: 12 July 1982 (age 44) Vălcineț, Moldavian SSR, Soviet Union
- Citizenship: Moldova; Romania
- Education: Erasmus University Rotterdam; Harvard Business School

Vasile Tofan (born 12 July 1982) is a Moldovan investor and businessman. He has served as Prime Minister of Moldova since 22 July 2026, having been nominated by president Maia Sandu on 11 July.

== Early life ==
Tofan was born on 12 July 1982. After completing both a bachelor's and master's degree from Erasmus University Rotterdam in public management, he worked as a consultant at Monitor Deloitte and as a senior manager at Philips in the Netherlands. He then returned to education, completing another master's degree in business administration from Harvard Business School in 2012. From 2011 until July 2026, he worked as a senior partner and member of the investment committee of the Kyiv-based company Horizon Capital.

== Early career ==
During his studies at Harvard (MBA), Vasile Tofan founded and led the development of Ovuline (a digital app for women's health). Ovuline was later rebranded as Ovia Health and was acquired by Labcorp.

== Political career ==
Tofan was nominated to be the Prime Minister of Moldova by President Maia Sandu on 11 July 2026. He was officially sworn-in to the position on 22 July, after which the Tofan Cabinet was formed.

== Personal life ==
In addition to his native Romanian, he is also fluent in Dutch which he learned while working in Rotterdam.

== See also ==
- Tofan Cabinet
- List of international prime ministerial trips made by Vasile Tofan
