= Vălcineț, Călărași =

Vălcineț
- Village
- Location within Moldova
- Coordinates: 47.2630555556°N 28.1308333333°E
- Country: Moldova
- District: Călărași District

Government
  - Mayor: Ion Sali (PAS)

Population (2014 census)
  - Total: 3,691
- Time zone: UTC+2 (EET)
  - Summer (DST): UTC+3 (EEST)

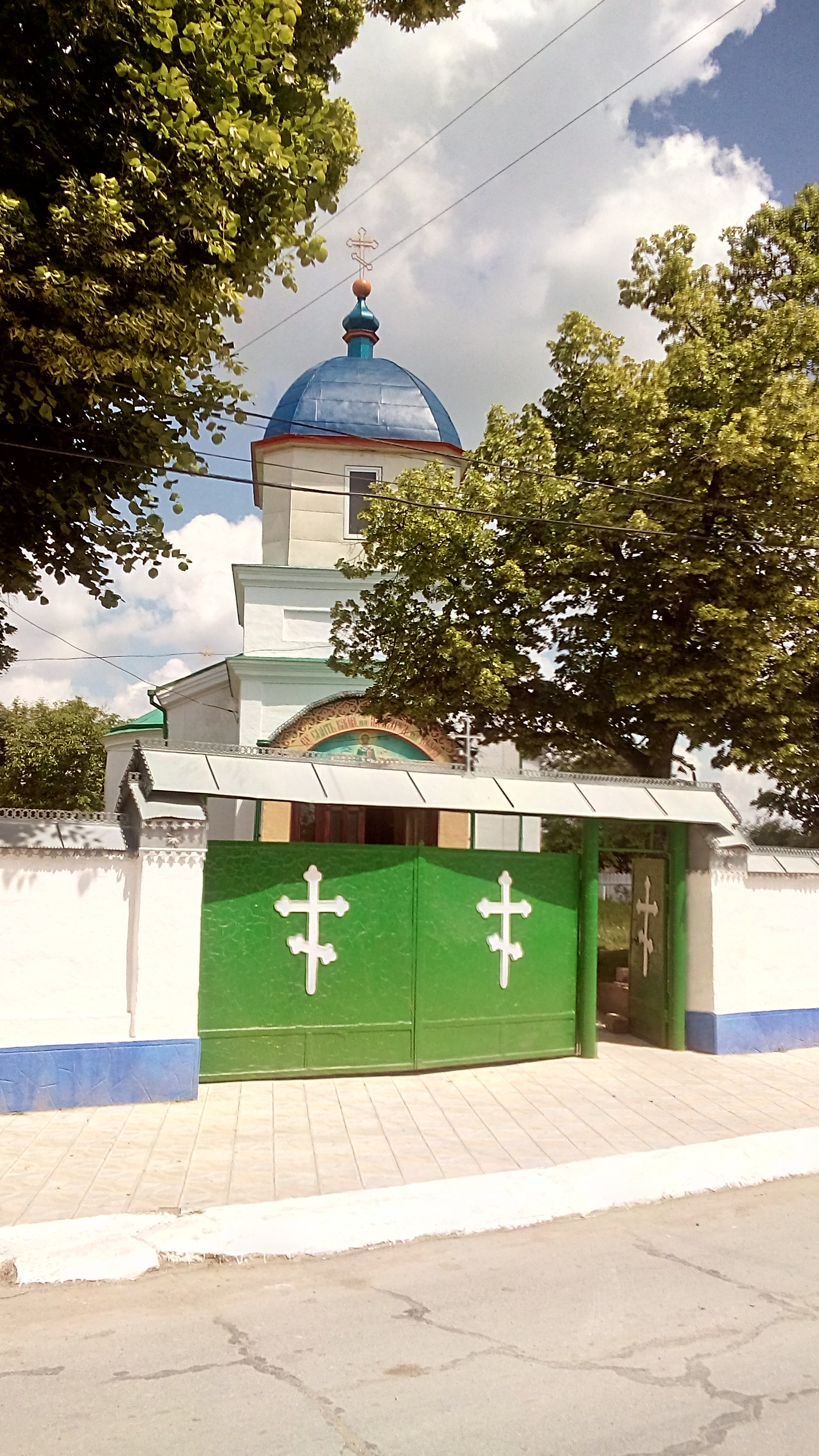
Church in Vălcineț, Călărași District (2016)

Vălcineț is a village in Călărași District, Moldova.
