= Customs Service of the Republic of Moldova =

Customs agency in Moldova

Customs Service of the Republic of Moldova Serviciul Vamal al Republicii Moldova

Agency overview
- Formed: 1991
- Preceding agency: USSR Customs Committee

Jurisdictional structure
- Operations jurisdiction: MDA
- Governing body: Government of Moldova

Operational structure
- Headquarters: Str. Nicolae Starostenco, 30, Chișinău

Website
- customs.gov.md

Customs Service of the Republic of Moldova (Romanian: Serviciul Vamal al Republicii Moldova) is an institution within the system of law enforcement and security agencies of the Republic of Moldova, with the mission of ensuring the country's economic security through collection of taxes and duties, combating customs fraud, facilitating international trade, and protecting society by applying customs legislation uniformly and impartially.

== History ==
On September 4, 1991, Presidential Decree No. 189 "On the Subordination of Customs Institutions Located on the Territory of the Republic of Moldova," came into force. The first Customs Code was adopted on March 9, 1993. Moldova joined the World Customs Organization in October 1994.
