= Radu Marian (politician) =

Moldovan politician (born 1990)

Radu Marian MP
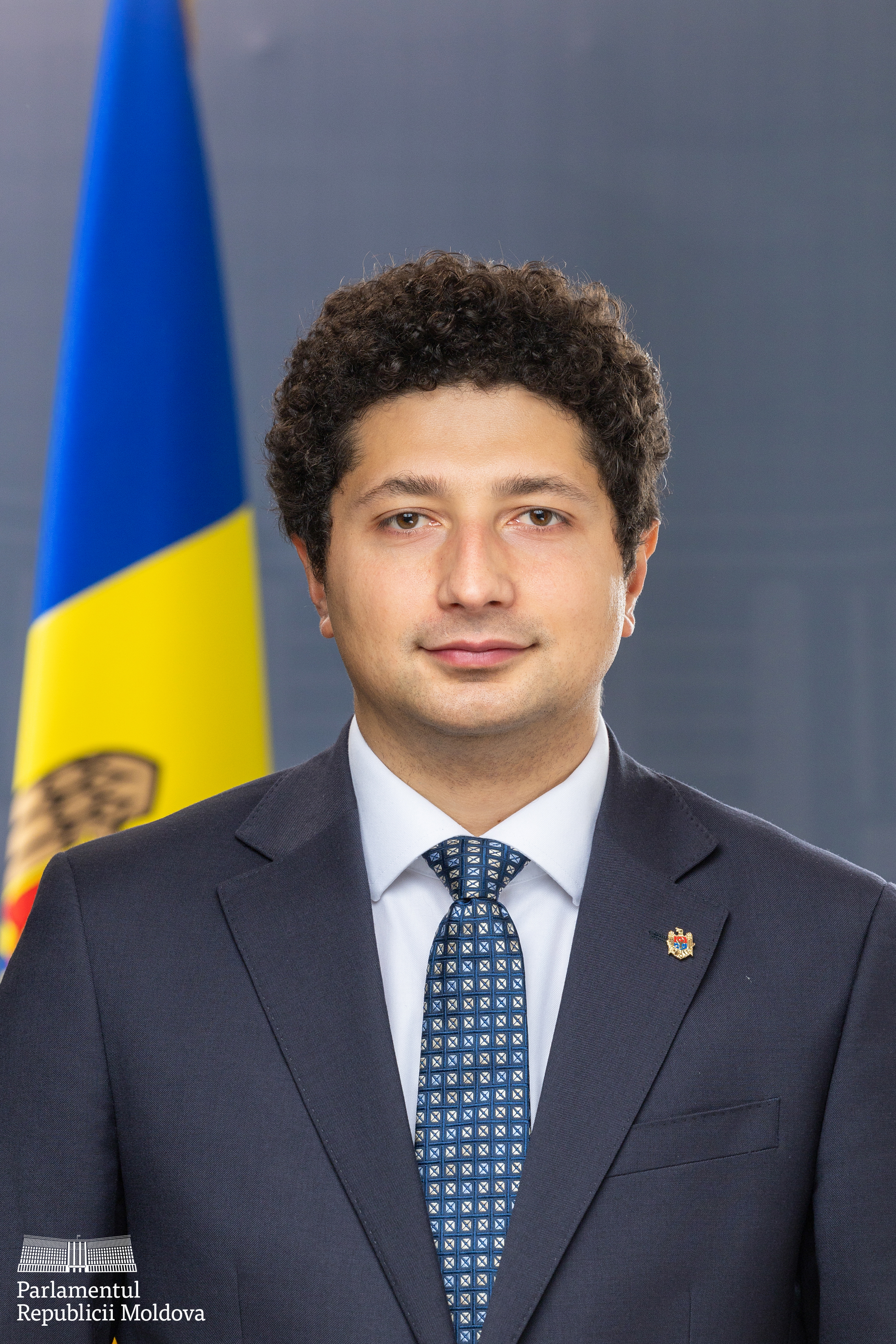
- Official portrait, 2025

Member of the Moldovan Parliament
- Incumbent
- Assumed office 9 March 2019
- Parliamentary group: Party of Action and Solidarity

Personal details
- Born: 27 December 1990 (age 35) Chișinău, SSR Moldova, Soviet Union
- Education: Academy of Economic Studies of Moldova; University of Edinburgh

Radu Marian (born 27 December 1990) is a Moldovan economist and politician. He currently serves as member of the Moldovan Parliament for PAS.
