= Alliance of the Christian Democratic Popular Front =

Electoral alliance in Moldova (1994–1998)

The Alliance of the Christian Democratic Popular Front (Romanian: Alianța Frontului Popular Creștin Democrat, AFPCD) was a political alliance in Moldova.

== History ==
The alliance was formed to contest the February 1994 elections, and consisted of the Christian Democratic Popular Front (FPCD), the Christian Democratic Youth Organisation (OTCD) and the Moldovan Volunteers' Movement (MVM). It received 8% of the vote, winning 9 of the 104 seats and becoming the fourth-largest faction in Parliament.

Prior to the 1998 elections the alliance broke up, with the FPCD joining the Democratic Convention of Moldova.
