= Alexandru Munteanu =

Prime Minister of Moldova from 2025 to 2026

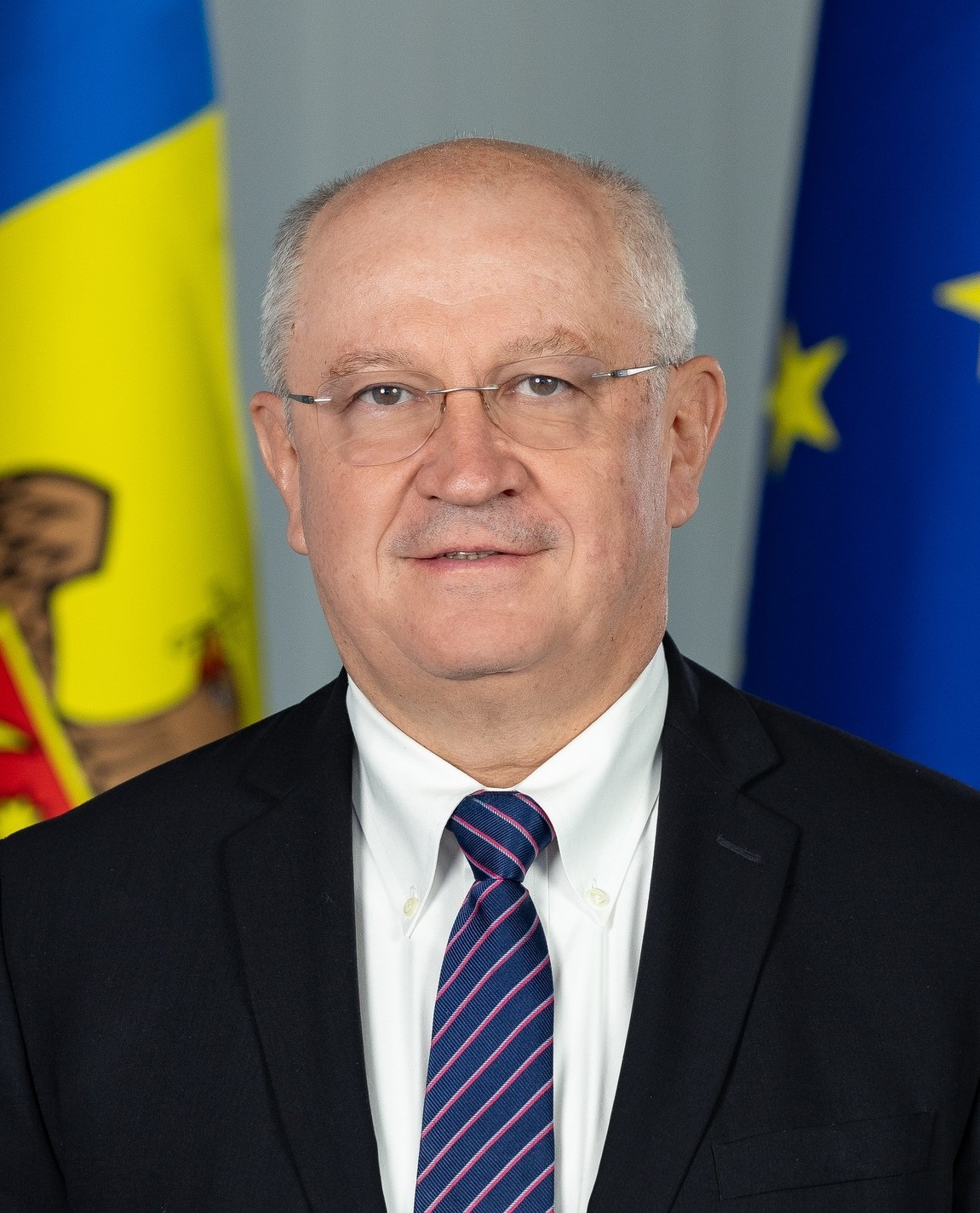
- Official portrait, 2025

17th Prime Minister of Moldova
- In office 1 November 2025 – 8 July 2026
- President: Maia Sandu
- Deputy: Mihai Popșoi; Eugen Osmochescu; Vladimir Bolea; Cristina Gherasimov; Valeriu Chiveri
- Preceded by: Dorin Recean
- Succeeded by: Eugen Osmochescu (acting)

Personal details
- Born: 20 January 1964 (age 62) Chișinău, Moldavian SSR, Soviet Union
- Citizenship: Moldova • Romania • United States
- Party: Independent
- Children: 2
- Education: Patrice Lumumba Peoples' Friendship University; Columbia University
- Awards: National Order of the Legion of Honour

Alexandru Munteanu (born 20 January 1964) is a Moldovan economist, professor and businessman who served as the prime minister of Moldova from November 2025 to July 2026.

== Early life ==
Alexandru Munteanu was born on 20 January 1964 in Chișinău, then in the Moldavian SSR in the USSR. His father was Gheorghe Munteanu, a chemist, born in the village of Cosăuți, Soroca County. He studied at the Faculty of Chemistry of the State University of Moldova from 1982 to 1997 and headed the experimental enterprise of the Institute of Chemistry of the Academy of Sciences of Moldova. His mother Adelaida Russo, a native of Bălți, was a doctor of chemistry. Munteanu's parents married in 1963. Munteanu's paternal grandfather was deported during the Soviet deportations from Bessarabia and Northern Bukovina. After several years of forced labor, he returned home seriously ill and died soon after.

Munteanu began his studies at Moscow State University, from which he graduated with a master's degree in physics, before joining Columbia University where he obtained a second master's degree in economic policy management.

== Professional career ==
An economics professional, he was employed by the National Bank of Moldova, then by Crédit Lyonnais in Paris. He worked for 10 years in Washington D.C., at the World Bank, specializing in Africa and the Middle East. He is active in investment, having founded 4i Capital Partners, an investment fund with a presence in Moldova, as well as in Ukraine and Belarus. Munteanu is also involved in binational cooperation with Moldova, having founded the American Chamber of Commerce in Moldova and co-founded the Moldovan branch of the Alliance Française (of which he remains the president). Munteanu is also the co-chair of the Business Advisory Council for South-Eastern Europe and Eurasia.

== Premiership ==
On 24 October 2025, he was appointed Prime Minister by President Maia Sandu to succeed Dorin Recean. Parliament ultimately approved his appointment. Munteanu was sworn in and announced the composition of his government on 1 November.

On 3 July 2026, Munteanu announced his resignation as the Prime Minister of Moldova, thus triggering the resignation of the whole government with him. Munteanu remained as an acting Prime Minister until 8 July 2026, when Eugen Osmochescu took his place.

== Personal life ==
Munteanu is married and has two sons: the eldest was born in the United States and the youngest in Moldova. In 2025, he reported that both sons lived and worked in the United States. He is also a citizen of Romania and the United States. He is fluent in Romanian, Russian, English, and French.

== Awards and distinctions ==
- Knight of the Legion of Honour (2006)

== See also ==
- Munteanu Cabinet
- List of international prime ministerial trips made by Alexandru Munteanu
