= Party of Action and Solidarity =

Pro-European political party in Moldova

Party of Action and Solidarity Partidul Acțiune și Solidaritate
- Abbreviation: PAS
- Leader: Igor Grosu
- Secretary-General: Andrei Rusanovschi
- Parliamentary group leader: Doina Gherman
- Founder: Maia Sandu
- Founded: 15 May 2016; 10 years ago
- Headquarters: 9/1 Maria Cebotari Street, Chișinău
- Youth wing: PAS Youth
- Membership (2025): 15,301
- Ideology: Liberalism (Moldovan); Pro-Europeanism
- Political position: Centre-right
- European affiliation: European People's Party (associate)
- International affiliation: International Democracy Union
- Colours: Yellow Black
- Slogan: E vremea oamenilor buni ('It is the time of the good people')
- Parliament: 55 / 101 (54%)
- District Presidents: 18 / 32 (56%)
- Mayors: 291 / 898 (32%)

Party flag

Website
- www.unpaspentru.md

The Party of Action and Solidarity (Romanian: Partidul Acțiune și Solidaritate, PAS) is a pro-European political party in Moldova. The PAS was founded by Maia Sandu, the former Minister of Education and the incumbent president of Moldova. It is an observer of the European People's Party (EPP) and the International Democracy Union (IDU).

== History ==
=== Formation ===
The party was created amid the 2015–2016 protests in Moldova and growing popular dissatisfaction with the ruling parties. On 23 December 2015, Maia Sandu posted a YouTube video in which she announced her intention to form a new political party. Her stated reason for doing so was the creation of a grassroots party, that would function based on the principles of internal democracy and would be financed through small donations. Sandu was elected as leader of the PAS on 15 May 2016 and the party was officially registered by the Ministry of Justice on 26 May. At the time of registration, the party had 7,500 members and 20 local organizations. In February 2017, the party applied for membership of the European People's Party (EPP).

=== In coalition government: June 2019 – November 2019 ===
In the 2019 Moldovan parliamentary election, the PAS and the Dignity and Truth Platform Party formed the NOW Platform electoral alliance, which gathered 26.8% of the votes. After the alliance split into two separate parliamentary groups, the PAS ended up with 15 seats. On 6 June, the Party announced that it was ready to form a coalition government with the pro-Russian Party of Socialists of the Republic of Moldova (PSRM) with the goal of freeing state institutions, which in their opinion were under oligarchic control. After the coalition was formed, PSRM leader Zinaida Greceanîi was elected as Speaker of the Parliament and the Sandu Cabinet was inaugurated. Largely because of the significant ideological differences between the ruling parties, the government only lasted for five months and was ousted on 12 November after the PSRM and the Democratic Party of Moldova voted in favor of a motion of no confidence.

=== In opposition: November 2019 – July 2021 ===
After the ousting of the Sandu cabinet, the PAS was in opposition. In the 2020 Moldovan presidential election, the party's candidate and leader Sandu was elected as President of Moldova. According to Moldovan law, the president cannot be a member of a political party which resulted in Sandu resigning from the office of party president and renouncing her party membership. Until the next party congress, the post of PAS president was held by first vice president Igor Grosu on an interim basis, who was subsequently elected as the next PAS president.

=== In majority government: July 2021 – present ===
The PAS won by a landslide during the 2021 Moldovan parliamentary election, earning them 63 seats in the parliament. Igor Grosu was elected the President of the Moldovan Parliament. On 6 August 2021, Natalia Gavrilița was voted by 61 MPs as the Prime Minister of Moldova and she became the second PAS Prime Minister of Moldova, after Maia Sandu (2019). In early 2022, the party will hold a leadership election and is also expected to nominate a candidate for the 2023 Chișinău mayoral elections. In December 2023, the PAS joined forces with PSRM to secure a two-thirds majority for dismissing Octavian Armașu as governor of the National Bank of Moldova. The dismissal was criticised by the European Commission and International Monetary Fund.

Elections in Moldova have played a decisive role in shaping the country’s geopolitical direction, often seen as a crossroads between pro-European reform and closer ties with Russia. The 2021 parliamentary election was particularly significant, marking a major shift toward European integration as PAS secured a commanding majority. The 2025 election further reinforced this trajectory; even though the number of parliamentary seats had been reduced, PAS managed to retain its majority, underscoring continued public support for institutional reforms, anti-corruption efforts, and closer cooperation with the European Union. These elections not only redefined Moldova’s domestic political landscape but also drew international attention due to their implications for regional stability in Eastern Europe.

== Political positions ==
The PAS has been widely described as a pro-European, pro-Western, centrist, centre-right, and right-wing party that adheres to liberalism, conservative liberalism, and liberal conservatism. The 2016 party program claims that they adhere to social liberalism. Italian scholar Gian Marco Moisé described the party as populist.

=== Social policy ===
The PAS has pursued policies deemed to be "culturally European" with examples including the signing of the anti-domestic abuse Istanbul Convention. This has received criticism about "western elites-based genderism" from Moldova's left. It has also been described as progressive and culturally liberal.

=== Economic policies ===
According to its program, the PAS supports the idea of an economy "based on private initiative" and is in favor of a "significant reduction of bureaucracy in all stages of business". In the 2020 Moldovan presidential election campaign, the party's candidate Maia Sandu proposed raising the minimum wage to 2,000 lei (around 114 US dollars).

=== Foreign policy ===
A member of the European People's Party (EPP), the PAS supports membership of Moldova in the European Union, establishing a strategic partnership with the United States and the further west, and maintaining a normal and non-confrontational relationship with Russia. The party supports strengthening Moldova's relationship with Romania but does not explicitly endorse the unification of Moldova and Romania.

According to Moldovan diplomat Mihai Gribincea, PAS promoted a "civic Moldovan nation" not adhering to Soviet-era Moldovenism and its anti-Romanian framing but neither to explicit unionism with Romania and to a national historical narrative coherently Romanian. This would have aimed to produce a balanced neutral identitary discourse to replace old ethnolinguistic and geopolitical conflicts and avoid fractures in the electorate and allow the formation of a broad civic front capable of supporting a pro-European agenda. A similar opinion was argued by the writer and journalist Nicolae Negru, who said in 2018 that PAS and the Dignity and Truth Platform have a duplicitous attitude towards Romania: on the one hand, they support closer relations with Romania, but, on the other hand, they promote the statalism and "the civic Moldovan nation". In 2025, the opposition Moldovan National Party accused PAS, that although it promoted the introduction of the Romanian language as the official language into the Constitution of the Republic of Moldova in 2023, it did not implement this law in order to promote the idea of "the civic Moldovan union" and not an explicitly Romanian identity of Moldovans. A similar opinion was expressed by the Romanian sociologist and geopolitician Dan Dungaciu in 2016:

The underlying theme of the anti-corruption battle was the idea of a “civic Moldovan nation.” THIS is the reason why so many people gathered around the DA Platform and, later, around Maia Sandu. For many Moldovan intellectuals, “anti-corruption” became the false conscience of a so-called “civic Moldovan patriotism.”

This also explains why, within the DA Platform and later in Maia Sandu’s inner circle, we could find former advisers of Mircea Snegur — people who, back in June 1994, were encouraging him to sponsor the insidious congress “Our Home – Republic of Moldova”, the first explicit and well-articulated project of Moldovan identity after the fall of the USSR. In 1994, Moldovenism effectively became a state project. This explains why the DA Platform, and later Maia Sandu, rejected any Romanian identity formulas: because they already had one! It was the idea of a “civic Moldovan nation” (different from the “ethnic Moldovan nation” of Snegur or Voronin). This concept claims to transcend ethnicity and focus solely on “unity”: it rejects anything that could fragment the monolithic unity of the republic — whether geopolitics, appeals to Romania, or appeals to Russia. Instead, it seeks to unite everyone — Romanians, Moldovans, Russians, Ukrainians, Gagauz, Bulgarians, Jews, and others—into the “civic Moldovan nation” and to mobilize them in the fight against corruption. Anti-corruption becomes, in effect, a mechanism of nation-building. Still, there is nothing truly new under the sun. This is merely another episode—in fact, a project that died before it was fully born—in the long saga of attempts to define the republic in non-Romanian terms: from the ethnic Moldovanism of Mircea Snegur (*“Our Home – Republic of Moldova”*) and Vladimir Voronin’s 2003 National Conception, to Vlad Filat’s slippery notion of “European Moldovanism,” and, more recently, the identity projects of Marian Lupu and the Democratic Party.

Today, in the case of Maia Sandu and her supporters, what we are dealing with is the project of a “civic Moldovan nation.”

In 2021, when asked how she views the rise of the pro-union movement in the Republic of Moldova, given that the most recent poll showed that around 44% of Moldovans would like unification with Romania, Moldovan President Maia Sandu, founder of the Action and Solidarity Party (PAS), stated:

We know that there is a large number of people who support the idea of unification. At the same time, there is another part of society that is fearful of this idea. A major project like this can only be undertaken with sufficient majority support. We will follow the polls to see how things develop. Meanwhile, we are building relations with Romania. Beyond speeches, we are building bridges—projects that unite us in the energy, cultural, and educational fields.

When asked whether it would be enough for 50% plus one to support unification, Maia Sandu replied that "more than that is needed, as such a project must be supported by an overwhelming majority of citizens." Furthermore, Maia Sandu implied that she is not advocating for an unification with Romania, but rather for closer ties within the framework of the European Union: "Romania is waiting for us in the European Union," Maia Sandu concluded.

== Leadership ==
Has been serving as the President of Moldova and also served as Prime Minister of Moldova
Also served as the President of the Moldovan Parliament

No.	Name	Image	Term start	Term end	Term length
1	Maia Sandu		15 May 2016	10 December 2020	4 years, 6 months and 25 days
2	Igor Grosu		15 May 2022	Incumbent	4 years, 5 months and 12 days

=== Current leadership positions ===
- Igor Grosu – President; President of the Parliament
- Andrei Rusanovschi – Secretary General
- Mihai Popșoi – Vice President; Deputy Prime Minister, Minister of Foreign Affairs
- Vladimir Bolea – Vice President; Deputy Prime Minister, Minister of Infrastructure and Regional Development
- Dan Perciun – Vice President; Minister of Education and Research
- Gheorghe Hajder – Vice President; Minister of Environment
- Doina Gherman – Vice President; Vice President of the Parliament
- Liliana Nicolaescu-Onofrei – Vice President; MP
- Radu Marian – Vice President; MP
- Veronica Roșca – Vice President; MP
- Lilian Carp – Vice President; MP
- Larisa Voloh – Vice President; MP
- Adrian Băluțel – Vice President; MP
- Igor Chiriac – Vice President; MP
- Virgiliu Pîslariuc – Vice President; MP
- Tatiana Cucuietu – Vice President; MP
- Ion Groza – Vice President; MP

== Election results ==
=== Parliament ===
Election	Leader	Performance					Rank	Government
Election	Leader	Votes	%	± pp	Seats	+/–	Rank	Government
2019	Maia Sandu	380,181	26.84% (ACUM) (Note: NOW Platform DA and PAS won 26 seats of which 15 went to the PAS and 11 to the PPDA.)	New	15 / 101	New	3rd	Coalition (ACUM (PAS–PPDA)–PSRM) majority government (2019)
2019	Maia Sandu	380,181	26.84% (ACUM)	New	15 / 101	New	3rd	Opposition to PSRM–PDM government (2019–2021)
2021	Igor Grosu	774,754	52.80%	▲25.96	63 / 101	▲48	1st	Majority government Gavrilița Cabinet (2021–2023); Recean Cabinet (2023–2025)
2025	Igor Grosu	792,557	50.20%	▼2.60	55 / 101	▼8	1st	Majority government Munteanu Cabinet (2025–2026); Tofan Cabinet (2026–present)

=== President of Moldova ===
Election	Candidate	First round		Second round		Result
Election	Candidate	Votes	%	Votes	%	Result
2016	Maia Sandu	549,152	38.71%	766,593	47.89%	Lost ✗
2020	Maia Sandu	487,635	36.16%	943,006	57.72%	Elected ✓
2024	Supported Maia Sandu (Note: The President of Moldova traditionally resigns from party membership after taking office. Although Sandu was officially an independent candidate, her campaign was endorsed, supported, and funded by the Party of Action and Solidarity (PAS).)	656,852	42.49%	930,139	55.35%	Elected ✓

=== Chișinău mayoral elections ===
Election	Leader	Candidate	First round		Second round		Result
Election	Leader	Candidate	Votes	%	Votes	%	Result
2018	Maia Sandu	Andrei Năstase (ACUM)	71,803	32.12	129,432	52.57	Elected ✓
2019	Maia Sandu	Andrei Năstase (ACUM)	70,056	31.08	112,514	47.61	Lost ✗
2023	Igor Grosu	Lilian Carp	74,074	28.23	—N/a	—N/a	Lost ✗

=== Chișinău Municipal Council elections ===
Election	Leader	Votes		Seats	Position
Election	Leader	Votes	%	No.	Position
2019	Maia Sandu	74,255	33.30	19 / 51 (ACUM)	2nd
2023	Igor Grosu	84,615	32.88	20 / 51	2nd

=== Local elections ===
==== Mayors ====
Election year	Mayors	% of overall mayor mandates	No. of overall mandates won	+/–
2023	291	32.51	291 / 898	

=== President of Romania ===
Election	Candidate	First round		Second round		Result
Election	Candidate	Votes	%	Votes	%	Result
2025	Supported Crin Antonescu	1,892,930	20.07%	Not qualified		Lost ✗
2025	Supported Nicușor Dan	Not endorsed		6,168,642	53.60%	Elected ✓
