= Igor Dodon =

President of Moldova from 2016 to 2020

Igor Dodon MP
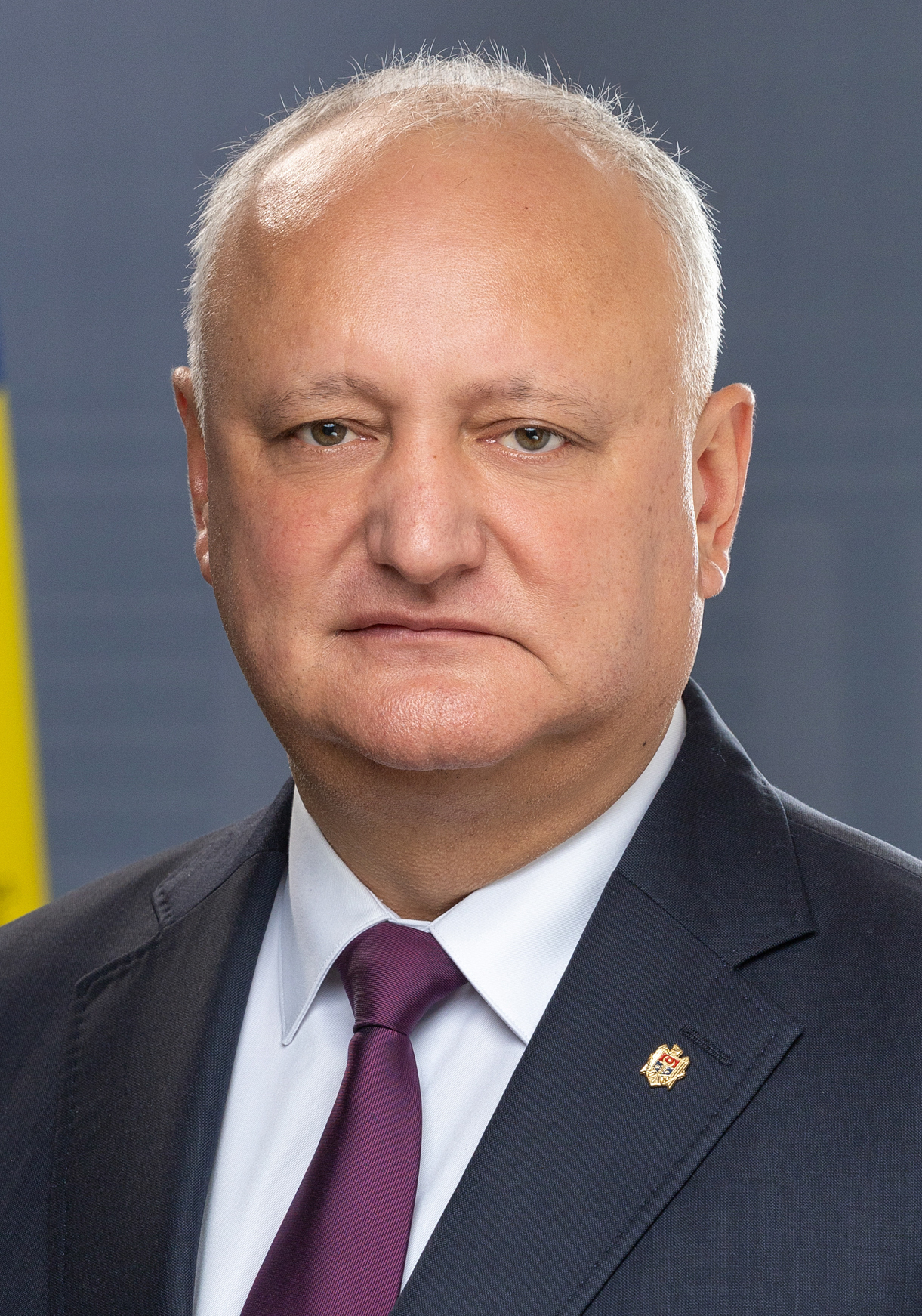
- Official portrait, 2025

Member of the Moldovan Parliament
- Incumbent
- Assumed office 22 October 2025
- Parliamentary group: Party of Socialists
- In office 23 July 2021 – 28 October 2021
- Succeeded by: Adrian Lebedinschi
- Parliamentary group: Bloc of Communists and Socialists
- In office 14 August 2009 – 15 December 2016
- Succeeded by: Irina Mizdrenco
- Parliamentary group: Party of Communists; Party of Socialists

President of the Party of Socialists
- Incumbent
- Assumed office 23 March 2024
- Preceded by: Himself (as Executive Secretary)
- In office 30 December 2020 – 18 December 2021
- Preceded by: Zinaida Greceanîi
- Succeeded by: Vlad Batrîncea (as Executive Secretary)
- In office 18 December 2011 – 18 December 2016
- Preceded by: Veronica Abramciuc; Eduard Smirnov
- Succeeded by: Zinaida Greceanîi

5th President of Moldova
- In office 23 December 2016 – 24 December 2020
- Prime Minister: Pavel Filip; Maia Sandu; Ion Chicu
- Preceded by: Nicolae Timofti
- Succeeded by: Maia Sandu

First Deputy Prime Minister of Moldova
- In office 31 March 2008 – 14 September 2009
- President: Vladimir Voronin; Mihai Ghimpu (acting)
- Prime Minister: Zinaida Greceanîi
- Preceded by: Zinaida Greceanîi

Minister of Economy and Trade
- In office 18 September 2006 – 14 September 2009
- President: Vladimir Voronin; Mihai Ghimpu (acting)
- Prime Minister: Vasile Tarlev; Zinaida Greceanîi
- Preceded by: Valeriu Lazăr
- Succeeded by: Valeriu Lazăr (as Minister of Economy)

Deputy Minister of Economy and Trade
- In office 18 May 2005 – 18 September 2006
- President: Vladimir Voronin
- Prime Minister: Vasile Tarlev
- Minister: Valeriu Lazăr
- Succeeded by: Viorel Melnic

Personal details
- Born: 18 February 1975 (age 51) Sadova, Călărași, Moldavian SSR, Soviet Union
- Citizenship: Moldova; Russia
- Party: PSRM (2011–2016, since 2020)
- Other political affiliations: PCRM (2010–2011)
- Spouse: Galina Dodon (m. 1999)
- Children: 3
- Education: State Agrarian University of Moldova; Academy of Economic Studies of Moldova; IMI-NOVA International Management Institute
- Awards: Order of Work Glory; Knight of the Equestrian Order of the Holy Sepulchre of Jerusalem
- Website: Official website
- Igor Dodon's voice Dodon on his opposition to the EU-Association Agreement with Moldova and his support on enhancing relations with the Eurasian Economic Union during a press conference with President Vladimir Putin; Recorded 17 January 2017

Igor Dodon (Romanian: [ˈiɡor doˈdon]; born 18 February 1975) is a Moldovan economist and politician who served as the 5th president of Moldova from 2016 to 2020. He currently serves as the leader of the Party of Socialists of the Republic of Moldova since 2024. He served as Minister of Economy and Trade in the governments of Vasile Tarlev and Zinaida Greceanîi from September 2006 to September 2009 and was a member of the Parliament of Moldova from 2009 to 2016. He lost his bid for re-election in 2020 to Maia Sandu, whom he had defeated four years earlier in the 2016 Moldovan presidential election.

On 24 May 2022, Dodon was arrested by the Moldovan authorities on charges of passive corruption, illegal financing of a political party by a criminal organization, illicit enrichment, and high treason against Moldova through receiving funds from fugitive Moldovan politician Vladimir Plahotniuc in order to intercede on Plahotniuc's behalf regarding criminal cases filed in Russia. He was placed under house arrest on 26 May in order to allow prosecutors to investigate the allegations further. The United States Department of the Treasury has also accused Dodon of corruption and conspiring with Russia through his political aides to interfere with the Moldovan elections and rig the media in his favour. He was released from house arrest on 18 November 2022 pending a court trial on all charges.

== Early and personal life ==
Igor Dodon was born on 18 February 1975 in Sadova village in the Călărași District of the Moldavian Soviet Socialist Republic (now Moldova) to Nicolae (died 2012) and Galina Dodon, a Romanian language teacher in his native village.

=== Studies and didactic activity ===
He graduated from the Faculty of Economics at the State Agrarian University of Moldova in 1997, then the Faculty of Management at the Academy of Economic Studies of Moldova in 1998. He later graduated from the Faculty of Law in economics at the International Management Institute. He obtained the scientific title of Doctor in Economic Sciences at the Academy of Economic Studies of Moldova, the Department of Banks and Stock Exchanges. From 1997 to 2005, Dodon also carried out pedagogical activities. This is where he would meet his wife Galina in May 1995. Thus, he holds the positions of assistant lecturer at the Academy of Economic Studies of Moldova (Banks and Stock Exchanges Department), senior lecturer at the Free International University of Moldova (Banks and Stock Exchanges Department), the International Institute of Management (Finance Department) and the State University of Moldova. Igor Dodon is also a member Examination Committees at the university graduation exams within ULIM and IIM.

== Professional career ==
After graduating from educational institutions, since July 1997 Igor Dodon has been employed at the Moldova Stock Exchange. Thus, between 1997 and 2001 he worked as a senior specialist of the Clearing Department, of the Listing Department, administrator of the Electronic Trading Systems and then, Director of the Marketing, Listing Department within the Moldova Stock Exchange. Between November 2001 and May 2005, he served as chairman and member of the Board of Directors of the National Depository of Securities of Moldova SA. From September 2002 to May 2005 he was the chairman of the Universal Commodity Exchange of Moldova. Between February 2003 – May 2005, Igor Dodon is a member of the expert committee to the National Securities Commission of Moldova. Also, between March 2004 – May 2005, he is also a member of the Arbitration Commission of the Stock Exchange. He was an editor of the Newsletter "Stock Exchange of Moldova" and of the Stock Market Bulletin of the Universal Commodities Exchange "Stock Exchange – Stock market quotations".

== Political career ==
Dodon was appointed to the post of Associate Minister of Trade and Economics in May 2005, during the second Tarlev Cabinet. He assumed the position of Minister of Trade and Economics in September 2006. He held the position until September 2009, when the government of Zinaida Greceanîi ended. Dodon also held the post of Associate Prime Minister under Greceanîi from 2008 until 2009.

In 2005, the PCRM also had won the elections having an open pro-European platform, with a pro-European slogan "I Vote", where the European stars surrendered the hammer and sickle on the red Communist wallpaper.

In 2007, a trend for all political forces was to adopt a pro-European platform for the elections in 2009. In this regard, Igor Dodon, during his work trips to Brussels, had assured the high rank European officials on how he and an entire Communist party were pro-European.

In September 2009, after 8 years of governing, the Communist Party came into opposition. Igor Dodon had lost his ministerial position. He became an MP in the Parliament, which was reelected in November 2010. He had the 6th position in the PCRM list of the candidates. The Communists has changed the European vector, and in 2010 they drifted to east, and self-declared as pro-Russians.

Igor Dodon, in only a year, since 2009 by 2010, became a convinced pro Moldovan – no Europe, neither Russia. "Moldova can become a contact point for different countries; an area where first of all will interfere the economic interests of our neighbors and partners. We are in a very advantageous position in terms of the common interest of CIS and EU and this objective shall become an issue of the external policy."

In June 2011, Dodon lost to Dorin Chirtoacă at the elections for mayor of Chișinău. He took 49.4% of the votes. The local elections have been an occasion for the Communist Party to return to power, at the least at the local authority level. During the election campaign, Igor Dodon went to Brussels where he had meetings with the European officials in order to establish the potential partnerships: "I am at the working trip in Brussels, where I have several meetings in my agenda, including with the Mayors of some big towns of Belgium, with the acting Prime Minister of Belgium and some high rank officials of the European Commission".

Inside the PCRM, an internal fight had existed between Igor Dodon and Mark Tkaciuk. Dodon has had some separate opinion on some policy issues. This independence had raised some fears from the Tkaciuk side, and Dodon was considered a social threat. Dodon has shown that he had an internal support, from some rayon committees of the party. An independent position of Igor Dodon, his rating within the party and in the society, his political ambitions in overtaking the power, first of the Mayor Office and then, in PCRM – all this were interpreted by Tkaciuk as a threat, the fact that made him to speed up and force the actions that led to marginalization of Dodon in PCRM, by misinforming methods in order to prevent him to be delegated at the position of the Mayor of the Capital.

In November 2011, Dodon left the Party of Communists of the Republic of Moldova (PCRM) citing hopes that a deal could be worked out with the ruling Alliance for European Integration to elect a president and end a constitutional crisis that had dragged on since the resignation of Vladimir Voronin in 2009. Greceanîi and Veronica Abramciuc left at the same time. "Our decision has a common and complex goal: to avoid early elections, the elections of the president of the country, reshaping of the government and political and social stability. This is the society wish, and this is what the Republic of Moldova is needed – a stability and the economic development once and for all... We left the PCRM in order to cut the 'Gordian knot' of the hate and distrust which for the last two years made impossible any constitutional decision needed for the Republic of Moldova stability" Igor Dodon has declared.

On 18 December 2011, Dodon joined the Party of Socialists of the Republic of Moldova (PSRM) and, at the Xth Congress of PSRM, he was elected chairman of the party.

On 16 March 2012, three former communists (Dodon, Greceanîi and Abramciuc) voted for the Alliance for European Integration (AIE) candidate Nicolae Timofti as president of Moldova. Later, Dodon stated that he regretted his vote for Timofti.

After he was elected as the president of Moldova, due to specifics of Moldovan law, Dodon resigned as PSRM chairman and left the party, being replaced by Zinaida Greceanîi as interim leader.

== Presidency ==
- Presidency of Igor Dodon; 23 December 2016 – 24 December 2020
- President: Igor Dodon
- Prime Minister: Pavel Filip Maia Sandu Ion Chicu
- Cabinet: Filip Cabinet Sandu Cabinet Chicu Cabinet
- Party: Party of Socialists
- Election: 2016
- Seat: Presidential Palace 164 Stephen the Great Boulevard, Chișinău

Dodon was sworn in on 23 December 2016 in the Palace of the Republic. Three days later, the flag of Europe that had flown next to the Moldovan flag from the building of the Moldovan presidential administration was removed. On 4 January 2017, Dodon met with the president of the breakaway republic of Transnistria Vadim Krasnoselsky. This meeting was the first meeting of the leaders of Moldova and Transnistria in 8 years. In October 2017, Dodon signed a law that provides for the reform of the Academy of Sciences of Moldova.

After being elected president, in an interview with Deutsche Welle, Dodon said:

"I believe that we have many problems that need to be addressed together with Russia, this is true. But at the same time, I am not a pro-Russian, not pro-Western, but a pro-Moldavian politician, a supporter of our statehood. I believe that the most important thing is to respect the interests of our own country. My "pro-Russian, is a cliche that my political opponents are trying to introduce into the consciousness of citizens."

In 2018, Belarusian President Alexander Lukashenko was the first foreign head of state to meet Dodon in Moldova. Dodon has also acted to make the Russian language mandatory in Moldovan schools.

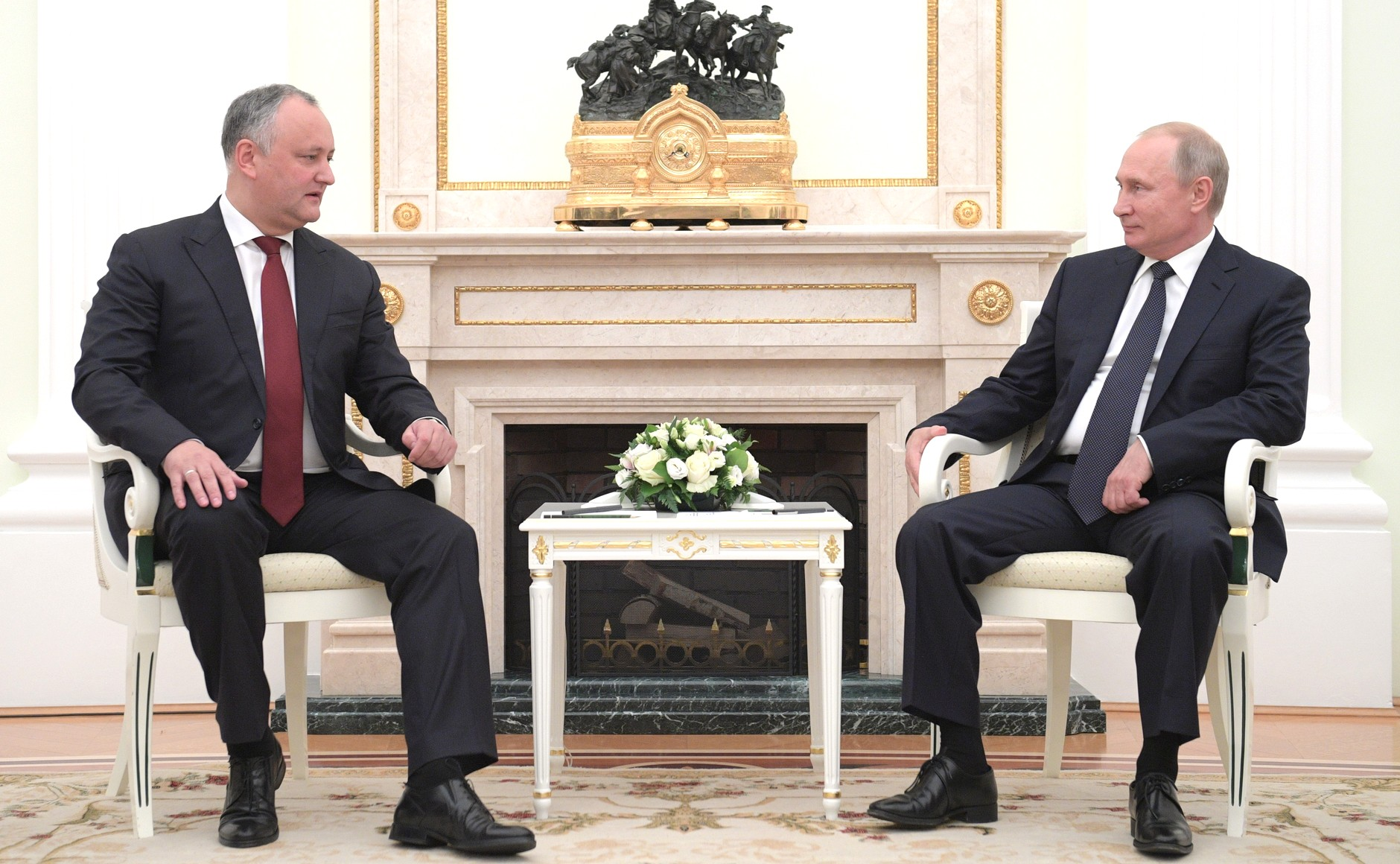
Igor Dodon and Vladimir Putin, 2018

On 5 May 2018, Dodon announced a campaign, which would bring legislation into parliament, which would transition Moldova from a parliamentary republic to a presidential republic. According to polls carried out in 2019 on the topic of respect for politicians of the Republic of Moldova, Igor Dodon enjoyed the highest trust, ranking first among politicians in which Moldovans. In the early years of his presidency, steps were taken to renovate the Presidential Palace in Condrița with the help of the Turkish government. Some of the renovations included a play ground for Dodon's young children and a wine cellar. The renovated palace was opened on 17 October 2018 by Dodon and Turkish president Recep Tayyip Erdogan.

On 16 October 2018, Dodon declared that his country would be prepared to host a Pan-Orthodox Council, where the situation with the Ukraine autocephaly and the Moscow–Constantinople schism should be discussed. He also said that "Moldova will remain a canonical territory of the Moscow Patriarchate." He strongly opposed the pro-Romanian Metropolis of Bessarabia. In early 2019, President Dodon ordered a National Coordination Committee to plan national events and celebrations dedicated to the 75th anniversary of the Liberation of Moldova in the Second Jassy–Kishinev Offensive. The events would include the restoration or reconstruction of monuments and military graves and the filming of a documentary on the offensive. At the same time, Dodon presided over the celebrations of the 660th anniversary of Moldovan statehood in early February.

During the 2019 Moldovan constitutional crisis, Dodon was temporarily relieved of the powers and duties of the presidency by a Moldovan court because of the reluctance to dissolve the parliament as mandated by the Constitutional Court of Moldova in a previous ruling and replaced by the former prime minister Pavel Filip as the acting president of the country.

In late October, he met with Transnistrian President Krasnoselsky at his residence in Holercani ahead of the Bavaria Conference, scheduled for 4–5 November.

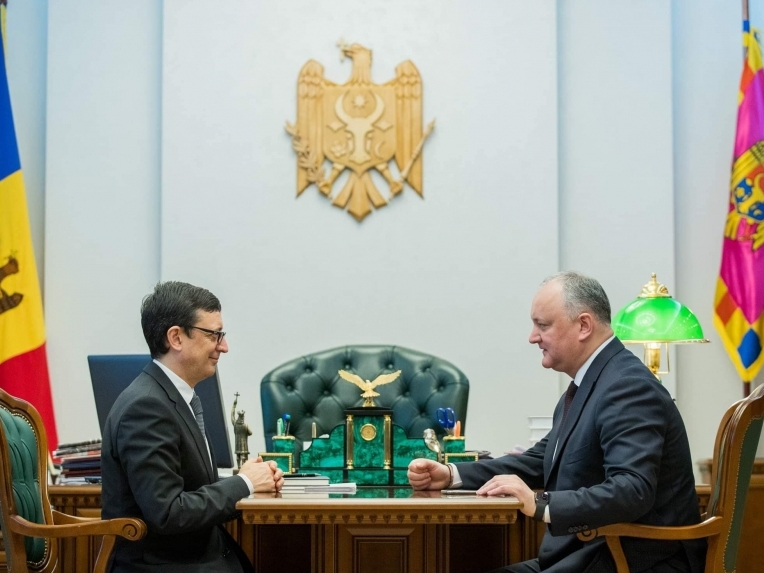
Dodon with NBM governor Octavian Armașu, 19 February 2020

In 2020, he ordered the creation of a National Heraldic Commission that would look into the concept of awarding medals to war veterans in honor of the 75th anniversary of the end of World War II. On 15 April, he ordered the postponement of the Victory Day celebrations to 24 August (Liberation Day) due to the coronavirus pandemic in Moldova.

Dodon announced his candidacy for another term on 9 September, saying he is doing it "on behalf of the people". In his campaign message, he pledged to dissolve the parliament after the elections.

=== Suspensions ===
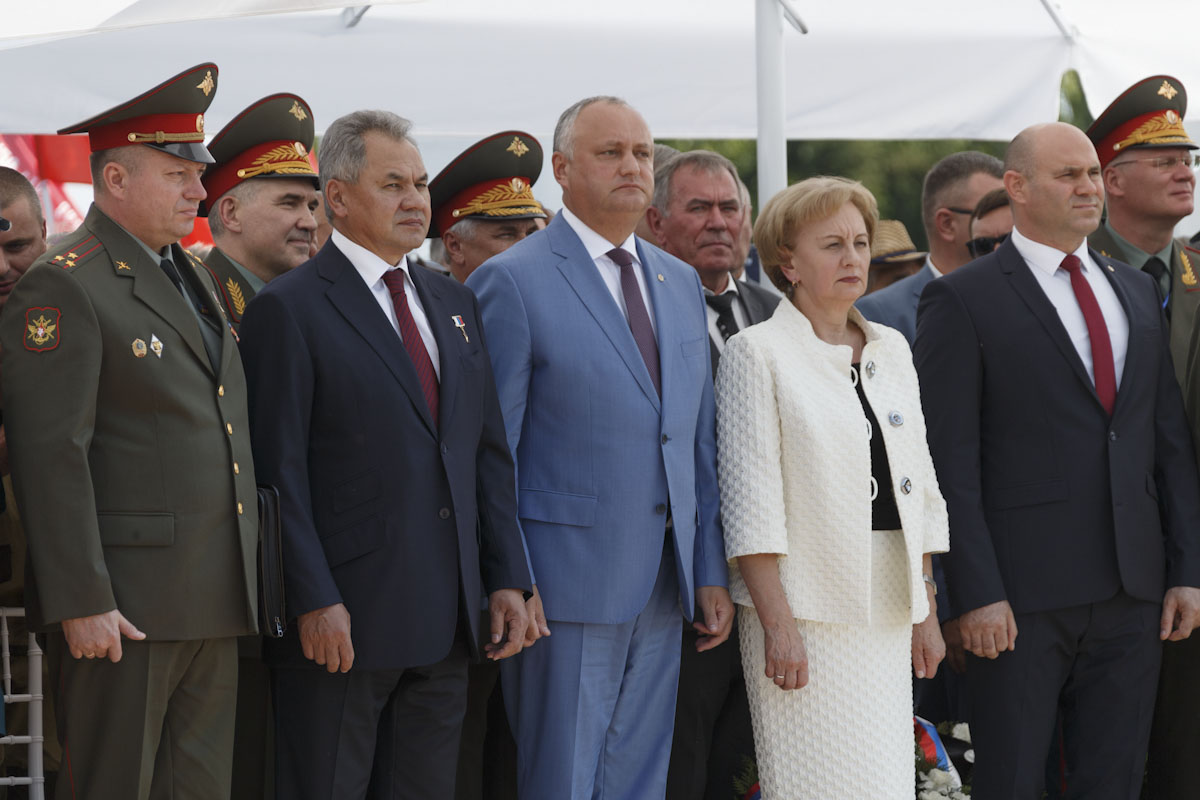
From left to the right: Sergey Shoigu, Igor Dodon, Zinaida Greceanîi and Pavel Voicu in 2019, during the celebration of the Liberation Day

On 17 October 2017, the Constitutional Court of Moldova decided that Dodon was temporarily unable to perform his duties for failing to swear in proposed Defence Minister Eugen Sturza.

On 2 January 2018, the Constitutional Court of Moldova decided that Dodon was temporarily unable to perform his duties for failing to swear in a number of seven ministers.

Several days later the Constitutional Court once again temporarily suspended Dodon, due to his veto on a bill on restricting Russian news broadcasts. This allowed the parliament to bypass his veto and enact a law restricting Russian television broadcasts. The law bans television channels from broadcasting news and analytical programs from countries that have not signed the regional agreement for the European Broadcasting Area, such as Russia.

On 24 September 2018, he was again suspended from his duties for not approving the candidate for Minister of Health.

On 9 June 2019, the Constitutional Court of the Republic of Moldova decided to temporarily suspend Igor Dodon as president, and Prime Minister Pavel Filip was appointed the interim president, who signed the decree on the dissolving parliament and holding early elections on 6 September. The document was cancelled on 11 June 2019 on the ground that it did not comply with the constitutional standards.

=== Position on Transnistria ===
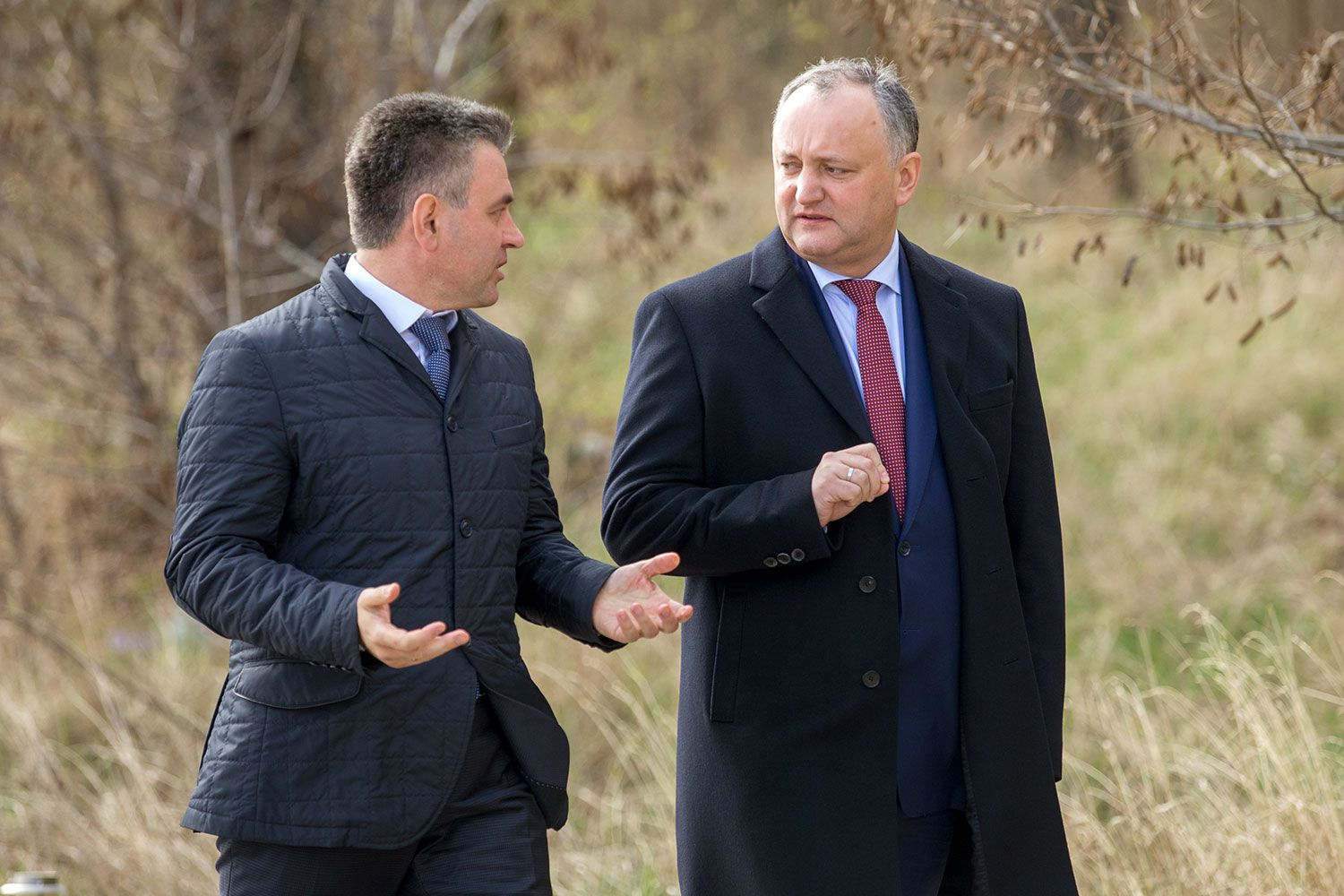
Dodon with Transnistrian President Vadim Krasnoselsky in 2017

Dodon has regularly changed his stance on the future of Transnistria. At the beginning of his presidency, he suggested that Moldova be federalized. Currently, Dodon believes that the region should receive autonomous status like Gagauzia. In relation to this, he has said the following: "Pro-Russian president Igor Dodon, elected in December 2016, has indicated that Transnistria's attempts to gain independence have failed: 'They either have Moldova or Ukraine to unite with. Nobody else [...].'"

=== Foreign policy ===
==== Surrounding countries ====
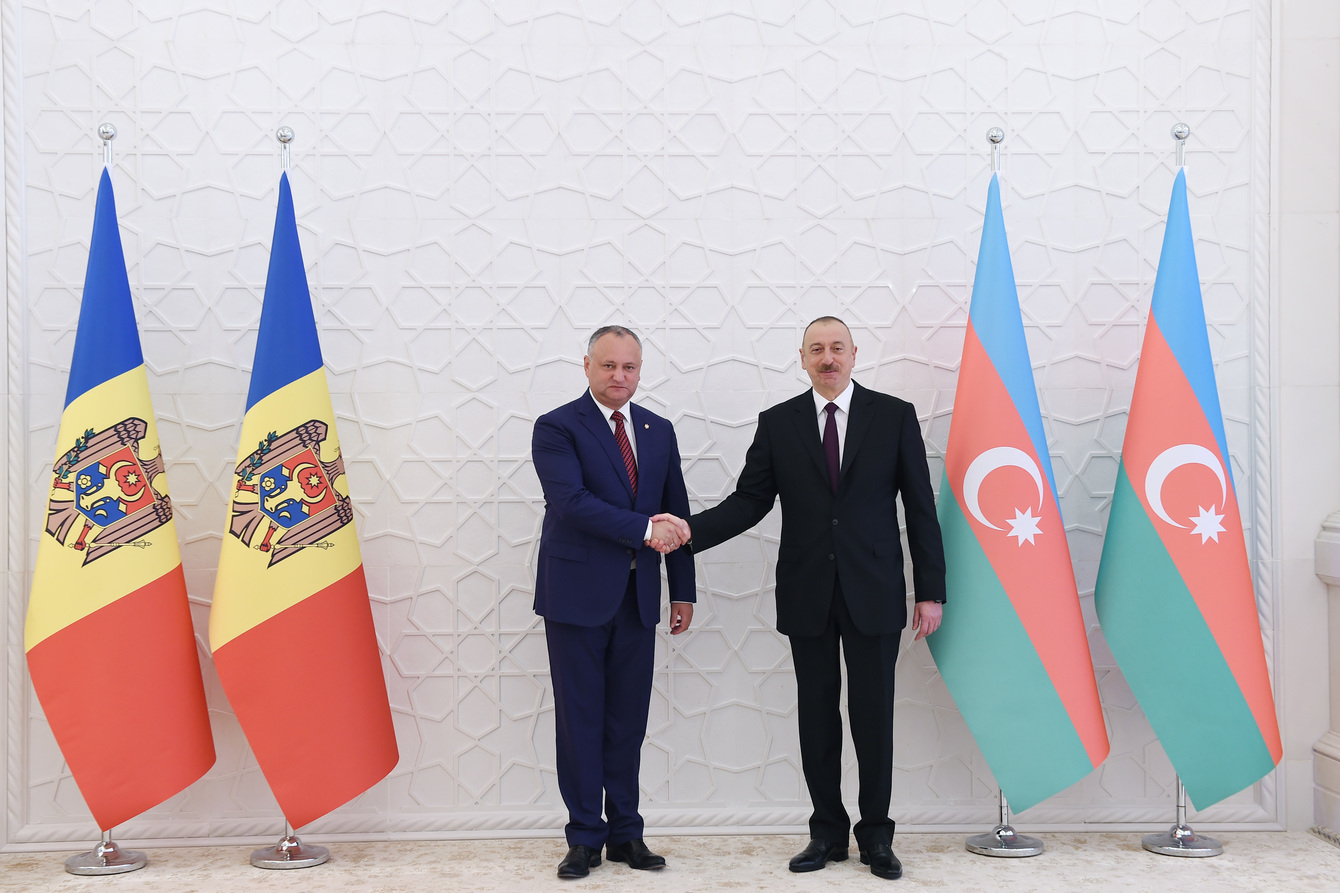
Dodon with Azerbaijani President Ilham Aliyev in Baku on 22 June 2017

In January 2017, Dodon stated that Moldova would not officially recognize Crimea as Russian, stressing that "we need to build friendships with Ukraine, we need to solve the Transnistrian problem." In September of that year, Ambassador of Ukraine to Moldova Ivan Hnatyshyn stated that he does not expect a visit to (Ukrainian capital) Kyiv by Dodon because he "doesn't respect the territorial integrity of my country". During a meeting with Bulgarian President Rumen Radev, Dodon reiterated that the Gagauz city of Taraclia, which is inhabited by ethnic Bulgarians, will not be affected his government's planned territorial administrative reform.

Throughout his presidency, Dodon never undertook an official visit to the Romanian capital of Bucharest. In March, he announced his belief that Romanians who support the Unification of Moldova and Romania as the country's "number one enemy", going further in an interview with Radio Free Europe by saying that the Bucharest government supports any attempt at unionism. During a meeting with President Klaus Iohannis in New York City, Dodon told his Romanian counterpart that the development of Romanian relations was a "key priority" for his government.

==== Russia ====
Igor Dodon is considered a pro-Russian politician and in favor of the federalization of Moldova, which is in line with the views of Deputy Prime Minister of Russia Dmitry Kozak and his 2003 Kozak memorandum. In late September 2019, months after the constitutional crisis, Dodon stated that the country had abandoned its anti-Russian stance through its partnership with the Party of Action and Solidarity led by Prime Minister Maia Sandu. In late August 2020, he announced his plans to take the Russian COVID-19 vaccine during a visit to Russia in September–October, justifying this by saying that he has "more trust in a Russian vaccine than in an American one".

==== On Europe ====
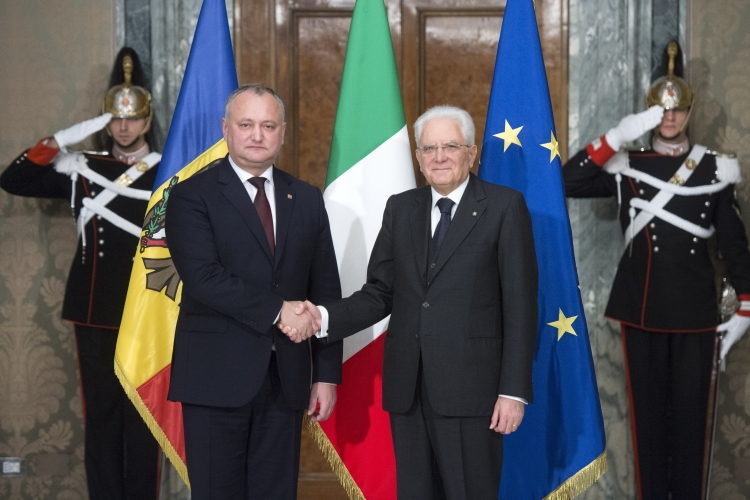
Dodon with Italian President Sergio Mattarella in November 2017

During a 2020 speech to the Parliamentary Assembly of the Council of Europe, he stated that "we support the idea of creating a united Europe from Lisbon to Vladivostok."

==== Other countries ====
Speaking in Comrat in August 2018 when referencing the country's allies, Dodon said "we have friends who are close to Gagauzia, and I believe to Moldova, as well, they are Russia and Turkey." In December 2018, following his state visit to Israel, he reportedly said that he is considering moving the Moldovan embassy from Tel Aviv to Jerusalem. In July 2017, he was criticized by pro-EU politicians for welcoming an official delegation of the Workers' Party of Korea led by former Foreign Minister Ri Su-yong to participate in the 20th anniversary of the Moldovan Socialist Party. MP Iurie Leanca wrote, "Comrade Dodon, please stop! It's time to become civilized and think maturely!", saying that "We are in Europe, we're supposed to be Europeans, where the values of democracy are at the basis of all states." Dodon said in his meeting that he thinks that North Korea "has a huge potential for developing commercial ties, being interested in several categories of agricultural products from the Republic of Moldova, especially about the Moldovan wines".

==== On neutrality ====
On 3 October 2017, Dodon became the first Moldovan leader to ever hold a working meeting with commanders of units in the National Army. During this meeting, he laid out his vision for the armed forces, according to his foreign policy doctrine he instituted the previous month. The doctrine he outlined had called for a complete ban of the participation of servicement from the Moldovan National Army in overseas exercises without his consent.

==== Foreign visits ====
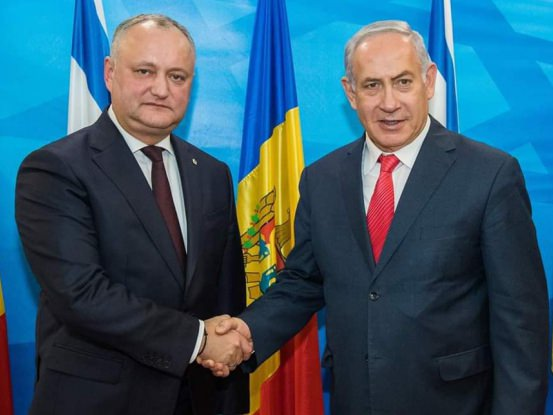
Igor Dodon with Benjamin Netanyahu, 2018

His first two international visits were to Moscow, and Brussels. Since he took office in December 2016, he has made 47 foreign visits to 19 countries, with 20 of those visits being to Russia. In late October 2019, he visited Istanbul to attend the opening ceremony of Istanbul Airport as well as the ceremony for the Turkish Republic's 95th anniversary. In February and September 2019 respectively, he attended the Munich Security Conference in Germany and the Seventy-fourth session of the United Nations General Assembly in New York City both for the first time. During the UN visit, he referred to his attendance as "a successful one" during which he and his delegation "were able to promote the interests and aspirations of the Republic of Moldova on the international arena". He attended the 2018 FIFA World Cup opening ceremony in Moscow in June 2018 and the 2019 European Games in Minsk just over a year later. In October 2018, he attended a summit of the Organisation internationale de la Francophonie in Yerevan where he delivered a speech in the French language.

==== State and official visits hosted by Dodon in Chișinău ====
Country	Leader	Date(s)	Notes
Belarus	Alexander Lukashenko	April 2018	
Republic of Macedonia	Gjorge Ivanov	16–18 July 2018	
Turkey	Recep Tayyip Erdoğan	17–18 October 2018	
Hungary	Viktor Orbán	15 March 2020	

=== 2020 election ===
After the first round, he criticized the Moldovan diaspora as being out of touch with the Moldovan mainland when the polls showed their preference for Maia Sandu, referring to them as "in a real way, a parallel electorate for Moldova."

On 3 November, during the second round of the elections, while Dodon was talking about his opponent Sandu, he modified a proverb and said nu schimbați porumbelul din mână pe coțofana de pe gard (do not change the pigeon on your hand by the magpie on the fence), referring to himself as the "pigeon". This resulted in an outbreak of memes on social media in Moldova. This has also been used as an insult by citizens opposing Dodon, including members of the diaspora, who were attacked by him earlier. Sandu responded to this by declaring that "an injured pigeon came out to the press and began to chant songs of mourning" and later uploaded a video to her TikTok account feeding pigeons, saying that "they are not at fault".

The day after the elections, Dodon met with the parliamentary faction of the PSRM, thanking them for their support in campaign. During the meeting, the Socialist deputies proposed the idea of Dodon to returning to the helm of the PSRM.

He came under fire for not allocating to president-elect Sandu a guard from the State Protection and Guard Service, which is traditionally given to the incoming president at the instructions of the incumbent president. After Sandu was sworn in on 24 December 2020 in the Palace of the Republic, she met Dodon at the Presidential Palace, for a ceremony in which Dodon officially transferred power to her.

== Post-presidency ==
In a telephone conversation with Deputy Kremlin Chief of Staff Dmitry Kozak, he announced that he would be visiting Russia as head of the PSRM. During his visit, he negotiated the extension of the tariff-free preferential exports from Moldova to Russia. Dodon said in an interview with TASS in Moscow that he had discouraged people from pouring into the streets after the election in order to prevent a "Maidan" scenario in the country. He also said commenting on the election results that "there will be a sobering up of a very large number of people who will understand that they were wrong". He also accused Sandu of trying to usurp power in the country. He would later declare the composition of her Supreme Security Council to be a threat to national security. During the 2021 Russian protests, he accused "Western geopolitical players" of "trying to destabilize the situation around Russia", adding that he did not believe footage released by Russian opposition leader Alexei Navalny about "Putin's Palace" to be authentic.

In March 2021, Dodon proposed to use Moldova's foreign currency reserves amid the COVID-19 pandemic, being opposed by Octavian Armașu, governor of the National Bank of Moldova, who referred to the proposal as unlawful.

On 6 May 2021, he visited Minsk with Zinaida Greceanîi to unveil a monument to Moldovan Hero of the Soviet Union Ion Soltys. During the visit, he met with President Lukashenko at his private home in the capital.

=== Election season ===
In May, he, alongside former President Vladimir Voronin, formed an electoral alliance known as the Electoral Bloc of Communists and Socialists to contest in the 2021 Moldovan parliamentary election. The announcement came as a surprise as Dodon and Voronin have accused each other of treason and political corruption.

== Controversies ==
=== Flag change proposals ===
In 2010, the Party of Communists (PCRM) started promoting a new official flag for Moldova. In March 2012, Igor Dodon and the Party of Socialists (PSRM) invited PCRM to initiate a referendum to change the national flag of Moldova from the original tricolour (similar to Romania's, except charged with Moldova's coat of arms) to a red-blue bicolor flag. The Academy of Sciences of Moldova called the flag proposal a "pure political invention".

In November 2012, Dodon posted on his Facebook profile a photo that shows him wearing clothes printed with a patch of the Russian flag, which was criticized as a sign of Dodon's alleged Russophilia.

=== Position related to the annexation of Crimea by Russian Federation ===
In October 2016, during the presidential election campaign, Igor Dodon affirmed that Crimea, the subject of a territorial dispute between Russia and Ukraine, "is a territory of the Russian Federation".

=== Expulsion of the Turkish professors ===
In September 2018, seven Turkish teachers, from the "Orizont" High School administration were declared undesirable by the government and expelled from the country. Due to this, on 11 June 2019, the European Court of Human Rights condemned the Republic of Moldova, and imposed the Republic of Moldova's government to pay 25,000 Euros to five of the seven Turkish citizens.

Opposition leaders accused President Igor Dodon and the Democratic Party of Moldova, the ruling party, of intentional violations of law and human rights in order to gain benefits from Ankara authorities, including the renovation of the Presidency building from Turkey's money. The "Our Party" municipal councilor Ilan Cașu considered that this SIS's operation was the President Dodon payment for the renovation of the Presidency building that was renovated with Turkish money. Previously, before coming to power, the ACUM's block position was based on the fact that behind the Turkish teachers "expel" would be Igor Dodon. The PAS's statement, published on the party's Facebook page, was mentioned, "For money designed to the renovation of the Presidency building and for the other goods procurement, the human rights are violated in Moldova and this is inadmissible". The leader of the Dignity and Truth Platform Party, Andrei Năstase, the former Deputy Prime Minister and former Minister of Internal Affairs compared the SIS with the NKVD. In his opinion, the workers of this institution have acted on the command of the leader of the Democratic Party Vladimir Plahotniuc and of the president Dodon. However, their position changed after the establishment of the Parliamentary majority with PSRM. The chairman of the National Security Commission and the MP of the Dignity and Truth Platform, Chiril Moțpan, who is investigating the expulsion of Turkish teachers, claimed that the president had no attribution to this case.

=== Negotiation of 8–9 June 2019 ===
On 7 June 2019, at the Democratic Party headquarter, according to Andrian Candu, President Igor Dodon negotiated with Vladimir Plahotniuc the conditions of establishing the coalition between PSRM and DP. Andrian Candu announced only some "criteria for creating the coalition". According to him, the socialists asked for federalization of the Republic of Moldova and providing the special statute to the Transnistrian region, launching the negotiation among Republic of Moldova, European Union and Russian Federation on trade policy, changing the Constitution of the Republic of Moldova, and the election of the President of the Republic of Moldova by the Parliament.

On 8 June 2019, before the Meeting of Parliament of the Republic of Moldova, the temporary coalition ACUM-PSRM was established, Dodon has declared that there were some pressure on him to tender the resignation, anticipating the appearance of some compromising videos.

Later, after the statements made by Andrian Candu, deputy head of the DPM, some videos have appeared at the Publika TV, one of the TV posts owned by the democratic party leader, where Igor Dodon has confirmed to Vlad Plahotniuc, that he has received the money from the Russian Federation on a monthly basis for PSRM maintenance, and also about presentation of federalisation plan of the Republic of Moldova coordinated with Russian Federation. The President Igor Dodon had recognized that the negotiations took place to establishing the majority, the discussion at which had included the participation of the businessman Serghei Iaralov. Regarding the videos that have appeared in public space he has declared that "All these, and some of them are ripped out of context or were montages." Vladimir Plahotniuc has confirmed the fact that negotiated with Igor Dodon within 3 months period: "The coalition DP+PSRM was almost made, but failed, because I refused to sign for the country federalization".

=== Accusations and denunciations against Igor Dodon ===
In November 2014, the socialist politician of Russian ethnicity Valentin Crîlov accused Igor Dodon of being an "instrument of scenarios that would cause 'bloodshed' in Moldova", and labeled the Party of Socialists as "being in the service of another country" such as Russia. He also accused the party of becoming a threat to the "stability, peace and the very existence" of the Republic of Moldova and its extraordinarily large base of financial resources — the origin of which bear "reasonable doubt".

On 29 August 2017, the criminal complaint against Igor Dodon was submitted by Maia Sandu at the General Prosecutor's Office, by which was requested the criminal liability for Igor Dodon for committing the offense of Treason against the State and for the crime related to Instigation to hate, differentiating and division by national, ethnical, racial and religious criteria.

The Party of National Unity had filed a criminal complaint at the General Prosecutor's Office against President Igor Dodon. On 8 August 2019, at the press conference with the topic "Presentation of the criminal complaint against Igor Dodon. Arguments and facts" the criminal complaint was presented by Anatol Șalaru, the executive president of the party, an MP in the first Parliament of the Republic of Moldova and the deputy-president of the Liberal Party. The reason serves the video tape that reflected the discussions held among Igor Dodon and former PD leader Vladimir Plahotniuc, which appeared in the press in June 2019.

In October 2019, Octavian Țîcu requested to be established the investigation Committee "to investigate the acts of treason committed by Igor Dodon". The Bloc "ACUM"s MPs, Iurie Reniță and Lilian Carp, have joined these initiative.

The MP Iurie Reniță at the press conference has accused the socialists of money laundering in the large proportions, requesting the Prosecutor General to hold the involved persons liable. According to the documents, to which the MP has referred, the money have been transferred to Moldova through Exclusive Media Ltd., that belonges to Corneliu Furcutliță, who is the MP from PSRM side. Based on some loan contracts, the billions of Moldovan lei have been transferred from this company to the party's sponsors. In the document published by Reniță, the reporter officer has mentioned that the money came from offshore have been used in the presidential electoral campaign, that at the end has been won by Igor Dodon, the PSRM leader at that time.

In March 2020, the MPs Iurie Reniță, Octavian Țîcu and Lilian Carp have presented the documents that would confirm the PSRМ's MPs implication. According to the documents at least 30 MPs affiliated to the Socialist Party, have received from Russia, through an off-shore account in the Bahamas some funds, whose main beneficiary is Igor Dodon. Later, the MP Iurie Renița has published a document that demonstrated the First Lady of Moldova, Galina Dodon has a right for the banking signature on behalf of the "Exclusiv-Media" LLC. The MP has mentioned that: "one of the sources for illegal financing of the presidential campaign of Igor Dodon held in 2016 was from the Russian Federation through Bahamas, via laundering of about 1,5 million Euros. Further these money were "lend" through the "Exlusiv-Media" LLC to several PSRM."

In May 2020, the former head of the Anticorruption Prosecutor's Office Viorel Morari declared, during the show Cabinetul din Umbră on Jurnal TV, that in the bag that Ilan Shor has shown to the public at the press conference at the beginning of 2019, sending a message to President Igor Dodon, it would have been 1.5 million Euros. According to Morari, the Dodon family would have accepted the payment of the flights and luxury trips from the money coming from the economic agents managed by Ilan Shor.

According to the 4 July 2020 article published by The Brussels Times, several voices in the Republic of Moldova believe that the pro-Russian government crosses all red lines in order to maintain power in Chișinău in the interest of Russia. The source mentions that "the case of Dr. Gațcan shows how far President Igor Dodon can go, who actually controls power in Chișinău." The source also refers to the increasingly frequent accusations regarding the establishment of the dictatorship in the Republic of Moldova, but also to the efforts of opposition politicians to mobilize their forces to reduce the influence of Igor Dodon and the administrative resources he can benefit from at the election campaign in autumn.

=== Lukashenko election ===
Following the 2020 Belarusian presidential election, Dodon congratulated President Alexander Lukashenko on his controversial victory. After this, a group of protesters demonstrated in front of the Belarusian embassy in Chișinău, coming with banners saying "Down with dictatorship!", "Down with censorship!", and "Belarus will be free!". The protesters particularly criticized Dodon for allowing himself to congratulate Lukashenko on behalf of the Moldovan people, in spite of the negative feelings towards the Belarusian leader at the time.

=== Financing and influence of Russia ===
The Russian presidential administration has a so-called "Moldovan department" headed by Igor Maslov, a colonel of the Foreign Intelligence Service. His subordinates prepare references on Moldovan politicians, public figures and non-governmental organizations for the Russian leadership. During his long, political career, Igor Dodon has closely cooperated with former and current Russian intelligence officers working in various government positions in the leadership of the Russian Federation. As RISE Moldova journalists found out, MP and then President Dodon had supervisors from the so-called "Moldovan department" of the Kremlin, with whom he, like some other Moldovan politicians, kept in touch through intermediaries and directly. The Socialist leader often regularly flew to Moscow during important internal political events in Moldova. In 2016 alone, before being elected president of Moldova in December, Igor Dodon visited Moscow at least 10 times. "Kremlinovic" was Dodon's nickname. This was the name of the user account from which Dodon communicated in a secret chat room of the BBM messenger. His interlocutors were people from politics, business, public administration, expert community (NGOs) and the power bloc of Moldova.

Even after leaving the post of the Moldovan president, pro-Kremlin forces helped Dodon to open a public organization in Moldova called "Moldovan-Russian Business Union". And the money for the work of this Union came also from the Russian Federation - at the expense of donations from Russian businessmen.

In 2021, a new non-governmental organization, the Moldovan-Russian Business Union (MRBU), was created and headed by Igor Dodon. He approved a salary ten times higher than his presidential salary. The founder of this organization on the Russian side is the largest Russian association "Business Russia". In just six months, the union has received $300 thousand from "Business Russia". RISE Moldova journalists together with the "Dossier" Center found six bank payments from Russia to the account of Dodon's organization for almost 5 million lei (about $300 thousand). And almost every tranche is accompanied by anti-Western or pro-Russian statements by the former Moldovan president and his associates. Almost all anti-government rallies demanding the resignation of President Maia Sandu were also carried out under direct orders from the Kremlin and for substantial fees. For example, on October 5, 2021, Dodon, as a member of the Moldovan parliament and chairman of the Party of Socialists of the Republic of Moldova (PSRM), called on the head of the European Union mission in Chisinau and other foreign diplomats "not to interfere in the internal affairs of the state". On the same day, the Russian account of Business Russia received a tranche of 2.8 million rubles from Russian citizen Igor Chaika. On the website of the organization, he is presented as a business ambassador of Business Russia in Moldova. In addition, Igor Chaika is the son of former Russian Prosecutor General Yuri Chaika. He is included in the EU sanctions list for destabilizing the situation in Moldova, and Igor Chaika is also banned from entering the country.

RISE reports that since the Russian invasion of Ukraine began, neither Dodon nor his partners from Business Russia have publicly spoken out against the Kremlin. Since the invasion began, MRDS has sent two more transactions, in March and April 2022.

On the organization's website, Dodon continues to openly support Putin, insistently urging the Moldovan authorities to engage in dialogue with the Kremlin on trade cooperation and Russian gas prices. And the MRDS newsfeed is filled with accusations of Ukraine's food crisis.

In the nongovernmental sector, Dodon has also surrounded himself with people who worked with Russian political technologists, whom the U.S. authorities have placed on a sanctions list for the Kremlin's operations in Moldova and for attempts to interfere in Moldovan elections.

=== 2022 arrest for corruption and treason ===
On 24 May 2022, Dodon was arrested by the Moldovan authorities on charges of corruption for the receipt of bribes, illegal financing of his political party, and high treason against Moldova through receiving funds to fugitive Moldovan politician Vladimir Plahotniuc in order to intercede on Plahotniuc's behalf regarding criminal cases filed in Russia. Investigators searched his home. He was then put under house arrest for 30 days. It was discovered he had an airline ticket for leaving Moldova at 9:00am on 26 May and large sums of foreign currency, which raised suspicion about his actions. The United States Department of the Treasury has also accused Dodon of corruption and conspiring with Russia through his political aides to interfere with the Moldovan elections and rig the media in his favour.

Dodon has accused Sandu of having politicized judicial cases against him. The Deputy Foreign Minister of Russia Andrei Rudenko said that Russia would assure the rights of Dodon and that any prosecution would respect international practice.

Dodon's brother-in-law, Petru Merineanu, was also put under preventive detention for 30 days. After searching his house, prosecutors found evidence of transactions worth €700,000, and €73,000 in cash in the possession of Petru Merineanu. Anticorruption agencies have seized assets worth $100,000. Petru Merineanu was released from house arrest in October 2022.

Igor Dodon was released from house arrest on 18 November 2022 pending a court trial on all charges and was instructed not to leave the country. In the year to September 2023 25 hearings have been scheduled, but only 3 held, with 11 postponed and 11 interrupted. Dodon is accused of providing an opinion during his tenure as Minister of Economy, which led to the signing of a contract in May 2008 for the procurement of electricity at an inflated price for the Republic of Moldova. The damage inflicted is estimated at 123 million lei. Igor Dodon, is also targeted in two other cases, he denies the accusations. On 24 November 2025, the Supreme Court ordered the trial to be resumed from the beginning because of the change in the judicial panel, which legally requires the investigation phase to begin again. The restart of the trial is scheduled for 25 November 2026.

== Personal life ==
Dodon married Galina Dodon in 1999 and together they have three children: Bogdan, Vlad, and Nicolae. His oldest son, Vlad, is a passionate player of water polo. His brother Aleksander is a co-owner alongside Igor Chaika (son of Yuri Chaika, Prosecutor General of Russia) of the Industrial Ecological Operator company which deals with waste.

Aside from his native Romanian (which he considers Moldovan), he also speaks Russian, French, and English. However, he has only used the former two in public speeches. He is considered to be good friends with Colonel General Victor Gaiciuc, who is currently one of his advisers. Dodon had proposed Gaiciuc for the position of defense minister after rejecting Eugen Sturza's candidacy. He is a supporter of the Union of Officers of Moldova, where he holds the honorary rank of Major of the Reserve.

On 9 September 2018, Dodon was involved in a car accident on the Chișinău-Călărași highway. Although Dodon wasn't injured himself, his mother and his middle son Nicolae sustained serious injuries.

== Awards ==
- Order of Work Glory (25 March 2008)
- Order of the Holy Sepulchre (Holy See)
- Order of St. Sergius of Radonezh (Russian Orthodox Church)
- Medal "75 Years of Victory in the Great War for the Defense of the Fatherland" (Belarus)

Political offices
Preceded by Nicolae Timofti	President of Moldova; 2016–2020	Succeeded by Maia Sandu
