= Palace of the Republic, Chișinău =

Multi-purpose hall in Chișinău, Moldova

Palace of the Republic
- Palatul Republicii
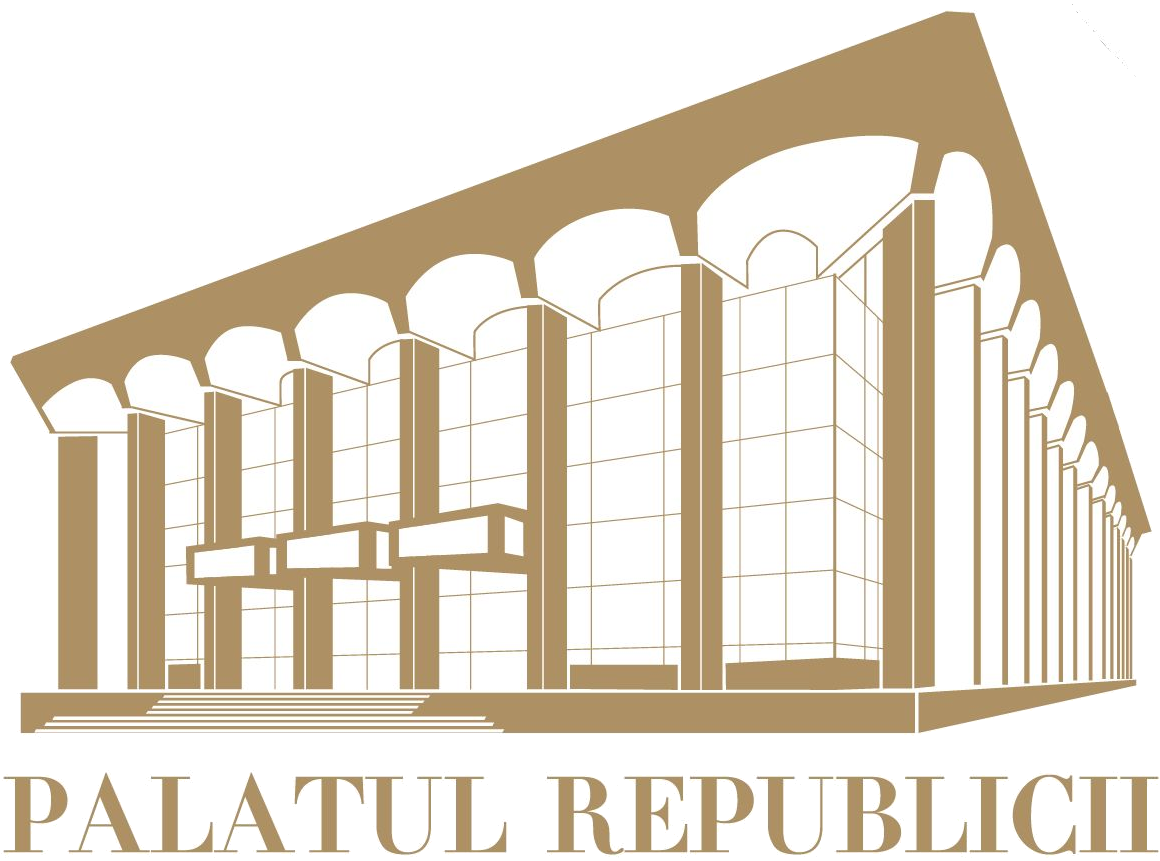

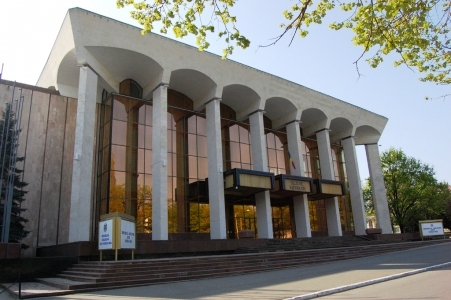
- The palace in July 2013
- Interactive map of the Palace of the Republic area

General information
- Status: Active
- Location: 16 Maria Cebotari Street, Chișinău, Moldova
- Completed: 1984
- Owner: Government of Moldova

Technical details
- Floor count: 4 floors

Design and construction
- Architects: Ivan Zagoretsky; Alexander Shevtsov; Mikhail Orlov; Stanislav Makarchuk

The Palace of the Republic (Romanian: Palatul Republicii) is an official multi-purpose building as well as a concert and theatre hall in Moldova. It is located at the Buiucani sector in the commune of Condrița in Chișinău.

== History ==
It was initially established in 1984 as the Friendship Hall and was renamed in 1988 to the Republican Center for Culture and Art. Its creation was timed to coincide with the golden jubilee of the establishment of the Moldovan Soviet Socialist Republic. It was considered a major work of Bessebarian architect Ivan Zagoryetskiy (Иван Андреевич Загорецкий). On 29 June 1994, the center was converted into the Palace of State Officials with the aim of providing services to the foreign ministry and government. Today, conferences, meetings and workshops are held at the Palace of the Republic. The national government actively rents out the halls in the palace, with the Parliament of the Republic of Moldova meeting here from 2009 to 2014 while repairs were being made to the official government building. The palace was renamed the following year to its current name.

== Events ==
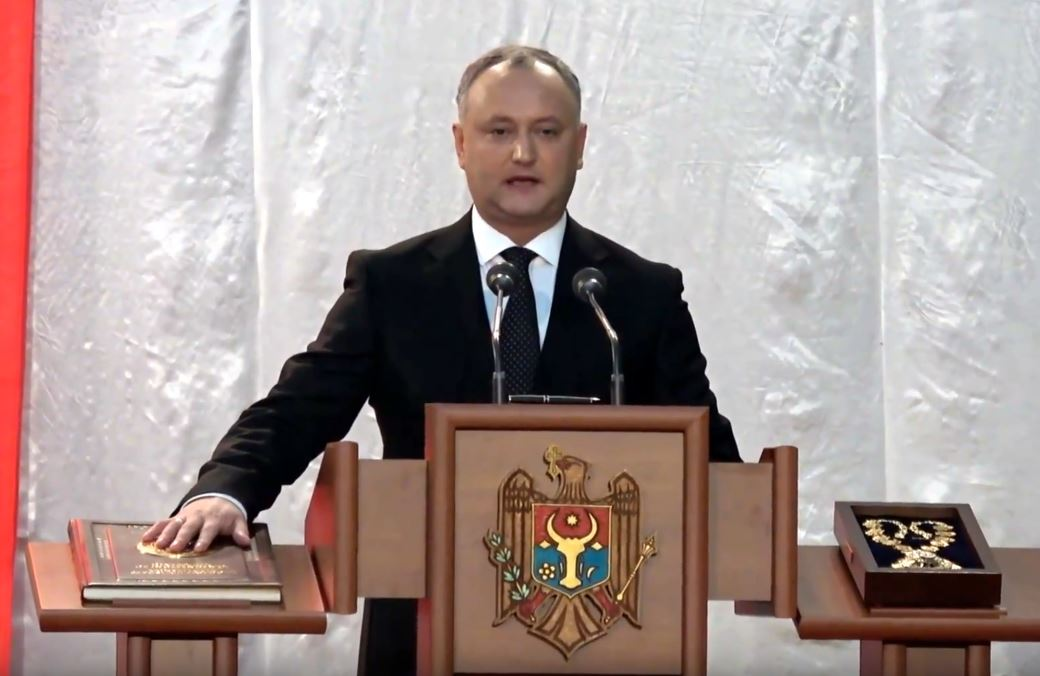
Igor Dodon's swearing in at the palace in 2016.

- On 23 December 2016, President-elect Igor Dodon was sworn in as President of Moldova inside the Palace of the Republic, the first time it was used for such an occasion. Four years later, Maia Sandu was inaugurated at the same venue.
- The Russian-Moldovan Expo in 2017 took place in the palace.
- In 2018, the 12th annual World Congress of Families took place inside the palace.

== See also ==
- Government House, Chișinău
- Presidential Palace, Chișinău
