= Palace of the Republic =

Palace of the Republic may refer to:

- Palace of the Republic, Banja Luka
- Palace of the Republic, Berlin
- Palace of the Republic, Almaty
- Palace of the Republic, Chișinău
- Palace of the Republic, Minsk
