= National Security Council (Moldova) =

Advisory body to the President of Moldova

National Security Council of Moldova
- Consiliul Național de Securitate al Republicii Moldova
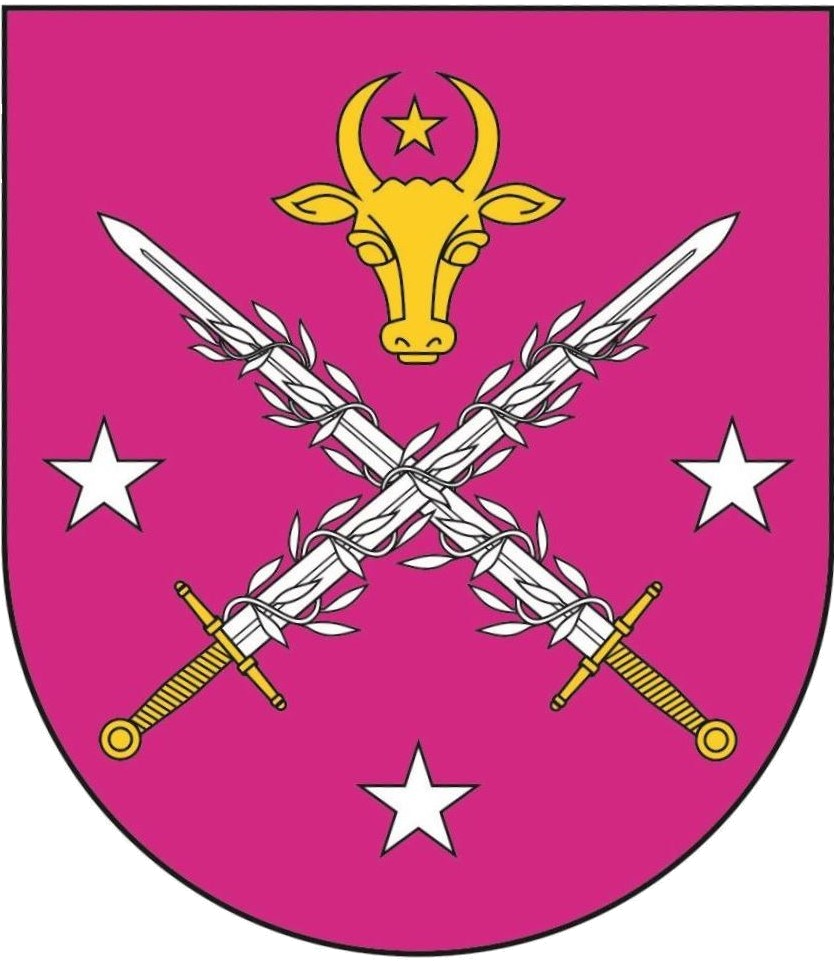
- Seal of the NSC

Agency overview
- Formed: 31 October 1995; 30 years ago
- Jurisdiction: Moldova
- Headquarters: Presidential Palace, Chișinău
- Agency executives: Maia Sandu, President; Stanislav Secrieru, Secretary
- Website: presedinte.md/eng/cadrul-normativ

The National Security Council (NSC) (Romanian: Consiliul Național de Securitate, CNS) is an advisory body to the President of Moldova (concurrently the Supreme Commander-in-Chief of the Moldovan Armed Forces) which aides and assists the President in the implementation of military policy and national security decisions. Its authority is vested in the Constitution of Moldova. The President is one of many permanent members of the council and chairs all of its meetings.

== History ==
It was established as the Supreme Security Council (SSC) (Romanian: Consiliul Suprem de Securitate, CSS) on 31 October 1995. President Maia Sandu renamed it to the National Security Council on 7 November 2025.

== Members ==
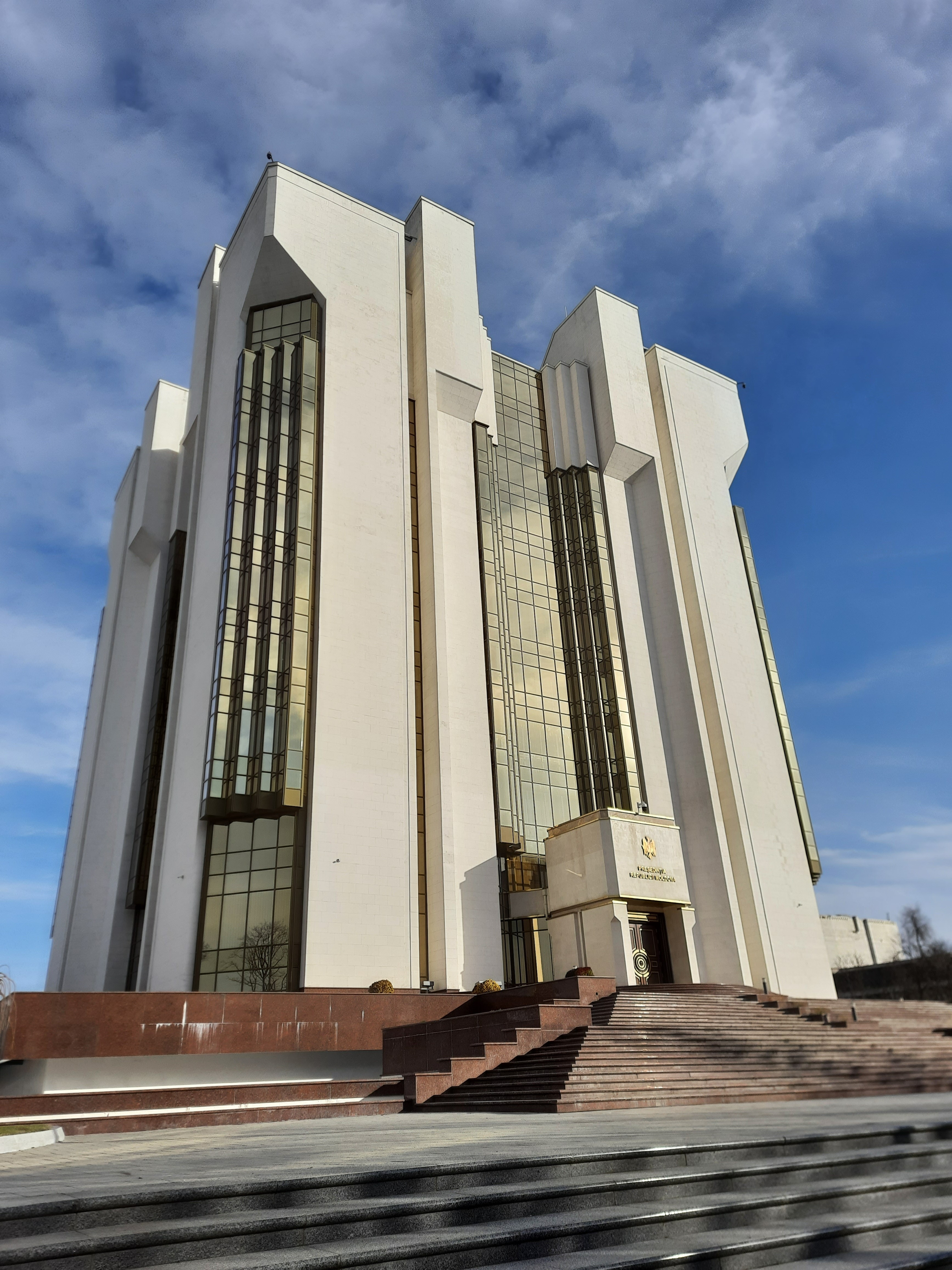
The Presidential Palace in Chișinău is the meeting place of the NSC

Permanent members of the council since October 2009 have included the following:

- Maia Sandu – President of the NSC; President of Moldova
- Stanislav Secrieru – Secretary of the NSC; Defense and National Security Advisor to the President
- Igor Grosu – President of the Parliament
- Vasile Tofan – Prime Minister of Moldova
- Lilian Carp – Chair of the Parliamentary Committee for National Security, Defense and Public Order
- Anatolie Nosatîi – Minister of Defense
- Daniella Misail-Nichitin – Minister of Internal Affairs
- Alexandru Musteață – Director of the Security and Intelligence Service
- Alexandru Machidon – Prosecutor General of Moldova
- Anca Dragu – Governor of the National Bank of Moldova
- Mihai Popșoi – Deputy Prime Minister, Minister of Foreign Affairs
- Valeriu Chiveri – Deputy Prime Minister for Reintegration
- Cristina Gherasimov – Deputy Prime Minister for European Integration
- Vladislav Cojuhari – Minister of Justice
- Victoria Belous – Minister of Finance
- Veronica Roșca – Chair of the Parliamentary Judicial Committee for Appointments and Immunities
- Alexei Buzu – Secretary General of the Government
- Liliana Vițu-Eșanu – Director of the Center for Strategic Communication and Combating Disinformation

Whenever the new composition of the CNS is officiated, the president signs a decree to appoint them as council members. Other non-permanent members such as parliamentary faction leaders and intellectuals are also invited to attend.

In wartime, the CNS is renamed to the National Council on Defense, to which the president chairs the council in their position as Supreme Commander-in-Chief.

== List of Secretaries ==
Portrait	Name	Term start	Term end	President
	Alexandru Gorgan	October 16, 1995	January 17, 1997	Mircea Snegur
	Georgiy Kyrlan	January 17, 1997	June 5, 1998	Petru Lucinschi
	Mihail Plămădeală	June 17, 1998	February 10, 2000	Petru Lucinschi
	Adrian Usatii	February 24, 2000	March 28, 2001	Petru Lucinschi
	Valeriu Gurbulea	18 July 2001	19 February 2004	Vladimir Voronin
	Ion Morei	20 February 2004	11 September 2009	Vladimir Voronin
	Iurie Richicinschi	9 November 2009	11 April 2012	Mihai Ghimpu (acting)
	Iurie Richicinschi	9 November 2009	11 April 2012	Vlad Filat (acting)
	Iurie Richicinschi	9 November 2009	11 April 2012	Marian Lupu (acting)
	Alexei Barbăneagră	11 April 2012	23 December 2016	Nicolae Timofti
	Artur Gumeniuc	3 March 2017	25 June 2019	Igor Dodon
	Victor Gaiciuc	12 August 2019	14 November 2019	Igor Dodon
	Victor Gaiciuc	16 March 2020	9 November 2020	Igor Dodon
	Ana Revenco	21 January 2021	2 September 2021	Maia Sandu
	Dorin Recean	7 February 2022	16 February 2023	Maia Sandu
	Stanislav Secrieru	1 September 2023	Incumbent	Maia Sandu

== See also ==
- Government of Moldova
- Supreme Council of National Defence (Romania)
- National Security and Defense Council of Ukraine
- Security Council of Russia
