= Presidential Palace, Chișinău =

Residence of the President of Moldova

Coordinates: 47.0284°N 28.8281°E

Presidential Palace
- Palatul Președinției
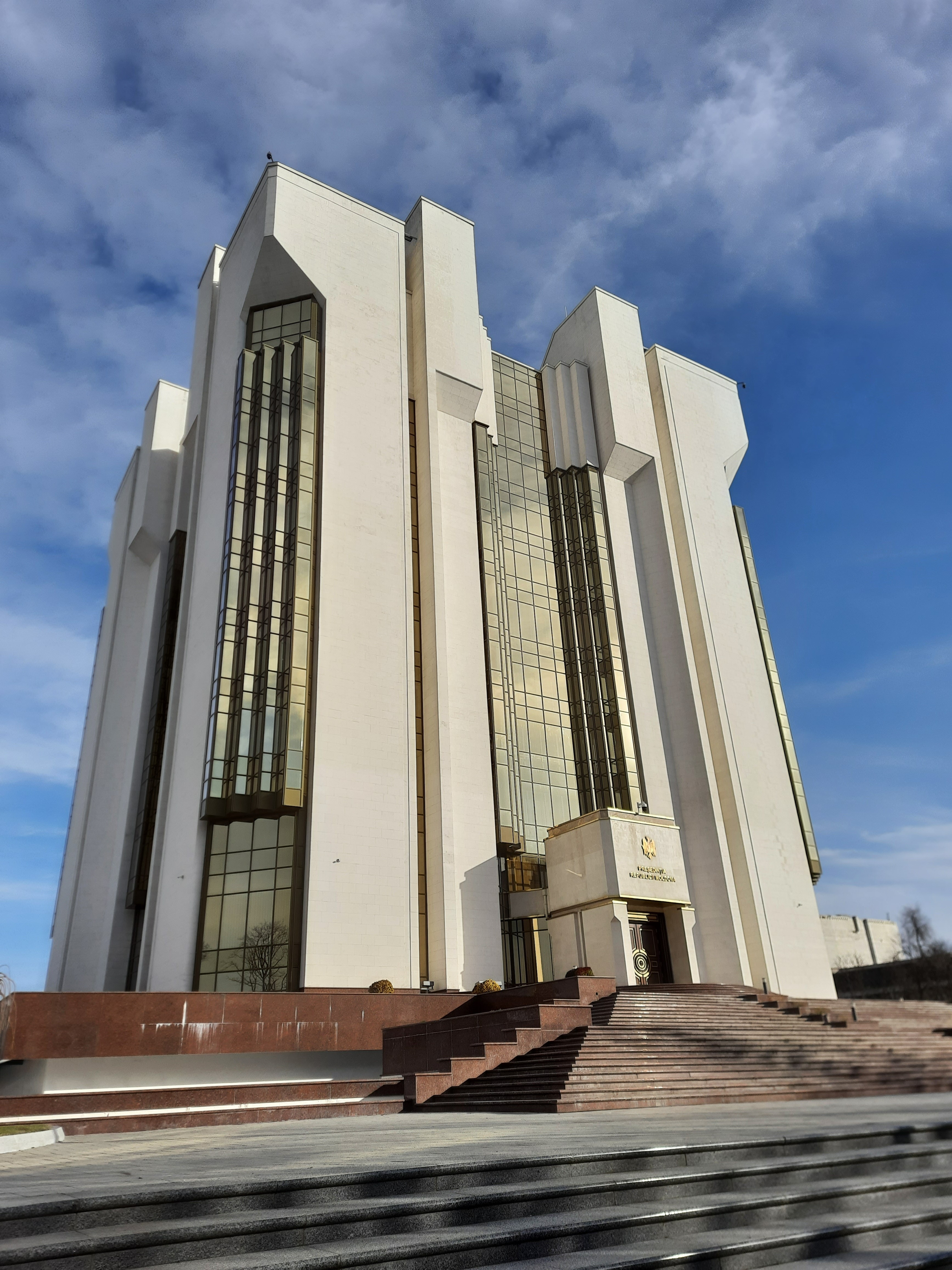
- The palace in 2020
- Interactive map of the Presidential Palace area

General information
- Status: Active
- Location: 164 Stephen the Great Boulevard, Chișinău
- Current tenants: Office of the President of Moldova; National Security Council
- Completed: 1984
- Owner: Government of Moldova

The Presidential Palace (Romanian: Palatul Președinției) is the official residence of the President of Moldova.

== History ==
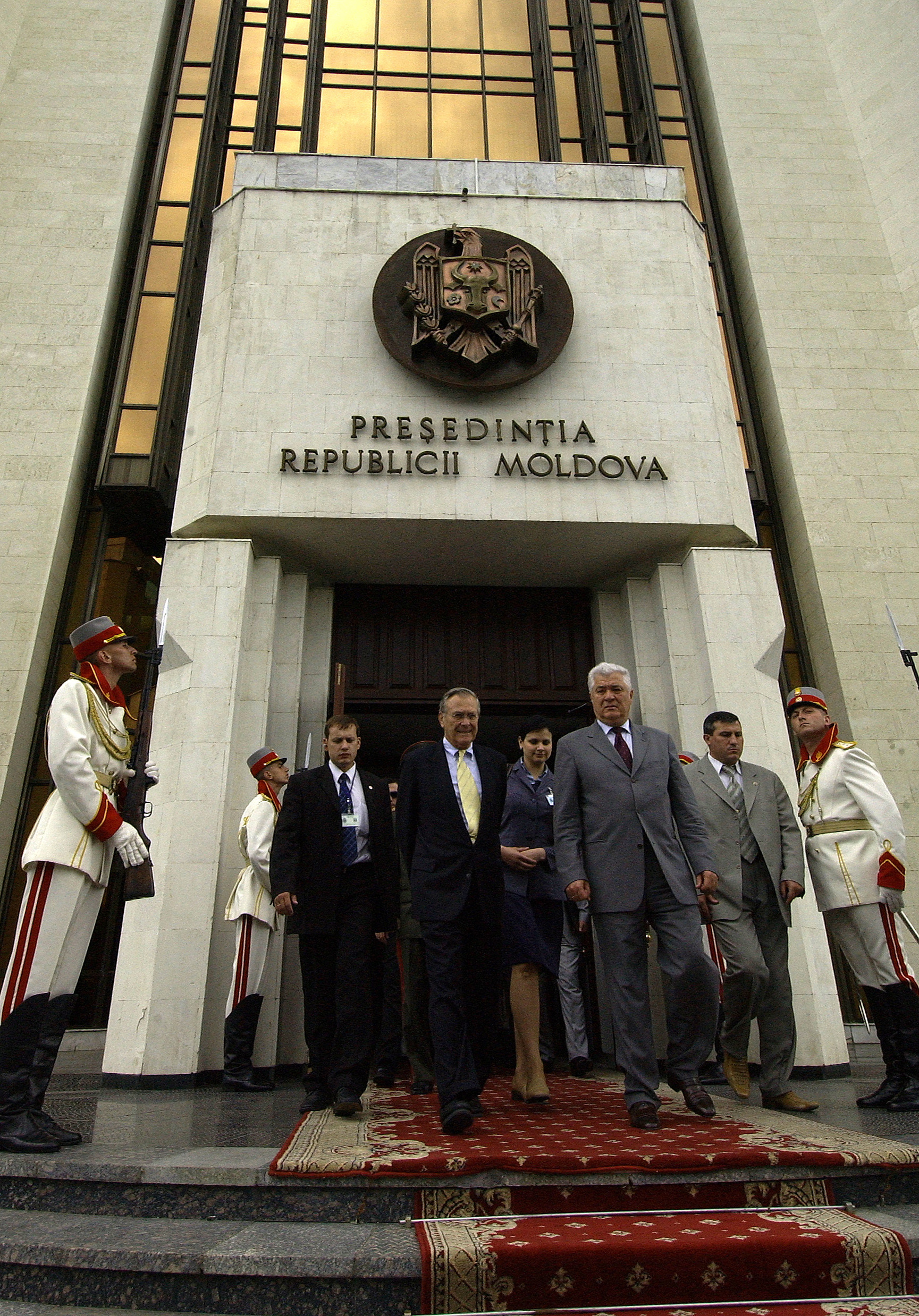
Vladimir Voronin and Donald Rumsfeld at the entrance to the palace.

The building was built between 1984 and 1987 by Yuri Tumanean, Arkady Zaltman, and Viktor Iavorski. The building was built on the site of the German Lutheran Church dating back to the 1830s. It was made to be the new building of the Supreme Soviet of the Moldavian SSR. The Moldovan Declaration of Independence of 27 August 1991 was signed and adopted in the palace by the Supreme Soviet. After Moldova gained its independence, the building became the residence of the president of Moldova starting in 2001 with President Vladimir Voronin. The building was devastated during protests on April 7, 2009 against President Voronin. As a result of the protest, the palace was closed off.

=== Renovations ===
In the early years of the Dodon presidency, steps were taken to renovate the palace with the help of the Turkish government. The newly renovated palace was opened on October 17, 2018, in the presence of President Dodon and Turkish president Recep Tayyip Erdogan. The following January, Dodon invited ex-presidents Petru Lucinschi and Mircea Snegur on a tour of the newly renovated palace. In April 2019, Moldovan journalists were given a tour of the palace to allow the press to have an understanding of the renovations. On Independence Day in 2020, due to the COVID-19 pandemic in Moldova, a national ceremony closed to the public was held in the Historical Hall of the Presidential Palace.

== Description ==
When describing the renovation, President Dodon joked: "There was nothing here when we arrived, but you know, I’m a man who treasures his household, so we brought a few things". Under his term, he had added a wine cellar, an artificial lake, and a chicken farm. His presidency also included the introduction of a Ziua Ușilor Deschise (Open Doors Day) at the palace for Moldovan youth.

== Gallery ==
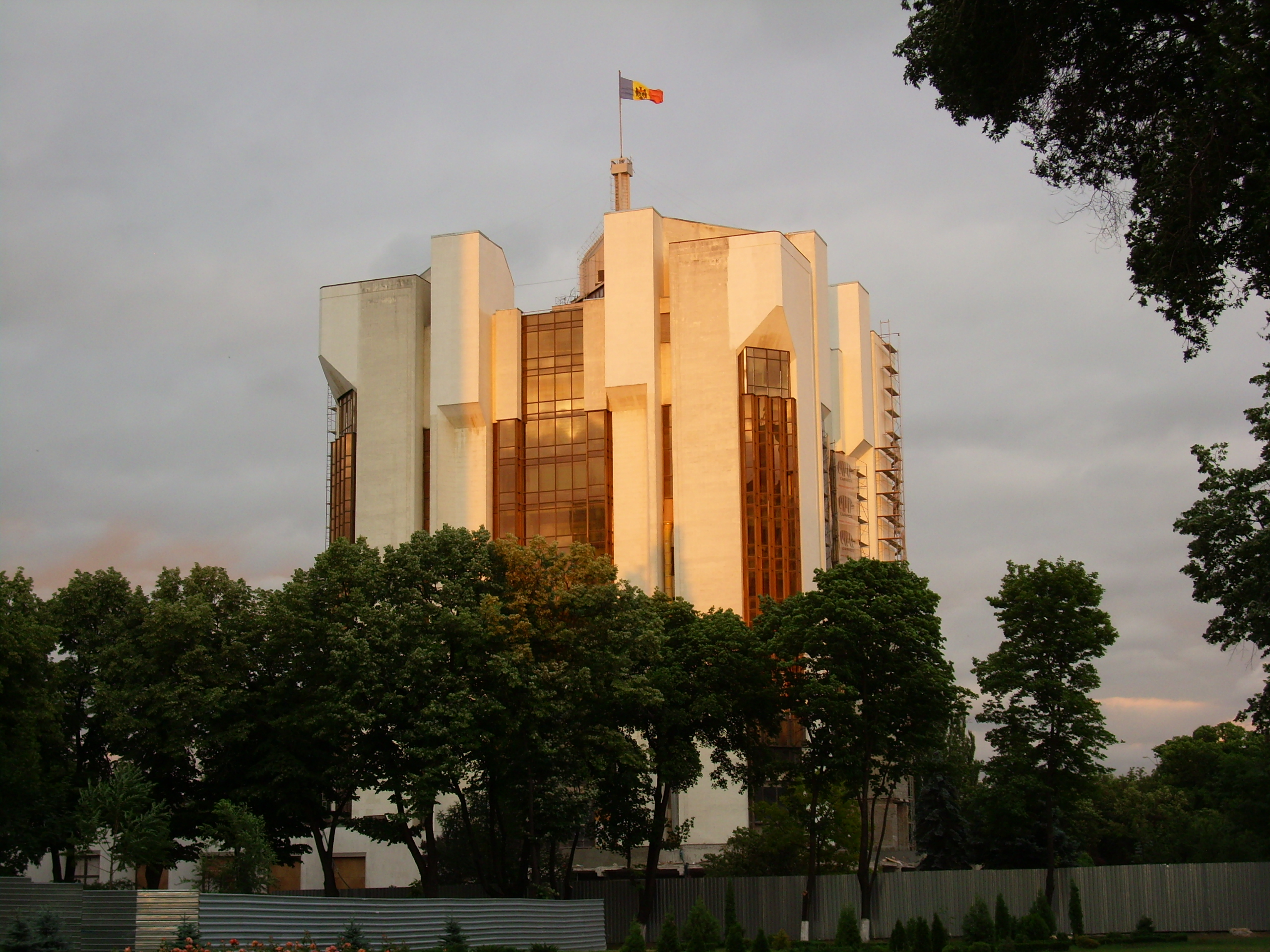

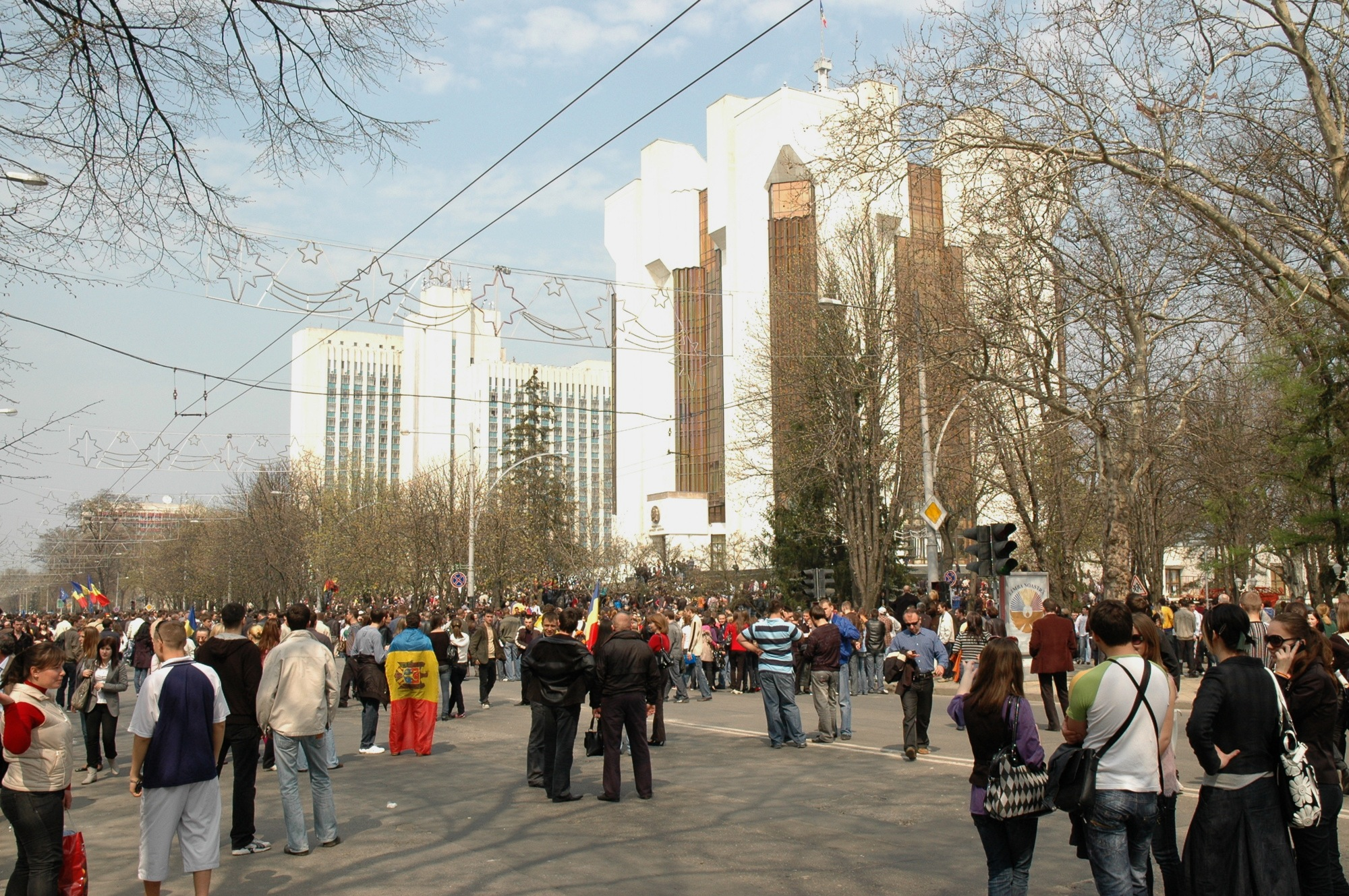
During riots in Chisinau in 2009.

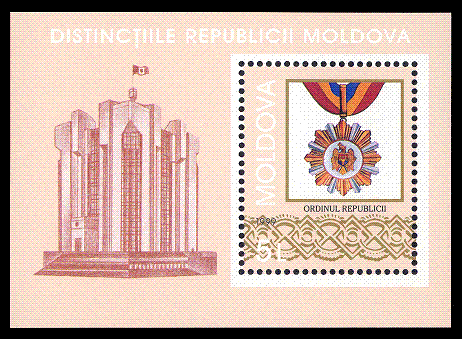
The palace on a Moldovan stamp

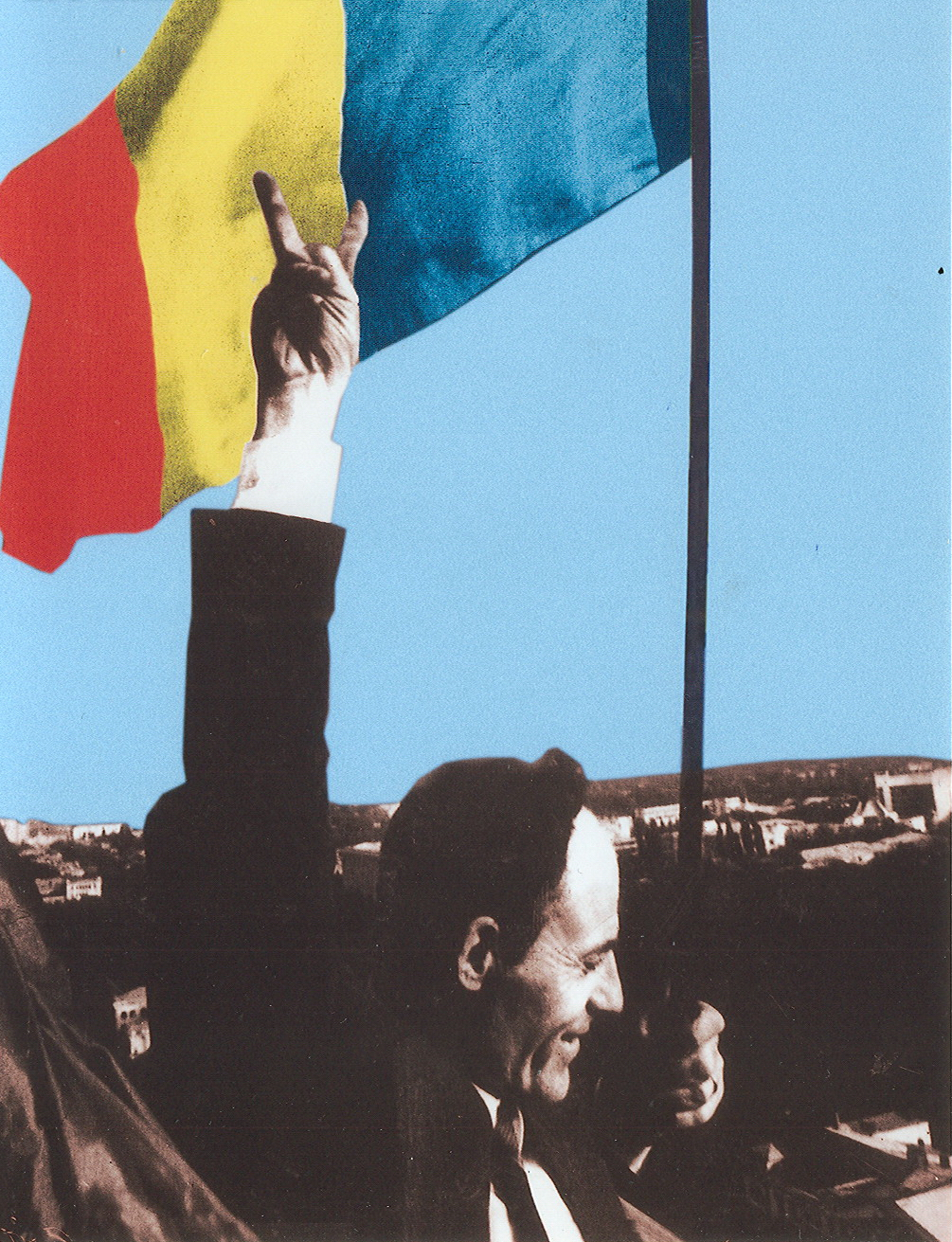
Gheorghe Ghimpu raising the Romanian Flag over the building in 1990.

== See also ==
- Presidential palace
- President of Moldova
- Condrița
- Parliament of the Republic of Moldova
- Government House, Chișinău
- Great National Assembly Square, Chișinău
