= State Protection and Guard Service of Moldova =

State Protection and Guard Service
- Serviciul de Protecție și Pază de Stat

Agency overview
- Formed: 27 January 1992
- Preceding agency: Ministry of National Security of Moldova
- Jurisdiction: President of Moldova
- Headquarters: 26 Sfatul Țării Street, Chișinău
- Employees: Classified
- Agency executives: Alexandru Harea, Director; Gheorghe Josanu, Deputy Director
- Website: spps.md

Footnotes
- It was originally named the Guard Service of the President Moldova or Presidential Guard Service for short.

The State Protection and Guard Service of Moldova (Romanian: Serviciul de Protecție și Pază de Stat al Republicii Moldova, abbreviated SPPS) is a Moldovan independent government agency and institution which has the duty of protecting government officials, as well as foreign dignitaries, and their relatives. It specifically charged with the protection of President of Moldova during his/her travels. It also provides guards for the headquarters and residences of government agencies. It is very similar to the Protection and Guard Service of Romania. The service's motto is Honor et Fides (Honor and Faith).

== History ==
The initially entitled Presidential Guard Service was created by order of Moldovan President Mircea Snegur on 27 January 1992. It was organized as an independent sub-unit of the Ministry of National Security (now the Information and Security Service), being directly subordinated to the President of Moldova. On 6 May 1994, the Presidential Guard Service was renamed the Security Service of the President of Moldova before adopting its current name on 28 January 1998. One month later, on 26 February 1998, the service came under the direct control of government. It would serve as a government agency until June 2008 when it was subordinated again to the president. In 2016, the SPPS came under government jurisdiction again.

== Missions ==
The SPPS takes part in activities related to identification, prevention and combating actions which might threaten life and security of state officials. As of 2018, the SPPS is the main agency which has the capability to detect, prevent and counteract illegal activity against the government.

== Leadership ==
The SPPS Board is the management body of the SPPS, which approves concepts and adopts decisions on the most important issues of the service and determines the priority directions of subdivisions' activity.

== SPPS Chiefs ==
- Colonel Valeriu Andronic (1994–1997)
- Major General Vasile Draganel (1997–2001)
- Colonel Vasile Dragomir (2001–2002)
- Colonel Vladimir Priguza (2002–2003)
- Colonel Alexandru Ursachi (2003–2007)
- Major General Igor Bodorin (2007–present)

== See also ==
- President of Moldova
- Protection and Guard Service
- Information and Security Service of the Republic of Moldova
