= President of Moldova =

Head of state

President of the Republic of Moldova
- Președintele Republicii Moldova
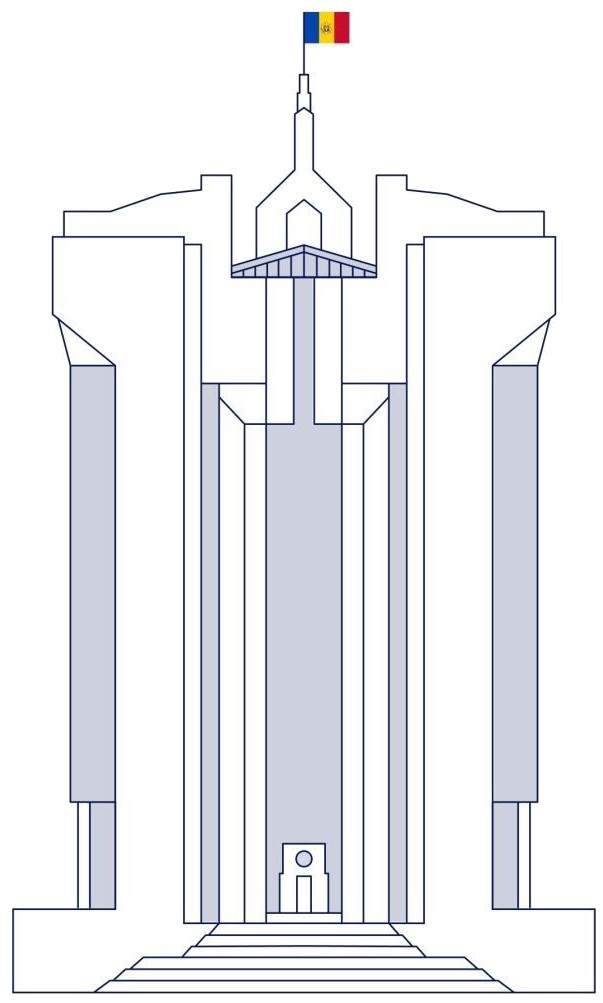
- Emblem of the Presidency of Moldova

- Presidential standard

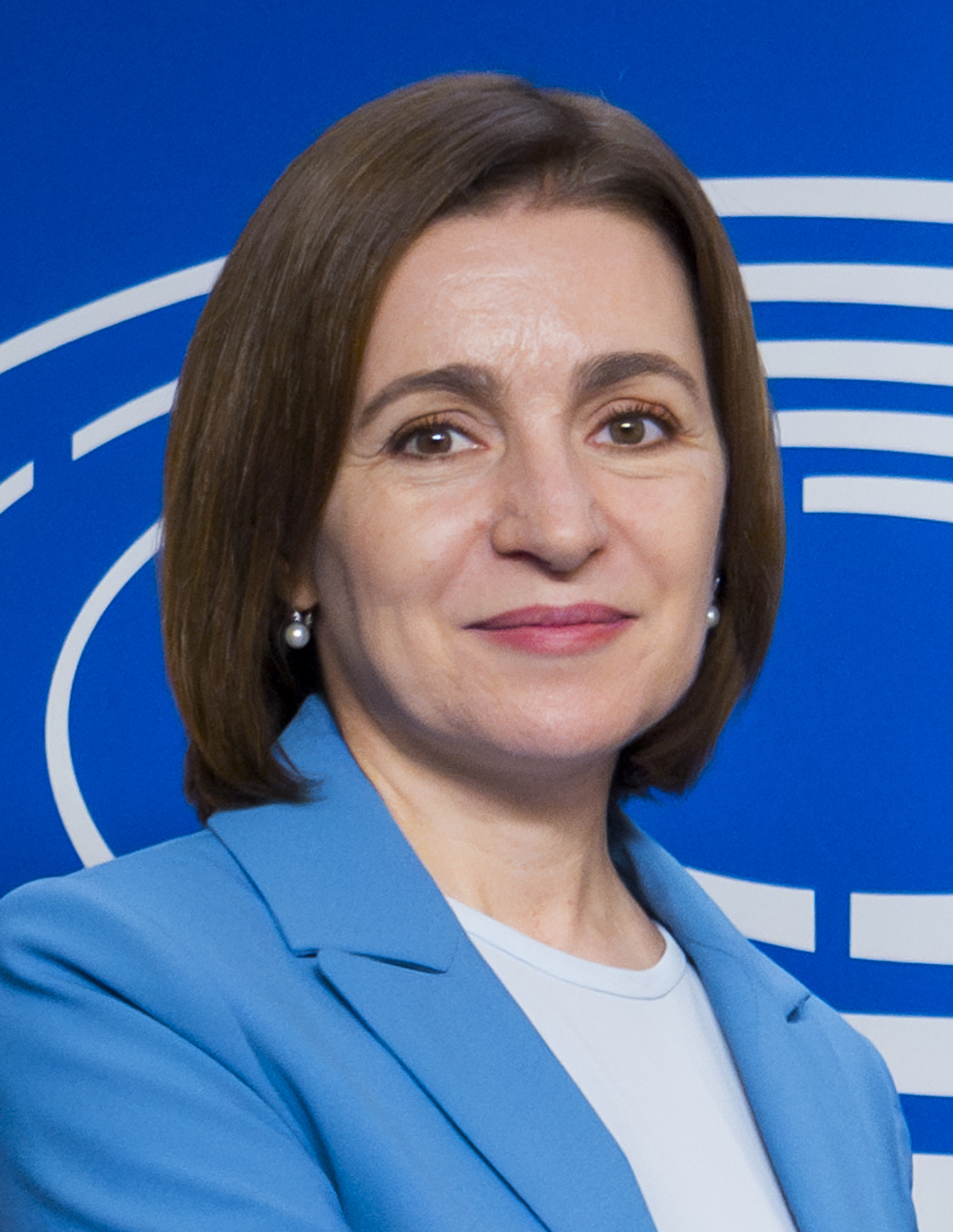
- Incumbent; Maia Sandu since 24 December 2020
- Executive branch of the Government of Moldova; Presidential Administration of Moldova
- Style: Madam President (informal); Her Excellency (diplomatic)
- Status: Head of state Commander-in-chief
- Member of: National Security Council
- Residence: Presidential Palace
- Seat: Chișinău
- Appointer: Popular vote
- Term length: Four years, renewable once consecutively
- Constituting instrument: Constitution of Moldova
- Inaugural holder: Mircea Snegur
- Formation: 3 September 1990; 36 years ago
- Deputy: President of the Parliament
- Salary: lei 244,931 (US$13,853.56) annual
- Website: presedinte.md

The president of the Republic of Moldova (Romanian: Președintele Republicii Moldova) is the head of state of Moldova. The current president is Maia Sandu, who assumed office on 24 December 2020.

== Duties and functions ==
The president "represents the State" and is "…the guarantor of national sovereignty and independence, as well as of the territorial unity and integrity of the State." In this capacity, the president ensures the continuity of the Moldovan state, arbitrates and mediates the regular functioning of public institutions, and upholds the rule of law. This role is in keeping with the president's solemn oath, taken at inauguration, "…to devote all my personal strength and abilities to the prosperity of the Republic of Moldova, to abide by the Constitution and the laws of the country, to defend democracy, fundamental human rights and freedoms, the sovereignty, independence, unity and territorial integrity of Moldova."

Moldova is a parliamentary republic wherein most of the president's powers are in practice ministerial, meaning they are exercised as stipulated by the Constitution, in accordance with the confidence of Parliament or, on the advice of the Government. The Moldovan presidency is thus a largely ceremonial institution. (Note: However, the underlying institutional framework has been reorienting (although not officially) towards a semi-presidential system over the course the presidency of Maia Sandu, whereby the president plays an important role in foreign affairs and sets the domestic agenda in consultation with the prime minister.) Nevertheless, because the president represents Moldova internationally, they have ultimate say over the country's foreign policy. In addition, the president can influence domestic policy by using their status to initiate and participate in public discourse. Perhaps most importantly, the president enjoys a broad suite of discretionary powers which they may use to protect the established constitutional order.

=== Ministerial powers ===
The president, in order to maintain the continuity and stability of the democratic process, summons a new Parliament not later than 30 days following a general election and nominates a candidate for the office of prime minister after consulting the leaders of the different political parties in Parliament. If Parliament gives its vote of confidence to the nominee and to the nominee's list of ministers, the president appoints the resulting prime minister-designate as prime minister and the other persons as ministers of the Government. Whenever the prime minister is incapacitated, including as a result of resignation or death in office, the president is likewise required to nominate another minister of the Government as acting prime minister. The acting prime minister is thereafter responsible for leading the Government until either a new prime minister is appointed or the incumbent prime minister's incapacitation ceases.

Government formation aside, the president promulgates the laws passed by Parliament. Moreover, the president performs other functions in matters of foreign relations and national defence. As it concerns foreign relations, the president accredits and recalls Moldovan ambassadors and envoys stationed in foreign states, receives the credentials of foreign diplomats to Moldova, and authorizes the opening, closure, or change in rank of diplomatic missions operating abroad. As commander-in-chief of the Armed Forces, the president may order general or partial mobilisations, repel armed aggression, declare a state of war, and take other due measures to safeguard public security and maintain public order. All of these functions are exercised on the advice of the Government and require for their validity the countersignature of the prime minister.

=== Discretionary powers ===
The president in their absolute discretion may:

1. Convene extraordinary sessions of Parliament.
2. Introduce legislation to Parliament. (Note: The right of legislative initiative is shared with all members of Parliament, the Government, and the People's Assembly of Gaugazia.)
3. Attend plenary sessions of Parliament and otherwise address Parliament at any time on any matter of national interest.
4. Dissolve Parliament and call snap elections.
5. Negotiate and conclude treaties on behalf of the Republic of Moldova and submit them, in accordance with the manner and terms established under the law, to Parliament for its ratification.
6. Award medals and titles of honour, supreme military ranks, and diplomatic ranks.
7. Settle questions of citizenship and grant political asylum.
8. Appoint public officers as provided by law.
9. Grant individual pardons.
10. Request Moldovan citizens express their will by way of referendum on matters of national interest.
11. Confer superior degrees of qualification to officers holding positions with the prosecuting bodies, courts of law and to other categories of civil servants, under the law.
12. Suspend Government ordinances and regulations which run contrary to primary legislation enacted by Parliament, unless and until the Constitutional Court rules on their legality.
13. Submit any law of which the president objects to Parliament for its reconsideration within two weeks of the law's passage. In the event Parliament abides by its previously passed decision, the president must promulgate the law.
14. Appoints judges on the nomination of the Superior Council of Magistracy.
15. Establish, organize, and appoint a Presidential Administration. The Presidential Administration is a collection of state agencies which reports to the president and serves as the president's support staff. The secretary-general of the Presidential Administration serves as the liaison between the president and the Government and administers the various presidential agencies subject to the president's direction and supervision. One such state agency, the Supreme Security Council, consults the president on foreign policy.
16. Exercise other discretionary powers as may be provided by law.

== Election ==
The president is elected in a two-round direct election, with a runoff taking place between the top two finishers if no candidate receives a majority in the first round. This system was put in place when the constitution of Moldova was adopted in 1994.

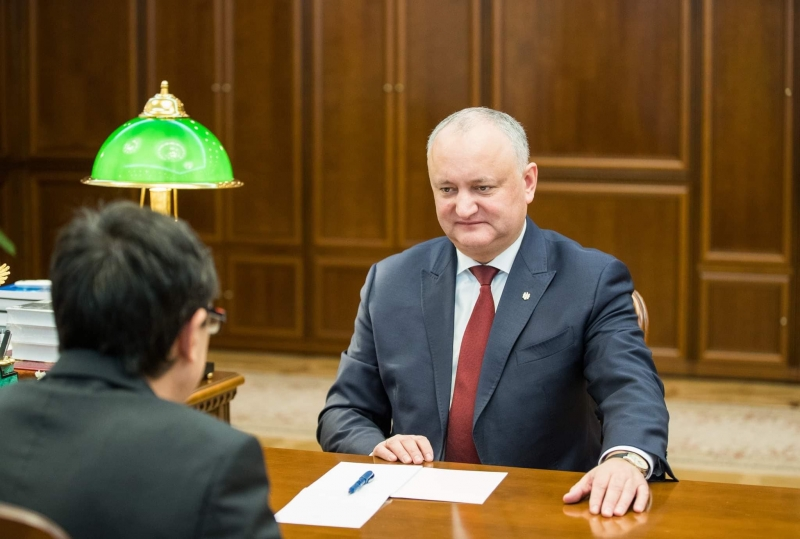
Igor Dodon receiving a briefing by National Bank governor Octavian Armașu, a typical presidential activity

In 2000, the Constitution was amended changing the process to an indirect election by the Parliament of Moldova, with a supermajority of 61 votes required. On March 4, 2016, the Constitutional Court ruled that the amendment was unconstitutional and Moldova consequently returned to electing the president via popular vote.

One presidential term lasts for four years; presidents are limited to two consecutive terms. Before the 2000 amendments, the presidential term lasted for five years.

Under Article 78 of the Constitution, candidates must be citizens of Moldova with the right to vote and over 40 years old who had lived or has been living permanently in Moldova for no less than 10 years and speaks the official state language. By convention, a newly elected president renounces formal ties with their political party before taking office.

== Constitutional position ==
According to the Article 77 of the Constitution of Moldova (1994), the president of Moldova is the head of the state and represents the state and is the guarantor of national sovereignty, independence, and the unity and territorial integrity of the nation.

=== Acting president ===
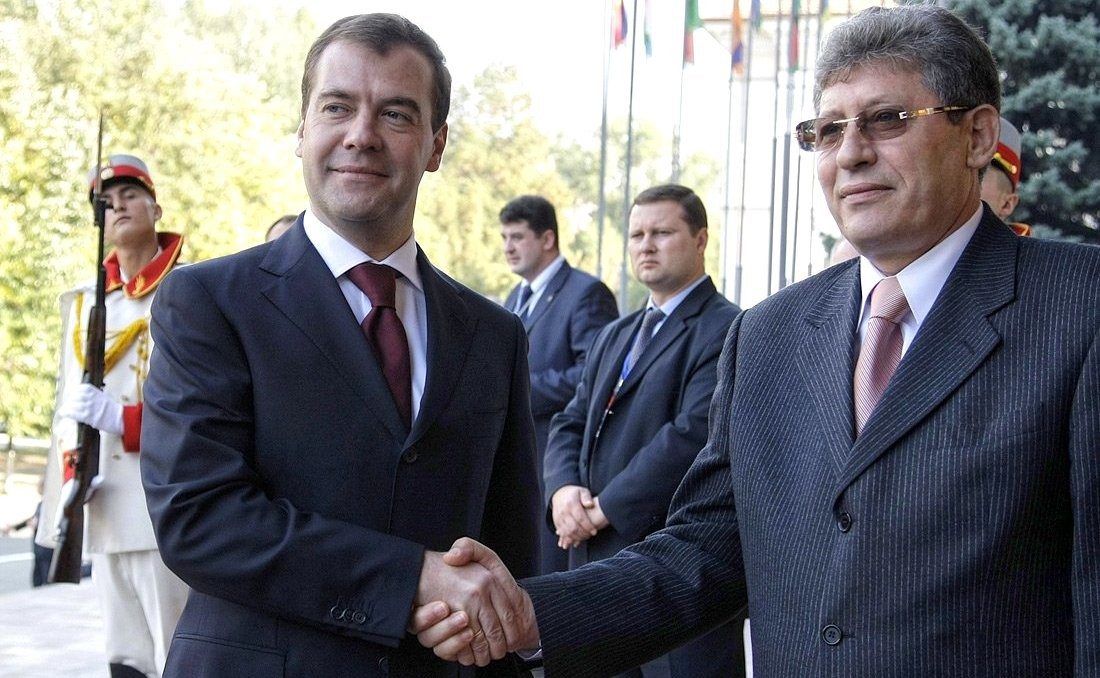
Mihai Ghimpu (right), the first acting president of Moldova, shaking hands with Russian president Dmitry Medvedev, 9 October 2009. A key role of the presidency is meetings with foreign leaders

The acting president of Moldova (Romanian: Președinte interimar al Republicii Moldova) is a person who fulfils the duties of the president of Moldova when cases of incapacity and vacancy occur. It is a temporary post provided by the Constitution of Moldova.

According to Article 91 of the Constitution of Moldova (1994):

When the office of the President of the Republic of Moldova becomes vacant or the President has been suspended from office, or finds himself in the temporary impossibility of discharging his duties, the responsibility of the office shall devolve ad interim on the President of Parliament or the Prime Minister, in that priority order.

=== Suspension from office ===
According to Article 89 of the Constitution of Moldova (1994):

- (1) In the event where the president of the Republic of Moldova commits grave offenses infringing upon constitutional provisions, he or she may be suspended from office by Parliament if two-thirds of the members cast their vote in support of suspension.
- (2) The motion requesting the suspension from office must be initiated by at least one third of the members, and it must be brought to the knowledge of the President without delay. The President may give explanations on the actions for which he or she is being censured before parliament.
- (3) If the motion requesting suspension from office meets with approval, a national referendum shall be organized within 30 days for removing the President from office.

=== Vacancy ===
According to Article 90 of the Constitution of Moldova (1994):

- (1) The office of the President of the Republic of Moldova may become vacant in consequence of expiry of the presidential mandate, resignation from office, removal from office, definite impossibility of executing his duties, or death.
- (2) The request to remove the President of the Republic of Moldova from office will be brought forward in Parliament, which will pass a decision on that request.
- (3) Within 3 months from the date when the presidential office was announced as vacant elections for a new president will be held in accordance with the law.

=== Standard ===
The presidential standard (Romanian: Stindardul Preşedintelui) consists of the Coat of Arms of Moldova in front of a purple background and a border composed of squares of 1/9 in the national colours of the republic. The regulations of the Standard of the President is approved by the decree of the President with the opinion of the National Heraldic Commission. The original of the Standard of the President is handed over to the President at the inauguration ceremony and is kept in their office. Duplicates and copies of the standard are displayed at the Presidential Palace or at other presidential residences while they are on these premises.

=== Band and music ===
The official march of the presidency is the Marș de Întîmpinare «La Mulți ani» (Slow March «To many years»), which is used during the arrival of the president at special occasions, similarly to Hail to the Chief for the president of the United States. The Presidential Band of the Republic of Moldova is the main military band of the Armed Forces of the Republic of Moldova and specifically serves the president during all functions of state. The band performs at welcome ceremonies of foreign officials on state visits, military parades, and the accreditation of ambassadors.

== Office of the President ==
- Lilia Tonu – Deputy Secretary General
- Veronica Mihailov-Moraru – Judicial Advisor
- Stella Jantuan – Advisor on Political Issues, Relations with Public Authorities and Civil Society
- Stanislav Secrieru – Defense and National Security Advisor; Secretary of the National Security Council
- Olga Roșca – Advisor on Foreign Policy and European Affairs
- Mihaela Fedoseev – Advisor on Inter-institutional Coordination and Organizational Processes
- Ion Mocanu – Advisor for Relations with Religious Denominations
- Nicu Popescu – Special Envoy for European Affairs and Strategic Partnerships
- Dorin Recean – Special Envoy for Development and Resilience

== List of presidents of Moldova ==
=== Moldavian Democratic Republic (1917–1918) ===
Party

Socialist Revolutionary Party

No.	Portrait	Name (Birth–Death)	Took office	Left office	Political party
1		Ion Inculeț (1884–1940)	15 December [O.S. 2 December] 1917	9 April [O.S. 27 March] 1918	Socialist Revolutionary Party

=== Moldavian Soviet Socialist Republic (1940–1991) ===
==== First secretaries of the Moldavian Communist Party ====
No.	Portrait	Name (Birth–Death)	Took office	Left office
1		Pyotr Borodin (1905–1986)	2 August 1940	11 February 1942
2		Nikita Salogor (1901–1982)	13 February 1942	5 January 1946
3		Nicolae Coval (1904–1970)	5 January 1946	26 July 1950
4		Leonid Brezhnev (1906–1982)	26 July 1950	25 October 1952
5		Dmitri Gladki (1911–1959)	25 October 1952	8 February 1954
6		Zinovie Serdiuk (1903–1982)	8 February 1954	29 May 1961
7		Ivan Bodiul (1918–2013)	29 May 1961	22 December 1980
8		Semion Grossu (born 1934)	22 December 1980	16 December 1989
9		Petru Lucinschi (born 1940)	16 November 1989	5 February 1991
10		Grigore Eremei (1935–2024)	5 February 1991	23 August 1991

==== Chairmen of the Supreme Soviet of SSR Moldova ====
Party

PCM

No.	Portrait	Name (Birth–Death)	Took office	Left office	Political party
1		Mircea Snegur (1940–2023)	27 April 1990	3 September 1990	Communist Party of Moldova

=== Republic of Moldova (1991–present) ===
Parties

PDAM PCRM PL PLDM PDM PSRM PAS Independent

Status

Acting President

No.	Portrait	Name (Birth–Death)	Term of office			Election	Political party	Prior office	Prime Minister
No.	Portrait	Name (Birth–Death)	Took office	Left office	Tenure	Election	Political party	Prior office	Prime Minister
1		Mircea Snegur (1940–2023)	3 September 1990	15 January 1997	6 years, 134 days	1991	Independent	Chairman of the Supreme Soviet of SSR Moldova	Mircea Druc; Valeriu Muravschi; Andrei Sangheli
2		Petru Lucinschi (born 1940)	15 January 1997	7 April 2001	4 years, 82 days	1996	Democratic Agrarian Party	President of the Parliament	Andrei Sangheli; Ion Ciubuc; Ion Sturza; Dumitru Braghiș
3		Vladimir Voronin (born 1941)	7 April 2001	11 September 2009	8 years, 157 days	2001 (indirect); 2005 (indirect)	Party of Communists	Minister of Internal Affairs of the Moldavian SSR	Dumitru Braghiș; Vasile Tarlev; Zinaida Greceanîi
–		Mihai Ghimpu (born 1951); Acting	11 September 2009	28 December 2010	1 year, 108 days	—	Liberal Party (Alliance for European Integration)	President of the Parliament	Zinaida Greceanîi; Vitalie Pîrlog (acting); Vlad Filat
–		Vlad Filat (born 1969); Acting	28 December 2010	30 December 2010	2 days	—	Liberal Democratic Party (Alliance for European Integration)	Prime Minister of Moldova	Vlad Filat
–		Marian Lupu (born 1966); Acting	30 December 2010	23 March 2012	1 year, 84 days	—	Democratic Party (Alliance for European Integration)	President of the Parliament	Vlad Filat
4		Nicolae Timofti (born 1948)	23 March 2012	23 December 2016	4 years, 275 days	2011–12 (indirect)	Independent (Alliance for European Integration)	President of the Superior Council of Magistrates	Vlad Filat; Iurie Leancă; Chiril Gaburici; Natalia Gherman (acting); Valeriu Streleț; Gheorghe Brega (acting); Pavel Filip
5		Igor Dodon (born 1975)	23 December 2016	24 December 2020	4 years, 1 day	2016	Party of Socialists	First Deputy Prime Minister, Minister of Economy and Trade	Pavel Filip; Maia Sandu; Ion Chicu
6		Maia Sandu (born 1972)	24 December 2020	Incumbent	5 years, 266 days	2020; 2024	Party of Action and Solidarity	Prime Minister of Moldova	Ion Chicu; Aureliu Ciocoi (acting); Natalia Gavrilița; Dorin Recean; Alexandru Munteanu; Eugen Osmochescu (acting) Vasile Tofan

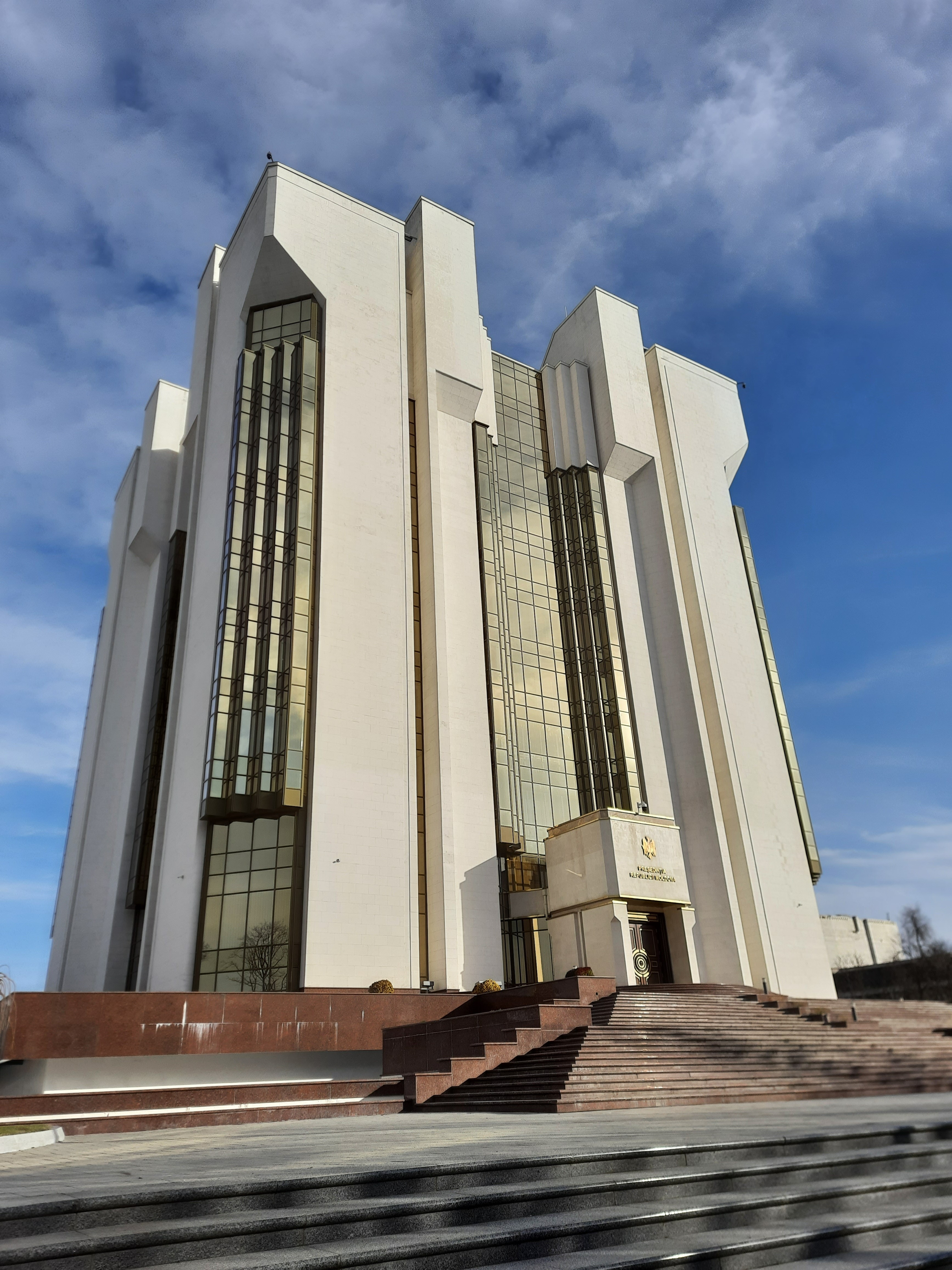
Official residence on Stephen the Great Boulevard.

== Residence ==
The Presidential Palace is located in the Buiucani sector of Chișinău. It was constructed between 1984 and 1987 to the design of architects A. Zalțman and V. Iavorski. The distinctive building was originally the meeting place of the Supreme Soviet of the Moldavian SSR.

== See also ==
- President of Transnistria
