= IMI-NOVA International Institute of Management =

- Institutul Internațional de Management „IMI-NOVA”
- Type: Moldovan Private Higher Educational Institution
- Established: 2005
- Rector: Valentin Răilean
- Administrative staff: 34
- Students: ca 1,800
- Address: 9 Hristo Botev Street, Chișinău, Moldova
- Website: www.imi-nova.md

The IMI-NOVA International Institute of Management (Romanian: Institutul Internațional de Management „IMI-NOVA”) is an educational institution located in Chișinău, Moldova.

== History ==
IMI Nova – was established by the Rector Valentin Railean on 25 April 1995 as a joint venture between some public and private institutions – three Moldovan academic institutions: the State University of Moldova, the Academy for the Economic Studies and the Academy of Sciences); two French Universities: the University of Grenoble Pierre Mendes and The University of Paris XI; and three companies: Bucuria SA, Victoria Bank and AFU Dresden.

== Campus and courses ==
The mission of the IMI-Nova International Management Institute is to educate professional managers for integration into the modern globalized economy. IMI's core activities include MBA Programs, Executive Education Programs, Consulting Services, a PhD in Business Administration Programs and research projects. It was the first such institutes in the post Soviet Union to offer a one-year MBA program based on a western European model and it has introduced the Bologna process and the European standard of Evaluation.

The main training areas are economics, business management and international business management. The academic year is divided in semesters with an obligation to sit for exams within the provided deadline dates. Courses are delivered in three main languages: Romanian, Russian and French, with some course modules in Italian and English.

The IMI uses their computer center as a tool in business research as well as preparing students for continued professional success. Using the internet is greatly encouraged and classes are designed stressing the global impacts of information technology. The institute has international agreements with universities in other countries including the University of Cassino and Southern Lazio, the University of Genova, the University of Insubria in Italy, the University of Cote d'Azur in France, the University NOVI of Amsterdam in the Netherlands. In particular there is a close link to the State University of Nice Sophia Antipolis in France which follows the Bologna process for the MBA which is delivered following the ECTS system standard.

== Staff ==
As of 2009 the Rector is Valentin Railean, the deputy rector for academic and administrative affairs is Corina Railean and from 2007 the deputy rector for international relations and European Integration is Alessandro Figus, he was Honoris Causa of the institute in 2005.
