= Sectorul Buiucani =

Coordinates: 47°02′16″N 28°48′48″E

Buiucani Sectorul Buiucani
- Administrative Sector
- Buiucani Sector
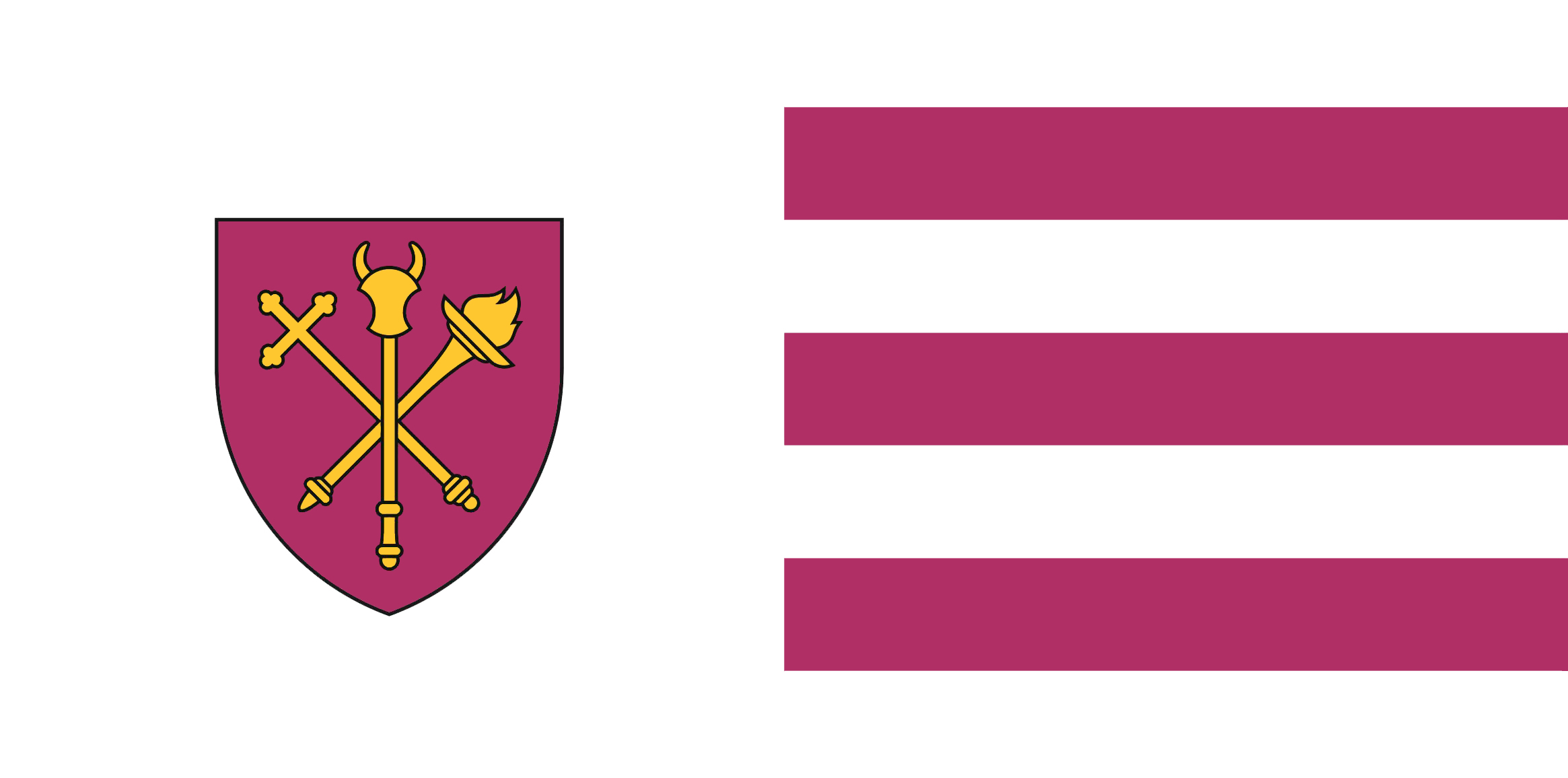
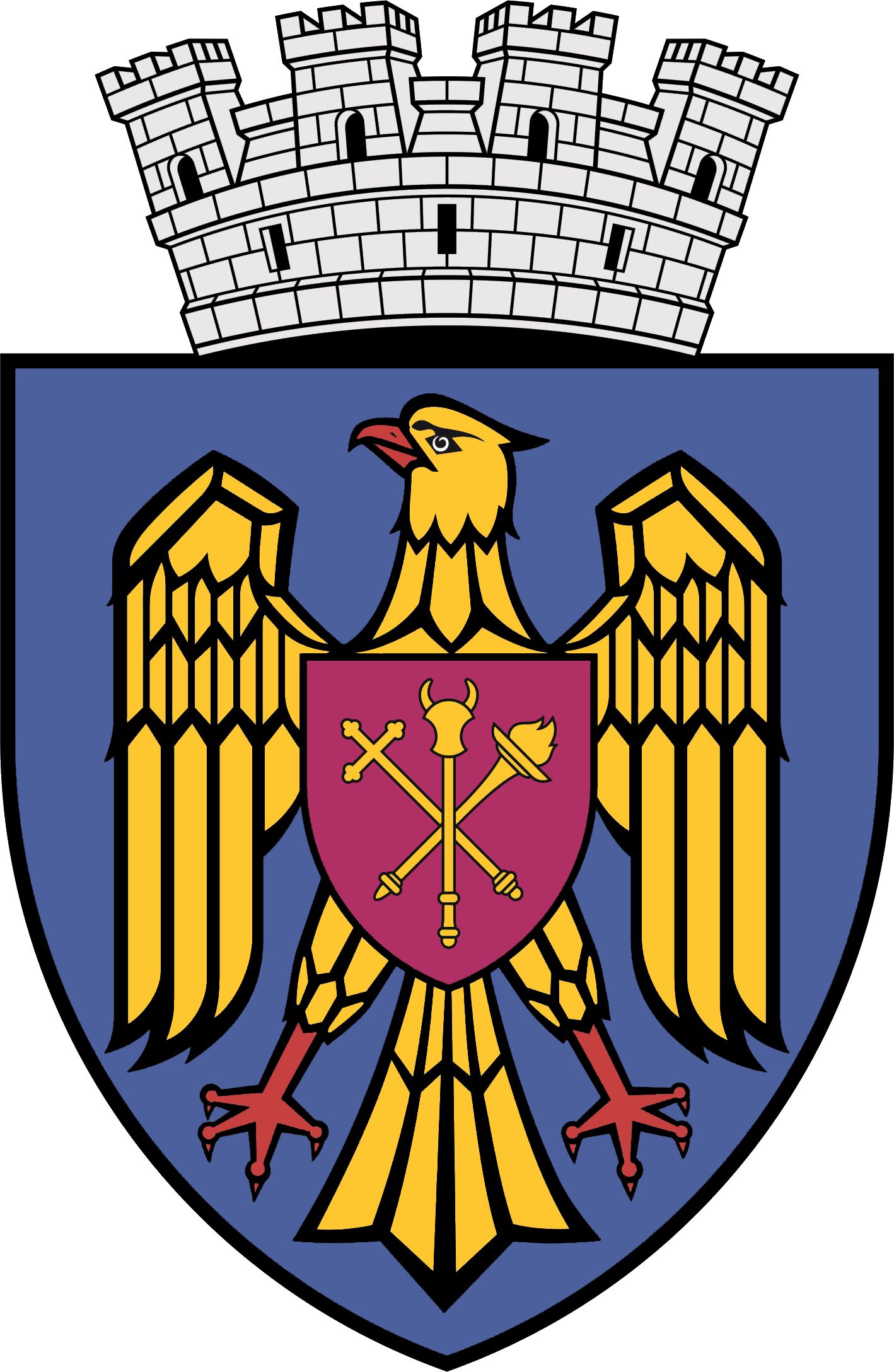
- Flag Coat of arms

- Founder: 1991

Government
  - Pretor: Vasile Moroi

Area
  - Total: 134 km^{2} (52 sq mi)

Population (2013)
  - Total: 112.100
- Demonym: Buiucani
- Time zone: UTC+3 (EET)
  - Summer (DST): EEST
- Website: https://preturabuiucani.md

Sectorul Buiucani (Romanian pronunciation: [bu-iu-ka-ni]) is one of the five sectors in Chişinău, the capital of Moldova, and the most affluent. The [local] administration is managed by a pretor appointed by the city administration. It governs over a portion of the city of Chişinău itself (the northwestern part), the cities/towns of Durleşti and Vatra, and the communes of Condriţa, Ghidighici, and Truşeni. It is largely populated by Moldovans.

The largest Jewish cemetery in Moldova is in Buiucani, it was listed as a national monument in 2012. The cemetery hosts an abandoned synagogue that was destroyed by the Nazis during the Holocaust. Buiucani is also home to a large indoor market, on Ion Creangă street which sells clothes and other goods at low prices. On Ion Pelivan street there is a school and a center for refugees from various conflicts. There are also several parks Alunelul, Dendrarium, and Valea Morilor in the area and easy access to the rest of Chisinau, for example, Trolleybus nr. 22 can go to the city center and Botanica.

Located largely in the central area of Chisinau, the Buiucani sector has numerous historical monuments, it is a well-known center of culture and history, with theaters, museums, educational institutions of all degrees. In the sector are located the most important state institutions and most of the headquarters of diplomatic missions accredited in the Republic of Moldova.

With over 20,000 businesses, the Buiucani Sector constitutes a significant economic potential in the city and in the country. Televisions, tractors, domestic and export furniture, footwear, tap wine, candies, books, a wide range of other consumer goods are produced here. The parks, leisure and entertainment areas, the arboretum, the astronomical observatory, the few bookstores and reference libraries give a certain specificity to the sector.

== See also ==
- Durleşti
- Vatra
- Condriţa
- Ghidighici
- Truşeni
- Chisinau
