= Condrița =

- Village
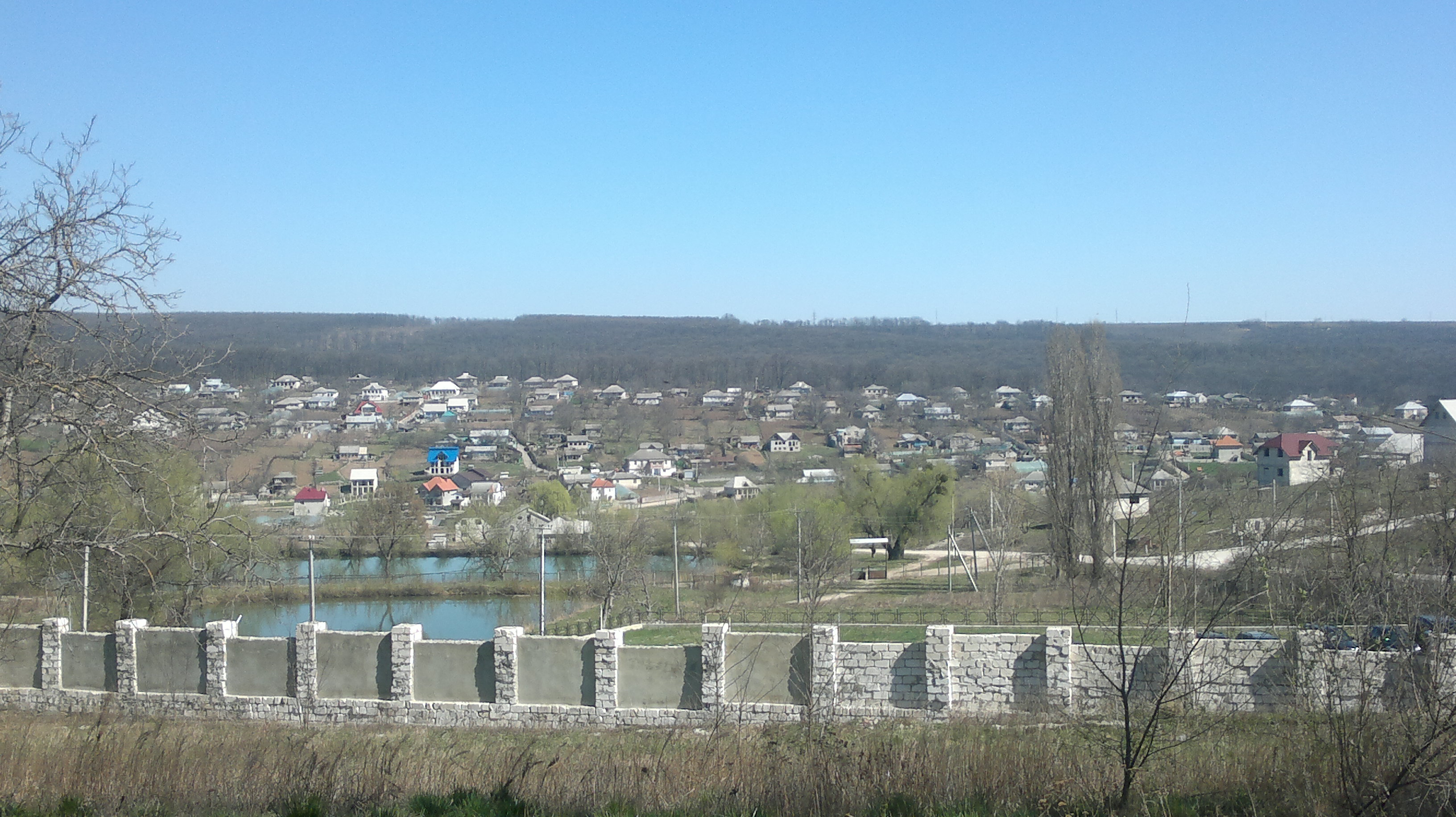

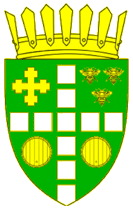
- Coat of arms
- Interactive map of Condrița
- Location in Moldova
- Coordinates: 47°03′N 28°34′E
- Country: Moldova
- Municipality: Chișinău Municipality

Government
  - Mayor: Alexei Boșneaga (PLDM)

Population (2024 census)
  - Total: 547
- Time zone: UTC+2 (EET)
  - Summer (DST): UTC+3 (EEST)
- Postal code: MD-2083
- Area code: +373 22

Condrița is a village in Chișinău Municipality, Moldova.

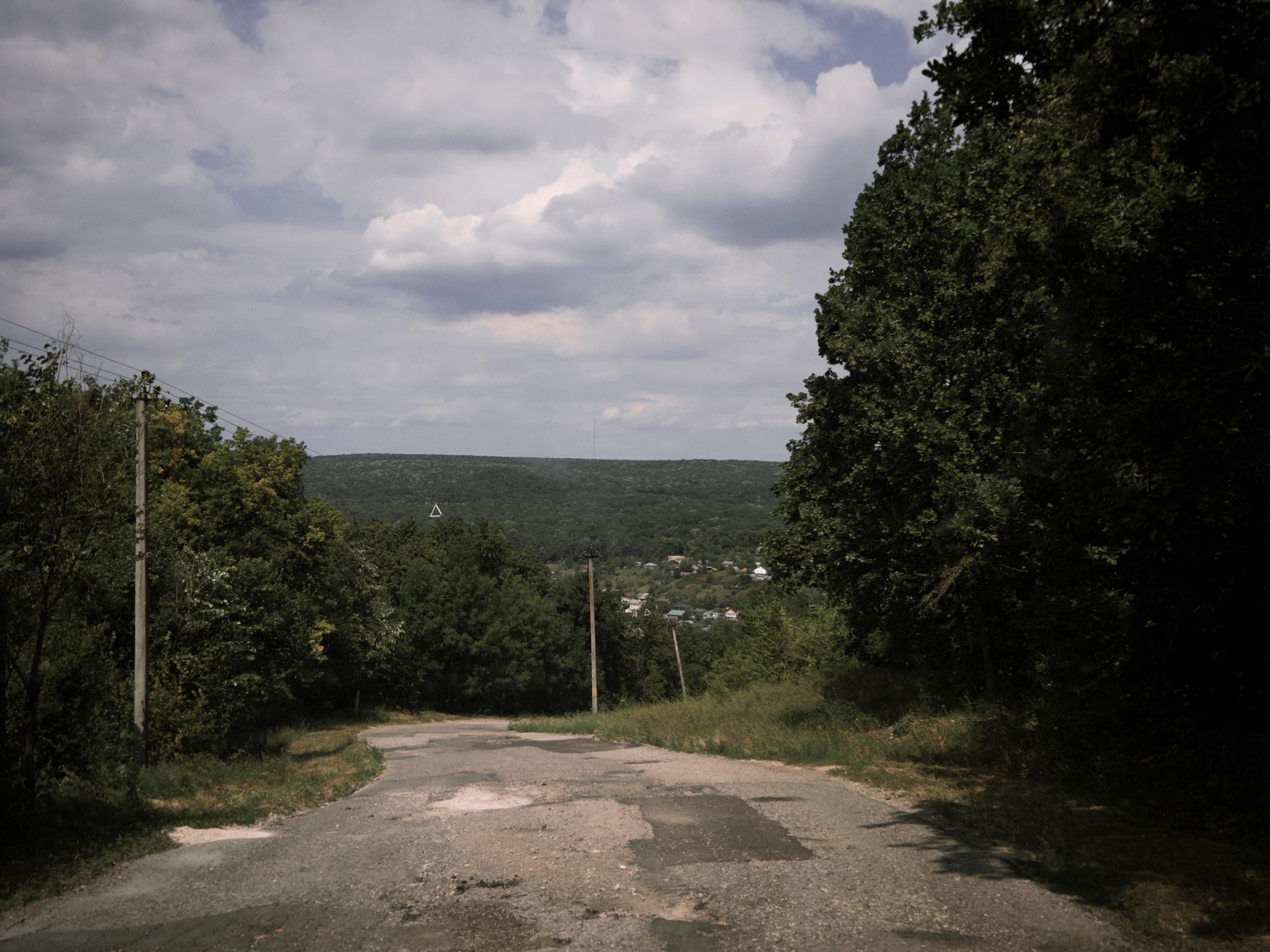
Entering Condrița from the M1 highway.

Condrița Monastery of St Nicholas is an Orthodox monastery of monks, founded by the eighteenth century. Although its foundation is sometimes claimed to dates as early as 1616, the earliest documentary evidence suggests a foundation around 1783.

The site includes monastic cells and two churches, one dedicated to Saint Nicholas, the other (which includes a large crypt) to the Dormition of the Mother of God. Originally dependent upon Căpriana monastery as its mother house, it gained independence in 1918. It was closed in the communist era, but reopened in 1993.
