= Next Moldovan parliamentary election =

- By 2029
- All 101 seats in Parliament; 51 seats needed for a majority
Party	Leader	Current seats
PAS	Igor Grosu	55
PSRM	Igor Dodon	17
PCRM	Diana Caraman	8
Alternative	Ion Ceban	7
PN	Renato Usatîi	6
PPDA	Vasile Costiuc	6
PVM	Vasile Tarlev	1
PAC–CC	Mark Tkachuk	1
Incumbent Prime Minister
Vasile Tofan; Independent

The next parliamentary elections in Moldova are to be held by 2029.

== Electoral system ==
The 101 members of the Parliament are elected by party-list proportional representation on a nationwide closed list. The electoral threshold at the national level varies according to the type of list; for parties or individual organizations it is 5%; for an electoral bloc it is 7%. For independent candidates, the threshold is 2%. Moldova is a parliamentary republic, with the Parliament having the main authority of creating laws and appointing the government and executive powers being primarily derived from the legislature.

== Parties and coalitions ==
Party	Parliamentary faction	Main ideology	Leader(s)	Faction leader	Current seats	Government
PAS		Liberalism	Igor Grosu	Mihai Popșoi	55	Majority government
PSRM		Left-conservatism; Democratic socialism	Igor Dodon		17	Opposition
PCRM		Left-conservatism; Communism	Diana Caraman		8	Opposition
MAN	Alternative	Social democracy	Ion Ceban	Gaik Vartanean	3	Opposition
PDCM	Alternative	Christian democracy	Ion Chicu	Gaik Vartanean	2	Opposition
Ind.	Alternative		Alexandr Stoianoglo	Gaik Vartanean	2	Opposition
PN		Left-wing populism Moldovenism	Renato Usatîi		6	Opposition
PPDA		Right-wing populism Moldovan–Romanian unionism	Vasile Costiuc		6	Opposition
PVM	Unaffiliated	Left-wing populism	Vasile Tarlev		1	Opposition
PAC–CC	Unaffiliated	Democratic socialism	Mark Tkachuk		1	Opposition

== Opinion polls ==
The following table shows opinion polls on the next parliamentary election taken since the 2025 election, as well as developments relevant in the context of the election that took place meanwhile involving the listed parties. The featured figures exclude poll respondents who were undecided, chose none or did not reply. A number in bold shows that the party surpassed the 5% threshold (7% for coalitions, 2% for independent candidates) to enter parliament. A smaller number shown below shows how many of the 101 seats in parliament the party would have taken. Explanatory notes are provided for extra necessary information.

Pollster	Fieldwork date	Sample size	PAS	PSRM	PCRM	PVM	PRIM	MAN	PDCM	PAC–CC	PN	PPDA	PSDE	CUB	LOC	Together	PNM	Others	Lead
Pollster	Fieldwork date	Sample size	PAS	PSRM	PCRM	PVM	PRIM	MAN	PDCM	PAC–CC	PN	PPDA	PSDE	CUB	LOC	PS	PNM	Others	Lead
IPP/ATES	25 Aug – 11 Sep 2026	1,116	**41.0**	**17.0**	**6.8**	0.1	0.6	4.6	2.0	–	**8.6**	**13.0**	0.8	–	0.8	–	0.6	4.1 (Note: Greater Moldova Party – 1.4, Dignity and Truth Platform – 0.6, Șor Party – 0.3)	24.0
ATES	27 May – 8 Jun 2026	1,004	**47.6**	**13.3**	4.1	0.4	2.0	4.7	2.1	0.3	**6.8**	**9.9**	1.0	–	0.4	0.6	–	6.8 (Note: Dignity and Truth Platform – 2.0, Șor Party – 1.0, Victory – 0.7, Greater Moldova Party – 0.3)	34.3
IMAS	1–14 June 2026	1,116	**38.0**	**19.9**	**5.9**	2.1	3.7	4.4	1.4	–	**7.1**	**13.6**	–	–	–	–	0.7	3.1 (Note: Greater Moldova Party – 1.7)	28.4
iData	May 2026	992	**47.1**	**18.7**	2.0	0.3	1.7	4.9	2.6	–	**5.8**	**9.0**	1.2	–	–	–	–	6.7 (Note: Independent candidates – 2.6)	28.4
	10 Apr 2026	**Alternative is dissolved.**																	
ATES	12–23 Mar 2026	1,078 Moldova + 235 diaspora	**55.6**	**10.4**	3.4	–	–	2.6	0.8	–	**6.8**	**9.3**	2.1	–	–	–	3.7	5.4 (Note: Dignity and Truth Platform – 1.0)	45.2
iData	Mar 2026	1,035	**48.2**	**21.1**	2.5	0.1	2.4	**7.3**	2.4	–	**7.2**	**5.1**	–	0.5	–	0.2	0.2	2.8 (Note: Greater Moldova Party – 0.8, independent candidates – 0.3)	27.1
IMAS	Feb 2026	1,113	**40.8**	**19.6**	**5.2**	2.1	3.3	**8.9**			**7.6**	**9.8**	0.4	0.2	0.4	–	0.4	1.3 (Note: Liberal Democratic Party of Moldova – 0.2)	21.2
IMAS	18 Nov – 4 Dec 2025	1,123	**43.0**	**18.6**	**5.2**	1.8	2.9	**8.6**			**8.7**	**8.7**	–	0.3	0.3	–	0.3	1.6	24.4
	22 Oct 2025	**Patriotic Electoral Bloc is dissolved.**																	
**2025 parliamentary election**	28 Sep 2025	1,578,722	**50.20**; 55	**24.20**; 26			– (Note: Part of Patriotic Electoral Bloc. Barred from 2025 election by Central Electoral Commission.)	**7.96**; 8			**6.20**; 6	**5.62**; 6	0.95; 0	0.84; 0	0.39; 0	0.32; 0	0.30; 0	3.02; 0	26.00
