= Zurab Todua =

Moldovan politician

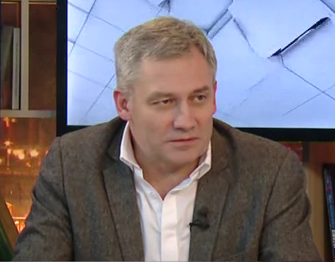
- Todua in 2015

Member of the Moldovan Parliament
- In office 24 December 2010 – 9 December 2014
- Parliamentary group: Party of Communists

Personal details
- Born: 25 December 1963 (age 62) Șoldănești, Moldavian SSR, Soviet Union
- Party: Collective Action Party – Civic Congress
- Other political affiliations: Party of Communists
- Parent: Djumberi Todua (father)
- Education: State University of Moldova
- Occupation: Historian, politician, politologue, publicist, writer

Zurab Todua (Russian: Зураб Джумберович Тодуа; born 25 December 1963) is a Moldovan historian, politician, politologue, publicist and writer, who served as deputy in the Parliament of Moldova between 2010 and 2014.

Since 1991 Todua has researched political, social-economical, inter-ethnic and religious problems in post-soviet space (CIS), being specialised on the conflict regions and zones, and on religious extremism. Todua is well known in Russian-language area, and often is presented as a 'Russian' politologue.

Todua was born in Șoldănești, then part of the Moldavian SSR within the Soviet Union, to a Georgian father and a Moldovan mother. His father, Djumberi Todua, as well is a communist politician who served as deputy in Moldovan Parliament in 2001–2005.

In 1990s, Todua worked as special correspondent, then observer for Russian newspapers "Панорама" (Panorama), "Россия" (Rossiya), and "Новая газета" (Novaya gazeta).

He wrote the following books: «Новая Чечено-Ингушетия» (1992), «Азербайджан сегодня» (1995), «Поединок на азиатском ковре» (1999), «Узбекистан между прошлым и будущим» (2000), «Азербайджанский пасьянс» (2001), «Экспансия исламистов на Кавказе и в Центральной Азии» (2006), «Молдавия и молдавские коммунисты. Политическая хроника переломной эпохи 1988 – 2008» (2009), «Провал «Альянса за Евро» (2010).

In February 2017, journalist Oleg Brega spotted Todua in Bucharest at the Romanian anti-corruption protests.

In 2019 he joined the Collective Action Party – Civic Congress, founded by Mark Tkaciuk and Iurie Muntean. He is a member of the executive committee of the party.
