= Angela Cutasevici =

Moldovan educator (born 1972)

Angela Cutasevici MP
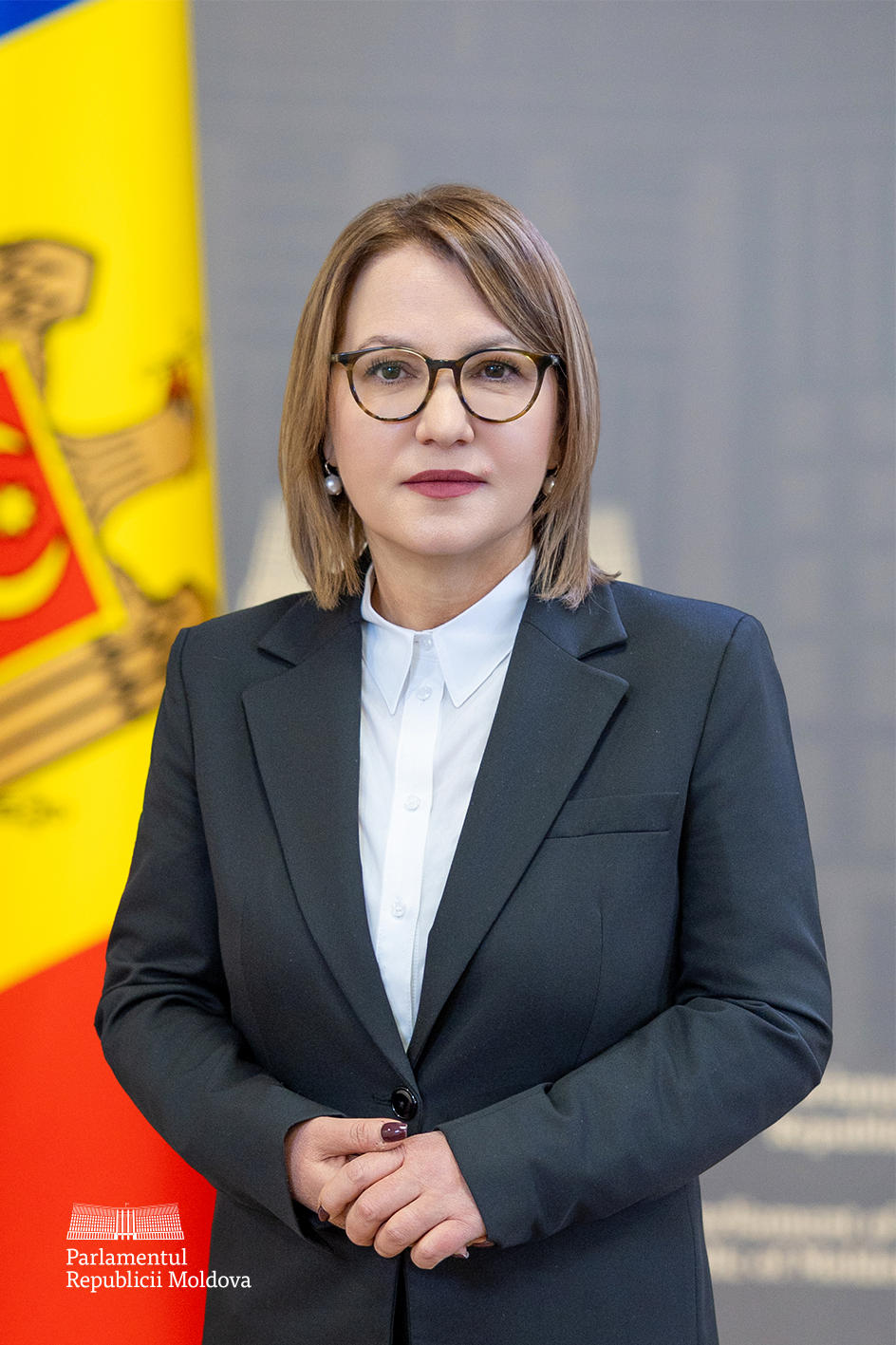
- Official portrait, 2025

Member of the Moldovan Parliament
- Incumbent
- Assumed office 24 November 2025
- Preceded by: Ion Ceban
- Parliamentary group: Alternative Bloc

Deputy Mayor of Chișinău
- In office 27 November 2019 – 24 November 2025
- Preceded by: Ruslan Codreanu
- Succeeded by: Victor Pruteanu

Secretary of State of the Ministry of Education, Culture and Research
- In office 20 December 2017 – 21 August 2019
- President: Igor Dodon
- Prime Minister: Pavel Filip; Maia Sandu
- Minister: Monica Babuc; Liliana Nicolaescu-Onofrei

Personal details
- Born: 27 September 1972 (age 53) Vadul lui Vodă, Moldavian SSR, Soviet Union
- Party: National Alternative Movement
- Education: Ion Creangă State Pedagogical University of Chișinău

Angela Cutasevici (born 27 September 1972) is a Moldovan historian and educator. She was sworn in as member of the Parliament of Moldova on November 24, 2025.
