= Veronica Abramciuc =

Moldovan politician (born 1958)

Member of the Moldovan Parliament
- In office 22 April 2009 – 9 December 2014
- Parliamentary group: Party of Communists; Party of Socialists

Co-President of the Party of Socialists
- In office 29 June 1997 – 18 December 2011 Serving with: Eduard Smirnov
- Succeeded by: Igor Dodon

Personal details
- Born: 5 March 1958 (age 68) Petrușeni, Moldavian SSR, Soviet Union
- Party: PSRM (since 1997)
- Other political affiliations: PSM (1992-1997)

Veronica Abramciuc (born 5 March 1958 in Petrușeni, Rîșcani District) is a Moldovan politician. She was previously Member of the Moldovan Parliament in three consecutive legislatures (2009–2014), having been elected on the lists of the Party of Communists of the Republic of Moldova.

On 4 November 2011, Abramciuc, together with Igor Dodon and Zinaida Greceanîi, left the PCRM parliamentary faction, forming the “Group of Non-Affiliated Deputies.” They subsequently joined the Party of Socialists of the Republic of Moldova. Abramciuc later became honorary president of the Party of Socialists. On 4 June 2013, she and her husband, Valentin Crîlov, were expelled from the party leadership for actions alleged to have been detrimental to the socialist movement.

She is married to Valentin Crîlov, also a politician and former member of parliament. They have no children. According to her curriculum vitae, Abramciuc’s native language is Moldovan; she also speaks Russian, French, and Portuguese.
