= Zubrești =

- Village
- Location within Moldova
- Coordinates: 47.2405555556°N 28.5341666667°E
- Country: Moldova
- District: Strășeni District

Government
  - Mayor: Maria Manoli (PAS)

Population (2014 census)
  - Total: 2,865
- Time zone: UTC+2 (EET)
  - Summer (DST): UTC+3 (EEST)

Zubrești is a village in Strășeni District, Moldova.

== Demographics ==
According to the 2014 Moldovan census, Zubrești had a population of 2,865 residents. The village covers an area of 23.4 km², giving it a population density of approximately 122.4 inhabitants per square kilometer as of 2014. Between 2004 and 2014, Zubrești experienced a slight population decline of 1.1%.

The gender distribution was nearly equal, with 1,431 males (49.9%) and 1,434 females (50.1%). Regarding age structure, 18.6% of residents were children aged 0–14, 71.2% were of working age (15–64), and 10.2% were aged 65 and over.

The entire population lived in rural areas. Most residents (98.4%) were born in Moldova, with small numbers born in the European Union (0.8%) and the Commonwealth of Independent States (0.8%).

Ethnically, the population was predominantly Moldovan (93.0%), followed by Romanians (6.5%) and a small Russian minority (0.2%). Moldovan was the most commonly reported native language (60.9%), while a significant portion (38.3%) reported Romanian, and small numbers reported Russian (0.3%) or another language (0.3%). The overwhelming majority of the population (98.8%) identified as Orthodox.

== Administration and local government ==
Zubrești is governed by a local council composed of thirteen members. The most recent local elections, in November 2023, resulted in the following composition: 11 councillors from the Party of Action and Solidarity, 1 councillor from the Party of Development and Consolidation of Moldova, and Ludmila Sîrghi who ran independently. The European Social Democratic Party, the Party of Socialists of the Republic of Moldova, and the Liberal Democratic Party of Moldova also ran, but did not receive enough votes to select councillors. In the same elections, the candidate from the Party of Action and Solidarity, Maria Manoli, was elected as mayor with a 87.5% majority of the vote.
