= 2019 Moldovan local elections =

Local elections were held in Moldova on 20 October 2019, with a runoff for mayors held two weeks later.

== Legal context ==
According to Article 119 of the "Electoral Code" of Moldova, local elected representatives are elected "for a four year term, which begins from the date of conducting local general elections". The previous local election was held in 2015. The next local elections were held in 2023.

== Results ==
Party	District and municipal councils			Town and village councils			Mayoral		
Party	Votes	%	Seats	Votes	%	Seats	Votes	%	Seats
Party of Socialists of the Republic of Moldova	291,257	27.08	326	227,875	24.66	2,986	–	–	206
NOW Platform DA and PAS	253,010	23.53	263	196,887	21.31	2,413	–	–	172
Democratic Party of Moldova	177,811	16.53	238	187,310	20.27	2,646	–	–	261
Șor Party	72,256	6.72	72	58,440	6.32	516	–	–	43
Liberal Democratic Party of Moldova	55,275	5.14	66	46,824	5.07	547	–	–	48
Our Party	48,772	4.54	51	27,997	3.03	248	–	–	24
Party of Communists of the Republic of Moldova	40,591	3.77	43	28,487	3.08	247	–	–	10
Liberal Party	21,712	2.02	4	8,558	0.93	68	–	–	2
National Unity Party	16,120	1.50	9	9,489	1.03	77	–	–	7
Save Bessarabia Union	6,804	0.63	3	6,844	0.74	61	–	–	4
Christian-Social Union of Moldova	5,809	0.54	2	1,394	0.15	10	–	–	1
European People's Party of Moldova	4,872	0.45	4	3,885	0.42	39	–	–	2
Romanian Popular Party	4,535	0.42	1	2,738	0.30	17	–	–	1
"People's Will" Party	4,134	0.38	–	2,749	0.30	18	–	–	1
Democracy at Home Party	3,003	0.28	–	1,668	0.18	12	–	–	2
National Liberal Party	2,339	0.22	–	1,701	0.18	12	–	–	–
Ecologist Green Party	2,248	0.21	1	1,980	0.21	19	–	–	1
Alliance of Liberals and Democrats for Europe	907	0.08	1	1,129	0.12	10	–	–	–
"Speranța-Nadejda" Professionals Movement	561	0.05	–	91	0.01	2	–	–	1
Party of the "European Left"	469	0.04	–	72	0.01	–	–	–	–
Socialist Party of Moldova	392	0.04	–	–	–	–	–	–	–
Working People's Party	211	0.02	–	64	0.01	–	–	–	–
Party of Law and Justice	201	0.02	–	68	0.01	–	–	–	–
Anti-Mafia Popular Movement Party	195	0.02	–	205	0.02	–	–	–	–
People's Party of the Republic of Moldova	176	0.02	–	415	0.04	2	–	–	–
"Patriots of Moldova" Party	–	–	–	1,404	0.15	9	–	–	–
Russian-Slavic Party of Moldova	–	–	–	437	0.05	3	–	–	–
Independents	61,786	5.75	24	105,310	11.40	510	–	–	112
Valid votes	1,075,446	96.37	–	924,021	96.05	–	1,200,272	97.76	–
Invalid/blank votes	40,493	3.63	–	37,982	3.95	–	27,549	2.24	–
Total votes	1,115,939	100.00	1,108	962,003	100.00	10,472	1,227,821	100.00	898
Registered voters/turnout	2,687,113	41.53	–	2,203,300	43.66	–	2,945,345	41.69	–
Source: alegeri.md

=== The district and municipal councils, after administrative-territorial unit ===
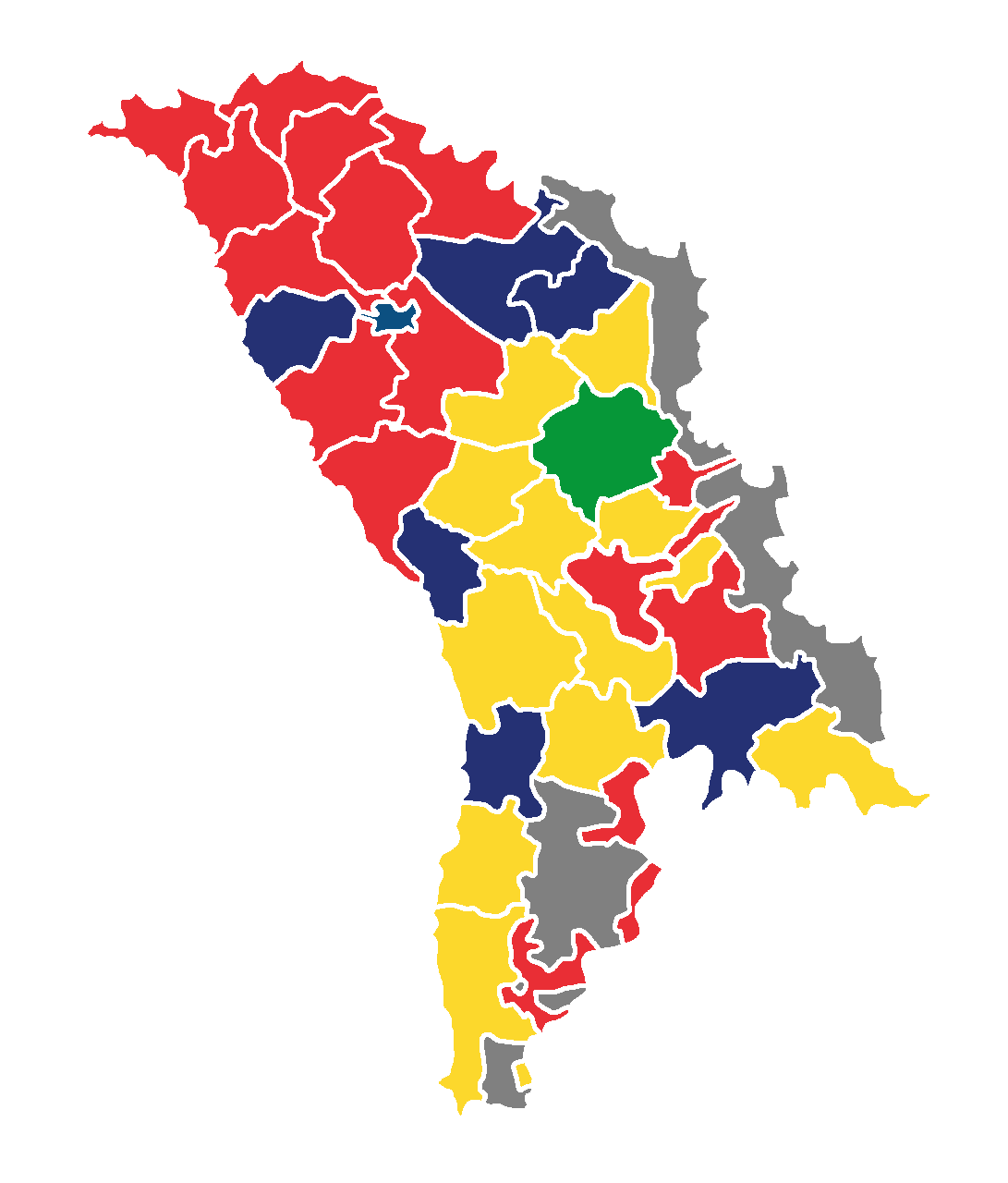
Winning parties in each administrative division.

#	Administrative- territorial unit	PSRM	ACUM	PDM	ȘOR	PN	PLDM	PCRM	PL	PUN
1	Mun. Chișinău	37.60%	33.30%	3.97%	3.85%	1.28%	0.85%	1.69%	6.35%	2.78%
2	Mun. Bălți	16.21%	9.08%	2.27%	4.54%	52.37%	–	1.85%	–	3.19%
3	Anenii Noi	27.66%	22.88%	23.57%	5.47%	2.53%	7.70%	4.14%	–	–
4	Basarabeasca	23.47%	14.60%	11.10%	4.06%	3.14%	8.65%	2.70%	–	–
5	Briceni	48.53%	8.74%	19.00%	5.30%	3.88%	–	5.87%	0.87%	–
6	Cahul	24.97%	33.86%	19.38%	3.37%	3.10%	3.72%	3.87%	1.02%	–
7	Cantemir	27.75%	31.20%	16.06%	3.68%	6.67%	5.46%	2.58%	3.04%	–
8	Călărași	23.63%	27.00%	15.69%	5.72%	–	5.19%	1.72%	–	4.39%
9	Căușeni	18.59%	17.92%	20.31%	4.02%	0.66%	15.61%	10.13%	1.02%	–
10	Cimișlia	17.08%	25.71%	18.04%	5.99%	1.09%	5.31%	3.75%	–	–
11	Criuleni	16.66%	29.37%	16.14%	4.18%	–	7.94%	5.94%	1.47%	6.52%
12	Dondușeni	53.68%	12.04%	10.75%	4.82%	8.72%	7.40%	–	–	–
13	Drochia	28.66%	16.88%	13.06%	5.91%	11.92%	2.76%	6.55%	0.88%	0.93%
14	Dubăsari	36.28%	15.98%	14.00%	5.17%	–	2.72%	6.68%	1.36%	–
15	Edineț	35.22%	11.74%	19.88%	7.34%	5.74%	12.00%	3.96%	–	1.07%
16	Fălești	25.34%	17.82%	19.64%	5.71%	15.21%	3.43%	4.96%	1.13%	–
17	Florești	28.70%	15.58%	33.59%	4.82%	2.52%	3.23%	4.31%	–	–
18	Glodeni	21.29%	14.29%	28.27%	9.69%	15.52%	5.79%	3.29%	1.86%	–
19	Hîncești	17.83%	29.61%	25.37%	2.95%	–	4.44%	–	1.98%	–
20	Ialoveni	9.58%	40.51%	21.78%	2.62%	–	7.95%	2.98%	1.86%	2.05%
21	Leova	22.16%	24.27%	26.09%	4.80%	5.84%	13.20%	3.64%	–	–
22	Nisporeni	7.88%	22.72%	49.91%	–	–	3.73%	2.91%	0.89%	3.06%
23	Ocnița	52.09%	14.68%	9.55%	6.12%	3.78%	2.10%	11.67%	–	–
24	Orhei	8.33%	13.50%	8.01%	52.01%	1.05%	2.35%	1.12%	1.79%	1.06%
25	Rezina	23.76%	25.69%	20.31%	5.97%	1.75%	4.73%	5.61%	–	–
26	Rîșcani	34.30%	14.36%	22.02%	4.50%	9.16%	4.76%	4.32%	1.50%	1.43%
27	Sîngerei	28.00%	18.63%	17.58%	6.37%	–	10.62%	5.46%	–	3.32%
28	Soroca	31.96%	14.05%	24.72%	3.67%	1.23%	7.32%	5.71%	–	–
29	Strășeni	11.42%	27.95%	23.02%	3.09%	1.15%	19.83%	4.70%	2.48%	3.11%
30	Șoldănești	19.13%	18.19%	37.53%	6.80%	–	5.22%	4.04%	2.60%	–
31	Ștefan Vodă	23.84%	27.48%	22.72%	2.87%	2.39%	–	3.67%	–	–
32	Taraclia	57.34%	7.71%	6.35%	12.17%	–	–	11.65%	–	–
33	Telenești	12.39%	35.19%	17.22%	8.12%	–	17.57%	2.82%	1.67%	–
34	Ungheni	23.19%	18.94%	22.05%	5.13%	1.89%	5.09%	5.84%	–	3.22%
Source: CEC
