= Liliana Iaconi =

Moldovan economist (born 1972)

Liliana Iaconi MP
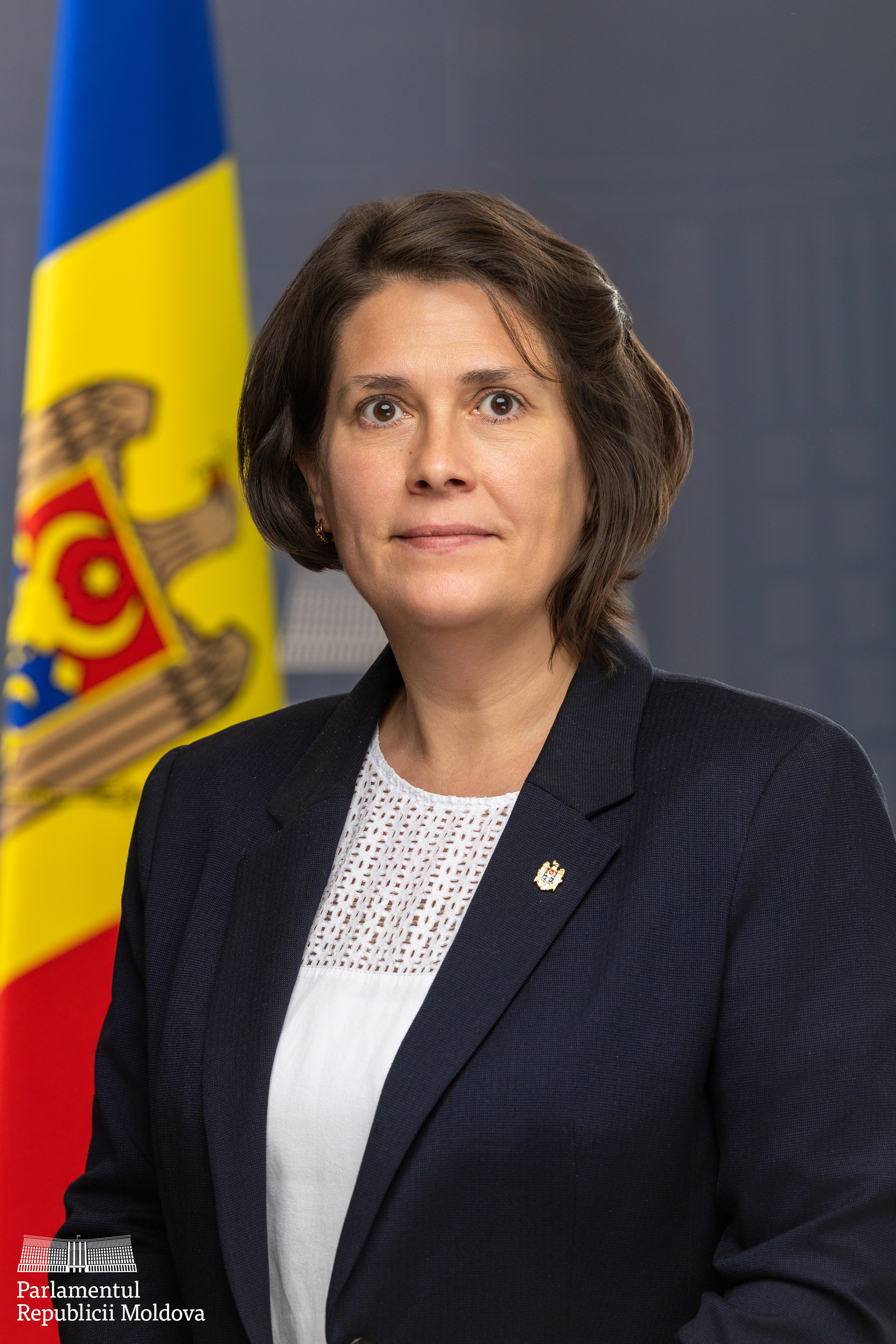
- Official portrait, 2025

Member of the Moldovan Parliament
- Incumbent
- Assumed office 22 October 2025
- Parliamentary group: Alternative Bloc

Secretary General of the Government of Moldova
- In office 1 April 2021 – 22 July 2021
- President: Maia Sandu
- Prime Minister: Aureliu Ciocoi (acting)
- Succeeded by: Dumitru Udrea
- In office 20 November 2019 – 22 December 2020
- President: Igor Dodon
- Prime Minister: Ion Chicu
- Preceded by: Andrei Spînu

Personal details
- Born: 1972 (age 53–54)
- Party: Party of Development and Consolidation of Moldova
- Education: Academy of Economic Studies of Moldova

Liliana Iaconi (born 1972) is a Moldovan economist who serves as Member of the Moldovan Parliament since October 2025.
