= Said-Muhmat Amaev =

Moldovan politician (born 1960)

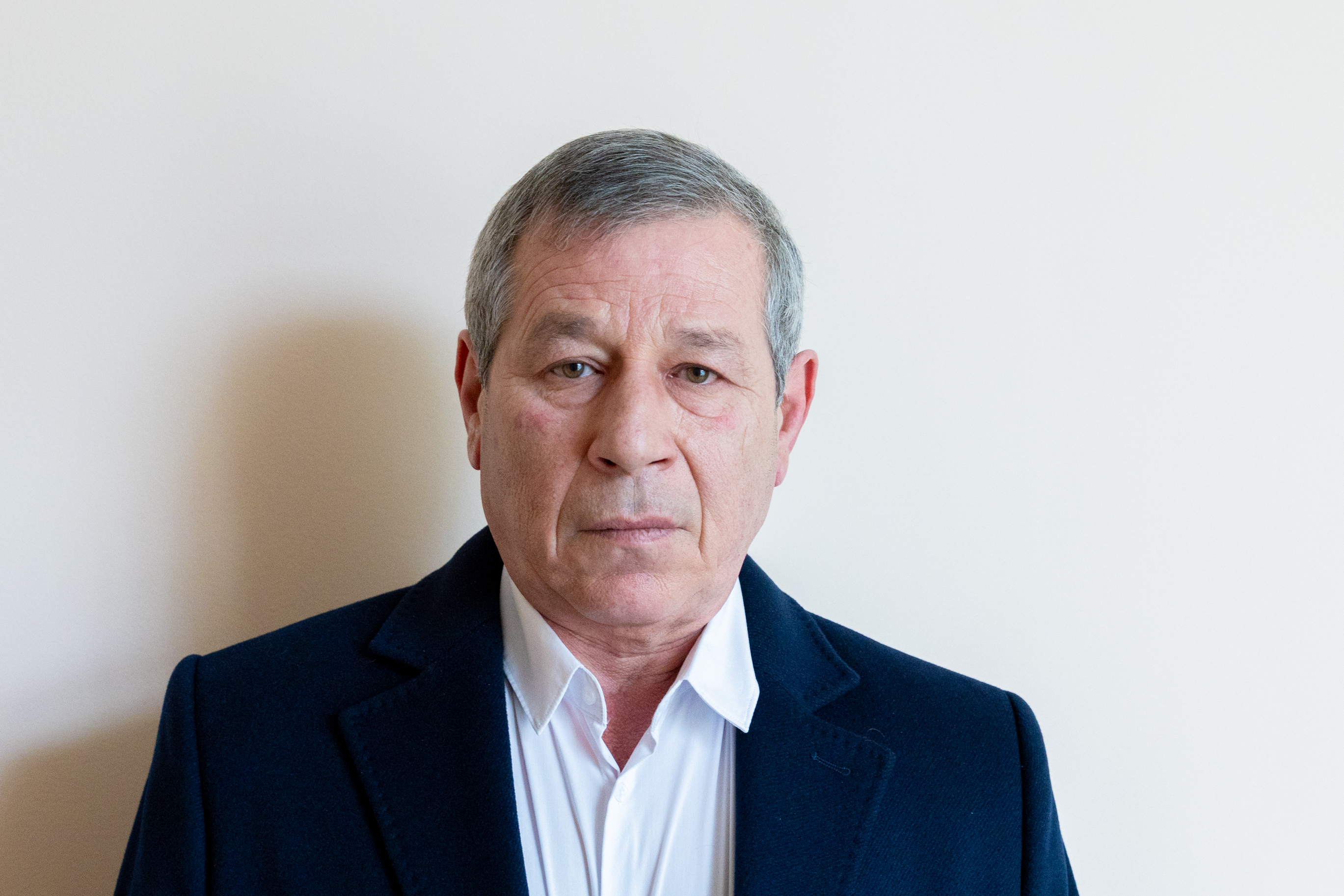
- Amaev in 2024

Member of the Moldovan Parliament
- In office 5 March 2024 – 16 October 2025
- Preceded by: Adrian Lebedinschi
- Parliamentary group: Bloc of Communists and Socialists

Personal details
- Born: August 30, 1960 (age 65) Checheno-Ingush ASSR, USSR
- Party: Party of Communists
- Education: Modern University for the Humanities
- Awards: Honorary citizen of Bălți Municipality (2020)

Said-Muhmat Amaev (born 30 August 1960) is a Moldovan politician, who served as a Member of the Moldovan Parliament.

== Early life and professional career ==
Said-Muhmat Amaev, a Chechen weightlifter, moved to Soviet Moldova in 1982, first in Chișinău, then in Bălți, where he started a family. He then studied law at the Modern University for the Humanities in Moscow, Russia. Since 2000 he is a sports teacher at the Specialized Sports School „Boris Petuhov” in Bălți.

Amaev speaks Chechen, Russian, Romanian and English.

== Political activity ==
A member of the Party of Communists of the Republic of Moldova, Amaev was a local councillor in Bălți from 2013 to 2015.

He has been a member of the Parliament of Moldova since 5 March 2024, replacing Adrian Lebedinschi.
