= Eduard Smirnov =

Moldovan politician (born 1939)

Eduard Smirnov OR
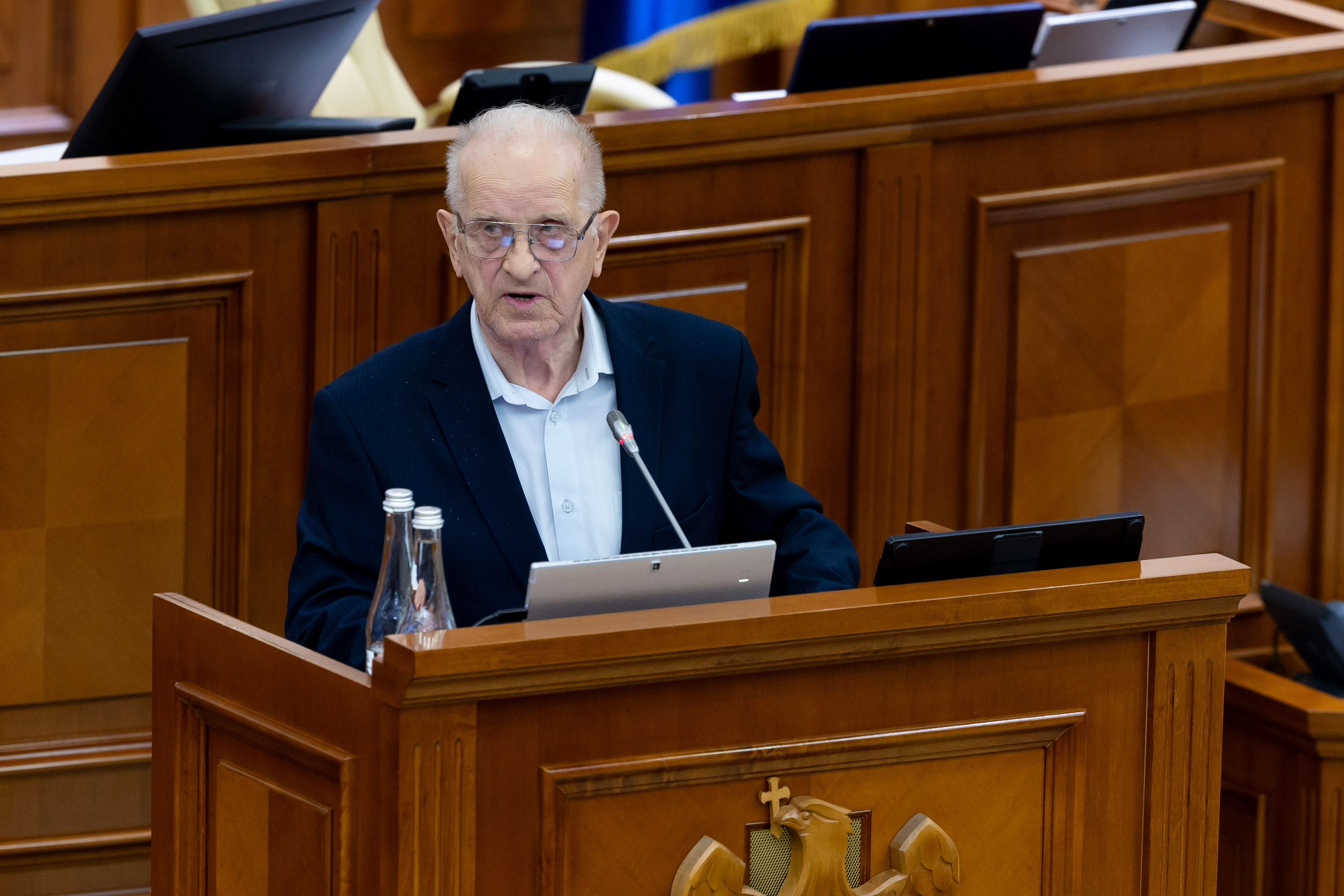
- Smirnov in 2025

Member of the Moldovan Parliament
- In office 9 December 2014 – 16 October 2025
- Parliamentary group: Party of Socialists; Bloc of Communists and Socialists

Co-President of the Party of Socialists
- In office 29 June 1997 – 18 December 2011 Serving with: Veronica Abramciuc
- Succeeded by: Igor Dodon

Member of the Chișinău Municipal Council
- In office 6 June 1999 – 15 June 2007

Deputy Mayor of Chișinău
- In office 10 May 1995 – 6 June 1999

Personal details
- Born: 17 September 1939 (age 87) Andijan, Uzbek SSR, Soviet Union
- Party: PSRM (since 1997)
- Other political affiliations: Socialist Party of Moldova (1992-1997)

Eduard Smirnov (born 17 September 1939) is a Moldovan politician. He was Member of the Moldovan Parliament from 2014 until 2025.
