= Agronomovca =

- Commune
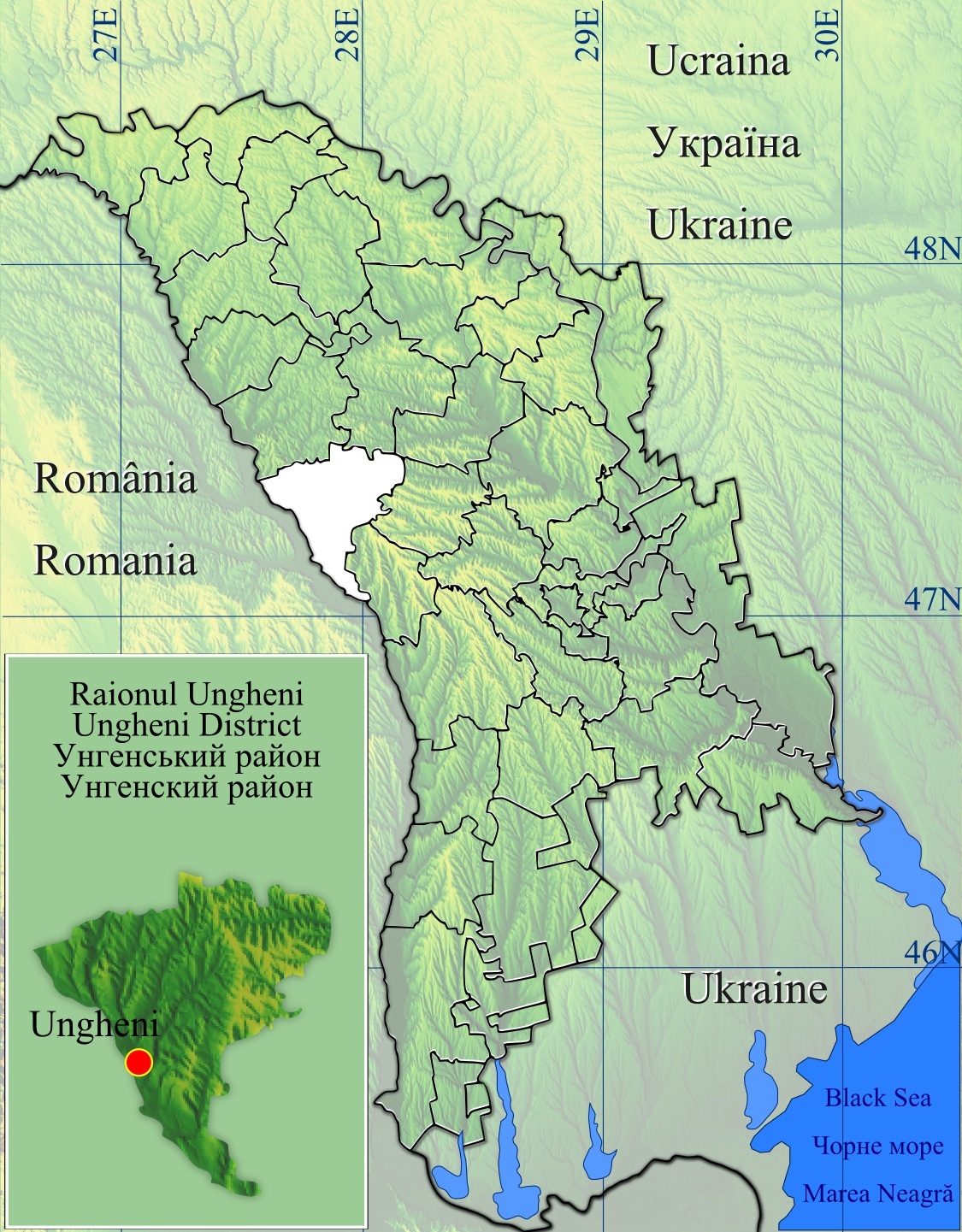
- Location within Ungheni
- Coordinates: 47°20′58″N 27°53′43″E
- Country: Moldova

Government
  - Mayor: Vasile Grușco

Population (2014)
  - Total: 1,000
- Time zone: UTC+2 (EET)
  - Summer (DST): UTC+3 (EEST)
- Postal code: MD-3611

Agronomovca is a commune in Ungheni District, Moldova. It is composed of three villages: Agronomovca, Negurenii Noi and Zăzulenii Noi.

== Demographics ==
According to the 2014 census, the commune has a population of 1,000 inhabitants. At the 2004 census, there were 1,234 inhabitants. In the commune of Agronomovca there lived 1234 people: 48.46% men and 51.54% women. Ethnic composition of the population: 34.20% Moldovans, 63.61% Ukrainians, 1.62% Russians, 0.24% Gagauz, 0.32% other nationalities. In 2004, 441 individual farms were registered in the Agronomovca commune, with the average farm size being 2.8 people.

In Agronomovca village, according to the 2004 census, the population was 769 residents, consisting of 48.76% men and 51.24% women. The ethnic composition at that time was 31.86% Moldovans, 65.28% Ukrainians, 2.21% Russians, 0.13% Gagauz, and 0.52% other nationalities. While the 2014 census recorded 874 residents. In Negurenii Noi, according to the 2004 census, the population was 80 inhabitants. There were 43 men and 37 women. According to the 2004 census, the ethnic composition of the population was as follows: 37 Moldovans/Romanians (46.25%), 41 Ukrainians (51.25%) and 2 Russians (2.5%). While according to the 2024 census, the population was 55 inhabitants. In Zăzulenii Noi, according to the 2004 census, the village population was 385 people, of which 46.75% were men and 53.24% were women. The ethnic structure of the population in the village: 36.36% - Moldovans, 62.86% - Ukrainians, 0.26% - Russians, 0.52% - Gagauz.

== Geography ==
Agronomovca Commune is located at latitude 47.3486, longitude 27.8963 and an altitude of 92 meters above sea level. The direct distance to Ungheni is 18 km. While the direct distance to Chișinău is 112 km.

Agronomovca village covers an area of approximately 1.25 km^{2} and has a perimeter of 6.66 km. Negurenii Noi has an area of about 0.44 square kilometers, with a perimeter of 3.12 km. Zăzulenii Noi has an area of about 1.36 square kilometers, with a perimeter of 9.76 km.

== History ==
Agronomovca village was founded in 1912. An experimental agronomy station had opened in the village of Plop in 1895. The settlement that emerged nearby in 1911–1912 was named Agronomovca, likely in connection with that station. In 1922, the village had a population of 222. During the Soviet period, an eight-year school, a community center with a cinema, a library, a post office, a kindergarten, and a shop were opened there.

Negurenii Noi was first mentioned in documents in 1911. It was founded by a group of peasants originally from the village of Berlinți in northern Moldova. In 1933 the village had 120 inhabitants. During the Soviet period, a brigade of the collective farm "Lenin" with headquarters in the village of Pîrlița was located here. An 8-year school, a club with a cinema installation, a kindergarten, and a shop were opened in the village.

Zăzulenii Noi was mentioned in documents in 1908.

== Government ==
As of 2026, the mayor is Vasile Grușco from the Party of Socialists of the Republic of Moldova.

The composition of the Agronomovca Local Council (9 councilors), elected on November 5, 2023, is as follows:

Party	Councilors
Party of Socialists of the Republic of Moldova	8
Party of Communists of the Republic of Moldova	1
