= Common Action Party – Civil Congress =

Moldovan political party

Common Action Party – Civil Congress Partidul Acțiunii Comune – Congresul Civic
- Abbreviation: PAC–CC
- Founders: Iurie Muntean, Mark Tkachuk
- Founded: 8 December 2019
- Registered: 13 January 2020
- Headquarters: 7/1 Alexander Bernardazzi Street, Chișinău
- Youth wing: Youth Congress
- Women's wing: Women Congress
- Membership (2025): 352
- Ideology: Democratic socialism Progressivism; Social justice Euroscepticism; Pro-Europeanism (claimed)
- Political position: Left-wing
- National affiliation: Alternative
- Colours: Red; Orange
- Parliament: 1 / 101
- Municipal and District councils: 12 / 1,108

Party flag
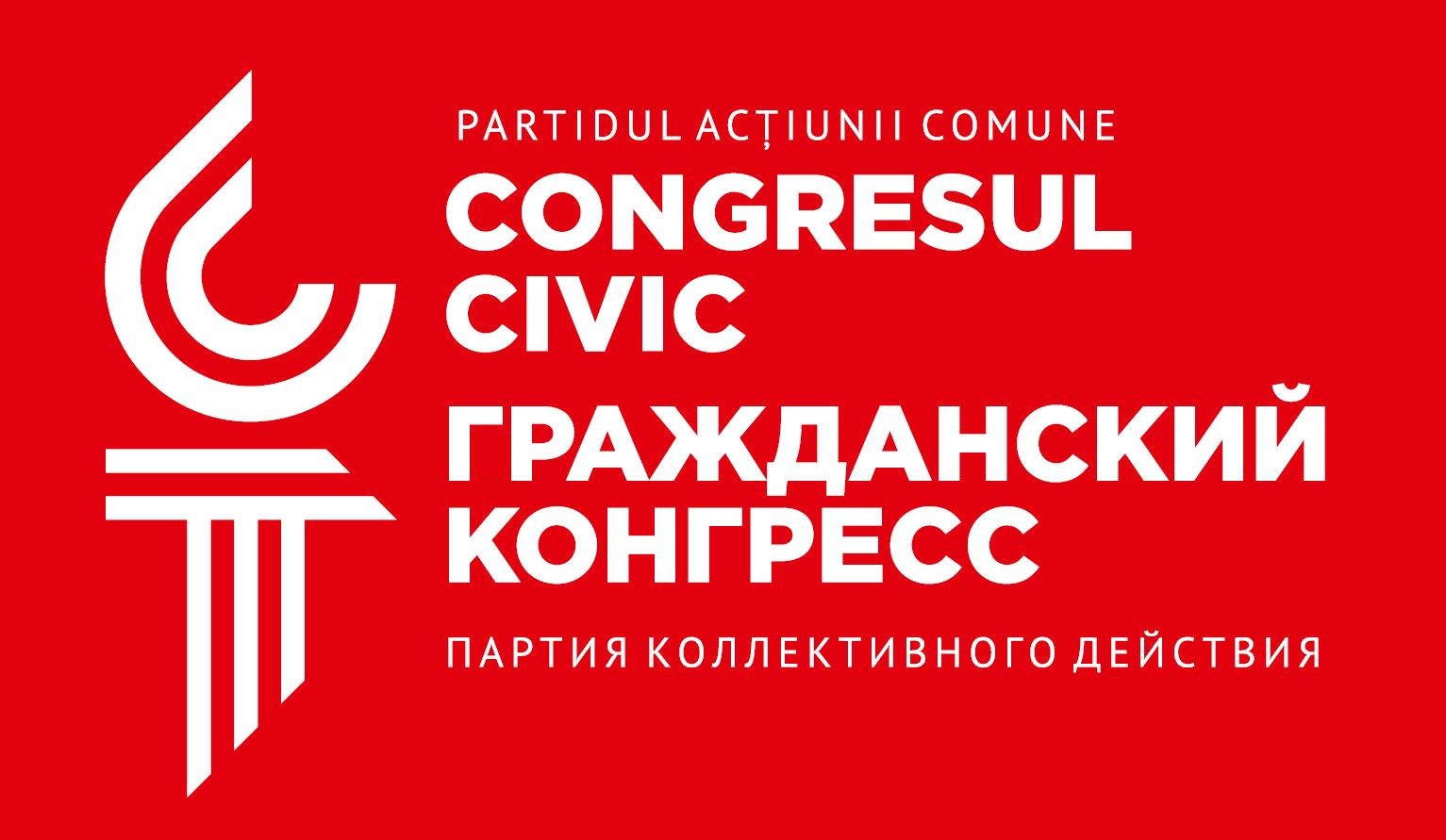

Website
- www.congresulcivic.md

The Common Action Party – Civil Congress (Romanian: Partidul Acțiunii Comune – Congresul Civic, PAC–CC) is a left-wing political party in the Republic of Moldova, founded by former members of Party of Communists of the Republic of Moldova. The party defines its values as social justice, solidarity, humanism, a scientific worldview and critical analysis. The party advocates for the reintegration of Transnistria into Moldova, as an instrument of economic modernization based on the interests of the absolute majority of people from both banks of the Dniester river. Civil Congress advocates for European integration, while opposing the unification of Moldova with Romania and NATO membership.

== History ==
The party was formed following the 2019 Moldovan constitutional crisis, inspiring its creation. On 31 July 2019, the political program of the party was presented for public discussion. The creation of the party provoked discussion on social networks and in both Moldovan and foreign media.

On 22 September 2019, in the House of Culture of Drochia, a regional forum of initiative groups of the Civil Congress of the Northern Regions of Moldova was held. On 17 November 2019, the founding conference of the Chișinău organization of the Civil Congress was held.

On 8 December 2019, the Constituent Congress of the new political formation was held. The Manifesto and the Charter were adopted, as well as its Action Plan "Moldova 2020–2025".

On 13 January 2020, the Common Action Party – Civil Congress was registered by the Public Services Agency of the Republic of Moldova.

== Ideology ==
The Civil Congress claimed to become the first anti-crisis party in the Republic of Moldova, which sees its mission in the swift and principled transformation of the entire system of social relations, in which a modernized economy must be subordinated to the goals of steady human development. The party claims to conduct a political struggle for the establishment and expansion of the social rights and freedoms of the absolute majority of citizens of the Republic of Moldova, relying on the initiatives and associations of civil society. Its declared political values are: social justice, solidarity, humanism, a scientific worldview and critical analysis.

It advocates for the reintegration of the Transnistrian region into the Republic of Moldova as an instrument of economic modernization, based on the interests of the absolute majority of citizens: the elderly, women and children. The Civil Congress sees European integration as a form of modernization, and supportive of the independence of the Republic of Moldova, while opposing the unification of Moldova and Romania and NATO membership for Moldova. Unlike traditional parties, the party has no chairman and is instead based on the principle of collective leadership.

Some political scientists have described the Civil Congress as part of a new generation of European left parties. The party has been compared to the Spanish party Podemos, the Greek party SYRIZA, France's La France Insoumise, Poland's Razem, the left wing of the UK's Labour Party and supporters of Bernie Sanders in the American Democratic Party. Romanian newspaper Adevărul criticized the party as being anti-Romanian and composed of ex-members of the Party of Communists. However the party never expressed any anti-Romanian views. Party co-founders Mark Tkachuk and Iurie Muntean are former members of the Party of Communists, but both were expelled in 2014.

== Activities and statements ==
=== 2020 presidential election ===
Civic Congress called for boycotting the 2020 Moldovan presidential election. Emphasizing its position on continuing of the "captured state" status of the Republic of Moldova, Civic Congress officially appealed to the Prosecutor General's Office to conduct the appropriate investigation over the Constitutional Court's judges actions on 4 March 2016. The same day, the party organized protests at the Constitutional Court's office against the presidential elections, demanding for early parliamentary elections.

=== Position on the war in Ukraine ===
The Russian invasion of Ukraine in 2022 shocked the party, with it cancelling its rising protests against the policies of the ruling Party of Action and Solidarity (PAS). Civil Congress also released its statement over the war in Ukraine, condemning the war, supporting the rising popularity of Moldova's constitutional neutrality and calling for strengthening of cooperation with Transnistria.

=== 2023 local elections ===
At the 2023 Moldovan local elections, the party earned its first members of rural and urban councils, including the mayorship in Elizavetovca.

=== 2025 parliamentary election ===
Ahead of the 2025 Moldovan parliamentary election, the party formed the Alternative Electoral Bloc with the National Alternative Movement, the Party of Development and Consolidation of Moldova, and independents led by Alexandr Stoianoglo. And on 28 September, Civil Congress became a parliamentary party, as a part of Alternative's parliamentary fraction. Mark Tkachuk, as a Member of the Parliament, was elected an Environment, Climate, and Green Transition Committee member.

== Election results ==
Parliament
| Election | Form of participation | Performance | | | | | Rank | Government |
| Election | Form of participation | Votes | % | ± pp | Seats | +/– | Rank | Government |
|---|---|---|---|---|---|---|---|---|
| 2021 | Independent | 11,269 | 0.77% | New | 0 / 101 | New | 9th | Extra-parliamentary |
| 2025 | Part of political alliance | 125,685 | 7.96% (Alternative) | ▲7.19 | 1 / 101 | ▲1 | 3rd | Opposition |
