= Petrușeni =

- Village
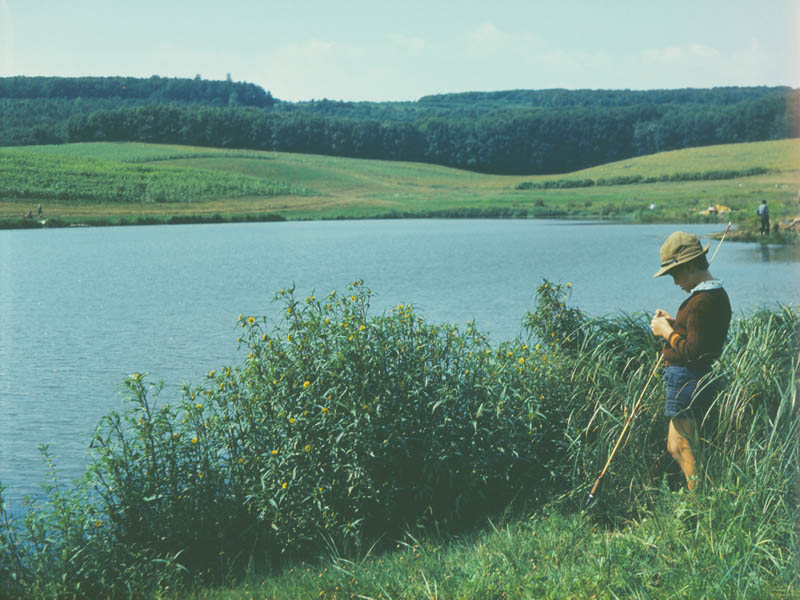

- Location within Moldova
- Coordinates: 47.85°N 27.3166666667°E
- Country: Moldova
- District: Rîșcani District

Government
  - Mayor: Natalia Ciobanu (PSDE)

Population (2014 census)
  - Total: 956
- Time zone: UTC+2 (EET)
  - Summer (DST): UTC+3 (EEST)

Petrușeni is a village in Rîșcani District, Moldova.

== Demographics ==
According to the 2014 Moldovan census, Petrușeni had a population of 956 residents. The village covers an area of 19.5 km², resulting in a population density of approximately 49 inhabitants per square kilometer as of 2014. Over the decade from 2004 to 2014, Petrușeni experienced a population decline of 2.5%.

Men slightly outnumbered women, comprising 52.4% of the population, compared to 47.6% female. In terms of age distribution, 15.3% of residents were under the age of 15, 69.6% were of working age (15–64), and 15.2% were aged 65 and older. The entire population lived in rural areas.

Nearly all residents (97.9%) were born in Moldova, with a small number (2.1%) originating from other countries within the Commonwealth of Independent States. The ethnic composition was predominantly Moldovans (95.2%), with small numbers of Romanians (2.5%), Ukrainians (1.7%), and Russians (0.6%). Moldovan was the most commonly spoken native language, reported by 87% of residents, followed by Romanian (10.6%), Russian (1.3%), and Ukrainian (1.2%). The vast majority of the population (97.9%) identified as Orthodox, with 2.1% adhering to other religions.

== Administration and local government ==
Petrușeni is governed by a local council composed of nine members. The most recent local elections, in November 2023, resulted in the following composition: 4 councillors from the Party of Socialists of the Republic of Moldova, 3 councillors from the European Social Democratic Party, and 2 councillor from the Party of Action and Solidarity. The Liberal Democratic Party of Moldova and the Chance Political Party also ran, but didn't get enough votes to select councillors. In the same elections, the candidate from the European Social Democratic Party, Natalia Ciobanu, was elected as mayor with a 65.16% majority of the vote.
