= Adrian Lebedinschi =

Moldavian politician (born 1976)

Adrian Lebedinschi MP
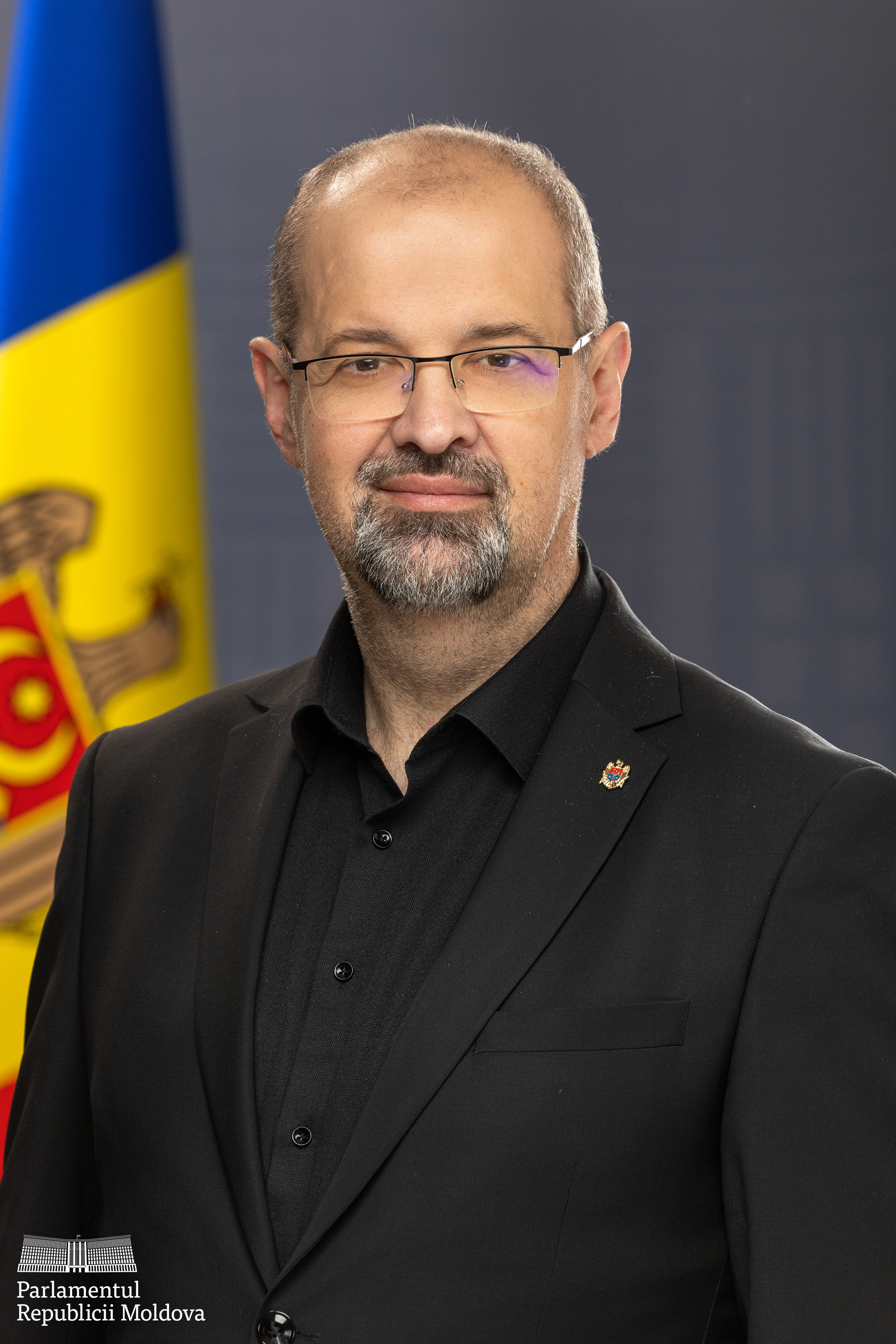
- Official portrait, 2025

Member of the Moldovan Parliament
- Incumbent
- Assumed office 22 October 2025
- Parliamentary group: Party of Socialists
- In office 4 November 2021 – 21 December 2023
- Preceded by: Igor Dodon
- Succeeded by: Said-Muhmat Amaev
- Parliamentary group: Bloc of Communists and Socialists
- In office 21 October 2015 – 23 July 2021
- Preceded by: Ion Ceban
- Parliamentary group: Party of Socialists

Member of the Chișinău Municipal Council
- In office 22 November 2023 – 22 October 2025
- In office 14 June 2015 – 21 October 2015

Personal details
- Born: 12 August 1976 (age 49) Colicăuți, Moldavian SSR, Soviet Union
- Citizenship: Moldova; Romania
- Party: Party of Socialists of the Republic of Moldova
- Education: Ștefan cel Mare Police Academy; Moldova State University

Adrian Lebedinschi (born 12 August 1976) is a Moldovan jurist and politician. He has served as Member of the Moldovan Parliament in three legislatures.
