= Electoral Bloc Motherland =

Electoral Bloc Motherland Blocul Electoral Patria — Rodina Избирательный блок Patria — Родина
- Leader: Boris Muravschi; Veronica Abramciuc; Victor Morev
- Founded: 17 December 2004; 20 years ago
- Dissolved: 9 November 2007; 17 years ago
- Merged into: Party of Socialists of Moldova "Motherland"
- Headquarters: Chişinău, Moldova
- Ideology: Communism; Socialism; Moldovenism; Russian minority politics
- Member parties: Party of Socialists of Moldova "Motherland"; Socialist Party of Moldova
- Colours: Red; Maroon

Website
- patria-rodina.md

The Electoral Bloc Motherland (Blocul Electoral Patria - Rodina) was a communist electoral alliance in Moldova formed by the Socialist Party of Moldova (Partidul Socialist din Moldova) and the Party of Socialists of the Republic of Moldova (Partidul Socialiştilor din Republica Moldova)

In the legislative elections on 6 March 2005, the bloc won 4.9% of the popular vote but no seats.

== Electoral results ==
Parliament
Election	Leader	Performance					Rank	Government
Election	Leader	Votes	%	± pp	Seats	+/–	Rank	Government
2005	Boris Muravschi	77,490	4.97%	New	0 / 101	New	▲4th	Extra-parliamentary (PCRM)
2005	Boris Muravschi	77,490	4.97%	New	0 / 101	New	▲4th	Extra-parliamentary (PCRM)
