= Gaik Vartanean =

Armenian-Moldovan politician (born 1979)

Gaik Vartanean MP
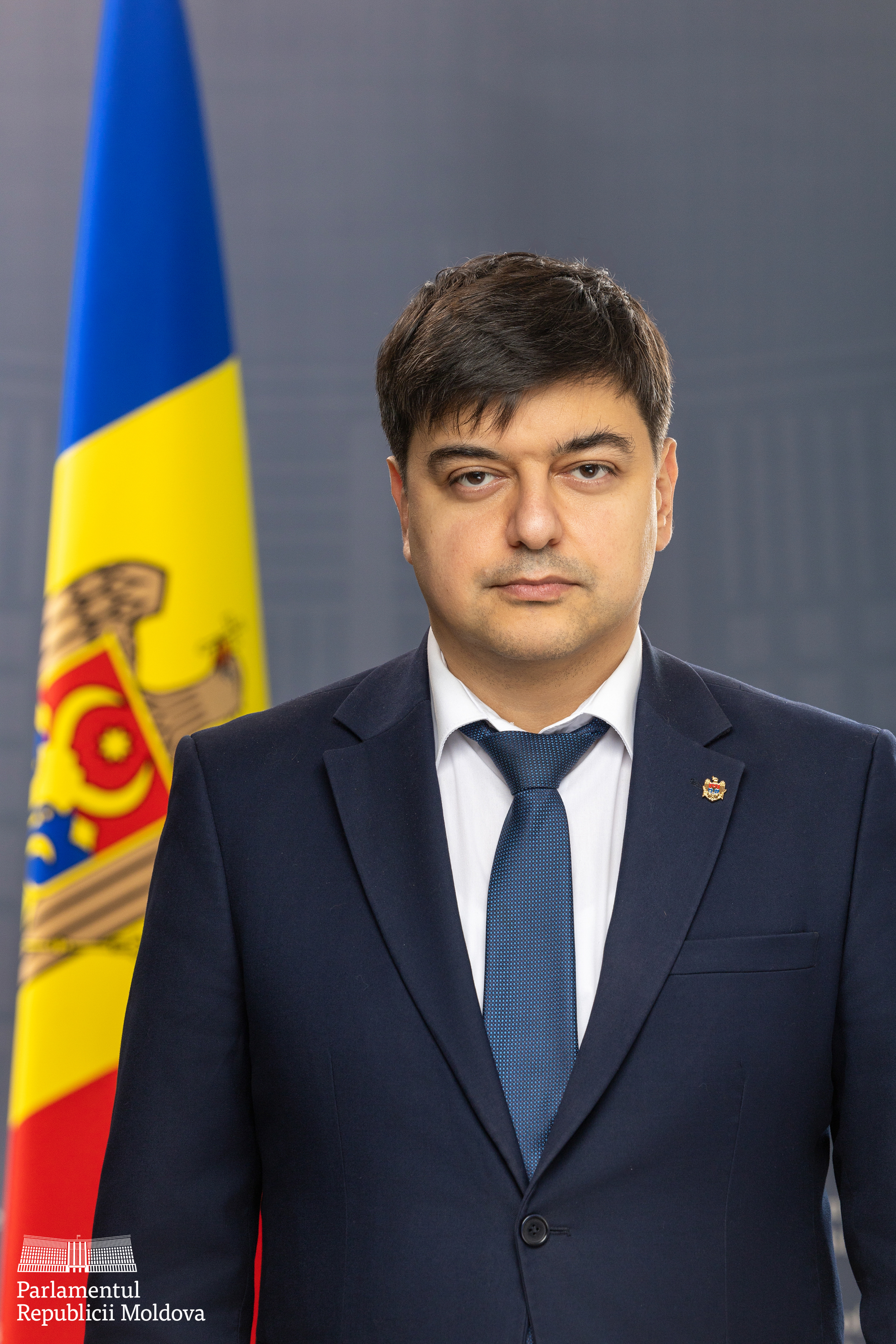
- Official portrait, 2025

Member of the Moldovan Parliament
- Incumbent
- Assumed office 21 July 2022
- Preceded by: Alla Dolință
- Parliamentary group: Bloc of Communists and Socialists; Alternative Bloc
- In office 9 March 2019 – 23 July 2021
- Parliamentary group: Party of Socialists

Member of the Chișinău Municipal Council
- In office 14 June 2015 – 9 March 2019

Personal details
- Born: 19 August 1979 (age 46) Yerevan, Armenian SSR, Soviet Union
- Party: National Alternative Movement (since 2022)
- Other political affiliations: Alternative (since 2025); Party of Socialists of the Republic of Moldova (until 2022)
- Education: Moldova State University

Gaik Vartanean (born 19 August 1979) is an Armenian-Moldovan politician. He is currently a Member of the Moldovan Parliament, in his third term.
