= Mark Tkachuk =

Moldovan politician

Mark Tkachuk MP
- Mark Tkaciuk
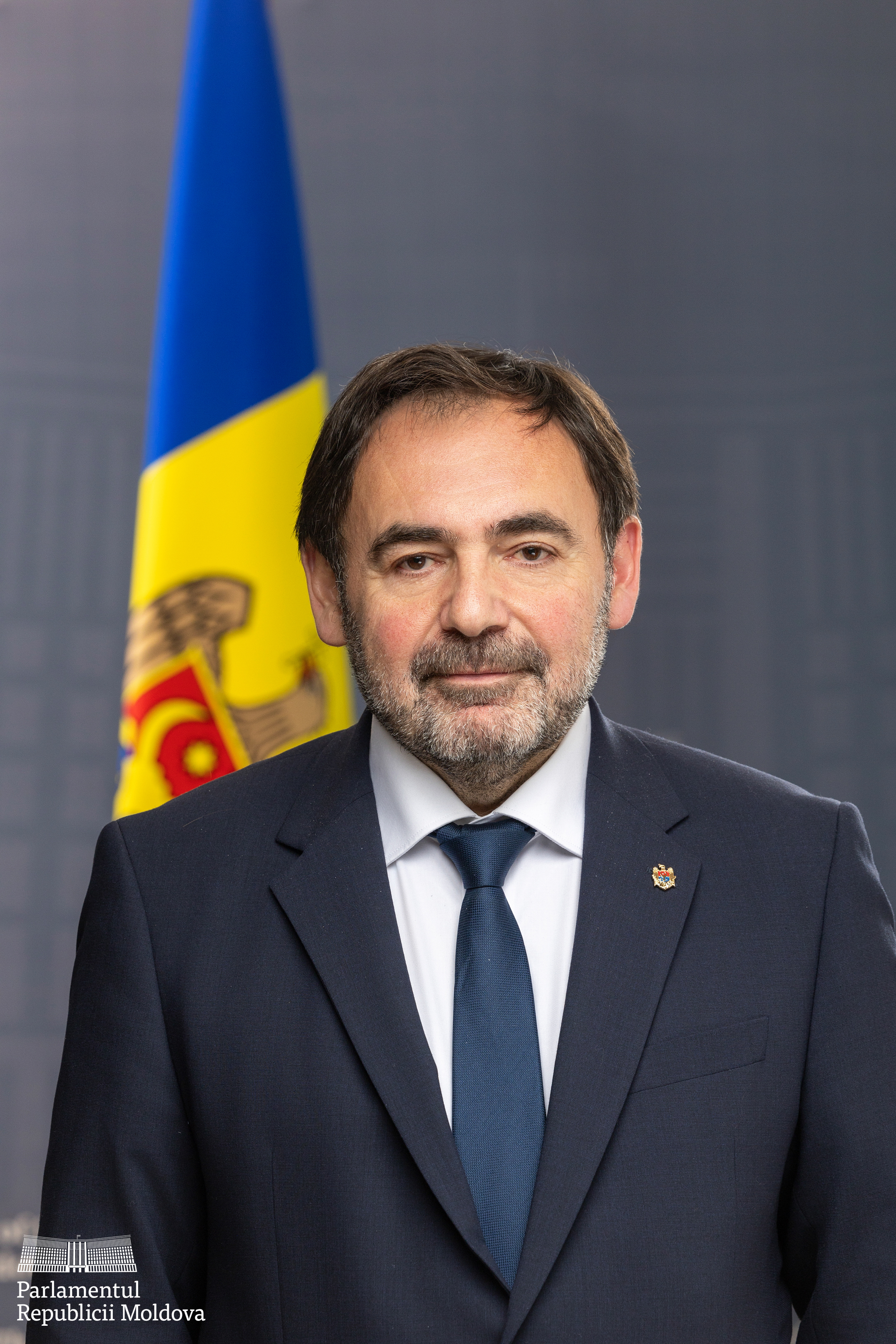
- Official portrait, 2025

Member of the Moldovan Parliament
- Incumbent
- Assumed office 22 October 2025
- Parliamentary group: Alternative Bloc
- In office 22 April 2009 – 23 May 2014
- Succeeded by: Vladimir Telnov
- Parliamentary group: Party of Communists
- In office 22 March 2001 – 2 May 2002
- Succeeded by: Ala Ursul
- Parliamentary group: Party of Communists

Domestic Policy Advisor to the President
- In office 11 June 2002 – 15 October 2008
- President: Vladimir Voronin
- Succeeded by: Sergiu Stati

Personal details
- Born: 26 September 1966 (age 59) Soroca, Moldavian SSR, Soviet Union
- Party: PAC–CC (since 2019)
- Other political affiliations: PCRM (2001–2014); Alternative (2025–2026)
- Education: Moldova State University
- Occupation: Historian • Archeologist • Politician
- Awards: Order of Honour

Mark Tkachuk (also Tkaciuk; born 26 September 1966) is a Moldovan politician, historian, archaeologist, and anthropologist. He is a member of the Parliament of the Republic of Moldova and has been active in Moldova's political and academic life.

== Biography ==
Mark Tkachuk was born on 26 September 1966 in the town Soroca, in the Moldavian SSR of the Soviet Union (now Moldova); he grew up in the village of Elizavetovca, today in Dondușeni District.

The ethnic ancestry of Tkachuk is, as he himself stated, complex. He described his mother as a Hemshin Armenian and his father as half Ukrainian, half Moldovan. On his maternal side, one of his great-grandfathers was a wealthy Syrian Armenian, who married a Russian Nekrasovite woman. Their son, Mark's grandfather, married a woman, his grandmother, of Abkhazian maternal ancestry. On his paternal side, he had a Polish great-grandmother, and his grandfather was born in Podolia, a region today in Ukraine; he married a Moldovan from Grinăuți-Raia.

He graduated from the History Faculty at the State University of Moldova and later pursued further studies at the Russian Academy of Sciences (1992–1994). During this period, he was affiliated with the far-left Confederation of Anarcho-Syndicalists.

=== Political career ===
Tkachuk joined the Party of Communists of the Republic of Moldova (PCRM) in the early 2000s and became Domestic Policy Advisor to President Vladimir Voronin from 2001 to 2008. He played a central role in modernizing the PCRM and negotiating the party's accession to the Party of the European Left. Tkachuk is known for his support for Moldova's integration into the Eurasian Union and fostering strong ties with Russia, positions that have drawn both support and criticism.

In 2005 and 2006, VIP Magazine included Tkachuk in the list of "most influential Moldovans," ranking 11th and 6th, respectively.

After 2009, as the PCRM entered the opposition, Tkachuk began advocating for reforms within the party, focusing on turning it into a more modern, European-left party. In 2010, he stated that there was no difference between the Romanian and "Moldovan" languages, but that the idea of the Romanian language appeared much later. Tkachuk became known as the "grey eminence" of the party due to his influential role, until his departure in 2014. Tkachuk announced his withdrawal from politics in the same year.

Tkachuk returned to politics in 2019, co-founding the Collective Action Party – Civic Congress alongside Iurie Muntean. The party promotes left-wing, civil-labour oriented policies and has been moderate critical of both the pro-European and pro-Russian political agendas, focusing on issues such as social-market and responsible modernization.

He supported Alexander Stoianoglo in the presidential election in 2024.

In 2025, Tkachuk, along with Ion Chicu, Alexander Stoianoglo, and Ion Ceban, announced the foundation of the political pro-eurointegration bloc "Alternativa."

=== Academic contributions ===
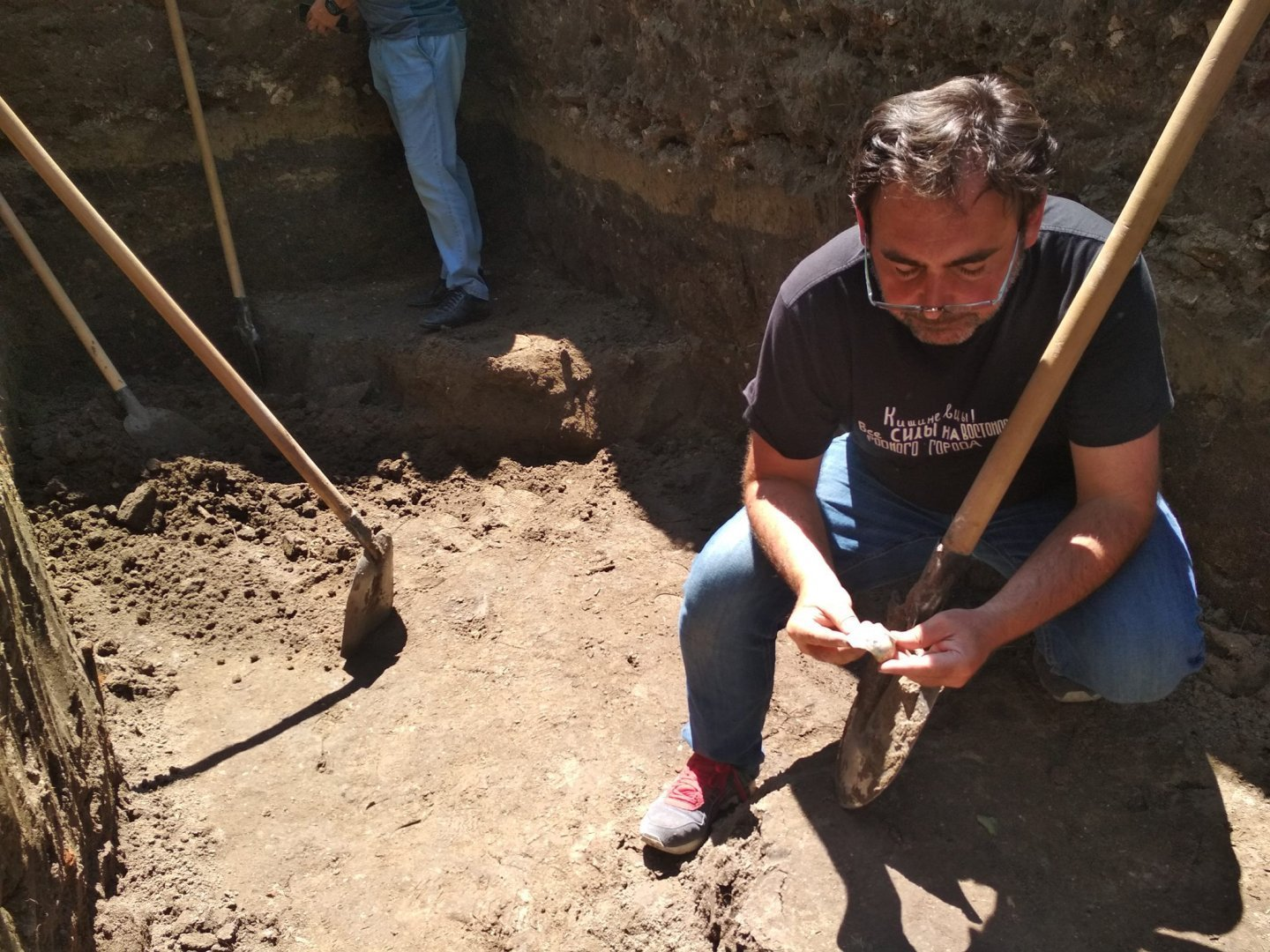
Tkachuk Excavation in Chisinau

Tkachuk founded the High Anthropological School in 1998, which provided education in history, archaeology, and STEM fields. At the same time, he became the chief editor of Stratum Plus, a Q1-rated academic journal specializing in history and archaeology. His conducted archaeological excavations in numerous locations throughout Moldova, organized the first grave archaeological excavation in Chișinău. As well as participating in projects in Ukraine and Bulgaria.

In 2016, he established the public academic Library of Civilization, named after Marc Bloch, which started with a foundation of 50,000 books. Some of the world’s leading specialists in the archaeology of the region donated their archives to the library. For example, Bernhard Hänsel, a professor from the Free University of Berlin, bequeathed 1,000 books to the library posthumously. The library is known for holding various meetings, conferences and think tank formats.

In 2018, he released the first audio guide on Moldova based on historical works.

Mark Tkachuk created a historical film series in collaboration with Newsmaker as part of the 2019 special project "Общий язык" (Common Language). The series explores Moldova's history, covering periods from the Stone Age to the 14th century.

He established a new Faculty of Social Sciences at the High Anthropological School in collaboration with Manchester University and Shaninka, but, due to the political crisis stemming from oligarchic state capture and the subsequent impact of COVID-19, the project fell apart in its final stages.
