= Elizavetovca =

- Commune
- Location within Moldova
- Coordinates: 48.2808333333°N 27.7086111111°E
- Country: Moldova
- District: Dondușeni District

Government
  - Mayor: Serghei Gorin (Common Action Party – Civil Congress)

Population (2014)
  - Total: 513
- Time zone: UTC+2 (EET)
  - Summer (DST): UTC+3 (EEST)

Elizavetovca is a commune in Dondușeni District, Moldova. It is composed of two villages, Boroseni and Elizavetovca (formerly Elisabeta).

== Demographics ==
According to the 2014 Moldovan census, Elizavetovca had a population of 513 residents. Covering an area of 14.80 square kilometers, the commune had a population density of approximately 34.7 people per square kilometer. Between the 2004 and 2014 censuses, the population declined by 2.1%.

Women made up a slight majority of the population, with 53.6% (275 individuals), while men accounted for 46.4% (238 individuals). The age distribution shows a relatively young demographic, with 25% of residents under the age of 15. Meanwhile, 65.1% were of working age (15–64), and 9.9% were aged 65 and older.

The vast majority of residents (95.9%) were born in Moldova, with a small minority (4.1%) born in other countries of the Commonwealth of Independent States.

Elizavetovca has a predominantly Ukrainian ethnic character, with 74.3% of the population identifying as Ukrainian. Moldovans made up 23.4%, while Russians represented a small minority at 2.4%. This ethnic composition is mirrored in native language usage: 76.1% of residents reported Ukrainian as their native language, followed by Moldovan (18.1%) and Russian (5.7%).

Religiously, the community is overwhelmingly Orthodox, with 98.4% of residents adhering to this faith. A small fraction (1.6%) reported belonging to other religions.

== Administration and local government ==
Elizavetovca is governed by a local council composed of nine members. The most recent local elections, in November 2023, resulted in the following composition: 4 councillors from the Common Action Party – Civil Congress, 3 councillors from the Party of Socialists of the Republic of Moldova, and 2 councillors from the Liberal Democratic Party of Moldova. In the same elections, the candidate from the Common Action Party – Civil Congress, Serghei Gorin, was elected as mayor.
