= Modern University for the Humanities =

Coordinates: 55.7365°N 37.6934°E

- Motto: "Accessible Quality Education"
- Type: Private
- Established: 1992
- Rector: Professor Mikhail Karpenko
- Students: 200,000 (2008)
- Location: Moscow, Russia
- Website: muh.ru

The Modern University for the Humanities (MUH) (Russian: Современная гуманитарная академия), established in 1992. The university has been deprived of license order No.179-07 of January 30, 2017, accreditation cancelled April 26, 2015. This higher educational institution in Moscow, Russia offers primarily distance-based undergraduate, graduate, and post-graduate studies and vocational education.

General management of MUH is performed from its Moscow headquarters. Currently, there are 628 educational centers established within the framework of MUH to support the dissemination of distance learning and correspondence material. These centers are located in the Russian Federation and CIS countries including Armenia, Belarus, Kazakhstan, Kyrgyzstan, Moldova, Ukraine, Georgia, Azerbaijan, and Tajikistan. MUH also has educational centers outside the former Soviet world, in Vietnam, Israel, China, Peru, and the Czech Republic. Particular attention is focused on extending the geographic coverage of MUH, especially on development in foreign countries. The university currently claimed an enrollment of more than 200,000 (2008) students.

MUH is the only Russian higher educational institution possessing satellite educational technology. This allows the university the opportunity to provide distance learning resources to every geographic destination in the Russian Federation and in a number of Asian and European countries. MUH possesses satellite educational television with its own teleport for twenty-four-hour, four-channel broadcasting throughout the territory of Russia and the CIS countries. These four channels are also used for data transmission. It is a goal of the university to equip all MUH branches with VSAT-teleports, in order to allow high-quality broadcasting and educational processes between branches and the university's Moscow headquarters.

Utilization of video, audio and slide lectures, teaching computer programs and other multimedia products is the primary method of education at MUH. The majority of multimedia educational material is produced by MUH staff.

The Modern University for the Humanities has eight scientific-research institutes founded within the University. They have specializations which include Educational Programs Development, Educational Technologies Development, Television Education, Computer Education, Study Psychology and Sociology of Education, Mass Media and Publications, Electronic Communication Development, and Students’ Health-Improvement.

MUH has a publishing house which issues two newspapers, digests, and a number of scientific and educational journals. The total annual run of educational, methodical, and scientific literature at the MUH's publishing house makes up more than 8 million copies of 4,000 titles.

MUH is a member of a number of international organizations. In September, 2003 MUH joined Magna Charta Universitatum to start full-fledged integration with the Bologna Process. The University concluded bilateral agreements with a number of foreign universities. Many students from MUH go abroad to take different courses.

In 2014 and 2015, MUH became a subject of journalist investigations, mostly initiated by Russia-1 TV channel's pundit, Boris Sobolev. According to "Special Correspondent" TV program, quality of distance learning was in doubt despite heavy advertising campaign, as lectures and examinations at the institution are replaced by video translations and computer tests respectively. During test on knowledge of Constitution of Russia, one of the jurisprudence students failed to know the number of articles there, while the other was not able to remember content of the Article 1. Also, according to the program, auditoria for study were placed in buildings not adapted for studying, which happened in one of MUH's branch institutions in Vyazma. That branch was closed before 2012, after Rosobrnadzor expelled MUH's license for "extremely low level of education", but, according to Sobolev, it still worked as of 2012, still being located in technical building. On 27 February 2014, Rosobrnadzor published a list of 126 institutions which were stripped of their educational licenses, 51 of which were MUH's branches also.
