= Ion Ceban =

Mayor of Chișinău since 2019

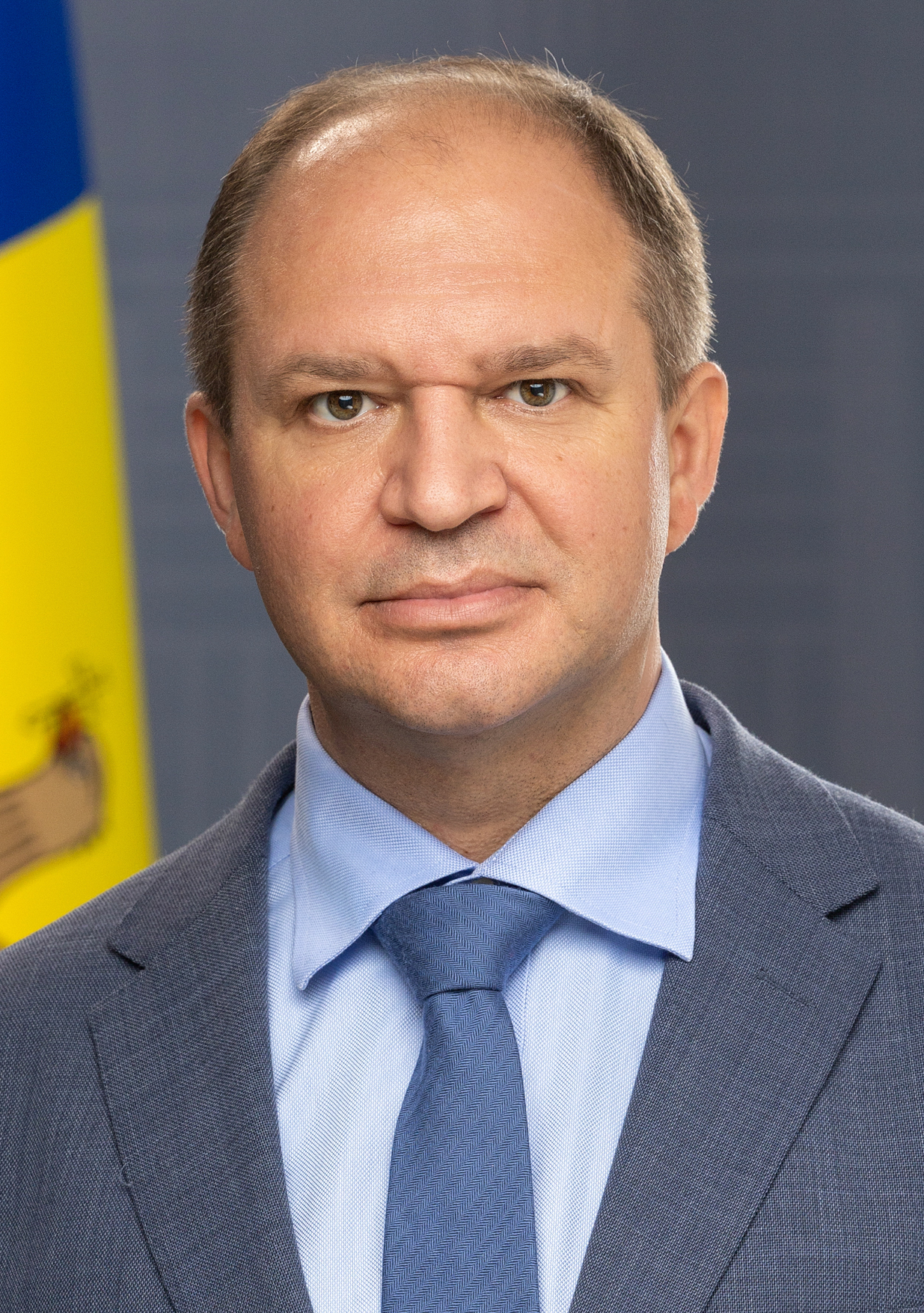
- Official portrait, 2025

Mayor of Chișinău
- Incumbent
- Assumed office 11 November 2019
- Preceded by: Andrei Năstase

President of the National Alternative Movement
- Incumbent
- Assumed office 8 June 2019
- Preceded by: Party established

Member of the Moldovan Parliament
- In office 22 October 2025 – 13 November 2025
- Succeeded by: Angela Cutasevici
- Parliamentary group: Alternative Bloc
- In office 9 March 2019 – 14 November 2019
- Succeeded by: Mihail Paciu
- Parliamentary group: Party of Socialists
- In office 15 September 2011 – 15 October 2015
- Preceded by: Serghei Filipov
- Succeeded by: Adrian Lebedinschi
- Parliamentary group: Party of Communists; Party of Socialists

Vice President of the Moldovan Parliament
- In office 8 June 2019 – 13 November 2019 Serving with: Mihai Popșoi; Alexandru Slusari; Monica Babuc
- President: Igor Dodon
- Prime Minister: Maia Sandu
- Preceded by: Valeriu Ghilețchi
- Succeeded by: Vlad Batrîncea

Personal details
- Born: 30 June 1980 (age 46) Chișinău, Moldavian SSR, Soviet Union
- Party: National Alternative Movement (2022–present)
- Other political affiliations: PSRM (2014–2021); PCRM (until 2012)
- Spouse: Tatiana Țaulean
- Children: 3
- Education: Moldova State University; Technical University of Moldova

Ion Ceban (also Ivan Cheban; born 30 June 1980) is a Moldovan politician serving as Mayor of Chișinău since 11 November 2019. He was re-elected in 2023 in the first round with 50.62% of the votes. He is also the president of the National Alternative Movement.

He previously served as Vice President of the Parliament of Moldova (2019), Member of Parliament in three legislatures, and Municipal Councillor in the Chișinău Municipal Council (2015–2019). He held several positions within the executive branch, from department head to deputy minister, including Head of the Secretariat of the National Commission for European Integration within the Government of Moldova.

== Early life and education ==
Ion Ceban was born on 30 June 1980 in Chișinău, Republic of Moldova, into the family of Vasile and Eugenia Ceban. He is married to Tatiana Țaulean and has three children: Ilinca, Vasile and Marc.

He graduated from the State University of Moldova, Faculty of Mathematics and Computer Science, with a bachelor's degree, and from the Technical University of Moldova, Faculty of Computers, Informatics and Microelectronics, with a master's degree. He subsequently pursued studies and training internships in public administration in the Russian Federation, France and Germany. Since 2019, he has been a doctoral candidate in public administration.

== Career ==
Ion Ceban worked in several state structures, including:

- Chișinău City Hall – General Directorate for Social Assistance; municipal councillor
- Government of Moldova – director of the projects department; deputy director of the Information Network; head of the youth programmes directorate; Deputy Minister of Education and Youth; Head of the Secretariat of the National Commission for European Integration
- Presidency of the Republic of Moldova – chief consultant on domestic policy; presidential advisor on domestic policy; secretary and spokesperson of the president

Ion Ceban was elected Member of Parliament in the 8th, 9th and 10th legislatures of the Parliament of Moldova (2011–2014 and 2014–2015), where he held the positions of Vice President of the Parliamentary Committee for Culture, Education, Research, Youth, Sports and Mass Media, and Vice President of the Parliament. He served as Municipal Councillor in the Chișinău Municipal Council from 2015 to 2019.

On 24 February 2019, he returned to the Parliament of the Republic of Moldova as a Member of Parliament, subsequently serving as Vice President of the Parliament from 8 June to 13 November 2019.

On 11 November 2019, he was elected Mayor-General of Chișinău municipality, and on 5 November 2023, he was re-elected for a second mandate in the first round, with 50.62% of the votes. He also serves as Vice President of the Congress of Local Public Authorities of Moldova.

In September 2025, Ion Ceban was elected Member of Parliament on the lists of the Alternativa Bloc, but renounced his mandate, choosing to continue his activity as Mayor-General of Chișinău — a decision that had been publicly known since the beginning of the electoral campaign.

== Political career ==
Ion Ceban began his political activity within the local and central public administration, including Parliament, the Government and the Presidency, holding elective and administrative positions at both national and local level. He was a member of the PCRM (until 2012) and of the PSRM (until 2021). In December 2022, he founded the National Alternative Movement (MAN), a centre-left party with a European social-democratic ideology.

As MAN president, he led several electoral campaigns:

- the 2023 local elections, where he was elected mayor in the first round and achieved the highest score in the Chișinău Municipal Council;
- the 2024 European Parliament election, organising an information campaign in the Republic of Moldova for the joint PSD-PNL candidate list from Romania;
- the constitutional referendum of 20 October 2024 on the Republic of Moldova's European integration aspirations, campaigning in favour of the YES option;
- the 2025 parliamentary elections.

== Mayor of Chișinău ==
In 2019, Ion Ceban was elected Mayor-General of Chișinău following the local elections of 3 November 2019, receiving over 52% of the votes in the second round (123,807 votes). He was re-elected for a new mandate in the local elections of 5 November 2023, in the first round, with over 133,000 votes (over 50.62%).

=== Administrative activity and achievements ===
As Mayor-General, Ion Ceban promoted and initiated a series of urban infrastructure projects aimed at improving mobility and quality of life in the capital, including:

- Energy efficiency measures, including through European funds;
- Road rehabilitation, including the comprehensive rehabilitation of three arteries in the historic area of the capital;
- Waste management through the "Chișinău Solid Waste" project;
- Modernisation of the entire public transport fleet, including through the "MOVE IT like Lublin" project;
- Rehabilitation and modernisation of over 40 parks and green spaces.

Under his coordination, Chișinău City Hall attracted investments of over 4.5 billion lei through various EU financial instruments. Projects in progress include the extension of Mircea cel Bătrân Boulevard, the construction of Industrială and Mesager streets (investment of over 1.5 billion lei, signed on 19 August 2025), and the rehabilitation of the Bîc River with flood prevention solutions.

The administration also consistently increased investment in educational infrastructure, including the construction of new kindergartens in Băcioi and Sângera, a new block at Nursery-Kindergarten no. 125, Kindergarten no. 54, and the "Pro Succes" High School.

The social sector has been significantly consolidated: Chișinău currently offers over 100 social services and programmes, of which over 30 are unique in the country. The youth sector benefits from the largest budget in the country, and the city runs active business development programmes.

=== International cooperation ===
During Ion Ceban's mandates (from 2019), Chișinău Municipality expanded its participation in EU funding programmes and international cooperation initiatives in areas including urban mobility, sustainable development, tourism, environmental protection, social inclusion and public administration modernisation, funded through Interreg, Interreg Europe, Interreg NEXT – Black Sea Basin, HORIZON, URBACT, and others.

Prior to Ion Ceban's mandate, the municipality was affiliated mainly with the AIMF (International Association of Francophone Mayors). Starting in 2023, Chișinău became a member of several international networks, including:

- GPM – Global Parliament of Mayors
- METROPOLIS – Global Network of Major Cities and Metropolitan Areas
- ICLEI – Local Governments for Sustainability
- ECCAR – European Coalition of Cities Against Racism
- Covenant of Mayors East
- UTM – Urban Transitions Mission
- Gap Fund – Urban Climate Finance Gap Fund
- Eurocities

International cooperation agreements signed during his mandate include:

Date	Agreement	Partner
17 November 2021	Twinning Agreement	Xi'an, China
27 November 2021	Twinning Agreement	Suceava, Romania
22 April 2021	Memorandum of Understanding	Wuhan, China
1 June 2021	Cooperation Agreement	Kazan, Russia
3 June 2021	Cooperation Agreement	Obninsk, Russia
15 June 2021	Cooperation Agreement	Buzău County, Romania
24 June 2021	Cooperation Agreement	Suceava County, Romania
15 February 2022	Cooperation Agreement	Ilfov County, Romania
22 April 2023	Twinning Agreement	Piatra Neamț, Romania
19 December 2024	Cooperation Agreement	Deva, Romania

The municipality was also represented at sessions of the Congress of Local and Regional Authorities of the Council of Europe, and implemented energy efficiency and infrastructure projects with the EBRD, EIB, and other EU financial instruments.

== Controversies ==
=== Entry ban from Romania ===
In July 2025, the Romanian authorities imposed an entry ban on Ion Ceban under national legislation regarding the regime of foreigners and national security. The decision was issued without the publication of detailed reasons. Ion Ceban contested the measure in the Romanian courts, initiating legal proceedings against the competent Romanian state institutions; the cases are currently pending.

The ban had direct diplomatic consequences: twinning procedures between Chișinău and Focșani (initiated in July 2024 as part of the "Cities of the Union" project) and with Iași were suspended by the Romanian side in July 2025.

At the end of August 2025, Ion Ceban visited Italy — an EU member state — to participate in an international event organised under the auspices of UNESCO dedicated to cities against racism. Media sources reported that he was granted a limited single-entry visa valid only on Italian territory, issued by the Italian authorities.

The measure was interpreted by political commentators as occurring within a context of internal political competition, against the background of Ion Ceban's consolidation as a national-level leader. Other opinions rejected this interpretation, emphasising the administrative nature of the decision.

== International relations ==
As Mayor-General, Ion Ceban maintained active external relations, with particular emphasis on bilateral ties with Romania and dialogue with international partners. He held a significant number of meetings with Romanian political leaders, including mayors, county council presidents, ministers and party leaders, representing members of the PSD, PNL, and USR, as well as high-level meetings with Romanian officials, including Prime Minister Marcel Ciolacu.

Ion Ceban also maintained relations with Brussels through several official visits dedicated to strengthening Chișinău's partnerships with the European Union, including meetings with the leadership of Eurocities and other EU officials.

In public statements, Ion Ceban has emphasised that EU support is intended for the citizens of the Republic of Moldova, not for any particular political formation.

Political offices
Preceded by Andrei Năstase	Mayor of Chișinău; 2019–present	Incumbent
