= Iurie Muntean =

Moldovan politician

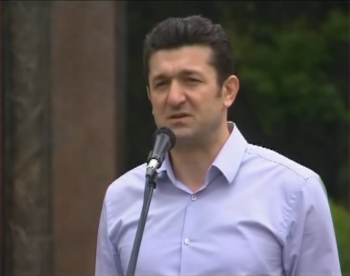
- Muntean in 2012

Member of the Moldovan Parliament
- In office 14 August 2009 – 9 December 2014
- Parliamentary group: Party of Communists

Deputy Minister of Economy and Trade
- In office 30 April 2008 – 9 September 2009
- President: Vladimir Voronin
- Prime Minister: Zinaida Greceanîi
- Minister: Igor Dodon

Personal details
- Born: 13 May 1972 (age 54) Criuleni, Moldavian SSR, Soviet Union
- Party: PAC–CC (since 2019); Alternative (since 2025)
- Other political affiliations: PCRM (1994–2014)
- Education: Moldova State University
- Occupation: Lawyer • Politician

Iurie Muntean (born 13 May 1972) is a Moldovan politician, who served as a deputy Minister of Economy and Trade (2008–2009) and member of the Parliament of Moldova (2009–2014).

== Biography ==
Muntean graduated from Moldova State University in 1994. He worked as a jurist for the Ministry of Economy (July 1994 – June 1996), ARIA (1996–2002, August 2006 – April 2007), the office of lawyers "Justil Group". He then served as a deputy of Igor Dodon. In March 2001, Muntean participated with journalists Constantin Tănase, Aneta Grosu, and the folk music singer Maria Sarabaş in a Romanian-Moldovan delegation to Atlanta, where he danced "Hora Unirii", which is contrary to his party's anti-unionist ideology. Muntean, however, denies having danced Hora Unirii.

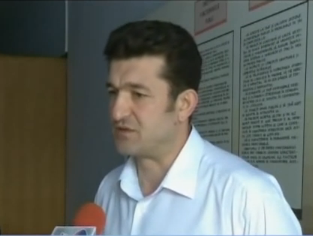
Muntean in 2012

Muntean served as the executive secretary of the Party of Communists of the Republic of Moldova (PCRM) since 2010. He was at one point a favourite to succeed Vladimir Voronin as the head of the Party of Communists of the Republic of Moldova (PCRM).

In the summer of 2014, Muntean was excluded from the PCRM Executive Committee, then from the position of party executive secretary, and on 23 December 2014 he would be definitively excluded from the Communist Party. About his exclusion from the party, he later said "I was excluded from PCRM for leftist views ... although I am a true third-generation communist."

Known for his strong Moldovenist position, Muntean appeared in public at some rallies in a T-shirt that had inscribed on it Еу сынт молдован! Еу грэеск молдовенеште! (written in Moldovan Cyrillic: "I am Moldovan, I speak Moldovan!"). His brother Ivan Muntean is the leader of the obstastie association "I am Moldovan, I speak Moldovan". In 2019, together with Mark Tkaciuk, he founded the Collective Action Party – Civic Congress.
