= Alternative (political bloc) =

Alternative Alternativa
- Abbreviation: BA; BeA
- Parliamentary group leader: Gaik Vartanean
- Founder: Ion Ceban; Alexandr Stoianoglo; Ion Chicu; Mark Tkachuk
- Founded: 31 January 2025
- Ideology: Social democracy; Anti-corruption; Disputed: Pro-Europeanism
- Political position: Centre to centre-left
- Continental affiliation: Unified European Left Group
- Member parties: PDCM
- Colours: Green
- Parliament: 7 / 101
- District presidents: 3 / 32

Website
- https://bloculalternativa.md/

Alternative (Romanian: Blocul politic „Alternativa” or Blocul electoral „Alternativa”, lit. '"Alternative" political bloc' or '"Alternative" electoral bloc', BA or BeA) is a political alliance in Moldova founded in 2025 by incumbent Mayor of Chișinău Ion Ceban, 2024 presidential candidate Alexandr Stoianoglo, former Prime Minister Ion Chicu, and former MP Mark Tkachuk. On 10 April 2026, one of its members, the National Alternative Movement (MAN), withdrew from the bloc, followed by the Common Action Party – Civil Congress (PAC–CC) on 15 April.

The alliance presented itself as pro-European and claimed to consider European integration to be a major objective for Moldova. Its real commitment to pro-Europeanism has been disputed, with TVP World stating that the bloc was regarded by the European Union (EU) and the ruling Party of Action and Solidarity (PAS) in Moldova as a "Trojan horse" designed to stall Moldova's accession talks to the EU "from within". The Carnegie Endowment for International Peace described these accusations as a campaign tactic from PAS, which would have sought to present itself as the single viable pro-European force.

== Member parties ==
The members of the bloc initially were the National Alternative Movement (MAN), the Party of Development and Consolidation of Moldova (PDCM), and the Common Action Party – Civil Congress (PAC–CC), as well as a number of independent politicians. However, on 10 April 2026, MAN leader, Ion Ceban, has announced the party's departure from the bloc, while remaining in the bloc's faction in the Parliament of Moldova. At a time shortly after the bloc's founding, the PDCM was the bloc member with the most developed party network in Moldova of the three, having for instance obtained over 5% of votes in local and district councils at the 2023 local elections in comparison to MAN which obtained under 2% and the PAC–CC which obtained even less.

Party	Abbr.	Leader	Ideology	Position	List seats	Elected MPs
Party of Development and Consolidation of Moldova	PDCM	Ion Chicu	Christian democracy	Centre to centre-right	32 / 106	2 / 8
Independents	Ind.	Alexandr Stoianoglo	Nonpartisan		9 / 106	2 / 8

== Former members ==
Party	Abbr.	Leader	Ideology	Position	List seats	Elected MPs	Member until
National Alternative Movement	MAN	Ion Ceban	Social democracy	Centre-left	55 / 106	3 / 8	10 April 2026
Common Action Party – Civil Congress	PAC–CC	Mark Tkachuk; Iurie Muntean	Democratic socialism	Left-wing	10 / 106	1 / 8	15 April 2026

== Positions ==
According to its leaders, the four pillars of the bloc's political program are pro-Europeanism, economic liberalisation, neutrality, and national reunification. Despite its economic liberalism, it also supports strong social welfare programs, specifically in support of families, the elderly, children, and people with autism or ADHD. Additionally, the bloc advocates for sustainable development and environmental sustainability.

According to its website, the Alternative bloc promotes a political platform based on human values, respect for diversity, professionalism in defending the public interest, and openness to sustainable international partnerships. The bloc views European integration as Moldova's most important constructive challenge, seeing it as a path to lasting development and national unity.

In its manifesto, Alternative stated that European Union (EU) membership was only possible for Moldova after the reintegration of its Russian-backed unrecognized breakaway region of Transnistria; the EU had already clarified that resolving the Transnistria conflict would not be a precondition for accession. Alternative also argued that EU accession was only possible once Moldova's neutrality had been "consolidated" despite neutrality being already enshrined in the Constitution of Moldova and the EU not being a military alliance. According to Balkan Insight, the framing of this issue mirrored Russian propaganda, which deliberately blurred the line between EU accession and NATO membership.

On the day of the bloc's founding, Ceban stated "So that there are no questions, we advocate for European integration as a major objective of the country. We speak and write in the Romanian language. We know that there is a war and an aggression in the East against Ukraine. And our focus must be on the needs of the people, of our citizens."

On the national identity question, the bloc positions itself as anti-Moldovenist without advocating for the unification of Moldova and Romania. However, despite this position, the bloc has announced its willingness to collaborate with all other political parties, including unionist ones.

Media outlets have variously called the bloc centrist or centre-left. According to Moldovan political analyst Valeriu Pașa, it is seeking to occupy the political space formerly held by the Democratic Party of Moldova (PDM) prior to its electoral collapse in the 2021 parliamentary election. For its part, the Institut français des relations internationales (Ifri) think tank stated that Alternative sought to attract what it described the "neither-nor" electorate, i.e. neither Russia nor the West.

=== Accusations of false pro-Europeanism ===
In an article for Deutsche Welle, Moldovan journalist Vitalie Călugăreanu described the Alternative bloc as "false pro-Europeans". He pointed out the past affiliations of its leaders with the Party of Communists of the Republic of Moldova (PCRM) and stated that, according to political analysts, if the bloc were to enter the parliament, its goal would be to torpedo Moldova's accession into the EU from within.

Călugăreanu pointed out that, in 2014, Ceban protested in Brussels against the signing of the Moldova–European Union Association Agreement; he also promoted that year the 2014 Gagauz referendums on Gagauzia's independence and its accession into the Russia-led Eurasian Customs Union. In February 2024, Ceban stated that he did not regret his communist and socialist past and that he had always been sincere. According to Moldovan political analyst Ion Tăbârță, since assuming the leadership of his party, the MAN, Ceban sought to move from the left-wing parties in which he began and consolidated his political career, the PCRM and the Party of Socialists of the Republic of Moldova (PSRM), to the right of the spectrum. However, as Tăbârță stated, Ceban and the MAN tended to be viewed questionably by right-wing parties, especially by the then ruling Party of Action and Solidarity (PAS); these considered him a Russian "Trojan horse" with the aim of taking part of the pro-European vote according to Tăbârță.

As for the other leaders of the bloc, Călugăreanu pointed out Stoianoglo's poor knowledge of the Romanian language and that he was supported by the pro-Russian vote in the 2024 presidential election; that Chicu was Minister of Finance during Moldovan oligarch Vladimir Plahotniuc's regime and advisor and later Prime Minister to pro-Russian President Igor Dodon, having in the past blamed European officials for "the disaster the Republic of Moldova has reached"; and that Tkachuk was an advisor to president Vladimir Voronin, of the PCRM, and that in 2014, after he left the PCRM, Tkachuk advocated for a referendum on Moldova's accession to the Eurasian Customs Union. In his term as parliament member from 2009 to 2014, Stoianoglo was part of the Alliance for European Integration. On 10 September 2025, Tkachuk stated that the 2003 Kozak memorandum to turn Moldova into a federation should have been signed. The memorandum aimed to make Russian an official language in Moldova, allow the stationing of Russian troops in the country for 20 years and award Transnistria and Gagauzia veto power in the Parliament of Moldova. Tkachuk's declaration sparked a protest by dozens of Transnistrian War veterans two days later.

With regards to the 2024 Moldovan European Union membership constitutional referendum, the MAN registered as a participant in the referendum, supporting the "yes" option. Meanwhile, even though the PDCM signed the Pact for Europe, a multi-party agreement aimed at promoting Moldova's European integration, the party boycotted the referendum. Stoianoglo did not participate in the referendum either, stating that this decision was "not because he opposes the European integration of the Republic of Moldova" but because he was "against the current government [of the PAS]". Tkachuk did not publicly comment on the referendum, and the PAC–CC's program did not mention European integration as of shortly after Alternative's formation.

According to Tăbârță, Russia sought to gain control over political decisions in Chișinău through Alternative following the 2025 Moldovan parliamentary election regardless of the coalition government formed after them, even if it were a declaredly pro-European one; the latter would allow it to influence the pace of EU accession negotiations. According to Moldovan political analyst Andrei Curăraru, Alternative would be part of a three-tiered game by Russia, with each playing its perfectly calibrated role: Alternative would address the disillusioned pro-European segment, the PSRM would appeal to the traditional pro-Russian electorate and Ilan Shor would be "the middleman, the man without ideology, but with money".

Despite these accusations, the Carnegie Endowment for International Peace's Russia Eurasia Center has stated that there is no evidence of the bloc being pro-Russian or supported by Russia in a way comparable to Shor or the PSRM, and has claimed that such accusations are an attempt on the part of the ruling Party of Action and Solidarity (PAS) to present itself as the only viable pro-European party.

== History and elections ==
On 11 August 2025, the bloc presented its electoral list for the upcoming parliamentary election to the Central Electoral Commission of Moldova (CEC). Ceban is the list's lead candidate, however he has stated that he intends to refuse his seat if elected and remain the Mayor of Chișinău. He is followed by Stoianoglo, Chicu, Tkachuk, and the sole incumbent Alternative MP, Gaik Vartanean. Overall, the National Alternative Movement holds a majority of candidates on the list.

On 24 September, four days before the parliamentary election, 200 election ballots with a "voted" stamp marked for the Alternative bloc were found in a printing shop in Chișinău by the city's police. Prime Minister Dorin Recean and the Moldovan authorities described a Russian-backed "carousel-type scheme" for electoral fraud under which the ballots were allegedly to be used: a paid voter would insert a fake ballot into the ballot box, a clean official one marked with the same political formation as the fake one would be taken out of the polling station, and it would then be used by the next paid voter. Ceban stated that the ballots were models for campaign advertising, demanded a public apology from the police and stated that the publication of images with pre-stamped ballots was a "PAS-brand lie in full complicity with state bodies". Nevertheless, the CEC stated that the ballots did not fulfill publicity law requirements and that they constituted electoral agitation and de facto misleading advertising, given, as CEC vice president Pavel Postica stated, the difficulty for a simple voter to distinguish between a real ballot and a printed one. Further, Minister of Education and Research Dan Perciun stated that Alternative's models looked identical to real ballots.

== Election results ==
=== Parliament ===
Election	Leader	Performance					Rank	Government
Election	Leader	Votes	%	± pp	Seats	+/–	Rank	Government
2025	Ion Ceban	125,706	7.96%	New	8 / 101	New	3rd	Opposition

== Reactions ==
Igor Grosu, president of the governing Party of Action and Solidarity, has accused the bloc of being pro-Russian. Meanwhile, bloc leader Ion Ceban has accused PAS of not doing enough to bring Moldova into the European Union.

Dodon, president of the opposition PSRM, has welcomed the creation of the bloc as an alternative to PAS for the pro-European and pro-Romanian electorate, while reaffirming his and his party's opposition to these positions.

Tudor Ulianovschi, president of the European Social Democratic Party (previously known as Democratic Party of Moldova), stated that his party had not been invited and that "it is important to see the actions, not just the statements." PSDE and MAN previously planned to merge.

Irina Vlah, president of the Heart of Moldova Republican Party, called on the alliance to sign a declaration committing not to support PAS.

== See also ==
- Platform for Life and Peace – a pro-European parliamentary group in Ukraine formed by former members of the pro-Russian Opposition Platform — For Life
