= Socialist Party of Moldova =

Socialist Party of Moldova Partidul Socialist din Moldova
- Abbreviation: PSM
- President: Vladimir Dorojko
- Founder: Victor Morev; Valeriu Senic
- Founded: 11 August 1992
- Headquarters: 35A Vasile Alecsandri Street, Chișinău
- Ideology: Socialism; Moldovenism; Russophilia
- Political position: Left-wing
- European affiliation: Unified European Left

Website
- www.spm.md

The Socialist Party of Moldova (Romanian: Partidul Socialist din Moldova) is a socialist political party in Moldova. It came second in the 1994 parliamentary election in alliance with the Unity Movement for Equality in Rights, the successor of the Pan-Soviet anti-independence movement in Moldova and supported by the then-unregistered Party of Communists of the Republic of Moldova.

In 1997, a faction split from the party and founded the Party of Socialists of the Republic of Moldova (PSRM), which would later become a major party in Moldovan politics.

At the 2005 parliamentary election on 6 March, the party formed the Electoral Bloc Motherland together with PSRM, but won no seats.
