= Party of Development and Consolidation of Moldova =

Party of Development and Consolidation of Moldova Partidul Dezvoltării și Consolidării Moldovei
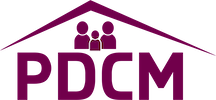
- Abbreviation: PDCM
- Leader: Ion Chicu
- Secretary: Liliana Iaconi
- Founder: Ion Chicu
- Founded: 31 March 2021
- Registered: 17 April 2021
- Headquarters: 36/1 București Street, Chișinău
- Membership (2025): 2,801
- Ideology: Christian democracy Pro-Europeanism (claimed)
- Political position: Centre to centre-right
- National affiliation: Alternative
- Colours: Purple
- Slogan: Împreună pentru Țară ('Together for the Country"
- Parliament: 2 / 101
- District presidents: 3 / 32
- Mayors: 48 / 898

Website
- pdcm.md

The Party of Development and Consolidation of Moldova (Romanian: Partidul Dezvoltării și Consolidării Moldovei, PDCM) is a political party in Moldova led by former Prime Minister Ion Chicu.

== History ==
On 31 March 2021, Ion Chicu announced in his telegram channel about the creation of a new political project: the "Party of Development and Consolidation of Moldova".

On 17 April 2021, the party successfully passed the registration procedure.

In May 2021, the party announced that it would participate in the 2021 parliamentary election. On 12 June 2021, the party was registered for the elections under number 12.

In the election, the party received 0.43% of the vote. 6,311 citizens of Moldova voted for this political party.

At the end of August 2022, party leader Ion Chicu welcomed the initiative of the founder of the Democratic Party of Moldova, Dumitru Diacov, to create a centrist bloc.

== Ideology ==
On 31 March 2021, Chicu stated that the main goal of the party was to create all conditions for the integration of the Republic of Moldova into the European Union (EU).

On 17 April 2021, Ion Chicu called the party a political formation that shares a Christian democratic political doctrine with a centrist to centre-right orientation.

== Leadership ==
- President – Ion Chicu
- Vice Presidents – Anatol Usatîi, Ion Mărgineanu, Alexandru Holostenco, Diana Dicusari, Lilia Ignatiuc, Ion Cojocari, Svetlana Nastas, and Oleg Cosîh.
- Secretary General – Liliana Iaconi

== Election results ==
=== Presidential ===
Election	Candidate	First round		Second round		Result
Election	Candidate	Votes	%	Votes	%	Result
2024	Ion Chicu	31,797	2.06%	Against Maia Sandu		Lost ✗

=== Parliament ===
Election	Leader	Performance					Rank	Government
Election	Leader	Votes	%	± pp	Seats	+/–	Rank	Government
2021	Ion Chicu	6,315	0.43%	New	0 / 101	New	12th	Extra-parliamentary
2025	Ion Chicu	125,706	7.96% (Alternative)	▲7.53	8 / 101	▲8	▲3rd	Opposition

=== Local elections ===
==== Mayors ====
Year of elections	Mayors	% of votes	No. seats	+/–
2023	48	5.36	48 / 898	
