= National Alternative Movement =

Political party in Moldova

National Alternative Movement Mișcarea Alternativa Națională
- Abbreviation: MAN
- Leader: Ion Ceban
- Parliamentary group leader: Gaik Vartanean
- Founder: Ion Ceban
- Founded: 22 December 2022
- Registered: 17 January 2023
- Headquarters: 23/7 Petru Movilă Street, Chișinău
- Membership (2025): 4,248
- Ideology: Social democracy Pro-Europeanism (Note: Alternative's true commitment to pro-Europeanism is questioned by multiple media sources and political analysts) (claimed; disputed); Russophilia (alleged)
- Political position: Centre
- National affiliation: Alternative (2025–2026)
- Parliament: 3 / 101
- District Presidents: 0 / 32
- Mayors: 1 / 518

Website
- alternativa.eu

The National Alternative Movement (Romanian: Mișcarea Alternativa Națională, MAN) is a political party in Moldova. It was created at the end of December 2021. The party is led by Chișinău Mayor Ion Ceban.

The party is in opposition to the current government of the Republic of Moldova.

== Party history ==
In December 2021, Ceban announced the creation of the National Alternative Movement. On 21 December 2022, the founding congress of the party was held. Ceban officially announced the registration of the party on 17 January 2023.

In 2022, the State Department of the United States added MAN to its sanction list over its ties to Russian authorities.

== Ideology ==
Ceban argues that the doctrine of the MAN party "is social democratic according to the European type", and the formation proposes to make European integration a national idea. However, Alternative, to which MAN formerly belonged, has also been accused of harbouring pro-Russian viewpoints, and is viewed by the European Union as "a Trojan horse designed to stall accession talks from within."

In his statement, made during Youth forum, Ceban condemned the Russo-Ukrainian War and the aggression of Russia, stating that Moldova stands with Ukraine and supports its territorial integrity and sovereignty.

== Electoral history ==
In these elections, the MAN Party presented candidates mostly in the municipality of Chisinau. Thus, Ion Ceban has been nominated as a candidate for the position of Mayor General of Chisinau, together with a list of 57 candidates for the position of municipal councilors. At the same time, 13 candidates were put forward for the position of mayors in the suburbs of Chisinau together with teams of advisers. In the other five suburbs, only teams of councilors were nominated, given that the MAN Party supported the current mayors, even if they were independent or nominated by other parties, arguing that they are professional mayors, good administrators who deserve and must run their town halls in continuation.

Thus, Ion Ceban won in the first round elections, for the first time in the history of Chisinau, with a score of 50.62% (132,803 votes) and the Party took the highest score in the Municipal Council, 33.25% (85,553 votes), entering the Municipal Council with 20 mandates. At the same time, MAN candidates were elected mayor from MAN in several localities in Chisinau, in Vatra and Colonița in the first round, in Cricova and Bubuieci in the second round.

== Election results ==
=== Parliament ===
Election	Leader	Performance					Rank	Government
Election	Leader	Votes	%	± pp	Seats	+/–	Rank	Government
2025	Ion Ceban	125,706	7.96% (Alternative)	New	8 / 101	New	3rd	Opposition
