= Party of Socialists of the Republic of Moldova =

Political party in Moldova

Party of Socialists of the Republic of Moldova Partidul Socialiștilor din Republica Moldova
- Abbreviation: PSRM
- Leader: Igor Dodon
- Parliamentary group leader: Igor Dodon
- Founders: Veronica Abramciuc; Eduard Smirnov
- Founded: 29 June 1997; 29 years ago
- Split from: Socialist Party of Moldova
- Headquarters: 148 Columna Street, Chișinău
- Newspaper: Socialists
- Youth wing: Young Guard
- Membership (2025): 9,787
- Ideology: Democratic socialism Socialism; Social conservatism Moldovenism; Russophilia; Euroscepticism
- Political position: Left-wing
- National affiliation: Bloc of Communists and Socialists (2021–2025); Patriotic Electoral Bloc (2025)
- International affiliation: Sovintern (since 2026)
- Colours: Red (official); Maroon (customary)
- Parliament: 17 / 101 (17%)
- District Presidents: 9 / 32 (28%)
- Mayors: 144 / 898 (16%)

Website
- socialistii.md

The Party of Socialists of the Republic of Moldova (Romanian: Partidul Socialiștilor din Republica Moldova, PSRM) is a democratic socialist political party in Moldova. A populist party, it holds Eurosceptic and Russophilic views, both of which are reflected by its long-time leader and former Moldovan president Igor Dodon. It is contrasted to like-minded centre-left European parties for its conservative views on social issues, reflecting the country's strong social conservatism and the influence of the Moldovan Orthodox Church.

Between 2005 and 2011, it was known as the Party of Socialists of Moldova "Motherland" (Partidul Socialiștilor din Moldova «Patria-Rodina», PSMPR). In 2021, the Electoral Bloc of Communists and Socialists was formed with the Party of Communists of the Republic of Moldova with the aim of joint participation in the 2021 Moldovan parliamentary election. The party is pro-Russian, opposing Moldova's membership in the European Union and NATO.

== History ==
The PSRM was founded in 1997 by members of the Socialist Party of Moldova. The founding congress took place on 29 June 1997 in Chișinău. Veronica Abramciuc and Eduard Smirnov were elected as co-chairmen of the new party.

The party obtained 0.59% of votes in 1998 Moldovan parliamentary election, failing to elect any representative. In 2001 Moldovan parliamentary election, the party formed the electoral bloc Unity with the Republican Party of Moldova; it obtained 0.46% of votes, failing to elect any representative. In 2006 elections the party formed the Electoral Bloc Motherland with the Socialist Party of Moldova; the bloc obtained 4.9% of votes and did not elect any representatives. The party did not participate in 2009 and 2010 parliamentary elections, endorsing the Party of Communists of the Republic of Moldova (PCRM). Party chairman Veronica Abramciuc was included in PCRM list and elected to the Parliament of the Republic of Moldova. In 2011, Igor Dodon, former member of the PCRM, joined the party, and was elected as its chairman on 18 December 2011. Subsequently, a Socialist Group, which included Dodon, Veronica Abramciuc, and Zinaida Greceanîi, was set up in parliament.

The party won the 2014 Moldovan parliamentary election with over 20% of the vote. The party remained in opposition, as two centre-right, pro-EU parties managed to form a minority government (Gaburici Cabinet) with the external support of the PCRM.

In the 2016 Moldovan presidential election, Dodon was elected as the new President of Moldova. Following the election, Dodon stepped down as party chairman and was replaced by Zinaida Greceanîi. After being defeated in the 2020 Moldovan presidential election, Dodon returned as the party's chairman. For the 2021 Moldovan parliamentary election, it formed an electoral alliance (Electoral Bloc of Communists and Socialists) with the PCRM, which was defeated by the liberal, centre-right Party of Action and Solidarity. In December 2023, PSRM joined incumbent president Maia Sandu's pro-European Action and Solidarity Party to secure the two-thirds majority needed to dismiss Octavian Armașu as governor of the National Bank of Moldova. The dismissal was scrutinised by the International Monetary Fund and European Commission as a course for concern over the state of central bank independence in the country.

== Political positions ==
The Party of Socialists of the Republic of Moldova is the ideological successor of the Unity Movement for Equality in Rights. It is considered democratic socialist. It is placed on the left wing of the political spectrum, holding socialist stances on fiscal issues, socially conservative views on socio-cultural issues, and anti-NATO, anti-European Union, and pro-Russian stances. Party members support naming the state language Moldovan. Mariana Vasilache, journalist of the Romanian Radio Broadcasting Company, has described the party as a promoter of Moldovenism. Despite their support for Moldovan sovereignty, several party members and Members of the Parliament, such as Alla Dolință, Anatolie Labuneț, Adrian Lebedinschi, Corneliu Furculița, Ghenadi Mitriuc, and Radu Mudreac, have Romanian citizenship.

Reflecting the country's strong social conservatism, the party promotes family values and opposes LGBT rights, which is in contrast to left-leaning parties in the rest of Europe. In 2016, the party organized the Family Festival/March to counter-protest the "Without Fear" March organized by GENDERDOC-M in Chișinău. Some Moldovan and Romanian journalists have described the party as authoritarian. Critics also claim that PSRM-affiliated media promotes fake news and pro-Russian propaganda.

In 2015, Igor Dodon stated that he wanted the PSRM to join the Socialist International. In April 2021, the party submitted a request to join the organisation.

The PSRM claims that the Western world and Ukraine are responsible for the Russo-Ukrainian War. Some journalists also labelled the party as anti-Western.

In April 2025, party leader Dodon declared his intention to rename the party to the Party of Sovereignists of the Republic of Moldova (Romanian: Partidul Suveraniștilor din Republica Moldova, keeping the abbreviation PSRM), claiming that the party's ideology is closer to sovereignism and conservatism than to socialism. Accordingly, in October 2025, the party declared its intention to join the eurosceptic and national-conserative Patriots for Europe group, departing from its previous attempts to join socialist or social-democratic international organisations.

The party considers Hungary's right-wing conservative Fidesz and Slovakia's left-wing conservative Smer–SD to be its closest European allies. This is despite the fact that the Fidesz-led Hungarian government had previously attempted to ban socialist and communist symbols, including PSRM's logo, the red star.

== Members of the Executive Committee ==
The Executive Committee consists of:

- Igor Dodon – President; Chair of the parliamentary faction
- Vlad Batrîncea – Vice President of the Parliament
- Olga Cebotari – MP
- Grigore Novac – MP
- Adela Răileanu – MP
- Vladimir Odnostalco – MP; Secretary of the Parliamentary faction
- Alla Pilipețcaia – MP
- Grigorii Uzun – MP
- Ecaterina Medvedeva
- Zinaida Greceanîi – Honorary President; Deputy Chair of the parliamentary faction

== Party leaders ==
- Eduard Smirnov and Veronica Abramciuc (co-chairs, 1997–2005)
- Veronica Abramciuc (2005–2011)
- Igor Dodon (2011–2016)
- Zinaida Greceanîi (2016–2020)
- Igor Dodon (2020–2021)
- position abolished (2021–2024)
- Igor Dodon (2024–present)

== Election results ==
The PSRM participated in the Moldovan parliamentary elections in 1998 and 2001 without success. In the 2005 Moldovan parliamentary election, the party contested as part of the Electoral Bloc Motherland and received 4.97% votes, which was not sufficient to enter parliament as it did not pass the electoral threshold of 6.0%. At the April–July 2009 and the 2010 parliamentary elections, it supported the Party of Communists of the Republic of Moldova (PCRM). Its leader Veronica Abramciuc was included on the PCRM candidates list.

=== Parliament ===
Parliament of the Republic of Moldova
Election	Leader	Performance					Rank	Government
Election	Leader	Votes	%	± pp	Seats	+/–	Rank	Government
1998	Veronica Abramciuc; Eduard Smirnov	9,514	0.59%	New	0 / 101	New	12th	Extra-parliamentary (ADR: CDM-PDMP-PFD)
1998	Veronica Abramciuc; Eduard Smirnov	9,514	0.59%	New	0 / 101	New	12th	Extra-parliamentary (ADR: CDM–PDMP–PFD)
1998	Veronica Abramciuc; Eduard Smirnov	9,514	0.59%	New	0 / 101	New	12th	Extra-parliamentary (independents)
2001	Veronica Abramciuc; Eduard Smirnov	7,277	0.46% Unity Bloc (PSRM-PRM)	▼0.13	0 / 101	0	▼15th	Extra-parliamentary (PCRM)
2005	Veronica Abramciuc; Eduard Smirnov	77,490	4.97% (Motherland)	▲4.51	0 / 101	0	▲4th	Extra-parliamentary (PCRM)
2005	Veronica Abramciuc; Eduard Smirnov	77,490	4.97% (Motherland)	▲4.51	0 / 101	0	▲4th	Extra-parliamentary (PCRM)
2009 (April)	Veronica Abramciuc	did not contest						Extra-parliamentary (PCRM)
2009 (July)	Veronica Abramciuc	did not contest						Extra-parliamentary (AIE: PLDM-PDM–PL–AMN)
2010	Veronica Abramciuc	did not contest						Extra-parliamentary (AIE: PLDM-PDM-PL)
2010	Veronica Abramciuc	did not contest						Opposition (CPE: PLDM–PDM–PLR)
2014	Igor Dodon	327,912	20.51%	▲20.51	25 / 101	▲21	▲1st	Opposition (APME: PLDM–PDM)
2014	Igor Dodon	327,912	20.51%	▲20.51	25 / 101	▲21	▲1st	Opposition (AIE III: PLDM-PDM–PL)
2014	Igor Dodon	327,912	20.51%	▲20.51	25 / 101	▲21	▲1st	Opposition (PDM–PPEM–PL)
2019	Zinaida Greceanîi	441,191	31.15%	▲10.64	35 / 101	▲10	1st	Coalition (ACUM: (PAS–PPPDA)–PSRM)
2019	Zinaida Greceanîi	441,191	31.15%	▲10.64	35 / 101	▲10	1st	Coalition (PSRM–PDM)
2019	Zinaida Greceanîi	441,191	31.15%	▲10.64	35 / 101	▲10	1st	Minority government (PSRM)
2021	Igor Dodon	398,678	27.17% (BECS)	▼3.98	22 / 101	▼13	▼2nd	Opposition (PAS super majority government)
2025	Igor Dodon	381,505	24.17% (BEP)	▼3.00	17 / 101	▼5	2nd	Opposition (PAS majority government)

=== Presidency ===
President of Moldova
Election	Candidate	First round		Second round		Result
Election	Candidate	Votes	%	Votes	%	Result
2001	Extra-parliamentary					Lost ✗
2005	Extra-parliamentary					Lost ✗
2009 (May–June)	Extra-parliamentary					No winner
2009 (November–December)	Extra-parliamentary					No winner
2011–2012	Endorsed Nicolae Timofti	62 (Note: President was elected by 101 members of Parliament)	61.39%			Elected ✓
2016	Igor Dodon	680,550	47.98%	834,081	52.11%	Elected ✓
2020	Igor Dodon	439,866	32.61%	690,614	42.28%	Lost ✗
2024	Endorsed Alexandr Stoianoglo	401,726	25.98%	750,370	44.65%	Lost ✗

=== Local elections ===
==== District and municipal councils ====
Year of elections	No. votes	% of votes	No. seats
2019	291.257	27.08	326 / 1,116
2023			

==== Mayors ====
Year of elections	Mayors	% of votes	No. seats	+/–
2019	206	22.9	206 / 898	
2023	144	16.1	144 / 898	▼62
