= Second Tarlev Cabinet =

Government of Moldova

The Second Tarlev Cabinet was the Cabinet of Moldova from 19 April 2005 to 31 March 2008. It was the second government led by Vasile Tarlev who was the Prime Minister of Moldova from 2001 to 2008.

== Composition ==
=== Ministers ===
Title	Image	Name	Party	Term start	Term end
Prime Minister		Vasile Tarlev	PCRM	19 April 2001	31 March 2008
First Deputy Prime Minister		Zinaida Greceanîi	PCRM	10 October 2005	31 March 2008
Deputy Prime Minister		Valerian Cristea	PCRM	19 April 2001	15 November 2006
Deputy Prime Minister		Vitalie Vrabie	PCRM	15 November 2006	16 July 2007
Deputy Prime Minister		Victor Stepaniuc	PCRM	16 January 2008	25 September 2009
Deputy Prime Minister, Minister of Foreign Affairs		Andrei Stratan	PCRM	4 February 2004	25 September 2009
Minister of Economy and Trade		Valeriu Lazăr	Independent	19 April 2005	18 September 2006
Minister of Economy and Trade		Igor Dodon	PCRM	18 September 2006	14 September 2009
Minister of Agriculture and Food Industry		Anatolie Gorodenco	PCRM	19 April 2005	25 September 2009
Minister of Industry and Infrastructure		Vladimir Antosii	Independent	19 April 2005	31 March 2008
Minister of Finance		Zinaida Greceanîi	PCRM	26 February 2002	10 October 2005
Minister of Finance		Mihail Pop	Independent	10 October 2005	31 March 2008
Minister of Ecology and Natural Resources		Constantin Mihăilescu	Independent	19 March 2004	27 February 2008
Minister of Ecology and Natural Resources		Violeta Ivanov	PCRM	27 February 2008	11 September 2009
Minister of Local Public Administration		Vitalie Vrabie	PCRM	25 May 2006	16 June 2007
Minister of Local Public Administration		Valentin Guznac	PCRM	16 July 2007	10 June 2009
Minister of Justice		Victoria Iftodi	Independent	8 July 2004	20 September 2006
Minister of Justice		Vitalie Pîrlog	PCRM	20 September 2006	25 September 2009
Minister of Internal Affairs		Gheorghe Papuc	PCRM	27 February 2002	31 March 2008
Minister of Defense		Valeriu Pleșca	MPSFN	29 December 2004	11 June 2007
Minister of Defense		Vitalie Vrabie	PCRM	16 July 2007	25 September 2009
Minister of Reintegration		Vasilii Șova	PCRM	12 December 2002	11 September 2009
Minister of Transport and Roads Infrastructure		Miron Gagauz	Independent	19 April 2005	23 January 2007
Minister of Transport and Roads Infrastructure		Vasile Ursu	PCRM	23 January 2007	1 October 2008
Minister of Education and Youth		Victor Țvircun	Independent	19 April 2005	31 March 2008
Minister of Culture and Tourism		Artur Cozma	PCRM	19 April 2005	1 December 2008
Minister of Informational Development		Vladimir Molojen	PCRM	19 April 2005	31 March 2008
Minister of Social Protection, Family and Child		Galina Balmoș	Independent	22 January 2007	11 September 2009
Minister of Health		Valerian Revenco	Independent	19 April 2005	8 November 2005
Minister of Health		Ion Ababii	Independent	8 November 2005	31 March 2008

=== Ex officio members ===
Governor of Gagauzia. The Başkan (Governor) of Gagauzia is elected by universal, equal, direct, secret and free suffrage on an alternative basis for a term of 4 years. One and the same person can be a governor for no more than two consecutive terms. The Başkan of Gagauzia is confirmed as a member of the Moldovan government by a decree of the President of Moldova.

Title	Image	Name	Party	Term start	Term end
Governor of Gagauzia		Gheorghe Tabunșcic	PCRM	9 November 2002	29 December 2006
Governor of Gagauzia		Mihail Formuzal	Independent	16 January 2007	23 March 2015
President of the Academy of Sciences of Moldova		Gheorghe Duca	PDM	24 August 2004	28 November 2018

Preceded by First Tarlev Cabinet	Cabinet of Moldova; 19 April 2005 - 31 March 2008	Succeeded by First Greceanîi Cabinet
