= First Greceanîi Cabinet =

Government of Moldova

The First Greceanîi Cabinet was the Cabinet of Moldova from 31 March 2008 to 10 June 2009. It was the first government led by Zinaida Greceanîi who was Prime Minister of Moldova from 2008 to 2009.

== Composition ==
=== Ministers ===
| Title | Image | Name | Party | Term start | Term end |
|---|---|---|---|---|---|
| Prime Minister | | Zinaida Greceanîi | PCRM | 31 March 2008 | 14 September 2009 |
| First Deputy Prime Minister, Minister of Economy and Trade | | Igor Dodon | PCRM | 31 March 2008 | 14 September 2009 |
| Deputy Prime Minister for Issues of Corruption, Migration and Human Trafficking | | Valentin Mejinschi | PCRM | 21 October 2008 | 10 June 2009 |
| Deputy Prime Minister, Minister of Foreign Affairs | | Andrei Stratan | PCRM | 4 February 2004 | 25 September 2009 |
| Deputy Prime Minister | | Victor Stepaniuc | PCRM | 16 January 2008 | 25 September 2009 |
| Minister of Construction and Regional Development | | Vladimir Baldovici | PCRM | 31 March 2008 | 25 September 2009 |
| Minister of Agriculture and Food Industry | | Anatolie Gorodenco | PCRM | 19 April 2005 | 25 September 2009 |
| Minister of Finance | | Mariana Durleșteanu | PCRM | 31 March 2008 | 14 September 2009 |
| Minister of Ecology and Natural Resources | | Violeta Ivanov | PCRM | 27 February 2008 | 11 September 2009 |
| Minister of Local Public Administration | | Valentin Guznac | PCRM | 16 July 2007 | 10 June 2009 |
| Minister of Justice | | Vitalie Pîrlog | PCRM | 20 September 2006 | 25 September 2009 |
| Minister of Internal Affairs | | Valentin Mejinschi | PCRM | 31 March 2008 | 21 October 2008 |
| Minister of Internal Affairs | | Gheorghe Papuc | PCRM | 21 October 2008 | 25 September 2009 |
| Minister of Defense | | Vitalie Vrabie | PCRM | 16 July 2007 | 25 September 2009 |
| Minister of Reintegration | | Vasilii Șova | PCRM | 12 December 2002 | 11 September 2009 |
| Minister of Transport and Roads Infrastructure | | Vasile Ursu | PCRM | 23 January 2007 | 1 October 2008 |
| Minister of Education and Youth | | Larisa Șavga | PCRM | 31 March 2008 | 25 September 2009 |
| Minister of Culture and Tourism | | Artur Cozma | PCRM | 19 April 2005 | 1 December 2008 |
| Minister of Informational Development | | Pavel Buceațchi | PCRM | 31 March 2008 | 25 September 2009 |
| Minister of Social Protection, Family and Child | | Galina Balmoș | PCRM | 22 January 2007 | 11 September 2009 |
| Minister of Health | | Larisa Catrinici | PCRM | 31 March 2008 | 25 September 2009 |

=== Ex officio members ===
Governor of Gagauzia. The Başkan (Governor) of Gagauzia is elected by universal, equal, direct, secret and free suffrage on an alternative basis for a term of 4 years. One and the same person can be a governor for no more than two consecutive terms. The Başkan of Gagauzia is confirmed as a member of the Moldovan government by a decree of the President of Moldova.

| Title | Image | Name | Party | Term start | Term end |
|---|---|---|---|---|---|
| Governor of Gagauzia | | Mihail Formuzal | PRM | 16 January 2007 | 23 March 2015 |
| President of the Academy of Sciences of Moldova | | Gheorghe Duca | PDM | 24 August 2004 | 28 November 2018 |

| Preceded by Second Tarlev Cabinet | Cabinet of Moldova; 31 March 2008 - 10 June 2009 | Succeeded by Second Greceanîi Cabinet |
