= Second Greceanîi Cabinet =

Government of Moldova

The Second Greceanîi Cabinet was the Cabinet of Moldova from 10 June to 25 September 2009. It was the second government of Zinaida Greceanîi who was Prime Minister of Moldova from 2008 to 2009.

== Composition ==
=== Ministers ===
Title	Image	Name	Party	Term start	Term end
Prime Minister		Zinaida Greceanîi	PCRM	31 March 2008	14 September 2009
First Deputy Prime Minister, Minister of Economy and Trade		Igor Dodon	PCRM	31 March 2008	14 September 2009
Deputy Prime Minister		Iurie Roșca	PPCD	16 June 2009	25 September 2009
Deputy Prime Minister		Victor Stepaniuc	PCRM	16 January 2008	25 September 2009
Deputy Prime Minister, Minister of Foreign Affairs		Andrei Stratan	PCRM	4 February 2004	25 September 2009
Minister of Construction and Regional Development		Vladimir Baldovici	PCRM	31 March 2008	25 September 2009
Minister of Agriculture and Food Industry		Anatolie Gorodenco	PCRM	19 April 2005	25 September 2009
Minister of Finance		Mariana Durleșteanu	PCRM	31 March 2008	14 September 2009
Minister of Ecology and Natural Resources		Violeta Ivanov	PCRM	27 February 2008	11 September 2009
Minister of Local Public Administration		Iacov Timciuc	PCRM	10 June 2009	25 September 2009
Minister of Justice		Vitalie Pîrlog	PCRM	20 September 2006	25 September 2009
Minister of Internal Affairs		Gheorghe Papuc	PCRM	21 October 2008	25 September 2009
Minister of Defense		Vitalie Vrabie	PCRM	16 July 2007	25 September 2009
Minister of Reintegration		Vasilii Șova	PCRM	12 December 2002	11 September 2009
Minister of Education and Youth		Larisa Șavga	PCRM	31 March 2008	25 September 2009
Minister of Culture and Tourism		Mihail Barbulat	PCRM	10 June 2009	25 September 2009
Minister of Informational Development		Pavel Buceațchi	PCRM	31 March 2008	25 September 2009
Minister of Social Protection, Family and Child		Galina Balmoș	PCRM	22 January 2007	11 September 2009
Minister of Health		Larisa Catrinici	PCRM	31 March 2008	25 September 2009

=== Ex officio members ===
Governor of Gagauzia. The Başkan (Governor) of Gagauzia is elected by universal, equal, direct, secret and free suffrage on an alternative basis for a term of 4 years. One and the same person can be a governor for no more than two consecutive terms. The Başkan of Gagauzia is confirmed as a member of the Moldovan government by a decree of the President of Moldova.

Title	Image	Name	Party	Term start	Term end
Governor of Gagauzia		Mihail Formuzal	PRM	16 January 2007	23 March 2015
President of the Academy of Sciences of Moldova		Gheorghe Duca	PDM	24 August 2004	28 November 2018

Preceded by First Greceanîi Cabinet	Cabinet of Moldova; 10 June - 25 September 2009	Succeeded by First Filat Cabinet
