= Valerian Cristea =

Moldovan politician

Deputy Mayor of Orhei
- In office 7 July 2015 – 10 December 2025
- Preceded by: Ala Savin

Moldovan Ambassador to the Czech Republic
- In office 16 January 2007 – 21 November 2009
- President: Vladimir Voronin; Mihai Ghimpu (acting)
- Prime Minister: Vasile Tarlev; Zinaida Greceanîi; Vitalie Pîrlog (acting); Vladimir Filat
- Preceded by: Mihail Laur
- Succeeded by: Ștefan Gorda

Deputy Prime Minister of Moldova
- In office 19 April 2001 – 15 November 2006
- President: Vladimir Voronin
- Prime Minister: Vasile Tarlev
- Preceded by: Lidia Guțu
- Succeeded by: Vitalie Vrabie

Member of the Moldovan Parliament
- In office 22 March 1998 – 19 April 2001
- Succeeded by: Semion Dragan
- Parliamentary group: Party of Communists

Personal details
- Born: 1 August 1950 (age 75) Vîprova, Moldavian SSR, Soviet Union

Valerian Cristea (born 1 August 1950) is a Moldovan politician and diplomat. In 1998, Cristea was elected to the Parliament of Moldova as a Party of Communists of the Republic of Moldova candidate and was re-elected in 2001. He was the Deputy Prime Minister from 2001 to 2006. He was also the ambassador of Moldova to the Czech Republic from 2007 to 2009. Cristea studied at the Technical University of Moldova.
