= Vladimir Țurcan =

Moldovan politician (born 1954)

Major general Vladimir Ţurcan OR
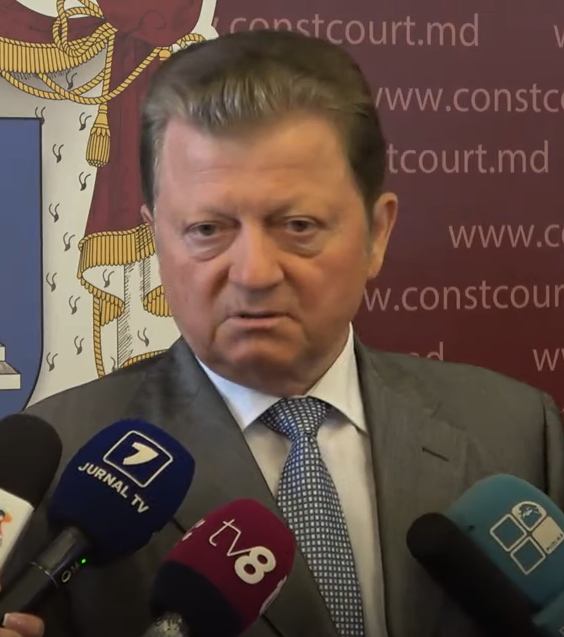
- Țurcan in 2019

Judge of the Constitutional Court
- In office 16 August 2019 – 17 August 2025
- Succeeded by: Sergiu Litvinenco

President of the Constitutional Court
- In office 19 August 2019 – 23 April 2020
- Preceded by: Mihai Poalelungi
- Succeeded by: Domnica Manole

Member of the Moldovan Parliament
- In office 9 December 2014 – 4 September 2019
- Succeeded by: Alla Darovannaia
- Parliamentary group: Party of Socialists
- In office 17 March 2005 – 24 December 2010
- Parliamentary group: Party of Communists
- In office 13 March 2001 – 25 April 2002
- Parliamentary group: Party of Communists

First Vice President of the Moldovan Parliament
- In office 12 May 2009 – 14 August 2009
- President: Vladimir Voronin
- Prime Minister: Zinaida Greceanîi
- Speaker: Vladimir Voronin
- Succeeded by: Serafim Urechean

Moldovan Ambassador to Russia, Finland, Kazakhstan, Turkmenistan and Armenia
- In office 21 March 2002 – 29 April 2005
- President: Vladimir Voronin
- Prime Minister: Vasile Tarlev
- Preceded by: Valeriu Bobuțac
- Succeeded by: Vasile Sturza

Minister of Internal Affairs
- In office 21 December 1999 – 19 April 2001
- President: Petru Lucinschi; Vladimir Voronin
- Prime Minister: Dumitru Braghiș
- Preceded by: Victor Catan
- Succeeded by: Vasile Drăgănel

First Deputy Minister of Internal Affairs
- In office 11 February 1997 – 21 December 1999
- President: Petru Lucinschi
- Prime Minister: Ion Ciubuc; Ion Sturza
- Minister: Mihail Plămădeală; Victor Catan

Personal details
- Born: 14 October 1954 (age 71) Slobozia, Moldavian SSR, Soviet Union (now Moldova)
- Party: United Moldova Party
- Education: Moscow State University

Vladimir Țurcan (born 14 October 1954) is a Moldovan jurist and former politician.

== Biography ==
Vladimir Țurcan was born on 14 October 1954 and in the town of Slobozia, Moldavian SSR, Soviet Union (now Moldova). In 1976 he graduated from Faculty of Law at Moscow State University. In 1985, he graduated from the Kyiv Institute of Political Science and Social Management. In 1988, he graduated from the Kyiv Higher Party School. From 1976 to 1982, he investigator in the Prosecutor's Office of the MSSR. From 1986 to 1990, he was a deputy of the Supreme Soviet of Moldova. In the early 90s, he was General Director of the Moldavian-Belarusian enterprise Zubr. On 11 February 1997, he was appointed First Deputy Minister of the Interior. He held the position until 21 December 1999. On 21 March 2002, he was appointed as the Ambassador of Moldova to Russia. He was also concurrently appointed as Ambassador to Finland. He would later hold the posts of ambassador to Kazakhstan, Turkmenistan and Armenia. On 16 August 2019, he was appointed president of the Constitutional Court of Moldova.

He was also a member of the Parliament of Moldova from 2005 to 2010 and from 2014 to 2019.
