= Valentin Guznac =

Moldovan politician (born 1961)

Member of the Moldovan Parliament
- In office 14 August 2009 – 28 November 2010
- Parliamentary group: Party of Communists

Minister of Local Public Administration
- In office 16 July 2007 – 10 June 2009
- President: Vladimir Voronin
- Prime Minister: Vasile Tarlev; Zinaida Greceanîi
- Preceded by: Vitalie Vrabie
- Succeeded by: Iacob Timciuc

Deputy Minister of Local Public Administration
- In office 5 July 2006 – 16 July 2007
- President: Vladimir Voronin
- Prime Minister: Vasile Tarlev
- Minister: Vitalie Vrabie

Personal details
- Born: October 24, 1961 (age 64) Corlăteni, Moldavian SSR, Soviet Union
- Party: Democratic Party of Moldova
- Other political affiliations: United Moldova Party

Valentin Guznac (born 24 October 1961) is a Moldovan politician, who served as local public administration minister (2007–09). He has represented Moldova at the United Nations as Deputy Secretary General of the State Chancellary of the Government of Moldova.

== Biography ==
Valentin Guznac was born on October 24, 1961, in the village of Corlăteni, Rîșcani District. After graduating from the middle school in his native village, he enrolled in 1979 as a student at the Faculty of Mechanics of the Polytechnic Institute "Serghei Lazo" in Chișinău (now known as the Technical University of Moldova). He also graduated from the Academy of Public Administration alongside the President of the Republic of Moldova and the Baltic Institute of Economics, Ecology and Law in Saint Petersburg.

He has been a member of the Parliament of Moldova since 2009.
