= Boris Gămurari =

Moldovan politician and diplomat (born 1946)

Corps general Boris Gămurari
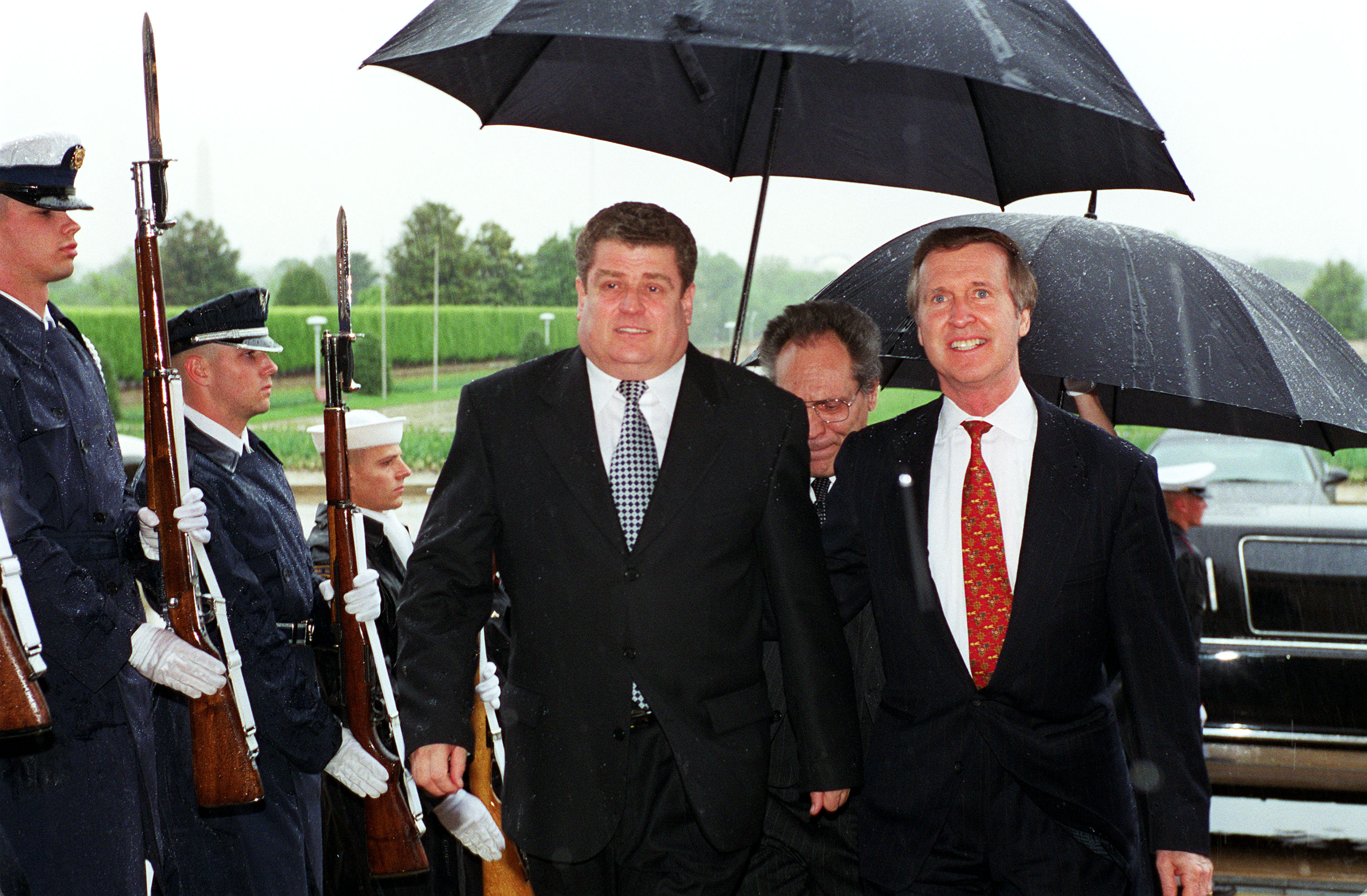
- Gămurari (left) in 2000

Moldovan Ambassador to Poland
- In office 19 October 2005 – 12 June 2009
- President: Vladimir Voronin
- Prime Minister: Vasile Tarlev; Zinaida Greceanîi
- Preceded by: Eugen Carpov
- Succeeded by: Valentin Mejinschi

Minister of Defense
- In office 11 May 1999 – 19 April 2001
- President: Petru Lucinschi; Vladimir Voronin
- Prime Minister: Ion Sturza; Dumitru Braghiș
- Preceded by: Valeriu Pasat
- Succeeded by: Victor Gaiciuc

Personal details
- Born: 1 December 1946 (age 79) Văscăuți, Moldavian SSR, Soviet Union

Boris Gămurari (born 1 December 1946) is a Moldovan politician and diplomat who served as Minister of Defense of Moldova from 1999 until 2001.
