= Vasile Drăgănel =

Major general Vasile Drăgănel

Minister of Internal Affairs
- In office 19 April 2001 – 27 February 2002
- President: Vladimir Voronin
- Prime Minister: Vasile Tarlev
- Preceded by: Vladimir Țurcan
- Succeeded by: Gheorghe Papuc

Personal details
- Born: 10 September 1962 Hoginești, Moldavian SSR, Soviet Union

Vasile Drăgănel (born 10 September 1962) is a Moldovan police general who held the office of Minister of Internal Affairs of Moldova in the First Vasile Tarlev Cabinet.
