= Svetlana Rusu =

Moldovan politician (born 1972)

Member of the Moldovan Parliament
- In office 22 April 2009 – 28 December 2010
- Parliamentary group: Party of Communists

Personal details
- Born: 9 April 1972 (age 54) Roşietici, Moldavian SSR, Soviet Union
- Party: Democratic Party of Moldova
- Other political affiliations: United Moldova Party; Party of Communists of the Republic of Moldova

Svetlana Rusu (born 9 April 1972) is a Moldovan politician.

Se has served as a member of the Parliament of Moldova since 2009. In 2010, Svetlana Popa left the Party of Communists of the Republic of Moldova. She was a member of Democratic Party of Moldova and United Moldova Party.
