= Ștefan Gorda =

Moldovan diplomat (born 1960)

Ştefan Gorda
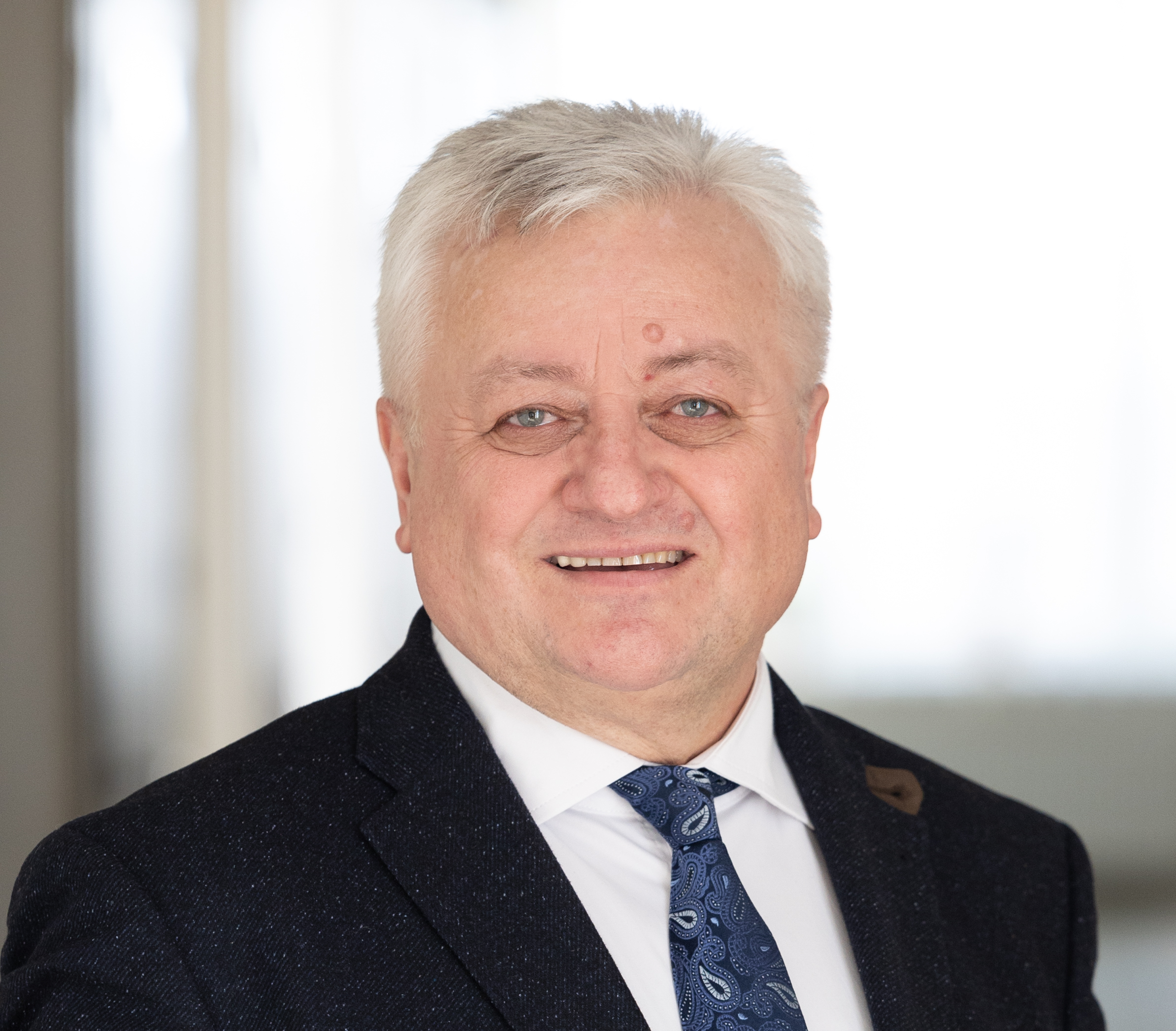
- Gorda in 2025

1st Moldovan Ambassador to Kazakhstan
- In office 14 March 2025 – 2 February 2026
- President: Maia Sandu
- Prime Minister: Dorin Recean; Alexandru Munteanu
- Succeeded by: Igor Moldovan

Moldovan Ambassador to Bulgaria, Albania and North Macedonia
- In office 3 February 2016 – 26 February 2020
- President: Nicolae Timofti; Igor Dodon
- Prime Minister: Pavel Filip; Maia Sandu; Ion Chicu
- Preceded by: Alexandru Prigorschi
- Succeeded by: Anatol Cebuc

Moldovan Ambassador to the Czech Republic
- In office 21 June 2010 – 16 June 2015
- President: Mihai Ghimpu (acting); Vlad Filat (acting); Marian Lupu (acting); Nicolae Timofti
- Prime Minister: Vlad Filat; Iurie Leancă; Chiril Gaburici
- Preceded by: Valerian Cristea
- Succeeded by: Vitalie Rusu

Personal details
- Born: 11 January 1960 (age 66) Chernivtsi, Ukrainian SSR, Soviet Union
- Education: Moldova State University; Gubkin Russian State University of Oil and Gas; École nationale d'administration
- Profession: Diplomat

Ştefan Gorda (born 11 January 1960) is a Moldovan diplomat.
