= Victor Stepaniuc =

Moldovan historian and politician (born 1958)

Victor Stepaniuc OR
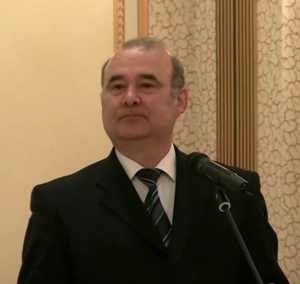
- Stepaniuc in 2012

Member of the Moldovan Parliament
- In office 29 July 2009 – 28 December 2010
- Parliamentary group: Party of Communists; United Moldova Party
- In office 20 March 1996 – 16 January 2008
- Preceded by: Artiom Lazarev
- Parliamentary group: Socialist Party; Party of Communists

Deputy Prime Minister of Moldova
- In office 16 January 2008 – 25 September 2009
- President: Vladimir Voronin; Mihai Ghimpu (acting)
- Prime Minister: Vasile Tarlev; Zinaida Greceanîi; Vitalie Pîrlog (acting)
- Preceded by: Vitalie Vrabie

Personal details
- Born: 13 July 1958 (age 68) Costești, Moldavian SSR, Soviet Union (now Moldavia)
- Other political affiliations: Party of Communists of the Republic of Moldova; Communist Party of Moldova
- Education: Universitatea de Stat din Moldova
- Profession: professor, jurist

Victor Stepaniuc (born 13 July 1958) is a Moldovan politician.

He has been a member of the Parliament of Moldova since 1996 until 2010. He served several times as Leader of Parliament Commission for Education, Youth, Culture and Sports (1998-2001), leader of Communist Fraction in Parliament (2001-2005) and another mandate as Leader of Parliament Commission for Education, Culture and Sports (2005-2008).
