= Alexandru Jizdan =

Moldovan politician (born 1975)

Major general Alexandru Jizdan
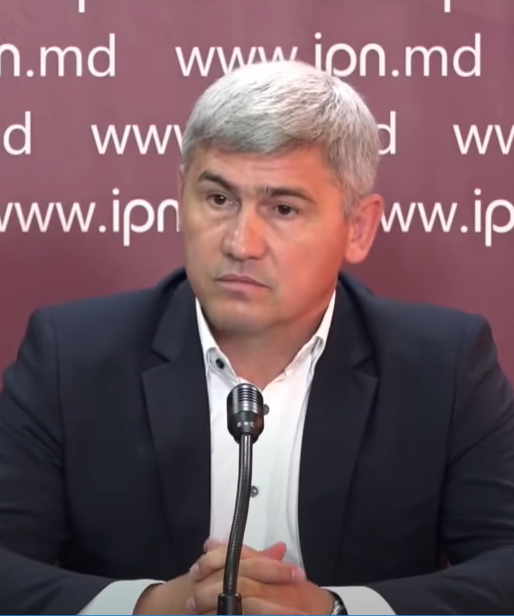
- Jizdan in 2021

Member of the Moldovan Parliament
- In office 9 March 2019 – 23 July 2021
- Parliamentary group: Democratic Party
- Constituency: Anenii Noi
- Majority: 12,123 (41.4%)

Minister of Internal Affairs
- In office 20 January 2016 – 8 June 2019
- President: Nicolae Timofti; Igor Dodon
- Prime Minister: Pavel Filip
- Preceded by: Oleg Balan
- Succeeded by: Andrei Năstase

Deputy Director of the Security and Intelligence Service
- In office 14 October 2015 – 29 January 2016
- Preceded by: Vadim Vrabie
- Succeeded by: Alexandru Bălan

Personal details
- Born: 13 June 1975 (age 51) Geamăna, Moldavian SSR, Soviet Union
- Education: Ștefan cel Mare Police Academy; Academy of Public Administration of Moldova

Alexandru Jizdan (born 13 June 1975) is a Moldovan politician and police officer who served as Minister of Internal Affairs of Moldova from 2016 to 2019 in the Filip Cabinet. Previously he worked in various positions in structures of Interior Ministry, and in 2015-2016 worked as deputy director of Information and Security Service of the Republic of Moldova. After the April 2009 protests in Moldova he was awarded by the then-minister Gheorghe Papuc for executing well the orders. From 9 March 2019, the MP of the DPM in the Parliament of the Republic of Moldova.

== Education ==
Alexandru Jizdan graduated from the Police Academy "Ștefan cel Mare" in 1997. In 2007-2008, he did the post-graduation studies at the Academy of Public Administration of the President of the Republic of Moldova.

== Professional activity ==
=== Activity within the structures of the MIA, 1997-2014 ===
- 1997 – 1999, Inspector within Department of organized crime and corruption control, within the General Police Inspectorate, Chișinău, Republic of Moldova;
- 1999 – 2001, Senior Inspector, Department for organized crime and corruption control, within the General Police Inspectorate, Chișinău, Republic of Moldova;
- 2001 – 2002, Main Inspector, Department for organized crime and corruption control, within the General Police Inspectorate, Chișinău, Republic of Moldova;
- November 2002 - December 2002, Head of Department of combating of organized crime within the General Department of judicial police of the General Police Inspectorate, Chișinău, Republic of Moldova;
- 2002 – 2005, Head of Service within General Department of judicial police, Ministry of Internal Affairs, Chișinău, Republic of Moldova;
- 2003 – 2005, Head of General Department of judicial police, Ministry of Internal Affairs, Chișinău, Republic of Moldova;
- August 2005 - December 2005, Senior Inspector for exceptional cases, within General Department of judicial police, Ministry of Internal Affairs, Chișinău, Republic of Moldova;
- 2005 – 2006, Head of Unit, within General Department of judicial police, Ministry of Internal Affairs, Chișinău, Republic of Moldova;
- 2006 – 2007, Deputy Chief, Division of criminal police of the Department of operational services, Ministry of Internal Affairs, Chișinău, Republic of Moldova;
- 2007 – 2008, Deputy Head, Department of Operational Services, Ministry of Internal Affairs, Chișinău, Republic of Moldova;
- 2008 – 2010, Head, Department of Operational Services, Ministry of Internal Affairs, Chișinău, Republic of Moldova;
- 2010 – 2014, Chief, General Department of operational services, Ministry of Internal Affairs, Chișinău, Republic of Moldova.

=== Deputy Director of the Security and Intelligence Service ===
From 2015 to 2016, Alexandru Jizdan was the Deputy Head, Information and Security Service of the Republic of Moldova.

=== Minister of Internal Affairs ===
In January 2016, Alexandru Jizdan came back to the Ministry of Internal Affairs, in the position of the Minister of the institution. In August 2016, at the proposal of Prime Minister Pavel Filip, he was promoted to the General rank. The President Nicolae Timofti signed the decree.

On 23–25 November 2016, the delegation of the Ministry of Internal Affairs, headed by the Minister Alexandru Jizdan, held an official working visit to the Ministry of the Interior, Lithuania. The purpose of the visit was to share the partnership and improve the experience exchange and good practices. In July 2016, Alexandru Jizdan and his Lithuanian counterpart, Tomas Žilinskas, signed in Chișinău a cooperation and mutual assistance agreement in the field of prevention and reaction in exceptional situations, and the Civil Protection and Exceptional Situations Service benefited from a donation of 10 special vehicles for the intervention in exceptional situations.

On 12 April 2017 the Minister Alexandru Jizdan met with the delegation of the State of Qatar and the Ambassador of the State of Qatar in the Republic of Moldova, E. S. Mohammed Bin Ali Mohammed Al-Maliki. The meeting was focused on: capacity building in the field of combating cross-border crime, information analysis and combating terrorism, taking over the Qatari party's experience and transferring know-how regarding the creation of the Training Center for the law enforcement agencies of the Ministry of Defence, sharing and strengthening institutional capacities to increase security at the airport and to identify joint assistance and cooperation projects that will generate consolidated results.

On 5 January 2019 Alexandru Jizdan officially announced his candidacy for the next parliamentary elections on 24 February 2019. He relieved from the Minister's duties and suspended from the position of minister, during the election campaign.

On 25 March 2019 the minister Alexandru Jizdan, signed the collaboration Agreement with Alexandru Bordea, founder of Evenda Company, to organize the free of charge training courses for developing the communication capacities of the MIA's representatives and the methods for improving the management within the subordinated structures.

== Political activity ==
Alexander Jizdan has won the MP's mandate at the electoral constituency no. 34, Anenii Noi, within the Democratic Party of Moldova in the Parliament of the Republic of Moldova at the Parliamentary elections held on 24 February 2019. At the last congress of the DPM held on 7 September 2019, he was selected the secretary general of the party.

== Personal life ==
Aexandru Jizdan is married with Nelea Jizdan (Croitoru) and has 3 children: Bogdan, Mihai and Răzvan.
