= General Inspectorate for Emergency Situations =

The General Inspectorate for Emergency Situations is a government agency with firefighting, civil defence and occupational safety in Romania and Moldova.

- General Inspectorate for Emergency Situations (Romania)
- General Inspectorate for Emergency Situations (Moldova)

== See also ==
- Ministry of Emergency Situations
