= United Moldova Party =

United Moldova Party Partidul Moldova Unită
- President: Vladimir Ţurcan
- Founded: May 21, 2005
- Headquarters: Chişinău, Moldova

Website
- moldovaunita.md

The United Moldova Party (Romanian: Partidul Moldova Unită) is a political party in Moldova.

== History ==
The party was formed on May 21, 2005 in Chişinău.

The "Moldova Unită" Party of Spiritual Development won 0.22% at April 2009 Moldovan parliamentary election.

In June 2009 decided to stand for July 2009 Moldovan parliamentary election on the ticket of the Social Democratic Party (Moldova) headed by Dumitru Braghiş.

In 2010, the group of MPs of the United Moldova Party comprised the five lawmakers who defected from the Communists Party at the end of 2009. These are: Vladimir Ţurcan, Victor Stepaniuc, Ludmila Belcencova, Svetlana Rusu and Valentin Guznac. Victor Stepaniuc defected from the United Moldova Party on September 9, 2010.

== Notable people ==
- Victor Stepaniuc
- Anna Tcaci
