= Puținei =

Puținei may refer to several villages in Romania:

- Puținei, a village in Tălpaș Commune, Dolj County
- Puținei, a village in Izvoru Bârzii Commune, Mehedinți County

== See also ==
- Puțintei
