= Valentin Mejinschi =

Moldovan police general and politician (born 1967)

Major general Valentin Mejinschi

Moldovan Ambassador to Poland
- In office 2 September 2009 – 11 November 2009
- President: Vladimir Voronin; Mihai Ghimpu (acting)
- Prime Minister: Zinaida Greceanîi; Vitalie Pîrlog (acting); Vlad Filat
- Preceded by: Boris Gămurari
- Succeeded by: Iurie Bodrug

Deputy Prime Minister of Moldova for Issues of Corruption, Migration and Human Trafficking
- In office 21 October 2008 – 10 June 2009
- President: Vladimir Voronin
- Prime Minister: Zinaida Greceanîi

Minister of Internal Affairs
- In office 31 March 2008 – 21 October 2008
- President: Vladimir Voronin
- Prime Minister: Zinaida Greceanîi
- Preceded by: Gheorghe Papuc
- Succeeded by: Gheorghe Papuc

Personal details
- Born: 24 January 1967 (age 59) Corotna, Moldavian SSR, Soviet Union

Valentin Mejinschi (born 24 January 1967) is a Moldovan police general and former politician. He held the office of Minister of Internal Affairs of Moldova in 2008 and Deputy Prime Minister from 2008 to 2009.

== Notes ==
- "Valentin Mejinschi CV". Ministry of Internal Affairs of Moldova (in Romanian). Archived from the original on 2008-07-06.
