= Gheorghe Papuc =

Moldovan politician (born 1954)

Lieutenant general Gheorghe Papuc

Minister of Internal Affairs
- In office 27 October 2008 – 25 September 2009
- President: Vladimir Voronin; Mihai Ghimpu (acting)
- Prime Minister: Zinaida Greceanîi; Vitalie Pîrlog (acting)
- Preceded by: Valentin Mejinschi
- Succeeded by: Alexei Roibu
- In office 27 February 2002 – 31 March 2008
- President: Vladimir Voronin
- Prime Minister: Vasile Tarlev
- Preceded by: Vasile Drăgănel
- Succeeded by: Valentin Mejinschi

Personal details
- Born: 6 May 1954 (age 71) Frăsineşti, Moldavian SSR, Soviet Union
- Citizenship: Moldova; Russia
- Party: Party of Communists of the Republic of Moldova
- Other political affiliations: Communist Party of Moldova
- Profession: Jurist

Military service
- Allegiance: Soviet Union; Moldova
- Branch/service: Soviet Army; Trupele de Carabinieri
- Rank: General

Gheorghe Papuc (born 6 May 1954) is a Moldovan politician.

== Biography ==
He was born in early May in the city of Ungheni, an area west of Chișinău in the Moldovan SSR. After graduating from the high school in 1971, he enrolled in the Soviet Armed Forces. In 1978, he graduated from the Felix Dzherzhinsky Military High School in Saratov. After studying there, he began to enroll in a Russian law school. Papuc began to become more active in the Ministry of Internal Affairs of the Soviet Union. In 1991, he graduated from the Tashkent MVD High School (now the Academy of the Ministry of Internal Affairs of Uzbekistan). Between 1992 and 1997, Papuc held leading positions in the MAI of Moldova and the MVD in the Russian Federation, leading several detached units in the Kabardino-Balkaria. He returned to Moldova in 1997 to lead a special operations brigade in the armed forces. He became the Moldovan Minister of the Interior on 27 February 2002, and would serve in this position until 31 March 2008 and serve a second time from 27 October 2008 - 25 September 2009.
