= Galina Balmoș =

Moldovan politician (born 1961)

Social Issues Advisor to the President
- In office 19 November 2019 – 18 December 2020
- President: Igor Dodon
- Preceded by: Viorica Dumbrăveanu

Member of the Moldovan Parliament
- In office 14 August 2009 – 9 March 2019
- Parliamentary group: Party of Communists; Democratic Party
- In office 17 March 2005 – 22 January 2007
- Succeeded by: Vladimir Panfilov
- Parliamentary group: Party of Communists

Minister of Social Protection, Family and Child
- In office 22 January 2007 – 11 September 2009
- President: Vladimir Voronin
- Prime Minister: Vasile Tarlev; Zinaida Greceanîi
- Preceded by: Valerian Revenco
- Succeeded by: Valentina Buliga (as Minister of Labour, Social Protection and Family)

Personal details
- Born: 24 February 1961 (age 65) Pleșeni, Moldavian SSR, Soviet Union
- Education: Moldova State University

Galina Balmoș (born 24 February 1961) is a Moldovan politician. She held the office of Minister of Social Protection of Moldova from 2007 to 2009.
