= Violeta Ivanov =

Moldovan politician (born 1967)

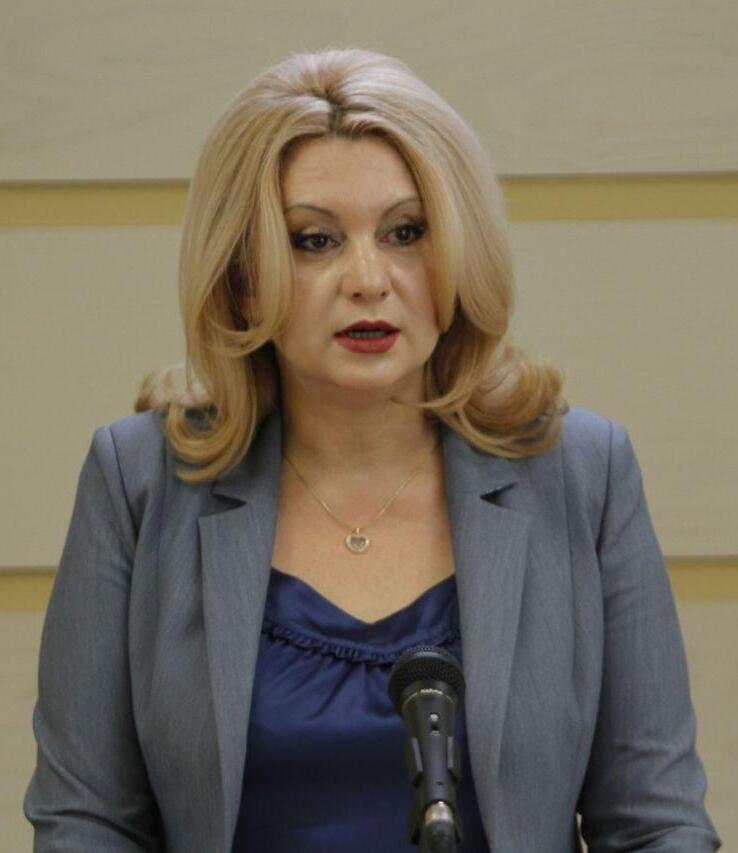
- Ivanov in 2020

Member of the Moldovan Parliament
- In office 22 April 2009 – 23 July 2021
- Parliamentary group: Party of Communists; Democratic Party; Șor Party

Minister of Ecology and Natural Resources
- In office 26 February 2008 – 11 September 2009
- President: Vladimir Voronin
- Prime Minister: Vasile Tarlev; Zinaida Greceanîi
- Preceded by: Constantin Mihăilescu
- Succeeded by: Gheorghe Șalaru

Deputy Minister of Ecology and Natural Resources
- In office 21 November 2007 – 26 February 2008
- President: Vladimir Voronin
- Prime Minister: Vasile Tarlev
- Minister: Constantin Mihăilescu

Personal details
- Born: 15 September 1967 (age 58) Grinăuți-Moldova, Moldavian SSR, Soviet Union
- Party: Șor Party (2020–present); Democratic (2017–2020); Communist (before 2015)

Violeta Ivanov (born 15 September 1967) is a Moldovan politician who currently served as Member of the Parliament of Moldova from 2009 to 2021.

Born in Grinăuți-Moldova, Ivanov served as Minister of the Ecology and Natural Resources of Moldova between 2008 and 2009. Between December 2014 and December 2015, she was president of Party of Communists of the Republic of Moldova (PCRM) faction in parliament.

In December 2015, together with other 13 PCRM deputies, she announced creation of Social-Democratic Platform for Moldova. Between 2007 and 2008 served as Deputy Minister of the Ecology and Natural Resources of Moldova.

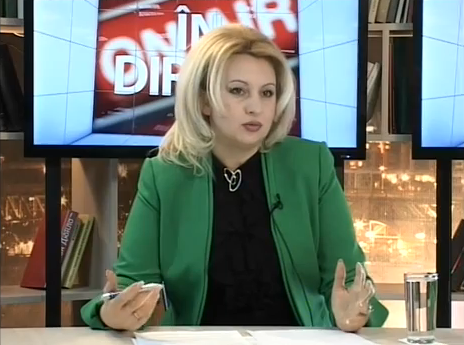
Ivanov in January 2014
