= Roșietici =

- Commune
- Location in Moldova
- Coordinates: 47°49′N 28°24′E
- Country: Moldova
- District: Florești District
- Elevation: 305 ft (93 m)

Population (2014)
  - Total: 2,186
- Time zone: UTC+2 (EET)
  - Summer (DST): UTC+3 (EEST)
- Postal code: MD-5036
- Area code: +373 250

Roșietici is a commune in Florești District, Moldova. It is composed of three villages: Cenușa, Roșietici and Roșieticii Vechi.

== Notable people ==
- Svetlana Rusu
