= Oleg Balan =

Moldovan jurist and politician (born 1969)

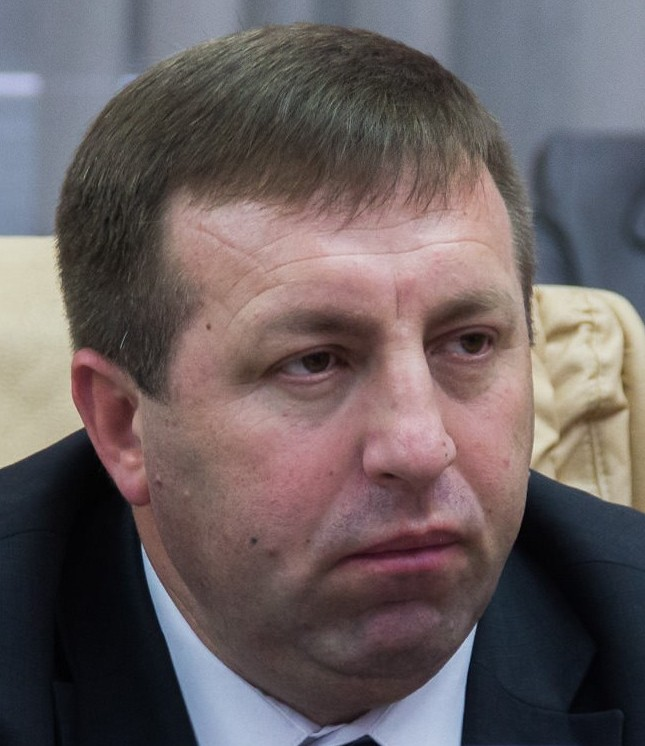
- Balan in 2015

Minister of Internal Affairs
- In office 18 February 2015 – 20 January 2016
- President: Nicolae Timofti
- Prime Minister: Chiril Gaburici; Natalia Gherman (acting); Valeriu Streleț; Gheorghe Brega (acting)
- Preceded by: Dorin Recean
- Succeeded by: Alexandru Jizdan

Member of the Moldovan Parliament
- In office 9 December 2014 – 18 February 2015
- Succeeded by: Aliona Goța
- Parliamentary group: Liberal Democratic Party

Personal details
- Born: 27 November 1969 (age 56) Cîrpești, Moldavian SSR, Soviet Union
- Education: Alexandru Ioan Cuza Police Academy; Babeș-Bolyai University
- Occupation: Politician, university teacher

Oleg Balan (born 27 November 1969) is a Moldovan politician who served as Minister of Internal Affairs of Moldova between 18 February 2015 and 20 January 2016.

From December 2014 until 18 February 2015 Oleg Balan was a Member of Parliament of Moldova, before being appointed as Minister of Internal Affairs of Moldova in the Gaburici Cabinet, replacing Dorin Recean in office. He served as Minister of Interior also in the next cabinet led by Valeriu Streleț, until, after a political crisis, the Filip Cabinet was inaugurated on 20 January 2016.

== Personal life ==
Oleg Balan is married and has two children. Aside Romanian he speaks Russian and French.

== Publications ==
Oleg Balan is author or co-author of 84 works, researches and communiques scientific on his specialty:

- Drept internațional public" (two volumes),
- Drept internațional umanitar",
- Drept comunitar",
- Drept internațional public" (2nd edition),
- Drept international public" (3rd edition),
- Terorismul - crima internațională",
- Terorism și antiterorism",
- Protecția drepturilor omului în conflictele armate".
