= Greceanîi Cabinet =

Zinaida Greceanîi Cabinet can refer to:

- First Greceanîi Cabinet
- Second Greceanîi Cabinet
