= Vitalie Vrabie =

Moldovan politician (born 1964)

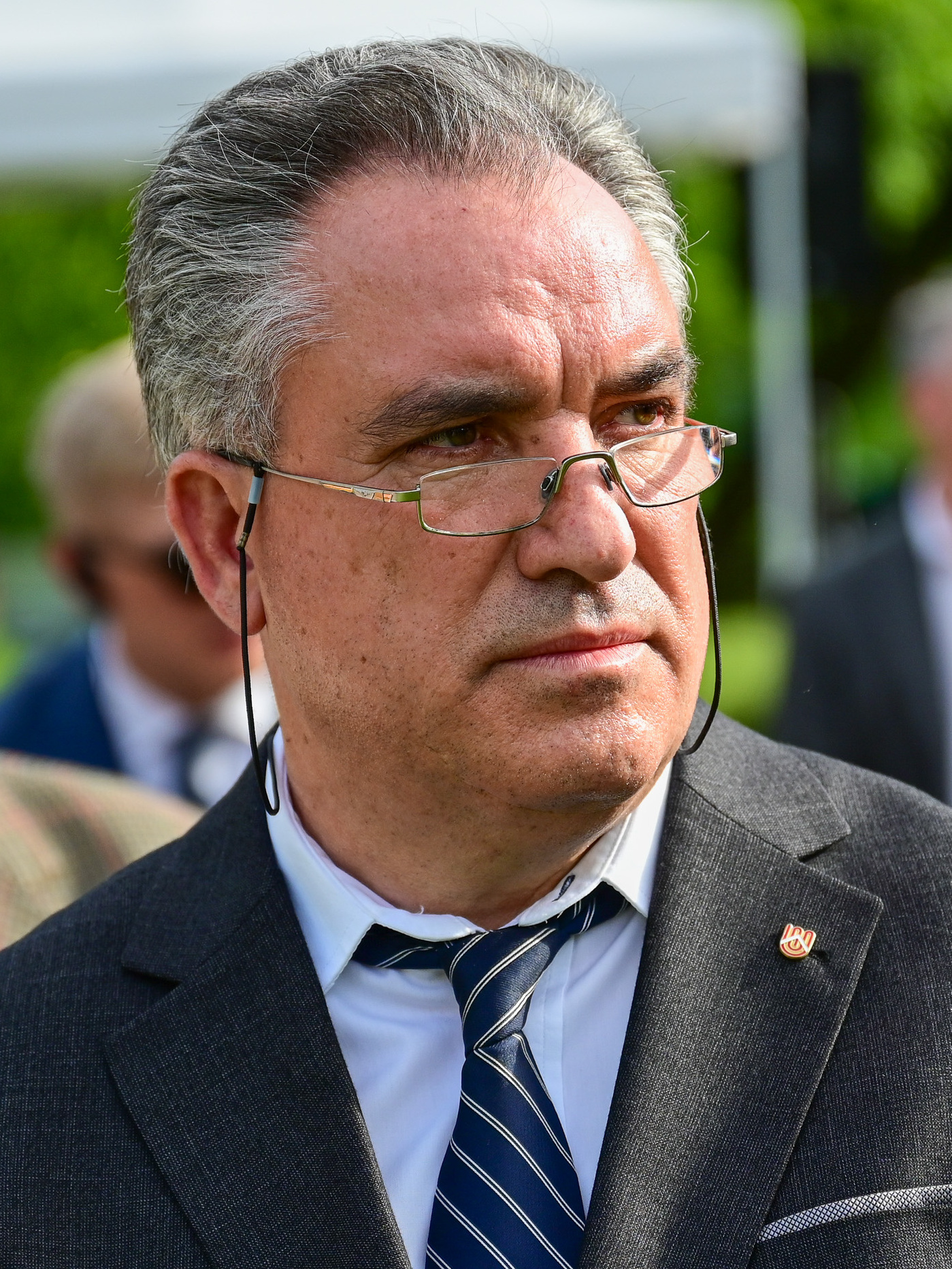
- Vrabie in 2024

Mayor of Ungheni
- Incumbent
- Assumed office 20 November 2023
- Preceded by: Alexandru Ambros
- In office 23 May 1999 – 26 May 2006
- Succeeded by: Alexandru Ambros

Minister of Defense
- In office 16 July 2007 – 25 September 2009
- President: Vladimir Voronin; Mihai Ghimpu (acting)
- Prime Minister: Vasile Tarlev; Zinaida Greceanîi; Vitalie Pîrlog (acting)
- Preceded by: Valeriu Pleșca
- Succeeded by: Vitalie Marinuța

Deputy Prime Minister of Moldova
- In office 15 November 2006 – 16 July 2007 Serving with Andrei Stratan
- President: Vladimir Voronin
- Prime Minister: Vasile Tarlev
- Preceded by: Valerian Cristea

Minister of Local Public Administration
- In office 25 May 2006 – 16 July 2007
- President: Vladimir Voronin
- Prime Minister: Vasile Tarlev
- Succeeded by: Valentin Guznac

Personal details
- Born: 2 October 1964 (age 61) Costuleni, Moldavian SSR, Soviet Union

Vitalie Mihai Vrabie (born 2 October 1964) is a Moldovan politician who previously served as Minister of Defense of Moldova from 2007 until 2009.

== Early life ==
Vitalie Mihai Vrabie was born on October 2, 1964, in the village of Costuleni in the Ungheni District. He graduated from the Faculty of Agronomy of the Agrarian University of Moldova in 1986, the Moscow Timiryazev Agricultural Academy specializing in management in 1992, and then the Academy of Public Administration under the President of the Republic of Moldova, specializing in international relations (2001). Member of the CPSU since 1986. After graduating from university, he worked as a chief agronomist in Ungheni. He then became director of the SA “Garant-impex” in Ungheni (1994–1999).

== Politics ==
During the same period, he entered politics, being elected councilor in the Ungheni City Council, director of the Ungheni branch of the Chamber of Commerce and Industry (1995–1999). In 1998, he ran for parliamentary elections on the lists of the “Furnica” bloc.

In 1999 he was elected, and in 2003 he was re-elected, as mayor of the city of Ungheni on the lists of the ruling party. In parallel with this activity, he also holds the position of President of the Association of Mayors and Local Communities of the Republic of Moldova, member of the Congress of Local and Regional Authorities of the Council of Europe, head of the national delegation to the Congress of Local and Regional Authorities of the Council of Europe (2003-2006).

On May 25, 2006, Vrabie was appointed Minister of Local Public Administration of the Republic of Moldova. Beginning on November 15, 2006, he also became Deputy Prime Minister. A little over a year later, he was of 16 July 2007 appointed Minister of Defense, a position he retained in the government formed by Zinaida Greceanîi on 31 March 2008. He resigned from the position on 14 September 2009. On June 12, 2010, VVrabie joined the Democratic Party of Moldova, and on January 9, 2011, he was elected as Secretary General of the PDM. On November 19, 2023, he became Mayor of Ungheni.

== Personal life ==
Vitalie Vrabie is fluent in Russian and English. He is married and has two children.
