= Cotiujeni =

- Village
- Location within Moldova
- Coordinates: 48°20′46″N 26°56′17″E
- Country: Moldova

Government
  - Mayor: Mihail Ursu

Population (2014 census)
  - Total: 3,406
- Time zone: UTC+2 (EET)
  - Summer (DST): UTC+3 (EEST)
- Postal code: MD-4722

Cotiujeni is a village in Briceni District, Moldova.
