= Bașcalia =

- Village
- Location in Moldova
- Coordinates: 46°18′N 28°47′E
- Country: Moldova
- District: Basarabeasca District

Population (2014 census)
  - Total: 2,872
- Time zone: UTC+2 (EET)
  - Summer (DST): UTC+3 (EEST)

Bașcalia (Bulgarian: Башкалия, romanized: Bashkaliya) is a village in Basarabeasca District, Moldova.

Bașcalia is a small village in the Southeast of the Republic of Moldova, about 100 km from the capital, Chișinău. It has about 2500 Romanian-speaking inhabitants.

The climate is Southeastern European continental, characterized by hot and dry summers and frosty winters with snow.

Predominant economic activity is agriculture - wheat and vineyards with Bordeaux-type red wines.

The village of Bașcalia was founded in between one of the latest waves of Russian colonization of newly separated from Țara Moldovei region - Bessarabia after 1812, which is easy to deduce from its missing in the lists of settlements in 1822 and already enlisted as a Bulgarian colony in 1827. The first list of inhabitants of Bașcalia in 1832 contained names of 32 families, from which about half were Bulgarians, but also Muntenians, Moldovans, and Gagauzians.

There are several legends about its name. One tells that the name of the region is derived from Bășcălie, a Romanian adjective that can mean dissonant or messy, and the story goes that in its initial stage, the village was formed by migrants from different regions, speaking different languages and dialects. They were predominantly Bulgarians in the process of colonization of Bessarabia by the Russian Empire), but also other ethnicities claiming they were Bulgarians too in order to benefit from offered land and protection from Ottomans, like Trans-Danubians - Romanians from Dobrogea and Muntenia, Gagauzians or Christianised Turks, Moldovans fugitives from North Bessarabia Boyars, etc. This is confirmed by the etymology of the lists of names from the first census of 1932: Tarlev and Zlatov – Bulgarians, Iabangi and Demergi – Gagauzians, Vornic – Romanians, etc.

Another saying is that the predominant ethnic group of Bulgarian colonists - refugees, at its foundation brought the name of their native village Bașcalia from the Varna Okrug of 19th-century Bulgaria – Western Black Sea coast, which was under fierce battles between Russian and Ottoman empires.

The third scenario is that newly established colonists developed their new settlement on a Bashca – a Tatar noun for the place with gardens, belonging to a previously living Tatarian village, which was repressed by Russians and deported to the deeper mainland of the Tsar Empire.

Nowadays, Bașcalia is heavily affected by migration, declining from about 5000 inhabitants in 1995 to about 2800 in 2014. In between, most Bașcalians migrated to the capital city of Chișinău, Italy, France, Germany, and Russia.
