= General Inspectorate for Emergency Situations (Moldova) =

Moldova government agency

Flag of the IGSU.

The General Inspectorate for Emergency Situations (Romanian: Inspectoratul General pentru Situații de Urgență, IGSU) is a Moldovan government agency subordinate to the Ministry of Internal Affairs.

== History ==
=== Origins ===
On 24 December 1991, President Mircea Snegur, by Decree No. 244 of December 24, 1991 "On the Civil Defense of the Republic of Moldova", decreed the transfer under the jurisdiction of the Republic of Moldova of the Civil Defense General Staff, its institutions and command bodies, as well as the military units of the Civil Defense of the USSR, deployed on the territory of the Moldavian Soviet Socialist Republic. The aforementioned decree established that all assets of all these subordinate institutions are the property of the Republic of Moldova.

=== Development ===
By decision of the Government on May 14, 1993, the Civil Defense General Staff was placed under the subordination of the Ministry of Defense. Then, by directive of the General Staff of the Armed Forces on September 1, 1993, the Civil Defense General Staff was reorganized into the Department of Civil Protection and Emergency Situations. Taking into account the fact that the civil protection system in most developed countries is separate from the Armed Forces, the decision was made on October 2, 1996 to transfer the department from the Armed Forces of the Republic of Moldova. On April 18, 2001, the name of the department was changed, becoming the Department of Emergency Situations. In connection with the approval of the new structure of public administration, on 23 April 2005, the Department of Emergency Situations is reorganized into the Ministry of Internal Affairs.

== Structure ==
- Regional Directorate for Coordination and Direction of Intervention
- Regional Search and Rescue Directorate No. 1
- Regional Search and Rescue Directorate No. 2
- Directorate for Ensuring Fire Safety at Objectives of Strategic Importance
- Republican Training Center
- Orchestra "Plai Moldovenesc"
- Special Objects 5101
- Special Objects 5102
- Directorate of Exceptional Situations, Chisinau Municipality
- Directorate of Exceptional Situations, Balti
- Municipality Directorate of Exceptional Situations
- Cahul Municipality Directorate of Exceptional Situations, Edinet Municipality
- Directorate of Exceptional Situations, Hincesti
- Municipality Directorate of Exceptional Situations, Orhei
- Municipality Directorate of Exceptional Situations, Soroca Municipality
- Directorate of Exceptional Situations, Ungheni Municipality
- Regional Directorate of Exceptional Situations, Gagauzia ATU
- Regional Directorate of Exceptional Situations, Causeni
- "Urban Reserve Command Point" Service
- "Extraurban Reserve Command Point" Service

== Heads ==
Name	Term start	Term end	Ref.
Major General Mihail Harabagiu	12 October 2007	12 January 2022	
Colonel Alexandru Oprea	13 January 2022	18 September 2025	
Colonel Aurel Baciu	18 September 2025	Present	

== See also ==
- Ministry of Emergency Situations
- Ministry of Internal Affairs (Moldova)
- Directorate-General for European Civil Protection and Humanitarian Aid Operations
