= Alexandru Prigorschi =

Moldovan diplomat

Moldovan Ambassador to Bulgaria
- In office 2010–2015

Personal details
- Born: 18/08/1958
- Profession: Diplomat

Alexandru Prigorschi is a diplomat from the Republic of Moldova. He is the Moldovan Ambassador to Bulgaria.
