= Ministry of Internal Affairs (Moldova) =

Government ministry of Moldova

- Ministerul Afacerilor Interne
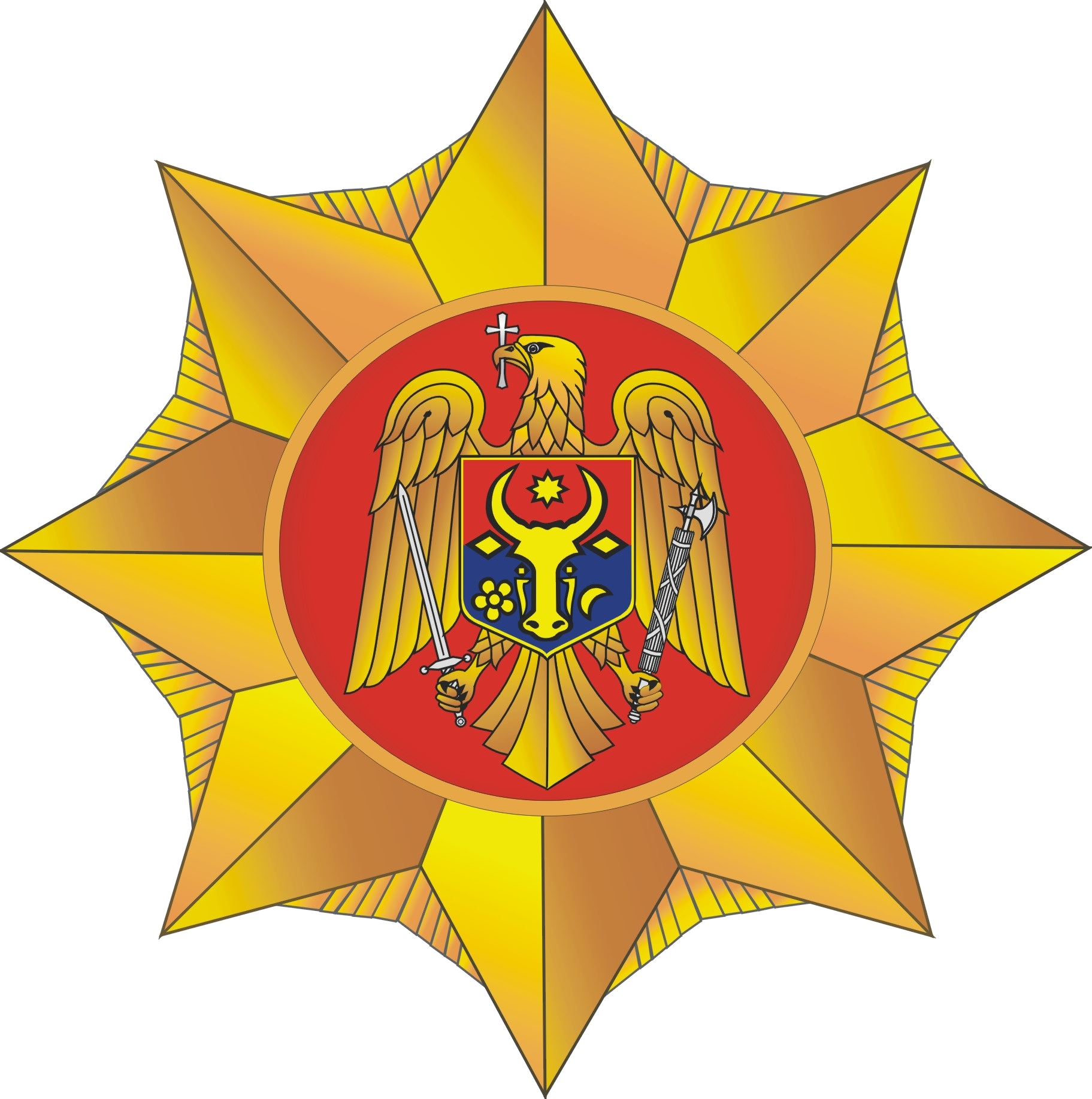
- Seal of the Ministry

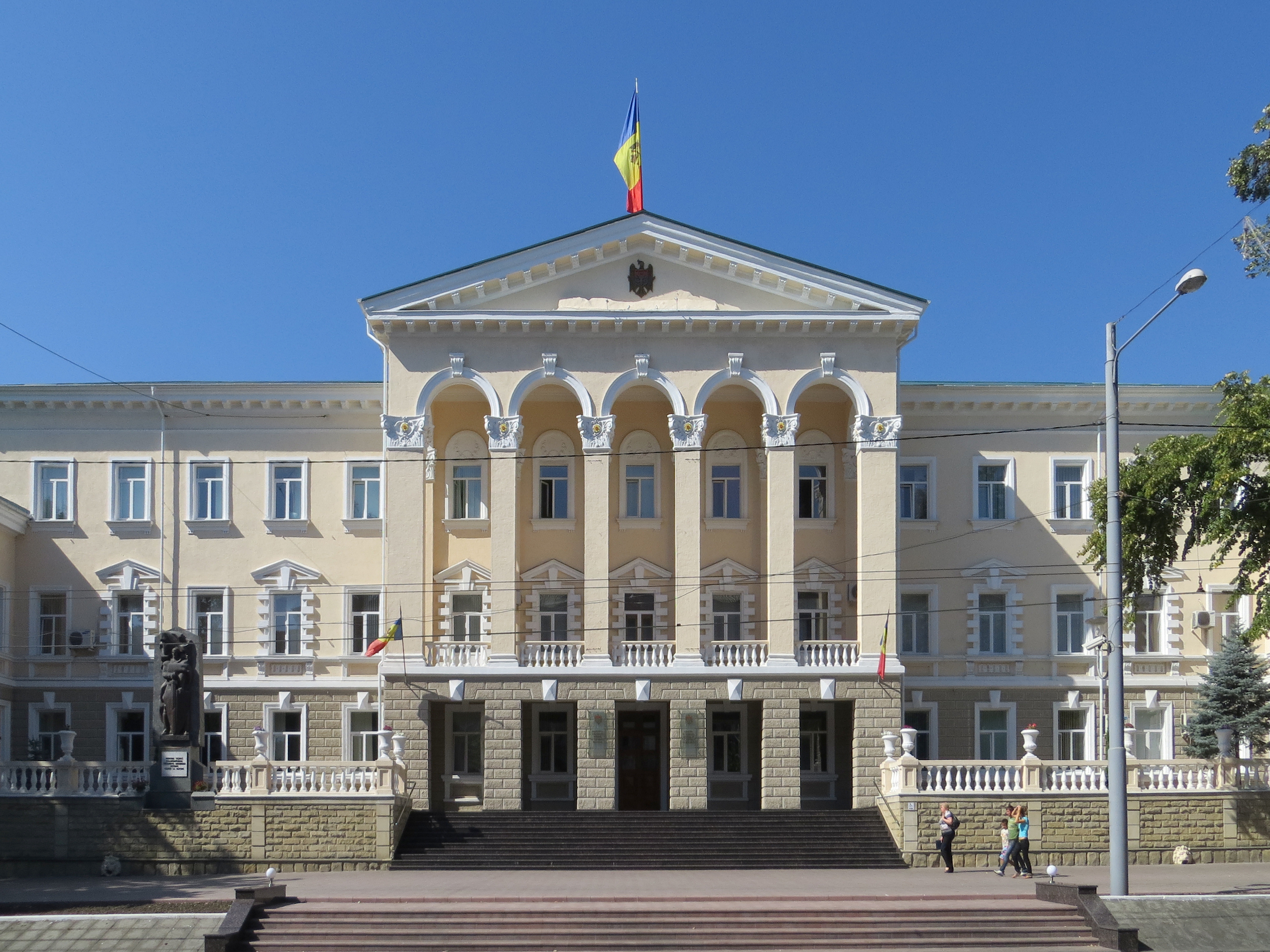
- Headquarters in Chișinău

Ministry overview
- Formed: 6 June 1990; 36 years ago
- Jurisdiction: Government of Moldova
- Headquarters: 75 Stephen the Great Boulevard, Chișinău
- Minister responsible: Daniella Misail-Nichitin, Minister of Internal Affairs
- Ministry executives: Valentin Cioclea, Secretary General; Andrei Cecoltan, Deputy Secretary General; Alexandru Bejan, Secretary of State; Victor Grosu, Secretary of State; Diana Salcuțan, Secretary of State
- Website: mai.gov.md

The Ministry of Internal Affairs (Romanian: Ministerul Afacerilor Interne, MAI) is one of the fourteen ministries of the Government of Moldova. It is the main executive body responsible for law enforcement agencies in Moldova such as Police, Border Police and Carabinieri.

== History ==
During the Moldavian Democratic Republic, Vladimir Cristi served as Director General for Internal Affairs.

The Ministry was created upon cessation by Soviet Union of Bessarabia which was part of Romania in 1940. On 8 August 1940 The Government of Soviet Union has announced creation of NKVD Internal affairs organization that was responsible public order and state secret service in newly created Moldavian Soviet Socialist Republic. After the World War II now with permanent soviet occupation local organization of NKVD on 26 March 1946 changes name to Ministry of Internal Affairs thus being direct inherit to current Ministry of Internal Affairs of Moldova. On 18 December 1990 the Parliament of newly Independent Moldovan Republic adopted law in relation to name of police (Poliţia) instead of Militsiya.

Among the departments of the Ministry are the General Division of State Guard, the Division of Information and Operative Evidence and the Department of Public order.

== Ministers ==
No.	Portrait	Name (Birth–Death)	Office term		Notes	Cabinet
1	Generalul Ion Costaș susținând un discurs pentru comemorarea eroilor căzuți în confruntările de pe Nistru (25100446319)	Ion Costaș (born 1944)	6 June 1990	5 February 1992		Druc Muravschi
2		Constantin Antoci (born 1949)	5 February 1992	24 January 1997		Muravschi Sangheli I-II
3		Mihail Plămădeală (born 1945)	24 January 1997	22 May 1998		Ciubuc I
4	VictorCatan8333	Victor Catan (born 1949)	22 May 1998	21 December 1999		Ciubuc II Sturza
5		Vladimir Țurcan (born 1954)	21 December 1999	19 April 2001		Braghiș
6		Vasile Drăgănel (born 1962)	19 April 2001	27 February 2002		Tarlev I
7		Gheorghe Papuc (born 1954)	27 February 2002	31 March 2008		Tarlev I-II
8		Valentin Mejinschi (born 1967)	31 March 2008	21 October 2008		Greceanîi I
9		Gheorghe Papuc (born 1954)	21 October 2008	25 September 2009		Greceanîi I-II
10	VictorCatan8333	Victor Catan (born 1949)	25 September 2009	14 January 2011		Filat I
11		Alexei Roibu (born 1954)	14 January 2011	24 July 2012		Filat II
12		Dorin Recean (born 1974)	24 July 2012	18 February 2015		Filat II Leancă
13		Oleg Balan (born 1969)	18 February 2015	20 January 2016		Gaburici Streleț
14		Alexandru Jizdan (born 1975)	20 January 2016	8 June 2019		Filip
15	Andrei Năstase in November 2017	Andrei Năstase (born 1975)	8 June 2019	14 November 2019	Deputy Prime Minister	Sandu
16	Voicu in August 2019	Pavel Voicu (born 1973)	14 November 2019	6 August 2021		Chicu
17		Ana Revenco (born 1977)	6 August 2021	14 July 2023		Gavrilița Recean
18		Adrian Efros (born 1982)	17 July 2023	19 November 2024		Recean
19		Daniella Misail-Nichitin (born 1976)	19 November 2024	Incumbent		Recean Munteanu Tofan

== Structure ==
The ministry has the following organizational structure:

- Cabinet of the Minister
- Directorate of Policy Analysis, Monitoring and Evaluation
- Directorate of Policies in the Field of Public Order and Security
- Directorate for Crime Prevention and Fight
- Directorate for International Cooperation
- Directorate of Policies in Integrated State Border Management Field
- Directorate of Policies in Migration and Asylum
- Directorate of Policies in Crisis Management and Emergency Situations field
- Directorate of Staff Policies and Education
- Policy Service in the field of population and citizenship evidence
- Policy Service in the field of state material reserves
- Special Issues Service
- Internal Audit Service
- Directorate of Institutional Management
- Juridical department
- Human Resources Department
- Financial-Administrative Department
- Department of Document Management
- Information and communication service with the media

=== Subordinate institutions ===
- General Inspectorate of Police
- Moldovan Border Police
- General Inspectorate for Emergency Situations
- General Inspectorate of Carabinieri
- The Migration and Asylum Bureau
- Information Technology Service
- Internal Protection and Anti-Corruption Service
- Operational Leading and Inspection Service
- Ștefan cel Mare Police Academy
- Medical Service
- Central Sports Club "Dinamo"
- Material Reserves Agency
