= Andrei Stratan =

Moldovan politician

President of the Republican Party
- Incumbent
- Assumed office 1 August 2010
- Preceded by: Ion Curtean

Deputy Prime Minister of Moldova
- In office 19 April 2005 – 25 September 2009 Serving with Dmitri Todoroglo
- President: Vladimir Voronin; Mihai Ghimpu (acting)
- Prime Minister: Vasile Tarlev; Zinaida Greceanîi; Vitalie Pîrlog (acting)
- Preceded by: Ștefan Odagiu
- Succeeded by: Iurie Leancă

Minister of Foreign Affairs
- In office 4 February 2004 – 25 September 2009
- President: Vladimir Voronin; Mihai Ghimpu (acting)
- Prime Minister: Vasile Tarlev; Zinaida Greceanîi; Vitalie Pîrlog (acting)
- Preceded by: Nicolae Dudău
- Succeeded by: Iurie Leancă (as Minister of Foreign Affairs and European Integration)

First Deputy Minister of Foreign Affairs
- In office 11 June 2003 – 4 February 2004
- President: Vladimir Voronin
- Prime Minister: Vasile Tarlev
- Minister: Nicolae Dudău

Personal details
- Born: September 3, 1966 (age 59) Chișinău, Moldavian SSR, Soviet Union
- Party: Republican Party of Moldova

Andrei Stratan (born 3 September 1966) is a Moldovan politician.

He was the Deputy Prime Minister and Minister of Foreign Affairs and European Integration in the Vasile Tarlev Cabinet and the Zinaida Greceanîi Cabinets.
