= Puțintei =

Puţintei
- Commune
- Interactive map of Puţintei
- Country: Moldova
- District: Orhei District

Population (2014)
  - Total: 2,173
- Time zone: UTC+2 (EET)
  - Summer (DST): UTC+3 (EEST)

Puțintei is a commune in Orhei District of Moldova. It is composed of three villages: Dișcova, Puțintei and Vîprova.
