= Vitalie Pîrlog =

Moldovan politician (born 1974)

Acting Prime Minister of Moldova
- In office 14 September 2009 – 25 September 2009
- President: Mihai Ghimpu (acting)
- Preceded by: Zinaida Greceanîi
- Succeeded by: Vlad Filat

Chairperson of the Commission for the Control of INTERPOL's Files
- In office 11 March 2017 – 11 March 2022

Director of the Security and Intelligence Service
- In office 21 December 2017 – 21 February 2018
- Preceded by: Mihai Bălan
- Succeeded by: Vasile Botnari

Minister of Justice
- In office 20 September 2006 – 25 September 2009
- President: Vladimir Voronin; Mihai Ghimpu (acting)
- Prime Minister: Vasile Tarlev; Zinaida Greceanîi
- Preceded by: Victoria Iftodi
- Succeeded by: Alexandru Tănase

Personal details
- Born: 28 July 1974 (age 52) Nisporeni, Moldavian SSR, Soviet Union (now Moldova)
- Profession: Jurist

Vitalie Pîrlog (Romanian: [pɨrˈloɡ]; born 28 July 1974) is a Moldovan politician.

Pîrlog was captured in the UAE on 20 June 2025 after a warrant from Interpol issued by France for bribery, forgery, and scam.

== Education and early career ==
Between 1992 and 1997, he studied at the Free International University of Moldova (Chișinău) (Law Department), receiving a Degree in International Law. Pîrlog began his career in 1993 as Legal Adviser within an international private company. From 1997 till 2001, he served as Senior Adviser in the Document Services of the Office of the President of Moldova. In January 2001 he was appointed Deputy Director of the Governmental Agent and International Relations Department of the Ministry of Justice. Since 2001 Vitalie Pîrlog has represented the Government of Moldova before the European Court of Human Rights, cumulating at the same time the position of Director of International Relations and European Integration Department of the Ministry of Justice.

In the period 2001-2005, he was a member (as national expert) of the Steering Committee for Human Rights (CDDH) of the Council of Europe, the European Commission for Justice Effectiveness of the Council of Europe, the Committee of Experts for the Improvement of the Procedures for the Protection of Human Rights (one of the two expert-committees subordinate to the CDDH). Pîrlog was also Head of the Moldavian Delegation at the European Committee on Crime Problems of the Council of Europe.

After 2005 he worked within the Permanent Governmental Commission on the enforcement of the European Court of Human Rights final decisions against the Republic of Moldova.

On 20 September 2006, Pîrlog became Justice Minister in the Vasile Tarlev cabinet. He kept this post during the Zinaida Greceanîi Cabinets.

== Prime Minister of Moldova ==
Zinaida Greceanîi resigned on September 9, 2009, saying she was unable to simultaneously hold the posts of prime minister and member of the Moldovan Parliament at the same time. On September 10, 2009, Moldova’s President Vladimir Voronin signed a decree appointing the departing Justice Minister Vitalie Pîrlog as acting prime minister from September 14 until a new government is formed by Alliance for European Integration. Vitalie Pîrlog acted as Prime Minister until the members of the new government took an oath; the president of Moldova nominated Vlad Filat as the new prime minister.

== Interpol ==
At the 85th General Assembly of INTERPOL held in Bali, Indonesia, on November 7–10, 2016 was elected by a majority of votes as Member of the Commission for the Control of INTERPOL's Files (CCF) for a term of office for five years. On 11 March 2017, Vitalie Pîrlog was elected Chairperson of the Commission for the Control of INTERPOL's Files.

In the period 2009-2017 he was President of NGO Alliance for justice and human rights. In 2013 he obtained the title of Ph.D. in Law with the thesis entitled "The Compatibility of the European Convention on Human Rights with the Constitution of the Republic of Moldova in the field of freedom of expression". Between 21 December 2017 - 21 February 2018 he served as Director of the Security and Intelligence Service of the Republic of Moldova, being appointed by the Parliament. He is fluent in Romanian, French and Russian.

== Notes ==
Political offices
Preceded by Zinaida Greceanîi	Prime Minister of Moldova; Acting; 2009	Succeeded by Vlad Filat
