= Party of Communists of the Republic of Moldova =

Political party in Moldova

Party of Communists of the Republic of Moldova Partidul Comuniștilor din Republica Moldova
- Abbreviation: PCRM
- President: Diana Caraman
- Executive Secretaries: Constantin Starîș; Vladimir Telnov
- Honorary President: Vladimir Voronin
- Parliamentary group leader: Diana Caraman
- Founder: Vladimir Voronin
- Founded: 22 October 1993; 33 years ago
- Registered: 1994
- Preceded by: Communist Party of Moldavia (claimed, not legally)
- Headquarters: 11 Nicolae Iorga Street, Chişinău
- Newspaper: Comunistul
- Youth wing: Communist Union of Youth of Moldova
- Membership (2018): 11,700
- Ideology: Communism; Marxism–Leninism; Left-conservatism; Moldovenism; Russophilia; Soviet patriotism; Euroscepticism
- Political position: Far-left
- National affiliation: Bloc of Communists and Socialists (2021–2025); Patriotic Electoral Bloc (August–October 2025)
- European affiliation: Party of the European Left (associated member)
- International affiliation: IMCWP
- Continental affiliation: UCP–CPSU
- Colours: Red
- Slogan: Republică! Puterea poporului! Socialism! ('Republic! Power to the People! Socialism!')
- Parliament: 8 / 101 (8%)
- District Presidents: 0 / 32 (0%)
- Mayors: 7 / 898 (0.8%)

Party flag

Website
- www.pcrm.md

The Party of Communists of the Republic of Moldova (Romanian: Partidul Comuniștilor din Republica Moldova, PCRM) is a Marxist-Leninist party in Moldova founded by Vladimir Voronin and currently led by Diana Caraman. It is the only communist party to have held a majority government in a post-Soviet state. (Note: The Communist Party of the Russian Federation (CPRF) won two parliamentary elections in the 1990s by receiving a plurality (but notably not a majority) of seats in the Duma; however, since Russia is a presidential republic and Boris Yeltsin was its president at the time, the CPRF was unable to form a government. The Communist Party of South Ossetia, which was de facto independent at the time, won a majority of seats in the 1994 election.) It has been variously described as communist, Moldovenist, populist, Russophile, and pro-Soviet.

Affiliated with the Union of Communist Parties – Communist Party of the Soviet Union, it is also a member of the Party of the European Left and the International Meeting of Communist and Workers' Parties.

In contrast to most like-minded left-wing and communist parties, especially in the Western world, the party has a conservative outlook on social issues, reflecting Voronin's views, the country's strong social conservatism, and the influence of the Moldovan Orthodox Church.

== History ==
The PCRM was registered as a political party in 1994. The PCRM was part of the Popular Patriotic Forces Front at the time of the 1996 presidential election, in which Voronin stood as the coalition's candidate and won 10.3% of the vote, placing third. The party supported Petru Lucinschi in the second round of the election, and following Lucinschi's victory the PCRM was given two positions in the government. Romanian historian Dorin Cimpoeșu has described the party as Moldovenist.

=== 1998 parliamentary election ===
In the 1998 Moldovan parliamentary election, the PCRM won 30.1% of the vote and 40 seats, becoming the largest party in parliament; in its platform, it called for "the rebirth of a socialist society". Despite its strong showing, the PCRM was left in opposition due to the formation of a center-right coalition government, Alliance for Democracy and Reforms (ADR). Although Lucinschi later nominated Vladimir Voronin as Prime Minister of Moldova in late 1999, the nomination was unsuccessful because Voronin did not have enough support in parliament.

=== 2001 parliamentary election ===
The PCRM received 49.9% of the vote in the 2001 Moldovan parliamentary election, winning 71 out of the 101 seats in parliament. With a PCRM parliamentary majority, Voronin was elected as president by parliament in April 2001. The Constitutional Court ruled that the President could also lead a political party, and Voronin was re-elected as party leader.

=== 2005 parliamentary election ===
As the ruling political party in Moldova, it won the 2005 Moldovan parliamentary election, and provided the President, Vladimir Voronin, the Prime Minister, Zinaida Greceanîi, and the President of the Moldovan Parliament, Marian Lupu. Under Voronin, it privatized several state-owned industries and governed in a multi-party fashion. It also favors European integration and eventual EU membership.

=== 2009 parliamentary elections ===
After April 2009 Moldovan parliamentary election and the 2009 Moldova civil unrest, the political and civic climate in Moldova became very polarized. The parliament failed to elect a new president. For this reason, the parliament was dissolved and, consequently, snap elections were held. At the July 2009 Moldovan parliamentary election, the party received 44.7% of the vote. That gave the former ruling party 48 MPs and the remaining 53 seats in the 101-member chamber went to four opposition parties which subsequently formed the governing Alliance for European Integration (AIE). For the first time since 2001, the Communists were pushed in opposition.

=== 2010 parliamentary election ===
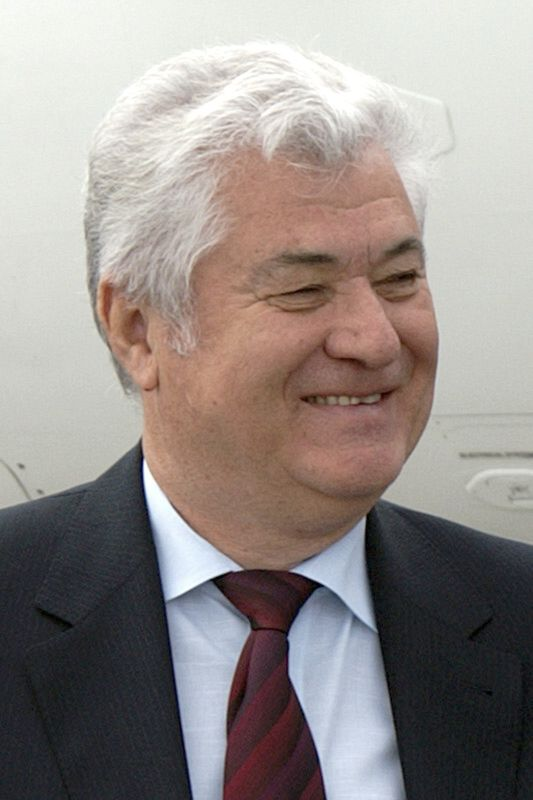
Vladimir Voronin was President of Moldova and the party's most prominent personality.

After the Parliament failed to elect a new President of the Republic, 2010 Moldovan parliamentary election were called. In the election, PCRM obtained 39.34% of votes, winning 42 seats, going again into opposition to the Alliance of European Integration (AIE). In 2011, Igor Dodon and Zinaida Greceanîi left the party and joined the Party of Socialists of the Republic of Moldova (PSRM).

=== 2014 parliamentary election ===
The 2014 Moldovan parliamentary election saw a great defeat for PCRM, which received only 17.48% of votes, losing more than half of its electors to PSRM and electing 21 seats. Following the elections, the party agreed to give confidence and supply to the new Gaburici Cabinet. The agreement collapsed in June 2015 and the PCRM went back into opposition.

In 2016, the party suffered a large split as 14 MPS left PCRM faction and established the Social Democratic Platform for Moldova, joining the majority of Filip Cabinet. On 10 March 2017, all 14 MPs joined the Democratic Party of Moldova (PDM). Since then, the party rapidly declined in polls, losing most of its votes to PSRM and PDM.

=== 2019 parliamentary election ===
At the 2019 Moldovan parliamentary election, the PCRM collapsed, receiving only 3.75% of votes and losing all representation in the parliament for the first time in independent Moldova.

=== 2021 parliamentary election ===
At the 2021 parliamentary election, the PCRM decided to join forces with the PSRM in order to re-enter the parliament as the Electoral Bloc of Communists and Socialists (BECS). The party won 10 out of 101 seats in the parliament as part of the aforementioned electoral bloc, thus regaining parliamentary presence after 2019.

=== 2025 parliamentary election ===
In the run up to the 2025 parliamentary election, the PCRM joined the Patriotic Electoral Bloc, composed of the Party of Socialists (PSRM), the Heart of Moldova Republican Party (PRIM), and the Future of Moldova Party (PVM) led by former communist prime minister Vasile Tarlev. Shortly after the elections, in which the bloc won 26 seats, of which 8 were taken by the PCRM, the party announced it would be leaving the bloc and forming its own parliamentary group.

== Ideology ==
According to Art. 1 of its statute adopted in 2008, the PCRM is the "lawful successor and heir of the Communist Party of Moldova both in terms of ideas and traditions." While officially espousing a Marxist-Leninist communist doctrine, there is debate over their policies. In 2009, The Economist considered it a centre-right party, communist-in-name only. Romanian political scientist Vladimir Tismăneanu posits that the party is not communist in the classical sense because of the many changes since the dissolution of the Soviet Union, but it is the clear successor to the Communist Party of Moldova, and not something foreign to it, for its Soviet nostalgia.

For its latest period of governance, the PCRM has outlined a new quality of life, economic modernisation, European integration, and consolidation of the society as goals for the country. During the party's time in government, the party has adopted pro-Russian policies, while remaining committed to European integration. Despite being known for gaining most of its support from pensioners, since 2009 it also started to attract more votes from young people and adopting a populist outlook, which was downplayed during the PCRM's time in government but has resurfaced at the opposition and extra-parliamentary level. In contrast to social populist parties, some of which combine left-wing policies on welfare with nationalist stances, while its main ideology continues to be Marxism–Leninism and European socialism.

The party is the ideological successor of the Unity Movement for Equality in Rights. It is known for its Moldovenist position, supporting the existence of Moldovan language and ethnicity. The party considers 28 June 1940 as "the day Moldova was liberated by the Soviet Union from the Romanian occupation". For these reasons, part of the press (such as journalist Oleg Serebrian) described the party as anti-Romanian.

== Moldovan Komsomol ==
The Communist Youth Union of Moldova (Romanian: Uniunea Tineretului Comunist din Moldova; Russian: Коммунистический союз молодёжи Молдовы) was registered in 1995, currently including 6,000 members. According to the Ministry of Justice of the Republic of Moldova, it is the largest youth organization in the country. The First Secretaries of the Central Committee of the UTCM were the following: Victor Verșîn (1995–1997), Eduard Babliuc (1997–2000), Tatiana Nicoară (2000–2004), Grigore Petrenco (2004–2007), Inna Șupac (2007–present).

== Leadership ==
- President – Diana Caraman
- Executive Secretaries – Constantin Starîș and Vladimir Telnov
- Honorary President – Vladimir Voronin

== Electoral results ==
=== Parliament ===
Parliament of the Republic of Moldova
Election	Leader	Performance					Rank	Government
Election	Leader	Votes	%	± pp	Seats	+/–	Rank	Government
1998	Vladimir Voronin	487,002	30.01%	New	40 / 101	New	1st	Opposition (ADR: CDM–PDMP–PFD)
1998	Vladimir Voronin	487,002	30.01%	New	40 / 101	New	1st	Opposition (ADR: CDM–PDMP–PFD)
1998	Vladimir Voronin	487,002	30.01%	New	40 / 101	New	1st	Support (independents→BeAB)
2001	Vladimir Voronin	794,808	50.07%	▲20.06	71 / 101	▲31	1st	Supermajority (PCRM)
2005	Vladimir Voronin	716,336	45.98%	▼4.09	56 / 101	▼15	1st	Majority (PCRM)
2005	Vladimir Voronin	716,336	45.98%	▼4.09	56 / 101	▼15	1st	Majority (PCRM)
2009 (April)	Vladimir Voronin	760,551	49.48%	▲3.50	60 / 101	▲4	1st	Supermajority (PCRM)
2009 (July)	Vladimir Voronin	706,732	44.69%	▼4.79	48 / 101	▼12	1st	Opposition (AIE: PLDM–PDM–PL–AMN)
2010	Vladimir Voronin	677,069	39.34%	▼5.35	42 / 101	▼6	1st	Opposition (AIE: PLDM–PDM–PL)
2010	Vladimir Voronin	677,069	39.34%	▼5.35	42 / 101	▼6	1st	Opposition (CPE: PLDM–PDM–PLR)
2014	Vladimir Voronin	279,366	17.48%	▼21.86	21 / 101	▼17	▼3rd	Opposition (APME: PLDM–PDM)
2014	Vladimir Voronin	279,366	17.48%	▼21.86	21 / 101	▼17	▼3rd	Opposition (AIE III: PLDM–PDM–PL)
2014	Vladimir Voronin	279,366	17.48%	▼21.86	21 / 101	▼17	▼3rd	Opposition (PDM–PPEM–PL)
2019	Vladimir Voronin	53,175	3.75%	▼13.73	0 / 101	▼21	▼5th	Extra-parliamentary (ACUM: (PAS–PPDA)–PSRM)
2019	Vladimir Voronin	53,175	3.75%	▼13.73	0 / 101	▼21	▼5th	Extra-parliamentary (PSRM–PDM)
2021	Vladimir Voronin	398,675	27.17% (BECS)	▲23.42	10 / 101	▲10	▲3rd	Opposition (PAS majority government)
2025	Vladimir Voronin	381,505	24.17% (BEP)	▼3.00	8 / 101	▼2	3rd	Opposition (PAS majority government)

=== Presidency ===
President of Moldova
Election	Candidate	First round		Second round		Result
Election	Candidate	Votes	%	Votes	%	Result
2001	Vladimir Voronin	71 (Note: The president was elected by 101 members of the Parliament of the Republic of Moldova; 61 votes were needed to win.)	70.30%			Elected ✓
2005	Vladimir Voronin	75	74.26%			Elected ✓
2009 (May–June)	Zinaida Greceanîi	60	59.41%			No winner
2009 (November–December)	Boycotted the elections					No winner
2011–2012	Boycotted the elections					Lost ✗
2016	Boycotted the elections					Lost ✗
2020	Boycotted the elections					Lost ✗
2024	Vasile Tarlev	3.19	3.19%	Endorsed Alexandr Stoianoglo		Lost ✗

== Gallery ==
Votes won by PCRM in the April 2009 Moldovan parliamentary election by raion and municipality
