= Vasile Tarlev =

Prime Minister of Moldova from 2001 to 2008

Vasile Tarlev MP OR
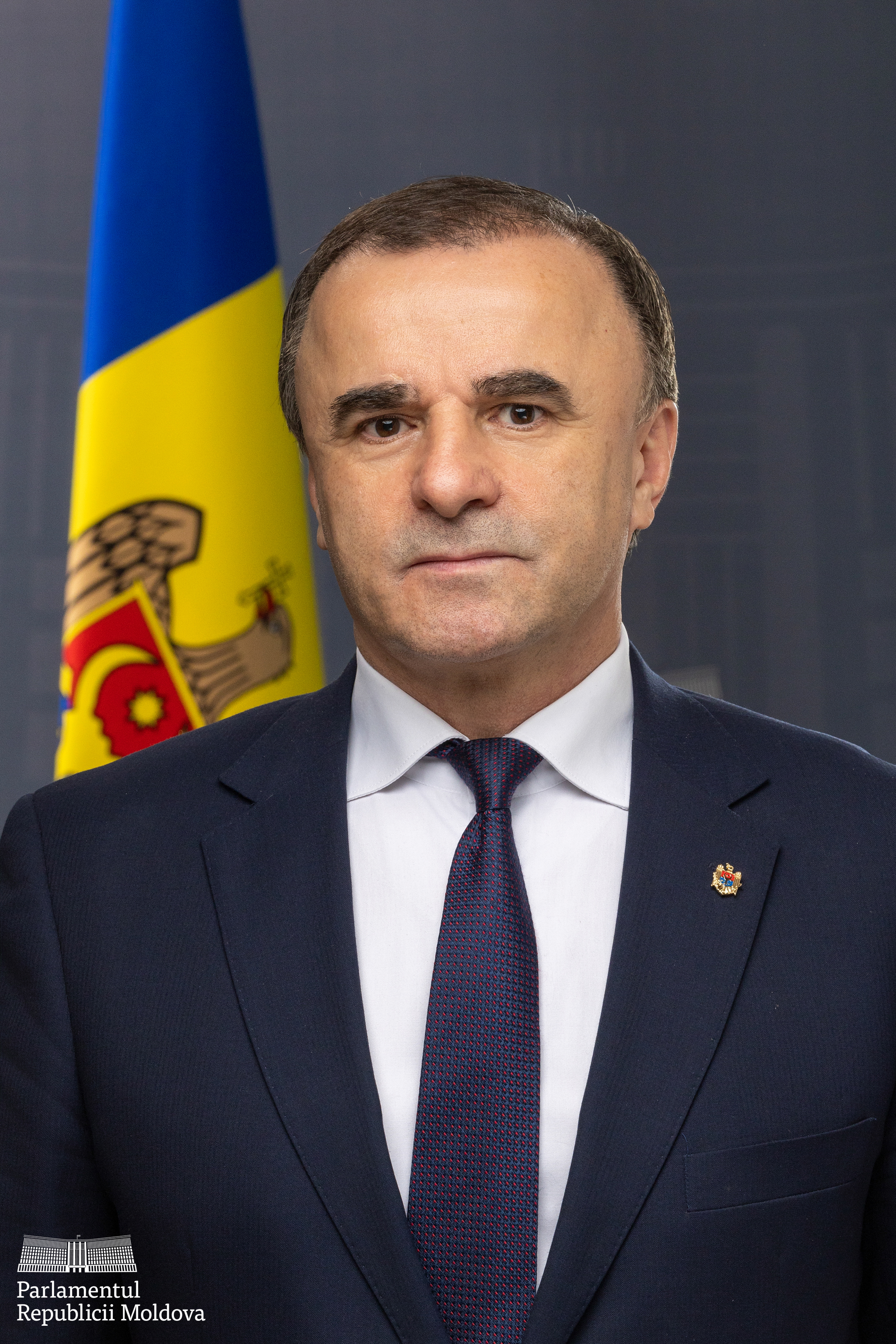
- Official portrait, 2025

Member of the Moldovan Parliament
- Incumbent
- Assumed office 22 October 2025
- In office 6 March 2005 – 19 April 2005
- Succeeded by: Anatolie Zagorodnîi
- Parliamentary group: Party of Communists

President of the Future of Moldova Party
- Incumbent
- Assumed office 9 February 2024
- Preceded by: Valeriu Ianioglo (as President of Our Budjak Party)

6th Prime Minister of Moldova
- In office 19 April 2001 – 31 March 2008
- President: Vladimir Voronin
- Deputy: See list: Vasile Iovv Dmitri Todoroglo Valerian Cristea Andrei Cucu Ștefan Odagiu Andrei Stratan Zinaida Greceanîi Vitalie Vrabie Victor Stepaniuc
- Preceded by: Dumitru Braghiș
- Succeeded by: Zinaida Greceanîi

Personal details
- Born: 6 October 1963 (age 62) Bașcalia, Moldavian SSR, Soviet Union
- Citizenship: USSR (1963–1991); Bulgaria (1963–2024); Moldova (since 1991)
- Party: PVM (since 2024)
- Other political affiliations: PCRM (2005–2008); UCM (2008–2009); Revival (2012–2016)
- Children: 2
- Education: Technical University of Moldova
- Awards: Order of Labour (1997); Order of the Republic (2008)

Vasile Tarlev (born 6 October 1963) is a Moldovan politician who served as the 6th Prime Minister of Moldova from 2001 to 2008.

== Background and earlier life ==
He studied engineering at the Technical University of Moldova and became a member of assorted economic councils. After 2001 Moldovan parliamentary election, He was appointed prime minister on April 19, 2001. This is the first time since 1990 that the Communists won a parliamentary election.

Tarlev is ethnically a Bessarabian Bulgarian and was born in Bașcalia, Basarabeasca District.

== Prime Minister of Moldova ==
Tarlev served as Prime Minister of Moldova from 2001 until 2008, until 2017 he was the only prime minister to win two consecutive terms.

He resigned on March 19, 2008 in an unexpected move, saying that he wanted to make way for "new people." Parliament approved his resignation on March 20, and President Vladimir Voronin proposed Zinaida Greceanîi as his successor; she was approved by Moldovan Parliament on 31 March 2008.

== 2024 presidential campaign ==
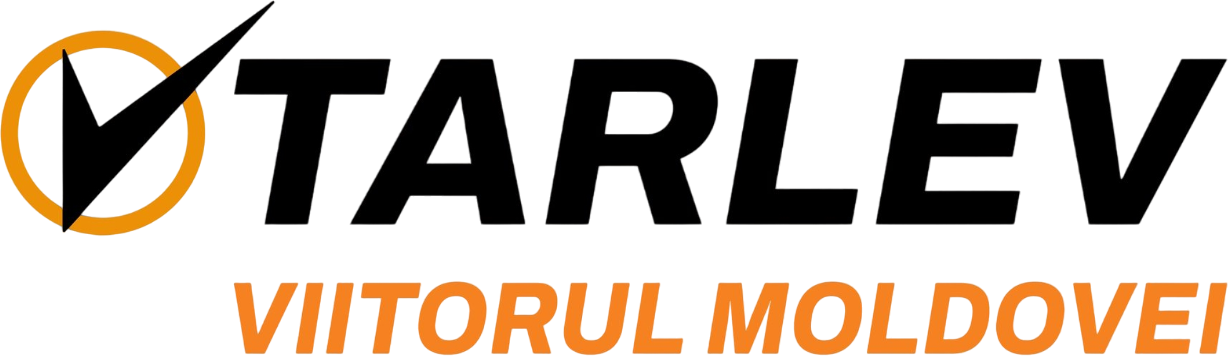
Tarlev's logo for his 2024 presidential campaign

On September 21, 2024, Tarlev announced that he would be running for President for the Future of Moldova party with the slogan "development, welfare, peace."

He stated that his candidacy's program is based on ten objectives, including growing and strengthening the economy, supporting young families, improving the health and education system. The center of his campaign is increasing jobs, calling for mass industrialization as well as modernization of Moldova's farms.

Tarlev has called for normalization of relations with Russia to create a "balanced foreign policy" which he claims will increase jobs and reduce natural gas prices. He also stated that not pursuing a "neutral" foreign policy would bring war to Moldova, and that he is against joining a military bloc like NATO.

Tarlev stated that if he is elected President he would work to remodel the office so that it was like the United States. He also called to reform the country's judiciary, saying that “I swear, the Constitution will always guide me, as will the Bible” and that he would work to make the judiciary more independent from the governing party.

Tarlev was endorsed by former Governor of Gagauzia Valeri Ianioglo and Constitutional Court president Dumitru Pulbere.

Tarlev would lose in the first round, earning 49,317 votes or 3.19% of the electorate, placing in sixth.

== See also ==
- Politics of Moldova
- First Tarlev Cabinet
- Second Tarlev Cabinet

Political offices
Preceded by Dumitru Braghiş	Prime Minister of Moldova; 2001—2008	Succeeded by Zinaida Greceanîi
