= Vladimir Voronin =

Moldovan politician (born 1941)

Vladimir Voronin MP
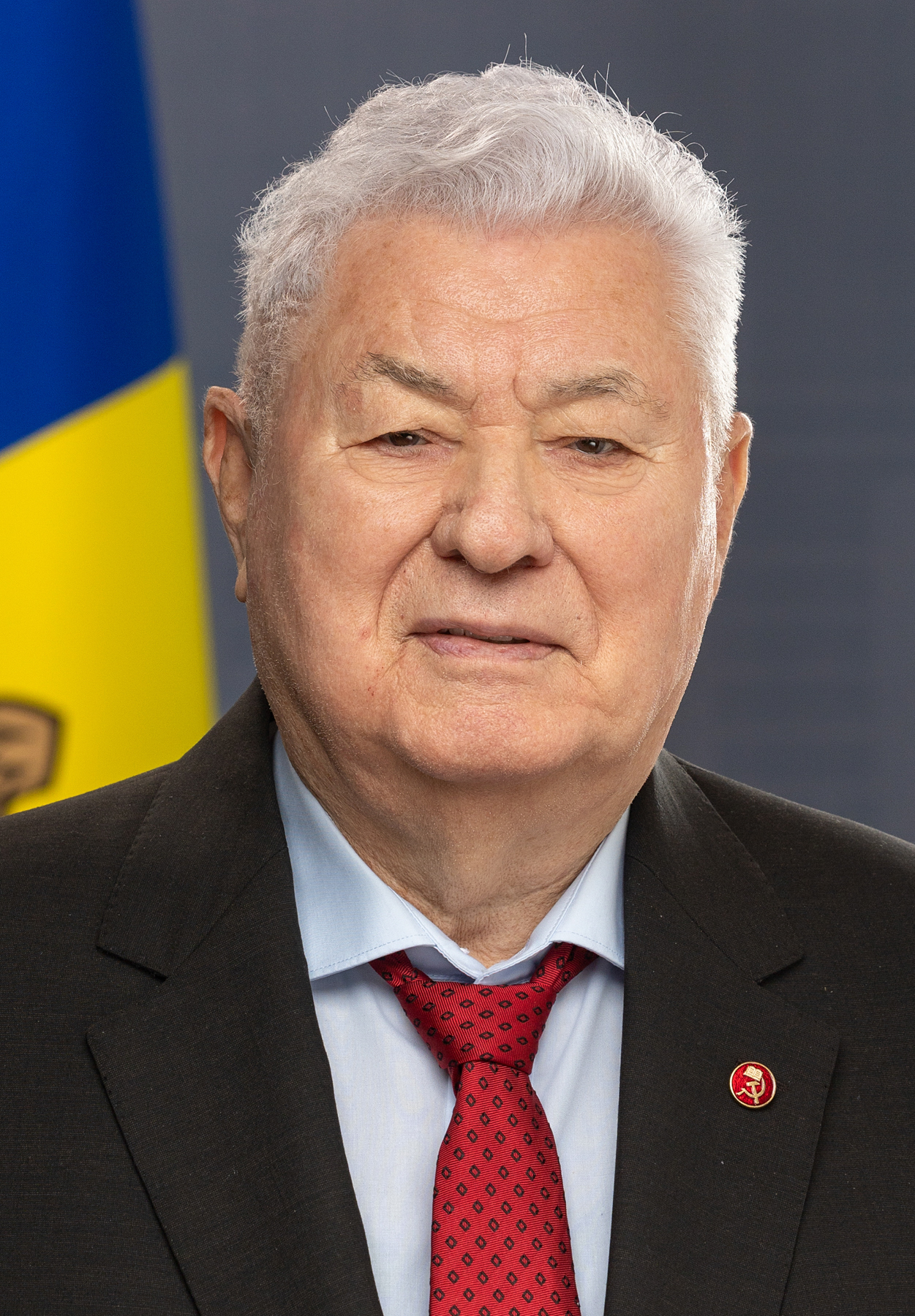
- Official portrait, 2025

Member of the Moldovan Parliament
- Incumbent
- Assumed office 23 July 2021
- Parliamentary group: Bloc of Communists and Socialists; Party of Communists
- In office 22 April 2009 – 9 March 2019
- Parliamentary group: Party of Communists
- In office 17 March 2005 – 8 April 2005
- Succeeded by: Alexandru Jdanov
- Parliamentary group: Party of Communists
- In office 9 April 1998 – 18 April 2001
- Succeeded by: Valeriu Burca
- Parliamentary group: Party of Communists

President of the Party of Communists
- In office 24 December 1994 – 6 June 2026
- Succeeded by: Diana Caraman

3rd President of Moldova
- In office 7 April 2001 – 11 September 2009
- Prime Minister: Dumitru Braghiș; Vasile Tarlev; Zinaida Greceanîi
- Preceded by: Petru Lucinschi
- Succeeded by: Mihai Ghimpu (acting)

7th President of the Moldovan Parliament
- In office 12 May 2009 – 14 August 2009
- President: Himself
- Prime Minister: Zinaida Greceanîi
- Deputy: Vladimir Țurcan; Grigore Petrenco
- Preceded by: Marian Lupu
- Succeeded by: Mihai Ghimpu

Minister of Internal Affairs of the Moldavian SSR
- In office 17 February 1989 – 24 May 1990
- Premier: Ivan Calin; Petru Pascari
- Preceded by: Gheorghe Lavranciuc
- Succeeded by: Ion Costaș (as Minister of Internal Affairs of SSR Moldova)

Personal details
- Born: Vladimir Bujeniță; 25 May 1941 (age 85) Corjova, Moldavian SSR, Soviet Union (now Moldova)
- Citizenship: Moldova; Russia
- Party: Communist Party of Moldova (before 1991); Party of Communists of the Republic of Moldova (1993–present)
- Spouse: Taisia Mihailovna
- Children: 2, including Oleg
- Education: Cooperation College; All-Union Institute for Food Industry; Academy of Social Sciences; Soviet Academy of the Ministry of Internal Affairs

Military service
- Allegiance: Soviet Union
- Branch/service: (Soviet Union) Soviet Police
- Years of service: 1989–1990
- Rank: Major general

Vladimir Voronin (Romanian: [vladiˈmir voˈronin]; born Vladimir Bujeniță, 25 May 1941) is a Moldovan politician. He was the third President of Moldova from 2001 until 2009 and served as the leader of the Party of Communists of Moldova (PCRM) from 1994 until 2026. He was Europe's first democratically elected communist party head of state after the dissolution of the Eastern Bloc.

== Family and education ==
Vladimir Voronin was born Vladimir Bujeniță in the village of Corjova, located at that time in the newly-established Moldavian SSR. Although Voronin is a lifelong communist who pursued unfriendly policies towards Romania at various times during the 2000s, his grandfather Isidor Sârbu was the mayor of Corjova during the Romanian rule in Transnistria and an anti-communist fighter in Romania after 1944. Voronin's mother, Pelagheia Bujeniță, died on 2 July 2005. His biological father, Nicolae Bujeniță, died during World War II. Voronin was raised by his step-father, Nikolai Voronin, an ethnic Russian and a communist activist.

Voronin graduated from the Cooperation Tekhnikum (Kooperativny tekhnikum) of Chișinău (1961), the All-Union Institute for Food Industry (1971), the Academy of Social Sciences of the Central Committee of the Communist Party of the Soviet Union (1983), and the Academy of the Ministry of Internal Affairs of the Soviet Union (1991). Voronin's CV states he is an economist, engineer, political science graduate, and jurist by education.

== Early career ==
He began working in 1961 as the head of a bakery in the town of Criuleni. From 1966 until 1971, Voronin held the offices of vice-director of the bread factory in Criuleni and head of the bread factory in Dubăsari.

After 1971, he was active in the state administration of the Moldavian SSR, being in turn a member of the Dubăsari and Ungheni township executive committees, of the Ungheni District Executive Committee, and, starting 1983, inspector and vice-director of the Organization Section of the Central Committee of the Moldavian branch of the Communist Party of the Soviet Union. In 1985, he was appointed head of section in the Council of Ministers of the Moldavian SSR. Between 1985 and 1989, Voronin served as first secretary of the Bender City Committee of the Communist Party. Between 1988 and 1990, he held the office of the Minister of Internal Affairs of the Moldovan SSR. In this capacity he advocated against the use of force to quell anti-Soviet popular demonstrations on 7 and 10 November 1989, a regretful reference to which he made when addressing the country on TV on 8 April 2009 after anti-government protests were quelled by the police. Voronin was also a member of the Supreme Soviet of the Moldavian SSR of 10th and 11th legislatures.

In 1993, Voronin became the co-president of the Organizational Committee for the creation of the Party of Communists of the Republic of Moldova (PCRM). He played a central role in reviving the Communist Party after it was banned in 1991–1993. In 1994 he was elected President of the PCRM. He was a candidate for the post of President of the now-independent Republic of Moldova at the 1996 elections. In the parliamentary election in March 1998, Vladimir Voronin was elected as a Member of Parliament. He then served as member of its Permanent Bureau and as president of the PCRM's parliamentary faction, which held 40 of 101 seats.

Voronin was nominated as Prime Minister of Moldova by President Petru Lucinschi in late 1999, but the nomination was unsuccessful because Voronin did not have enough support in parliament. In the parliamentary election in February 2001, he was again elected as a Member of Parliament.

- Presidency of Vladimir Voronin; 7 April 2001 – 11 September 2009
- President: Vladimir Voronin
- Prime Minister: Dumitru Braghiș Vasile Tarlev Zinaida Greceanîi
- Cabinet: Braghiș Cabinet First Tarlev Cabinet Second Tarlev Cabinet First Greceanîi Cabinet Second Greceanîi Cabinet
- Party: Party of Communists
- Election: 2001; 2005
- Seat: Presidential Palace 164 Stephen the Great Boulevard, Chișinău

== Presidential career ==
=== First mandate ===
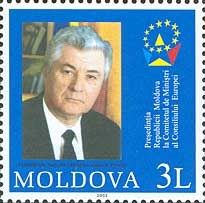
Voronin at the Committee of Ministers of the Council of Europe in 2003

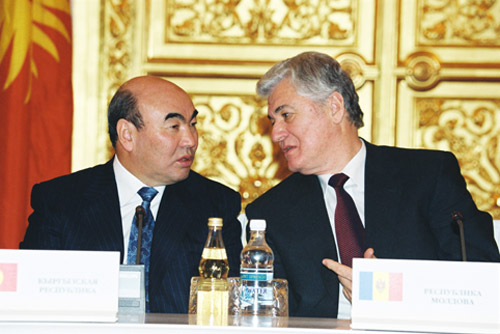
Voronin with Kyrgyz president Askar Akayev in Moscow in 2001

The PCRM won 50.07% of the vote and 71 of the 101 seats in the February 2001 parliamentary election; by this time the constitution had been changed to provide for election of the President through the Parliament rather than popular vote. In March the PCRM's Central Committee nominated Voronin as its presidential candidate at a plenum, and on 4 April 2001 Voronin was elected as president by the Parliament. Of the 89 deputies participating in the vote, 71 voted for Voronin, 15 voted for Dumitru Braghiş, and three voted for Valerian Cristea. He was sworn in at a ceremony in Chișinău on 7 April 2001. The Constitutional Court ruled that the president could also lead a political party, and Voronin was re-elected as the PCRM's leader.

Voronin maintained his commitment to the reduction of Moldova's chronic poverty by allocating more resources to social safety net items such as health, education, and increasing pensions and salaries. These measures helped to maintain support for his government, but Moldova still remained the poorest country in Europe throughout his presidency, with around 38% of GDP coming from remittances of Moldovans working abroad (2008). Voronin's tenure as president was marked by fluctuating relations with the International Monetary Fund (IMF) and the World Bank.

From January to April 2002, opposition forces organized large demonstrations in protest against several controversial government proposals, including expanded use of the Russian language in schools, and plans for its designation as a second official language. While the demonstrations were tense at times, the government did not use force and ultimately agreed to mediation by the Council of Europe.

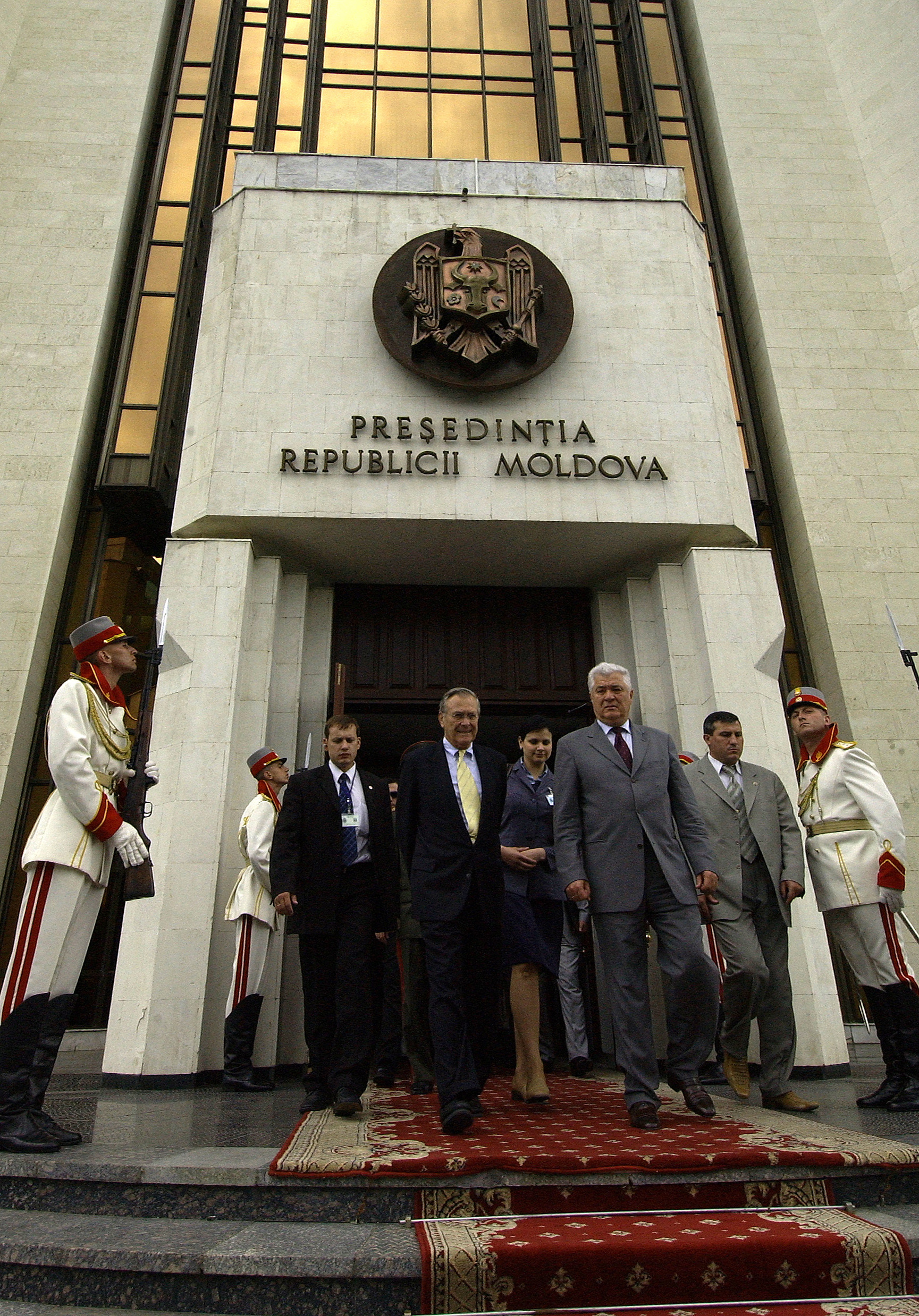
Voronin with Donald Rumsfeld

In 2003, Voronin's government backtracked over signing a Russian-proposed federalization settlement with the breakaway region of Transnistria (Kozak memorandum). On the same year, Voronin claimed that "Romania has remained the only empire in Europe, consisting of Moldavia, Dobruja and Transylvania", provoking a diplomatic conflict with Romania and the president of Romania Ion Iliescu. In 2004, Voronin branded the leadership of Transnistria "a transnational criminal group", and ordered an economic blockade of Transnistria after its authorities closed several Romanian-speaking schools.

=== Second mandate ===
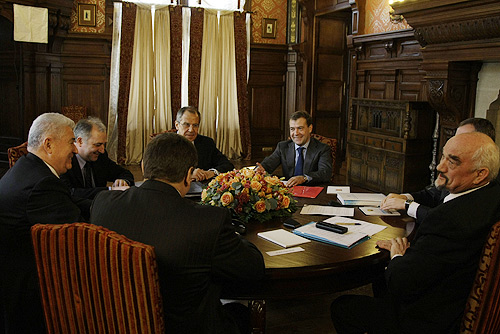
Voronin at a meeting with Medvedev and Smirnov in Barvikha on 18 February 2009, at which Transnistria issues were discussed

In the parliamentary election in March 2005, the PCRM received 46.1% of the vote and won 56 seats in the 101-member Parliament — more than enough for the 51-vote minimum required to remain in government, but short of the 61 votes necessary to elect a president. However, President Voronin received the necessary support from the Christian Democratic People's Party, the Democratic and Social Liberal factions, after he promised to deliver on needed reforms and Euro-Atlantic integration for the country. (The latter two factions broke away from the Electoral Bloc "Moldova Democrată" following the election, leaving the Our Moldova Alliance (AMN) of the former mayor of Chişinău Serafim Urechean as the second-largest party in Parliament, with 26 seats.) In the presidential election held in Parliament on 4 April 2005, Voronin was re-elected with 75 votes; another candidate, Gheorghe Duca, received one vote, and two votes were invalid.

==== Political agenda during tenure ====
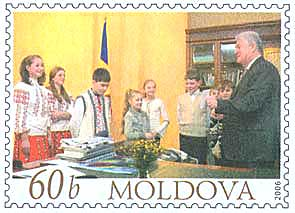
2006 stamp

The declared main goals of his political agenda were:

- Closer ties with the Russian Federation and "integration in Europe"; solving the Transnistria conflict; EU cooperation (and membership if possible); strong opposition to NATO membership; independence, as opposed to a unification with Romania.

=== Events of 2009 and resignation ===
After the parliamentary election held on 5 April 2009, the PCRM won 49.48% of the vote and 60 seats, one seat too few to elect a president. Voronin was elected Speaker of the Parliament and retained the Presidency of Moldova with an interim status. The police crackdown of the civil unrest in April 2009 antagonized the society, and the communists were unable to secure one additional vote out of the 41 MPs from the three opposition parties; a snap parliamentary election was necessary.

In the snap parliamentary election in July 2009, the PCRM won 44.69% of the vote, which is more votes than any other individual party, and gained 48 seats, but it lost its parliamentary majority to a coalition of opposition parties which has 53 seats. However, the opposition also failed to obtain enough seats to elect a president, thereby producing more uncertainty. Voronin announced on 2 September 2009 that he intended to resign, saying that his position as acting President had become "ambiguous and doubtful". He resigned on 11 September 2009. The president sent a letter to Parliament confirming his intention to resign. Mihai Ghimpu succeeded Voronin as acting president until a proper President could be elected.

== Post-presidential years ==
The pro-Western parliamentary majority on 29 December 2009 blocked Voronin's election to Moldova's permanent delegation at the Parliamentary Assembly of the Council of Europe in Strasbourg. In February 2010, Vladimir Voronin and his wife returned the diplomatic passports which they were keeping illegally.

According to the last opinion polls carried out in 2019 regarding the most popular politicians of the Republic of Moldova, Vladimir Voronin is ranked on the seventh position among the top of politicians which enjoyed the highest trust of Moldovans and according to some other polls he is ranked at the eighth position.

In 2023, he criticized the authorities, saying that a fascist dictatorship has been established in the country, depriving people of the right to free expression, the right to freedom of speech, the right to convey their position in their native language. Vladimir Voronin spoke about the closure in the last two years of 12 TV channels, dozens of information portals and periodicals, which – strictly within the law and constitutional rights – periodically criticized the authorities.

=== Political views ===
Though Voronin identifies himself as a left-wing politician, he is strongly conservative on social issues. He is against immigration and he rejects the building of mosques in Moldova, as well as LGBT rights. His remarks towards the African-born activist John Onoje ("They [the ruling parties] brought here a Negro, who'd just climbed down from a tree, and now he's doing politics for them.") are still regarded as controversial.

Despite the fact that his grandfather Isidor Sârbu emigrated to Romania, Voronin considers Moldovans and Romanians two different ethnic groups. Some of his declarations were considered anti-Romanian.

== Relations with Russia ==
In 2001, Moldovan Communist Vladimir Voronin had a clearly pro-Russian stance, opposing “pro-European” forces and pro-Romanian Unionists. Active Russian support helped Voronin to get convertible into votes the sympathy of the Russian-speaking population of Moldova, labour migrants in Russia and their families, residents of the Gagauz autonomy and Transnistrians, not to mention the most active part of the Moldovan electorate – pensioners. However, after one of these victories, the Moldovan leader launched the process of European integration, forgot about the promises made during the electoral struggle about the status of the Russian language and about constructive negotiations on Transnistria, after which his relations with the Russian Federation noticeably deteriorated.

In 2009, Vladimir Voronin paid a private visit to the dacha of Russian President Dmitry Medvedev. Completing his second and last (according to the Moldovan constitution) presidential term, Voronin hoped to take the important Moldovan position of Speaker of Parliament, for which his faction needed at least four additional votes. The purpose of Voronin's visit was probably to persuade the Russian government to persuade some Moldovan party leaders to support the Communist faction in order to prevent oppositionists who support Moldova's European integration from taking power.

In 2013, on the occasion of his party's 20th anniversary, Communist leader Vladimir Voronin lamented the collapse of the Soviet Union and advocated for Moldova's integration into the Russia-dominated Customs Union. Voronin criticized the then Moldovan leaders, accusing them of being corrupt, refusing to reintegrate Transnistria, and subordinating themselves to international financial institutions that allegedly do not act in the interests of the Moldovan people.

Voronin led the Communist Party of Moldova for more than twenty years. In 2015, in an interview for the special project “Russia and I. In the Shadow of the Kremlin,” he said that as president he rejected Russia's plan to grant broad powers to separatist Transnistria. Since then, he admits, relations with Moscow have “cooled considerably.” He viewed relations with Russia through the prism of strategic partnership and active integration process within the CIS.

== The Voronin family and corruption ==
From 1999 to 2006, firms controlled by the Voronin family received free or for nothing 4 hectares of land in the most expensive zone of the city – opposite the Valea Morilor park. According to cadastral documents, the elite real estate built there belongs to the members of the ex-president's family: his son Oleg Voronin, grandson Aleksei Voronin, daughter Valentina Rusu and companies related to them.

The family of Vladimir Voronin enjoys a strong reputation as the richest family in Moldova. Despite numerous accusations from both political parties and a number of media outlets, law enforcement agencies said they had found no confirmation of such information. According to a 2007 poll, Vladimir Voronin was regarded as the wealthiest man in Moldova.

In 2009, according to a poll conducted by the website vedomosti.md, Vladimir Voronin became the leader of the rating of corruptors, gaining 45.25% of the voters.

In 2010, the son of the former president was checked for involvement in money laundering and tax evasion. The Center for Combating Economic Crimes and Corruption is investigating the relevant criminal cases. The offices of companies owned by Oleg Voronin were searched. At the same time, officially, as reported, he is neither a suspect nor an accused. The investigation was preceded by the appearance in the media of printouts of transactions from a bank card allegedly belonging to Vladimir Voronin's son. According to this data, the owner of the card in 2008–2009 spent about five million dollars on shopping in expensive stores and staying in luxury hotels. At the same time, the income declaration of Voronin Jr. reportedly showed a much smaller amount. He himself denied the rumours about his super-income. Moldovan media have long written that the Voronin family's business is estimated at €2 billion. After two years, the investigation of the case was closed due to lack of corpus delicti.

Vladimir Voronin is considered one of the richest people in Moldova. His income is estimated at about 700 million USD, there are data on his real estate in California (USA), Greece and Baden-Baden (Germany), also on a private sanatorium in Karlovy Vary (Czech Republic), a collection of new cars, ownership of valuable plots of land in Moldova.

The leader of the Party of Communists of the Republic of Moldova started actively buying real estate abroad around 2002. Among the purchases are hotels, stores, mansions, villas and land plots in Austria for more than 200 million euros; a mansion in an elite district of Munich (Germany) for 7.5 million euros and a Falcon-900 airplane for 35 million euros. According to media reports, the plane was on standby to fly Voronin's family out in case of danger. A considerable amount of money was also allocated from the state budget for the president's flights: for eight years it amounted to approximately 27 million lei. It is known that in 2007–2008 the Ministry of Finance transferred an average of 5 million lei to the accounts of the airline “Nobil Air”, which transported Voronin and which is linked to the Moldovan oligarch Plahotniuc. Vladimir Voronin is known for his collection of cars. Timpul journalists write about an entire garage of luxury and retro cars in the basement of the new PCRM office on the capital's Armenească Street. Voronin's collection is estimated at more than 10 million lei in Moldova alone. There are also statements about cars in Germany. And also that the Voronin family has a mansion between French Strasbourg and German Baden-Baden. The PCRM chairman's son, Oleg Voronin, owns a Maybach worth 500 thousand euros, two Mercedes-600s worth 120 thousand euros each, Mercedes and Hummer jeeps worth 100 thousand dollars each.

In 2019, Vladimir Voronin's family was again in the epicentre of scandal. The National Bank of Moldova caught Oleg Voronin's group shareholders in collusion and obliged them to sell their shares. According to the NBM, a group of Fincombank's shareholders consensually bought a significant share of the bank's shares – 36.15% without prior authorization of the National Bank. Thus, the shareholders violated the law “On banks' activity” and, according to the NBM decision, had to sell their shares. The largest shareholder was Oleg, who together with his family members, including the wife of ex-president Vladimir Voronin, owned 23.54% of shares. According to the National Bank, the company Avicomagro acted in collusion with Voronin's family. Oleg Voronin lost his shares in Fincombank. The National Commission for Financial Market has decided to exclude from the State Register of Securities 475478 common registered shares of Fincombank, most of which belonged to Oleg Voronin's family.

== Accusations of racism ==
On 18 February 2012, Vladimir Voronin publicly insulted a Moldovan political activist of Sierra Leonean origin, John Onoje, pointing to his skin color. Amnesty International called on the prosecutor's office and Moldovan MPs to investigate the incident and punish Voronin.

In 2021, the leader of the Party of Communists, Vladimir Voronin, was reported to the Council for the Prevention and Elimination of Discrimination and Equality. Vlad Bilețchi, leader of the Alliance for the Union of Romanians (AUR)'s branch in Moldova, demanded that Voronin's words that “with the arrival of NATO” ‘brown children’ will be born in Moldova” be recognized as xenophobic and racist.

== Personal life ==
Vladimir Voronin is married to Taisia Mihailovna Voronina (a Ukrainian) and has two children, a son Oleg and a daughter Valentina. She works as a kindergarten manager, They were married on 12 October 1962, while he was still working in Criuleni. He has the military rank of Major General from the former USSR Ministry of Internal Affairs (equivalent of NATO OF-6 Brigadier General – see Ranks and insignia of the Soviet military and Ranks and insignia of NATO). Some argue that he also holds Russian citizenship in addition to citizenship of the Republic of Moldova, because he used to receive a pension as a former Russian Ministry of Internal Affairs employee, from the time he lived as a private citizen in Moscow in 1991–1993. His son, Oleg Voronin, is arguably the richest businessman in Moldova. His daughter is a physician, but unlike Oleg not a public figure. On 19 February 2010, Voronin told journalists that the questioning of his son is an attempt of revenge against his family by the current authorities. Oleg is suspected of fiscal evasion and money laundering.

== Honours and awards ==
- Order of Prince Yaroslav the Wise I degree (24 May 2006)
- Order of the Holy Blessed Governor Ștefan cel Mare I degree (Orthodox Church of Moldova, 25 May 2006)
- Order of the Saviour (13 June 2007)
- Grand Order of King Tomislav (Croatia, 17 February 2009)
- Order of the "Stara Planina" (Bulgaria, 12 March 2009)
- Order of the Cross of the Holy Sepulchre (Jerusalem Orthodox Church, 23 June 2009)
- Order of Holy Prince Daniel of Moscow (Russian Orthodox Church, 10 October 2011)

Political offices
Preceded by Petru Lucinschi	President of Moldova; 2001–2009	Succeeded by Mihai Ghimpu; Acting
