= Zinaida Greceanîi =

Prime Minister of Moldova from 2008 to 2009

Zinaida Greceanîi MP OR
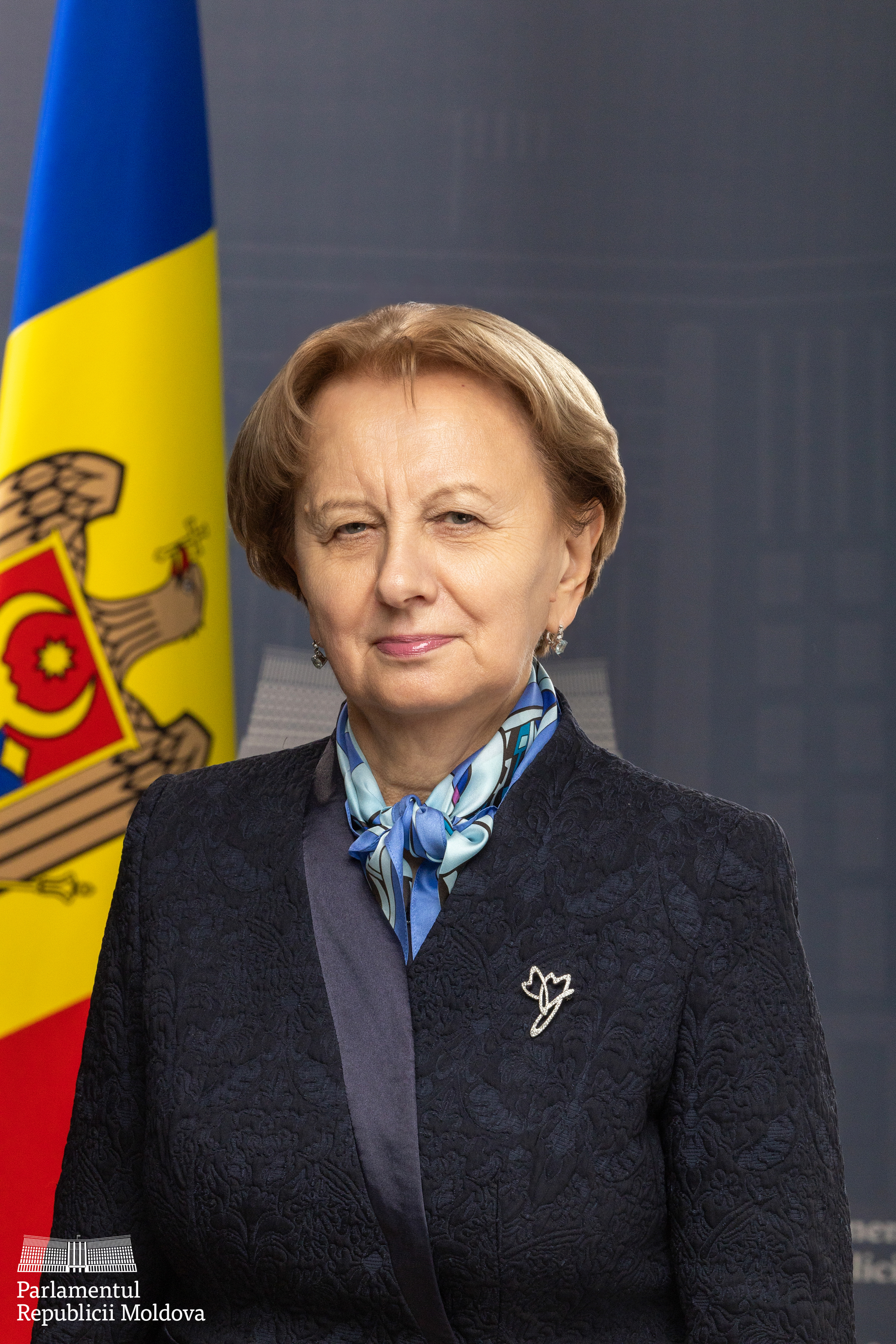
- Official portrait, 2025

Member of the Moldovan Parliament
- Incumbent
- Assumed office 29 July 2009
- Parliamentary group: Party of Communists; Party of Socialists; Bloc of Communists and Socialists

12th President of the Moldovan Parliament
- In office 8 June 2019 – 26 July 2021
- President: Igor Dodon; Maia Sandu
- Prime Minister: Maia Sandu; Ion Chicu; Aureliu Ciocoi (acting)
- Deputy: See list: Ion Ceban Mihai Popșoi Alexandru Slusari Monica Babuc Vlad Batrîncea Vladimir Vitiuc
- Preceded by: Andrian Candu
- Succeeded by: Igor Grosu

President of the Party of Socialists
- In office 18 December 2016 – 30 December 2020
- Preceded by: Igor Dodon
- Succeeded by: Igor Dodon

7th Prime Minister of Moldova
- In office 31 March 2008 – 14 September 2009
- President: Vladimir Voronin; Mihai Ghimpu (acting)
- Deputy: See list: Igor Dodon Andrei Stratan Victor Stepaniuc Valentin Mejinschi Iurie Roșca
- Preceded by: Vasile Tarlev
- Succeeded by: Vitalie Pîrlog (acting)

First Deputy Prime Minister of Moldova
- In office 10 October 2005 – 31 March 2008
- President: Vladimir Voronin
- Prime Minister: Vasile Tarlev
- Preceded by: Vasile Iovv
- Succeeded by: Igor Dodon

Minister of Finance
- In office 26 February 2002 – 10 October 2005
- President: Vladimir Voronin
- Prime Minister: Vasile Tarlev
- Preceded by: Mihail Manoli
- Succeeded by: Mihail Pop

First Deputy Minister of Finance
- In office 26 September 2001 – 26 February 2002
- President: Vladimir Voronin
- Prime Minister: Vasile Tarlev
- Minister: Mihail Manoli

Deputy Minister of Finance
- In office 19 January 2000 – 26 September 2001
- President: Petru Lucinschi; Vladimir Voronin
- Prime Minister: Dumitru Braghiș; Vasile Tarlev
- Minister: Mihail Manoli

Personal details
- Born: Zinaida Bujor; 7 February 1956 (age 70) Metalist, Russian SFSR, Soviet Union (now Russia)
- Citizenship: Moldova
- Party: Party of Communists (before 2011); Party of Socialists (2011–present)
- Spouse: Alexei Greceanîi
- Children: 2
- Education: Moldova State University

Zinaida Greceanîi (Note: Also given as Zinaida Petrovna Greceanaia, the Russian-style form of the name used in Soviet Moldova.) (Romanian: [zinaˈida greˈtʃanɨi̯]; born 7 February 1956) is a Moldovan politician. She was the president of the Moldovan Parliament between 8 June 2019 to 26 July 2021. Greceanîi was previously also the Prime Minister of Moldova from 31 March 2008 to 14 September 2009. She led the Party of Socialists of the Republic of Moldova (PSRM) from 2016 to 2020 and was previously a member of the Party of Communists of the Republic of Moldova (PCRM). She was Moldova's first female prime minister and was the second female Communist head of government in Europe, preceded only by Prime Minister Milka Planinc of the Socialist Federal Republic of Yugoslavia. She has been referred to by her colleagues in PSRM as the "Moldovan Margaret Thatcher".

== Background ==
Greceanîi was born in Tomsk Oblast in Siberia in the Russian SFSR of the Soviet Union. Her parents, Marioara Ursu (1918–1993) and Petrea Bujor (1906–1996), were deported in 1951 from Cotiujeni in the north of Moldova during Operation North because they were Jehovah's Witnesses. Her brother died during the deportation. Zinaida Greceanîi and her parents came back to Cotiujeni only in 1968. She was baptised as Eastern Orthodox by her grandmother on mother's side.

She graduated from the Financial and Economic College in the capital Chișinău and Moldova State University.

Greceanîi is married to Alexei Greceanîi and has two children.

== Career ==
In the mid 1990s, Greceanîi was employed as a head of the Department at the Ministry of Finance. She was deputy minister of finances from 2000 to 2001 and first deputy minister of finances from 2001 to 2002. President Vladimir Voronin appointed Greceanîi as interim minister of finances on 8 February 2002 and then appointed her as minister of finances on 26 February 2002 as the only woman in the cabinet.

In the summer 2005, Greceanîi won the 2005 Chișinău election, but it was declared invalid because of the low turnout. On 10 October 2005, Greceanîi was appointed by Voronin as First Deputy Prime Minister of Moldova on 10 October 2005.

According to a 2019 opinion poll, Greceanii was the second most trusted politician in Moldova, and according to some other polls she was given the sixth and at the eighth rank accordingly.

== Prime minister ==
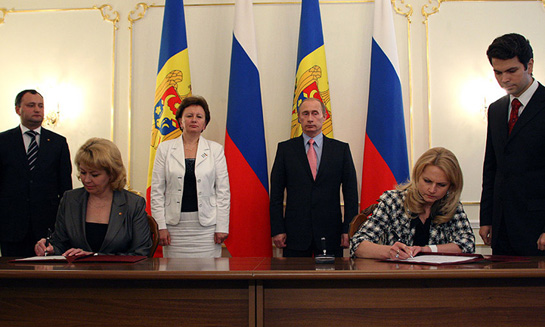
Greceanîi with former Russian prime minister Vladimir Putin in June 2008.

Following the resignation of Prime Minister Vasile Tarlev on 19 March 2008, President Vladimir Voronin nominated Greceanîi as prime minister. The Cabinet of Zinaida Greceanîi was approved by Parliament on 31 March; it received 56 votes in favor out of the 101 members of Parliament. According to Greceanîi, the immediate focus of her Cabinet would be on "freedom of the media, an active dialogue with civil society and an independent judiciary". She increased the number of women ministers from 2 to 5 (25 per cent) and followed up on laws of gender equality.

Greceanîi resigned on 9 September 2009, saying she was unable to simultaneously hold the posts of prime minister and member of parliament at the same time. On 10 September 2009, Moldova's president Vladimir Voronin signed a decree appointing Justice Minister Vitalie Pîrlog as acting prime minister from 14 September until a new government was formed.

=== Events of 7 April 2009 ===
Zinaida Greceanîi, the prime minister of the Republic of Moldova, within the events of 7 April 2009, became famous in the public space by her symbolic statements, that the policemen are ready to use the weapons against the protesters, and came with the message: "The organizers of the biggest crime are ready to use children in the next days. If this will happen, to avoid casualties would be very hard. The police will use all necessary measure to defence the constitutionality, including the weapons". Six years later, in April 2015, Greceanîi stated at the Interpol TV-show, broadcast by TV7, that she did right when she declared in 2009 "that there will be bloodshed".

In the investigation of the events of 7 April Zinaida Greceanîi, who has remained in history by her statement, when she begged the country's "mothers" to keep their children at home, because of the weapons that had to be used. In this respect, she has been heard once by the prosecutors, and event then, as a witness.

== Moldovan presidential election, May–June 2009 ==
Her party won the April 2009 election with 49.48% of the vote and she won one of the 60 seats of the PCRM in the Moldovan Parliament. She was twice an unsuccessful candidate of the PCRM for the post of the president of Moldova, on 20 May and 3 June 2009, lacking only one vote to obtain the required 3/5 (61) of the votes. In both rounds, alternative male candidates were also nominated by the PCRM and obtained 0 votes and Greceanîi all 60 Communist party votes.

New elections were held and after the July 2009 parliamentary election, Greceanîi again won a seat in the Moldovan Parliament, but the PCRM only got 48 seats and the opposition to the Communist Party, the Alliance for European Integration, agreed to create a governing coalition.

== Leaving the PCRM and joining the PSRM ==
In autumn 2011, Zianida Greceanîi, together with Igor Dodon, left PCRM and joined the Party of Socialists (PSRM) led by Veronica Abramciuc. In 2011, the party leader became Igor Dodon and stayed in this position until 2016. After the Republic of Moldova president election, the acting leader of the Party of Socialists became Zinaida Greceanîi, who on 18 December 2016 was officially elected as party chairman. At the elections of 30 November 2014 Zinaida Greceanîi was at the top position of the PSRM electoral list.

== Subsequent career ==
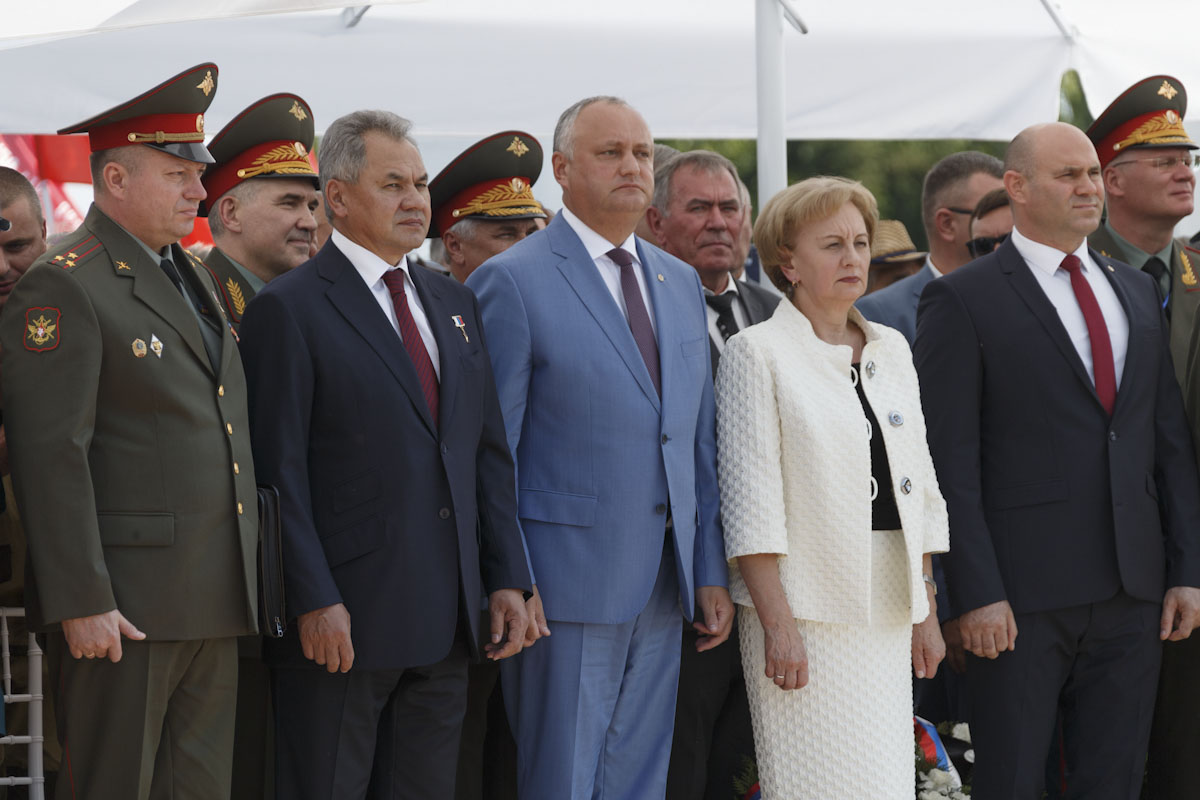
From left to the right: Sergey Shoigu, Igor Dodon, Zinaida Greceanîi and Pavel Voicu in 2019, during the celebration of the Liberation Day

She contested the mayoralty of Chișinău at the 2015 local elections, where she progressed to a run-off against incumbent Dorin Chirtoacă. Ultimately she was unsuccessful, losing to Chirtoacă 46.56% to 53.46% on 28 June.

On 18 November 2016, she was elected Chairman of the Socialist Party, taking office on 23 December 2016. She was elected as 12th President of the Moldovan Parliament 8 June 2019, which sparked a brief 8-day constitutional crisis in the country.

== Controversies ==
=== Import of electricity ===
Zinaida Greceanîi and Igor Dodon were involved in a collusive import scheme of the electricity and became subject to a complaint filed to the Prosecutor General's Office. Since 1 June 2008 Moldova has purchased electricity from Ukraine at a price that was by 10% higher than that paid in May. First Deputy Prime Minister Igor Dodon announced the new price as a "remarkable success", reasoning that, initially, the Ukrainian side demanded a 50% increase. However, the Chișinău corridors were talking about the fact that the price increase was made for the benefit of a company registered in Hungary behind which would be persons delegated by the leadership of Moldova and Ukraine. Following the "negotiations", a private intermediary was included in the Ukrainian import scheme. In the meantime, the energy experts have received more official information from ANRE, which showed that only one year ago the intermediary company got a profit of over 14.5 million dollars from the energy price difference. The Government was responsible for importing electricity. And according to a provision signed by then Prime Minister Zinaida Greceanîi, the negotiating group for the signing the electricity supply contract in Ukraine was composed by Igor Dodon, at that time the minister of economy, Alexandr Gusev, the director of Energocom and Marcu Rimish, from Moldelectrica.

=== Credits from BEM ===
In 2008, Zinaida Greceanîi, was minister of finance, and her husband, Alexei, was the member of the board of directors of Vin Cojusna Factory, a company that took a credit from Banca de Economii (BEM) in the amount of 1.63 million Euro and US$500,000. For the Greceanîi family, was not a problem to get this loan, all the more so since the Ministry of Finance was responsible for the state's package of the BEM assets. Two years ago, in 2010, the Cojusna factory went bankrupt, and in 2011 a certain "Alsvit-print" firm, founded by an off-shore company controlled by Alexei Greceanîi, had bought the assets of the factory, pledged at the bank, with another credit of 40 million of MDL also contracted from BEM. One year after the launch of the Bank of Economy liquidation process, the amounts that came from the sale of the assets and property of the bank are insignificant. The most precious batch auctioned is the Cojusna Wine Factory that came to court after Alexei Greceanîi, the husband of the former prime minister and the current Socialist leader Zinaida Greceanii, has not returned tens of millions of MDL.

On 15 July 2019, the PL leader, Dorin Chirtoacă, presented several documents according to which it was shown that Zinaida Greceanii was involved in getting BEM's credits, which were not returned. He asked Zinaida Greceanii to resign from her position of President of the Moldovan Parliament, accusing her of implication in bank fraud.

=== Integrity ===
Before the parliamentary elections of 28 November 2010, the Civic Initiative for a Clean Parliament, which drew up a list of the candidates with integrity issues, noted that because of the minister of finance, Zinaida Greceanîi Moldova was convicted to the European Court of Human Rights in the case of "Offer Plus" Company, which led the state to pay damages and outstanding debts to the company in the amount of 2.5 million Euro.

== See also ==
- Politics of Moldova

== Notes ==
Political offices
Preceded by Vasile Tarlev	Prime Minister of Moldova; 2008–2009	Succeeded by Vitalie Pîrlog; Acting
