= Lilia Pogolșa =

Moldovan politician (born 1963)

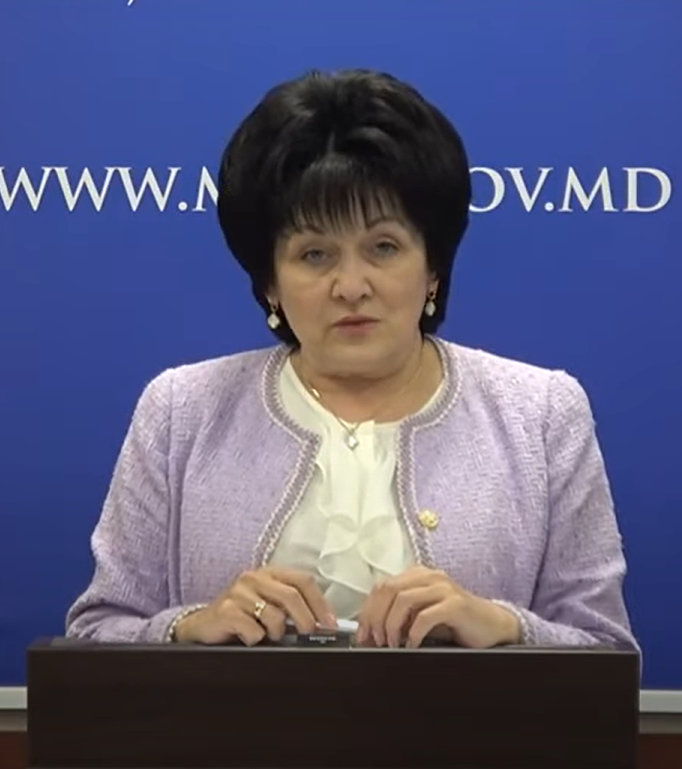
- Pogolșa in 2021

Minister of Education, Culture and Research
- In office 9 November 2020 – 6 August 2021
- President: Igor Dodon; Maia Sandu
- Prime Minister: Ion Chicu; Aureliu Ciocoi (acting)
- Preceded by: Igor Șarov
- Succeeded by: Anatolie Topală (as Minister of Education and Research)

Deputy Minister of Education
- In office 31 May 2017 – 15 November 2017
- President: Igor Dodon
- Prime Minister: Pavel Filip
- Minister: Monica Babuc
- In office 16 December 2002 – 7 October 2003
- President: Vladimir Voronin
- Prime Minister: Vasile Tarlev
- Minister: Gheorghe Sima; Valentin Beniuc

Personal details
- Born: 1 April 1963 (age 63) Onești, Moldavian SSR, Soviet Union

Lilia Pogolșa (born 1 April 1963) is a Moldovan politician. She served as Minister of Education, Culture and Research from 9 November 2020 to 23 December 2020 in the cabinet of Prime Minister Ion Chicu. She also served in this position until 5 August 2021 with Aureliu Ciocoi as Acting Prime Minister.

Political offices
Preceded by Igor Șarov	Minister of Education, Culture and Research; 2020–2021	Succeeded by Anatolie Topală
