= Elections in Moldova =

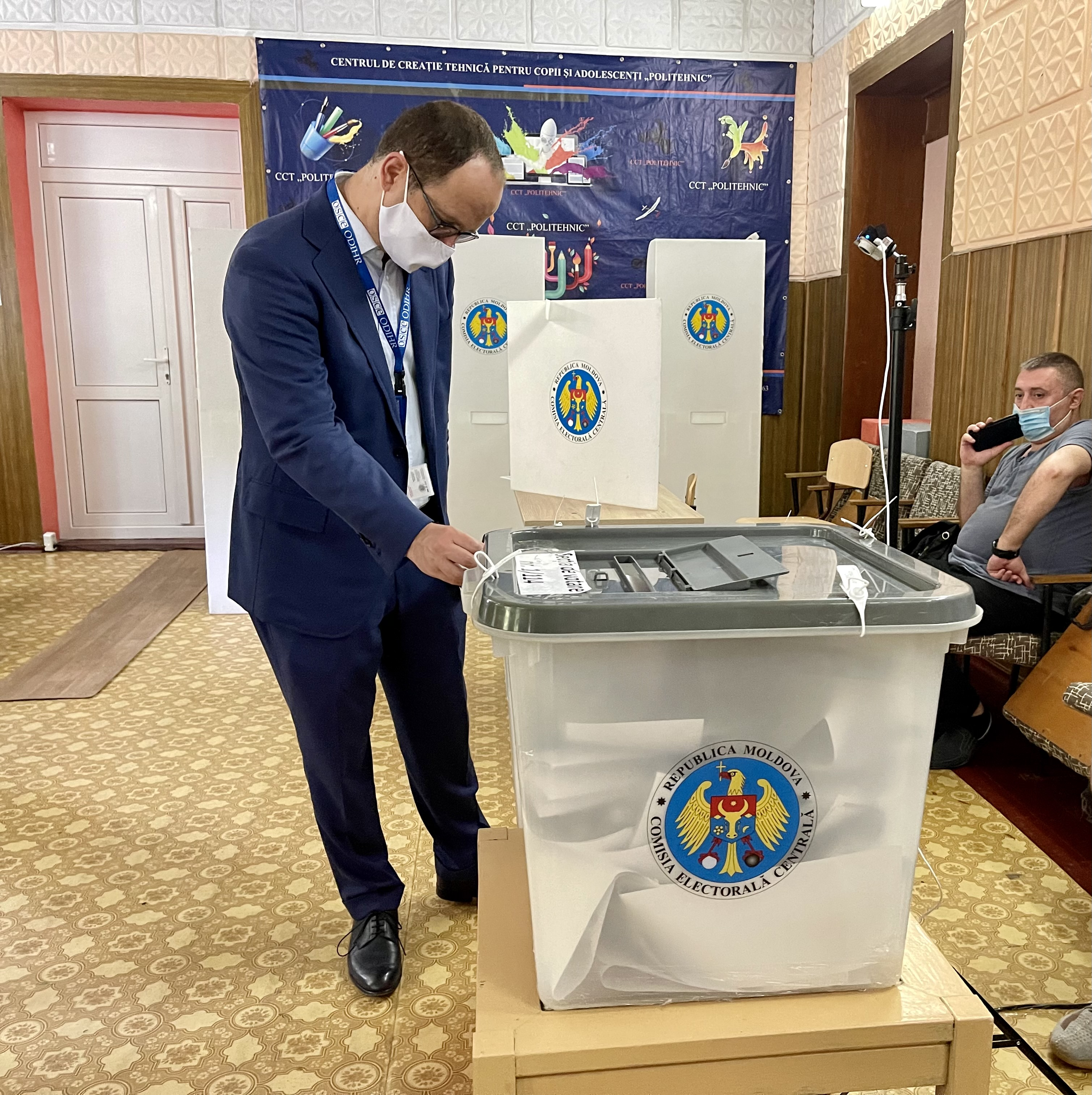
OSCE Co-ordinator observing election procedures in Chișinău

Moldova elects a legislature at national level. The Parliament (Parlamentul) has 101 members, elected for a four-year term by proportional representation with a 2-7% electoral threshold. The President used to be elected for a four-year term by a constitutional majority of 60% members of the Parliament, but a Constitutional Court's ruling on 4 March 2016, reverted the election method of the President to a two-round system direct election.

== Parliamentary elections ==
- 1917 Sfatul Țării election
- 1941 Moldavian Supreme Soviet election
- Elections in the Moldavian SSR, 1946
- Elections in the Moldavian SSR, 1950
- Elections in the Moldavian SSR, 1954
- Elections in the Moldavian SSR, 1958
- Elections in the Moldavian SSR, 1962
- Elections in the Moldavian SSR, 1966
- Elections in the Moldavian SSR, 1970
- Elections in the Moldavian SSR, 1974
- Elections in the Moldavian SSR, 1979
- Elections in the Moldavian SSR, 1984
- 1990 Moldavian Supreme Soviet election
- 1994 Moldovan parliamentary election
- 1998 Moldovan parliamentary election
- 2001 Moldovan parliamentary election
- 2005 Moldovan parliamentary election
- April 2009 Moldovan parliamentary election
- July 2009 Moldovan parliamentary election
- 2010 Moldovan parliamentary election
- 2014 Moldovan parliamentary election
- 2019 Moldovan parliamentary election
- 2021 Moldovan parliamentary election
- 2025 Moldovan parliamentary election

== Local elections ==
- 1995 Moldovan local elections
- 1999 Moldovan local elections
- 2003 Moldovan local elections
- 2007 Moldovan local elections
- 2011 Moldovan local elections
- 2015 Moldovan local elections
- 2019 Moldovan local elections
- 2023 Moldovan local elections

== Presidential elections ==
- 1991 Moldovan presidential election
- 1996 Moldovan presidential election
- 2001 Moldovan presidential election
- 2005 Moldovan presidential election
- May–June 2009 Moldovan presidential election
- November–December 2009 Moldovan presidential election
- 2011–2012 Moldovan presidential election
- 2016 Moldovan presidential election
- 2020 Moldovan presidential election
- 2024 Moldovan presidential election

== Referendums ==
- 1994 Moldovan referendum
- 1999 Moldovan constitutional referendum
- 2010 Moldovan constitutional referendum
- 2019 Moldovan referendum
- 2024 Moldovan European Union membership constitutional referendum

== See also ==
- Electoral calendar
- Electoral system
