= List of airports in Moldova =

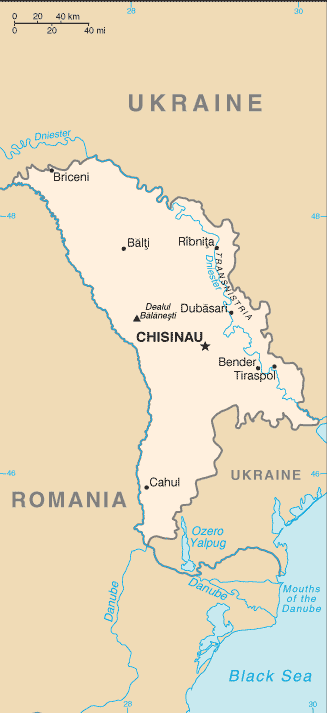
Map of Moldova

This is a list of airports in Moldova, sorted by location.

== Airports ==
Location	ICAO	IATA	Airport name	Coordinates	Usage
Bălți	LUBL	BZY	Bălți International Airport	47.84351°N 27.77953°E	Certified, occasional flights
Călărași			Aerodrome Călărași	47.25230°N 28.28282°E	Local Airfield
Cahul	LUCH		Cahul International Airport	45.84361°N 28.26341°E	Not certified
Chișinău	LUKK	RMO	Chișinău Eugen Doga International Airport	46.92880°N 28.93456°E	Certified, international flights
Crocmaz	LUKE		Vinaria Et Cetera Airstrip	46.45293°N 29.92580°E	Local Airstrip
Horești	LUKH		Aerodrome Horeşti	46.83447°N 28.90188°E	Local Airfield
Mărculești	LUBM		Mărculești Air Force Base	47.85950°N 28.21379°E	Certified for daylight flights only
Tiraspol	LUTR		Tiraspol Airport	46.86858°N 29.58697°E	Not certified
Vadul lui Vodă	LUKV		Vadul lui Vodă Airfield	47.06712°N 29.09372°E	Local Airfield

== Decommissioned airports ==
Location	ICAO	IATA	Airport name	Coordinates	Usage
Alexanderfeld			Alexandefeld Airstrip	45.79407°N 28.42294°E	Abandoned
Baimaclia			Baimaclia Airstrip	46.17870°N 28.38227°E	Abandoned
Bălți			Bălți Aerodrome	47.75056°N 27.91083°E	Ceased operations in 1944
Singureni, 7,5km NW from Bălți			Bălți-Singureni Airfield	47.81389°N 27.86806°E	Ceased operations in 1944
Bălți	LUBA		Bălți City Airport	47.77456°N 27.95586°E	Ceased operations in 2010
Ceadîr-Lunga	LUCL		Ceadîr-Lunga Airport	46.03370°N 28.85312°E	Abandoned
Soroca	LUSR		Soroca Airport	48.19901°N 28.31217°E	Abandoned

== See also ==
- Transport in Moldova
- List of airports by ICAO code: L#LU – Moldova
- Wikipedia:WikiProject Aviation/Airline destination lists: Europe#Moldova, Republic of
