= Igor Șarov =

Moldovan politician (born 1967)

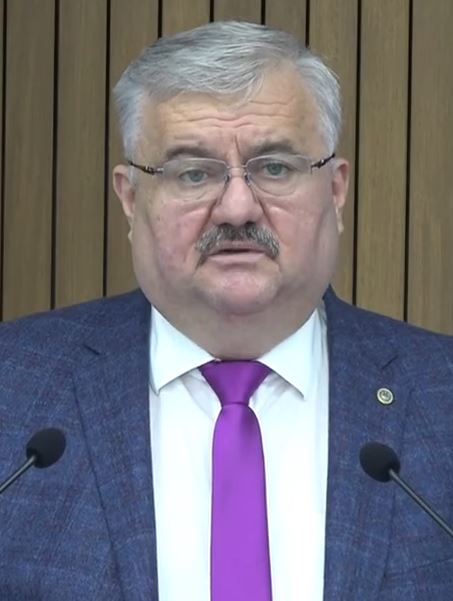
- Șarov in 2020

Rector of Moldova State University
- In office 17 December 2020 – 19 March 2026
- Preceded by: Gheorghe Ciocanu
- Succeeded by: Otilia Dandara

Minister of Education, Culture and Research
- In office 16 March 2020 – 9 November 2020
- President: Igor Dodon
- Prime Minister: Ion Chicu
- Preceded by: Corneliu Popovici
- Succeeded by: Lilia Pogolșa

Secretary General of the Ministry of Education, Culture and Research
- In office 25 October 2017 – 20 June 2019
- President: Igor Dodon
- Prime Minister: Pavel Filip; Maia Sandu
- Minister: Monica Babuc; Liliana Nicolaescu-Onofrei
- Succeeded by: Anatolie Topală

Deputy Minister of Culture
- In office 18 September 2013 – 26 July 2017
- President: Nicolae Timofti; Igor Dodon
- Prime Minister: Iurie Leancă; Chiril Gaburici; Natalia Gherman (acting); Valeriu Streleț; Gheorghe Brega (acting); Pavel Filip
- Minister: Monica Babuc

Personal details
- Born: November 3, 1967 (age 58) Căușeni, Moldavian SSR, Soviet Union
- Education: Moldova State University

Igor Șarov (born 3 November 1967) is a Moldovan professor, historian, editor and former politician who previously held the office of Minister of Education, Culture and Research in the Chicu Cabinet. In 2020 he became the rector of Moldova State University.

He was a member of the Commission for the Study of the Communist Dictatorship in Moldova.

== Education ==
Şarov studied in 1974-1984 at the Secondary School No. 1 in Căușeni, graduating with a gold medal. In 1984-1991 he studied at the State University of Moldova in the Faculty of History, where he graduated with a degree in history and graduated with honors. He completed his doctorate at the same institution in 1992-1995, becoming a doctor in history with the thesis "Bessarabia in Russian historiography".

== Political activity ==
In 2013-2017, he was Deputy Minister of Culture. In October 2017, with the abolition of the positions of Deputy Minister by the Filip Cabinet, Şarov was appointed Secretary General at the Ministry of Education, Culture and Research. He was dismissed in August 2019 by the Sandu Cabinet.

On 16 March 2020, Șarov was appointed Minister of Education, Culture and Research in the Chicu Cabinet, replacing Corneliu Popovici following an agreement between the parliamentary majority parties PSRM and PDM. On 9 November 2020, following the cooling of relations between the two parties, Șarov and several other ministers were dismissed from office. He was replaced by Lilia Pogolșa.

== Awards and recognition ==
In 2017, Igor Şarov received the title of Honorary Citizen of the Causeni District, for his contribution to the development of the district and his involvement in the restoration of the "Assumption of the Virgin Mary" Church in Causeni.
