= Social Democratic Alliance (disambiguation) =

Social Democratic Alliance may refer to:

- Social Democratic Alliance, a political party in Iceland
- Social Democratic Alliance of Moldova, a defunct political party in Moldova
- Social Democratic Alliance (UK), a defunct political party in the United Kingdom
- Social Democratic Alliance, the name used by the National Social Democratic Front in South Vietnam from 1973 to 1975
