= Iacob Popovici =

Moldovan politician

Member of the Moldovan Parliament
- In office 27 November 2003 – 24 March 2005
- Preceded by: Mihail Plămădeală
- Parliamentary group: Braghiș Alliance

Head of the Office of the President of Moldova
- In office 3 July 1998 – 5 April 2001
- President: Petru Lucinschi
- Preceded by: Emil Ciobu
- Succeeded by: Artur Reșetnicov

Minister of Education, Youth and Sport
- In office 24 January 1997 – 22 May 1998
- President: Petru Lucinschi
- Prime Minister: Ion Ciubuc
- Preceded by: Petru Gaugaș
- Succeeded by: Anatol Grimalschi

Personal details
- Born: 4 May 1939
- Died: 2 April 2016 (aged 76)

Iacob Popovici (4 May 1939 – 2 April 2016) was a Moldovan physicist and politician. He served as the Minister of Education of Moldova from 1997 to 1998.
