= Singureni =

Singureni may refer to:

- Singureni, a commune in Giurgiu County, Romania
- Singureni, a commune in Rîșcani District, Moldova
