= Bălți-Singureni Airfield =

Defunct airport in Moldova, next to highway

Bălți-Singureni Airfield Aerodromul Bălți-Singureni
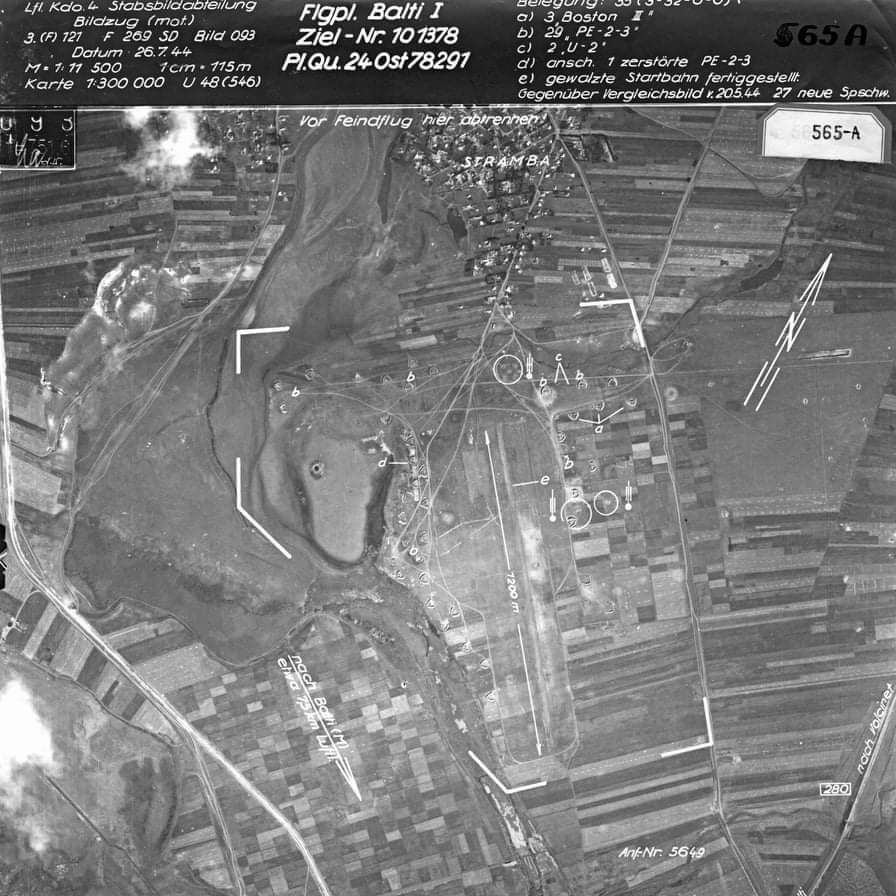
- Bălți-Singureni Airfield Luftwaffe aerial image (1944)
- IATA: none; ICAO: none

Summary
- Airport type: Military during Second World War (until 1944)
- Operator: 55th Fighter Aviation Regiment (IAP-55); Jagdgeschwader 77; Kampfgeschwader 27; Kampfgeschwader 51; White Squadron
- Serves: Bălți
- Location: Singureni, 7,5km north-west from Bălți, Moldova, next to M5 highway
- Closed: 1944
- Coordinates: 47°48′50″N 27°52′05″E

Map
- Location in Moldova

Bălți-Singureni Airfield (Romanian: Aerodromul Bălți-Singureni, Russian: Аэродром Бельцы-Сингурены), also known as Bălți Airfield, was the first Soviet military airfield of Bălți (in its suburb Singureni) immediately after Bessarabia was annexed by the USSR from the Kingdom of Romania.

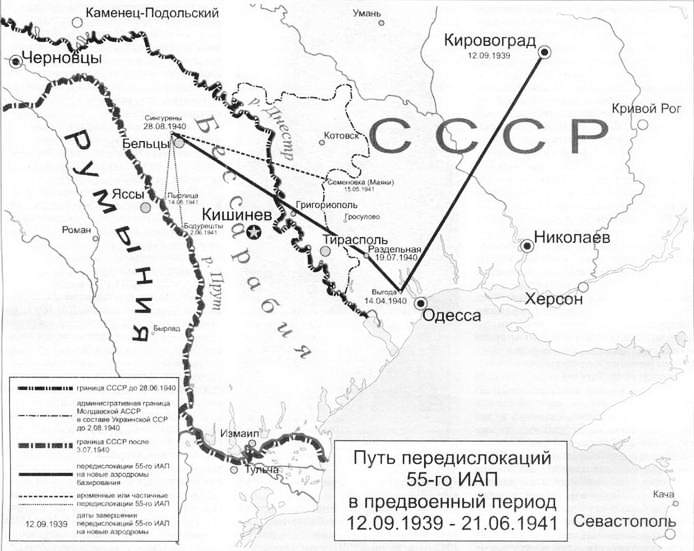
IAP 55 Aviation Fighter Regiment transferred from Kirovograd to Bălți-Singureni airfield

During World War II, the site was selected by Soviet authorities for transfer of military squadrons from Kirovograd, and, together with the then Bălți-City Airfield developed next to former Romanian military polygon and used in its turn as a training airfield in Bălți for the Singureni located airfield, was the main military air base of Bălți in the Soviet period, with different auxiliary military airfield in the Moldavian SSR and in the Ukrainian SSR.

Starting from December 1, 1940, the Soviet 55th Fighter Aviation Regiment, started being based at the 'Bălți' airfield near Singureni, where it was re-equipped with MiG-3 fighters.

== Vulnerability of Bălți-Singureni Airfield ==
Alexander Pokryshkin described the vulnerability of the Bălți-Singureni airfield in his memoir Know Yourself in Battle. He recalled how aviation fuel tanks were dangerously exposed on a hill, next to airfield. Pokryshkin also pointed out the difficulties of using the airfield during spring: due to soft and muddy ground, aircraft would bog down, leading to frequent landing gear failures. Grigory Rechkalov, in his memoir In the Skies of Moldova, described the aftermath of German air raids. These recollections highlight both the strategic significance of the Singureni airfield and its high exposure to Axis bombing in the early days of the war.

== Testimonies from Soviet Pilots ==
The importance and vulnerabilities of the Bălți-Singureni airfield were highlighted in the memoirs of Soviet flying aces who served there in 1940–1941.

In spring, the ground turns to mud. Aircraft bog down to their axles. Landing gear breaks. You can't take off. Only concrete saves you. We understood—without concrete strips, there is no aviation.

— Alexander Pokryshkin, Know Yourself in Combat (Russian: Познать себя в бою), Moscow: Voenizdat, 1985.

Beneath the wheels—earth, not concrete. In the rain, it turns to slush. You accelerate—and sink like in a swamp. It was good they had started to lay concrete on part of the strip, but the war came too early...

— Grigory Rechkalov, In the Sky of Moldova (Russian: В небе Молдавии), Chișinău: Cartea Moldovenească, 1967.

== See also ==
- Bălți Aerodrome
- Bălți City Airport
