= Anatolie Topală =

Moldovan mathematician and politician

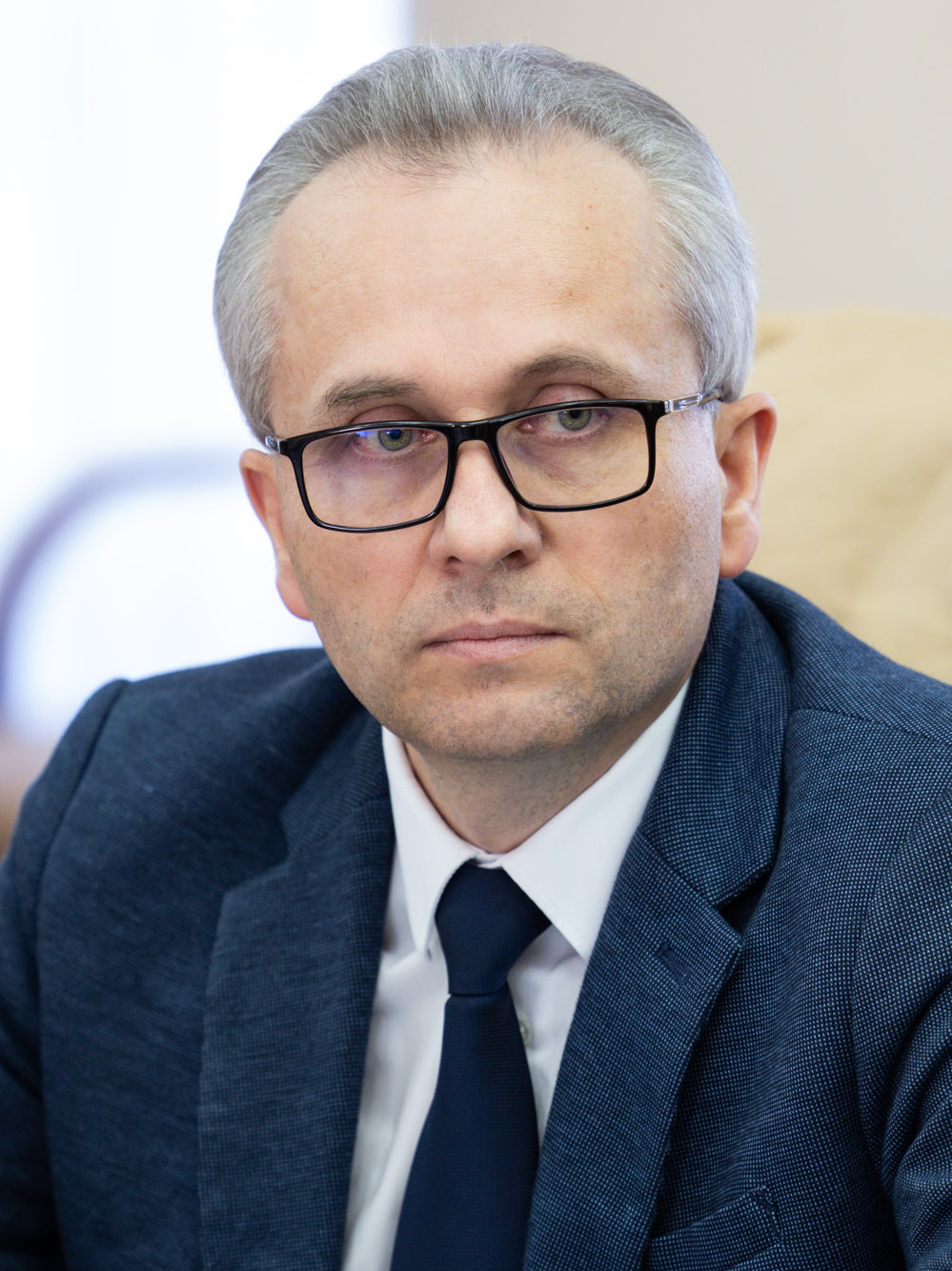
- Topală in 2023

Minister of Education and Research
- In office 6 August 2021 – 14 July 2023
- President: Maia Sandu
- Prime Minister: Natalia Gavrilița; Dorin Recean
- Preceded by: Lilia Pogolșa (as Minister of Education, Culture and Research)
- Succeeded by: Dan Perciun

Secretary General of the Ministry of Education, Culture and Research
- In office 1 November 2019 – 6 August 2021
- President: Igor Dodon; Maia Sandu
- Prime Minister: Maia Sandu; Ion Chicu; Aureliu Ciocoi (acting)
- Minister: Liliana Nicolaescu-Onofrei; Corneliu Popovici; Igor Șarov; Lilia Pogolșa
- Preceded by: Igor Șarov
- Succeeded by: Nadejda Velișco

Personal details
- Born: 27 October 1970 (age 55) Sadova, Moldavian SSR, Soviet Union
- Education: Moldova State University (BMath); Academy of Sciences of Moldova (PhD)

Anatolie Topală (pronunciation: [toˈpalə]; born 27 October 1970) is a Moldovan mathematician and politician who served as the Minister of Education and Research of the Republic of Moldova.
