= Christian-Social Union of Moldova =

Political party in Moldova

Christian-Social Union of Moldova Uniunea Creștin-Socială din Moldova
- Abbreviation: UCSM
- President: Gabriel Călin
- Founded: December 6, 1996
- Registered: May 28, 1997
- Ideology: Christian democracy Christian left Russophilia; Formerly: Neoliberalism
- Political position: Centre-left
- National affiliation: PMDP (1998–2001); BeAB (2001–2005)

The Christian-Social Union of Moldova (Romanian: Uniunea Creștin-Socială din Moldova, UCSM), known until 2020 as the New Force Social-Political Movement (Romanian: Mișcarea social-politică “Forța Nouă”, MFN) is a minor political party in Moldova formerly led by Valeriu Pleșca.

== History ==
Registered on 28 May 1997, the party joined the For a Democratic and Prosperous Moldova alliance to contest the 1998 elections. The alliance received 18% of the vote, winning 24 of the 101 seats and becoming the third-largest faction in Parliament. The MSPFN held one seat, taken by Pleşca. It formed the Alliance for Democracy and Reforms coalition together with Democratic Convention of Moldova and the Party of Democratic Forces, which was able to form a government led by Ion Ciubuc.

The party contested the 1999 local elections as part of the Centrist Alliance, which won around 20% of the seats. Prior to the 2001 parliamentary elections the party joined the Braghiş Alliance. The Alliance won 19 seats, one of which was taken by the MSPFN's Pleşca.

Following the 2003 local elections, in which the MSPFN received only 162 votes, winning just two seats across the country, the party did not contest any further elections until the 2011 local elections (although Pleşca did run in the 2010 parliamentary elections as an independent), when it was part of the Third Force alliance that won 41 seats and one mayoralty.

In 2020, the party renamed itself to the Christian-Social Union of Moldova (UCSM). Gabriel Călin became the new party leader in 2025. He promoted false narratives from Russian propaganda and Moldovan pro-Russian politicians such as Igor Dodon and Ilan Shor, such as that the government at the time had sold Moldova to Europe and the United States, that it wanted to drag Moldova into war by following the "Ukrainian scenario" or that it was preparing an invasion of the Moldovan Russia-backed unrecognized breakaway region of Transnistria. Călin also spread falsehoods and speculations about the 2024 Moldovan European Union membership constitutional referendum, the 2025 Moldovan energy crisis and the introduction of visas for Moldovans in member states of the European Union (EU) and the Commonwealth of Independent States (CIS).

Călin was detained on 30 September 2025 over a case regarding the illegal financing of political parties and money laundering; according to national TV channel Moldova 1, law enforcement searches took place targeting several members of the party. According to Moldovan newspaper NewsMaker, under Călin, the UCSM received received funds in cryptocurrencies that would have been transferred through several electronic wallets from a Russian-based stock exchange banned in the EU and believed to be funding Russia's invasion of Ukraine. Pleșca, Călin's predecessor and the party's leader until the eve of the election, was subject to searches on 25 November over illegal financing and corrupt interest in the electoral process, not being retained by the Moldovan Police due to his health conditions. Călin ended up being found guilty of money laundering and illegal party financing, being sentenced on 8 April 2026 with a five-year suspended sentence, a five-year ban on engaging in activities related to political parties and on holding certain positions and a fine of 650,000 lei.

== Ideology ==
As the Christian-Social Union, the party is economically centre-left and follows a Christian democratic ideology. As the New Force Movement, the party adhered to neoliberalism.
