= Topala (surname) =

Topala is a surname. Notable people with the surname include:

- Anatolie Topală (born 1970), Moldovan government minister
- Robert Topala (born 1987), Swedish video game developer
