= Valeriu Pleșca =

Moldovan lawyer and politician

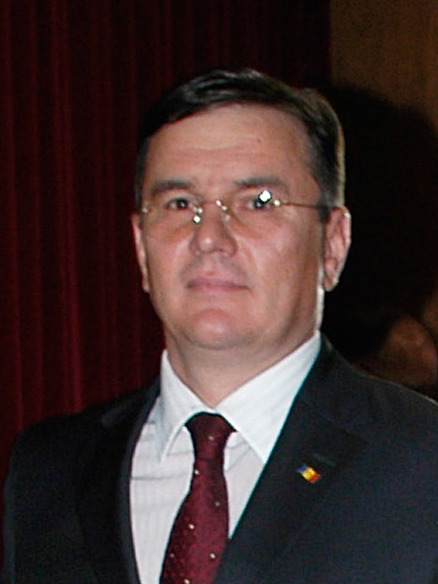
- Pleșca in 2005

Minister of Defense
- In office 29 December 2004 – 11 June 2007
- President: Vladimir Voronin
- Prime Minister: Vasile Tarlev
- Preceded by: Victor Gaiciuc
- Succeeded by: Vitalie Vrabie

Member of the Moldovan Parliament
- In office 22 March 1998 – 29 December 2004
- Parliamentary group: For a Democratic and Prosperous Moldova Electoral Bloc; Braghiș Alliance

Personal details
- Born: 8 November 1958 (age 67) Dumitreni, Moldavian SSR, Soviet Union
- Profession: Lawyer, economist

Valeriu Pleșca (born 8 November 1958) is a Moldovan lawyer and politician. He served as Minister of Defense of Moldova between 29 December 2004 and 11 June 2007.

On 25 November 2025, Pleșca was subject to searches by the Moldovan Police over a case regarding illegal financing and corrupt interest in the electoral process of the 2025 Moldovan parliamentary election, with him not being retained by police due to his health conditions. Pleșca had led the Christian-Social Union of Moldova (UCSM) until the election's eve, when he handed over the party's leadership to journalist Gabriel Călin, who was retained on 30 September over illegal party financing.
