= Valentin Chepteni =

Moldovan politician (born 1973)

Member of the Moldovan Parliament
- In office 25 September 2009 – 28 December 2010
- Preceded by: Leonid Bujor
- Parliamentary group: Our Moldova Alliance
- In office 22 April 2009 – 29 July 2009
- Parliamentary group: Our Moldova Alliance

Personal details
- Born: Chișinău, Moldavian SSR, Soviet Union
- Other political affiliations: Alliance Our Moldova; Alliance for European Integration (2009–present)

Valentin Chepteni (born 27 October 1973) is a Moldovan politician.

== Biography ==
He has been a member of the Parliament of Moldova since 2010. In July 2010, he left Alliance Our Moldova.
