= Maria Sarabaș =

Maria Sarabaş
- Born: January 2, 1948 (age 78); Cîşliţa-Prut, Vulcăneşti
- Education: Moldova State University (1968-1974)
- Political party: Christian-Democratic People's Party (Moldova)
- Awards: Artistă a poporului, 2010

Maria Sarabaş (born 2 January 1948) is a folk music singer from Chişinău, Moldova. She was a member of the Christian-Democratic People's Party (Moldova) and the honorary president of Societatea Doamnelor Creştin-Democrate from 26 November 2000 to June 2005, when Sarabaş left the party.

== Discography ==
- Dragul meu, Badeal meu cu ochi birnaci (S 30 18649-5);
- Bate vintul prin cвmpie, lonel cвnd s-a sculat, Blestemul, Satul meu, grădină dulce, Colind, La căsuţa dintre tei (S 30 29307).

== Awards ==
- Titlul de artistă a poporului, 2010
- Maestru al artei din Republica Moldova (1994);
- Laureată a Festivalului mondial al tineretului şi studenţilor (Moscova, 1985).

== Bibliography ==
- „Sunt pusă on fata alter, nativei — să cant sau so renunţ la căntec", on: „Literatura şi arta", 13. XI. 1986, Chişinău;
- Moroşanu, D., Maria Sarabaş, on: „Femeia Moldovei", nr. 9, 1987, Chişinău;
- „Visez să-mi mai bată la geampasărea-norocul", on: „Moldova", nr. 9, 1988, Chişinău;
- Caciuc, A., Setea Maria Sarabaş, on: „Viaţa satului", 7. XL 1990, Chişinău;
- Morăraş, M. „Mă făcui, maică, frumoasă", on: „Viaţa satului", 4. III. 1994, Chişinău;
- Iuncu, R., 30 de ani de căntec ai Mariei Sarabaş, on: „Flux", 21. VII. 1995, Chişinău.
- Serafim Buzilă, Interpreţi DIN MOLDOVA Lexicon enciclopedic (1460-1960)Chişinău 1996.
