= Larisa Șavga =

Moldovan economist (born 1962)

Larisa Șavga OR

Minister of Education and Youth
- In office 31 March 2008 – 25 September 2009
- President: Vladimir Voronin; Mihai Ghimpu (acting)
- Prime Minister: Zinaida Greceanîi; Vitalie Pîrlog (acting)
- Preceded by: Victor Țvircun
- Succeeded by: Leonid Bujor

Personal details
- Born: 13 March 1962 (age 64) Cioburciu, Moldavian SSR, Soviet Union
- Education: Moldova State University

Larisa Șavga (born 13 March 1962) is a Moldovan economist who served as the Minister of Education of Moldova from 2008 to 2009.
