= Ministry of Education and Research (Moldova) =

Government ministry of Moldova

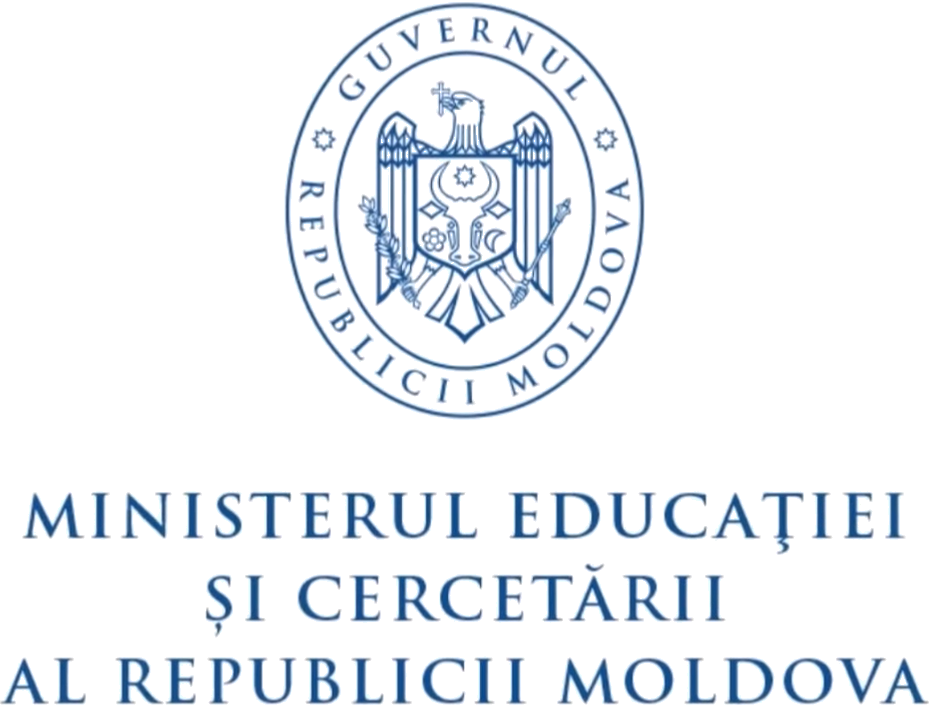

Ministry overview
- Formed: 6 June 1990; 36 years ago (as Ministry of Science and Education)
- Preceding agencies: Ministry of Education, Culture and Research (2017–2021); Ministry of Education and Youth (2005–2009); Ministry of Education and Science (1990–1994), (1998–2001); Ministry of Education, Youth and Sport (1997–1998)
- Jurisdiction: Government of Moldova
- Headquarters: Government House, Chișinău
- Minister responsible: Dan Perciun, Minister of Education and Research
- Ministry executives: Galina Rusu, Secretary General; Adriana Cazacu, Secretary of State; Sergiu Gurin, Secretary of State; Valentina Olaru, Secretary of State; Ludmila Stihi, Secretary of State
- Website: mec.gov.md

The Ministry of Education and Research (Romanian: Ministerul Educației și Cercetării) is one of the fourteen ministries of the government of Moldova. The ministry was established on 27 May 1953.

In 2017, as part of the government reform in Moldova, the Ministry of Culture was renamed to Ministry of Education, Culture and Research, and absorbed the Ministry of Education, and the Ministry of Youth and Sports, becoming their legal successor.

== Ministers ==
No.	Portrait	Name (Birth–Death)	Office term		Cabinet
1		Nicolae Mătcaș (born 1940)	6 June 1990	5 April 1994	Druc; Muravschi; Sangheli I
2		Petru Gaugaș (born 1945)	5 April 1994	24 January 1997	Sangheli II
3		Iacob Popovici (1939–2016)	24 January 1997	22 May 1998	Ciubuc I
4		Anatol Grimalschi (born 1951)	22 May 1998	21 December 1999	Ciubuc II Sturza
5		Ion Guțu (born 1943)	21 December 1999	22 November 2000	Braghiș
6		Ilie Vancea (1949–2021)	22 November 2000	26 February 2002	Braghiș; Tarlev I
7		Gheorghe Sima (born 1952)	26 February 2002	2 July 2003	Tarlev I
8		Valentin Beniuc (born 1956)	5 August 2003	19 April 2005	Tarlev I
9		Victor Țvircun (born 1955)	19 April 2005	31 March 2008	Tarlev II
10		Larisa Șavga (born 1962)	31 March 2008	25 September 2009	Greceanîi I–II
11		Leonid Bujor (1955–2021)	25 September 2009	14 January 2011	Filat I
12	FOTO Mihail Sleahtitchi	Mihail Șleahtițchi (born 1956)	14 January 2011	24 July 2012	Filat II
13		Maia Sandu (born 1972)	24 July 2012	30 July 2015	Filat II; Leancă; Gaburici
14		Corina Fusu (born 1959)	30 July 2015	30 May 2017	Streleț; Filip
15		Monica Babuc (born 1964)	26 July 2017	8 June 2019	Filip
16		Liliana Nicolaescu-Onofrei (born 1968)	8 June 2019	14 November 2019	Sandu
17		Corneliu Popovici (born 1970)	14 November 2019	16 March 2020	Chicu
18		Igor Șarov (born 1967)	16 March 2020	9 November 2020	Chicu
19		Lilia Pogolșa (born 1970)	9 November 2020	6 August 2021	Chicu
20		Anatolie Topală (born 1971)	6 August 2021	14 July 2023	Gavrilița Recean
21		Dan Perciun (born 1991)	17 July 2023	Incumbent	Recean Munteanu Tofan
