= Dumitru Nidelcu =

Moldovan politician (1942–2007)

1st President of the Central Electoral Commission
- In office 16 December 1997 – 18 December 2003
- Succeeded by: Eugeniu Clim

1st Minister of Labour, Social Protection and Family
- In office 30 August 1992 – 30 December 1997
- President: Mircea Snegur; Petru Lucinschi
- Prime Minister: Andrei Sangheli; Ion Ciubuc
- Succeeded by: Vasile Vartic

Personal details
- Born: 1942 Cîșlița-Prut, Moldavian SSR, Soviet Union
- Died: 29 January 2007 (aged 64–65) Chișinău, Moldova

Dumitru Nidelcu (1942 – 29 January 2007) was a Moldovan politician. He served as the Minister of Labour and Social Protection of Moldova from 1992 to 1997.
