= Cahul International Airport =

Cahul International Airport Aeroportul Internațional Cahul
- IATA: none; ICAO: LUCH

Summary
- Airport type: Public
- Owner: Ministry of Defense of the Republic of Moldova
- Operator: State Enterprise Aeroportul İnternatıonal Cahul
- Location: Cahul, Moldova
- Elevation AMSL: 209 m (686 ft)
- Coordinates: 45°50′38″N 28°15′49″E
- Interactive map of Cahul International Airport

Runways
Direction	Length		Surface
Direction	m	ft	Surface
16/34	1,703	5,587	Concrete

Cahul International Airport (ICAO: LUCH) was an airport in southern Moldova, near Cahul. Opened in 1987, it last handled traffic in October 2001, and the company operating it was wound up in 2015. The Civil Aviation Authority stated in 2024 that no airport remained on the site and that the infrastructure needed for commercial flights was absent.

== History ==
The airport was established in 1987 by an order of the Moldavian Directorate of Civil Aviation and received the state registration certificate required for its operation. In 1996 responsibility for it passed from the State Administration of Civil Aviation (ASAC) to the local public authorities of Cahul.

Services from Cahul at that time reached destinations in Russia, Ukraine, Romania and Turkey. The last aircraft left the airport in October 2001, on a service to Istanbul.

The designation of international airport was conferred by Government Decision No. 401 of 2002. According to the Civil Aviation Authority, the change of status was not matched by the investment needed to bring the facilities up to standard. In 2004 the undertaking was reorganised as a joint venture in which the company Intrade Management LTD took part; the authority later described this arrangement as marked by a number of irregularities, among them the absence of a proper inventory of assets and their incorrect valuation. Reporting on the same period, Adevărul wrote that a German investor, Boris Brauda, came to hold 51 per cent of the shares in Aeroportul Internaţional Cahul SRL while Cahul District Council retained 49 per cent, and that renovation work was carried out at the site. Brauda stated that a licence to operate flights was obtained in 2008 but that airlines did not take up the company's offers, and that an undertaking unable to generate revenue while bearing the cost of maintaining the infrastructure was bound to fail. In 2012, following litigation over an unpaid debt, the assets of the airport were made over to the creditor in settlement.

== Insolvency and liquidation ==
On 12 September 2014 the Chișinău Court of Appeal appointed ÎI "Breahnă Filip" as provisional administrator of Aeroportul Internaţional Cahul SRL, after the company's administrator, Pavel Crasovschii, had applied for insolvency proceedings to be opened. Insolvency proceedings followed a month later, and on 30 March 2015 a simplified bankruptcy procedure was opened against the company.

The court ordered the company's liquidation on 27 April 2015, after the liquidator submitted his final report and the liquidation balance sheet. These recorded arrears to the national public budget of 785,769.15 lei, and no further claims were lodged within the period allowed; the liquidator concluded that the debtor held neither assets nor funds with which to meet creditors' claims, and the court ruled the remaining debts extinguished. The decision also provided for the company to be struck off the state register of legal persons. The district council, which held the minority stake, learned of the ruling from a reporter; the council president, Avram Micinschi, said the decision would be challenged but acknowledged that the insolvency could not be halted. During the preceding year the council had repeatedly offered its 49 per cent holding at public auction, asking six million lei for the package, without attracting a buyer.

== Ownership and condition of the site ==
Asked in 2015 what would become of the land and the structures on it, Micinschi said that the roughly 100 hectares of land belonged to Brauda, who had bought it in 2007, while the buildings and other assets remained divided in the same proportion as the shareholding. He added that he was not familiar with the details of that transaction, which had taken place under a previous district president. Adevărul gave the area of the airport as 100.45 hectares.

Public records indicate that since March 2024 the land and the buildings of the former airport, given as 109 hectares, have belonged to a private individual, the businesswoman Tatiana Bodașco. At the end of September 2024 a listing appeared on the classified advertisements platform 999.md offering the property for 2.5 million euros. The advertisement described a fenced and guarded site of 109 hectares, situated 160 km from Chișinău and 9 km from Cahul, with a runway of 1,883 metres surfaced in asphalt and concrete. Bodașco denied that the property was for sale, saying that the listing was a mistake and that she was instead looking for investors to develop the airport.

Responding to the listing, the Civil Aviation Authority stated that the infrastructure on the site was in a critical condition and continuing to deteriorate. The runway, taxiway and apron all required major repairs, and essential elements for the safe conduct of flights, including lighting, signalling and navigation equipment, were absent. Noting that the property rights over the land and the structures rested with a private person, the authority concluded that there was no longer an airport on the site and no infrastructure with which commercial flights could be handled.

== Proposals for a southern airport ==
In January 2024 the Minister of Infrastructure and Regional Development, Andrei Spînu, said that Moldova would acquire further airports once demand justified them. Attention was for the time being concentrated on developing Chișinău International Airport, which had returned to state ownership; should that airport prove unable to cope, he named Bălți or Mărculești in the north and Cahul in the south as the available options. At that date the Cahul site was mothballed and in private hands.

== See also ==
- Moldovan ICAO Airport Codes
- List of airports in Moldova
- Civil Aviation Administration of Moldova
