= 2019 Moldovan referendum =

A non-binding two-part referendum was held in Moldova on 24 February 2019, alongside parliamentary elections. Voters were asked two questions; whether the number of MPs should be reduced from 101 to 61 and whether MPs should be open to recall. Both proposals were approved by voters, with voter turnout above the 33% threshold required to validate the result.

== Campaign ==
Parties were able to formally register as part of the for or against campaigns for both questions.

Question	For	Against
Reducing the number of MPs from 101 to 61	Democratic Party 'Professionals' Movement Speranța-Nadejda	Democracy at Home Party; Party of Communists; People's Will Party
Introducing the right to recall	Democratic Party	Democracy at Home Party; Party of Communists; People's Will Party 'Professionals' Movement Speranța-Nadejda

== Results ==
Question	For		Against		Invalid/ blank	Total votes	Registered voters	Turnout	Result
Question	Votes	%	Votes	%	Invalid/ blank	Total votes	Registered voters	Turnout	Result
Reducing parliament from 101 to 61 seats	744,529	73.66	266,188	26.34	133,544	1,144,261	2,938,095	38.95	Approved
Introducing the right to recall	808,266	79.97	202,497	20.03	132,634	1,143,397	2,937,295	38.93	Approved
Source: CEC
