= Presidential Administration of Moldova =

The Administration of the President of the Republic of Moldova (Romanian: Aparatul Preşedintelui Republicii Moldova) is a state administration body of Moldova that supervises the implementation of the resolutions of the President. The Presidential Administration of Moldova is the public authority that provides organizational, legal, informational and technical assistance to the activity of the President in order to exercise the prerogatives provided for by the Constitution and other laws. It was formed on 16 January 1997 by President Petru Lucinschi with up to 65 personnel.

== Structure ==
- Cabinet of the President of the Republic of Moldova
- Legal Department
- Department of External Relations and Communications
- Advisory Management
- Office of Citizen Relations and Petition Supervision
- National Security Council Service
- Cabinet of Heraldry
- Management and Documentation Department
- Budget and Financial Management
- Human Resources Service
- Administration and Information Security Service
- Main Directorate of Property Administration

=== Current Personnel ===
- Lilia Tonu – Deputy Secretary General
- Veronica Mihailov-Moraru – Judicial Advisor
- Stella Jantuan – Advisor on Political Issues, Relations with Public Authorities and Civil Society
- Stanislav Secrieru – Defense and National Security Advisor – Secretary of the National Security Council
- Olga Roșca – Advisor on Foreign Policy and European Affairs
- Mihaela Fedoseev – Advisor on Inter-institutional Coordination and Organizational Processes
- Ion Mocanu – Advisor for Relations with Religious Denominations
- Nicu Popescu – Special Envoy for European Affairs and Strategic Partnerships
- Dorin Recean – Special Envoy for Development and Resilience

== Secretary Generals ==
- Emil Ciobu (27 January 1997 – 6 July 1998)
- Iacob Popovici (6 July 1998 – 7 April 2001)
- Artur Reșetnicov (7 April 2001 – ?)
- Andrei Spînu (24 December 2020 – 9 August 2021)
- Cristina Gherasimov (8 October 2021 – 10 January 2023)
- Veaceslav Negruța (10 January 2023 – 14 February 2023)
- Andrei Spînu (16 February 2023 – 17 July 2023)
