= Leonid Bujor =

Moldovan politician (1955–2021)

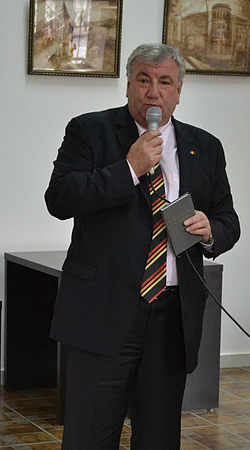
- Bujor in 2010

Minister of Education
- In office 25 September 2009 – 14 January 2011
- President: Mihai Ghimpu (acting); Vladimir Filat (acting); Marian Lupu (acting)
- Prime Minister: Vladimir Filat
- Preceded by: Larisa Șavga
- Succeeded by: Mihail Șleahtițchi

Member of the Moldovan Parliament
- In office 22 March 2005 – 25 September 2009
- Succeeded by: Valentin Chepteni
- Parliamentary group: Democratic Moldova Electoral Bloc; Our Moldova Alliance

Personal details
- Born: 27 November 1955 Singureni, Moldavian SSR, Soviet Union
- Died: 6 January 2021 (aged 65) Chișinău, Moldova
- Party: Party Alliance Our Moldova; Alliance for European Integration (2009–present)
- Children: 2
- Profession: Engineer

Leonid Bujor (27 November 1955 – 6 January 2021) was a Moldovan politician. He was the Minister of Education in the First Vlad Filat Cabinet from 25 September 2009 to 14 January 2011.

== Biography ==
Leonid Bujor was born on 27 November 1955, in Singureni, Rîșcani. He was a member of the Party Alliance Our Moldova. He was deputy in the Parliament of the Republic of Moldova in the Legislature 2005–2009, elected on the lists of the Democratic Moldova Democratic Bloc Party. He was succeeded in the Second Filat Cabinet by Mihail Șleahtițchi. Starting 18 February 2015 till 2 February 2016, he was Deputy Secretary General of the Cabinet of the Republic of Moldova.

On 6 January 2021, amid the COVID-19 pandemic in Moldova, Bujor died from COVID-19 at the age of 65.

== Distinctions and decorations ==
In December 2010 he was decorated with the "Order of Honor" by Interim President of the Republic of Moldova Mihai Ghimpu.
