= Ilie Vancea =

Moldovan politician (1949–2021)

Moldovan Ambassador to Belarus, Latvia, Lithuania, Estonia and CIS
- In office 16 May 2002 – 15 March 2005
- President: Vladimir Voronin
- Prime Minister: Vasile Tarlev
- Preceded by: Nicolae Dudău
- Succeeded by: Ion Filimon

Minister of Education and Science
- In office 22 November 2000 – 26 February 2002
- President: Petru Lucinschi; Vladimir Voronin
- Prime Minister: Dumitru Braghiș; Vasile Tarlev
- Preceded by: Ion Guțu
- Succeeded by: Gheorghe Sima

Personal details
- Born: 26 January 1949 Cîșlița-Prut, Moldavian SSR, Soviet Union
- Died: 26 March 2021 (aged 72) Chișinău, Moldova

Ilie Vancea (26 January 1949 – 26 March 2021) was a Moldovan politician. He served as Minister of Education from 2000 to 2002. He was removed after widespread protests due to his plan to require schoolchildren to learn Russian.
