= Iurie Chiorescu =

Moldovan politician (born 1979)

Member of the Moldovan Parliament
- In office 25 April 2017 – 9 March 2019
- Preceded by: Victor Roșca
- Parliamentary group: Democratic Party
- In office 17 February 2011 – 9 December 2014
- Preceded by: Mihail Șleahtițchi
- Parliamentary group: Liberal Democratic Party

Personal details
- Born: 1 March 1979 (age 47)
- Party: Liberal Democratic Party; Alliance for European Integration (2010–present)

Iurie Chiorescu (born 1 March 1979) is a politician from Moldova. He has served as a member of the Parliament of Moldova since 2011.
