= Movement of Professionals "Hope" =

Movement of Professionals "Hope" Mișcarea Profesioniștilor “Speranța-Надежда”
- Abbreviation: MPSN
- Leader: Andrei Donica
- Founder: Vladimir Florea
- Registered: 30 April 1997
- Membership (2025): 21
- Ideology: Social democracy Anti-corruption; Populism
- Political position: Centre-left
- National affiliation: BSDS (1998); BeAB (2001)
- Slogan: STOP genocid! lit. 'STOP genocide!'

The Movement of Professionals "Hope" (Romanian: Mișcarea Profesioniștilor “Speranța-Надежда”, MPSN) is a political party in Moldova originally led by Vladimir Florea.

== Name ==
The words "speranța" and "надежда" mean "hope" in Romanian and Russian respectively.

== History ==
Registered on 30 April 1997, the party joined the Social Democratic Bloc "Hope" alliance to contest the 1998 elections. However, the alliance received just 1.31% of the vote and failed to win a seat.

Prior to the 2001 elections the party joined the Braghiș Alliance. The Alliance won 19 seats, one of which was taken by the MPSN's Vitalis Mrug.

Following the 2003 local elections, the MPSN won just 21 seats and three mayoralties across the country.

In 2018, controversial activist and mayor of Condrița Andrei Donica became the party leader.

For the 2019 parliamentary election, the party's electoral program included introducing the death penalty for corruption, which would be performed by placing the convict under anaesthesia and harvesting their organs. These would then be donated to citizens who need them to survive. The party did not win any seats.

The party attempted to register for the 2025 parliamentary election, but its request was denied due to its electoral list only consisting of 7 people, less than the required 51.
