= Petru Gaugaș =

Moldovan physicist and former politician

Minister of Education
- In office 5 April 1994 – 24 January 1997
- President: Mircea Snegur; Petru Lucinschi
- Prime Minister: Andrei Sangheli
- Preceded by: Nicolae Mătcaș
- Succeeded by: Iacob Popovici

Personal details
- Born: 1945 (age 80–81)
- Education: Moldova State University

Petru Gaugaș (born 1945) is a Moldovan physicist and former politician. He served as the Minister of Education of Moldova from 1994 to 1997.
