= Aleksandr Klubov =

Soviet flying ace (1918–1944)

Aleksandr Fyodorovich Klubov
- Александр Фёдорович Клубов
- Born: 18 January 1918; Okorokovo, Vologodsky Uyezd, Vologda Governorate, RSFSR
- Died: 1 November 1944 (aged 26); Stalowa Wola, Poland
- Military career
- Allegiance: Soviet Union
- Branch: Soviet Air Force
- Service years: 1941 – 1944
- Rank: Captain
- Unit: 16th Guards Fighter Aviation Regiment
- Conflicts: World War II
- Awards: Hero of the Soviet Union (twice)

Aleksandr Fyodorovich Klubov (Russian: Алекса́ндр Фёдорович Клу́бов, 18 January 1918 – 1 November 1944) a Soviet flying ace during the Second World War who was twice awarded the title Hero of the Soviet Union. During the war he completed 457 sorties, in which he gained at least 31 individual kills, making him one of the highest-scoring Soviet flying aces.

== Early life ==
Klubov was born on 18 January 1918 to a working-class Russian family. His father, who died when Aleksandr was a young child, had served on the Aurora. His oldest brother Aleksey was a farmhand, but bore much of the responsibility of raising Aleksandr and his sister. The family left Okishevo in 1931 where Klubov completed his first four years of school; he live in Yarunovo until 1934, after which he moved to Leningrad where he completed his schooling and began working at a steel mill. Later he worked at a carburetor factory and trained at the local aeroclub before joining the military in January 1939. He went on to graduate from the Chuguev Military Aviation School in October 1940, after which he was assigned to the 84th Fighter Aviation Regiment based in Armenia; the unit used the I-153 fighter.

== World War II ==
Not long after the German invasion of the Soviet Union, Klubov was deployed in August as part of the allied invasion of Iran. He briefly fought in the conflict before returning to his post less than a month later in September. In July 1942 he was deployed to the front of the Battle for the Caucasus as a flight commander. He scored his first aerial victory in August after he shot down a Bf 109 while flying an I-153. He soon increased his tally of victories, but after engaging in one dogfight that resulted in gaining two shared kills of Bf 109s he was shot down. Despite desperately trying to land his I-153, he was forced to parachute out of his stricken plane after suffering serious burns. His face and neck bore scars from the incident long after he was released from the hospital in January 1943. When he returned to his regiment, he began flying missions in the I-16 fighter his regiment had switched to, but he did not score any aerial victories with it. In April his unit was sent away from the warfront for retraining, but in May he and fourteen other pilots from the 84th Fighter Regiments were transferred to the 16th Guards Fighter Aviation Regiment. Klubov and several of his colleagues were then assigned to the 1st squadron and underwent training under the supervision of Aleksandr Pokryshkin, one of the highest-scoring aces of the Soviet Union.

On 4 September 1943 Klubov was nominated for the title Hero of the Soviet Union for having completed 310 sorties, engaged in 84 dogfights, and personally shot down 14 enemy planes. He received the title on 13 April 1944.

Klubov was one shootdown away from becoming an "ace-in-a-day" on 30 May 1944, since he shot down two Ju 87 and two Fw 190. Earlier that month he was almost permanently grounded from flying after having gotten into a bad fight with a mechanic from another regiment, who ended up badly injured. He was detained and sent to be tried by a military tribunal, which likely would have resulted in him being sent to an infantry penal battalion with a high mortality rate, but Aleksandr Pokryshkin intervened and requested a more lenient sentence, insisting that losing a flying ace to a penal battalion would be result in many additional losses of Soviet aircraft.

Klubov died on 1 November 1944 after experiencing loss of control on a training flight of the new La-7 fighter. He was buried in the Hillov Glory in Lviv until his was reburied in the Vvedensky cemetery of Vologda in 2001. Throughout the war he scored 31 solo victories, gained three shared shootdowns, flew 457 sorties, and engaged in 109 aerial battles. After his death he was nominated for the title Hero of the Soviet Union again and awarded the title for a second time on 27 June 1945.

== Awards and honors ==
- Twice Hero of the Soviet Union (13 April 1944 and 27 June 1945)
- Order of Lenin (13 April 1944)
- Two Order of the Red Banner (19 October 1942 and 4 November 1943)
- Order of Aleksandr Nevsky (2 February 1944)
- Order of the Patriotic War 1st Class (2 May 1943)
