= Dan Perciun =

Moldovan politician (born 1991)

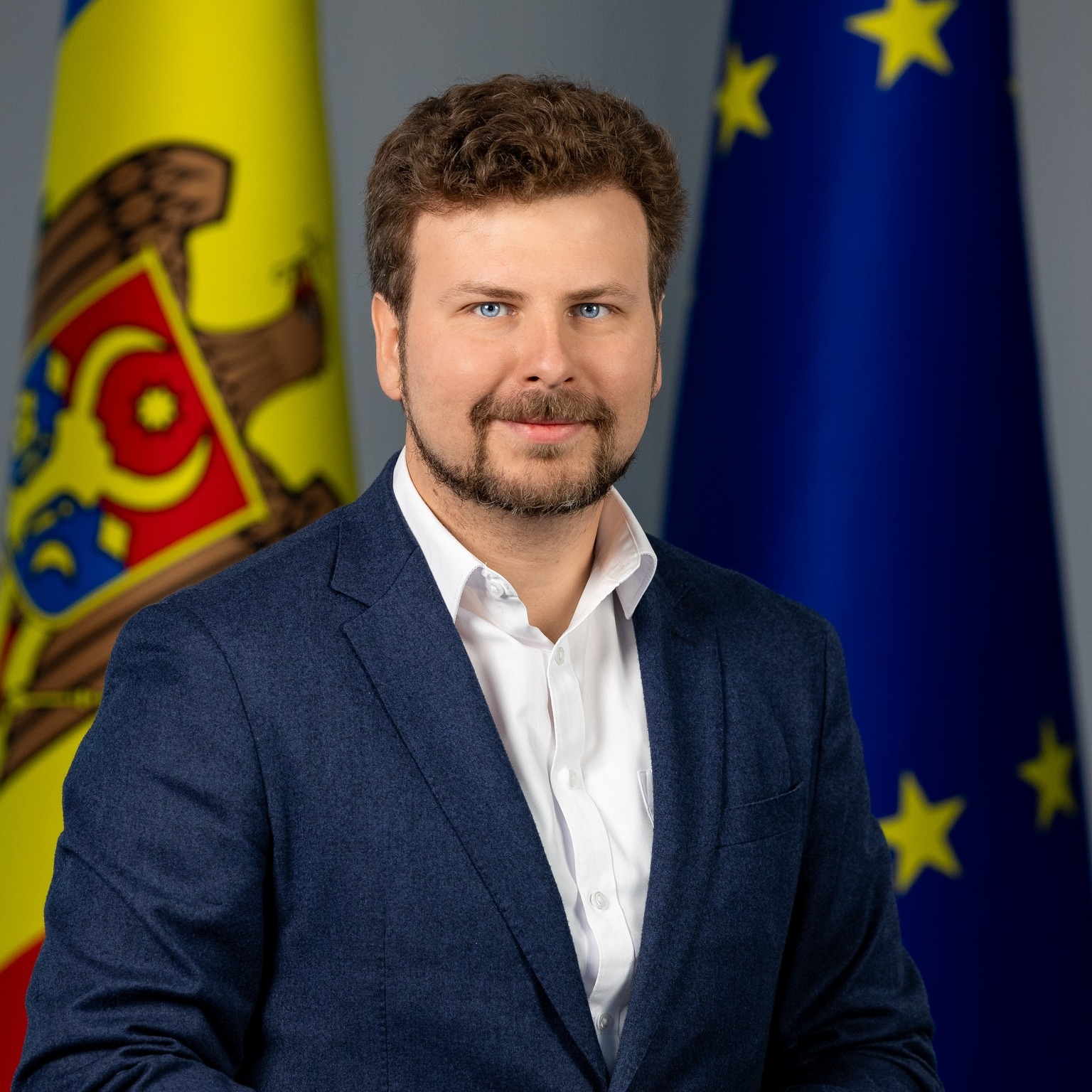
- Official portrait, 2025

Minister of Education and Research
- Incumbent
- Assumed office 17 July 2023
- President: Maia Sandu
- Prime Minister: Dorin Recean; Alexandru Munteanu; Eugen Osmochescu (acting); Vasile Tofan
- Preceded by: Anatolie Topală

Member of the Moldovan Parliament
- In office 22 October 2025 – 1 November 2025
- Succeeded by: Liliana Grosu
- Parliamentary group: Party of Action and Solidarity
- In office 9 March 2019 – 17 July 2023
- Succeeded by: Mariana Lucrețeanu
- Parliamentary group: Party of Action and Solidarity
- Constituency: Chișinău
- Majority: 11,576 (40.8%)

Personal details
- Born: 7 July 1991 (age 35) Chișinău, SSR Moldova, Soviet Union
- Education: University of Cambridge (BA); Babeș-Bolyai University (MA)

Dan Perciun (born 7 July 1991) is a Moldovan politician. He is the current Minister of Education and Research of Moldova.
