= 2001 Moldovan presidential election =

- 4 April 2001
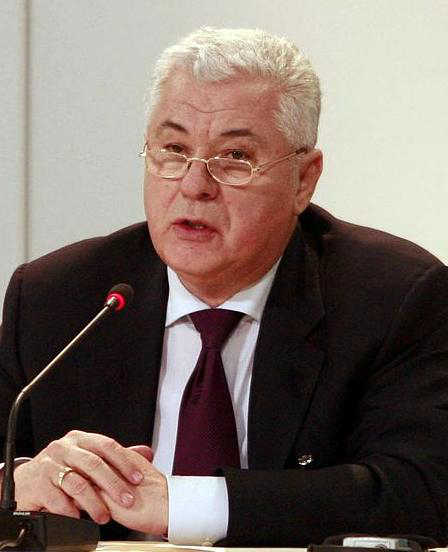

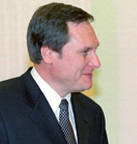
Nominee	Vladimir Voronin	Dumitru Braghiş
Party	PCRM	Braghiș Alliance
Electoral vote	71	15
President before election
Petru Lucinschi
Independent
Elected President
Vladimir Voronin
PCRM

An indirect presidential election was held in Moldova on 4 April 2001. The Party of Communists of the Republic of Moldova (PCRM) won 50.07% of the vote and 71 of the 101 seats in the February 2001 parliamentary election; by this time the constitution had been changed to provide for election of the President through the Parliament rather than popular vote. In March, the PCRM's Central Committee nominated Vladimir Voronin as its presidential candidate at a plenum, and on April 4, 2001 Voronin was elected as president by the Parliament. Of the 89 deputies participating in the vote, 71 voted for Voronin, 15 voted for Dumitru Braghiş, and three voted for Valerian Cristea. He was sworn in at a ceremony in Chişinău on April 7, 2001. The Constitutional Court ruled that the President could also lead a political party, and Voronin was re-elected as the PCRM's leader.

== Results ==
Candidate	Party	Votes	%
Vladimir Voronin	Party of Communists	71	79.78
Dumitru Braghiş	Braghiș Alliance	15	16.85
Valerian Cristea	Independent	3	3.37
Total		89	100.00
Valid votes		89	100.00
Invalid/blank votes		0	0.00
Total votes		89	100.00
Registered voters/turnout		101	88.12
Source: eDemocracy
