= Labour Party (Moldova) =

Political party in Moldova

The Labour Party (Romanian: Partidul Muncii, PM) is a minor political party in Moldova led by Gheorghe Sima.

== History ==
The party was established as the Labour Union (Uniunea Muncii) on 25 September 1999, and was registered on 12 November that year. In 2001, the party joined the Braghiş Alliance, an electoral alliance set up by Prime Minister Dumitru Braghiș to contest the 2001 parliamentary elections. The Alliance won 19 seats in the elections, emerging as the second-largest faction in Parliament behind the Party of Communists of the Republic of Moldova, which won 71 seats.

Prior to the 2005 parliamentary elections, the party was renamed Labour Union Party "Fatherland". It ran alone in the elections, but received only 0.9% of the vote and failed to win a seat. The party also failed to win a seat in the 2007 local elections, and did not contest the two parliamentary elections in 2009. The party returned to run in the 2010 parliamentary elections, but received just 875 votes (0.05%) and failed to win a seat. However, it did win six seats (0.06% of the total) in the 2011 local elections.
