= Victor Țvircun =

Moldovan politician (born 1955)

Victor Țvircun OR

Moldovan Ambassador to Qatar, Oman and Kuwait
- In office 24 December 2019 – 8 July 2022
- President: Igor Dodon; Maia Sandu
- Prime Minister: Ion Chicu; Aureliu Ciocoi (acting); Natalia Gavrilița
- Succeeded by: Iulian Grigoriță

Minister of Education, Youth and Sport
- In office 19 April 2005 – 31 March 2008
- President: Vladimir Voronin
- Prime Minister: Vasile Tarlev
- Preceded by: Valentin Beniuc
- Succeeded by: Larisa Șavga

Moldovan Ambassador to Turkey, Kuwait, United Arab Emirates, Qatar, Egypt, Oman, Libya and Saudi Arabia
- In office 28 September 2001 – 19 April 2005
- President: Vladimir Voronin
- Prime Minister: Vasile Tarlev
- Preceded by: Fiodor Angheli
- Succeeded by: Mihail Barbulat

Personal details
- Born: 18 October 1955 (age 70) Chișinău, Moldavian SSR, Soviet Union

Victor Țvircun (born 18 October 1955) is a Moldovan politician and diplomat. He served as the Minister of Education in the second Tarlev Cabinet (2005-2008).
