= Cîșlița-Prut =

- Village
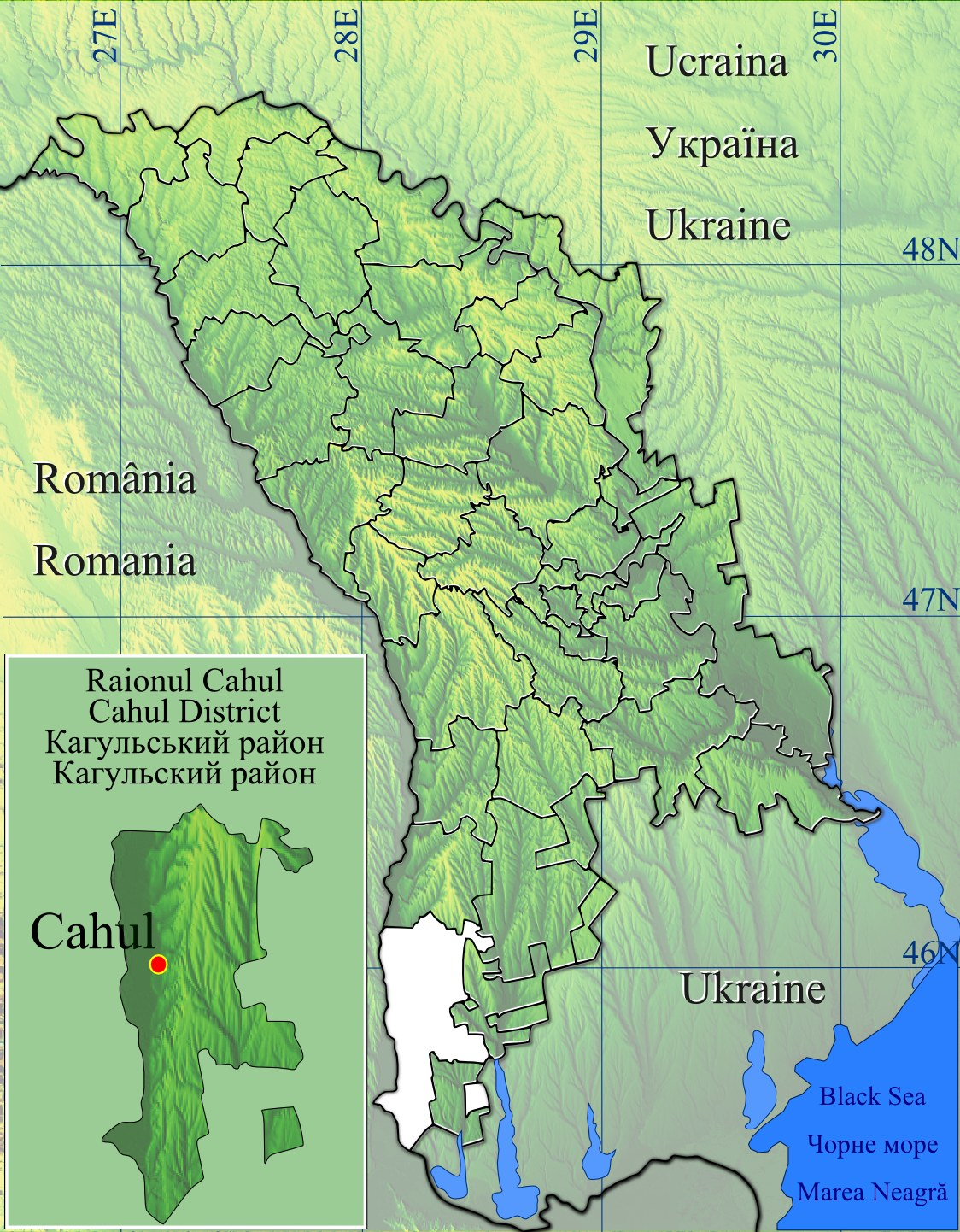
- Location of village within Moldova
- Coordinates: 45°32′N 28°10′E
- Country: Moldova
- District: Cahul District

Population (2014 census)
  - Total: 1,104
- Time zone: UTC+2 (EET)
  - Summer (DST): UTC+3 (EEST)

Cîșlița-Prut is a village in Cahul District, Moldova, located on the border with Romania, about 15 km (9.3 mi) to the north east of the city of Galați.

== Notable people ==
- Gheorghe Ion Marin
- Andrei Calcea
- Maria Sarabaș
- Dumitru Nidelcu
- Ilie Vancea
