= For a Democratic and Prosperous Moldova =

Political alliance

For a Democratic and Prosperous Moldova (Romanian: Pentru o Moldovă Democratică și Prosperă, PMDP) was a political alliance in Moldova led by Dumitru Diacov.

== History ==
The PMDP was formed around the For a Democratic and Prosperous Moldova Social-Political Movement to contest the 1998 elections, and also consisted of the Civic Party of Moldova, the Popular Democratic Party of Moldova and the New Force Movement. The alliance received 18% of the vote, winning 24 of the 101 seats and becoming the third-largest faction in Parliament. It formed the Alliance for Democracy and Reforms coalition together with Democratic Convention of Moldova and the Party of Democratic Forces, which was able to form a government led by Ion Ciubuc.

The alliance was dissolved prior to the 2001 elections, with the New Force Movement joining the Braghiş Alliance.
