= Mihail Șleahtițchi =

Moldovan politician (born 1956)

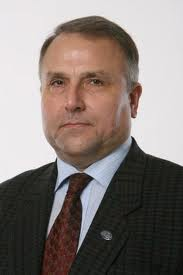
- Șleahtițchi in 2013

Culture, Education and Science Advisor to the President
- In office 24 July 2012 – 22 December 2016
- President: Nicolae Timofti
- Preceded by: Vitalie Cărăuș
- Succeeded by: Corneliu Popovici

Minister of Education
- In office 14 January 2011 – 24 July 2012
- President: Marian Lupu (acting); Nicolae Timofti
- Prime Minister: Vladimir Filat
- Preceded by: Leonid Bujor
- Succeeded by: Maia Sandu

Member of the Moldovan Parliament
- In office 22 April 2009 – 11 February 2011
- Succeeded by: Iurie Chiorescu
- Parliamentary group: Liberal Democratic Party

Personal details
- Born: 17 March 1956 (age 70) Tîrnova, Moldavian SSR, Soviet Union
- Party: Liberal Democratic Party of Moldova
- Spouse: Maria Șleahtițchi
- Education: Doktor nauk Pedagogical Sc., Moscow State Pedagogical University; Dr Psychology, Alexandru Ioan Cuza University
- Alma mater: Alecu Russo State University of Bălți
- Occupation: Politician
- Profession: Professor

Mihail Șleahtițchi (born 17 March 1956) is a pedagogue, psychologist, university professor and politician from the Republic of Moldova. Former MP, Secretary and Chairman of the Parliamentary Commission for Culture, Education, Research, Youth, Sports and Mass Media (2009 - 2011), Former Minister of Education of the Republic of Moldova (2011 - 2012), Former Advisor to the President of the Republic of Moldova the fields of culture, education and science (2012-2016).

He has been a member of the Parliament of Moldova since 2009.

He is married to Maria Șleahtițchi.
