= Gheorghe Sima =

Moldovan politician (born 1952)

Minister of Education
- In office 26 February 2002 – 2 July 2003
- President: Vladimir Voronin
- Prime Minister: Vasile Tarlev
- Preceded by: Ilie Vancea
- Succeeded by: Valentin Beniuc

Member of the Moldovan Parliament
- In office 20 March 2001 – 26 February 2002
- Succeeded by: Nicolae Diatovschi
- Parliamentary group: Braghiș Alliance

Personal details
- Born: 1952 (age 73–74) Sărățica Nouă, Moldavian SSR, Soviet Union
- Party: Labour Party (Moldova)
- Other political affiliations: Social Democratic Party
- Education: Moldova State University

Gheorghe Sima (born 1952) is a Moldovan politician. He served as the Minister of Education (26 February 2002 - 2 July 2003).

In 1998, Gheorghe Sima and his group left the Social Democratic Party. On September 25, 1999, he formed the Labour Party (Moldova).
