= Grigory Rechkalov =

Soviet World War II flying ace

Grigory Andreevich Rechkalov
- Григорий Андреевич Речкалов
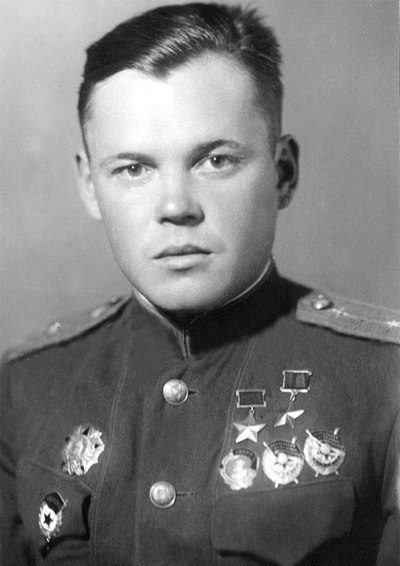
- Born: 9 February 1920 village Khudyakovo (now Zajkovo), Irbitskiy district of Sverdlovsk region
- Died: 20 December 1990 (aged 70); Moscow, Soviet Union
- Spouse: Anfisa Yakovlevna Rechkalova
- Military career
- Allegiance: Soviet Union
- Branch: Soviet Air Force
- Service years: 1938 – 1959
- Rank: Major General
- Unit: 16th Guards Fighter Aviation Regiment
- Conflicts: World War II
- Awards: Hero of the Soviet Union (twice)

Grigory Andreevich Rechkalov (Russian: Григо́рий Андре́евич Речка́лов; 9 February 1920 – 20 December 1990) was a Soviet fighter pilot during World War II who scored over fifty solo shootdowns, making him one of the highest scoring Soviet fighter pilots. He was twice awarded the title Hero of the Soviet Union for his aerial victories and went on to become a general after the war.

== Early life ==
Rechkalov was born on 9 February 1920 in Khudyakovo into a Russian peasant family. (Note: He was born in 1920, but to fast-track his acceptance into the military he exaggerated his age, claiming to be born in 1918.) After graduation from school, he joined the Army in 1938, and in 1939 graduated from Perm Military Aviation Pilot School. He was initially grounded because of Daltonism, but due to the start of the war he was allowed to fly in 1941 and posted to the 55th Fighter Aviation Regiment, stationed in the Odessa Military District.

== World War II ==
He began his combat career on 22 June 1941 over Moldavia flying an I-153 marked "blue 13" on the tail, undertaking 30 sorties in this aircraft during the month and engaging in ten combats. On 27 June, Rechkalov attacked and brought down an Hs.126 east of Boksha, near Sculeni, for his first claim. On 11 July he claimed a Ju 88 near Kotovsk. On 26 July 1941 near Dubasari, he was wounded in the right leg by anti-aircraft fire. He returned safely to his airfield and after landing was hospitalized. Due to the severity of the wound he had was forced to stay with a reserve aviation unit for several months after the three surgeries. He returned to his previous in Spring 1942. Earlier, the unit has been honored with the guards designation and renamed 16 Guards Fighter Aviation Regiment for outstanding service.

By the end of 1942, Rechkalov had claimed 4 and 2 shared victories. At that time, the 16th Regiment was re-equipped with new P-39 Airacobras and temporarily posted to the reserve for training. In the spring of 1943, they were posted to the North Caucasus Front and the Kuban River. On 24 May 1943, he was awarded the title Hero of the Soviet Union for 12 solo and 2 shared shootdowns throughout 194 sorties.

In May 1944 Rechkalov took command over the 16th Guards Fighter Aviation Regiment, but on 31 May 1944, while leading a formation over Iași, five P-39s were lost after he decided to pursue a group of Bf 109 fighters alone. According to official accounts, Rechkalov was disciplined by his superiors for pursuing the enemy alone rather than offering leadership to his less experienced squadron. Upon the recommendation of his commanding officer Aleksandr Pokryshkin, Rechkalov was replaced by Boris Glinka of the 100th Guards Fighter Aviation Regiment as commander of the 16th Guards Fighter Aviation Regiment for (according to Pokryshkin) "losing control, indecisiveness and lack of initiative". Throughout the war Pokryshkin clashed with Rechkalov over his lack of discipline.

On 15 July 1944, Glinka was seriously wounded when he bailed out of his badly damaged P-39 and struck the tailplane. Rechkalov again took over as regiment commander, but left command of it in February 1945 and was appointed Inspector for Flight Training of 9th Guards Fighter Aviation Division.

By the end of the war he had flown 452 sorties and engaged in 122 dogfights; operational documents credit him with 56 solo and 6 shared kills, while certification documents credit him with 61 solo and 4 shared. He flew the I-153, I-16, MiG-3, Yak-1, and P-39, but a vast majority of his tally was on the P-39. His award nomination did not mention his three victories from 1941, although there have been allegations that Pokryshkin tried to steal some of Rechkalov's kills.

== Postwar ==
In 1951 he graduated from the Air Force Academy in Monino. He then commanded a regiment, and various air divisions. In 1957 he was deputy commander of the fighter aircraft separate Far Eastern Air Defense Army. Rechkalov went on to become a Major General of Aviation in the Soviet Air Force in 1957 before leaving the military in 1959. He wrote two books about his wartime experiences: Дымное небо войны (English: The Smoking Skies of War) and В Небе Молдавии (English: In Moldavian Skies). Rechkalov lived in Moscow until his death on 20 December 1990.

== Aerial victory claims ==
Claim	Date	Type
1	26 June 1941	Bf 109
2	27 June 1941	Hs 126
3	11 July 1941	Ju 88
4	25 May 1942	Bf 110
5	27 May 1942	Bf 110
6	9 July 1942	Bf 109
7	10 July 1942	Bf 109
8	10 July 1942	Bf 109
9	11 April 1943	Ju 88
10	12 April 1943	Bf 109
11	15 April 1943	Bf 109
12	16 April 1943	Bf 109
13	17 April 1943	Bf 109
14	21 April 1943	Bf 109
15	21 April 1943	Bf 109
16	29 April 1943	Bf 109
17	4 May 1943	Bf 109
18	4 May 1943	Bf 109
19	5 May 1943	Bf 109
20	6 May 1943	Bf 109
21	8 May 1943	Bf 109
22	8 May 1943	Ju 87
23	14 May 1943	Bf 109
24	28 May 1943	Bf 109
25	16 August 1943	Bf 109
26	17 August 1943	Bf 109
27	26 August 1943	Ju 88
28	29 August 1943	Bf 109
29	29 August 1943	Bf 109
30	30 August 1943	Ju 87
31	2 September 1943	Bf 109
32	19 September 1943	He 111
33	26 September 1943	Bf 109
34	1 October 1943	Ju 87
35	1 October 1943	Ju 87
36	1 October 1943	Ju 87
37	16 October 1943	Ju 88
38	24 October 1943	Bf 109
39	24 October 1943	Bf 109
40	26 October 1943	Ju 88
41	1 November 1943	Ju 87
42	1 November 1943	Ju 87
43	1 November 1943	Ju 87
44	1 December 1943	Ju 87
45	8 December 1943	Ju 52
46	12 December 1943	Ju 52
47	29 December 1943	He 111
48	29 December 1943	Fi 156
49	30 May 1944	Bf 109
50	31 May 1944	Fw 190
51	31 May 1944	Fi 156
52	3 June 1944	Ju 87
53	3 June 1944	Bf 109
54	16 July 1944	Ju 87
55	22 July 1944	Fw 190
56	2 August 1944	Fw 190
57	31 August 1944	Bf 109
58	24 October 1944	Ju 52
59	26 January 1945	Bf 109
60	20 February 1945	Fw 190
61	20 February 1945	Fw 190

== Awards and honors ==
- Twice Hero of the Soviet Union (24 May 1943 and 1 July 1944)
- Order of Lenin (24 May 1943)
- Four Order of the Red Banner (30 December 1942, 5 May 1943, 22 October 1944, and 14 August 1957)
- Order of Alexander Nevsky (2 October 1943)
- Two Order of the Red Star (26 October 1955 and 14 May 1956)
- campaign and jubilee medals
