= Liliana Nicolaescu-Onofrei =

Moldovan politician (born 1968)

Liliana Nicolaescu-Onofrei MP
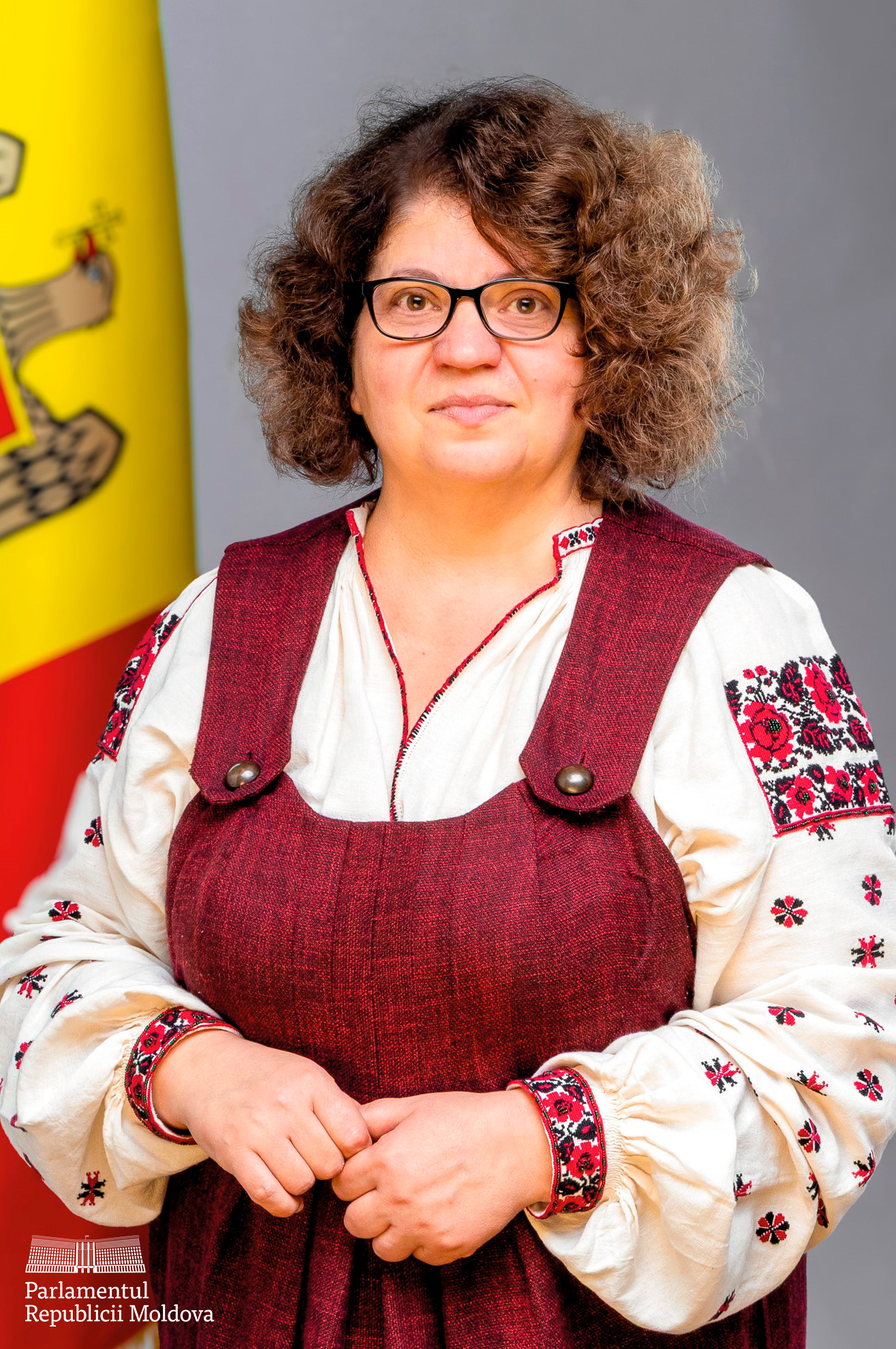
- Official portrait, 2025

Member of the Moldovan Parliament
- Incumbent
- Assumed office 23 July 2021
- Parliamentary group: Party of Action and Solidarity
- In office 9 March 2019 – 26 July 2019
- Succeeded by: Serghei Cataranciuc
- Parliamentary group: Party of Action and Solidarity

Education and Research Advisor to the President
- In office 24 December 2020 – 9 August 2021
- President: Maia Sandu
- Preceded by: Corneliu Popovici
- Succeeded by: Valentina Chicu

Minister of Education, Culture and Research
- In office 8 June 2019 – 14 November 2019
- President: Igor Dodon
- Prime Minister: Maia Sandu
- Preceded by: Monica Babuc
- Succeeded by: Corneliu Popovici

Deputy Minister of Education
- In office 10 July 2013 – 19 August 2015
- President: Nicolae Timofti
- Prime Minister: Iurie Leancă; Chiril Gaburici; Natalia Gherman (acting); Valeriu Streleț
- Minister: Maia Sandu; Corina Fusu
- Succeeded by: Nadejda Cristea

Personal details
- Born: 6 November 1968 (age 57) Lozova, Moldavian SSR, Soviet Union
- Education: Moldova State University

Liliana Nicolaescu-Onofrei (born 6 November 1968) is a Moldovan politician. She served as Minister of Education, Culture and Research from 8 June 2019 to 14 November 2019 in the cabinet of Prime Minister Maia Sandu.

Political offices
Preceded by Monica Babuc	Minister of Education, Culture and Research; 2019	Succeeded by Corneliu Popovici
