= Valentin Beniuc =

Moldovan historian (born 1956)

Minister of Education
- In office 5 August 2003 – 19 April 2005
- President: Vladimir Voronin
- Prime Minister: Vasile Tarlev
- Preceded by: Gheorghe Sima
- Succeeded by: Victor Țvircun

Personal details
- Born: 8 January 1956 (age 70) Moldavian SSR, Soviet Union

Valentin Beniuc (born 8 January 1956) is a Moldovan historian. He held the officer of Minister of Education of Moldova from 2003 to 2005.
