= Alexander Pokryshkin =

Soviet fighter ace of the Second World War (1913–1985)

- Александр Иванович Покрышкин
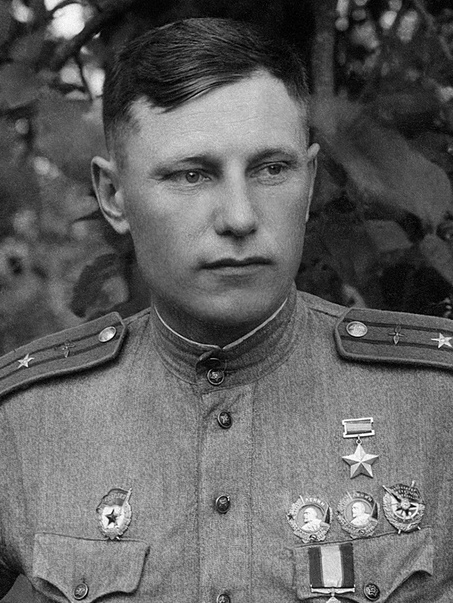
- Pokryshkin in 1943
- Born: 6 March [O.S. 21 February] 1913; Novonikolayevsk, Tomsk Governorate, Russian Empire
- Died: 13 November 1985 (aged 72); Moscow, Russian SFSR, Soviet Union
- Burial place: Novodevichy Cemetery
- Spouse: Mariya Kuzminichna
- Military career
- Allegiance: Soviet Union
- Branch: Soviet Air Force
- Service years: 1932–1985
- Rank: Marshal of Aviation
- Unit: 16th Guards Fighter Aviation Regiment
- Conflicts: World War II
- Awards: Hero of the Soviet Union (thrice); US Army Distinguished Service Medal

Signature
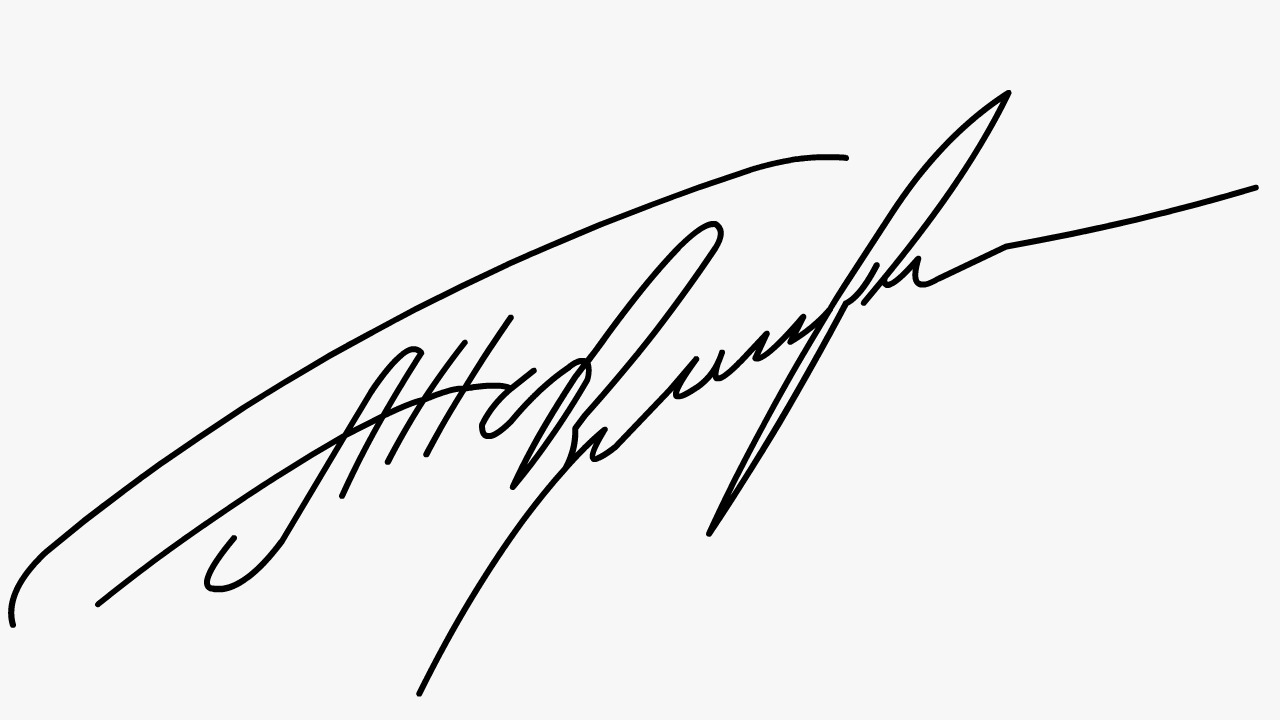

Alexander Ivanovich Pokryshkin (Russian: Александр Иванович Покрышкин; 6 March [O.S. 21 February] 1913 – 13 November 1985) was a Soviet fighter pilot in World War II, and later a marshal of aviation. He was one of the highest-scoring Soviet aces, and the highest-scoring pilot ever to fly an American aircraft, having achieved the great majority of his kills in the Lend-Lease Bell P-39 Airacobra. During the war Pokryshkin earned the title Hero of the Soviet Union three times: 24 May 1943, 24 August 1943, and 19 August 1944. After the war, he served in the Soviet Air Defense Forces, reaching the rank of Marshal of Aviation; he retired in 1981.

During the war, he strongly promoted training in and use of improved aerial combat techniques, such as vertical maneuvers that newer fighter aircraft were capable of carrying out, and he spent much of his time studying aerobatics for combat situations.

== Early years ==
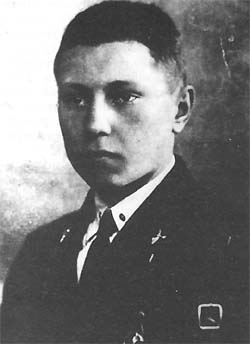
Vocational school student Pokryshkin c. 1930.

Pokryshkin was born in Novonikolayevsk (now Novosibirsk) in Tomsk Governorate, son of a Russian peasant-turned-factory worker. He grew up in a poor, crime-ridden part of town, but unlike most of his peers he was more interested in learning than in fighting and petty crime. His nickname in his early teens was Engineer. He caught the "aviation bug" when he was 12 years old at a local air show, and the dream never left him. In 1928, after seven years of school, he found work as a construction worker. In 1930, despite his father's protests, he left home and entered a local technical college, where he received a degree in 18 months and worked for six more as a steel worker at a local munitions factory. Subsequently, he volunteered for the army and was sent to an aviation school. His dream finally seemed to be coming true. Unfortunately the flight school was suddenly closed, and all students were instead transferred to be trained as aircraft mechanics. Dozens of official requests were denied with a simple explanation: "Soviet aviation needs mechanics just as badly".

Pokryshkin still strived to excel as a mechanic. Graduating in 1933, he quickly rose through the ranks. By December 1934, he became the Senior Aviation Mechanic of the 74th Rifle Division. He stayed in that capacity until November 1938. During that time his creative nature became clearly visible: he invented improvements to the ShKAS machine gun and the R-5 reconnaissance aircraft among other things.

Finally, during his vacation in the winter of 1938, Pokryshkin was able to circumvent the authorities by passing a yearly civilian pilot program in only 17 days. This automatically made him eligible for flight school. Without even packing a suitcase, he boarded a train to flight school. He graduated with top honors in 1939, and with the rank of senior lieutenant he was assigned to the 55th Fighter Regiment.

== World War II ==
=== Early experiences ===
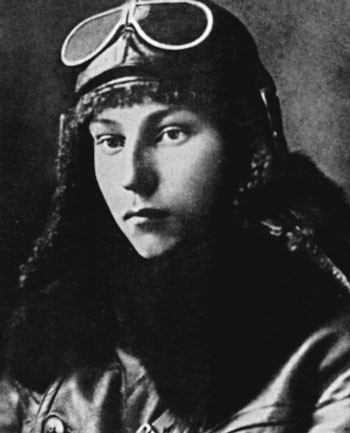
Pokryshkin in 1940.

He was stationed in the Moldavian Soviet Socialist Republic in June 1941, close to the border, and his airfield was bombed on 22 June, the first day of the war.

His first involvement in air combat was a disaster. Seeing an aircraft in the air of a type he had never seen before, he attacked and shot it down, only to notice as it was going down that it had Soviet red stars on the wings. It was a Soviet Su-2 light bomber of the 211th Bomber Aviation Regiment, piloted by squadron commander Mikhail Gudzenko. This was a new bomber type that was kept secret even from other Soviet pilots. He then frantically flew in front of all the other MiG-3 pilots who were lining up on the other Sukhoi bombers, thwarting any other Soviet losses by other pilots of his unit. Gudzenko survived, although the navigator was killed.

He claimed his first shootdown of an enemy aircraft when he shot down a Bf 109 the next day, while he and his wingman were on a reconnaissance mission, and were jumped by five enemy fighters. On 3 July, having claimed several more victories, he was shot down by German flak behind enemy lines and spent four days getting back to his unit. During the first weeks of the war, Pokryshkin began to see very clearly how outdated the Soviet combat doctrine was, and started slowly drafting his own ideas in his meticulous notebooks. He carefully recorded all details of all air engagements in which he and all his friends were involved, and came up with detailed analysis of each. He fought in very complicated conditions: constant retreat, poor- to no-controlling and communication from HQ, and overwhelming odds versus a superior opponent. He later said "one who hasn't fought in 1941–1942 has not truly tasted war".

Pokryshkin survived several close calls during this time. A machine gun round drove through the right side of the cockpit, cut his shoulder straps, ricocheted off the left side and scratched his chin, covering the entire windscreen in blood. Twice, unexploded bombs landed between his feet, one time during a dramatic low-level raid on his airfield by a pair of Ju 88s. Pokryshkin tried to defend his fighter, one of the very few remaining serviceable aircraft, by removing a flexible machine gun from the nearby bomber and placing it on top of his fighter's fuselage. One of the German bombers saw Pokryshkin firing the only machine gun in the area and flew straight at him, dropping small bombs in a shallow dive. Pokryshkin watched a string of explosions running up to him, but the bomb that landed immediately next to him did not explode. The Ju 88 had dropped it too low; the bomb had insufficient time to arm itself before hitting the ground.

In the autumn of 1941 Pokryshkin, flying a MiG-3 (possibly winter-camouflaged), took off in sleet and rain conditions after two other pilots had crashed on takeoff. His mission was to locate von Kleist's 1st Panzer Group, which had been stopped in front of Shakhty, and then their position lost by the Soviet forces. After some time flying at low altitude, low on gasoline, in bad weather, he finally found them, and was able to return safely to base with this critical information. For the successful completion of this mission, he was awarded the Order of Lenin.

When the German summer offensive of 1942 began, part of 16th Guards Fighter Aviation Regiment had been re-equipped with the Yakovlev Yak-1 fighter, including Pokryshkin's squadron. In that period Pokryshkin flew missions escorting Su-2 and Il-2 Shturmovik aircraft, and frequently was engaged by German fighters. On 17 July 1942, during a dogfight with Bf 109s, he became separated from his wingman Konstantin Figichov, and was jumped by a Rotte of Bf 109G-2 "Gustavs" flown by the experte Feldwebel Hans Dammers and his wingman Unteroffizier Kurt Keiser (7./JG 52). Initially Pokryshkin dove to escape, but realizing that the heavier and faster Gustavs would catch him, he performed a chandelle and then a barrel roll. This caused the Germans to overshoot, and then Pokryshkin shot down (and killed) Keiser at short range. Dammers attacked Pokryshkin shortly afterwards, damaging his Yak-1. But once more Pokryshkin performed a barrel roll, forced Dammers to slide forward, and then shot down the German ace.

In the late summer of 1942, his regiment was recalled from the front lines to convert to a new fighter type, the Bell P-39 Airacobra. While training in the rear, Pokryshkin frequently clashed with the regiment's new commander, Isayev (the former regimental navigator), who could not stand his criticism of Soviet air combat doctrine. Isayev fabricated a court-martial case, accusing Pokryshkin of cowardice, insubordination, and disobeying orders. Pokryshkin was grounded, removed from the regiment's headquarters, and had his Party membership cancelled. However, he was helped by his squadron mates, the regimental political commissar, and the divisional commanders, and he was soon vindicated. The 216 Fighter Aviation Division's leadership dismissed the case against him, and had him reinstated.

=== Kuban ===
Pokryshkin's most significant contribution to the war effort and the most impressive kill record came during the battle for the Kuban region in 1943. The area east of the Crimean peninsula had seen vicious air combat in the months that led to the Soviet assault on Crimea itself, where the Kuban-based Soviet air regiments flew against Crimea-based Luftwaffe Geschwader. Pokryshkin's regiment fought against such renowned German fighter units as JG 52 and JG 3 'Udet'. The area saw some of the most fierce fighting on the Eastern Front, with daily engagements of up to 200 aircraft in the air. Pokryshkin's innovative tactics of using different fighter types stacked in altitude, the so-called 'pendulum' flight pattern for patrolling the airspace, and the use of ground-based radar, forward based controllers, and an advanced central ground control system, contributed to the first great Soviet Air Force victory over the Luftwaffe.

In the summer of 1942, the 4th Air Army in which Pokryshkin served received their first mobile radar stations. They were tested in directing interceptions of German and Romanian aircraft over water, and they proved highly successful.

In early January 1943, 16th Guards Fighter Aviation Regiment was sent to 25th Depot Fighter Aviation Regiment, a unit tasked with checking that Soviet-made and Lend-Lease aircraft were ready for combat service near the Iranian border, to re-equip with new aircraft, and also to receive new pilots. Many of these planes had to be ferried in from Iran. Whilst there were delays in assembly by the Americans in Iran, the Soviet pilots involved felt that the Americans were willfully impeding the war effort. It was at this time that the unit converted to the P-39 Airacobra which, when all had arrived, transformed the unit into a 3-squadron regiment. 16th Guards Fighter Aviation Regiment received 14 P-39L-1s, seven P-39Ks (the very last of which was assigned to Pokryshkin) and 11 P-39D-2s. The unit returned to action on 8 April 1943. During the remainder of the month, Pokryshkin was credited with 11 Bf 109s and one Ju 88 destroyed.

He was credited with a Bf 109 destroyed on his very first Airacobra mission, on 9 April 1943, and scored four Bf 109 kills on 12 April 1943, one of his more successful days. He scored again on 15, 16, 20, 21, and 24 April – one Bf 109 on each day, adding a Ju 88 (probably in fact an He 111) on 29 April, plus one more Bf 109 on 30 April.

On 4 May 1943 Pokryshkin gained three confirmed kills – two Ju 87 and a Bf 109.

In most subsequent fights, Pokryshkin would usually take the most difficult role, attacking the German flight leader, who was often an aggressive experte. He had learned in 1941–42 that shooting down the flight leader would demoralise the enemy and often cause them to scramble home. Taking that into account, several such experten were almost certainly among his kills during the month of May that year. On 6 May 1943 Pokryshkin shot down a Bf 109, probably the plane of 9-kills ace Unteroffizier Heinz Scholze (4./JG 52), who crashed while trying to land at Kuteinikovo. Two days later, his victim may have been the Bf 109G-4 of Leutnant Helmut Haberda (an experte of 5./JG 52 with 58 victories to his credit), though the Luftwaffe credited the loss to Soviet flak.

Pokryshkin received his first 'Hero of the Soviet Union' award on 24 May 1943, and was promoted to major in June, having become commanding officer of his squadron. On 23 June, he exchanged his old P-39K-1 USAAF Serial Number 42-4421, "White 13", for the famous P-39N USAAF S.N. 42-9004, "White 100". He flew aircraft designated 100 for the rest of the war, such as P-39N-5 42-19185, after 42-9004 was damaged in August or September 1943, except for the test of the Berlin autobahn as a runway in Konstantin Sukhov's "White 50", which was much photographed.

=== The Campaign in Ukraine ===
In mid-July the 216 Fighter Aviation Division (then redesignated 9 Guards Fighter Aviation Division) was deployed in southern Ukraine to help take the Donbass area. There he continued to defeat German aces – on 23 July 1943 Pokryshkin shot down the 56-kills experte Uffz. Hans Ellendt, of 4./JG 52.

Occasionally his P-39s also escorted the Pe-2 bombers. In that role, he used his nickname Sotka ("One Hundred") – his radio call sign), because he knew very well that the Luftwaffe ordered its airmen to stay on the ground if they knew he was in the air. A Pe-2 pilot of the 36 Bomber Aviation Regiment, Timofey P. Puniov, recalled that because of the heavy casualties inflicted by the German fighters, the 16th Guards Fighter Aviation Regiment was tasked to escort them. Puniov clearly remembers that twice Pokryshkin violated radio silence saying openly in the frequency: "Vnimanie! Ya – sotka. Poedu na rabotu!" (Attention! I'm "100". I'm going to work!). Neither on those two occasions nor after did the German fighters try to intercept the 36th Bomber Aviation Regiment.

On 20 August, Isaev, who had been the Unit Navigator, and then Commanding Officer, and with whom Pokryshkin had strong differences, took measures to have Pokryshkin stripped of his Hero of the Soviet Union, expelled from the regiment, and hauled before a tribunal. From 10 PM that night at least through the following day, Pokryshkin, 298th Fighter Aviation Regiment's Major Taranyenko, and the 16th Guards' Commissar, Gubarevim, and some "Osobists" (NKVD people) completed interrogations and investigations. Gubarevim, with difficulty, was able to clear Pokryshkin's name and reputation, and "Sasha" was thereupon awarded his second Hero of the Soviet Union on 24 August 1943.

On 21 September 1943, Pokryshkin was involved in another high-profile air engagement. This one happened at low altitudes right over the front line. It was witnessed by dozens of journalists and representatives of the high command. Pokryshkin shot down three Junkers Ju 88s in a single pass, overcome by hatred, as he had just found out that the entire family of Zhmud, his mechanic, had been killed in German-occupied territories. Only two kills were confirmed, the third Ju 88 being recorded as brought down by the explosion of the second one and not because of Pokryshkin's gunfire. All three Junkers are confirmed by German loss records – they were Ju 88A-4s of 5./RummKGr. Earlier that same day Pokryshkin had added two more Junkers Ju 87s to his tally, almost certainly Ju 87D-5s of 6./StG 1.

=== 1944–1945 ===
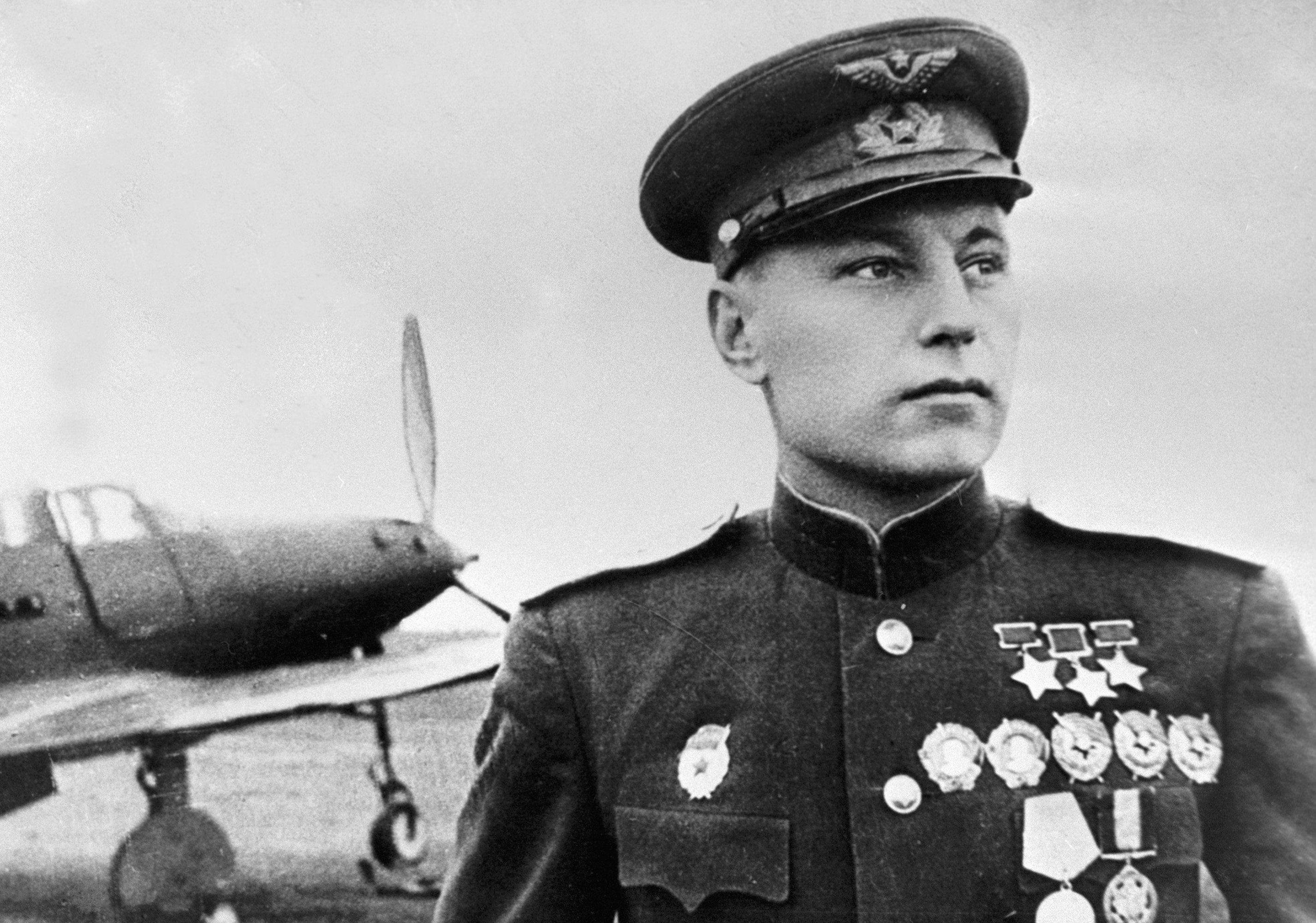
Pokryshkin in early 1945

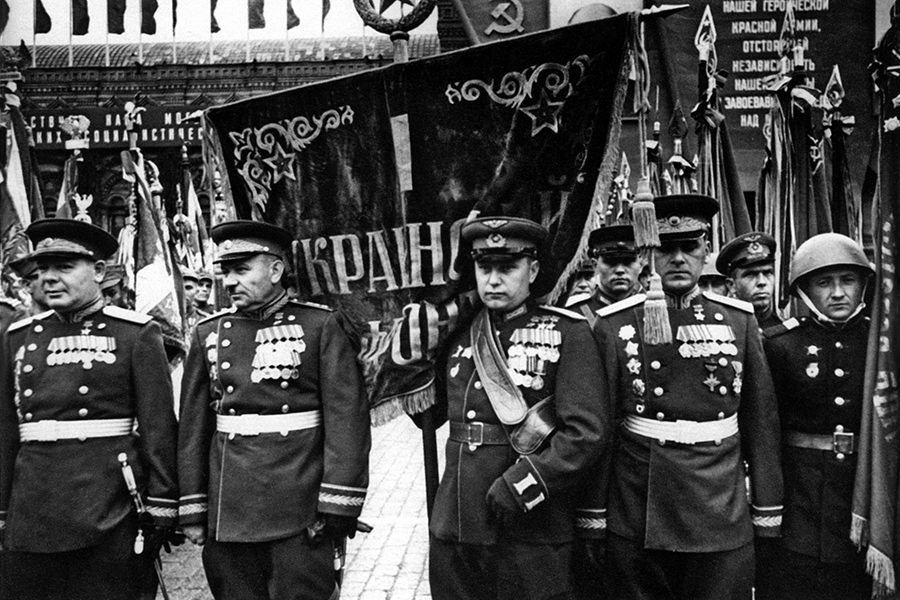
Aleksandr Pokryshkin (center) carrying the standard of the 1st Ukrainian Front. 1945 Moscow Victory Parade

In February 1944, Pokryshkin was offered a promotion and an easy desk job managing new pilot training. He immediately rejected this offer, and stayed at his old regiment and his old rank. However, he did not fly nearly as much as before. Pokryshkin had been made a famous hero by the propaganda machine, and he was not allowed to fly as often because of fear of him being killed. Instead, Pokryshkin spent a lot of time in the radio bunker, directing his regiment's fights over the radio. In June 1944, Pokryshkin was promoted to colonel and given command of 9th Guards Air Division.

On 19 August 1944, for 550 front-line sorties and 53 official kills, Pokryshkin was awarded the Gold Star of the Hero of the Soviet Union for the third time. He was the first person to receive the award three times, and he is the only Soviet soldier to receive the award three times during wartime. Pokryshkin was forbidden to fly altogether, but managed to circumvent the rule a few times and still continued to score an occasional kill.

One of such occasions occurred on 30 May 1944 near Jassy, Romania. The whole 16th Guards Fighter Aviation Regiment engaged a large formation of Ju 87s heading towards the Soviet ground forces escorted by Fw 190s and Bf 109s. In the ensuing melée, the Airacobra pilots claimed to shoot down five Stukas, three Focke-Wulfs and one Messerschmitt without losses – three Ju 87s were shot down by Pokryshkin himself. At some point during May 1944, Pokryshkin met with Mikhail Devyataev, who later became famous for his escape with nine other Soviet POWs from a Nazi concentration camp in Peenemünde, Usedom. The next time Pokryshkin scored victories was on 16 July, when he got credit for two more Stukas and one Hs 129 of 10.(Pz)/SG 9, probably the Henschel Hs 129B-2 of Hauptmann Rudolf-Heinz Ruffer, credited with 80 tank-kills. His last victory was another Ju 87, downed on 14 January 1945.

Out of his official score of 65 victories, only six were scored in the last two years of the war. The bulk of Pokryshkin's victories came during the time when the Soviet Air Force was still fighting at a disadvantage, and he was among the most successful Soviet pilots during the most difficult first year of the war.

In the Victory Parade, Pokryshkin participated as the standard bearer of the 1st Ukrainian Front.

== After the war ==
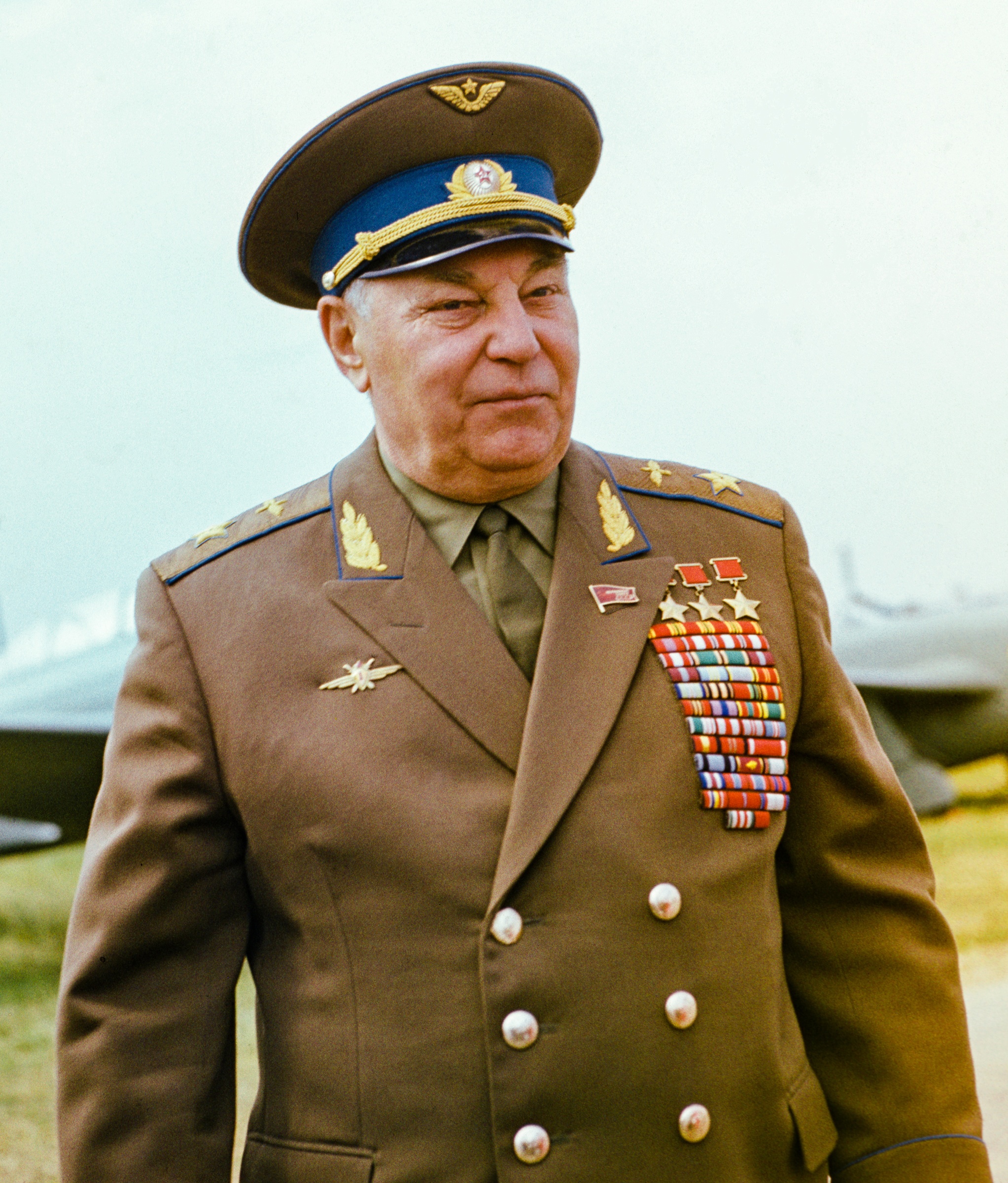
Marshal of Aviation Alexander Pokryshkin, 1978, author: Leo Medvedev

In 1948 he graduated from the Frunze Military Academy. in 1949–1955 he acted as deputy commander of the 33rd Fighter Air Defense Corps and commander of the 88th Fighter Aviation Corps in Rzhev. He was repeatedly passed-over for promotion, possibly because he was just too intelligent (or honest) for Stalin's comfort. Only after Stalin's death did he find himself back in favor and finally promoted to Marshal of Aviation.

In 1957 he graduated from the General Staff Academy. After graduation he served as Chief of Fighter Aircraft of the North Caucasian Military Defense. From 1959, he served in the 8th Independent Air Defense Army Air (Kiev), and from 1961 to 1968 acted as Commanding General of the 8th Army Air Defense and deputy commander of the Kiev Military District Air Defense Forces. In 1968 he became Deputy Chief of the Air Defense Forces.

His highest position was as president of DOSAAF (1972–1981), a mostly civilian organization that was largely tasked with training young civilians and preparing them for service with the Air Force. Pokryshkin again found himself ostracized for his honesty. Despite strong pressure, he never wrote about or supported glorification of Soviet leader Leonid Brezhnev's role in the battle of Kuban, where Brezhnev was a minor general. Pokryshkin died on 13 November 1985 at the age of 72, and was buried at Novodevichy Cemetery. In Novosibirsk, a street, a square, and a subway station are named in his honor.

He wrote several books in Russian about his wartime experiences. He appeared in the documentary TV Series The Unknown War, in episode 9, entitled "War in the Air", and, at the beginning and end of the episode, he spoke to the host and narrator, Burt Lancaster.

There are two Soviet-made documentaries about Alexander Pokryshkin: Pokryshkin in the Sky (1945), and Russian Ace Alexander Pokryshkin (1985).

== Aircraft flown by Pokryshkin ==
Pokryshkin started the war flying the Mikoyan-Gurevich MiG-3 fighter, in which he scored almost twenty victories. The unit was given the honor "16th Guards Fighter Regiment" in March 1942. At this time or soon after, the unit received some Yak-1s, in which Pokryshkin also scored victories, but which are neither identified, nor illustrated, in any known way. In January 1943, his regiment converted to Lend-Lease Bell P-39 Airacobras. Soviet pilots liked this aircraft, and found it quite competitive with the Messerschmitt Bf 109 and superior to the Focke-Wulf Fw 190 at the low air combat altitudes common on the Eastern Front. Pokryshkin enjoyed the 37 mm cannon's destructive firepower, as well as the two upper nose-mounted .50 caliber machine guns, synchronized to fire through the propeller (airscrew), in addition to the pair of .30 caliber machine guns mounted in each wing. He claimed that the cannon's trigger, positioned at the top of the joystick, was impossible to push without moving the pilot's hand, which made the aircraft deviate from the gunsight, so finally he had his regiment's aircraft rigged so that a single button simultaneously fired cannon and machine guns. In his memoirs he describes many enemy aircraft immediately disintegrating upon being hit by a salvo. Pokryshkin and his regiment were repeatedly asked to convert to new Soviet fighters such as the La-5 and Yak-3. However, Pokryshkin found the Yak-3's firepower insufficient, and personally disliked Yakovlev, so the squadron remained with the P-39.

Finally, in 1944, he found an aircraft that he deemed a worthy heir: the Lavochkin La-7. However, one of his close friends, Soviet ace Alexander Klubov, was killed in a landing mishap while converting to the La-7. The crash was blamed on the malfunction of the plane's hydraulic system. Pokryshkin subsequently cancelled his regiment's conversion, and there are multiple reports that they instead began flying the Bell P-63 Kingcobra. Through the Lend-Lease agreement with United States, the Soviet Union was not allowed to use P-63s against Germany; they were given only to be used in the eventual battle with Japan. Thus it is quite understandable that no mention of this appears in any official records. However, personal accounts of German pilots and flak crewmen include encounters with P-63s in the skies of eastern Prussia, and P-63 operations are mentioned in the memoirs of a pilot in Pokryshkin's squadron. It is reported that 9th Fighter Aviation Division was given approximately 36 P-63s but these were not used while the fighting was still in progress.

The designations of MiG-3 aircraft used by Pokryshkin were, in the likeliest order of use, "7", "4", "01", "White-5" (with "GVARDIYA" on the intakes – likely dating to when the unit was awarded this designation), and finally "67". He then flew Yak-1 fighters when the unit partially re-equipped with them.

He flew P-39K-1 "White-13" 42-4421 over the Kuban. He converted in late June to P-39N-0 42-9004 "White 100". "White 100" was damaged in August or September 1943. The only known photograph of 42-9004 dates from around this time: it shows the nose resting on a saw horse with the nose wheel main leg hyper-extended so the nose wheel rests on the ground. According to a VVS color scheme research website, 42-9004 was struck by inadvertent gunfire from a badly damaged Il-2 that had a rough landing, and on one of its last bounces the guns went off and, among other things, the gunfire struck, such as the aircrew dugout, hit the parked Airacobra.

About this time Pokryshkin changed to P-39N-5 42-19158 (or possibly a different N-5). which was also designated "White-100". (This is according to the document for an award to an aircraft mechanic assigned to 42-19158, for keeping it airworthy and ready to fly combat missions for 100 flights in a row.) On 28 May 1943, Pokryshkin flew P-39D-2 41-38520 ("White-17") for a single mission. There is a photo of him post-mission bending to remove his parachute straps in front of the nose of 41-38520. In the famous photo taken of him using a stretch of German "autobahn" as a runway, he was flying a P-39Q-15 designated "White-50", with the serial number painted out (the same aircraft was originally assigned to K. V. Sukhov).

He used five La-7 aircraft with the inscription, "From the Workers of Novosibirsk to Hero of the Soviet Union Alexander Ivanovich Pokhryshkin", but did not fly in them himself. A La-7-equipped unit was, in 1945, made a part of the 9th Guards Division, making it a four-regiment division. At one point in 1944, he was apparently given a La-5FN for his personal use, pending the hoped-for Lavochkin conversion of the entire unit.

The unit apparently flew P-63A or C Kingcobras after the war, and Pokryshkin would have again numbered his aircraft "100". Finally, one or more of the 9th Guards Fighter Division units may have eventually converted to the Yak-9P before his attendance at the War College in 1948. After his appointment as DOSAAF director in the early 1950s, he had use of a MiG-15, and, later, of an Il-12 or Il-14.

== Final tally ==
Pokryshkin's score is heavily disputed among historians. Overclaiming was not uncommon in World War II, and Pokryshkin's claims in his memoir are much higher than recent estimates by historians and official records, and recent estimates are generally lower than older estimates. In 1986 Oleg Levchenko claimed that Pokryshkin in fact shot down 94 enemy aircraft, damaged 19 and destroyed three more on the ground, and said that no less than 15 victories scored in 1941 were not taken into account, because the documents confirming them were destroyed during the hurried withdrawal from encirclement during the Battle of Uman. However, Levchenko's claims are generally disputed in 21st century estimates, which tend to place Pokryshkin's tally in the mid 40s. Thomas Polak and Christopher Shores credited him with 53 solo and 6 shared victories in their 1999 book, however the bibliography of the book cites Pokryshkin's memoirs instead of any official documents, and the tallies of several other aviators are heavily inflated to match the official Soviet claims. Russian historian Mikhail Bykov credited him with 43 individual and 3 shared victories in a 2014 book; a decade earlier, in an article titled Мутное Небо 1941 года ("The Murky Sky of 1941") with Aleksandr Rodionov he claimed that Pokryshkin tried to steal Rechkalov's kills during 1941. Andrey Simonov and Nikolai Bodrikhin credited him with 45 solo and 4 shared shootdowns in a 2017 book.

== Honours and awards ==
Soviet awards

- Three times Hero of the Soviet Union (24 May 1943 – № 993, 24 August 1943 – II № 10, 19 August 1944 – III № 1)
- Six Orders of Lenin (22 December 1941 – № 7086; 24 May 1943 – № 9600; 24 August 1943 – № 124904; 21 October 1967 – № 344099; 21 February 1978 – № 429973; 5 March 1983 – № 400362)
- Order of the October Revolution (5 March 1973 – № 1793)
- Order of the Red Banner, four times (22 April 1943 – № 66983; 18 July 1943 – № 8305 / 2; 24 December 1943 – № 448 / 3; 20 April 1953 – № 1392 / 4)
- Order of Suvorov, 2nd class, twice (6 April 1945 – № 1484; 29 May 1945 – № 1662)
- Order of the Patriotic War, 1st class (11 March 1985 – № 537 850)
- Order of the Red Star, twice (6 November 1947 – № 2762070; 4 June 1955 – № 3341640)
- Order for Service to the Homeland in the Armed Forces of the USSR, 3rd class (30 April 1975 – № 0039)
- Medal for Combat Service (3 November 1944)
- Medal "For Development of the Virgin Lands" (5 November 1964)
- Medal "Veteran of the Armed Forces of the USSR" (30 April 1984)
- Medal "For Strengthening Military Cooperation" (31 May 1980)
- Campaign, jubilee and commemorative medals
- Honorary Citizen of: Novosibirsk, Mariupol and Bălți
- Novosibirsk airport Tolmachevo, russian:(Аэропо́рт Толмачёво)(IATA: OVB, ICAO: UNNT)(Ob, Russia) was named after him.

Foreign awards

- Distinguished Service Medal (USA)
- Order of the People's Republic of Bulgaria, 1st class (Bulgaria)
- Order of Tudor Vladimirescu, 2nd and 3rd classes (Romania)
- Order of Karl Marx (East Germany)
- Silver Cross of the Virtuti Militari (Poland)
- Knight's Cross of the Order of Polonia Restituta (Poland)
- Order of Sukhbaatar (Mongolia)
- Order of the Red Banner (Mongolia)
