= Onești, Strășeni =

Onești
- Village
- Location within Moldova
- Coordinates: 47.2772222222°N 28.5541666667°E
- Country: Moldova
- District: Strășeni District

Government
  - Mayor: Oleg Cotelea (PDM)

Population (2014 census)
  - Total: 834
- Time zone: UTC+2 (EET)
  - Summer (DST): UTC+3 (EEST)

Onești is a village in Strășeni District, Moldova.
