= Corina Fusu =

Moldovan politician (born 1959)

Corina Fusu OR
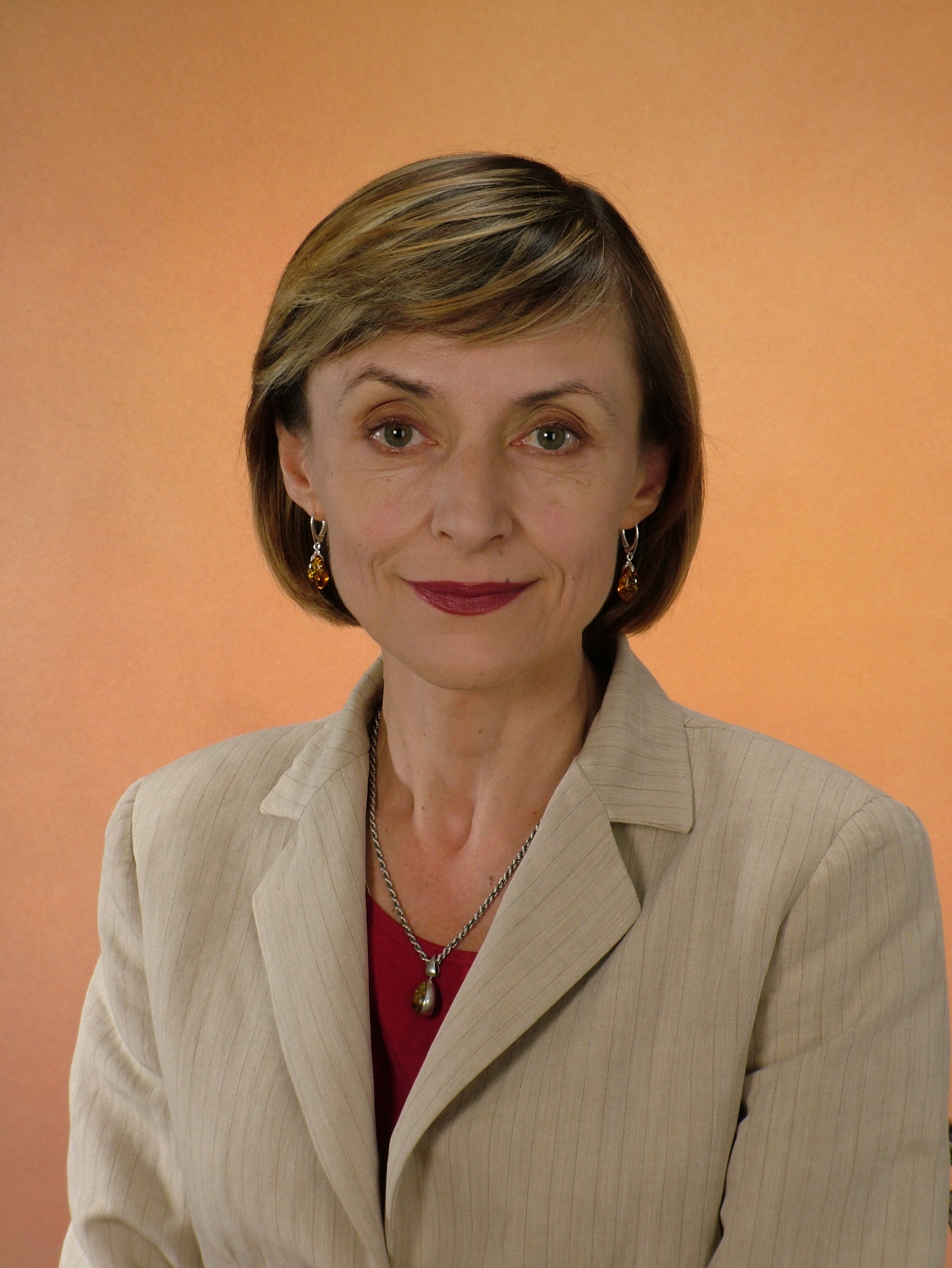
- Fusu in 2008

Minister of Education
- In office 30 July 2015 – 30 May 2017
- President: Nicolae Timofti; Igor Dodon
- Prime Minister: Valeriu Streleț; Gheorghe Brega (acting); Pavel Filip
- Preceded by: Maia Sandu
- Succeeded by: Monica Babuc (as Minister of Education, Culture and Research)

Member of the Moldovan Parliament
- In office 22 April 2009 – 31 July 2015
- Parliamentary group: Liberal Party

Member of the Chișinău Municipal Council
- In office 3 June 2007 – 5 April 2009

Personal details
- Born: 4 September 1959 (age 66) Chișinău, Moldavian SSR, Soviet Union
- Party: Liberal Party (PL)
- Profession: Journalist

Corina Fusu (born 4 September 1959) is a Moldovan politician.

== Biography ==
She has been a member of the Parliament of Moldova from 2009 to 2015.
