= Corneliu Popovici =

Moldovan politician (born 1970)

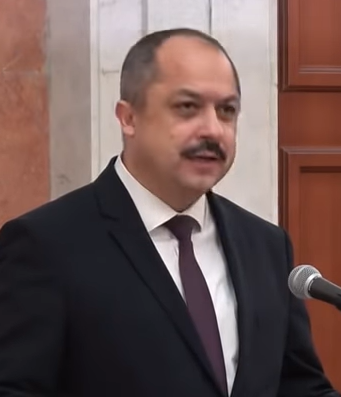
- Popovici in 2019

Education, Culture and Research Advisor to the President
- In office 17 March 2020 – 22 December 2020
- President: Igor Dodon
- Succeeded by: Liliana Nicolaescu-Onofrei
- In office 26 December 2016 – 14 November 2019
- President: Igor Dodon
- Preceded by: Mihail Șleahtițchi

Minister of Education, Culture and Research
- In office 14 November 2019 – 16 March 2020
- President: Igor Dodon
- Prime Minister: Ion Chicu
- Preceded by: Liliana Nicolaescu-Onofrei
- Succeeded by: Igor Șarov

Personal details
- Born: 26 September 1970 (age 55) Florești, Moldavian SSR, Soviet Union

Corneliu Popovici (born 26 September 1970) is a Moldovan politician. He served as Minister of Education, Culture and Research from 14 November 2019 to 16 March 2020 in the cabinet of Prime Minister Ion Chicu.

== Political positions ==
Popovici is a Moldovenist. He stated that the idea of the unification of Moldova and Romania is "national treason" and stated that Moldova should accept less scholarships from Romania.

Popovici has described the union of Bessarabia with Romania as "the occupation and annexation of Bessarabia by a foreign Army".

Political offices
Preceded by Liliana Nicolăescu-Onofrei	Minister of Education, Culture and Research; 2019–2020	Succeeded by Igor Șarov
