= Social Democratic Alliance of Moldova =

The Social Democratic Alliance of Moldova (Romanian: Alianţa Social-Democrată din Moldova, ASDM) was a political party in Moldova.

== History ==
The party was established on 19 April 1997 as the Civic Alliance for Reform (Alianţa Civică pentru Reforme). It joined the Civic Alliance "Ant" coalition to contest the 1998 parliamentary elections. The alliance finished sixth with 3.3% of the vote, but failed to win a seat. On 27 November 1999 the party held its third congress, at which it was agreed to rename the party Social Democracy Party "Ant" (Partidul Democraţiei Sociale "Furnica").

In 2001 the party joined the Braghiş Alliance, an electoral alliance set up by Prime Minister Dumitru Braghiș to contest the 2001 parliamentary elections. The Alliance won 19 seats in the elections, emerging as the second-largest faction in Parliament behind the Party of Communists of the Republic of Moldova, which won 71 seats.

At the fourth party congress on 15 December 2001, 645 of the 647 party members present voted to change the party's name again, this time to Social Democratic Alliance of Moldova. Braghiș was also elected as the party's leader. In January 2002 the Plai Natal social-political movement led by Vladimir Babii merged into the party.

On 19 July 2003 the party's fifth congress voted to merge the party into the Our Moldova Alliance.
