= Monica Babuc =

Moldovan politician and historian (born 1964)

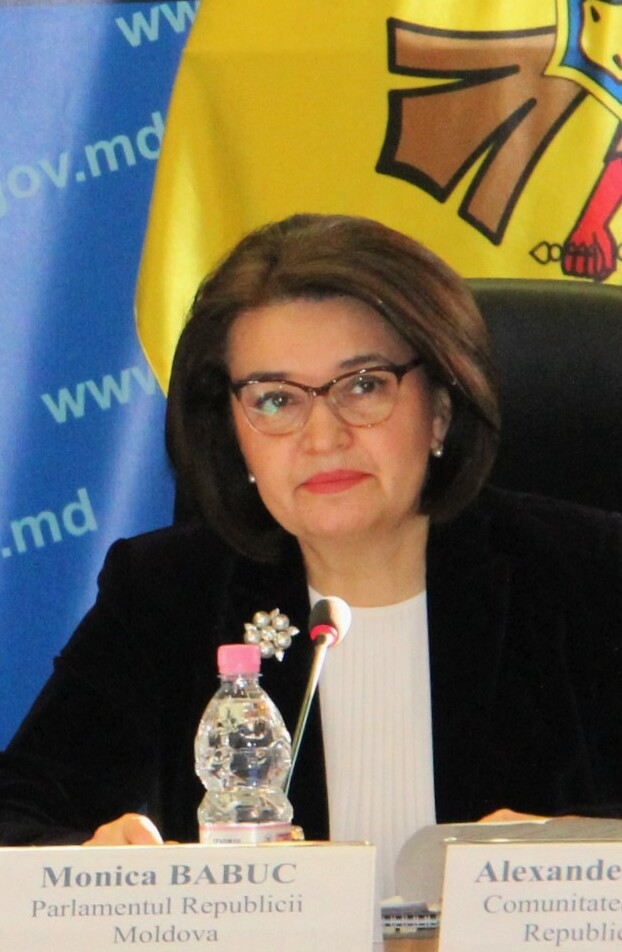
- Babuc in 2020

Member of the Moldovan Parliament
- In office 9 March 2019 – 23 July 2021
- Parliamentary group: Democratic Party
- In office 9 December 2014 – 18 February 2015
- Succeeded by: Eugeniu Nichiforciuc
- Parliamentary group: Democratic Party

Vice President of the Moldovan Parliament
- In office 18 June 2019 – 4 December 2020 Serving with: Ion Ceban; Mihai Popșoi; Alexandru Slusari; Vlad Batrîncea
- President: Igor Dodon
- Prime Minister: Maia Sandu; Ion Chicu
- Speaker: Zinaida Greceanîi
- Preceded by: Vladimir Vitiuc
- Succeeded by: Vladimir Vitiuc

Minister of Education, Culture and Research
- In office 26 July 2017 – 8 June 2019
- President: Igor Dodon
- Prime Minister: Pavel Filip
- Preceded by: Corina Fusu (as Minister of Education)
- Succeeded by: Liliana Nicolaescu-Onofrei

Minister of Culture
- In office 30 May 2013 – 26 July 2017
- President: Nicolae Timofti; Igor Dodon
- Prime Minister: Iurie Leancă; Chiril Gaburici; Natalia Gherman (acting); Valeriu Streleț; Gheorghe Brega (acting); Pavel Filip
- Preceded by: Boris Focșa
- Succeeded by: Sergiu Prodan (2021)

Personal details
- Born: 29 March 1964 (age 62) Bardar, Moldavian SSR, Soviet Union
- Party: European Social Democratic Party
- Other political affiliations: Alliance for European Integration
- Profession: Historian

Monica Babuc (born 29 March 1964) is a politician and historian from the Republic of Moldova, who was Minister of Culture of the Republic of Moldova in four consecutive cabinets (Leancă, Gaburici, Streleţ and Filip) from 2013 to 2019. During her tenure as Minister of Culture she approved the strategy "Culture-2020", laws on cinematography, public libraries, and scholarships. She also helped create the National Center of Cinematography, the National Film Archive and the Cinematography Register. She also announced in 2017 that the ministry would complete an evaluation of reform to schools.

Monica Babuc is a member of the Democratic Party of Moldova, and formerly a member of the Christian Democratic People's Party. From 2019 to 2020, she was Deputy Speaker of the Parliament. She was the interim chairman of the Democratic Party of Moldova in 2021.

In May 2015 she submitted his candidacy for the mayoralty of Chișinău. In the televised electoral debates, she admitted that she speaks Romanian and is equally Romanian and Moldovan. At the local elections in Chișinău on 14 June 2015 Monica Babuc accrued 2.17% of the vote.

In March 2023 she became the head of the Romanian Cultural Institute in Chișinău.

== Early life ==
She was born on 29 March 1967 in Bardar in the Moldavian SSR. From 1981 to 1986, she studied at Moldova State University in the Faculty of History, and then afterwards completed her higher education at Moscow State University until 1989. After graduating, from 1989 to 1990 she was a lecturer in the Department of Political History at Moldova State University, and was then from 1990 to 2001 a consultant to the Committee on Culture, Science, Education and Media in the Parliament of Moldova.

== Family ==
She is married and has a child. In addition to Romanian, she speaks Russian, French and English.
