= Singureni, Rîșcani =

Singureni
- Village
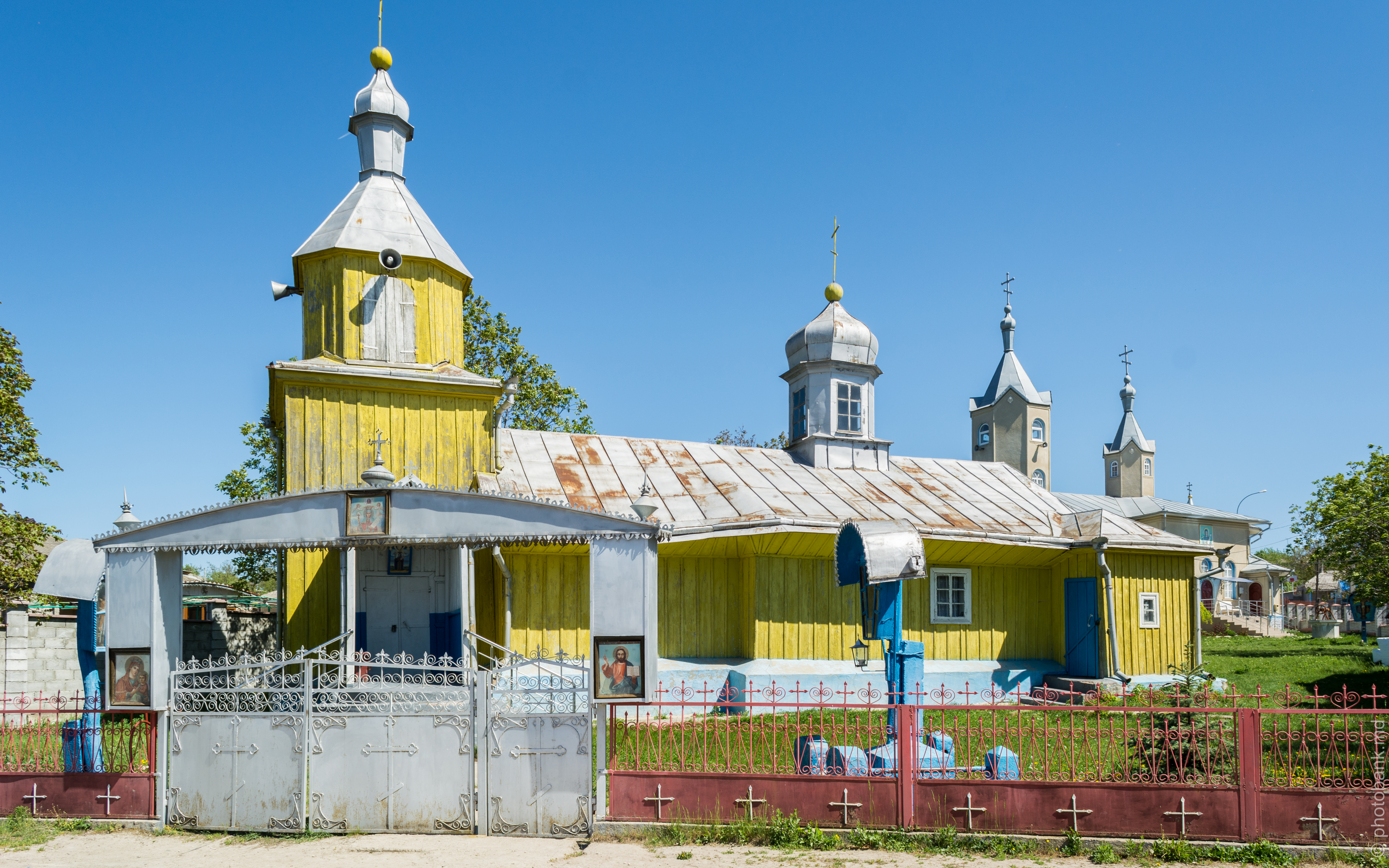
- St. Paraskeva church

- Location in Moldova
- Coordinates: 47°49′N 27°51′E
- Country: Moldova
- District: Rîșcani District

Population (2014 census)
  - Total: 1,848
- Time zone: UTC+2 (EET)
  - Summer (DST): UTC+3 (EEST)

Singureni is a village in Rîșcani District, Moldova.

Bălți-Singureni Airfield was located in Singureni.

== Notable people ==
- Leonid Bujor
