= 2003 Moldovan local elections =

Local elections were held in Moldova on 25 May 2003, with a runoff for mayors on 8 June 2003.

Party of Communists of the Republic of Moldova (PCRM) performed most strongly overall, securing 41.1% of mayoralties, control of 54.6% of municipal councils, and control of 49.9% of local councils.
