= Braghiș Alliance =

Political coalition in Moldova

The Braghiș Alliance Electoral Bloc (Romanian: Blocul electoral "Alianța Braghiș", BeAB) was a six-party centre-left political alliance in Moldova.

== History ==
The Alliance was formed by Prime Minister Dumitru Braghiș to contest the 2001 parliamentary elections. It consisted of six small centre-left parties; the Movement of Professionals "Hope", the New Force Movement, the Social Democracy Party "Ant", the Socialist Party of Moldova, the Centrist Union of Moldova, and the Labour Union.

The Alliance won 19 seats in the elections, emerging as the second-largest faction in Parliament behind the Party of Communists of the Republic of Moldova, which won 71 seats. In 2003 the Social Democracy Party "Ant" (by then renamed the Social Democratic Alliance) joined the Our Moldova Alliance.

== Membership ==
Party	Abbr.	Lead candidate	Candidates	Elected MPs
Independents	Ind.	Dumitru Braghiș	33 / 101	10 / 19
Social Democracy Party "Ant"	PDSF	Vladimir Cociorvă	24 / 101	3 / 19
Centrist Union of Moldova	UCM	Ion Morei	14 / 101	1 / 19
Socialist Party of Moldova	PSM	Dumitru Zidu	10 / 101	2 / 19
Labour Union	UM	Gheorghe Sima	8 / 101	1 / 19
Movement of Professionals "Hope"	MPSN	Vitalie Mrug	7 / 101	1 / 19
New Force Movement	MFN	Valeriu Pleșca	5 / 101	1 / 19
