= Moldovan Parliament 2005–2009 =

The Parliament of the Republic of Moldova elected on 6 March 2005 had 101 seats.

== Parliamentary positions ==
- Speaker of the Parliament - Marian Lupu
- Deputy Speaker of the Parliament
- Standing Bureau

The working body of the Parliament - the Standing Bureau - is formed taking into consideration the proportional representation of the factions in the Legislative body. The Chairman and Deputy Chairmen are its ex officio members. The number of members of the Standing Bureau is determined by the Parliament's decision.

- Marian Lupu - Speaker of the Parliament, representing the Party of Communists of the Republic of Moldova (PCRM)
- Maria Postoico - Deputy Speaker of the Parliament, representing the Party of Communists of the Republic of Moldova (PCRM)
- Iurie Roşca - Deputy Speaker of the Parliament, representing the Christian-Democratic People's Party
- Dumitru Braghiş - representing the Party Alliance Our Moldova
- Ivan Calin - representing the Party of Communists of the Republic of Moldova (PCRM)
- Dumitru Diacov - representing the Democratic Party of Moldova
- Vladimir Eremciuc - representing the Party of Communists of the Republic of Moldova (PCRM)
- Eugenia Ostapciuc - representing the Party of Communists of the Republic of Moldova (PCRM)
- Oleg Serebrian - representing the Social Liberal Party
- Victor Stepaniuc - representing the Party of Communists of the Republic of Moldova (PCRM)
- Serafim Urechean - representing the Party Alliance Our Moldova

== Members ==
Deputy	Party
Alim Afonin	Party of Communists of the Republic of Moldova
Mircea Anton	Party of Communists of the Republic of Moldova
Vasile Balan	Electoral Bloc Democratic Moldova
Galina Balmoş	Party of Communists of the Republic of Moldova
Ivan Banari	Electoral Bloc Democratic Moldova
Vasile Bodişteanu	Party of Communists of the Republic of Moldova
Iurie Bolboceanu	Electoral Bloc Democratic Moldova
Nicolae Bondarciuc	Party of Communists of the Republic of Moldova
Elena Bondarenco	Party of Communists of the Republic of Moldova
Serafima Borgan	Party of Communists of the Republic of Moldova
Ludmila Borgula	Party of Communists of the Republic of Moldova
Vladimir Braga	Electoral Bloc Democratic Moldova
Dumitru Braghiş	Electoral Bloc Democratic Moldova
Leonid Bujor	Electoral Bloc Democratic Moldova
Ghenadii Bulgacov	Party of Communists of the Republic of Moldova
Valentina Buliga	Electoral Bloc Democratic Moldova
Ivan Calin	Party of Communists of the Republic of Moldova
Valerii Călmăţui	Party of Communists of the Republic of Moldova
Mihail Camerzan	Party of Communists of the Republic of Moldova
Ecaterina Cavlac	Party of Communists of the Republic of Moldova
Alexandr Ceaicovschi	Party of Communists of the Republic of Moldova
Iosif Chetraru	Party of Communists of the Republic of Moldova
Adriana Chiriac	Christian-Democratic People's Party
Vladimir Ciobanu	Electoral Bloc Democratic Moldova
Ivan Ciontoloi	Electoral Bloc Democratic Moldova
Vasile Colţa	Electoral Bloc Democratic Moldova
Valeriu Cosarciuc	Electoral Bloc Democratic Moldova
Alexandru Cotorobai	Party of Communists of the Republic of Moldova
Vlad Cubreacov	Christian-Democratic People's Party
Valentina Cuşnir	Christian-Democratic People's Party
Albert Datco	Party of Communists of the Republic of Moldova
Nicolai Deatovschi	Electoral Bloc Democratic Moldova
Dumitru Diacov	Electoral Bloc Democratic Moldova
Semion Dragan	Party of Communists of the Republic of Moldova
Vladimir Dragomir	Party of Communists of the Republic of Moldova
Vladimir Eremciuc	Party of Communists of the Republic of Moldova
Iurie Eriomin	Party of Communists of the Republic of Moldova
Vladimir Filat	Electoral Bloc Democratic Moldova
Valerii Garev	Party of Communists of the Republic of Moldova
Stella Gherman	Party of Communists of the Republic of Moldova
Valentina Golban	Electoral Bloc Democratic Moldova
Petru Gozun	Party of Communists of the Republic of Moldova
Lora Grosu	Electoral Bloc Democratic Moldova
Vasile Grozav	Electoral Bloc Democratic Moldova
Eva Gudumac	Party of Communists of the Republic of Moldova
Valeriu Guma	Electoral Bloc Democratic Moldova
Ion Guţu	Electoral Bloc Democratic Moldova
Ivan Guţu	Party of Communists of the Republic of Moldova
Lidia Guţu	Electoral Bloc Democratic Moldova
Nicolae Guţul	Party of Communists of the Republic of Moldova
Vasile Iovv	Party of Communists of the Republic of Moldova
Alexei Ivanov	Party of Communists of the Republic of Moldova
Dumitru Ivanov	Electoral Bloc Democratic Moldova
Zoia Jalba	Christian-Democratic People's Party
Alexandru Jdanov	Party of Communists of the Republic of Moldova
Igor Klipii	Electoral Bloc Democratic Moldova
Angela Leahu	Christian-Democratic People's Party
Alexandru Lipcan	Electoral Bloc Democratic Moldova
Marian Lupu	Party of Communists of the Republic of Moldova
Oleg Mantorov	Party of Communists of the Republic of Moldova
Anton Miron	Party of Communists of the Republic of Moldova
Vadim Mişin	Party of Communists of the Republic of Moldova
Victor Mîndru	Party of Communists of the Republic of Moldova
Mihail Mocan	Party of Communists of the Republic of Moldova
Gheorghe Mustaţă	Party of Communists of the Republic of Moldova
Ion Neagu	Christian-Democratic People's Party
Alexandru Oleinic	Electoral Bloc Democratic Moldova
Nicolae Oleinic	Party of Communists of the Republic of Moldova
Anatolie Onceanu	Electoral Bloc Democratic Moldova
Eugenia Ostapciuc	Party of Communists of the Republic of Moldova
Arcadii Pasecinic	Party of Communists of the Republic of Moldova
Vitalia Pavlicenco	Electoral Bloc Democratic Moldova
Grigore Petrenco	Party of Communists of the Republic of Moldova
Vasile Pintea	Electoral Bloc Democratic Moldova
Ion Pleşca	Electoral Bloc Democratic Moldova
Gheorghe Popa	Party of Communists of the Republic of Moldova
Maria Postoico	Party of Communists of the Republic of Moldova
Dumitru Prijmireanu	Party of Communists of the Republic of Moldova
Marcel Răducan	Electoral Bloc Democratic Moldova
Iurie Roşca	Christian-Democratic People's Party
Ştefan Secăreanu	Christian-Democratic People's Party
Oleg Serebrian	Electoral Bloc Democratic Moldova
Mihail Sidorov	Party of Communists of the Republic of Moldova
Sergiu Stati	Party of Communists of the Republic of Moldova
Victor Stepaniuc	Party of Communists of the Republic of Moldova
Iurie Stoicov	Party of Communists of the Republic of Moldova
Gheorghe Susarenco	Christian-Democratic People's Party
Valentina Serpul	Christian-Democratic People's Party
Boris Stepa	Party of Communists of the Republic of Moldova
Dmitrii Todoroglo	Party of Communists of the Republic of Moldova
Anatol Țăranu	Electoral Bloc Democratic Moldova
Oleg Ţulea	Electoral Bloc Democratic Moldova
Vladimir Ţurcan	Party of Communists of the Republic of Moldova
Veaceslav Untilă	Electoral Bloc Democratic Moldova
Serafim Urechean	Electoral Bloc Democratic Moldova
Ala Ursul	Party of Communists of the Republic of Moldova
Ion Varta	Christian-Democratic People's Party
Vladimir Vitiuc	Party of Communists of the Republic of Moldova
Irina Vlah	Party of Communists of the Republic of Moldova
Anatolie Zagorodnîi	Party of Communists of the Republic of Moldova
Larisa Zimina	Party of Communists of the Republic of Moldova
