= Marcel Răducan =

Moldovan politician (born 1967)

Member of the Moldovan Parliament
- In office 9 December 2014 – 30 November 2018
- Succeeded by: Pavel Ianeț
- Parliamentary group: Democratic Party
- In office 29 July 2009 – 25 September 2009
- Succeeded by: Valentina Stratan
- Parliamentary group: Democratic Party
- In office 17 March 2005 – 22 April 2009
- Parliamentary group: Democratic Moldova Electoral Bloc; Democratic Party

Minister of Regional Development and Construction
- In office 25 September 2009 – 18 February 2015
- President: Mihai Ghimpu (acting); Vladimir Filat (acting); Marian Lupu (acting); Nicolae Timofti
- Prime Minister: Vladimir Filat; Iurie Leancă
- Preceded by: Vladimir Baldovici
- Succeeded by: Vasile Bîtca

Vice President of the Moldovan Parliament
- In office 10 September 2009 – 25 September 2009 Serving with: Iurie Țap
- President: Vladimir Voronin; Mihai Ghimpu (acting)
- Prime Minister: Zinaida Greceanîi; Vitalie Pîrlog (acting)
- Speaker: Mihai Ghimpu
- Succeeded by: Alexandr Stoianoglo

Deputy Minister of Industry and Trade
- In office 24 September 1998 – 21 December 1999
- President: Petru Lucinschi
- Prime Minister: Ion Ciubuc; Ion Sturza
- Minister: Ion Tănase; Alexandra Can

Personal details
- Born: 10 February 1967 (age 59) Grinăuţi-Moldova, Moldavian SSR, Soviet Union
- Party: Democratic Party of Moldova; Alliance for European Integration (2009–present)
- Profession: engineer

Marcel Răducan (born 10 February 1967) is a Moldovan politician, a deputy in the Legislature 2005–2009 elected on the lists of the Electoral Bloc Democratic Moldova. From 2009 to February 2015 he served as Minister of Regional Development and Construction in the First Vlad Filat Cabinet and in the Second Filat Cabinet as well. From 30 November 2018 he is the President of the Competition Council.

== Biography ==
Răducan was born on 10 February 1967 in Grinăuți-Moldova, Ocnița district. He is an engineer-mechanic, executive director of the enterprise with foreign capital "Avirom-Prod". In March 2005, he was elected a deputy in the Parliament from the "Our Moldova" Bloc. He is a member of the Democratic Party of Moldova. From 2005 until 2009 he was a member of the Parliament of the Republic of Moldova, member of the parliamentary commission for agriculture and processing industry and of the Committee on Agriculture and Food Industry, from the faction of the Democratic Party of Moldova.

By the Decree of the President of the Republic of Moldova no. 4-V from 25 September 2009 was appointed Minister of Regional Development and Construction of the Republic of Moldova. He was in office until December 2014, than until the Gaburici Cabinet was invested in February 2015.

In April 2015, he was awarded the "Order of Honor".

== Family ==
Marcel Răducan is married to Aurelia Răducan, a doctor, and has two boys: Gicu and Călin.
