= Anatolie =

Anatolie is a Romanian-language male given name, primarily used in Moldova. Notable people with the name include:

- Anatolie (Botnari), a bishop of the Moldovan Orthodox Church under the Moscow Patriarchate
- Anatolie Arhire, a Moldovan politician, member of the Parliament of Moldova since 2009
- Anatolie Boeștean (born 1985), is a Moldovan football player
- Anatolie Chirinciuc (born 1989), Moldovan footballer
- Anatolie Cîrîcu (born 1988), a Moldovan weightlifter
- Anatolie Dimitriu (born 1973) is a politician from Moldova, member of the Parliament of Moldova
- Anatolie Doroș (born 1983), a Moldovan international footballer
- Anatolie Ghilaș (born 1957, Pereni) is a Moldovan politician who has been a member of the Parliament of Moldova between 2009 and 2011
- Anatolie Golea, a journalist from the Republic of Moldova
- Anatolie Guidea, a Moldovan-born Bulgarian wrestler
- Anatolie Moraru (born 1894), was a Bessarabian politician, member of the Moldovan Parliament (1917–1918)
- Anatolie Nikolaesh (born 1996), Moldovan-born Russian footballer
- Anatolie Onceanu is a Moldovan politician, member of the Parliament of Moldova (2005–2009)
- Anatolie Ostap (born 1979), is a retired Moldovan footballer
- Anatolie Popa, a Moldavian military commander
- Anatolie Prepeliță, a Moldovan professional footballer
- Anatolie Tihai (1839–1893), Bessarabian hieromonk

== See also ==
- Anatol
- Anatoly
