= Vladimir Ciobanu =

Moldovan politician (born 1953)

Public Administration and Agro-Industrial Advisor to the President
- In office 1 April 2011 – 22 December 2016
- President: Marian Lupu (acting); Nicolae Timofti
- Succeeded by: Ion Perju

Member of the Moldovan Parliament
- In office 17 March 2005 – 22 April 2009
- Parliamentary group: Our Moldova Alliance
- In office 9 April 1998 – 13 March 2001
- Parliamentary group: Democratic Convention

Vice President of the Moldovan Parliament
- In office 18 February 2000 – 13 March 2001
- President: Petru Lucinschi
- Prime Minister: Dumitru Braghiș
- Speaker: Dumitru Diacov

Personal details
- Born: 25 April 1953 (age 72) Taraclia, Moldavian SSR, Soviet Union
- Party: Party Alliance Our Moldova
- Other political affiliations: Electoral Bloc Democratic Moldova

Vladimir Ciobanu (born 25 April 1953) is a Moldovan politician.

== Biography ==
He served as member of the Parliament of Moldova (2005–2009) on the lists of the Democratic Moldova Bloc (from OMA). In 2006 he left the "Our Moldova" Alliance. In December 2009 he joined the Democratic Party of Moldova, shortly after being elected as general secretary of the party.
