= 2005 Moldovan presidential election =

National election

- 4 April 2005
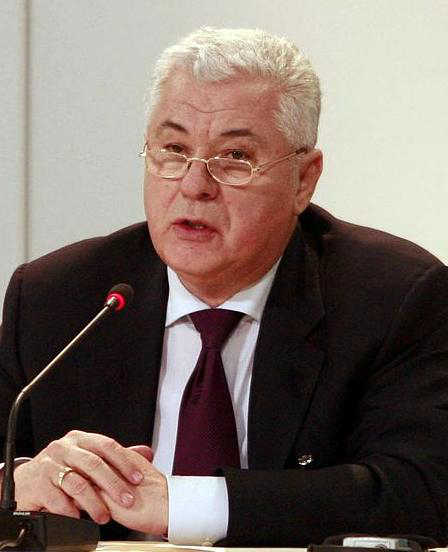
		150px
Nominee	Vladimir Voronin	Gheorghe Duca
Party	PCRM	Independent
Electoral vote	75	1
President before election
Vladimir Voronin
PCRM
Elected President
Vladimir Voronin
PCRM

An indirect presidential election was held in Moldova on 4 April 2005. In the parliamentary elections in March 2005, the Party of Communists of the Republic of Moldova (PCRM) received 46.1% of the vote and won 56 seats in the 101-member Parliament — more than enough for the 51-vote minimum required to remain in government, but short of the 61 votes necessary to elect a president. However, President Voronin received the necessary support from the Christian Democratic People's Party, the Democratic and Social Liberal factions, after he promised to deliver on needed reforms and Euro-Atlantic integration for the country. (The latter two factions broke away from the Electoral Bloc “Moldova Democrată” following the election, leaving the Our Moldova Alliance (AMN) of the former Mayor of Chişinău Serafim Urechean as the second-largest party in Parliament, with 26 seats). Voronin was re-elected with 75 votes; another candidate, Gheorghe Duca, received one vote, and two votes were invalid.

== Results ==
Candidate	Party	Votes	%
Vladimir Voronin	Party of Communists of the Republic of Moldova	75	98.68
Gheorghe Duca	Independent	1	1.32
Total		76	100.00
Valid votes		76	97.44
Invalid/blank votes		2	2.56
Total votes		78	100.00
Registered voters/turnout		101	77.23
Source: eDemocracy
