= Iurie Bolboceanu =

Moldovan politician (born 1959)

Member of the Moldovan Parliament
- In office 24 December 2010 – 9 December 2014
- Parliamentary group: Democratic Party
- In office 30 May 2002 – 22 April 2009
- Parliamentary group: Braghiș Alliance; Our Moldova Alliance

Personal details
- Born: 1959 (age 66–67)
- Party: Electoral Bloc Democratic Moldova

Iurie Bolboceanu (born 1959) is a Moldovan politician.

He served as member of the Parliament of Moldova (2005–2009).

He was arrested on March 17, 2017, on charges of espionage and high treason, on behalf of Russia. He was found guilty and sentenced to fourteen years in prison.
