= Anatolie Dimitriu =

Moldovan jurist and politician

President of the Ialoveni District
- Incumbent
- Assumed office 2010
- Succeeded by: Mihail Silistraru

Member of the Moldovan Parliament
- In office 28 November 2010 – 14 June 2015
- Succeeded by: Nae-Simion Pleșca
- Parliamentary group: Liberal Democratic Party

Personal details
- Born: 19 June 1973 (age 52) Horești, Moldavian SSR, Soviet Union
- Party: Liberal Democratic Party; Alliance for European Integration (2010–present)

Anatolie Dimitriu (born 19 June 1973) is a jurist and politician from the Republic of Moldova, president of Ialoveni District from July 2015, former deputy to the Parliament of the Republic of Moldova in the 19th legislature (2010-2014) and the 20th legislature (2014-2015), elected on the lists of the Liberal Democratic Party of Moldova.

Since 2007 to the present he has been a member of the Central Permanent Bureau and of the National Political Council of PLDM.

At the parliamentary elections in November 2014, he ran on the 21st position on the LDPM list and he succeeded in joining the parliament. In July 2015, after being elected president of the Ialoveni District, he gave up the position of deputy (to comply with the principle of compatibility of public functions) and his mandate went to Nae-Simion Pleşca.

From 1996 to 2009 he worked in the business sphere.

He is married, has two children.
