= Fundurii =

Fundurii may refer to one of two communes in Glodeni District, Moldova:

- Fundurii Noi
- Fundurii Vechi
