= Veaceslav Untilă =

Moldovan politician

Veaceslav Untilă OR
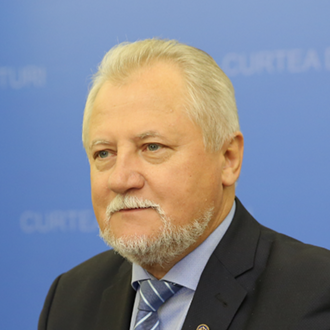
- Untilă in 2019

President of the Court of Accounts
- In office 29 July 2016 – 24 January 2019
- Preceded by: Serafim Urechean
- Succeeded by: Marian Lupu

Member of the Moldovan Parliament
- In office 22 March 2005 – 29 July 2016
- Parliamentary group: Democratic Moldova Electoral Bloc; Our Moldova Alliance; Liberal Party

Deputy Minister of Internal Affairs
- In office 15 June 1998 – 2000
- President: Petru Lucinschi
- Prime Minister: Ion Ciubuc; Ion Sturza; Dumitru Braghiș

Personal details
- Born: 15 June 1956 (age 70) Codreanca, Moldavian SSR, Soviet Union
- Party: Alliance Our Moldova (past)
- Other political affiliations: Alliance for European Integration (2009–13)
- Children: 2
- Education: Moldova State University

Veaceslav Untilă (born 15 June 1956) is a Moldovan politician.

== Biography ==
Veaceslav Untilă was born on 15 June 1956 in the Codreanca village, Strășeni District, Moldavian Soviet Socialist Republic, USSR, to a family of teachers. He graduated from the Engineering School of the Technical University in Chișinău in 1978 and the Law School of the State University of Moldova in 1997. Between 1994 and 1998 he did his PhD at the Academy of Sciences of Moldova and in 1999 he undertook a training program at the George C. Marshall European Center. Between 1978 and 1995, Untilă worked for the Ministry of Internal Affairs (MIA) of the Republic of Moldova, between 1992 and 1995 he was head of the MIA Auto Inspectorate, and between 1998 and 2000 he was deputy minister of MIA. In 2001 he became National Secretary of the cross-governmental committee TRACECA, holding this office until 2002. In 1992, Untilă was involved in the defence of independence and territorial integrity of the Republic of Moldova. He received the Golden Eagle award, the title Chevalier of Order of Honor, Cross of Merit (rank II) and the Silver Medal of the Academy of Sciences of Moldova. Between 1995 and 1998 Mr Untilă serves as international officer for OISR (Geneva). Besides his diplomatic work, Untilă conducts extensive scientific research. He is a PhD in law and the author of tens of publications on the fight against organized crime. In 1999, he became associate professor at the UNESCO International Personnel Management Academy (Kyiv, Ukraine). In 2000, he became Doctor Honoris Causa of the University of Criminology in Moldova. From 1989 to 1993 he was a member of the Chisinau municipal council and in 1999 he became the leader of the public association Civic Strategy. In 2016 Untilă was awarded the Order of Republic for outstanding achievements. He speaks Russian and French, is married to Alexandra Untilă and has two children.

== Political activity ==
Veaceslav Untilă started his political career in 2001, being involved in the campaign for early parliamentary elections. In the same year, he became the president of the Order and Social Justice Party of Moldova. After the latter merged with the National Liberal Party, on September 22, 2001, Untilă became the chairman of the National Council of the Social-Liberal Union Moldova's Strength (USL Forta Moldovei). He further called on all the center-right wing forces to merge into one single party, which to some extent was achieved through the merger of PRCM, USL Forta Moldovei and PNTCD and creation of the Liberal Party on March 24, 2002. Soon after being elected president of the Liberal Party on October 27, 2002, Untilă contributed to the creation of the Moldova Noastra Alliance through the merger of the Liberal Party, Social-Democratic Alliance and Alliance of the Independents (July 19, 2003) and became one of its co-presidents. He was also deputy president of the Electoral Bloc Democratic Moldova. In 2005 Untilă became first-deputy president of the Moldova Noastra Alliance and in 2005 member of the Moldovan Parliament, deputy leader of the parliamentary group of Moldova Noastra Alliance and chair of the parliamentary committee for public administration, environment and territorial development.

In 2008, Untilă successfully advocated for the introduction of the "historical amendment" on the withdrawal of Russian troops and weapons from Moldova in the NATO Parliamentary Assembly resolution. With the formation of a new parliament in Moldova in 2009, he became MP. In January 2010, he joined the European Action Movement (EAM) and during its third Extraordinary Congress he was elected president of the party by a majority vote. Together with Iurie Colesnic, Untilă formed the parliamentary group of EAM.

In March 2011, EAM's Extraordinary Congress decided on the self-dissolution and merger of EAM with the Liberal Party (LP). Later, on March 13, 2011, LP's Republican Council decided to designate Untilă as one of LP's deputy presidents.

On September 26, 2012, Untilă was appointed director of the State Ecologic Inspection of Moldova, holding this office until June 5, 2013. In December 2014, he became Member of the Moldovan Parliament and chairman of the parliamentary committee for national security, defence and public order.

On July 29, 2016, Untilă was appointed President of the Court of Accounts of Moldova for a five-year term.

== Published works ==
- Regulamentul circulaţiei rutiere, Editura Universul, Chișinău, 1995
- Crima organizată – contrasens, Editura Litera, Chișinău, 1999
- Crima organizată – stop, Editura Museum, Chișinău, 2000
- De ce ASC?, Editura Museum, Chișinău, 2000
- Traiectoria evoluţiei politice, Editura Litera, Chișinău, 2003
- Petele negre ale guvernării roșii, Editura Ulise, Chișinău, 2004
- Politica e un joc serios, Editura Ulise, Chișinău, 2006
- Petele negre ale guvernării roșii (volume II), Editura Ulise, Chișinău, 2009
- Politics for Moldova, Editura Ulise, Chișinău, 2011
- Lecții de politică, Editura Pontos, Chișinău, 2016
