= Respect Moldova Movement =

Centre-left political party in Moldova

Respect Moldova Movement Mișcarea Respect Moldova
- Abbreviation: MRM
- Leader: Veaceslav Burlac
- Founder: Eugeniu Nichiforciuc
- Founded: 4 August 2023
- Split from: European Social Democratic Party
- Headquarters: 126 Metropolitan Dosoftei Street, Chișinău
- Membership: 1,600 (2024)
- Ideology: Conservatism; Pro-Europeanism
- Political position: Centre to centre-left
- Colours: Blue

Website
- respect.md

The Respect Moldova Movement (Romanian: Mișcarea Respect Moldova, MRM), also simply Respect Moldova, is a political party in Moldova. Founded on 4 August 2023 by Eugeniu Nichiforciuc, the party adheres to conservatism and is pro-European. The MRM includes many former members of the Democratic Party of Moldova (PDM), including former PDM ministers, members of the Parliament of Moldova (such as Nichiforciuc), mayors and local councillors. Former acting President of Moldova and PDM leader Marian Lupu was president of the party from 2025 to 2026.

== History ==
The Respect Moldova Movement was founded on 4 August 2023 by Eugeniu Nichiforciuc. A former Democratic Party of Moldova (PDM) member of the Parliament of Moldova, Nichiforciuc was excluded from the PDM and its parliamentary faction by the party's new leadership after the PDM lost power in 2019. The MRM is a centrist to centre-left party, adhering to conservatism. As of 2024, it had 1,600 members. According to its statute, the main objective of the party is "building a democratic society, based on unanimously recognized values, but also the affirmation of the Republic of Moldova as a sovereign, independent and neutral state". The MRM also supports the reintegration of Transnistria into Moldova and is pro-European, supporting Moldova's European integration process.

In the 2023 Moldovan local elections, the MRM was the ninth party that won the most mayorships, with a total of 19. In addition, eleven of its representatives were elected as local councillors. The MRM's budget for its electoral campaign was a little over 950,000 Moldovan lei. The party was registered on 31 August 2024 as a participant in the Moldovan European Union membership constitutional referendum on 20 October that year, supporting the "yes" option.

After Moldovan politician and oligarch and former PDM leader Vladimir Plahotniuc left Moldova in 2019, many of his former associates attempted to reinvent and distance themselves from him and restore their own image. Thus, Nichiforciuc maintained a discreet presence until 2023, becoming afterwards vocal about Plahotniuc, claiming that there was no relationship between the two of them and stating in August 2023 that indications were Plahotniuc "should not be with Nichiforciuc or Respect Moldova". Still, according to the Romanian newspaper Libertatea, "in Chișinău circles", Nichiforciuc was seen as an associate of the oligarch. Citing "political sources", Libertatea affirmed that Nichiforciuc was trying to rally around him what remained of the PDM's network under the pressure of keeping the "Plahotniuc project" alive, but under a new face.

Several former ministers and members of parliament of the PDM joined the MRM following the PDM's loss of power, such as former Deputy Minister and later Minister of Education, Culture and Research Lilia Pogolșa and former parliament member Anatolie Zagorodnîi. Multiple mayors and local councillors also switched from the European Social Democratic Party (PSDE; the former PDM, renamed and rebranded) to the MRM, which the PSDE protested as "a classic case of buying party members by a group that believes it can buy respect". To the MRM also joined Bloc of Communists and Socialists (BCS) parliament member Veaceslav Nigai.

On 12 April 2025, Marian Lupu became the president of the Respect Moldova Movement. Lupu had been president of Moldova's Court of Accounts, President of the Parliament and acting President of Moldova, and he was the predecessor of Plahotniuc as PDM leader. Nichiforciuc explained that he stepped down as president to offer the party an opportunity to develop, stated that he knew Lupu both professionally and personally as well as his value and leadership skills, and clarified that he would continue his activity within the party.

On 29 May, Dumitru Diacov, former leader of the PDM and one of its founders, proposed to Lupu and the PSDE's president Tudor Ulianovschi that they merge their parties to restore the PDM. He would have attempted to convince both that this would bring back many former PDM activist leaders. Diacov proposed that Lupu and Ulianovschi could be co-presidents of the merged party, which he suggested would have it easier to overcome the electoral threshold in the 2025 Moldovan parliamentary election; in the latest iData poll at the time, the PSDE had a voting intention of 2.6% and the MRM had one of 2.1%. On 11 August, Diacov called on the PSDE, the MRM and also the Modern Democratic Party (also PDM), led by Boris Foca, to return to the "name", "visions" and "traditions" of the classic PDM and stated that "a more significant effort is needed" for any of the three parties to enter the parliament.

For the 2025 parliamentary election, the MRM's top five candidates on its list were Lupu, former president of the Superior Council of Magistracy (CSM) Victor Micu, Nichiforciuc, Pogolșa and security and defence expert Radu Burduja. At the time, the latter three were vice presidents of the party. The party presented itself as a reformist alternative to the then ruling Party of Action and Solidarity (PAS). Its political platform for the election proposed, among other things, the use of renewable energy in homes and industry; a minimum pension of 5,000 lei, indexed annually to the inflation rate; a reduction of value-added tax (VAT) to 8% for agricultural products; doubling teachers' salaries in the next two years and indexing them annually to inflation; and a reduction in the number of members of the Moldovan parliament from 101 to 61. A representative of the MRM told Moldovan newspaper NordNews that the election should be decided first of all by those living in Moldova and that the diaspora should not have a right to non-resident citizen voting, and she also criticized what she called the privileges of Moldovan politicians and the high salaries of parliament members. The party obtained 0.64% (around 10,000) of all votes at the election.

On 29 May 2026, the party announced that its leadership, including Lupu and Nichiforciuc, had resigned. According to the party, the decision to restructure the MRM's leadership was made after an "extensive analysis" carried out after the 2025 parliamentary election. Veaceslav Burlac was unanimously elected as acting president. A former PDM member, Burlac had held the posts of district councillor, president and deputy president of Criuleni District. He was formally elected as president of the party on 18 July.

== Election results ==
=== Parliament ===
Election	Leader	Performance					Rank	Government
Election	Leader	Votes	%	± pp	Seats	+/–	Rank	Government
2025	Marian Lupu	10,144	0.64%	New	0 / 101	New	8th	Extra-parliamentary
