= Valentina Buliga =

Moldovan politician

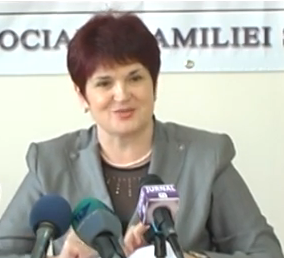
- Buliga in 2015

Member of the Moldovan Parliament
- In office 9 December 2014 – 15 January 2019
- Succeeded by: Gheorghe Brașovschi
- Parliamentary group: Democratic Party
- In office 22 March 2005 – 22 April 2009
- Succeeded by: Oazu Nantoi
- Parliamentary group: Democratic Moldova Electoral Bloc; Democratic Party

Minister of Labour, Social Protection and Family
- In office 25 September 2009 – 18 February 2015
- President: Mihai Ghimpu (acting); Vladimir Filat (acting); Marian Lupu (acting); Nicolae Timofti
- Prime Minister: Vladimir Filat; Iurie Leancă
- Preceded by: Galina Balmoș (as Minister of Social Protection, Family and Child)
- Succeeded by: Ruxanda Glavan

Personal details
- Born: 2 September 1961 (age 65) Horești, Moldavian SSR, Soviet Union
- Party: Democratic Party of Moldova; Alliance for European Integration (2009–present)
- Education: Nicolae Testemițanu State University of Medicine and Pharmacy
- Profession: Pharmacist

Valentina Buliga (born 2 September 1961) is a Moldovan politician. She was the Minister of Labour, Social Protection and Family in the First Vlad Filat Cabinet and in the Second Filat Cabinet as well. Previously he was a deputy in the Parliament of the Republic of Moldova, elected in the Legislature 2005–2009 on the lists of the Democratic Moldova Electoral Bloc.

== Biography ==
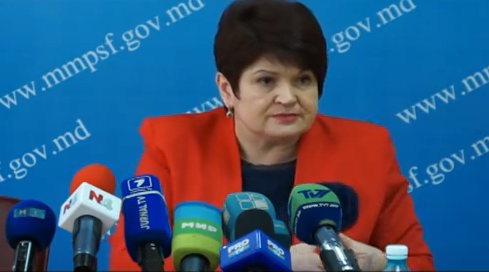
Valentina Buliga

Valentina Buliga was born on 2 September 1961 in Horești, Fălești. In 1983 she graduated the State University of Medicine at the pharmacy specialty (diploma with mention), and in 2004 - the Academy of Public Administration under the President of the Republic of Moldova, a master in public administration.

From 1983 to 1998 he was a pharmacist at the Fălești District Hospital, Fălești Rayonal Central Pharmacy. From 1998 to 2001 he was Head of Department at the Ministry of Health.

From 2001 until 2004 he was the Head of Laboratory at the National Institute of Pharmacy, and from 2004 until 2005 - Head of the Medical Insurance Department in the International Insurance Company "QBE ASITO".

In 2005 she became deputy in the Parliament of the Republic of Moldova on the 16th Legislature in the DPM parliamentary faction and chairman of the parliamentary commission for social protection, health and family.

By the Decree of the President of the Republic of Moldova no. 4-V on 25 September 2009 was appointed Minister of Labor, Social Protection and Family of the Republic of Moldova.

In the local elections in 2011 she ran for Chișinău general mayor's office, winning 2.56% or 8848 valid votes in the first round, and did not participate in round II.

== Family ==
Valentina Buliga is married to Alexei Buliga and together they have two children (a son and a daughter).
