= Pleșca =

Pleșca is a surname. Notable people with the surname include:

- Aurora Pleșca (born 1963), Romanian rower
- Nae-Simion Pleșca (born 1955 or 1957), Moldovan politician
- Răzvan Pleșca (born 1982), Romanian footballer
- Valeriu Pleșca (born 1958), Moldovan lawyer and politician

== See also ==
- Plesca, a village in the Cizer commune in Sălaj County, Romania
