= Stratan =

Stratan is a common surname in Romania and Moldova that may refer to:

- Andrei Stratan (born 1966), Moldovan politician
- Cleopatra Stratan (born 2002), Moldovan singer
- Cosmina Stratan (born 1984), Romanian journalist and film actress
- Dmitri Stratan (born 1975), Soviet water polo forward
- Pavel Stratan (born 1970), Moldovan singer
- Valentina Stratan-Golban, Moldovan politician
