= Ruxanda Glavan =

Moldovan politician (born 1980)

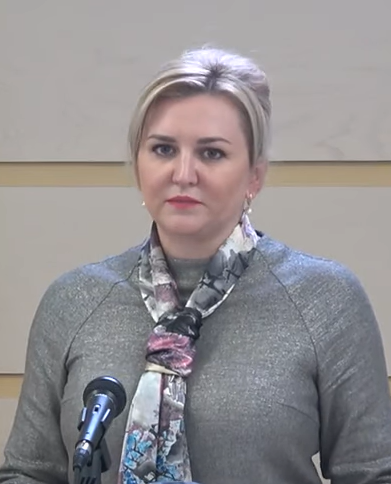
- Glavan in 2020

Member of the Moldovan Parliament
- In office 23 August 2019 – 23 July 2021
- Preceded by: Otilia Drăguțanu
- Parliamentary group: Democratic Party; Pro Moldova Party

Minister of Health
- In office 30 July 2015 – 25 July 2017
- President: Nicolae Timofti; Igor Dodon
- Prime Minister: Valeriu Streleț; Gheorghe Brega (acting); Pavel Filip
- Preceded by: Mircea Buga
- Succeeded by: Stela Grigoraș (as Minister of Health, Labour and Social Protection)

Minister of Labour, Social Protection and Family
- In office 18 February 2015 – 30 July 2015
- President: Nicolae Timofti
- Prime Minister: Chiril Gaburici; Natalia Gherman (acting)
- Preceded by: Valentina Buliga
- Succeeded by: Mircea Buga

Deputy Minister of Labour, Social Protection and Family
- In office 12 June 2013 – 18 February 2015
- President: Nicolae Timofti
- Prime Minister: Iurie Leancă
- Minister: Valentina Buliga

Personal details
- Born: 5 April 1980 (age 46) Chișinău, Moldavian SSR, Soviet Union
- Party: Pro Moldova
- Spouse: Aureliu Cincilei
- Education: Nicolae Testemițanu State University of Medicine and Pharmacy; Grenoble Graduate School of Business
- Occupation: Politician, physician, manager

Ruxanda Glavan (born 5 April 1980) is a Moldovan politician, who since 30 July 2015 until 25 July 2017 served as Minister of Health of Moldova. Previously, since 18 February 2015 until 30 July 2015 she served as Minister of Labour, Social Protection and Family of Moldova. Between 2013-2015 Ruxanda Glavan was Deputy Minister of Labour, Social Protection and Family.

On 1 May 2020, Glavan joined the parliamentary group Pro Moldova, which became a political party on 22 June.
