= Lora Grosu =

Moldovan politician (born 1959)

Member of the Moldovan Parliament
- In office 22 March 2005 – 5 April 2009
- Parliamentary group: Democratic Moldova Electoral Bloc; Democratic Party

Personal details
- Born: 14 September 1959 (age 66)
- Other political affiliations: Electoral Bloc Democratic Moldova

Lora Grosu (born 14 September 1959) is a Moldovan politician.

She served as member of the Parliament of Moldova from 2005 to 2009.
