= Ghilas =

Ghilas or Ghilaş is a surname. Notable people with the surname include:

- Kamel Ghilas (born 1984), Algerian footballer
- Nabil Ghilas (born 1990), Algerian footballer, brother of Kamel
- Anatolie Ghilaş (born 1957), Moldovan politician
