= Stella Gherman =

Moldovan physicist and politician (born 1974)

Member of the Moldovan Parliament
- In office 22 March 2005 – 5 April 2009
- Parliamentary group: Party of Communists

Personal details
- Born: 18 January 1974 (age 52) Slobozia-Șirăuți, Moldavian SSR, Soviet Union
- Party: PCRM

Stella Ion Gherman (born 18 January 1974) is a Moldovan physicist and politician who served in the Parliament of Moldova from 2005 until 2009 as a member of the Party of Communists.

== Biography ==
Stella Gherman was born on 18 January 1974 in the village of Slobozia-Șirăuți in the far northwest of Moldova. A physicist by training, she worked as a physics teacher, and at some point served as mayor of Slobozia-Șirăuți.

In the 2005 Moldovan parliamentary election, Gherman was elected to the Parliament of Moldova as a member of the Party of Communists. While in parliament, she served as secretary of the Commission for Culture, Science, Education, Youth, Sports and Mass Media. In 2006 and 2007, she was a member of the European Union-Moldova Parliamentary Cooperation Committee, and she served on several Parliamentary Friendship Groups, most notably the groups for the United States, the United Kingdom, Russia, and the Baltic states. As a member of the Baltic friendship group, Gherman was part of a 2007 delegation to Latvia. She left parliament at the end of her term in 2009.

Gherman ran again for parliament in the 2019 election, but was defeated.
