= Igor Klipii =

Moldovan politician and diplomat (born 1968)

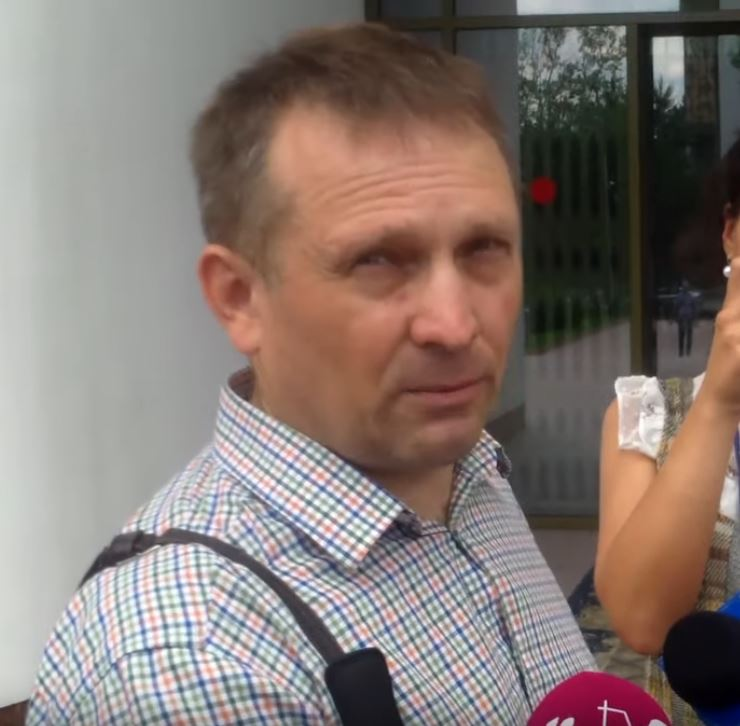
- Klipii in 2019

Moldovan Ambassador to Lithuania
- In office 21 June 2010 – 4 June 2015
- President: Mihai Ghimpu (acting); Vlad Filat (acting); Marian Lupu (acting); Nicolae Timofti
- Prime Minister: Vlad Filat; Iurie Leancă; Chiril Gaburici
- Preceded by: Ion Ciornîi
- Succeeded by: Valeriu Frija

Member of the Moldovan Parliament
- In office 22 March 2005 – 22 April 2009
- Parliamentary group: Democratic Party

Personal details
- Born: 13 January 1968 (age 58) Fundurii Vechi, Moldavian SSR, Soviet Union
- Party: Democratic Party
- Other political affiliations: Electoral Bloc Democratic Moldova
- Spouse: Victoria Klipii

Igor Klipii (born 13 January 1968) is a Moldovan politician and diplomat.

== Biography ==
He studied law and history at the "Ion Creangă" State University in Chişinău and international relations at the National School of Administration and Political Science of Bucharest (Romania) and the European Institute of High International Studies in Nice (France). In 2005 – 2009 he served as member of the Parliament of Moldova. Between 2008 and 2010 he was Deputy Chairman of Democratic Party of Moldova.

In June 2010 Igor Klipii was designated Ambassador of Moldova in Lithuania.
