= Grozavu =

Grozavu is a Romanian surname. Notable people with the surname include:

- Leontin Grozavu (born 1967), Romanian footballer and manager
- Nistor Grozavu (born 1959), Moldovan politician

== See also ==
- Grozav
