= Oleg Țulea =

Moldovan politician (born 1980)

Oleg Ţulea
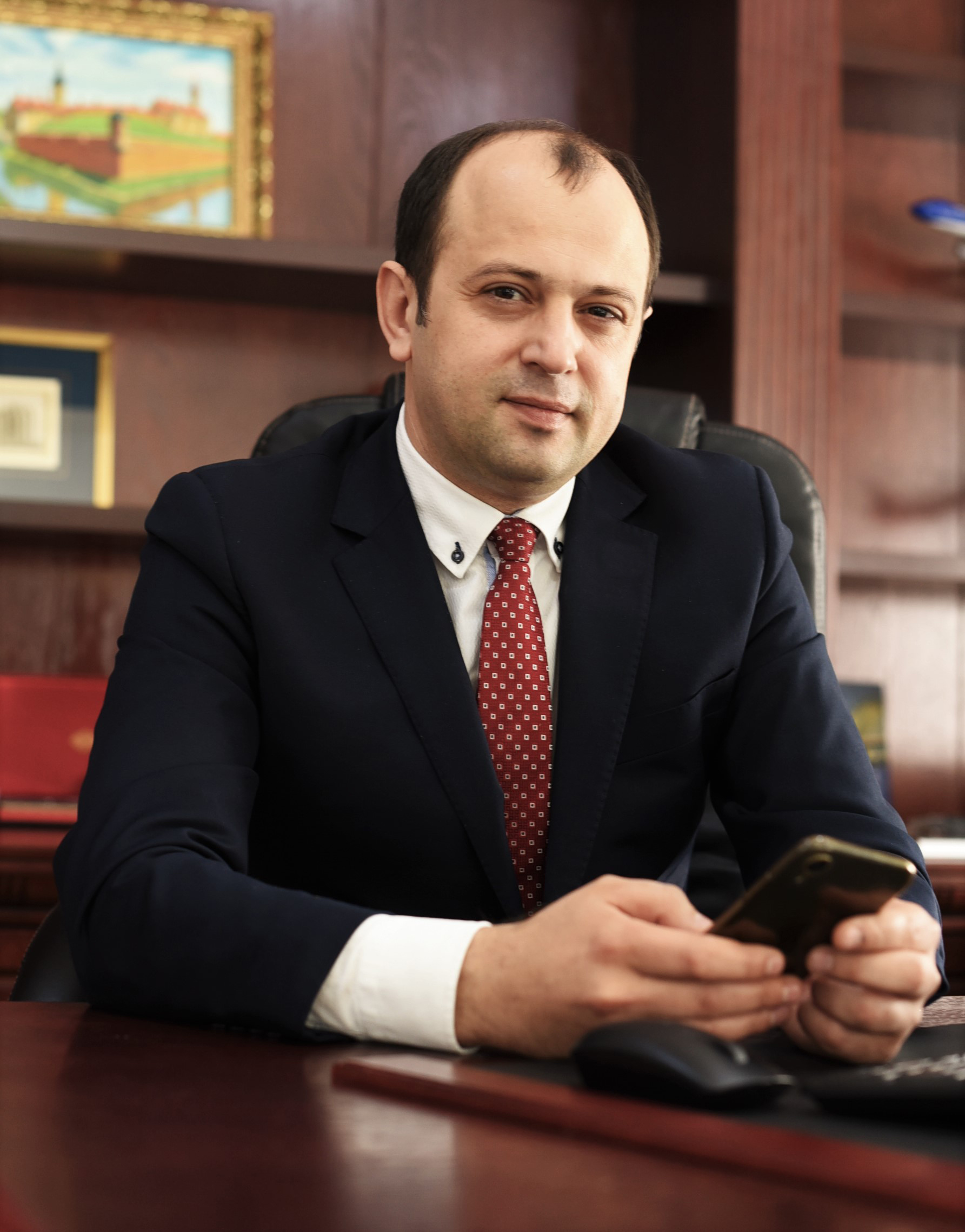
- Țulea in 2020

Moldovan Ambassador to Hungary, Bosnia and Herzegovina, Croatia and Slovenia
- In office 9 November 2020 – 18 December 2024
- President: Igor Dodon; Maia Sandu
- Prime Minister: Ion Chicu; Aureliu Ciocoi (acting); Natalia Gavrilița; Dorin Recean
- Succeeded by: Mihail Barbulat
- In office 28 January 2016 – 27 March 2020
- President: Nicolae Timofti; Igor Dodon
- Prime Minister: Pavel Filip; Maia Sandu; Ion Chicu
- Preceded by: Alexandru Codreanu

Minister of Foreign Affairs and European Integration
- In office 16 March 2020 – 9 November 2020
- President: Igor Dodon
- Prime Minister: Ion Chicu
- Preceded by: Aureliu Ciocoi
- Succeeded by: Aureliu Ciocoi

Member of the Moldovan Parliament
- In office 20 May 2011 – 9 December 2014
- Preceded by: Anatolie Ghilaș
- Parliamentary group: Democratic Party
- In office 24 March 2005 – 22 April 2009
- Parliamentary group: Democratic Party

Deputy Minister of Youth and Sport
- In office 20 November 2009 – 15 June 2011
- President: Mihai Ghimpu (acting); Vladimir Filat (acting); Marian Lupu (acting)
- Prime Minister: Vladimir Filat
- Minister: Ion Cebanu

Personal details
- Born: 31 March 1980 (age 46) Căuşeni, Moldavian SSR, Soviet Union
- Party: Electoral Bloc Democratic Moldova
- Children: 2
- Education: Moldova State University

Oleg Ţulea (born 31 March 1980) is a Moldovan politician who served as the foreign minister of the Republic of Moldova in 2020. He previously served as member of the Parliament of Moldova (2005–2009). 1998, Oleg Tsulya joined the Democratic Party of Moldova (PDM) and was elected chairman of the DPM youth organization "Democratic Youth". On 3 February 2016, he was appointed as the Ambassador to Hungary. On 29 June 2016, he was appointed concurrently as ambassador to Bosnia and Herzegovina, Croatia and Slovenia. He was also the deputy sports minister from 2009 to 2011. He is fluent in Romanian, Russian and English, and speaks French at an intermediate level.
