= Anatolie Onceanu =

Moldovan politician

Member of the Moldovan Parliament
- In office 2005–2009

Personal details
- Born: April 14, 1951 (age 75) Sîngerei city, Sîngerei District, Republic of Moldova
- Other political affiliations: Electoral Bloc Democratic Moldova
- Education: State University of Moldova

Anatolie Onceanu (born April 14, 1951, Sîngerei city, Sîngerei District, Republic of Moldova) is a Moldovan MP in the Parliament of the Republic of Moldova, elected in the Legislature 2005–2009 on the lists of the Electoral Bloc Democratic Moldova.

== Education ==
1968–1975 - State University of Moldova, Faculty of History, specialty - history

== Professional activity ==
- 2005–2009 – MP, Parliament of the Republic of Moldova
- 2003–2005 – Head of the fraction of the Our Moldova Alliance, in the Municipal Council of Chisinau
- 1995–2003 – Deputy-Mayor, Chisinau City Hall
- 1990–1995 – Director, Pedagogical College "Alexei Mateevici" of Chișinău
- 1985–1990 – Instructor, Central Committee of the Communist Party of Moldova
- 1975–1985 – Head of Section, Rayon Committee of the Central Committee of the Leninist-Communist Youth Union of Moldova
- 1973–1975 – Methodist at the Institute for Continuous Training of Teachers of the Ministry of Education of Moldova
