= Vasile Colța =

Moldovan politician (born 1953)

Member of the Moldovan Parliament
- In office 2005–2009

Personal details
- Party: Party Alliance Our Moldova
- Other political affiliations: Electoral Bloc Democratic Moldova

Vasile Colța (born 1953) is a Moldovan politician.

== Biography ==
He served as member of the Parliament of Moldova (2005–2009), on the lists of the Electoral Bloc Democratic Moldova.
