= Eugeniu Nichiforciuc =

Moldovan politician (born 1984)

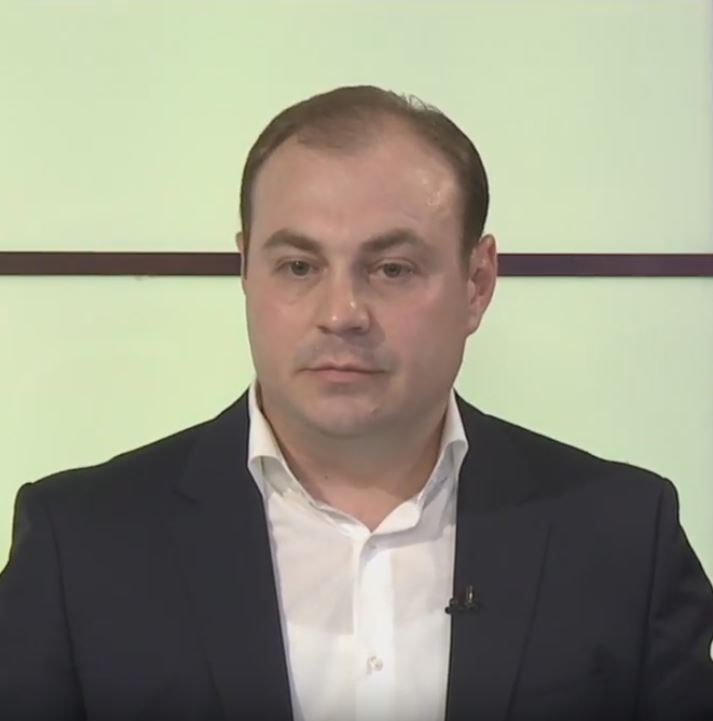
- Nichiforciuc in 2017

President of the Respect Moldova Movement
- In office 4 August 2023 – 12 April 2025
- Succeeded by: Marian Lupu

Member of the Moldovan Parliament
- In office 20 February 2015 – 23 July 2021
- Preceded by: Monica Babuc
- Parliamentary group: Democratic Party

Personal details
- Born: Florești, Moldavian SSR, Soviet Union (now Moldova)

Eugeniu Nichiforciuc (born 6 April 1984) is a Moldovan politician. He served as a Member of the Moldovan Parliament from 2015 to 2021. He founded the party Respect Moldova Movement (MRM) on 4 August 2023, and was its leader until he was succeeded by Marian Lupu on 12 April 2025, continuing his activity within the party afterwards.
