= Vladimir Braga =

Moldovan politician (born 1953)

Vladimir Braga OR

Member of the Moldovan Parliament
- In office 17 March 2005 – 22 April 2009

Personal details
- Other political affiliations: Electoral Bloc Democratic Moldova

Vladimir Braga (born 1953) is a Moldovan politician who was a member of the Parliament of Moldova.

== Biography ==
Braga served as member of the Parliament of Moldova (in the Legislature 2005–2009) on the lists of the Electoral Bloc Democratic Moldova.
