= Golea =

Golea is a surname. Notable people with the surname include:

- Anatolie Golea (born 1965), Moldovan journalist
- Eugenia Golea (born 1971), Romanian artistic gymnast

== See also ==
- El Golea Airport, airport in Algeria
