= Grozav =

Grozav is a Romanian surname. Notable people with the surname include:

- Gheorghe Grozav (born 1990), Romanian footballer
- Ligia Grozav (born 1994), Romanian high jumper
- Vasile Grozav (born 1950), Moldovan politician
