= Anatolie Ghilaș =

Moldovan politician (born 1957)

Member of the Moldovan Parliament
- In office 14 August 2009 – 30 March 2011
- Succeeded by: Oleg Țulea
- Parliamentary group: Democratic Party

Personal details
- Born: 23 January 1957 (age 69) Pereni, Rezina, Moldovan SSR
- Party: Democratic Party; Alliance for European Integration (2009–present)

Anatolie Ghilaş (born 23 January 1957) is a Moldovan politician who was a member of the Parliament of Moldova from 2009 to 2011.
