= Ermoclia =

- Village
- Location in Moldova
- Coordinates: 46°35′N 29°31′E
- Country: Moldova
- District: Ștefan Vodă District

Population (2014 census)
  - Total: 3,846
- Time zone: UTC+2 (EET)
  - Summer (DST): UTC+3 (EEST)
- Area code: +373(242)

Ermoclia is a village in Ștefan Vodă District, Moldova.

== Notable natives ==
- Ion Ciontoloi
