= Vasile Pîntea =

Moldovan politician

Member of the Moldovan Parliament
- In office 2005–2009

Personal details
- Party: Party Alliance Our Moldova
- Other political affiliations: Electoral Bloc Democratic Moldova

Vasile Pîntea is a Moldovan politician. He served as a member of the Parliament of Moldova (2005–2009).
