= Slobozia-Șirăuți =

- Village
- Location within Moldova
- Coordinates: 48°14′33″N 26°52′21″E
- Country: Moldova
- District: Briceni District

Government
  - Mayor: Vasilii Gorbuli (PDM)

Population (2014 census)
  - Total: 992
- Time zone: UTC+2 (EET)
  - Summer (DST): UTC+3 (EEST)

Slobozia-Șirăuți is a village in Briceni District, Moldova.
