= Constantin Osoianu =

Bessarabian politician

Member of the Moldovan Parliament
- In office 11 November 1917 – 27 November 1918

Personal details
- Born: Horești, Fălești

Constantin Osoianu (born 1885 in Horeşti) was a Bessarabian politician.

== Biography ==
He served as Member of the Moldovan Parliament (1917–1918).

== Gallery ==
Moldovan stamp, 1998

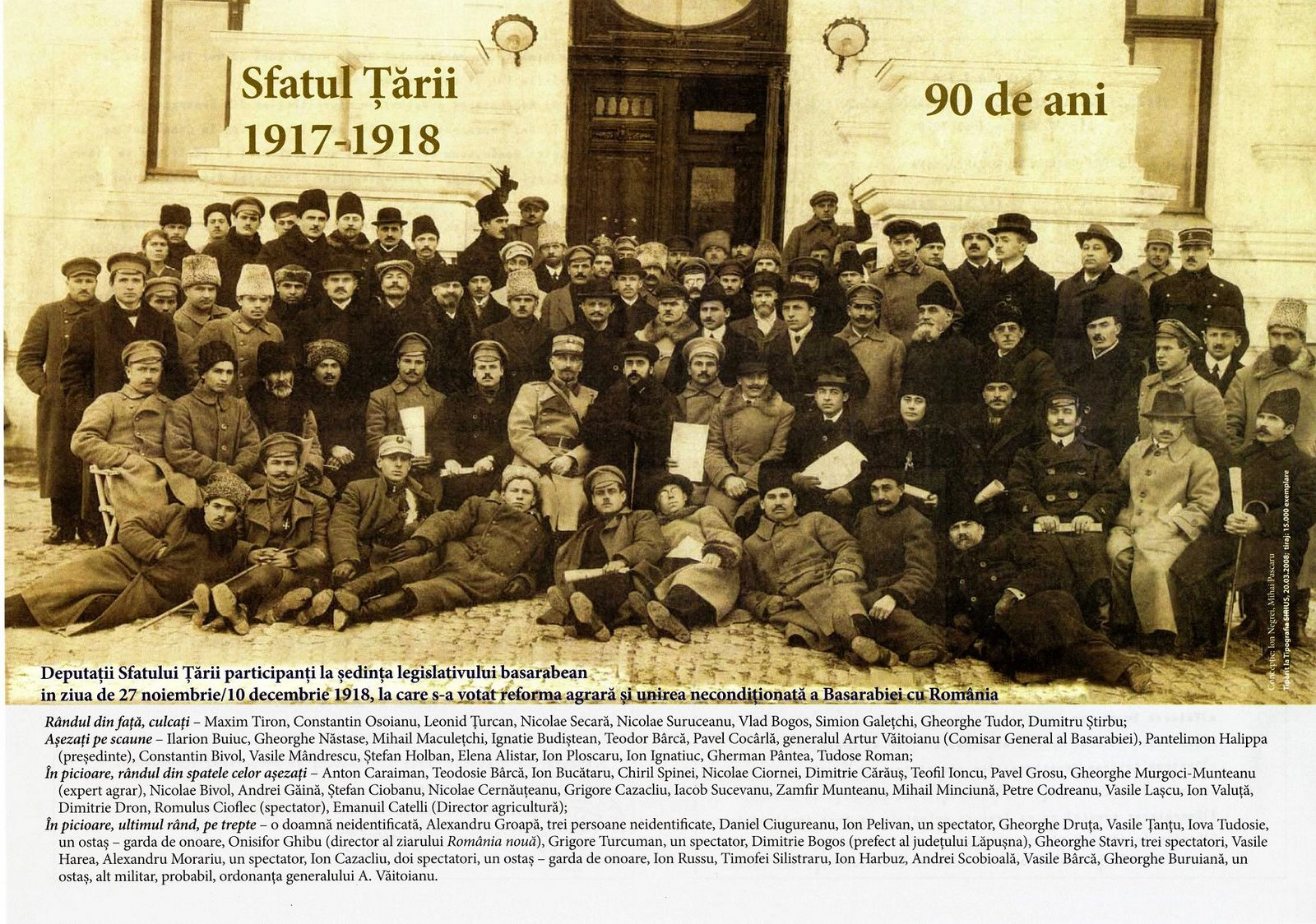
Sfatul Țării Palace, 10 December 1918
