= Mihail Barbulat =

Moldovan politician (born 1971)

Moldovan Ambassador to Hungary, Slovenia, Bosnia and Herzegovina and Croatia
- Incumbent
- Assumed office 18 December 2024
- President: Maia Sandu
- Prime Minister: Dorin Recean; Alexandru Munteanu; Eugen Osmochescu (acting); Vasile Tofan
- Preceded by: Oleg Țulea

Minister of Culture and Tourism
- In office 10 June 2009 – 25 September 2009
- President: Vladimir Voronin; Mihai Ghimpu (acting)
- Prime Minister: Zinaida Greceanîi; Vitalie Pîrlog (acting)
- Preceded by: Artur Cozma
- Succeeded by: Boris Focșa (as Minister of Culture)

Moldovan Ambassador to Turkey, United Arab Emirates, Egypt, Kuwait, Qatar, Libya, Saudi Arabia and Oman
- In office 24 June 2005 – 28 May 2008
- President: Vladimir Voronin
- Prime Minister: Vasile Tarlev; Zinaida Greceanîi
- Preceded by: Victor Țvircun
- Succeeded by: Sergiu Stati

Personal details
- Born: 19 February 1971 (age 55) Chișinău, Moldavian SSR, Soviet Union
- Education: Moldova State University

Mihail Barbulat (born 19 February 1971) is a Moldovan politician and diplomat. He served as the Minister of Culture of Moldova in 2009.
