= Valeriu Guma =

Moldovan politician (born 1964)

Member of the Moldovan Parliament
- In office 14 August 2009 – 20 February 2014
- Succeeded by: Valeriu Tabuica
- Parliamentary group: Democratic Party
- In office 24 March 2005 – 5 April 2009
- Parliamentary group: Democratic Party
- In office 21 April 1998 – 20 March 2001
- Parliamentary group: For a Democratic and Prosperous Moldova Bloc

Personal details
- Party: Democratic Party; Alliance for European Integration (2009–present)

Valeriu Guma (born 29 October 1964) is a Moldovan politician.

== Biography ==
He has been a member of the Parliament of Moldova since 2009.
