= Ion Ciontoloi =

Moldovan politician (born 1958)

Member of the Moldovan Parliament
- In office 2005–2007

Governor of Căuşeni District
- Incumbent
- Assumed office 2007

Personal details
- Born: July 7, 1958 (age 67) Ermoclia
- Party: Liberal Democratic Party
- Other political affiliations: Party Alliance Our Moldova; Electoral Bloc Democratic Moldova

Ion Ciontoloi (born July 7, 1958, in Ermoclia) is a Moldovan politician.

== Biography ==
Ion Ciontoloi was born on July 7, 1958, in Ermoclia, Ştefan Vodă District. He is the son of Danil Ciontoloi (born May 27, 1921 în Volintiri, Ştefan Vodă District) and Ana Ciontoloi. Ion Ciontoloi served as member of the Parliament of Moldova (2005–2007) and has been the governor of Căuşeni District since 2007.

In July 2010, Ion Ciontoloi became a member of the Liberal Democratic Party of Moldova.
