= Tatiana Șevciuc =

Moldovan economist (born 1983)

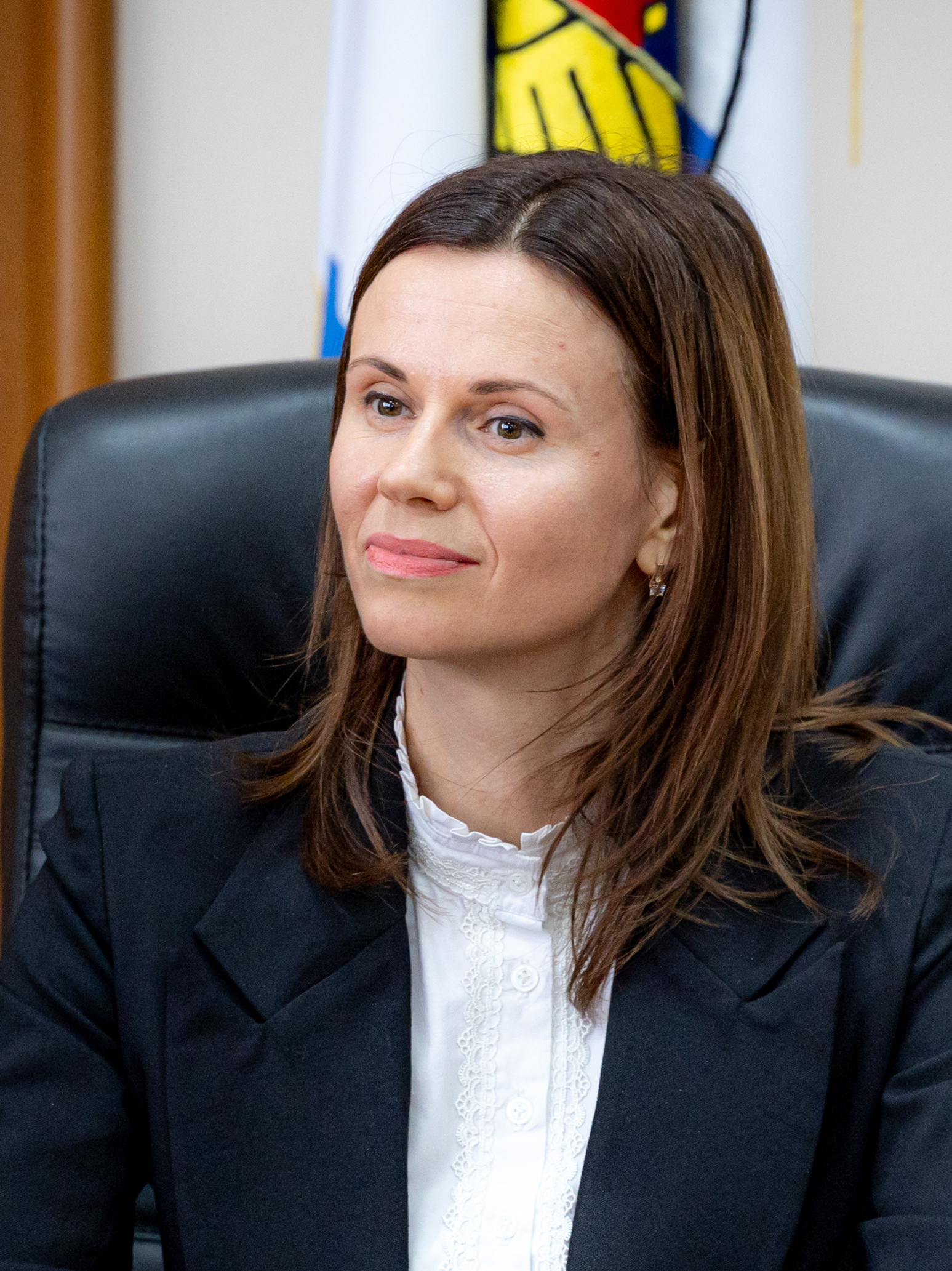
- Șevciuc in 2024

President of the Court of Accounts
- Incumbent
- Assumed office 21 March 2024
- Deputy: Viorel Chetraru
- Preceded by: Marian Lupu

Personal details
- Born: May 20, 1983 (age 43) Volintiri, Moldavian SSR, Soviet Union (now Moldova)
- Education: State Agrarian University of Moldova; Academy of Economic Studies of Moldova

Tatiana Șevciuc (born 20 May 1983) is a Moldovan economist, President of the Court of Accounts of Moldova.

== Personal life ==
Besides speaking her native Romanian, Șevciuc speaks English, French, and Russian.
