= Sergiu Stati =

Moldovan politician (born 1961)

Member of the Moldovan Parliament
- In office 24 December 2010 – 9 March 2019
- Parliamentary group: Party of Communists; Democratic Party
- In office 24 March 2005 – 31 October 2006
- Succeeded by: Ștefan Grigoriev
- Parliamentary group: Party of Communists

Moldovan Ambassador to Turkey
- In office 19 May 2009 – 11 November 2009
- President: Vladimir Voronin; Mihai Ghimpu (acting)
- Prime Minister: Zinaida Greceanîi; Vitalie Pîrlog (acting); Vladimir Filat
- Preceded by: Mihail Barbulat
- Succeeded by: Igor Bolboceanu

Domestic Policy Advisor to the President
- In office 15 October 2008 – 19 May 2009
- President: Vladimir Voronin
- Preceded by: Mark Tkachuk
- Succeeded by: Ștefan Urîtu

Moldovan Ambassador to Ukraine
- In office 31 October 2006 – 15 October 2008
- President: Vladimir Voronin
- Prime Minister: Vasile Tarlev; Zinaida Greceanîi
- Preceded by: Mihail Laur
- Succeeded by: Nicolae Gumenîi

Deputy Minister of Foreign Affairs
- In office 11 February 2004 – 24 March 2005
- President: Vladimir Voronin
- Prime Minister: Vasile Tarlev
- Minister: Andrei Stratan

Personal details
- Born: 7 September 1961 (age 64)

Sergiu Stati (born 7 September 1961) is a Moldovan politician and diplomat. He was elected Member of the Moldovan Parliament twice and served as the Moldovan Ambassador to Ukraine between 2006 and 2009.
