= Alexandru Lipcan =

Moldovan politician

Member of the Moldovan Parliament
- In office 2005–2009

Personal details
- Other political affiliations: Electoral Bloc Democratic Moldova

Alexandru Lipcan is a Moldovan politician.

== Biography ==
He served as member of the Parliament of Moldova (2005–2009).
