= Grinăuți-Moldova =

- Commune
- Location in Moldova
- Coordinates: 48°17′N 27°27′E
- Country: Moldova
- District: Ștefan Vodă District
- Elevation: 709 ft (216 m)

Population (2014)
  - Total: 2,062
- Time zone: UTC+2 (EET)
  - Summer (DST): UTC+3 (EEST)
- Postal code: MD-7123
- Area code: +373 271

Grinăuți-Moldova is a commune in Ocnița District, Moldova. It is composed of three villages: Grinăuți-Moldova, Grinăuți-Raia and Rediul Mare station.

== Notable people ==
- Marcel Răducan
- Andrei Sangheli
