= Ivan Banari =

Moldovan politician (born 1955)

Member of the Moldovan Parliament
- In office 2005–2009

Personal details
- Born: 13 November 1955 (age 70) Coşcodeni
- Party: Electoral Bloc Democratic Moldova

Ivan Banari (born November 13, 1955, Coşcodeni) is a Moldovan politician.

== Biography ==
He served as member of the Parliament of Moldova (2005–2009).
