= Horești, Fălești =

Horești
- Commune
- Location in Moldova
- Coordinates: 47°25′N 27°34′E
- Country: Moldova
- District: Fălești District

Population (2014)
  - Total: 1,056
- Time zone: UTC+2 (EET)
  - Summer (DST): UTC+3 (EEST)

Horești is a commune in Fălești District, Moldova, near the border with Romania, about 25 km (16 mi) to the north of Iași. It is composed of three villages: Horești, Lucăceni and Unteni.

== Notable people ==
- Constantin Osoianu
- Valentina Buliga
