= Mihail Silistraru =

Moldovan politician

Member of the Moldovan Parliament
- In office 22 April 2009 – 28 August 2009
- Parliamentary group: Our Moldova Alliance

Personal details
- Party: Alliance Our Moldova; Alliance for European Integration (2009–present)

Mihail Silistraru is a Moldovan politician.

== Biography ==
He was a member of the Parliament of Moldova.
