= Court of Accounts (Moldova) =

Court of Accounts of Moldova
- Curtea de Conturi a Republicii Moldova
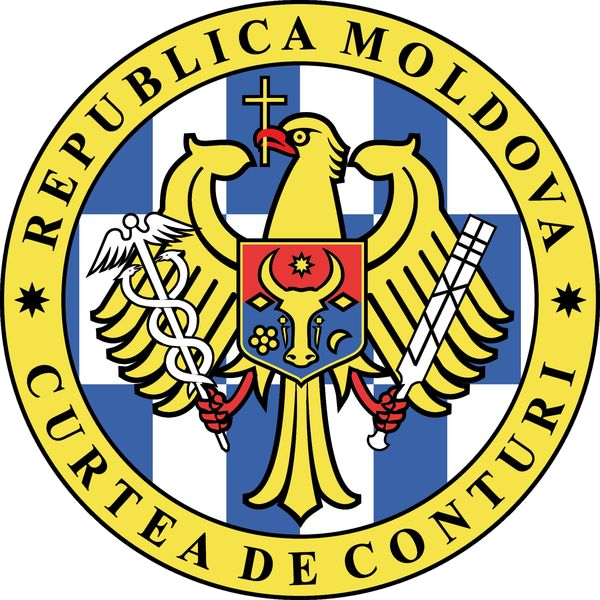

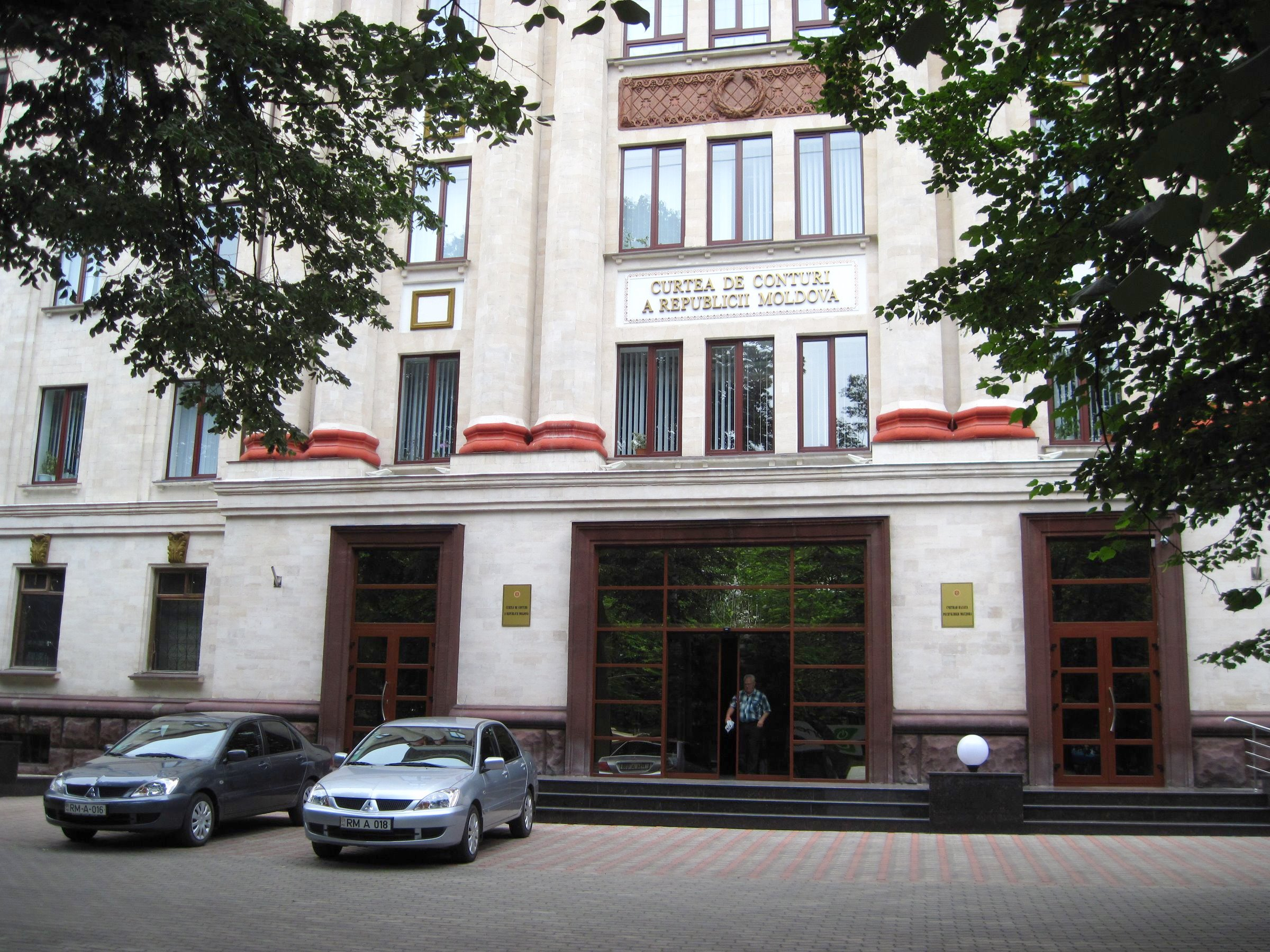
- Headquarters in Chișinău
- Established: 8 December 1994; 30 years ago
- Jurisdiction: Constitution of Moldova
- Location: 69 Stephen the Great Avenue, Chișinău
- Appeals to: Parliament of Moldova
- Language: Romanian
- Website: ccrm.md

President of the Court of Accounts
- Currently: Tatiana Șevciuc
- Since: 21 March 2024

The Court of Accounts of Moldova (Romanian: Curtea de Conturi a Republicii Moldova) is the supreme public external audit institution, according to the provisions of the Law of the Court of Accounts no. 261-XVI, dated 5 December 2008, and is the only state public authority that controls the formation, management and use of public financial resources and management of public property by carrying out external audit in the public sector, confirming the compliance of the Republic of Moldova with the international standards on the best public external audit practices.

The court was established in 1994; the same year, it became member of international organizations EUROSAI and INTOSAI. It is located at 69 Ștefan cel Mare Boulevard, Chișinău, in a building inaugurated in 2009.

== Presidents ==
№	Name	Portrait	Office term	
№	Name	Portrait	Start of term	End of term
1	Ion Ciubuc		27 December 1994	24 January 1997
2	Vasile Cozma		17 July 1997	31 July 2000
3	Vasile Pentelei		31 July 2000	30 September 2004
4	Ala Popescu		16 December 2004	21 April 2011
5	Serafim Urechean		21 April 2011	29 July 2016
6	Veaceslav Untilă		29 July 2016	7 February 2019
7	Marian Lupu		7 February 2019	21 March 2024
8	Tatiana Șevciuc		21 March 2024	Incumbent
