= Vasile Grozav =

Moldovan politician (born 1950)

Member of the Moldovan Parliament
- In office 2005–2009

Personal details
- Party: Party Alliance Our Moldova
- Other political affiliations: Electoral Bloc Democratic Moldova

Vasile Grozav (born 1950) is a Moldovan politician.

== Biography ==
He served as member of the Parliament of Moldova (2005–2009).
