= Ion Pleșca =

Moldovan politician (born 1957)

Member of the Moldovan Parliament
- In office 24 March 2005 – 28 December 2010
- Parliamentary group: Our Moldova Alliance

Personal details
- Born: Lopatnic, Moldavian SSR, Soviet Union
- Party: Alliance Our Moldova; Alliance for European Integration (2009–present)

Ion Pleșca (born 1 September 1957) is a Moldovan judge and former politician.

== Biography ==
He was a member of the Parliament of Moldova until 2010.
