= Pereni =

- Commune
- Location within Moldova
- Coordinates: 47.6544444444°N 28.7791666667°E
- Country: Moldova
- District: Rezina District

Population (2014)
  - Total: 576
- Time zone: UTC+2 (EET)
  - Summer (DST): UTC+3 (EEST)

Pereni is a commune in Rezina District, Moldova. It is composed of two villages, Pereni and Roșcani.
