= Dumitru Ivanov (politician) =

Moldovan politician (1946–2021)

Member of the Moldovan Parliament
- In office 2005–2009

Personal details
- Born: 1 January 1946
- Died: 4 June 2021 (aged 75)
- Other political affiliations: Electoral Bloc Democratic Moldova

Dumitru Ivanov (1 January 1946 – 4 June 2021) was a Moldovan politician.

== Biography ==
He served as member of the Parliament of Moldova (2005–2009).
