= Horești, Ialoveni =

Horești
- Village
- Location within Moldova
- Coordinates: 46.8266666667°N 28.8719444444°E
- Country: Moldova
- District: Ialoveni

Government
  - Mayor: Petru Cigoreanu (PLDM)
- Elevation: 78 m (256 ft)

Population (2014 census)
  - Total: 3,511
- Time zone: UTC+2 (EET)
  - Summer (DST): UTC+3 (EEST)

Horești is a village in Ialoveni District, Moldova.
