= Fundurii Vechi =

- Village
- Location in Moldova
- Coordinates: 47°44′28″N 27°42′52″E
- Country: Moldova
- District: Glodeni District

Government
  - Mayor: Anatolie Gnatiuc (PN)

Population (2014 census)
  - Total: 2,764
- Time zone: UTC+2 (EET)
  - Summer (DST): UTC+3 (EEST)

Fundurii Vechi is a village in Glodeni District, Moldova. The first document attesting its existence dates to 18 April 1581.

== Demographics ==
According to the 2014 Moldovan census, Fundurii Vechi had a population of 2,764 residents. The village covers an area of 35.2 km², resulting in a population density of about 78.5 inhabitants per square kilometer as of 2014. Over the decade leading up to the census, the population declined slightly by 2.5%.

Women made up a slight majority at 52% of the population, compared to 48% men. The age distribution showed that 16.9% of residents were under 15 years old, 71.5% were of working age (15–64), and 11.6% were aged 65 and older.

All residents lived in rural settings. Most inhabitants (98.7%) were born in Moldova, with a small minority (1.3%) from other Commonwealth of Independent States countries.

The population was predominantly Moldovans by ethnicity (96.3%), with small numbers of Romanians (2.2%), Ukrainians (0.8%), and Russians (0.7%). The majority of residents spoke Moldovan as their native language (93.4%), followed by Romanian (5.3%), Russian (0.7%), and Ukrainian (0.6%). Religious affiliation was overwhelmingly Orthodox (99.7%), with only a small portion (0.3%) adhering to other faiths.

== Administration and local government ==
Fundurii Vechi is governed by a local council composed of eleven members. The most recent local elections, in November 2023, resulted in the following composition: 7 councillors from Our Party, 2 councillors from the Party of Development and Consolidation of Moldova, and 2 councillors from the Party of Action and Solidarity. In the same elections, the candidate from Our Party, Anatolie Gnatiuc, was elected as mayor by a 58.96% majority.

== Notable people ==
- Igor Klipii
