= Fundurii Noi =

- Village
- Location within Moldova
- Coordinates: 47.7516666667°N 27.6472222222°E
- Country: Moldova
- District: Glodeni

Government
  - Mayor: Vasili Colenco (PDCM)

Population (2014 census)
  - Total: 664
- Time zone: UTC+2 (EET)
  - Summer (DST): UTC+3 (EEST)

Fundurii Noi is a village in Glodeni District, Moldova.

== Demographics ==
According to the 2014 Moldovan census, Fundurii Noi had a population of 664 residents. The village covers an area of 18.7 km², resulting in a population density of approximately 35.5 inhabitants per square kilometer. Between the 2004 and 2014 censuses, the population declined by 4.1%. Women made up a slight majority of the population at 51.4%, while men accounted for 48.6%. The age distribution showed that 15.1% of residents were children (0–14 years), 66.7% were of working age (15–64 years), and 18.2% were elderly (65+ years). Nearly all residents (97.3%) were born in Moldova, with a small minority (2.7%) born in other Commonwealth of Independent States countries. The ethnic composition was predominantly Ukrainians (67%), followed by Moldovans (27.5%) and Russians (5.5%). Ukrainian was the most commonly reported native language (65.8%), while 22.4% spoke Moldovan and 11.8% Russian. The vast majority of the population (97%) identified as Orthodox Christians, with 3% adhering to other religions.

== Administration and local government ==
Fundurii Noi is governed by a local council composed of nine members. The most recent local elections, in November 2023, resulted in the following composition: 6 councillors from the Party of Development and Consolidation of Moldova and 3 councillors from the Party of Socialists of the Republic of Moldova. The Revival Party and the Chance Political Party also ran, but did not elect councillors. In the same elections, the candidate from the Party of Development and Consolidation of Moldova, Vasili Colenco, was elected as mayor by a majority of 73.28% votes.
