= Vasile Balan =

Moldovan politician (1950–2012)

Member of the Moldovan Parliament
- In office 24 March 2005 – 28 December 2010
- Parliamentary group: Our Moldova Alliance

Personal details
- Born: Teleșeu, Moldavian SSR, Soviet Union
- Party: Alliance Our Moldova; Alliance for European Integration (2009–2012)

Vasile Balan (21 June 1950 – 14 June 2012) was a Moldovan politician.

== Biography ==
He has been a member of the Parliament of Moldova since 2009.
