= Codreanca =

- Commune
- Location within Moldova
- Coordinates: 47.2811111111°N 28.5852777778°E
- Country: Moldova
- District: Strășeni

Population (2014)
  - Total: 2,236
- Time zone: UTC+2 (EET)
  - Summer (DST): UTC+3 (EEST)

Codreanca is a commune in Strășeni District, Moldova. It is composed of two villages, Codreanca and Lupa-Recea.
