= Editura Universul =

Editura Universul is a book publishing company located in Chișinău, Moldova. It was established in 1933, when the area was part of Greater Romania. Universul is the oldest such firm in the country, and among the largest.
