= Anatolie Golea =

Anatolie Golea OR
- Born: 10 June 1965 (age 60); Clocuşna, Moldavian SSR, Soviet Union
- Occupation: Journalist
- Awards: Order of the Republic (Moldova)

Anatolie Golea (born 10 June 1965) is a journalist from the Republic of Moldova. He was a founder of INFOTAG newsagency.

== Awards ==
- Order of the Republic (Moldova) – highest state distinctions (2009)
