= Dumitru Diacov =

President of the Moldovan Parliament from 1998 to 2001

Dumitru Diacov OR
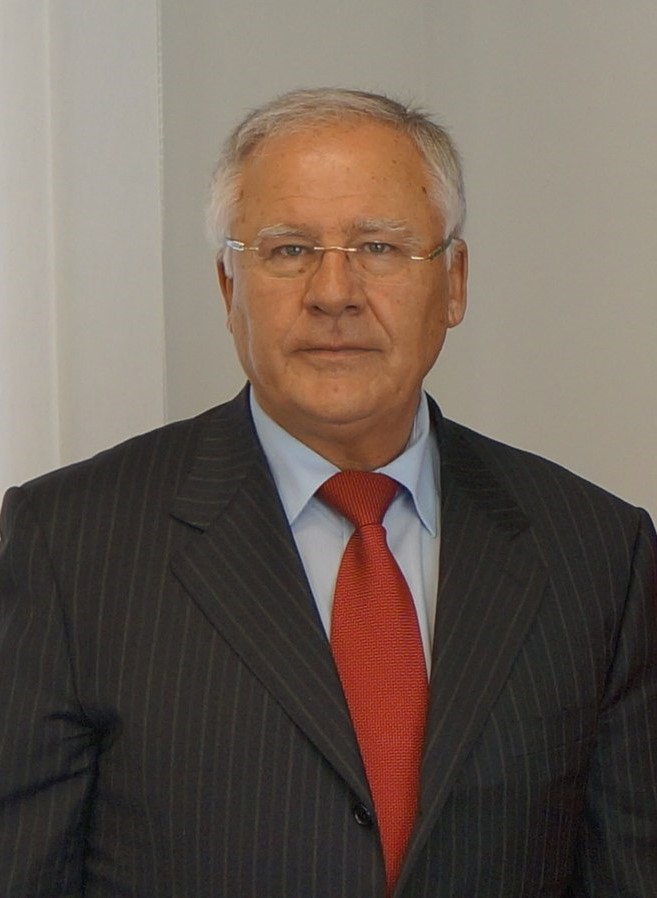
- Diacov in 2014

4th President of the Moldovan Parliament
- In office 23 April 1998 – 20 March 2001
- President: Petru Lucinschi
- Prime Minister: Ion Ciubuc; Ion Sturza; Dumitru Braghiș
- Preceded by: Dumitru Moțpan
- Succeeded by: Eugenia Ostapciuc

Member of the Moldovan Parliament
- In office 29 July 2009 – 23 July 2021
- Parliamentary group: Democratic Party
- In office 22 March 2005 – 22 April 2009
- Parliamentary group: Democratic Moldova Electoral Bloc; Democratic Party
- In office 27 February 1994 – 20 March 2001
- Parliamentary group: Democratic Agrarian Party; Democratic Party

President of the Democratic Party
- In office 8 February 1997 – 19 July 2009
- Succeeded by: Marian Lupu

Vice President of the Moldovan Parliament
- In office 22 July 1995 – 23 April 1998
- President: Mircea Snegur; Petru Lucinschi
- Prime Minister: Andrei Sangheli; Ion Ciubuc
- Speaker: Petru Lucinschi; Dumitru Moțpan
- Preceded by: Nicolae Andronic
- Succeeded by: Iurie Roșca

Personal details
- Born: 10 February 1952 (age 74) Kargapolye, Russian SFSR, Soviet Union
- Party: Democratic Party (1997-2022); Democratic Agrarian Party (1991-1997)
- Other political affiliations: Alliance for European Integration; Communist Party
- Education: Moldova State University; Belarusian State University
- Profession: Journalist

Dumitru Diacov (born 10 February 1952) is a Moldovan politician, former President of the Moldovan Parliament, member of the Parliament of Moldova in several consecutive terms since the year 2005 and formerly between 1994 and 2001. He was the leader of the Democratic Party of Moldova from 1997 to 2009, when he was succeeded as party chairman by Marian Lupu.

== Biography ==
Dumitru Diacov was born on 10 February 1952 in Kargapolye, Kurgan Oblast (Russia), in a family of deportees from Bessarabia. In 1969, he became a student at the Faculty of Letters, Journalism Department, of the Moldova State University from Chișinău. In 1974, Dumitru Diacov graduated from Belarusian State University and then worked for TeleRadio-Moldova. After 1984, he worked as correspondent in Chişinău for Komsomolskaya Pravda and then for Komsomol and CPSU in Moscow (1986–1989). Between 1989 and 1993, he worked for Information Telegraph Agency of Russia in Bucharest.

Dumitru Diacov was a Moldovan MP (1994 – 2001, 2005 - May 2009, July 2009 – 2010) and the president of the Moldovan Parliament (23 April 1998 – 20 March 2001).

His leadership of the Democratic Party of Moldova lasted from 1997 until June 2009, when he was named honorary president. In November 2022, when the Democratic Party was turned into the European Social Democratic Party, he opposed this change and did not join the new party. Due to this, his title of honorary president was revoked.
