= Valentina Golban =

Moldovan politician (born 1962)

Valentina Stratan-Golban

Member of the Moldovan Parliament
- In office 17 March 2005 – 9 March 2019
- Parliamentary group: Democratic Party

Personal details
- Born: Peresecina, Moldavian SSR, Soviet Union
- Other political affiliations: Electoral Bloc Democratic Moldova

Valentina Stratan-Golban (born 17 September 1962) is a Moldovan politician.

She served as member of the Parliament of Moldova from 2005 to 2009.
