= Nae-Simion Pleșca =

Moldovan politician

Nae-Simion Pleşca

Member of the Moldovan Parliament
- Incumbent
- Assumed office 2010

Personal details
- Born: 13 September 1957 (age 68) Bălceana
- Party: Liberal Democratic Party; Alliance for European Integration (2010–present)

Nae-Simion Pleşca (born 13 September 1955 or 1957) is a politician from Moldova. He has been a member of the Parliament of Moldova since 2010.
