= Serafim Urechean =

Mayor of Chișinău from 1994 to 2005

Serafim Urechean OR
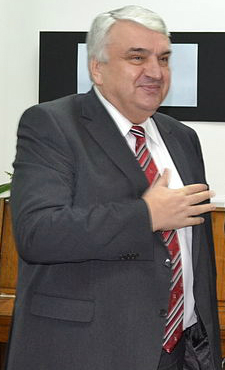
- Urechean in 2014

President of the Court of Accounts
- In office 21 April 2011 – 28 July 2016
- Preceded by: Ala Popescu
- Succeeded by: Veaceslav Untilă

First Vice President of the Moldovan Parliament
- In office 28 August 2009 – 24 December 2010
- President: Vladimir Voronin; Mihai Ghimpu (acting)
- Prime Minister: Zinaida Greceanîi; Vitalie Pîrlog (acting); Vladimir Filat
- Speaker: Mihai Ghimpu
- Preceded by: Vladimir Țurcan
- Succeeded by: Vladimir Plahotniuc

Member of the Moldovan Parliament
- In office 22 March 2005 – 24 December 2010
- Parliamentary group: Our Moldova Alliance
- In office 10 March 1990 – 24 March 1994
- Constituency: Anenii Noi

Mayor of Chișinău
- In office 9 August 1994 – 18 April 2005
- Preceded by: Nicolae Costin
- Succeeded by: Mihai Furtună (acting)

Personal details
- Born: 2 February 1950 (age 76) Larga, Moldavian SSR, Soviet Union
- Citizenship: Moldova; Romania
- Party: Our Moldova Alliance (2003–2011); Alliance for European Integration (2009–2010)
- Other political affiliations: Communist Party (Before 1991); Alliance for Democracy and Reforms (1998–2001); Independents' Alliance (2001–2003)
- Spouse: Tatiana Marcenco
- Profession: Construction engineer

Serafim Urechean (born 2 February 1950) is a Moldovan politician. He held the position of general mayor of Chișinău municipality (1994–2005) and interim prime minister of the Republic of Moldova (5 – 17 February 1999). He was the chairman of the party Our Moldova Alliance (2003–2011), first deputy chairman of the Parliament of the Republic of Moldova (2009–2010) and president of the Court of Accounts of the Republic of Moldova (2011–2016).

== Biography ==
Urechean was born on 2 February 1950 at Larga, Briceni, in the Moldovan SSR, in a peasant's family.

=== Education and career ===
After graduation of the Middle School in his native village, he continued his education at the Polytechnic Institute in Chișinău, at the Faculty of Civil and Industrial Engineering (1969–1974), which he graduated from in 1974, obtaining the qualification of construction engineer. He was a member of the Communist Party of the Soviet Union.

In the same year, the compulsory military service began in the Soviet army, during which, for two years, he participated, directly, in the construction of the famous car plant in Tolyatti, Russia (1974–1976).

After demobilization, in 1976, he continued his professional activity in the native district – Briceni as an engineer within the Constructions Enterprise Briceni (1976–1978). In this capacity, he works on the construction sites of the Briceni district. He led construction works on several social-economic sites.

In 1978 he was co-opted within the political structures of Briceni district. He held the position of Head of Department for Industrial and Constructions Development, Second Secretary of the District Committee of the Communist Party of Moldova in Briceni (1978–1983).

In 1983–1985, he studied at the Higher Party School of Leningrad, Russia. Returning to the Republic of Moldova, he worked at the Central Committee of the Communist Party of Moldova. He holds, for a short time, the position of inspector and, in the same year, he was transferred as the second secretary at the district committee Anenii Noi of the CPM. In November 1985 he was elected as Chairman of the District Executive Committee of the Anenii Noi by the People's Deputies (1985–1987).

He then worked for the Federation of Independent Trade Unions of the Republic of Moldova (1987–1994), first as vice president, then as first vice president and finally as president. In parallel, for a period, he was an MP at the Parliament of the Republic of Moldova (1991–1994). In parallel, for a period, he was an MP at the Parliament of the Republic of Moldova (1991–1994). He led the faction of independent MPs.

On 9 August 1994, by decree of the President of the Republic of Moldova, he was appointed as General Mayor of Chișinău Municipality. He was re-elected successively as mayor in the 1999 and 2003. He holds the position of mayor of Chișinău between 1994 and 2005. Since 23 May 1999 the position was called differently as a general mayor.

He is a titular member of the Congress of Local and Regional Powers of the Council of Europe, president of the Federation of Local and Regional Powers of the Republic of Moldova (since 1996). He was president of the Chess Federation of the Republic of Moldova between 1995 and 2005. The president of the Moldavian branch of the International Academy of Engineering.

As mayor of Chișinău municipality he directly supported and contributed to the organization of several international forums and conferences in Chișinău under the auspice of UN, UNESCO, NATO, TACIS, etc. He is also co-author of the monograph on Scientific and Technological Achievements Related to the Development of European Cities, NATO. ASI Series. Vol. 9.

On 5 and 17 February 1999 he held the position of interim prime minister of the Republic of Moldova. President Petru Lucinschi delegated him as a candidate for the position of prime minister, but he did not get the support of the parliament, he withdrew his candidacy.

On 21 December 1999, by the Decree no. 1263 (art. 3) of the President of the Republic of Moldova, Petru Lucinschi, was declared that Serafim Urechean, in his capacity as general mayor of Chișinău municipality, would become a member of the ex officio Government. He held the position of member of the government by the time of adoption of the Law no. 806-XV of 5 February 2002, for amending and completing the Statute of Chișinău municipality, when he was suspended of being a member of the Government of the Republic of Moldova.

Serafim Urechean was very proactive in the political life. In 2001 he became the President of the Social-Political Movement Independents' Alliance of Moldova, in 2003 he became the co-president of the Party Our Moldova Alliance (in 2005–2011 he became the president), and in 2004–2005 he was the leader of the Electoral Bloc Democratic Moldova.

At the parliamentary elections of 6 March 2005, Electoral Bloc Democratic Moldova, led by the Chișinău mayor Serafim Urechean, accumulated 28.53% of the votes of the participants and got 34 mandates out of 101. In accordance with article 70 of the Constitution of Moldova, "the MP position is not compliant with the any other remunerated function, except the didactic and scientific activity". On 18 April 2005, the last day of the one-month term given for the validation of the mandate, provided to decide whether to accept or reject the position for which was elected, Serafim Urechean decided to resign as mayor of Chișinău in favour of the deputy in the Parliament of the Republic Moldova.

On 21 April 2011 he was appointed for the position of the chairman of the Court of Accounts of the Republic of Moldova.

At the local elections in Chișinău held in 2015, Serafim Urechean was a candidate for the position of mayor from the part of the Liberal Democratic Party of Moldova. However, when he appeared on the talk shows during the election campaign, Urechean has stated: "I am not a member of any party, nor of the LDPM. By definition I cannot be, because I am going to chair an apolitical structure. If I become a mayor, I will remain apolitical. I am not going to join any party; I will be mayor of all the citizens of the Chișinău." During two months of election campaign he resigned from the position of the chairman of the Court of Accounts. Following the elections on 14 June 2015, Serafim Urechean has only 2.97% of the vote.

== Alliance For European Integration ==
After the July 2009 parliamentary election, alongside Vlad Filat, Mihai Ghimpu, and Marian Lupu, Serafim Urechean signed the Alliance For European Integration in a press conference on 8 August 2009.

== Personal life ==
He is married to Tatiana Marcenco and has two children.

== Distinctions ==
He is decorated with the Order of the Republic of Moldova (2000), [4] the Order "Shield of Honor", the Order "For the development of science and education", the Orders "Saint Dumitru" of the second grade, "Sergii Radonezhsky" and "Saint Stanislav", granted by the Russian Orthodox Church by the Russian Patriarch, Patriarch Alexy II.

In April 2015 he was awarded the honorary title of "Emeritus".

Political offices
Preceded by Ion Ciubuc	Prime Minister of Moldova; Acting; 1999	Succeeded by Ion Sturza
