= Our Moldova Alliance =

Our Moldova Alliance Alianță Moldova Noastră
- President: Serafim Urechean
- Founded: 19 July 2003
- Dissolved: 9 April 2011
- Merged into: Liberal Democratic Party of Moldova (PLDM)
- Headquarters: Chișinău
- Ideology: Social liberalism
- European affiliation: European Liberal Democrat and Reform Party
- International affiliation: Liberal International (observer)
- Colours: Yellow

The Our Moldova Alliance (Romanian: Partidul Alianță Moldova Noastră, English: Party Alliance Our Moldova, AMN) was a social-liberal political party in Moldova led by Serafim Urechean, former mayor of Chișinău. It merged into the Liberal Democratic Party of Moldova (PLDM) during April 2011.

== History ==
The Our Moldova Alliance was established as a party in 2003 from the merger of:

- the Social Democratic Alliance of Moldova or the Braghiș Alliance, successor of the social-political Movement "Civic Alliance for Reforms" and the Party of Social Democracy "Furnica" (Ant), was a social-democratic party established in 1997 and adopted this name in 2001. It was led by Dumitru Braghiș and absorbed the Socio-political Movement "Plai Natal" in 2002.
- the Liberal Party, a liberal party created as a merger of the Party of Rebirth and Conciliation of Moldova (1995), National Peasant Christian Democratic Party (1993) and the Social Liberal Union "Force of Moldova", the latter was being a merger of the National Liberal Party (1993) and the Social-Political Movement "For Order and Justice" (2000). Among its leaders was former president Mircea Snegur. The last party leader was Veaceslav Untila.
- the Independents' Alliance of Moldova, a party founded in 2001 by Serafim Urechean, mayor of Chișinău.
- the Popular Democratic Party of Moldova, a party established in 1997.

== Moldovan parliamentary election, 2005 ==
At the 2005 parliamentary elections, on 6 March 2005, the party was part of the Democratic Moldova Electoral Bloc with the Democratic Party of Moldova (PDM) and Social Liberal Party (PSL), which won 28.4% of the popular vote and 34 out of 101 seats. After the elections the bloc fell apart in three parliamentary groups of the constituent parties, so the Alliance formed a separate group with 23 deputies until the 2009 elections, when they won fewer seats.

== Moldovan parliamentary election, 2009 ==
At the April 2009 parliamentary elections, the Our Moldova Alliance won 11 seats. With the other opposition parties, it participated in the successful blocking of the election of a presidential candidate from the Party of Communists of the Republic of Moldova (PCRM) during the May–June 2009 presidential election, which led to new elections. At the July 2009 parliamentary election, the Our Moldova Alliance lost 4 seats, receiving a total of 7 seats. However, other opposition parties gained enough seats for a majority and the PCRM was defeated. In August 2009, the party became a political force within the Alliance For European Integration. The party lost all parliamentary representation in the 2010 parliamentary election.

== Notable members ==
Votes won by AMN in the April 2009 elections by raion and municipality

- Vasile Balan
- Leonid Bujor
- Valentin Chepteni
- Mihai Cimpoi
- Vladimir Ciobanu
- Ivan Ciontoloi
- Iurie Colesnic
- Vasile Colța
- Valeriu Cosarciuc
- Nicolai Deatovschi
- Vasile Grozav
- Ion Guțu
- Lidia Guțu
- Alexandru Oleinic
- Victor Osipov
- Vasile Pîntea
- Veaceslav Platon
- Ion Pleșca
- Mihail Silistraru
- Anatol Țăranu
- Veaceslav Untilă
- Serafim Urechean

== See also ==
- Liberalism
- Contributions to liberal theory
- Liberalism worldwide
- List of liberal parties
- Liberal democracy
- Liberalism in Moldova
