= 2005 Moldovan parliamentary election =

- 6 March 2005
- All 101 seats in Parliament; 51 seats needed for a majority
- Turnout: 68.84% (▲1.32pp)
Party	Leader	Vote %	Seats	+/–
PCRM	Vladimir Voronin	45.98	56	−15
BEMD	Serafim Urechean	28.53	34	New
PPCD	Iurie Roșca	9.07	11	0
This lists parties that won seats. See the complete results below.
Prime Minister before	Prime Minister after
Vasile Tarlev; PCRM	Vasile Tarlev; PCRM
Cabinet before	Cabinet after
First Tarlev Cabinet; PCRM	Second Tarlev Cabinet; PCRM

Parliamentary elections were held in Moldova on 6 March 2005. The result was a victory for the Party of Communists of the Republic of Moldova (PCRM), which won 56 of the 101 seats.

== Electoral system ==
The Parliament was elected by proportional representation in a single national constituency. In 2002 the electoral law was amended to change the electoral threshold, which had previously been at 3% for independent candidates and 6% for political parties and electoral blocs. For electoral blocs of two parties it was raised to 9%, and for blocs of three or more it was raised to 12%.

== Results ==
Results of the election, showing vote strength by commune.

Party	Votes	%	Seats	+/–
Party of Communists	716,336	45.98	56	–15
Electoral Bloc Democratic Moldova	444,377	28.53	34	–
Christian-Democratic People's Party	141,341	9.07	11	0
Electoral Bloc Motherland	77,490	4.97	0	0
Social Democratic Party	45,551	2.92	0	0
Republican Movement "Equality"	44,129	2.83	0	0
Party of Socio-Economic Justice	25,870	1.66	0	New
Christian Democratic Peasants' Party	21,365	1.37	0	0
Labour Union Party "Fatherland"	14,399	0.92	0	–
Centrist Union	11,702	0.75	0	New
Republican Party	592	0.04	0	New
Independents	14,676	0.94	0	0
Total	1,557,828	100.00	101	0
Valid votes	1,557,828	98.84		
Invalid/blank votes	18,251	1.16		
Total votes	1,576,079	100.00		
Registered voters/turnout	2,430,537	64.84		
Source: eDemocracy

=== Results by administrative-territorial unit ===
#	Administrative-territorial unit	Turnout	Party/electoral bloc					
#	Administrative-territorial unit	Turnout	PCRM	BMD	PPCD	BePR	PSDM	MRR
1	Chișinău	55.03%	37.97%	30.99%	14.86%	4.70%	3.04%	3.29%
2	Bălți	57.45%	40.83%	22.95%	5.37%	7.84%	3.50%	13.51%
3	Anenii Noi	68.37%	51.52%	24.21%	9.13%	3.70%	4.50%	0.68%
4	Basarabeasca	82.01%	57.49%	21.93%	3.88%	4.28%	1.90%	0.52%
5	Briceni	71.80%	50.14%	30.16%	4.56%	2.66%	1.20%	6.08%
6	Cahul	69.04%	39.08%	31.83%	14.60%	3.13%	3.11%	3.74%
7	Cantemir	78.40%	49.52%	32.58%	8.28%	1.18%	2.60%	0.12%
8	Călărași	71.55%	47.46%	34.26%	9.72%	0.82%	2.07%	0.21%
9	Căușeni	65.81%	49.05%	26.94%	9.47%	2.16%	4.71%	0.61%
10	Cimișlia	72.49%	61.09%	19.30%	8.42%	1.55%	2.64%	0.31%
11	Criuleni	67.31%	48.45%	32.92%	9.83%	0.95%	2.26%	0.29%
12	Donduseni	68.43%	55.19%	21.97%	5.36%	2.48%	2.58%	6.54%
13	Drochia	67.87%	49.92%	28.55%	5.95%	4.04%	2.58%	2.83%
14	Dubăsari	66.56%	69.04%	19.02%	3.45%	1.66%	2.64%	0.20%
15	Edineț	67.89%	48.50%	24.63%	4.25%	2.13%	1.42%	12.92%
16	Fălești	73.82%	56.45%	26.49%	4.74%	3.01%	3.02%	1.61%
17	Floresti	73.91%	54.47%	29.93%	5.15%	4.45%	1.35%	0.25%
18	Glodeni	65.36%	47.58%	28.43%	4.04%	8.31%	1.16%	1.61%
19	Hîncești	65.69%	47.97%	31.47%	9.31%	1.27%	4.30%	0.49%
20	Ialoveni	62.73%	43.74%	35.96%	12.27%	0.80%	1.88%	0.17%
21	Leova	74.49%	49.64%	33.38%	8.49%	2.00%	0.80%	0.49%
22	Nisporeni	68.71%	47.80%	31.24%	11.65%	0.88%	2.29%	0.09%
23	Ocnița	76.42%	64.03%	17.14%	3.34%	3.66%	0.93%	7.31%
24	Orhei	64.31%	41.15%	33.95%	10.24%	1.38%	5.53%	0.42%
25	Rezina	74.65%	53.24%	27.62%	8.72%	1.63%	3.95%	0.65%
26	Rîșcani	71.01%	46.17%	29.32%	5.86%	5.07%	2.38%	4.37%
27	Sîngerei	69.97%	44.63%	30.09%	5.69%	4.18%	8.91%	1.28%
28	Soroca	68.47%	51.29%	31.38%	5.06%	2.01%	2.99%	1.96%
29	Strășeni	65.96%	41.92%	33.24%	12.33%	0.91%	1.86%	0.13%
30	Șoldănești	71.55%	60.86%	21.70%	8.73%	0.90%	1.53%	0.11%
31	Ștefan Vodă	65.67%	44.52%	31.19%	11.82%	1.37%	2.08%	1.06%
32	Taraclia	71.70%	49.86%	18.54%	2.28%	12.00%	2.12%	8.30%
33	Telenești	71.96%	42.32%	38.49%	9.41%	0.68%	4.51%	0.04%
34	Ungheni	66.54%	53.30%	27.64%	6.72%	2.37%	3.27%	1.25%
35	U.T.A. Găgăuzia	60.64%	30.75%	6.09%	0.81%	51.48%	0.95%	5.34%
36	Transnistria	—	31.42%	41.59%	8.41%	6.01%	6.95%	1.49%
37	Diplomatic missions (Moldovan diaspora)	61.76%	11.61%	43.11%	32.32%	4.92%	3.82%	0.72%
Total		64.84%	45.98%	28.53%	9.07%	4.97%	2.92%	2.83%

== See also ==
- Moldovan Parliament 2005–2009
