= Marian Lupu =

Moldovan politician (born 1966)

Marian Lupu OR
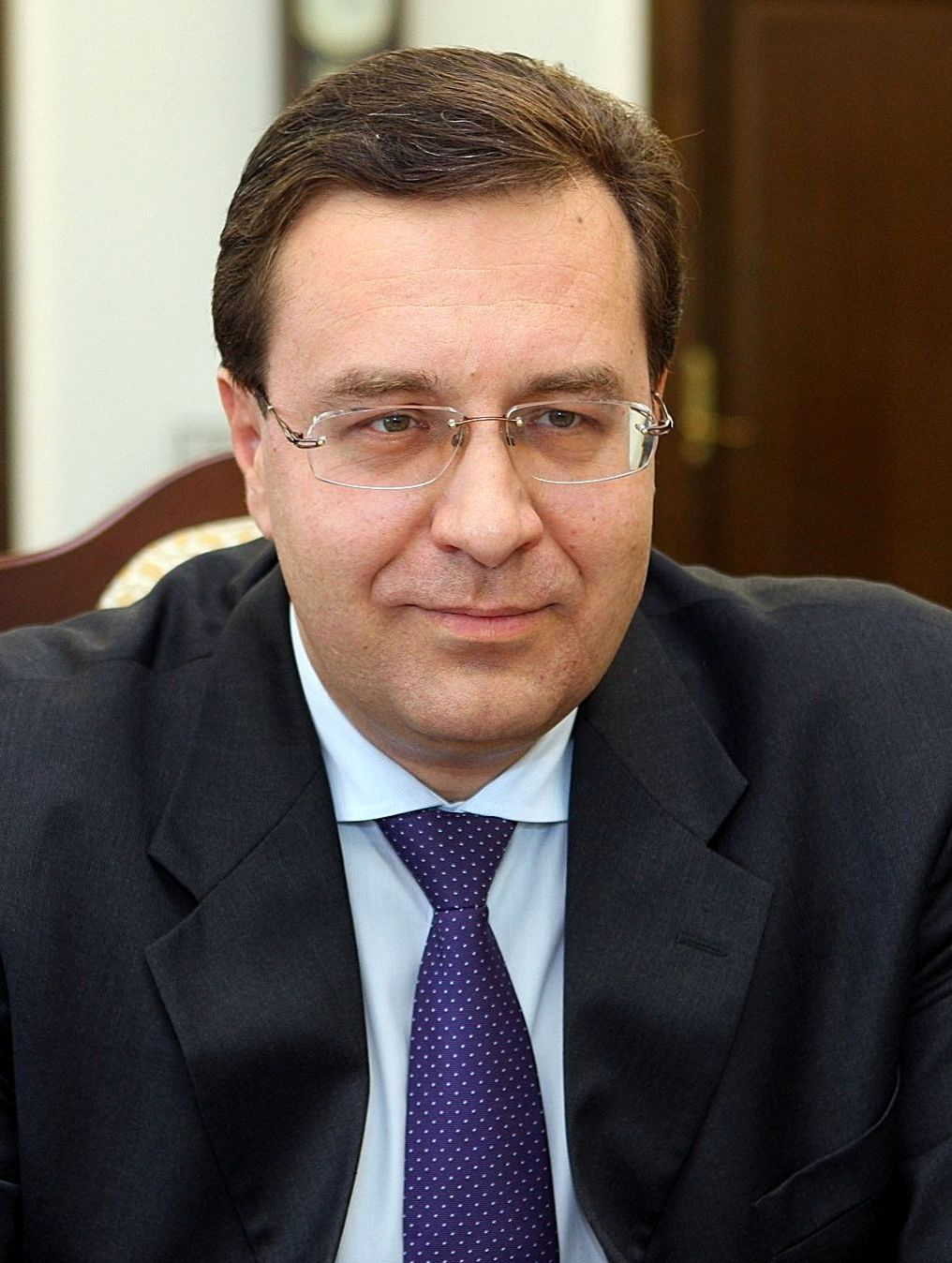
- Lupu in 2011

Acting President of Moldova
- In office 30 December 2010 – 23 March 2012
- Prime Minister: Vlad Filat
- Preceded by: Vlad Filat (acting)
- Succeeded by: Nicolae Timofti

6th and 9th President of the Moldovan Parliament
- In office 24 March 2005 – 25 April 2013
- President: Himself (acting); Nicolae Timofti
- Prime Minister: Vlad Filat
- Deputy: Vlad Plahotniuc; Liliana Palihovici
- Preceded by: Mihai Ghimpu
- Succeeded by: Liliana Palihovici (acting)
- In office 24 March 2005 – 5 May 2009
- President: Vladimir Voronin
- Prime Minister: Vasile Tarlev; Zinaida Greceanîi
- Deputy: Maria Postoico; Vadim Mișin
- Preceded by: Eugenia Ostapciuc
- Succeeded by: Vladimir Voronin

President of the Court of Accounts
- In office 7 February 2019 – 21 March 2024
- Deputy: Viorel Chetraru
- Preceded by: Veaceslav Untilă
- Succeeded by: Tatiana Șevciuc

Member of the Moldovan Parliament
- In office 24 March 2005 – 7 February 2019
- Parliamentary group: Party of Communists; Democratic Party

President of the Democratic Party
- In office 19 July 2009 – 24 December 2016
- Preceded by: Dumitru Diacov
- Succeeded by: Vlad Plahotniuc

Minister of Economy
- In office 5 August 2003 – 24 March 2005
- President: Vladimir Voronin
- Prime Minister: Vasile Tarlev
- Preceded by: Ștefan Odagiu
- Succeeded by: Valeriu Lazăr

Deputy Minister of Economy
- In office 29 May 2001 – 5 August 2003
- President: Vladimir Voronin
- Prime Minister: Vasile Tarlev
- Minister: Andrei Cucu; Ștefan Odagiu

President of the Respect Moldova Movement
- In office 12 April 2025 – 29 May 2026
- Preceded by: Eugeniu Nichiforciuc
- Succeeded by: Veaceslav Burlac

Personal details
- Born: 20 June 1966 (age 60) Bălți, Moldavian SSR, Soviet Union (now Moldova)
- Party: Communist Party of the Soviet Union (Before 1991); Party of Communists of Moldova (1993–2009); Democratic Party of Moldova (2009–2019); Respect Moldova Movement (2025–present)
- Other political affiliations: Alliance for European Integration (2009–2013)
- Children: 2
- Education: Moldova State University; Plekhanov Russian University of Economics

Marian Lupu (Romanian: [mariˈan ˈlupu]; born 20 June 1966) is a Moldovan economist and politician who was the President of the Parliament of Moldova between 2010 and 2013. From this position he served as Acting President of Moldova from 2010 until 2012.

He was the president of the party Respect Moldova Movement (MRM) from 2025 to 2026, resigning following the party review of the 2025 Moldovan parliamentary election.

== Personal life ==
Marian Lupu was born on 20 June 1966 in Bălţi. When Marian was six, the family moved to Chişinău. His father, Ilie Lupu (b. 1938), was a mathematics professor at the Moldova State University. His mother taught French language at the Nicolae Testemiţanu State University of Medicine and Pharmacy. He had been a member of Komsomol from 1980 until 1988 and a Member of Communist Party of the Soviet Union from 1988 to 1991.

Until 1983, Lupu studied at "Gheorghe Asachi" High School of Chişinău. He studied Economics at Moldova State University (until 1987) and at Plekhanov Moscow Institute of the National Economy (1987–1991) in Moscow where he obtained his PhD in Economics. Lupu also attended stages at the Institute of the International Monetary Fund in Washington, D.C. (1994) and World Trade Organization in Geneva (1996).

Besides speaking his native Romanian, Lupu speaks English, French, and Russian. Lupu was married in 1992 and has two children.

== Political career ==
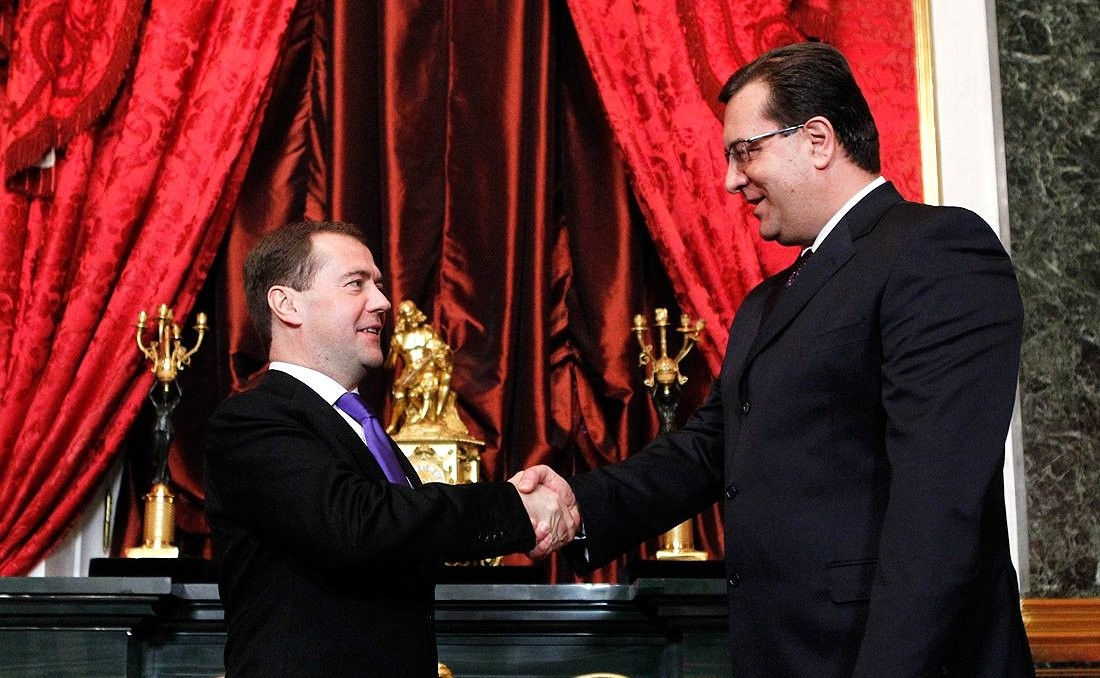
Lupu with Dmitry Medvedev.

He was named as Vice Minister of the Economy in the new Communist Tarlev cabinet in June 2001. Two years later in August 2003, Lupu was promoted to full Minister of the Economy (5 August 2003 - 24 March 2005).

After the Communists won re-election in 2005, Lupu was once again promoted, this time as Speaker of the Moldovan Parliament. Marian Lupu was Speaker of the Moldovan Parliament from March 2005 to May 2009. But in December 2008, Lupu was not included by president Vladimir Voronin in the composition of the Supreme Security Council. Lupu was a high-ranking member of the Party of Communists of the Republic of Moldova and was considered to be a leading candidate to become the next Prime Minister after Zinaida Greceanîi stepped down; however, shortly before the second (unsuccessful) attempt to elect the next president on 3 June 2009, he left the PCRM, stating that it was not possible to reform the PCRM from within. Subsequently, he was offered membership and even leadership in the Democratic Party of Moldova, which had not cleared the electoral threshold in the first elections in 2009.

After July 2009 parliamentary election, alongside Vlad Filat, Mihai Ghimpu, and Serafim Urechean, Marian Lupu signed the Alliance For European Integration in a press-conference on 8 August 2009.

He was the candidate of the Alliance For European Integration for President of Moldova up until the election of president Nicolae Timofti on 16 March 2012.

On 25 April 2013 Marian Lupu was sacked from position of President of Moldovan Parliament with 76 of 101 votes (communists, liberal-democrats, socialists and some liberal-reformators).

On 12 April 2025, Lupu became the president of the party Respect Moldova Movement (MRM), succeeding Eugeniu Nichiforciuc, who continued his activity within the party.

== Political views ==
=== Language and identity ===
In controversy over ethnic and linguistic identity in Moldova, Marian Lupu identifies himself as an ethnic Moldovan and supported retention of "Moldovan language" in Constitution as state language of Moldova. Though in 2010, in the TV talk-show "În profunzime" on ProTV Chișinău, Marian Lupu stated: "From a scientific point of view, I speak Romanian, from a political point of view – I speak Moldovan!”. After two years, in the same talk-show Lupu stated: "I changed my mind. Scientifically is not Romanian anymore, as I said previously, but the Moldovan [language].” Lupu supports the idea of the existence of the Moldovan people and Moldovan nation and the idea that Moldova is a distinct entity apart from Romania.

=== Others ===
In 2010 Lupu stated that "It is a pride for Moldova that its soldiers marched on the Red Square” in the 2010 Moscow Victory Day Parade, going against other politicians who criticized the presence of the Moldovan National Army's Honor Guard Company.

Political offices
| Preceded by Vlad Filat; Acting | President of Moldova; Acting; 2010–2012 | Succeeded by Nicolae Timofti |
