= European Social Democratic Party =

Centre-left political party in Moldova

European Social Democratic Party Partidul Social Democrat European
- Abbreviation: PSDE
- President: Vasile Bumacov
- First Vice Presidents: Ion Sula; Alexandr Cauia
- Founder: Dumitru Diacov
- Founded: 8 February 1997
- Headquarters: 8A Maria Cebotari Street, Chișinău
- Youth wing: Democratic Youth
- Membership (2019): ▼5,385
- Ideology: Social democracy Left-wing populism Pro-Europeanism
- Political position: Centre-left
- European affiliation: Party of European Socialists (associate)
- Continental affiliation: Forum of Socialists of the CIS Countries
- International affiliation: Socialist International; Progressive Alliance
- Colours: Blue Red
- Slogan: Moldova Altfel ('Moldova Differently')
- Parliament: 0 / 101
- District Presidents: 2 / 32

Website
- Official website

The European Social Democratic Party (Romanian: Partidul Social Democrat European, PSDE), formerly the Democratic Party of Moldova, is a centre-left, populist social democratic political party in Moldova. Established in 1997, the party holds pro-European views, and is an associate member of the Party of European Socialists (PES) and a full member of the Socialist International. According to its statute, the PSDE pleads that Moldova is an independent, sovereign, and democratic state, based on law, and integrated in the united family of European democracies. Under the leadership of Marian Lupu, but also due to the strong influence of the Moldovan Orthodox Church, the party was more conservative on social issues, such as LGBT rights. Currently, the party claims to be progressive and secular.

== History ==
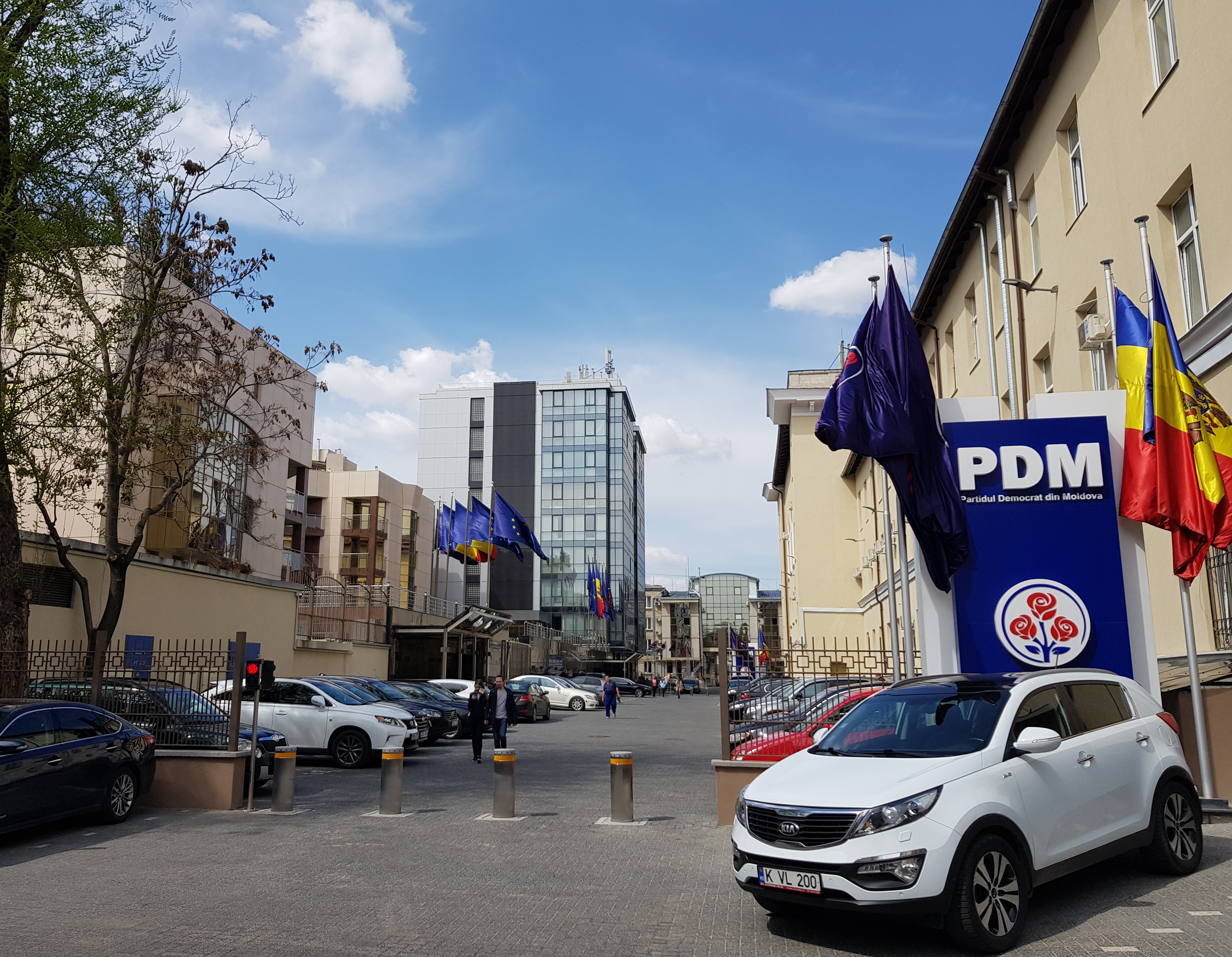
Party Headquarters in Chişinău, Strada București 90.

Former party logo

The party was established on 8 February 1997 as the Movement for a Democratic and Prosperous Moldova (Mișcarea pentru o Moldovă Democratică și Prosperă; MPMDP). On 17 October 1998 at the Congress, the leadership of the party was chosen and the status and political program based on the principles of social democracy was adopted. In parliamentary elections of March 1998, the electoral bloc formed on the basis of the Movement – the Bloc for a Democratic and Prosperous Moldova won over 18% of the votes and 24 seats in Parliament respectively, which allowed it to participate in governance, within the Alliance for Democracy and Reforms (ADR). From 1997 until the summer of 2009, the party was led by Dumitru Diacov, who held the position of Chairman of Parliament within 1997–2001. In 1999, Ion Sturza, the MPMDP representative, was appointed for the position of the prime minister.

On 15 April 2000, at the Congress of the Movement for a Democratic and Prosperous Moldova was changed its name to the Democratic Party of Moldova (Partidul Democrat din Moldova). In parliamentary elections of February 2001, the PDM won 79,757 votes (5.02%) but failed to overcome the 6% electoral threshold. On 25 May 2003, at the local elections, the party won over 8.3% of the votes and took good position in the country.

On 22 November 2003, at the Congress the new objectives of the party were set. One of the core document that was adopted at the Congress was the new edition of the political program, where the party declares an immutable character of its scopes and principals. At the Congress, the PDM declared the intention to become a member of Socialist International and the Resolution on relationships between PDM and the trade union movement was adopted. On 8 May 2004, in response to the voters' expectations regarding strengthening the reforming and democratic forces, the PDM, the Alliance "Our Moldova" and Social and Liberal Party (SLP) established the Democratic Moldova Block (DMB).

Following the parliamentary elections held on 6 March 2005, the PDM won eight seats in the parliament, being the only party which had lost the election in 2001 and came back in the parliament in 2005. In October 2007, the Social and Liberal Party MPs joined the PDM's parliamentary group and the number of Democrats increased to 11, and the PDM became at that time the third political force in the Parliament.

After merging of the PDM with the Social and Liberal Party, which took place at the Congress on 10 February 2008, Dumitru Diacov was re-elected as a chairman of the party, and former Social and Liberal Party leader Oleg Serebrian became the deputy chairman. The PDM's party hymn became the Beethoven's "Ode to Joy", which symbolizes the pro-European vector of the party and its adhesion to the European federalist flow. On 19 July 2009, Marian Lupu was elected as party chairman at the Extraordinary Congress of the PDM.

On 5 April 2009 at the Parliamentary elections, the PDM won only 2.97% of votes, and remained out of the Parliament. In the 29 July 2009 elections, the PDM won 13 seats, and became in a very short time one out of four components of the Alliance for European Integration (AEI) that gained the majority at the Parliament of the Republic of Moldova. Marian Lupu, the PDM's candidate, was delegated as the candidate of the Alliance for European Integration for the position of the President of the Republic of Moldova at the elections held on 10 November and 7 December 2009 but did not gain enough votes.

Following the early parliamentary elections of 28 November 2010, the PDM won 15 seats in the Parliament and became one out of three components of the AEI-2. In early 2013, following the resonant Pădurea Domnească case, the alliance fell apart. In May 2013, PDM (with 15 MPs), the Liberal Democratic Party of Moldova (31 MPs) and the Liberal Reformist Party (seven MPs) established the new governing coalition – the Pro-European Coalition.

Following the parliamentary elections of 30 November 2014, the PDM won 15.8% and formed the pro-European governing coalition, having 19 MPs in the Parliament of the Republic of Moldova. After the elections, the PDM and Liberal Democratic Party (23 MPs) established the minority governing coalition – the Political Alliance for a European Moldova. Since 2009, the Democratic Party has been a full member of the Socialist International. From 2010 until 2015, the PDM was an observer member of the Party of European Socialists and in June 2015, the PDM became an associate member of the Party of European Socialists.

On 14 January 2016, Pavel Filip, delegated by the PDM and backed by the new parliamentary majority became the new candidate for prime minister position. The government headed by Filip was voted and appointed, with the votes of 57 members of parliament: 20 PDM's MPs, 13 LP's MPs, 14 former Communist Party's MPs, 8 MPs and 2 former MPs of the Liberal Democratic Party.

The VIIIth Congress was called after the decisions adopted at the meeting of the PDM's Political Council held on 10 December 2016 when the party leader, Mr. Marian Lupu, announced his resignation from the PDM's chairman position. The main task of the VIIIth Congress was the election of new leadership, adoption of new changes in the party's statute and streamlining new modernization objectives of the party. Vlad Plahotniuc was elected for the position of the PDM chairman and he gained unanimous supportive votes of delegates at the congress. Plahotniuc said that he would focus on the modernization of the political party, to become a party that promotes citizens' interests rather than geopolitical ones. The congress delegates elected Filip as first deputy chairman of the PDM, voted the list of the new National Political Council and adopted the new edition of the Party Statute. According to the organizers, about 1.000 delegates from all the districts of the country and guests from abroad participated in the congress.

On 10 March 2017, the 14 former Communist MPs who formed the Social Democratic Platform for Moldova (SDPM) joined the parliamentary faction of the PDM. Democratic faction leader, Marian Lupu said at the press briefing that the decision of the 14 MPs “is a step that will lead to the strengthening of the parliamentary majority”, thus, the PDM became largest political group in the Parliament.

In the 2019 parliamentary election, the PDM received 23.6% of the vote, gaining 30 seats in parliament, making it the second largest party in Moldova. The party moved into opposition to the new Sandu Cabinet formed by Party of Socialists of the Republic of Moldova (PSRM), Party of Action and Solidarity (PAS) and Dignity and Truth Platform. In November 2019, Sandu was removed by the Parliament of Moldova through a motion of no confidence and PDM and PSRM formed a new coalition government. Fifteen of PDM's deputies refused to join PSRM in the new government and split away forming the Pro Moldova party, which moved into opposition.

The Democratic Party of Moldova started a reconstruction process in the autumn of 2021, Monica Babuc being elected interim president of PDM. In 2022, the Democratic Party of Moldova and the Social Democratic Party of Romania started a strategic partnership. On 25 August, the headquarters of the Moldovan-branch of the PSD was inaugurated within the PDM headquarters, which was led by Iurie Ciocan. on 7 October, the first edition of the Forum of local elected officials of the PDM and PSD (Romania) was organized, attended by over 150 mayors, Local, district and county councilors from both Romania and Moldova, under the motto “United by infrastructure”. At the X congress of the PDM (which was attended also by PSD leaders such as Marcel Ciolacu, Victor Negrescu and Vasile Dîncu), it was voted to change the name to the European Social Democratic Party (Romanian: Partidul Social Democrat European, PSDE). Ion Sula was elected party president and Mircea Buga, first vice-president. The party's new logo that was introduced was similar to that of the PSD, consisting of three roses on a solid, bordered background. PSDE started negotiations with the like-minded National Alternative Movement (MAN) but was excluded from MAN's political bloc Alternative. Both Boris Foca and Diacov called for a reunification of PSDE, Modern Democratic Party and Marian Lupu's Respect Moldova Movement (MRM) under its old name.

== Ideology ==
The PSDE's doctrine is based on the principles of social democracy. It has the following core values: "Equality, so that all individuals can realize their potential on fair terms; Solidarity, so that all people have everything they need for a decent standard of living; and Freedom, so that each individual can build his/her own personal life project." The Polish Institute for International Affairs has said that under oligarch Vladimir Plahotniuc the party was in practice akin to a centrist party of power.

Within the identity controversy, the party has an unclear position. Marian Lupu (then party president) said in 2014 that the party is centrist, characterized by a modern, pro-European Moldovenism. On the other hand, there are people in the party who consider themselves Romanians, and some even support the union with Romania. However, there are also Soviet nostalgics, that regard Romanians as "fascists".

=== Objectives ===
PSDE states its desire to achieve the following objectives:

1. Consolidation of the constitutional order in the state, guaranteeing respect for political, economic and social human rights in line with the Universal Declaration of Human Rights, the European Convention on Human Rights and other international legal instruments.
2. Building and confirmation in the Republic of Moldova of a civil nation according to the principle "we are all Moldovans as citizens of the Republic of Moldova", while respecting the right of every citizen to ethnic self-identification.
3. Completion of the process of territorial reintegration of the Republic of Moldova through political decisions, in a peaceful manner.
4. Assignment of a socially active role to the state, which through strong institutions should become a balancing force in society. The state is the one who should take care to ensure public welfare, to perform the tasks of common interest, to promote justice and solidarity in society. The attributes of strong public institutions are good governance, law and transparency.
5. Reformation and modernization of local and central public administration, whose activity needs to be aligned with the interests of the country and oriented towards serving citizens.
6. Implementation in the Republic of Moldova of the concept of a powerful social state that plays a key role in protecting against social risks, in ensuring economic and social well-being of its citizens, focusing on education, research, innovation, culture and adherence to national values.
7. Enforcement of the right of citizens to work and of the right to build their own future in economic and social security. In this regard, the DPM believes that the state is obliged to invest in the citizen and ensure well-paid jobs and continuous professional training of citizens.
8. Establishment of a fair system of redistribution of state revenues aimed at providing decent living conditions for people unable to work (children, elderly people, disabled people, etc.) It is necessary to develop and use the resources of society to ensure equal rights, to give everyone a chance to create their own destiny, to reduce economic inequalities, to fight poverty and ensure social justice.
9. Development the optimal set of programs for the social protection of vulnerable social groups, paying great attention to development and promotion of policies of social inclusion and employment of disabled people.
10. Establishment of an effective health care and education system, to which every citizen should have access, regardless of available financial resources.
11. Diversification and development of modern programs for training and adoption of young people in conjunction with the policies based on the active ageing concept.
12. Guaranteeing the right to private property and ensuring free and fair competition as the basis of the market economy, human dignity and security. Private property is an economic expression of a free initiative of the citizen and a key factor in overall economic progress, individual and collective well-being.
13. Consolidation of representative democracy to lend more credibility to institutions and to ensure citizens the right to free expression and participation in decision-making processes.
14. Respect for human rights and fundamental freedoms, the right to cultural, linguistic, religious and ethnic identity of citizens of the Republic of Moldova. We seek to combat and condemn any kind of extremism, manifestations of racism, chauvinism, ethnic or territorial separatism.
15. Ensuring equal opportunities between men and women, acknowledgment of women's role in the family and Moldovan society, support and promotion of gender equality in the decisive structures of the party and the state.
16. Development of an equitable tax system aimed at guaranteeing security and helping reduce social tensions, as well as facilitate economic development.
17. Application of economic policies aimed at sustainable and uniform economic growth throughout the country based on innovation, productivity and competitiveness, creating conditions to generate revenues in budgets of all levels sufficient to ensure the implementation of social policies, as well as the well-being of the population.
18. Development of a competitive mixed economy, aimed at combining a dynamic private system, an effective public sector and a system of quality services available to citizens. Combination of efforts of these sectors, including by applying the concept of Private Public Partnership.
19. Implementation of the sustainable development principle aimed at meeting current needs. Conservation of environment which is threatened by human activities, risks of climate change and loss of biodiversity. The state must respond to the current needs of society in a manner that does not negatively affect the future of new generations.
20. Strengthening of the constitutional status of permanent neutrality.
21. Promotion of a balanced foreign policy aimed at ensuring the image and interests of the Republic of Moldova in the regional and global context, by integrating the Republic of Moldova into the European Union and developing cooperation with the CIS countries.

=== International membership ===
The PSDE has been a full member of the Socialist International since 1 July 2008. Further, the party collaborates with the Party of European Socialists and with parties of a similar orientation from other countries. The PSDE is also a member of the Progressive Alliance.

In June 2018, the PSDE joined the Social Democratic group of the Parliamentary Assembly of the Organization for Security and Co-operation in Europe.

== Party congresses ==
Event	Date	Decisions andresults
The Congress for the constitution of the Social-Political Movement "FOR A DEMOCRATIC AND PROSPERITY MOLDOVA"	8 February 1997	Dumitru Diacov was elected as a chairman; the program of the social-political movement "FOR A DEMOCRATIC AND PROSPERITY MOLDOVA" was approved.
The Congress I of PmDPM	17 October 1998	Dumitru Diacov was reelected as chairman; the governing body was elected; launching the appeal to centrist parties and movements to unite in a political organization for the country's development.
The Congress II of PmDPM	15 April 2000	PmDPM was reorganized into the Democratic Party of Moldova (PDM); the governing bodies were elected; amendments to the Statute of the Party were adopted; the Political and Economic Program of PDM was voted; Dumitru Diacov was reelected as chairman.
The Congress III of PDM	22 November 2003	mobilizing the organizational and informational resources of the DPM to ensure the passage of the electoral threshold; amendments to the PDM Statute were adopted.
The Congress IV of PDM	3 July 2005	the composition of the party leadership has been confirmed; Dumitru Diacov was reelected as chairman.
The Congress V of PDM	10 February 2008	the Social and Liberal Party merged with the Democratic Party of Moldova, continuing under the name the Democratic Party of Moldova; the strengthening of the political center from the Republic of Moldova in the context of preparations for the parliamentary elections in 2009; the new leadership of the party was elected: Dumitru Diacov was elected as a chairman of the united party, Oleg Serebrian — the first deputy chairman of PDM, Oazu Nantoi, Valentina Buliga, Igor Klipii, Valentina Stratan şi Dumitru Ivanov were elected as deputy chairmen of the PDM, Oleg Ţulea, the leader of the Democratic Party Youth Organization, was appointed as Party General Secretary;
The Extraordinary Congress VI of the PDM	19 July 2009	there have been introduced changes to the Party Statute; Marian Lupu was elected as a chairman; Dumitru Diacov was elected as honorary chairman of the party; Oleg Serebrian retained his position of the first deputy chairman; Valeriu Lazăr (former Minister of Economy and Trade) was elected as General Secretary; as deputy chairmen, have been appointed Igor Corman, Oleg Ţulea, Oazu Nantoi, Valentina Stratan, Igor Klipii şi Valentina Buliga; Party of Communists of the Republic of Moldova and SDP members (of the SDP district organizations – Glodeni, Bălți, Anenii Noi) joined the PDM; the leader of the Social-Political Movement ”New Force”, Valeriu Pleșca, announced that the Movement will support PDM in the 29 April 2009 elections, but further will join the PDM.
The Congress VII of PDM	16 June 2012	there have been adopted measures to modernize the PDM in the existing political context and to choose the new governing bodies of the party; Marian Lupu was elected as chairman; Vladimir Plahotniuc was elected as first deputy chairman; there were elected the National Political Council of the party, the National Commission of Censors and the Ethics and Arbitration Commission; there have been approved the new statutory documents of the DPM, including the Statute and the Political Doctrine.
The Congress VIII of PDM	24 December 2016	party leader Marian Lupu, announced his resignation as PDM chairman; Vlad Plahotniuc was elected as PDM chairman; Pavel Filip was elected as first deputy chairman; the list of the new Political National Council was voted; a new version of the Party Statute was adopted.
The Congress IX of PDM	7 September 2019	Pavel Filip has been elected for the position of the PDM chairman; Alexandru Jizdan has been elected as the secretary general of the DPM; the political Declaration and Congress Resolution were adopted; a new list of the National Political Council was voted; the changes in the PDM Statute have been approved.
The Congress X of PDM	20 November 2022	It was voted to change the name of the party to the European Social Democratic Party (PSDE); It was agreed to start a strategic partnership between the PSDE and the Romanian Social Democratic Party; Ion Sula was elected as president; Mircea Buga was elected as first Vice-President; Eremei Priseajniuc and Vadim Brînzaniuc were elected vice-presidents.; Dumitru Diacov was removed from the position of honorary president;
The Congress XI of PSDE	22 December 2024	Tudor Ulianovschi was elected as president; Ion Sula and Alexandr Cauia was elected as first vice-presidents; the National Political Council, the National Censors Commission and the College of Ethics and Arbitration re-elected; the Declaration of the Congress adopted;

== Organization ==
The logo of the PSDE is composed of three separate roses inside a white square with blue outline; the logo is practically the same as the Romanian PSD.

The PSDE's National Political Council is the governing body of the party during the period between two congresses. The meeting of the National Political Council is convened at least twice a year by the President of the PSDE or at the request of at least 1/3 of the members of the National Political Council. The PSDE's National Political Council is elected by the Congress for a term of four years, the numerical composition being determined by the PSDE's Congress decision. The Political Council is representative of the members of all the districts of the country, which ensures the PSDE members' decision-making power is valued and respected.

The PSDE's Executive Board is the decision-making executive body of the PSDE, which coordinates the activity of the latter during the period between meetings of the National Political Council. The Executive Board is elected for a term of four and composed of 31 members. The Permanent Bureau is the body that carries out an operational analysis and synthesis of the activity of the party during the period between meetings of the National Political Council and the Executive Board and is convened weekly or when necessary, at the request of Chairman of the PSDE. The Permanent Bureau of the PSDE brings together the chairman, first deputy chairman, honorary chairman, deputy-chairmen, and secretary general of the PSDE. This leadership is mandated by party members to analyze and decide on the day-to-day political activities of the PSDE.

The PSDE includes Women's Organization, Democratic Youth, "Treasure of the Nation" Elderly People Organization, and local elected officials. The Women's Organization is the most powerful, active and representative party organization of women in Moldova. As of July 2018, party membership was c. 54,200.

=== Leadership ===
- President – Vasile Bumacov
- First Vice President – Ion Sula and Alexandr Cauia

== Election results ==
Parliament
Election	Leader	Performance					Rank	Government
Election	Leader	Votes	%	± pp	Seats	+/–	Rank	Government
1998	Dumitru Diacov	294,691	18.16% (PMDP (Note: For a Democratic and Prosperous Moldova list won 24 seats; 2 went to the Civic Party of Moldova and 1 to the New Force Movement))	New	21 / 101	New	3rd	Coalition (ADR: CDM-PDMP-PFD)
1998	Dumitru Diacov	294,691	18.16% (PMDP)	New	21 / 101	New	3rd	Coalition (ADR: CDM-PDMP-PFD)
1998	Dumitru Diacov	294,691	18.16% (PMDP)	New	21 / 101	New	3rd	Support (Independents→BeAB)
2001	Dumitru Diacov	79,757	5.02%	▼13.14	0 / 101	▼21	▼5th	Extra-parliamentary (PCRM)
2005	Dumitru Diacov	444,377	28.53% (BEMD (Note: Electoral Bloc Democratic Moldova list won 34 seats; 23 went to the Our Moldova Alliance and 3 to the Social Liberal Party))	▲23.51	8 / 101	▲8	▲2nd	Opposition (PCRM)
2005	Dumitru Diacov	444,377	28.53% (BEMD)	▲23.51	8 / 101	▲8	▲2nd	Opposition (PCRM)
2009 (Apr)	Dumitru Diacov	45,698	2.97%	▼25.56	0 / 101	▼8	▲7th	Extra-parliamentary (PCRM)
2009 (Jul)	Marian Lupu	198,268	12.54%	▲5.57	13 / 101	▲13	▲4th	Coalition (AIE: PLDM-PDM-PL-AMN)
2010	Marian Lupu	218,620	12.70%	▲0.16	15 / 101	▲2	▲3rd	Coalition (AIE: PLDM-PDM-PL)
2010	Marian Lupu	218,620	12.70%	▲0.16	15 / 101	▲2	▲3rd	Coalition (CPE: PLDM-PDM-PLR)
2014	Marian Lupu	252,489	15.80%	▲3.10	19 / 101	▲4	▼4th	Coalition (APME: PLDM-PDM)
2014	Marian Lupu	252,489	15.80%	▲3.10	19 / 101	▲4	▼4th	Coalition (AIE III: PLDM-PDM-PL)
2014	Marian Lupu	252,489	15.80%	▲3.10	19 / 101	▲4	▼4th	Coalition (PDM-PPEM-PL)
2019	Vladimir Plahotniuc	334,539	23.62%	▲7.82	30 / 101	▲11	▲2nd	Opposition (PSRM-ACUM: PAS-PPPDA)
2019	Vladimir Plahotniuc	334,539	23.62%	▲7.82	30 / 101	▲11	▲2nd	Coalition (PSRM-PDM)
2021	Pavel Filip	26,545	1.81%	▼21.81	0 / 101	▼30	▼6th	Extra-parliamentary (PAS)
2025	Tudor Ulianovschi	15,064	0.95%	▼0.86	0 / 101	Steady	6th	Extra-parliamentary (PAS)

In 2005, the PDM participated at the elections with the Alliance "Our Moldova". In 2018, the PDM forms the largest parliamentary faction in the Parliament, holding 42 MPs mandates.

President
Election	Candidate	First round		Second round		Result
Election	Candidate	Votes	%	Votes	%	Result
2001	Extra-parliamentary					Lost ✗
2005	Endorsed Vladimir Voronin	75 (Note: President was elected by 101 members of Parliament. 61 votes were needed to win)	74.26%			Elected ✓
2009 (May–Jun)	Extra-parliamentary					No winner
2009 (Nov–Dec)	Marian Lupu	53 (Note: President was elected by 101 members of Parliament. 61 votes were needed to win)	52.48%	53 (Note: President was elected by 101 members of Parliament. 61 votes were needed to win)	52.48%	No winner
2011–2012	Endorsed Nicolae Timofti	62 (Note: President was elected by 101 members of Parliament)	61.39%			Elected ✓
2016	Endorsed Maia Sandu	549,152	38.71%	766,593	47.89%	Lost ✗
2020	Pavel Filip	Withdrew from the elections				Lost ✗

=== Local elections ===
==== District and municipal councils ====
Election	Votes	%	Seats
2007	112,242	9.7	117 / 1,103
2011	212,504	15.4	226 / 1,120
2015	226,661	17.6	259 / 1,116
2019	177.811	16.5	238 / 1,108
2023			88 / 1,086

In 2017, the number of representatives at the leading positions are 31 persons (the chairmen and deputy chairmen of the districts).

==== Town and village councils ====
Election	Votes	%	Seats
2007	105,888	10.5	1,155 / 10,621
2011	209,284	18.8	2,663 / 10,630
2015	232,460	21.9	2,810 / 10,564
2019	232,460	25.3	2,646 / 10,472
2023			1,018 / 9,972

==== Mayors ====
Election	Votes	%	Seats
2007	74	8.2	74 / 895
2011	220	24.5	220 / 898
2015	287	32	287 / 898
2017	396	44	396 / 898
2019	261	29	261 / 898
2023	103		103 / 898
