= Electoral Bloc Democratic Moldova =

Electoral alliance of political parties in Moldova

The Democratic Moldova Electoral Bloc (Romanian: Blocul Electoral Moldova Democrată, BEMD) was a centre-left electoral alliance of political parties in Moldova, led by Serafim Urechean.

== Membership of the Bloc ==
The alliance was formed by the following parties:

- Our Moldova Alliance (Alianţă Moldova Noastră)
- Democratic Party of Moldova (Partidul Democrat din Moldova)
- Social Liberal Party (Partidul Social Liberal)

== Parliamentary election, 2005 ==
At the parliamentary elections on 6 March 2005, the alliance won 444,377 votes (28.53% of the popular vote) and 34 out of 101 seats, in the XVIth legislature of the Moldovan Parliament. That enabled the alliance to pass the 12% threshold of representation.

After the elections the bloc fell apart into three parliamentary groups composed of the constituent parties.
