= Valeriu Troenco =

Moldovan general (born 1957)

Major general Valeriu Troenco
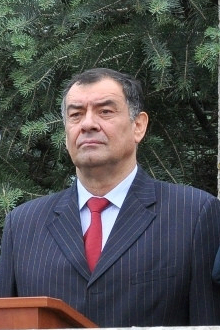
- Troenco in 2014

Minister of Defense
- In office 5 April 2014 – 18 February 2015
- President: Nicolae Timofti
- Prime Minister: Iurie Leancă
- Preceded by: Vitalie Marinuța
- Succeeded by: Viorel Cibotaru

Deputy Minister of Justice
- In office 1 June 1999 – 26 July 2001
- President: Petru Lucinschi; Vladimir Voronin
- Prime Minister: Ion Sturza; Dumitru Braghiș; Vasile Tarlev
- Minister: Ion Păduraru; Valeria Șterbeț; Ion Morei

Personal details
- Born: 2 June 1957 (age 68) Coșcodeni, Moldavian SSR, Soviet Union

Valeriu Troenco (born 2 June 1957) is a Moldovan general who served as Minister of Defense of Moldova from 2014 until 2015.
