= Ivanovca =

Ivanovca may refer to several places in Moldova:

- Ivanovca, a commune in Hînceşti district
- Ivanovca, a village in Iserlia Commune, Basarabeasca district
- Ivanovca, a village in Natalievca Commune, Făleşti district
- Ivanovca, a village in Sevirova Commune, Florești District
- Ivanovca, a village in Crasnencoe Commune, Transnistria
- Ivanovca Nouă, a commune in Cimişlia district
