= Veronica Mihailov-Moraru =

Moldovan lawyer

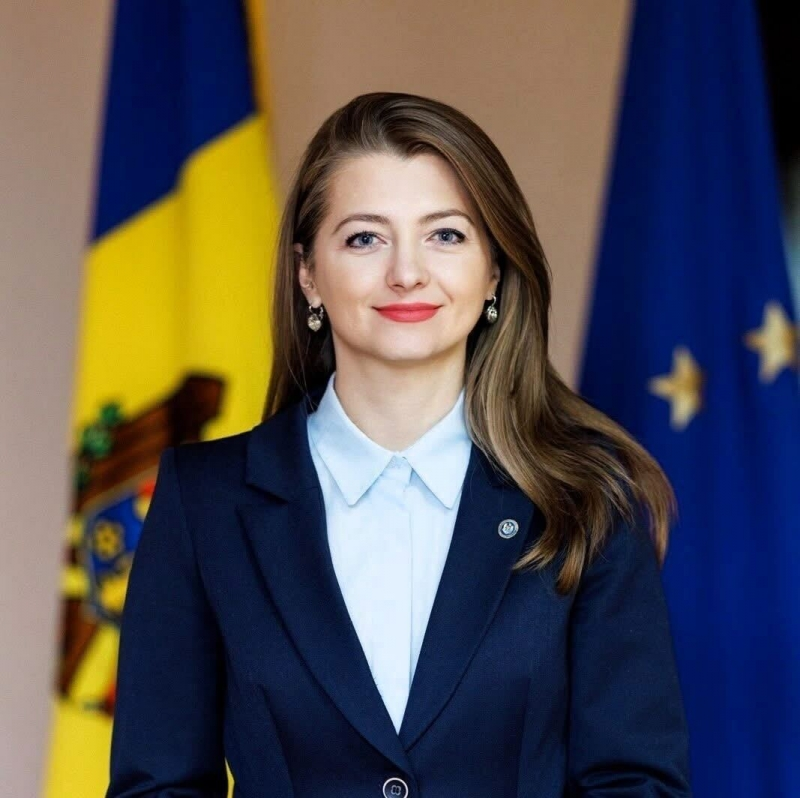
- Official portrait, 2025

Judicial Advisor to the President
- Incumbent
- Assumed office 11 November 2025
- President: Maia Sandu
- Preceded by: Veronica Bradăuțanu

Minister of Justice
- In office 16 February 2023 – 1 November 2025
- President: Maia Sandu
- Prime Minister: Dorin Recean
- Preceded by: Sergiu Litvinenco
- Succeeded by: Vladislav Cojuhari

Secretary of State of the Ministry of Justice
- In office 17 August 2021 – 16 February 2023
- President: Maia Sandu
- Prime Minister: Natalia Gavrilița
- Minister: Sergiu Litvinenco
- In office 2 September 2019 – 19 November 2019
- President: Igor Dodon
- Prime Minister: Maia Sandu; Ion Chicu
- Minister: Olesea Stamate; Fadei Nagacevschi

Personal details
- Born: September 29, 1982 (age 43) Chișinău, Moldavian SSR, Soviet Union
- Education: Moldova State University

Veronica Mihailov-Moraru (born 29 September 1982) is a Moldovan lawyer and human rights expert, who served as Minister of Justice of Moldova in the Recean Cabinet. She previously held the position of Secretary of State in the Ministry of Justice and has worked extensively in the legal and non-governmental sectors on issues related to human rights, the rule of law, and anti-corruption.

== Key Publications ==
- Mihailov-Moraru, V., Co-author of the report on the importance and role of probation programs at the national level, Association of Young Legal Professionals (AJPP), October 2018;
- Mihailov-Moraru, V., Co-author of the guide for professionals in the criminal justice system: The role of the presentence report in assessing a person's character, AJPP, June 2018;
- Mihailov-Moraru, V., Co-author of the legal opinion (amicus curiae) submitted to the Venice Commission on behalf of the Moldovan diaspora regarding changes to the electoral system and their impact on voters abroad, May 17, 2017;
- Mihailov-Moraru, V., Co-author of the alternative report on violations of economic and social rights, with a focus on discrimination against women lawyers and lawyers in general in Moldova, submitted to the UN Committee on Economic, Social and Cultural Rights, Association of Women Lawyers of Moldova (AFAM);
- Mihailov-Moraru, V., Co-author of the legal handbook “Defending victims of torture, ill-treatment or degrading treatment”, in collaboration with ABA ROLI, May 2013;
- Mihailov-Moraru, V., Research study: The journey of a child suspect through the criminal justice system in Moldova, Terre des Hommes Moldova, April 2017;
- Mihailov-Moraru, V., Co-author of the guide “Stop Torture: Practical advice for citizens”, in collaboration with Amnesty International Moldova, May 2013;
- Mihailov-Moraru, V., Co-author of the interdisciplinary study/report “Torture and ill-treatment of children in the context of juvenile justice”, in collaboration with Centrul Medical “Memoria,” UNICEF, and CpDOM, April 2013;
- Mihailov-Moraru, V., Author of the article “The Ombudsman Lawyer: A defense guide for lawyers in criminal cases”, Revista de Drept, April 2012.
