= Victoria Iftodi =

Moldovan jurist and politician (born 1969)

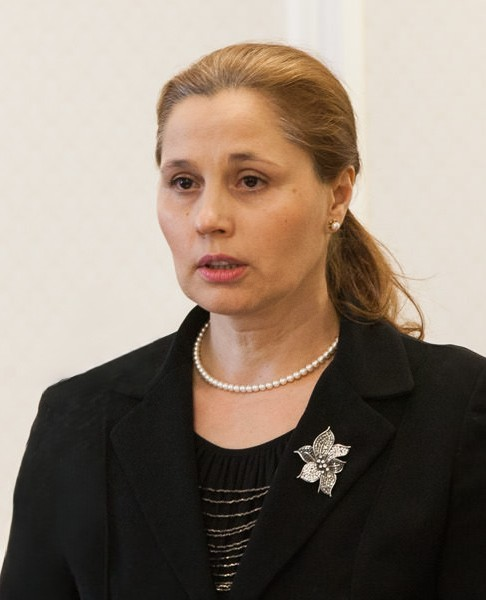
- Iftodi in 2018

Minister of Justice
- In office 19 March 2018 – 8 June 2019
- President: Igor Dodon
- Prime Minister: Pavel Filip
- Preceded by: Alexandru Tănase
- Succeeded by: Stanislav Pavlovschi
- In office 8 July 2004 – 20 September 2006
- President: Vladimir Voronin
- Prime Minister: Vasile Tarlev
- Preceded by: Vasile Dolghieru
- Succeeded by: Vitalie Pîrlog

Judge of the Constitutional Court
- In office 3 May 2017 – 19 March 2018
- Preceded by: Alexandru Tănase

Moldovan Ambassador to France, Spain and Algeria
- In office 21 December 2006 – 2 November 2009
- President: Vladimir Voronin; Mihai Ghimpu (acting)
- Prime Minister: Vasile Tarlev; Zinaida Greceanîi; Vitalie Pîrlog (acting); Vladimir Filat
- Preceded by: Andrei Neguța
- Succeeded by: Oleg Serebrian

Personal details
- Born: 13 January 1969 (age 57) Lalova, Moldavian SSR, Soviet Union
- Education: Moldova State University

Victoria Iftodi (born 13 January 1969) is a Moldovan jurist and politician. She served as Minister of Justice from 19 March 2018 to 8 June 2019.

She also served as Minister of Justice from 8 July 2004 to 20 September 2006.

== Early life ==
Iftodi was born on 13 January 1969 in Lalova, which was then part of the Moldavian SSR. Before working, she graduated from the Faculty of Law at the State University of Moldova in 1993. Between 1994 and 1996 she then worked as a chief specialist of the Bureau of Relations between the State Notary and Ministry of Justice and then worked briefly as a notary in Chișinău. Between 1993 and 2003 she was also a guest lecturer at her alma mater. In 2003 she became Deputy Minister of Justice and later was First Deputy Minister of Justice and representative of the government in relations with the Parliament of Moldova and the Constitutional Court of Moldova.

== Political career ==
From 2004 to 2006 she served as Minister of Justice. She was revoked from her position in 2006 by Vladimir Voronin as he stated he was dissatisfied with some of the work within the Cabinet of Ministers regarding the Accession of Moldova to the European Union, and he replaced her as he said he wanted effective results. In August 2006 it was announced that she would be the Moldovan Ambassador to France. She was also made Moldova's Ambassador ot Algeria and their permanent delegate to UNESCO.

In December 2016 she was appointed a representative in the Integrity Council as proposed by Vladimir Cebotari. In May 2017 she became a judge of the Constitutional Court of Moldova.

Political offices
Preceded by Vasile Dolghieru	Minister of Justice; 2004–2006	Succeeded by Vitalie Pîrlog
Preceded by Alexandru Tănase	Minister of Justice; 2018–2019	Succeeded by Stanislav Pavlovschi
