= Vasile Sturza =

Moldovan diplomat and politician

Reintegration Advisor to the President
- In office 1 April 2011 – 22 December 2016
- President: Marian Lupu (acting); Nicolae Timofti
- Succeeded by: Vasilii Șova

Moldovan Ambassador to Russia and Kazakhstan
- In office 7 September 2005 – 26 September 2008
- President: Vladimir Voronin
- Prime Minister: Vasile Tarlev; Zinaida Greceanîi
- Preceded by: Vladimir Țurcan
- Succeeded by: Andrei Neguța

Moldovan Ambassador to Bulgaria, Albania, Macedonia and Serbia and Montenegro
- In office 30 April 2003 – 19 September 2005
- President: Vladimir Voronin
- Prime Minister: Vasile Tarlev
- Preceded by: Gheorghe Hioară
- Succeeded by: Veaceslav Madan

Minister of Justice
- In office 5 April 1994 – 21 May 1998
- President: Mircea Snegur; Petru Lucinschi
- Prime Minister: Andrei Sangheli; Ion Ciubuc
- Preceded by: Alexei Barbăneagră
- Succeeded by: Ion Păduraru

Personal details
- Born: 13 March 1953 (age 73) Căbăiești, Moldavian SSR, Soviet Union

Vasile Sturza (born 13 March 1953) is a Moldovan attorney and politician. He was the Ambassador Extraordinary and Plenipotentiary of the Republic of Moldova to the Russian Federation.
