= Iordanovca =

- Village
- Location in Moldova
- Coordinates: 46°24′N 28°55′E
- Country: Moldova
- District: Basarabeasca District

Government
  - Mayor: Viorica Scobioală

Population (2014 census)
  - Total: 761
- Time zone: UTC+2 (EET)
  - Summer (DST): UTC+3 (EEST)
- Postal code: MD-6714
- Area code: 0297

Iordanovca is a village in Basarabeasca District, in Southern Moldova. It is situated on the west bank of the Cogîlnic River.

== Etymology ==
The name "Iordanovca" is a compound word of "Iordan" and "-ovka". "Iordan" is the Romanian and Slavic version of the English name "Jordan". "-ovka" is a Slavic suffix meaning "settlement of". So "Iordanovca" literally means "The Settlement of Iordan". This pattern is very common in Southern Moldovan and Ukrainian place names founded or renamed during the Russian Empire. Often being derived from the name of a founder, a landowner or an early settler.

== History ==
The village of Iordanovca is first mentioned in 1893 in the Bessarabia Governorate. At the beginning of the twentieth century there were only 67 houses registered in the village. The village grew to 120 households by 1923 as the locals were engaged in agriculture and livestock. The village had a mixed primary school, an Orthodox church, a rural post office, a town hall and a pub. In post-war Moldova, the inhabitants of Iordanovca and Carabetovca were organized into the collective farm "1 Mai" ("1 May"). The name of this collective farm refers to the International Workers' Day in the Soviet Union which occurred on the 1st of May.

== Places of Interest ==
Church of the Dormition of the Mother of God

The Church of the Dormition of the Mother of God is the Orthodox parish church of Iordanovca. The village celebrates its annual hram (patronal feast) on the 28th of August, the Feast of the Dormition of the Mother of God.

Monument to the fallen soldiers

A Soviet-era WWII Memorial with a mural of a woman holding flowers in her left hand. It stands in front of the town hall.

Iordanovca Town Hall

The Town Hall of Iordanovca is the Soviet-era local administrative office. It holds the mayor's office as well as the local council.

== Demographics ==
According to the 2014 Moldovan census, Iordanovca had a population of 761 residents. The village covers an area of 14.40 km² and has a population density of 52.85 inhabitants per square kilometer. It is entirely rural, with 376 males (49.4%) and 385 females (50.6%). In terms of age distribution, the majority of the population is of working age, with 589 individuals (77.4%) between the ages of 15 and 64. The younger population, those aged 0-14 years, accounts for 123 individuals (16.2%), while 49 people (6.4%) are aged 65 or older. Ethnically, Iordanovca is primarily composed of Moldovans, who make up 565 individuals (75.1%) of the population. A significant minority, 187 people (24.9%), identify as Romanians. This ethnic distinction is also reflected in the languages spoken: while 592 individuals (79.5%) speak Romanian as their native language, 153 (20.5%) speak Moldovan. Religion in Iordanovca is homogenous, with all of the population identifying as Orthodox Christians. The vast majority of residents were born in Moldova, with only 8 people (1.1%) born in the Commonwealth of Independent States.

== Administration and local government ==
Iordanovca is governed by a local council composed of nine members. The most recent local elections, in November 2023, resulted in the following composition: 6 councillors from the Party of Action and Solidarity and 3 councillors from the Party of Development and Consolidation of Moldova. The Party of Socialists of the Republic of Moldova also ran but did not get enough votes to elect a councillor. In the same elections, the candidate from the Party of Action and Solidarity, Viorica Scobioală, was elected as mayor with a 63.06% majority of the votes.
