= Vladimir Grosu =

Moldovan jurist and politician (born 1975)

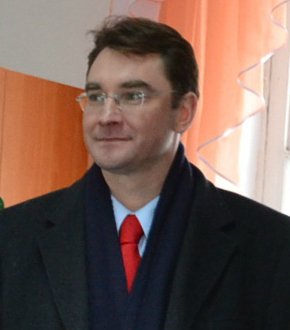
- Grosu in 2012

Minister of Justice
- In office 18 February 2015 – 30 July 2015
- President: Nicolae Timofti
- Prime Minister: Chiril Gaburici; Natalia Gherman (acting)
- Preceded by: Oleg Efrim
- Succeeded by: Vladimir Cebotari

Deputy Minister of Justice
- In office 15 June 2011 – 18 February 2015
- President: Marian Lupu (acting); Nicolae Timofti
- Prime Minister: Vlad Filat; Iurie Leancă
- Minister: Oleg Efrim

Personal details
- Born: 21 June 1975 (age 50) Sadaclia, Moldavian SSR, Soviet Union

Vladimir Grosu (born 21 June 1975) is a Moldovan jurist and politician. He served as Minister of Justice from 18 February 2015 to 30 July 2015.

From 2006 to 2011, he was representative of the Government of Moldova at the European Court of Human Rights.

Political offices
Preceded by Oleg Efrim	Minister of Justice; 2015–2015	Succeeded by Vladimir Cebotari
