= Oleg Efrim =

Moldovan politician and jurist

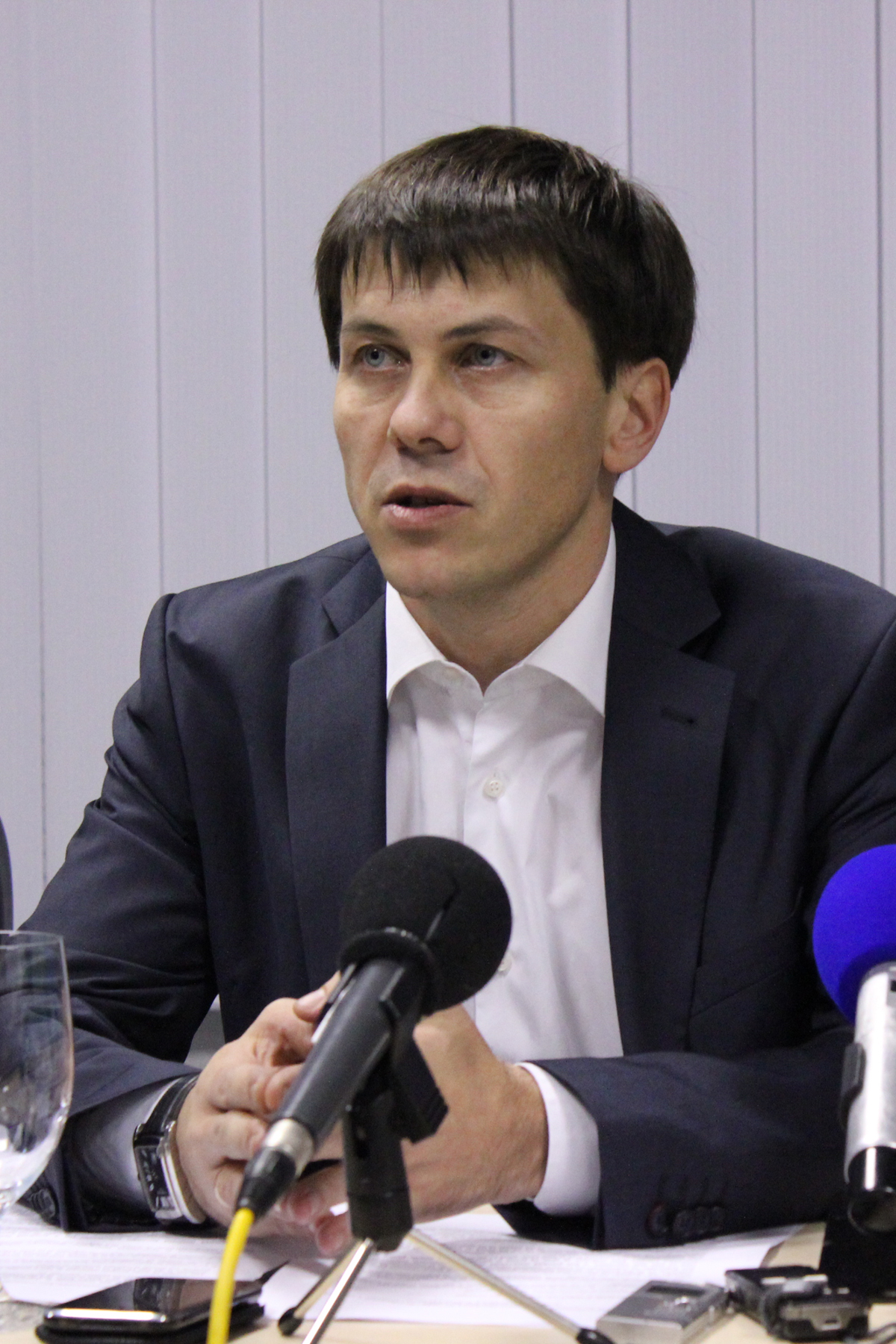
- Efrim in 2011

Minister of Justice
- In office 6 May 2011 – 18 February 2015
- President: Marian Lupu (acting); Nicolae Timofti
- Prime Minister: Vladimir Filat; Iurie Leancă
- Preceded by: Alexandru Tănase
- Succeeded by: Vladimir Grosu

Deputy Minister of Justice
- In office 11 November 2009 – 6 May 2011
- President: Mihai Ghimpu (acting); Vladimir Filat (acting); Marian Lupu (acting)
- Prime Minister: Vladimir Filat
- Minister: Alexandru Tănase

Personal details
- Born: 7 November 1975 (age 50) Cornești, Moldavian SSR, Soviet Union
- Children: 1
- Education: Moldova State University (1997)
- Profession: Jurist

Oleg Efrim (born 7 November 1975) is a Moldovan politician and jurist. He has served as the Justice Minister in Second Vlad Filat Cabinet since 6 May 2011 until 18 February 2015. He is a member of the Liberal Democratic Party of Moldova.

== Biography ==
Oleg Efrim was born on 4 November 1975 in the village of Cornești, Ungheni district, Moldavian SSR, USSR, but in documents, is November 7. In 1997 he graduated from the Faculty of Law of the State University of Moldova and from September of the same year he is a lecturer at the State University (Civil Law) and a lawyer. Between 2002 and 2008 he was a partner lawyer at the Associate Law Firm "Avornic & Partners". From October 2008 to November 2009 he was the Ombudsman of the Republic of Moldova at the Center for Human Rights. From November 2009 until May 2011 he was Deputy Minister of Justice of the Republic of Moldova. On 6 May 2011, by the Decree of the President of the Republic of Moldova no. 124, was appointed Minister of Justice of the Republic of Moldova.

For the parliamentary elections of 30 November 2014 from Republic of Moldova Oleg Efrim was not included in the list of PLDM candidates for the post of deputy. On 10 December 2014, following the validation of the vote, the Leancă Cabinet with Efrim in its composition resigned, observing the technical procedure provided by the law. On 16 December 2014 Oleg Efrim said he no longer wanted his job, even if he would receive from the party the offer to stay in this chair and in the next government.

Oleg Efrim is married to Violeta Marian (born 23 February 1980), a singer who together with her sister Nona formed the band "Fresh" in the past. They have a son named Paul.
