= Alexei Roibu =

Moldovan lawyer and security official

Brigadier general Alexei Roibu

Minister of Internal Affairs
- In office 14 January 2011 – 24 July 2012
- President: Marian Lupu (acting); Nicolae Timofti
- Prime Minister: Vladimir Filat
- Preceded by: Victor Catan
- Succeeded by: Dorin Recean

Deputy Director of the Security and Intelligence Service
- In office 2 March 2000 – 20 February 2002

Personal details
- Born: 17 November 1954 (age 71) Sadaclia, Moldavian SSR, Soviet Union
- Party: Liberal Democratic Party of Moldova
- Education: State Agrarian University; International University of Moldova

Military service
- Rank: Brigadier General

Alexei Roibu (born 17 November 1954) is a Moldovan lawyer and security official with the rank of brigadier general, who served as interior minister from January 2011 to July 2012.

== Early life and education ==
Roibu was born in Sadaclia, Cimișlia District, on 17 November 1954. He holds a bachelor's degree, which he received from the State Agrarian University of Moldova in 1976. From 1984 to 1985 he attended committee of state security in Minsk. He graduated from the International University of Moldova in 1998.

== Career ==
Roibu started his career in the Cimislia district where he served from 1976 to 1984. Then he worked in intelligence and security sector from 1984 to 2002. On 29 March 2002, he became first director of the centre for combating economic crimes and corruption and his tenure lasted for two years. From 2004 to 2009 he worked as a lawyer. In December 2009, he was named general manager of the border guard service and served there until January 2011. He was brigadier general when he assumed the post. On 14 January 2011, Roibu was appointed interior minister to the cabinet led by prime minister Vlad Filat. Roibu was a member of the Liberal Democratic Party of Moldova in the cabinet. His term ended on 24 July 2012 when he was removed from office. He was succeeded by Dorin Recean in the post.
