= Vladimir Cebotari =

Moldovan jurist and politician

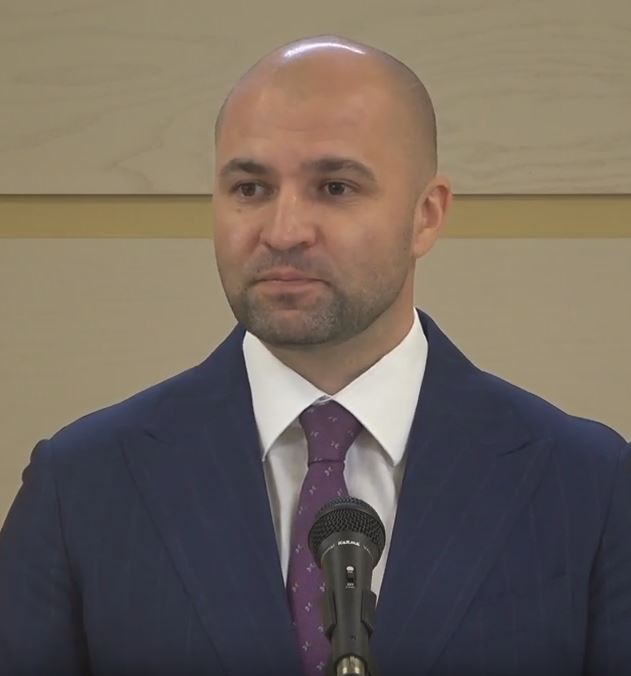
- Cebotari in 2019

Member of the Moldovan Parliament
- In office 9 March 2019 – 23 July 2021
- Parliamentary group: Democratic Party; Pro Moldova Party

Minister of Justice
- In office 30 July 2015 – 21 December 2017
- President: Nicolae Timofti; Igor Dodon
- Prime Minister: Valeriu Streleț; Gheorghe Brega (acting); Pavel Filip
- Preceded by: Vladimir Grosu
- Succeeded by: Alexandru Tănase

Deputy Minister of Transport and Roads Infrastructure
- In office 12 June 2013 – 9 April 2015
- President: Nicolae Timofti
- Prime Minister: Iurie Leancă; Chiril Gaburici
- Minister: Vasile Botnari

Personal details
- Born: 7 November 1980 (age 45) Sadaclia, Moldavian SSR, Soviet Union
- Party: Pro Moldova
- Spouse: Maria Cebotari
- Profession: Jurist

Vladimir Cebotari (born 7 November 1980) is a Moldovan jurist and politician, who since 30 July 2015 was the Minister of Justice of the Republic of Moldova in the Streleț Cabinet. Previously, he was Deputy Ministry of Economy and Infrastructure (Moldova) from June 2013 to April 2015, and then, general director of the State Enterprise "Calea Ferată din Moldova" in April–July 2015.

== Biography ==
Vladimir Cebotari was born on 7 November 1980 in the Sadaclia village, Basarabeasca rayon, of the Moldavian SSR, USSR.

== Education ==
In 1987–1996 he attended the general public in Chiperceni commune of the Orhei rayon, and in 1996–1998 he attended the general public no. 2 of Orhei. In 1998 he passed the Baccalaureate exams at "Gheorghe Asachi" High School in Chisinau and was admitted as a student at the Faculty of Law, Specialty of Economic Law of the Free International University of Moldova, which graduated from in 2003.

Training Courses:

- 2004 – Customer defense techniques in the court disputes, by William Hunt and Gillian More (Lecturers at the National Institute for Trial Advocacy of United States of America) with American Bar Association support – Central European and Euroasian Law Initiative.
- 2006 – English Law for International Lawyers, Euromoney Legal Training, Praga, Cehia
- 2011 – Executive Master of Business Administration, Newport University, S.U.A. (lessons held in Chisinau, Republic of Moldova, Republica Moldova)
- 2012 – MSc Air Transport Management, London City University, London, United Kingdom of Great Britain and Northern Ireland (not finished)
- 2019 - 2022 Executive Global Master in Management, London School of Economics and Political Science, London, United Kingdom of Great Britain and Northern Ireland.
- 2022 - MSc Executive Global Master in Management London School of Economics and Political Sciences, London, United Kingdom of Great Britain and Northern Ireland.

== Career ==
=== Professional activity ===
In 2003–2005 he worked as a legal advisor (for civil and commercial cases) at the Solomon Associate Lawyers’ Office in Chisinau. In August 2005 – November 2005 he was the senior consultant at the information-analytical department of the President of the Republic of Moldova. From 2006 to 2011 he was employed as the Secretary of the Administration Council of SCA"Air Moldova" and the director of the Legal Department (at the same company). In September 2008 – September 2009, he was the adviser to the General Director of the Transport Agency for Transport and Air Transport Coordination of the National Transport Priority Projects. From 2008 to 2010 he was the chairman of the board of directors of S.A. "North Railway Station".

From December 2011 to June 2013, Cebotari was the director of the Civil Aviation Authority of the Republic of Moldova.

From January 2014 to July 2014, he was the chairman of the Management Board of the S.I. "MoldATSA".

From April 2015 – July 2015, he was general manager of the State Enterprise "Moldovan Railways".

From August 2021, chairman of the Board of Directors of Fly One SRL (a Moldovan airline https://flyone.eu/en/)

From January 2022, member of the Board of Director of FlyOne LLC (an Armenian airline https://flyone.eu/am/)

From April 2022, chief executive officer of FlyOne Airlines SRL (a Romania air company, affiliated to Fly One SRL)

From March 2025, member of the Board of FlyOne Asia LLC (an Uzbekistan air company, part of FlyOne Group of airlines https://flyone.eu/uz/

=== Political career ===
From January 2011 by June 2013 he was Director General of Civil Aviation of Republic of Moldova.

From June 2013 by April 2015 he was the Deputy Minister of Transport and Road Infrastructure.

From 30 July 2015, by 20 December 2017 he was the Minister of Justice of the Republic of Moldova within the Strelet's Government. He was proposed for this position by the Democratic Party of Moldova.

In April 2017, he was elected as the deputy chairman of the Democratic Party of Moldova.

At the Parliamentary elections on 24 February 2019 he was elected as the MP (at the national constituency level) in the Parliament of the Republic of Moldova, which was dissolved on April 28, 2021, by the president of Republic of Moldovahttps://presedinte.md/app/webroot/Decrete/77.pdf.

On 19 September 2019 the Parliament voted to lift the parliamentary immunity of the MP Vladimir Cebotari, following the request of the interim general prosecutor, Dumitru Robu. The interim general prosecutor has stated that "in 2013, Vladimir Cebotari has acted in the interest of an organized criminal group, that contributed directly to the privatization of the Chișinău International Airport, by an organization affiliated to this criminal group". The parliamentary immunity was lifted in the same day when Vladimir Cebotari entered the electoral race for the position of the Mayor of the Chișinău Municipality. Vladimir Cebotari said that the Minister of Internal Affairs, Andrei Năstase, has coordinated the actions carried out by the Prosecutor Office against him, to decrease his chances to be elected as a mayor of the Chișinău Municipality.

On 1 July 2021 the general prosecutor office announced that Vladimir Cebotari was removed from criminal prosecution, concluding that "Vladimir Cebotari acted within the limits of the legally conferred attributions, therefore, his deed does not meet the elements of the imputed crime".

On 19 February 2020 Vladimir Cebotari, together with a group of MPs, left the faction of the Democrats and the Democratic party. On 20 February 2020 they announced at the press conference about the establishment of the Pro Moldova parliamentary group.

== Private life ==
Vladimir Cebotari is married and has two children.

His wife, Maria Cebotari, has reportedly been one of the main founders of the FlyOne airline, holding a 40 per cent stake.
