= Stanislav Pavlovschi =

Moldovan politician (born 1955)

Minister of Justice
- In office 8 June 2019 – 23 June 2019
- President: Igor Dodon
- Prime Minister: Maia Sandu
- Preceded by: Victoria Iftodi
- Succeeded by: Olesea Stamate

Personal details
- Born: 24 January 1955 (age 71) Florești, Moldavian SSR, Soviet Union (now Moldova)
- Party: Dignity and Truth Platform Party (2015–2019)
- Education: Law Institute in Kharkov

Stanislav Pavlovschi (born 24 January 1955) is a lawyer and politician from the Republic of Moldova, one of the founders of the Dignity and Truth Platform Party, an active participant in the social and political life of the Republic Moldova, advocating for protection of human rights and Moldova's adherence to the rule of law in Moldova.

== Education ==
From 1962 to 1972 he studied at the Florești school. In 1976 he was enrolled at the Law Institute in Kharkiv, Ukraine, currently the National Law University of Ukraine, which he graduated in 1980 and was awarded the merit distinction.

== Professional activity ==
Between 1980 and 1985, he was employed as an investigator and senior investigator at the Criuleni district prosecutor's office. From 1985 to 2001, he worked as an investigator on exceptional cases, senior investigator on exceptional cases, deputy head of the investigation department for exceptional cases and later deputy chief of the Criminal Prosecutor's Office of the Prosecutor General's Office.

From 1996 to 2001, he was a member of the Multidisciplinary Anti-corruption Group, established by the Council of Europe, where he participated in the elaboration of the Civil and Criminal Conventions against corruption.

In 2001 - 2008 he served as a Judge at the European Court of Human Rights.

Since 2008 he is a lawyer at the Union of Lawyers of Moldova. He works in the Associate Law Bureau "Corect", Chisinau, Republic of Moldova. He has participated in several EU projects on reforming the justice sector in Macedonia, Georgia, Azerbaijan, etc.

On 8 June 2019 he was appointed the Minister of Justice within Sandu Cabinet, he resigned from the position on 23 June 2019. Stanislav Pavlovschi mentioned that "When I was working on the Action Plan in the field of Justice, I identified several personal incompatibilities, which, unfortunately, according to the Constitution of the Republic of Moldova make my activity impossible as a Member of the Government... I remain committed to the democratic and pro-European values, promoted by the Dignity and Truth Platform and I will continue to promote them in the position of the deputy chairman of the Political Party Dignity and Truth Platform”.

On 16 September 2019 Stanislav Pavlovschi resigned from the position of the deputy chairman of the "Dignity and Truth Platform Political Party, and announce his retirement form the politics.

== Awards ==
He hold the honorary title "Om Emerit".
