= Sergiu Litvinenco =

Moldovan politician (born 1981)

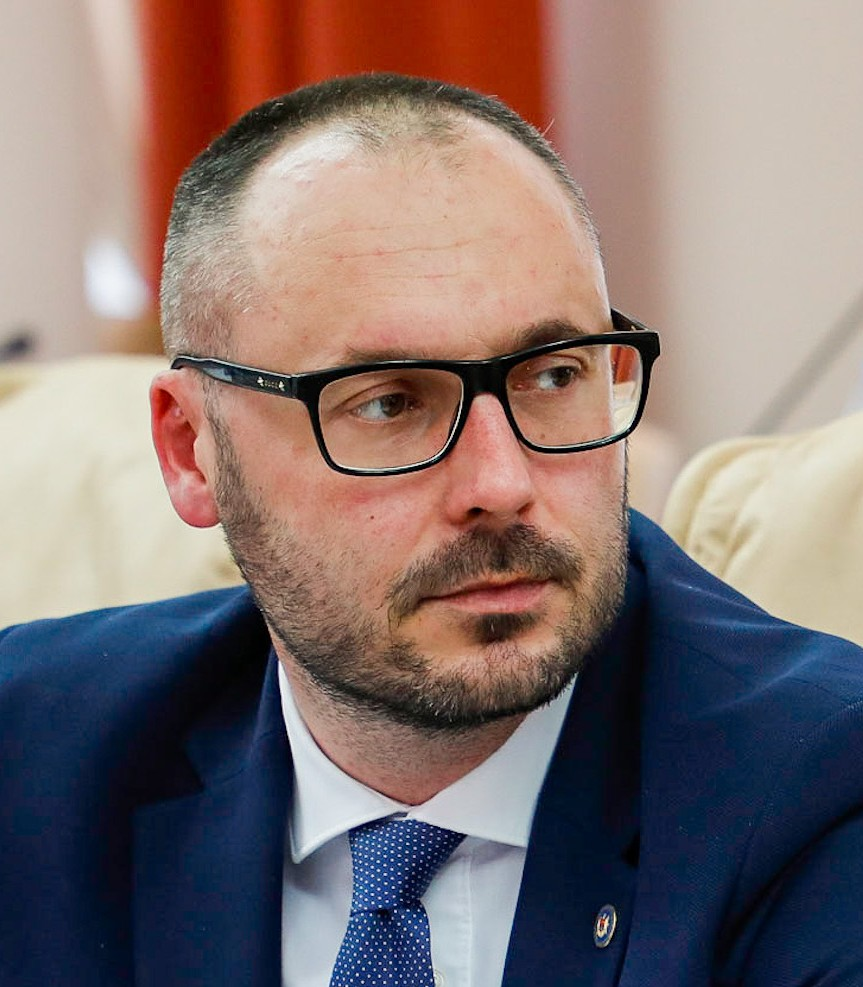
- Litvinenco in 2022

Judge of the Constitutional Court
- Incumbent
- Assumed office 17 August 2025
- Preceded by: Vladimir Țurcan

Minister of Justice
- In office 6 August 2021 – 16 February 2023
- President: Maia Sandu
- Prime Minister: Natalia Gavrilița
- Preceded by: Fadei Nagacevschi
- Succeeded by: Veronica Mihailov-Moraru

Member of the Moldovan Parliament
- In office 9 March 2019 – 8 September 2021
- Succeeded by: Evghenia Cojocari
- Parliamentary group: Party of Action and Solidarity

Personal details
- Born: 11 July 1981 (age 45) Hîrtop, Moldavian SSR, Soviet Union
- Education: Moldova State University

Sergiu Litvinenco (born 11 July 1981) is a Moldovan politician. He served as Minister of Justice from August 2021 to February 2023 in the cabinet of Prime Minister Natalia Gavrilița.

Political offices
Preceded by Fadei Nagacevschi	Minister of Justice; 2021–2023	Succeeded by Veronica Mihailov-Moraru
