= Vladislav Cojuhari =

Moldovan public official and politician (born 1985)

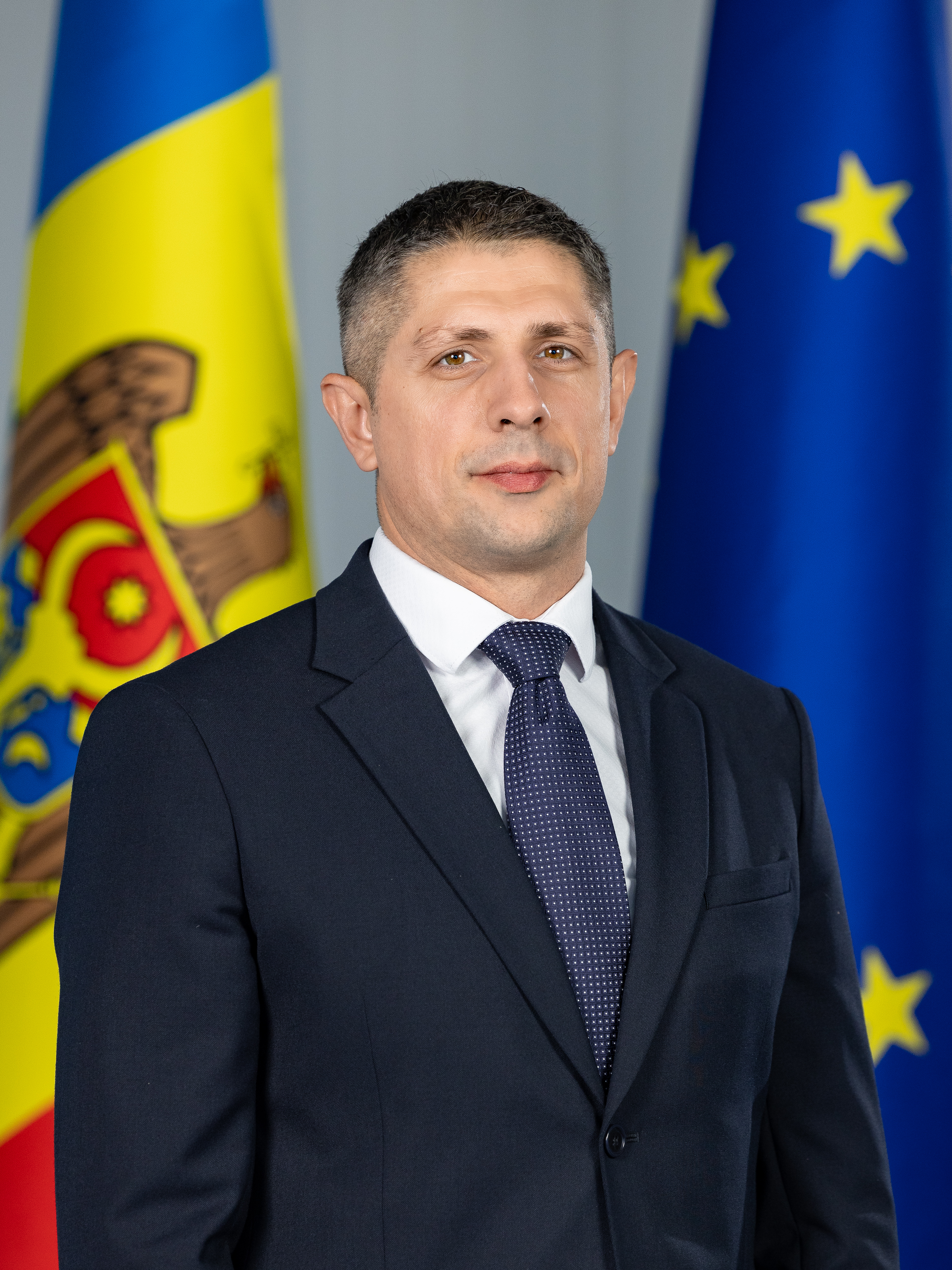
- Official portrait, 2025

Minister of Justice
- Incumbent
- Assumed office 1 November 2025
- President: Maia Sandu
- Prime Minister: Alexandru Munteanu; Eugen Osmochescu (acting); Vasile Tofan
- Preceded by: Veronica Mihailov-Moraru

Secretary General of the Ministry of Internal Affairs
- In office 12 December 2024 – 1 November 2025
- President: Maia Sandu
- Prime Minister: Dorin Recean
- Minister: Daniella Misail-Nichitin
- Preceded by: Serghei Diaconu

Personal details
- Born: 9 April 1985 (age 41) Bălți, Moldavian SSR, Soviet Union
- Education: Ștefan cel Mare Academy of the Ministry of Internal Affairs

Vladislav Cojuhari (born 9 April 1985) is a Moldovan jurist, currently serving as Minister of Justice of Moldova.
