= Mazilu =

Mazilu is a Romanian surname that indicates social origin and occupation. It originates with the word mazil, indicating a member of the free peasantry or the lowest ranks of the boyardom; its origins date to the 1740s, when the cadet branches of the boyardom in Wallachia, grouped as mazâli, were afforded fiscal privileges that still separated them from commoners. Used on its own, it may refer to:

- Adrian Mazilu (born 2005), Romanian footballer
- Dumitru Mazilu (born 1934), Romanian politician
- Ionuț Mazilu (born 1982), Romanian footballer
- Maria Marinela Mazilu (born 1991), Romanian skeleton racer
- Teodor Mazilu (1930–1980), Romanian writer and cartoonist
- Maria Cristina Grosu-Mazilu (born 1976), Romanian long-distance runner
