= Vasile Dolghieru =

Moldovan politician (born 1966)

Minister of Justice
- In office 12 February 2003 – 8 July 2004
- President: Vladimir Voronin
- Prime Minister: Vasile Tarlev
- Preceded by: Ion Morei
- Succeeded by: Victoria Iftodi

Personal details
- Born: 15 October 1966 (age 59)

Vasile Dolghieru (born 15 October 1966) is a former Moldovan politician. He served as Minister of Justice from 12 February 2003 to 8 July 2004. He was appointed via a presidential decree after Ion Morei was ousted earlier that day. In July 2004, Victoria Iftodi was appointed as his successor.

Political offices
Preceded by Ion Morei	Minister of Justice; 2003–2004	Succeeded by Victoria Iftodi
