= Sadaclia =

- Village
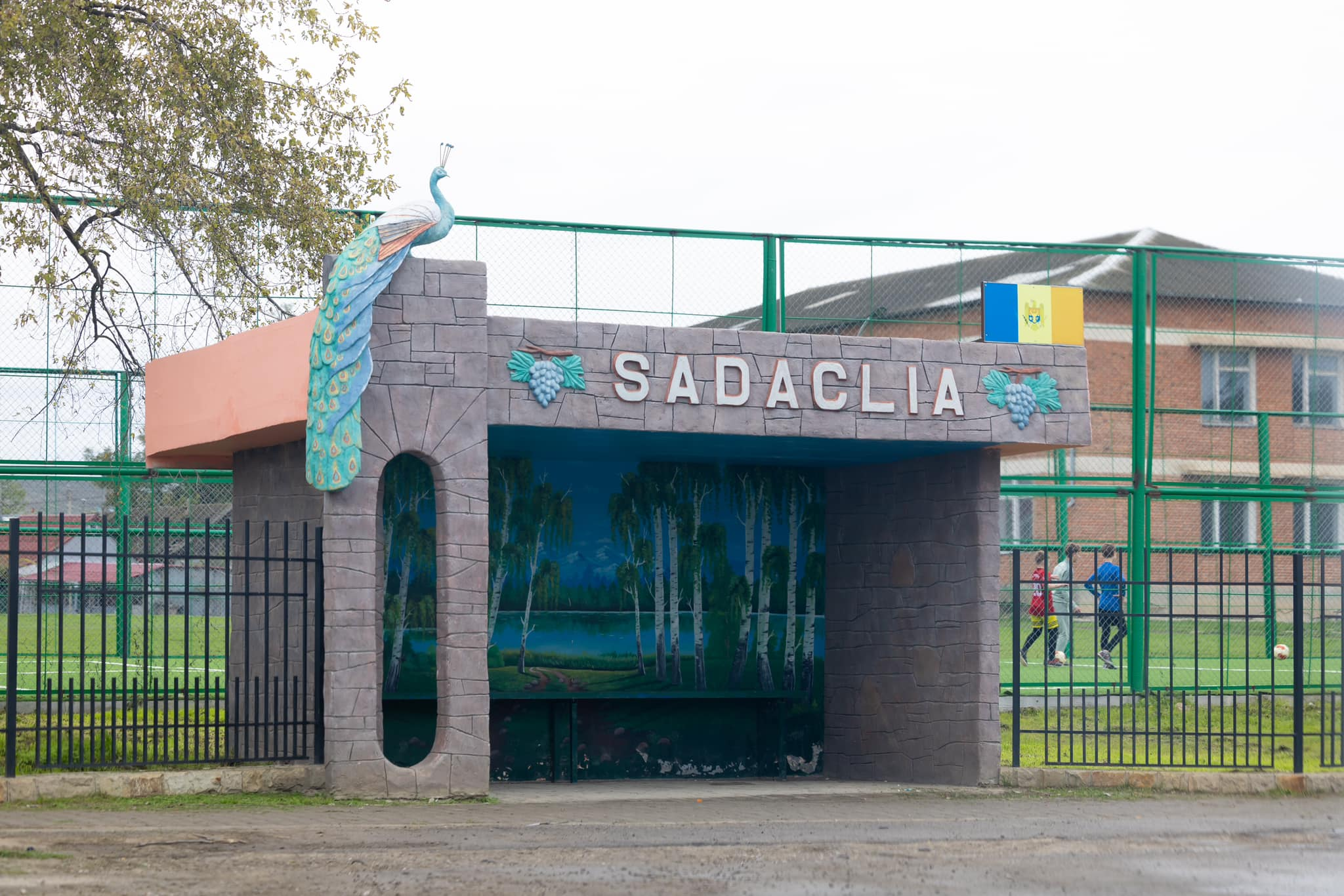

- Location in Moldova
- Coordinates: 46°27′N 28°53′E
- Country: Moldova
- District: Basarabeasca District

Government
  - Mayor: Ion Galeru

Population (2014 census)
  - Total: 3,526
- Time zone: UTC+2 (EET)
  - Summer (DST): UTC+3 (EEST)
- Postal code: MD-6716
- Area code: 0297

Sadaclia is a village in Basarabeasca District, Moldova. It is situated on the east bank of the Cogîlnic River.

== Etymology ==
The name "Sadaclia" comes from the name of a Tatar-Nogai tribe that were removed from the area after the Russo-Turkish War of 1768-1774 by the Tsarist government.

== History ==
The village of Sadaclia was first documented in 1793 and was founded on a ruined Tatar village. After the Tatars left, a settler community of 20 Moldavian mazili families, 4 ruptași families (peasants and small landholders) and 10 Polish families settled in the area. Later several Ukrainian families settled here as well. Following the annexation of Bessarabia by the Russian Empire, the Russian government granted vast tracts of land to the Russian General Sibirschi and to Lady Eufrosinia Muruzi. These peasant colonists received 1,920 desyatinas of land for their 63-64 families.

== Historical Monuments ==
Church of the Nativity of the Virgin Mary

The Church of the Nativity of the Virgin Mary is a historic church built in 1885 and is located in the center of the village.

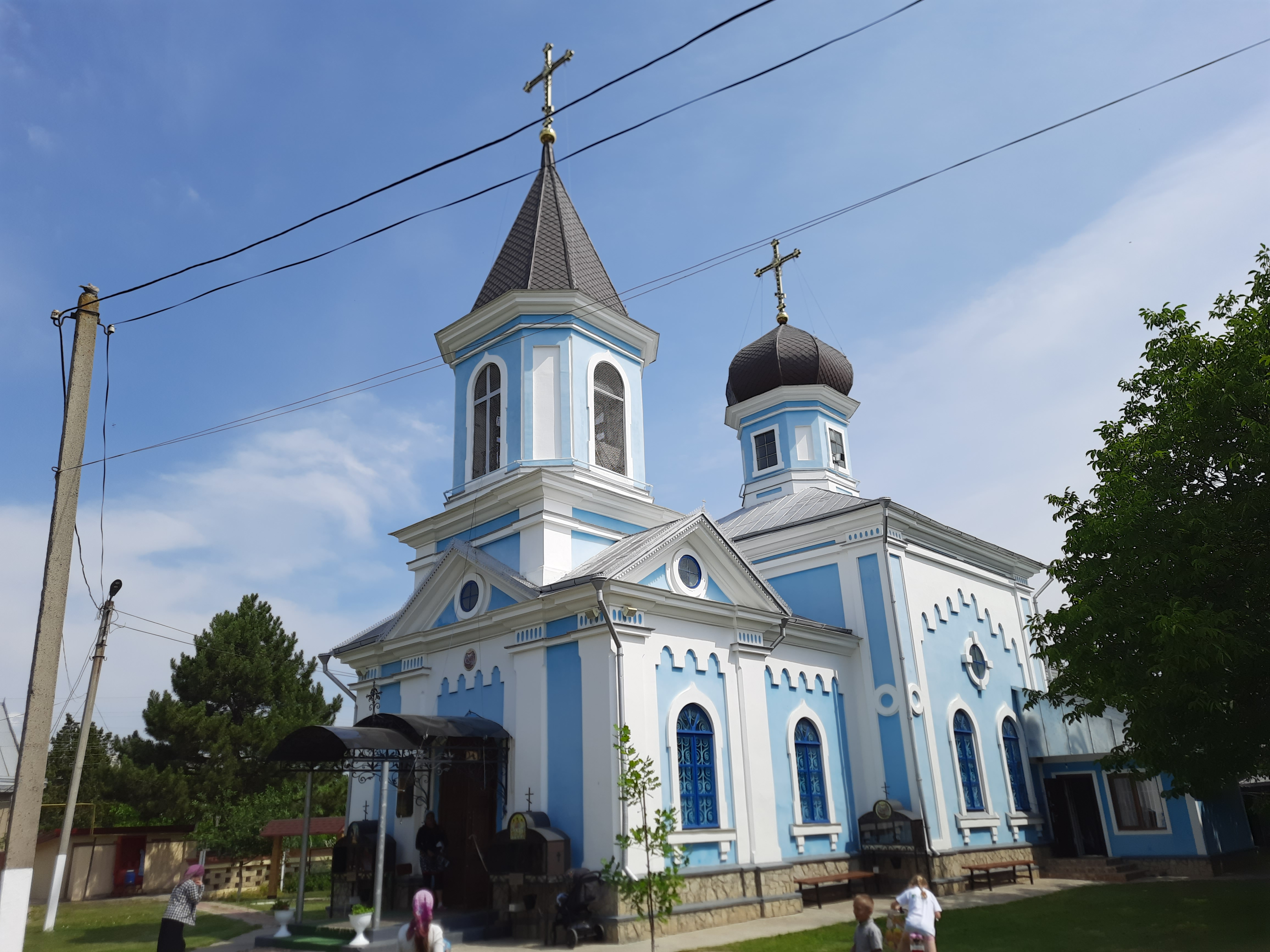
Church of the Nativity of the Mother of God in 2023

Monument in Memory of the Fellow Villagers Who Fell in the War (1941–1945)

World War II Memorial of Sadaclia.

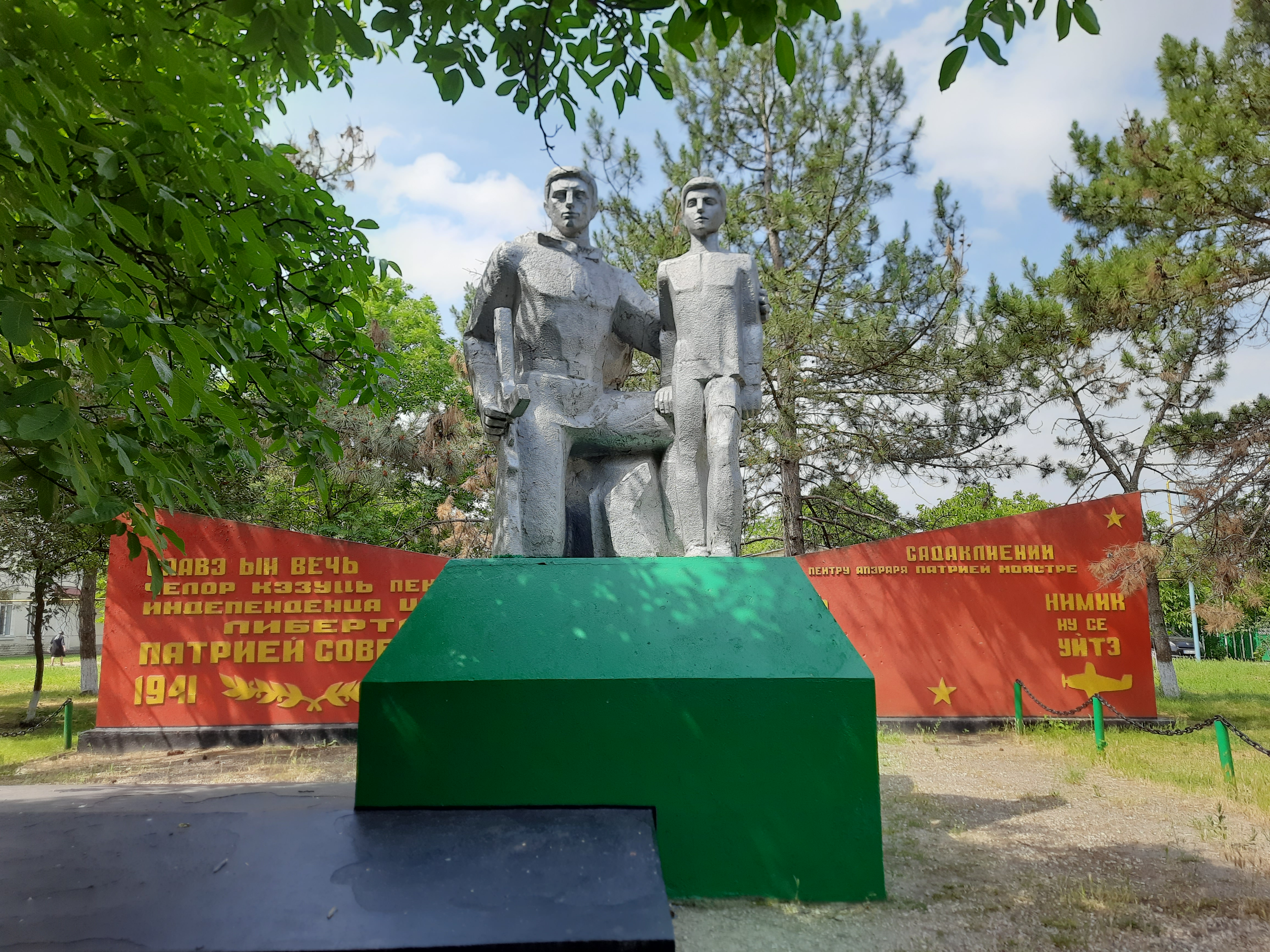
World War II memorial in Sadaclia

Sadaclia House of Culture

The Sadaclia House of Culture is a Soviet-era cultural center built in the center of town. It has two mosaic walls on the frontside. The Museum of History and Ethnography of Sadaclia has been housed in the center since 2008 and is the only museum in the Basarabeasca district.

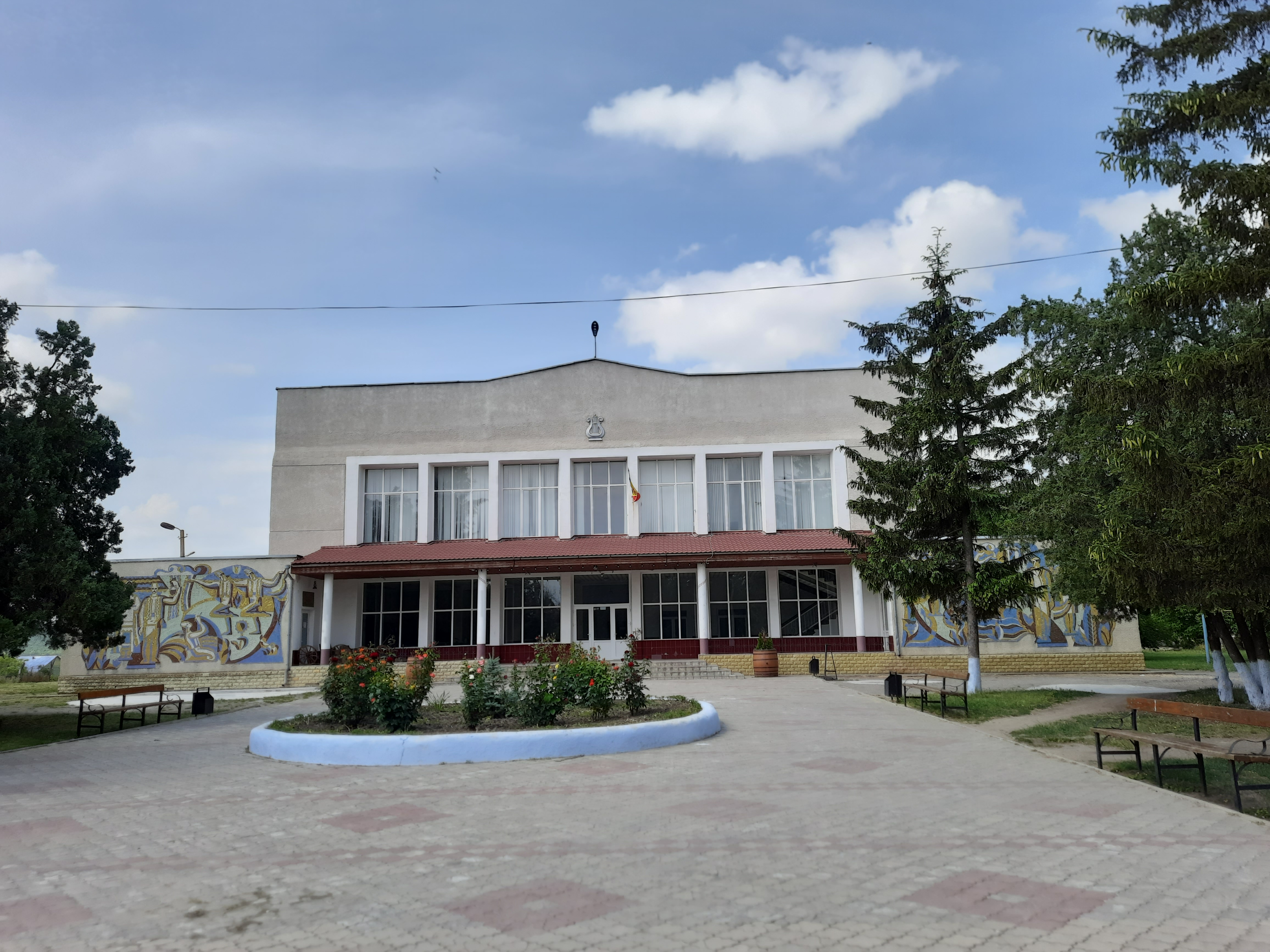
Sadaclia House of Culture, two Soviet-era mosaics can be seen on both the right and left side of the building

Sadaclia Town Hall

The Sadaclia Town Hall is a Soviet-era town hall built in the center of town. Nowadays it serves as the administrative headquarters of the commune, housing the mayor's office and the local council.

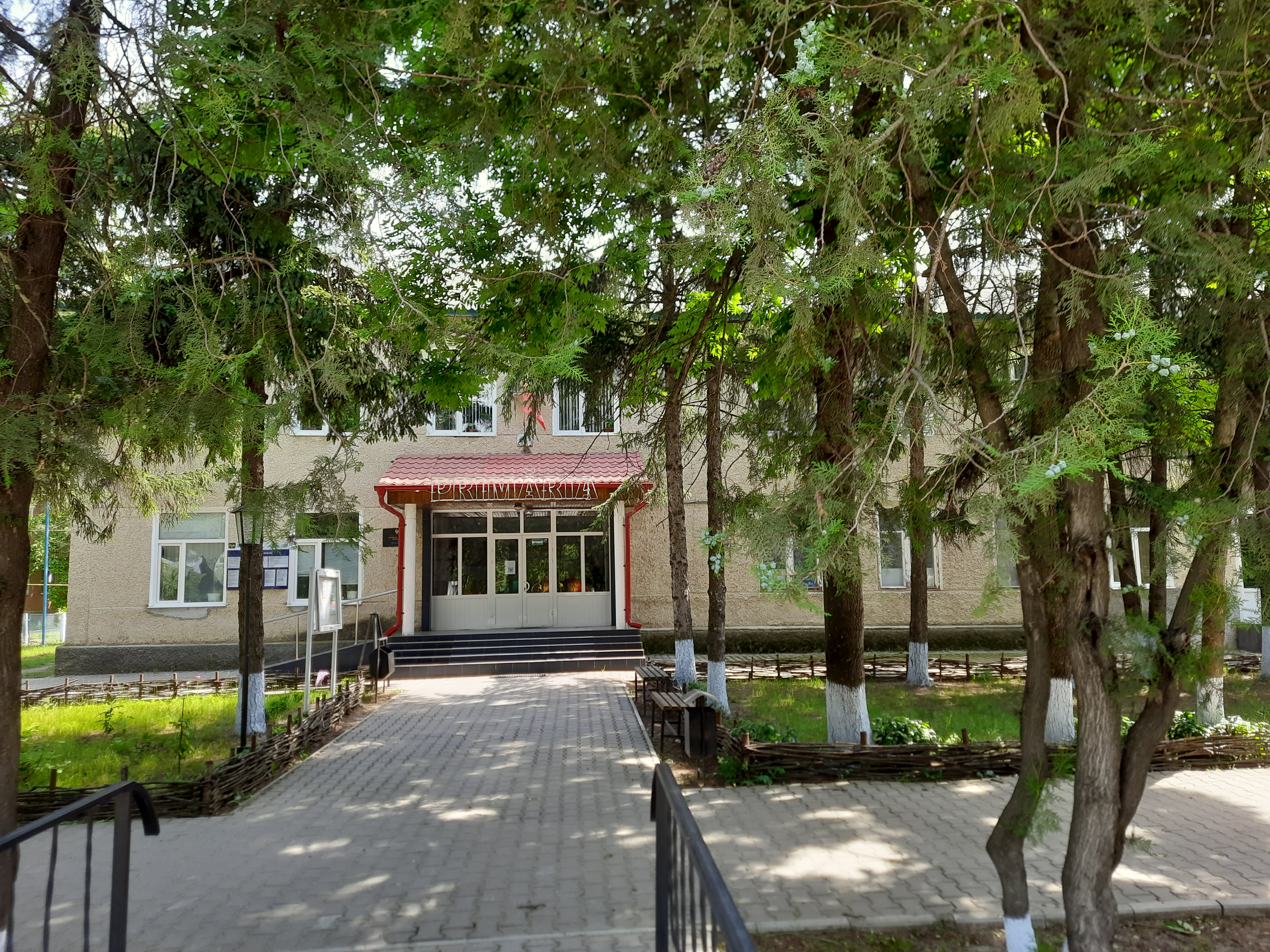
Sadaclia Town Hall in 2023

Monastery of St. Nicholas (Chistoleni)

The Chistoleni Monastery near Sadaclia traces its origins to 1932-1933 when Metropolitan Gurie Grosu established a hermitage on 50 hectares of land donated by the villager Vasile Pistol (also known as Chistol), from whom the monastery derives its name. In the early parts of the Second World War it was converted into an internment camp, bringing monastic life to a halt. From 1941-1944 it was converted into a nunnery, with St. Parascheva as its principal patron. After the Soviets returned it was converted into a typhus hospital, then a general hospital and finally a local collective farm. The original monastery gradually fell into ruin. After Moldova's independence it was re-established as a nunnery dedicated to St. Nicholas in 1997. After which new buildings and churches were constructed.

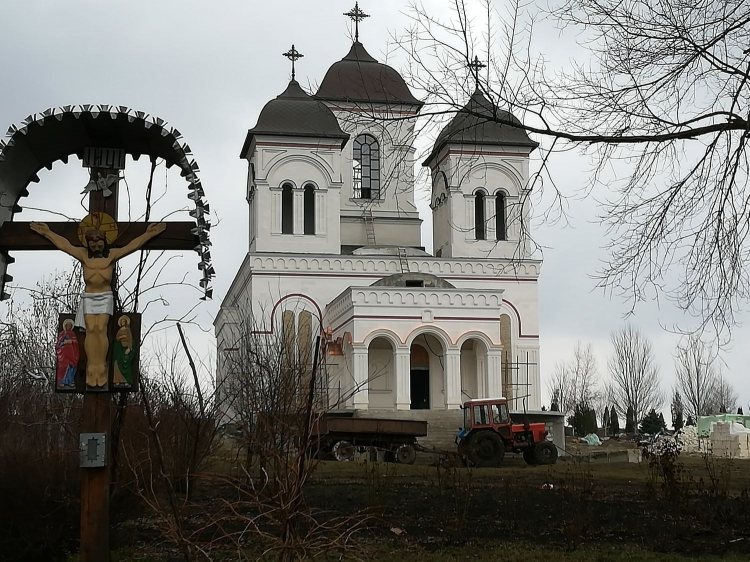
Chistoleni Monastery in 2023

== Demographics ==
According to the 2014 census the population of the village was 3,526 of whom 49.92% were men and 50.08% were women. 1332 households are accounted for in the village with an average of 3.3 people per household. The majority of the village is ethnically Moldovan with minorities of Ukrainians, Russians, Gagauz, Bulgarians, Jews and Romani.

Ethnic structure of Sadaclia
1. Moldovans (98.6%)
2. Russians (0.55%)
3. Ukrainians (0.21%)
4. Romani (0.16%)
5. Bulgarians (0.11%)
6. Gagauz (0.09%)
7. Jews (0.02%)
8. Other (0.23%)

== Politics ==
The composition of the Sadaclia local council (13 seats) as elected on 5 November 2023.

Sadaclia Local Council
Party	Seats
Party of Action and Solidarity	10
Independent - Aureliu Baciu	1
Dignity and Truth Platform Party	1
Party of Development and Consolidation of Moldova	1

== Notable people ==
- Vasile Costiuc (born 1981), Moldovan politician
- Alexei Roibu (born 1954), Moldovan lawyer and security official
- Vladimir Cebotari (born 1980), Moldovan jurist and politician
