= Iordan =

Iordan is, most of the time, a Romanian surname, but it is also used as a given name:

== Surname ==
- Andrei Iordan
- Iorgu Iordan
- Veaceslav Iordan
- Valeriy Iordan

== Given name ==
- Iordan Chimet

== See also ==
- Jordan (name)
- Iordana River
