= Iserlia =

- Commune
- Location in Moldova
- Coordinates: 46°29′N 28°57′E
- Country: Moldova
- District: Basarabeasca District

Population (2014)
  - Total: 1,205
- Time zone: UTC+2 (EET)
  - Summer (DST): UTC+3 (EEST)

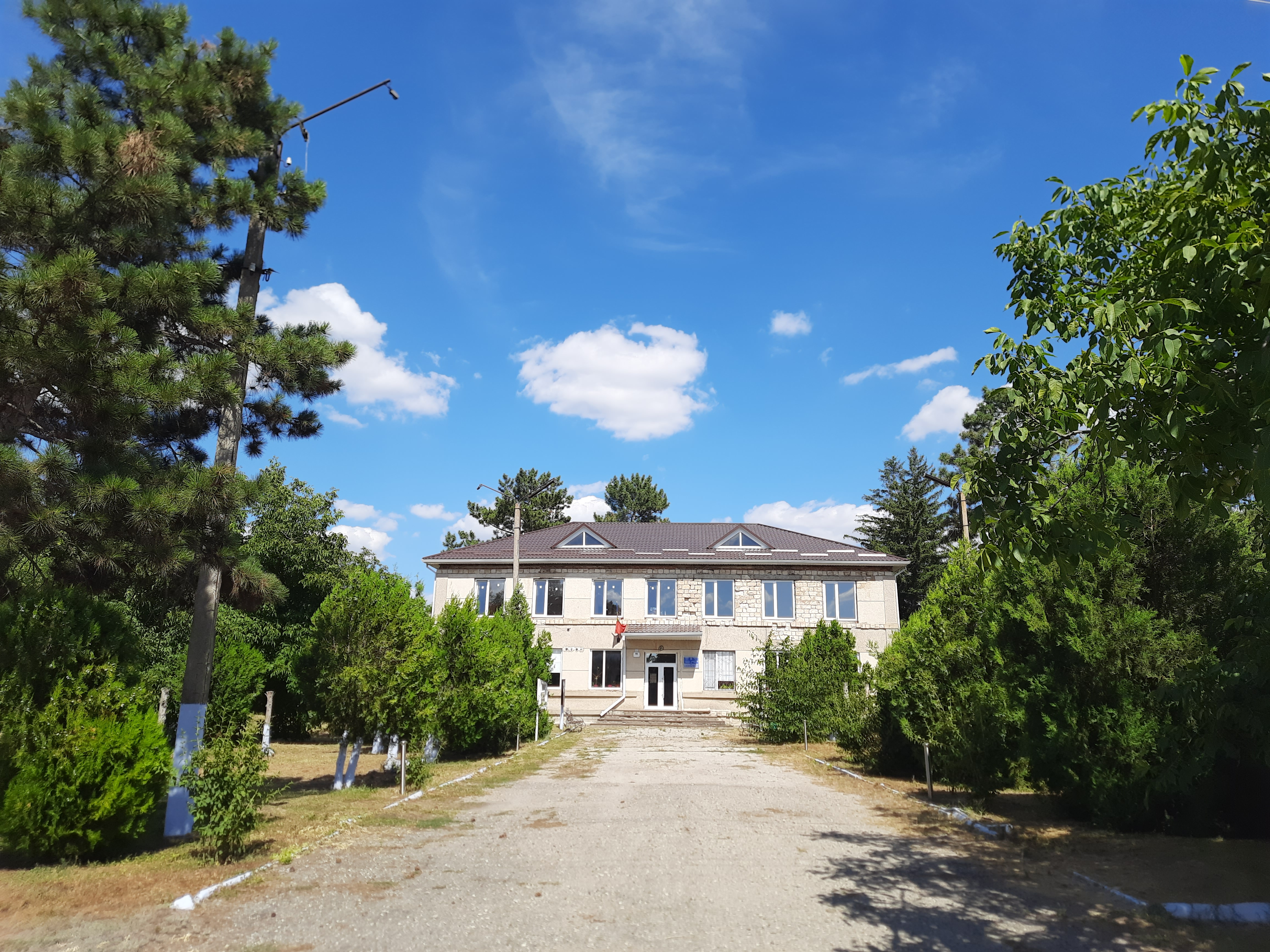
Iserlia

Iserlia is a commune in Basarabeasca District, Moldova. It is composed of a four villages: Bogdanovca, Carabiber, Iserlia and Ivanovca.
