= Mazil =

Mazil is the name of a boyar of the landed gentry in Wallachia and Moldavia, having no state or court function. The title of mazil attested that the bearer was of noble origin ("din os boieresc", literally "of boyar bone"). Mazili often formed separate military cavalry corps. The word derives from Ottoman Turkish mazul "dismissed (from duty)" and ultimately from Arabic maʻzūl.

== See also ==
- Mazilu
