= Ivanovca Nouă =

- Village
- Location within Moldova
- Coordinates: 46.7444444444°N 28.6936111111°E
- Country: Moldova
- District: Cimișlia District

Government
  - Mayor: Ion Balaur (PDM)

Population (2014 census)
  - Total: 694
- Time zone: UTC+2 (EET)
  - Summer (DST): UTC+3 (EEST)

Ivanovca Nouă is a village in Cimișlia District, Moldova.
