= Olesea Stamate =

Moldovan politician (born 1983)

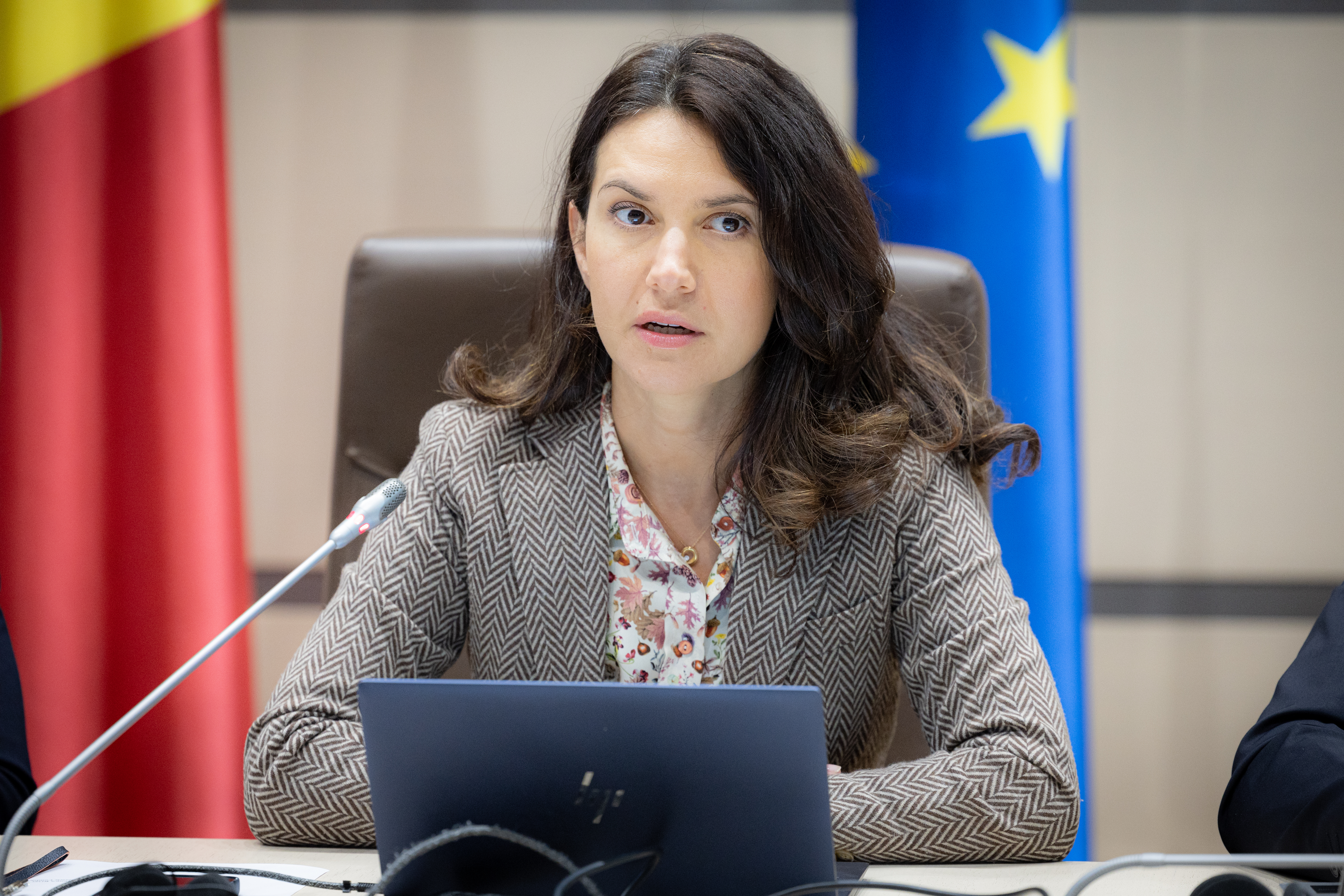
- Stamate in 2024

Member of the Moldovan Parliament
- In office 23 July 2021 – 16 October 2025
- Parliamentary group: Party of Action and Solidarity

Judicial Advisor to the President
- In office 24 December 2020 – 19 August 2021
- President: Maia Sandu
- Preceded by: Maxim Lebedinschi
- Succeeded by: Veronica Bradăuțanu

Minister of Justice
- In office 24 June 2019 – 14 November 2019
- President: Igor Dodon
- Prime Minister: Maia Sandu
- Preceded by: Stanislav Pavlovschi
- Succeeded by: Fadei Nagacevschi

Personal details
- Born: 20 December 1983 (age 42) Chișinău, Moldavian SSR, Soviet Union
- Education: Moldova State University; College of Europe

Olesea Stamate (born 20 December 1983) is a Moldovan politician. She served as Minister of Justice from 24 June 2019 to 14 November 2019. Fadei Nagacevschi was appointed as her successor.

She has a bachelor's degree in law from Moldova State University. She also has a master's degree in European Interdisciplinary Studies from College of Europe in Natolin, Poland.

Political offices
Preceded by Stanislav Pavlovschi	Minister of Justice; 2019–2019	Succeeded by Fadei Nagacevschi
