= Ion Păduraru =

Moldovan lawyer, judge, and politician (born 1961)

Ion Păduraru OR
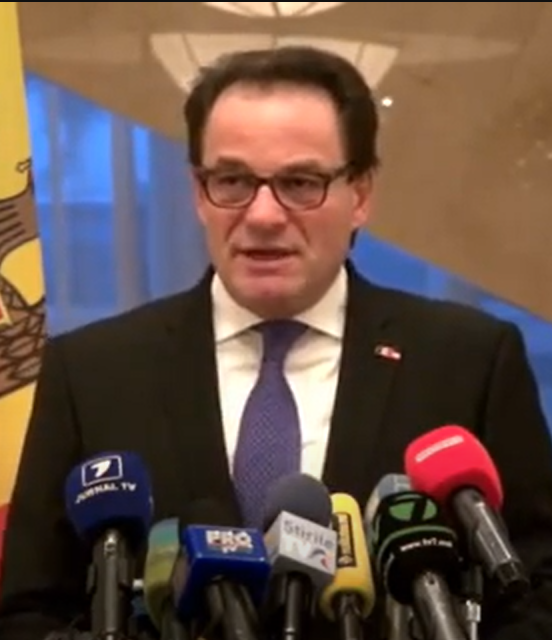
- Păduraru in 2016

Secretary General of the Office of the President of Moldova
- In office 6 April 2012 – 23 December 2016
- President: Nicolae Timofti
- Succeeded by: Ruslan Flocea

Minister of Justice
- In office 22 May 1998 – 21 December 1999
- President: Petru Lucinschi
- Prime Minister: Ion Ciubuc; Ion Sturza
- Preceded by: Vasile Sturza
- Succeeded by: Valeria Șterbeț

Personal details
- Born: 18 January 1961 (age 65) Țipletești, Moldavian SSR, Soviet Union

Ion Păduraru (born 18 January 1961) is a Moldovan lawyer, judge and former politician who held the office of Minister of Justice of Moldova from 1998 until 1999.
