= Ministry of Justice (Moldova) =

Government ministry of Moldova

- Ministerul Justiției
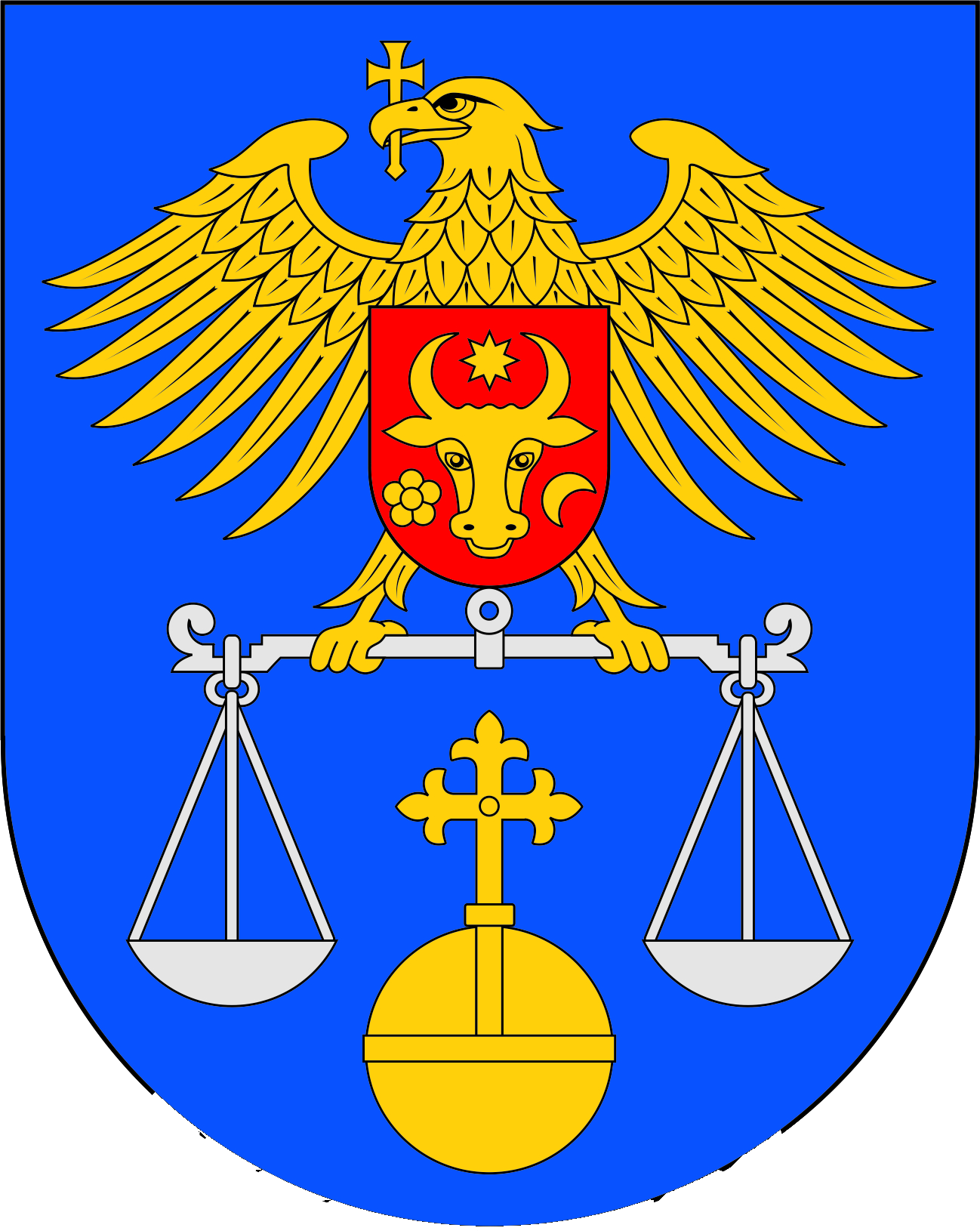
- Seal of the Ministry

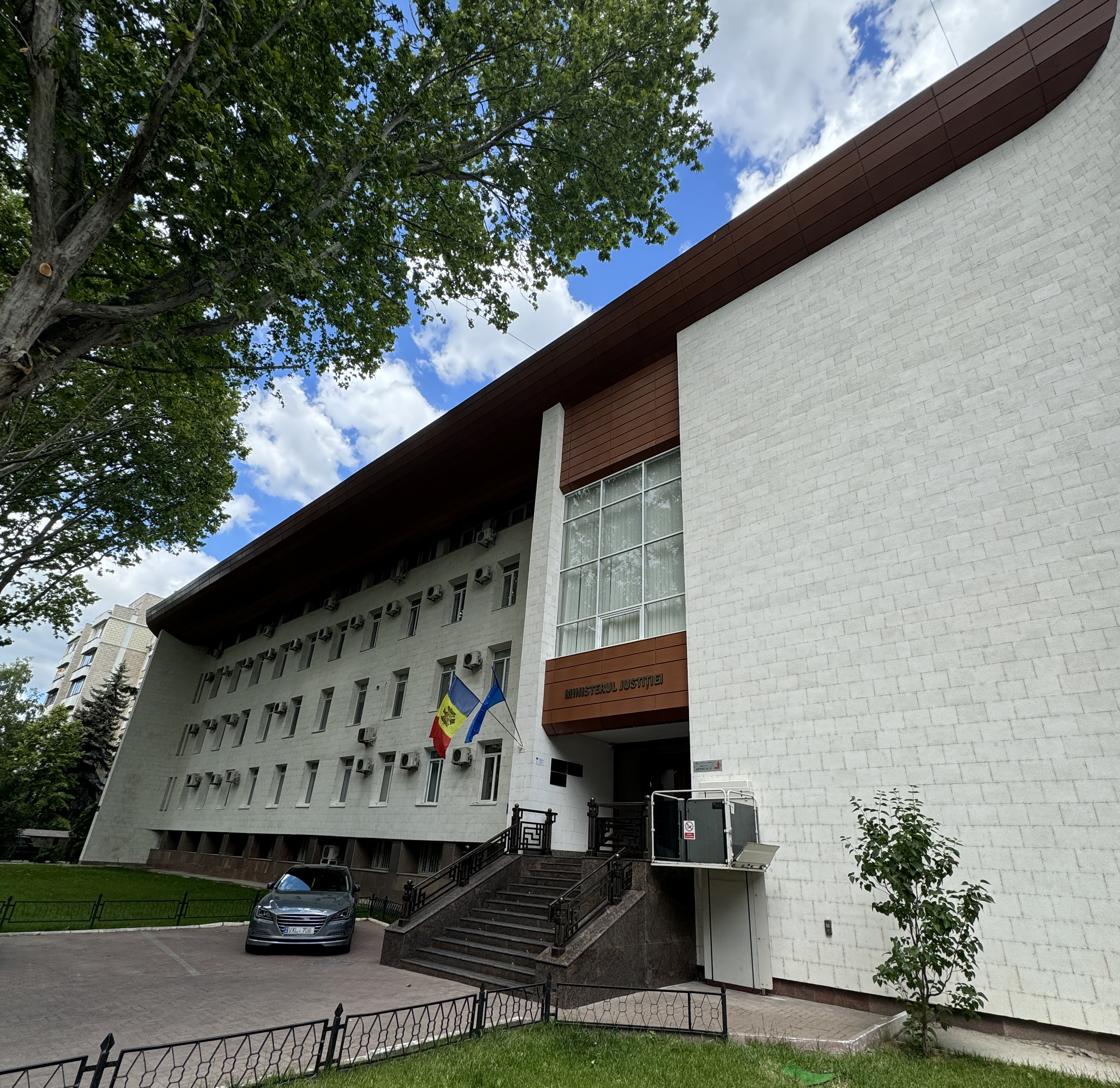
- Headquarters in Chișinău

Ministry overview
- Formed: 6 June 1990; 36 years ago
- Jurisdiction: Government of Moldova
- Headquarters: 82 31 August 1989 Street, Chișinău
- Minister responsible: Vladislav Cojuhari, Minister of Justice
- Ministry executives: Viorica Grecu, Secretary General; Lilian Apostol; Secretary of State; Eduard Serbenco, Secretary of State; Dumitru Vleju, Secretary of State
- Website: justice.gov.md

The Ministry of Justice (Romanian: Ministerul Justiției) is one of the fourteen ministries of the Government of Moldova. The current justice minister is Vladislav Cojuhari.

== List of ministers ==
| No. | Portrait | Name (Birth–Death) | Office term | | Cabinet |
|---|---|---|---|---|---|
| 1 | | Alexei Barbăneagră (born 1945) | 6 June 1990 | 5 April 1994 | Druc; Muravschi; Sangheli I |
| 2 | | Vasile Sturza (born 1953) | 5 April 1994 | 22 May 1998 | Sangheli II; Ciubuc I |
| 3 | | Ion Păduraru (born 1961) | 22 May 1998 | 21 December 1999 | Cibuc II; Sturza |
| 4 | | Valeria Șterbeț (born 1946) | 21 December 1999 | 19 April 2001 | Braghiș |
| 5 | | Ion Morei (born 1955) | 19 April 2001 | 12 February 2003 | Tarlev I |
| 6 | | Vasile Dolghieru (born 1966) | 12 February 2003 | 8 July 2004 | Tarlev I |
| 7 | | Victoria Iftodi (born 1969) | 8 July 2004 | 20 September 2006 | Tarlev I–II |
| 8 | | Vitalie Pîrlog (born 1974) | 20 September 2006 | 25 September 2009 | Tarlev II; Greceanîi I–II |
| 9 | | Alexandru Tănase (born 1971) | 25 September 2009 | 6 May 2011 | Filat I–II |
| 10 | | Oleg Efrim (born 1975) | 6 May 2011 | 18 February 2015 | Filat II; Leancă |
| 10 | | Vladimir Grosu (born 1975) | 18 February 2015 | 30 July 2015 | Gaburici |
| 11 | | Vladimir Cebotari (born 1980) | 30 July 2015 | 21 December 2017 | Streleț; Filip |
| 12 | | Alexandru Tănase (born 1971) | 10 January 2018 | 19 March 2018 | Filip |
| 13 | | Victoria Iftodi (born 1969) | 19 March 2018 | 8 June 2019 | Filip |
| 14 | | Stanislav Pavlovschi (born 1955) | 8 June 2019 | 23 June 2019 | Sandu |
| 15 | | Olesea Stamate (born 1983) | 24 June 2019 | 14 November 2019 | Sandu |
| 16 | | Fadei Nagacevschi (born 1982) | 14 November 2019 | 6 August 2021 | Chicu |
| 17 | | Sergiu Litvinenco (born 1981) | 6 August 2021 | 16 February 2023 | Gavrilița |
| 18 | | Veronica Mihailov-Moraru (born 1982) | 16 February 2023 | 1 November 2025 | Recean |
| 19 | | Vladislav Cojuhari (born 1985) | 1 November 2025 | Incumbent | Munteanu Tofan |

== See also ==
- Justice ministry
- Politics of Moldova
