= Valeria Șterbeț =

Moldovan judge and politician (born 1946)

Valeria Șterbeț OR

Judge of the Constitutional Court
- In office 23 February 2007 – 25 February 2013

Minister of Justice
- In office 21 December 1999 – 19 April 2001
- President: Petru Lucinschi; Vladimir Voronin
- Prime Minister: Dumitru Braghiș
- Preceded by: Ion Păduraru
- Succeeded by: Ion Morei

Personal details
- Born: 15 November 1946 (age 79) Miciurin, Moldavian SSR, Soviet Union

Valeria Șterbeț (born 15 November 1946) is a former Moldovan judge and politician. She served as Minister of Justice from 1999 to 2001.

Political offices
Preceded by Ion Păduraru	Minister of Justice; 1999–2001	Succeeded by Ion Morei
