= Fadei Nagacevschi =

Moldovan politician (born 1982)

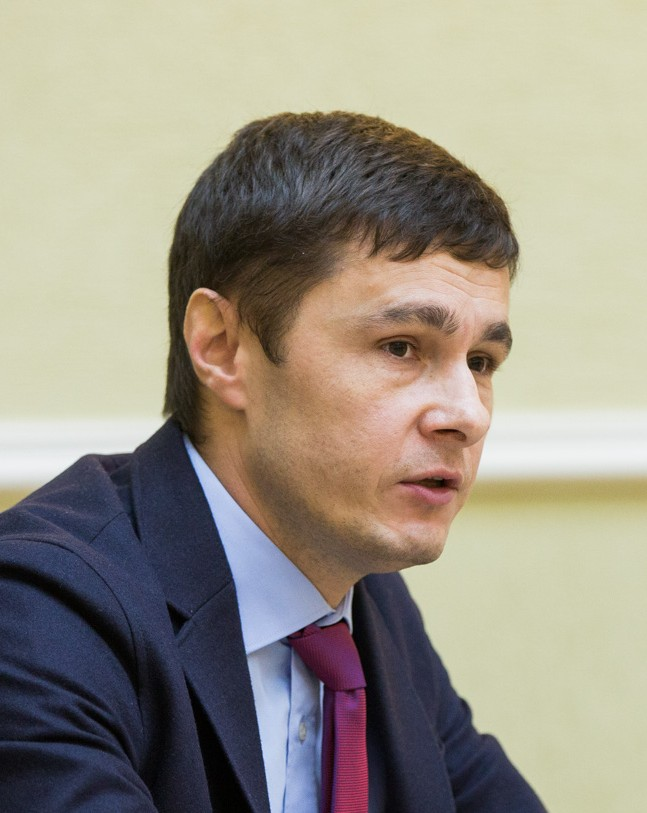
- Nagacevschi in 2019

Deputy Mayor of Chișinău
- In office 8 November 2021 – 4 October 2022
- Succeeded by: Irina Gutnic

Minister of Justice
- In office 14 November 2019 – 6 August 2021
- President: Igor Dodon; Maia Sandu
- Prime Minister: Ion Chicu; Aureliu Ciocoi (acting)
- Preceded by: Olesea Stamate
- Succeeded by: Sergiu Litvinenco

Personal details
- Born: 30 December 1982 (age 43) Chișinău, Moldavian SSR, Soviet Union
- Education: Moldova State University

Fadei Nagacevschi (born 30 December 1982) is a Moldovan politician. He served as Minister of Justice from 14 November 2019 to 5 August 2021 in the cabinet of Prime Minister Ion Chicu.

He previously served as advisor to the President of Parliament of the Republic of Moldova.

He has a bachelor's degree and master's degree in law from Moldova State University.

Political offices
Preceded by Olesea Stamate	Minister of Justice; 2019–2021	Succeeded by Sergiu Litvinenco
