= Ion Morei =

Moldovan politician (born 1955)

Minister of Justice
- In office 19 April 2001 – 12 February 2003
- President: Vladimir Voronin
- Prime Minister: Vasile Tarlev
- Preceded by: Valeria Șterbeț
- Succeeded by: Vasile Dolghieru

Member of the Moldovan Parliament
- In office 21 April 1998 – 19 April 2001
- Succeeded by: Mihai Petrache
- Parliamentary group: For a Democratic and Prosperous Moldova Electoral Bloc; Braghiș Alliance

Personal details
- Born: 13 September 1955 (age 70) Kurgan, Russian SFSR, Soviet Union

Ion Morei (born 13 September 1955) is a Moldovan attorney. He was the Minister of Justice of Moldova in the first cabinet (2001–2005) of Prime Minister Vasile Tarlev. He served from April 19, 2001, until February 12, 2003, when he was replaced as minister by Vasile Dolghieru.

Political offices
Preceded by Valeria Șterbeț	Minister of Justice; 2001–2003	Succeeded by Vasile Dolghieru
