= Căbăiești =

- Village
- Location within Moldova
- Coordinates: 47.2180555556°N 28.1472222222°E
- Country: Moldova
- District: Călărași

Government
  - Mayor: Vasile Crudu (PDM)

Population (2014 census)
  - Total: 929
- Time zone: UTC+2 (EET)
  - Summer (DST): UTC+3 (EEST)

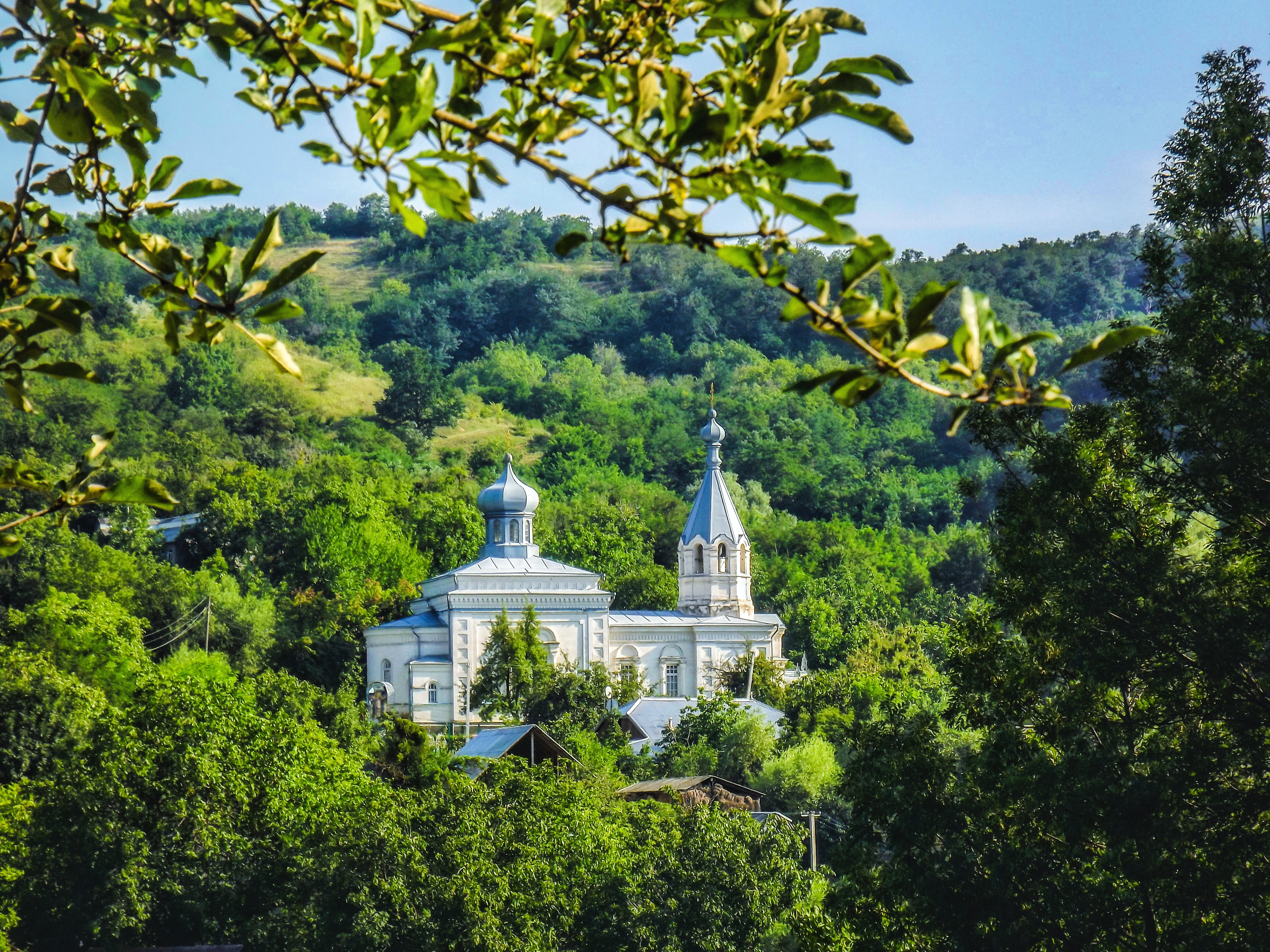
Church of the Protection of the Virgin Mary, Cabaiești

Căbăiești is a village in Călărași District, Moldova.
