= Cornești (village), Ungheni =

Cornești
- Village
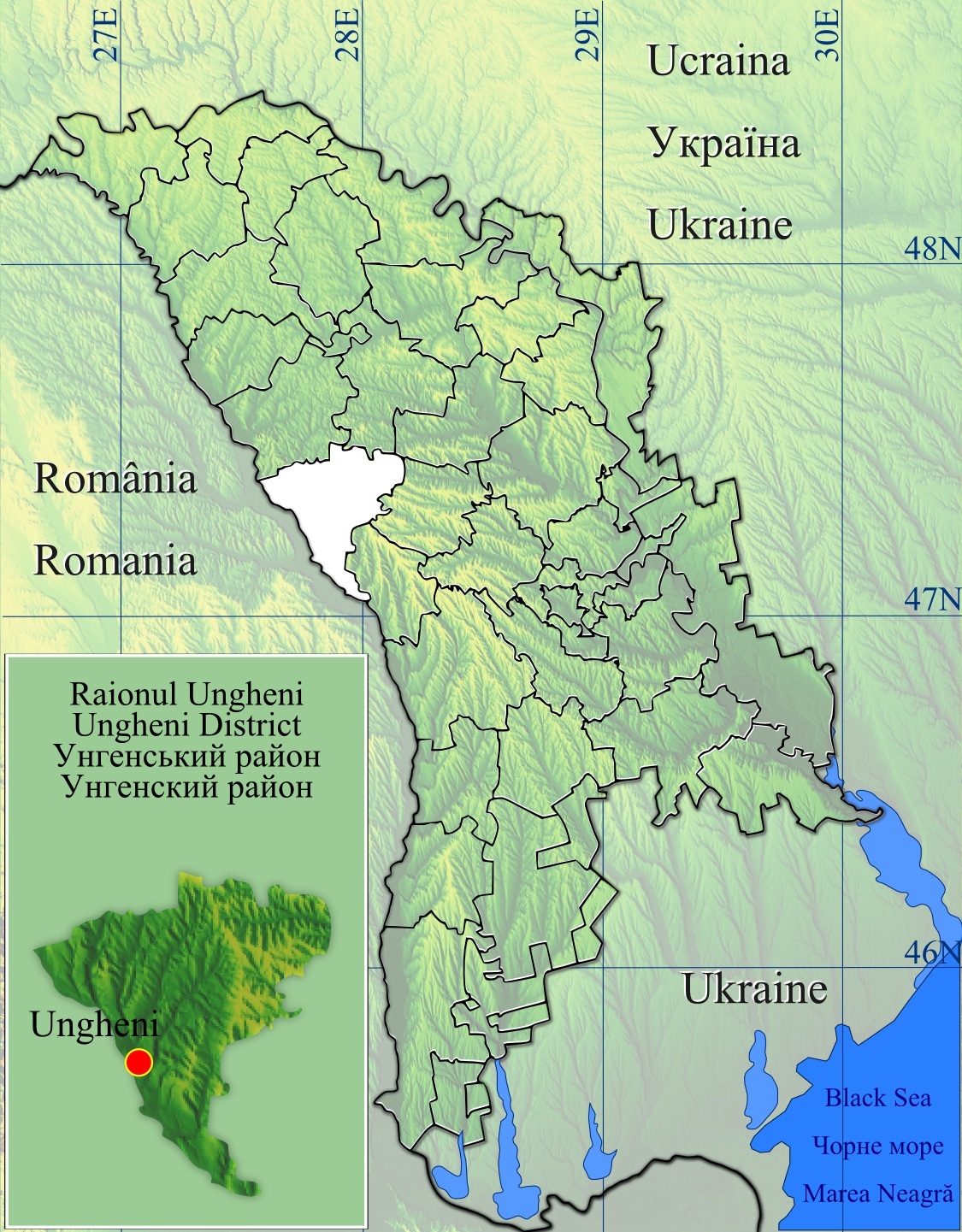
- Location within Ungheni
- Coordinates: 47°22′3″N 27°59′58″E
- Country: Moldova

Government
  - Mayor: Valeriu Morari (PDM)

Population (2014 census)
  - Total: 1,945
- Time zone: UTC+2 (EET)
  - Summer (DST): UTC+3 (EEST)
- Postal code: MD-3621

Cornești is a village (sat) in Ungheni District, in left central Moldova, with a population of 2,038 at the 2004 census.
