= Basarabeasca District =

Coordinates: 46°25′N 28°55′E

Basarabeasca
- District (Raion)
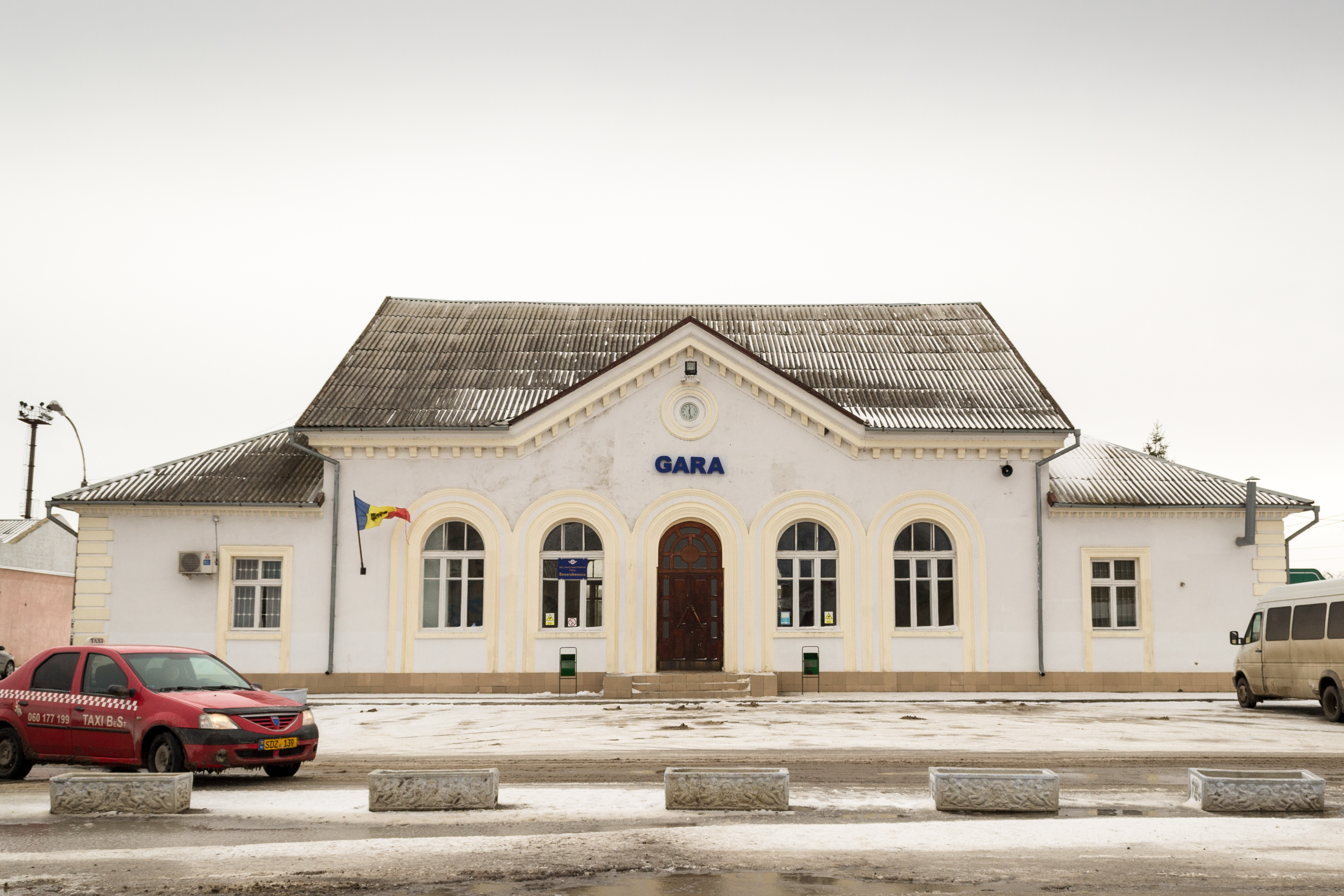
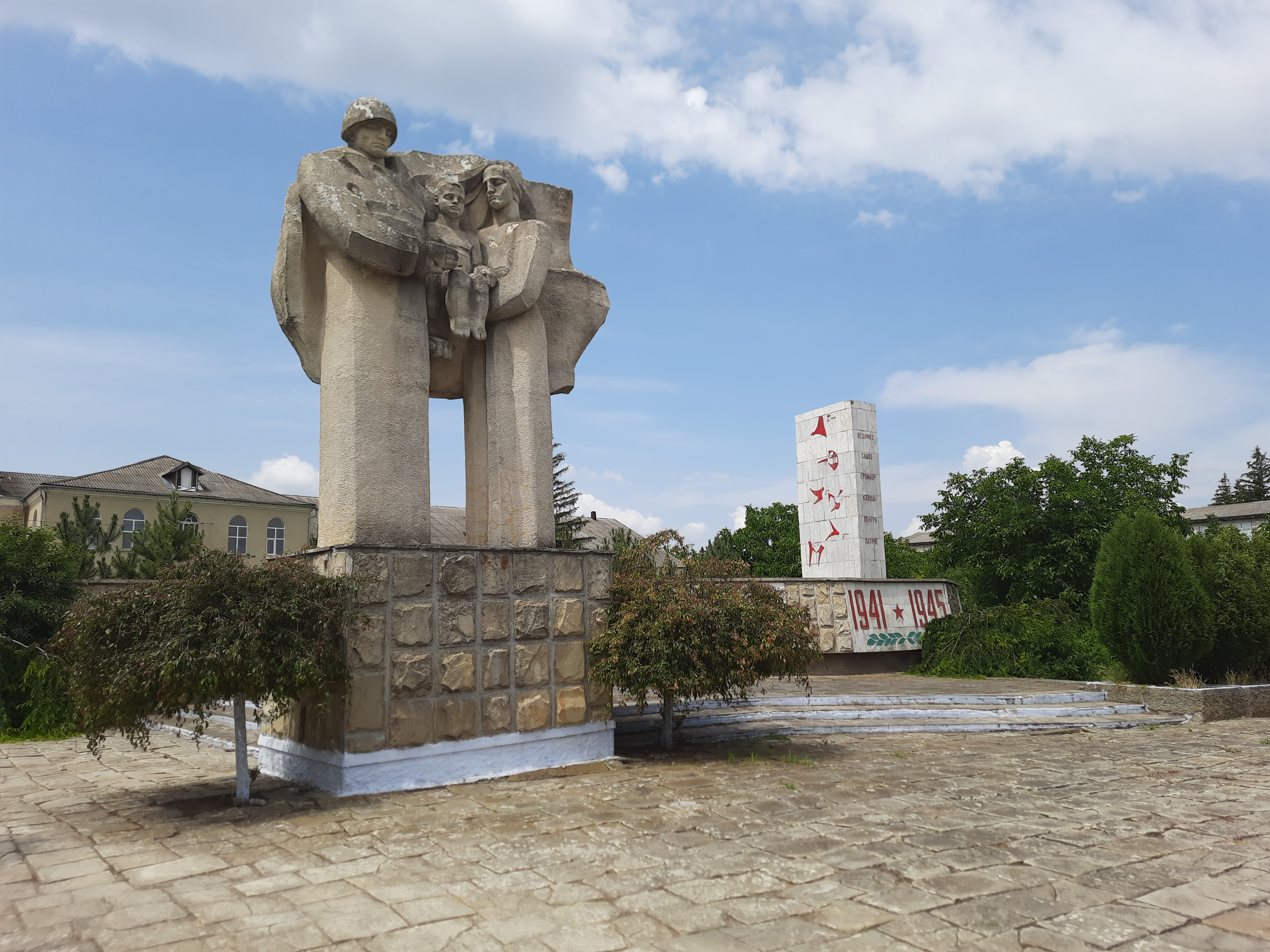
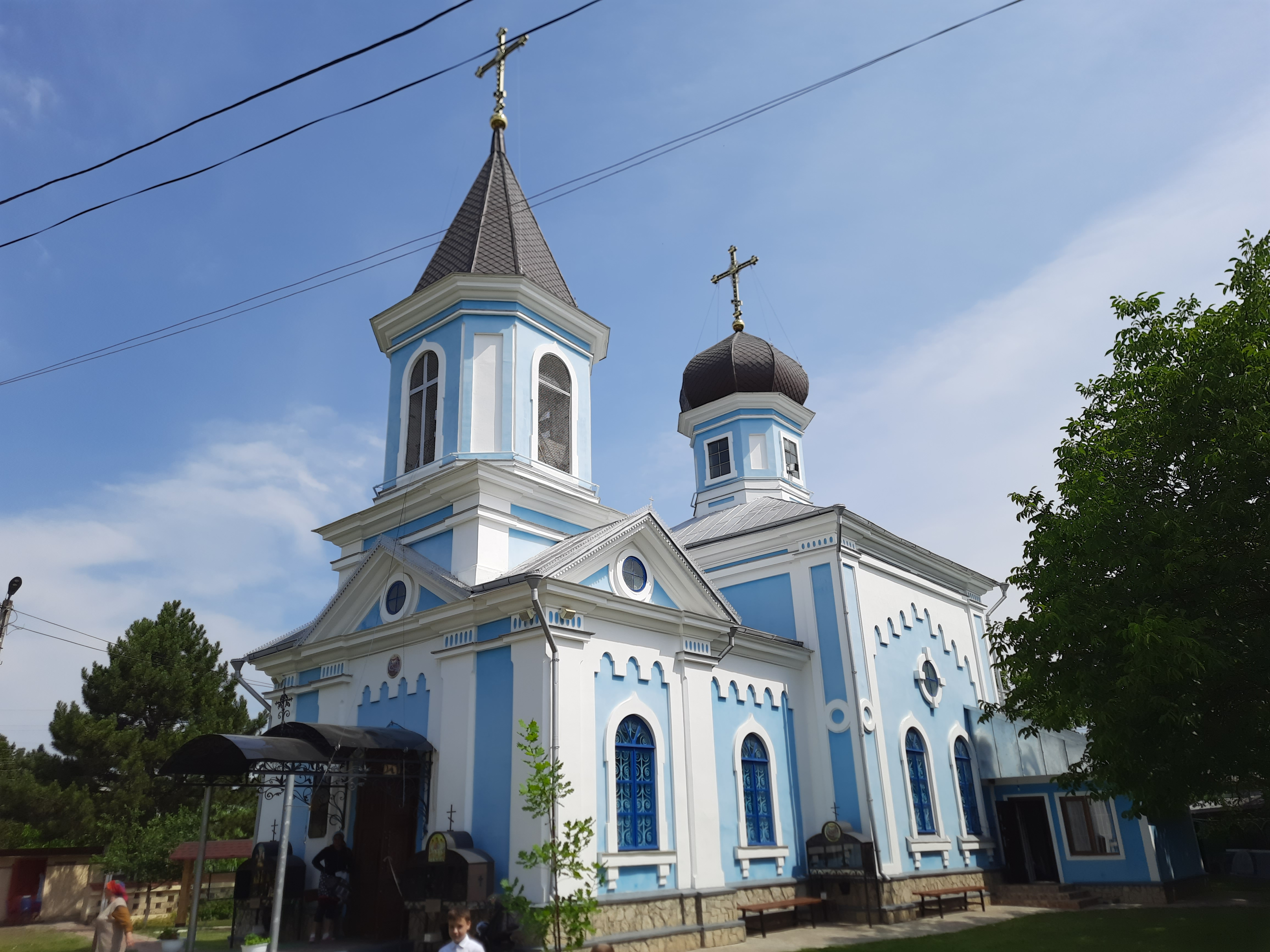
- From the top, Train station in Basarabeasca, Abaclua World War II Memorial, Church of the Nativity of the Virgin Mary

- Flag Coat of arms

- Country: Republic of Moldova
- Administrative center (Oraş-reşedinţă): Basarabeasca
- Established: 2002

Government
  - Raion President: Natalia Cara (PSRM), since 2024

Area
  - Total: 295 km^{2} (114 sq mi)

Population (2025)
  - Total: 15,676
  - Density: 53.1/km^{2} (138/sq mi)
- Time zone: UTC+2 (EET)
  - Summer (DST): UTC+3 (EEST)
- Area code: +373 67
- Car plates: BS
- Website: basarabeasca.md

Basarabeasca (Romanian pronunciation: [basaraˈbe̯aska]) is a raion in the south of Moldova, with the administrative center at Basarabeasca.

== History ==
From 1393 to 1538, the region was part of the principality of Moldavia. In the 16th, 17th and 18th centuries, the region was populated by Tatars. Localities with the oldest documentary attestation is Sadaclia, documented for the first time in 1793. In 1812, after the Russo-Turkish War (1806-1812), is the occupation of Basarabia, Russian Empire during this period (1812–1917), there is an intense russification of the native population. In 1918, after the collapse of the Russian Empire, Bessarabia united with Romania. During this period (1918–1940 and 1941–1944), the district was part of Tighina County. After the 1939 Molotov–Ribbentrop Pact, Bessarabia was occupied by the USSR in June 1940. In 1991 as a result of the proclamation of Independence of Moldova, the district became part of Lăpușna County (1991–2003), and in 2003 it became an administrative unit of Moldova.

== Geography ==
District is located in the southern part of the Republic of Moldova. Neighborhood has the following district: north Cimislia District, the east boundary of the state with Ukraine, in the west and south bordering of Gagauzia. Also the district is the smallest area and population of Moldova was. The landscape of the field with maximum altitudes of 210–220 m with a mild erosion processes.

=== Climate ===
Temperate continental climate with an annual average district temperature of 10 °C (50 °F). In July the average temperature is 23 °C (73 °F), and in January −3 °C (27 °F). The annual precipitation is 450–550 mm, and the average wind speed is 2–5 m/s.

=== Fauna ===
Typical European fauna, with the presence of mammals such as foxes, hedgehogs, deer, wild boar, polecat, wild cat, ermine, and others, and birds such as partridges, crows, eagles, starling, swallow, and more.

=== Flora ===
Forests of the district are complemented by tree species such as oak, ash, hornbeam, linden, maple, walnut and others. From plants: wormwood, knotweed, fescue, nettle and many others.

=== Rivers ===
District is located in Cogâlnic River basin (243 km) which crosses the district from northwest to southeast. Most lakes are of artificial origin.

== Administrative subdivisions ==
- Localities: 10
  - Administrative center: Basarabeasca
    - Cities: Basarabeasca
      - Communes: 1
        Iserlia (Bogdanovca
        Carabiber
        Ivanovca)
        - Villages: 9
          Abaclia
          Bașcalia
          Carabetovca
          Iordanovca
          Iserlia
          Sadaclia
          Bogdanovca
          Carabiber
          Ivanovca

== Demographics ==
Historical population
Year	Pop.	±%
1959	24,814	—
1970	27,776	+11.9%
1979	29,889	+7.6%
1989	31,612	+5.8%
2004	28,978	−8.3%
2014	19,950	−31.2%
2024	14,914	−25.2%
Source: National Bureau of Statistics of the Republic of Moldova

As of 2025, the population is 15,676, of which 44.3% is male and 55.7% is female. 42.9% of the population is urban and 57.1% is rural.

- Births (2010): 241 (8.2 per 1000)
- Deaths (2010): 389 (13.3 per 1000)
- Growth rate (2010): -148 (−5.1 per 1000)

=== Ethnic groups ===
Ethnic groups (2024 census)
Ethnic group	Number	%
Moldovans *	9,754	65.4
Gagauz	1,222	8.2
Russians	1,119	7.5
Romanians *	883	5.9
Ukrainians	871	5.8
Bulgarians	777	5.2
Romani	168	1.1
Other	111	0.7
Undeclared	9	0.1
Total	14,914	100

Footnote: * There is an ongoing controversy regarding the ethnic identification of Moldovans and Romanians.

=== Religion ===
Religion (2024 census)
Religion	Number	%
Christians	14,717	98.7
Orthodox Christians	14,200	95.2
Baptists	230	1.5
Adventists	152	1.0
Pentecostals	66	0.4
Evangelicals	30	0.2
Jehovah's Witnesses	27	0.2
Catholics	11	0.1
Old Believers	1	0.0
Muslims	7	0.0
Free thinkers	2	0.0
Agnostics	5	0.0
Atheists	31	0.2
Irreligious	90	0.6
Other	6	0.0
Undeclared	56	0.4
Total	14,914	100

== Economy ==
Activities that contribute to the economy of the district are: trade (81%), paid services (18%), agriculture and manufacturing (1%). Of the total number of SME's which have 94.3% of all businesses in the district are recorded with only 50% profit. The local economy is based on sectors: manufacturing, trade and services, transport and communications. Small and medium business sector of the district lies Basarabeasca 99% of all enterprises in the district and 47.9% of all workers already employed.

== Education ==
The district Basarabeasca operates 11 educational institutions, including: total students: in schools – 4234 children. Four secondary schools – 749 children, seven high schools – 3485 children. Institutions, school children −1014. School sports – 233 children.

== Politics ==
Traditional Basarabeasca district, political and electoral support PCRM unlike the south part of Moldova. But the last three elections communists is a continuous fall in percentage.

During the last three elections AEI had an increase of 131.8%

Parliament elections results
Year	AEI	PCRM
2010	43.86% 5,519	50.20% 6,317
July 2009	36.83% 4,716	52.05% 6,496
April 2009	19.70% 2,381	53.61% 6,749

=== Elections ===
Summary of 28 November 2010 Parliament of Moldova election results in Basarabeasca District
Parties and coalitions	Votes	%	+/−
Party of Communists of the Republic of Moldova	6,317	50.20	−1.85
Liberal Democratic Party of Moldova	3,219	25.58	+12.33
Democratic Party of Moldova	1,619	12,87	+2.38
Party Alliance Our Moldova	345	2.74	−4.82
Liberal Party	336	2.67	−2.83
Humanist Party of Moldova	151	1.20	+1.20
Other Party	602	4.74	-6.38
Total (turnout 73.55%)	12,699	100.00	

== Culture ==
The district operates 8 cultural units, 2 museums, three bands, holding the title of the band model, 14 public libraries and the Monastery "St. Nicholas".

== Health ==
The district of Basarabeasca currently provides: a district hospital, a center of family doctors (which staffed by four doctors in the practice of family medicine), four general health centers, an emergency medical facility, two dental surgeries, and six pharmacies.

== Bibliography ==
- District population per year
- District site
- Discuție:Raionul Basarabeasca
- Rezultatele alegerilor din 28 noiembrie 2010 în raionul Basarabeasca
