= List of heads of government of Moldova =

Moldovan government list

This is a list of heads of government of Moldova from the establishment of the office in 1917 to the present day.

== Moldavian Democratic Republic (1917–1918) ==
Parties

Socialist Revolutionary Party National Moldavian Party

Status

No.	Portrait	Name (Birth–Death)	Office term		Political party
1		Pantelimon Erhan (1884–1971)	7/20 December 1917	13/26 January 1918	Socialist Revolutionary Party
2		Daniel Ciugureanu (1885–1950)	16/29 January 1918	8/21 April 1918	National Moldavian Party
3		Petru Cazacu (1873–1956)	9/22 April 1918	29 November/12 December 1918	National Moldavian Party

== Moldavian Soviet Socialist Republic (1940–1991) ==
=== Chairmen of the Council of People's Commissars ===
No.	Portrait	Name (Birth–Death)	Office term	
1		Tihon Konstantinov (1898–1957)	2 August 1940	17 April 1945
2		Nicolae Coval (1904–1970)	17 April 1945	4 January 1946
3		Gherasim Rudi (1907–1982)	5 January 1946	4 April 1946

=== Chairmen of the Council of Ministers ===
No.	Portrait	Name (Birth–Death)	Office term	
1		Gherasim Rudi (1907–1982)	4 April 1946	23 January 1958
2		Alexandru Diordiță (1911–1996)	23 January 1958	15 April 1970
3		Petru Pascari (1929–2025)	24 April 1970	1 August 1976
4		Semion Grossu (born 1934)	1 August 1976	30 December 1980
5		Ion Ustian (born 1939)	30 December 1980	24 December 1985
6		Ivan Calin (1935–2012)	24 December 1985	10 January 1990
7		Petru Pascari (1929–2025)	10 January 1990	26 May 1990
8		Mircea Druc (born 1941)	26 May 1990	28 May 1991
9		Valeriu Muravschi (1949–2020)	28 May 1991	27 August 1991

== Republic of Moldova (1991–present) ==
Parties

FPM PDAM ADR PCRM PLDM PL PAS Independent

Status

Acting prime minister

No.	Portrait	Name (born–died)	Term of office			Political party	Prior office	Election	Cabinet (coalition)
No.	Portrait	Name (born–died)	Took office	Left office	Time in office	Political party	Prior office	Election	Cabinet (coalition)
1		Valeriu Muravschi (1949–2020)	27 August 1991	1 July 1992	1 year, 34 days	Popular Front	Prime Minister of SSR Moldova	—	Muravschi; FPM
2		Andrei Sangheli (born 1944)	1 July 1992	24 January 1997	4 years, 207 days	Democratic Agrarian Party	First Deputy Prime Minister & Minister of Agriculture and Food Industry	—	Sangheli I
2		Andrei Sangheli (born 1944)	1 July 1992	24 January 1997	4 years, 207 days	Democratic Agrarian Party	First Deputy Prime Minister & Minister of Agriculture and Food Industry	1994	Sangheli II
3		Ion Ciubuc (1943–2018)	24 January 1997	1 February 1999	2 years, 8 days	Alliance for Democracy and Reforms	President of the Court of Accounts	—	Ciubuc I
3		Ion Ciubuc (1943–2018)	24 January 1997	1 February 1999	2 years, 8 days	Alliance for Democracy and Reforms	President of the Court of Accounts	1998	Ciubuc II
–		Ion Sturza (born 1960)	19 February 1999	12 March 1999	21 days	Alliance for Democracy and Reforms	Deputy Prime Minister & Minister of Economy and Reforms	—	Ciubuc II
4		Ion Sturza (born 1960)	12 March 1999	21 December 1999	284 days	Alliance for Democracy and Reforms	Deputy Prime Minister & Minister of Economy and Reforms	—	Sturza
5		Dumitru Braghiș (born 1957)	21 December 1999	19 April 2001	1 year, 119 days	Independent	First Deputy Minister of Economy and Reforms	—	Braghiș
6		Vasile Tarlev (born 1963)	19 April 2001	31 March 2008	6 years, 347 days	Party of Communists	—	2001	Tarlev I PCRM
6		Vasile Tarlev (born 1963)	19 April 2001	31 March 2008	6 years, 347 days	Party of Communists	—	2005	Tarlev II; PCRM
7		Zinaida Greceanîi (born 1956)	31 March 2008	14 September 2009	1 year, 167 days	Party of Communists	First Deputy Prime Minister	—	Greceanîi I PCRM
7		Zinaida Greceanîi (born 1956)	31 March 2008	14 September 2009	1 year, 167 days	Party of Communists	First Deputy Prime Minister	Apr. 2009	Greceanîi II; PCRM
—		Vitalie Pîrlog (born 1974) acting	14 September 2009	25 September 2009	11 days	Party of Communists	Minister of Justice	—	Greceanîi II; PCRM
8		Vlad Filat (born 1969)	25 September 2009	25 April 2013	3 years, 212 days	Liberal Democratic Party (Alliance for European Integration)	Minister of State	Jul. 2009	Filat I PLDM–PL–PDM–AMN
8		Vlad Filat (born 1969)	25 September 2009	25 April 2013	3 years, 212 days	Liberal Democratic Party (Alliance for European Integration)	Minister of State	2010	Filat II; PLDM–PL–PDM
–		Iurie Leancă (born 1963)	25 April 2013	30 May 2013	35 days	Liberal Democratic Party (Pro-European Coalition)	Deputy Prime Minister & Minister of Foreign Affairs and European Integration	—	Filat II; PLDM–PL–PDM
9		Iurie Leancă (born 1963)	30 May 2013	18 February 2015	1 year, 264 days	Liberal Democratic Party (Pro-European Coalition)	Deputy Prime Minister & Minister of Foreign Affairs and European Integration	—	Leancă; PLDM–PDM–PL
10		Chiril Gaburici (born 1976)	18 February 2015	22 June 2015	124 days	Independent	—	2014	Gaburici; PLDM–PDM
—		Natalia Gherman (born 1969) acting	22 June 2015	30 July 2015	38 days	Liberal Democratic Party (Political Alliance for a European Moldova)	Deputy Prime Minister & Minister of Foreign Affairs and European Integration	—	Gaburici; PLDM–PDM
11		Valeriu Streleț (born 1970)	30 July 2015	30 October 2015	92 days	Liberal Democratic Party (Alliance for European Integration III)	Member of Parliament	—	Streleț; PLDM–PDM–PL
—		Gheorghe Brega (born 1951) acting	30 October 2015	20 January 2016	82 days	Liberal Party (Alliance for European Integration III)	Deputy Prime Minister for Social Affairs	—	Streleț; PLDM–PDM–PL
12		Pavel Filip (born 1966)	20 January 2016	8 June 2019	3 years, 139 days	Democratic Party	Minister of Information Technology and Communications	—	Filip; PDM–PL→PPEM
13		Maia Sandu (born 1972)	8 June 2019	14 November 2019	159 days	Party of Action and Solidarity	Minister of Education	2019	Sandu; ACUM–PSRM
14		Ion Chicu (born 1972)	14 November 2019	31 December 2020	1 year, 47 days	Independent	Minister of Finance	—	Chicu; PSRM–PDM
—		Aureliu Ciocoi (born 1968) acting	31 December 2020	6 August 2021	218 days	Independent	Minister of Foreign Affairs and European Integration	—	Chicu; PSRM–PDM
15		Natalia Gavrilița (born 1977)	6 August 2021	16 February 2023	1 year, 194 days	Party of Action and Solidarity	Minister of Finance	2021	Gavrilița; PAS
16		Dorin Recean (born 1974)	16 February 2023	1 November 2025	2 years, 258 days	Independent (Note: Although remaining independent, Recean ran on the Party of Action and Solidarity list in the 2025 parliamentary election, resigning from his won seat shortly after.)	Minister of Internal Affairs	—	Recean; PAS
17		Alexandru Munteanu (born 1964)	1 November 2025	8 July 2026	249 days	Independent	—	2025	Munteanu; PAS
—		Eugen Osmochescu (born 1972) acting	8 July 2026	22 July 2026	14 days	Independent	Deputy Prime Minister & Minister of Economic Development and Digitalization	—	Munteanu; PAS
18		Vasile Tofan (born 1982)	22 July 2026	Incumbent	76 days	Independent	—	—	Tofan; PAS

== See also ==
- Prime Minister of Moldova
- President of Moldova
