= Andrei Uncuța =

Moldovan physician and politician

Secretary of State of the Ministry of Health
- In office 8 June 2026 – 16 September 2026
- President: Maia Sandu
- Prime Minister: Alexandru Munteanu; Eugen Osmochescu (acting); Vasile Tofan
- Minister: Emil Ceban; Alexandru Gasnaș

Director of the Timofei Moșneaga Republican Clinical Hospital
- In office 7 July 2020 – 8 June 2026
- Preceded by: Anatol Ciubotaru

Deputy Minister of Health
- In office 3 June 2015 – 12 August 2015
- President: Nicolae Timofti
- Prime Minister: Chiril Gaburici; Natalia Gherman (acting); Valeriu Streleț
- Minister: Mircea Buga; Ruxanda Glavan

Personal details
- Born: 3 May 1973 (age 53) Ungheni, Moldavian SSR, Soviet Union
- Education: Nicolae Testemițanu State University of Medicine and Pharmacy

Andrei Uncuța (born 3 May 1973) is a Moldovan neurologist and healthcare administrator.
