= First Tarlev Cabinet =

Government of Moldova

The First Tarlev Cabinet was the Cabinet of Moldova from 19 April 2001 to 19 April 2005. It was the first government led by Vasile Tarlev who was the Prime Minister of Moldova from 2001 to 2008.

== Composition ==
=== Ministers ===
Title	Image	Name	Party	Term start	Term end
Prime Minister		Vasile Tarlev	PCRM	19 April 2001	31 March 2008
First Deputy Prime Minister		Vasile Iovv	Independent	31 January 2002	19 April 2005
Deputy Prime Minister, Minister of Agriculture and Food Industry		Dmitri Todoroglo	Independent	19 April 2001	19 April 2005
Deputy Prime Minister, Minister of Economy		Andrei Cucu	Independent	15 March 2000	4 February 2002
Deputy Prime Minister, Minister of Economy		Ștefan Odagiu	Independent	16 May 2002	2 June 2003
Deputy Prime Minister, Minister of Economy		Marian Lupu	PCRM	5 August 2003	24 March 2005
Deputy Prime Minister		Valerian Cristea	PCRM	19 April 2001	15 November 2006
Deputy Prime Minister		Andrei Stratan	PCRM	21 December 2004	25 September 2009
Minister of Foreign Affairs		Nicolae Cernomaz	Independent	22 November 2000	27 July 2001
Minister of Foreign Affairs		Nicolae Dudău	Independent	3 September 2001	4 February 2004
Minister of Foreign Affairs		Andrei Stratan	PCRM	4 February 2004	25 September 2009
Minister of Industry		Mihail Garștea	Independent	19 April 2001	19 April 2005
Minister of Energy		Ion Leșanu	Independent	21 December 1999	27 July 2001
Minister of Energy		Iacov Timciuc	PCRM	8 August 2001	19 April 2005
Minister of Finance		Mihail Manoli	Independent	19 April 2001	7 February 2002
Minister of Finance		Zinaida Greceanîi	PCRM	26 February 2002	19 April 2005
Minister of Environment, Public Works and Regional Development		Gheorghe Duca	PDM	19 April 2001	5 February 2004
Minister of Environment, Public Works and Regional Development		Constantin Mihăilescu	Independent	19 March 2004	27 February 2008
Minister of Justice		Ion Morei	Independent	19 April 2001	12 February 2003
Minister of Justice		Vasile Dolghieru	Independent	12 February 2003	8 July 2004
Minister of Justice		Victoria Iftodi	Independent	8 July 2004	20 September 2006
Minister of Internal Affairs		Vasile Drăgănel	Independent	19 April 2001	27 February 2002
Minister of Internal Affairs		Gheorghe Papuc	PCRM	27 February 2002	31 March 2008
Minister of Defense		Victor Gaiciuc	PCRM	19 April 2001	15 October 2004
Minister of Defense		Valeriu Pleșca	MPSFN	29 December 2004	11 June 2007
Minister of Reintegration		Vasilii Șova	PCRM	12 December 2002	11 September 2009
Minister of Transport and Communication		Victor Țopa	Independent	19 April 2001	12 December 2001
Minister of Transport and Communication		Anatol Cupțov	Independent	12 December 2001	13 November 2002
Minister of Transport and Communication		Vasile Zgardan	Independent	5 December 2002	19 April 2005
Minister of Education		Ilie Vancea	Independent	22 November 2000	26 February 2002
Minister of Education		Gheorghe Sima	PM	26 February 2002	2 July 2003
Minister of Education		Valentin Beniuc	Independent	5 August 2003	19 April 2005
Minister of Culture		Ion Păcuraru	Independent	19 April 2001	23 December 2002
Minister of Culture		Veaceslav Madan	Independent	23 December 2002	19 April 2005
Minister of Labour and Social Protection		Valerian Revenco	Independent	21 December 1999	19 April 2005
Minister of Health		Andrei Gherman	Independent	19 April 2001	19 April 2005

=== Ex officio members ===
Governor of Gagauzia. The Başkan (Governor) of Gagauzia is elected by universal, equal, direct, secret and free suffrage on an alternative basis for a term of 4 years. One and the same person can be a governor for no more than two consecutive terms. The Başkan of Gagauzia is confirmed as a member of the Moldovan government by a decree of the President of Moldova.

Title	Image	Name	Party	Term start	Term end
Governor of Gagauzia		Dumitru Croitor	Independent	24 September 1999	21 June 2002
Governor of Gagauzia		Gheorghe Tabunșcic	PCRM	9 November 2002	29 December 2006
Mayor of Chișinău		Serafim Urechean	AMN	9 August 1994	18 April 2005
President of the Academy of Sciences of Moldova		Gheorghe Duca	PDM	24 August 2004	28 November 2018

Preceded by Braghiș Cabinet	Cabinet of Moldova; 19 April 2001 - 19 April 2005	Succeeded by Second Tarlev Cabinet
