= Cabinet of Moldova =

Chief executive body of the Government of Moldova

Cabinet of Ministers of the Republic of Moldova
- Romanian: Cabinetul de miniștri al Republicii Moldova
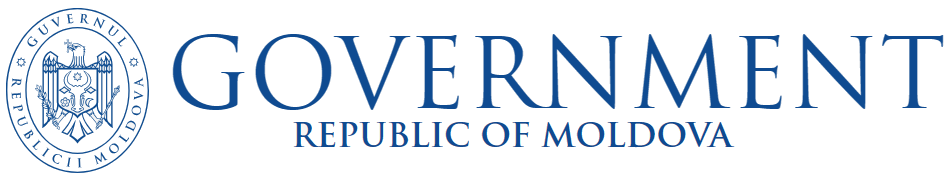

Overview
- Established: May 23, 1990 (36 years ago)
- State: Moldova
- Country: Moldova
- Leader: Prime Minister
- Appointed by: President (Parliament's nomination)
- Main organ: Cabinet of Moldova
- Ministries: 14
- Responsible to: Parliament of Moldova
- Headquarters: Government House, Chișinău
- Website: gov.md/en

The Cabinet of Ministers of the Republic of Moldova (Romanian: Cabinetul de miniștri al Republicii Moldova) is the chief executive body of the Government of Moldova. Its function according to the Constitution of Moldova is "to carry out the domestic and foreign policy of the State and to apply general control over the work of public administration".

== Structure of the cabinet ==
The Constitution states that "The Government consists of a Prime Minister, a first Deputy Prime Minister, Deputy Prime Ministers, Ministers and other cabinet Members, as determined by organic law,"..

Moldova is a republic with a democratically elected government, acting according to the principles of parliamentarism.

Legislative power is vested in the Parliament. Executive affairs of government are decided by the cabinet.

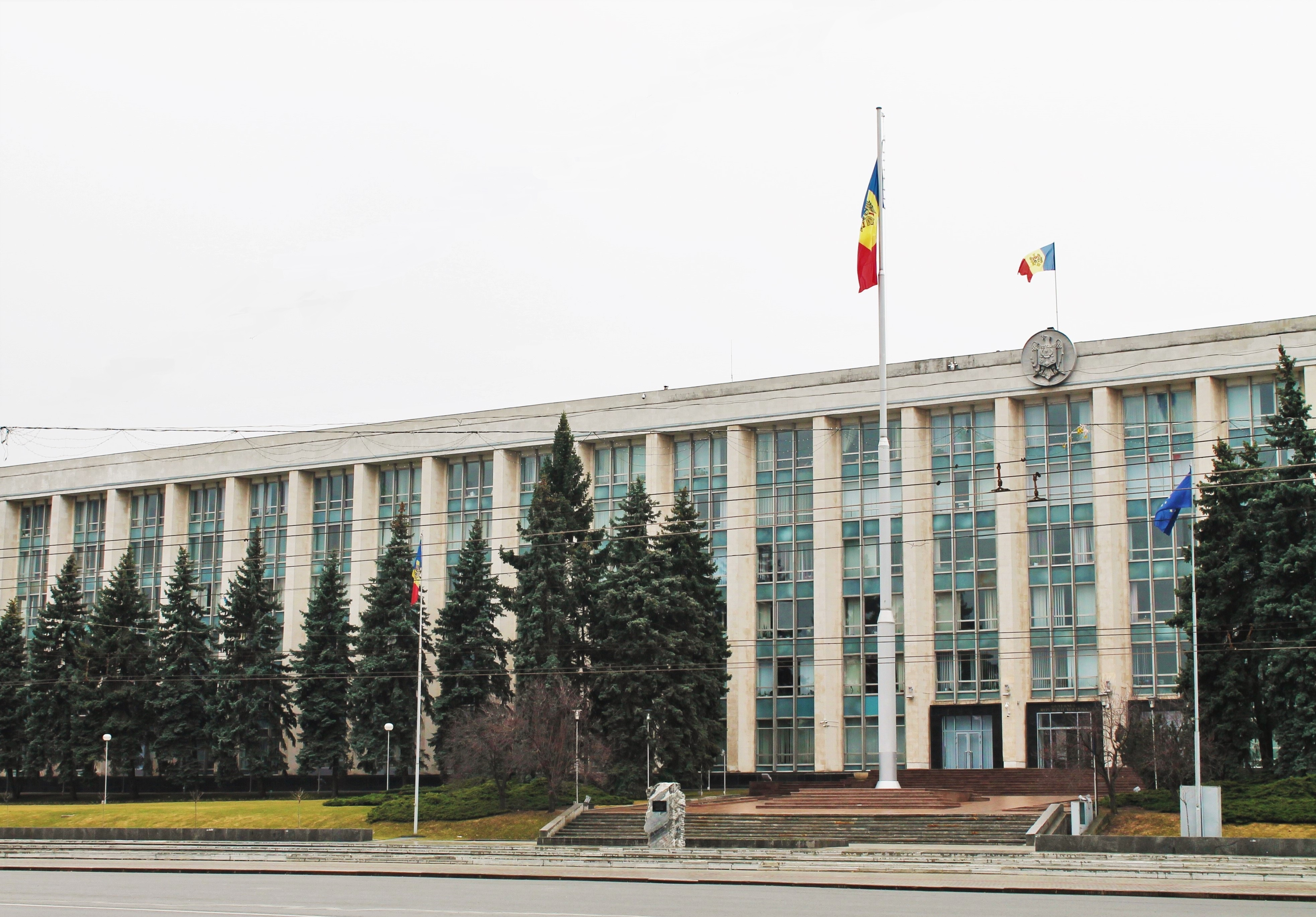
Government House, Chișinău

The composition of the cabinet is decided by the Prime Minister. The current number of ministries is 14.

=== Ministries ===
The 14 ministries of the Cabinet of Moldova are:

- Ministry of Agriculture and Food Industry
- Ministry of Culture
- Ministry of Defense
- Ministry of Economic Development and Digitalization
- Ministry of Education and Research
- Ministry of Energy
- Ministry of Environment
- Ministry of Finance
- Ministry of Foreign Affairs
- Ministry of Health
- Ministry of Infrastructure and Regional Development
- Ministry of Internal Affairs
- Ministry of Justice
- Ministry of Labour and Social Protection

=== State Chancellery ===
The State Chancellery of Moldova (Romanian: Cancelaria de Stat) is a key government body that coordinates policy, manages the Cabinet of Ministers, and oversees public administration reforms. It acts as a central coordinating entity, supporting ministries, implementing action plans, and managing overall government operations and quality management within the public sector.

Its responsibilities include:

- Ensuring draft laws and policies meet standards, develops policy plans, and provides opinions on documents.
- Organizing cabinet meetings, manages records, and arranges activities for the cabinet.
- Leads efforts in civil service modernization.
- Initiates legal reforms for transparent decision-making and public consultation.
- Administers the Bureau for European Integration (BEI), a part of the Chancellery, coordinating the Accession of Moldova to the European Union.

== Governments of Moldova ==
The following is a list of all governments since 1917. It includes the governments of the Moldavian Democratic Republic, which unified with Romania in 1918 shortly after its creation, and the administration of the Moldavian Soviet Socialist Republic, which was a constituent republic of the highly centralized Soviet Union from 1940–1941 and again from 1944–1991.

=== Moldavian Democratic Republic ===
| Government | In function of | Until |
|---|---|---|
| Pantelimon Erhan Cabinet | 21 December 1917 | 6 February 1918 |
| Daniel Ciugureanu Cabinet | 6 February 1918 | 9 April 1918 |
| Petru Cazacu Cabinet | 9 April 1918 | 12 December 1918 |

=== Moldavian Soviet Socialist Republic ===
| Government | In function of | Until |
|---|---|---|
| Tihon Konstantinov Cabinet | 2 August 1940 | 17 April 1945 |
| Nicolae Coval Cabinet | 17 April 1945 | 4 January 1946 |
| Gherasim Rudi Cabinet | 5 January 1946 | 23 January 1958 |
| Alexandru Diordiță Cabinet | 23 January 1958 | 15 April 1970 |
| 1st Petru Pascari Cabinet | 24 April 1970 | 1 August 1976 |
| Semion Grossu Cabinet | 1 August 1976 | 30 December 1980 |
| Ion Ustian Cabinet | 30 December 1980 | 24 December 1985 |
| Ivan Calin Cabinet | 24 December 1985 | 10 January 1990 |
| 2nd Petru Pascari Cabinet | 10 January | 26 May 1990 |
| Mircea Druc Cabinet | 26 May 1990 | 23 May 1991 |

=== Republic of Moldova ===
| Government | In function of | Until |
|---|---|---|
| Mircea Druc Cabinet | 23 May 1990 | 28 May 1991 |
| Valeriu Muravschi Cabinet | 28 May 1991 | 1 July 1992 |
| 1st Andrei Sangheli | 1 July 1992 | 31 March 1994 |
| 2nd Andrei Sangheli | 31 March 1994 | 24 January 1997 |
| 1st Ion Ciubuc Cabinet | 24 January 1997 | 22 May 1998 |
| 2nd Ion Ciubuc Cabinet | 22 May 1998 | 1 February 1999 |
| Ion Sturza Cabinet | 19 February 1999 | 21 December 1999 |
| Dumitru Braghiș Cabinet | 21 December 1999 | 19 April 2001 |
| 1st Vasile Tarlev Cabinet | 19 April 2001 | 19 April 2005 |
| 2nd Vasile Tarlev Cabinet | 19 April 2005 | 31 March 2008 |
| 1st Zinaida Greceanîi Cabinet | 31 March 2008 | 10 June 2009 |
| 2nd Zinaida Greceanîi Cabinet | 10 June 2009 | 25 September 2009 |
| 1st Vlad Filat Cabinet | 25 September 2009 | 14 January 2011 |
| 2nd Vlad Filat Cabinet | 14 January 2011 | 30 May 2013 |
| Iurie Leancă Cabinet | 30 May 2013 | 18 February 2015 |
| Chiril Gaburici Cabinet | 18 February 2015 | 22 June 2015 |
| Valeriu Streleț Cabinet | 30 July 2015 | 30 October 2015 |
| Pavel Filip Cabinet | 20 January 2016 | 8 June 2019 |
| Maia Sandu Cabinet | 8 June 2019 | 14 November 2019 |
| Ion Chicu Cabinet | 14 November 2019 | 6 August 2021 |
| Natalia Gavrilița Cabinet | 6 August 2021 | 16 February 2023 |
| Dorin Recean Cabinet | 16 February 2023 | 1 November 2025 |
| Alexandru Munteanu Cabinet | 1 November 2025 | 22 July 2026 |
| Vasile Tofan Cabinet | 22 July 2026 | Incumbent |

== See also ==
- List of prime ministers of Moldova
- Politics of Moldova
- Government of Moldova
