= Vladimir Hotineanu =

Moldovan surgeon and politician (1950–2019)

Vladimir Hotineanu OR
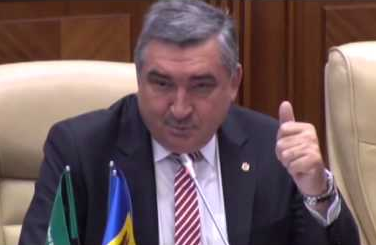
- Hotineanu in 2015

Member of the Moldovan Parliament
- In office 24 December 2010 – 9 March 2019
- Parliamentary group: Liberal Democratic Party; Democratic Party
- In office 22 April 2009 – 25 September 2009
- Succeeded by: Ghenadie Ciobanu
- Parliamentary group: Liberal Democratic Party

Minister of Health
- In office 25 September 2009 – 14 January 2011
- President: Mihai Ghimpu (acting); Vladimir Filat (acting); Marian Lupu (acting)
- Prime Minister: Vladimir Filat
- Preceded by: Larisa Catrinici
- Succeeded by: Andrei Usatîi

Deputy Minister of Health
- In office 15 June 1998 – 27 December 1999
- President: Petru Lucinschi
- Prime Minister: Ion Ciubuc; Ion Sturza; Dumitru Braghiș
- Minister: Eugen Gladun; Vasile Parasca

Personal details
- Born: 1 October 1950 Kyzylorda, Kazakh SSR, Soviet Union
- Died: 15 November 2019 (aged 69) Chișinău, Moldova
- Resting place: Chișinău Central Cemetery
- Party: Liberal Democratic Party of Moldova
- Education: Chișinău State Institute of Medicine
- Profession: physician

Vladimir Hotineanu (1 October 1950 – 15 November 2019) was a Moldovan surgeon and politician. He was the Health Minister of Moldova in the First Vlad Filat Cabinet, and deputy in Moldovan Parliament from 2014 to 2019.

== Biography ==
Hotineanu was born on 1 October 1950 in Kyzylorda, Kazakhstan.

He was a member of the Liberal Democratic Party of Moldova.
