= Mihai Magdei =

Moldovan epidemiologist (born 1945)

Deputy Minister of Health
- In office 20 November 2009 – 8 August 2012
- President: Mihai Ghimpu (acting); Vladimir Filat (acting); Marian Lupu (acting); Nicolae Timofti
- Prime Minister: Vladimir Filat
- Minister: Vladimir Hotineanu; Andrei Usatîi
- In office 5 April 1994 – 24 January 1997
- President: Mircea Snegur; Petru Lucinschi
- Prime Minister: Andrei Sangheli
- Minister: Timofei Moșneaga

Minister of Health
- In office 24 January 1997 – 22 May 1998
- President: Petru Lucinschi
- Prime Minister: Ion Ciubuc
- Preceded by: Timofei Moșneaga
- Succeeded by: Eugen Gladun

Personal details
- Born: 3 October 1945 (age 81)
- Education: Chișinău State Institute of Medicine

Mihai Magdei (born 3 October 1945) is a Moldovan epidemiologist physician and former politician. He served as the Minister of Health of Moldova from 24 January 1997 to 22 May 1998 in the First Ciubuc Cabinet.
