= Munteanu Cabinet =

Government of Moldova

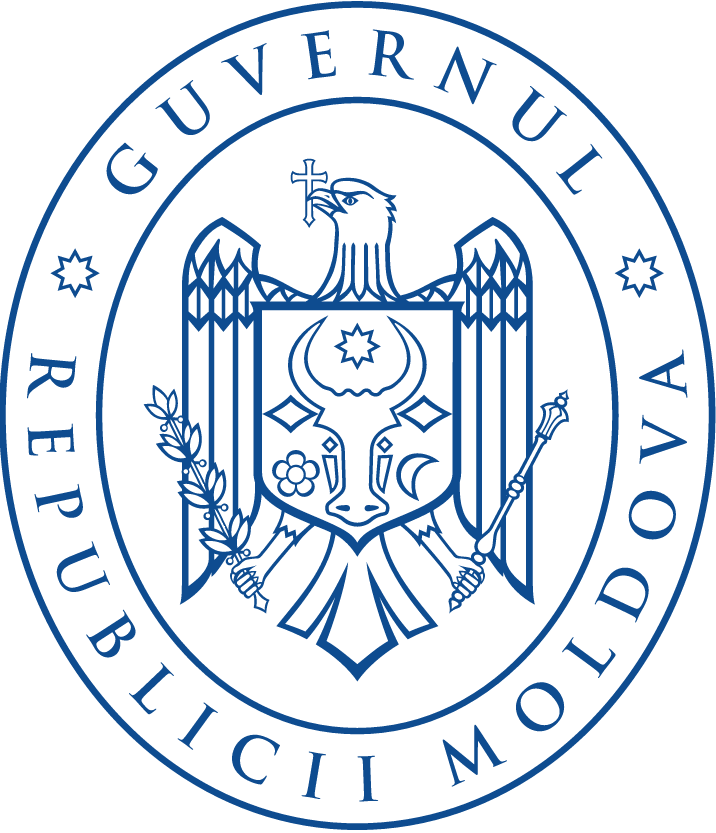
- 22nd Cabinet of Moldova
- Incumbent
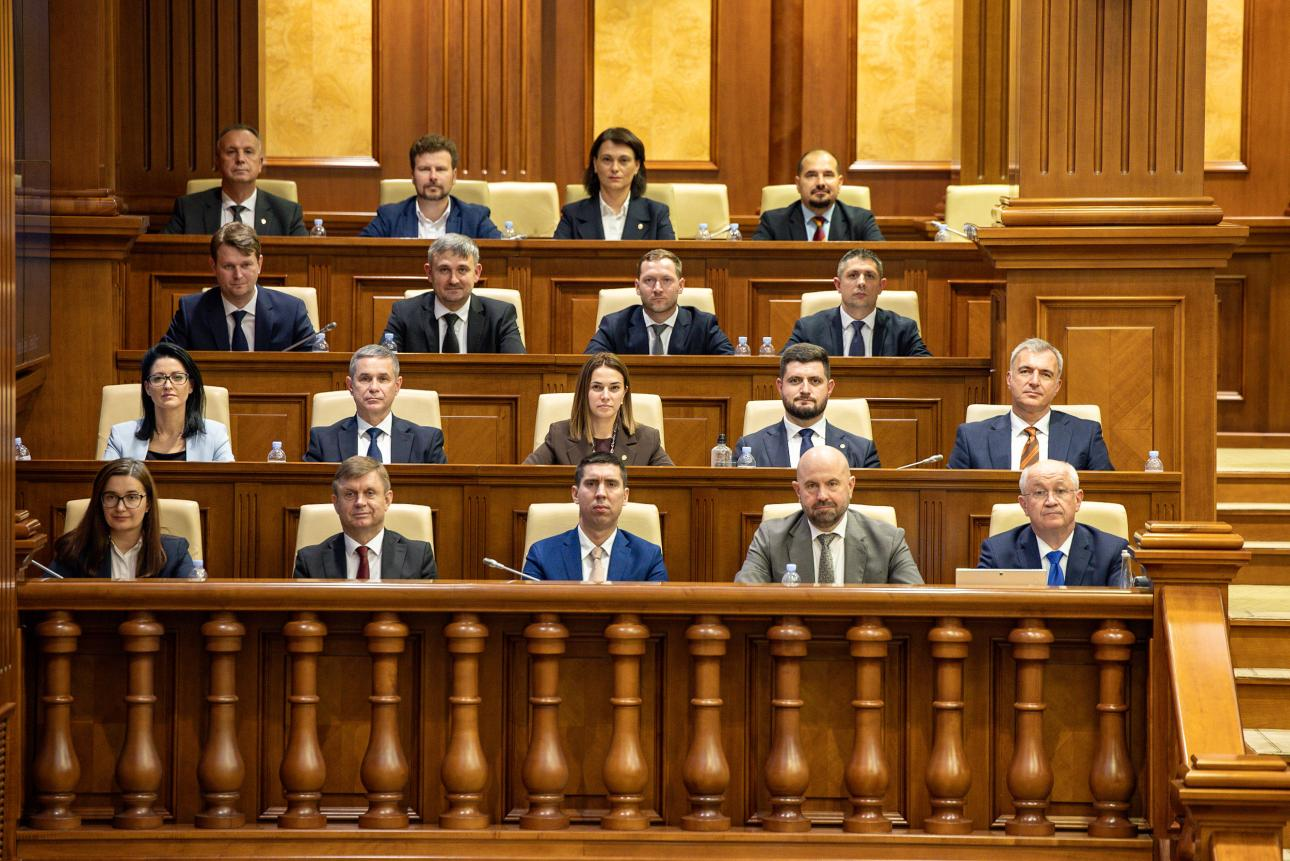
- Munteanu Cabinet in 2025
- Date formed: 1 November 2025
- Date dissolved: 22 July 2026

People and organisations
- President: Maia Sandu
- Head of government: Alexandru Munteanu (until 8 July 2026); Eugen Osmochescu (acting from 8 July 2026)
- Deputy head of government: Mihai Popșoi; Eugen Osmochescu; Vladimir Bolea; Cristina Gherasimov; Valeriu Chiveri
- No. of ministers: 14
- Ministers removed: 1
- Total no. of members: 18
- Member parties: PAS
- Status in legislature: Majority government
- Opposition parties: PSRM; PCRM; BA; PN; PPDA; Independent
- Opposition leaders: Igor Dodon; Diana Caraman; Gaik Vartanean; Renato Usatîi; Vasile Costiuc

History
- Election: 2025 parliamentary election
- Predecessor: Recean Cabinet
- Successor: Tofan Cabinet

The Alexandru Munteanu Cabinet (Romanian: Guvernul Alexandru Munteanu) was the Cabinet of Ministers that governed the Republic of Moldova from 1 November 2025 until 22 July 2026. The cabinet was led by Prime Minister Alexandru Munteanu. The government was invested with the votes of members of Parliament. As the Party of Action and Solidarity (PAS) continues to hold a majority in the Parliament of the Republic of Moldova, the Munteanu Cabinet is an absolute PAS majority government.

On 3 July 2026, Munteanu announced his resignation as the Prime Minister of Moldova, thus triggering the resignation of the whole government with him. President Maia Sandu, later that day, confirmed that Munteanu will remain as an acting Prime Minister until the new one is elected.

On 7 July, president Maia Sandu signed a decree appointing Deputy Prime Minister and Ministry of Economic Development and Digitalization Eugen Osmochescu as the acting Prime Minister starting from the next day, 8 July, under the new head of government is appointed, following the consultations of the president with parliamentary parties.

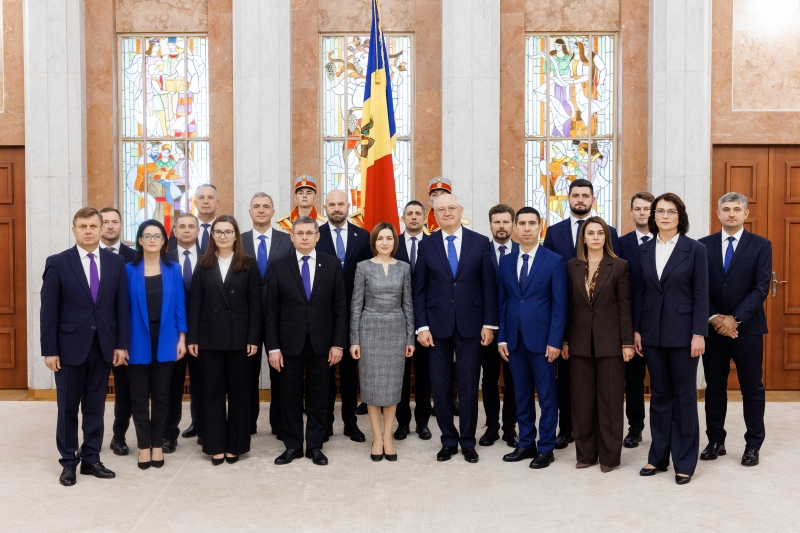
The current president Maia Sandu with members of the Alexandru Munteanu Cabinet.

== Composition ==
Prime Minister and Deputy Prime Ministers in the Munteanu cabinet
Title	Minister		Term of office		Party
Title	Image	Name	Start	End	Party
Prime Minister		Alexandru Munteanu	1 November 2025	8 July 2026	Independent
Prime Minister		Eugen Osmochescu (acting)	8 July 2026	22 July 2026	Independent
Deputy Prime Minister		Mihai Popșoi	29 January 2024	Incumbent	PAS
Deputy Prime Minister		Eugen Osmochescu	1 November 2025	Incumbent	Independent
Deputy Prime Minister		Vladimir Bolea	16 February 2023	Incumbent	PAS
Deputy Prime Minister for European Integration		Cristina Gherasimov	5 February 2024	Incumbent	Independent
Deputy Prime Minister for Reintegration		Valeriu Chiveri	1 November 2025	Incumbent	Independent

Ministers in the Munteanu cabinet
Title	Minister		Term of office		Party
Title	Image	Name	Start	End	Party
Minister of Agriculture and Food Industry		Ludmila Catlabuga	19 November 2024	22 July 2026	PAS
Minister of Culture		Cristian Jardan	1 November 2025	22 July 2026	Independent
Minister of Defense		Anatolie Nosatîi	6 August 2021	Incumbent	Independent
Minister of Economic Development and Digitalization		Eugen Osmochescu	1 November 2025	Incumbent	Independent
Minister of Education and Research		Dan Perciun	17 July 2023	Incumbent	PAS
Minister of Energy		Dorin Junghietu	19 February 2025	Incumbent	Independent
Minister of Environment		Gheorghe Hajder	1 November 2025	Incumbent	PAS
Minister of Finance		Andrian Gavriliță	1 November 2025	22 July 2026	Independent
Minister of Foreign Affairs		Mihai Popșoi	29 January 2024	Incumbent	PAS
Minister of Health		Emil Ceban	1 November 2025	22 July 2026	Independent
Minister of Infrastructure and Regional Development		Vladimir Bolea	19 November 2024	Incumbent	PAS
Minister of Internal Affairs		Daniella Misail-Nichitin	19 November 2024	Incumbent	Independent
Minister of Justice		Vladislav Cojuhari	1 November 2025	Incumbent	Independent
Minister of Labour and Social Protection		Natalia Plugaru	1 November 2025	Incumbent	Independent
Secretary General of the Government		Alexei Buzu	1 November 2025	Incumbent	Independent
