= Viorica Dumbrăveanu =

Moldovan politician (born 1976)

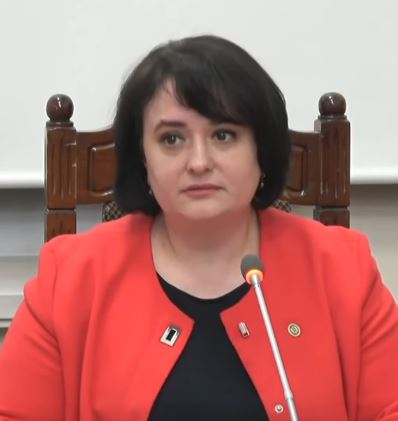
- Dumbrăveanu in 2020

Minister of Health, Labour and Social Protection
- In office 14 November 2019 – 31 December 2020
- President: Igor Dodon; Maia Sandu
- Prime Minister: Ion Chicu
- Preceded by: Ala Nemerenco
- Succeeded by: Ala Nemerenco (as Minister of Health)

Social Issues Advisor to the President
- In office 27 July 2019 – 14 November 2019
- President: Igor Dodon
- Preceded by: Vladimir Șarban
- Succeeded by: Galina Balmoș

Secretary of State of the Ministry of Health, Labour and Social Protection
- In office 8 November 2017 – 26 July 2019
- President: Igor Dodon
- Prime Minister: Pavel Filip; Maia Sandu
- Minister: Stela Grigoraș; Svetlana Cebotari; Silvia Radu; Ala Nemerenco

Deputy Minister of Labour, Social Protection and Family
- In office 3 February 2016 – 7 November 2017
- President: Nicolae Timofti; Igor Dodon
- Prime Minister: Pavel Filip
- Minister: Stela Grigoraș
- In office 19 November 2008 – 9 September 2009
- President: Vladimir Voronin
- Prime Minister: Zinaida Greceanîi
- Minister: Galina Balmoș

Personal details
- Born: 23 December 1976 (age 49) Chișinău, Moldavian SSR, Soviet Union
- Education: Moldova State University

Viorica Dumbrăveanu (born 23 December 1976) is a Moldovan politician. She served as Minister of Health, Labour and Social Protection from 14 November 2019 to 31 December 2020 in the cabinet of Prime Minister Ion Chicu.

Political offices
Preceded by Ala Nemerenco	Minister of Health, Labour and Social Protection; 2019–2020	Office changed to 'Ministry of Labour and Social Protection'
