= Ala Nemerenco =

Moldovan physician and politician (born 1959)

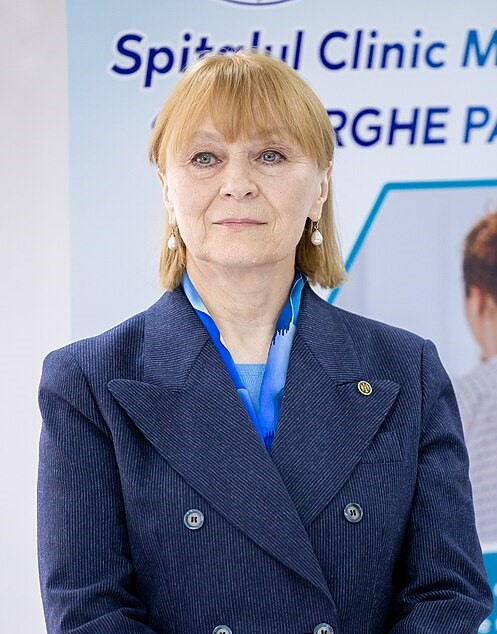
- Nemerenco in 2024

Minister of Health
- In office 6 August 2021 – 1 November 2025
- President: Maia Sandu
- Prime Minister: Natalia Gavrilița; Dorin Recean
- Preceded by: Viorica Dumbrăveanu (as Minister of Health, Labour and Social Protection)
- Succeeded by: Emil Ceban

Healthcare Advisor to the President
- In office 24 December 2020 – 9 August 2021
- President: Maia Sandu
- Succeeded by: Alexandru Gasnaș (2025)

Minister of Health, Labour and Social Protection
- In office 8 June 2019 – 14 November 2019
- President: Igor Dodon
- Prime Minister: Maia Sandu
- Preceded by: Silvia Radu
- Succeeded by: Viorica Dumbrăveanu

Member of the Chișinău Municipal Council
- In office 13 July 2015 – 3 July 2019
- Succeeded by: Victor Chironda

Personal details
- Born: 21 August 1959 (age 66) Soloneț, Moldavian SSR, Soviet Union
- Education: Nicolae Testemițanu State University of Medicine and Pharmacy

Ala Nemerenco (pronunciation: [nemeˈrenko]; born 21 August 1959) is a Moldovan physician and politician. She served as Minister of Health in the cabinets of Prime Ministers Natalia Gavrilița and Dorin Recean.

She served as Minister of Health, Labour and Social Protection from 8 June 2019 to 14 November 2019 in the cabinet of Prime Minister Maia Sandu. Viorica Dumbrăveanu was appointed as her successor.

== Early life ==
She was born on 21 August 1959 in Soloneț, Soroca district, Moldovan SSR. From 1976 to 1982 she attended the Faculty of General Medicine, where she graduated from. After graduating from medical school, she became an intern at the Republican Clinical Hospital. She then worked at municipal polyclinic no. 8 in Chișinău, becoming head of the therapy department there in 1995 and was later a physician at AMT Centru Chișinău in 1998. In 2000 she went to the "Nicolae Testemitanu" University of Medicine and Pharmacy, where she helped found the University Clinic of Primary Medical Assistance which she started leading in 2002. While heading the clinic she started studying for her PhD in social medicine and management in 2003, which she received in 2007 from the place she worked at. Immediately after receiving her PhD she also went on a series of training internships at the National Institute of Public Health of Japan, Harvard University School of Public Health, the School of Public Health in the Netherlands, and Braun School of Public Health.

== Minister of Health ==
During her tenure as Minister of Health, Nemerenco has had to address the COVID-19 pandemic. She strongly supported the introduction of COVID-19 vaccinations.

Political offices
Preceded by Viorica Dumbrăveanu	Minister of Health; 2021–present	Incumbent
Preceded by Silvia Radu	Minister of Health, Labour and Social Protection; 2019	Succeeded by Viorica Dumbrăveanu
