= Larisa Catrinici =

Moldovan physician (born 1961)

Minister of Health
- In office 31 March 2008 – 25 September 2009
- President: Vladimir Voronin; Mihai Ghimpu (acting)
- Prime Minister: Zinaida Greceanîi; Vitalie Pîrlog (acting)
- Preceded by: Ion Ababii
- Succeeded by: Vladimir Hotineanu

Deputy Minister of Health
- In office 6 August 2003 – 11 May 2005
- President: Vladimir Voronin
- Prime Minister: Vasile Tarlev
- Minister: Andrei Gherman; Valerian Revenco

Personal details
- Born: 5 March 1961 (age 65) Ocnița, Moldavian SSR, Soviet Union
- Education: Chișinău State Institute of Medicine

Larisa Catrinici (born 5 March 1961) is a Moldovan physician. She held the office of Minister of Health of Moldova in the Greceanîi Cabinet.
