= Petru Cazacu Cabinet =

Third cabinet of the Moldavian Democratic Republic

The Petru Cazacu Cabinet was the Cabinet of Moldova (9 April 1918 – 29 November 1918).

It was the third and final cabinet of the Moldavian Democratic Republic.

== Membership of the Cabinet ==
- Petru Cazacu, President of the Council and Director General of Finance
- Artur Văitoianu, Military Governor of Bessarabia
- Emanoil Catelli, Director General of Agriculture
- Ion Costin, Director General of Internal Affairs
- Gheorghe Grosu (replaced later by Ion Pelivan), Director General of Justice
- Ştefan Ciobanu, Director General of Public Instruction
- Nicolae Bosie-Codreanu, Director General of Communications
- Vladimir Chiorescu, Director General of Industry and Commerce
- Isac Gherman, Director General of State Control
- Arcadie Osmolovschi, Director General for Minorities

== Notes ==
Preceded by Daniel Ciugureanu Cabinet	Petru Cazacu Cabinet of Moldova; 1918 - 1918	Succeeded by Abolished
