= National Archives of Moldova =

- Arhiva Națională a Republicii Moldova (Romanian)

Agency overview
- Formed: 1990; 36 years ago
- Jurisdiction: Government of Moldova
- Headquarters: Chișinău, Moldova

The National Archives of Moldova (Romanian: Arhiva Națională a Republicii Moldova), is the national archive of Moldova located in Chișinău. The modern day national archive was established in 1990, through the merger of several older archival institutions.

== History ==
The modern day national archive was established on December 3, 1990, through the merger of several archival institutions. These included the Central State Archive of the MSSR, which itself had been formed in 1958 by combining the Central Historical State Archive of the Moldavian Soviet Socialist Republic (MSSR) and the Central State Archive of the October Revolution and Socialist Construction of the MSSR (both founded in 1945). Additionally, the Central State Archive for photo-cinema documents, established in 1977, was also integrated into the ANRM.

In November 2010, an agreement was signed to transfer all files related to Soviet-era repressions from the former KGB archives and the Ministry of Interior to the National Archive of Moldova.

In May 2018, the Estonian IT services company Andmevara AS completed a digitization project for the Moldovan National Archive. Funded by the Estonian Ministry of Foreign Affairs, the two-year development cooperation project digitized 250,000 documents to enhance public access to historical materials.

== Collection ==
The National Archive safeguards and manages records that document Moldova's political, economic, social, and cultural history, spanning from the 15th century to the early 21st century.

The Archive holds a collection of books that were previously part of restricted "special fonds" during the Soviet era. These books, removed from circulation for their perceived ideological incompatibility, include works by pre-World War II Romanian and Moldovan authors and foreign language materials.
