= Nicolae Coval Cabinet =

Moldvan government cabinet

Nicolae Coval Cabinet was the Cabinet of Moldova (19 April 1945 – 5 January 1946).

== Membership of the Cabinet ==
- Nicolae Coval, Prime Minister of Moldova, (19 April 1945 – 5 January 1946)
- Gherasim Rudi, Minister of Foreign Affairs, (19 April 1945 – 5 January 1946)
- Major General Mihail Markeev, Minister of Internal Affairs (19 April 1945 – 5 January 1946)
- General Iosif Mordoveţ, Minister of National Security (19 April 1945 – 5 January 1946)

== Bibliography ==
- *** - Enciclopedia sovietică moldovenească (Chişinău, 1970-1977)

Political offices
Preceded by Tihon Konstantinov Cabinet	Nicolae Coval Cabinet of Moldova; 19 April 1945 - 5 January 1946	Succeeded by Gherasim Rudi Cabinet
