= Leancă Cabinet =

Government of Moldova

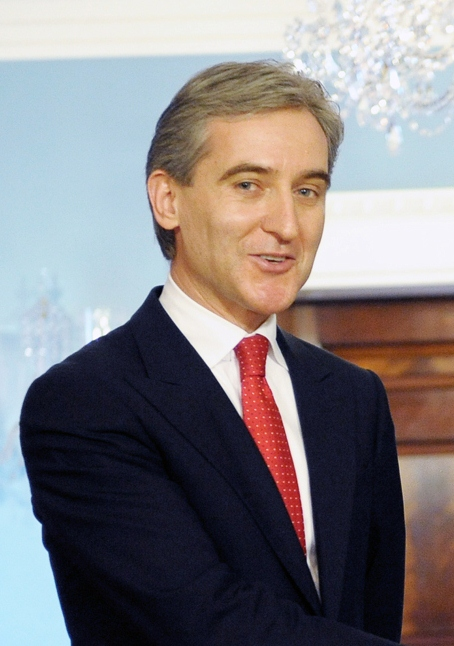
Iurie Leancă (PLDM), in his first term as Prime Minister of Moldova.

The Leancă Cabinet was the Cabinet of Moldova from 30 May 2013 to 18 February 2015. The Cabinet consisted of ministers from the Liberal Democratic Party (PLDM), the Democratic Party (PDM), and the Liberal Reformist Party (PLR), a splinter group from the Liberal Party (PL), who together formed the Pro-European Coalition. The Cabinet was installed after a successful vote of confidence held in the Parliament of Moldova on May 30, 2013.

== Composition ==
The Cabinet consisted of the Prime Minister of Moldova Iurie Leancă (first vice-president of the Liberal Democratic Party of Moldova; PLDM), three Deputy Prime Ministers, each representing one of the parties of the coalition, 15 ministers, and two ex officio members.

=== Ministers ===
Title	Image	Name	Party	Term start	Term end
Prime Minister		Iurie Leancă	PLDM	30 May 2013	18 February 2015
Deputy Prime Minister, Minister of Economy		Valeriu Lazăr	PDM	25 September 2009	3 July 2014
Deputy Prime Minister, Minister of Economy		Andrian Candu	PDM	11 July 2014	23 January 2015
Deputy Prime Minister, Minister of Foreign Affairs and European Integration		Natalia Gherman	PLDM	30 May 2013	20 January 2016
Deputy Prime Minister for Reintegration		Eugen Carpov	PLDM	14 January 2011	18 February 2015
Deputy Prime Minister for Social Affairs		Tatiana Potîng	PLR	30 May 2013	18 February 2015
Minister of Finance		Veaceslav Negruța	PLDM	25 September 2009	14 August 2013
Minister of Finance		Anatol Arapu	PLDM	14 August 2013	20 January 2016
Minister of Justice		Oleg Efrim	PLDM	6 May 2011	18 February 2015
Minister of Internal Affairs		Dorin Recean	PLDM	24 July 2012	18 February 2015
Minister of Defense		Vitalie Marinuța	PLR	25 September 2009	27 February 2014
Minister of Defense		Valeriu Troenco	PLR	5 April 2014	18 February 2015
Minister of Regional Development and Construction		Marcel Răducan	PDM	25 September 2009	18 February 2015
Minister of Agriculture and Food Industry		Vasile Bumacov	PLDM	14 January 2011	18 February 2015
Minister of Transport and Roads Infrastructure		Vasile Botnari	PDM	30 May 2013	30 July 2015
Minister of Environment		Gheorghe Șalaru	PLR	25 September 2009	5 June 2014
Minister of Environment		Valentina Țapiș	PLR	6 June 2014	18 February 2015
Minister of Education		Maia Sandu	PLDM	24 July 2012	30 July 2015
Minister of Culture		Monica Babuc	PDM	30 May 2013	25 July 2017
Minister of Labour, Social Protection and Family		Valentina Buliga	PDM	25 September 2009	18 February 2015
Minister of Health		Andrei Usatîi	PLDM	14 January 2011	18 February 2015
Minister of Youth and Sport		Octavian Bodișteanu	PLR	30 May 2013	18 February 2015
Minister of Information Technology and Communications		Pavel Filip	PDM	14 January 2011	20 January 2016

=== Ex officio members ===
The Başkan (Governor) of Gagauzia is elected by universal, equal, direct, secret and free suffrage on an alternative basis for a term of 4 years. One and the same person can be a governor for no more than two consecutive terms. The Başkan of Gagauzia is confirmed as a member of the Moldovan government by a decree of the President of Moldova.

Title	Image	Name	Party	Term start	Term end
Governor of Gagauzia		Mihail Formuzal	PRM	29 December 2006	23 March 2015
President of the Academy of Sciences of Moldova		Gheorghe Duca	Independent	24 August 2004	28 November 2018

Preceded by Second Filat Cabinet	Cabinet of Moldova; 30 May 2013 – 18 February 2015	Succeeded by Gaburici Cabinet
