= Semion Grossu Cabinet =

Semion Grossu Cabinet was the Cabinet of the Moldovan SSR from 1 August 1976 – 30 December 1980. It was led by Semion Grossu, Chairmen of the Council of Ministers (modern day Prime Minister of Moldova) of the MSSR.

== Membership of the Cabinet ==
- Semion Grossu, Chairman
- Grigore Eremei, Deputy Chairman
- Semion Grossu, Minister of Foreign Affairs
- Lieutenant General Nicolae Bradulov, Minister of Internal Affairs
- Arkady Ragozin (until January 1979)/Gavriil Volkov, Minister of National Security/Chairman of the Moldovan KGB
- Vasile Cherdivarenco, Minister of Education

== Bibliography ==
- *** - Enciclopedia sovietică moldovenească (Chişinău, 1970-1977)

Political offices
Preceded by First Petru Pascari Cabinet	Semion Grossu Cabinet of Moldova; 1 August 1976 – 30 December 1980	Succeeded by Ion Ustian Cabinet
