= Ministry of Labor, Family, and Social Protection =

Ministry of Labor, Family, and Social Protection may refer to:

- Ministry of Labor, Family, and Social Protection (Romania)
- Ministry of Labor, Family, and Social Protection (Moldova)
