= Andrei Usatîi =

Moldovan politician (born 1950)

Minister of Health
- In office 14 January 2011 – 18 February 2015
- President: Marian Lupu (acting); Nicolae Timofti
- Prime Minister: Vladimir Filat; Iurie Leancă
- Preceded by: Vladimir Hotineanu
- Succeeded by: Mircea Buga

Director of the Republican Clinical Hospital
- In office 2010 – 14 January 2011
- Preceded by: Mihai Ouș
- Succeeded by: Serghei Popa (acting)

Deputy Minister of Health
- In office 15 June 1998 – 6 June 2001
- President: Petru Lucinschi; Vladimir Voronin
- Prime Minister: Ion Ciubuc; Ion Sturza; Dumitru Braghiș; Vasile Tarlev
- Minister: Eugen Gladun; Vasile Parasca; Andrei Gherman

Personal details
- Born: 12 December 1950 (age 75) Gangura, Moldavian SSR, Soviet Union
- Children: 2

Andrei Usatîi (born 12 December 1950) is a Moldovan physician and politician who served as the Minister of Health in Second Filat Cabinet since January 2011 to 18 February 2015.

Before being appointed minister, he served as the director of the Republican Clinical Hospital in Chișinău.

On 2 April 2015 he was awarded the Order of Honour.
