= First Filat Cabinet =

Government of Moldova

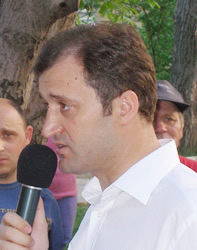
Vlad Filat (PLDM), Prime Minister

The First Filat Cabinet was the Cabinet of Moldova between September 25, 2009, and January 14, 2011. It was a caretaker cabinet from the election of November 28, 2010, until it was succeeded by the Second Filat Cabinet on January 14, 2011.

== History ==
The cabinet was formed by the Alliance for European Integration, consisting of the Liberal Democratic Party, the Democratic Party and the Liberal Party who held 53 out of 101 seats in Parliament of Moldova. The government won a vote of confidence on September 25, 2009.

Political forces	Seats	Moldovan Parliament seats after July 2009 polls
Alliance for European Integration (right-wing)	53	
Party of Communists (left-wing)	48	
PCRM (48); PLDM (18); PL (15); PDM (13); AMN (7)

== Composition ==
The Cabinet consisted of the Prime Minister of Moldova Vlad Filat (leader of the Liberal Democratic Party of Moldova; PLDM), four Deputy Prime Ministers, each representing one of the parties of the coalition, 15 ministers, and two ex officio members.

The Government had 16 Ministries: two Deputy Prime Ministers are also Ministers, while the Minister of State does not lead a Ministry. Two ministries from the previous Cabinet of Zinaida Greceanîi (Reintegration and Local Public Administration) were dissolved.

=== Ministers ===
Title	Image	Name	Party	Term start	Term end
Prime Minister		Vlad Filat	PLDM	25 September 2009	25 April 2013
Deputy Prime Minister, Minister of Economy		Valeriu Lazăr	PDM	25 September 2009	3 July 2014
Deputy Prime Minister, Minister of Foreign Affairs and European Integration		Iurie Leancă	PLDM	25 September 2009	30 May 2013
Deputy Prime Minister for Reintegration		Victor Osipov	AMN	25 September 2009	14 January 2011
Deputy Prime Minister for Social Affairs		Ion Negrei	PL	25 September 2009	14 January 2011
Minister of State		Victor Bodiu	PLDM	25 September 2009	14 January 2011
Minister of Finance		Veaceslav Negruța	PLDM	25 September 2009	14 August 2013
Minister of Justice		Alexandru Tănase	PLDM	25 September 2009	6 May 2011
Minister of Internal Affairs		Victor Catan	PLDM	25 September 2009	14 January 2011
Minister of Defense		Vitalie Marinuța	PL	25 September 2009	27 February 2014
Minister of Regional Development and Construction		Marcel Răducan	PDM	25 September 2009	18 February 2015
Minister of Agriculture and Food Industry		Valeriu Cosarciuc	AMN	25 September 2009	14 January 2011
Minister of Transport and Roads Infrastructure		Anatol Șalaru	PL	25 September 2009	30 May 2013
Minister of Environment		Gheorghe Șalaru	PL	25 September 2009	5 June 2014
Minister of Education		Leonid Bujor	AMN	25 September 2009	14 January 2011
Minister of Culture		Boris Focșa	PDM	25 September 2009	30 May 2013
Minister of Labour, Social Protection and Family		Valentina Buliga	PDM	25 September 2009	18 February 2015
Minister of Health		Vladimir Hotineanu	PLDM	25 September 2009	14 January 2011
Minister of Youth and Sport		Ion Cebanu	PL	25 September 2009	6 February 2013
Minister of Information Technology and Communications		Alexandru Oleinic	AMN	25 September 2009	14 January 2011

=== Ex officio members ===
The Başkan (Governor) of Gagauzia is elected by universal, equal, direct, secret and free suffrage on an alternative basis for a term of 4 years. One and the same person can be a governor for no more than two consecutive terms. The Başkan of Gagauzia is confirmed as a member of the Moldovan government by a decree of the President of Moldova.

Title	Image	Name	Party	Term start	Term end
Governor of Gagauzia		Mihail Formuzal	PRM	29 December 2006	23 March 2015
President of the Academy of Sciences of Moldova		Gheorghe Duca	Independent	24 August 2004	28 November 2018

== Activity ==
The first cabinet meeting was held on September 25, 2009, at 22:00.

== See also ==
- Cabinet of Moldova

Preceded by Zinaida Greceanîi Cabinet (Second)	Cabinet of Moldova; 25 September 2009 - 14 January 2011	Succeeded by Second Filat Cabinet
