= Mircea Buga =

Moldovan physician and politician

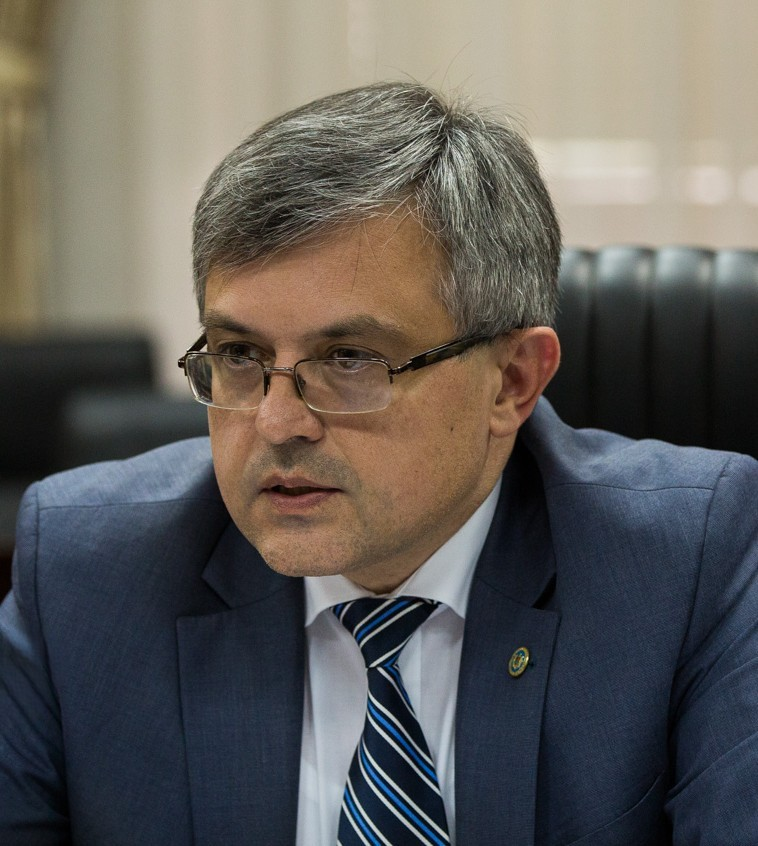
- Buga in 2018

Minister of Labour, Social Protection and Family
- In office 30 July 2015 – 20 January 2016
- President: Nicolae Timofti
- Prime Minister: Valeriu Streleț; Gheorghe Brega (acting)
- Preceded by: Ruxanda Glavan
- Succeeded by: Stela Grigoraș

Minister of Health
- In office 18 February 2015 – 30 July 2015
- President: Nicolae Timofti
- Prime Minister: Chiril Gaburici; Natalia Gherman (acting)
- Preceded by: Andrei Usatîi
- Succeeded by: Ruxanda Glavan

Deputy Minister of Health
- In office 20 July 2007 – 26 August 2009
- President: Vladimir Voronin
- Prime Minister: Vasile Tarlev; Zinaida Greceanîi
- Minister: Ion Ababii; Larisa Catrinici

Personal details
- Born: 11 September 1968 (age 57) Chișinău, Moldavian SSR, Soviet Union
- Party: European Social Democratic Party
- Education: Iuliu Hațieganu University of Medicine and Pharmacy; Moldova State University
- Profession: Physician

Mircea Buga (Romanian pronunciation: [ˈmirtʃe̯a ˈbuɡa]; born 11 September 1968) is a Moldovan physician and politician.

== Biography ==
He has a medical background and is a politician who was the Minister of Labour, Social Protection and Family of the Republic of Moldova from 30 July 2015 to 20 January 2016. Before, in the period 18 February 2015 to 30 July 2015 he was the Minister of Health of the Republic of Moldova, succeeding Andrei Usatîi (2011-2015). In the Strelets Government, he switched his place with Ruxanda Glavan, taking over the Ministry of Labour, Social Protection and Family and ceding the Ministry of Health. Mircea Buga has also been the General Director of the National Health Insurance Company (since 2009), and by that time, he was Deputy Minister of Health (2007-2009).

== Personal life ==
Mircea Buga is married and has two children.
