= Stela Grigoraș =

Moldovan politician (born 1968)

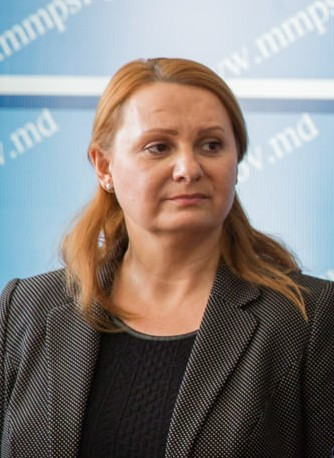
- Grigoraș in 2016

Minister of Health, Labour and Social Protection
- In office 26 July 2017 – 21 December 2017
- President: Igor Dodon
- Prime Minister: Pavel Filip
- Preceded by: Ruxanda Glavan (as Minister of Health)
- Succeeded by: Svetlana Cebotari

Minister of Labour, Social Protection and Family
- In office 20 January 2016 – 26 July 2017
- President: Nicolae Timofti; Igor Dodon
- Prime Minister: Pavel Filip
- Preceded by: Mircea Buga
- Succeeded by: Marcel Spatari (2021) (as Minister of Labour and Social Protection)

Personal details
- Born: 15 August 1968 (age 58) Chişinău, Moldavian SSR, Soviet Union
- Education: Nicolae Testemițanu State University of Medicine and Pharmacy; Tel Aviv University Faculty of Medicine; Academy of Sciences of Moldova

Stela Grigoraș (born 15 August 1968) is a Moldovan politician. She served as Minister of Labour, Social Protection and Family from January 2016 and July 2017 and Minister of Health, Labour and Social Protection from July to December 2017, both in the cabinet of Prime Minister Pavel Filip.

== Early life and education ==
Grigoraș was born in Chişinău on 15 August 1968. She graduated from the Nicolae Testemițanu State University of Medicine and Pharmacy, with a degree in paediatrics. In 1998, she was awarded a diploma in postgraduate medicine in Tel Aviv University of medicine. In 2002, she took a course in social work at the University of Östersund in Sweden. Later, she studied social policies, obtaining the title of Doctor of Sociology, at the Institute of Philosophy, Sociology and Law, at the Academy of Sciences of Moldova.

== Professional and political career ==
Prior to entering the political arena, Grigoraș worked in the medical field, having the qualification of paediatrician and in the social field, being the president of the public association "Partnerships for every child". Within this organization, it has implemented numerous projects focused on reforming the social protection system by reorganizing the residential childcare system, developing social services and promoting the right of every child to grow up in the family. In November 2015, she was elected President of the International Foster Care Organization.

Grigoraș was appointed Minister of Labour, Social Protection and Family in January 2016. In July 2017, she was appointed Minister of Health, Labour and Social Protection.

== Awards and recognition ==
Grigoraș is a doctor in sociology and the holder of the "Civic Merit" medal for the active promotion of children's rights. She is the only woman in Moldova who has been invited to speak at the House of Lords in the United Kingdom to raise awareness among British lawmakers about the need to support disadvantaged children in Moldova and their families.

== Personal life ==
Grigoraș is married and has 3 children.
