= Tofan Cabinet =

23rd Cabinet of Moldova

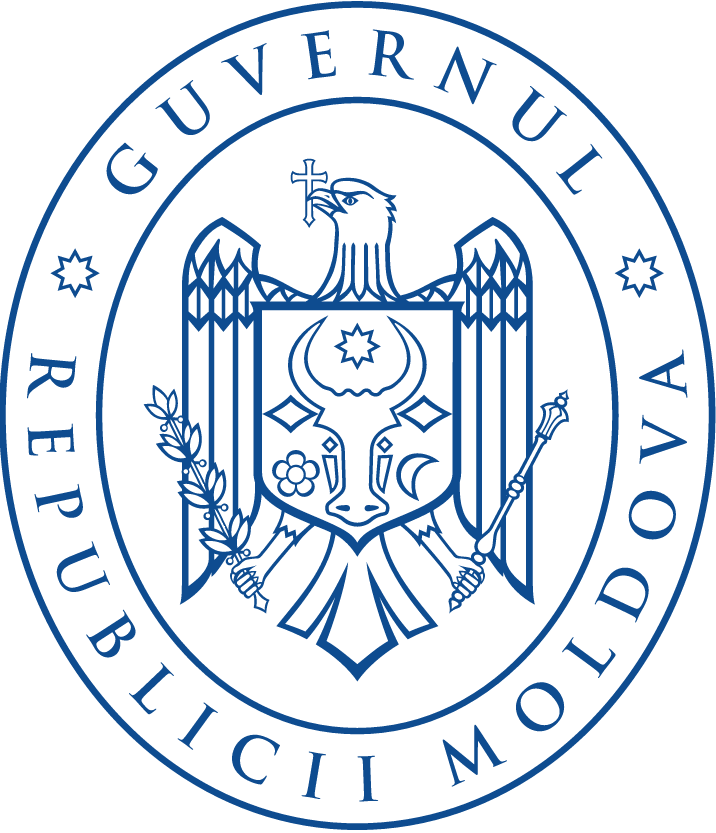
- 23rd Cabinet of Moldova

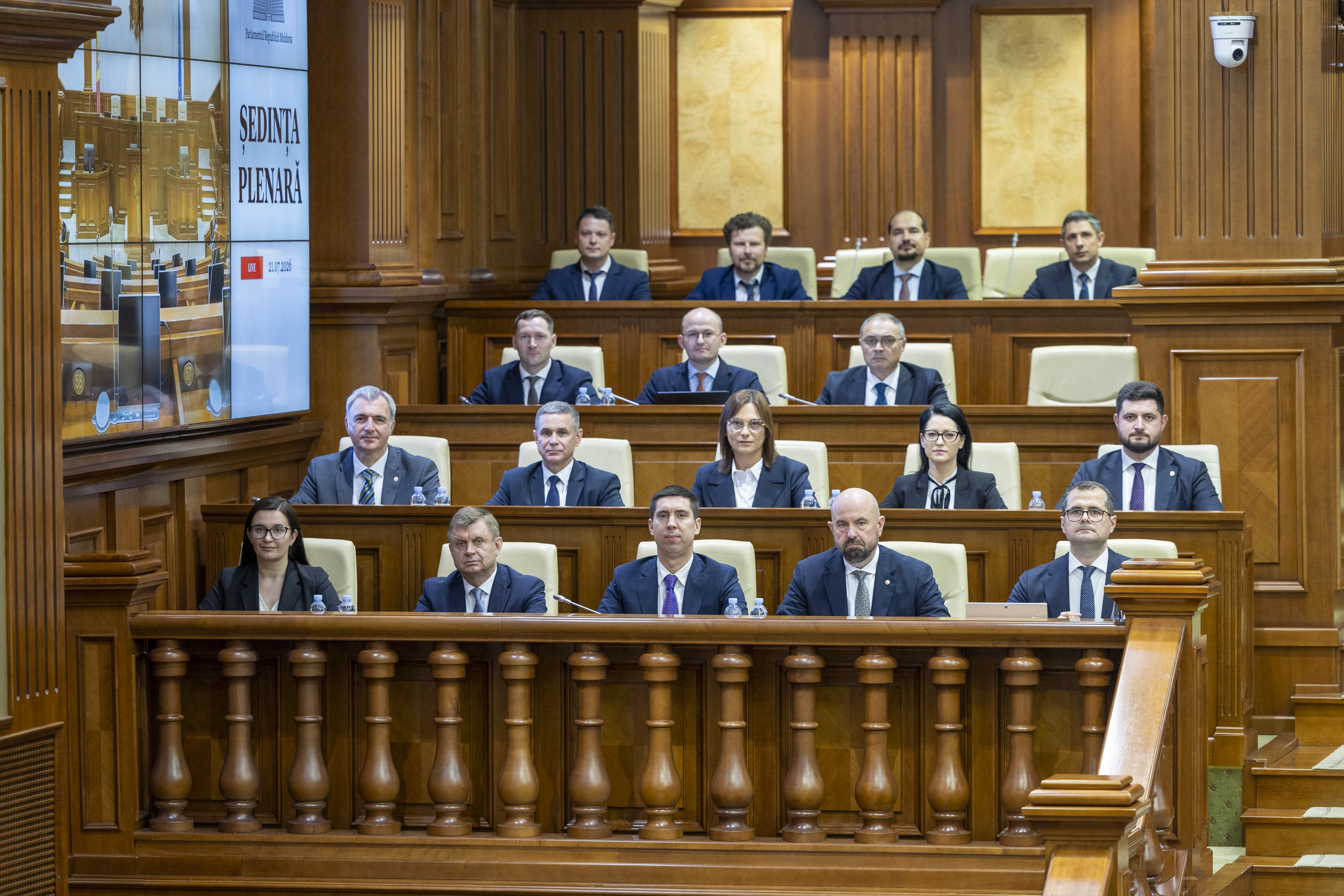
- Tofan Cabinet in 2026
- Date formed: 22 July 2026 (85 days)

People and organisations
- President: Maia Sandu
- Head of government: Vasile Tofan
- Deputy head of government: Mihai Popșoi; Vladimir Bolea; Cristina Gherasimov; Valeriu Chiveri
- No. of ministers: 14
- Ministers removed: 2
- Total no. of members: 18
- Member parties: PAS
- Status in legislature: Majority government
- Opposition parties: PSRM; PCRM; BA; PN; PPDA; Independent
- Opposition leaders: Igor Dodon; Diana Caraman; Gaik Vartanean; Renato Usatîi; Vasile Costiuc

History
- Election: 2025 parliamentary election
- Predecessor: Munteanu Cabinet

The Vasile Tofan Cabinet (Romanian: Guvernul Vasile Tofan) is the incumbent Cabinet of Ministers that has governed the Republic of Moldova since 22 July 2026. The cabinet is led by Prime Minister Vasile Tofan. The government was invested with the votes of members of Parliament. As the Party of Action and Solidarity (PAS) continues to hold a majority in the Parliament of the Republic of Moldova, the Tofan Cabinet is an absolute PAS majority government.

== Composition ==
Prime Minister and Deputy Prime Ministers in the Tofan cabinet
Title	Minister		Term of office		Party
Title	Image	Name	Start	End	Party
Prime Minister		Vasile Tofan	22 July 2026	Incumbent	Independent
Deputy Prime Minister		Mihai Popșoi	29 January 2024	Incumbent	PAS
Deputy Prime Minister		Vladimir Bolea	16 February 2023	Incumbent	PAS
Deputy Prime Minister		Eugen Osmochescu	1 November 2025	28 August 2026	Independent
Deputy Prime Minister for European Integration		Cristina Gherasimov	5 February 2024	Incumbent	Independent
Deputy Prime Minister for Reintegration		Valeriu Chiveri	1 November 2025	Incumbent	Independent

Ministers in the Tofan cabinet
Title	Minister		Term of office		Party
Title	Image	Name	Start	End	Party
Minister of Agriculture and Food Industry		Radu Musteața	22 July 2026	24 July 2026	Independent
Minister of Agriculture and Food Industry		Eugen Osmochescu	28 August 2026	Incumbent	Independent
Minister of Culture		Dan Suruceanu	22 July 2026	Incumbent	Independent
Minister of Defense		Anatolie Nosatîi	6 August 2021	Incumbent	Independent
Minister of Economic Development and Digitalization		Eugen Osmochescu	1 November 2025	28 August 2026	Independent
Minister of Economic Development and Digitalization		Claudiu Năsui	28 August 2026	Incumbent	Independent
Minister of Education and Research		Dan Perciun	17 July 2023	Incumbent	PAS
Minister of Energy		Dorin Junghietu	19 February 2025	Incumbent	Independent
Minister of Environment		Gheorghe Hajder	1 November 2025	Incumbent	PAS
Minister of Finance		Victoria Belous	22 July 2026	Incumbent	PAS
Minister of Foreign Affairs		Mihai Popșoi	29 January 2024	Incumbent	PAS
Minister of Health		Alexandru Gasnaș	22 July 2026	Incumbent	Independent
Minister of Infrastructure and Regional Development		Vladimir Bolea	19 November 2024	Incumbent	PAS
Minister of Internal Affairs		Daniella Misail-Nichitin	19 November 2024	Incumbent	Independent
Minister of Justice		Vladislav Cojuhari	1 November 2025	Incumbent	Independent
Minister of Labour and Social Protection		Natalia Plugaru	1 November 2025	Incumbent	Independent
Secretary General of the Government		Alexei Buzu	1 November 2025	Incumbent	Independent
Governor of Gagauzia		Ilia Uzun (acting)	5 August 2025	Incumbent	Independent
