= Alexandru Gasnaș =

Moldovan neurologist and associate professor (born 1984)

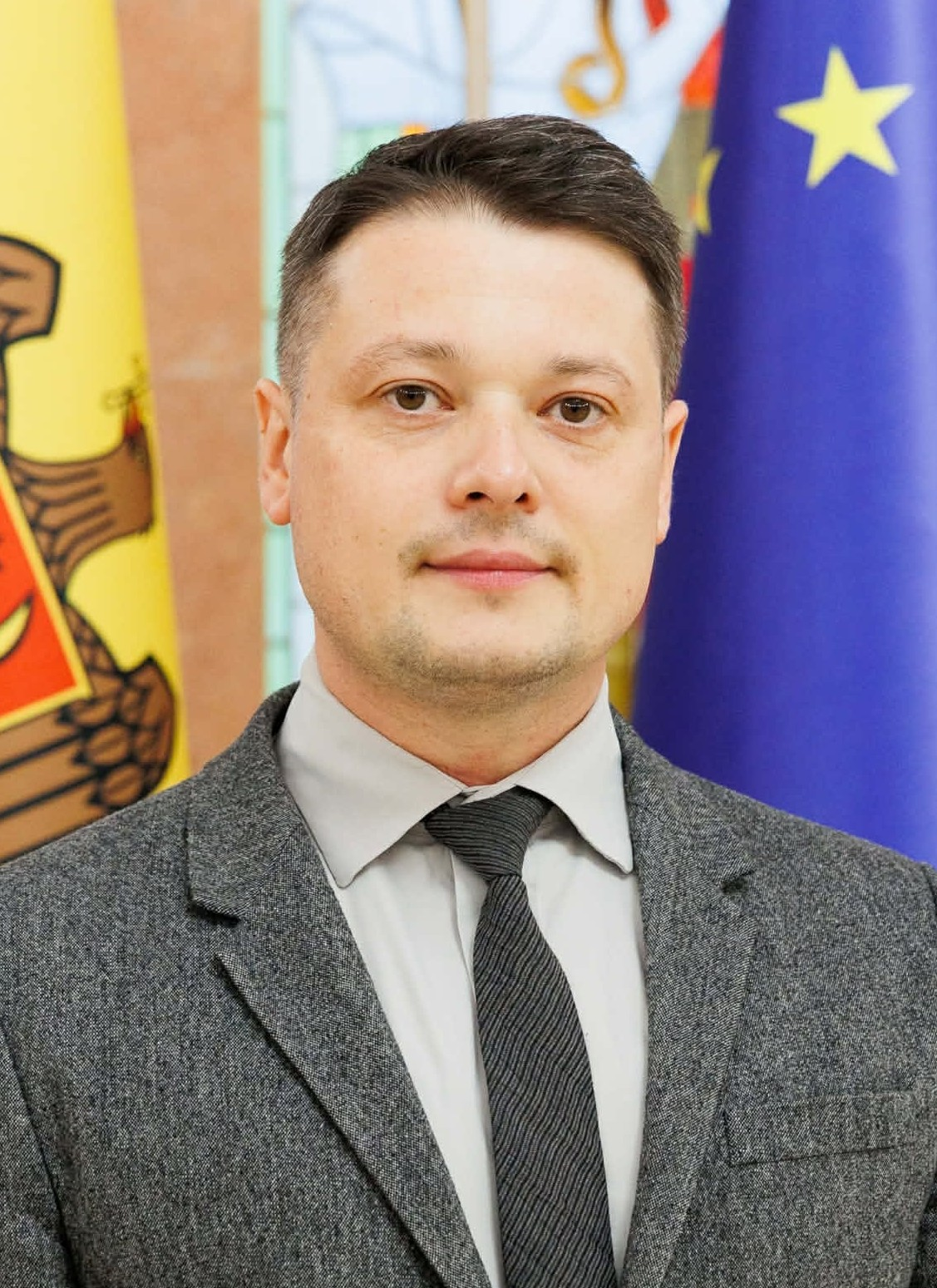
- Official portrait, 2025

Minister of Health
- Incumbent
- Assumed office 22 July 2026
- President: Maia Sandu
- Prime Minister: Vasile Tofan
- Preceded by: Emil Ceban

Healthcare Advisor to the President
- In office 10 November 2025 – 23 July 2026
- President: Maia Sandu
- Preceded by: Ala Nemerenco (2021)

Secretary of State of the Ministry of Health
- In office 25 January 2023 – 20 November 2024
- President: Maia Sandu
- Prime Minister: Dorin Recean
- Minister: Ala Nemerenco

Personal details
- Born: 9 March 1984 (age 42) Chișinău, Moldavian SSR, Soviet Union
- Education: Nicolae Testemițanu State University of Medicine and Pharmacy; Academy of Economic Studies of Moldova

Alexandru Gasnaș (born 9 March 1984) is a Moldovan neurologist and associate professor, currently serving as Minister of Health of Moldova in the Tofan Cabinet.
