= Boris Focșa =

Moldovan politician (born 1968)

Boris Focşa

Minister of Culture
- In office 25 September 2009 – 30 May 2013
- President: Mihai Ghimpu (acting); Vladimir Filat (acting); Marian Lupu (acting); Nicolae Timofti
- Prime Minister: Vladimir Filat
- Preceded by: Mihail Barbulat (as Minister of Culture and Tourism)
- Succeeded by: Monica Babuc

Personal details
- Born: 10 May 1968 (age 57) Sărătenii Vechi, Moldavian SSR, Soviet Union
- Party: Democratic Party of Moldova; Alliance for European Integration (2009–present)
- Profession: Actor

Boris Focşa (born 10 May 1968) is a Moldovan politician. He was the Minister of Culture in the First Vlad Filat Cabinet and in the Second Filat Cabinet.

He is a member of the Democratic Party of Moldova.
