= Vladimir Gurițenco =

Moldovan politician (born 1954)

Minister of Labour, Social Protection and Family
- In office 22 May 1998 – 21 December 1999
- President: Petru Lucinschi
- Prime Minister: Ion Ciubuc; Ion Sturza
- Preceded by: Vasile Vartic
- Succeeded by: Valerian Revenco

Personal details
- Born: 22 February 1954 (age 72) Molovata, Moldavian SSR, Soviet Union

Vladimir Gurițenco (born 22 February 1954) is a Moldovan politician. He served as Minister of Labour and Social Protection of Moldova from 1998 to 1999.
