= Vasile Parasca =

Moldovan politician (born 1948)

Member of the Chișinău Municipal Council
- In office 29 November 2012 – 14 June 2015
- Preceded by: Victor Bodiu

Minister of Health
- In office 21 December 1999 – 19 April 2001
- President: Petru Lucinschi; Vladimir Voronin
- Prime Minister: Dumitru Braghiș
- Preceded by: Eugen Gladun
- Succeeded by: Andrei Gherman

Personal details
- Born: 20 July 1948 (age 78) Clocușna, Moldavian SSR, Soviet Union
- Education: Chișinău State Institute of Medicine

Vasile Parasca (born 20 July 1948) is a Moldovan physician and politician. He served as the Minister of Health of Moldova from 1999 to 2001.
