= Natalia Plugaru =

Moldovan economist

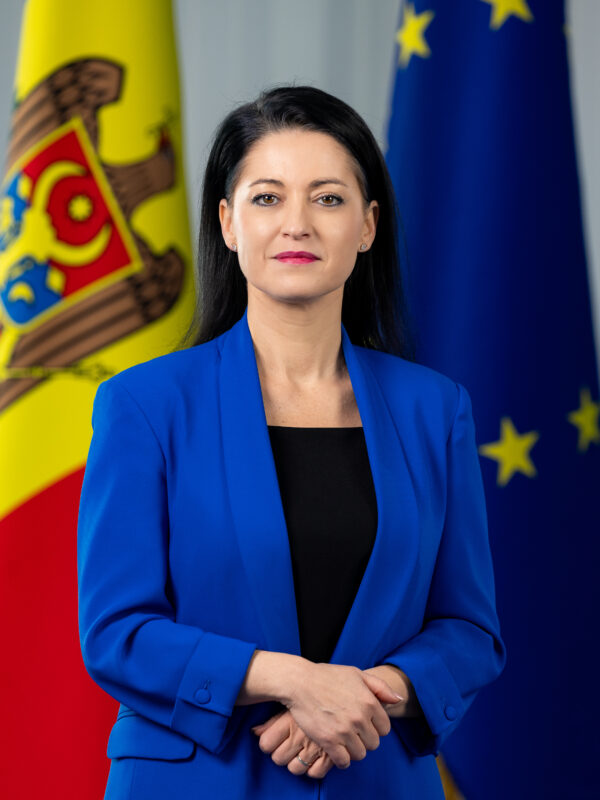
- Official portrait, 2025

Minister of Labour and Social Protection
- Incumbent
- Assumed office 1 November 2025
- President: Maia Sandu
- Prime Minister: Alexandru Munteanu; Eugen Osmochescu (acting); Vasile Tofan
- Preceded by: Alexei Buzu

Personal details
- Born: 4 September 1982 (age 43)
- Education: Alecu Russo State University of Bălți; Bucharest Academy of Economic Studies

Natalia Plugaru (born 4 September 1982) is a Moldovan economist, expert in social policy. She currently serves as Minister of Labour and Social Protection in the Tofan Cabinet.
