= Emil Ceban =

Moldovan politician (born 1966)

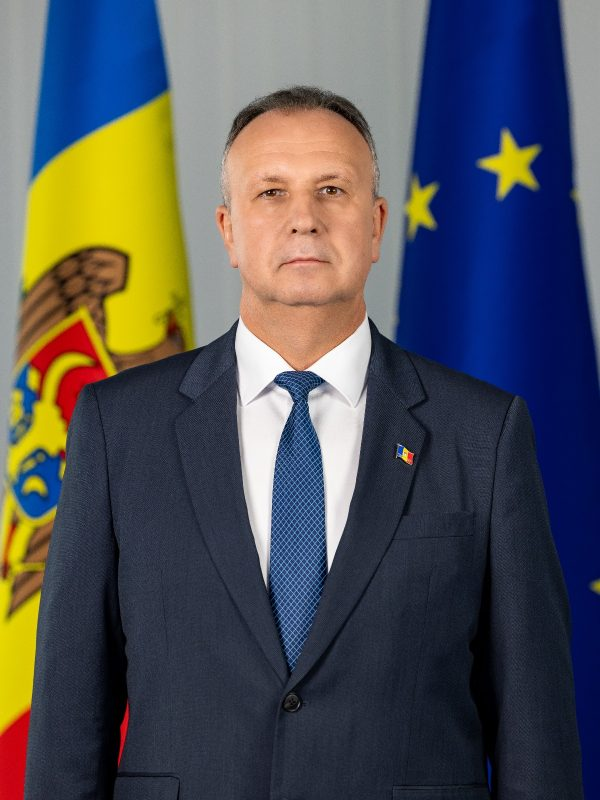
- Official portrait, 2025

Rector of the Nicolae Testemițanu State University of Medicine and Pharmacy
- Incumbent
- Assumed office 22 July 2026
- In office 3 October 2019 – 1 November 2025
- Preceded by: Ion Ababii

Minister of Health
- In office 1 November 2025 – 22 July 2026
- President: Maia Sandu
- Prime Minister: Alexandru Munteanu; Eugen Osmochescu (acting)
- Preceded by: Ala Nemerenco
- Succeeded by: Alexandru Gasnaș

Member of the Moldovan Parliament
- In office 22 October 2025 – 1 November 2025
- Succeeded by: Alexandr Trubca
- Parliamentary group: Party of Action and Solidarity

Personal details
- Born: 6 September 1966 (age 59) Lipnic, Moldavian SSR, Soviet Union
- Education: Nicolae Testemițanu State University of Medicine and Pharmacy

Emil Ceban (born 6 September 1966) is a Moldovan physician, professor and academic who served as Minister of Health of Moldova in the Munteanu Cabinet.
