= Ion Ababii =

Moldovan physician

Ion Ababii OR
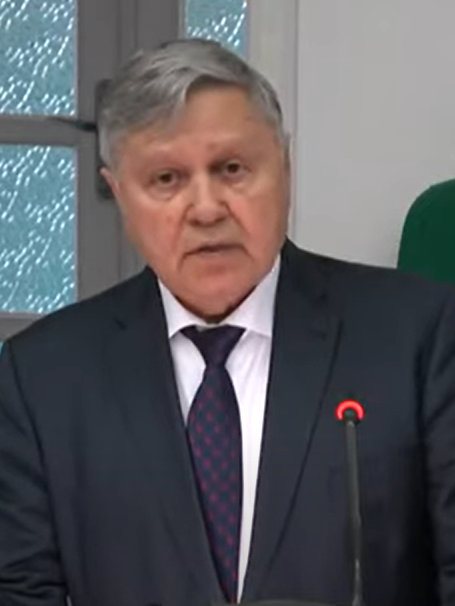
- Ababii in 2019

Rector of the Nicolae Testemițanu State University of Medicine and Pharmacy
- In office 21 November 2008 – 2 October 2019
- Succeeded by: Emil Ceban
- In office 8 December 1994 – 5 November 2005
- Preceded by: Leonid Cobâleanschi

Minister of Health
- In office 5 November 2005 – 31 March 2008
- President: Vladimir Voronin
- Prime Minister: Vasile Tarlev
- Preceded by: Valerian Revenco (as Minister of Health and Social Protection)
- Succeeded by: Larisa Catrinici

Personal details
- Born: 11 February 1944 (age 82) Ochiul Alb, Moldavian SSR, Soviet Union
- Education: Chișinău State Institute of Medicine

Ion Ababii (born 11 February 1944) is a Moldovan phyisican, specialist in otorhinolaryngology. He was elected as correspondent member (1993) and later on became a full member (2000) of the Moldovan Academy of Sciences. He was Rector of the Nicolae Testemițanu State University of Medicine and Pharmacy in Chișinău. He held the position of Minister of Health of Moldova.

== Biography ==
Ion Ababii was born 11 of February 1944, in Ochiul Alb. He graduated the University of General Medicine in the State Institute of Medicine in Chișinău. After graduating university, he worked as therapist between 1966 and 1969 and finally as an otorhinolaryngology medic in the local hospital of Strășeni. Soon after, he applied for his doctorate in medicine, specialising in otorhinolaryngology, at the Institute of Scientific Research in Moscow, where he obtained the title of academic doctor in 1972. He will go on to study postdoctoral courses at the same institute between 1983 and 1985. He also worked as a lecturer in the department of otorhinolaryngology, vice-rector in clinical medicine and head of the department of otorhinolaryngology in the State Institute of Medicine in Chișinău and he became a university professor in 1989.

Moreover, he was elected honorary member of the Academy of Sciences in Poland and Finland, honorary member of the Academy of Otorhinolaryngology in the US, the Academy of Otorhinolaryngology of the navy in the Russian Federation and the Rhinologist Society in the Russian Federation. Furthermore, He is the author of 367 published scientific papers, including 5 monographs, 4 manuals, 30 methodical guidences and 17 patents. Starting with the year 1994 he was rector of the State University of Medicine and Pharmacy "Nicolae Testemițanu" in Chișinău. As recognition for his scientific activity in the field, Ion Ababii was first elected correspondent member (1993) and then full member (2000) in the Academy of Sciences in the Republic of Moldavia.

Ion Ababii occupied a series of administrative roles: president of the Otorhinolaryngologists Society in the Republic of Moldavia; primary specialist of the Ministry of Health and Social Protection of the Republic of Moldavia; member of the Higher Commission of Accreditation of the Republic of Moldavia, member of the Scientific Council specialised on defending doctoral theses, president of Senate, Scientific Council, Bureau of Senate and the Administration Council of the State University of Medicine and Pharmacy "Nicolae Testemițanu" in Chișinău. From 8 November 2005, he was named Minister of Health and Social Protection by decree of the president of the Republic of Moldavia. He was later relieved of duty on 31 March with the forming of a new government led by Zinaida Greceanîi.

As a recognition for his merits in the field of research of otorhinolaryngology, Ion Ababii was given the following distinctions:

- Title of "Om Emerit"
- „Дружба народов” order. (1981)
- The Albert Schweitzer Gold Medal. (1997)
- The Albert Schweitzer Higher Gold Medal. (2001)
- The Paul Erlich Gold Medal. (2002)
- The "Robert Koch" Medal. (2004)
- The Order of the Republic. (2004)
- The "Nicolai Pirogov" Medal. (2005)
- The "Bogdan Întemeietorul" Order. (2019)
