= Constantin Mihăilescu =

Moldovan biologist and ecologist

Minister of Ecology and Natural Resources
- In office 19 March 2004 – 27 February 2008
- President: Vladimir Voronin
- Prime Minister: Vasile Tarlev
- Preceded by: Gheorghe Duca
- Succeeded by: Violeta Ivanov

Personal details
- Born: 4 April 1959 (age 67) Cîrpești, Moldavian SSR, Soviet Union

Constantin Mihăilescu (born 4 April 1959) is a Moldovan biologist and ecologist who served as the Minister of Ecology and Natural Resources of Moldova from 2004 to 2008.
