= Eugen Gladun =

Moldovan politician (1936–2014)

Eugen Gladun OR

Minister of Health
- In office 22 May 1998 – 21 December 1999
- President: Petru Lucinschi
- Prime Minister: Ion Ciubuc; Ion Sturza
- Preceded by: Mihai Magdei
- Succeeded by: Vasile Parasca

Member of the Moldovan Parliament
- In office 20 March 1998 – 28 May 1998
- Succeeded by: Grigore Sîrbu
- Parliamentary group: For a Democratic and Prosperous Moldova Electoral Bloc

Personal details
- Born: 27 April 1936 Nesfoaia, Kingdom of Romania
- Died: 31 May 2014 (aged 78) Chișinău, Moldova
- Education: Chișinău State Institute of Medicine

Eugen Gladun (27 April 1936 – 31 May 2014) was a Moldovan physician. He served as the Minister of Health of Moldova from 1998 to 1999.
