= Ministry of Foreign Affairs (Moldova) =

Government ministry of Moldova

- Ministerul Afacerilor Externe
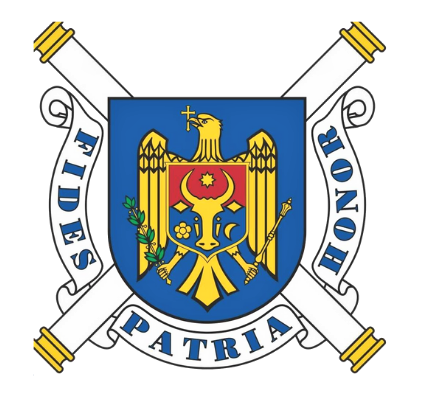
- Seal of the Ministry

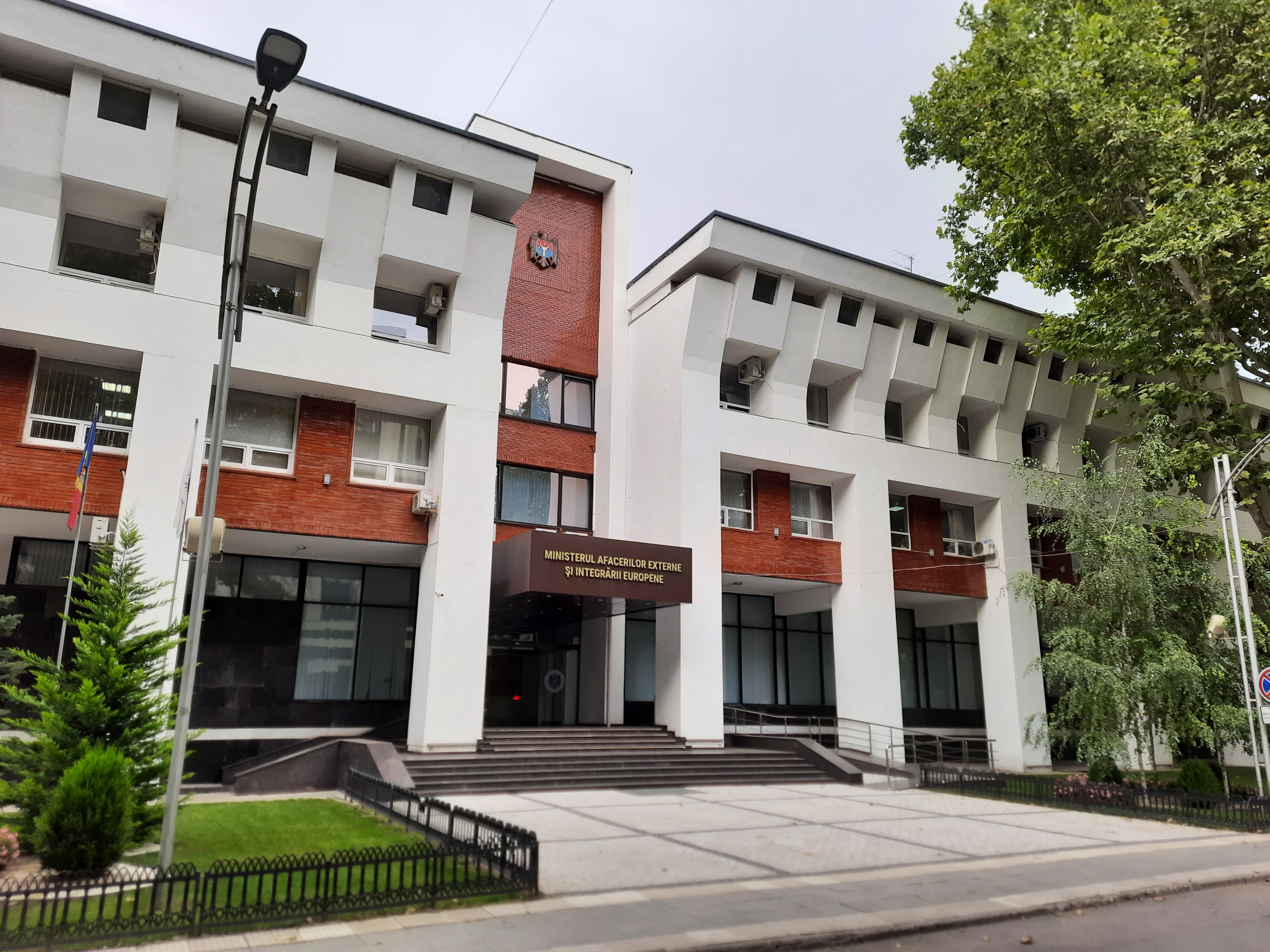
- Headquarters in Chișinău

Ministry overview
- Formed: 6 June 1990; 36 years ago
- Preceding Ministry: Ministry of Foreign Affairs and European Integration (2009–2024)
- Jurisdiction: Government of Moldova
- Headquarters: 80 31 August 1989 Street, Chișinău
- Minister responsible: Mihai Popșoi, Deputy Prime Minister, Minister of Foreign Affairs
- Ministry executives: Dumitru Socolan, Secretary General; Corina Călugăru, Secretary of State; Valeriu Mija, Secretary of State; Carolina Perebinos, Secretary of State
- Website: mfa.gov.md

The Ministry of Foreign Affairs (Romanian: Ministerul Afacerilor Externe) is one of the fourteen ministries of the Government of Moldova.

== Pre-history ==
The ministry was established on 1 February 1944, as the People's Commissariat of Foreign Affairs of the Moldavian SSR. It would later be renamed to the Ministry of Foreign Affairs of the MSSR on 27 March 1946.

He following have served as the foreign ministers of the Moldavian SSR:

- Gherasim Rudi (12 July 1944 – 19 July 1946)
- Alexandru Diordiță (23 January 1958 – 15 April 1970)
- Petru Pascari (24 April 1970 – 1 August 1976)
- Semion Grossu (1 September 1976 – 31 December 1980)
- Ion Ustian (31 December 1980 – 29 December 1981)
- Petru Comendant (29 December 1981 – 24 May 1990)

The Council of People's Commissars in subsequent decades, exercised leadership in the MSSR's foreign relations with foreign nations. At the same time, the post of Minister of Foreign Affairs was often concurrent with the post of Chairman of the Council of Ministers (Prime Minister) of the Republic. During its existence, Moldova had representatives only in the Hungarian People's Republic, with the entire apparatus only consisting then of several people. The highest recognition the ministry received was on 23 November 1983, when Foreign Minister Comendant spoke at a meeting of the UN General Assembly. According to the 1978 Soviet Moldovan Constitution, the international rights of the MSSR were reduced in comparison with the amendments of 1944.

== Modern ministry ==
The ministry was converted into its current form on 31 August 1989. According to Constitution of Moldova (1994), the structure of the Government is determined by organic law. The office of Foreign Minister is one of the most high-profile positions in the Government of Moldova.

== Structure ==
The following subdivisions are part of the MFA:

- State Diplomatic Protocol (SDP)
- Press Service
- European Integration Directorate
- Section for Political Cooperation with the European Union
- Section for Economic and Sectoral Cooperation
- Regional Cooperation Section
- Directorate for Bilateral Cooperation
- Western, Central and South Eastern Europe Section
- North and South America Section
- Asia, Africa, Middle and Pacific Section
- Eastern Europe and Central Asia Section
- Economic Diplomacy Service
- Multilateral Cooperation Directorate
- UN Section and Specialized Agencies Section
- NATO Section and Political-Military Cooperation Section
- Council of Europe and Human Rights Section
- OSCE and International Security Section
- Directorate of International Law
- Multilateral Treatment Section
- Bilateral Section
- Legal Affairs Section
- Consular Business Directory
- Consular Relations Section
- Consular Section

Public Relations Department

- Policy Analysis, Monitoring and Evaluation Section
- Internal Audit Service
- Special Problems Service
- Directorate for Institutional Management
- Document Management Section and State Diplomatic Archives
- Budget and Finance Section
- Human Resources Section
- Information and Communication Technology Service
- Diplomatic Institute

== Duties ==
- Ensures the sovereign rights of the Republic of Moldova in international relations.
- Promotes Moldova's foreign policy in relations with other states and international organizations.
- Informs the President, Parliament and Government on major international events, and make proposals on Moldova's position towards them.
- Negotiates on behalf of the Republic of Moldova and participate in negotiating treaties and international agreements.
- Directs and controls the activity of diplomatic missions and consular offices of the Republic of Moldova to other countries and international organizations.
- Analyses internal and external situation of countries with which Moldova has diplomatic relations, identifies and evaluates development opportunities of trade and economic relations with these countries.
- Cooperates with the central specialized bodies and other structures of government in external economic relations and promotion of the state's unified policy externally.

== List of ministers ==
No.	Portrait	Name (Birth–Death)	Office term		Notes	Cabinet
1		Nicolae Țîu (born 1948)	6 June 1990	28 October 1993		Druc Muravschi Sangheli I
2		Mihai Popov (born 1949)	5 April 1994	28 July 1997		Sangheli II Ciubuc I
3		Nicolae Tăbăcaru (born 1955)	28 July 1997	23 November 2000		Ciubuc I-II Sturza Braghiș
4		Nicolae Cernomaz (1949–2023)	23 November 2000	27 July 2001		Braghiș Tarlev I
5		Nicolae Dudău (born 1945)	4 September 2001	4 February 2004		Tarlev I
6		Andrei Stratan (born 1966)	4 February 2004	25 September 2009	Deputy Prime Minister	Tarlev I-II Greceanîi I-II
7		Iurie Leancă (born 1963)	25 September 2009	30 May 2013	Deputy Prime Minister Acting Prime Minister (2013)	Filat I-II
8		Natalia Gherman (born 1969)	30 May 2013	20 January 2016	Deputy Prime Minister Acting Prime Minister (2015)	Leancă; Gaburici; Streleț
9		Andrei Galbur (born 1975)	20 January 2016	21 December 2017	Deputy Prime Minister	Filip
10		Tudor Ulianovschi (born 1983)	10 January 2018	8 June 2019		Filip
11		Nicu Popescu (born 1981)	8 June 2019	14 November 2019		Sandu
12		Aureliu Ciocoi (born 1968)	14 November 2019	16 March 2020		Chicu
13		Oleg Țulea (born 1980)	16 March 2020	9 November 2020		Chicu
14		Aureliu Ciocoi (born 1968)	9 November 2020	6 August 2021	Acting Prime Minister	Chicu
15		Nicu Popescu (born 1981)	6 August 2021	29 January 2024	Deputy Prime Minister	Gavrilița Recean
16		Mihai Popșoi (born 1987)	29 January 2024	Incumbent	Deputy Prime Minister	Recean Munteanu Tofan
