= Valerian Revenco =

Moldovan physician and politician (1939–2016)

Valerian Revenco OR

Minister of Health and Social Protection
- In office 19 April 2005 – 5 November 2005
- President: Vladimir Voronin
- Prime Minister: Vasile Tarlev
- Preceded by: Andrei Gherman (as Minister of Health)
- Succeeded by: Ion Ababii (as Minister of Health)

Minister of Labour and Social Protection
- In office 21 December 1999 – 19 April 2005
- President: Petru Lucinschi; Vladimir Voronin
- Prime Minister: Dumitru Braghiș; Vasile Tarlev
- Preceded by: Vladimir Gurițenco
- Succeeded by: Galina Balmoș

First Deputy Minister of Labour, Social Protection and Family
- In office 9 July 1998 – 27 December 1999
- President: Petru Lucinschi
- Prime Minister: Ion Ciubuc; Ion Sturza; Dumitru Braghiș
- Minister: Vladimir Gurițenco

Personal details
- Born: 1 December 1939 Bălți, Kingdom of Romania
- Died: 5 March 2016 (aged 76) Chișinău, Moldova
- Education: Chișinău State Institute of Medicine

Valerian Revenco (1 December 1939 – 5 March 2016) was a Moldovan politician who was Minister of Labor, Family and Social Protection (1999-2005) and Minister of Health (2005). He has been awarded the Order of Work Glory and the Order of the Republic. Revenco was married and had one child.

Revenco died on 5 March 2016, at the age of 76.
