= Victor Țopa =

Moldovan politician

Minister of Transport and Communication
- In office 19 April 2001 – 11 December 2001
- President: Vladimir Voronin
- Prime Minister: Vasile Tarlev
- Preceded by: Anatolie Smochin
- Succeeded by: Anatol Cupțov

Personal details
- Born: Șendreni, Moldavian SSR, Soviet Union
- Education: Kacha Military Aviation School

Victor Țopa (born 1 February 1967) is a Moldovan businessman and former politician. He served as the Minister of Transport of Moldova in 2001.
