= Second Filat Cabinet =

Government of Moldova

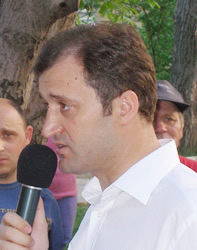
Vlad Filat (PLDM), in his second term as Prime Minister of Moldova.

The Second Filat Cabinet was the Cabinet of Moldova from 14 January 2011 to 30 May 2013. The Cabinet consisted of ministers from the Liberal Democratic Party of Moldova, the Democratic Party of Moldova, and the Liberal Party, who together formed the Alliance for European Integration. It was the second government to be led by Vlad Filat who was prime minister from 2009 until 2013. The Cabinet was installed after a successful vote of confidence held in the Parliament of Moldova on 14 January 2011.

== Composition ==
The Cabinet consisted of the Prime Minister of Moldova Vlad Filat (leader of the Liberal Democratic Party of Moldova; PLDM), three deputy prime ministers, each representing one of the parties of the coalition, 15 ministers, and two ex officio members.

=== Ministers ===
Title	Image	Name	Party	Term start	Term end
Prime Minister		Vlad Filat	PLDM	25 September 2009	25 April 2013
Deputy Prime Minister, Minister of Economy		Valeriu Lazăr	PDM	25 September 2009	3 July 2014
Deputy Prime Minister, Minister of Foreign Affairs and European Integration		Iurie Leancă	PLDM	25 September 2009	30 May 2013
Deputy Prime Minister for Reintegration		Eugen Carpov	PLDM	14 January 2011	18 February 2015
Deputy Prime Minister for Social Affairs		Mihai Moldovanu	PL	14 January 2011	30 May 2013
Minister of Finance		Veaceslav Negruța	PLDM	25 September 2009	14 August 2013
Minister of Justice		Alexandru Tănase	PLDM	25 September 2009	6 May 2011
Minister of Justice		Oleg Efrim	PLDM	6 May 2011	18 February 2015
Minister of Internal Affairs		Alexei Roibu	PLDM	14 January 2011	24 July 2012
Minister of Internal Affairs		Dorin Recean	PLDM	24 July 2012	18 February 2015
Minister of Defense		Vitalie Marinuța	PL	25 September 2009	27 February 2014
Minister of Regional Development and Construction		Marcel Răducan	PDM	25 September 2009	18 February 2015
Minister of Agriculture and Food Industry		Vasile Bumacov	PLDM	14 January 2011	18 February 2015
Minister of Transport and Roads Infrastructure		Anatol Șalaru	PL	25 September 2009	30 May 2013
Minister of Environment		Gheorghe Șalaru	PL	25 September 2009	5 June 2014
Minister of Education		Mihail Șleahtițchi	PLDM	14 January 2011	24 July 2012
Minister of Education		Maia Sandu	PLDM	24 July 2012	30 July 2015
Minister of Culture		Boris Focșa	PDM	25 September 2009	30 May 2013
Minister of Labour, Social Protection and Family		Valentina Buliga	PDM	25 September 2009	18 February 2015
Minister of Health		Andrei Usatîi	PLDM	14 January 2011	18 February 2015
Minister of Youth and Sport		Ion Cebanu	PL	25 September 2009	6 February 2013
Minister of Youth and Sport		Octavian Țîcu	PL	26 February 2013	30 May 2013
Minister of Information Technology and Communications		Pavel Filip	PDM	14 January 2011	20 January 2016

=== Ex officio members ===
The Başkan (Governor) of Gagauzia is elected by universal, equal, direct, secret and free suffrage on an alternative basis for a term of 4 years. One and the same person can be a governor for no more than two consecutive terms. The Başkan of Gagauzia is confirmed as a member of the Moldovan government by a decree of the President of Moldova.

Title	Image	Name	Party	Term start	Term end
Governor of Gagauzia		Mihail Formuzal	PRM	29 December 2006	23 March 2015
President of the Academy of Sciences of Moldova		Gheorghe Duca	Independent	24 August 2004	28 November 2018

Political forces	Seats	Moldovan Parliament seats after 2010 polls
Alliance for European Integration	59	
Party of Communists	42	
PCRM (42), PLDM (32), PDM (15), PL (12)

== See also ==
- Cabinet of Moldova

Preceded by First Filat Cabinet	Cabinet of Moldova; 14 January 2011 - 30 May 2013	Succeeded by Leancă Cabinet
