= Victor Bodiu =

Moldovan economist

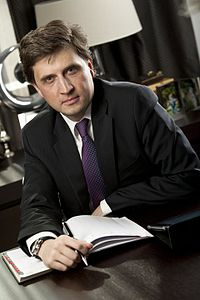
- Bodiu in 2011

Secretary General of the Government of Moldova
- In office 28 January 2011 – 22 December 2014
- President: Marian Lupu (acting); Nicolae Timofti
- Prime Minister: Vlad Filat; Iurie Leancă

Minister of State
- In office 25 September 2009 – 14 January 2011
- President: Mihai Ghimpu (acting); Vlad Filat (acting); Marian Lupu (acting)
- Prime Minister: Vlad Filat
- Preceded by: Vlad Filat (1999)

Personal details
- Born: 27 March 1971 (age 55) Chişinău, Moldavian SSR, Soviet Union
- Education: Moldova State University
- Profession: Economist

Victor Bodiu (born 27 March 1971) is a Moldovan economist. In 2001 he began working with Raiffeisen Banking Group.

== Early life ==
Victor Bodiu was born on 27 March 1971 in Chişinău. He holds a degree in Banking and Finance and a degree in Physics and Engineering.

== Career ==
His early career involved local and international consulting assignments with PriceWaterhouse LLP, Carana Corporation (USA) and IBTCI (USA consulting firm) for the Governments of Ukraine and Moldova on privatization issues, development of securities markets, stock exchange procedures, portfolio management, capital rising, financial markets, licensing procedures and taxation, export promotion and investment attraction.

From September 2001 until September 2009 he was employed with Raiffeisen, working in Austria, Romania, and Moldova. Until late 2005 Victor Bodiu was involved in transnational deals involving investment promotion in Austria, Poland, Romania, and Moldova.

His major task involved the management of Raiffeisen Investment activities in Romania and Moldova. Assisting strategic partners in their investment there on Direct Investment, Mergers and Acquisitions, privatizations, partnership and relationship building. He managed over 20 projects with a combined portfolio of more than 800 mil. EUR.

He was in charge of planning Raiffeisen's entry to the Moldovan market. As of January 2006 Bodiu was based in Moldova, as Managing Director of Raiffeisen Leasing Moldova.

From September 2009-December 2014 he was Secretary General of the Government of Moldova / Head of State Chancellery of the Moldovan Government.
