= Andrei Gherman =

Moldovan physician and politician (1941–2021)

Minister of Health
- In office 19 April 2001 – 19 April 2005
- President: Vladimir Voronin
- Prime Minister: Vasile Tarlev
- Preceded by: Vasile Parasca
- Succeeded by: Valerian Revenco

Personal details
- Born: 4 October 1941 Dumeni, Moldavian SSR, Soviet Union
- Died: 25 February 2021 (aged 79) Chișinău, Moldova
- Education: Chișinău State Institute of Medicine

Andrei Gherman (4 October 1941 – 25 February 2021) was a Moldovan physician and politician who served as Minister of Health.
