= Ministry of Health (Moldova) =

Government ministry of Moldova

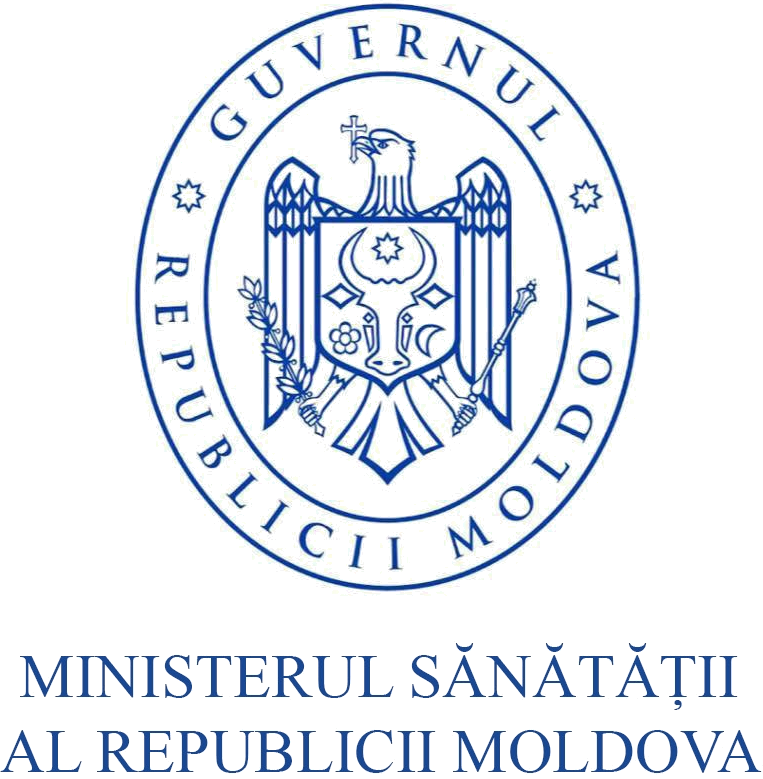

Ministry overview
- Formed: 6 June 1990; 36 years ago
- Preceding agencies: Ministry of Health, Labour and Social Protection (2017–2021); Ministry of Health and Social Protection (2005)
- Jurisdiction: Government of Moldova
- Headquarters: 2 Vasile Alecsandri Street, Chișinău
- Minister responsible: Alexandru Gasnaș, Minister of Health
- Ministry executives: Lilia Gantea, Secretary General; Svetlana Nicolaescu, Deputy Secretary General; Elena Bivol, Secretary of State; Iuliana Garam, Secretary of State; Diana Valuța, Secretary of State
- Website: ms.gov.md

The Ministry of Health (Romanian: Ministerul Sănătății) is one of the fourteen ministries of the Government of Moldova. The current health minister is Alexandru Gasnaș.

== List of ministers ==
No.	Portrait	Name (Birth–Death)	Office term		Cabinet
1		Gheorghe Ghidirim (born 1939)	6 June 1990	5 April 1994	Druc; Muravschi; Sangheli I
2		Timofei Moșneaga (1932–2014)	5 April 1994	24 January 1997	Sangheli II
3		Mihai Magdei (born 1945)	24 January 1997	22 May 1998	Ciubuc I
4		Eugen Gladun (1936–2014)	22 May 1998	21 December 1999	Ciubuc II; Sturza
5		Vasile Parasca (born 1948)	21 December 1999	19 April 2001	Braghiș
6		Andrei Gherman (1941–2021)	19 April 2001	19 April 2005	Tarlev I
7		Valerian Revenco (1939–2016)	19 April 2005	28 August 2009	Tarlev II
8		Ion Ababii (born 1944)	28 August 2009	31 March 2008	Tarlev II
9		Larisa Catrinici (born 1961)	31 March 2008	25 September 2009	Greceanîi I–II
10	Vladimir Hotineanu (2015-06-02)	Vladimir Hotineanu (1950–2019)	25 September 2009	14 January 2011	Filat I
11		Andrei Usatîi (born 1950)	14 January 2011	18 February 2015	Filat II
12		Mircea Buga (born 1968)	18 February 2015	30 July 2015	Gaburici
13		Ruxanda Glavan (born 1980)	30 July 2015	25 July 2017	Streleț; Filip
14		Stela Grigoraș (born 1968)	26 July 2017	21 December 2017	Filip
15		Svetlana Cebotari (born 1969)	10 January 2018	19 September 2018	Filip
16		Silvia Radu (born 1972)	25 September 2018	8 June 2019	Filip
17		Ala Nemerenco (born 1959)	8 June 2019	14 November 2019	Sandu
18	Viorica Dumbrăveanu - mar 2020	Viorica Dumbrăveanu (born 1976)	14 November 2019	31 December 2020	Chicu
19		Ala Nemerenco (born 1959)	6 August 2021	1 November 2025	Gavrilița Recean
20		Emil Ceban (born 1966)	1 November 2025	22 July 2026	Munteanu
21		Alexandru Gasnaș (born 1984)	22 July 2026	Incumbent	Tofan
