= Ministry of Labour and Social Protection (Moldova) =

Government ministry of Moldova

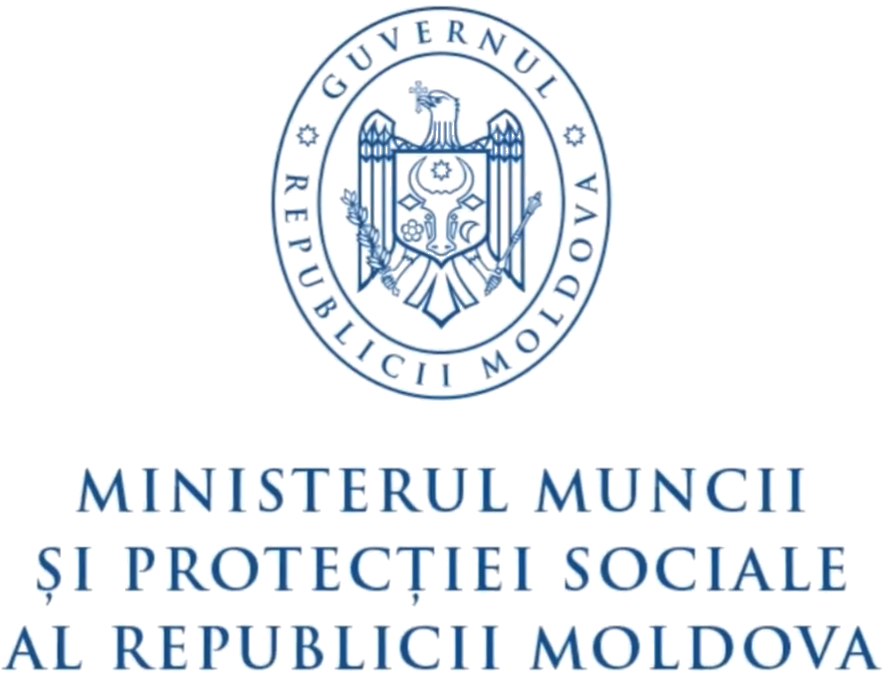

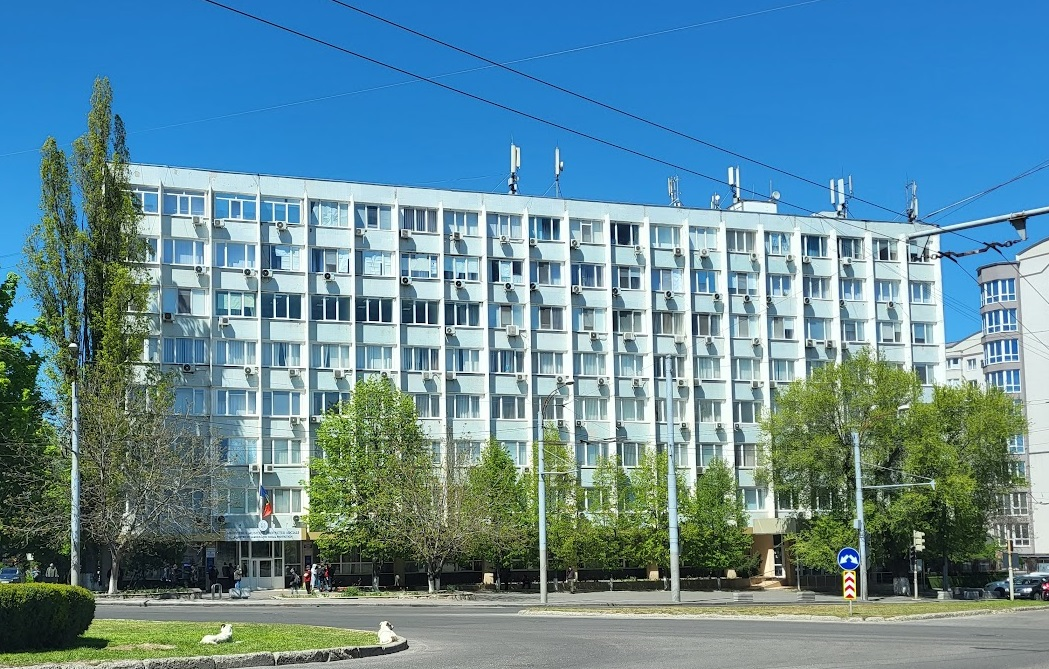
- Headquarters in Chișinău

Ministry overview
- Formed: 30 August 1992; 34 years ago
- Preceding agencies: Ministry of Health, Labour and Social Protection (2017–2021); Ministry of Labour, Social Protection and Family (1994–2001), (2009–2017); Ministry of Social Protection, Family and Child (2007–2009)
- Jurisdiction: Government of Moldova
- Headquarters: 1 Vasile Alecsandri Street, Chișinău
- Minister responsible: Natalia Plugaru, Minister of Labour and Social Protection
- Ministry executives: Vasile Cușca, Secretary of State; Felicia Bechtoldt, Secretary of State; Mihai-Gabriel Ciobanu, Secretary of State
- Website: social.gov.md

The Ministry of Labour and Social Protection (Romanian: Ministerul Muncii și Protecției Sociale) is one of the fourteen ministries of the Government of Moldova.

== List of ministers ==
No.	Portrait	Name (Birth–Death)	Office term		Cabinet
1		Dumitru Nidelcu (1942–2007)	30 August 1992	30 December 1997	Sangheli I–II Ciubuc I
2		Vasile Vartic (1943–2013)	22 January 1998	22 May 1998	Ciubuc I
3		Vladimir Gurițenco (born 1954)	22 May 1998	21 December 1999	Ciubuc II Sturza
4		Valerian Revenco (1939–2016)	21 December 1999	19 April 2005	Braghiș Tarlev I
5		Galina Balmoș (born 1961)	22 January 2007	25 September 2009	Tarlev II Greceanîi I–II
6		Valentina Buliga (born 1961)	25 September 2009	18 February 2015	Filat I–II Leancă
7		Ruxanda Glavan (born 1980)	18 February 2015	30 July 2015	Gaburici
8		Mircea Buga (born 1968)	30 July 2015	20 January 2016	Streleț
9		Stela Grigoraș (born 1968)	20 January 2016	26 July 2017	Filip
10		Marcel Spatari (born 1981)	6 August 2021	9 January 2023	Gavrilița
11		Alexei Buzu (born 1983)	9 January 2023	1 November 2025	Gavrilița Recean
12		Natalia Plugaru (born 1982)	1 November 2025	Incumbent	Munteanu Tofan
