= Eugen Osmochescu =

Moldovan economist and politician

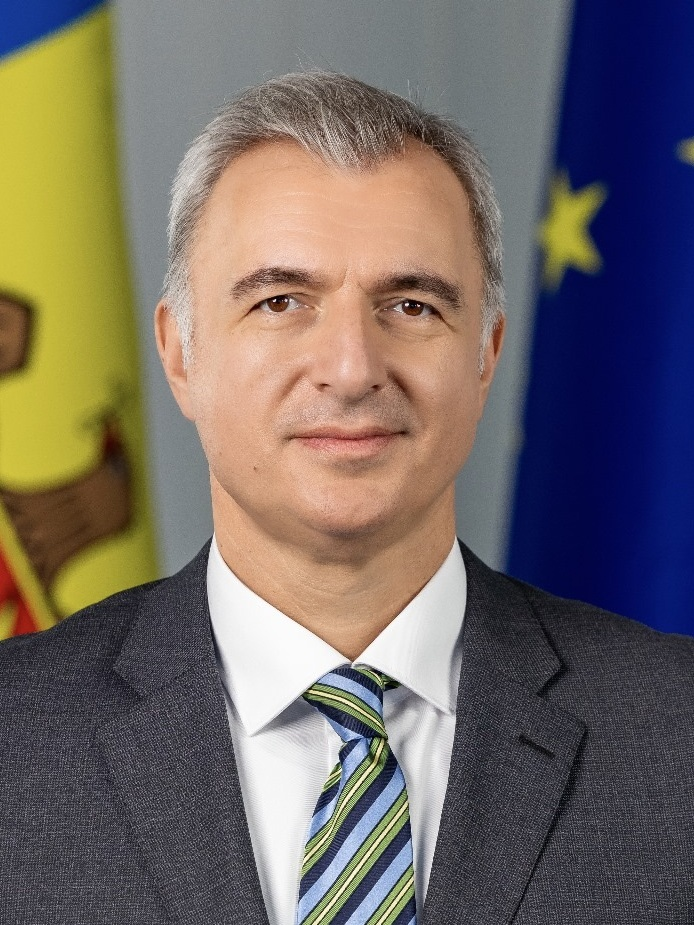
- Official portrait, 2025

Minister of Agriculture and Food Industry
- Incumbent
- Assumed office 28 August 2026
- President: Maia Sandu
- Prime Minister: Vasile Tofan
- Preceded by: Radu Musteața

Deputy Prime Minister of Moldova
- In office 1 November 2025 – 28 August 2026 Serving with: Mihai Popșoi; Vladimir Bolea
- President: Maia Sandu
- Prime Minister: Alexandru Munteanu; Himself (acting); Vasile Tofan
- Preceded by: Doina Nistor

Minister of Economic Development and Digitalization
- In office 1 November 2025 – 28 August 2026
- President: Maia Sandu
- Prime Minister: Alexandru Munteanu; Himself (acting); Vasile Tofan
- Preceded by: Doina Nistor
- Succeeded by: Claudiu Năsui

Acting Prime Minister of Moldova
- In office 8 July 2026 – 22 July 2026
- President: Maia Sandu
- Deputy: Himself; Mihai Popșoi; Vladimir Bolea; Cristina Gherasimov; Valeriu Chiveri
- Preceded by: Alexandru Munteanu
- Succeeded by: Vasile Tofan

Personal details
- Born: 31 July 1972 (age 54) Pryozerne, Ukrainian SSR, Soviet Union
- Education: Moldova State University; Maastricht University

Eugen Osmochescu (born 31 July 1972) is a Moldovan economist and jurist currently serving as Minister of Agriculture and Food Industry since August 2026. He also briefly served as acting prime minister of Moldova in July 2026.
