= Government of Moldova =

Government of the Republic of Moldova

Government of the Republic of Moldova Romanian: Guvernul Republicii Moldova
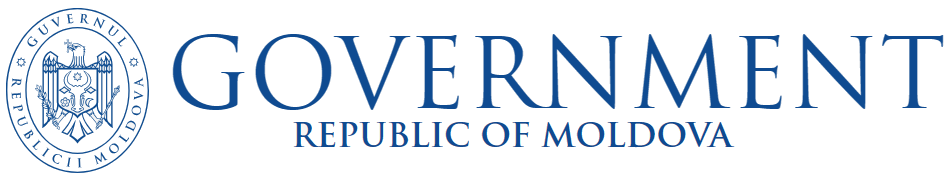
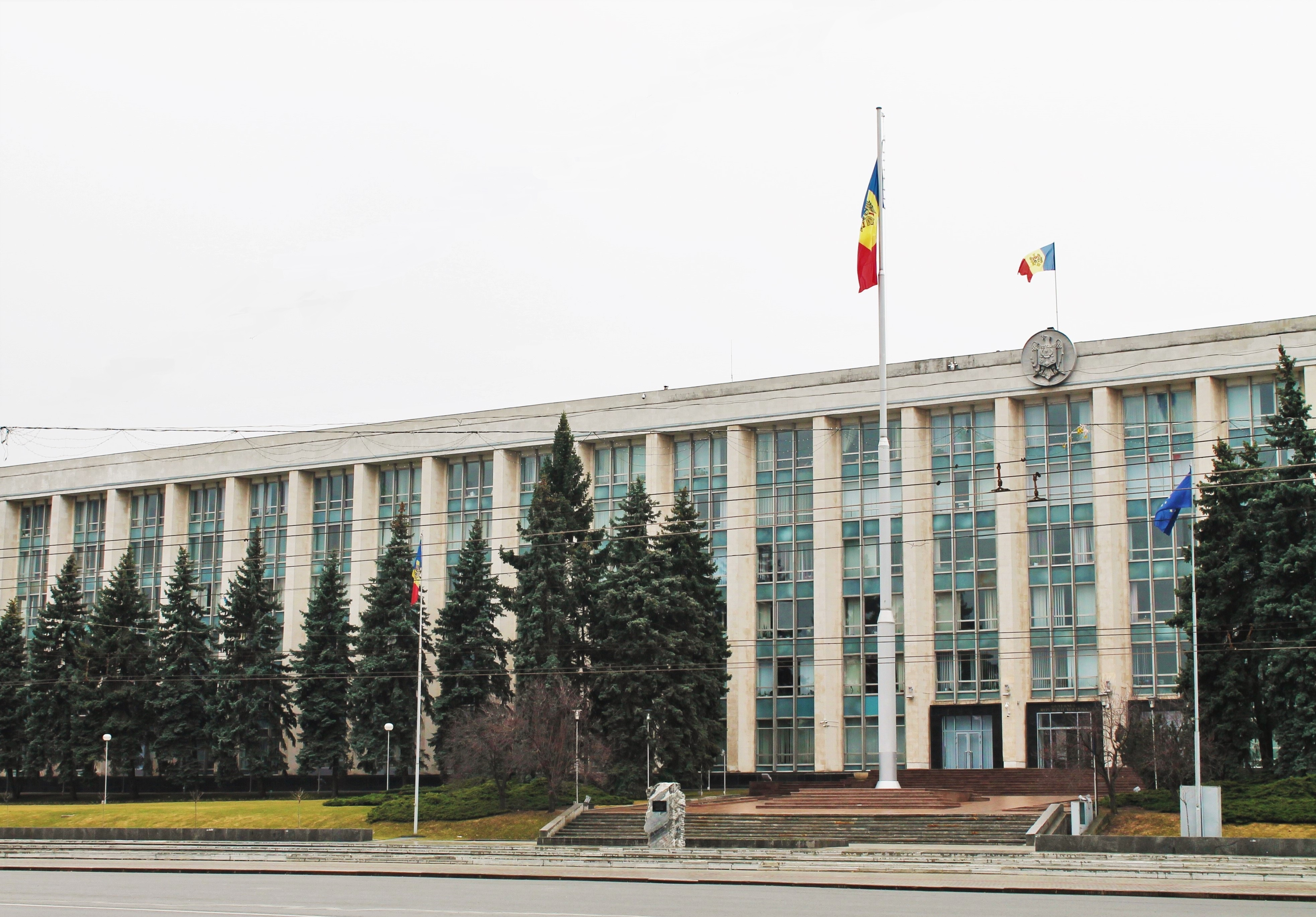
- Government House, Chișinău

Overview
- Established: 27 August 1991
- State: Moldova
- Leader: Prime Minister
- Appointed by: Parliament of Moldova (President's proposal)
- Main organ: Cabinet of Ministers
- Ministries: 14
- Responsible to: Parliament of Moldova
- Website: Official website

The government of Moldova (Romanian: Guvernul Republicii Moldova) is the government of the Republic of Moldova. It is housed in the Government House at the Great National Assembly Square in Chișinău, the capital of Moldova. Currently, the president of Moldova is Maia Sandu, while the prime minister of Moldova is Vasile Tofan. The current ruling cabinet of Moldova is the Tofan Cabinet, incumbent since 22 July 2026.

== See also ==
- Politics of Moldova
- Cabinet of Moldova
