= Nicolae Testemițanu State University of Medicine and Pharmacy =

Public University In Chisinau

Coordinates: 47°02′02″N 28°49′03″E

- Universitatea de Stat de Medicină și Farmacie „Nicolae Testemițanu”
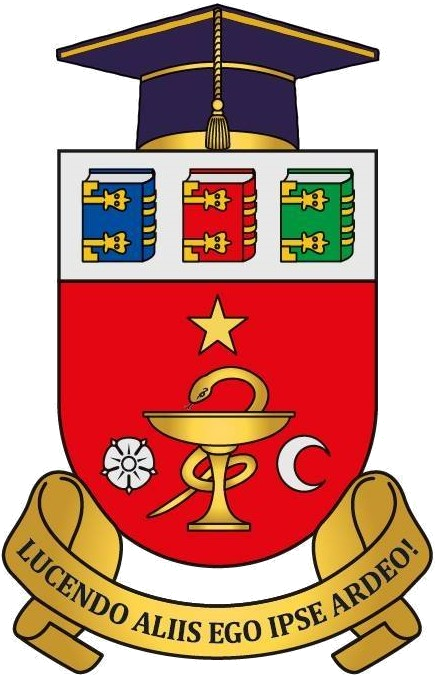
- Former name: Chișinău State Institute of Medicine (1945–1991)
- Motto: Lucendo allis ego ipse ardeo! (Latin)
- Motto in English: While I burn, I give light to others!
- Type: Public
- Established: 20 October 1945; 80 years ago
- Rector: Emil Ceban
- Students: 6,200
- Location: 165 Stephen the Great Boulevard, Chișinău, MD-2004, Moldova
- Website: usmf.md

The Nicolae Testemițanu State University of Medicine and Pharmacy (USMF; Romanian: Universitatea de Stat de Medicină și Farmacie „Nicolae Testemițanu”) is a medical university located in Chișinău, Moldova. The institution began its activity in 1945. It is named after Nicolae Testemițanu.

== History ==
The Chişinău State University of Pharmacy and Medicine was established as part of the Medicine Institute No. 2 from Leningrad, which was evacuated during the Second World War in Kislovodsk, which was later transferred to Chişinău together with the students and the teaching staff under the name of the State Institute of Medicine.

The Institute began its activity on October 20, 1945 with only one active faculty, that being General Medicine which had 32 departments and 1000 students. The didactic process was performed by 130 professors, including 20 habilitated doctors and 23 doctors in medical science. Through time other faculties were established, such as:

- Pediatric Faculty (1954)
- Stomatology Faculty (1959)
- Faculty of Preventive Medicine (1964)
- Pharmacy Faculty (1964)

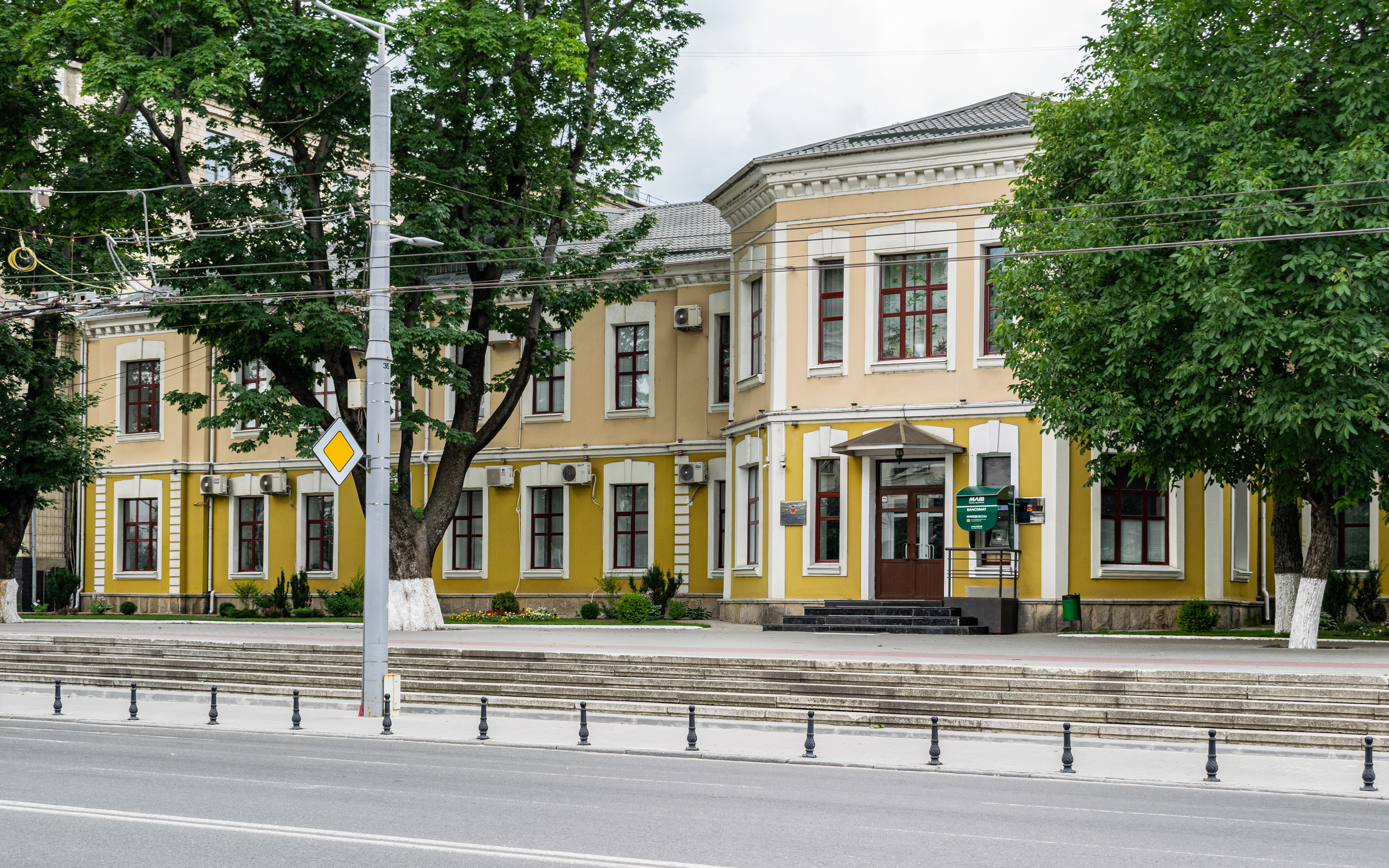
The administrative bloc of the university

Since 1990 the Institute has the name of Nicolae Testemiţanu. On July 25, 1991 the Nicolae Testemițanu State Institute of Medicine was reorganised as a university. In 1995, it was renamed to its current name.

== Faculties ==
- Medicine No. 1
- Medicine No. 2 (for foreign students)
- Pharmacy
- Stomatology
- Residence
- Department of Continuing Medical Education
- School of Public Health Management
- Doctoral School in the field of Medical Sciences

== Awards ==
- Order of Work Glory (2005)
- Order of the Republic (2015)

== See also ==
- List of universities in Moldova
- Education in Moldova
