= Alexeevca =

Alexeevca may refer to several places in Moldova:

- Alexeevca, Edineț, a commune in Edineț District
- Alexeevca, Florești, a commune in Florești District
- Alexeevca, Ungheni, a commune in Ungheni District
- Alexeevca, a village in Svetlîi Commune, Gagauzia
