= Vasile Iovv =

Moldovan politician (1942–2025)

Vasile Iovv OR

Member of the Moldovan Parliament
- In office 24 March 2005 – 24 December 2010
- Parliamentary group: Party of Communists
- In office 22 March 1998 – 29 January 2002
- Succeeded by: Ion Moiseev
- Parliamentary group: Party of Communists
- In office 10 April 1990 – 5 April 1994
- Succeeded by: Semion Drăgan
- Constituency: Bălți

First Deputy Prime Minister of Moldova
- In office 29 January 2002 – 19 April 2005
- President: Vladimir Voronin
- Prime Minister: Vasile Tarlev
- Preceded by: Nicolae Andronic (1999)
- Succeeded by: Zinaida Greceanîi

1st Minister of Transport and Roads Infrastructure
- In office 5 April 1994 – 22 May 1998
- President: Mircea Snegur; Petru Lucinschi
- Prime Minister: Andrei Sangheli; Ion Ciubuc
- Succeeded by: Tudor Leancă

Personal details
- Born: 26 December 1942 Corjova, Moldavian SSR, Soviet Union
- Died: 12 August 2025 (aged 82) Chișinău, Moldova

Vasile Iovv (26 December 1942 – 12 August 2025) was a Moldovan engineer and politician. He held the office of First Deputy Prime Minister of Moldova from 2002 until 2005. Iovv was the mayor of Bălți from 1976 to 1980.
