= Gheorghe Hioară =

Moldovan diplomat and politician (1948–2024)

Gheorghe Hioară OR

Moldovan Ambassador to Belarus
- In office 21 June 2010 – 30 March 2017
- President: Mihai Ghimpu (acting); Vladimir Filat (acting); Marian Lupu (acting); Nicolae Timofti; Igor Dodon
- Prime Minister: Vladimir Filat; Iurie Leancă; Chiril Gaburici; Natalia Gherman (acting); Valeriu Streleț; Gheorghe Brega (acting); Pavel Filip
- Preceded by: Valeriu Bobuțac
- Succeeded by: Victor Sorocean

Moldovan Ambassador to Bulgaria, Yugoslavia and Macedonia
- In office 31 December 1998 – 21 October 2002
- President: Petru Lucinschi; Vladimir Voronin
- Prime Minister: Ion Ciubuc; Ion Sturza; Dumitru Braghiș; Vasile Tarlev
- Preceded by: Mihai Coșcodan
- Succeeded by: Vasile Sturza

Member of the Moldovan Parliament
- In office 17 April 1990 – 27 February 1994
- Parliamentary group: Popular Front
- Constituency: Chișinău

Personal details
- Born: 15 August 1948 Alexandru Ioan Cuza, Moldavian SSR, Soviet Union
- Died: 15 December 2024 (aged 76)
- Party: Popular Front of Moldova
- Education: Moldova State University; Moscow State University
- Profession: Diplomat

Gheorghe Hioară (15 August 1948 – 15 December 2024) was a Moldovan diplomat and politician. He was the ambassador to Belarus from 2010 to 2017.

== Life and career ==
Hioară was born on 15 August 1948, in the Moldovan SSR. He studied at Moscow State University between 1997 and 2003. In 1997, he was appointed a member of the embassy staff in Bulgaria and became the Ambassador of Moldova to Bulgaria in 1998. He would maintain this position until 2003. He served as a member of the Parliament of Moldova and ambassador to Bulgaria (1998–2003). Hioară was appointed to the position of Ambassador of Moldova to Belarus in July 2010 and several months later, he was appointed the Permanent Representative of Moldova in CIS statutory bodies. He was recalled on 24 March 2017. Apart from his native Romanian, Hioară spoke Russian, French, Bulgarian.

Hioară died on 15 December 2024, at the age of 76.
