= Valentin Cunev =

Moldovan politician (1946–2023)

Valentin Cunev OR

Deputy Prime Minister of Moldova
- In office 4 August 1992 – 24 January 1997 Serving with: Mihai Coșcodan; Nicolae Oleinic; Ion Guțu; Valeriu Bulgari
- President: Mircea Snegur; Petru Lucinschi
- Prime Minister: Andrei Sangheli
- Preceded by: Gheorghe Efros
- Parliamentary group: Democratic Agrarian Party

Member of the Moldovan Parliament
- In office 27 February 1994 – 5 April 1994
- Succeeded by: Simion Jeleapov
- In office 10 March 1990 – 4 August 1992
- Constituency: Chișinău

Personal details
- Born: 25 February 1946
- Died: 24 October 2023 (aged 77)

Valentin Cunev (25 February 1946 – 24 October 2023) was a Moldovan architect and politician. He served as Deputy Prime Minister of Moldova under Prime Minister Andrei Sangheli.
