= Anatol Grimalschi =

Moldovan minister from 1998 to 1999

Minister of Education and Science
- In office 22 May 1998 – 21 December 1999
- President: Petru Lucinschi
- Prime Minister: Ion Ciubuc; Ion Sturza
- Preceded by: Iacob Popovici
- Succeeded by: Ion Guțu

Personal details
- Born: 12 September 1951 (age 75) Chiperceni, Moldavian SSR, Soviet Union
- Education: Technical University of Moldova

Anatol Grimalschi (born 12 September 1951) is a Moldovan physicist, engineer and former politician. He held the office of Minister of Education of Moldova from 1998 to 1999.
