= Valeriu Bobuțac =

Moldovan politician and diplomat

Moldovan Ambassador to Belarus
- In office 16 June 2009 – 21 November 2009
- President: Vladimir Voronin; Mihai Ghimpu (acting)
- Prime Minister: Zinaida Greceanîi; Vitalie Pîrlog (acting); Vladimir Filat
- Preceded by: Ion Filimon
- Succeeded by: Gheorghe Hioară

Moldovan Ambassador to Hungary, Bosnia and Herzegovina, Slovenia and Croatia
- In office 25 January 2005 – 30 April 2009
- President: Vladimir Voronin
- Prime Minister: Vasile Tarlev; Zinaida Greceanîi
- Preceded by: Mihail Laur
- Succeeded by: Alexandru Codreanu

First Deputy Minister of Foreign Affairs
- In office 9 November 2001 – 27 June 2002
- President: Vladimir Voronin
- Prime Minister: Vasile Tarlev
- Minister: Nicolae Dudău

Moldovan Ambassador to Russia, Kazakhstan and Finland
- In office 18 March 1997 – 1 February 2002
- President: Petru Lucinschi; Vladimir Voronin
- Prime Minister: Ion Ciubuc; Ion Sturza; Dumitru Braghiș; Vasile Tarlev
- Preceded by: Valeriu Pasat
- Succeeded by: Vladimir Țurcan

Deputy Prime Minister of Moldova
- In office 5 April 1994 – 24 January 1997
- President: Mircea Snegur; Petru Lucinschi
- Prime Minister: Andrei Sangheli
- Succeeded by: Ion Guțu

Minister of Economy
- In office 5 April 1994 – 24 January 1997
- President: Mircea Snegur; Petru Lucinschi
- Prime Minister: Andrei Sangheli
- Preceded by: Sergiu Certan
- Succeeded by: Ion Guțu (as Minister of Economy and Reforms)

Personal details
- Born: 13 March 1945 (age 81) Hancăuți, Moldavian SSR, Soviet Union

Valeriu Bobuțac (born 13 March 1945) is a Moldovan politician and diplomat who served as Deputy Prime Minister and Minister of Economy of Moldova from 1994 until 1997.
