= Cotiujenii Mari =

- Commune
- Location in Moldova
- Coordinates: 47°51′N 28°33′E
- Country: Moldova
- District: Șoldănești District
- Elevation: 745 ft (227 m)

Population (2014)
  - Total: 3,141
- Time zone: UTC+2 (EET)
  - Summer (DST): UTC+3 (EEST)
- Postcode: MD-7216
- Area code: +373 272

Cotiujenii Mari is a commune in Șoldănești District, Moldova. It is composed of three villages: Cotiujenii Mari, Cușelăuca and Cobîlea station.

== Notable people ==
- Nicolae Andronic, politician
- Ion Cazacliu
- Grigore Cazacliu
- Vladimir Cazacliu
- Simeon G. Murafa (1887-1917), jurist, journalist, and politician.
- Anatolie Popa
- Aurelian Silvestru
- Gheorghe Urschi (born 1948)
