= Nicolae Andronic =

Moldovan, jurist, and lawyer

Nicolae Andronic OR
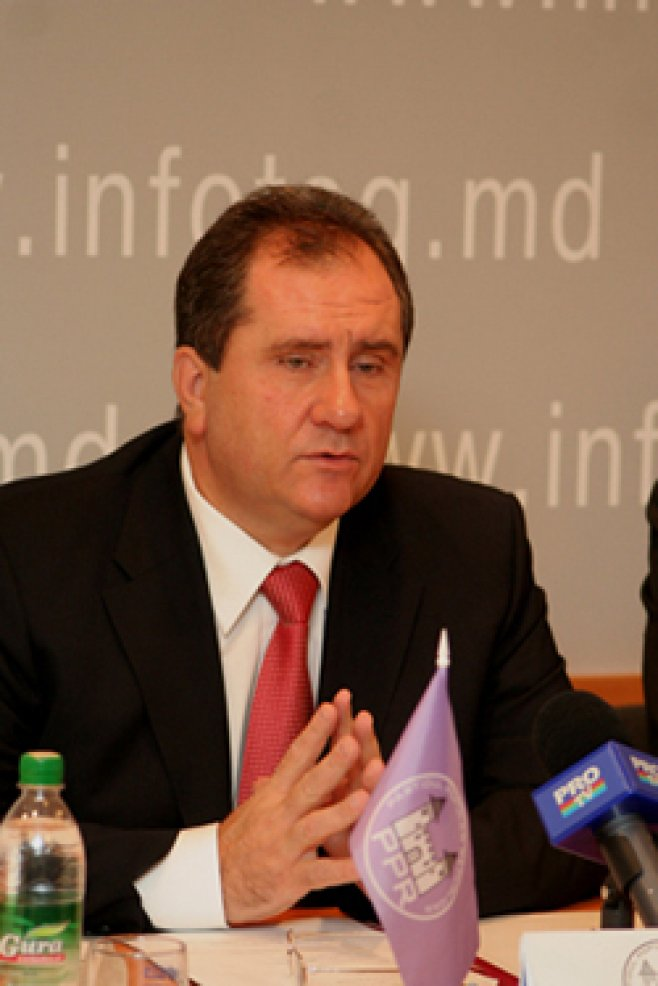
- Andronic in 2012

First Deputy Prime Minister of Moldova
- In office 12 March 1999 – 12 November 1999
- President: Petru Lucinschi
- Prime Minister: Ion Sturza
- Preceded by: Nicolae Andronati (1994)
- Succeeded by: Vasile Iovv (2002)

Deputy Prime Minister of Moldova for Judicial Affairs
- In office 22 May 1998 – 19 February 1999
- President: Petru Lucinschi
- Prime Minister: Ion Ciubuc; Ion Sturza

Member of the Moldovan Parliament
- In office 3 September 1990 – 22 May 1998
- Succeeded by: Vasile Cotună
- Constituency: Chișinău

Vice President of the Moldovan Parliament
- In office 29 March 1994 – 22 July 1995
- President: Mircea Snegur
- Prime Minister: Andrei Sangheli
- Speaker: Petru Lucinschi
- Succeeded by: Dumitru Diacov

Personal details
- Born: 13 May 1959 (age 67) Cotiujenii Mari, Moldavian SSR, Soviet Union
- Party: Our Party / Republican Popular Party (2004-2015)
- Children: 2 sons (Alexandru and Cristian)
- Education: State University of Moldova
- Occupation: Jurist, lawyer, politician

Nicolae Andronic (born 13 May 1959) is a Moldovan jurist and lawyer. He served as member of Parliament of Moldova between 1990 and 1998 and as Deputy Speaker of the Parliament of Moldova in 1994. He headed the extra-parliamentary Republican Popular Party from 2005 to 2015.

== Early life ==
Nicolae Andronic was born on May 13, 1959, in the village of Cotiujenii Mari, Soroca region, into a family of intellectuals. In 1981, at the Faculty of Law of the State University of Moldova, he obtained the Ph.D. in law. He is married and has two children.

== Professional activity ==
In the years 1981-1986 working as probationer, investigator at Straseni district prosecutor’s office, senior investigator at prosecutor’s offices of Frunze, Soviet districts, Chisinau city. In 1986 he worked as a Senior expert at juridical section of the Office of the Presidium of the Supreme Soviet of the MSSR. In the years 1990–1992 working as a senior consultant of the Republic of Moldova Parliament’s leadership. He is a lawyer since 2001 until now.

== Political activity ==
In 1989, he was the member of the commission for drafting law on languages in the Republic of Moldova. From 1990 to 1998 Nicolae Andronic was elected as member of the Parliament of the Republic of Moldova. In 1994, he was appointed deputy chairman of the Parliament. From 1993 to 1994 he was chairman of the Commissions for Juridical and Law reform, which started the legal reforms in Moldova and member of the Commission on drafting the text of new Constitution. In 1999 he was chairman of the commission for territorial reform and decentralization of state power. On May 22, 1998, Nicolae Andronic was appointed deputy prime minister; he held the function during Ion Ciubuc Cabinet II, and then from 1999 to 2000, he held the function of first deputy prime minister in Ion Sturza Cabinet. From 2005 to 2015 he was the chairman of the Republican Popular Party.

On April 13, 2014, at a Republican Popular Party congress, Nicolae Andronic gave the party to Renato Usatîi, renaming it to "Our Party" (Romanian: Partidul Nostru). However, two months later Ministry of Justice rejected these changes, invoking irregularities in the procedure of convening congress.

On February 8, 2015, took place the repeated 4th Congress of Republican Popular Party, during which all the previous actions were repeated and, party was renamed, was elected a new chairman of party (Renato Usatîi), and was changed the party statute and program, with a unanimous vote of all the 97 delegates attending at the congress.

== Works ==
Books

- Nicolae Andronic - „Opt ani în Parlament”
- Nicolae Andronic - „Suveranitatea de Stat a Republicii Moldova”
- Nicolae Andronic - „Cotiujenii Mari”

== Decorations ==
- Order of the Republic (Moldova) (2012)
- Order of Honour (Moldova) (2011)
- "Meritul Civic" Medal (1996)
- Church decorations for as sponsor of some sacred bays.
