= Dumitru Braghiș =

Moldovan politician, diplomat, and economist

Dumitru Braghiș OR
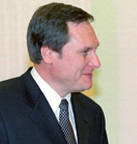
- Braghiș in 2001.

5th Prime Minister of Moldova
- In office 21 December 1999 – 19 April 2001
- President: Petru Lucinschi; Vladimir Voronin
- Deputy: See list: Valeriu Cosarciuc Lidia Guțu Eugeniu Șlopac Andrei Cucu
- Preceded by: Ion Sturza
- Succeeded by: Vasile Tarlev

Moldovan Ambassador to China and Vietnam
- In office 17 June 2020 – 4 December 2025
- President: Igor Dodon; Maia Sandu
- Prime Minister: Ion Chicu; Aureliu Ciocoi (acting); Natalia Gavrilița; Dorin Recean; Alexandru Munteanu
- Preceded by: Denis Jelimalai
- Succeeded by: Petru Frunze

Moldovan Ambassador to Russia, Kazakhstan and Kyrgyzstan
- In office 28 October 2015 – 3 March 2017
- President: Nicolae Timofti; Igor Dodon
- Prime Minister: Valeriu Streleț; Gheorghe Brega (acting); Pavel Filip
- Preceded by: Andrei Galbur
- Succeeded by: Andrei Neguța

Member of the Moldovan Parliament
- In office 20 March 2001 – 22 April 2009
- Parliamentary group: Braghiș Alliance; Our Moldova Alliance; Democratic Moldova Electoral Bloc; Social Democratic Party

First Deputy Minister of Economy and Reforms
- In office 9 July 1998 – 21 December 1999
- President: Petru Lucinschi
- Prime Minister: Ion Ciubuc; Ion Sturza
- Minister: Ion Sturza; Alexandru Muravschi

Deputy Minister of Economy and Reforms
- In office 11 February 1997 – 9 July 1998
- President: Petru Lucinschi
- Prime Minister: Ion Ciubuc
- Minister: Ion Guțu; Ion Sturza

People's Deputy of the Soviet Union
- In office 26 March 1989 – 5 September 1991
- Constituency: Fălești

Personal details
- Born: 28 December 1957 (age 68) Grătiești, Moldavian SSR, Soviet Union
- Party: Social Democratic Party (Moldova)
- Other political affiliations: Party Alliance Our Moldova
- Education: Technical University of Moldova

Dumitru Braghiș (Romanian: [ˈbraɡiʃ]; born 28 December 1957) is a Moldovan politician, diplomat and economist. He was the Prime Minister of Moldova from 1999 until 2001. Then, he was a member of the Parliament of Moldova, where he represented the Party Alliance Our Moldova. He was chairman of the Party of Social Democracy and deputy in the Parliament of the Republic of Moldova (2005–2009).

== Biography ==
Dumitru Braghiș was born on December 28, 1957, in the village of Grătieşti, Chișinău municipality, in a family of peasants. In 1975, he finished a secondary school no. 1 in Chişinău and in 1980 he graduated Technical University, specialising in power engineering, working as an engineer-constructor at the Tractor's Factory. He has Ph.D. in Economics. Through 1981 to 1992 he held various eligible positions in the Komsomol. In 1987 through 1988 he was an instructor in Central Committee of Communist Party of Moldova. Braghiș was elected as deputy in the Supreme Soviet of the Soviet Union in 1989 through 1991. Through 1992–1995 Braghiș became the General Deputy Director of "Moldova EXIM" Association. Through 1995–1997 Braghiș was the General Director of the Department for Foreign Economic relations of the Ministry of Finance.

In 1997, through 1999, Braghiș was the Deputy Minister of Economy and Reforms. Braghiș became the Prime Minister of Moldova in 1999 through April 2001. Since 2001 Braghiș has been a deputy in Parliament of the Republic of Moldova. In the 2005 parliamentary elections, he was elected as a deputy in the lists of the Electoral Bloc Democratic Moldova, becoming chairman of this party. In July 2005, he was an independent candidate for the Chisinau City Mayor's General Election, gaining 20.65% of the votes. Since 2006, he has served as the chairman of the Social Democratic Party. He has also run for election on June 3, 2007, from the Party of Social Democracy of Moldova (PSDM). After the expiration of his mandate of deputy in 2009, until 2013 he worked in the private sector. On 27 November 2015, he became the Extraordinary and Plenipotentiary Ambassador of the Republic of Moldova to the Russian Federation. He was dismissed from this role in early 2017.

Dumitru Braghiș speaks English, French and Russian. He is married and has a child.

== See also ==
- Chișinău election, 2005

Political offices
Preceded by Ion Sturza	Prime Minister of Moldova; 1999-2001	Succeeded by Vasile Tarlev
