= Gheorghe Urschi =

Moldovan actor and comedian (1948–2026)

Gheorghe Urschi OR
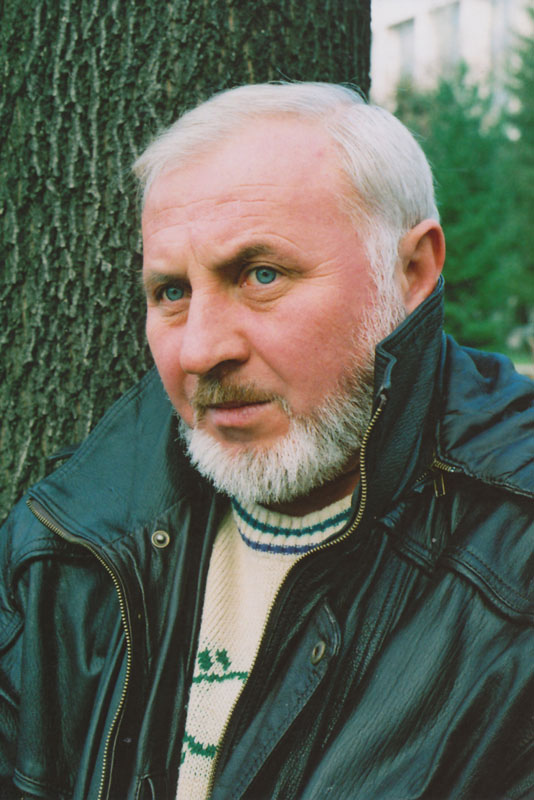
- Urschi in 2000
- Born: 18 January 1948; Cotiujenii Mari, Șoldănești District, Moldavian SSR, Soviet Union
- Died: 13 April 2026 (aged 78); Chișinău, Moldova
- Resting place: Chișinău Central Cemetery
- Education: Boris Shchukin Theatre Institute
- Occupations: Actor, director, screenwriter, humorist
- Years active: 1970s–2011
- Spouse: Maria Urschi (died 2024)
- Children: Two

Gheorghe Urschi (18 January 1948 – 13 April 2026) was a Moldovan actor, director, screenwriter, and humorist. He was nicknamed "The King of Moldovan Humor" and "The King of Humor of Moldova." He was active for more than 40 years. In 2012 he was awarded the title of People's Artist of Moldova by President Nicolae Timofti.

== Biography ==
Urschi was born on 18 January 1948 in the village of Cotiujenii Mari, Șoldănești District. He studied acting at the Boris Shchukin Theatre Institute in Moscow (1965–1969).

After completing his studies in Moscow, he was hired as an actor at the Luceafărul Theatre in Chișinău. He performed in many theatrical plays and directed dozens of productions: The Nameless Star (Station Master), Sergei Lazo (The Commissar), Steel Toys (Christas), The Game of Love and Chance (Harlequin).

Over the course of more than 40 years of activity, he wrote books and plays, and produced numerous television programmes and concerts. He wrote the theatrical plays: The Youngest (1979), We Shall Live and See (1986), The Testament (1992), The Testament – 2 (2001), Two Cranes, Two Violins (2003), And Chirița Again! (2006), and a dozen plays for children; some of these he also directed and performed in. The Testament holds a record for the Bessarabian stage, having been performed continuously for 30 years.

Urschi wrote several volumes of short stories: The Girls' Hill (1977); The Island of Adolescence (1980); The Boy with the Guitar (1981); Cases and Troubles (1986); I'm Going Crazy (1995); Selected Writings in 3 volumes (2008). The first volume contains novellas and short stories, the second theatrical plays, and the third sketches, monologues, and miniatures. During the 1970s and 1980s, Urschi also translated a substantial body of literature from Russian, including works by Maxim Gorky, Vampilov, and Astafiev. He wrote lyrics and music for several songs, light music pieces, and romances.

He wrote the screenplays and directed three films: Mînia (1974), Văleu, văleu, nu turna! (1991), and Fenta (2004).

He became well known through his televised programme Theatre of Miniatures, as well as concerts held across Moldovan villages in the 1980s and 1990s alongside his wife Maria Urschi, and through duets with Iurie Sadovnic and with Ion and Doina Aldea-Teodorovici. Urschi was known especially as a creator of humorous programmes in which he satirised human stupidity, excessive use of Russian loanwords, laziness, arrogance, drunkenness, and corruption, performing alongside actors Vitalie Rusu, Gheorghe Pârlea, and others.

Urschi was a member of the Theatre Union and the Writers' Union of Moldova.

In June 2011, he suffered a stroke, followed by a year of hospitalization, including four months at a rehabilitation clinic in Israel.

In 2008 he was awarded the distinction of Knight of the Order of the Republic.

On 20 July 2012, President Nicolae Timofti conferred upon him the title of "People's Artist" for achievements in creative activity and merits in the development of the satirical-artistic genre.

On 18 January 2014, his birthday, he became an honorary citizen of Chișinău municipality.

On 26 August 2019, Urschi became a Laureate of the National Prize.

He was married to Maria Urschi until her death on 9 August 2024. He had two daughters, Laura and Liliana. The Urschi couple maintained a close friendship with Ion Aldea-Teodorovici and Doina Aldea-Teodorovici.

On 13 April 2026, Urschi died in Chișinău at the age of 78.

== Critical assessments ==
Gheorghe Urschi is the king of humor in the Republic of Moldova. He writes plays, directs them, and performs in them himself. His humor is not malicious. What more can I say... There are few like him. I would suggest to those at the television stations that they not remove him from the broadcast schedule, because we do not have a second Urschi.

— Gheorghe Pârlea

Humor individualizes the oral style of Urschi's stories. Reading his stories, you sense his smile between the lines. He laughs even when he weaves dramatic or tragic fragments.

— Ariadna Șalari

== Filmography ==
| Year | Title | Role | Notes |
|---|---|---|---|
| 1974 | Mînia | Gheorghe Urschi | |
| 1989 | He Who Pays the Piper | | Screenplay and director |
| 1991 | Văleu, văleu, nu turna! | | Screenplay and director |
| 2004 | Fenta | | Screenplay and director |

== Writings ==
- The Girls' Hill / Short Stories – Chișinău: Literary Art, 1977. 173 p.
- The Island of Adolescence – Chișinău: Literary Art, 1980. 114 p.
- The Boy with the Guitar – Chișinău: Literary Art, 1981. 83 p.
- Cases and Troubles / Humorous Sketches and Stories – Chișinău: Literary Art, 1986. 90 p.
- I'm Going Crazy!: Sketches, Monologues and Whimsy – Chișinău: Cultural Foundation "Vatra", 1995. 238 p. ISBN 5-7790-0284-3
- Writings – Chișinău: Prometeu, 2007. ISBN 978-9975-919-63-0

== Bibliography ==
- Gheorghe Urschi // National Calendar 2008, Chișinău, pp. 41–42
