= Usatîi =

Usatîi is a surname. Notable people with the surname include:

- Renato Usatîi, Moldovan businessman and politician
- Andrei Usatîi (born 1950), Moldovan politician
- Anatol Usatîi (born 1976), Moldovan politician
