= Ion Guțu =

Moldovan politician (born 1943)

Ion Guţu OR

Member of the Moldovan Parliament
- In office 22 March 2005 – 22 April 2009
- Parliamentary group: Our Moldova Alliance
- In office 17 April 1990 – 27 February 1994
- Constituency: Ocnița

Minister of Education and Science
- In office 21 December 1999 – 22 November 2000
- President: Petru Lucinschi
- Prime Minister: Dumitru Braghiș
- Preceded by: Anatol Grimalschi
- Succeeded by: Ilie Vancea

Minister of Economy and Reforms
- In office 24 January 1997 – 22 May 1998
- President: Petru Lucinschi
- Prime Minister: Ion Ciubuc
- Preceded by: Valeriu Bobuțac (as Minister of Economy)
- Succeeded by: Ion Sturza

Deputy Prime Minister of Moldova
- In office 5 April 1994 – 22 May 1998
- President: Mircea Snegur; Petru Lucinschi
- Prime Minister: Andrei Sangheli; Ion Ciubuc
- Preceded by: Mihai Coșcodan
- Succeeded by: Ion Sturza

Personal details
- Born: 7 January 1943 (age 83) Egoreni, Moldavian SSR, Soviet Union
- Party: Party Alliance Our Moldova
- Other political affiliations: Electoral Bloc Democratic Moldova

Ion Guţu (born 7 January 1943) is a Moldovan politician and member of the Parliament of Moldova (1990–1994 and 2005–2009).
