= Vitalie Gorincioi =

Moldovan politician (born 1953)

Vitalie Gorincioi OR

Minister of Agriculture and Food Industry
- In office 23 July 1992 – 24 January 1997
- President: Mircea Snegur; Petru Lucinschi
- Prime Minister: Andrei Sangheli
- Preceded by: Andrei Sangheli
- Succeeded by: Gheorghe Lungu

Member of the Moldovan Parliament
- In office 27 February 1994 – 5 April 1994
- Succeeded by: Petru Carauș
- Parliamentary group: Democratic Agrarian Party

Personal details
- Born: September 16, 1953 (age 72) Lidovca, Moldavian SSR, Soviet Union

Vitalie Gorincioi (born 16 September 1953) is a Moldovan politician. He served as the Minister of Agriculture and Food Industry of Moldova from 1992 to 1997.
