= Constantin Oboroc =

Moldovan politician and engineer

Constantin Oboroc OR

Advisor to the President
- In office 29 July 1992 – 2 December 1996
- President: Mircea Snegur

First Deputy Prime Minister of Moldova
- In office 6 June 1990 – 5 February 1992 Serving with: Andrei Sangheli; Ion Ciubuc
- President: Mircea Snegur
- Prime Minister: Mircea Druc; Valeriu Muravschi
- Succeeded by: Nicolae Andronati

People's Deputy of the Soviet Union
- In office 26 March 1989 – 6 June 1990

Personal details
- Born: 2 November 1950 (age 75) Cozești, Moldavian SSR, Soviet Union
- Party: Popular Front of Moldova

Constantin Oboroc (born 2 November 1950) is a Moldovan politician and engineer. He served as First Deputy Prime Minister of Moldova in the Mircea Druc and Valeriu Muravschi cabinets.
