= Sergiu Certan =

Minister of Economy
- In office 1 July 1992 – 5 April 1994
- President: Mircea Snegur
- Prime Minister: Andrei Sangheli
- Preceded by: Constantin Tampiza
- Succeeded by: Valeriu Bobuțac

Personal details
- Born: April 17, 1952 (age 74) Chișinău, Moldavian SSR, Soviet Union

Sergiu Certan (born 17 April 1952) is a Moldovan economist and academic who served as the Minister of Economy of Moldova from 1992 to 1994.
