= Gheorghe Lungu =

Gheorghe Lungu may refer to:

- Gheorghe Lungu (boxer) (born 1978), Romanian boxer
- Gheorghe Lungu (politician) (born 1949), Moldovan politician
