= Caragaș =

Caragaș Карагаш (Russian and Ukrainian)
- Village
- Location within Moldova
- Coordinates: 46°46′50″N 29°41′4″E
- Country (de jure): Moldova
- Country (de facto): Transnistria (Note: Transnistria's political status is disputed. It considers itself to be an independent state, but this is not recognised by any UN member state. The Moldovan government and the international community consider Transnistria a part of Moldova's territory.)
- Elevation: 29 m (95 ft)

Population (2000)
  - Total: 1,800
- Time zone: UTC+2 (EET)
  - Summer (DST): UTC+3 (EEST)

Caragaș (Moldovan Cyrillic, Ukrainian, and Russian: Карагаш, romanized: Karagash) is a village in the Slobozia District of Transnistria, Moldova. It is currently under the administration of the breakaway government of the Transnistrian Moldovan Republic.

According to the 2004 census, the population of the village was 4,766 inhabitants, of which 3,384 (71%) were Moldovans (Romanians), 436 (9.14%) Ukrainians and 820 (17.2%) Russians.

== Notable people ==
- Nicolae Andronati (1935–2026), politician
