= Oleg Stratulat =

Moldovan politician (born 1957)

Deputy Prime Minister of Moldova for Social Policy and Science
- In office 22 May 1998 – 21 December 1999
- President: Petru Lucinschi
- Prime Minister: Ion Ciubuc; Ion Sturza
- Succeeded by: Lidia Guțu

Member of the Moldovan Parliament
- In office 25 April 1997 – 22 May 1998
- Preceded by: Lidia Istrati
- Succeeded by: Gheorghe Străisteanu
- Parliamentary group: Bloc of Peasants and Intellectuals; Party of Democratic Forces

Personal details
- Born: 22 February 1957 (age 69) Slobozia-Horodiște, Moldavian SSR, Soviet Union
- Education: Moldova State University; Technical University of Moldova; Academy of Economic Studies of Moldova

Oleg Stratulat (born 22 February 1957) is a Moldovan economist and politician.
