= Sergiu Răilean =

Moldovan politician (born 1976)

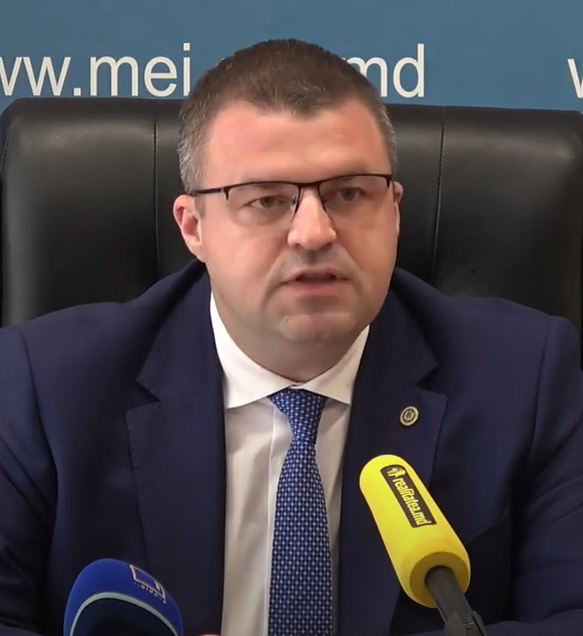
- Răilean in 2020

Minister of Economy and Infrastructure
- In office 16 March 2020 – 9 November 2020
- President: Igor Dodon
- Prime Minister: Ion Chicu
- Preceded by: Anatol Usatîi
- Succeeded by: Anatol Usatîi

Personal details
- Born: 12 April 1976 (age 50) Sculeni, Moldavian SSR, Soviet Union
- Education: Academy of Economic Studies of Moldova

Sergiu Răilean (born 12 April 1976) is a Moldovan politician. He served as Minister of Economy and Infrastructure from 16 March 2020 to 9 November 2020 in the cabinet of Prime Minister Ion Chicu. Anatol Usatîi was appointed as his successor.

Political offices
Preceded by Anatol Usatîi	Minister of Economy and Infrastructure; 2020–2020	Succeeded by Anatol Usatîi
