= Claudiu Năsui =

Romanian politician (born 1985)

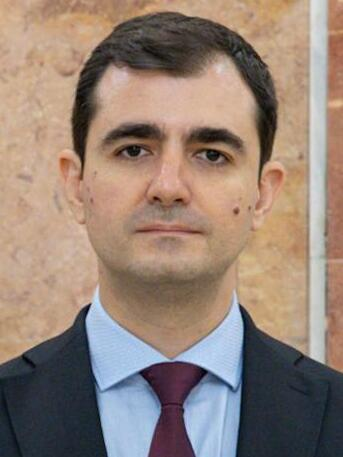
- Năsui in 2026

Minister of Economic Development and Digitalization of Moldova
- Incumbent
- Assumed office 28 August 2026
- President: Maia Sandu
- Prime Minister: Vasile Tofan
- Preceded by: Eugen Osmochescu

Member of the Chamber of Deputies
- In office 20 December 2020 – 21 September 2026
- Constituency: Bucharest

Minister of Economy, Entrepreneurship and Tourism of Romania
- In office 23 December 2020 – 7 September 2021
- President: Klaus Iohannis
- Prime Minister: Florin Cîțu
- Preceded by: Virgil-Daniel Popescu
- Succeeded by: Florin Spătaru

Personal details
- Born: 5 May 1985 (age 41) Bucharest, Romania
- Citizenship: Romania; Moldova
- Party: Save Romania Union (USR)
- Education: Paris Dauphine University; Bocconi University

Claudiu-Iulius-Gavril Năsui (born 5 May 1985) is a Romanian and Moldovan politician, who is currently serving as Minister of Economic Development and Digitalization of Moldova in the Tofan Cabinet.

Born in Bucharest, he completed secondary studies at the Lycée Français Anna de Noailles in his native city. He pursued his undergraduate studies at Paris Dauphine University and obtained an M.A. in finance from Bocconi University in Milan.

A member of the Romanian Chamber of Deputies, Năsui was elected for a Bucharest seat in 2020. From 23 December 2020, he served as the Minister of Economy, Entrepreneurship and Tourism in the Cîțu Cabinet, led by national liberal Prime Minister Florin Cîțu, until his resignation took effect on 7 September 2021. A self-declared admirer of the Argentinian president Javier Milei, his political and economic views have been described as right-libertarian.

In August 2026, Moldovan Prime Minister Vasile Tofan invited Năsui to join his cabinet as Minister of Economy and Digitalization. Having been granted Moldovan citizenship by President Maia Sandu on 25 August the same year, Năsui was sowrn-in as Minister on 28 August.
