= Vadim Brînzan =

Moldovan politician (born 1971)

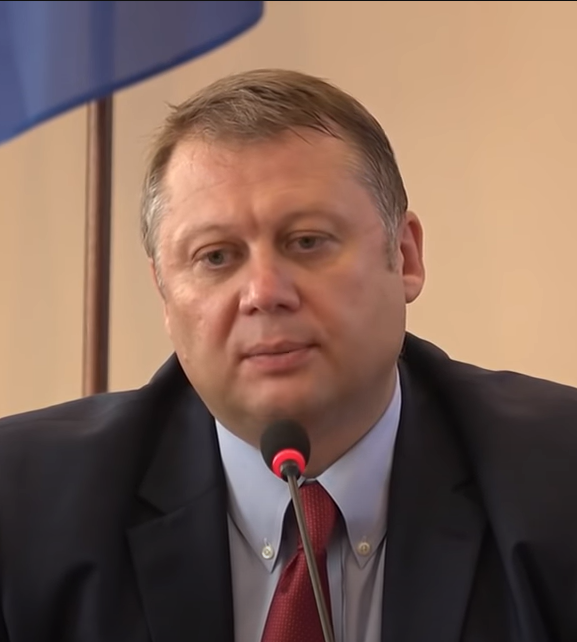
- Brînzan in 2019

Minister of Economy and Infrastructure
- In office 8 June 2019 – 14 November 2019
- President: Igor Dodon
- Prime Minister: Maia Sandu
- Preceded by: Chiril Gaburici
- Succeeded by: Anatol Usatîi

Personal details
- Born: 23 December 1971 (age 54) Olănești, Moldavian SSR, Soviet Union
- Education: Moldova State University; Harvard Business School

Vadim Brînzan (born 23 December 1971) is a former Moldovan politician. He served as Minister of Economy and Infrastructure from 8 June 2019 to 14 November 2019 in the cabinet of Prime Minister Maia Sandu. Anatol Usatîi was appointed as his successor in the cabinet of Prime Minister Ion Chicu.

Political offices
Preceded by Chiril Gaburici	Minister of Economy and Infrastructure; 2019–2019	Succeeded by Anatol Usatîi
