= Sergiu Gaibu =

Moldovan politician (born 1976)

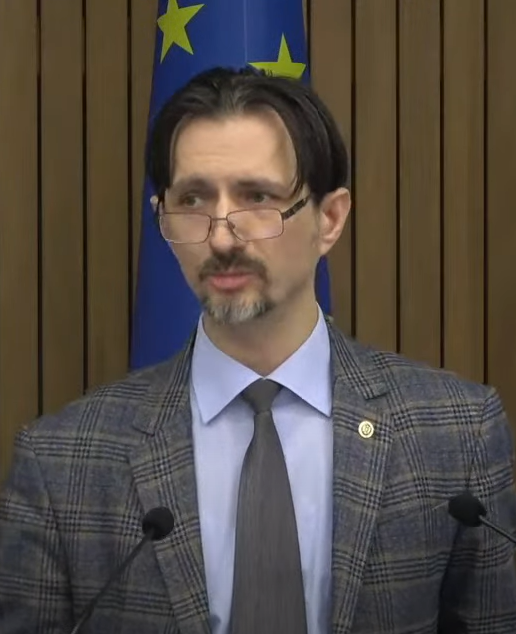
- Gaibu in 2022

Minister of Economy
- In office 6 August 2021 – 16 November 2022
- President: Maia Sandu
- Prime Minister: Natalia Gavrilița
- Preceded by: Anatol Usatîi (as Minister of Economy and Infrastructure)
- Succeeded by: Dumitru Alaiba

Personal details
- Born: 13 May 1976 (age 50) Chișinău, Moldavian SSR, Soviet Union
- Education: Academy of Economic Studies of Moldova

Sergiu Gaibu (born 13 May 1976) is the former Minister of Economy of the Republic of Moldova.
