= Budești, Chișinău =

Budești
- Commune
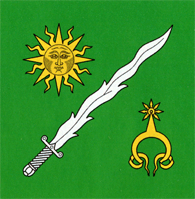
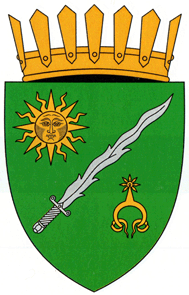
- Flag Coat of arms

- Location in Moldova
- Coordinates: 47°04′N 29°00′E
- Country: Moldova
- Municipalities of Moldova: Chișinău Municipality

Government
  - Mayor: Nina Costiuc (Ind.)

Population (2024)
  - Total: 4,425
- Time zone: UTC+2 (EET)
  - Summer (DST): UTC+3 (EEST)
- Postal code: MD-4814
- Area code: +373 22

Budești was a commune in Chișinău municipality, Moldova. It was composed of two villages, Budești and Văduleni.

== Notable people ==
- Ion Negrei
