= Ștefan Odagiu =

Moldovan engineer, economist and politician (born 1965)

Deputy Prime Minister of Moldova
- In office 14 May 2002 – 2 July 2003 Serving with Dmitri Todoroglo
- President: Vladimir Voronin
- Prime Minister: Vasile Tarlev
- Preceded by: Andrei Cucu
- Succeeded by: Andrei Stratan

Minister of Economy
- In office 14 May 2002 – 2 July 2003
- President: Vladimir Voronin
- Prime Minister: Vasile Tarlev
- Preceded by: Andrei Cucu
- Succeeded by: Marian Lupu

Personal details
- Born: 20 October 1965 (age 60) Moldavian SSR, Soviet Union

Ștefan Odagiu (born 20 October 1965) is a Moldovan engineer, economist and former politician. He served as the Minister of Economy of Moldova from 2002 to 2003.
