= Vitalie Jacot =

Moldovan pro-European politician

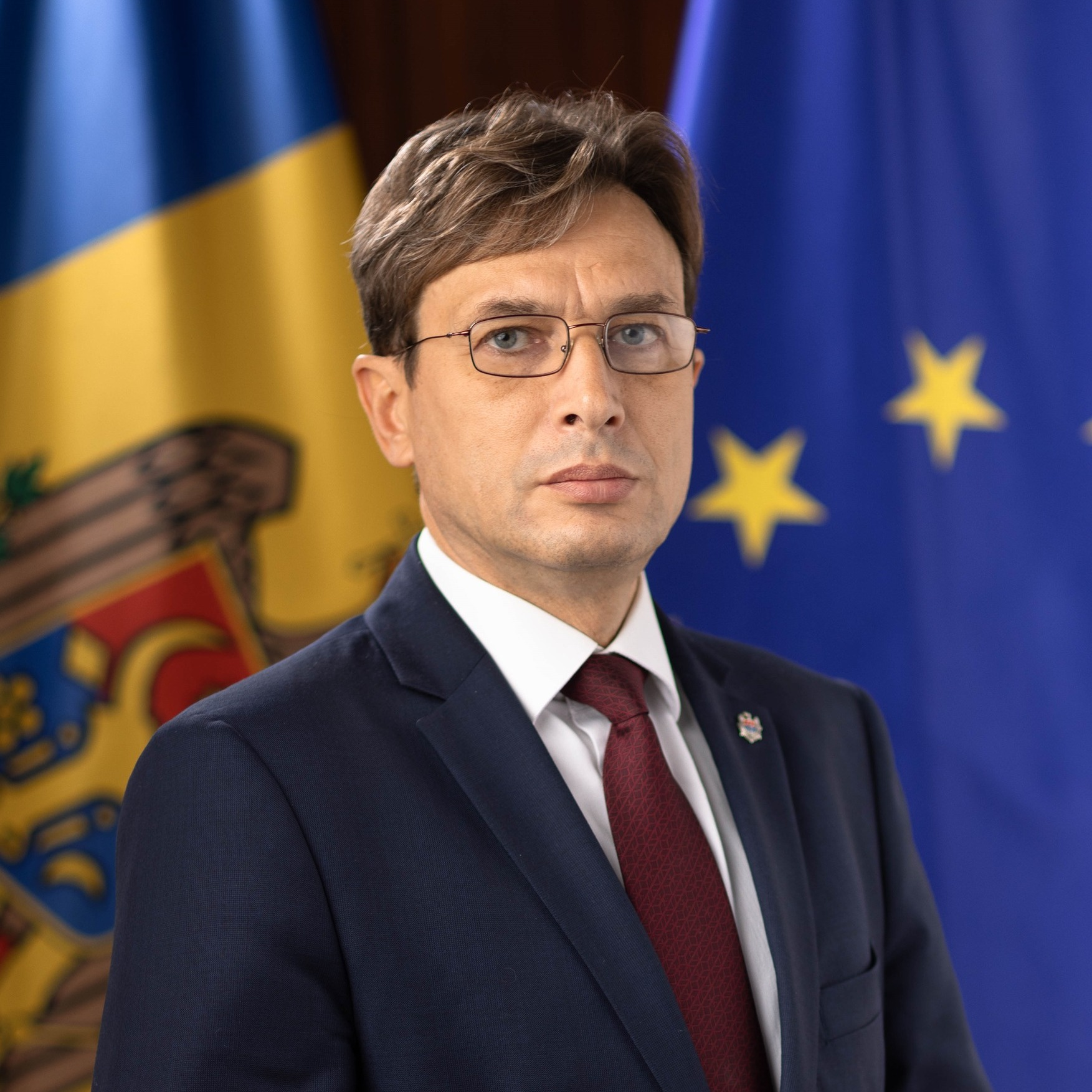
- Official portrait, 2023

Member of the Moldovan Parliament
- In office 23 July 2021 – 16 October 2025
- Parliamentary group: Party of Action and Solidarity

Personal details
- Born: 21 February 1970 (age 56) Chișinău, Moldavian SSR, Soviet Union (now the Republic of Moldova)
- Education: Technical University of Moldova; Moldova State University; Academy of Public Administration

Vitalie Jacot (born 21 February 1970) is a Moldovan pro-European politician and a member of the Party of Action and Solidarity serving as member of the Parliament of the Republic of Moldova from 2021 until 2025 (11th legislature).

== Biography ==
=== Early life and education ===
Vitalie Jacot was born on 21 February 1970, in Chișinău, Moldavian SSR, USSR (now the Republic of Moldova).

Between 1977 and 1987 he studied at the no. 1 "G. I. Kotovski" school in Chișinău (now the "Gheorghe Asachi" Romanian-French High School). From 1987 to 1993 he studied at the Faculty of Electrophysics of the Technical University of Moldova (TUM), obtaining the "systems engineer" qualification. Between 1994 and 1999 Vitalie Jacot studied law at the Moldova State University (MSU) and between 1996 and 1999 he studied international relations, international law, diplomacy and political science at the Faculty of International Relations of the Academy of Public Administration. He speaks Romanian (native language), Russian, French and English.

=== Professional activity ===
While still attending university, Vitalie Jacot worked as a designer at the Prut International Editorial Association between 1991 and 1993. From 1993 to 1995 he was the head of the data processing section at the Exition-Bon Investment Fund. In the period 1995-1999 he was the main specialist in the "Information Technologies" section of the Municipal Heritage Directorate within the Chișinău City Hall, a section that served the entire apparatus of the town hall, all its subdivisions and some town halls in the suburbs of the municipality. Vitalie Jacot carried out an internship within the entities of the Anderlecht City Hall in Belgium through the DELICA project, the TACIS City Twining program between 1996 and 1998. In the periods 1996-1999 and 2001-2003 he was a senior lecturer at the International Free University of Moldova (IFUM), Department of Economics. From 1999 to 2002 he was DTP director at Ogilvy & Mather Chișinău. Between 2002 and 2003 he worked as a project manager at the Foreign Capital Enterprise Celtica Moldova. Also, during this time he worked as a counselor at the Honorary Consulate of the Italian Republic in Chișinău. From 2003 to 2019, Vitalie Jacot was IT executive and person in charge of infrastructure projects at Foreign Capital Enterprise British American Tobacco Moldova Private Limited Company. In the periods 2008-2010 and 2012-2019 he was chairman of the board of directors and administrator of Condominium Co-Owners Association 55/142 (new name: Condominium Owners Association A0110-0172).

Between 2019 and 2021 he was the deputy head of prefecture of Botanica district of the municipality of Chișinău. Vitalie Jacot directed the activity of the Housing and Communal Section and of the Urban Planning and Architecture Section. He was responsible for the organization of current and capital repair works of the residential space and internal engineering networks, the record and exploitation of the housing stock, the development and operation of the building-economic system of the district, the sanitation and development of the territory of the district, the exploitation of green spaces and the evacuation of waste. He was also the president of the Administrative Commission of the prefecture and the vice-president of the Commission for Exceptional Situations of the Botanica district.

Starting from 2021, Vitalie Jacot is a Member of the Parliament of the Republic of Moldova. He is a member of the "Party of Action and Solidarity" faction and of the Committee on Foreign Policy and European Integration, having previously been a member of the Committee for Public Administration and Regional Development - responsible for the urban, housing and communal sector. The politician is the author of the Condominium Law. Also, Vitalie Jacot is the president of the friendship group with the Republic of Azerbaijan, the president of the friendship group with the Kingdom of Morocco, responsible for the friendship group with the Republic of Kazakhstan, responsible for the friendship group with Georgia, member of the Parliamentary Assembly of the Eastern Partnership (EuroNest), member of the Poland-Republic of Moldova Parliamentary Assembly, member of the Parliamentary Assembly of the Francophonie (APF), member of the Parliamentary Dimension of the Central European Initiative (PD CEI) and member of the Inter-Parliamentary Union (IPU).

=== Party activity ===
Vitalie Jacot became a member of the Party of Action and Solidarity (PAS) from the moment of its foundation in 2016. He was active as a member of the local organization Buiucani, after which he transferred to the local organization Botanica. In 2017, he became a member of the Permanent Bureau of the local organization Botanica. In 2019, he applied for the position of vice-president of the Permanent Bureau of the local organization Botanica, being elected to this position. From 2020 to 2021, he provided the interim position of president of the Permanent Bureau of the local organization Botanica. At the November 2021 convention of the territorial organization Chișinău, he submitted his candidacy for the position of vice-president of the territorial organization Chișinău on party building and solving local problems, winning the elections and occupying this position. At the same time, he became an ex officio member of the PAS National Political Bureau.

== Political views ==
Vitalie Jacot advocates the integration of the Republic of Moldova into the European Union. He supports center-right values and ideas.
