= Academy of Public Administration (Moldova) =

Moldovan higher education institution

The Academy of Public Administration under the president of the Republic of Moldova (AAP) (Romanian: Academia de Administrare Publică de pe lângă Președintele Republicii Moldova) was a public higher education institution in Chișinău, the capital of the Republic of Moldova.

== History ==
It was founded by decree No. 73 of the President of Moldova on 21 May 1993, then under the name Academy of Studies in the Field of Public Administration. In the first academic year, 41 full-time students and 97 part-time students were enrolled, and initially, the teaching staff included 11 full-time and 17-part time teachers.

On February 12, 2003, by presidential decree Vladimir Voronin, the institution changed its status, becoming the Academy of Public Administration under the president of the Republic of Moldova. On 14 January 2014, President Nicolae Timofti signed a decree on the reorganisation of the academy of Public Administration into the Academy of Administrative Studies. In that same decree, its returned to the authority and control of the Government of Moldova under the new statute of the institution, which was approved by the government on March 26, 2014. The academy was officially closed in 2022 as part of a major national higher education reform, with its assets being folded under Moldova State University.

== Alumni ==
- Maia Sandu, President of Moldova
- Vitalie Jacot, member of the Parliament of the Republic of Moldova from 2021 until 2025.
