= Deputy Prime Minister of Moldova =

- Viceprim-ministru al Republicii Moldova
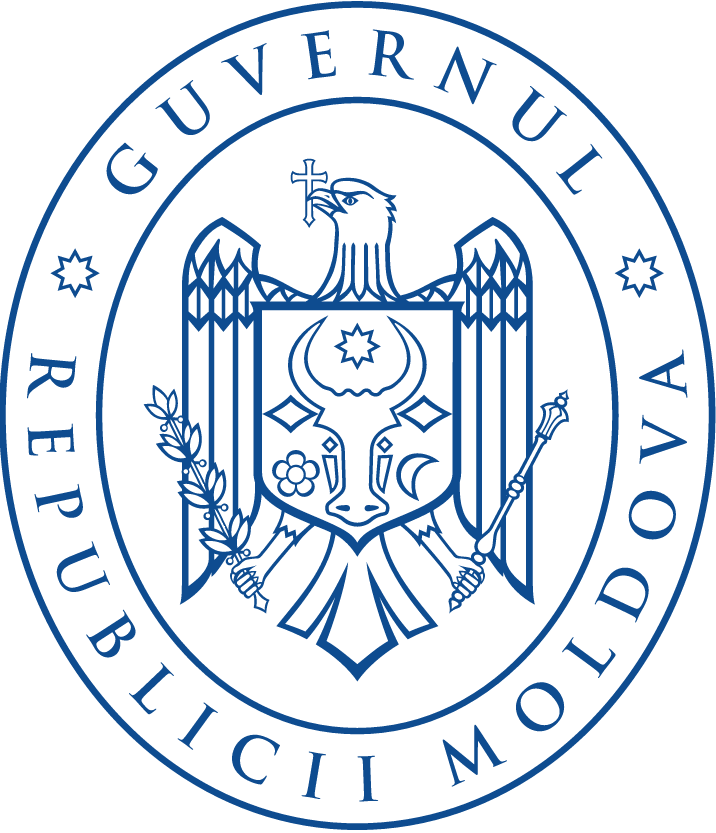
- Incumbent; Mihai Popșoi; Vladimir Bolea; Cristina Gherasimov; Valeriu Chiveri
- Member of: Cabinet of Moldova
- Formation: 27 August 1991; 35 years ago
- First holder: Andrei Sangheli; Ion Ciubuc; Constantin Oboroc

The deputy prime minister of Moldova (Romanian: Viceprim-ministru al Republicii Moldova) is a government post of the Cabinet of Moldova. In the absence of the prime minister of Moldova, a deputy prime minister performs their duties as the acting prime minister.

== List of officeholders ==
=== First deputy prime ministers ===
Portrait	Name (Birth–Death)	Office term		Cabinet
	Andrei Sangheli (born 1944) Minister of Agriculture and Food Industry	6 June 1990	1 July 1992	Druc Muravschi
	Constantin Oboroc (born 1950)	6 June 1990	1 July 1992	Druc Muravschi
	Ion Ciubuc (1943–2018)	28 May 1991	1 July 1992	Muravschi
	Nicolae Andronati (1935–2026)	4 August 1992	5 April 1994	Sangheli I
	Nicolae Andronic (born 1959)	12 March 1999	21 December 1999	Sturza
	Vasile Iovv (1942–2025)	29 January 2002	19 April 2005	Tarlev I
	Zinaida Greceanîi (born 1956)	19 April 2005	31 March 2008	Tarlev II
	Igor Dodon (born 1975) Minister of Economy and Trade	31 March 2008	14 September 2009	Greceanîi I–II

=== Deputy prime ministers ===
Portrait	Name (Birth–Death)	Office term		Cabinet
	Valeriu Cebotari (born 1955)	27 August 1991	1 July 1992	Muravschi
	Gheorghe Efros (born 1948)	27 August 1991	1 July 1992	Muravschi
	Constantin Tampiza (born 1947) Minister of Economy and Finance	27 August 1991	1 July 1992	Muravschi
	Mihai Coșcodan (1940–2016)	4 August 1992	5 April 1994	Sangheli I
	Nicolae Oleinic (1943–2019)	4 August 1992	5 April 1994	Sangheli I
	Valentin Cunev (1946–2023)	4 August 1992	24 January 1997	Sangheli I–II
	Grigore Ojog (born 1954)	16 September 1994	24 January 1997	Sangheli II
	Valeriu Bulgari (born 1956)	5 April 1994	17 June 1996	Sangheli II
	Valeriu Bulgari (born 1956)	24 January 1997	22 May 1998	Ciubuc I
	Ion Guțu (born 1943) Minister of Economy and Reforms	5 April 1994	22 May 1998	Sangheli II Ciubuc I
	Ion Sturza (born 1960) Minister of Economy and Reforms	22 May 1998	12 March 1999	Ciubuc II
	Valentin Dolganiuc (born 1957) Deputy PM for Industrial Policy	22 May 1998	12 March 1999	Ciubuc II
	Nicolae Andronic (born 1959) Deputy PM for Judicial Affairs	22 May 1998	12 March 1999	Ciubuc II
	Oleg Stratulat (born 1957) Deputy PM for Social Policy and Science	22 May 1998	21 December 1999	Ciubuc II Sturza
	Alexandru Muravschi (born 1950) Minister of Economy and Reforms	12 March 1999	21 December 1999	Sturza
	Valeriu Cosarciuc (born 1955)	21 December 1999	19 April 2001	Braghiș
	Lidia Guțu (born 1954)	21 December 1999	19 April 2001	Braghiș
	Eugeniu Șlopac (born 1951) Minister of Economy and Reforms	21 December 1999	6 March 2000	Braghiș
	Andrei Cucu (born 1948) Minister of Economy	6 March 2000	4 February 2002	Braghiș Tarlev I
	Ștefan Odagiu (born 1965) Minister of Economy	14 May 2002	2 July 2003	Tarlev I
	Dmitri Todoroglo (born 1944) Minister of Agriculture and Food Industry	19 April 2001	19 April 2005	Tarlev I
	Valerian Cristea (born 1950)	19 April 2001	15 November 2006	Tarlev I–II
	Andrei Stratan (born 1966) Minister of Foreign Affairs	21 December 2004	25 September 2009	Tarlev I–II Greceanîi I–II
	Vitalie Vrabie (born 1964)	15 November 2006	16 July 2007	Tarlev II
	Victor Stepaniuc (born 1958)	16 January 2008	11 September 2009	Tarlev II Greceanîi I–II
	Valentin Mejinschi (born 1967) Deputy PM for Issues of Corruption, Migration and Human Trafficking	21 October 2008	10 June 2009	Greceanîi I
	Iurie Roșca (born 1961)	10 June 2009	25 September 2009	Greceanîi II
	Ion Negrei (born 1958) Deputy PM for Social Affairs	25 September 2009	14 January 2011	Filat I
	Victor Osipov (born 1971) Deputy PM for Reintegration	25 September 2009	14 January 2011	Filat I
	Victor Osipov (born 1971) Deputy PM for Reintegration	18 February 2015	20 January 2016	Gaburici Streleț
	Iurie Leancă (born 1963) Minister of Foreign Affairs and European Integration; Acting Prime Minister (2013) Deputy PM for European Integration	25 September 2009	31 May 2013	Filat I–II
	Iurie Leancă (born 1963) Minister of Foreign Affairs and European Integration; Acting Prime Minister (2013) Deputy PM for European Integration	10 January 2018	8 June 2019	Filip
	Valeriu Lazăr (born 1968) Minister of Economy	25 September 2009	2 July 2014	Filat I–II Leancă
	Mihai Moldovanu (born 1965) Deputy PM for Social Affairs	14 January 2011	31 May 2013	Filat II
	Eugen Carpov (born 1966) Deputy PM for Reintegration	14 January 2011	18 February 2015	Filat II Leancă
	Tatiana Potîng (born 1971) Deputy PM for Social Affairs	31 May 2013	18 February 2015	Leancă
	Andrian Candu (born 1975) Minister of Economy	3 July 2014	23 January 2015	Leancă
	Natalia Gherman (born 1969) Minister of Foreign Affairs and European Integration Acting Prime Minister (2015)	31 May 2013	20 January 2016	Leancă Gaburici Streleț
	Stéphane Christophe Bridé (born 1971) Minister of Economy	18 February 2015	20 January 2016	Gaburici Streleț
	Gheorghe Brega (born 1951) Deputy PM for Social Affairs Acting Prime Minister (2015–2016)	30 July 2015	30 May 2017	Streleț Filip
	Gheorghe Bălan (born 1975) Deputy PM for Reintegration	20 January 2016	21 December 2017	Filip
	Cristina Lesnic (born 1982) Deputy PM for Reintegration	10 January 2018	8 June 2019	Filip
	Cristina Lesnic (born 1982) Deputy PM for Reintegration	16 March 2020	9 November 2020	Chicu
	Octavian Calmîc (born 1974) Minister of Economy	20 January 2016	21 December 2017	Filip
	Andrei Galbur (born 1975) Minister of Foreign Affairs and European Integration	20 January 2016	21 December 2017	Filip
	Andrei Năstase (born 1975) Minister of Internal Affairs	8 June 2019	14 November 2019	Sandu
	Vasilii Șova (born 1959) Deputy PM for Reintegration	8 June 2019	14 November 2019	Sandu
	Alexandru Flenchea (born 1979) Deputy PM for Reintegration	14 November 2019	16 March 2020	Chicu
	Sergiu Pușcuța (born 1972) Minister of Finance	14 November 2019	31 December 2020	Chicu
	Olga Cebotari (born 1992) Deputy PM for Reintegration	9 November 2020	6 August 2021	Chicu
	Vladislav Kulminski (born 1972) Deputy PM for Reintegration	6 August 2021	5 November 2021	Gavrilița
	Andrei Spînu (born 1986) Minister of Infrastructure and Regional Development	6 August 2021	16 February 2023	Gavrilița
	Iurie Țurcanu (born 1973) Deputy PM for Digitalization	6 August 2021	16 February 2023	Gavrilița
	Nicu Popescu (born 1981) Minister of Foreign Affairs and European Integration	6 August 2021	26 January 2024	Gavrilița Recean
	Oleg Serebrian (born 1969) Deputy PM for Reintegration	19 January 2022	30 June 2025	Gavrilița Recean
	Dumitru Alaiba (born 1982) Minister of Economic Development and Digitalization	16 February 2023	14 March 2025	Recean
	Doina Nistor (born 1977) Minister of Economic Development and Digitalization	14 March 2025	1 November 2025	Recean
	Roman Roșca (born 1982) Deputy PM for Reintegration	23 July 2025	1 November 2025	Recean
	Vladimir Bolea (born 1971) Minister of Agriculture and Food Industry Minister of Infrastructure and Regional Development	16 February 2023	Incumbent	Recean Munteanu Tofan
	Mihai Popșoi (born 1987) Minister of Foreign Affairs	29 January 2024	Incumbent	Recean Munteanu Tofan
	Cristina Gherasimov (born 1984) Deputy PM for European Integration	5 February 2024	Incumbent	Recean Munteanu Tofan
	Valeriu Chiveri (born 1963) Deputy PM for Reintegration	1 November 2025	28 August 2026	Munteanu Tofan
	Eugen Osmochescu (born 1972) Minister of Economic Development and Digitalization Acting Prime Minister (2026)	1 November 2025	28 August 2026	Munteanu Tofan
