= Coșereni =

- Commune
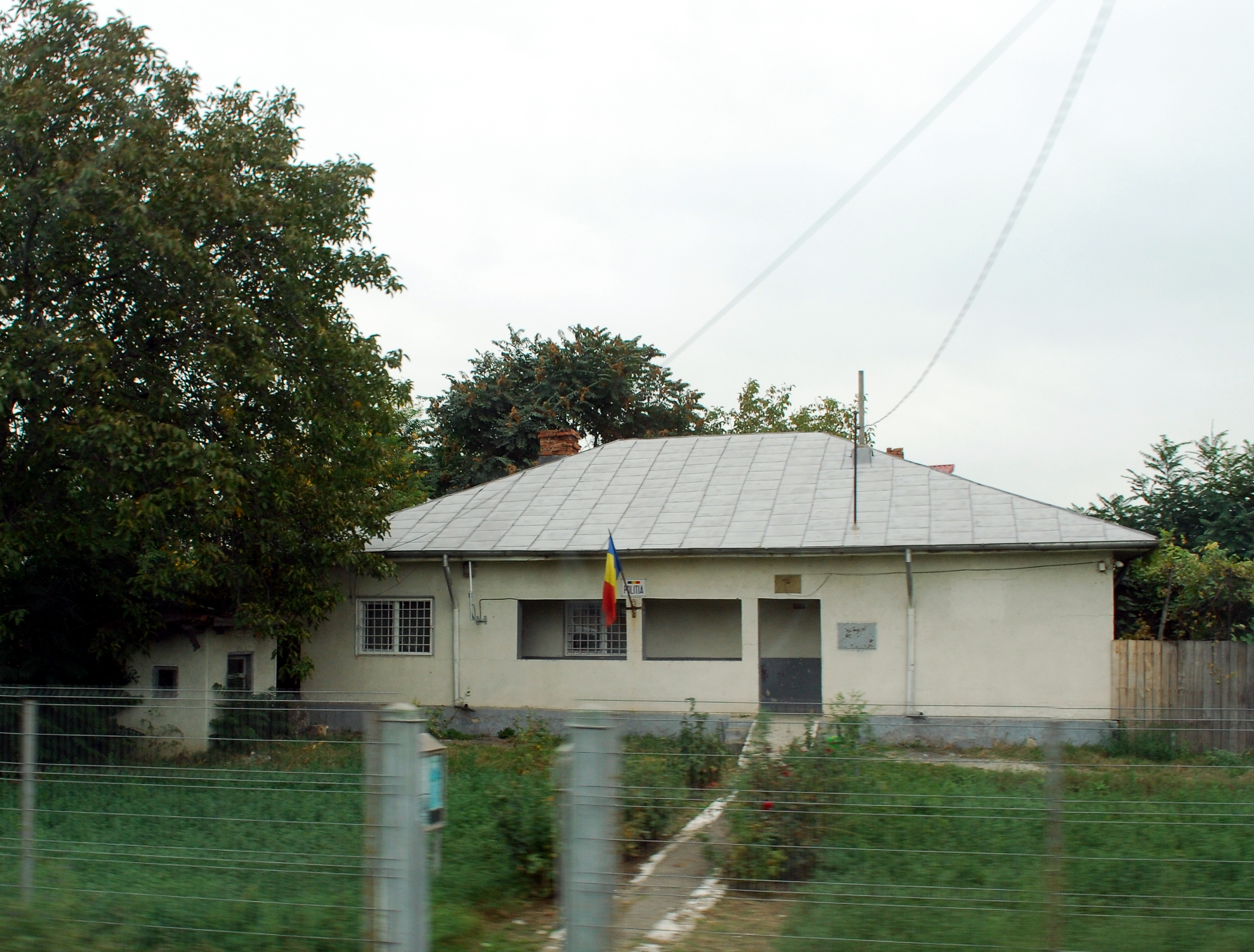
- Police station in Coșereni

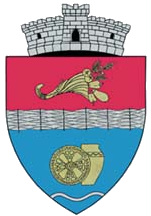
- Coat of arms

- Location in Ialomița County

- Location in Romania
- Coordinates: 44°40′N 26°33′E
- Country: Romania
- County: Ialomița

Government
  - Mayor (2024–2028): Adrian Nae (PSD)
- Area: 34.37 km^{2} (13.27 sq mi)
- Elevation: 57 m (187 ft)
- Population (2021-12-01): 4,195
  - Density: 122.1/km^{2} (316.1/sq mi)
- Time zone: UTC+02:00 (EET)
  - Summer (DST): UTC+03:00 (EEST)
- Postal code: 927095
- Area code: +(40) 243
- Vehicle reg.: IL
- Website: www.primariacosereni.ro

Coșereni is a commune located in Ialomița County, Muntenia, Romania, about 50 km (31 mi) to the northeast of Bucharest. It is composed of a single village, Coșereni.

== Geography ==
The commune is situated in the Wallachian Plain, on the right bank of the Ialomița River. It is located in the western part of Ialomița County, 8 km (5.0 mi) southwest of Urziceni and 70 km (43 mi) west of the county seat, Slobozia.

Coșereni is crossed by national road DN2 (part of European route E85 on this stretch), a road which links Bucharest with the historical regions of Moldavia and Bukovina in northeastern Romania. County road DJ201 branches off in Coșereni, going west towards Slobozia and Țăndărei.

== History ==
On October 30, 1992, the singers Doina and Ion Aldea Teodorovici died following a road accident in Coșereni. A monument was erected where the accident took place.

Historical population
Year	Pop.	±%
1899	1,551	—
1925	2,346	+51.3%
2002	4,671	+99.1%
2011	4,570	−2.2%
2021	4,195	−8.2%
Source: Census data

== Natives ==
- Nicolae Condeescu (1876 – 1936), general
- Marian Neacșu (born 1964), politician and former convict
