= Lycée Français Anna de Noailles =

International school in Bucharest, Romania

Coordinates: 44.5216°N 26.0769°E

- Romanian: Liceul Francez Anna de Noailles

Information
- Established: 1960
- Age: 3 to 18
- Language: French; Romanian

Lycée Français Anna de Noailles (Romanian: Liceul Francez Anna de Noailles) is a French international school located at 160A București-Ploiești Road, Sector 1, Bucharest, Romania. Named after Anna de Noailles, the French writer of Romanian descent, it serves levels maternelle (preschool) through lycée (senior high school).

== History ==
The first French school in Romania opened in 1920 and was closed in 1949. The first "Lycée français de Bucarest" opened in 1940 and closed in 1949 due to actions from the Romanian communist authorities. A new French school for children of diplomats was permitted to open in 1956. The current French school, an embassy school that was originally the École Française de Bucarest, opened in 1960. It received its current name in 1998.

Construction of the current school began in January 2012 and was completed in 2013.

== Student body ==
As of 2013, 39% of the students were Romanians. There are 23 different nationalities in the school as of 2024.

== Alumni ==
- Claudiu Năsui

== See also ==
- France–Romania relations
