= Valentin Dolganiuc =

Moldovan politician (born 1957)

Valentin Dolganiuc OR
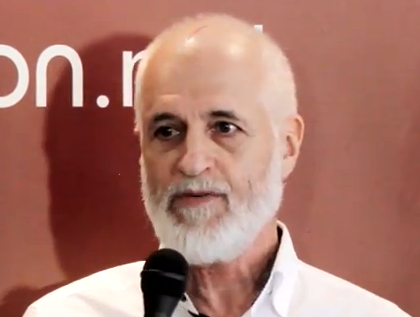
- Dolganiuc in 2015

Deputy Prime Minister of Moldova for Industrial Policy
- In office 22 May 1998 – 12 March 1999
- President: Petru Lucinschi
- Prime Minister: Ion Ciubuc

Member of the Moldovan Parliament
- In office 17 April 1990 – 22 May 1998
- Parliamentary group: Popular Front; Christian-Democratic People's Party
- Constituency: Edineț

Personal details
- Born: 12 March 1957 (age 69) Zăbriceni, Moldavian SSR, Soviet Union
- Party: Popular Front of Moldova

Valentin Dolganiuc (born 12 March 1957) is a Moldovan politician.

== Biography ==
He served as member of the Parliament of Moldova.

At present, he is a political analyst.
