= Alexandru Codreanu =

Moldovan diplomat (born 1965)

Moldovan Ambassador to the Czech Republic and the Holy See
- In office 1 July 2020 – 30 July 2024
- President: Igor Dodon; Maia Sandu
- Prime Minister: Ion Chicu; Aureliu Ciocoi (acting); Natalia Gavrilița; Dorin Recean
- Preceded by: Vitalie Rusu
- Succeeded by: Gabriela Moraru

Moldovan Ambassador to Hungary, Bosnia and Herzegovina, Croatia and Slovenia
- In office 16 August 2010 – 20 December 2013
- President: Mihai Ghimpu (acting); Vladimir Filat (acting); Marian Lupu (acting); Nicolae Timofti
- Prime Minister: Vladimir Filat; Iurie Leancă
- Preceded by: Valeriu Bobuțac
- Succeeded by: Oleg Țulea

Personal details
- Children: 1 son
- Education: Universitatea de Stat din Moldova (Chișinău), Școala Națională de Studii Politice și Administrative (București)
- Profession: Diplomat

Alexandru Codreanu (born 1 September 1965) is a diplomat from the Republic of Moldova. He is the Ambassador of the Republic of Moldova to the Czech Republic and Ambassador of the Republic of Moldova to the Holy See.
