= Eugeniu Șlopac =

Moldovan economist

Deputy Prime Minister of Moldova
- In office 21 December 1999 – 6 March 2000
- President: Petru Lucinschi
- Prime Minister: Dumitru Braghiș
- Preceded by: Alexandru Muravschi
- Succeeded by: Andrei Cucu

Minister of Economy and Reforms
- In office 21 December 1999 – 6 March 2000
- President: Petru Lucinschi
- Prime Minister: Dumitru Braghiș
- Preceded by: Alexandru Muravschi
- Succeeded by: Andrei Cucu (as Minister of Economy)

Personal details
- Born: 28 December 1951 (age 74) Mălăiești, Moldavian SSR, Soviet Union

Eugeniu Șlopac (born 28 December 1951) is a Moldovan economist. He served as the Minister of Economy and Reforms of Moldova from 1999 to 2000.
