= Petru Frunze =

Moldovan politician (born 1985)

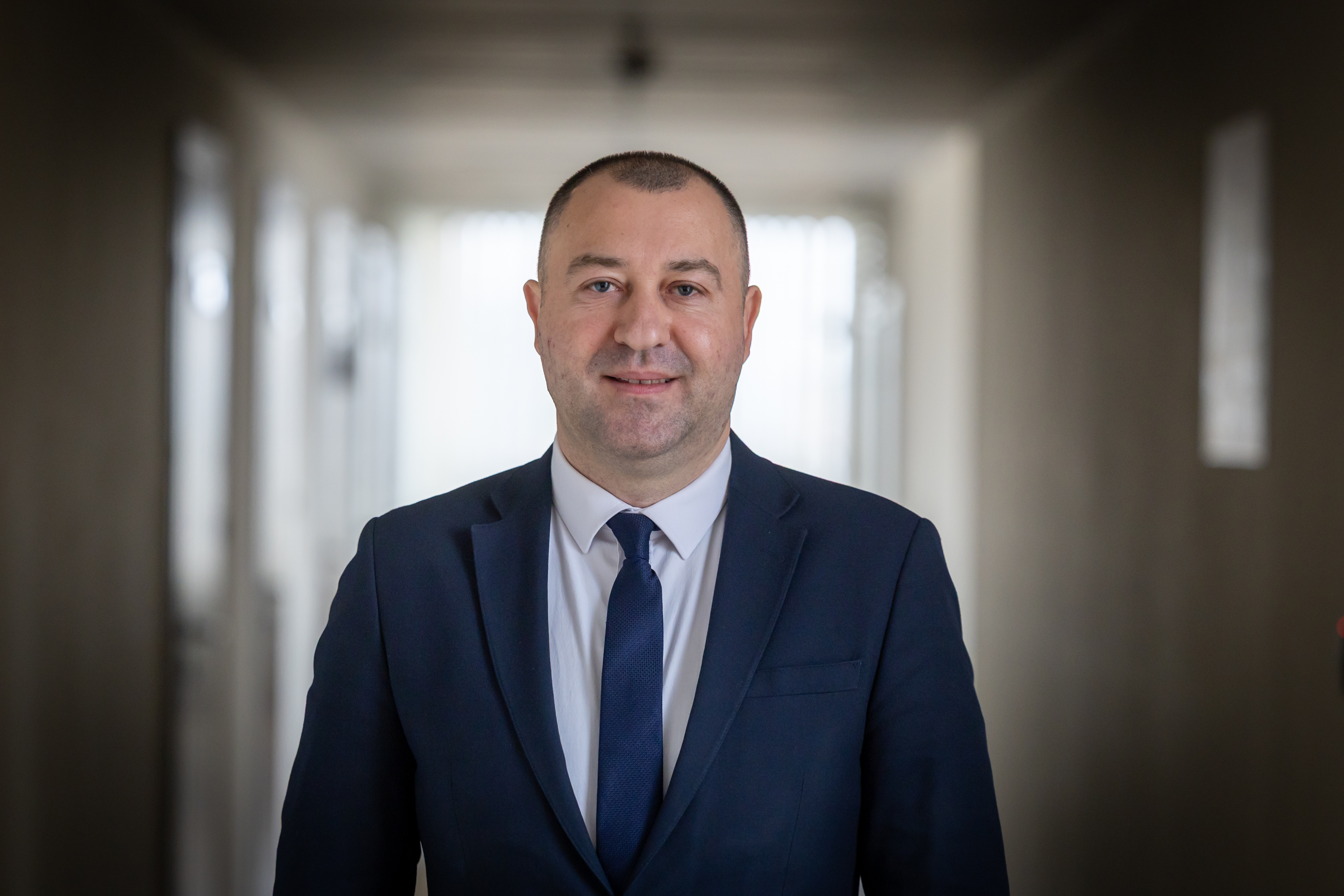
- Frunze in 2025

Moldovan Ambassador to China
- Incumbent
- Assumed office 2 February 2026
- President: Maia Sandu
- Prime Minister: Alexandru Munteanu; Eugen Osmochescu (acting); Vasile Tofan
- Preceded by: Dumitru Braghiș

Member of the Moldovan Parliament
- In office 9 March 2019 – 16 October 2025
- Parliamentary group: Party of Action and Solidarity
- Constituency: Răzeni
- Majority: 12,807 (44.9%)

Mayor of Puhoi
- In office 5 June 2011 – 9 March 2019
- Succeeded by: Ioan Goreanu

Personal details
- Born: 5 January 1985 (age 41) Dănceni, Moldavian SSR, Soviet Union
- Education: Free International University of Moldova

Petru Frunze (born 5 January 1985) is a Moldovan lawyer and politician. He served as a Member of the Moldovan Parliament from 2019 until 2025.
