= Grigore Cazacliu =

Romanian politician (1892–1959)

Member of Sfatul Țării
- In office 1917–1918

Personal details
- Born: 20 January 1892 Cușelăuca, Soroksky Uyezd, Bessarabia Governorate
- Died: 27 December 1959 (aged 67) Bucharest, Romanian People's Republic
- Relations: Ion Cazacliu (uncle); Vladimir Cazacliu (brother)

Grigore Cazacliu (January 25, 1892 – December 27, 1959) was a Romanian politician from Bessarabia, and a member of Sfatul Țării.

== Biography ==
He was born in Cușelăuca, Soroksky Uyezd, Bessarabia Governorate. Cazacliu served as Member of the Sfatul Țării (the Parliament of Bessarabia) in 1917–1918, a student at the time. The Cazacliu family played an important role in the Great Union; Ion Cazacliu was Grigore's uncle, and Vladimir Cazacliu was his brother. Vladimir and Grigore Cazacliu were the sons of Alexandru and Evdochia Cazacliu; they also had a brother, Ioan, and a sister, Ludmila.

Grigore Cazacliu died in Bucharest, at age 67.

== Gallery ==
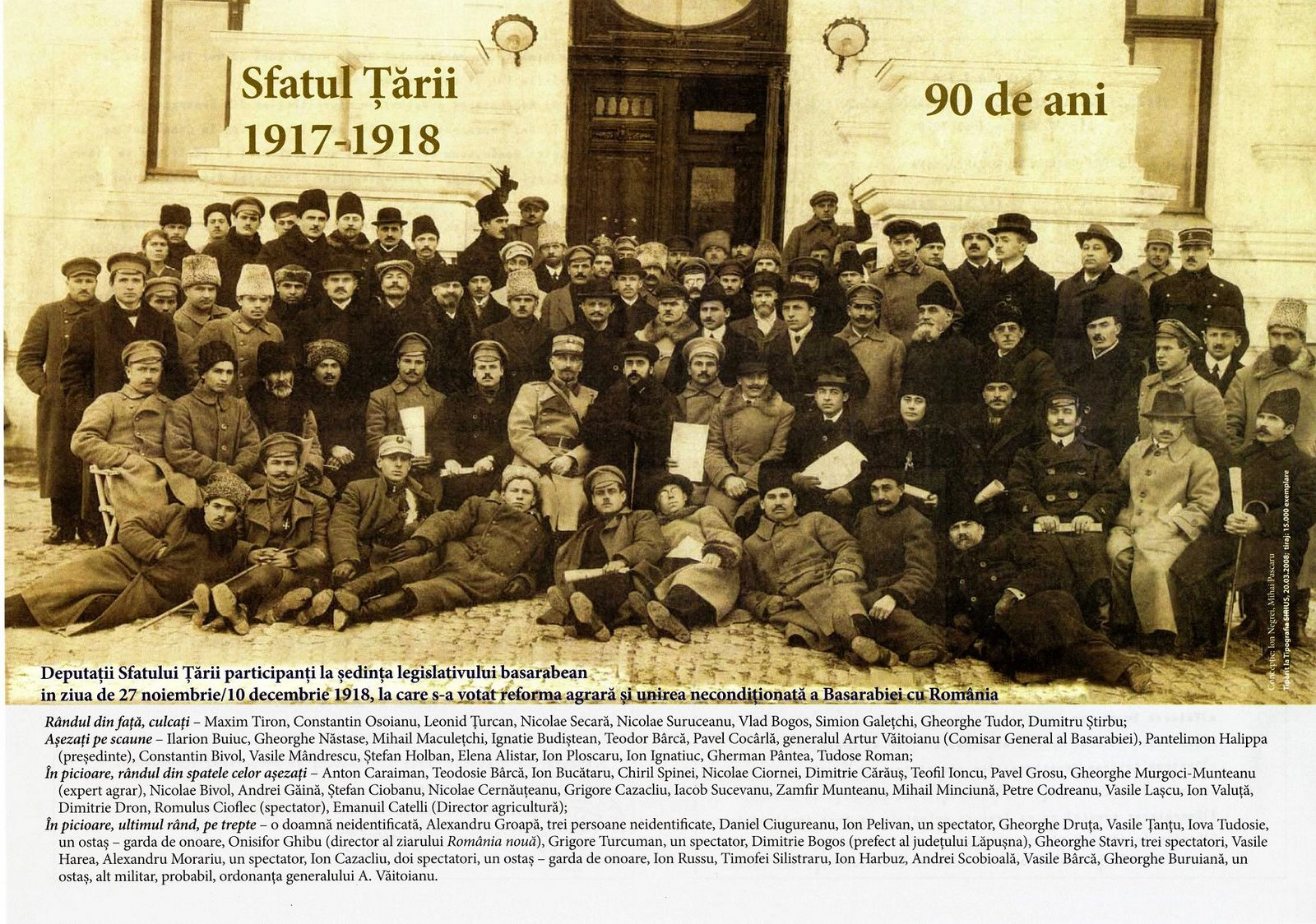
Sfatul Țării, December 10, 1918; Grigore Cazacliu is in the middle, standing behind the seated row

Moldovan stamp, 1998
