= Gheorghe Lungu (politician) =

Moldovan politician (born 1949)

Minister of Agriculture and Food Industry
- In office 24 January 1997 – 22 May 1998
- President: Petru Lucinschi
- Prime Minister: Ion Ciubuc
- Preceded by: Vitalie Gorincioi
- Succeeded by: Valeriu Bulgari (as Minister of Agriculture and Manufacturing Industry)

Member of the Moldovan Parliament
- In office 29 March 1994 – 24 January 1997
- Succeeded by: Ion Bulgac
- Parliamentary group: Democratic Agrarian Party

Personal details
- Born: July 31, 1949 (age 76) Recea, Moldavian SSR, Soviet Union

Gheorghe Lungu (born 31 July 1949) is a Moldovan politician who served as the Minister of Agriculture of Moldova from 1997 to 1998.
