= Vladimir Cazacliu =

Bessarabian politician (1887–1950)

Member of the Moldovan Parliament
- In office 1917–1918

Personal details
- Born: 1890 Cuşelăuca
- Died: 1950 (aged 59–60) Bucharest
- Relations: Ion Cazacliu (uncle); Grigore Cazacliu (brother)

Vladimir Cazacliu (born 1887, Cuşelăuca - died 1950, Bucharest) student, was a Bessarabian politician, member of the Sfatului Țării.

== Biography ==
He served as Member of the Moldovan Parliament (1917–1918). On 27 March 1918, Vladimir Cazacliu (as Ion and Grigore) voted the Union of Bessarabia with Romania. The Cazacliu family played an important role in the Great Union; Ion Cazacliu was Vladimir's uncle, and Grigore Cazacliu was his brother.

== Gallery ==
Moldovan stamp, 1998
