= Mihai Moldovanu =

Moldovan politician (born 1965)

Deputy Prime Minister of Moldova for Social Affairs
- In office 14 January 2011 – 16 May 2013
- President: Marian Lupu (acting); Nicolae Timofti
- Prime Minister: Vladimir Filat
- Preceded by: Ion Negrei
- Succeeded by: Tatiana Potîng

Member of the Moldovan Parliament
- In office 22 April 2009 – 16 July 2010
- Succeeded by: Ștefan Urâtu
- Parliamentary group: Liberal Party

Personal details
- Born: 7 June 1965 (age 60) Ordășei, Moldavian SSR, Soviet Union
- Party: Liberal Party (Moldova); Alliance for European Integration
- Profession: Doctor

Mihai Moldovanu (born 7 June 1965) is a Moldovan politician. Since May 2009 to 2010 he was member of Parliament of Moldova. From 14 January 2011 to 16 May 2013 he was Deputy Prime Minister of Moldova.

== Biography ==
Mihai Moldovanu was born on 7 June 1965 in the village of Ordășei, in the region of Telenești of the Republic of Moldova. In 1984 he graduated from College of Medicine of Orhei. In 1992 he graduated from State University of Medicine and Pharmacheuticals «Nicolae Testemițanu» (Moldova).

- Since 1993 to 2007 he worked as in Hospital-Sanatorium of recovering of Government of Moldova
- Since 2007 to 2009 he was the director at Health Direction of Chișinău Municipal Consilium
- Since 2009 to 2010 he was deputy in Parliament of Moldova
- Since 2010 to 2011, he was again director at Health Direction of Chișinău Municipal Consilium
- From 14 January 2011 to 16 May 2013 he worked as Deputy Prime Minister of Moldova.
