= Free International University of Moldova =

Private university in Chișinău, Moldova

Coordinates: 47.02308°N 28.83694°E

- Universitatea Liberă Internațională din Moldova
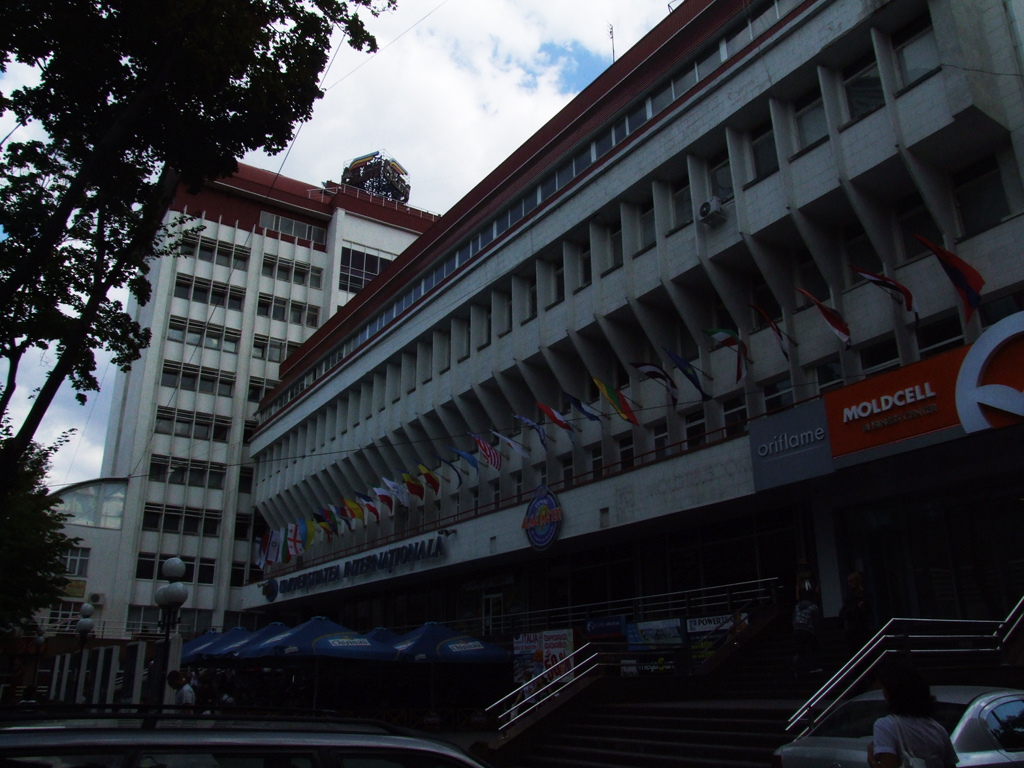
- Motto: Non Scholae, Sed Vitae Discimus (English: "We do not learn for school, but for life")
- Established: October 16, 1992
- Affiliations: Magna Charta Universitatum
- Rector: Ilian Galben
- Location: Chisinau, Moldova
- Website: ulim.md

The Free International University of Moldova (ULIM) is a private higher education institution in Chișinău, Moldova. The university offers undergraduate, master's, and doctoral degree programs. The ULIM was founded on October 16, 1992 by a decision of the Government of Moldova. The university is accredited by the National Council for Accreditation and Attestation of the Republic of Moldova. ULIM has academic infrastructure such as libraries, computer rooms, a sports center and a university campus.

== Faculties ==
- Faculty of Law
- Faculty of Economic Sciences
- Faculty of Social Sciences and Education
- Faculty of Computer Science, Engineering and Design
- Faculty of International Relations, Foreign Languages and Journalism

== Notable alumni ==
- Vitalie Jacot, member of parliament from 2021 until 2025.
- Petru Frunze, Moldovan Ambassador to the People's Republic of China since 2026.

== See also ==
- List of universities in Moldova
