= Ion Negrei =

Moldovan politician (born 1958)

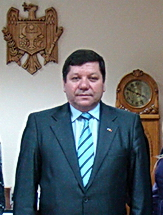
- Negrei in 2009

Deputy Prime Minister of Moldova for Social Affairs
- In office 25 September 2009 – 14 January 2011
- President: Mihai Ghimpu (acting); Vlad Filat (acting); Marian Lupu (acting)
- Prime Minister: Vlad Filat
- Succeeded by: Mihai Moldovanu

Personal details
- Born: March 12, 1958 (age 68) Budești, Moldavian SSR, Soviet Union
- Party: Liberal Party (Moldova) (2009–present); Alliance for European Integration (2009–present)
- Spouse: Viorica Negrei
- Children: 1
- Profession: Historian

Ion Negrei (born 12 March 1958) is a Moldovan politician.

== Career ==
He was the Deputy Prime Minister in charge of social issues in First Vlad Filat Cabinet. He was replaced by Mihai Moldovanu in the Second Filat Cabinet. Negrei became head of the Movement to Celebrate the 1812 annexation of Bessarabia to the Russian Empire.

He is a member of the Liberal Party.
