= List of ambassadors of Moldova to China =

Ambassador of Moldova to the People's Republic of China
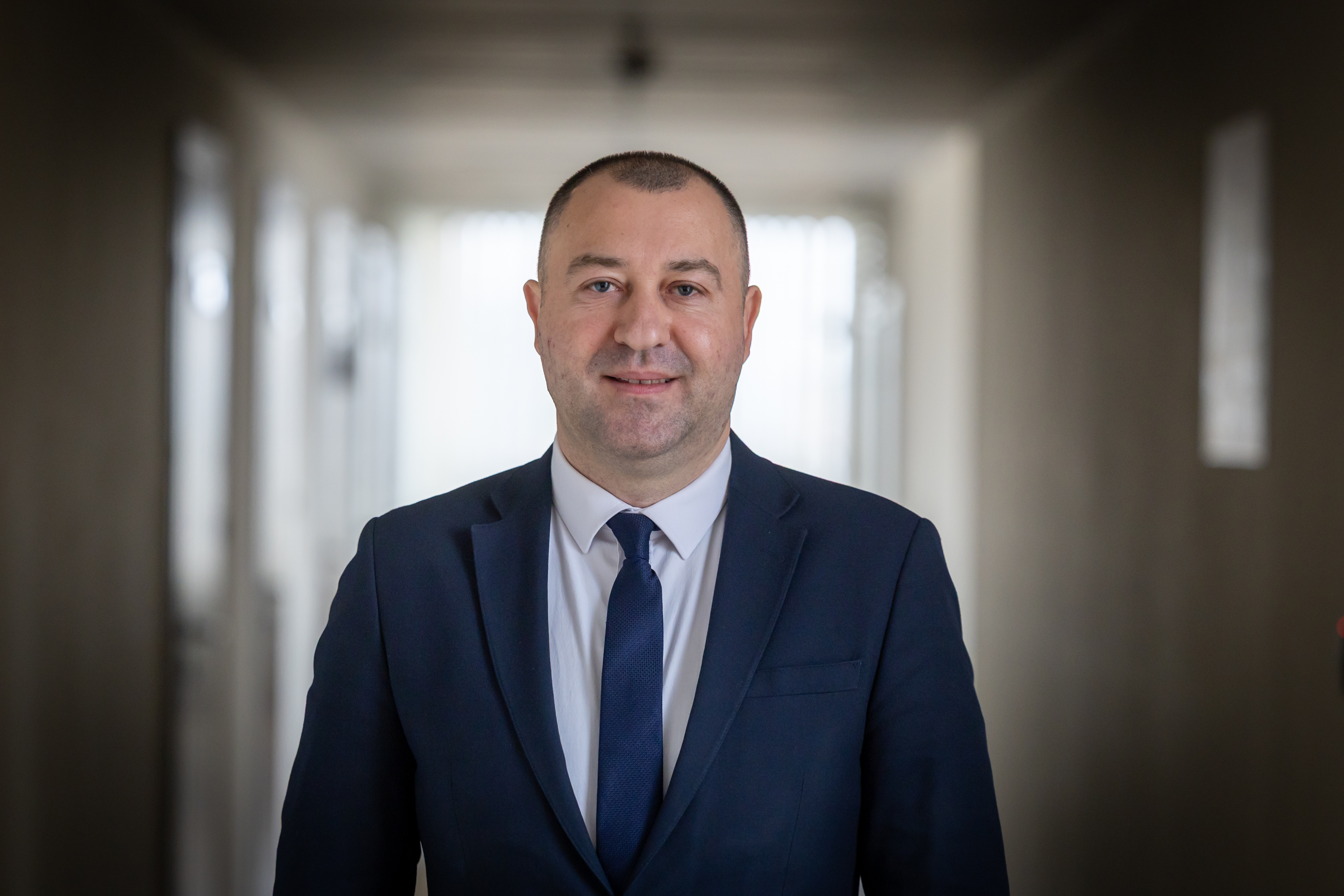
- Incumbent; Petru Frunze since 2 February 2026
- Inaugural holder: Vasilii Șova
- Formation: August 27, 1998

The Moldovan ambassador in Beijing is the official representative of the Government in Chișinău to the Government of the People's Republic of China.

== Ambassadors ==
- 1998–2002: Vasilii Șova
- 2002–2006: Victor Borșevici
- 2006–2009: Iacov Timciuc
- 2010–2015: Anatolie Urecheanu
- 2015–2017: Aureliu Ciocoi
- 2018–2020: Denis Jelimalai
- 2020–2025: Dumitru Braghiș
- 2026–present: Petru Frunze
