= Andrei Cucu =

Moldovan politician

Deputy Prime Minister of Moldova
- In office 15 March 2000 – 4 February 2002 Serving with Dmitri Todoroglo
- President: Petru Lucinschi; Vladimir Voronin
- Prime Minister: Dumitru Braghiș; Vasile Tarlev
- Preceded by: Eugeniu Șlopac
- Succeeded by: Ștefan Odagiu

Minister of Economy
- In office 15 March 2000 – 4 February 2002
- President: Petru Lucinschi; Vladimir Voronin
- Prime Minister: Dumitru Braghiș; Vasile Tarlev
- Preceded by: Eugeniu Șlopac (as Minister of Economy and Reforms)
- Succeeded by: Ștefan Odagiu

Personal details
- Born: 31 August 1948 (age 77) Hulboaca, Moldavian SSR, Soviet Union

Andrei Cucu (born 31 August 1948) is a Moldovan economist who served as the Minister of Economy of Moldova from 2000 to 2002.
