= Năpădeni =

- Village
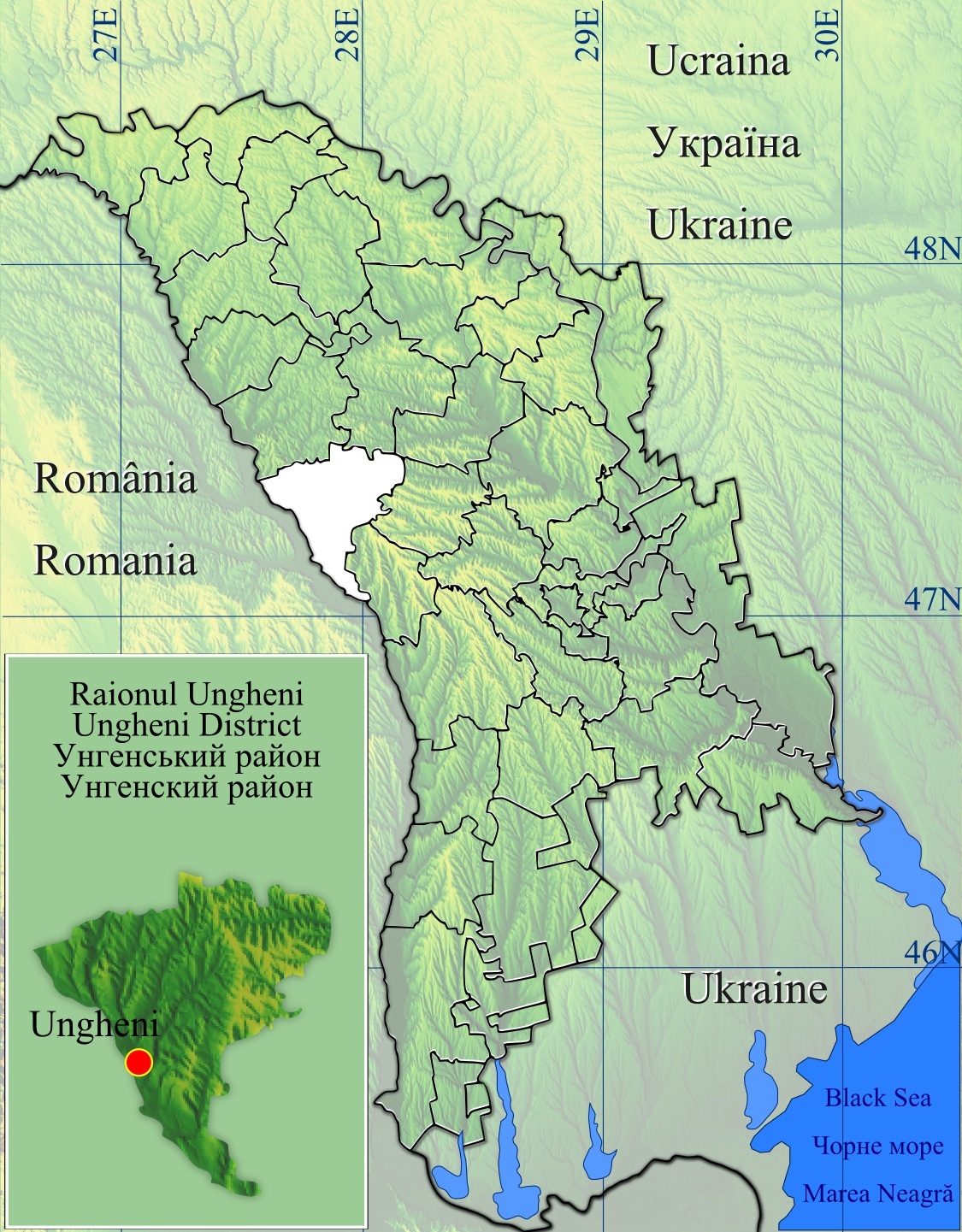
- Location within Ungheni
- Coordinates: 47°24′11″N 28°8′59″E
- Country: Moldova

Government
  - Mayor: Maria Arteomov (PL)

Population (2014 census)
  - Total: 861
- Time zone: UTC+2 (EET)
  - Summer (DST): UTC+3 (EEST)
- Postal code: MD-3638

Năpădeni is a village in Ungheni District, Moldova.

== Notable people ==
- Mihai Coscodan (1940–2016), professor, a member of the first Parliament of the Republic of Moldova 1990-1994 (Moldovan parliamentary election, 1990) and it is one of the signers of Declaration of Independence, the Government, in diplomatic mission
