= Valeriu Bulgari =

Moldovan politician

Valeriu Bulgari OR

Minister of Agriculture and Manufacturing Industry
- In office 22 May 1998 – 21 December 1999
- President: Petru Lucinschi
- Prime Minister: Ion Ciubuc; Ion Sturza
- Preceded by: Gheorghe Lungu (as Minister of Agriculture and Food Industry)
- Succeeded by: Ion Russu

Deputy Prime Minister of Moldova
- In office 5 April 1994 – 22 May 1998
- President: Mircea Snegur; Petru Lucinschi
- Prime Minister: Andrei Sangheli; Ion Ciubuc

Member of the Moldovan Parliament
- In office 17 April 1990 – 5 April 1994
- Succeeded by: Ion Popov
- Parliamentary group: Democratic Agrarian Party
- Constituency: Briceni

Personal details
- Born: 29 November 1956 (age 69) Larga, Moldavian SSR, Soviet Union

Valeriu Bulgari (born 29 November 1956) is a Moldovan politician who held the office of Deputy Prime Minister as well as Minister of Agriculture of Moldova in the late 1990s.
