= Grigorăuca =

- Commune
- Location within Moldova
- Coordinates: 47.6188888889°N 28.1958333333°E
- Country: Moldova
- District: Sîngerei District

Population (2014)
  - Total: 2,374
- Time zone: UTC+2 (EET)
  - Summer (DST): UTC+3 (EEST)

Grigorăuca is a commune in Sîngerei District, Moldova. It is composed of three villages: Cozești, Grigorăuca and Petropavlovca.
