= Alexandr Muravschi =

Moldovan politician (born 1950)

Alexandr Muravschi OR
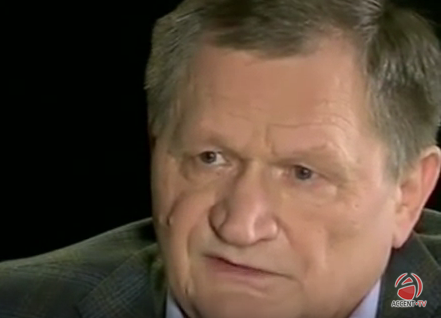
- Muravschi in 2015

Deputy Prime Minister of Moldova
- In office 12 March 1999 – 21 December 1999
- President: Petru Lucinschi
- Prime Minister: Ion Sturza
- Preceded by: Ion Sturza
- Succeeded by: Eugeniu Șlopac

Minister of Economy and Reforms
- In office 12 March 1999 – 21 December 1999
- President: Petru Lucinschi
- Prime Minister: Ion Sturza
- Preceded by: Ion Sturza
- Succeeded by: Eugeniu Șlopac

Member of the Moldovan Parliament
- In office 22 March 1998 – 12 March 1999
- Succeeded by: Valeriu Tabunșcic
- Parliamentary group: For a Democratic and Prosperous Moldova Electoral Bloc

Personal details
- Born: 30 September 1950 (age 75) Chișinău, Moldavian SSR, Soviet Union
- Education: State Agrarian University of Moldova; London School of Economics

Alexandr Muravschi (born 30 September 1950) is a Moldovan economist and politician. He served as Deputy Prime Minister and Minister of Economy and Reforms of Moldova in the Sturza Cabinet.
