= Trebisăuți =

- Village
- Location within Moldova
- Coordinates: 48.3558333333°N 27.1908333333°E
- Country: Moldova
- District: Briceni District

Government
  - Mayor: Grossu Valentin (PSRM)

Population (2014 census)
  - Total: 1,969
- Time zone: UTC+2 (EET)
  - Summer (DST): UTC+3 (EEST)

Trebisăuți is a village in Briceni District, Moldova.
