= Doina and Ion Aldea Teodorovici =

Moldovan musical duo

Doina and Ion Aldea Teodorovici OR
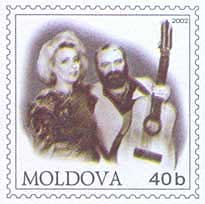
- 2002 stamp of Moldova

Background information
- Origin: Chișinău, Moldova
- Genres: Folk; pop
- Years active: 1981–1992
- Members: Doina Aldea Teodorovici; Ion Aldea Teodorovici
- Awards: Order of the Republic (Moldova)

Doina and Ion Aldea Teodorovici was a Moldovan-Romanian musical duo consisting of married couple Doina and Ion Aldea Teodorovici. The group disbanded in 1992, after both members died in a road traffic accident in Coșereni. Today, there is a monument to them there, as well as another in Chișinău.

== History ==
In 1981, Doina Marin married Ion Aldea-Teodorovici. Their son, Cristofor Aldea-Teodorovici, was born on August 5, 1982. From 1982 onwards, Doina began to explore her talent as a pop music performer, closely collaborating with her husband.

In 1985, they participated in a cultural program, attending a school for young researchers in Vadul lui Vodă alongside the renowned poet Grigore Vieru.

In 1988, she assumed a role as a literature professor, teaching world literature at the Academy of Music, Theater, and Fine Arts in Chișinău. She was also an active vocalist in the band "DIATE." Between 1989 and 1990, Doina and Ion performed in numerous cities and villages in Moldova, as well as in various locations across Romania, including Bucharest, Cluj-Napoca, Brașov, Suceava, Iași, Botoșani, Focșani, and Bârlad.

In 1991, the couple received the press award at the National Pop Music Festival "Mamaia - 91." Additionally, in 1992, Doina Aldea-Teodorovici appeared in the film "Dragostea ce mișcă sori și stele." During the same year, both she and Ion were recognized at the "Cerbul de Aur" Festival in Brașov.

The couple played a significant role in the Moldovan cultural and patriotic landscape, actively participating in events that marked the country's national revival. Her songs, such as Suveranitate, Sfântă ni-i casa, and Mănăstirea Căpriana, carried profound patriotic themes, making them a symbol of Moldova. In May 1992, together with Ion and notable poets like Grigore Vieru and Adrian Păunescu, they performed in front of soldiers during the Transnistria conflict. Later in 1992, they received the title of "Artistă Emerită" (Distinguished Artist) of the Republic of Moldova for her contributions to the nation's cultural heritage.

== Death ==
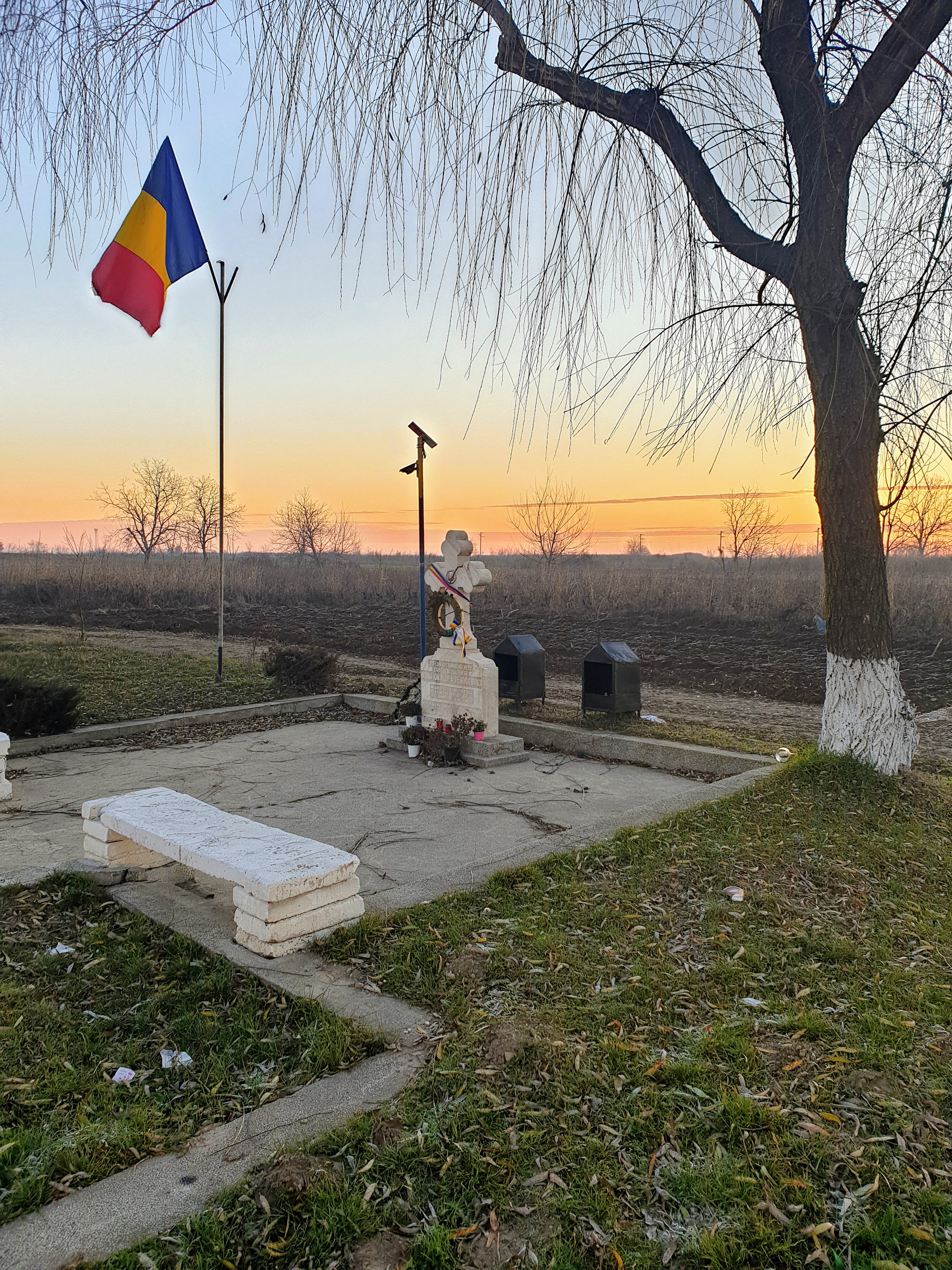
The memorial near Coșereni

Doina and Ion Aldea Teodorovici died together in a road accident on the DN2 highway, near Coșereni on the night of October 29-30, 1992. Doina was pregnant and expecting a baby girl.

The accident occurred at around 02:15 AM involving an Opel car with the license plate 0905 MBC, driven by a 33-year-old Ukrainian citizen named Alexandr Ceakaunov. Both the driver and the fourth passenger, who was in the front seat, Vasilii Koudalb, 38 years old, survived the accident. According to the Romanian press, three injured individuals were extracted from the car with great difficulty. Two other vehicles transported Vasilii Koudalb and Alexandr Chakaunov to the Urziceni Hospital. At 02:30 AM, an ambulance took Doina Aldea-Teodorovici, who was in a coma. The ambulance rushed towards Bucharest at full speed. During the journey, Doina briefly regained consciousness and cried out several times, "Oh, my whole body hurts," and then she died. Ion Aldea-Teodorovici's lifeless body was recovered with great difficulty. The police had to use an oxy-acetylene torch to cut through the wrecked car, finally freeing the body at 7:00 AM.

Ion and Doina Aldea-Teodorovici left behind an orphaned 10-year-old child named Cristofor, who continued his parents' musical legacy. In a tribute to his mother, in 2021, Cristofor named his daughter Doina. The couple is buried at the Chișinău Central Cemetery.

== Legacy ==
In 1993, Doina and Ion Aldea Teodorovici were posthumously awarded the Order of the Republic. In 2003 the Festival – competition Two twin hearts in memoriam Doina and Ion Aldea-Teodorovici was initiated and ran until 2018. A monument in their memory was erected near Coșereni, where the accident took place. In Chișinău a street in the Buiucani sector bears their name.

=== The monument in Chișinău ===
The monument is known as "Requiem for Love," or locally referred to as "Two Twin Hearts." It is situated at the main entrance of "Valea Morilor" Park, Chișinău, in a garden square across from the State University. It was unveiled in 1999, commemorating the 7th anniversary of the passing of the renowned musical duo, singers, composers, and national patriots. The sculptor is Iurie Canașin.

== Members ==
- Doina Aldea Teodorovici – born 15 November 1958 in Chișinău, died 30 October 1992 (aged 33) in Coșereni.
- Ion Aldea Teodorovici – born 7 April 1954 in Leova, died 30 October 1992 (aged 38) in Coșereni. He was a graduate of Moldova State University.

== Awards ==
- Order of the Republic, 1993 – posthumously
- Artist Emerit din R. Moldova - 1992

== Works ==
- "Iona"
- "Disidentul"
- "Ce te legeni, codrule"
- "Fântână Anghelinei" – dram. A. Burac
- "Dragă, consăteanule" – dram. Gh. Malarciuc
- "Abecedarul" – dram. D. Matcovschi
- "Tata" – dram. D. Matcovschi
- "Pomul vietii" – dram. D. Matcovschi

A scris muzică instrumentală, "Rapsodie"; variații pentru pian, cvintet pentru coarde.

== Bibliography ==
- Boris Parii. Ion și Doina. Doina și Ion. Album. Ch., FC "Basarabia", 1993
- Serafim Buzilă. Interpreți din Moldova. Enciclopedie. Ch., Ed. Arc, Museum 1996; Reeditare 1999.
- Iurie Colesnic (Editor). Chişinău. Enciclopedie. 1997.
- Silvia Bogdănaș. Ion și Doina vor fi eternizați în bronz. Flux. Cotidian Nașional. 1998, 29 iulie
- Eugenia Marin, Ion și Doina. Flux. 1998, Oct 30
- Tudor Țopa. Localitățile Moldovei. Enciclopedie. vol. 3. Chişinău
- Petru Soltan. Calendar Național. Biblioteca Națională a Republicii Moldova. 2008
- Valerian Ciobanu-Vieru. Popas la Valea Adîncă. Chișinău. Pontos, 2005
- Valerian Ciobanu-Vieru. Să zbori din nou//Din lutul iubirii. Chișinău. Pontos. 2007, p. 15
- Gheorghe Ion Marin. Misiuni şi destine, Chișinău. Pontos. 2008
- Alex Găină. Гостинная: Форум: Глобальная демократическая волна: Стукачи) Гостинная: Форум: Глобальная демократическая волна: Стукачи)]
- Dictionar enciclopedic de nume proprii, Ed. Cartier, București- Chișinău, 2004
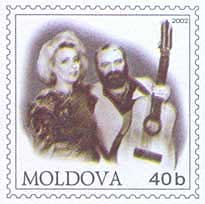
Stamp of Moldova, 2002

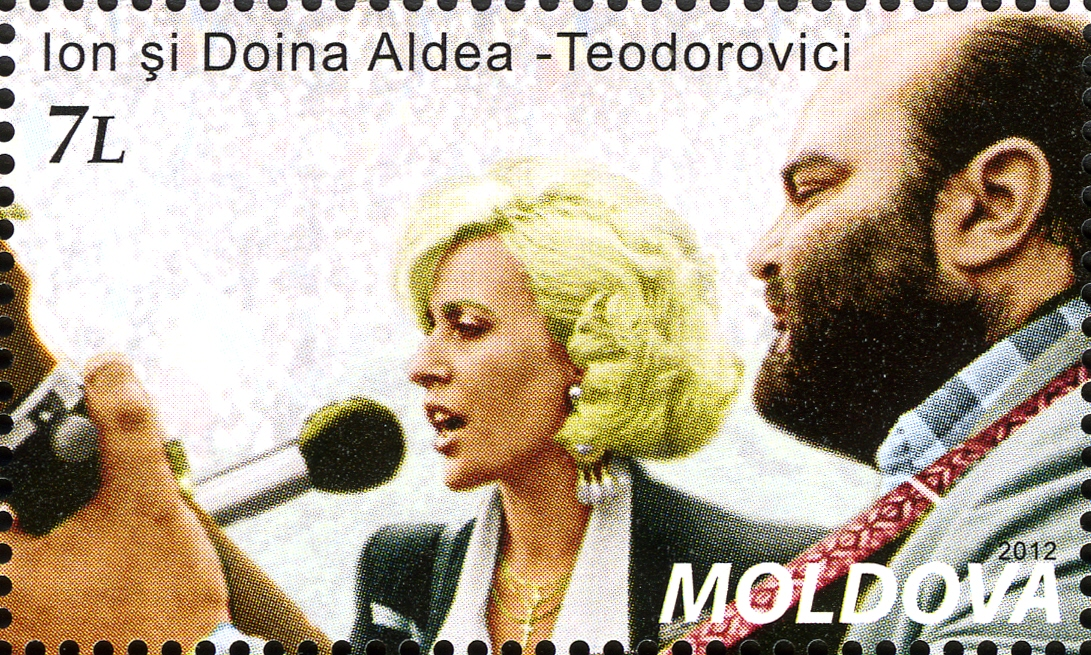
Stamp of Moldova, 2012
