= Alexeevca, Edineț =

Alexeevca
- Village
- Location within Edineț
- Coordinates: 48°5′34″N 27°15′49″E
- Country: Moldova

Government
  - Mayor: Mihail Struc (PSRM)
- Elevation: 178 m (584 ft)

Population (2014 census)
  - Total: 622
- Time zone: UTC+2 (EET)
  - Summer (DST): UTC+3 (EEST)
- Postal code: MD-4611

Alexeevca is a village in Edineț District, Moldova.
