= Anatol Usatîi =

Moldovan politician (born 1976)

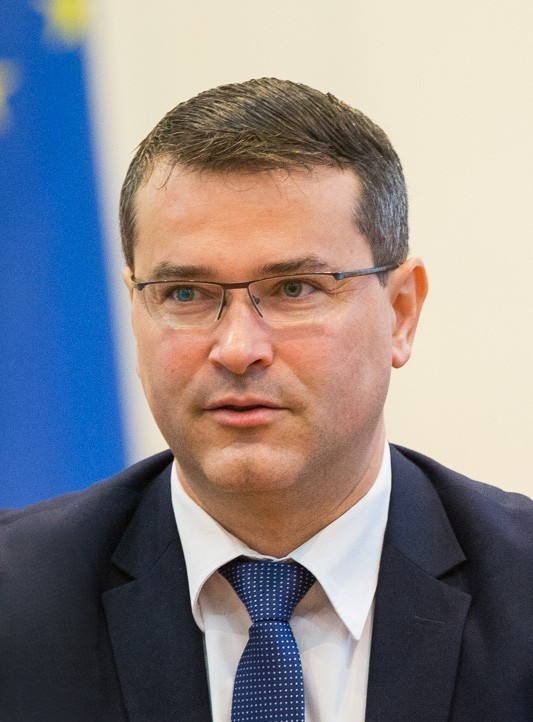
- Usatîi in 2019

Minister of Economy and Infrastructure
- In office 9 November 2020 – 31 December 2020
- President: Igor Dodon; Maia Sandu
- Prime Minister: Ion Chicu
- Preceded by: Sergiu Răilean
- Succeeded by: Sergiu Gaibu
- In office 14 November 2019 – 16 March 2020
- President: Igor Dodon
- Prime Minister: Ion Chicu
- Preceded by: Vadim Brînzan
- Succeeded by: Sergiu Răilean

Secretary of State of the Ministry of Economy and Infrastructure
- In office 25 March 2020 – 9 November 2020
- President: Igor Dodon
- Prime Minister: Ion Chicu
- Minister: Sergiu Răilean
- In office 8 November 2017 – 18 July 2019
- President: Igor Dodon
- Prime Minister: Pavel Filip; Maia Sandu
- Minister: Octavian Calmîc; Chiril Gaburici; Vadim Brînzan

Deputy Minister of Transport and Roads Infrastructure
- In office 31 May 2017 – 7 November 2017
- President: Igor Dodon
- Prime Minister: Pavel Filip
- In office 4 March 2015 – 12 August 2015
- President: Nicolae Timofti
- Prime Minister: Chiril Gaburici; Natalia Gherman (acting); Valeriu Streleț
- Minister: Vasile Botnari; Iurie Chirinciuc

Deputy Minister of Regional Development and Construction
- In office 12 August 2015 – 31 May 2017
- President: Nicolae Timofti; Igor Dodon
- Prime Minister: Valeriu Streleț; Gheorghe Brega (acting); Pavel Filip
- Minister: Vasile Bîtca

Personal details
- Born: 21 July 1976 (age 49) Florești, Moldavian SSR, Soviet Union

Anatol Usatîi (born 21 July 1976) is a Moldovan politician. He served as Minister of Economy and Infrastructure from 9 November 2020 to 31 December 2020 in the cabinet of Prime Minister Ion Chicu. He also served in this position in the same cabinet from 14 November 2019 to 16 March 2020.

Political offices
Preceded by Vadim Brînzan	Minister of Economy and Infrastructure; 2019–2020	Succeeded by Sergiu Răilean
Preceded by Sergiu Răilean	Minister of Economy and Infrastructure; 2020–2020	Vacant
