= Mihai Coșcodan =

Moldovan scientist and politician (1940–2016)

Mihai Coșcodan OR
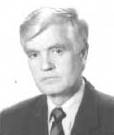

1st Moldovan Ambassador to Bulgaria, Federal Republic of Yugoslavia and Macedonia
- In office 24 June 1994 – 28 July 1998
- President: Mircea Snegur; Petru Lucinschi
- Prime Minister: Andrei Sangheli; Ion Ciubuc
- Succeeded by: Gheorghe Hioară

Deputy Prime Minister of Moldova
- In office 4 August 1992 – 5 April 1994
- President: Mircea Snegur
- Prime Minister: Andrei Sangheli

Member of the Moldovan Parliament
- In office 17 April 1990 – 4 August 1992
- Constituency: Ungheni

Personal details
- Born: 17 October 1940 Năpădeni, Moldavian SSR, Soviet Union
- Died: 29 April 2016 (aged 75) Chișinău, Moldova
- Party: independent
- Children: 2
- Education: Tiraspol Pedagogical Institute, Lviv University
- Profession: University Professor

Mihai Coșcodan (17 October 1940 – 29 April 2016) was a Moldovan university professor, scientist, and politician. He served as a member of the Moldovan Parliament from 1990 to 1994 and was one of the signatories of the Declaration of Independence of Moldova.

== Early life and education ==
Born on 17 October 1940 in Năpădeni, Ungheni district, in the former Moldavian SSR, Coșcodan pursued higher education at the Tiraspol State Pedagogical Institute, specializing in geography and biology. He later earned a Ph.D. and became an associate professor. He began his academic career in 1965 as an assistant in the Department of General Geography at the State University of Tiraspol and continued his postgraduate studies at Lviv University.

== Academic and political career ==
Coșcodan held various academic positions at Tiraspol State University, including head of the Department of General Geography and Cartography from 1970 to 1977 and dean of the Faculty of Geography from 1977 to 1987. He served as rector of the university from 1987 until 1992. His academic contributions were particularly significant in the fields of geography and environmental studies.

In the political sphere, Mihai Coșcodan played a key role during the formative years of independent Moldova. Elected as a member of the first Parliament of the Republic of Moldova from 1990 to 1994, he was actively involved in the country's transition from Soviet rule. In addition to his parliamentary duties, he served as Deputy Prime Minister in the governments of Valeriu Muravschi and Andrei Sangheli between 1992 and 1994.

Coșcodan's courage was also notable during the volatile period of the early 1990s. According to the newspaper Sovereign Moldova, despite Transnistrian leader Igor Smirnov's prohibitions, Coșcodan, as rector of the Tiraspol Pedagogical Institute, ensured that a polling station was opened in Tiraspol during the presidential elections, demonstrating his commitment to democratic processes.

== Diplomatic service and later career ==
After his parliamentary term, Coșcodan transitioned into diplomatic roles, serving as Moldova’s ambassador to Bulgaria from 1994 to 1998. He also held ambassadorships to the Federal Republic of Yugoslavia and the Republic of Macedonia during this period. Following his diplomatic service, he returned to academia, joining the Free International University of Moldova as Deputy Rector and later taking on leadership roles at Moldova State University.

== Honours ==
- Order of the Republic (Moldova) No. 0377
- Medal "Meritul Civic" No. 00853
- Bulgaria, Order of the Madara Horseman, First Class, Decree No. 234 (07.07.1998) [BG Wiki: Носители на орден „Мадарски конник“ (Recipients of the "Madara Horseman" Order)]

== Main publications ==
1. Опыт микроклиматической характеристики природных территориальных комплексов на примере Кодр (Молдавская ССР) (Experience of Microclimatic Characteristics of Natural Territorial Complexes on the Example of Codri (Moldavian SSR))
  Authors: М. Ф. Кошкодан
  Author's Abstract of PhD Dissertation, Publisher: Lviv, 1971
2. Климат. Молдавская ССР (Climate. Moldavian SSR)
  Authors: Константинова Т. С., Дубовка Ф. В., Кошкодан М. Ф.
  Publisher: Kishinev, 1979
3. Природные условия Молдавской ССР и их хозяйственное значение: вопросы географии (Natural Conditions of the Moldavian SSR and Their Economic Importance: Issues of Geography)
  Authors: М. Ф. Кошкодан, Institute of Pedagogy "T. Shevchenko"
  Publisher: "Ştiinţa", 1988
  ISBN 5-376-00517-8, ISBN 978-5-376-00517-0
  Length: 89 pages
4. Resursele naturale ale Republicii Moldova (Natural Resources of the Republic of Moldova)
  Authors: V. Sochircă, M. Coşcodan, T. Constantinov (AŞM), C. Mihailescu
  Publisher: Î.E.P. „Ştiinţa”, Chişinău, 2006
  Length: 184 pages
