= Alexeevca, Florești =

Alexeevca
- Commune
- Location within Moldova
- Coordinates: 47°56′38″N 28°17′09″E
- Country: Moldova
- District: Florești District

Population (2014)
  - Total: 1,169
- Time zone: UTC+2 (EET)
  - Summer (DST): UTC+3 (EEST)

Alexeevca is a commune in Floreşti District, Moldova. It is composed of four villages: Alexeevca, Chirilovca, Dumitreni and Rădulenii Noi.
