= Nicolae Andronati =

Moldovan politician (1935–2026)

Nicolae Andronati OR

First Deputy Prime Minister of Moldova
- In office 4 August 1992 – 5 April 1994
- President: Mircea Snegur
- Prime Minister: Andrei Sangheli
- Preceded by: Constantin Oboroc
- Succeeded by: Nicolae Andronic (1999)

Member of the Moldovan Parliament
- In office 10 March 1990 – 4 August 1992
- Constituency: Chișinău

Personal details
- Born: 7 November 1935 Caragaș, Moldavian ASSR, Ukrainian SSR, Soviet Union (now Moldova)
- Died: 24 February 2026 (aged 90) Caragaș, Transnistria, Moldova

Nicolae Andronati (7 November 1935 – 24 February 2026) was a Moldovan politician.

== Life and career ==
Andronati was a signatory of the Declaration of Independence on 27 August 1991 and a deputy in the first parliament of the Republic of Moldova (1990–1994).

He was a member of the Academy of Sciences of Moldova.

Andronati was killed at his home in the village of Caragaș, on 24 February 2026, at the age of 90.

== Awards ==
- 1996: Medal of Civic Merit
- 2012: Order of the Republic
