= Ion Cazacliu =

Romanian politician (1869–1933)

Member of the Moldovan Parliament
- In office 1917–1918

Personal details
- Born: 1870
- Died: 1933 (aged 62–63) Chişinău
- Relations: Grigore Cazacliu (nephew); Vladimir Cazacliu (nephew)

Ion Cazacliu (born in 1869, Cușelăuca, Șoldănești District, Bessarabia - died in 1933, Chişinău) official, Romanian politician, member of the Moldovan Parliament.

== Biography ==
He served as Member of the Moldovan Parliament (1917–1918). The Cazacliu family played an important role in the Great Union; Ion Cazacliu was the uncle of Grigore Cazacliu and Vladimir Cazacliu (the two, Grigore and Vladimir were brothers).

== Gallery ==
Moldovan stamp, 1998
