= Alexeevca, Ungheni =

Alexeevca
- Commune
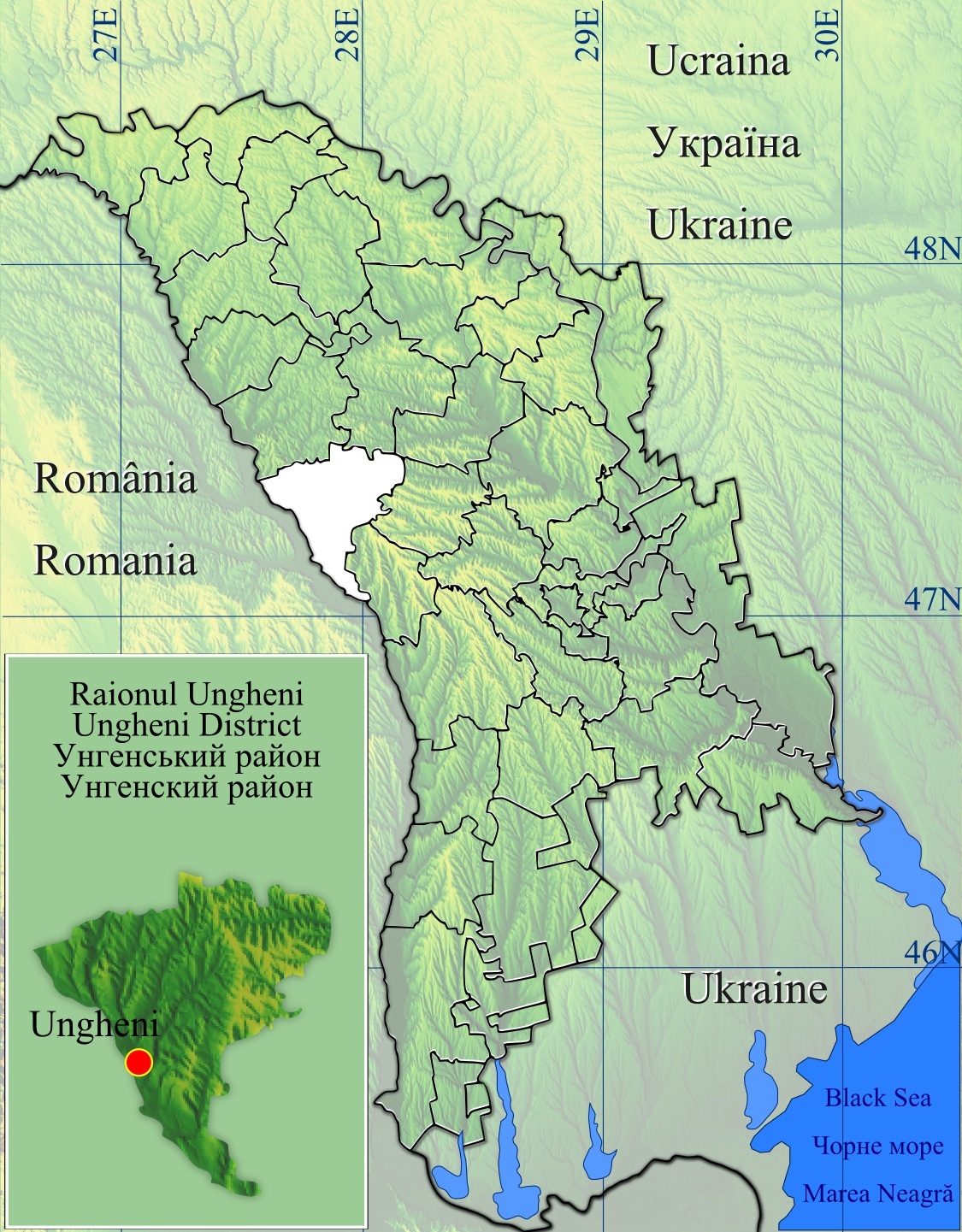
- Location within Ungheni
- Coordinates: 47°16′9″N 27°56′17″E
- Country: Moldova

Government
  - Mayor: Ion Hanganu, Partidul Comunist

Population (2014)
  - Total: 1,093
- Time zone: UTC+2 (EET)
  - Summer (DST): UTC+3 (EEST)
- Postal code: MD-3612

Alexeevca is a commune in Ungheni District, Moldova. It is composed of three villages: Alexeevca, Lidovca and Săghieni.
