= Ion Ciubuc =

Prime Minister of Moldova from 1997 to 1999

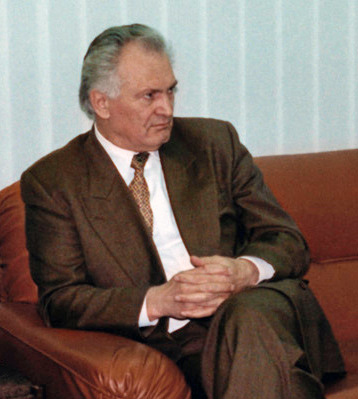
- Ciubuc in 1998

3rd Prime Minister of Moldova
- In office 24 January 1997 – 1 February 1999
- President: Petru Lucinschi
- Deputy: See list: Valeriu Bulgari Ion Guțu Ion Sturza Valentin Dolganiuc Oleg Stratulat Nicolae Andronic
- Preceded by: Andrei Sangheli
- Succeeded by: Ion Sturza

1st President of the Court of Accounts
- In office 27 December 1994 – 6 March 1997
- Succeeded by: Vasile Cozma

First Deputy Minister of Economy
- In office April 1994 – 27 December 1994
- President: Mircea Snegur
- Prime Minister: Andrei Sangheli
- Minister: Valeriu Bobuțac

First Deputy Minister of Foreign Affairs
- In office September 1992 – April 1994
- President: Mircea Snegur
- Prime Minister: Andrei Sangheli
- Minister: Nicolae Țâu

First Deputy Prime Minister of Moldova
- In office 28 May 1991 – 1 July 1992 Serving with: Andrei Sangheli; Constantin Oboroc
- President: Mircea Snegur
- Prime Minister: Valeriu Muravschi
- Succeeded by: Nicolae Andronati

Personal details
- Born: 29 May 1943 Hădărăuți, Kingdom of Romania (now Moldova)
- Died: 29 January 2018 (aged 74) Chișinău, Moldova
- Resting place: Chișinău Central Cemetery
- Party: Alliance for Democracy and Reforms
- Education: Odesa State Agrarian University

Ion Ciubuc (Romanian: [iˈon tʃjuˈbuk]; 29 May 1943 – 29 January 2018) was a Moldovan economist and politician who served as the 3rd Prime Minister of Moldova from January 1997 to February 1999.

== Biography ==
Ion Ciubuc was born on 29 May 1943 in the village of Hădărăuți, at the time in Hotin County, today in Ocnița District. He graduated from the Agricultural Institute in Odessa in 1970, obtaining the qualification of a specialist in the agrarian economy. He subsequently obtained his Ph.D. in economics.

He initially worked as an economist at the "1 Mai" kolkhoz in the village of Hădărăuți (1960–1963), after which he satisfied his compulsory military service in the Soviet Army (1963–1966). Returned to Moldavian SSR, he is appointed chief economist and president of the kolkhoz in the villages of Hădărăuți and Trebisăuți (1966–1973), then chairman of the Kolkhoz Council of the Briceni district (1973–1975).

He is sent to a political training course, organized by the Academy of Social Sciences of the Central Committee of the Communist Party of the Soviet Union, after which he becomes an instructor of PCM in the city of Chisinau (1975–1976). He was then transferred to Moscow as an auditor at the Academy of Sciences of the CC of the PCU (1976–1978). He returned to Moldavian SSR, being appointed as first secretary of the Vulcănești District Committee, of the Communist Party of the Moldavian SSR(1978–1984).

He worked between 1960 and 1984 in various positions in several economic units and state institutions. Between 1984 and 1986 he was First Deputy Chairman of the State Planning Committee (Gosplan) of Moldavian SSR. Then, from 1986 to 1989, he worked as head of the Agricultural Research Department from the Institute of Scientific Research in the field of Agriculture in Moldavian SSR. Until 1990, he held the position of vice-president of agro-industrial complex of Moldavian SSR.

He died in 2018, aged 74.

Political offices
| Preceded by Andrei Sangheli | Prime Minister of Moldova; 1997–1999 | Succeeded by Serafim Urechean |
