= Ministry of Economic Development and Digitalization =

Government ministry of Moldova

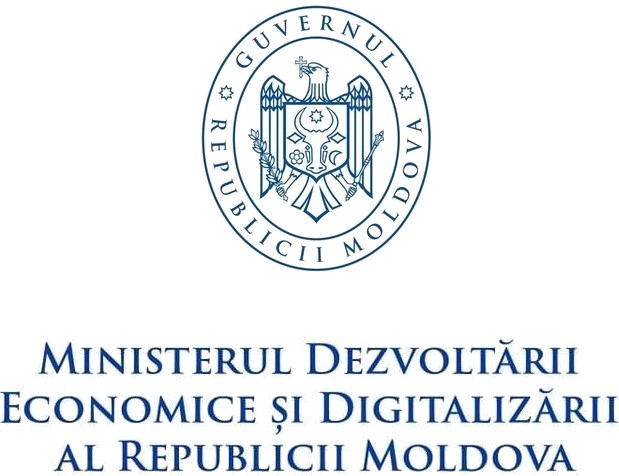

Ministry overview
- Formed: 6 June 1990; 36 years ago (as Ministry of Economy and Finance)
- Preceding agencies: Ministry of Economy and Infrastructure (2017–2021); Ministry of Economy and Trade (2005–2009); Ministry of Economy and Reforms (1997–2001); Ministry of Economy and Finance (1991–1992)
- Jurisdiction: Government of Moldova
- Headquarters: Government House, Chișinău
- Minister responsible: Claudiu Năsui, Minister of Economic Development and Digitalization
- Ministry executives: Ina Voicu, Secretary General; Cristina Ceban, Secretary of State for Quality Infrastructure and Economic Cooperation; Oleg Bivol, Secretary of State for Industrial Development, Investment and Public Property; Natalia Selevestru, Secretary of State for Business Environment, Access to Finance and Deregulation; Michelle Iliev, Secretary of State for Digitalization; Alina Dandara, Secretary of State for Tourism
- Website: mded.gov.md

The Ministry of Economic Development and Digitalization (Romanian: Ministerul Dezvoltării Economice și Digitalizării) is one of the fourteen ministries of the Government of Moldova.

== History ==
Ministry of Economy of Moldova was founded on 1 June 1990, as Ministry of National Economy of SSR Moldova, while Moldova was part of Soviet Union. Over years, it was restructured a few times and renamed, as follows:

- Ministry of Economy and Finance (1991–1992)
- Ministry of Economy (1992–1997)
- Ministry of Economy and Reforms (1997–2001)
- Ministry of Economy (2001–2005)
- Ministry of Economy and Trade (2005–2009)
- Ministry of Economy (2009–2017)
- Ministry of Economy and Infrastructure (2017–2021)
- Ministry of Economy (2021–2023)
- Ministry of Economic Development and Digitalization (2023–present)

In 2017 as part of the government reform in Moldova, the Ministry of Economy was renamed to Ministry of Economy and Infrastructure, absorbing the Ministry of Transport and Roads Infrastructure, and the Ministry of Informational Technologies and Communications, becoming their legal successor. Also this ministry took the domain of constructions from the former Minister of Construction and Regional Development.

== List of ministers ==
No.	Portrait	Name (Birth–Death)	Office term		Notes	Cabinet
1		Constantin Tampiza (born 1947)	6 June 1990	1 July 1992	Deputy Prime Minister (1991–1992)	Druc Muravschi
2		Sergiu Certan (born 1952)	1 July 1992	5 April 1994		Sangheli I
3		Valeriu Bobuțac (born 1945)	5 April 1994	24 January 1997	Deputy Prime Minister	Sangheli II
4		Ion Guțu (born 1943)	24 January 1997	22 May 1998	Deputy Prime MInister	Ciubuc I
5		Ion Sturza (born 1960)	22 May 1998	12 March 1999	Deputy Prime Minister	Ciubuc II
6		Alexandr Muravschi (born 1950)	12 March 1999	21 December 1999	Deputy Prime Minister	Sturza
7		Eugeniu Șlopac (born 1951)	21 December 1999	15 March 2000	Deputy Prime Minister	Braghiș
8		Andrei Cucu (born 1948)	15 March 2000	4 February 2002	Deputy Prime Minister	Braghiș Tarlev I
9		Ștefan Odagiu (born 1965)	16 May 2002	2 July 2003	Deputy Prime Minister	Tarlev I
10		Marian Lupu (born 1966)	5 August 2003	24 March 2005		Tarlev I
10		Valeriu Lazăr (born 1968)	19 April 2005	18 September 2006		Tarlev II
11		Igor Dodon (born 1975)	18 September 2006	14 September 2009	First Deputy Prime Minister (2008–2009)	Tarlev II Greceanîi I-II
12		Valeriu Lazăr (born 1968)	25 September 2009	3 July 2014	Deputy Prime Minister (2009–2013)	Filat I-II Leancă
13		Andrian Candu (born 1975)	3 July 2014	23 January 2015	Deputy Prime Minister	Leancă
14		Stéphane Christophe Bridé (born 1971)	18 February 2015	20 January 2016	Deputy Prime Minister	Gaburici Streleț
15		Octavian Calmîc (born 1974)	20 January 2016	21 December 2017	Deputy Prime Minister	Filip
16		Chiril Gaburici (born 1976)	10 January 2018	8 June 2019		Filip
17		Vadim Brînzan (born 1971)	8 June 2019	14 November 2019		Sandu
18		Anatol Usatîi (born 1976)	14 November 2019	16 March 2020		Chicu
19		Sergiu Răilean (born 1976)	16 March 2020	9 November 2020		Chicu
20		Anatol Usatîi (born 1976)	9 November 2020	31 December 2020		Chicu
21		Sergiu Gaibu (born 1976)	6 August 2021	16 November 2022		Gavrilița
22		Dumitru Alaiba (born 1982)	16 November 2022	14 March 2025	Deputy Prime Minister (2023–2025)	Gavrilița; Recean
23		Doina Nistor (born 1977)	14 March 2025	1 November 2025	Deputy Prime Minister	Recean
24		Eugen Osmochescu (born 1972)	1 November 2025	28 August 2026	Deputy Prime Minister Acting Prime Minister (2026)	Munteanu Tofan
25		Claudiu Năsui (born 1985)	28 August 2026	Incumbent		Tofan
