= Andrei Sangheli =

Prime Minister of Moldova from 1992 to 1997

Andrei Sangheli OR

2nd Prime Minister of Moldova
- In office 1 July 1992 – 24 January 1997
- President: Mircea Snegur; Petru Lucinschi
- Deputy: See list: Nicolae Andronati Valentin Cunev Mihai Coșcodan Nicolae Oleinic Ion Guțu Valeriu Bulgari Grigore Ojog
- Preceded by: Valeriu Muravschi
- Succeeded by: Ion Ciubuc

Member of the Moldovan Parliament
- In office 27 February 1994 – 5 April 1994
- Succeeded by: Nicolae Vizitei
- Parliamentary group: Democratic Agrarian Party

First Deputy Prime Minister of Moldova
- In office 6 June 1990 – 1 July 1992 Serving with: Ion Ciubuc; Constantin Oboroc
- President: Mircea Snegur
- Prime Minister: Mircea Druc; Valeriu Muravschi

1st Minister of Agriculture and Food Industry
- In office 6 June 1990 – 1 July 1992
- President: Mircea Snegur
- Prime Minister: Mircea Druc; Valeriu Muravschi
- Succeeded by: Vitalie Gorincioi

Personal details
- Born: 20 July 1944 (age 82) Grinăuți-Moldova, Moldavian SSR, Soviet Union
- Party: Democratic Agrarian Party of Moldova
- Education: State Agrarian University of Moldova

Andrei Sangheli (born 20 July 1944) is a Moldovan politician.

Sangheli was the second Prime Minister of Moldova from 1992 until 1997. He represented the Moldovenist group of the Agrarian Party of Moldova.

Political offices
Preceded by Valeriu Muravschi	Prime Minister of Moldova; 1992–1997	Succeeded by Ion Ciubuc
