= Ion Sturza =

Prime Minister of Moldova in 1999

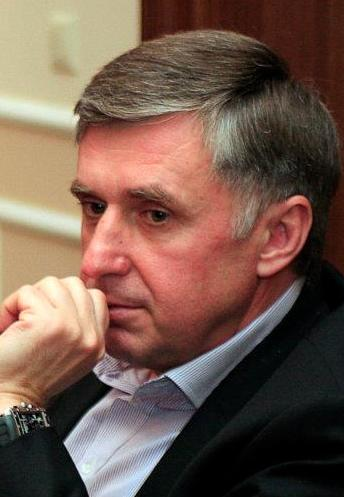
- Sturza in 2016

4th Prime Minister of Moldova
- In office 12 March 1999 – 21 December 1999
- President: Petru Lucinschi
- Deputy: Nicolae Andronic; Oleg Stratulat; Alexandru Muravschi
- Preceded by: Ion Ciubuc
- Succeeded by: Dumitru Braghiș

Deputy Prime Minister of Moldova
- In office 22 May 1998 – 17 February 1999
- President: Petru Lucinschi
- Prime Minister: Ion Ciubuc
- Preceded by: Valeriu Bobuțac
- Succeeded by: Alexandru Muravschi

Minister of Economy and Reforms
- In office 22 May 1998 – 17 February 1999
- President: Petru Lucinschi
- Prime Minister: Ion Ciubuc
- Preceded by: Valeriu Bobuțac
- Succeeded by: Alexandru Muravschi

Member of the Moldovan Parliament
- In office 9 April 1998 – 28 May 1998
- Succeeded by: Leonid Zaharia
- Parliamentary group: Democratic and Prosperous Moldova Electoral Bloc

Personal details
- Born: 9 May 1960 (age 66) Pîrjolteni, Moldavian SSR, Soviet Union (now Moldova)
- Citizenship: Moldova; Romania
- Party: Alliance for Democracy and Reforms (1998–1999)
- Spouse: Stela Sturza
- Children: 2
- Education: Moldova State University

Ion Sturza (born 9 May 1960) is a Moldovan politician and businessman who served as Prime Minister of Moldova from 19 February to 12 November 1999. On 21 December 2015, President Nicolae Timofti nominated Ion Sturza to occupy the position of prime minister for a second time. However, Ion Sturza gave up the mandate, after the meeting in which his cabinet should receive the investiture vote was not held due to lack of quorum.

== Education and early professional career ==
Born in Pîrjolteni, Călărași district, Ion Sturza graduated his studies in economics at the Moldova State University.

Before the fall of the USSR in 1991, Sturza worked for the country's Exterior Commerce Company. In 1991, he founded the Incon Company, based in Chișinău, which soon became one of Moldova's largest industrial groups, operating in the food and beverages industry. He worked as the president of "FinComBank" in Chișinău and, from 1996, as the chairman of the Bank's Steering Board. Currently, Sturza is the founder and chairman of Fribourg Capital, a private equity and venture capital fund.

== As Prime Minister of Moldova ==
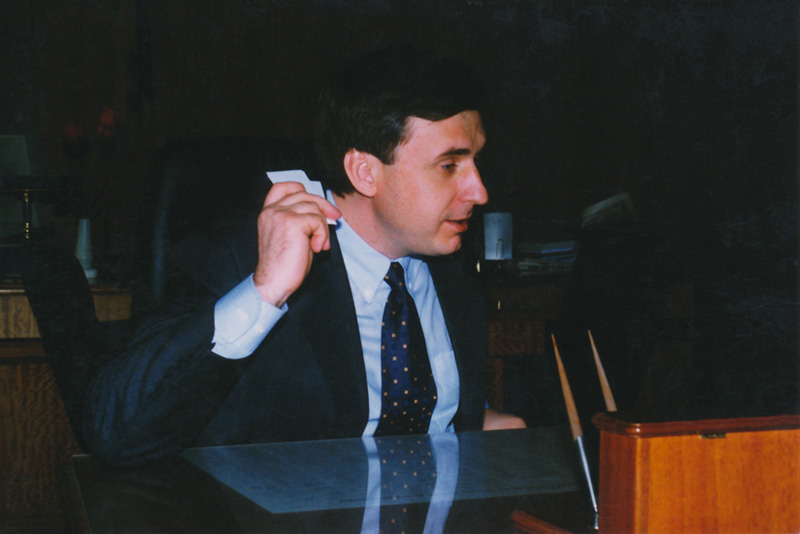
Sturza in 1999

Ion Sturza gained broad political experience as he was a prominent politician in Moldova. He was selected as a member of the Parliament in 1998, and he subsequently became the Vice Prime Minister and Minister of the Economy. He served as Prime Minister from 19 February 1999 to 12 November 1999.

== International position ==
As former Prime Minister of Moldova he signed in 2011 the Soros open letter calling for more Europe in the single currency turmoil.

In April 2016 Sturza's name was included on a list of prominent business, government and former government people around the globe in the Panama Papers.

== Civic activities ==
Ion Sturza is involved in various civic activities, being an active member of several organizations and charities. Among others, he is the founder of the Family Sturza Foundation, which has a wide range of support programmes that include giving educational grants and scholarships, supporting orphanages, and sponsoring cultural events.

Political offices
Preceded by Ion Ciubuc	Prime Minister of Moldova; 1999	Succeeded by Dumitru Braghiș
Preceded by Ion Ciubuc	Deputy Prime Minister, Minister of Economy and Reforms; 1998–1999	Succeeded by Alexandr Muravschi
