= Chicu Cabinet =

Government of Moldova

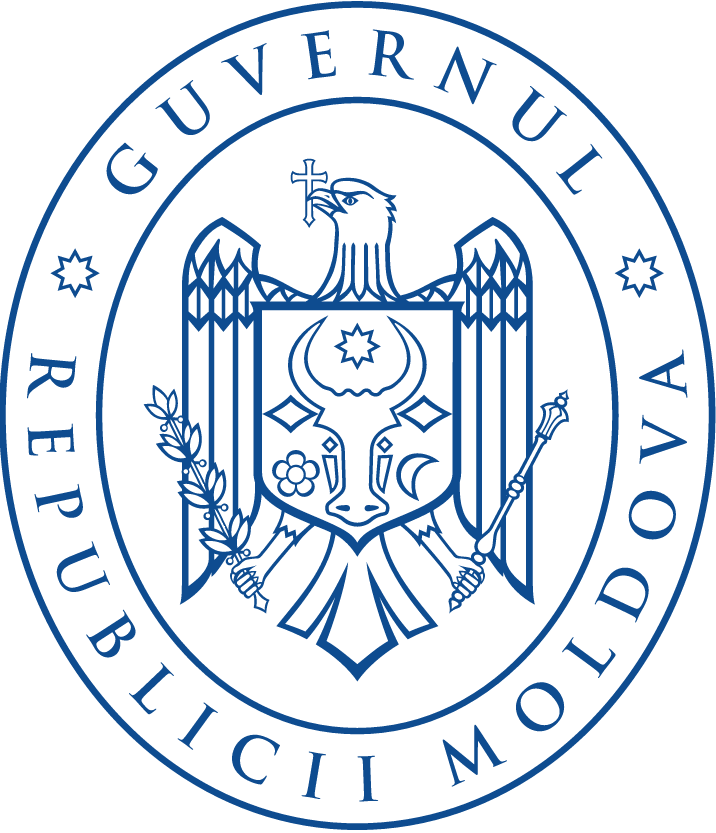
- 19th Cabinet of Moldova

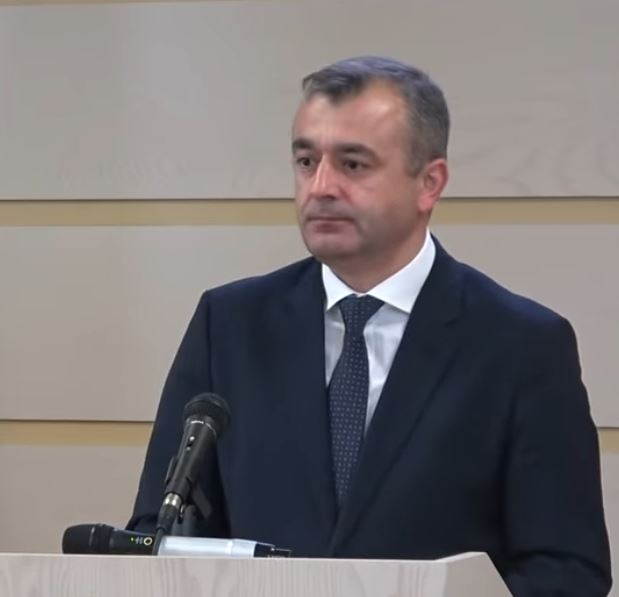
- Prime Minister Ion Chicu
- Date formed: 14 November 2019
- Date dissolved: 6 August 2021

People and organisations
- Head of state: Maia Sandu (2020→); Igor Dodon (2019–2020)
- Head of government: Ion Chicu (until 31 December 2020); Aureliu Ciocoi (acting from 31 December 2020)
- Deputy head of government: Sergiu Pușcuța; Alexandru Flenchea; Cristina Lesnic; Olga Cebotari
- No. of ministers: 9+2
- Ministers removed: 13
- Member parties: PSRM; PDM (until 7 November 2020)
- Status in legislature: Minority coalition government (since June 2020)
- Opposition parties: Șor Party; PPDA; PAS
- Opposition leaders: Ilan Shor; Alexandru Slusari; Igor Grosu

History
- Election: 2019
- Predecessor: Sandu Cabinet
- Successor: Gavrilița Cabinet

The Chicu Cabinet was a Cabinet of Moldova, led by Ion Chicu. It was formed on 14 November 2019 two days after the Sandu Cabinet led by Maia Sandu was ousted in a vote of no confidence. With the support of just over 60% of MPs in the Parliament of Moldova, Chicu was approved as a replacement Prime Minister. The Cabinet was dissolved on 6 August 2021, being followed by Gavrilița Cabinet.

== Composition ==
Prime Minister and Deputy Prime Ministers in the Chicu cabinet
Title	Minister		Term of office		Party
Title	Image	Name	Start	End	Party
Prime Minister		Ion Chicu	14 November 2019	31 December 2020	Independent
Prime Minister		Aureliu Ciocoi (acting)	31 December 2020	6 August 2021	Independent
Deputy Prime Minister		Sergiu Pușcuța	14 November 2019	31 December 2020	Independent
Deputy Prime Minister for Reintegration		Alexandru Flenchea	14 November 2019	16 March 2020	Independent
Deputy Prime Minister for Reintegration		Cristina Lesnic	16 March 2020	9 November 2020	PDM
Deputy Prime Minister for Reintegration		Olga Cebotari	9 November 2020	6 August 2021	PSRM

Ministers in the Chicu cabinet
Title	Minister		Term of office		Party
Title	Image	Name	Start	End	Party
Minister of Agriculture, Regional Development and Environment		Ion Perju	8 June 2019	6 August 2021	Independent
Minister of Defense		Victor Gaiciuc	14 November 2019	16 March 2020	PSRM
Minister of Defense		Alexandru Pînzari	16 March 2020	9 November 2020	PDM
Minister of Defense		Victor Gaiciuc	9 November 2020	6 August 2021	PSRM
Minister of Economy and Infrastructure		Anatol Usatîi	14 November 2019	16 March 2020	Independent
Minister of Economy and Infrastructure		Sergiu Răilean	16 March 2020	9 November 2020	PDM
Minister of Economy and Infrastructure		Anatol Usatîi	9 November 2020	31 December 2020	Independent
Minister of Education, Culture and Research		Corneliu Popovici	14 November 2019	16 March 2020	Independent
Minister of Education, Culture and Research		Igor Șarov	16 March 2020	9 November 2020	PDM
Minister of Education, Culture and Research		Corneliu Popovici	9 November 2020	6 August 2021	Independent
Minister of Finance		Sergiu Pușcuța	14 November 2019	31 December 2020	Independent
Minister of Foreign Affairs and European Integration		Aureliu Ciocoi	14 November 2019	16 March 2020	Independent
Minister of Foreign Affairs and European Integration		Oleg Țulea	16 March 2020	9 November 2020	PDM
Minister of Foreign Affairs and European Integration		Aureliu Ciocoi	9 November 2020	6 August 2021	Independent
Minister of Health, Labour and Social Protection		Viorica Dumbrăveanu	14 November 2019	31 December 2020	Independent
Minister of Internal Affairs		Pavel Voicu	14 November 2019	6 August 2021	PSRM
Minister of Justice		Fadei Nagacevschi	14 November 2019	6 August 2021	Independent
Governor of Gagauzia		Irina Vlah	15 April 2015	19 July 2023	Independent

The Başkan (Governor) of Gagauzia is elected by universal, equal, direct, secret and free suffrage on an alternative basis for a term of 4 years. One and the same person can be a governor for no more than two consecutive terms. The Başkan of Gagauzia is confirmed as a member of the Moldovan government by a decree of the President of Moldova.

Preceded by Sandu Cabinet	Cabinet of Moldova; 14 November 2019 – 6 August 2021	Succeeded by Gavrilița Cabinet
