= Gabriela Cuneva =

Moldovan economist (born 1976)

Gabriela Cuneva MP
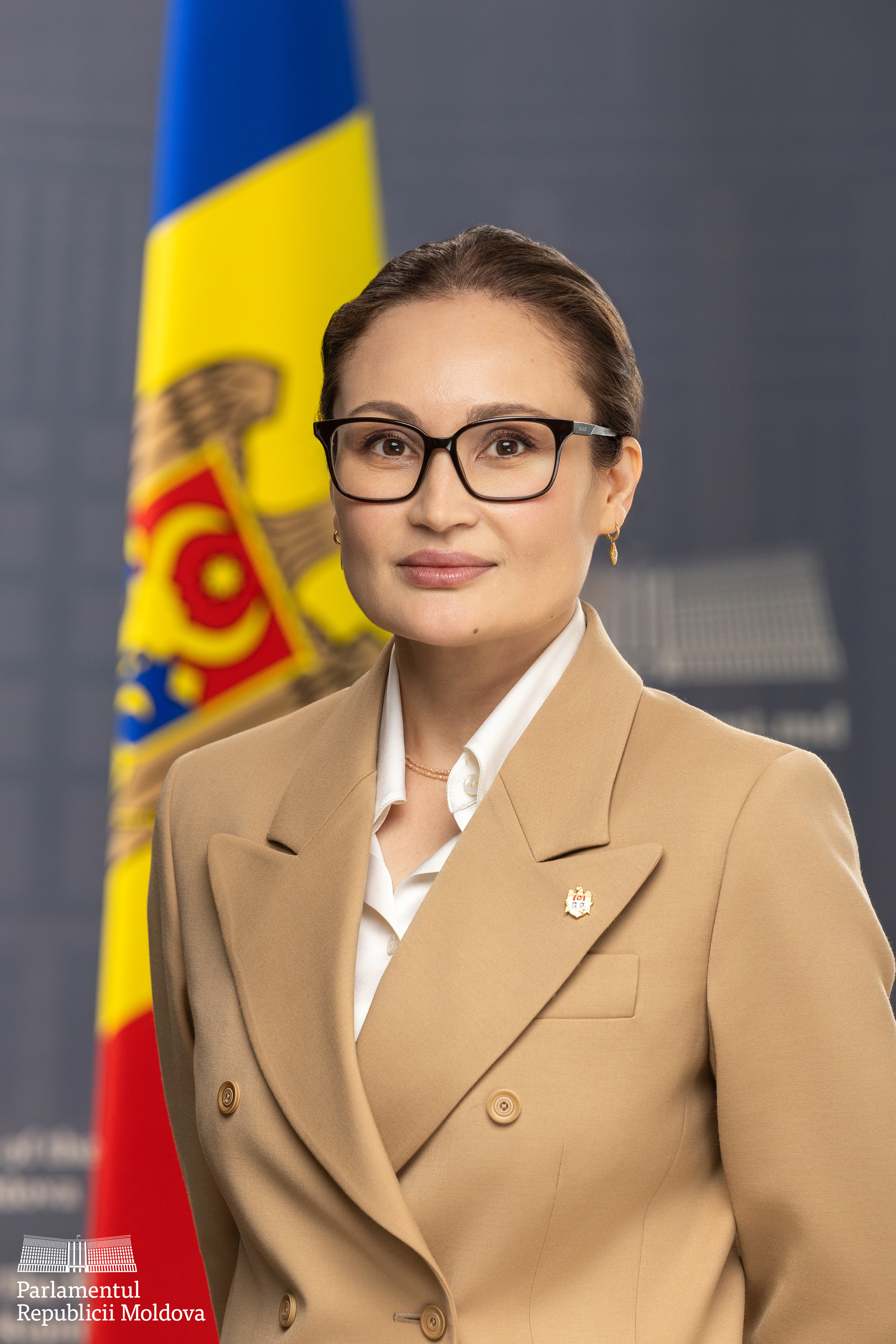
- Official portrait, 2025

Member of the Moldovan Parliament
- Incumbent
- Assumed office 22 October 2025
- Parliamentary group: Alternative Bloc

Secretary of State of the Ministry of Finance
- In office 3 January 2020 – 9 August 2021
- President: Igor Dodon; Maia Sandu
- Prime Minister: Ion Chicu; Aureliu Ciocoi (acting); Natalia Gavrilița
- Minister: Sergiu Pușcuța; Dumitru Budianschi

Secretary General of the Ministry of Finance
- In office 11 February 2019 – 21 August 2019
- President: Igor Dodon
- Prime Minister: Pavel Filip; Maia Sandu
- Minister: Ion Chicu; Natalia Gavrilița
- Preceded by: Ion Chicu
- Succeeded by: Iurie Pașinschi

Personal details
- Born: 8 August 1976 (age 49)
- Education: Academy of Economic Studies of Moldova; Newport International University

Gabriela Cuneva (born 8 August 1976) is a Moldovan economist. Since 2025 she is a member of the Moldovan Parliament.
