= Veronica Sirețeanu =

Moldovan economist and politician (born 1985)

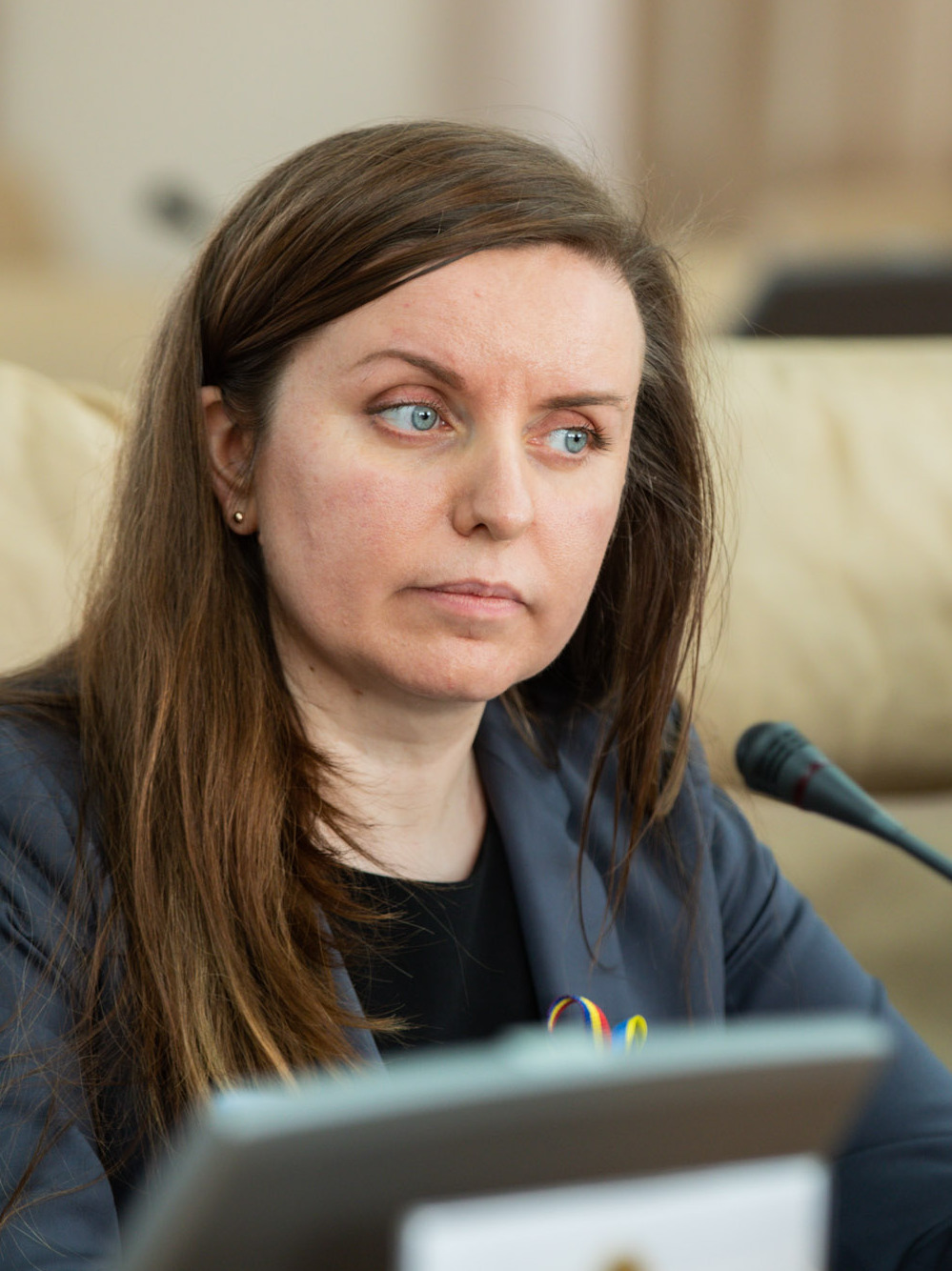
- Sirețeanu in 2023

Minister of Finance
- In office 16 February 2023 – 27 September 2023
- President: Maia Sandu
- Prime Minister: Dorin Recean
- Preceded by: Dumitru Budianschi
- Succeeded by: Petru Rotaru

Secretary of State of the Ministry of Finance
- In office 7 November 2017 – 4 December 2019
- President: Igor Dodon
- Prime Minister: Pavel Filip; Maia Sandu; Ion Chicu
- Minister: Octavian Armașu; Ion Chicu; Natalia Gavrilița; Sergiu Pușcuța

Deputy Minister of Finance
- In office 17 February 2016 – 7 November 2017
- President: Nicolae Timofti; Igor Dodon
- Prime Minister: Pavel Filip
- Minister: Octavian Armașu

Personal details
- Born: 4 November 1985 (age 40) Chișinău, Moldavian SSR, Soviet Union
- Education: Academy of Economic Studies of Moldova

Veronica Sirețeanu (born 4 November 1985) is a Moldovan economist. She has served in various governmental capacities at the Ministry of Finance of Moldova.
