= Mihail Manoli =

Moldovan economist and diplomat (born 1954)

Moldovan Ambassador to the United States, Canada and Mexico
- In office 18 May 2002 – 19 May 2006
- President: Vladimir Voronin
- Prime Minister: Vasile Tarlev
- Preceded by: Ceslav Ciobanu
- Succeeded by: Nicolae Chirtoacă

Minister of Finance
- In office 21 December 1999 – 26 February 2002
- President: Petru Lucinschi; Vladimir Voronin
- Prime Minister: Dumitru Braghiș; Vasile Tarlev
- Preceded by: Anatol Arapu
- Succeeded by: Zinaida Greceanîi

Deputy Minister of Finance
- In office 15 December 1995 – 21 December 1999
- President: Mircea Snegur; Petru Lucinschi
- Prime Minister: Andrei Sangheli; Ion Ciubuc; Ion Sturza
- Minister: Valeriu Chițan; Anatol Arapu

Personal details
- Born: 20 September 1954 (age 71) Valea Mare, Moldavian SSR, Soviet Union

Mihail Manoli (born 20 September 1954) is a Moldovan economist and diplomat. He served as Minister of Finance of Moldova from 1999 until 2002.
