= Bălțați (disambiguation) =

Bălţaţi may refer to several places in Romania:

- Bălțați, a commune in Iaşi County
- Bălţaţi, a village in Scorniceşti Town, Olt County
- Bălţaţi, a village in Tătărăni Commune, Vaslui County
- Bălţaţi, a former name for Stejaru, Teleorman, Teleorman County

and to:

- Bălţaţi, a village in Ţipala Commune, Ialoveni district, Moldova
