= Delacău =

Delacău may refer to several places in Moldova:

- Delacău, Anenii Noi, a commune in Anenii Noi district
- Delacău, Transnistria, a commune in Transnistria
