= Ghizdita =

Ghizdita may refer to:

- Ghizdita, a village in Mânzălești Commune, Buzău County, Romania
- Ghizdita, a village in Fîntîniţa Commune, Drochia district, Moldova
