= Ion Chicu =

Prime Minister of Moldova from 2019 to 2020

Ion Chicu MP
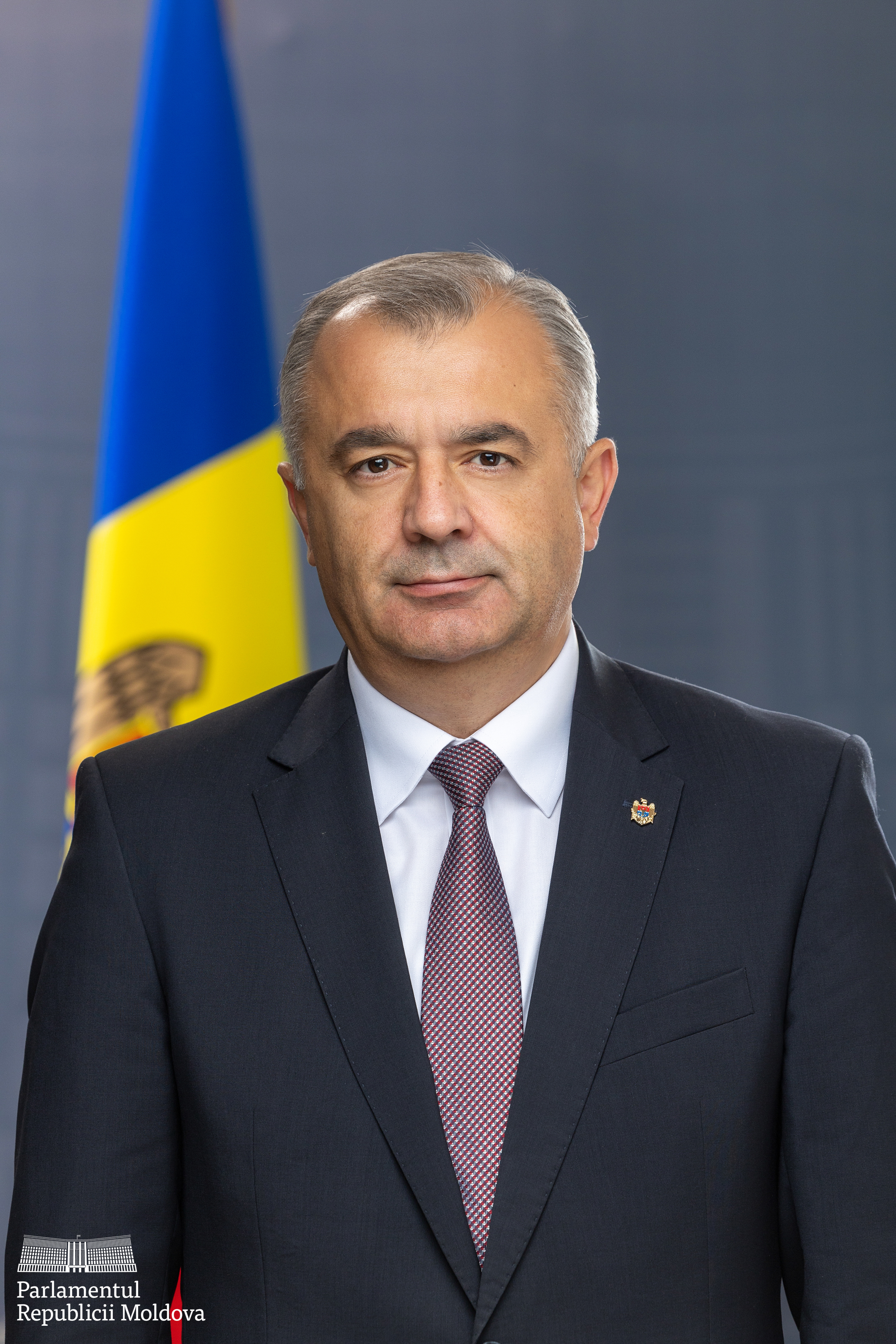
- Official portrait, 2025

Member of the Moldovan Parliament
- Incumbent
- Assumed office 22 October 2025
- Parliamentary group: Alternative Bloc

President of the Party of Development and Consolidation of Moldova
- Incumbent
- Assumed office 14 April 2021
- Preceded by: Party established

14th Prime Minister of Moldova
- In office 14 November 2019 – 31 December 2020
- President: Igor Dodon; Maia Sandu
- Deputy: See list: Sergiu Pușcuța Alexandru Flenchea Cristina Lesnic Olga Cebotari
- Preceded by: Maia Sandu
- Succeeded by: Aureliu Ciocoi (acting)

Financial Advisor to the President
- In office 8 July 2019 – 14 November 2019
- President: Igor Dodon

Minister of Finance
- In office 10 December 2018 – 8 June 2019
- President: Igor Dodon
- Prime Minister: Pavel Filip
- Preceded by: Octavian Armașu
- Succeeded by: Natalia Gavrilița

Secretary General of the Ministry of Finance
- In office 2 January 2018 – 10 December 2018
- President: Igor Dodon
- Prime Minister: Pavel Filip
- Minister: Octavian Armașu
- Succeeded by: Gabriela Cuneva

Deputy Minister of Finance
- In office 1 March 2006 – 4 April 2008
- President: Vladimir Voronin
- Prime Minister: Vasile Tarlev; Zinaida Greceanîi
- Minister: Mihail Pop; Mariana Durleșteanu

Personal details
- Born: 28 February 1972 (age 54) Pîrjolteni, Moldavian SSR, Soviet Union (now Moldova)
- Citizenship: Moldova; Romania
- Party: PDCM (since 2021); Alternative (since 2025)
- Other political affiliations: Liberal Party (1998); Independent (1998–2021)
- Children: 3
- Education: Academy of Economic Studies of Moldova
- Occupation: Economist • Politician

Ion Chicu (Romanian: [ˈkiku]; born 28 February 1972) is a Moldovan economist and politician who served as Prime Minister of Moldova between 2019 until his resignation in 2020.

== Biography ==
He was born on 28 February 1972 in the village of Pîrjolteni, located in the Moldovan Călărași District. He graduated from the Faculty of Management at the Academy of Economic Studies of Moldova. Ion Chicu ran for parliamentary elections in 1998 on the list of the Reform Party, of unionist orientation, led by Mihai Ghimpu. In 2005, he worked as director of the General Directorate of Structural Reforms of the Ministry of Economy and Trade. In the mid-late 2000s, he was the Deputy Minister of Finance of Moldova. From April 2008 to September 2009, he was the chief state adviser to Prime Minister Vasile Tarlev on economic issues and external relations. He also served as chairman of the Strategic Development Council of the Nicolae Testemițanu State University of Medicine and Pharmacy, worked as a consultant on public finance management in various projects. In January 2018, he was appointed Secretary General of the Ministry of Finance and in December of that year he became the Minister of Finance, succeeding Octavian Armașu. He resigned from this post during the 2019 Moldovan constitutional crisis which brought down the Filip Cabinet.

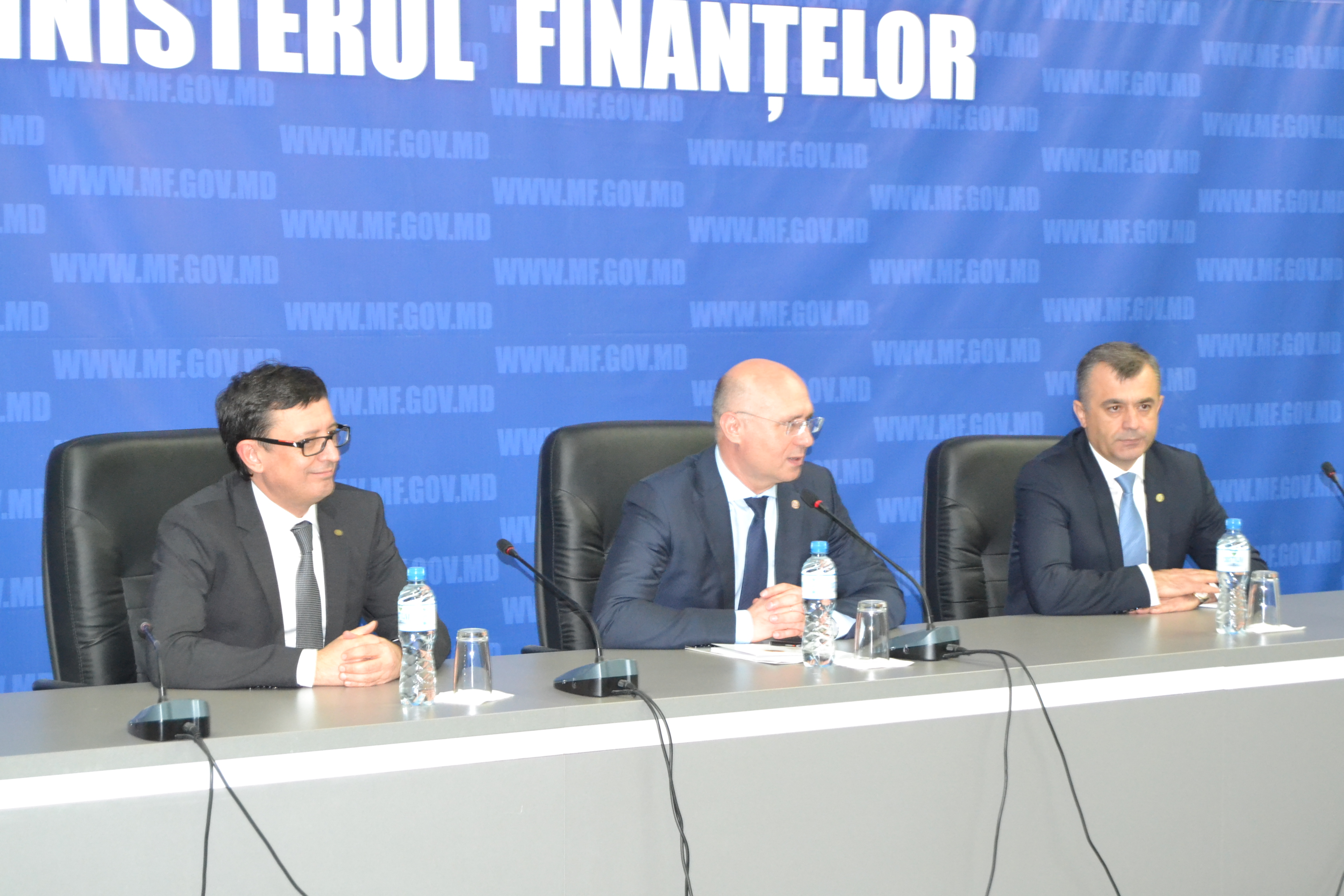
Chicu with NBM governor Octavian Armașu (left) and prime minister Pavel Filip, 10 December 2018

After his term as prime minister ended, he subsequently founded his own political party in 2021, more specifically the Party of Development and Consolidation of Moldova, with a stated pro-European ideology. He failed to obtain any seats in the 11th legislature of the Moldovan Parliament in the 2021 Moldovan parliamentary election.

== Premiership (2019–2020) ==
On 14 November 2019, the government of Prime Minister Maia Sandu was defeated in a vote of no confidence after attempts to pass bills to change the judicial system. With the support of just over 60% of MPs, Chicu was approved as a replacement prime minister. The same day he announced that his government would "fulfill all obligations of the state to external partners and international financial organizations, primarily the International Monetary Fund and the World Bank". At the time of his appointment, he was described by President Igor Dodon as "a technocrat, a professional who has not been in any political party", although Chicu did serve as an advisor to President Dodon. The day after, he was introduced to a new Cabinet of Ministers by President Dodon, which included Victor Gaiciuc as defense minister and Pavel Voicu as interior minister. On 20 November, he went to Moscow on his first working visit, where he held talks with Prime Minister Dmitry Medvedev.

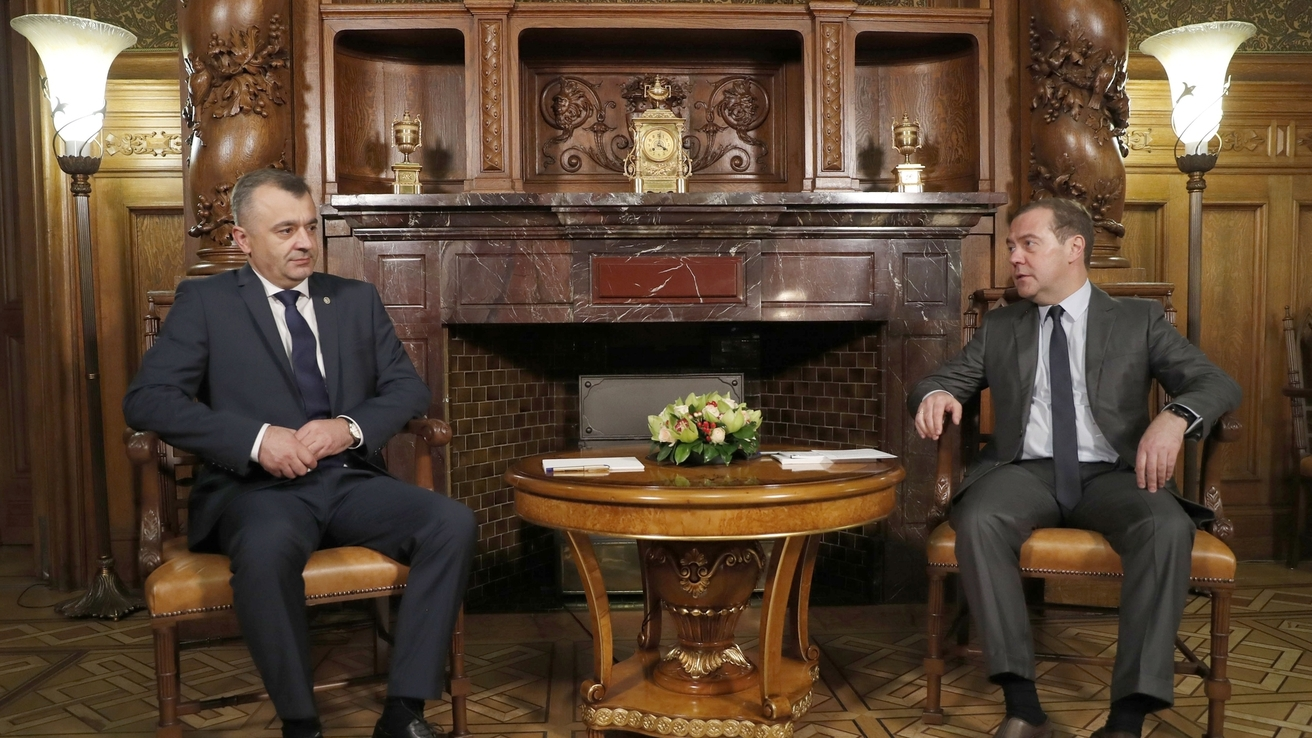
Chicu with Dmitry Medvedev, prime minister of Russia, in Moscow on 20 November 2019

In May 2020, during a Facebook fight with Romanian MEP Siegfried Mureșan, he declared Romania to be the most corrupt country in Europe. Mureșan responded by criticizing the Moldovan government for not implementing reforms or fighting corruption. Chicu's words caused controversy in Romania. In fact, Moldovan-born Romanian deputy Constantin Codreanu requested the withdrawal of Chicu's Romanian citizenship. Other Romanian authorities also criticized his words. However, collaboration during the COVID-19 pandemic continued between the two countries. Chicu would later apologize during a meeting with the Romanian ambassador in Moldova Daniel Ioniță, reiterating his thanks to the country for its help to Moldova during the pandemic. He tested positive for COVID-19 on 9 December 2020. In May 2020, when Romania sent more medical aid to the Republic of Moldova, the government led by Ion Chicu decided that they should not be taken over by Moldovan authorities in the centre of Chisinau, but under a bridge on the outskirts of the city. Although Chicu publicly thanked Romania for this help, he was booed at the event, and several representatives from civil society and NGOs suggested that the government led by Ion Chicu intentionally decided that the aid should be taken to the outskirts of Chisinau, in order to diminish the importance of the event.

Chicu and his government resigned as Prime Minister on 23 December 2020 amid protests demanding early parliamentary elections. He initially continued as acting prime minister but refused to stay on until a new government was formed, and was replaced by Aureliu Ciocoi on 31 December 2020.

== Politics after premiership ==
On 31 March 2021, the Party of Development and Consolidation of Moldova (PDCM) was founded by Chicu; it was officially registered on 17 April of that year.

=== 2024 presidential campaign ===
On 22 September 2024 Chicu registered for the 2024 Moldovan presidential election, and officially announced his candidacy the following day. Chicu pledged to be the "President of all Moldovans" and in his announcement speech said "With the will of God and the support of over 27,000 fellow citizens who put their trust in us signing for my nomination, I am committed to fighting for a better future for Moldova."

He said in his announcement speech that he wouldn't have launched the campaign if not for pressure from the leadership of the PDCM. He also centered his campaign around improving the demographic situation, ensuring decent pensions and social allowances, developing the national economy and ensuring access to quality healthcare services. Chicu stated that as President he would be committed to European integration, as that reflects "the national interest." However, he also said he would implement "democratic and transparent regulations on the activity of non-governmental organizations."

Despite his support for European integration Chicu stated he was opposed to the EU membership constitutional referendum claiming it would be “dangerous” for Moldova’s statehood and that the referendum is just an attempt by incumbent President Maia Sandu to bolster her support for a second term.

Chicu would lose in the first round, earning 31,785 votes or 2.06% of the electorate.

== Private life ==
He is married with three children.

== See also ==
- List of international prime ministerial trips made by Ion Chicu
