= Alexandru Pînzari =

Moldovan politician (born 1973)

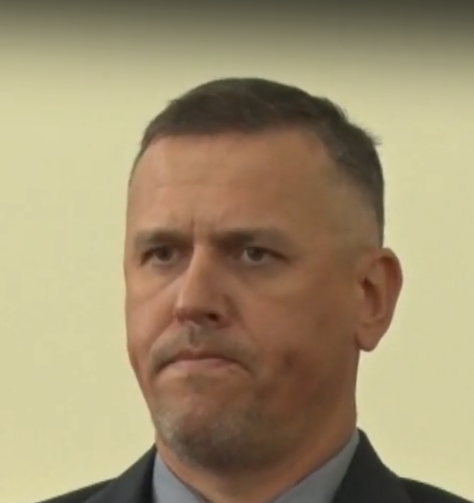
- Pînzari in 2020

Minister of Defense
- In office 16 March 2020 – 9 November 2020
- President: Igor Dodon
- Prime Minister: Ion Chicu
- Preceded by: Victor Gaiciuc
- Succeeded by: Victor Gaiciuc

Chief of the General Police Inspectorate
- In office 30 March 2016 – 10 June 2019
- Succeeded by: Gheorghe Balan (acting)

Personal details
- Born: 3 January 1973 (age 53) Căușeni, Moldavian SSR, Soviet Union
- Profession: Policeman

Alexandru Pînzari (born 3 January 1973) is a Moldovan policeman and politician. He served as Minister of Defense of Moldova from March–November 2020. Prior to his appointment, he served as the head of the General Police Inspectorate for four years. His career began as an inspector for the Judicial Police of the Buiucani Police Inspectorate in 1998. He speaks English and Russian as well as Romanian. He is a graduate of the Odesa Maritime Academy in Ukraine (1988–1992) and the Ștefan cel Mare Police Academy (1992–1997).

On 19 January 2026, Pinzari was sentenced to three years in prison for abuse of power and forgery in a case dealing with fictitious employees at the Ministry of Internal Affairs. Moldovan oligarch and politician Vladimir Plahotniuc's godson Dorin Damir and former head of a department within the police's National Inspectorate of Investigations (INI) Valeriu Cojocaru received the same sentence. The three were sentenced with deductions totalling a sum of 170,000 lei from their bank accounts as damages to be paid to the police, and were acquitted of three other charges. Pinzari did not appear for the reading of the sentence, and his whereabouts became unknown afterwards, with the internal affairs minister Daniella Misail-Nichitin stating that the authorities did not rule out that Pinzari could have left Moldova through the unrecognized breakaway region of Transnistria. She also stated that a request to search for him and Cojocaru had been sent to Interpol; Damir had been retained shortly after his sentencing.
