= Andrian Gavriliță =

Moldovan economist (born 1986)

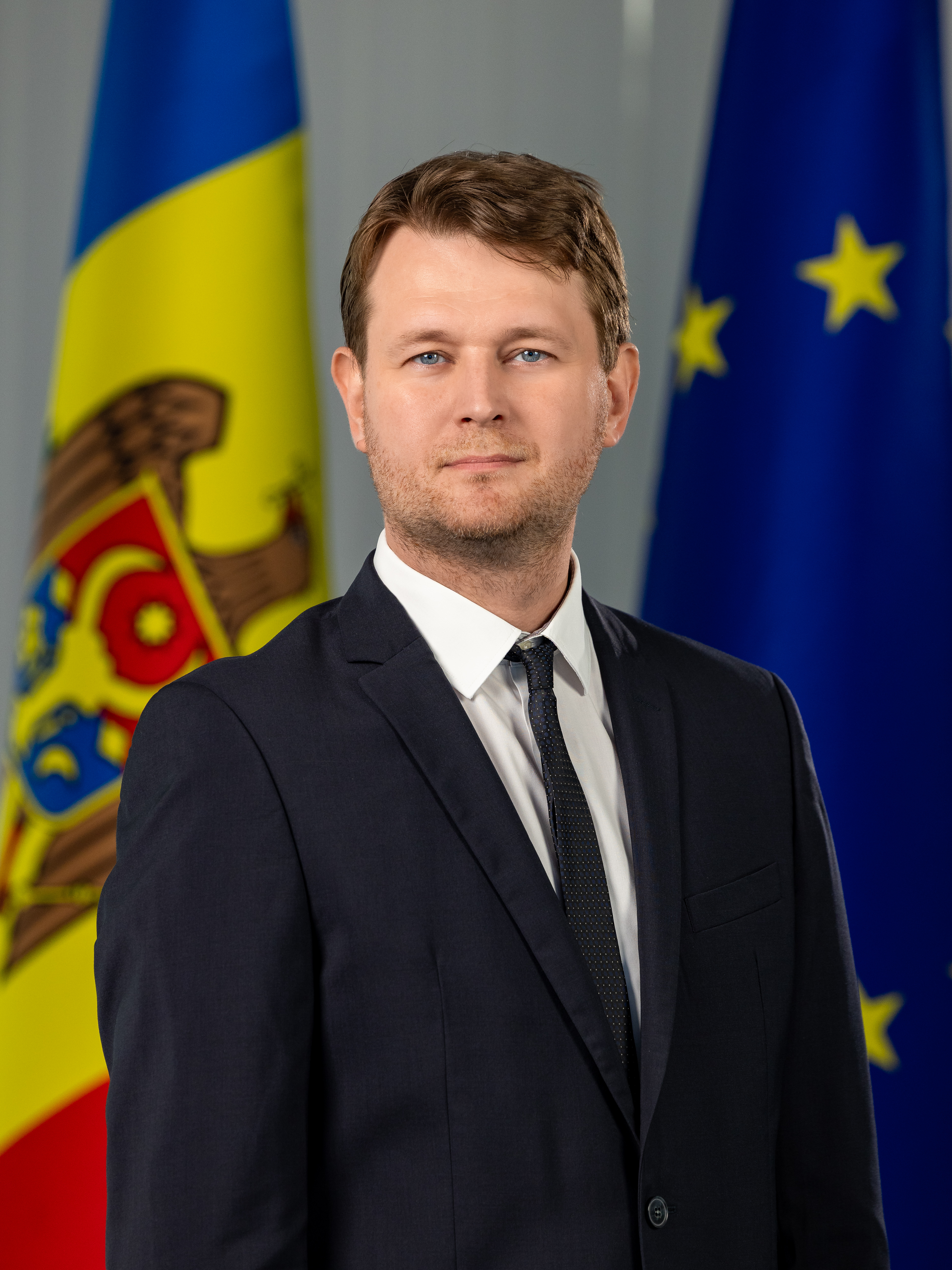
- Official portrait, 2025

Minister of Finance
- In office 1 November 2025 – 22 July 2026
- President: Maia Sandu
- Prime Minister: Alexandru Munteanu; Eugen Osmochescu (acting)
- Preceded by: Victoria Belous
- Succeeded by: Victoria Belous

Personal details
- Born: 11 January 1986 (age 40) Moldavian SSR, Soviet Union
- Education: Academy of Economic Studies of Moldova; European School of Management and Technology

Andrian Gavriliță (born 11 January 1986) is a Moldovan economist who served as Minister of Finance of Moldova in the Munteanu Cabinet.
