= Union of Officers of Moldova =

- Romanian: Uniunea ofițerilor din Moldova; Russian: Союз офицеров Молдовы
- Founded: 24 July 1999
- Headquarters: Ștefan cel Mare Avenue, Chișinău
- Key people: Brigader General Victor Gaiciuc; Major General Gennady Kondratenko (co-chair); President Igor Dodon (supporter of the union)
- Affiliations: Armed Forces of the Republic of Moldova
- Website: www.ofiterii.md

The Union of Officers of Moldova (Romanian: Uniunea ofițerilor din Moldova, Russian: Союз офицеров Молдовы) or SОRМ is a Moldovan non-governmental organisation based in the Moldovan capital of Chișinău. It serves as an organization that honours Soviet/Moldovan veterans of war, as well as a proponent of Soviet Army culture in the Moldovan National Army. Former Moldovan defense minister Victor Gaiciuc is the chair of the Union of Officers of Moldova, with Major General Gennady Kondratenko acting as co-chair.

The history of SORМ goes back to April 1998, when reserve officers from Russia, Belarus and Ukraine created the International Union of Soviet Officers, who appealed the veterans of former Soviet military units who reside in Former Soviet Republics, which includes Moldova. For the very purpose of joining the international organization, Moldovan veterans convened to create the Union of Officers of the Republic of Moldova. It originally consisted of 35 veterans who resided in the capital of Chișinău. On July 24, 1999, in what would be considered as the foundation of the SORM, a summit of the union of officers was held, in which the objectives, leadership, and activities of the organization were confirmed. In early October of that same year, the SORM was registered by the Ministry of Justice as an official organization. The organization commonly organizes concerts dedicated to Victory Day, as well as anniversaries in honor of the liberation of Moldova, and days of Afghan War veterans, among other
