= Mariana Durleșteanu =

Moldovan politician and economist

President of the Party of Law and Justice
- In office 11 August 2021 – 20 May 2022
- Preceded by: Nicolae Alexei

Minister of Finance
- In office 31 March 2008 – 14 September 2009
- President: Vladimir Voronin; Mihai Ghimpu (acting)
- Prime Minister: Zinaida Greceanîi
- Preceded by: Mihail Pop
- Succeeded by: Veaceslav Negruța

Moldovan Ambassador to the United Kingdom and the Republic of Ireland
- In office 16 November 2004 – 8 April 2008
- President: Vladimir Voronin
- Prime Minister: Vasile Tarlev; Zinaida Greceanîi
- Preceded by: Mihai Popov
- Succeeded by: Natalia Solcan

First Deputy Minister of Finance
- In office 11 April 2002 – 29 December 2004
- President: Vladimir Voronin
- Prime Minister: Vasile Tarlev
- Minister: Zinaida Greceanîi

Deputy Minister of Finance
- In office 19 July 2001 – 11 April 2002
- President: Vladimir Voronin
- Prime Minister: Vasile Tarlev
- Minister: Mihail Manoli; Zinaida Greceanîi

Personal details
- Born: 5 September 1971 (age 55) Chișinău, Moldavian SSR, Soviet Union
- Education: Moldova State University; Babeș-Bolyai University; University of Westminster
- Profession: Finance, Banking and Economics

Mariana Durleșteanu (born 5 September 1971) is a Moldovan politician and economist who was Ambassador of Moldova to the United Kingdom from 2005 until 2008.

Durleșteanu was Minister of Finance in the Moldovan Government from 2008 until the change of government in 2009.

== Honours ==
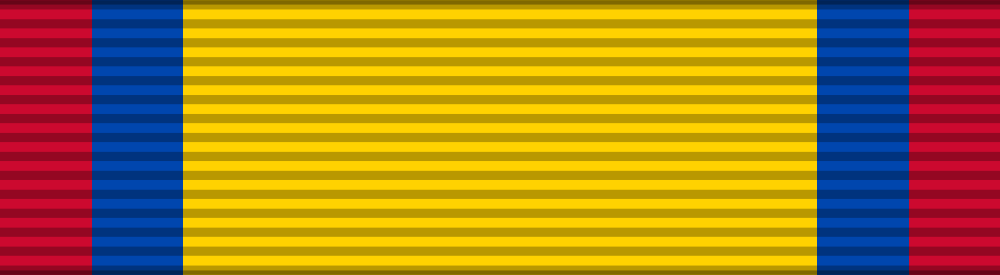
- Member, Order of Work Glory (2002)

== See also ==
- Politics of Moldova
