= Konstantin Pogreban =

Russian footballer

Personal information
- Full name: Konstantin Fyodorovich Pogreban
- Date of birth: 6 July 1987 (age 39)
- Place of birth: Delacău, Moldavian SSR, Soviet Union (now Moldova)
- Height: 1.72 m (5 ft 8 in)
- Position: Midfielder

Youth career
- FC Dynamo Barnaul

Senior career*
Years	Team	Apps	(Gls)
2005	FC Dynamo Barnaul	0	(0)
2005	FC Shakhtyor Prokopyevsk	16	(0)
2006–2009	FC Dynamo Barnaul	100	(14)
2010	FC Dynamo Biysk		
2010	FC Metallurg-Kuzbass Novokuznetsk	11	(1)
2012–2013	FC Dynamo Barnaul	12	(1)
2014–2019	FC Dynamo Barnaul	96	(7)
- * Club domestic league appearances and goals

Konstantin Fyodorovich Pogreban (Russian: Константин Фёдорович Погребан; born 6 July 1987) is a Moldovan-born Russian former professional football player.

== Club career ==
He made his Russian Football National League debut for FC Dynamo Barnaul on 27 March 2008 in a game against FC Ural Yekaterinburg.
