= Veaceslav Negruța =

Moldovan economist and politician (born 1972)

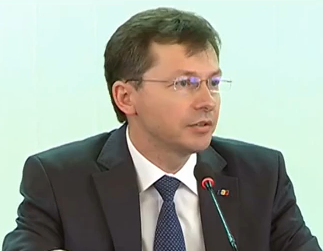
- Negruța in 2015

Economic Advisor to the President
- In office 10 January 2023 – 29 April 2024
- President: Maia Sandu
- In office 24 December 2020 – 10 January 2023
- President: Maia Sandu
- Preceded by: Elena Gorelova

Secretary General of the Office of the President of Moldova
- In office 10 January 2023 – 14 February 2023
- President: Maia Sandu
- Preceded by: Cristina Gherasimov
- Succeeded by: Andrei Spînu

Minister of Finance
- In office 25 September 2009 – 14 August 2013
- President: Mihai Ghimpu (acting); Vlad Filat (acting); Marian Lupu (acting); Nicolae Timofti
- Prime Minister: Vlad Filat; Iurie Leancă
- Preceded by: Mariana Durleșteanu
- Succeeded by: Anatol Arapu

Personal details
- Born: 4 March 1972 (age 54) Delacău, Moldavian SSR, Soviet Union
- Party: Liberal Democratic Party (2007-2013)
- Other political affiliations: Alliance for European Integration (2009–2013)
- Education: Academy of Economic Studies of Moldova

Veaceslav Negruța (born 4 March 1972) is a Moldovan economist. He was the Minister of Finance (2009-2013) in the First Vlad Filat Cabinet and in the Second Filat Cabinet, and in the Leancă Cabinet as well.

== Biography ==
Veaceslav Negruța was born on 4 March 1972, in Delacău, in the Grigoriopol District of the Moldovan SSR. He was a member of the Liberal Democratic Party of Moldova.

Political offices
| Preceded by Mariana Durleșteanu | Minister of Finance; 2009–2013 | Succeeded by Anatol Arapu |
