= Petru Rotaru =

Romanian economist, born in Moldova 1984)

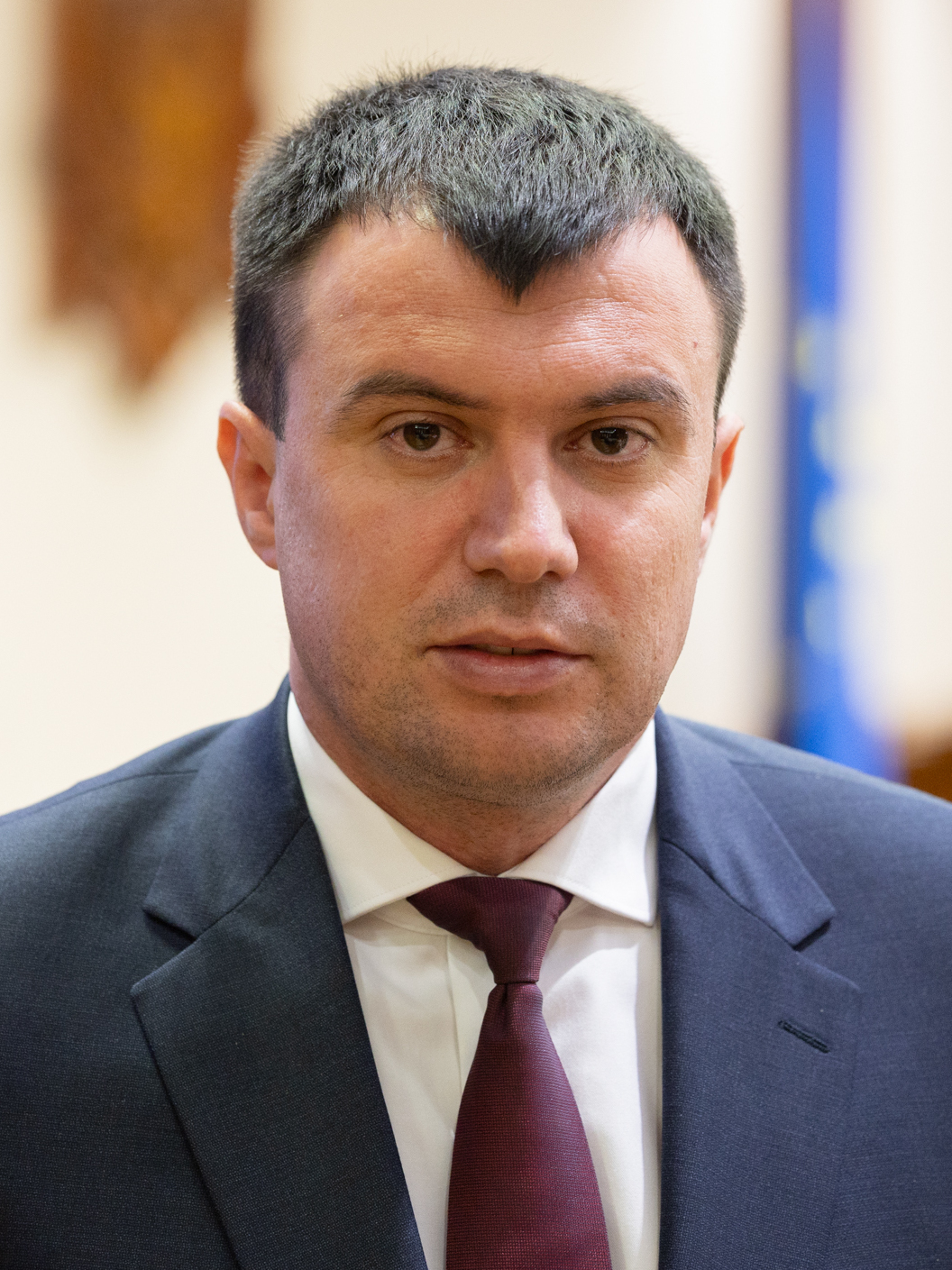
- Rotaru in 2024

Minister of Finance
- In office 28 September 2023 – 31 July 2024
- President: Maia Sandu
- Prime Minister: Dorin Recean
- Preceded by: Veronica Sirețeanu
- Succeeded by: Victoria Belous

Mayor of Țipala
- In office 14 June 2015 – 29 July 2016
- Succeeded by: Ilie Castraveț

Personal details
- Born: 8 July 1984 (age 42) Țipala, Moldavian SSR, Soviet Union
- Education: Academy of Economic Studies of Moldova

Petru Rotaru (born 8 July 1984) is a Moldovan economist. In 2023, he served as Director of the State Tax Service. He was appointed as Minister of Finance of Moldova on 28 September 2023, and served in this position until 31 July 2024.
