= Anatol Arapu =

Moldovan economist and politician

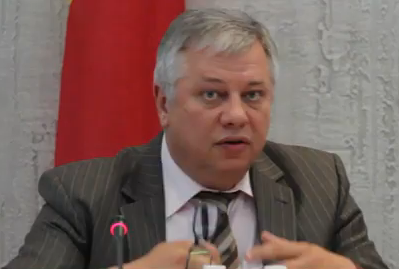
- Arapu in 2015

Minister of Finance
- In office 14 August 2013 – 20 January 2016
- President: Nicolae Timofti
- Prime Minister: Iurie Leancă; Chiril Gaburici; Natalia Gherman (acting); Valeriu Streleț; Gheorghe Brega (acting)
- Preceded by: Veaceslav Negruța
- Succeeded by: Octavian Armașu
- In office 22 May 1998 – 12 November 1999
- President: Petru Lucinschi
- Prime Minister: Ion Ciubuc; Ion Sturza
- Preceded by: Valeriu Chițan
- Succeeded by: Mihail Manoli

Moldovan Ambassador to Belgium, the Netherlands, Luxembourg and NATO
- In office 21 July 1997 – 1 July 1998
- President: Petru Lucinschi
- Prime Minister: Ion Ciubuc
- Preceded by: Tudor Botnaru
- Succeeded by: Ion Căpățină

Personal details
- Born: 27 November 1962 (age 63) Văsieni, Moldavian SSR, Soviet Union
- Education: Moldova State University; Moscow State University of Economics, Statistics, and Informatics
- Occupation: Economist

Anatol Arapu (born 27 November 1962) is a Moldovan economist, who served as Minister of Finances of Moldova from 14 August 2013 to January 2016, in three consecutive cabinets: Leancă Cabinet, Gaburici Cabinet, and Streleț Cabinet. He also was Minister of Finances in the 1990s, in Ciubuc-2 Cabinet (22 May 1998 - 17 February 1999) and in Sturza Cabinet (12 March - 12 November 1999).

== Biography ==
Anatol Arapu was born on 27 November 1962 in the village of Văsieni, Ialoveni. He graduated from the Faculty of Economics of the State University of Moldova in 1985, the Economic and Statistical Institute of Moscow in 1987 and the Institute of the World Trade Organization in Geneva, Switzerland in 1993. In the period 1988-1992 he was director of the "Moldova - EXIM" trust. During 1994-1997 he worked as an assistant to the World Bank executive direction, and from 1997 to 1998 he was Ambassador of the Republic of Moldova to the European Union, NATO, Belgium, the Netherlands, and Luxembourg.

He subsequently worked for Lukoil România as a financial director for one year, and from 2001 to 2013 he served as Deputy General Manager for Economic and Financial Affairs. On 14 August 2013, Arapu became the Minister of Finance of the Republic of Moldova initially in the Leancă Cabinet, then in the Gaburici Cabinet and the Streleț Cabinet. Although he was not a party member, he became minister as being submitted by the Liberal Democratic Party of Moldova. He served as finance minister until 20 January 2016 when he was succeeded by Octavian Armașu.

He is married and has a child. He speaks Romanian (native), Russian (fluent), English (fluent) and French (medium).
