= List of international prime ministerial trips made by Ion Chicu =

This is a list of international trips made by Ion Chicu, the Prime Minister of Moldova (14 November 2019 – 31 December 2020).

During his term in office, he made:

- One visit to Russia, United Kingdom, Ukraine, France, Italy, Turkey, Poland, Kazakhstan and Belarus.

== 2019 ==
#	Country	Location	Date	Details
1	Russia	Moscow	20 November	Met with: Dmitry Medvedev – Prime Minister of Russia; Alexey Miller – CEO of Gazprom
2	United Kingdom	London	22–23 November	Participated in the Eastern Partnership Investment Summit. Met with: Ali Asadov – Prime Minister of Azerbaijan; Syarhey Rumas – Prime Minister of Belarus; Oleksiy Honcharuk – Prime Minister of Ukraine; Suma Chakrabarti – President of the European Bank of Reconstruction and Development
3	Ukraine	Kyiv	12 December	Met with: Volodymyr Zelenskyy – President of Ukraine; Oleksiy Honcharuk – Prime Minister of Ukraine
4	France	Strasbourg	16 December	Met with: Marija Pejčinović Burić – Secretary General of the Council of Europe; Linos-Alexandre Sicilianos – President of the European Court of Human Rights
5	Italy	Rome	19 December	Attended the Central European Initiative Summit. Met with: Giuseppe Conte – Prime Minister of Italy; Andrej Plenković – Prime Minister of Croatia; Ana Brnabić – Prime Minister of Serbia; Olivér Várhelyi – European Commissioner for Neighbourhood and Enlargement; Qu Dongyu – Director-General of the Food and Agriculture Organization
6	Turkey	Ankara	30 December	Met with: Mustafa Şentop – Speaker of the Grand National Assembly

== 2020 ==
#	Country	Location	Date	Details
7	Poland	Brzezinka	27 January	Attended the event commemorating the 75th Anniversary of the Liberation of Auschwitz.
8	Kazakhstan	Almaty	30–31 January	Met with: Asqar Mamin – Prime Minister of Kazakhstan; Mikhail Mishustin – Prime Minister of Russia; Nikol Pashinyan – Prime Minister of Armenia; Syarhey Rumas – Prime Minister of Belarus; Mukhammedkalyi Abylgaziev – Prime Minister of Kyrgyzstan
9	Belarus	Minsk	17 July	Met with: Roman Golovchenko – Prime Minister of Belarus; Mikhail Mishustin – Prime Minister of Russia; Asqar Mamin – Prime Minister of Kazakhstan
