= Olga Cebotari =

Moldovan politician and diplomat (born 1992)

Olga Cebotari MP
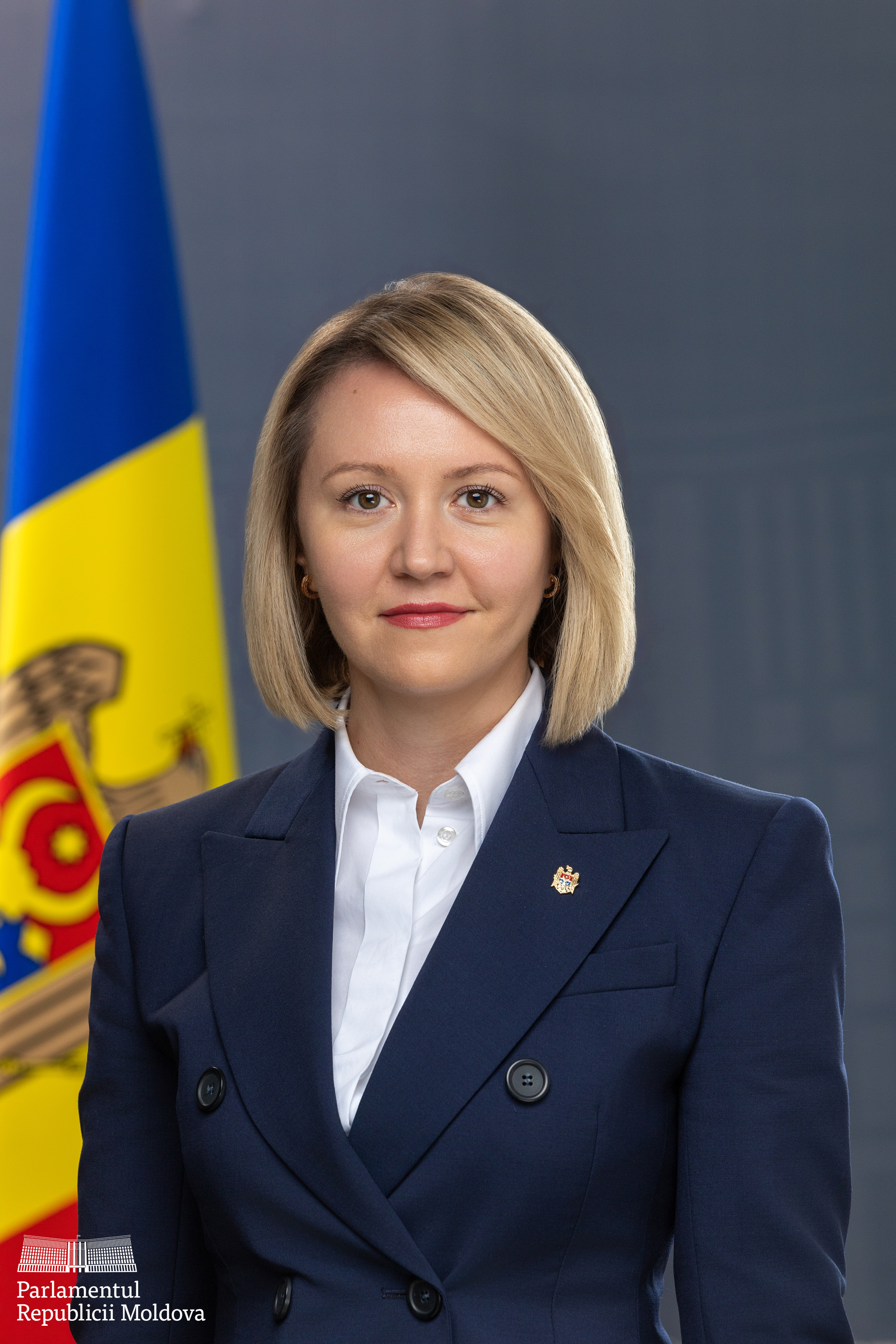
- Official portrait, 2025

Member of the Moldovan Parliament
- Incumbent
- Assumed office 22 October 2025
- Parliamentary group: Party of Socialists

Deputy Prime Minister of Moldova for Reintegration
- In office 9 November 2020 – 6 August 2021
- President: Igor Dodon; Maia Sandu
- Prime Minister: Ion Chicu; Aureliu Ciocoi (acting)
- Preceded by: Cristina Lesnic
- Succeeded by: Vladislav Kulminski

Personal details
- Born: 4 January 1992 (age 34) Chișinău, Moldova
- Party: Party of Socialists of the Republic of Moldova
- Education: Peoples' Friendship University of Russia; Moscow State Institute of International Relations
- Profession: Politician, diplomat

Olga Cebotari (born 4 January 1992) is a Moldovan politician and diplomat. She served as Deputy Prime Minister for Reintegration of the Republic of Moldova in the Chicu Cabinet.

== Career ==
Olga Cebotari was born on 4 January 1992 in Chișinău. She studied International Relations at the Russian University of Friendship of Peoples, Faculty of "Human and Social Sciences", Moscow, Russian Federation (from 2010 to 2014). In 2016, Cebotari graduated her master's degree in world politics at the diplomatic Academy of the Ministry of Foreign Affairs of the Russian Federation, Moscow, Faculty of 'International relations and International Law'. In 2020, she completed her doctoral studies at the diplomatic Academy of the Ministry of Foreign Affairs of the Russian Federation, the specialty "political issues in International relations, Global and Regional Development".

From 2017 to 2019, Olga Cebotari was director of the "Center for support of Moldavian Youth" in Moscow, the Russian Federation. Since 1 February 2020 she has been appointed deputy director of the Economic Department, Executive Committee in the Commonwealth of Independent States. On 9 November 2020, she became Deputy Prime Minister for Reintegration of Moldova and served his position until 5 August 2021. On December 31, when Prime-minister Ion Chicu resigned, he recommended Cebotari to be the acting Prime-minister. However, the president Maia Sandu chose Aureliu Ciocoi to become the acting Prime-minister.

On 31 January 2022, Cebotari was elected by the Republican Council of the Party of Socialists of the Republic of Moldova (PSRM) as a member of the new governing body of the party.

== Personal life ==
Olga Cebotari is married to Romanian businessman Octavian Popa. She speaks Romanian, Russian, Spanish and English. She also holds Russian citizenship.
