= Vasilii Șova =

Moldovean politician and diplomat (born 1959)

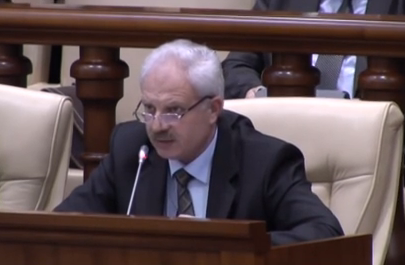
- Șova in 2014

Reintegration Advisor to the President
- In office 15 November 2019 – 24 December 2020
- President: Igor Dodon
- In office 26 December 2016 – 8 June 2019
- President: Igor Dodon
- Preceded by: Vasile Sturza

Deputy Prime Minister of Moldova for Reintegration
- In office 8 June 2019 – 14 November 2019
- President: Igor Dodon
- Prime Minister: Maia Sandu
- Preceded by: Cristina Lesnic
- Succeeded by: Alexandru Flenchea

Member of the Moldovan Parliament
- In office 14 August 2009 – 9 December 2014
- Parliamentary group: Party of Communists
- In office 17 April 1990 – 27 February 1994
- Constituency: Chișinău

Minister of Reintegration
- In office 12 December 2002 – 11 September 2009
- President: Vladimir Voronin
- Prime Minister: Vasile Tarlev; Zinaida Greceanîi

1st Moldovan Ambassador to China
- In office 27 August 1998 – 17 October 2002
- President: Petru Lucinschi; Vladimir Voronin
- Prime Minister: Ion Ciubuc; Ion Sturza; Dumitru Braghiș; Vasile Tarlev
- Succeeded by: Victor Borșevici

Deputy Minister of Foreign Affairs
- In office 1 December 1995 – 12 June 1998
- President: Mircea Snegur; Petru Lucinschi
- Prime Minister: Andrei Sangheli; Ion Ciubuc
- Minister: Mihai Popov; Nicolae Tăbăcaru

Personal details
- Born: July 18, 1959 (age 66) Crasnoarmeiscoe, Moldavian SSR, Soviet Union

Vasilii Șova (born 18 July 1959) is a Moldovan politician and diplomat. He has served as Deputy Prime Minister of Moldova for Reintegration in the Sandu Cabinet and has held other political offices in since the 1990s.
