= Victoria Belous =

Moldovan jurist and politician (born 1984)

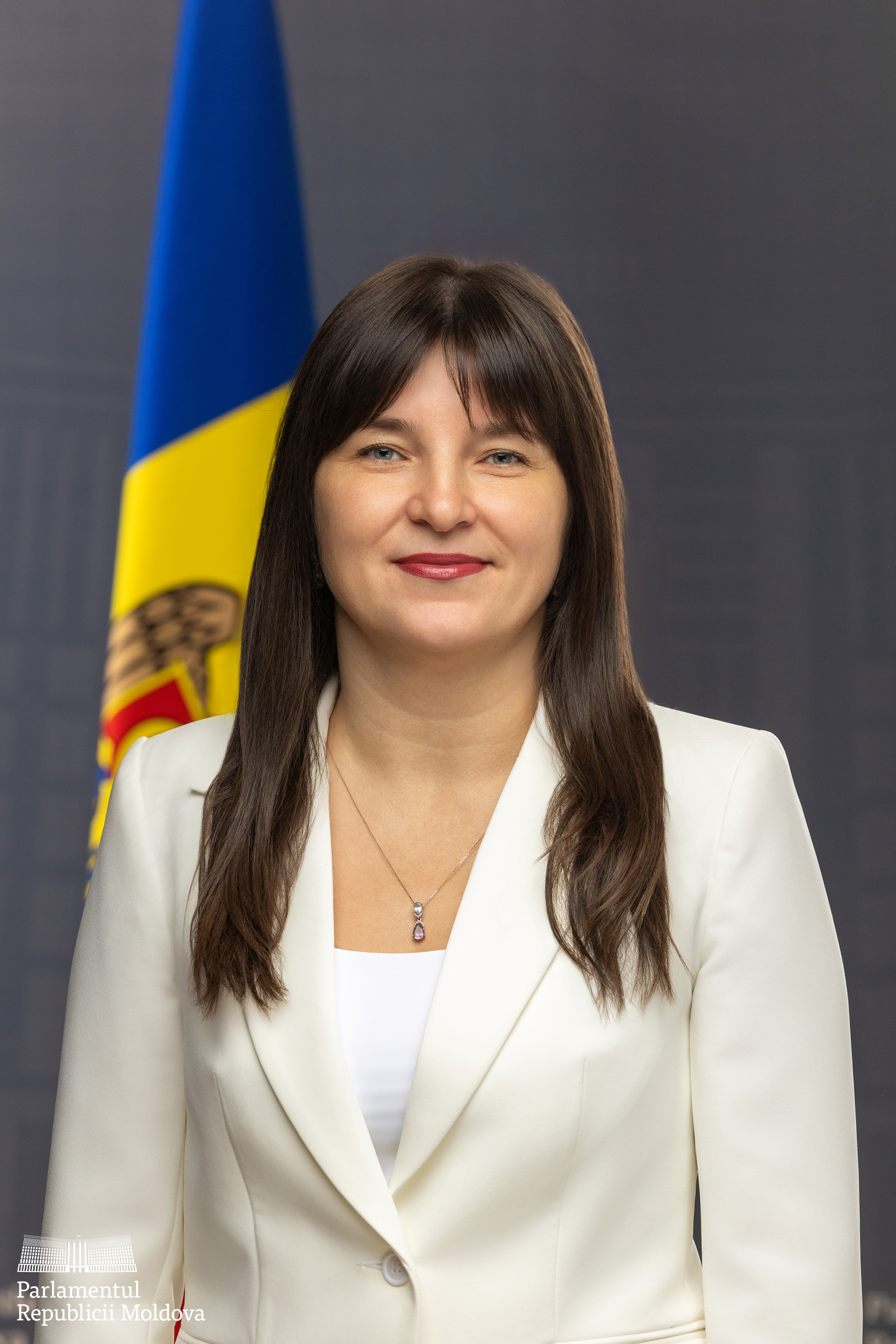
- Official portrait, 2025

Minister of Finance
- Incumbent
- Assumed office 22 July 2026
- President: Maia Sandu
- Prime Minister: Vasile Tofan
- Preceded by: Andrian Gavriliță
- In office 31 July 2024 – 1 November 2025
- President: Maia Sandu
- Prime Minister: Dorin Recean
- Preceded by: Petru Rotaru
- Succeeded by: Andrian Gavriliță

Member of the Moldovan Parliament
- In office 22 October 2025 – 31 July 2026
- Succeeded by: Victor Mătrăgună
- Parliamentary group: Party of Action and Solidarity

Personal details
- Born: 9 May 1984 (age 42)
- Education: Moldova State University; Academy of Public Administration of Moldova

Victoria Belous (born 9 May 1984) is a Moldovan politician. She is the current Minister of Finance of Moldova since 22 July 2026.

== Career ==
Between 2009 and 2024, she served in various roles at the State Tax Service.

She was appointed as Minister of Finance of Moldova on 31 July 2024.
