= Valeriu Chițan =

Moldovan economist and politician (born 1955)

Valeriu Chițan OR
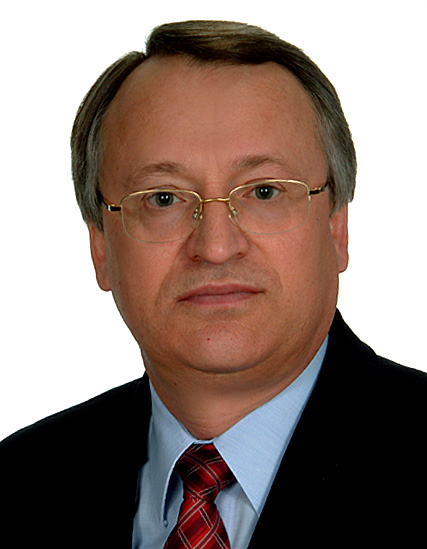

Minister of Finance
- In office 5 April 1994 – 22 May 1998
- President: Mircea Snegur; Petru Lucinschi
- Prime Minister: Andrei Sangheli; Ion Ciubuc
- Preceded by: Claudia Melnic
- Succeeded by: Anatol Arapu

Personal details
- Born: 1 June 1955 (age 71) Fîntînița, Moldavian SSR, Soviet Union
- Spouse: Elena Chitan
- Parent(s): Sergiu and Alexandra Chitan

Valeriu Chițan is a Moldovan economist and technocrat with a long career in public service. He started out as an economist at the district level, gaining hands-on experience with local public finances, and steadily rose to senior leadership roles in the field of public finance. From 1994 to 1998, he served as Minister of Finance of the Republic of Moldova, coordinating country’s fiscal and budget policies during a challenging period of transition from a centrally planned system to a market-based economy.

== Education ==
- Technical University of the Republic of Moldova, Faculty of Economics, Department of Finance and Credit (1976);
- Master of Business Administration (MBA), School of Management, Bled, Slovenia (2002).
- State University of Economics and Finance, Sankt-Petersburg (1980)
- Joint Vienna Institute IMF (1992-1996).

== Professional career ==
V. Chitan began his professional career in 1976 as an economist at the Dondușeni District Financial Authority. He was later promoted to Head of the Revenue Inspection and subsequently to Head of the Budget Inspection within the same institution. Between 1984 and 1987, he served as Head of the Dondușeni District Financial Authority and was also a member of the district Executive Committee.

After gaining solid experience at the district level, Valeriu Chițan was appointed to the Ministry of Finance in 1987, marking the beginning of his work at the national level. This period coincided with the start of democratization and economic liberalization, as well as the launch of structural reforms required for the transition to a market economy. Over the years, he held a number of senior positions in the Ministry, including head of territorial finance directorates, head of subsidies and social standards, head of the Budget Department, deputy minister, and first deputy minister in three governments.

As Minister of Finance - a position he held in two governments between 1994 and 1998 - V. Chițan played a key role in building the legal and institutional framework of the fiscal and budgetary system. During this term, legislation on the budget process and public debt was adopted, along with the Tax Code and the National Accounting Standards. The public treasury system was established, the government securities market was created, and the country successfully carried out its first (and only) sovereign transaction on the international capital market.

As President of the Council of Creditors (a position held ex officio as minister), V. Chițan coordinated a large-scale program to restructure and financially stabilize the real sector of the economy. This nationally important effort helped overcome the non-payment crisis and created conditions for attracting investment into industry.

During his ministerial terms, he represented the Government of the Republic of Moldova in several international bodies, including as:

- Member of the National Bank of Moldova Administrative Board (1992-1994);
- Deputy Governor of the IMF Board of Governors on behalf of the Republic of Moldova (1992-1994);
- Governor of the World Bank Board of Governors on behalf of the Republic of Moldova (1994-1998)

Between 1998 and 2003, as President of the Association of Banks of Moldova, he led legislative and regulatory initiatives aimed at strengthening the banking sector.

While serving at the Court of Accounts from 2011 to 2016, V. Chițan contributed to identifying institutional weaknesses and ongoing risks in the public sector and helped develop solutions to address them. He is also a co-author of Law No. 260/2017 on the organization and functioning of the Court of Accounts of the Republic of Moldova.

As President of the National Commission for Financial Markets (NCFM) from 2017 to 2021, he promoted the modernization of the non-banking financial market, introducing—for the first time—prudential supervision tools in the insurance and microcredit sectors. Under his leadership, the NCFM strengthened its management, autonomy, and financial sustainability.

== Decorations ==
For his professional achievements, V. Chițan was awarded the Order of Labor, the Order of Honor, and the Order of the Republic.
