= Țipala =

- Commune
- Location within Moldova
- Coordinates: 46°49′40″N 28°58′31″E
- Country: Moldova
- District: Ialoveni District

Government
  - Mayor: Petru Rotaru (n. 1984) (PL)

Population (2014)
  - Total: 4,280
- Time zone: UTC+2 (EET)
  - Summer (DST): UTC+3 (EEST)
- Postal code: MD-6828

Țipala is a commune in Ialoveni District, Moldova, composed of three villages: Bălțați, Budăi and Țipala.

According to the 2004 census, the entire population of the commune is 4,295 inhabitants, including 3,609 in the village of Țipala, 442 in Bălțați, and 244 in Budăi. 4,267 inhabitants are Romanians, 7 are Ukrainians, 9 Russians, 2 Bulgarians, 6 Gypsies, and 4 others.

At the 1930 census, there were 1,791 inhabitants in Țipala (1,782 Romanians and 9 Russians), 146 in Bălțați (all Romanians), and 107 in Budăi (then Budei; 104 Romanians and 3 Russians). At the time these villages belonged to Plasa Hâncești of Lăpușna County.

== Notable people ==
- Petru Rotaru (born 1984), economist
