= Valea Mare, Ungheni =

Valea Mare
- Commune
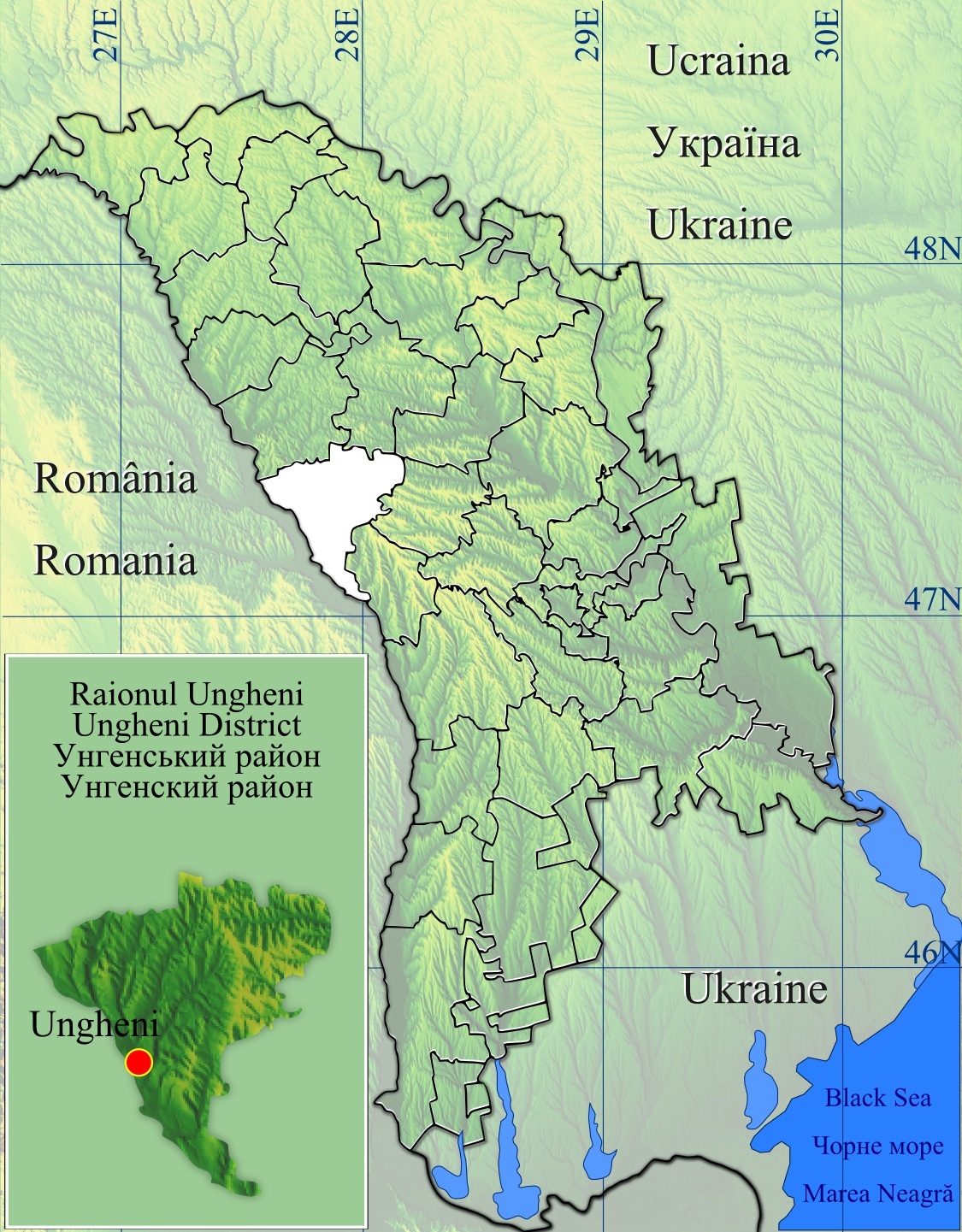
- Location within Ungheni
- Coordinates: 47°7′56″N 27°51′51″E
- Country: Moldova
- District: Ungheni District

Government
  - Mayor: Varvariuc Galina, 2007

Population (2014)
  - Total: 3,032
- Time zone: UTC+2 (EET)
  - Summer (DST): UTC+3 (EEST)
- Postal code: MD-3651

Valea Mare is a commune in Ungheni District, Moldova. It is composed of four villages: Buzduganii de Jos, Buzduganii de Sus, Morenii Vechi and Valea Mare.
