= Ministry of Finance (Moldova) =

Government ministry of Moldova

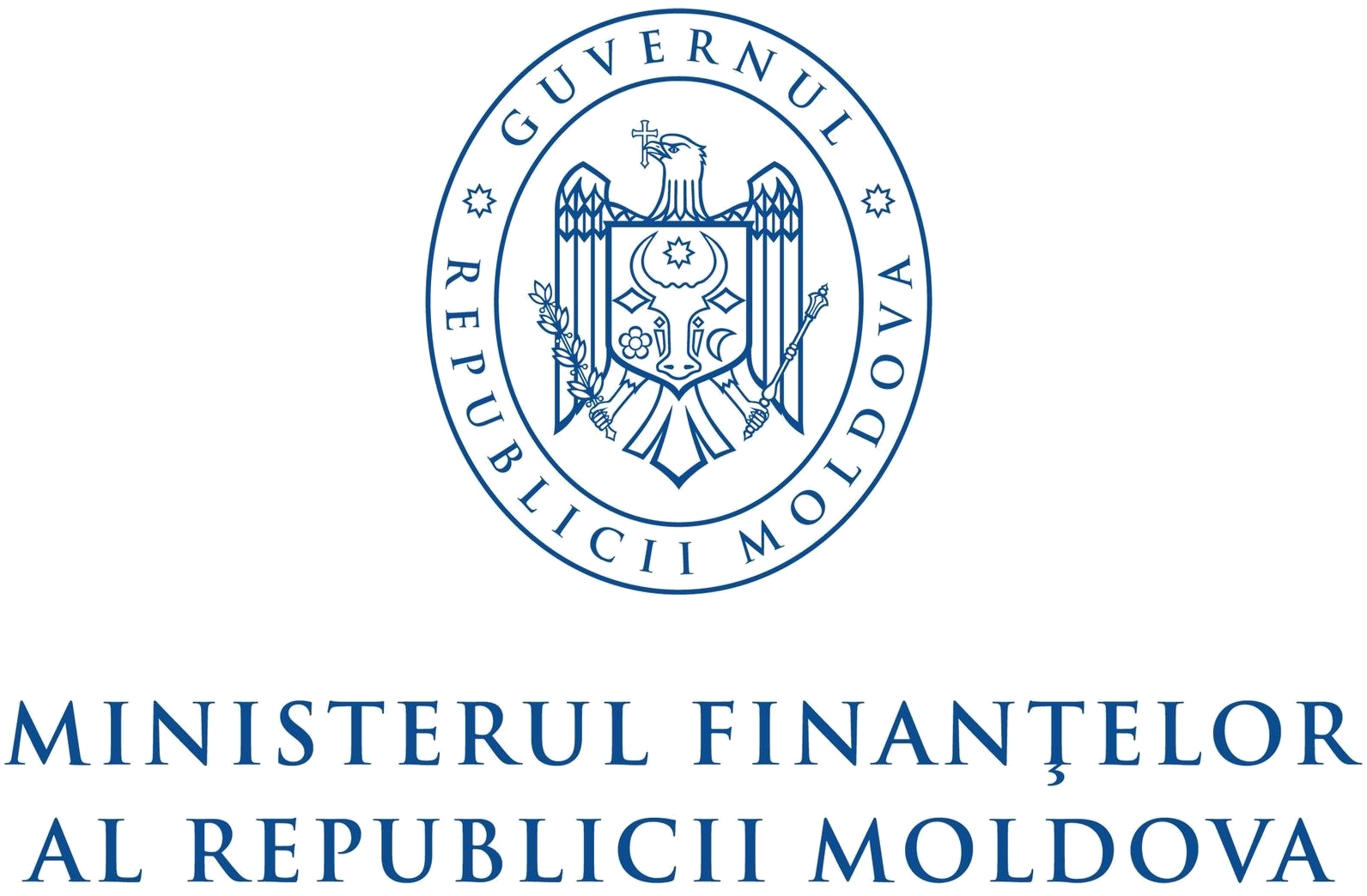

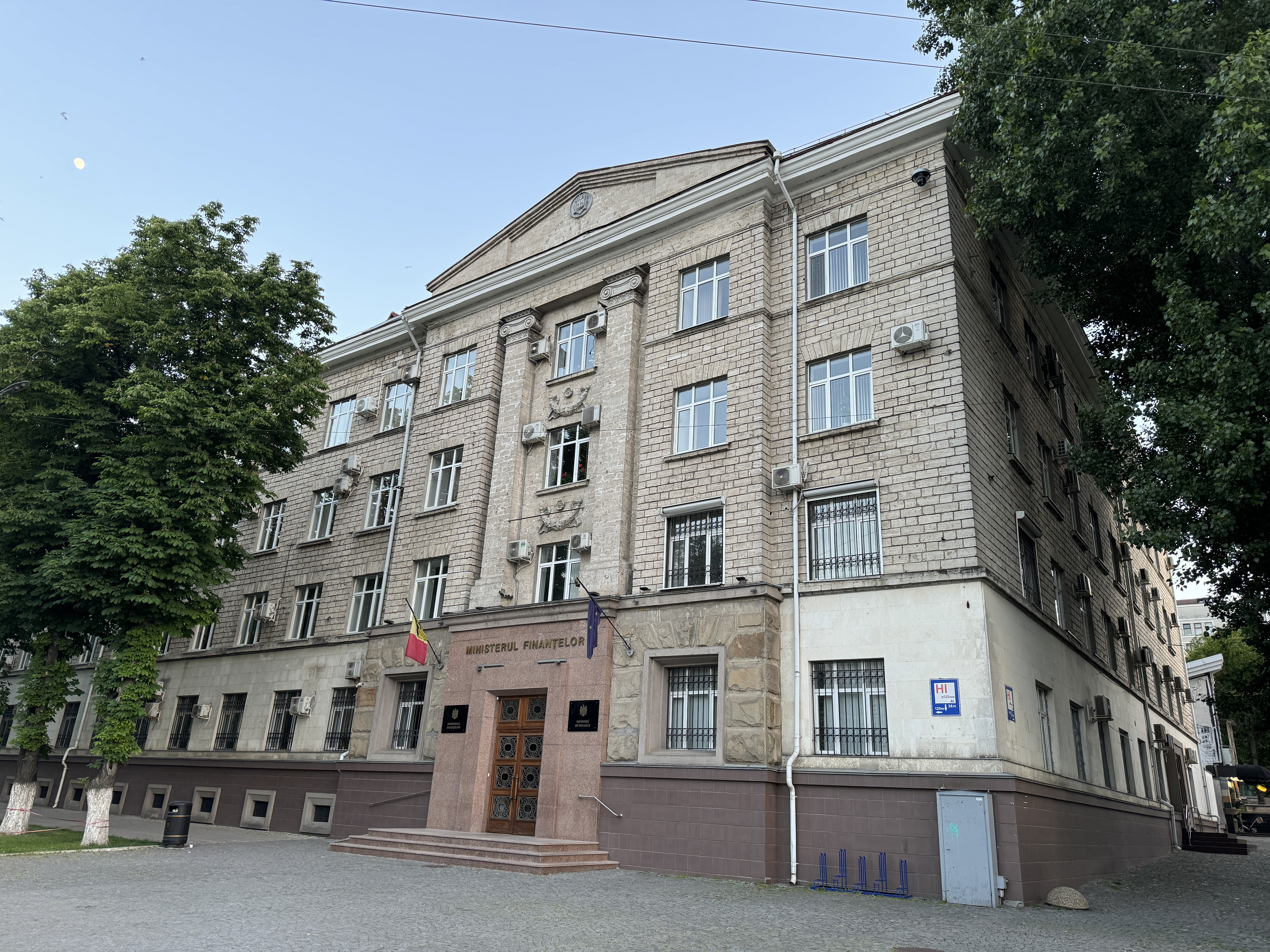
- Headquarters in Chișinău

Ministry overview
- Formed: 27 August 1991; 34 years ago
- Preceding Ministry: Ministry of Economy and Finance (1991–1992)
- Jurisdiction: Government of Moldova
- Headquarters: 9 Constantin Tănase Street, Chișinău
- Minister responsible: Victoria Belous, Minister of Finance
- Ministry executives: Dina Roșca, Secretary General; Corina Alexa, Secretary of State; Ion Gumene, Secretary of State; Elena Grumeza, Secretary of State; Maia Savva, Secretary of State
- Website: mf.gov.md

The Ministry of Finance (Romanian: Ministerul Finanțelor) is one of the fourteen ministries of the Government of Moldova. It is the central specialized body of public administration, which develops and promotes the unique policy of training and managing public finances, applying financial levers in line with the requirements of the market economy. In its activity, the Ministry of Finance is governed by the Constitution of the Republic of Moldova, the laws of the Republic, the decrees of the President of the Republic of Moldova, the resolutions of the Parliament, the ordinances, the decisions and the provisions of the Cabinet of Moldova.

== History ==
=== Armașu ministership (2016–2018) ===
On 20 January 2016, Armașu took office as finance minister in the government headed by prime minister Pavel Filip, succeeding Anatol Arapu who had held the position since 2013. On 30 November, Armașu signed a memorandum with several NGOs, business associations, and IT companies for the adoption of an electronic public procurement system, which was scheduled to launch on 1 January 2017.

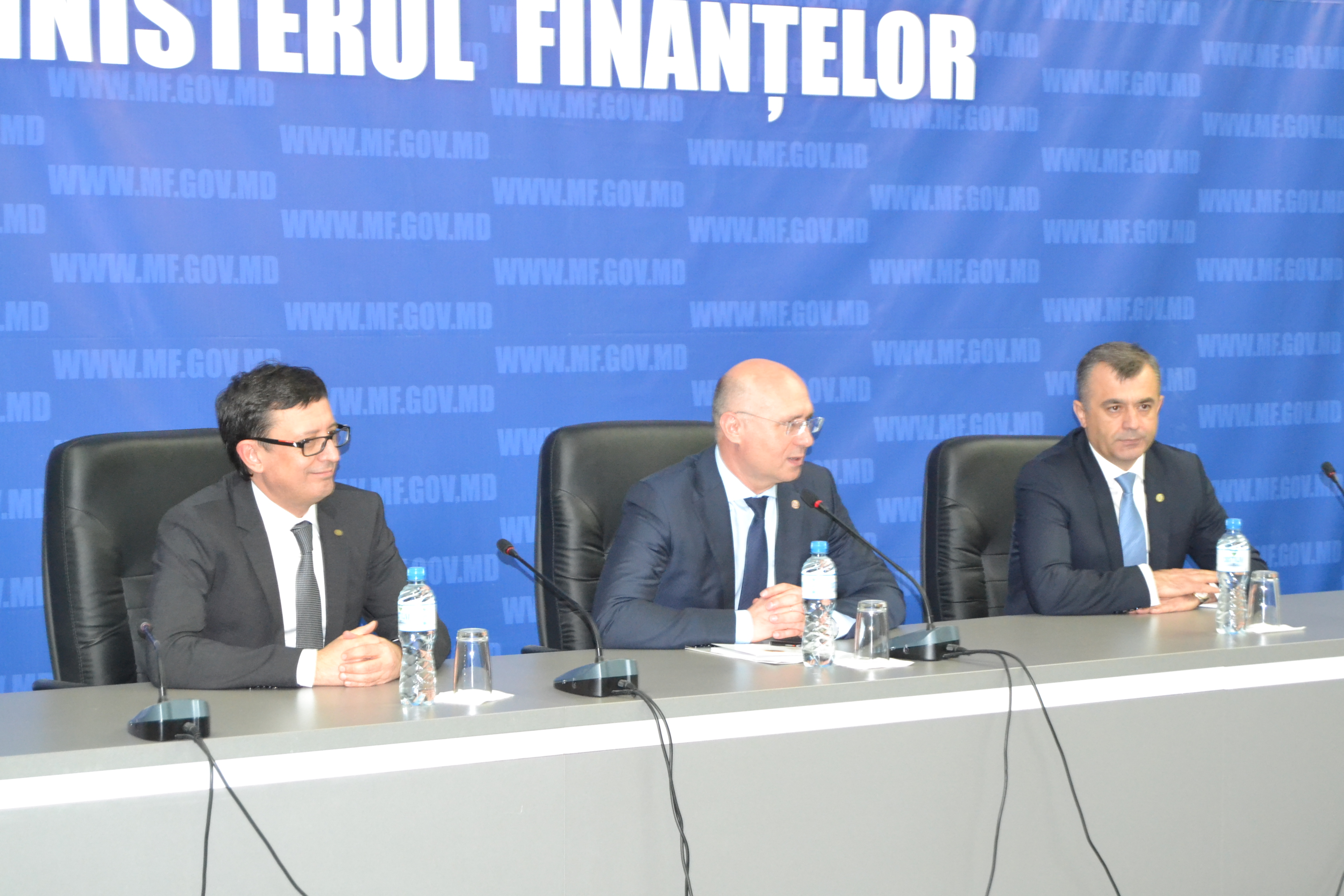
Finance minister Ion Chicu (right) with prime minister Pavel Filip (centre) and NBM governor Octavian Armașu, December 2018

In October 2018, Armașu introduced a unified salary law for the Moldovan public sector, replacing multiple pay regulations with a single wage grid, guaranteeing a minimum monthly salary of 2,000 Moldovan lei (MDL) and raising wages for lower-income categories. He stated that the reform reduced the ratio between the highest and lowest salaries from 33:1 to around 16:1, introduced a coefficient scale ranging from 1 to 15 with fixed and variable components, and increased the total wage fund by 1.3 billion MDL to ensure full coverage. Armașu resigned on 30 November 2018 to become governor of the National Bank of Moldova on the same day, being succeeded by Ion Chicu.

=== Belous ministership (2024–present) ===
On 31 July 2024, Victoria Belous was appointed finance minister in the government of Dorin Recean.

== Structure ==
Land flag of the Moldovan Customs Service

The Minister of Finance is responsible for fulfilling the tasks of the Ministry, representing the Ministry in relations with third parties, as well as with the legal and physical persons from the country or abroad. The Deputy Ministers shall exercise the powers delegated by the Minister of Finance. At the same time, the Minister is personally responsible for the way the budgetary means intended to ensure the ministry's activity are used, and to ensure the integrity of financial means and material assets at the disposal of the ministry concerned.

The ministry has the following subordinated institutions:

- State Tax Service
- Customs Service
- Public Procurement Agency
- Financial Inspection

== List of ministers ==
No.	Portrait	Name (Birth–Death)	Office term		Notes	Cabinet
1		Constantin Tampiza (born 1947)	6 June 1990	4 August 1992		Druc Muravschi
2		Claudia Melnic	4 August 1992	5 April 1994		Sangheli I
3		Valeriu Chițan (born 1955)	5 April 1994	22 May 1998		Sangheli I Ciubuc I
4		Anatol Arapu (born 1962)	22 May 1998	21 December 1999		Ciubuc II Sturza
5		Mihail Manoli (born 1954)	21 December 1999	7 February 2002		Braghiș Tarlev I
6		Zinaida Greceanîi (born 1956)	26 February 2002	10 October 2005		Tarlev I-II
7		Mihail Pop (born 1955)	12 October 2005	31 March 2008		Tarlev II
8		Mariana Durleșteanu (born 1971)	31 March 2008	25 September 2009		Greceanîi I-II
9		Veaceslav Negruța (born 1972)	25 September 2009	14 August 2013		Filat I-II Leancă
10		Anatol Arapu (born 1962)	14 August 2013	20 January 2016		Leancă Gaburici Streleț
11		Octavian Armașu (born 1969)	20 January 2016	30 November 2018		Filip
12		Ion Chicu (born 1972)	10 December 2018	8 June 2019		Filip
13		Natalia Gavrilița (born 1977)	8 June 2019	14 November 2019		Sandu
14		Sergiu Pușcuța (born 1972)	14 November 2019	31 December 2020	Deputy Prime Minister	Chicu
15		Dumitru Budianschi (born 1961)	6 August 2021	16 February 2023		Gavrilița
16		Veronica Sirețeanu (born 1985)	16 February 2023	27 September 2023		Recean
17		Petru Rotaru (born 1984)	28 September 2023	31 July 2024		Recean
18		Victoria Belous (born 1984)	31 July 2024	1 November 2025		Recean
19		Andrian Gavriliță (born 1986)	1 November 2025	22 July 2026		Munteanu
20		Victoria Belous (born 1984)	22 July 2026	Incumbent		Tofan
