= Dumitru Budianschi =

Moldovan politician

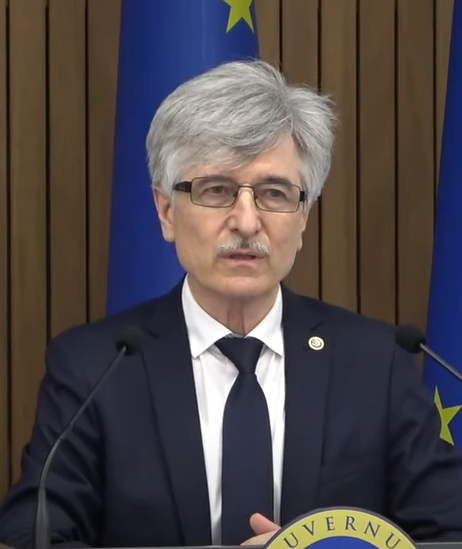
- Budianschi in 2022

Minister of Finance
- In office 6 August 2021 – 16 February 2023
- President: Maia Sandu
- Prime Minister: Natalia Gavrilița
- Preceded by: Sergiu Pușcuța
- Succeeded by: Veronica Sirețeanu

Member of the Moldovan Parliament
- In office 23 July 2021 – 8 September 2021
- Succeeded by: Ana Oglinda
- Parliamentary group: Party of Action and Solidarity

Personal details
- Born: 2 September 1961 (age 64) Chișinău, Moldavian SSR, Soviet Union
- Education: Academy of Economic Studies of Moldova

Dumitru Budianschi (pronunciation: [buˈdjanski]; born 2 September 1961) is a former Minister of Finance of the Republic of Moldova.

== Education ==
Budianschi earned a degree in radio equipment construction technology from the Polytechnic College of Bălți in 1980, followed by a degree in mathematics and cybernetics from the State University of Moldova in 1985. He later pursued advanced studies in economics, completing doctoral studies in economics and management at the Academy of Economic Studies of Moldova between 2005 and 2008. From 2015 to 2017, he returned to the Academy to earn a master's degree in Economic Sciences, specializing in public finance and taxation. Budianschi speaks Romanian, English, and Russian.

== Career ==
Budianschi worked in the field of consulting and expertise in various institutions in Moldova and abroad, including the European Bank for Reconstruction and Development, the World Bank, and the United Nations Development Programme.

Budianschi was a member of the Parliament of Moldova as the deputy the Party of Action and Solidarity faction. He served as Minister of Finance in the government under Natalia Gavrilița from August 2021 to February 2023. As Minister of Finance, Budianschi prioritized modest salary increases in the public sector to help offset inflation and support low-income workers. He oversaw a raise in the minimum public salary from 2,200 to 3,100 lei and secured increases for specific groups such as drivers and psychopedagogical staff. Emphasizing fiscal responsibility, Budianschi acknowledged the limits of Moldova's 50 billion lei budget and clarified that larger salary hikes, such as those for Constitutional court judges, were driven by parliamentary amendments, not ministry decisions.

In March 2023, Budianschi was appointed, by decision of the Parliament of Moldova, as Chairman of the Board of Directors of the National Commission for Financial Markets, following Cornelia Cozlovschi resigning for personal reasons.

== Scientific contributions ==
Budianschi authored 7 scientific articles and multiple research/analyses on various economic topics.
