= Cristina Lesnic =

Moldovan politician (born 1982)

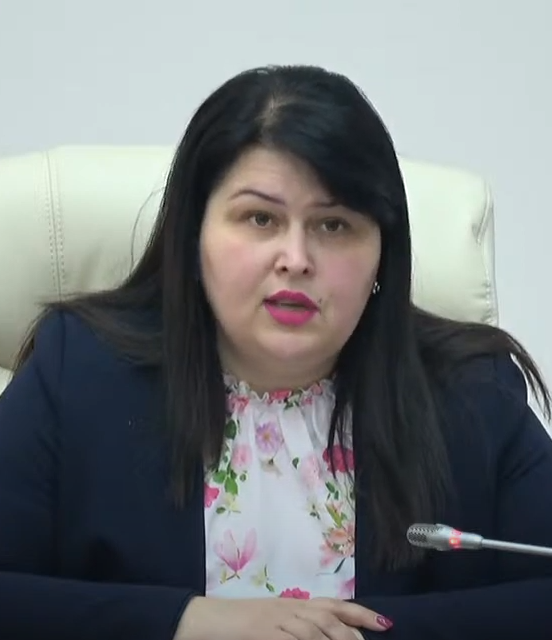
- Lesnic in 2020

Deputy Prime Minister of Moldova for Reintegration
- In office 16 March 2020 – 9 November 2020
- President: Igor Dodon
- Prime Minister: Ion Chicu
- Preceded by: Alexandru Flenchea
- Succeeded by: Olga Cebotari
- In office 10 January 2018 – 8 June 2019
- President: Igor Dodon
- Prime Minister: Pavel Filip
- Preceded by: Gheorghe Bălan
- Succeeded by: Vasilii Șova

Personal details
- Born: 28 March 1982 (age 44) Chișinău, Moldavian SSR, Soviet Union
- Education: Moldova State University

Cristina Lesnic (born 28 March 1982) is a Moldovan politician who has served two separate terms as Deputy Prime Minister of Moldova for Reintegration.
