= Victor Gaiciuc =

Moldovan military general and politician

Divisional general Victor Gaiciuc OR
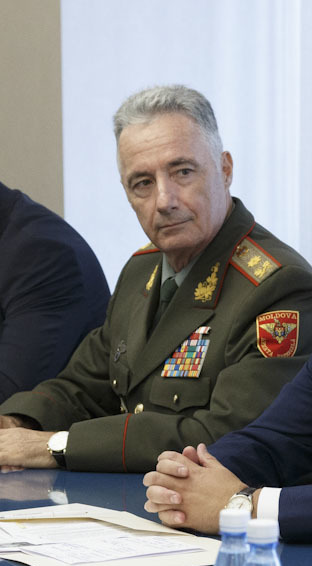
- Gaiciuc in 2019

Minister of Defense
- In office 9 November 2020 – 5 August 2021
- President: Igor Dodon; Maia Sandu
- Prime Minister: Ion Chicu; Aureliu Ciocoi (acting)
- Preceded by: Alexandru Pînzari
- Succeeded by: Anatolie Nosatîi
- In office 14 November 2019 – 16 March 2020
- President: Igor Dodon
- Prime Minister: Ion Chicu
- Preceded by: Pavel Voicu
- Succeeded by: Alexandru Pînzari
- In office 19 April 2001 – 15 October 2004
- President: Vladimir Voronin
- Prime Minister: Vasile Tarlev
- Preceded by: Boris Gămurari
- Succeeded by: Valeriu Pleșca

Defense and National Security Advisor to the President – Secretary of the Supreme Security Council
- In office 16 March 2020 – 9 November 2020
- President: Igor Dodon
- Succeeded by: Ana Revenco
- In office 22 August 2019 – 14 November 2019
- President: Igor Dodon
- Preceded by: Artur Gumeniuc

Member of the Moldovan Parliament
- In office 9 March 2019 – 4 September 2019
- Succeeded by: Anatolie Labuneț
- Parliamentary group: Party of Socialists

Moldovan Ambassador to Belgium, the Netherlands, Luxembourg and NATO
- In office 17 January 2005 – 6 November 2009
- President: Vladimir Voronin; Mihai Ghimpu (acting)
- Prime Minister: Vasile Tarlev; Zinaida Greceanîi; Vitalie Pîrlog (acting); Vladimir Filat
- Preceded by: Mihai Popov
- Succeeded by: Mihai Gribincea

Deputy Minister of Defense
- In office 14 April 2000 – 19 April 2001
- President: Petru Lucinschi; Vladimir Voronin
- Prime Minister: Dumitru Braghiș
- Minister: Boris Gămurari
- In office 3 June 1997 – 25 March 1999
- President: Petru Lucinschi
- Prime Minister: Ion Ciubuc; Ion Sturza
- Minister: Valeriu Pasat

Personal details
- Born: 12 March 1957 (age 69) Pepeni, Moldavian SSR, Soviet Union (now Moldova)
- Party: Party of Socialists of the Republic of Moldova (since 2016)
- Spouse: Valentina Gaiciuc
- Children: 2
- Education: Kharkov Air Defense High School (1978); Lenin Military-Political Academy (1989); NATO Defense College (1997)
- Occupation: Military

Military service
- Branch/service: Moldova Air Force
- Years of service: 1978–2004
- Rank: Divisional general

Victor Gaiciuc (born 12 March 1957) is a Moldovan military general, who served as Minister of Defense of Moldova from 2001 until 2004, 2019 until 2020 and 2020 until 2021. He was also the Defense and National Security Advisor to former president Igor Dodon. He is currently the chairman of the Union of Officers of Moldova and was also the secretary of the Supreme Security Council.

== Biography ==
A pronunciation of Gaiciuc's name by Voice of America.

Victor Gaiciuc was born on 12 March 1957 in the village of Pepeni, in the Sîngerei District of the Moldovan SSR. He graduated from the Kharkov Air Defense High School (now the Ivan Kozhedub National Air Force University) in 1978 and then studied at the Lenin Military-Political Academy from 1986 to 1989, later obtaining the scientific title of Doctor of Historical Sciences. In between that time, he was pilot of the Soviet Air Force, commanding aviation regiments in Ukraine and Belarus. After graduating in 1989, he became responsible for training personnel in the Belarusian Military District. In 1993, Gaiciuc returned to the newly independent Republic of Moldova, where he is appointed as a chief specialist in the Ministry of Defense.

On June 3, 1997, he was appointed Deputy Minister of Defense, responsible for staff training, military legislation and international relations. That same year, he began to take courses at the NATO Defense College in Rome. He was removed from his position on 7 April 1999, becoming a commissioner in the ministry and serving in that position for one year. He was reappointed as deputy defense minister in April 2000 who was responsible for international cooperation.

=== Defence Minister (2001–2004) ===
By a parliamentary and vote of confidence on April 19, 2001, Colonel Gaiciuc was appointed as the Minister of Defense in the Government of Prime Minister Vasile Tarlev, with Gaiciuc being promoted to brigadier general just 10 months later. In early 2004, he awarded three Moldovan soldiers serving in Iraq with the Medal of Merit. He was dismissed from office on 15 October 2004 by presidential decree after the Supreme Security Council made an appeal for his dismissal, criticizing his work in the defense ministry and finding him responsible for the theft of arms.

=== Diplomatic career ===
On 12 January 2005, Gaiciuc was appointed Ambassador Extraordinary and Plenipotentiary of Moldova to the Kingdom of Belgium and concurrently representative of the country to NATO. He held these positions for close a year before additionally becoming the ambassador of Moldova to the Netherlands, residing in Brussels.

=== Adviser to President Dodon ===
He was appointed to the post of Supreme Security Council Secretary in August 2019, succeeding Artur Gameniuc who was transferred to the Information and Security Service of the Republic of Moldova. On 2 September, he met with secretary of the Security Council of Russia Nikolai Patrushev in Moscow where he was invited to attend an annual meeting between the secretaries of the security councils of CIS member states in Moscow. In stating what his mandate would look like, he vowed to "direct my efforts to further promote patriotic values". In February 2019, he was elected to the Moldovan Parliament. In his official position as advisor, he accompanied Dodon during the 2020 Moscow Victory Day Parade. Two weeks earlier, he had been ordered by Dodon to see off the Moldovan contingent participating in the parade at the airport.

=== Defence Minister (2019–2020, 2020-2021) ===
He was appointed by Prime Minister Ion Chicu to lead the new technocratic government following the collapse of the Sandu Cabinet led by Prime Minister Maia Sandu, who was ousted in a vote of no confidence after a disagreement with the co-governing Party of Socialists of the Republic of Moldova. He was handed the banner of the defense ministry by President Dodon from his predecessor Pavel Voicu on 14 November. In an interview, he deflected concerns about a relationship with Dodon, stating that "service and personal relationships are two different things". In early 2020, Gaiciuc signed an agreement with Bishop Vladimir (Cantarean) of the Moldovan Orthodox Church on religious cooperation with the Moldovan National Army. Around the same time, he oversaw the creation of the National Council for War Veterans Affairs, an association which he is the president of. He was dismissed on 16 March 2020, being replaced by Alexandru Pînzari. He was subsequently promoted to the rank of Divisional general.

He was reappointed on 9 November 2020, following the first round of Moldovan presidential election on 1 November.

In August 2021, he was replaced as Defence Minister by Anatolie Nosatîi.

== Political views ==
Regarding a possible unification of Moldova and Romania, he called the unionist idea a danger for Moldova's sovereignty and that he is a statist. He also added that, however, if the Moldovans decide throw a referendum to unite with Romania, he will not oppose it.

== Private life ==
Gaiciuc is currently married with two children. He is currently decorated with military distinctions of Moldova, as well as distinctions from other countries (Russia, Kazakhstan, Ukraine, and Belgium). Among his awards are the Medal "For Impeccable Service", the Order of the Republic and the Medal "100 years of Aviation". Gaiciuc speaks Romanian, Russian and French. He is considered to be a good friend of Moldovan president Igor Dodon, who had proposed Gaiciuc to the position of defense minister following his rejection of Eugen Sturza to the office.

== Gallery ==
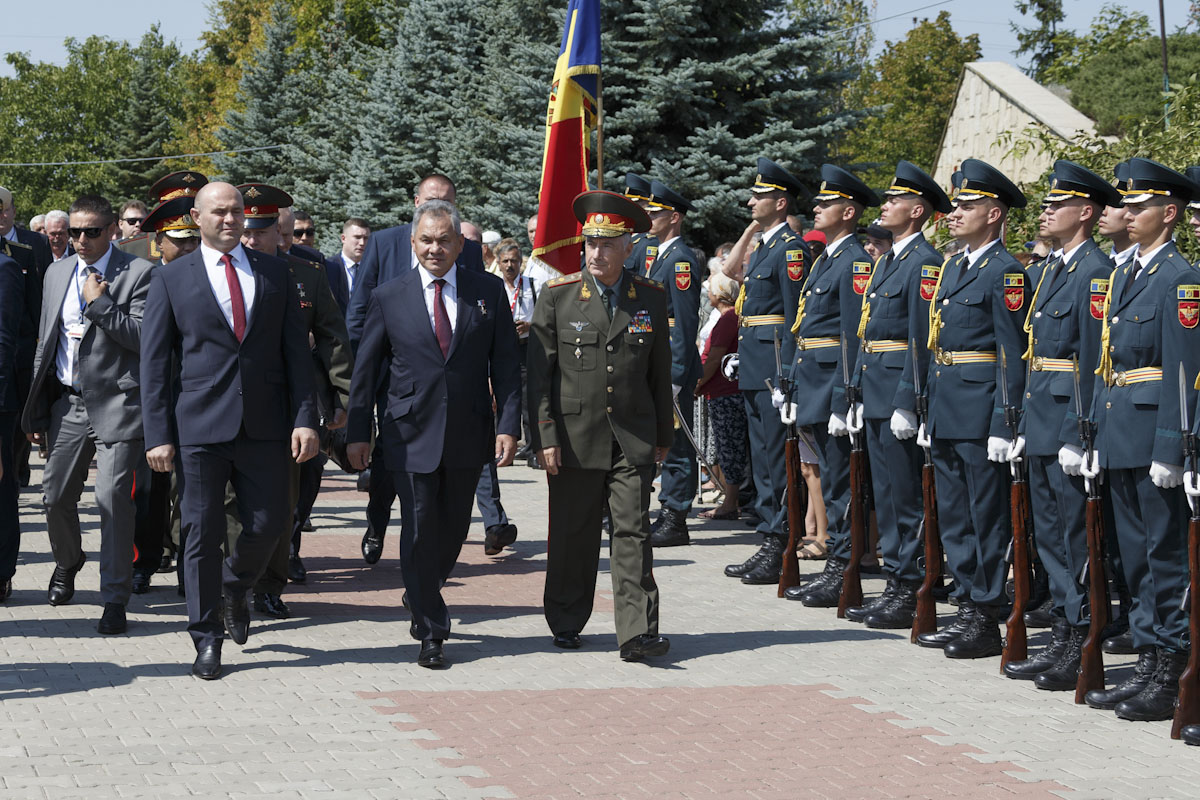
Gaiciuc with Voicu and Russian Defence Minister Sergey Shoigu in Bender, August 2019.

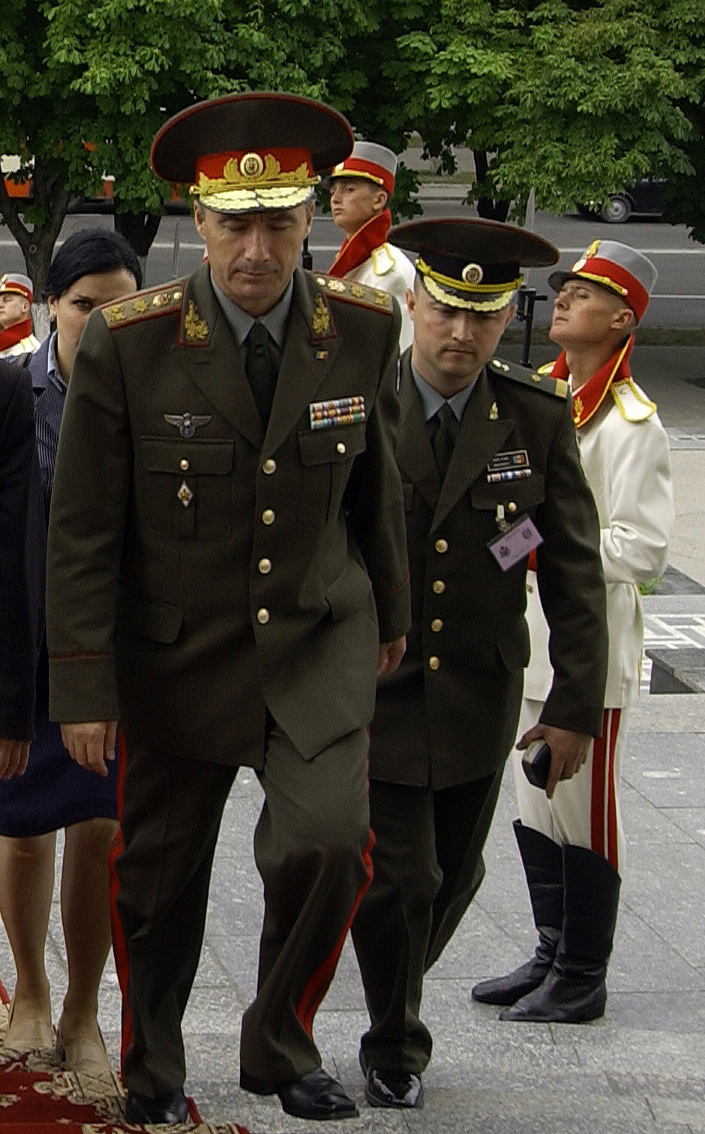
Gaiciuc in June 2004.

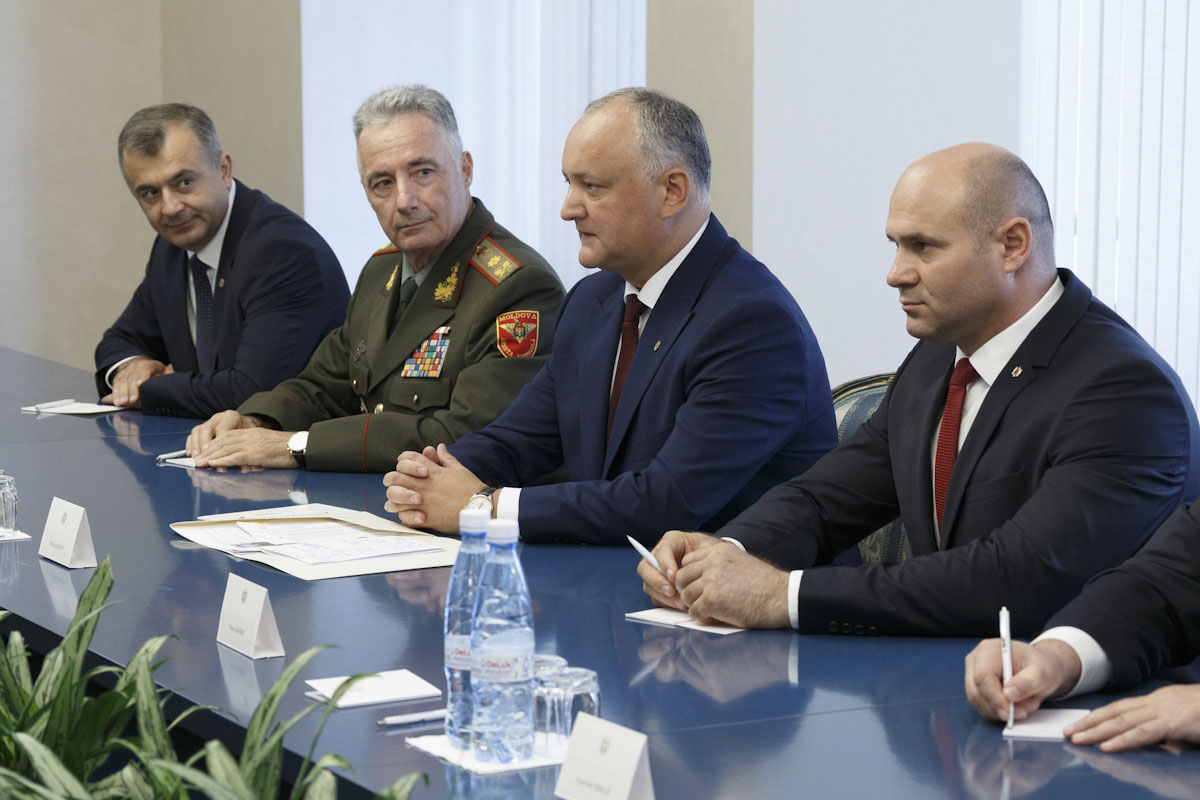
Gaiciuc (center left) with Moldovan President Igor Dodon (center) and Defence Minister Pavel Voicu in August 2019.
