= Alexandru Flenchea =

Moldovan politician (born 1979)

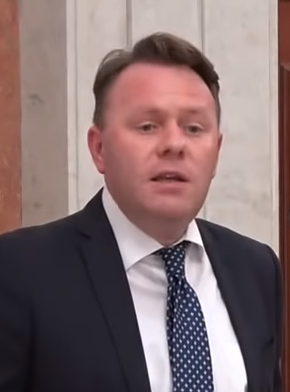
- Flenchea in 2019

Deputy Prime Minister of Moldova for Reintegration
- In office 14 November 2019 – 16 March 2020
- President: Igor Dodon
- Prime Minister: Ion Chicu
- Preceded by: Vasilii Șova
- Succeeded by: Cristina Lesnic

Personal details
- Born: 25 November 1979 (age 46) Chișinău, Moldavian SSR, Soviet Union

Alexandru Flenchea (born 25 November 1979) is a Moldovan conflict resolution expert and former politician. He was Deputy prime minister for reintegration in the cabinet of Ion Chicu.
