= Delacău, Transnistria =

Delacău Далакэу (Russian) Далакеу (Ukrainian)
- Commune
- Location within Moldova
- Coordinates: 47°7′41″N 29°17′58″E
- Country (de jure): Moldova
- Country (de facto): Transnistria (Note: Transnistria's political status is disputed. It considers itself to be an independent state, but this is not recognised by any UN member state. The Moldovan government and the international community consider Transnistria a part of Moldova's territory.)
- Elevation: 18 m (59 ft)
- Time zone: UTC+2 (EET)
  - Summer (DST): UTC+3 (EEST)

Delacău (Moldovan Cyrillic: Делакэу; Russian: Делакеу, romanized: Delakeu; Ukrainian: Далакеу, romanized: Dalakeu) is a commune in the Grigoriopol sub-district of Transnistria, Moldova. It is composed of two villages, Crasnaia Gorca (Moldovan Cyrillic: Красная Горка; Russian: Красная Горка, romanized: Krasnaya Gorka; Ukrainian: Красна Горка, romanized: Krasna Horka) and Delacău. It is currently under the administration of the breakaway government of the Transnistrian Moldovan Republic.

== Notable people ==
- Veaceslav Negruța (born 1972), economist
- Konstantin Pogreban (born 1987), former professional footballer
