= Mihail Pop =

Moldovan economist and politician (born 1955)

Mihail Pop OR

Secretary General of the Government of Moldova
- In office 3 April 2008 – 25 September 2009
- President: Vladimir Voronin; Mihai Ghimpu (acting)
- Prime Minister: Zinaida Greceanîi; Vitalie Pîrlog (acting)
- Preceded by: Nicolae Gumenîi
- Succeeded by: Victor Bodiu

Minister of Finance
- In office 12 October 2005 – 31 March 2008
- President: Vladimir Voronin
- Prime Minister: Vasile Tarlev
- Preceded by: Zinaida Greceanîi
- Succeeded by: Mariana Durleșteanu

Deputy Minister of Finance
- In office 4 May 2005 – 12 October 2005
- President: Vladimir Voronin
- Prime Minister: Vasile Tarlev
- Minister: Zinaida Greceanîi

Personal details
- Born: 31 October 1955 (age 70) Serednie Vodiane, Ukrainian SSR, Soviet Union

Mihail Pop (born 31 October 1955) is a Moldovan economist and politician who served as the Minister of Finance of Moldova from 2005 until 2008. He was born in Serednie Vodiane (Romanian: Apșa de Mijloc), an ethnic Romanian village in Zakarpattia Oblast, Ukraine.
