= Pîrjolteni =

- Village
- Location within Moldova
- Coordinates: 47.2002777778°N 28.2430555556°E
- Country: Moldova
- District: Călărași District

Government
  - Mayor: Vasile Stavilă (PLDM)

Population (2014 census)
  - Total: 1,560
- Time zone: UTC+2 (EET)
  - Summer (DST): UTC+3 (EEST)
- Website: --

Pîrjolteni is a village in Călărași District, Moldova.
