= Fîntînița =

- Commune
- Location within Moldova
- Coordinates: 48.1038888889°N 27.6958333333°E
- Country: Moldova
- District: Drochia District

Population (2014)
  - Total: 1,186
- Time zone: UTC+2 (EET)
  - Summer (DST): UTC+3 (EEST)

Fîntînița is a commune in Drochia District, Moldova. It is composed of two villages, Fîntînița (formerly Ghizdita) and Ghizdita, loc. st.c.f. (Ghizdita station). At the 2004 census, the commune had 1,405 inhabitants.

== Notable people ==
- Valeriu Chițan (born 1955), economist and politician
