= Sergiu Pușcuța =

Moldovan politician

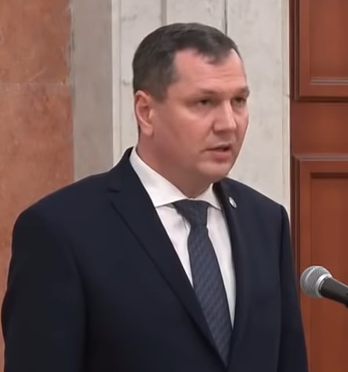
- Pușcuța in 2019

Deputy Prime Minister of Moldova
- In office 14 November 2019 – 31 December 2020
- President: Igor Dodon; Maia Sandu
- Prime Minister: Ion Chicu
- Preceded by: Andrei Năstase
- Succeeded by: Andrei Spînu

Minister of Finance
- In office 14 November 2019 – 31 December 2020
- President: Igor Dodon; Maia Sandu
- Prime Minister: Ion Chicu
- Preceded by: Natalia Gavrilița
- Succeeded by: Dumitru Budianschi

Financial Advisor to the President
- In office 30 December 2008 – 11 September 2009
- President: Vladimir Voronin

Economic Advisor to the President
- In office 10 March 2000 – 7 April 2001
- President: Petru Lucinschi
- Preceded by: Iurie Badîr
- Succeeded by: Oleg Reidman

Personal details
- Born: 4 September 1972 (age 54) Lipcani, Moldavian SSR, Soviet Union
- Education: Academy of Economic Studies of Moldova

Sergiu Pușcuța (born 4 September 1972) is a Moldovan economist and politician who was Minister of Finance of the Republic of Moldova in the Chicu Cabinet.
