= Valentina Țapiș =

Moldovan politician (born 1963)

Secretary of State of the Ministry of Agriculture, Regional Development and Environment
- In office 20 December 2017 – 21 August 2019
- President: Igor Dodon
- Prime Minister: Pavel Filip; Maia Sandu
- Minister: Vasile Bîtca; Liviu Volconovici; Nicolae Ciubuc; Georgeta Mincu

Minister of Environment
- In office 6 June 2014 – 18 February 2015
- President: Nicolae Timofti
- Prime Minister: Iurie Leancă
- Preceded by: Gheorghe Șalaru
- Succeeded by: Sergiu Palihovici

Deputy Minister of Environment
- In office 26 September 2012 – 6 June 2014
- President: Nicolae Timofti
- Prime Minister: Vladimir Filat; Iurie Leancă
- Minister: Gheorghe Șalaru

Personal details
- Born: 31 July 1963 (age 63) Hîncești, Moldavian SSR, Soviet Union

Valentina Țapiș (born 31 July 1963) is a Moldovan politician who served as the Minister of Environment of Moldova from 2014 until 2015.

She is a graduate of Moldova State University, holding degrees in chemistry and law.
