= Ion Perju =

Moldovan politician (born 1971)

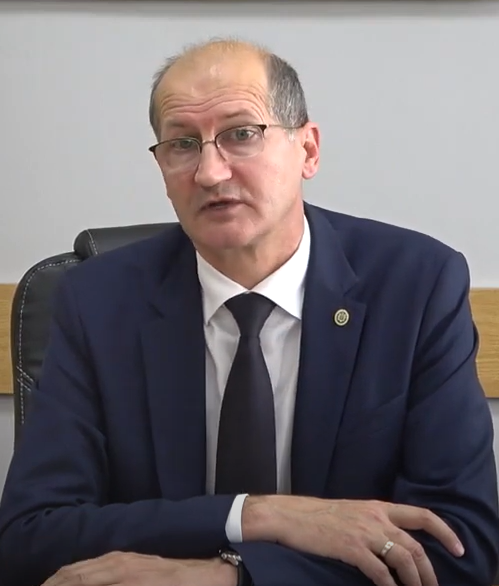
- Perju in 2021

Minister of Agriculture, Regional Development and Environment
- In office 14 November 2019 – 6 August 2021
- President: Igor Dodon; Maia Sandu
- Prime Minister: Ion Chicu; Aureliu Ciocoi (acting)
- Preceded by: Georgeta Mincu
- Succeeded by: Viorel Gherciu (as Minister of Agriculture and Food Industry)

Public Administration and Agroindustrial Advisor to the President
- In office 23 December 2016 – 14 November 2019
- President: Igor Dodon
- Preceded by: Vladimir Ciobanu
- Succeeded by: Ghenadie Iurco

Deputy Minister of Agriculture and Food Industry
- In office 13 February 2008 – 25 November 2009
- President: Vladimir Voronin; Mihai Ghimpu (acting)
- Prime Minister: Vasile Tarlev; Zinaida Greceanîi; Vitalie Pîrlog (acting); Vladimir Filat
- Minister: Anatolie Gorodenco; Valeriu Cosarciuc

Personal details
- Born: 5 November 1971 (age 54) Căzănești, Moldavian SSR, Soviet Union
- Party: Party of Socialists of the Republic of Moldova

Ion Perju (born 5 November 1971) is a Moldovan politician. He served as Minister of Agriculture, Regional Development and Environment from 14 November 2019 to 23 December 2020 in the cabinet of Prime Minister Ion Chicu. He continued to serve in this position with Aureliu Ciocoi as acting Prime Minister until 6 August 2021.

Political offices
| Preceded by Georgeta Mincu | Minister of Agriculture, Regional Development and Environment; 2019–2021 | Succeeded by Viorel Gherciu |
