= Iuliana Cantaragiu =

Moldovan politician (born 1975)

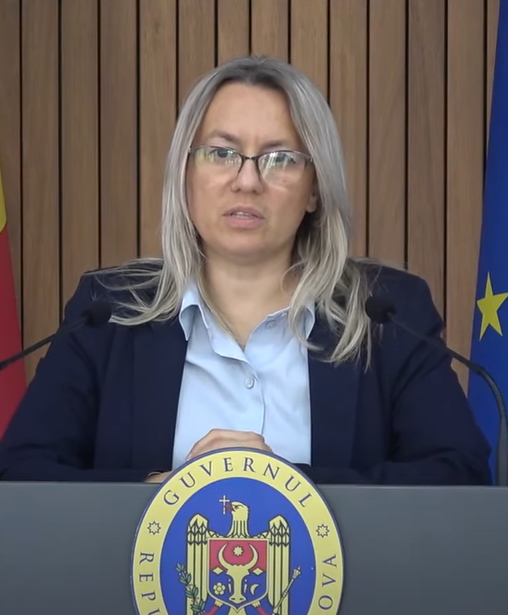
- Cantaragiu in 2022

Environmental Protection and Climate Change Advisor to the President
- In office 6 August 2021 – 24 December 2024
- President: Maia Sandu

Minister of Environment
- In office 6 August 2021 – 8 September 2022
- President: Maia Sandu
- Prime Minister: Natalia Gavrilița
- Preceded by: Valeriu Munteanu (2017)
- Succeeded by: Vladimir Bolea (acting)

Secretary of State of the Ministry of Agriculture, Regional Development and Environment
- In office 7 August 2019 – 19 November 2019
- President: Igor Dodon
- Prime Minister: Maia Sandu; Ion Chicu
- Minister: Georgeta Mincu; Ion Perju

Personal details
- Born: 2 July 1975 (age 51) Chișinău, Moldavian SSR, Soviet Union
- Education: Bucharest University of Economic Studies

Iuliana Cantaragiu (born 2 July 1975) was the Minister of Environment of the Republic of Moldova.
