= Vasile Bumacov =

Moldovan politician (born 1957)

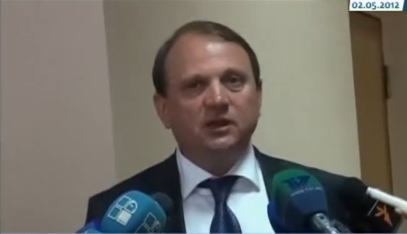
- Bumacov in 2012

1st Moldovan Ambassador to Japan and South Korea
- In office 18 April 2016 – 11 August 2020
- President: Nicolae Timofti; Igor Dodon
- Prime Minister: Pavel Filip; Maia Sandu; Ion Chicu
- Succeeded by: Dumitru Socolan

Minister of Agriculture and Food Industry
- In office 14 January 2011 – 18 February 2015
- President: Marian Lupu (acting); Nicolae Timofti
- Prime Minister: Vladimir Filat; Iurie Leancă
- Preceded by: Valeriu Cosarciuc
- Succeeded by: Ion Sula

Deputy Minister of Agriculture and Food Industry
- In office 25 November 2009 – 14 January 2011
- President: Mihai Ghimpu (acting); Vladimir Filat (acting); Marian Lupu (acting)
- Prime Minister: Vladimir Filat
- Minister: Valeriu Cosarciuc

First Deputy Minister of Agriculture and Manufacturing Industry
- In office 27 December 1999 – 7 May 2001
- President: Petru Lucinschi; Vladimir Voronin
- Prime Minister: Dumitru Braghiș; Vasile Tarlev
- Minister: Ion Russu; Dmitri Todoroglo

Personal details
- Born: 1 January 1957 (age 69) Mereșeuca, Moldavian SSR, Soviet Union
- Party: Liberal Democratic Party of Moldova
- Children: Vitalie and Diana
- Profession: engineer

Vasile Bumacov (born 1 January 1957) is a Moldovan politician who served as Minister of Agriculture and Food Industry of Moldova in the Second Vlad Filat Cabinet from 14 January 2011 until 18 February 2015, after replacing Valeriu Cosarciuc (2009–2011) and it was succeeded by Ion Sula (2015–2016). He served also as the First Deputy Minister of Agriculture and Food Industry (1999–2001, 2009–2010). Since 2004, he has been a member of the Assembly of the Moldovan Academy of Sciences.

He commenced his diplomatic career as ambassador to Japan on 27 January 2016, and presented his credentials to Emperor Akihito, current Emperor Emeritus Akihito, at the Tokyo Imperial Palace on 18 April that year. Ambassador Bumacov had fulfilled his diplomatic obligations to Japan until 31 July 2020, when the Cabinet of Moldova accepted his appointment as ambassador to South Korea.
