= Rodica Iordanov =

Moldovan jurist and environmentalist (born 1976)

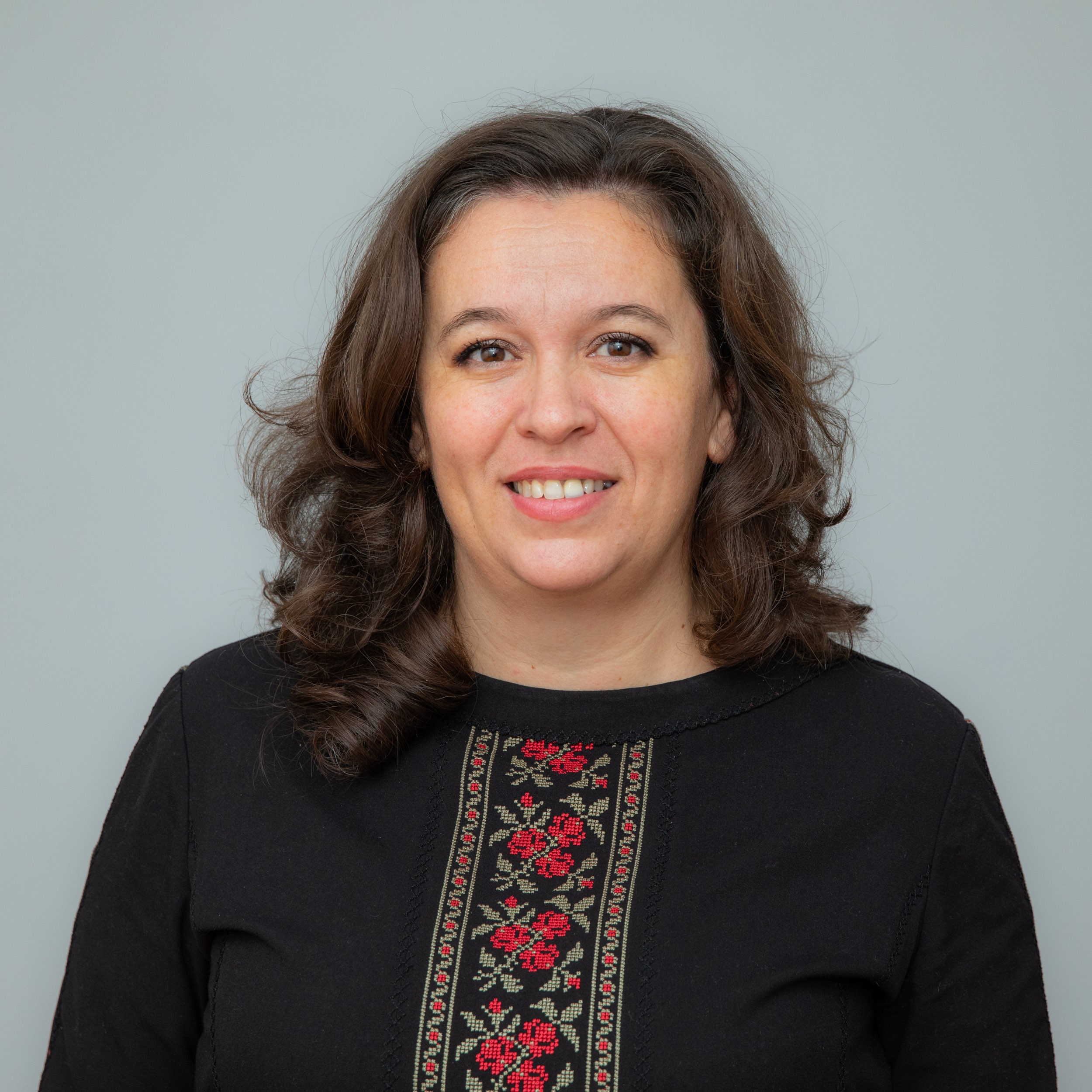
- Official portrait, 2022

Minister of Environment
- In office 16 November 2022 – 13 March 2024
- President: Maia Sandu
- Prime Minister: Natalia Gavrilița; Dorin Recean
- Preceded by: Vladimir Bolea (acting)
- Succeeded by: Sergiu Lazarencu

Secretary of State of the Ministry of Environment
- In office 9 August 2021 – 16 November 2022
- President: Maia Sandu
- Prime Minister: Natalia Gavrilița
- Minister: Iuliana Cantaragiu; Vladimir Bolea (acting)

Personal details
- Born: 11 March 1976 (age 50)
- Education: Moldova State University; Academy of Sciences of Moldova; Maastricht University

Iordanca-Rodica Iordanov (born 11 March 1976) is a Moldovan jurist and environmentalist who served as the Minister of Environment of Moldova in the Recean Cabinet.
