= Gheorghe Ichim =

Moldovan politician (born 1983)

Gheorghe Ichim MP
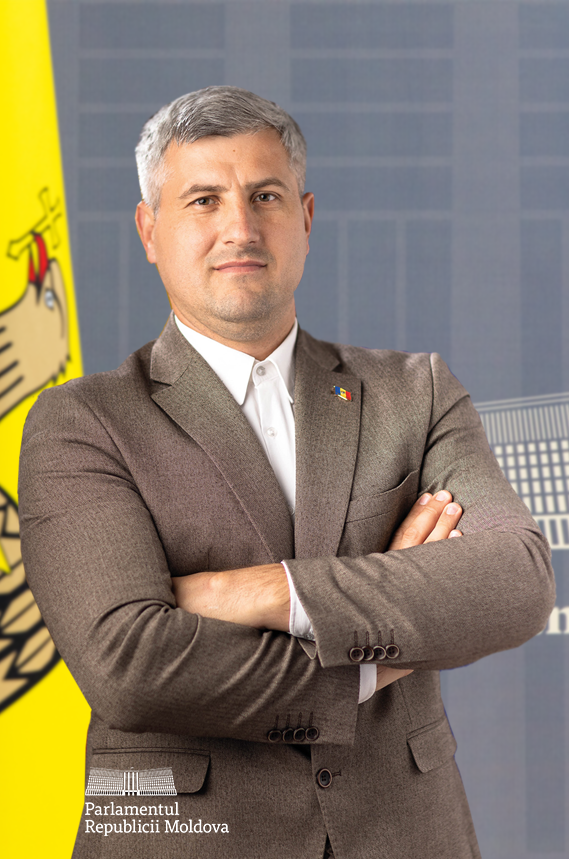
- Official portrait, 2025

Member of the Moldovan Parliament
- Incumbent
- Assumed office 6 November 2025
- Preceded by: Ludmila Catlabuga
- Parliamentary group: Party of Action and Solidarity
- In office 23 July 2021 – 16 October 2025
- Parliamentary group: Party of Action and Solidarity

Personal details
- Born: 6 October 1983 (age 42) Copăceni, Moldavian SSR, Soviet Union
- Education: Moldova State University

Gheorghe Ichim (born 6 October 1983) is a Moldovan jurist and politician. He serves as Member of the Moldovan Parliament for PAS.
