= Șalaru =

Șalaru is a Romanian surname. Notable people with the surname include:

- Anatol Șalaru (born 1962), Moldovan politician
- Gheorghe Șalaru (born 1961), Moldovan politician
