= Sergiu Lazarencu =

Moldovan economist (born 1985)

Sergiu Lazarencu MP
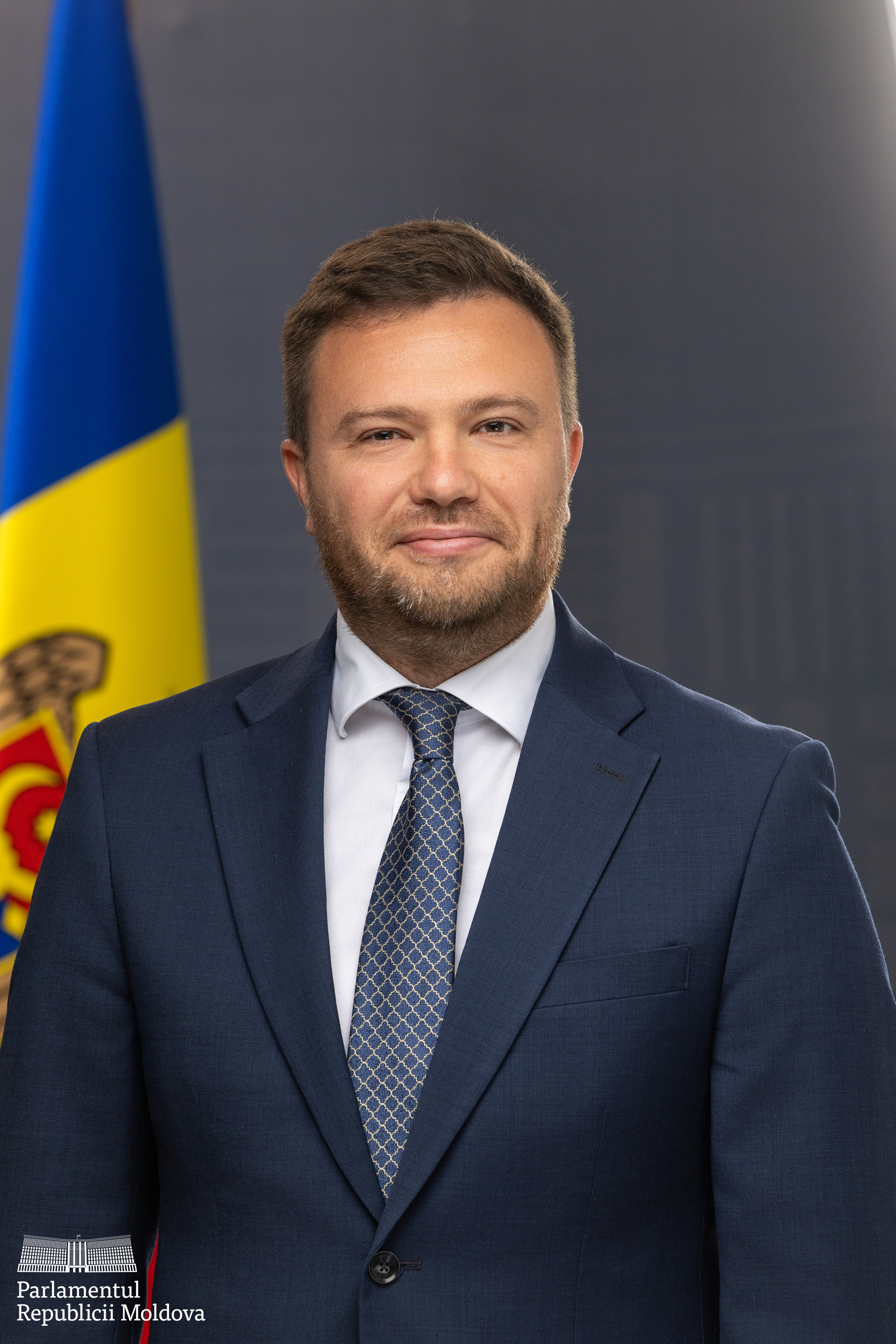
- Official portrait, 2025

Member of the Moldovan Parliament
- Incumbent
- Assumed office 22 October 2025
- Parliamentary group: Party of Action and Solidarity
- In office 23 July 2021 – 14 March 2024
- Succeeded by: Grigore Grădinaru
- Parliamentary group: Party of Action and Solidarity

Minister of Environment
- In office 14 March 2024 – 1 November 2025
- President: Maia Sandu
- Prime Minister: Dorin Recean
- Preceded by: Rodica Iordanov
- Succeeded by: Gheorghe Hajder

Deputy Mayor of Stăuceni
- In office 1 January 2020 – 1 August 2021

Personal details
- Born: July 16, 1985 (age 41) Soroca, Moldavian SSR, Soviet Union
- Education: Academy of Economic Studies of Moldova

Sergiu Lazarencu (born 16 July 1985) is a Moldovan economist from 2024 to 2025, he held the office of the Minister of Environment of Moldova in the Recean Cabinet.
