= Valeriu Cosarciuc =

Moldovan politician

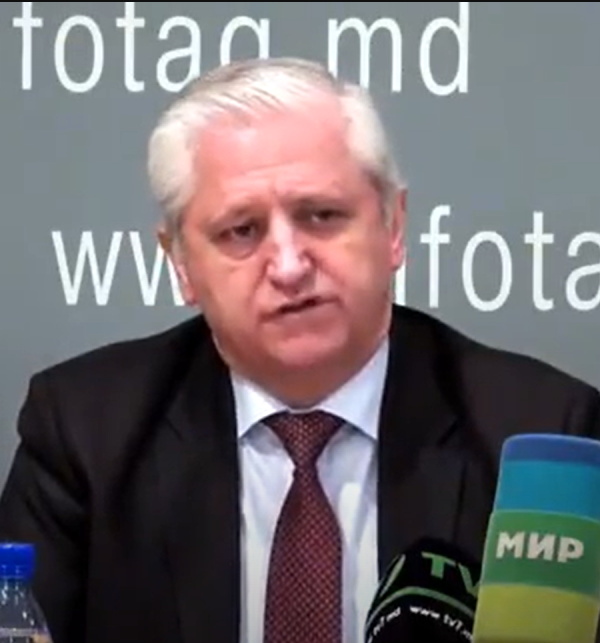
- Cosarciuc in 2016

Minister of Agriculture and Food Industry
- In office 25 September 2009 – 14 January 2011
- President: Mihai Ghimpu (acting); Vladimir Filat (acting); Marian Lupu (acting)
- Prime Minister: Vladimir Filat
- Preceded by: Anatolie Gorodenco
- Succeeded by: Vasile Bumacov

Member of the Moldovan Parliament
- In office 25 February 2001 – 22 April 2009
- Parliamentary group: Our Moldova Alliance

Deputy Prime Minister of Moldova
- In office 21 December 1999 – 19 April 2001
- President: Petru Lucinschi; Vladimir Voronin
- Prime Minister: Dumitru Braghiş
- Succeeded by: Dmitri Todoroglo

People's Deputy of the Soviet Union
- In office 26 March 1989 – 5 September 1991
- Constituency: Bălți

Personal details
- Born: 24 November 1955 (age 70) Clocușna, Moldavian SSR, Soviet Union
- Party: Party Alliance Our Moldova; Alliance for European Integration (2009–present)
- Children: 2
- Profession: Engineer

Valeriu Cosarciuc (born 24 November 1955) is a Moldovan politician, who served as Deputy Prime Minister in the Dumitru Braghiș Cabinet (between 21 December 1999 and 19 April 2001), coordinating the government's activities in the field of industry, energy, agriculture, communications and the environment. He was the Minister of Agriculture and Food Industry in the First Vlad Filat Cabinet. He is a member of the Party Alliance Our Moldova.

== Biography ==
Valeriu Cosarciuc was born on 24 November 1955 in Clocușna, Ocnița District. He studied in 1972–1977 at the Polytechnic Institute of Chișinău (now Technical University of Moldova), obtaining a diploma of engineer specialized in machine building technology, lathes and tools. After graduating from the Faculty in 1977, he was employed as a technology engineer at the "Microprovod" in Chișinău. From 1980 he was transferred to the position of head of the technological group at "Moldselmaș" in the city of Bălți, being advanced in 1986 as the main technologist. Between 1989-1995 he served as head of the "Agroteh" factory of "Moldselmaș" and since 1995 he has been elected chairman of the Board of Directors of "Moldagrotehnica", whose task is to ensure effective economic and financial activity and enterprise development. During this time, he studied at the Academy of National Economy in Moscow (1990–1992).

In the preliminary parliamentary elections of 25 February 2001, he was elected a deputy on the list of the "BraghișAlliance", serving as vice-president of the Committee on Economy, Industry, Budget and Finance.

He is reelected as a deputy on the electoral roll from the Electoral Bloc Democratic Moldova at the parliamentary elections of 6 March 2005, becoming chairman of Parliament's Committee on Agriculture and Food Industry. Between 23 April 2001 – 25 August 2005 and 23 January 2006 he was the representative of the Republic of Moldova at the Parliamentary Assembly of the Council of Europe.

Besides Russian and Romanian, he also speaks English. He is married and has a son.
