= Ludmila Catlabuga =

Moldovan politician

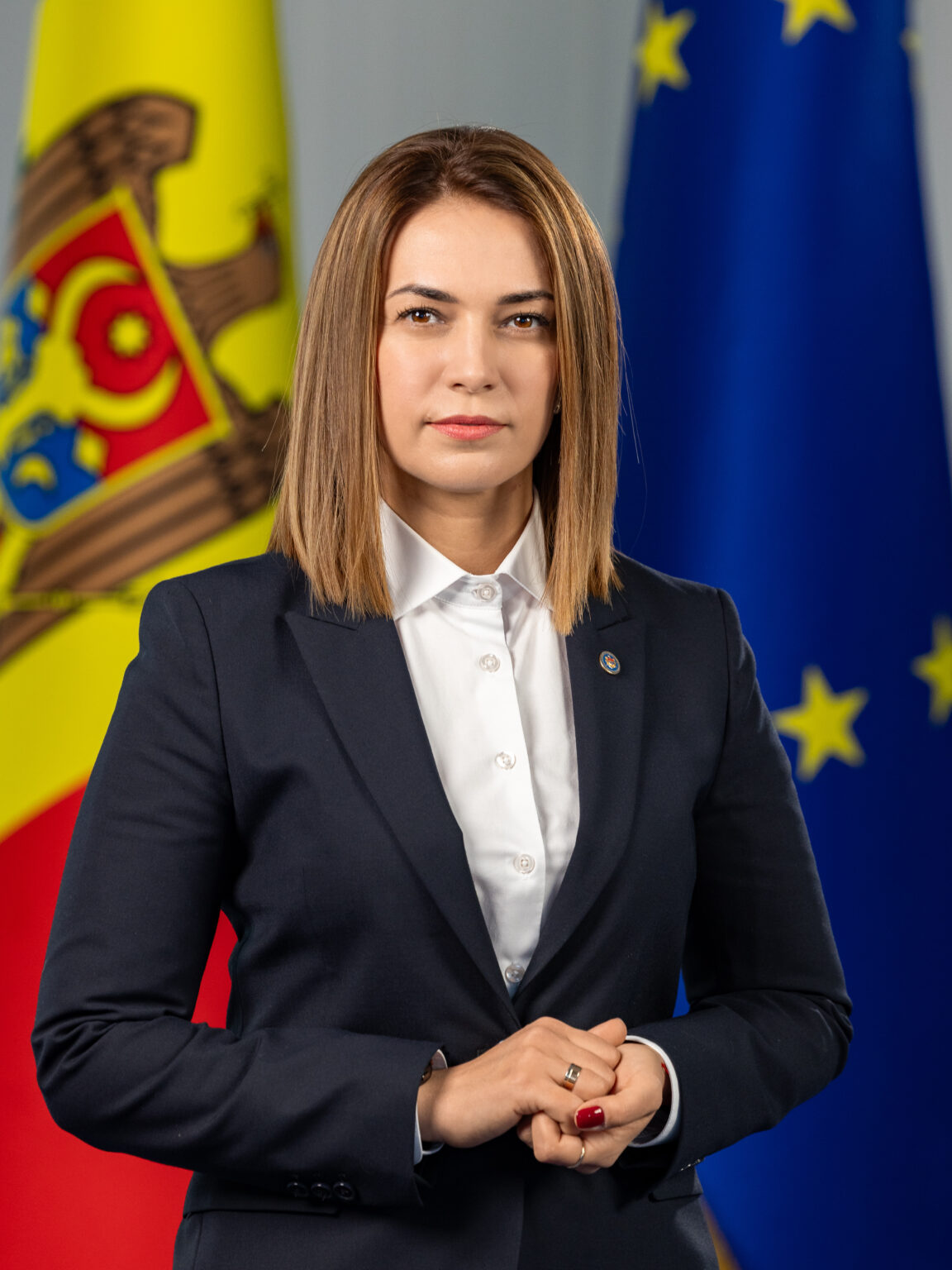
- Official portrait, 2025

Minister of Agriculture and Food Industry
- In office 19 November 2024 – 22 July 2026
- President: Maia Sandu
- Prime Minister: Dorin Recean; Alexandru Munteanu; Eugen Osmochescu (acting)
- Preceded by: Vladimir Bolea
- Succeeded by: Radu Musteața

Member of the Moldovan Parliament
- In office 22 October 2025 – 1 November 2025
- Succeeded by: Gheorghe Ichim
- Parliamentary group: Party of Action and Solidarity

Personal details
- Born: 10 July 1985 (age 41) Grigoriopol, Moldavian SSR, Soviet Union
- Education: Academy of Economic Studies of Moldova; Technical University of Moldova

Ludmila Catlabuga (born 10 July 1985) is a Moldovan politician who served as Minister of Agriculture and Food Industry in the Munteanu Cabinet.
