= Gradiște =

- Commune and village
- Location in Moldova
- Coordinates: 46°36′N 28°45′E
- Country: Moldova
- District: Cimișlia District

Area
  - Total: 17 sq mi (44 km^{2})

Population (2014)
  - Total: 2,109
  - Density: 120/sq mi (48/km^{2})
- Time zone: UTC+2 (EET)
  - Summer (DST): UTC+3 (EEST)

Gradiște is a commune in Cimișlia District. It is composed of two villages, Gradiște and Iurievca.

== Notable people ==
- Gheorghe Șalaru
