= Gheorghe Duca =

Moldovan academic and politician

Gheorghe Duca OR
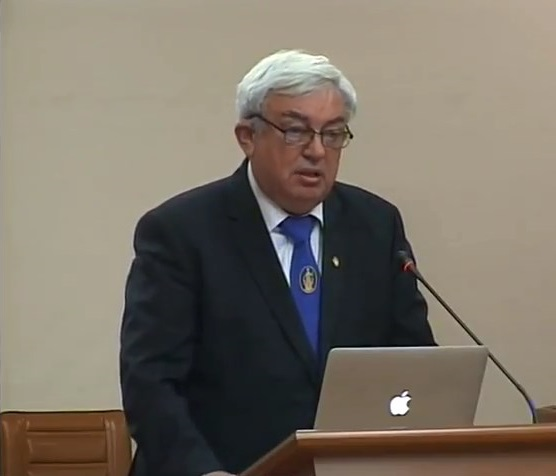
- Duca in 2018

President of the Academy of Sciences of Moldova
- In office 24 August 2004 – 28 November 2018
- Preceded by: Andrei Andrieş
- Succeeded by: Ion Tighineanu

Minister of Environment, Public Works and Regional Development
- In office 19 April 2001 – 5 February 2004
- President: Vladimir Voronin
- Prime Minister: Vasile Tarlev
- Preceded by: Ion Răileanu
- Succeeded by: Constantin Mihăilescu

Member of the Moldovan Parliament
- In office 22 March 1998 – 20 March 2001
- Parliamentary group: For a Democratic and Prosperous Moldova Electoral Bloc

Personal details
- Born: 29 February 1952 (age 74) Copăceni, Moldavian SSR, Soviet Union (now Moldova)
- Party: Democratic Convention of Moldova
- Spouse: Maria Duca
- Children: Doina Duca; Daniela Duca; Dragoș Duca
- Education: Moldova State University

Gheorghe Duca (born 29 February 1952) is a Moldovan academic and politician who is a former president of the Academy of Sciences of Moldova, an honorary member of the Romanian Academy, and former Moldovan Minister of Environment, Public Works and Regional Development.

== Early life ==
Gheorghe Duca was born on 29 February 1952 to Grigore and Nina Duca in the commune of Copăceni, Sîngerei District, while it was still under the domain of the Soviet Union (today it is in Moldova). From 1969 to 1974, Duca studied chemistry at the Moldova State University. During his time there, he became the secretary of the university's Komsomol organisation, which consisted of around 5000 members, and was later a member of the Communist Party of the Soviet Union.

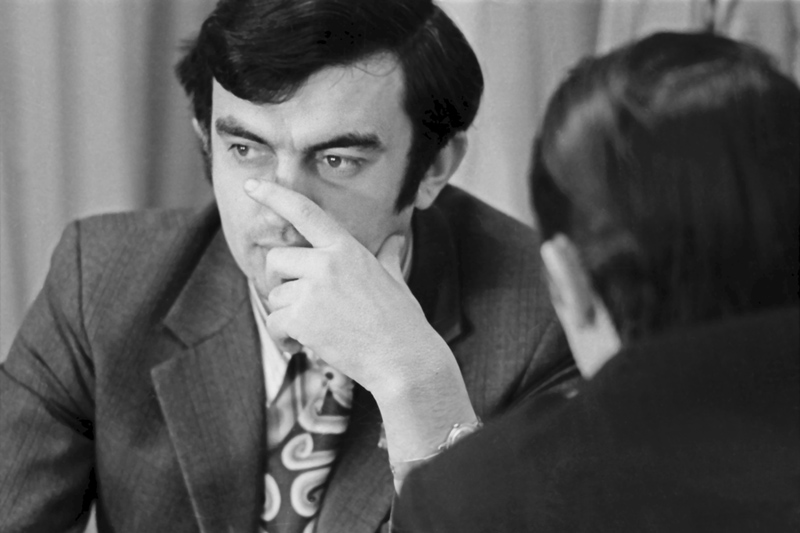
Duca in 1970

In 1974, following his graduation, he re-enrolled to study physical chemistry, earning a Doctor of Science degree specialized in the subject with a thesis titled "Cataliza oxidării acidului tartric și dihidroxifumaric" ("Catalysis of oxidation of tartaric acid and dihydroxyfumaric acid"). In 1983, he was awarded the Moldovan State Prize for Youth in Science and Technology.

Between 1985 and 1988, Duca attended a postdoctoral training course at the Institute of Physical Chemistry of the Russian Academy of Sciences. In 1989 he obtained a habilitation in environmental protection sciences from Odessa University, with a thesis titled "Mecanismele proceselor eco-chimice în mediu acvatic" ("Mechanisms of ecological chemical processes in the aquatic environment").

He immediately began a training course in environmental engineering at the Sapienza University of Rome, completing it by 1990. Duca continued to undertake such training courses around the world, participating in courses on: ecological management (EERO, the Netherlands, 1993), ecological impact assessment (Central European University, Budapest, 1996), ecological education (University of California, Riverside, 2000), managing programs (CRDF Global and National Science Foundation, West Virginia, 2000), and water and waste analysis (American Chemical Society, New Orleans, 2001).

== Career and later life ==
=== Academic career ===
As a member of the Communist Party, Duca was permitted to work in the Soviet Union's education system. Between 1982 and 2006 he advised 10 PhD students and continues to advise students in physical chemistry and environmental protection to this day. From 1988 to 1992 he headed the Faculty of Physical Chemistry at the Moldova State University, obtaining a teaching degree at the university in 1990. Duca also served as director of the Research Center for Industrial and Ecological Chemistry at the same university (1991 – 1998) and headed the Faculty of Ecology at the Free International University of Moldova (1992 – 1995).

Noted for his contributions to the fields of chemistry, physics, and environmental protection, Duca was appointed as chairman of the Republican Committee for Youth Awards in Science and Technology in 1992, a position he still holds. In the same year, he was elected as a correspondent member of the Academy of Sciences of Moldova—he became a full member in 2000, the same year he became honorary president of the Moldovan Research and Development Association.

=== Political career ===
In 1998, Duca was elected as a deputy (member) in the Parliament of the Republic of Moldova under the Braghiș Alliance—he served as president of the Committee on Culture, Science, Education and Mass Media of the Chişinău legislature until 2001. In 2000, he was named an honorary consul of Greece.

In a vote in Parliament on 19 April 2001, Duca was appointed to the Moldovan executive as Minister of Environment, Public Works and Regional Development in the First Tarlev Cabinet. As a minister, he voted against changing "Romanian language" to "Moldovan language" in the Moldovan education system, an issue that has long been a point of controversy in Moldova–Romania relations.

=== Return to academia ===
On 5 February 2004, he was elected president of the Academy of Science of Moldova and resigned from the government. By decree of the then-President of Moldova, Vladimir Voronin, Duca was appointed an ex officio member of the government, a position he still holds. In 2007, he was elected as an honorary member of the Romanian Academy, and, on 21 February 2008, was re-elected as president of the Academy of Sciences of Moldova—he is the academy's current president.

== Personal life ==
=== Family ===
Duca is married to Maria Duca (born 1956), a biologist specialised in pedology and plant genetics who is a correspondent member of the Academy of Sciences of Moldova. They have three children together: daughters Doina and Daniela, and son Dragoş.

== Honours ==
=== Foreign honours ===
- Poland: Commander's Cross of the Order of Merit of the Republic of Poland
- (Romania) Romanian Royal Family: Honorary Knight Commander of the Order of the Crown
- Romania: Order of "Cultural Merit"

=== Awards ===
- State Prize for Science, Technology and Production of the Republic of Moldova in 1995 and 2000;
- Honorary title of "Savant of the Year" in 2005 by the Academy of Sciences of Moldova and Banca de Economii;
