= Viorel Gherciu =

Moldovan politician (born 1969)

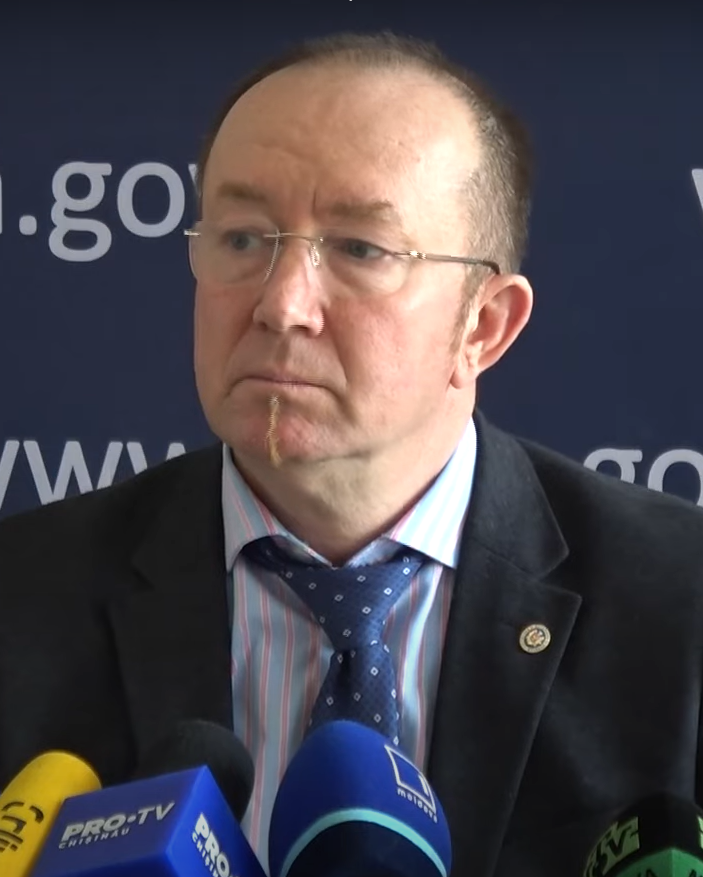
- Gherciu in 2022

Minister of Agriculture and Food Industry
- In office 6 August 2021 – 8 July 2022
- President: Maia Sandu
- Prime Minister: Natalia Gavrilița
- Preceded by: Ion Perju (as Minister of Agriculture, Regional Development and Environment)
- Succeeded by: Vladimir Bolea

Personal details
- Born: 29 November 1969 (age 56) Clișova, Moldavian SSR, Soviet Union
- Education: State Agrarian University of Moldova

Viorel Gherciu (pronunciation: [ˈɡertʃju]; born 29 November 1969) is a Moldovan politician. He was the Minister of Agriculture and Food Industry of the Republic of Moldova.
