= Sergiu Palihovici =

Moldovan politician (born 1971)

Secretary General of the Government of Moldova
- In office 5 August 2015 – 27 January 2016
- President: Nicolae Timofti
- Prime Minister: Valeriu Streleț; Gheorghe Brega (acting); Pavel Filip
- Preceded by: Victor Bodiu
- Succeeded by: Tudor Copaci

Minister of Environment
- In office 18 February 2015 – 30 July 2015
- President: Nicolae Timofti
- Prime Minister: Chiril Gaburici; Natalia Gherman (acting)
- Preceded by: Valentina Țapiș
- Succeeded by: Valeriu Munteanu

Member of the Chișinău Municipal Council
- In office 5 June 2011 – 25 October 2012

Personal details
- Born: 6 April 1971 (age 55) Vadul Rașcov, Moldavian SSR, Soviet Union
- Spouse: Liliana Palihovici
- Education: Moldova State University; Academy of Economic Studies of Moldova; Institut d'Etudes Politiques de Strasbourg

Sergiu Palihovici (born 6 April 1971) is a Moldovan jurist, historian and former politician. He held the office of Minister of Environment of Moldova in 2015.
