= Radu Musteața =

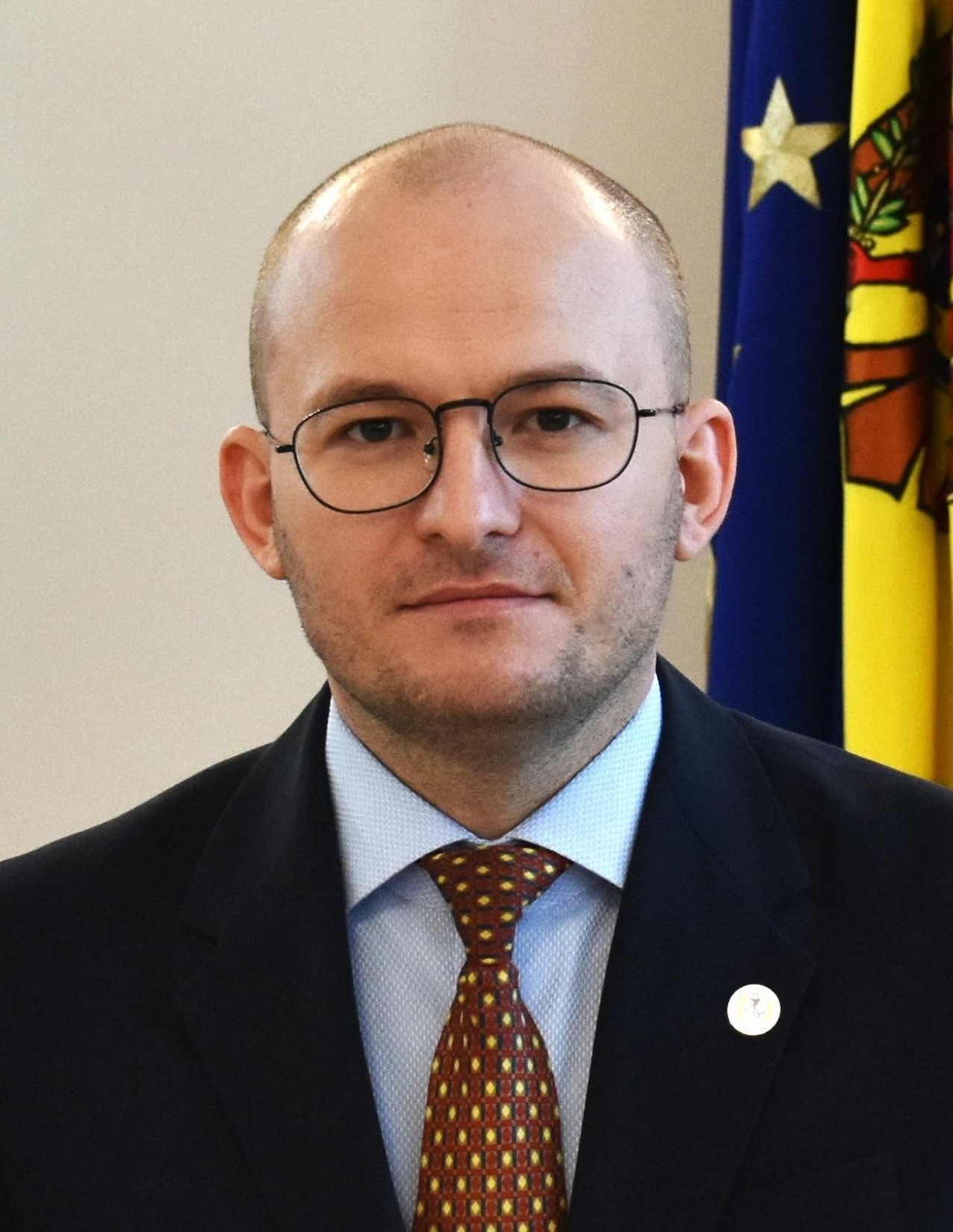
- Official portrait, 2025

Minister of Agriculture and Food Industry
- In office 22 July 2026 – 24 July 2026
- President: Maia Sandu
- Prime Minister: Vasile Tofan
- Preceded by: Ludmila Catlabuga
- Succeeded by: Eugen Osmochescu

Personal details
- Born: 24 October 1988 (age 37) Șaptebani, Moldavian SSR, Soviet Union
- Education: Moldova State University

Radu Musteața (born 24 October 1988) is a Moldovan chemist and environmental expert. He served as Director of the National Food Safety Agency and served as Minister of Agriculture and Food Industry in the Tofan Cabinet, until his resignation two days after appointment.
