= Vasile Bîtca =

Moldovan politician (born 1971)

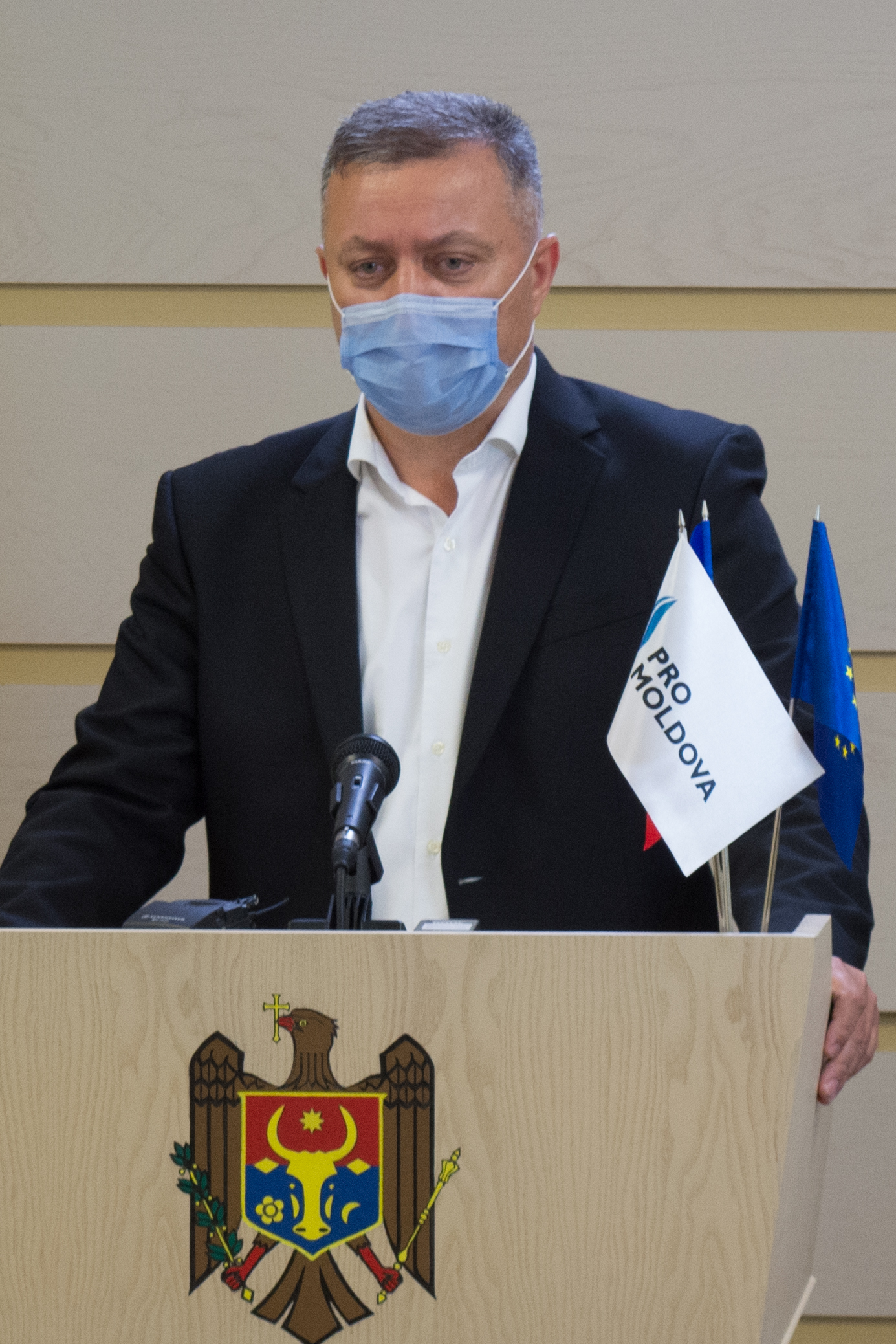
- Bîtca in 2020

Member of the Moldovan Parliament
- In office 9 March 2019 – 23 July 2021
- Parliamentary group: Democratic Party; Pro Moldova Party
- In office 9 December 2014 – 18 February 2015
- Parliamentary group: Democratic Party

Minister of Agriculture, Regional Development and Environment
- In office 25 July 2017 – 21 December 2017
- President: Igor Dodon
- Prime Minister: Pavel Filip
- Preceded by: Eduard Grama (as Minister of Agriculture and Food Industry)
- Succeeded by: Liviu Volconovici

Minister of Regional Development and Construction
- In office 18 February 2015 – 25 July 2017
- President: Nicolae Timofti; Igor Dodon
- Prime Minister: Chiril Gaburici; Natalia Gherman (acting); Valeriu Streleț; Gheorghe Brega (acting); Pavel Filip
- Preceded by: Marcel Răducan
- Succeeded by: Andrei Spînu (2021) (as Minister of Infrastructure and Regional Development)

Personal details
- Born: 1 December 1971 (age 54) Nisporeni, Moldavian SSR, Soviet Union
- Party: Pro Moldova
- Other political affiliations: Political Alliance for a European Moldova
- Education: Ştefan cel Mare Police Academy
- Occupation: Politician

Vasile Bîtca (born 1 December 1971) is a Moldovan politician who served as Minister of Agriculture, Regional Development and Environment from 18 February 2015 to 20 December 2017.

At the 2014 Moldovan parliamentary election he was elected as Member of Parliament of Moldova as candidate of the Democratic Party of Moldova, but in short time he left the office to become minister.

Between 2007 and 2011 Vasile Bîtca worked as Deputy Mayor of Nisporeni City, and between 2001 and 2015 he served as President of Nisporeni District.

Vasile Bîtca is married to Natalia Bîtcă, with whom he has four daughters.

On 18 May 2020, Bîtca joined, together with the politician Ghenadie Verdeș, the parliamentary group Pro Moldova, which became a political party on 22 June.

== Honours ==
He has been awarded with the following honours:

- Order "Credinţă Patriei", class III (2012)
- Medal "Crucea comemorativă. Participant la acțiunile de luptă pentru apărarea integrității și independenței Republicii Moldova (1991–1992)"
- Medal "Pentru Vitejie" (1992)
