= Clocușna =

- Village
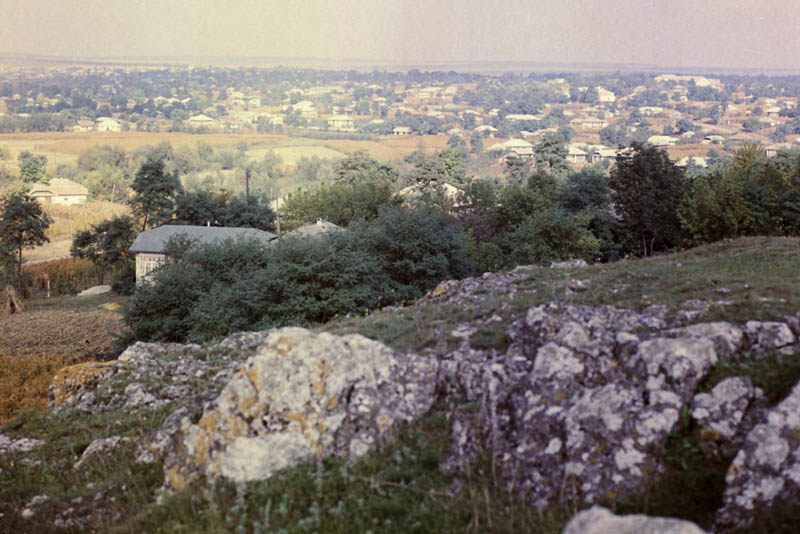
- Clocușna in 1970
- Interactive map of Clocușna
- Location in Moldova
- Coordinates: 48°26′N 27°20′E
- Country: Moldova
- District: Ocnița District

Population (2014 census)
  - Total: 2,093
- Time zone: UTC+2 (EET)
  - Summer (DST): UTC+3 (EEST)

Clocușna is a village in Ocnița District, Moldova.

== Notable people ==
- Valeriu Cosarciuc
- Emil Loteanu
