= Arcadie Capcelea =

Moldovan politician (born 1956)

1st Minister of Environment and Territorial Development
- In office 22 May 1998 – 5 September 2000
- President: Petru Lucinschi
- Prime Minister: Ion Ciubuc; Ion Sturza; Dumitru Braghiș
- Succeeded by: Ion Răileanu

Personal details
- Born: 30 January 1956 (age 70) Izvoare, Moldavian SSR, Soviet Union

Arcadie Capcelea (born 30 January 1956) is a Moldovan professor and politician. He served as the Minister of Environment of Moldova from 1998 to 2000.
