= Eduard Grama =

Minister of Agriculture and Food Industry
- In office 20 January 2016 – 20 March 2017
- President: Nicolae Timofti; Igor Dodon
- Prime Minister: Pavel Filip
- Preceded by: Ion Sula
- Succeeded by: Vasile Bîtca (as Minister of Agriculture, Regional Development and Environment)

Deputy Minister of Agriculture and Food Industry
- In office 20 May 2015 – 20 January 2016
- President: Nicolae Timofti
- Prime Minister: Chiril Gaburici; Natalia Gherman (acting); Valeriu Streleț; Gheorghe Brega (acting)
- Minister: Ion Sula

Personal details
- Born: 27 May 1973 (age 52)

Eduard Grama (born 27 May 1973) is a Moldovan manager and former politician. He served as the Minister of Agriculture of Moldova from 2016 to 2017.
