= Chiriet-Lunga =

Chiriet-Lunga Kiriyet
- Commune
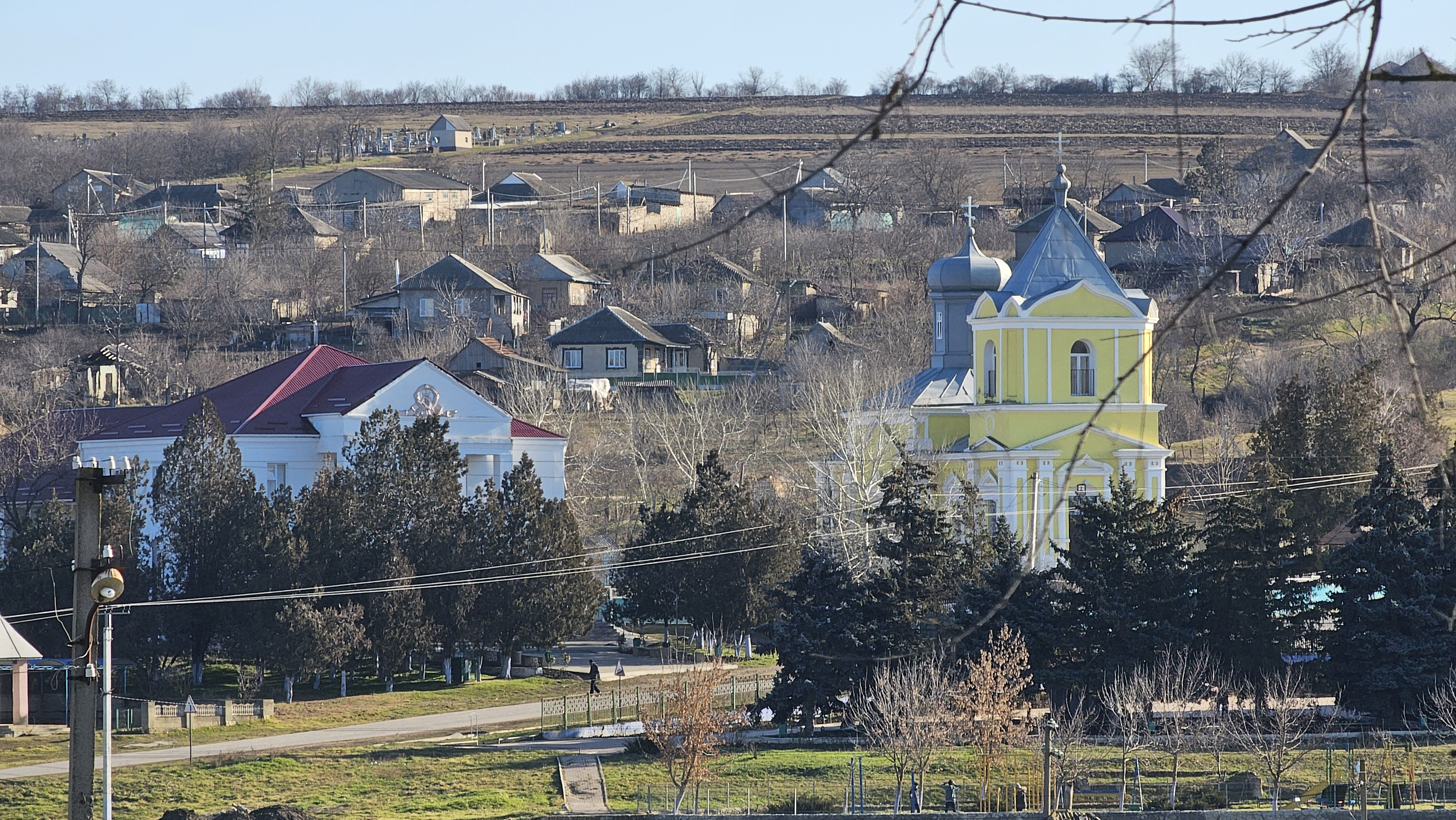
- View of Chiriet-Lunga' House of Culture (left) and St. Nicolai Church (right).

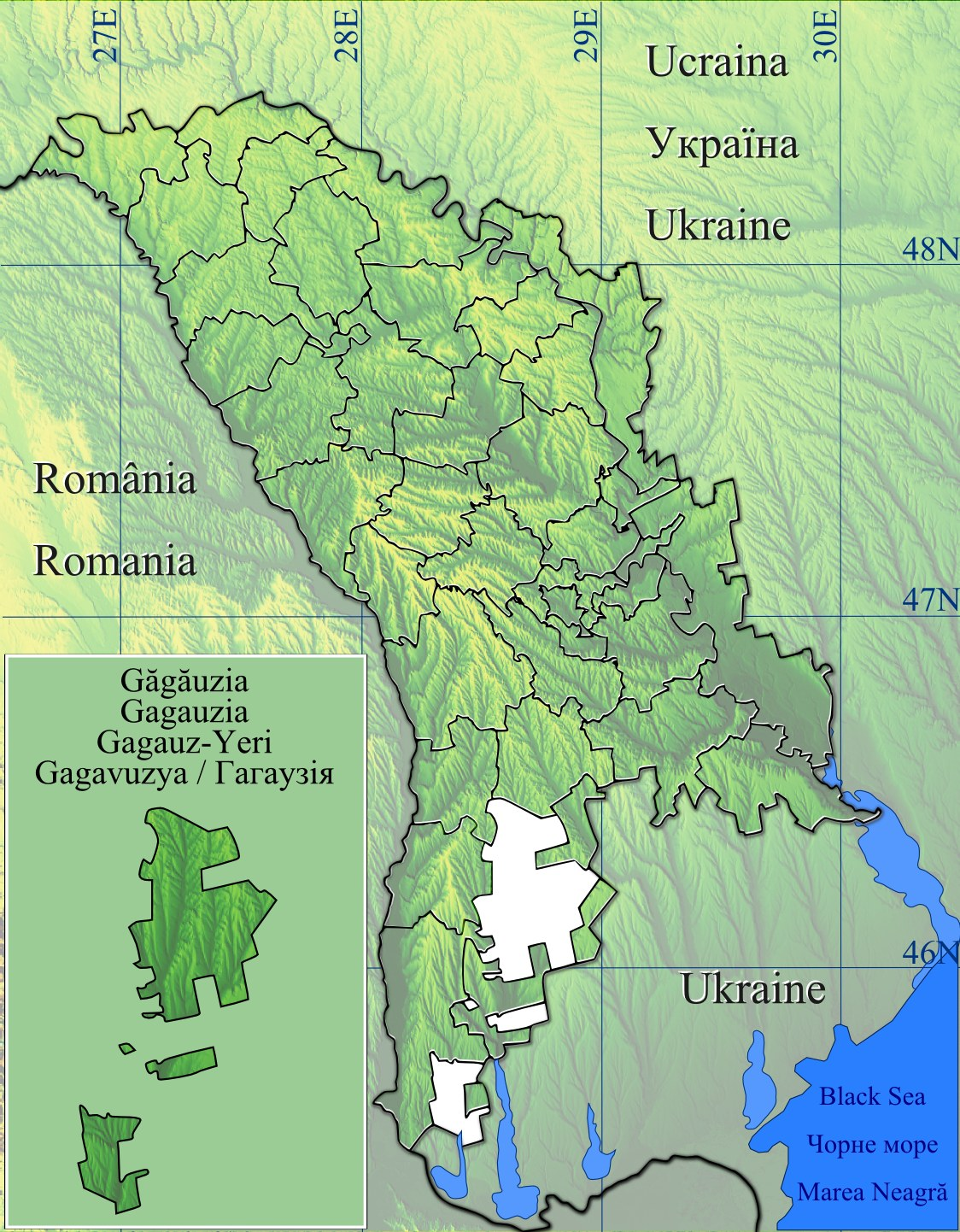
- Location of Congaz in Moldova
- Coordinates: 46°12′30″N 28°56′33″E
- Country: Moldova
- Autonomous Region: Gagauzia
- Founded: 1794

Government
  - Mayor: Valentina Kaiky

Population (2024)
  - Total: 1,251

Ethnicity (2024 census)
  - Gagauz people: 90.96%
  - Moldovans: 3.35%
  - other: 5.69%
- Time zone: UTC+2 (EET)
- Climate: Cfb
- Website: chirietlunga.md

Chiriet-Lunga (Gagauz: Kiriyet) is a commune and village in the Ceadîr-Lunga district, Gagauz Autonomous Territorial Unit of the Republic of Moldova. According to the 2024 Moldovan census the commune has 1,251 people, 1,138 (90.96%) of them being Gagauz.

== History ==
The village was initially settled in by the Gagauz in 1794, the families came from Bulgaria and founded the village near the settlement of the Tatar Kiriyet tribe. Only after the 1830s the name was modified to be Chiriet-Lunga. In 1861 the St. Nicolai Church was built with the contributions from the locals.

== International relations ==
=== Twin towns — Sister cities ===
Chiriet-Lunga is twinned with:

- Serpneve, Ukraine;

== Notable people ==
People from Chiriet-Lunga include:

- Ivan Burgudzhi (born 1953), Gagauz publicist and activist
- Dionis Tanasoglu (1922–2006), Gagauz poet and writer
- Nikolay Tanasoglu (1895–1970) Gagauz writer and teacher
- Dmitri Todoroglo (born 1944), Moldovan Minister of Agriculture and Food Industry, 2001–2005
