= Ion Sula =

Moldovan politician

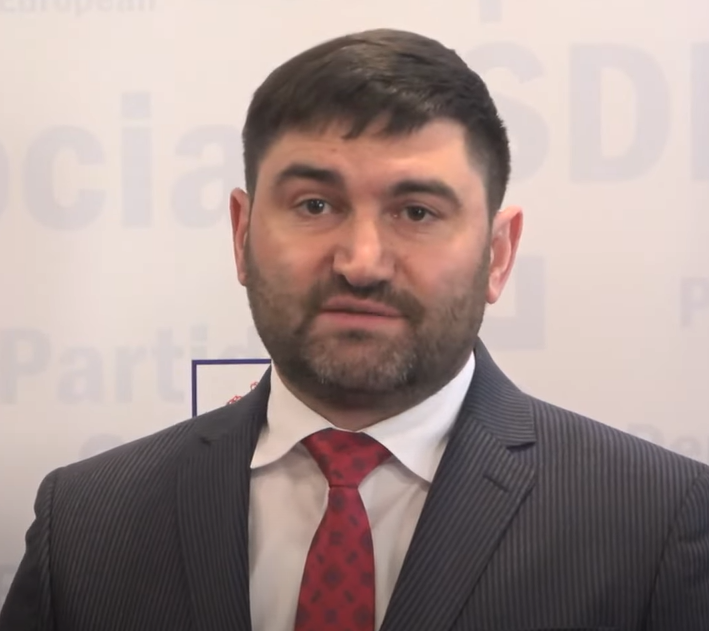
- Sula in 2023

President of the European Social Democratic Party
- In office 20 November 2022 – 22 December 2024
- Preceded by: Pavel Filip (as President of the Democratic Party)
- Succeeded by: Tudor Ulianovschi

Minister of Agriculture and Food Industry
- In office 18 February 2015 – 20 January 2016
- President: Nicolae Timofti
- Prime Minister: Chiril Gaburici; Natalia Gherman (acting); Valeriu Streleț; Gheorghe Brega (acting)
- Preceded by: Vasile Bumacov
- Succeeded by: Eduard Grama

Deputy Minister of Agriculture and Food Industry
- In office 10 July 2013 – 29 January 2014
- President: Nicolae Timofti
- Prime Minister: Iurie Leancă
- Minister: Vasile Bumacov

Personal details
- Born: 10 August 1980 (age 46) Costești, Moldavian SSR, Soviet Union
- Party: European Social Democratic Party; Liberal Democratic Party of Moldova
- Education: State Agrarian University of Moldova

Ion Sula (born 10 August 1980) is a Moldovan politician who served as Minister of Agriculture and Food Industry of Moldova since 18 February 2015, succeeding at this post Vasile Bumacov (2011-2015), until 20 January 2016.

Ion Sula is married and has two children.
