= Nicolae Ciubuc =

Moldovan politician (born 1980)

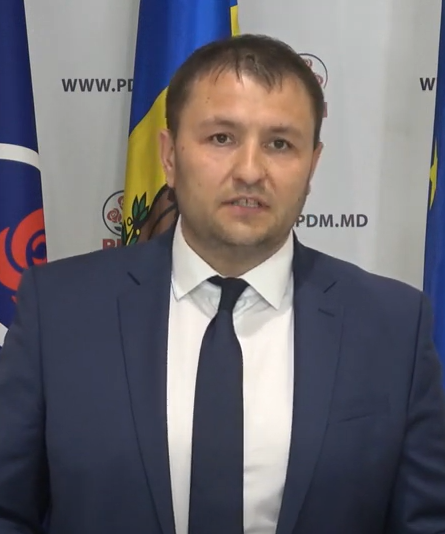
- Ciubuc in 2021

Member of the Moldovan Parliament
- In office 9 March 2019 – 23 July 2021
- Parliamentary group: Democratic Party
- Constituency: Călărași
- Majority: 10,549 (37.7%)

Minister of Agriculture, Regional Development and Environment
- In office 25 September 2018 – 8 June 2019
- President: Igor Dodon
- Prime Minister: Pavel Filip
- Preceded by: Liviu Volconovici
- Succeeded by: Georgeta Mincu

Personal details
- Born: 13 December 1980 (age 45) Sadova, Moldavian SSR, Soviet Union

Nicolae Ciubuc (born 13 December 1980) is a Moldovan politician. He served as Minister of Agriculture, Regional Development and Environment from 25 September 2018 to 8 June 2019. Georgeta Mincu was appointed as his successor.

He previously served as director of the Intervention and Payment Agency for Agriculture.

Political offices
Preceded by Liviu Volconovici	Minister of Agriculture, Regional Development and Environment; 2018–2019	Succeeded by Georgeta Mincu
