= Gheorghe Hajder =

Moldovan public official (born 1995)

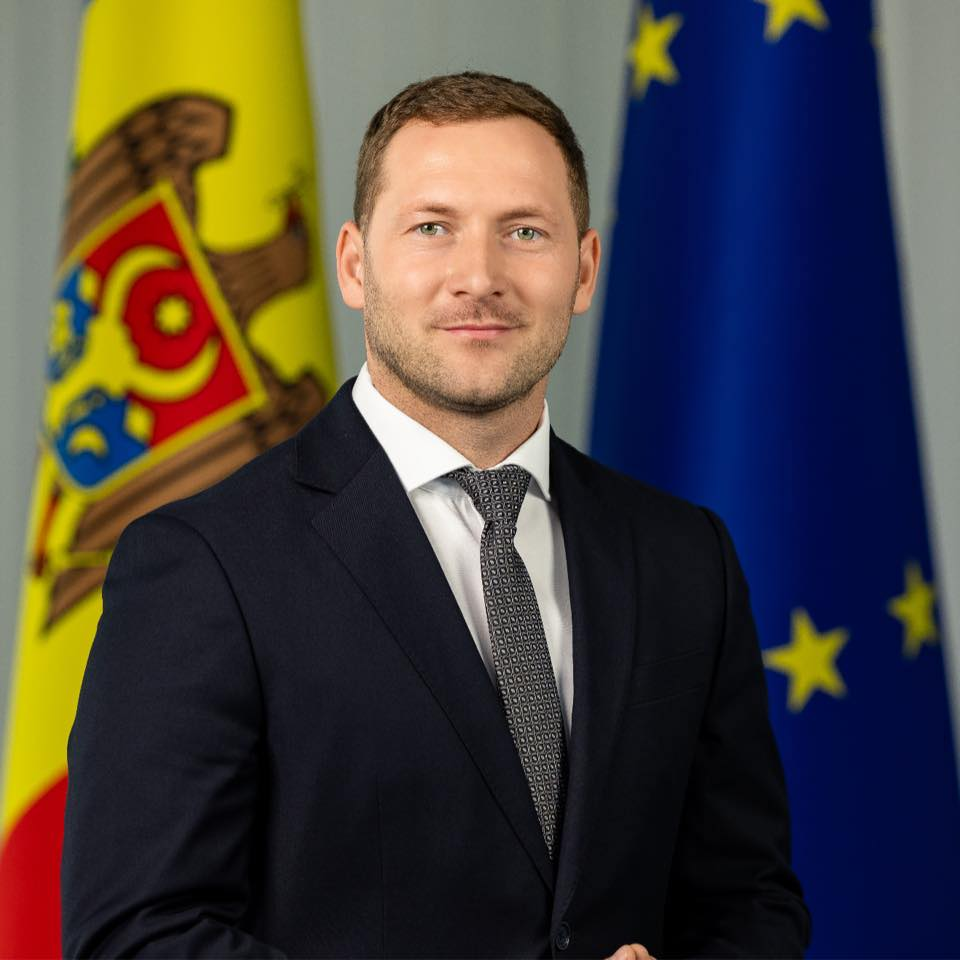
- Official portrait, 2025

Minister of Environment
- Incumbent
- Assumed office 1 November 2025
- President: Maia Sandu
- Prime Minister: Alexandru Munteanu; Eugen Osmochescu (acting); Vasile Tofan
- Preceded by: Sergiu Lazarencu

Secretary of State of the Ministry of Environment
- In office 3 April 2024 – 1 November 2025
- President: Maia Sandu
- Prime Minister: Dorin Recean
- Minister: Sergiu Lazarencu

Deputy Mayor of Stăuceni
- In office 13 September 2021 – 1 May 2023

Personal details
- Born: 25 January 1995 (age 31)
- Education: Academy of Economic Studies of Moldova

Gheorghe Hajder (born 25 January 1995) is a Moldovan economist, currently serving as Minister of Environment of Moldova.
