= Copăceni, Sîngerei =

Copăceni
- Commune
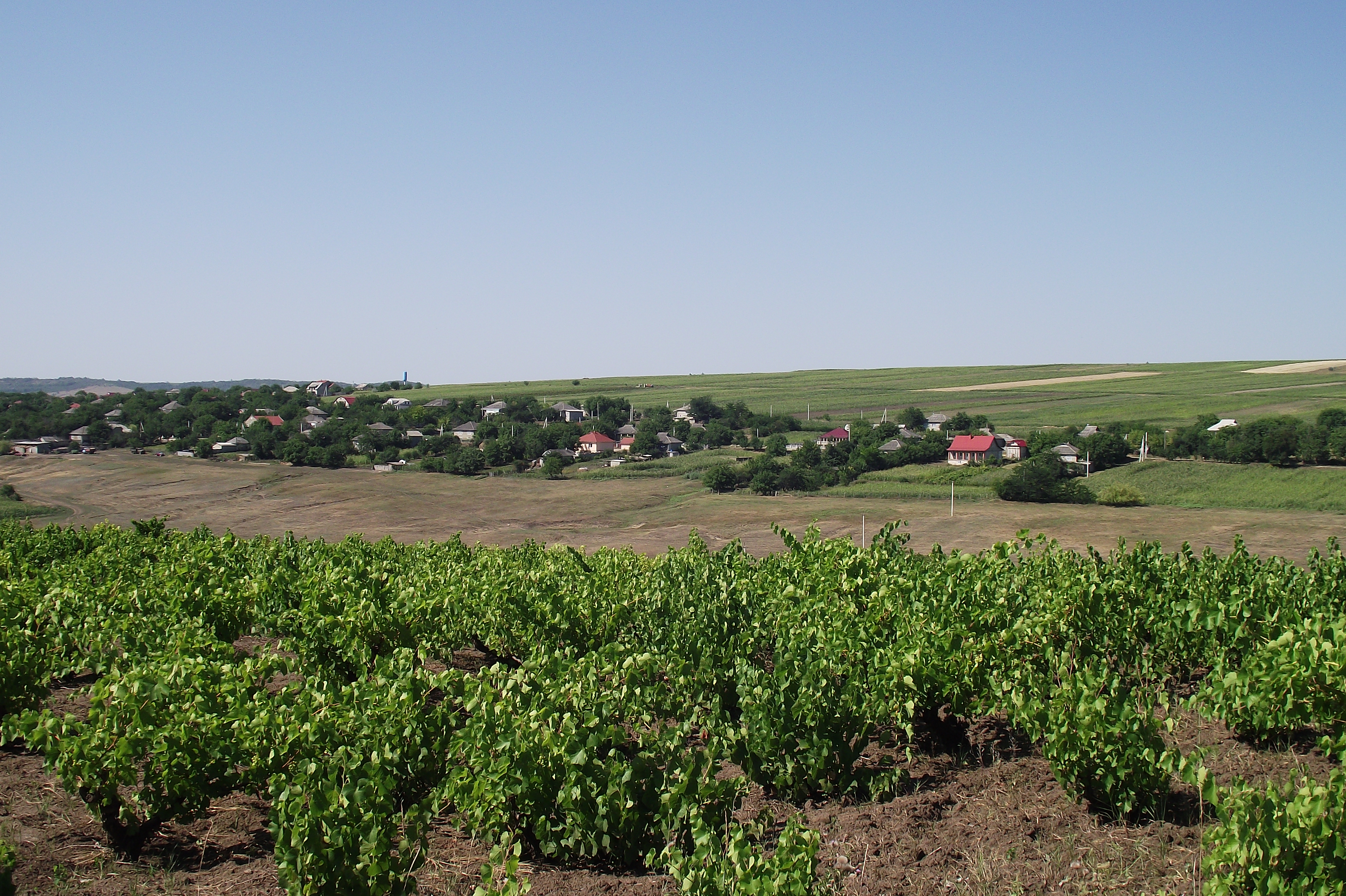

- Location in Moldova
- Coordinates: 47°37′N 28°14′E
- Country: Moldova
- District: Sângerei District

Population (2014)
  - Total: 2,613
- Time zone: UTC+2 (EET)
  - Summer (DST): UTC+3 (EEST)

Copăceni is a commune in Sîngerei District, Moldova. It is composed of six villages: Antonovca, Copăceni, Evghenievca, Gavrilovca, Petrovca and Vladimireuca (formerly Vladimirești).

== Notable people ==
- Adrian Păunescu
- Gheorghe Duca
