= Dmitri Todoroglo =

Moldovan politician (born 1944)

Dmitri Todoroglo OR

Member of the Moldovan Parliament
- In office 20 March 2005 – 24 December 2010
- Parliamentary group: Party of Communists
- In office 31 May 1995 – 19 April 2001
- Preceded by: Victor Morev
- Parliamentary group: Socialist Party; Party of Communists

Deputy Prime Minister of Moldova
- In office 19 April 2001 – 19 April 2005 Serving with Andrei Cucu, Ștefan Odagiu and Andrei Stratan
- President: Vladimir Voronin
- Prime Minister: Vasile Tarlev
- Preceded by: Valeriu Cosarciuc

Minister of Agriculture and Food Industry
- In office 19 April 2001 – 19 April 2005
- President: Vladimir Voronin
- Prime Minister: Vasile Tarlev
- Preceded by: Ion Russu (as Minister of Agriculture and Manufacturing Industry)
- Succeeded by: Anatolie Gorodenco

Personal details
- Born: 25 November 1944 (age 81) Chiriet-Lunga, Moldavian SSR, Soviet Union

Dmitri Todoroglo (born 25 November 1944) is a Moldovan politician who held the office of Minister of Agriculture of Moldova in the 1st Tarlev Cabinet.
