= Liviu Volconovici =

Moldovan agronomist and politician (1956–2026)

Rector of the State Agrarian University of Moldova
- In office 1 October 2018 – 26 November 2021
- Succeeded by: Veronica Prisăcaru
- In office 20 June 2017 – 10 January 2018
- Preceded by: Gheorghe Cimpoieș

Minister of Agriculture, Regional Development and Environment
- In office 10 January 2018 – 18 September 2018
- President: Igor Dodon
- Prime Minister: Pavel Filip
- Preceded by: Vasile Bîtca
- Succeeded by: Nicolae Ciubuc

Personal details
- Born: 21 May 1956
- Died: 6 May 2026 (aged 69)
- Education: State Agrarian University of Moldova

Liviu Volconovici (21 May 1956 – 6 May 2026) was a Moldovan agronomist, academic and politician. He held the office of Minister of Agriculture, Regional Development and Environment in the Filip Cabinet. Volconovici died on 6 May 2026, at the age of 69.
