= Ministry of Agriculture and Food Industry =

Government ministry of Moldova

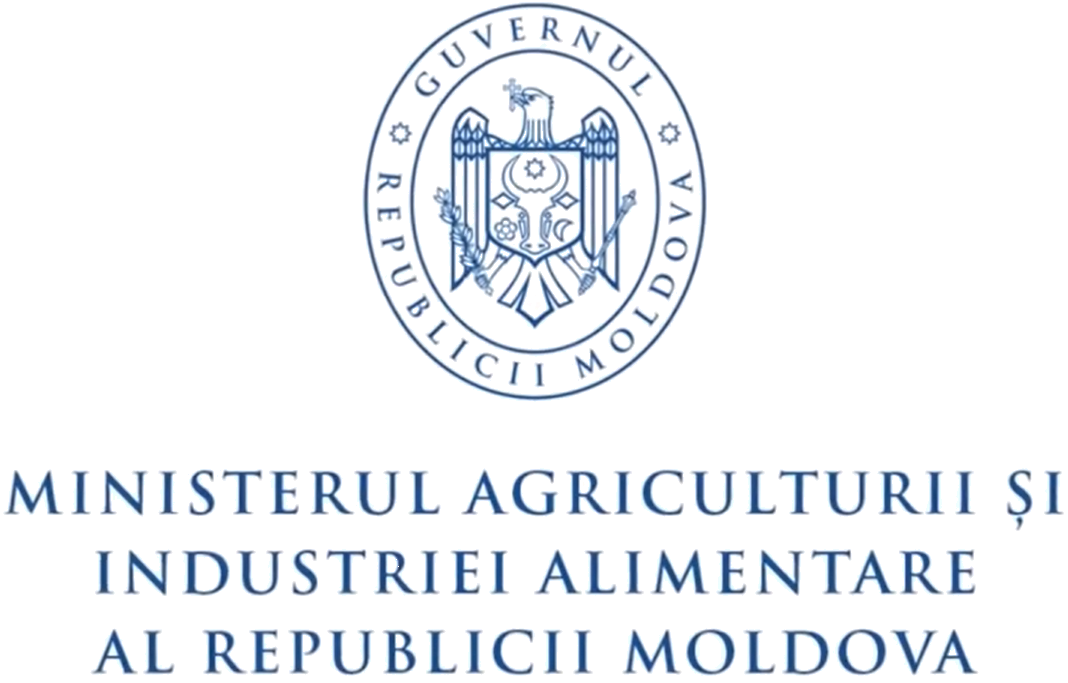

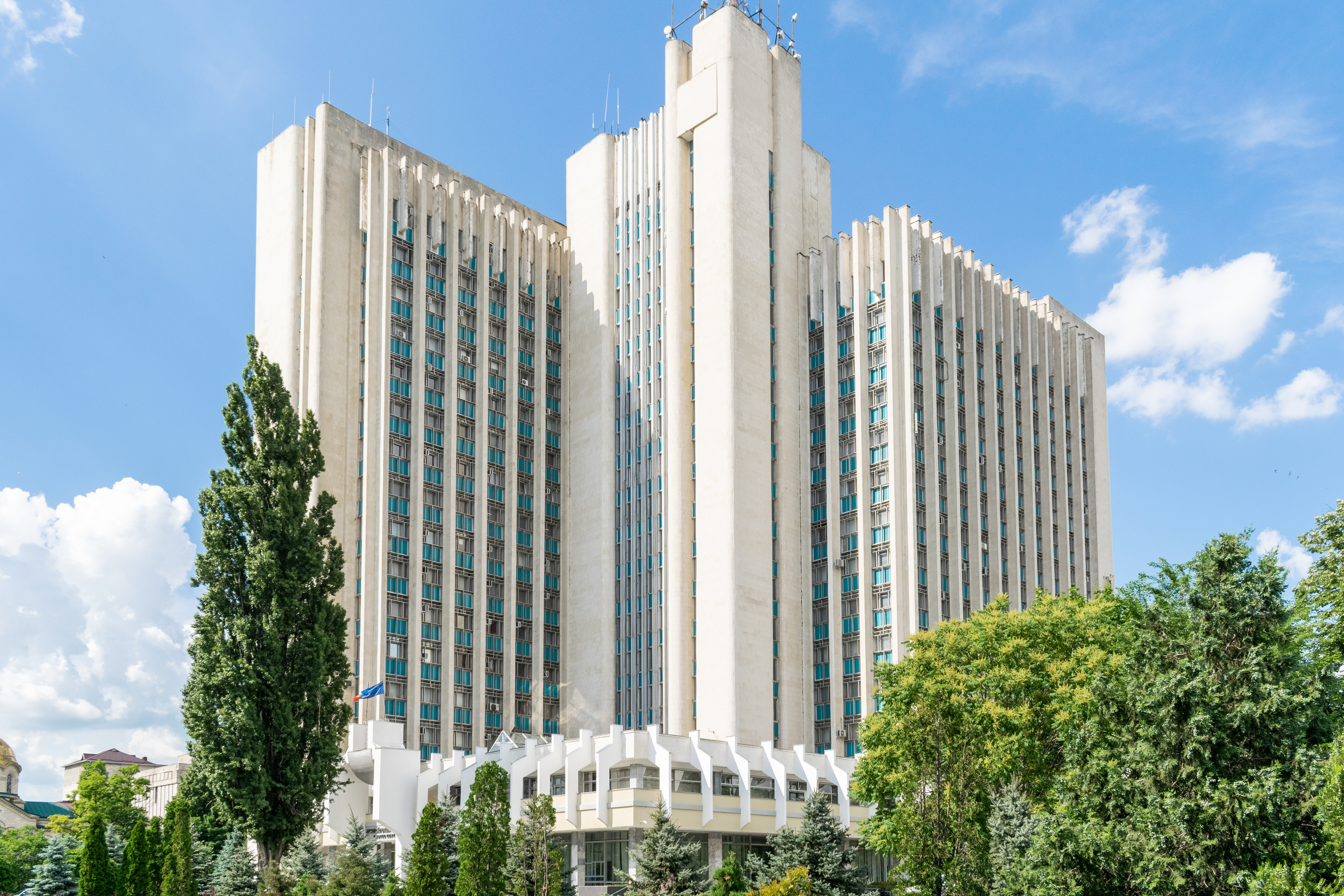
- Headquarters in Chișinău

Ministry overview
- Formed: 6 June 1990; 36 years ago
- Preceding agencies: Ministry of Agriculture, Regional Development and Environment; Ministry of Agriculture and Manufacturing Industry; Ministry of Agriculture and Alimentation
- Jurisdiction: Government of Moldova
- Headquarters: 162 Stephen the Great Boulevard, Chișinău
- Minister responsible: Eugen Osmochescu, Minister of Agriculture and Food Industry
- Ministry executive: Sergiu Gherciu, Secretary General; Andrian Digolean, Secretary of State; Vasile Șarban, Secretary of State
- Website: maia.gov.md

The Ministry of Agriculture and Food Industry (Romanian: Ministerul Agriculturii și Industriei Alimentare) is one of the fourteen Moldovan ministries, being the central body of public administration, subordinated to the Government. It has the mission to ensure the realization of the constitutional prerogatives of the Government in the development and promotion of state policy of sustainable development of Agro-industrial sector of the country, by increasing competitiveness and productivity in the sector and ensuring the safety and food sufficiency in the country in order to create the premises for permanent increase in welfare. The current minister is Eugen Osmochescu.

A monument dedicated to Moldovan wine (Vinul Moldovei) is installed in front of the ministry building. The sculpture, created by artist Veaceslav Jiglitchi, symbolizes the importance of winemaking, which is a fundamental sector of Moldova’s agriculture.

== List of ministers ==
No.	Portrait	Name (Birth–Death)	Office term		Notes	Cabinet
1		Andrei Sangheli (born 1944)	6 June 1990	1 July 1992	First Deputy Prime Minister	Druc Muravschi
2		Vitalie Gorincioi (born 1953)	30 August 1992	24 January 1997		Sangheli I-II
3		Gheorghe Lungu (born 1949)	24 January 1997	22 May 1998		Ciubuc I
4		Valeriu Bulgari (born 1956)	22 May 1998	21 December 1999		Ciubuc II Sturza
5		Ion Russu (born 1941)	21 December 1999	19 April 2001		Braghiș
6		Dmitri Todoroglo (born 1944)	19 April 2001	19 April 2005	Deputy Prime Minister	Tarlev I
7		Anatolie Gorodenco (born 1958)	19 April 2005	25 September 2009		Tarlev II Greceanîi I-II
8		Valeriu Cosarciuc (born 1955)	25 September 2009	14 January 2011		Filat I
9		Vasile Bumacov (born 1957)	14 January 2011	18 February 2015		Filat II Leancă
10		Ion Sula (born 1980)	18 February 2015	20 January 2016		Gaburici Streleț
11		Eduard Grama (born 1973)	20 January 2016	20 March 2017		Filip
12		Vasile Bîtca (born 1971)	26 July 2017	21 December 2017		Filip
13		Liviu Volconovici (1956–2026)	10 January 2018	18 September 2018		Filip
14		Nicolae Ciubuc (born 1980)	25 September 2018	8 June 2019		Filip
15		Georgeta Mincu (born 1971)	8 June 2019	14 November 2019		Sandu
16		Ion Perju (born 1971)	14 November 2019	6 August 2021		Chicu
17		Viorel Gherciu (born 1969)	6 August 2021	8 July 2022		Gavrilița
18		Vladimir Bolea (born 1971)	8 July 2022	19 November 2024	Deputy Prime Minister	Gavrilița Recean
19		Ludmila Catlabuga (born 1985)	19 November 2024	22 July 2026		Recean Munteanu
20		Radu Musteața (born 1988)	22 July 2026	24 July 2026		Tofan
21		Eugen Osmochescu (born 1972)	28 August 2026	Incumbent		Tofan
