= Gheorghe Șalaru =

Moldovan politician (born 1961)

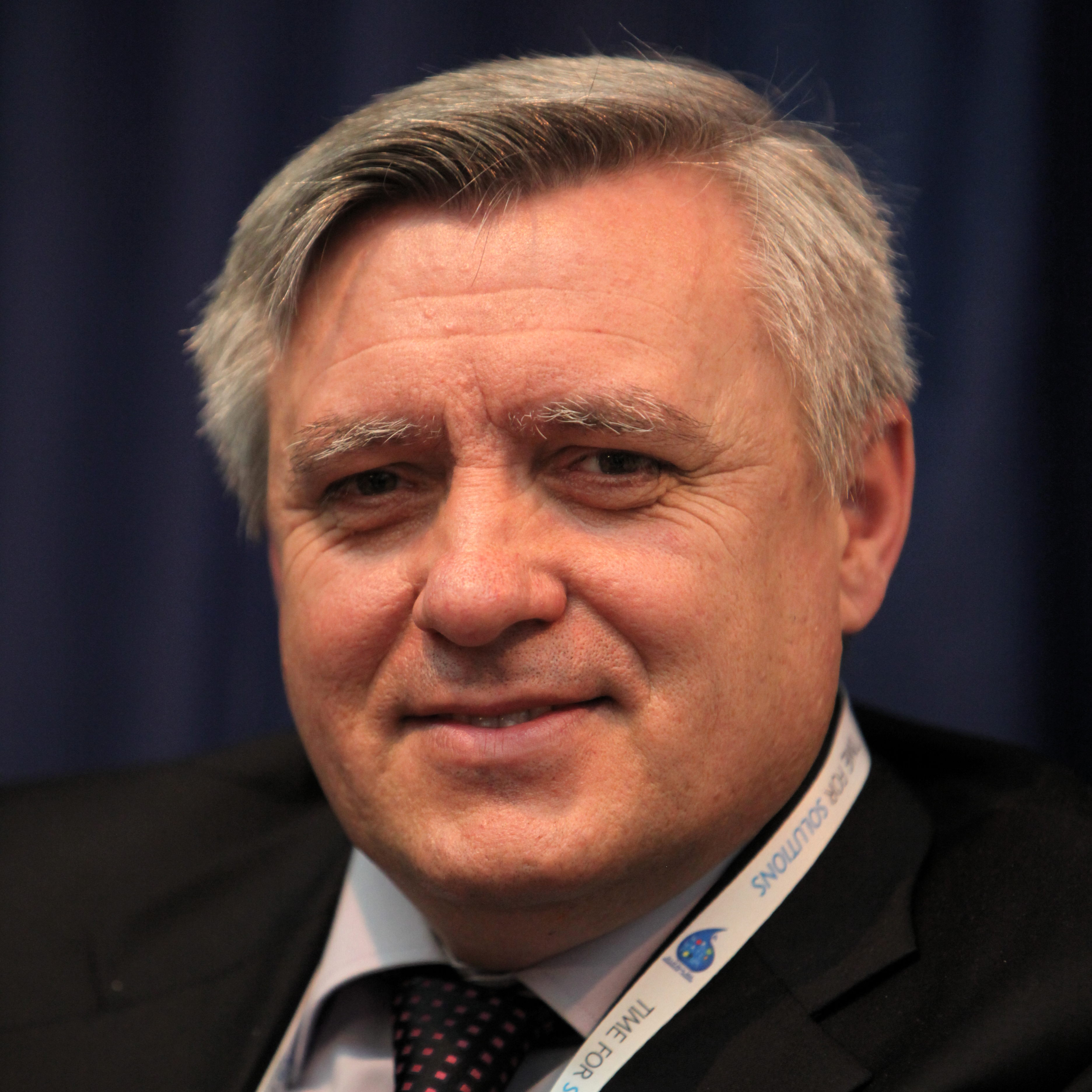
- Șalaru in 2012

Minister of Environment
- In office 25 September 2009 – 5 June 2014
- President: Mihai Ghimpu (acting); Vladimir Filat (acting); Marian Lupu (acting); Nicolae Timofti
- Prime Minister: Vladimir Filat; Iurie Leancă
- Preceded by: Violeta Ivanov
- Succeeded by: Valentina Țapiș

Personal details
- Born: 14 November 1961 (age 64) Gradiște, Moldavian SSR, Soviet Union
- Party: Liberal Party (2009–present); Alliance for European Integration (2009–2013)
- Profession: Historian

Gheorghe Șalaru (born 14 November 1961) is a Moldovan politician. He was the Environment Minister in the First Vlad Filat Cabinet and in the Second Filat Cabinet.

== Biography ==
He is a member of the Liberal Party (PL).
