= Anatolie Gorodenco =

Moldovan politician (born 1958)

Minister of Agriculture and Food Industry
- In office 19 April 2005 – 25 September 2009
- President: Vladimir Voronin; Mihai Ghimpu (acting)
- Prime Minister: Vasile Tarlev; Zinaida Greceanîi; Vitalie Pîrlog (acting)
- Preceded by: Dmitri Todoroglo
- Succeeded by: Valeriu Cosarciuc

Personal details
- Born: 5 November 1958 (age 67) Viișoara, Moldavian SSR, Soviet Union

Anatolie Gorodenco (born 5 November 1958) is a Moldovan politician who served as the Minister of Agriculture of Moldova from 2005 to 2009.
