= Georgeta Mincu =

Moldovan politician (born 1971)

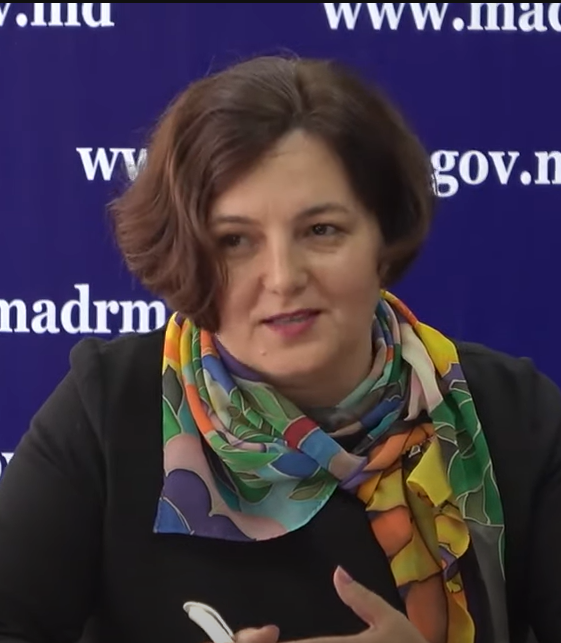
- Mincu in 2019

Minister of Agriculture, Regional Development and Environment
- In office 8 June 2019 – 14 November 2019
- President: Igor Dodon
- Prime Minister: Maia Sandu
- Preceded by: Nicolae Ciubuc
- Succeeded by: Ion Perju

Personal details
- Born: 28 May 1971 (age 54) Alexandru Ioan Cuza, Moldavian SSR, Soviet Union

Georgeta Mincu (born 28 May 1971) is a Moldovan politician. She served as Minister of Agriculture, Regional Development and Environment from 8 June 2019 to 14 November 2019 in the cabinet of Prime Minister Maia Sandu.

Political offices
| Preceded by Nicolae Ciubuc | Minister of Agriculture, Regional Development and Environment; 2019–2019 | Succeeded by Ion Perju |
