= Ministry of Environment (Moldova) =

Government ministry of Moldova

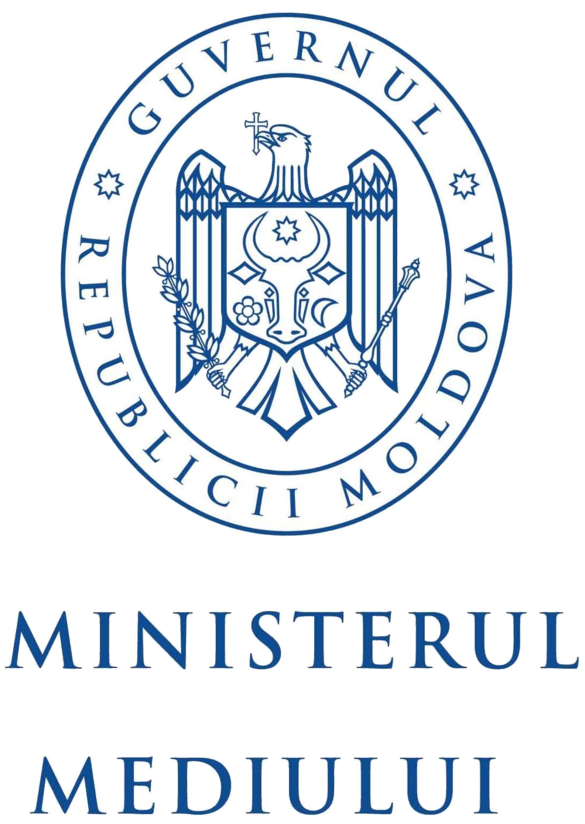

Ministry overview
- Formed: 22 May 1998; 28 years ago (as Ministry of Environment and Territorial Development)
- Preceding agencies: Ministry of Agriculture, Regional Development and Environment; Ministry of Ecology and Natural Resources; Ministry of Ecology, Construction and Territorial Development
- Jurisdiction: Government of Moldova
- Headquarters: 162 Stephen the Great Boulevard, Chișinău
- Minister responsible: Gheorghe Hajder, Minister of Environment
- Ministry executives: Petru Tataru, Secretary General; Grigore Stratulat, Secretary of State; Aliona Rusnac, Secretary of State; Victoria Gratii, Secretary of State
- Website: mediu.gov.md

The Ministry of Environment (Romanian: Ministerul Mediului) is one of the fourteen ministries of the Government of Moldova.

== List of ministers ==
No.	Portrait	Name (Birth–Death)	Office term		Cabinet
1		Arcadie Capcelea (born 1956)	22 May 1998	5 September 2000	Ciubuc II Sturza Braghiș
2		Ion Răileanu (born 1948)	5 September 2000	19 April 2001	Braghiș
3		Gheorghe Duca (born 1952)	19 April 2001	5 February 2004	Tarlev I
4		Constantin Mihăilescu (born 1959)	19 March 2004	27 February 2008	Tarlev I-II
5		Violeta Ivanov (born 1967)	31 March 2008	25 September 2009	Greceanîi I-II
6		Gheorghe Șalaru (born 1961)	25 September 2009	5 June 2014	Filat I-II Leancă
7		Valentina Țapiș (born 1963)	6 June 2014	18 February 2015	Leancă
8		Sergiu Palihovici (born 1971)	18 February 2015	30 July 2015	Gaburici
9		Valeriu Munteanu (born 1980)	30 July 2015	30 May 2017	Streleț Filip
10		Iuliana Cantaragiu (born 1975)	6 August 2021	8 September 2022	Gavrilița
11		Rodica Iordanov (born 1976)	16 November 2022	13 March 2024	Gavrilița Recean
12		Sergiu Lazarencu (born 1985)	14 March 2024	1 November 2025	Recean
13		Gheorghe Hajder (born 1995)	1 November 2025	Incumbent	Munteanu Tofan
