= Denmark–Moldova relations =

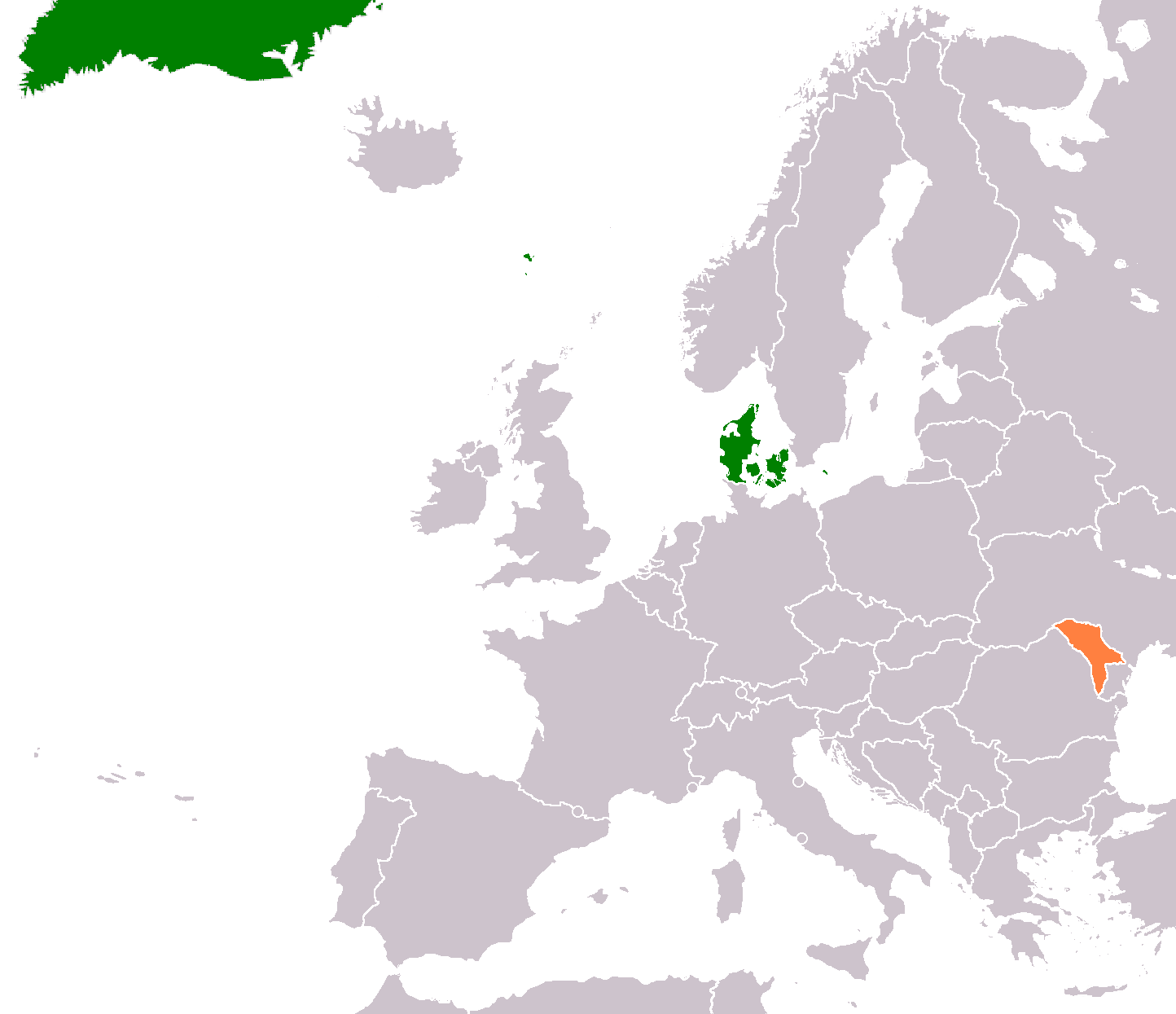

- Denmark: Moldova

Denmark–Moldova relations refers to the current and historical relations between Denmark and Moldova. Neither country has a resident ambassador. The Moldovan Ambassador to Denmark is Igor Corman, who resides in Berlin and was appointed in 2005. The Danish Ambassador in Moldova is Ole Harald Lisborg, who resides in Bucharest. Denmark is a member of the EU, which Moldova applied for in 2022. Both countries are full members of Council of Europe.

== History ==
The Republic of Moldova and the Kingdom of Denmark established diplomatic relations on January 20, 1992. The Kingdom of Denmark recognized the independence of Moldova on December 31, 1991. On 22 April 2009, a Danish House opened in Chisinau. the house is as per 2017 not existing anymore.

== State visits ==
Moldovan Minister of Foreign Affairs visited Denmark in June 1996, and Moldovan Foreign Minister paid a visit to Denmark in December 1997. Danish politician Ruben Madsen visited Transnistria in November 2010.

== Trade ==
In 2008, Danish export to Moldova amounted 80 million DKK, and imports were under 1 million DKK.

== Political, technical and humanitarian assistance ==
The Ministry of Foreign Affairs of Denmark provides support for a Programme Against Human Trafficking in Moldova that also operates in Ukraine and Belarus. In Moldova, the program is implemented by the International Organization for Migration and the La Strada International Association.

The Danish government provided financial contributions to the Organization for Security and Co-operation in Europe fund which monitoring the withdrawal of Russian weapons and ammunition from Moldova's Dniester region.

The technical assistance offered by Denmark to the Republic of Moldova includes especially projects in the sphere of environment (district of Edinet, Cahul, Tighina). Denmark together with Sweden and the UN also provided financial assistance to the Moldovan parliament after the April 2009 post-election pogrom.

== Agreements ==
In 2004, The Moldovan parliament voted for the ratification of a Moldovan-Danish memorandum on implementation of the Kyoto Protocol under which Denmark committed itself to financing a series of projects aimed at reducing greenhouse gas emissions in Moldova.

== See also ==
- Foreign relations of Denmark
- Foreign relations of Moldova
- Moldova-NATO relations
- Moldova-EU relations
  - Accession of Moldova to the EU
