= Germany–Moldova relations =

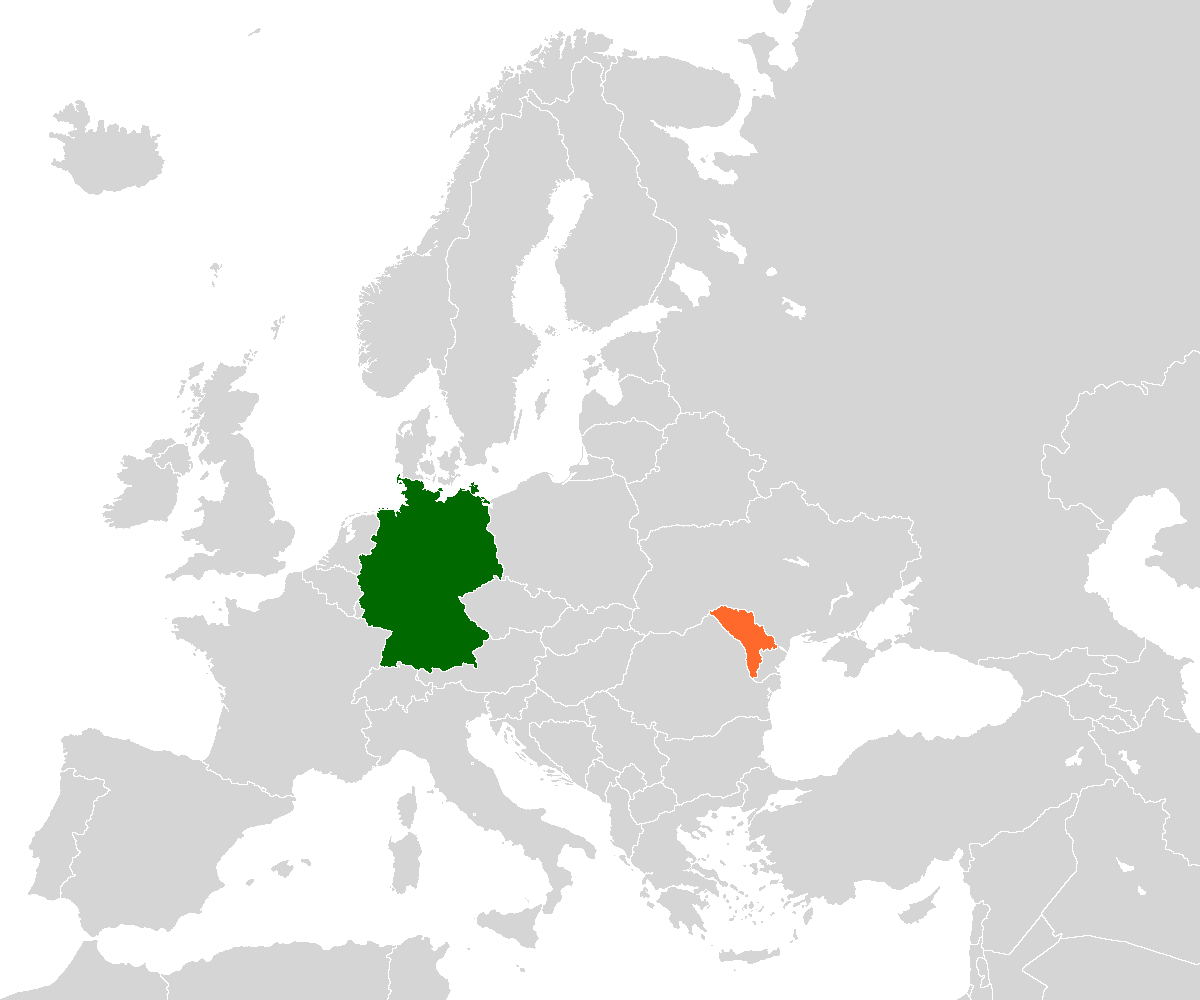

- Germany: Moldova

Germany–Moldova relations are the bilateral relations between Germany and Moldova. Germany has an embassy in Chişinău. Moldova has an embassy in Berlin. Germany was one of the first countries to recognise the independence on Moldova and to set up a diplomatic mission. Both countries are full members of the Council of Europe. Germany is a member of the European Union, which Moldova applied for in 2022.

== History ==
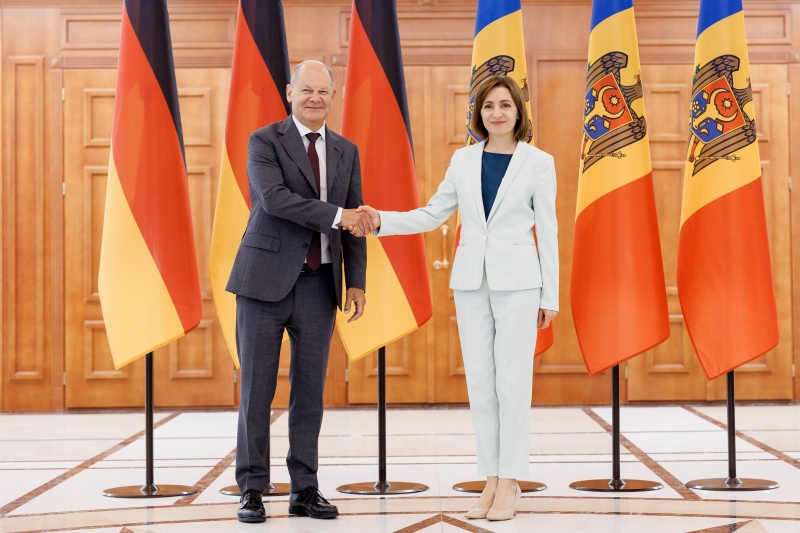
German Chancellor Olaf Scholz with Moldovan President Maia Sandu in Chișinău, 21 August 2024

Germany recognised independence of Moldova on 14 December 1991. Diplomatic relations between Moldova and Germany were established on 30 April 1992. Germany opened its embassy in Chişinău on 2 November 1992 and Moldova opened its own embassy in Bonn on 28 March 1995.

In May 2006, Moldovan president Vladimir Voronin visited Germany and met Angela Merkel. Merkel expressed Germany's interest in the Transnistrian problem's peaceful and quicker settlement with assistance from the European Union. Merkel also said the economic dimension of the bilateral Moldovan-German cooperation had "huge potential". In October 2006, the President of Bundestag Norbert Lammert visited the Republic of Moldova.

On 26 June 2008, the German Parliament passed a motion supported by the majority of MPs that Germany reconfirmed its support for Moldova's European Union bid.

== Resident diplomatic missions ==
- Germany has an embassy in Chișinău.
- Moldova has an embassy in Berlin and a consulate-general in Frankfurt.

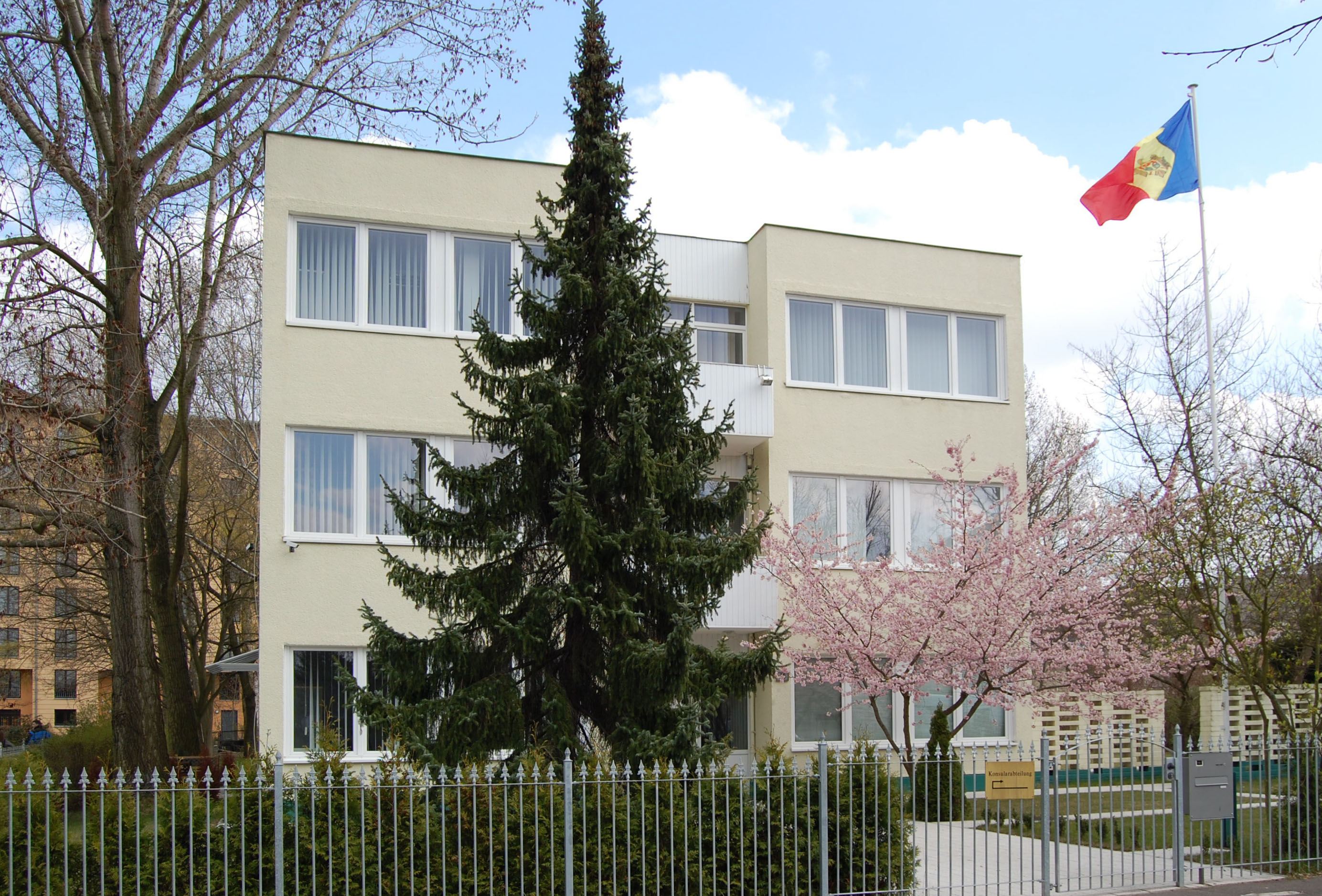
Embassy of Moldova in Berlin

== See also ==
- Foreign relations of Germany
- Foreign relations of Moldova
- Moldova-NATO relations
- Moldova-EU relations
  - Accession of Moldova to the EU
- Germans in Moldova
