= Italy–Moldova relations =

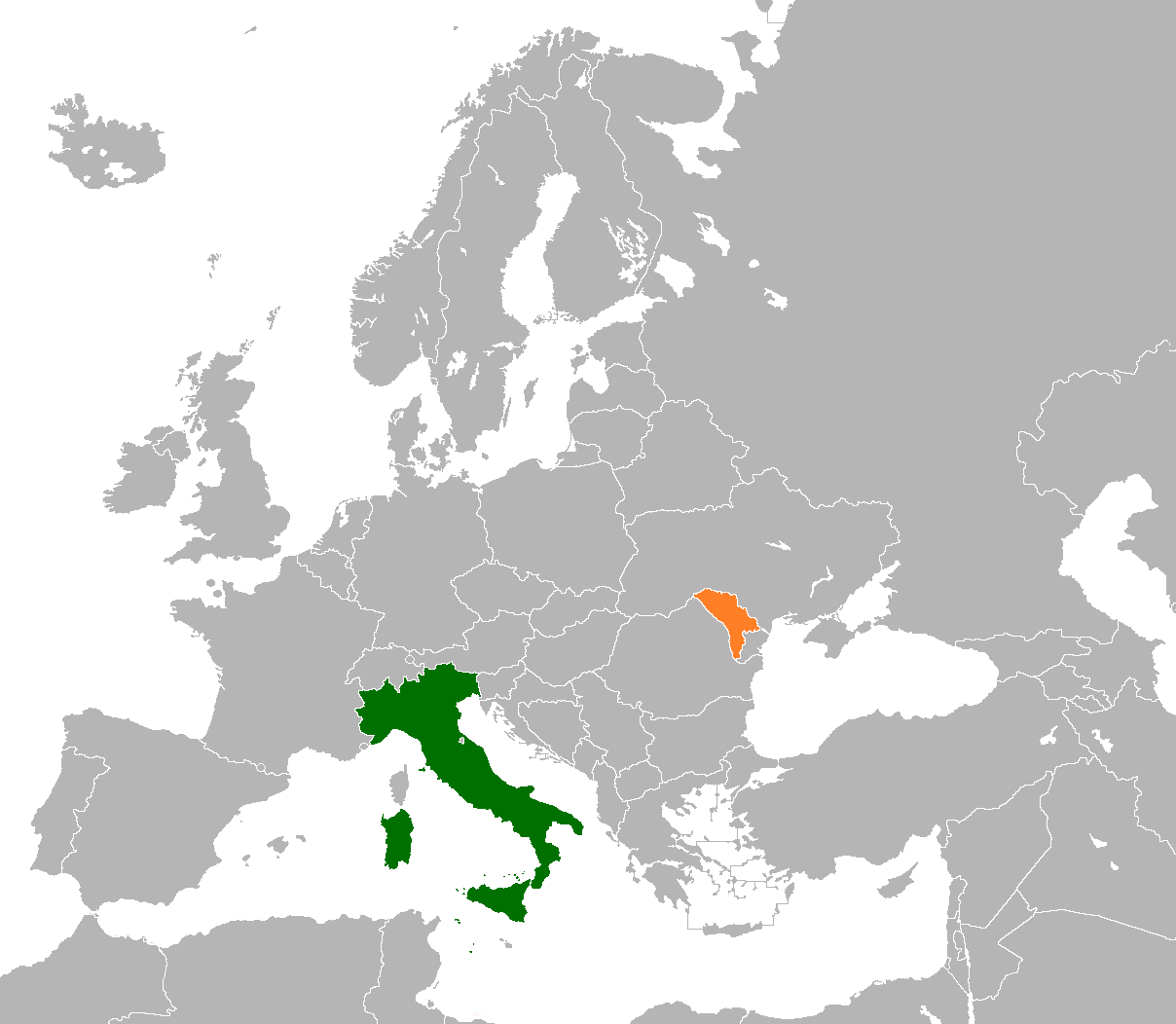

- Italy: Moldova

Italy–Moldova relations are the foreign relations between Moldova and Italy. Italy has an embassy in Chişinău. Both nations are members of the COE. Italy is a member of the EU, which Moldova applied for in 2022.

== History ==
In 1992 Italy was one of the first countries to recognize Moldova.

In 2014, Italy's foreign minister praised Moldova for choosing "the path of going toward the West but of also maintaining good relations with the East".

On 5 December 2024, Italy and Moldova signed a Defence Cooperation Agreement.

== Resident diplomatic missions ==
- Italy has an embassy in Chişinău.
- Moldova has an embassy in Rome a consulate-general in Milan, and a consulate in Padua.

== See also ==
- Foreign relations of Italy
- Foreign relations of Moldova
- Moldova-NATO relations
- Moldova-EU relations
  - Accession of Moldova to the EU
