= Czech Republic–Moldova relations =

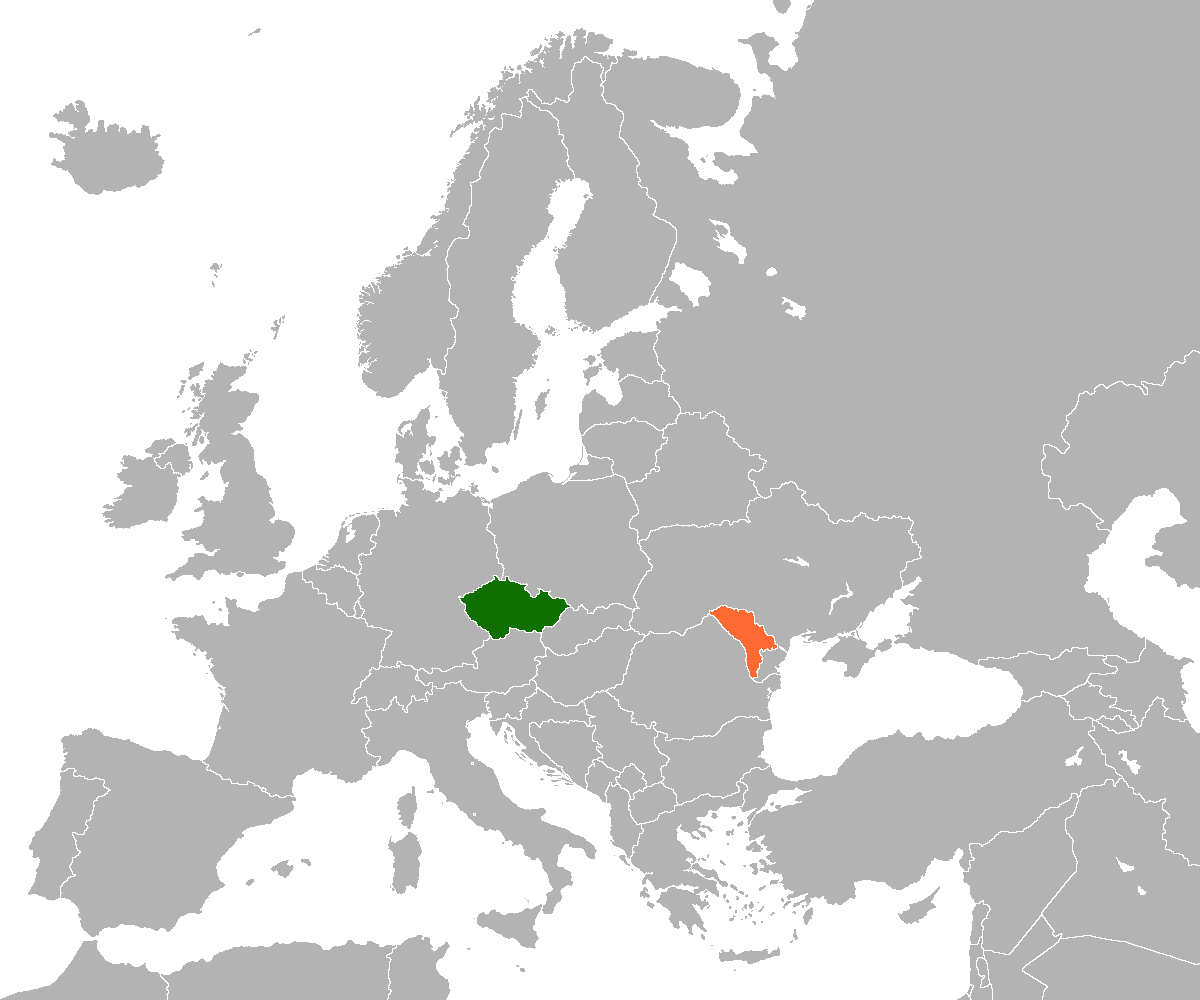

- Czech Republic: Moldova

Czech Republic–Moldova relations refer to foreign relations between the Czech Republic and Moldova. Moldova has an embassy in Prague. The Czech Republic has an embassy in Chişinău.

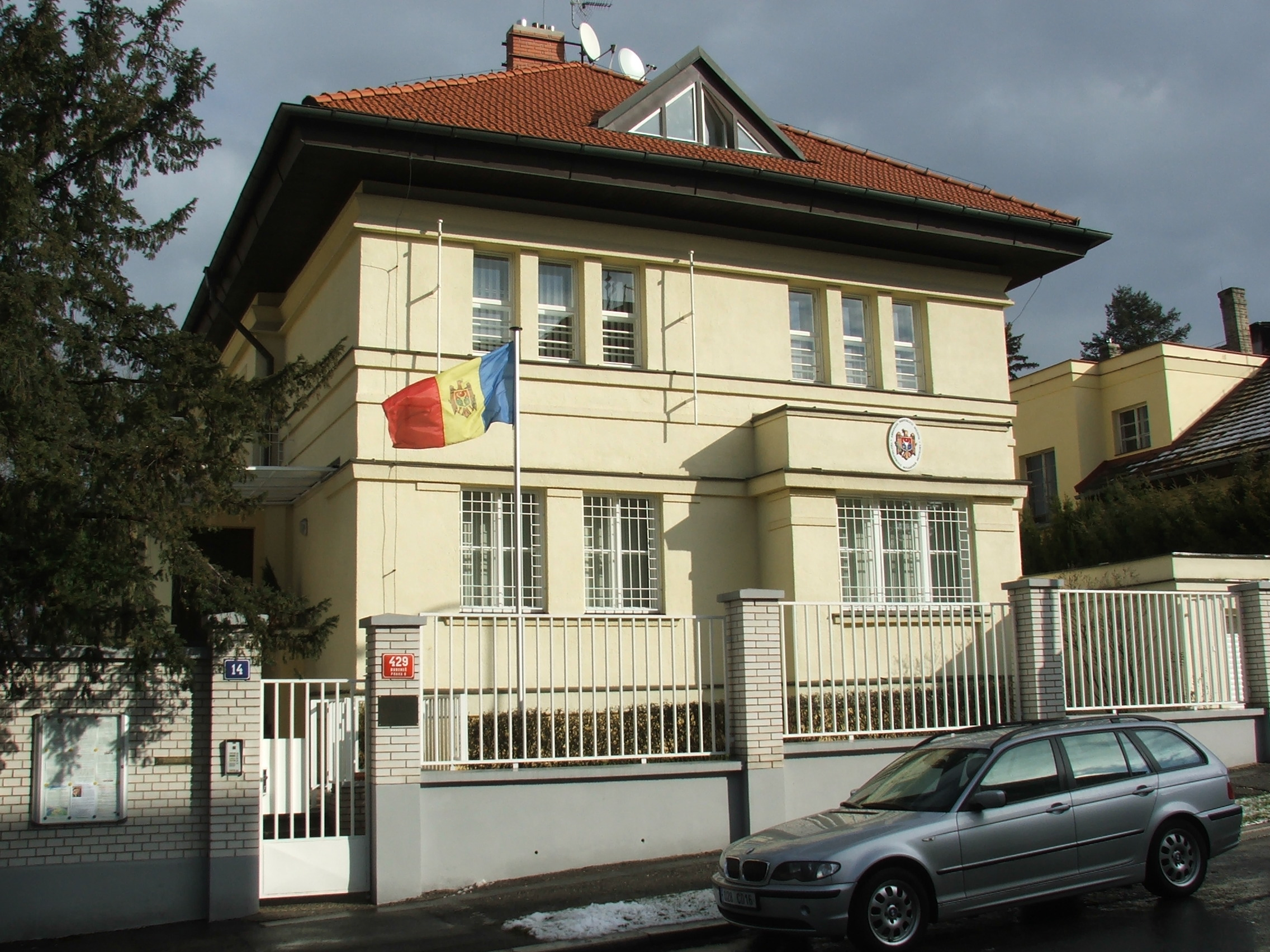
Embassy of Moldova in Prague, at Juárezova 14 160 00 Prague 6 - Bubeneč

The new building of the embassy of Moldova in Prague was opened on 2 September 1998 by the Moldovan Prime Minister, Zinaida Greceanîi, and Czech Prime Minister, Mirek Topolanek.

Ștefan Gorda was appointed as the Moldovan Ambassador to the Czech Republic in 2010. In 2016 Vitalie Rusu was appointed as the Ambassador to the Czech Republic. Czech Republic is a member of the EU, which Moldova applied for in 2022. Both countries are full members of the Council of Europe.

== See also ==
- Foreign relations of the Czech Republic
- Foreign relations of Moldova
- Moldova-NATO relations
- Moldova-EU relations
  - Accession of Moldova to the EU
