= Moldova–NATO relations =

- NATO: Moldova

NATO members and partners in Europe NATO members Accession protocol signed countries Membership Action Plan countries Intensified Dialogue countries Individual Partnership Action Plan countries Partnership for Peace members Aspiring Partnership for Peace members

NATO member countries Accession protocol signed Countries in the process of accession Countries promised invitations / Membership is not the goal Countries have not announced their membership intentions

Official relations between Moldova and NATO began in 1992 when Moldova joined the North Atlantic Cooperation Council. However, as Moldova's neutrality is enshrined in its constitution, there are no official plans for Moldova to join the organization.

== Neutrality ==
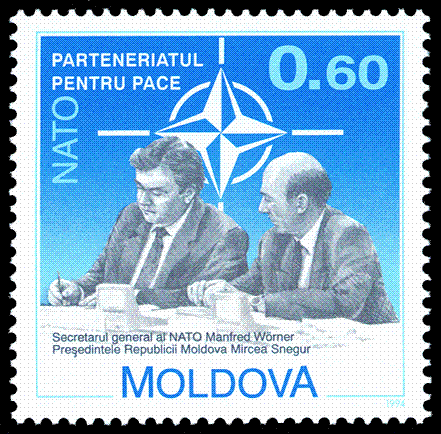
Snegur and Wörner signing Partnership for Peace on March 16, 1994

Moldova is a neutral country. Article 11 of the Constitution of Moldova states: "The Republic of Moldova proclaims its permanent neutrality. The Republic of Moldova does not allow the deployment of armed forces of other states on its territory."

== History ==
In 1992, Moldova joined the North Atlantic Cooperation Council, renamed the Euro-Atlantic Partnership Council (EAPC) in 1997. Relations expanded when Moldova joined the Partnership for Peace programme (PfP) in 1994. The Partnership for Peace was signed by Mircea Snegur and Manfred Wörner, on 16 March 1994, with Moldova becoming the 12th signatory country and the second of the Commonwealth of Independent States after Ukraine.

On July 8, 1997, Petru Lucinschi and Mihai Popov, the foreign minister of Moldova attended the NATO summit in Madrid.

The Mission of Moldova to NATO was established in 1997 with the appointment of the first Moldovan representative to the EAPC. The mission is located in the Embassy of Moldova in Brussels and has a liaison office in the premises of NATO headquarters in Brussels.

Vladimir Voronin visited NATO headquarters in Brussels on 23 June 2003, 7 June 2005, 22 June 2006, 18 June 2007, and 5 December 2007.

At the 2004 Istanbul summit, NATO accepted Russia's military presence in Moldova and Georgia (the withdrawal of these troops was an obligation Russia had assumed at the Organization for Security and Co-operation in Europe's 1999 Istanbul summit). US Defense Secretary Donald Rumsfeld stopped, en route to Istanbul, in Moldova, where he called for the withdrawal of Russian forces from the country.

On 23 September 2004, the NATO Secretary General, Jaap de Hoop Scheffer, traveled to Chişinău where he met with President of Moldova Vladimir Voronin, with Foreign Minister of Moldova Andrei Stratan and Minister of Defence Victor Gaiciuc.

The Individual Partnership Action Plan between NATO and Moldova was signed on 19 May 2006.

With the support of NATO's Public Diplomacy Division, an Information and Documentation Centre on NATO was inaugurated at the Moldova State University in October 2007.

On 3 April, at the 2008 Bucharest summit, NATO announced its support for the territorial integrity, independence and sovereignty of Moldova. Voronin participated to the Working Lunch of the Heads of State and Government of countries Euro-Atlantic Partnership Council in Bucharest.

On 18 November 2008, NATO Parliamentary Assembly adopted Resolution 371 on the future of NATO–Russia relations, with among other things, "urges the government and the parliament of Russia to respect its commitments which were taken at the Istanbul OSCE Summit in 1999 and has to withdraw its illegal military presence from the Transdnestrian region of Moldova in the nearest future."

In 2009, Moldova cancelled its attendance of the Cooperative 09 in response to a troop mutiny in Georgia.

The former communist government, which lost its majority in parliament in 2009 elections, was seen as more allied with Russia and was already a member of the Commonwealth of Independent States. In April 2009, Moldova announced it would not participate in the June NATO military exercises. The new ruling party, the Alliance for European Integration, declined to take any action to either move towards membership, or withdraw from the Commonwealth of Independent States, and denied plans to do either.

== Membership debate ==
Some Moldovan politicians, such as former Minister of Defence Vitalie Marinuța, have suggested joining NATO as part of a larger European integration. Prime Minister of Moldova, Dorin Recean, supported European Union membership, but not NATO membership, as did his predecessor Natalia Gavrilița, and her Party of Action and Solidarity. The second largest alliance in the parliament of Moldova, the Electoral Bloc of Communists and Socialists, strongly opposes NATO membership.

Following the 2014 annexation of Crimea by Russia, NATO officials warned that Russia might seek to annex Transnistria, a breakaway Moldovan region. This separatist issue could preclude Moldova from joining NATO, due to an unwillingness of alliance members to commit to defending a state which does not control its whole territory.

In 2014 a bill was introduced to the US Congress to grant Major non-NATO ally status to Georgia, Moldova, and Ukraine.

Moldovan President Maia Sandu stated in January 2023 that there was "serious discussion" about joining "a larger alliance" following the Russian invasion of Ukraine, though she did not specifically name NATO.

Some Moldovan politicians, including former Prime Minister Iurie Leancă, have also supported the idea of unifying with neighboring NATO member Romania, which Moldova shares a language and much of its history with. A poll in April 2021 found that 43.9% of those surveyed supported that idea.

On 2 February 2023, Russian foreign minister Sergey Lavrov declared that Moldova might have Ukraine's fate (meaning to be attacked by Russia) if the Moldovan president Maia Sandu wants Moldova to unite with Romania and join NATO.

== Opinion polling on NATO membership ==
A poll in June 2018 found that 22% of Moldovans would vote in favour of joining NATO, while 43% would oppose.

Another poll in December 2018 found that, if given the choice in a referendum, 22% of Moldovans would vote in favor of joining NATO, while 32% would vote against it and 21% would be unsure.

In May 2022, shortly after Russia's invasion of neighbouring Ukraine had begun, a poll in Moldova found that 24.5% supported NATO membership.

In February 2023, 24% would vote in favor of NATO membership while 62% would vote against, according to an IMAS poll.

In August 2024, 29.5% favored NATO membership, a decrease from 34% in April of that year.

Opinion polls on Moldovan membership of NATO
Dates conducted	Pollster	Sample size	Support	Oppose	Neutral or DK	Lead	Ref.
7 March 2024	Sweden accedes to NATO						
4 April 2023	Finland accedes to NATO						
24 February 2022	Russia invades Ukraine						
16 March 2014	Russia annexes Crimea						
7 August 2008	Russia invades Georgia						

== Moldova's foreign relations with NATO member states ==
- Albania
- Belgium
- Bulgaria
- Canada
- Croatia
- Czech Republic
- Denmark
- Estonia
- Finland
- France
- Germany
- Greece
- Hungary
- Iceland
- Italy
- Latvia
- Lithuania
- Luxembourg
- Montenegro
- Netherlands
- North Macedonia
- Norway
- Poland
- Portugal
- Romania
- Slovakia
- Slovenia
- Spain
- Sweden
- Turkey
- United Kingdom
- United States

== See also ==
- Foreign relations of Moldova
- Foreign relations of NATO
- Enlargement of NATO
- Armenia–NATO relations
- Azerbaijan–NATO relations
- Belarus–NATO relations
- Georgia–NATO relations
- Moldova–EU relations
- Accession of Moldova to the EU
- Moldova–Russia relations
- Moldova–United States relations
- Military of Moldova
- NATO open door policy
- Partnership for Peace
- Russia–NATO relations
- Serbia–NATO relations
- Ukraine–NATO relations
