= Moldova–Spain relations =

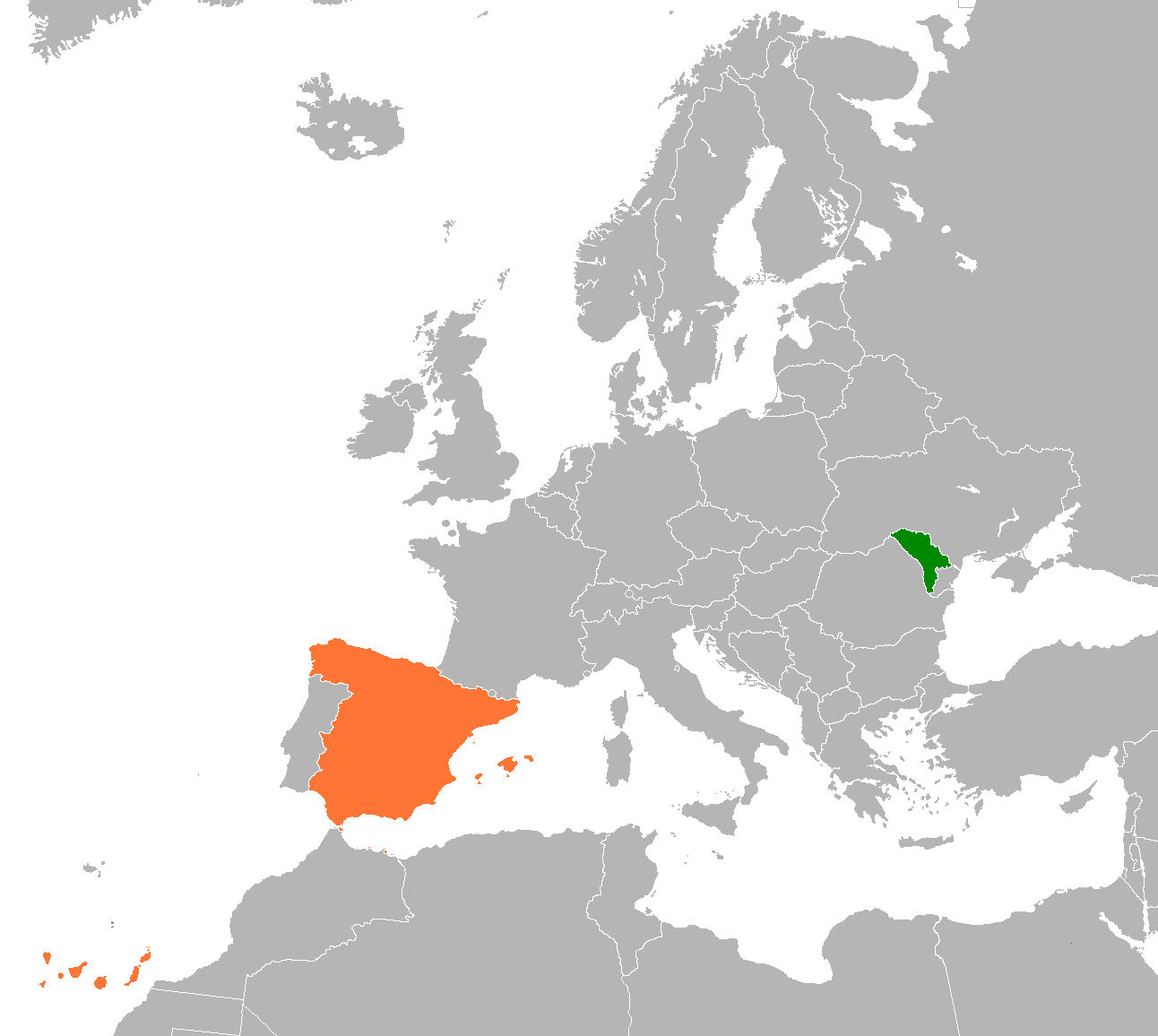

- Moldova: Spain

Moldovan–Spanish relations are foreign relations between Spain and Moldova. On 30 January 1992, Spain established diplomatic relations with Moldova. Spain is represented in Moldova via its embassy in Bucharest in Romania.

In 2008, the Spanish government indicated that 12,582 Moldovan citizens were legally working there. Spain was a significant investor in Moldova through Unión Fenosa which owns three of Moldova's five energy distribution companies. Fenosa/Naturgy sold off her stock in the companies. Spain is a member of the European Union, which Moldova applied for in 2022.

== History ==
On January 30, 1992, Spain established diplomatic relations with Moldova. The spokesman of Foreign Affairs Department of the Popular Party, Javier Rupérez, headed the Spanish delegation of the Parliamentary Assembly of the Organization for Security and Co-operation in Europe on 23 February 1994 to Chişinău to observe the development of the first democratic elections in Moldova. The observers maintained contacts with the first President of Moldova Snegur and other authorities of the country. In the same date the then Spanish president, Felipe González, sent a letter to the Moldovan Government explaining the benefits that the entrance in the "Association for Peace" of NATO would suppose for Moldova. González promised in its message that Spain followed with interest the development of the events in Moldova and was prepared to propose initiatives that contributed to the security and the stability in the zone.

On 8 July 1997 Petru Lucinschi, and Mihai Popov, the Minister of Foreign Affairs attended a NATO summit in Madrid. In 1998, Spain was not represented in Chişinău, but used its embassy in Bucharest.

In September 2000, Petru Lucinschi met in New York with José María Aznar, President of the Spanish Government at the Millennium Summit. On 6 November 2000 the Secretary of State for European Affairs, Ramon de Miguel, traveled to Moldova to carry out a visit of work of two days during which he analyzed the bilateral relations with the president of the Republic, Petru Lucinschi, and with prime minister, Dumitru Braghis. Miguel also met with the Deputy Prime-Minister for Defense Affairs, Valeriu Cosarciuc, the Minister of Exteriors, Nicolae Tabacuru and the Vice-Minister, Iurie Leanca, as well as with the President of the Commission for Transnistria Vasile Sturza, a group of Spanish industrialists and several members of the Moldovan Parliament. During his stay in Moldova, Miguel inaugurated the Center of Hispanic Studies at the State University of Moldova. The trip was consequence of the meeting that in September had maintained in New York Lucinschi with the president of the Spanish Government, José Maria Aznar. Also in 2000 Spanish military experts visited to Moldova to report on the War of Transnistria. Their trip was cut short and they returned home after 2 days after local authorities suspended their visit.

In October 2005, the new ambassador of Spain in Bucharest, Juan Pablo Garci'a-Berdoy, visited Chişinău to offer credentials and he met with the Vice-Minister of Foreign Affairs, Eugenia Kistruga. The Vice-Minister communicated to the ambassador the possibility of opening the Embassy of Moldova in Madrid in 2006 or 2007. He asked for the opening of the Embassy of Spain in Chişinău. The first visit to Spain by a Moldovan foreign minister took place on 5 October 2006.

There was a visit to Madrid on 6 October 2006 by the Deputy Prime Minister and Minister of Foreign Affairs of Moldova, Andrei Stratan. He emphasized the new bilateral relations between Spain and Moldova.

In March 2007 Moldova hoped that with Spain in the Presidency of the Organization for Security and Co-operation in Europe they would have mediation in the Transnistria conflict. In May 2007 a meeting on the conflict took place in Madrid. Representing Spain was D. José María Pons and Miguel Ángel Moratinos of the Ministry of Foreign Affairs. In October 2007 The Spanish minister made his first-ever visit to Chişinău. A formal announcement was made of Chişinău's intention to open Moldova's embassy in Madrid.

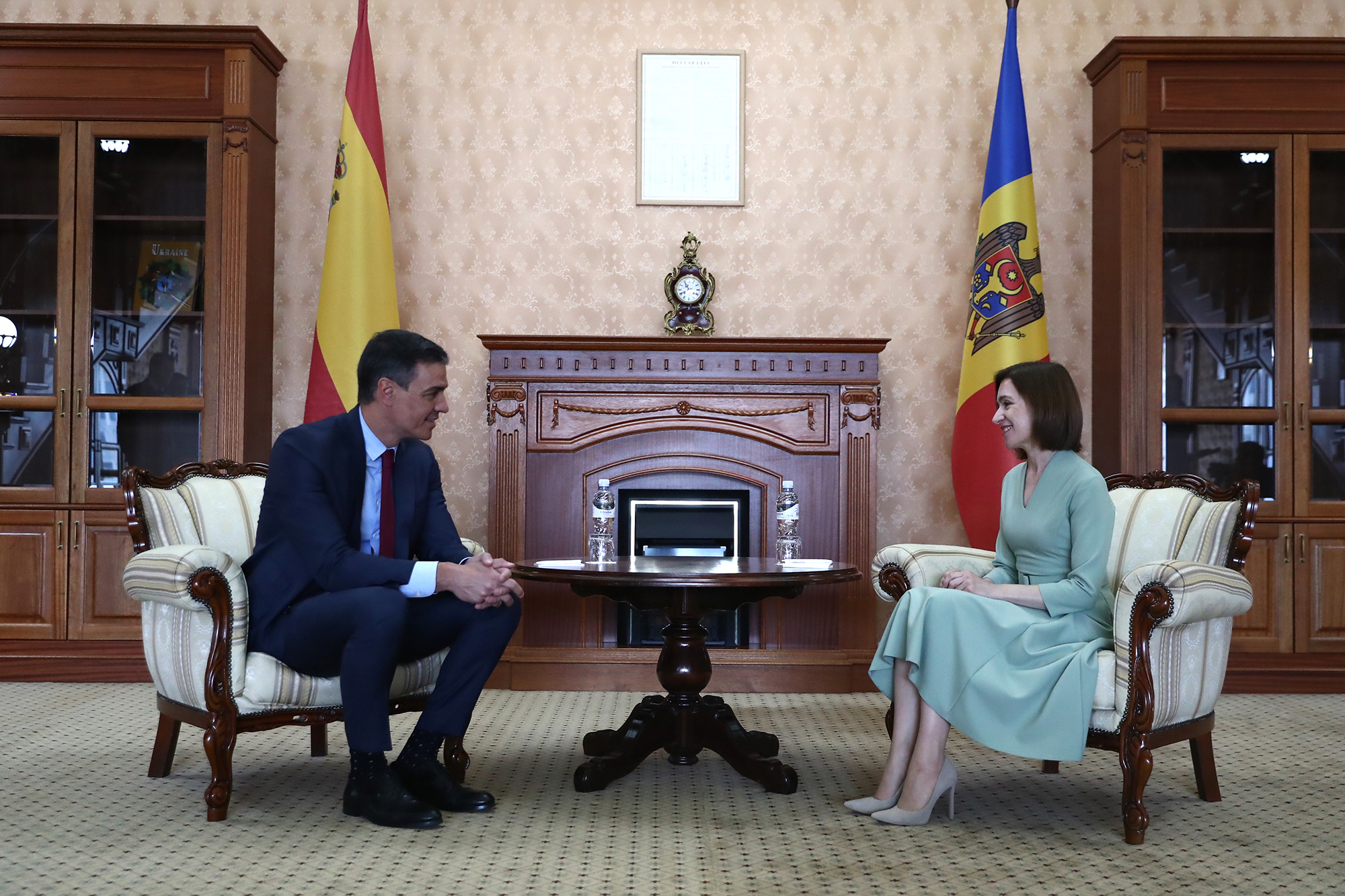
Spanish Prime Minister Pedro Sánchez with Moldovan President Maia Sandu in 2022

In June 2022, on the occasion of the 30th anniversary of the establishment of diplomatic relations between the two countries, Spanish prime minister Pedro Sánchez made the first visit ever of a Spanish head of government to Moldova, meeting with Moldovan president Maia Sandu and prime minister Natalia Gavrilita. Sánchez announced the plan to open a diplomatic office in Chişinău, and told Sandu Spain's position defending "the sovereignty and territorial integrity" of Moldova "within its internationally recognized borders". Minister Plenipotentiary Juan Antonio Martin Burgos was appointed and acredited as Chargé d'Affaires a.i., Head of the Diplomatic Office of the Kingdom of Spain in Chisinau in June 2022.

== Economic relations ==
Spain is a significant investor in Moldova with the presence of the energy company Union Fenosa which owns three of Moldova's five energy distribution companies. Spain is the third foreign investor in Moldova since the year 2000. Spain's commerce between Moldova is listed below in millions of €:

Commercial balance	2003	2004	2005	2006
Import	20,93	17,84	3,56	6,51
Export	7,68	9,47	11,33	11,18
Balance	-13,25	-8,37	7,77	4,67
Rate cover	36,60	53,00	318,20	171,70
% Import variation	-40,69	-14,76	-80,04	82,87
% Export variation	14,80	23,31	19,64	-1,32

== Agreements ==
- 1999 May 20: Agreement between the Government of the Kingdom of Spain and the Government of the Republic of Moldova on Highway International Transport
- 2006 May 11: Agreement for Promotion and Reciprocal Protection of Investments

== Resident diplomatic missions ==
- Moldova has an embassy in Madrid.
- Spain is accredited to Moldova from its embassy in Bucharest, Romania.
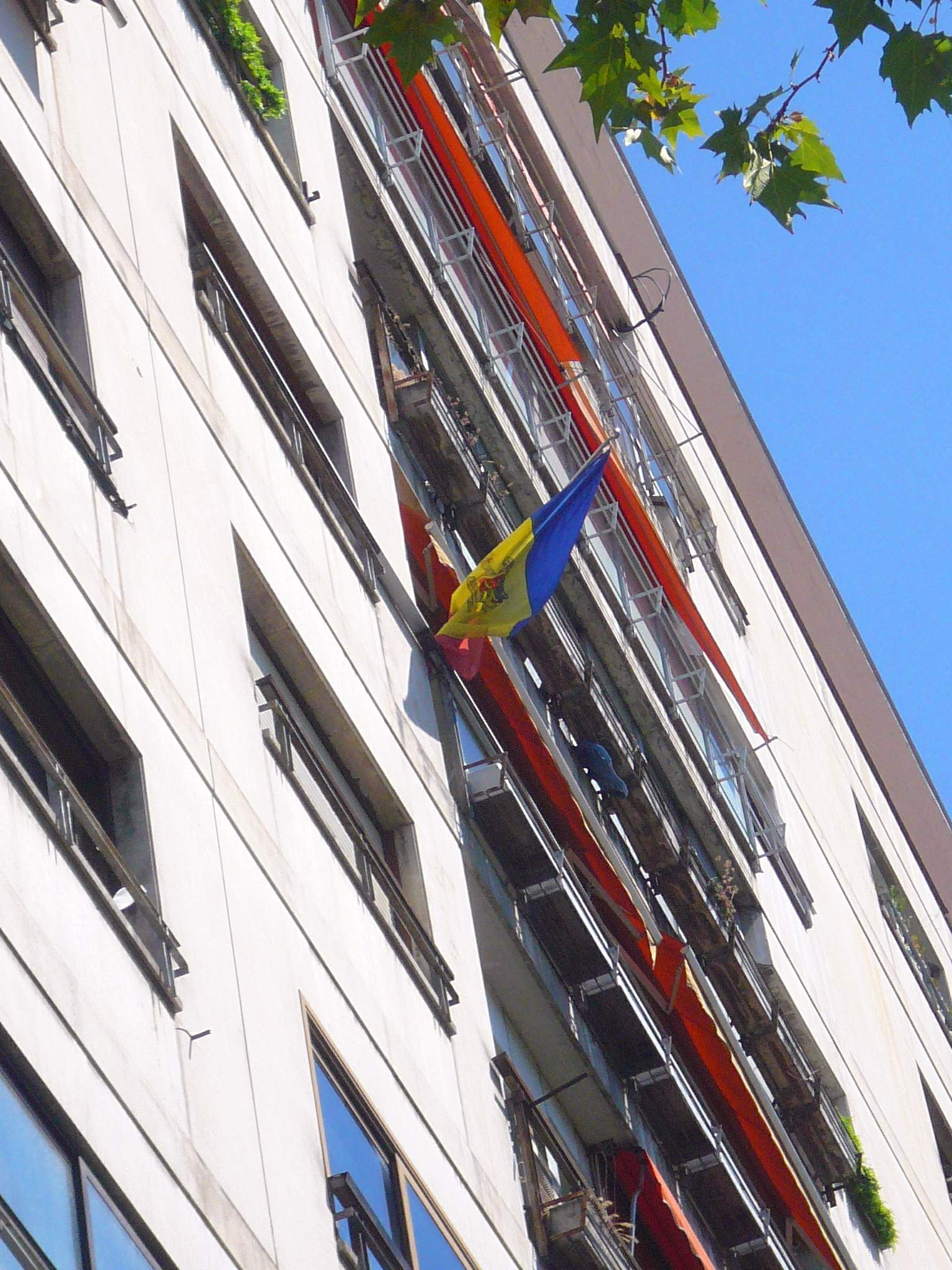
Embassy of Moldova in Madrid

== See also ==
- Foreign relations of Moldova
- Foreign relations of Spain
- Moldova-NATO relations
- Moldova-EU relations
  - Accession of Moldova to the EU
