= Greece–Moldova relations =

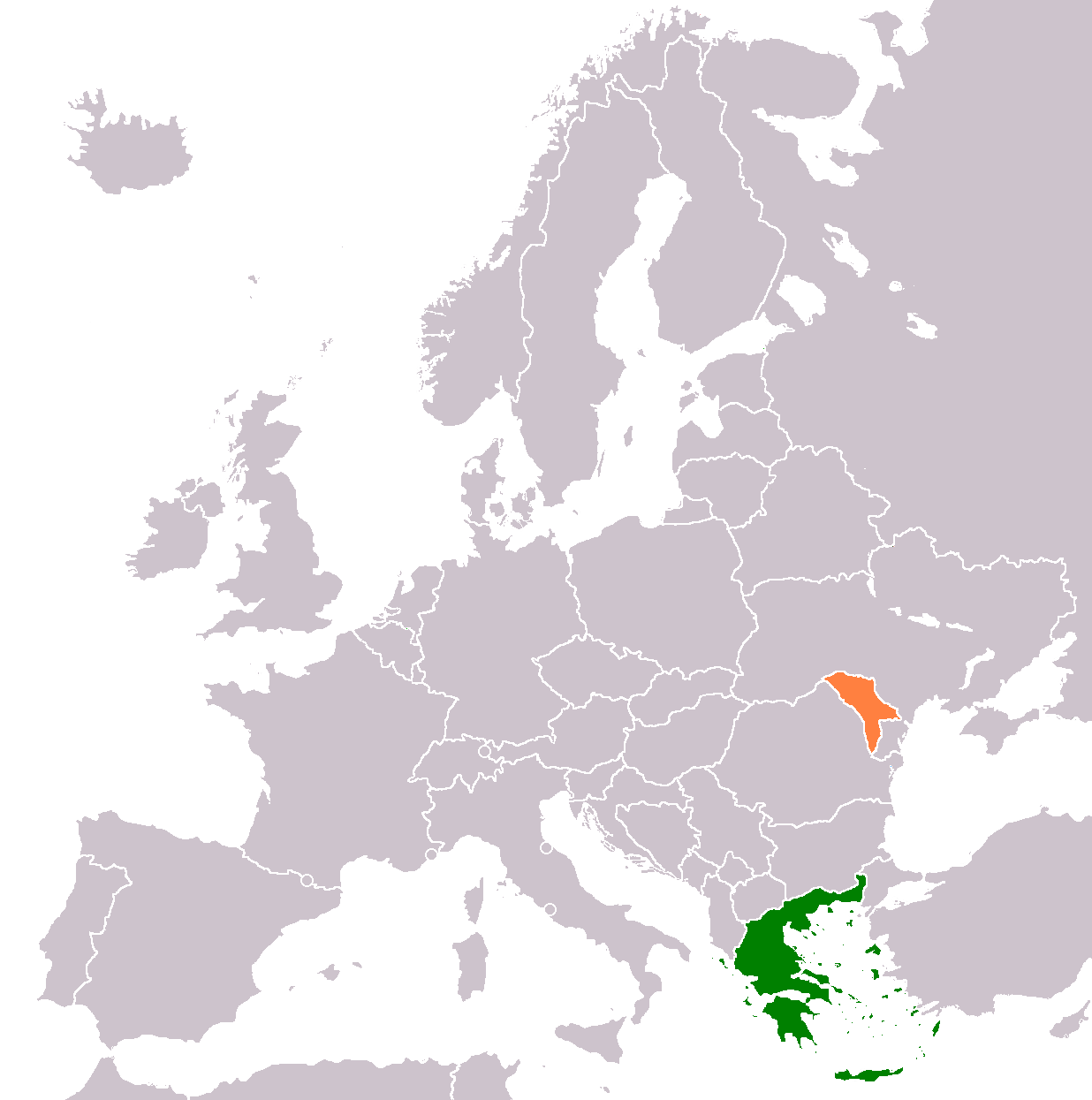

- Greece: Moldova

Greece–Moldova relations are the bilateral relations between Greece and Moldova. Greece is a member of the European Union, which Moldova applied for in 2022. Both countries are full members of the Council of Europe.

== History ==
Greece and Moldova have established ties from the mid-20th century due to the large number of Greek residents in Moldova after they were expelled from Greece due to their communist tendencies.

== Educational collaboration ==
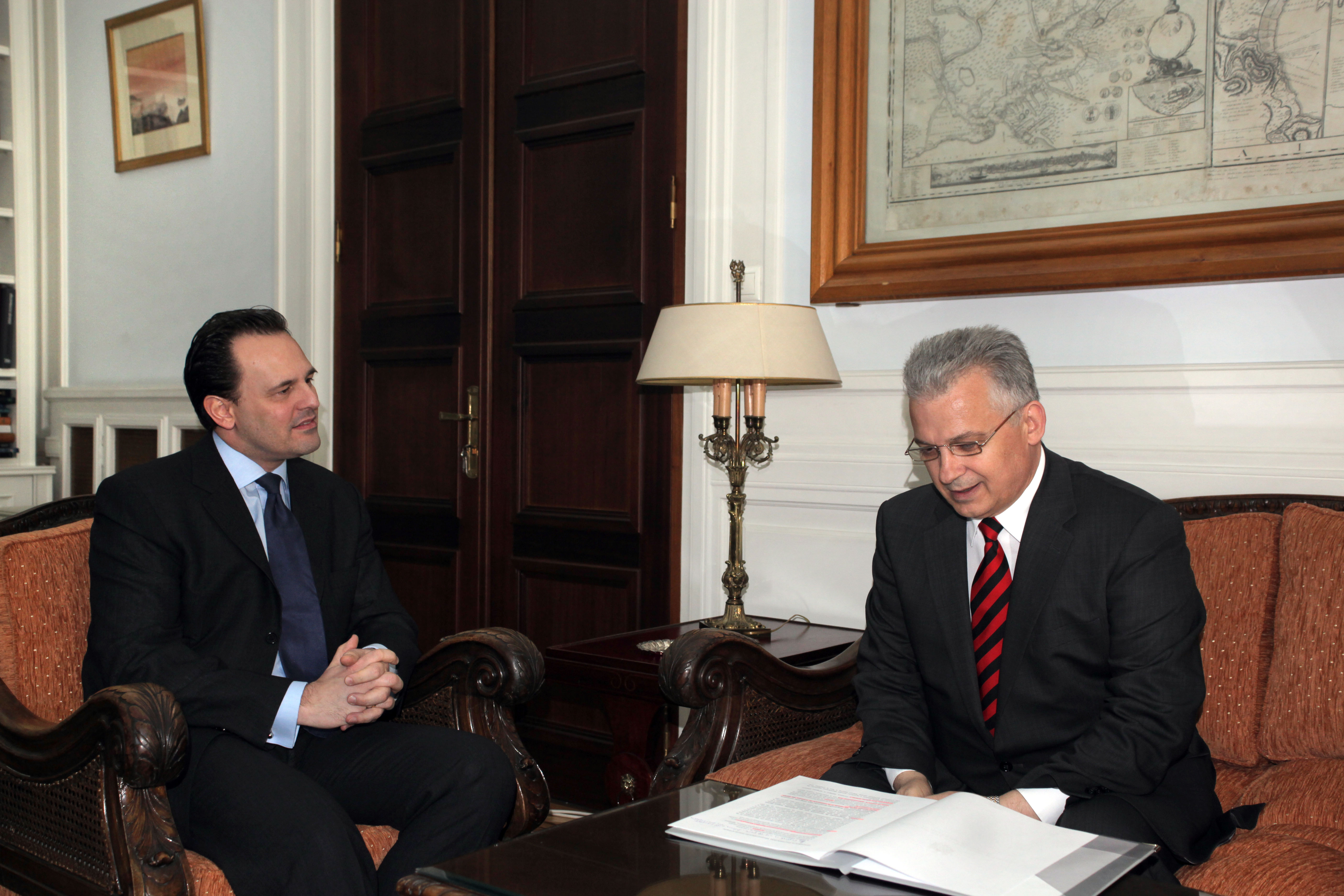
Foreign Minister of Greece Dimitris Droutsas receiving the Moldovan Ambassador to Athens Michai Balan in a protocol meeting in 2011 in Athens

There has been a soaring interest since 1992 in Moldova on the Greek language. Greek-language teaching is offered by three largest Moldovan higher education institutes. The department of Greek language and culture has been created as part of the Moldova State University since 1998. Teaching of the Greek language is considered as of paramount importance for the Greek community of Moldova. Greek Ministry of Education has been sending study materials for the students following Greek language courses but also scholarships for Aristotle University of Thessaloniki.

== Resident diplomatic missions ==
- Greece has an embassy in Chișinău
- Moldova has an embassy in Athens.

== See also ==
- Foreign relations of Greece
- Foreign relations of Moldova
- Moldova-NATO relations
- Moldova-EU relations
  - Accession of Moldova to the EU
- Greeks in Moldova
