= Moldova–Slovenia relations =

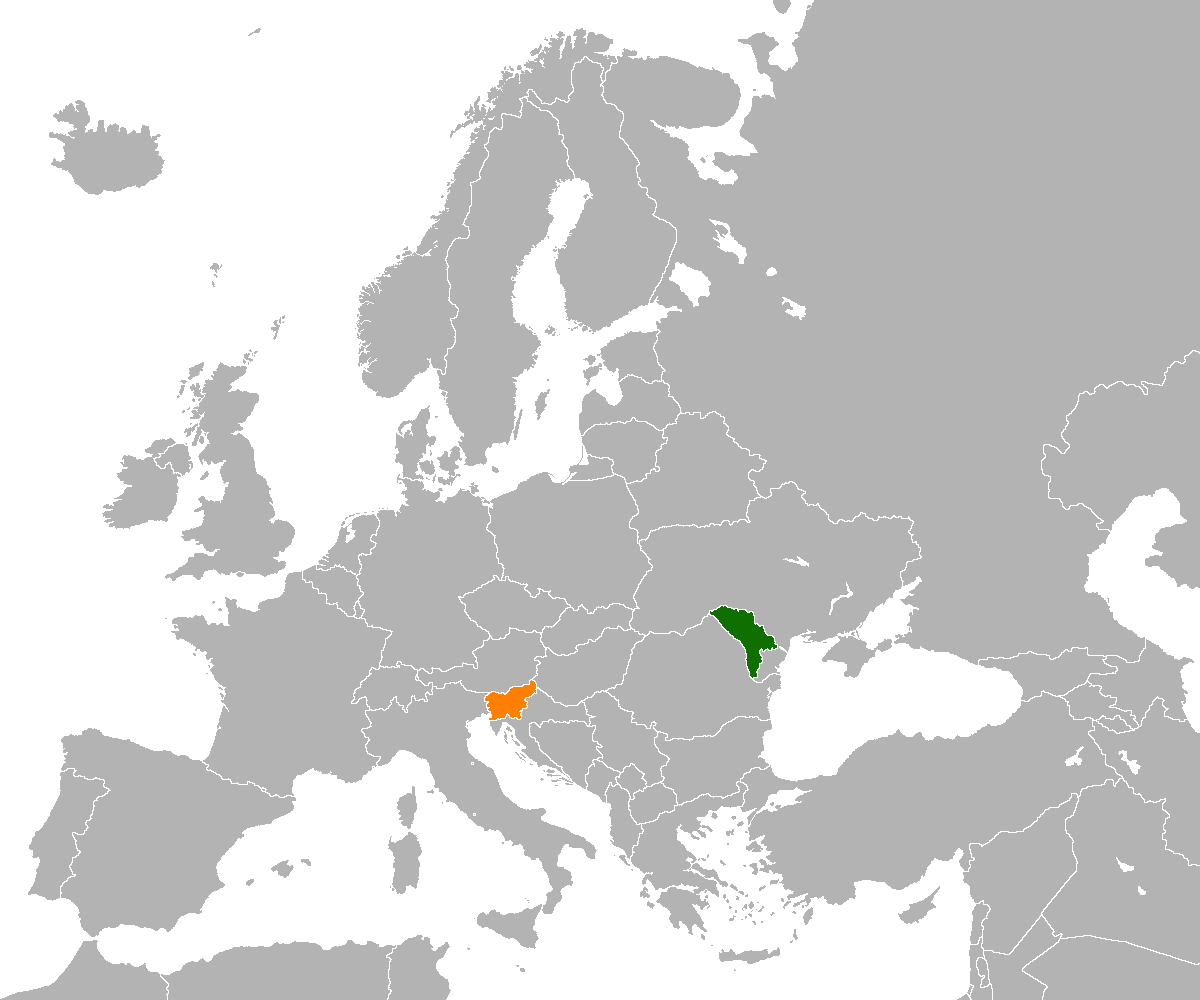

- Moldova: Slovenia

Moldova–Slovenia relations are the bilateral relations between Moldova and Slovenia. Moldova recognized the Republic of Slovenia under an unknown date. Diplomatic relations were established on October 27, 1993. Both countries are represented in each other through their embassies in Budapest (Hungary). Slovenia is a member of the European Union, which Moldova applied for in 2022. Both countries are full members of the Council of Europe.

== State visits ==
In April 2003, Moldovan President Petru Lucinschi visited Slovenia.

In 2004, Slovene President Janez Drnovšek met Moldovan President Vladimir Voronin and supported Voronin's initiative to sign a stability and security pact for Moldova.

In April 2007, Moldovan Prime minister Vasile Tarlev visited Slovenian Prime Minister Janez Janša. They both called for stronger business ties between the two countries and signed a memorandum of understanding between the two economy ministries. Tarlev's visit was part of the fourth Moldovan-Slovene business forum in Ljubljana.

== Co-operation ==
Slovenia has offered specific assistance to Moldova regarding Moldova's desire to join the European Union. Slovenian Foreign Minister Dimitrij Rupel, met Moldovan President Voronin in Brussels in 2008 and said that Moldova would need to continue its reforms specifically pointed regarding fighting corruption, the importance of implementing the Telecommunications Act in a manner that ensures pluralism in the media and human rights.

== International organizations ==
While Slovenia became a member of the EU and NATO in 2004, Moldova is an EU candidate country but is not a member of NATO.

== Diplomatic missions ==
- Moldova is accredited to Slovenia from its embassy in Budapest, Hungary.
- Slovenia is accredited to Moldova from its embassy in Kyiv, Ukraine.

== See also ==
- Foreign relations of Moldova
- Foreign relations of Slovenia
- Moldova-NATO relations
- Moldova-EU relations
  - Accession of Moldova to the EU
