= Greeks in Moldova =

Ethnic group

Total population
- 3,000 or 4,000

Languages
- Greek, Russian and Romanian

Related ethnic groups
- Greek diaspora

The Greeks in Moldova comprise approximately 3,000 to 4,000 Moldovan citizens of Greek origin. Thirty Greek companies were active in Moldova in 2003, while total invested Greek capital amounted to $5.3 million (October 2003). In 2006, a team of researchers discovered that the oldest house in Chișinău had once been the headquarters of the Filiki Etaireia, the secret society that initiated the Greek War of Independence in 1821.

== History ==
The Greek presence in what is now Moldova dates back as far as the apoikiai (colonies) and emporia (trade stations) founded in and around Dobruja (see Colonies in antiquity and Pontic Greeks), beginning in the 7th century BC. Starting with the Milesian colony at Istros, the process reached its height after Tomis was founded in the 5th century BC. Although forever subject to the Dacian interference and easily disrupted by changes in the politics of neighbour tribal chieftains, the colonies prospered until being briefly submitted in various forms by King Burebista (late 1st century BC). Immediately after, and for the following centuries, they were stripped of their privileges by their new Roman masters, and followed the Empire into its crises.

== Notable people ==
- Vladimir Cosse, former Moldovan international footballer

== See also ==
- Greece–Moldova relations
- Greeks in Romania
- Greek diaspora
- Ethnic groups in Moldova
