= Moldova–European Union relations =

- European Union: Moldova

Diplomatic mission
- European Union Delegation, Chișinău: Mission of Moldova, Brussels

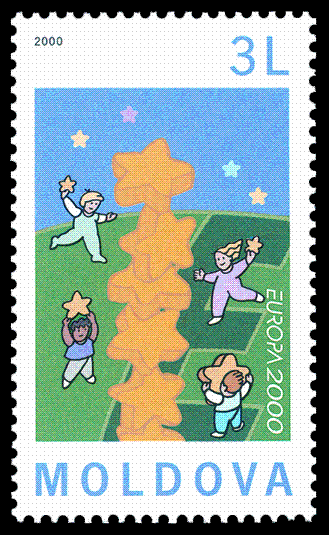
A 2000 stamp celebrating 50 years of the Schuman Declaration

The Republic of Moldova is a candidate state to the European Union since 2022. The relations between the bloc and the post-Soviet state are shaped by the European Neighbourhood Policy and are mostly positive since 2020, when the pro-European Maia Sandu became the president of Moldova, a position she holds until today.

After gaining independence from the Soviet Union in 1991, Moldova went through a crisis period all throughout the last decade of the 20th century, marked by political instability, Russian influence and lack of monetary resources. The first signs of European integration were seen during the presidency of the Communist Vladimir Voronin from 2001 to 2009, but it was mostly formal as no real signs were seen. Internal repression for pro-European measures and rights led to unrest and continued political instability culminating in events such as the April 2009 riots.

Moldova, together with Ukraine and Georgia, is part of the Association Trio, founded in 2021 to oversee the integration of all three with the European community. All the three sent their formal applications in March 2022, within days of each other due to the Russian invasion of Ukraine that started a week prior. On June 23, 2022, Moldova and Ukraine were given green light to start negotiations under the commitment of structural reforms.

The strongest ties with a member state of the European Union for Moldova are with Romania, its western neighbour. The two states share a long history, culture, traditions and Romanian is the official language of both of them. Moldova, excepting Transnistria, was part of Romania between 1918 and 1940, while the Principality of Moldavia was one of the three core Romanian states. Romanians represent a significant minority in Moldova, at about 8% of the total population declaring itself ethnic Romanian despite an active controversy between the separation of Moldovans and Romanians in two different ethnicities. A unification movement is active in both states, with medium support in both states. About a third of Moldova's population holds Romanian citizenship due to a law passed by the Government of Romania offering the right of anyone with a Romanian ancestor up to the third generation to claim Romanian citizenship. 40% of all the foreign-born residents of Romania are from Moldova.

Moldova is the second poorest country in Europe and has one of the lowest HDI out of every European country. Its economy is dominated by the service sector. Just like Ukraine and Georgia, Moldova has Russian-occupied territories, in this case the Pridnestrovian Moldavian Republic, or Transnistria for short. Russian influence is seen as a major factor holding Moldova back from its accession and the country used to be a full member of the Commonwealth of Independent States until 2022, when it began the withdrawal process which is expected to be done in 2027. Russophilia is a major part of the Moldovan politics, the country alternating between a pro-European government, led currently by Maia Sandu and her party PAS, and a pro-Russian opposition, led by the Communists, Socialists and other proxy parties representing Russian interests.

The European Union has developed a close relation with Moldova especially in the later years. It opened an office in Chișinău in 2005 and has constantly aided Moldova throughout crisis periods such as the COVID-19 pandemic. In 2024, a constitutional referendum oversaw the amendment of the constitution to include European integration as a key goal of Moldova. Moldova and Ukraine both officially began negotiations on July 25, 2024. As of September 2026, 7 chapters have been opened and none closed.

== Agreements ==
The Partnership and Cooperation Agreement (PCA) represents the legal framework for the Republic of Moldova–European Union relationship. The Agreement was signed on 28 November 1994 and entered into force on 1 July 1998 for the next 10 years. This arrangement provides for a basis of cooperation with the EU in the political, commercial, economic, legal, cultural and scientific areas.

In 2005, Moldova began implementing its first three-year action plan within the framework of the EU's European Neighbourhood Policy. This was the EU Moldova Action Plan, a political document that laid out the strategic objectives of cooperation between Moldova and the EU. Its implementation was intended to help fulfil the provisions in the PCA and to encourage and support Moldova's objective of further integration into European economic and social structures. Implementation of the Action Plan was meant to significantly advance the approximation of Moldovan legislation, norms and standards to those of the European Union.

Moldova and the EU began negotiating an Association Agreement (AA), including a Deep and Comprehensive Free Trade Area, to replace the PCA in January 2010. The AA was initialled in November 2013 at the Eastern Partnership summit, and signed on 27 June 2014. The parliament of Moldova ratified the agreement on 2 July 2014.

On 24 January 2011, Moldova officially received an "action plan" toward the establishment of a visa-free regime for short-stay travel from the EU's Internal Affairs Commissioner. In November 2013, the Commission proposed that visa requirements for short-term visits be abolished for Moldovan citizens holding biometric passports, with Lithuanian Foreign Minister Linas Linkevičius suggesting the change could take place in early 2014. On 13 February 2014 the European Parliament's Civil Liberties, Justice, and Home Affairs Committee approved lifting the visa requirements, and the full parliament voted in favour on 27 February 2014. The European Parliament and Council gave their final consent to visa-free travel for Moldovan citizens on 3 April 2014, and the change become applicable on 28 April 2014.

On 14 May 2024, Financial Times reported that Moldova and the European Union would soon sign an important security agreement. The article by Financial Times claims that the news agency has seen the proposed security arrangement and notes that the arrangement would significantly deepen the security relationship of Moldova and the European Union. Furthermore, the agreement would come on the heels of a defense agreement between Moldova and France from March 2024, as the Financial Times article about the agreement between Moldova and the European Union also notes. The report from the Financial Times also comes after recent news (April 2024) about a Romanian draft bill on defending Romanian citizens abroad (including many Moldovans with Romanian citizenship) from danger via "military intervention" and including from "hybrid threats", which is significant considering Romania's membership in the European Union (according to Balkan Insight). This proposed Romanian legislation does not specify policy towards dual-citizenship holders of Romanian passports.

On 20 May 2024, Moldova becomes the first non-European Union (EU) signatory country to sign a security and defense pact with the EU to receive assistance to strengthen and manage its borders, facilitate cooperation in terms of cybersecurity and fight against disinformation.

== Accession of Moldova to the European Union ==
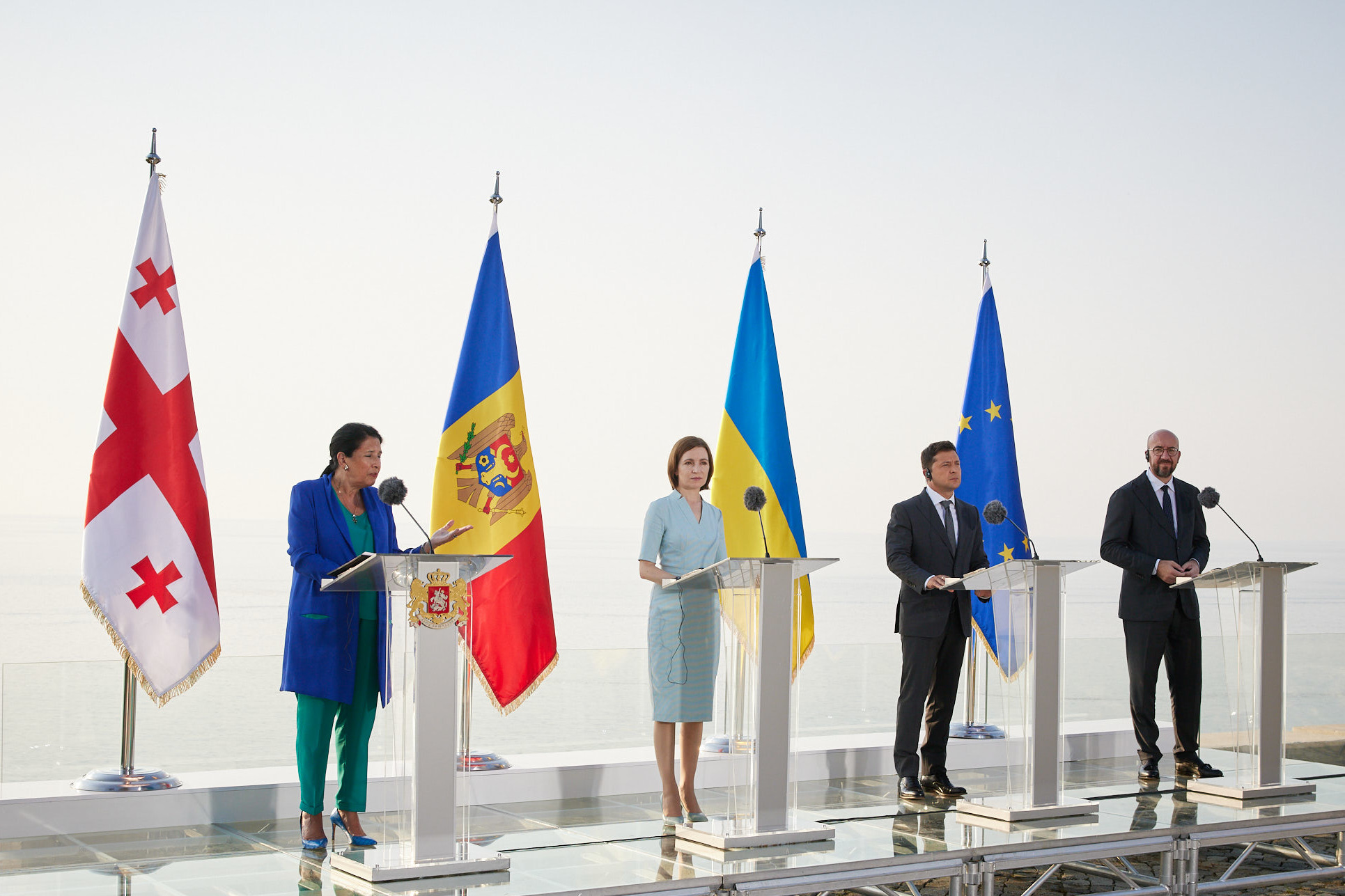
President of Georgia Salome Zourabichvili, President of Moldova Maia Sandu, President of Ukraine Volodymyr Zelenskyy and President of the European Council Charles Michel during the 2021 Batumi International Conference. In 2014, the EU signed Association Agreements with all the three states.

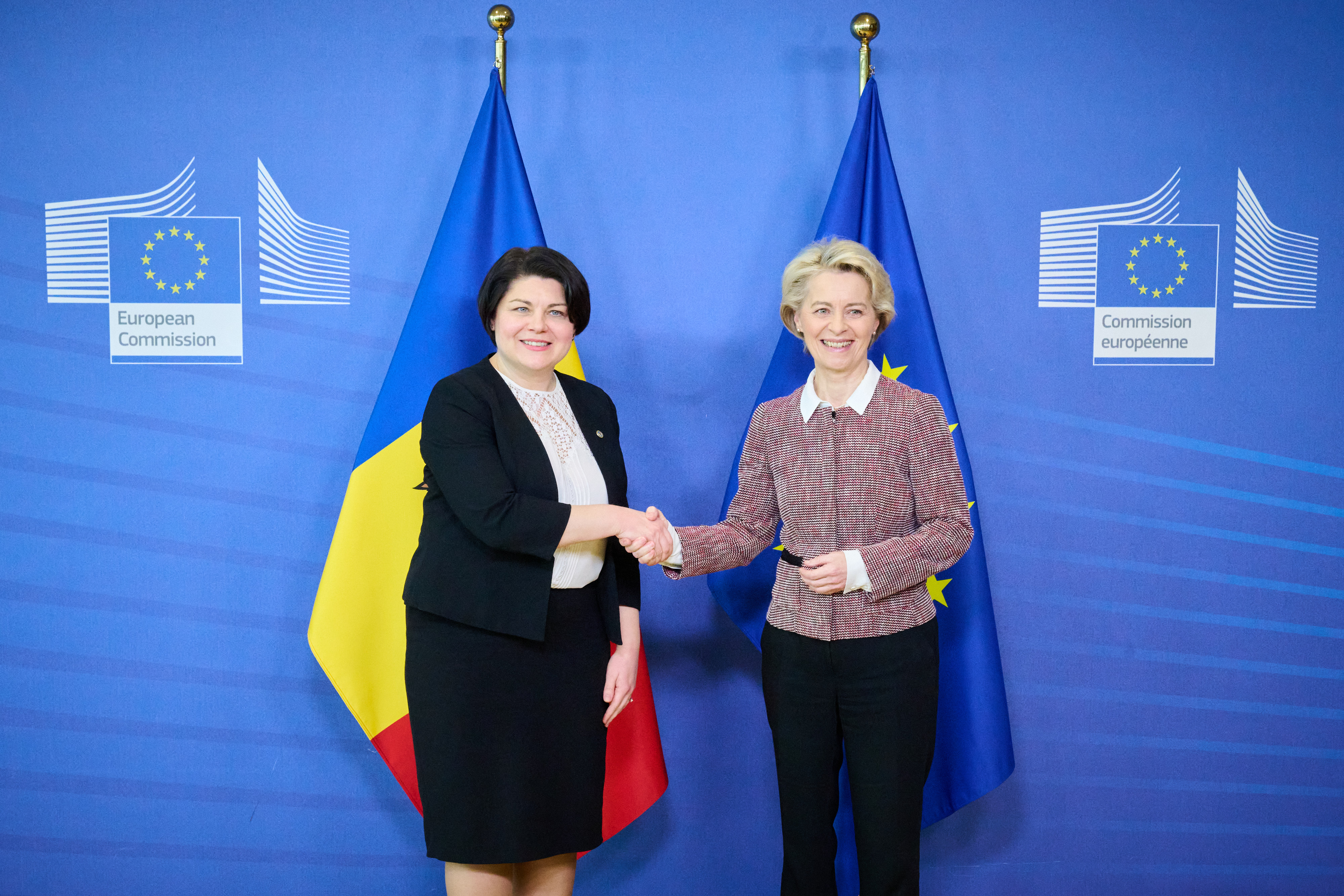
Moldovan Prime Minister Natalia Gavrilița with President of the European Commission Ursula von der Leyen in Brussels, 6 February 2023

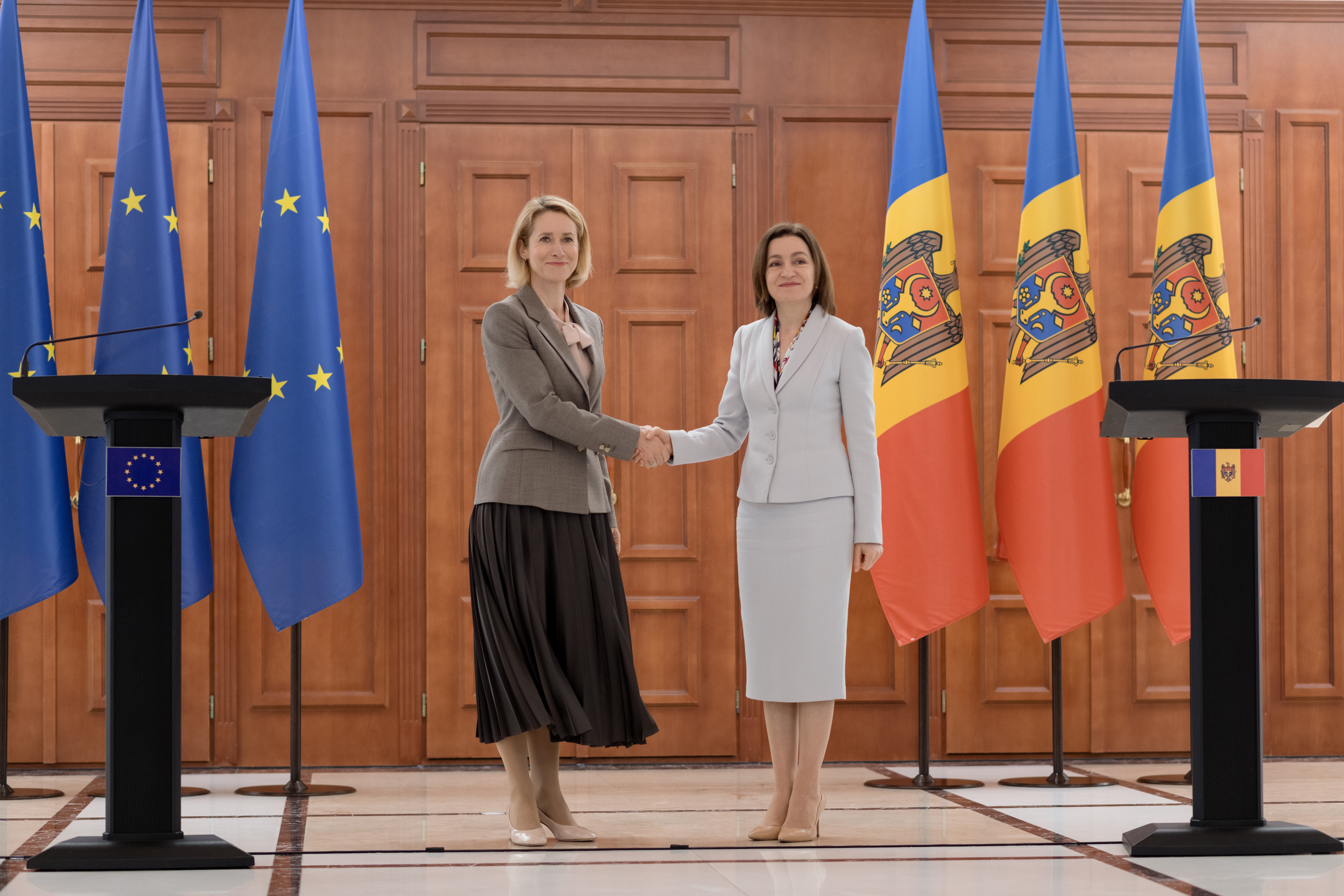
Moldovan President Maia Sandu with High Representative of the Union for Foreign Affairs and Security Policy of the European Union Kaja Kallas in Chișinău, 7 May 2026

Countries that could join the European Union Current members Candidate countries Applicant / potential candidate countries Membership possible Membership not possible

The European Parliament passed a resolution in 2014 stating that "in accordance with Article 49 of the Treaty on European Union, Georgia, Moldova and Ukraine, as well as any other European country, have a European perspective and can apply for EU membership in compliance with the principles of democracy, respect for fundamental freedoms and human rights, minority rights and ensuring the rule of rights".

In April 2014, whilst visiting the Moldovan-Romanian border at Sculeni, Moldovan Prime Minister Iurie Leanca stated, "We have an ambitious target but I consider that we can reach it: doing everything possible for Moldova to become a full member of the European Union when Romania will hold the presidency of the EU in 2019". In July 2017, Andrian Candu, Moldova's speaker of parliament, said that the country aimed to submit an application for membership by late 2018 or 2019.

Some political parties within both Moldova and Romania advocate merging the two countries. Such a scenario would incorporate the current territory of Moldova into Romania and thus into the EU, though the Transnistria conflict would still be an issue. With regard to free movement of labour it could be argued that as far as individuals are concerned, Moldova is already a de facto member of the EU, since Moldovans will automatically gain a Romanian passport if they show that their ancestors were at one point Romanian (that is before the countries were split).

The integration process, however, has been hampered by many internal issues. The unresolved issue of the breakaway republic of Transnistria is a major barrier to any progress. Also, Moldova's autonomous region of Gagauzia held two referendums on 2 February 2014, where an overwhelming majority of voters rejected integration with the EU and opted for closer ties with Russia.

In the backdrop of the 2022 Russian invasion of Ukraine, President Maia Sandu signed a formal application for EU membership on 3 March 2022. On 7 March, the EU said it would formally assess Moldova's application. On 11 April, the Minister of Foreign Affairs and European Integration of Moldova Nicu Popescu received a questionnaire from the European Commission (EC) following a meeting with the European Commissioner for Neighbourhood and Enlargement Olivér Várhelyi as a result of Moldova's application for candidacy. Their response to the first part of the questionnaire was submitted back to the EC through the Delegation of the European Union to Moldova's head Janis Mazeiks by the Prime Minister of Moldova Natalia Gavrilița on 22 April, while the responses to the second part were submitted on 12 May 2022.

On 17 June 2022, the European Commission formally recommended that the European Council grant the Republic of Moldova the perspective to become a member of the European Union and candidate status for accession, with a number of conditions for the opening of accession negotiations. On 23 June, the European Council granted candidate status to Moldova.

Moldova was asked to improve the efficiency of its economy; reduce corruption; better enforce property rights; reduce the size of state-owned enterprises; improve energy efficiency; improve the labour market; comprehensively reform the judicial system and prosecutions, including filling vacancies; address problems identified by the OECD, Office for Democratic Institutions and Human Rights, and Venice Commission; improve investigations and prosecutions of corruption and implement recommendations of the National Anticorruption Centre; implement "de-oligarchisation"; reduce organised crime, improve money-laundering laws, and implement Financial Action Task Force standards; improve procurement, public administration, and delivery of public services; increase involvement of civil society in decision-making; reduce violence against women; and strengthen protections for gender equality and the human rights of vulnerable groups.

On 21 May 2023, the Pro-European rally European Moldova National Assembly took place in Chișinău, having had tens of thousands of participants.

According to the Moldovan Prime Minister, Natalia Gavrilița, Moldova's accession negotiations with the EU can begin no earlier than the autumn of 2023.

On 8 November 2023, the European Commission recommended starting accession talks with Moldova. On 14 December 2023, the European Council agreed to open accession negotiations with Ukraine, as well as Moldova. On 21 June 2024, the European Union agreed to start membership negotiations with Ukraine. Accession negotiations began on 25 June 2024, at the same time as those with Moldova.

On 20 October 2024, Moldova held a referendum (at once with the 2024 presidential elections) on whether its constitution should include the aim to join the European Union or not. The official vote-paper quoted "Do you support the amendment of the Constitution with a view to the accession of the Republic of Moldova to the European Union?" (Romanian: "Susțineți modificarea Constituției în vederea aderării Republicii Moldova la Uniunea Europeană?") and aimed to change the Constitution towards the all-time goal of integration within the European Union.

The 2024 referendum ended with a minor advantage of the pro-European stance of the Moldovan people, the results being exceptionally close. 50.39% of Moldovan citizens voted for the pro-European stance, while 49.61% of the citizens voted against the pro-European stance (and by default voted for a pro-Russian stance). Multiple people support the idea of Russian involvement in the voting. Earlier in the year, an investigation conducted by the newspaper Ziarul de Gardă revealed the existence of a criminal enterprise headed by Ilan Shor, which received $15 million from the Russian government (the admissions were recorded on camera). Those funds were then distributed to around 130,000 people to bribe voters and spread disinformation against the European Union.

The earliest date Moldova is expected to join the European Union is 2030.

== Delegation ==
The Delegation of the European Union to Moldova was opened in Chișinău in October 2005, having the status of a diplomatic mission and officially represents the EU in the Republic of Moldova.

Delegations such as the one in Moldova exist all over the world. Altogether there are over 136.

The Delegation's mandate includes:

- Promotion of the political and economic relations between the countries of accreditation and the European Union;
- Monitoring the implementation of the Partnership and Cooperation Agreements (PCA) between the EU and Moldova;
- Informing the public of the development of the EU and to explain and defend individual EU policies;
- Participating in the implementation of the EU's external assistance programmes (mainly TACIS, FSP, ENP), focusing on the support of democratic development and good governance, regulatory reform and administrative capacity building, poverty reduction and economic growth.

== EU Partnership Mission in Moldova ==
At a meeting of the EU Foreign Affairs Council, Moldovan foreign minister Nicu Popescu expressed an interest in the deployment of a Common Security and Defence Policy mission in Moldova. On 21 March 2023, Josep Borrell told the Schuman Security and Defence Forum in Brussels that the EU is planning a civilian mission in Moldova to support the country in countering hybrid threats. The mission was formally established by the Council of the European Union on 24 April 2023 and became operational during the second summit of the European Political Community which was hosted by Moldova on 1 June 2023.

== Alliance For European Integration ==
In August 2009, four Moldovan political parties agreed to create a governing coalition called the Alliance for European Integration. The Liberal Democratic Party, Liberal Party, Democratic Party, and Our Moldova committed themselves to achieving European integration and promoting a balanced, consistent and responsible foreign policy.

- Alliance for European Integration (2009–2013)
- Pro-European Coalition (2013–2015)
- Political Alliance for a European Moldova (2015)
- Alliance for European Integration III (2015–2016)

== EU–Moldova summit ==
António Costa, President of the European Council, and Ursula von der Leyen, President of the European Commission, will be meeting Maia Sandu, President of Moldova and the leadership of Moldovan authorities, in Chișinău on 4 July 2025 for the first EU-Moldova summit.

== Public opinion ==
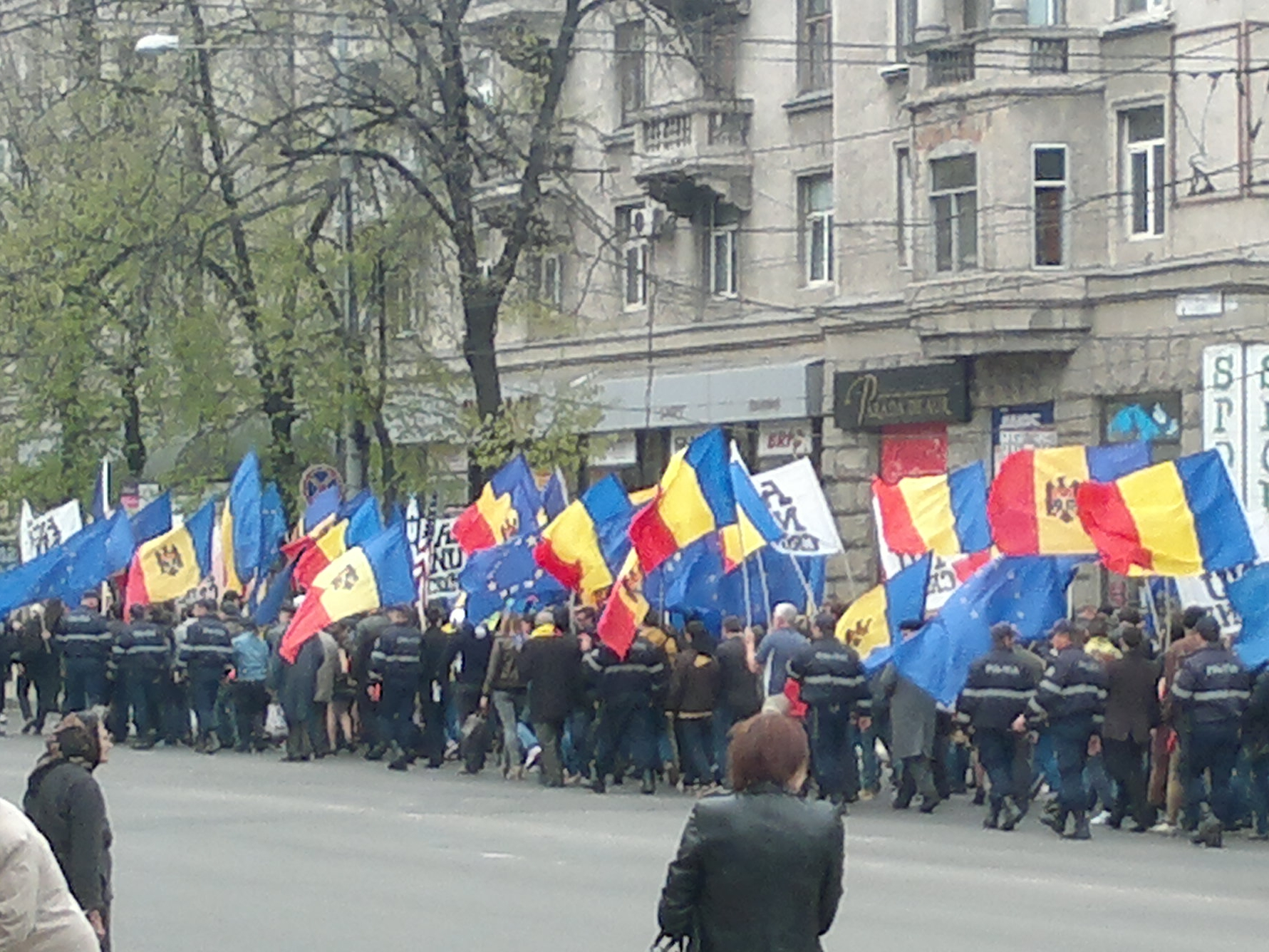
Pro-European demonstration in Chișinău, 6 April 2014.

On 2 February 2014, the Autonomous Territorial Unit of Gagauzia held two referendums on European integration. In one, 98.4% voted in favour of joining the Customs Union of Belarus, Kazakhstan, and Russia, while in the second 97.2% opposed further integration with the EU. 98.9% also supported the proposition that Gagauzia could declare independence if Moldova unified with Romania. There is concern in Gagauzia that Moldova's integration with the EU could lead to such a unification with EU member Romania, which is unpopular in the autonomous region.

A poll in June 2018 found that 46% preferred that Moldova join the EU versus 36% that preferred to join the Eurasian Economic Union.

Date	Question	For	Against	Abstain	Don't know
September 2014 – IMAS	EU membership	47%	35%	8%	11%
September 2014 – IMAS	Enter Customs Union of Belarus, Kazakhstan, and Russia	48%	35%	8%	9%
November 2014 – IMAS	EU membership	51%	36%	7%	7%
November 2014 – IMAS	Enter Customs Union of Belarus, Kazakhstan, and Russia	47%	35%	6%	12%

A March 2022 survey conducted by Magenta Consulting found that, after president Maia Sandu announced that her government had officially submitted an application for membership of the European Union, 61% of Moldovans (40% 'totally', 21% 'rather') were in favour of EU membership, up from 52% before the start of the 2022 Russian invasion of Ukraine.

Date	Question	Totally support	Rather support	Rather don't support	Don't support at all	Don't know/No answer
March 2022 – Magenta	EU membership	40%	21%	10%	21%	8%

In May 2022, a poll in Moldova found that 56.1% supported EU membership.

== Euroscepticism in Moldova ==
Moldova has several Eurosceptic parties including the left-wing Party of Socialists of the Republic of Moldova (PSRM) (1997–present), which has 22 seats in the 101-seat parliament, the conservative Șor Party (1998–present), which has 6 seats, and the left-wing Our Party (PN) (2014–present), which has no seats.

== Moldova's foreign relations with EU member states ==
- Austria
- Belgium
- Bulgaria
- Croatia
- Cyprus
- Czech Republic
- Denmark
- Estonia
- Finland
- France
- Germany
- Greece
- Hungary
- (Republic of Ireland) Ireland
- Italy
- Latvia
- Lithuania
- Luxembourg
- Malta
- Netherlands
- Poland
- Portugal
- Romania
- Slovakia
- Slovenia
- Spain
- Sweden

== See also ==
- Accession of Armenia to the European Union
- Accession of Georgia to the European Union
- Accession of Ukraine to the European Union
- Association Trio
- Moldova–European Union Association Agreement
- Moldova–NATO relations
- Moldova–Romania relations
- Eastern Europe
- Eastern Partnership
- Potential enlargement of the European Union
- Euronest Parliamentary Assembly
- Energy Community
- Armenia–European Union relations
- Azerbaijan–European Union relations
- Georgia–European Union relations
- Ukraine–European Union relations
- INOGATE
