= Moldova–Sweden relations =

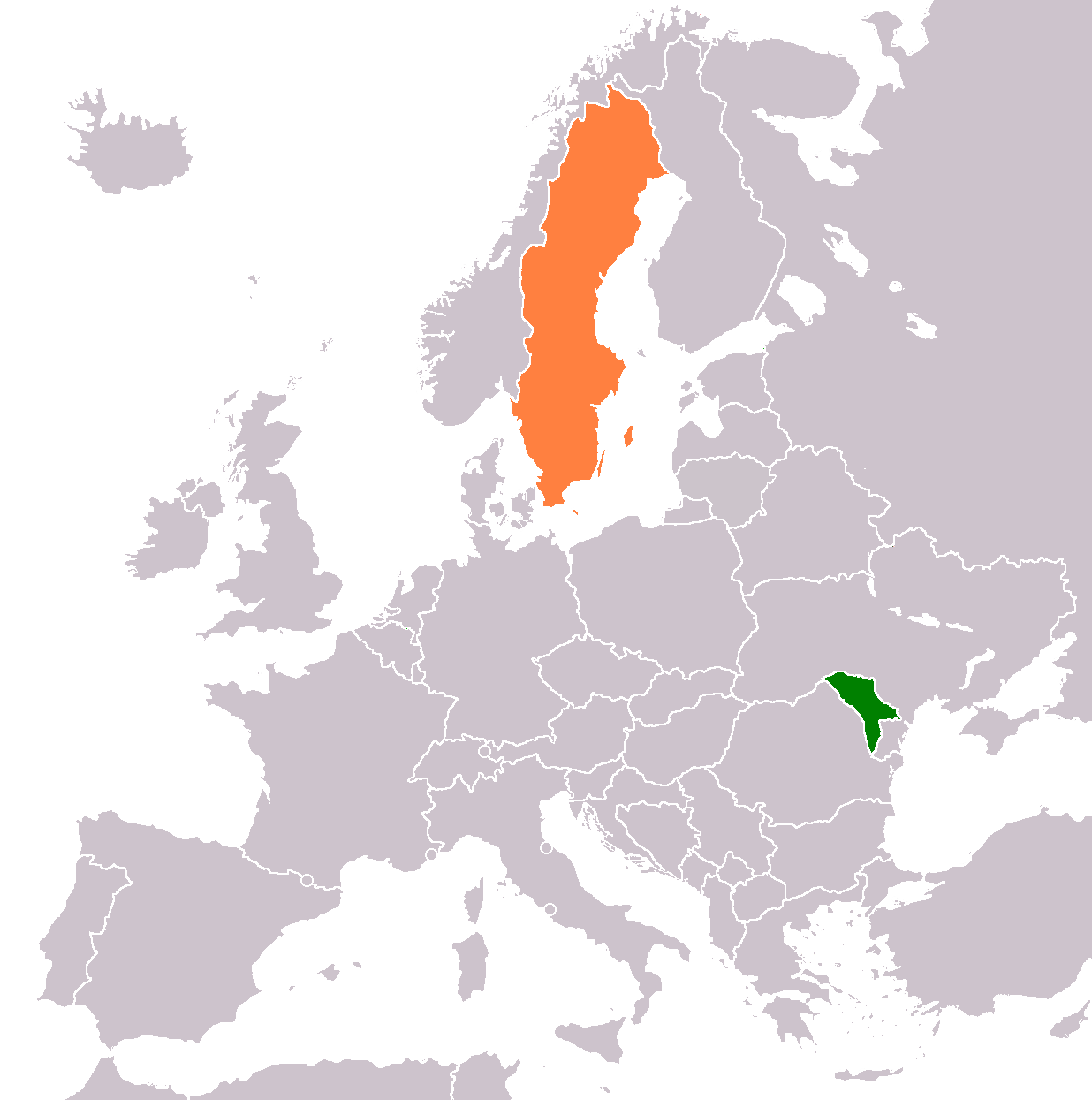

- Moldova: Sweden

Moldova–Sweden relations are the bilateral relations between Moldova and Sweden. Moldova has an embassy in Stockholm. Sweden has an embassy in Chișinău.

Sweden is a member of the European Union, which Moldova applied for in 2022. Both countries are full members of the Council of Europe and the Organization for Security and Co-operation in Europe.

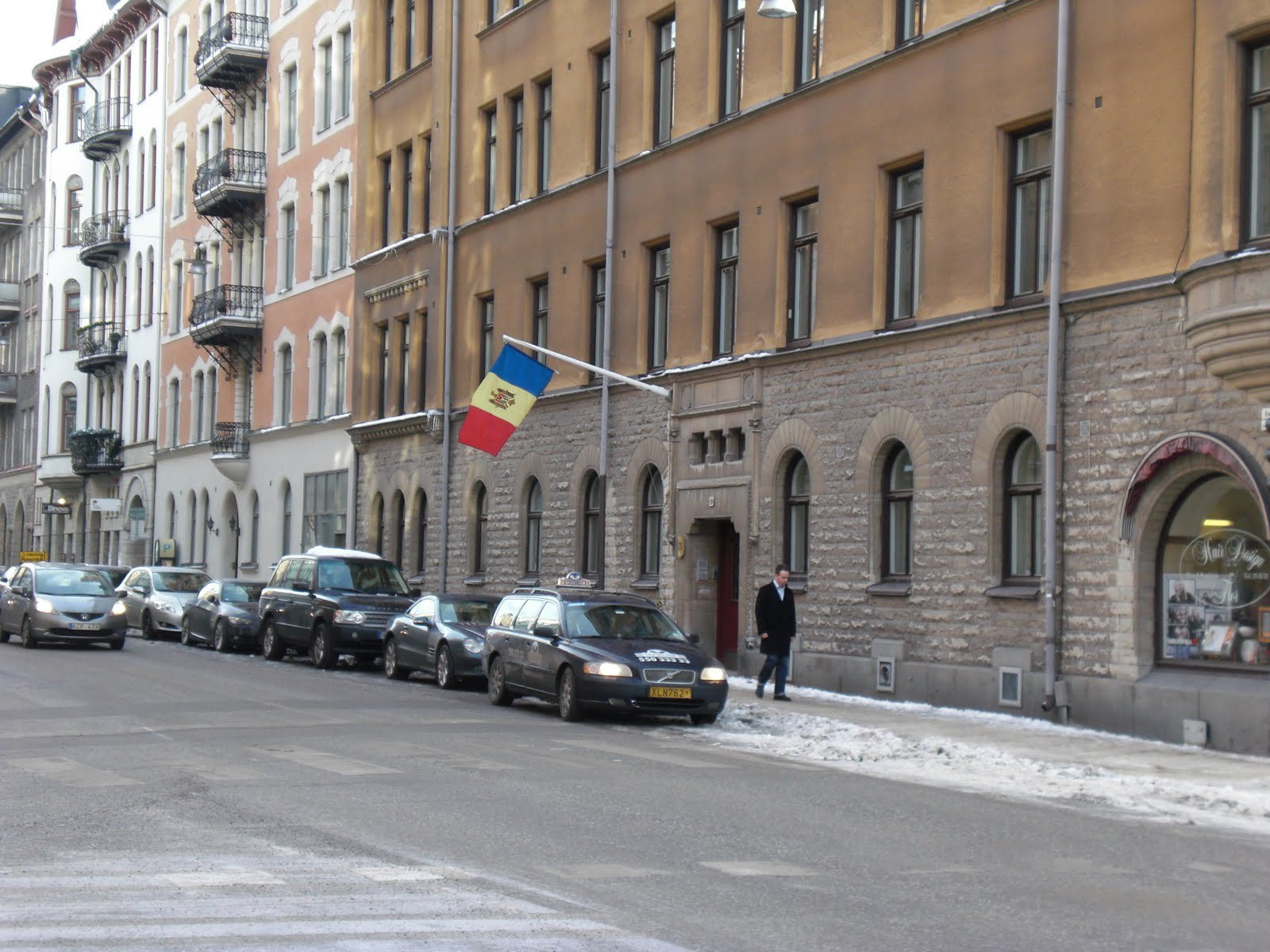
Embassy of Moldova in Stockholm

== Swedish assistance ==
Sweden is one of Moldova's top donors. From 1996, Sweden provided Moldova with technical assistance worth 30 million dollars, which significantly helped strengthen sectors such as: protection of human rights, democracy, good governance, public health, education, agriculture, energy, infrastructure, transport and the private sector. Much of the aid is delivered through the Swedish International Development Agency.

In 2007, the Swedish Government established the 2007–2010 strategy of cooperation with Moldova, which sees 11 million euros in financial assistance annually for three important sectors: good governance, strengthening of competitiveness in the rural area and reduction of vulnerability in the energy sector.

== International organizations ==
While Sweden joined the EU in 1995, Moldova is a candidate country, while Sweden joined NATO in 2024, Moldova is not a member.

== Resident diplomatic missions ==
- Moldova has an embassy in Stockholm.
- Sweden has an embassy in Chișinău.

== See also ==
- Foreign relations of Moldova
- Foreign relations of Sweden
