= Potential accession of Moldova to the European Union =

Ongoing accession process of Moldova to the EU

Process of potential accession of Moldova to the European Union
- Status: Candidate negotiating (screening complete)
- Earliest possible entry: 2030
Application
Potential candidate	17 June 2022
Membership application	3 March 2022
Candidate status	23 June 2022
Screened & negotiations commence	22 September 2025
Negotiations
Clusters unopen	2
Chapters unopen	9
Clusters open	4
Chapters open	24
Clusters closed	0
Chapters closed	0 0% complete
Memberships & Treaties
Association Agreement
1 July 2016
Economic and monetary policy
EU Free Trade Agreement	Free trade area part of the Moldova-EU Association Agreement
World Trade Organization (WTO)	The Republic of Moldova has been a member of WTO since 26 July 2001
Euro & the Eurozone	The euro is widely accepted in Moldova, although it has no formal approval, and the official currency of the country is the Moldovan leu
Travel
Energy
Energy Community	Member since March 2010
Euratom	The Republic of Moldova has no nuclear power plants and research reactors and has no plans to introduce in the near future nuclear energy as an option for power generation or any research instrument.
ENTSO-E	Moldelectrica has been an Observer Member since 22 November 2023
Foreign and military policy
North Atlantic Treaty Organization (NATO)	Individual Partnership Action Plan since 19 May 2006; Neutrality is enshrined in Moldova's Constitution, meaning NATO accession is unlikely, excluding a constitutional reform; Main article: Moldova–NATO relations
Organization for Security and Co-operation in Europe (OSCE)	Member since 30 January 1992
Human rights and international courts
Council of Europe (CoE)	Moldova became a member of the Council of Europe on 13 July 1995
International Criminal Court (ICC)	On 12 October 2010, the Republic of Moldova confirmed ratification of the Rome Statute
International Court of Justice (ICJ)	Moldova has been entitled to appear before the Court since 2 March 1992
Impact (27+1)
Population	446,828,803	450,900,630 ▲0.5%
Area	4,233,262 km^{2} 1,634,472 mi^{2}	4,267,105 km^{2} 1,647,539 mi^{2} ▲1% incl. Transnistria
HDI	0.896	0.891 ▼0.5%
GDP (PPP)	$25.399 trillion	$25.447 trillion ▲0.1%
GDP per capita (PPP)	$56,928	$56,437 ▼0.1%
GDP	$17.818 trillion	$17.834 trillion ▲0.1%
GDP per capita	$39,940	$39,552 ▼0.1%
Gini	30.0	29.86 ▼0.1%
Official Languages	24	24 (no changes); Romanian is the official language of Moldova and it is already an official language of the EU since Romania acceded to the EU in 2007.

The potential accession of Moldova to the European Union (EU) is on the agenda for future enlargement of the EU.

Following an application by Moldova in March 2022, Moldova was officially granted candidate status by the EU on 22 June 2022.

On 14 December 2023, the European Council decided to open accession negotiations with Moldova. Accession negotiations officially began on 25 June 2024, simultaneously with those with Ukraine. Moldova set a target date of 2028 for EU Accession.

It is one of nine current EU candidate countries, together with Albania, Bosnia and Herzegovina, Georgia, Montenegro, North Macedonia, Serbia, Turkey and Ukraine.

== History ==
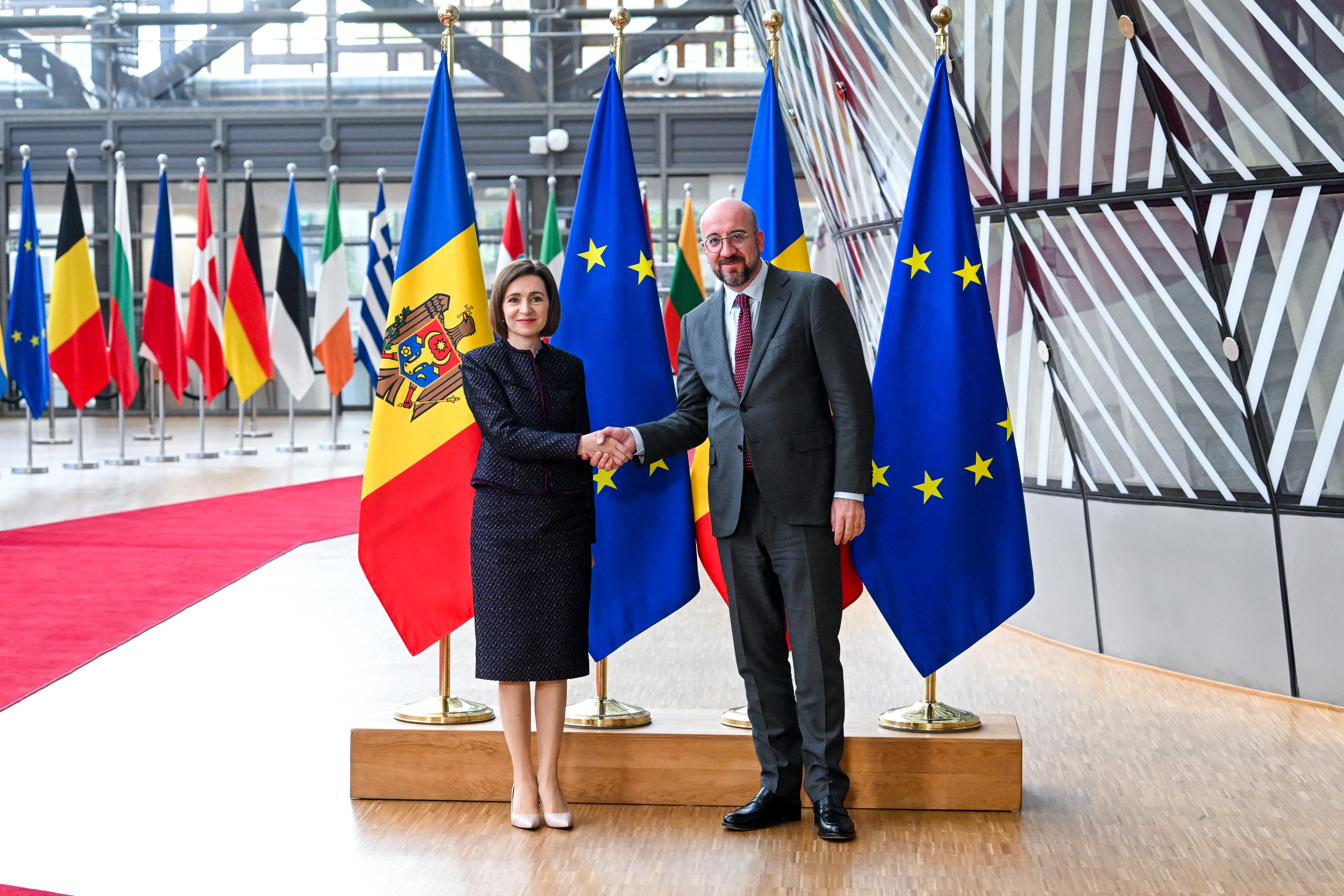
Moldovan President Maia Sandu with President of the European Council Charles Michel in Brussels, 29 April 2024

=== European perspective ===
The European Parliament passed a resolution in 2014 stating that "in accordance with Article 49 of the Treaty on European Union, Georgia, Moldova and Ukraine, as well as any other European country, have a European perspective and can apply for EU membership in compliance with the principles of democracy, respect for fundamental freedoms and human rights, minority rights and ensuring the rule of rights".

=== Membership application ===
After the outbreak of the Russian invasion of Ukraine, President of Moldova Maia Sandu signed the application for EU membership on 3 March 2022, together with Igor Grosu, President of the Moldovan Parliament; and Natalia Gavrilița, Prime Minister of Moldova.

=== Questionnaire ===
On 11 April 2022, the Minister of Foreign Affairs and European Integration of Moldova Nicu Popescu received a questionnaire from the European Commission (EC) following a meeting with the European Commissioner for Neighbourhood and Enlargement Olivér Várhelyi as a result of Moldova's application for candidacy. The response to the first part of the questionnaire was submitted back to the EC through the Delegation of the European Union to Moldova's head Janis Mazeiks by the Prime Minister of Moldova Natalia Gavrilița on 22 April, while the responses to the second part were submitted on 12 May 2022.

=== Recommendation ===
On 17 June 2022, the European Commission formally recommended that the European Council grant the Republic of Moldova the perspective to become a member of the European Union and candidate status for accession, with a number of conditions for the opening of accession negotiations.

In 2026, in a letter addressed to European Council President António Costa, European Commission President Ursula von der Leyen and Cypriot President Nikos Christodoulides, German Chancellor Friedrich Merz argued that Moldova and the Western Balkan candidate states should be brought closer to the European Union through “innovative solutions” and an accelerated accession process. He proposed measures such as privileged access to the EU internal market, closer participation in EU institutions and gradual integration into specific EU policy areas prior to full membership.

=== Candidacy ===
On 23 June 2022, Moldova received the status of candidate together with Ukraine. Both countries received candidate status under the commitment of structural reforms. Moldova's structural reforms include:

1. improving economic efficiency
2. reducing corruption
3. better enforcing property rights
4. reducing the size of state-owned enterprises
5. improving energy efficiency
6. improving the labour market

On 22 June 2023, EU Neighbourhood and Enlargement Commissioner Olivér Várhelyi provided an oral update on Moldova's progress toward the reforms.

On 13 September 2023, during the State of the European Union Address, President of the European Commission, Ursula von der Leyen stated that the future of Moldova is "in our Union".

In its June 2024 EU enlargement report, the European Commission expressed concern over the dismissal of Octavian Armașu as governor of National Bank of Moldova as a risk to good governance and central bank independence in Moldova. His dismissal was likewise scrutinised by the International Monetary Fund.

On 20 October 2024, Moldova narrowly voted to amend its constitution to include the aim of becoming a European Union member state in the 2024 Moldovan European Union membership constitutional referendum.

On 28 September 2025, the pro-European Party of Action and Solidarity retained power in the parliamentary election. This was welcomed by President von der Leyen as a vote for "Europe. Democracy. Freedom".

On 11 July 2026, the new designated prime minister, Vasile Tofan, stated that the goal of his cabinet would be to sign an agreement on EU accession by the end of 2028.

== Negotiations ==
Maia Sandu with António Costa and Ursula von der Leyen in 2025

The 2023 enlargement package report was released by the European Commission on 8 November 2023, including updates on Moldova's acquis alignment and a recommendation for the Council to open accession negotiations.

On 14 December 2023, the European Council decided to open accession negotiations with Moldova. On 21 June 2024, the European Union agreed to start membership negotiations with Ukraine. Accession negotiations officially opened on 25 June 2024, at the same time as those with Ukraine. Accession negotiations on the first cluster, Fundamentals, were expected to be officially opened in April 2025.

The screening process was completed on 22 September 2025. Informal opening of all chapters began on 17 March 2026 to bypass Hungary's veto, and the first cluster was officially opened on 15 June 2026.

During the Third Accession Conference with Moldova on 14 July 2026, Cluster 6 (External Relations) was formally opened along with the two chapters inside of it: Chapter 30 (External Relations) and Chapter 31 (Foreign, Security & Defence Policy).

On 10 September 2026, Euronews reported that the European Commission was having to redirect internal resources to keep up with the speed of Moldova's reforms for its EU accession process, which had outstripped the department's capacity to keep pace with it.

During the COREPER meeting on 7 October 2026, the 27 EU ambassadors approved the screening letters for both Ukraine and Moldova for Cluster 2 (Internal Market) and Cluster 3 (Competitiveness and Inclusive Growth) after Hungary dropped its opposition amid the approval of legislation on the rights of the ethnic minorities in Ukraine by the Ukrainian parliament. Clusters 2 and 3 were formally opened during the 4th Accession Conference on 13 October 2026.

As a senior EU official told The Kyiv Independent for an article published on 16 October 2026, Moldova was adopting EU laws faster than any country since Hungary in 2002. The same news outlet cited a EU official well-experienced in enlargement work for a 3 November article stating the pace of Moldova's progress was virtually unmatched in the EU's history, Hungary's 2002 reform drive being the only "with anything close to that level of enthusiasm".

On 4 November 2026, the European Commission published its 2026 report on Moldova, covering the period from 1 September 2025 to 1 September 2026. It stated that all six negotiating clusters were ready to be opened following the completion of screening, and assessed Moldova as having made good progress in 25 of the 33 negotiating chapters, some progress in six, limited progress in one (chapter 4) and very good progress in one (chapter 31). Energy, customs union, and foreign, security and defence policy (chapters 15, 29 and 31) were assessed as having a good level of preparation, while financial and budgetary provisions (chapter 33) was rated lowest. On the fundamentals, the report rated Moldova as moderately prepared in public administration reform, the judiciary and freedom of expression, and between some and a moderate level of preparation in the fight against corruption, with good progress in each.

The Commission's 2026 enlargement communication, published the same day, included indicative roadmaps for the four candidates furthest advanced in negotiations: Montenegro, Albania, Moldova and Ukraine. The Commission described Moldova's objective of closing accession negotiations by early 2028 as ambitious but achievable, provided the current pace of reforms is maintained. The roadmap proposes an initial priority schedule for the provisional closure of 25 chapters in 2027, nine in the first half of the year and sixteen in the second, and states that it may be revised if the pace of reforms allows earlier or additional closures. A chapter can be provisionally closed only after the EU has verified that its closing benchmarks have been met.

Indicative priority schedule for provisional closure of chapters in 2027
Cluster	First half of 2027	Second half of 2027	Not in the 2027 schedule
1. Fundamentals	-	-	5. Public Procurement; 18. Statistics; 23. Judiciary & Fundamental Rights; 24. Justice, Freedom & Security; 32. Financial Control
2. Internal Market	4. Free Movement of Capital; 7. Intellectual Property Law	1. Free Movement of Goods; 2. Freedom of Movement For Workers; 3. Right of Establishment & Freedom To Provide Services; 6. Company Law; 8. Competition Policy; 9. Financial Services; 28. Consumer & Health Protection	-
3. Competitiveness and Inclusive Growth	10. Digital transformation & Media; 25. Science & Research; 26. Education & Culture; 29. Customs Union	16. Taxation; 17. Economic & Monetary Policy; 19. Social Policy & Employment; 20. Enterprise & Industrial Policy	-
4. Green Agenda and Sustainable Connectivity	-	14. Transport Policy; 15. Energy; 21. Trans-European Networks; 27. Environment & Climate Change	-
5. Resources, Agriculture and Cohesion	13. Fisheries	12. Food Safety, Veterinary & Phytosanitary Policy	11. Agriculture & Rural Development; 22. Regional Policy & Coordination of Structural Instruments; 33. Financial & Budgetary Provisions
6. External Relations	30. External Relations; 31. Foreign, Security & Defence Policy	-	-

Chapter and screening dates
	Progression	33 / 33 100% complete	33 / 33 100% complete	24 / 33 72.7% complete	0 / 33 0% complete
Cluster	Acquis chapter	Screening started	Screening completed	Chapter opened	Chapter closed
1. Fundamentals	5. Public Procurement	2024-07-09	2024-07-11	2026-06-15	
1. Fundamentals	18. Statistics	2024-11-13	2024-11-14	2026-06-15	
1. Fundamentals	23. Judiciary & Fundamental Rights	2024-10-15	2024-10-17	2026-06-15	
1. Fundamentals	24. Justice, Freedom & Security	2024-09-23	2024-09-26	2026-06-15	
1. Fundamentals	32. Financial Control	2024-10-14	2024-10-14	2026-06-15	
2. Internal Market	1. Free Movement of Goods	2025-02-18	2025-02-21	2026-10-13	
2. Internal Market	2. Freedom of Movement For Workers	2024-12-03	2024-12-03	2026-10-13	
2. Internal Market	3. Right of Establishment & Freedom To Provide Services	2024-12-05	2024-12-06	2026-10-13	
2. Internal Market	4. Free Movement of Capital	2024-12-16	2024-12-16	2026-10-13	
2. Internal Market	6. Company Law	2025-03-20	2025-03-20	2026-10-13	
2. Internal Market	7. Intellectual Property Law	2024-12-17	2024-12-18	2026-10-13	
2. Internal Market	8. Competition Policy	2025-01-20	2025-01-22	2026-10-13	
2. Internal Market	9. Financial Services	2025-02-03	2025-02-04	2026-10-13	
2. Internal Market	28. Consumer & Health Protection	2025-03-17	2025-03-19	2026-10-13	
3. Competitiveness and Inclusive Growth	10. Information Society & Media	2025-03-27	2025-03-28	2026-10-13	
3. Competitiveness and Inclusive Growth	16. Taxation	2025-05-15	2025-05-16	2026-10-13	
3. Competitiveness and Inclusive Growth	17. Economic & Monetary Policy	2025-05-21	2025-05-21	2026-10-13	
3. Competitiveness and Inclusive Growth	19. Social Policy & Employment	2025-04-03	2025-04-04	2026-10-13	
3. Competitiveness and Inclusive Growth	20. Enterprise & Industrial Policy	2025-05-22	2025-05-23	2026-10-13	
3. Competitiveness and Inclusive Growth	25. Science & Research	2025-05-12	2025-05-12	2026-10-13	
3. Competitiveness and Inclusive Growth	26. Education & Culture	2025-05-13	2025-05-13	2026-10-13	
3. Competitiveness and Inclusive Growth	29. Customs Union	2025-04-07	2025-04-08	2026-10-13	
4. Green Agenda and Sustainable Connectivity	14. Transport Policy	2025-06-10	2025-06-13		
4. Green Agenda and Sustainable Connectivity	15. Energy	2025-07-10	2025-07-11		
4. Green Agenda and Sustainable Connectivity	21. Trans-European Networks	2025-06-10	2025-07-11		
4. Green Agenda and Sustainable Connectivity	27. Environment & Climate Change	2025-06-30	2025-07-04		
5. Resources, Agriculture and Cohesion	11. Agriculture & Rural Development	2025-09-15	2025-09-17		
5. Resources, Agriculture and Cohesion	12. Food Safety, Veterinary & Phytosanitary Policy	2025-09-08	2025-09-12		
5. Resources, Agriculture and Cohesion	13. Fisheries	2025-06-02	2025-06-03		
5. Resources, Agriculture and Cohesion	22. Regional Policy & Coordination of Structural Instruments	2025-09-18	2025-09-19		
5. Resources, Agriculture and Cohesion	33. Financial & Budgetary Provisions	2025-09-22	2025-09-22		
6. External Relations	30. External Relations	2025-02-05	2025-02-05	2026-07-14	
6. External Relations	31. Foreign, Security & Defence Policy	2025-03-21	2025-03-21	2026-07-14	
Others	34. Institutions	N/A	N/A	N/A	N/A
Others	35. Other Issues	N/A	N/A	N/A	N/A

November 2026 European Commission Report
Acquis chapter	Status as of Nov 2026	Chapter Status as of October 2026
Overview	1 chapters in early stage/with some preparation, 4 chapter with some level of preparation, 11 chapters with some/moderate preparation, 8 chapters with a moderate level of preparation, 6 chapter with moderate/good preparation, 3 chapters with a good level of preparation	9 chapters unopened, 24 chapters open.
1. Free Movement of Goods	Moderately prepared	Chapter open
2. Freedom of Movement For Workers	Some / Moderate	Chapter open
3. Right of Establishment & Freedom To Provide Services	Moderately prepared	Chapter open
4. Free Movement of Capital	Moderate / Good	Chapter open
5. Public Procurement	Some / Moderate	Chapter open
6. Company Law	Some / Moderate	Chapter open
7. Intellectual Property Law	Moderate / Good	Chapter open
8. Competition Policy	Some / Moderate	Chapter open
9. Financial Services	Some / Moderate	Chapter open
10. Information Society & Media	Moderately prepared	Chapter open
11. Agriculture & Rural Development	Some level of preparation	Chapter unopened
12. Food Safety, Veterinary & Phytosanitary Policy	Moderately prepared	Chapter unopened
13. Fisheries	Moderate / Good	Chapter unopened
14. Transport Policy	Some / Moderate	Chapter unopened
15. Energy	Good level of preparation	Chapter unopened
16. Taxation	Some level of preparation	Chapter open
17. Economic & Monetary Policy	Some / Moderate	Chapter open
18. Statistics	Some level of preparation	Chapter open
19. Social Policy & Employment	Moderately prepared	Chapter open
20. Enterprise & Industrial Policy	Moderately prepared	Chapter open
21. Trans-European Networks	Some / Moderate	Chapter unopened
22. Regional Policy & Coordination of Structural Instruments	Moderately prepared	Chapter unopened
23. Judiciary & Fundamental Rights	Some / Moderate	Chapter open
24. Justice, Freedom & Security	Moderately prepared	Chapter open
25. Science & Research	Moderate / Good	Chapter open
26. Education & Culture	Moderate / Good	Chapter open
27. Environment & Climate Change	Some level of preparation	Chapter unopened
28. Consumer & Health Protection	Some / Moderate	Chapter open
29. Customs Union	Good level of preparation	Chapter open
30. External Relations	Moderate / Good	Chapter open
31. Foreign, Security & Defence Policy	Good level of preparation	Chapter open
32. Financial Control	Some / Moderate	Chapter open
33. Financial & Budgetary Provisions	Early stage / Some	Chapter unopened
34. Institutions	Nothing to adopt	Nothing to adopt
35. Other Issues	Nothing to adopt	Nothing to adopt
Legend: Well advanced Good / Well advanced Good level of preparation Moderate / Good Moderately prepared Some / Moderate Some level of preparation Early stage / Some Early stage

Report history
Clusters	Acquis Chapter	February 2023 Report	November 2023 Report	October 2024 Report	November 2025 Report	November 2026 Report
1. Fundamentals	Public administration reform	-	Some level of preparation	Some level of preparation	Some level of preparation	Moderately prepared
1. Fundamentals	23. Judiciary & Fundamental Rights	-	Some level of preparation	Some level of preparation	Some level of preparation	Some / Moderate
1. Fundamentals	24. Justice, Freedom & Security	Some level of preparation	Some level of preparation	Some level of preparation	Some level of preparation	Moderately prepared
1. Fundamentals	The existence of a functioning market economy	-	Early stage / Some	Early stage / Some	Some level of preparation	Some level of preparation
1. Fundamentals	The capacity to cope with competitive pressure and market forces within the Union	-	Early stage / Some	Early stage / Some	Early stage / Some	Some level of preparation
1. Fundamentals	5. Public Procurement	Early stage	Some level of preparation	Some level of preparation	Some level of preparation	Some / Moderate
1. Fundamentals	18. Statistics	Some level of preparation	Some level of preparation	Some level of preparation	Some level of preparation	Some level of preparation
1. Fundamentals	32. Financial Control	Early stage	Early stage	Early stage	Some level of preparation	Some / Moderate
2. Internal Market	1. Free Movement of Goods	Some level of preparation	Some level of preparation	Some level of preparation	Moderately prepared	Moderately prepared
2. Internal Market	2. Freedom of Movement For Workers	Early stage	Early stage	Early stage	Some level of preparation	Some / Moderate
2. Internal Market	3. Right of Establishment & Freedom To Provide Services	Some level of preparation	Some level of preparation	Some level of preparation	Some level of preparation	Moderately prepared
2. Internal Market	4. Free Movement of Capital	Some level of preparation	Some / Moderate	Some / Moderate	Moderately prepared	Moderate / Good
2. Internal Market	6. Company Law	Early stage	Early stage / Some	Early stage / Some	Some level of preparation	Some / Moderate
2. Internal Market	7. Intellectual Property Law	Some level of preparation	Some level of preparation	Some level of preparation	Moderately prepared	Moderate / Good
2. Internal Market	8. Competition Policy	Some level of preparation	Some level of preparation	Some level of preparation	Some level of preparation	Some / Moderate
2. Internal Market	9. Financial Services	Early stage	Some level of preparation	Some level of preparation	Some level of preparation	Some / Moderate
2. Internal Market	28. Consumer & Health Protection	Some level of preparation	Some level of preparation	Some level of preparation	Some / Moderate	Some / Moderate
3. Competitiveness; and inclusive growth	10. Digital transformation & Media	Some level of preparation	Some level of preparation	Some level of preparation	Some level of preparation	Moderately prepared
3. Competitiveness; and inclusive growth	16. Taxation	Early stage	Some level of preparation	Some level of preparation	Some level of preparation	Some level of preparation
3. Competitiveness; and inclusive growth	17. Economic & Monetary Policy	Some level of preparation	Some level of preparation	Some level of preparation	Some level of preparation	Some / Moderate
3. Competitiveness; and inclusive growth	19. Social Policy & Employment	Early stage	Some level of preparation	Some level of preparation	Some / Moderate	Moderately prepared
3. Competitiveness; and inclusive growth	20. Enterprise & Industrial Policy	Some level of preparation	Some level of preparation	Some level of preparation	Some level of preparation	Moderately prepared
3. Competitiveness; and inclusive growth	25. Science & Research	Moderately prepared	Moderately prepared	Moderately prepared	Moderately prepared	Moderate / Good
3. Competitiveness; and inclusive growth	26. Education & Culture	Some level of preparation	Some level of preparation	Some / Moderate	Moderately prepared	Moderate / Good
3. Competitiveness; and inclusive growth	29. Customs Union	Some level of preparation	Some / Moderate	Moderately prepared	Good level of preparation	Good level of preparation
4. Green agenda; and sustainable connectivity	14. Transport	Some level of preparation	Some level of preparation	Some level of preparation	Some / Moderate	Some / Moderate
4. Green agenda; and sustainable connectivity	15. Energy	Some level of preparation	Some / Moderate	Moderately prepared	Moderate / Good	Good level of preparation
4. Green agenda; and sustainable connectivity	21. Trans-European Networks	Some level of preparation	Some level of preparation	Some level of preparation	Some level of preparation	Some / Moderate
4. Green agenda; and sustainable connectivity	27. Environment & Climate Change	Early stage	Early stage	Early stage / Some	Early stage / Some	Some level of preparation
5. Resources, agriculture; and cohesion	11. Agriculture & Rural Development	Early stage	Early stage	Early stage	Early stage / Some	Some level of preparation
5. Resources, agriculture; and cohesion	12. Food Safety, Veterinary & Phytosanitary Policy	Some level of preparation	Some level of preparation	Some level of preparation	Moderately prepared	Moderately prepared
5. Resources, agriculture; and cohesion	13. Fisheries	Early stage	Early stage	Early stage	Moderately prepared	Moderate / Good
5. Resources, agriculture; and cohesion	22. Regional Policy & Coordination of Structural Instruments	Early stage	Early stage	Some level of preparation	Moderately prepared	Moderately prepared
5. Resources, agriculture; and cohesion	33. Financial & Budgetary Provisions	Early stage	Early stage	Early stage	Early stage / Some	Early stage / Some
6. External relations	30. External Relations	Moderately prepared	Moderately prepared	Moderately prepared	Moderately prepared	Moderate / Good
6. External relations	31. Foreign, Security & Defence Policy	Moderately prepared	Moderate / Good	Moderate / Good	Good level of preparation	Good level of preparation
	34. Institutions	N/A	N/A	N/A	N/A	N/A
	35. Other Issues	N/A	N/A	N/A	N/A	N/A
	Average level	1.72	1.9	1.99	2.39	2.81
Legend: 5 Well advanced 4.5 Good / Well advanced 4 Good level of preparation 3.5 Moderate / Good 3 Moderately prepared 2.5 Some / Moderate 2 Some level of preparation 1.5 Early stage / Some 1 Early stage

Chapter progress by report year
Clusters	Acquis Chapter	November 2023 Report	October 2024 Report	November 2025 Report	November 2026 Report
1. Fundamentals	Public administration reform	Some progress	Some progress	Some progress	Good progress
1. Fundamentals	23. Judiciary & Fundamental Rights	Some progress	Some progress	Some progress	Good progress
1. Fundamentals	24. Justice, Freedom & Security	Some progress	Some progress	Some progress	Good progress
1. Fundamentals	The existence of a functioning market economy	-	Some progress	Good progress	Good progress
1. Fundamentals	The capacity to cope with competitive pressure and market forces within the Union	-	Limited progress	Some progress	Good progress
1. Fundamentals	5. Public Procurement	Some progress	Some progress	Some progress	Good progress
1. Fundamentals	18. Statistics	Limited progress	Good progress	Good progress	Some progress
1. Fundamentals	32. Financial Control	Some progress	Some progress	Good progress	Good progress
2. Internal Market	1. Free Movement of Goods	Limited progress	Limited progress	Some progress	Good progress
2. Internal Market	2. Freedom of Movement For Workers	Limited progress	Limited progress	Good progress	Good progress
2. Internal Market	3. Right of Establishment & Freedom To Provide Services	Limited progress	Limited progress	Good progress	Good progress
2. Internal Market	4. Free Movement of Capital	Some progress	Some progress	Good progress	Limited progress
2. Internal Market	6. Company Law	Limited progress	Limited progress	Good progress	Some progress
2. Internal Market	7. Intellectual Property Law	Limited progress	Some progress	Some progress	Some progress
2. Internal Market	8. Competition Policy	Limited progress	Limited progress	Some progress	Good progress
2. Internal Market	9. Financial Services	Good progress	Some progress	Some progress	Good progress
2. Internal Market	28. Consumer & Health Protection	Limited progress	Some progress	Some progress	Good progress
3. Competitiveness; and inclusive growth	10. Digital transformation & Media	Good progress	Some progress	Good progress	Good progress
3. Competitiveness; and inclusive growth	16. Taxation	Good progress	Good progress	Good progress	Good progress
3. Competitiveness; and inclusive growth	17. Economic & Monetary Policy	Some progress	Limited progress	Some progress	Good progress
3. Competitiveness; and inclusive growth	19. Social Policy & Employment	Some progress	Some progress	Good progress	Good progress
3. Competitiveness; and inclusive growth	20. Enterprise & Industrial Policy	Some progress	Some progress	Some progress	Good progress
3. Competitiveness; and inclusive growth	25. Science & Research	Some progress	Some progress	Good progress	Good progress
3. Competitiveness; and inclusive growth	26. Education & Culture	Some progress	Good progress	Good progress	Good progress
3. Competitiveness; and inclusive growth	29. Customs Union	Some progress	Good progress	Good progress	Good progress
4. Green agenda; and sustainable connectivity	14. Transport	Limited progress	Some progress	Some progress	Some progress
4. Green agenda; and sustainable connectivity	15. Energy	Good progress	Good progress	Very good progress	Good progress
4. Green agenda; and sustainable connectivity	21. Trans-European Networks	Some progress	Some progress	Some progress	Some progress
4. Green agenda; and sustainable connectivity	27. Environment & Climate Change	Some progress	Good progress	Some progress	Good progress
5. Resources, agriculture; and cohesion	11. Agriculture & Rural Development	Some progress	Some progress	Some progress	Good progress
5. Resources, agriculture; and cohesion	12. Food Safety, Veterinary & Phytosanitary Policy	Some progress	Some progress	Some progress	Good progress
5. Resources, agriculture; and cohesion	13. Fisheries	Limited progress	No progress	Good progress	Good progress
5. Resources, agriculture; and cohesion	22. Regional Policy & Coordination of Structural Instruments	Limited progress	Some progress	Some progress	Good progress
5. Resources, agriculture; and cohesion	33. Financial & Budgetary Provisions	Limited progress	No progress	Some progress	Some progress
6. External relations	30. External Relations	Some progress	Some progress	Some progress	Good progress
6. External relations	31. Foreign, Security & Defence Policy	Good progress	Good progress	Good progress	Very good progress
	34. Institutions	N/A	N/A	N/A	N/A
	35. Other Issues	N/A	N/A	N/A	N/A
	Average progress	1.79	1.89	2.47	2.81
Legend: chapter progress ratings are assigned scores from -4 to 4 to calculate the "Average progress" row. 4 Very good progress 3 Good progress 2 Some progress 1 Limited progress 0 No progress -4 Backsliding

== Challenges ==
According to Octavian Calmîc, who served as Moldova's Minister of Economy from 2016 to 2017, the accession of Moldova to the EU presents potential benefits but also risks. These include the loss of agricultural productivity due to the concentration of land ownership and business operations in multinational corporations, similar to what has occurred in other EU countries. Calmîc has said that the loss of agricultural productivity could lead to a reduction in domestic food production and job losses in rural areas. Additionally, Moldova's local industries face challenges, particularly the risk of decreased competitiveness in both domestic and international markets, which could result in plant closures and unemployment. Furthermore, the energy sector is vulnerable, as Moldova may face high energy prices and a lack of investment in energy infrastructure, according to Calmîc.

== Treaties ==
=== Association Agreement ===
The EU Association Agreement (AA) was initialed on 29 November 2013 in Brussels. It was signed on 27 June 2014 and was being provisionally applied (in particular the DCFTA) starting 1 September 2014.

On 1 July 2016, the Association Agreement (AA) between the European Union and the Republic of Moldova fully came into force, following ratification by all 31 signatories.

The parties committed to co-operate and converge economic policy, legislation, and regulation across a broad range of areas, including equal rights for workers, the exchange of information and staff in the area of justice, the modernisation of Moldova's energy infrastructure, and access to the European Investment Bank. The parties committed to regular summit meetings, and meetings among ministers, other officials, and experts.

The Association Agreement commits Moldova to economic, judicial and financial reforms to converge its policies and legislation to those of the European Union.

The 30 parties are Moldova, the EU and Euratom and the 27 EU members.

==== Ratification ====
Ratification history
Signatory	Date	Institution	In favour	Against	AB	Deposited	Reference
Austria	8 July 2015	National Council	Approved			28 August 2015	
Austria	23 July 2015	Federal Council	Approved			28 August 2015	
Austria		Presidential Assent	Granted			28 August 2015	
Belgium
Belgium	23 April 2015	Chamber of Representatives	102	17	18	1 February 2016	
Belgium		Royal Assent (federal law)				1 February 2016	
Belgium	1 July 2015	Walloon; Parliament / (regional) (community)	63	2	4	1 February 2016	
Belgium	1 July 2015	Walloon; Parliament / (regional) (community)	61	2	4	1 February 2016	
Belgium	22 June 2015	German-speaking Community	16	2	1	1 February 2016	
Belgium	24 June 2015	French Community	71	0	8	1 February 2016	
Belgium	20 November 2015	Brussels Regional Parliament	69	3	3	1 February 2016	
Belgium	20 November 2015	Brussels United; Assembly / (FR language) (NL language)	53	3	1	1 February 2016	
Belgium	20 November 2015	Brussels United; Assembly / (FR language) (NL language)	14	0	2	1 February 2016	
Belgium	17 June 2015	Flemish; Parliament / (regional) (community)	83	18		1 February 2016	
Belgium	17 June 2015	Flemish; Parliament / (regional) (community)	88	19		1 February 2016	
Belgium	24 June 2015	COCOF Assembly	71	0	8	1 February 2016	
Bulgaria	24 July 2014	National Assembly	91	0	0	9 September 2014	
Bulgaria	28 July 2014	Presidential Assent	Granted			9 September 2014	
Croatia	12 December 2014	Parliament	119	0	0	24 March 2015	
Croatia	18 December 2014	Presidential Assent	Granted			24 March 2015	
Cyprus	7 May 2015	House of Representatives	Approved			18 August 2015	
Cyprus	22 May 2015	Presidential Assent	Granted			18 August 2015	
Czech Republic	18 March 2015	Senate	53	0	10	12 June 2015	
Czech Republic	9 April 2015	Chamber of Deputies	122	0	6	12 June 2015	
Czech Republic	19 May 2015	Presidential Assent	Granted			12 June 2015	
Denmark	18 December 2014	Parliament	101	8	0	18 February 2015	
Estonia	4 November 2014	Assembly	62	0	0	12 January 2015	
Estonia	13 November 2014	Presidential Assent	Granted			12 January 2015	
European Union and EAEC	13 November 2014	European Parliament	535	94	44	19 April 2016 (EAEC); 23 May 2016 (EU)	
European Union and EAEC		Council of the European Union				19 April 2016 (EAEC); 23 May 2016 (EU)	
Finland	10 March 2015	Parliament	Approved			6 May 2015	
Finland	24 April 2015	Presidential Assent	Granted			6 May 2015	
France	3 March 2015	Senate	Approved			3 July 2015	
France	16 April 2015	National Assembly	Approved			3 July 2015	
France	27 April 2015	Presidential Assent	Granted			3 July 2015	
Germany	8 May 2015	Bundesrat	Approved			22 July 2015	
Germany	26 March 2015	Federal Diet	Approved			22 July 2015	
Germany	27 May 2015	Presidential Assent	Granted			22 July 2015	
Greece	18 November 2015	Parliament	Approved			6 January 2016	
Greece	24 November 2015	Presidential Promulgation	Granted			6 January 2016	
Hungary	25 November 2014	National Assembly	133	0	6	7 April 2015	
Hungary	5 December 2014	Presidential Assent	Granted			7 April 2015	
(Republic of Ireland) Ireland	27 January 2015	Dáil Éireann	58	19	0	17 April 2015	
Italy	26 November 2015	Senate	151	35	11	3 February 2016	
Italy	29 July 2015	Chamber of Deputies	314	88	36	3 February 2016	
Italy	7 December 2015	Presidential Assent	Granted			3 February 2016	
Latvia	14 July 2014	Parliament	79	0	0	2 October 2014	
Latvia	18 July 2014	Presidential Assent	Granted			2 October 2014	
Lithuania	8 July 2014	Parliament	84	0	1	29 July 2014	
Lithuania	11 July 2014	Presidential Assent	Granted			29 July 2014	
Luxembourg	18 March 2015	Chamber of Deputies	55	2	0	12 May 2015	
Luxembourg	12 April 2015	Grand Ducal Promulgation	Granted			12 May 2015	
Malta	21 August 2014	House of Representatives	Approved			29 August 2014	
Moldova	2 July 2014	Parliament	59	4	0	23 July 2014	
Moldova	8 July 2014	Presidential Assent	Granted			23 July 2014	
Netherlands	7 July 2015	Senate	Adopted			21 September 2015	
Netherlands	7 April 2015	House of Representatives	Adopted			21 September 2015	
Netherlands	28 July 2015	Royal Promulgation	Granted			21 September 2015	
Poland	18 December 2014	Senate	79	0	0	24 March 2015	
Poland	5 December 2014	House of Representatives	420	0	0	24 March 2015	
Poland	29 December 2014	Presidential Assent	Granted			24 March 2015	
Portugal	20 March 2015	National Assembly	Approved			13 May 2015	
Portugal	22 April 2015	Presidential Assent	Granted			13 May 2015	
Romania	2 July 2014	Chamber of Deputies	284	1	1	14 July 2014	
Romania	3 July 2014	Senate	122	0	0	14 July 2014	
Romania	9 July 2014	Presidential Assent	Granted			14 July 2014	
Slovakia	23 September 2014	National Council	117	0	0	21 October 2014	
Slovakia	16 October 2014	Presidential Assent	Granted			21 October 2014	
Slovenia	13 May 2015	National Assembly	70	3	0	27 July 2015	
Slovenia	21 May 2015	Presidential Assent	Granted			27 July 2015	
Spain	27 May 2015	Senate	Approved			28 July 2015	
Spain	30 April 2015	Congress of Deputies	303	0	1	28 July 2015	
Spain		Royal Assent	Granted			28 July 2015	
Sweden	26 November 2014	Parliament	249	44	0	9 January 2015	
United Kingdom	9 March 2015	House of Lords	Approved			8 April 2015	
United Kingdom	23 February 2015	House of Commons	Approved			8 April 2015	
United Kingdom	19 March 2015	Royal Assent	Order Made			8 April 2015	

==== Malta ====
The ratification was performed in accordance with article 4(2)(b) of the Maltese European Union Act, which reads that:

"Provided that with regard to treaties and international conventions which Malta may accede to as Member State of the European Union, and treaties and international conventions which Malta is bound to ratify in its own name or on behalf of the European Community by virtue of its membership within the European Union, these shall come into force one month following their being submitted in order to be discussed by the Standing Committee on Foreign and European Affairs."

As the treaty was submitted to the Standing Committee on Foreign and European Affairs on 21 July 2014, the treaty came into force as part of the Maltese legislation on 21 August 2014.

==== United Kingdom of Great Britain and Northern Ireland ====
The ratification was based on The European Union (Definition of Treaties) (Association Agreement) (Moldova) Order 2015, made in accordance with section 1(3) of the European Communities Act 1972, after having been approved by a resolution of each House of Parliament.

The agreement applied to the United Kingdom as an EU-member state until Brexit on 31 January 2020. During the transition period that followed Brexit, the agreement until 31 December 2020, the agreement still applied to the UK. The UK and Moldova announced on 8 October 2020 an agreement replacing the EU-Moldova Association Agreement between them, which was provisionally applied from 1 January 2021.

=== Free trade area ===
The agreement established a Deep and Comprehensive Free Trade Area (DCFTA) between the EU and Moldova, including "the removal of import duties for most goods traded between the EU and Moldova" and "broad mutual access to trade in services for both partners".

== Public opinion ==
A poll in June 2018 found that 46% preferred that Moldova join the EU versus 36% that preferred to join the Eurasian Economic Union. A March 2022 survey conducted by Magenta Consulting found that, after president Maia Sandu announced that her government had officially submitted an application for membership of the European Union, 61% of Moldovans (40% 'totally', 21% 'rather') were in favour of EU membership, up from 52% before the start of the Russian invasion of Ukraine.

Date	Question	Totally support	Rather support	Rather don't support	Don't support at all	Don't know/No answer
March 2022	EU membership	40%	21%	10%	21%	8%

In May 2022, a poll in Moldova found that 56.1% supported EU membership.

Two July 2023 polls in Moldova showed respectively 63% support and 59% support for Moldova joining the EU.

A referendum on changing the constitution to include EU accession as a goal took place on 20 October 2024. There were no voting stations in Transnistria; however, residents there were free to travel to other areas of Moldova to vote. A narrow majority supported the referendum.

According to the 2025 annual survey of opinion in the Republic of Moldova, almost nine out of ten Moldovans (86%) feel their country has good relations with the EU (a ten-point increase compared to 2024). Trust in the EU is also at its highest ever level, 71%. Overall, most Moldovans (55%) have a positive image of the EU, compared to 14% who have a negative image. 60% said they supported EU membership, and 63% would vote in favour of accession if a referendum was held, compared to 26% against.

=== Gagauzia ===
On 2 February 2014, the Autonomous Territorial Unit of Gagauzia held two referendums on European integration. In one, 98.4% voted in favour of joining the Customs Union of Belarus, Kazakhstan, and Russia, while in the second 97.2% opposed further integration with the EU. 98.9% also supported the proposition that Gagauzia could declare independence if Moldova unified with Romania. There is concern in Gagauzia that Moldova's integration with the EU could lead to such a unification with EU member Romania, which is unpopular in the autonomous region.

== Schengen visa liberalisation ==
Moldovan citizens have been able to travel to the Schengen area from 28 April 2014 without a visa. However, since October 2025, Moldovans need to comply with the EU's EES system before entering any of the Schengen member countries. The application of the new ETIAS rule was postponed to at least April 2027.

== Unification of Moldova and Romania ==
There is some support for the unification of Moldova and Romania, which would incorporate the current territory of Moldova into Romania and thus into the EU. About 44% of the Moldovans that were polled in 2021 supported such a scenario.

== Impact of joining ==
Member countries	Population	Area (km^{2})	GDP (US$)	GDP per capita (US$)	Languages	Scripts
Moldova	2,996,106	30,334	16 billion	6,410	Romanian	Latin
EU27	447,007,596	4,233,262	17.046 trillion	38,134	24	3
EU27+1	450,003,702 (+0.56%)	4,263,113 (+0.71%)	17.062 trillion (+0.09%)	37,825 (−0.81%)	24	3

== See also ==
- Moldova–European Union relations
- Moldova–European Union Association Agreement
- Moldova–Romania relations
- Association Trio
- Enlargement of the European Union
- European Moldova National Assembly
- Future enlargement of the European Union
- Accession of Armenia to the European Union
- Armenia–European Union relations
- Accession of Georgia to the European Union
- Georgia–European Union relations
- Accession of Ukraine to the European Union
- Ukraine–European Union relations
- Moldova–NATO relations
