= Poles in Transnistria =

Minority in Transnistria

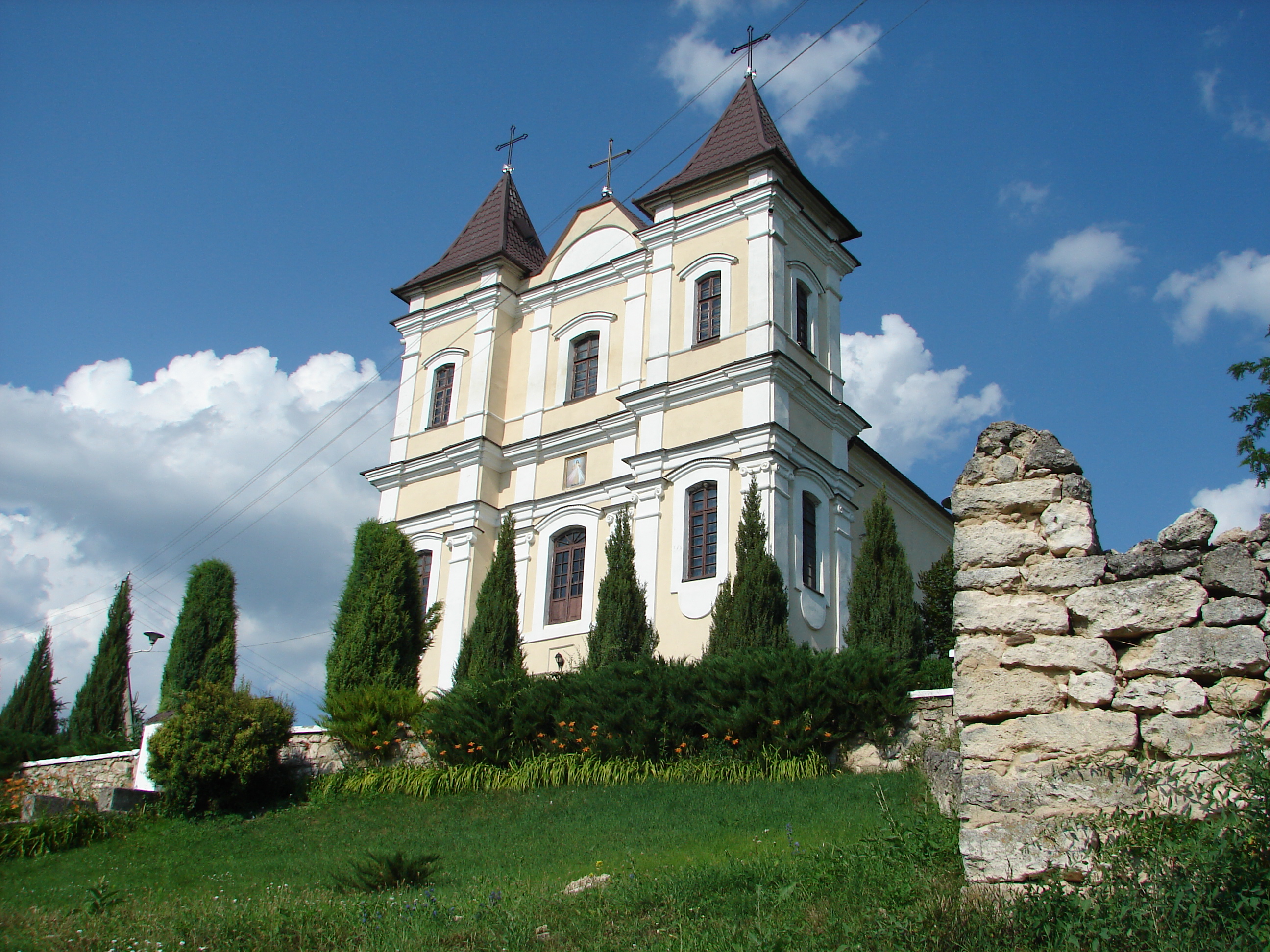
- Polish Saint Cajetan Church in Rașcov

Total population
- Estimates vary between 1,100-20,000 (2004)

Regions with significant populations
- Bendery, Rîbnița District, Camenca District, Tiraspol

Related ethnic groups
- Polish diaspora

The history of Polish people in Transnistria goes back centuries when the communities along the lower Dniester river were part of Podolia in the Polish–Lithuanian Commonwealth and later the Russian Empire.

== History ==
=== Beginnings ===
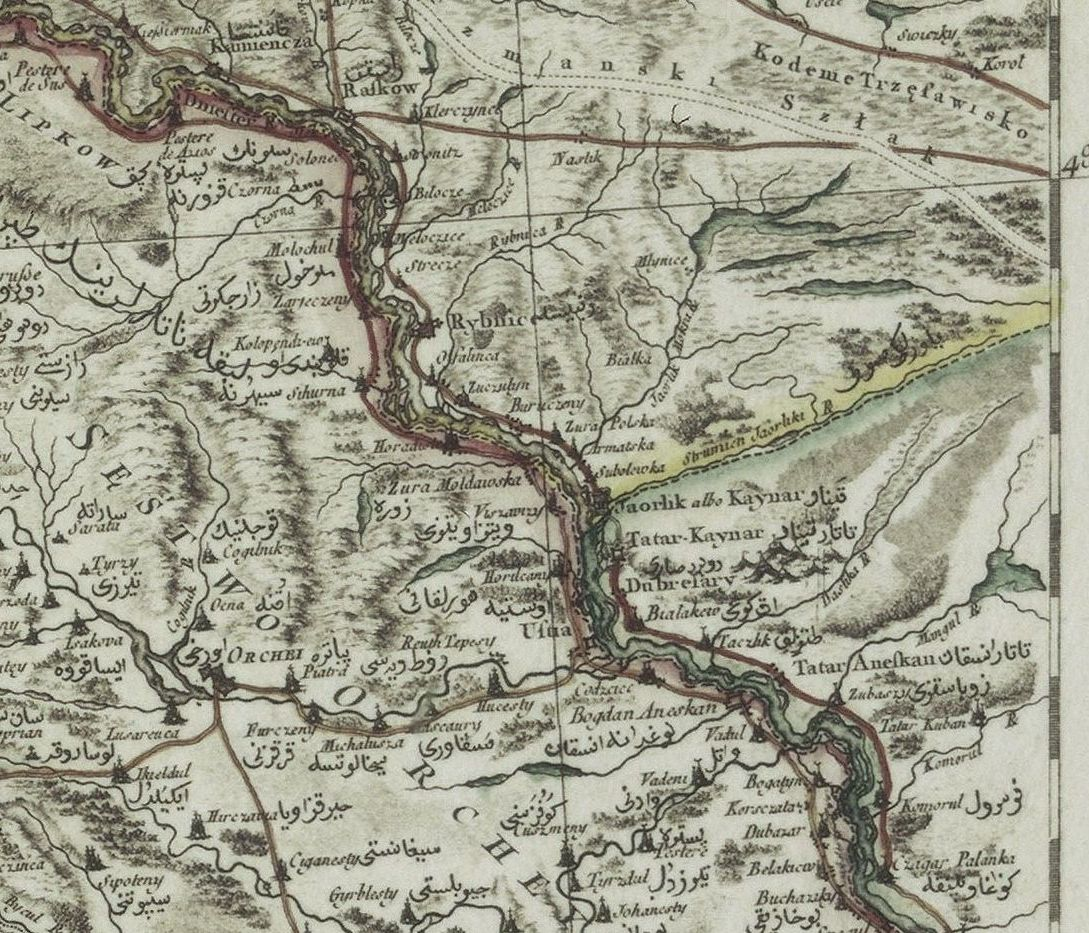
Maps illustrating the location of Bracław Voivodeship in the Polish–Lithuanian Commonwealth and from 1772 CE illustrating settlements along the border between Bracław Voivodeship in the Polish–Lithuanian Commonwealth, the Crimean Khanate, and the Principality of Moldavia

There is a lack of clarity as to whether Transnistria was part of Kievan Rus' beginning in the 11th century, and if so, to what degree. After the disintegration of Kievan Rus' because of the Mongol Invasions, this area came under the rule of the Grand Duchy of Lithuania in the 15th century as part of Podolia. Much of Transnistria remained a part of Bracław Voivodeship in the Polish–Lithuanian Commonwealth until the Second Partition of Poland in 1793.

In 1504 the Crimean Khanate conquered the southernmost portion of Transnistria south of the Iagorlîc/Jagorlyk river along with the rest of the Yedisan region which remained under the control of the Ottoman Empire until 1792. Thus the border between the two states was set on the Iagorlîc river, referred to as the Iahurlîc in Moldavian chronicles, and in Polish source as Jahorlik or Jahorłyk

=== Polish Colonization ===
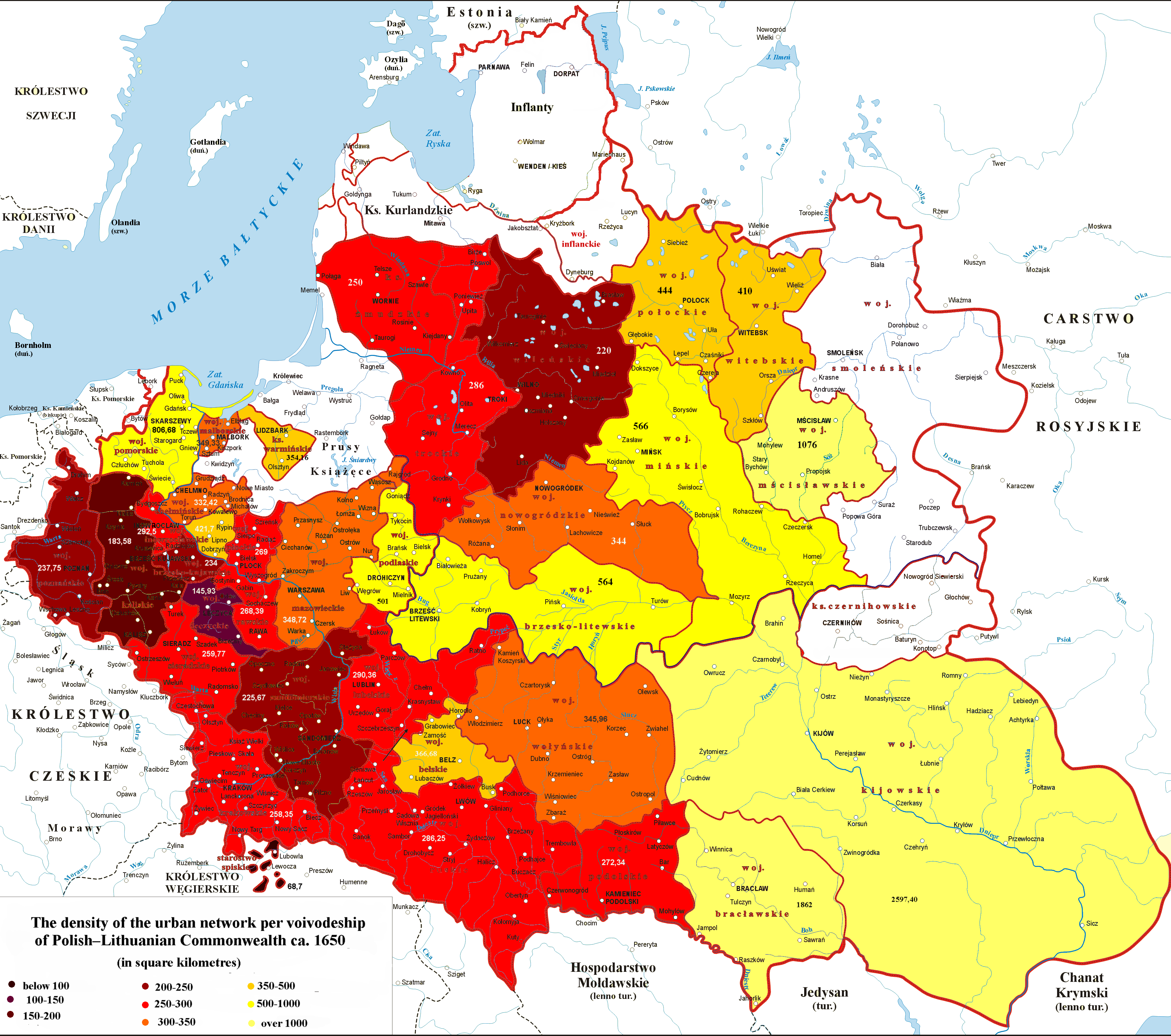
Density of urban network per voivodeship in the Polish–Lithuanian Commonwealth in 1650. Today's Transnistria region was in Bracław Voivodeship, which was significantly less densely populated than its neighboring provinces to the west because of slave raids from the Crimean Khanate.

Because of the massive slave raids and invasions launched by the Crimean Khanate, much of the southern region of the Polish–Lithuanian Commonwealth was sparsely populated. To remedy this, the 16th and 17th centuries Polish kings, in particular Stephen Báthory and Sigismund III Vasa, sponsored large-scale Polish colonization of Podolia, which includes the territories of modern Transnistria. Polish magnates were given large tracts of sparsely settled lands, while Polish petty gentry managed the estates and served as soldiers. Serfs were enticed to move into these territories by a temporary 20 year exemption from serfdom. Although most serfs were from western Ukrainian lands, a significant number of Polish serfs from central Poland also settled these estates. The latter tended to assimilate into Ukrainian society and some of them even took part in the Cossack uprisings against the landlords. Polish magnates from Ukraine played a significant political and social role within the Polish–Lithuanian Commonwealth, as did the native nobility in these areas which Polonized over time.

Polish rule at this time involved the expansion of Jesuit schools and large scale construction of ornate castles and estates that included libraries, art collections, and archives that in many cases were the equal in importance to those in Poland itself. By the late 18th century, approximately 11% of the population were Roman Catholics, most of them Poles.

=== Incorporation into the Russian Empire ===
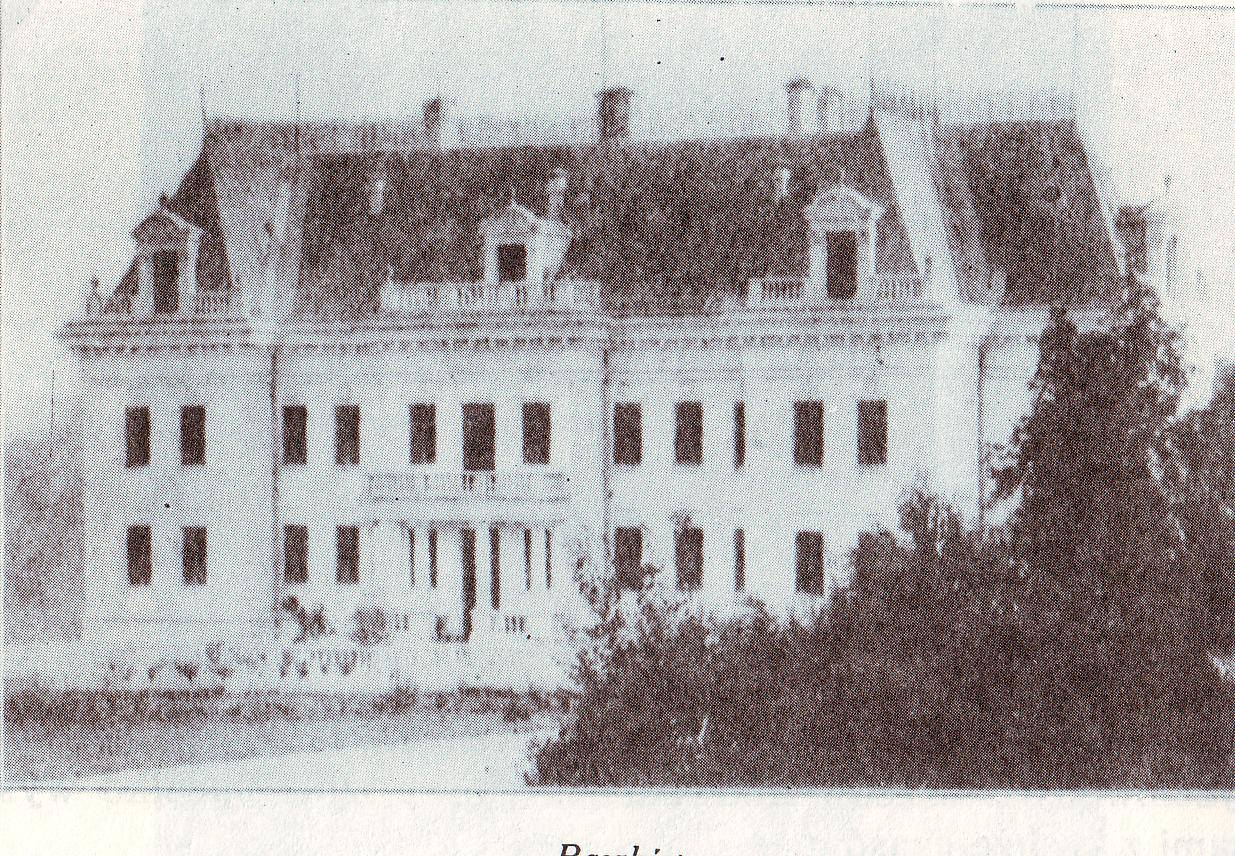
Juriewicz Palace in Rașcov, demolished by government authorities in the USSR.

At the time of the Partition of Poland, approximately ten percent of the population of all of the territories annexed by Russia were ethnically Polish. Poles included wealthy magnates with large estates, poorer nobles who worked as administrators or soldiers, and peasants. Long after this region ceased being a part of Poland, Poles continued to play an important role in both the province and in the city of Kiev. Until the failed Polish insurrection of 1830–1831, Polish continued to be the administrative language in education, government and the courts.

Under the Russian Empire, Polish society tended to stratify. The Polish magnates prospered under the Russian Empire, at the expense of the serfs and of the poorer Polish nobility whom they pushed from the land. The wealthy magnates tended to oppose the Polish insurrections, identified with their Russian landlord peers, and often moved to St. Petersburg. The Polish national movement in Ukrainian lands thus tended to be led by members of the middle and poorer gentry, who formed secret societies in places with large Polish populations. As a result of an anti-Russian insurrection in 1830, the Polish middle and poorer nobility were stripped of their legal noble status by the Russian government, and Russification policies were enacted. These Polish nobles, legally reduced to the status of peasants, often assimilated into the Ukrainian language and culture. Many of the poorer Polish nobles who became Ukrainianized in language, culture and political loyalty constituted an important element of the growing Ukrainian national movement. In spite of the ongoing migration of Poles from central Poland into Ukrainian lands, by the end of the nineteenth century only three percent of the total population of these territories reported that Polish was their first language.

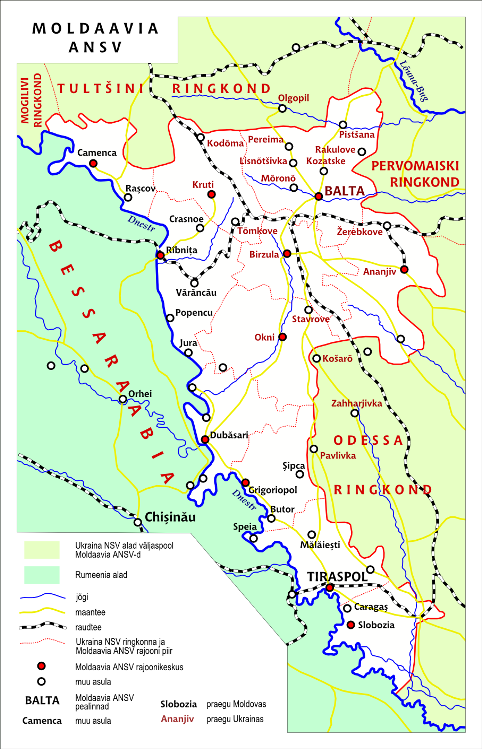
Map of the Moldavian ASSR which Transnistria was a part of.

=== Between the World Wars ===
After World War I, the advance of the Bolshevik armies, the Polish–Soviet War of 1919–1921, and the incorporation of these lands into the USSR, there was a massive exodus of Poles, particularly landowners and intelligentsia, from the former Russian Partition into Poland.".

The area that would become Transnistria was organized into the Ukrainian SSR in 1919, under which the Moldavian Autonomous Soviet Socialist Republic was created in 1924. Under Stalinist rule, the Polish community would decline further. After a brief initial period of liberalization and freedom towards Poles in the Soviet Union were subject to harassment, dispersal and mass terror. This trend increased in the late 1930s, as a result of the 1937-8 Polish Operation of the NKVD as well as the ceasing of educational instruction in the Moldavian ASSR for all non-Romanians populations in their native languages which was replaced by Ukrainian and Russian.

=== After World War II until the collapse of the USSR ===
The number of Poles in all of the regions within the former Soviet Union has been steadily decreasing over the past century. To a large extent this decline can be traced due to policies of Sovietization which aimed to destroy Polish culture in the USSR. Knowledge about the Polish community in Moldova and Transnistria was completely absent in Poland throughout the entire postward period until the collapse of the USSR. This trend was only reversed in the 1990s when Polish researchers gained the ability to conduct research in Moldova and Transnistria.

=== Present ===
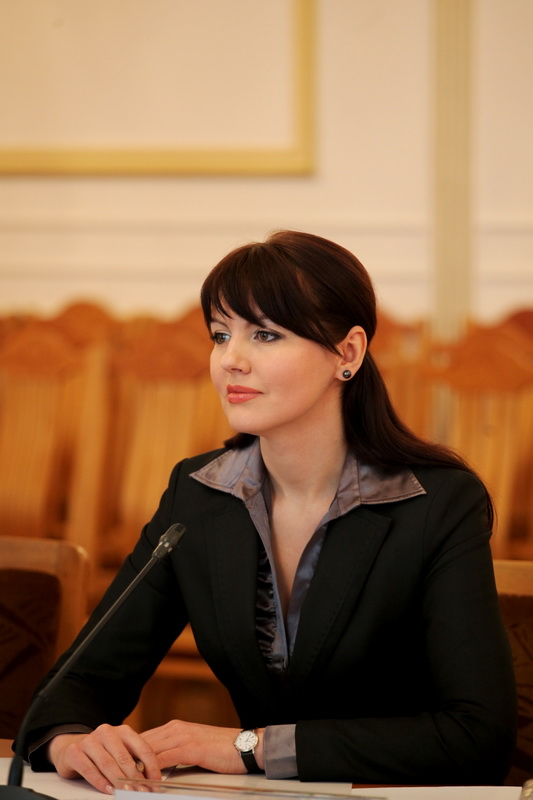
Former First Lady of Transnistria Nina Shtanski has spoken about being of Polish descent.

The 2004 Census in Transnistria reported 2% of the population (about 1,100) to be Poles. Some publications of Polonia activists and Polish diplomats mention numbers of up to 20,000 of Poles, — numbers significantly exceeding that of self-identified Poles in the census. Some authors include in their estimates people of Polish descent, while others assume people of Catholic faith (in a predominantly Eastern Orthodox country) are most probably of Polish descent; and this may include, Russians and Ukrainians with ties to Poland in their ancestry.

As a consequence of the Russian and Soviet policies towards Polish culture, only a small percentage of Poles in Transnistria today speak Polish. Some Transnistrian politicians such as former First Lady Nina Shtanski and Yevgeni Zubov are open about their Polish roots.

Since 2013, Stowarzyszenie Kultury Polskiej "Jasna Góra" - the "Jasna Góra" Association of Polish Culture has been active in Tiraspol, Transnistria

== See also ==
- Moldova–Poland relations
- Polish minority in Soviet Union
- Demographics of Transnistria
- Soviet repressions of Polish citizens (1939–1946)
