= Tomasz Grzywaczewski =

Polish journalist

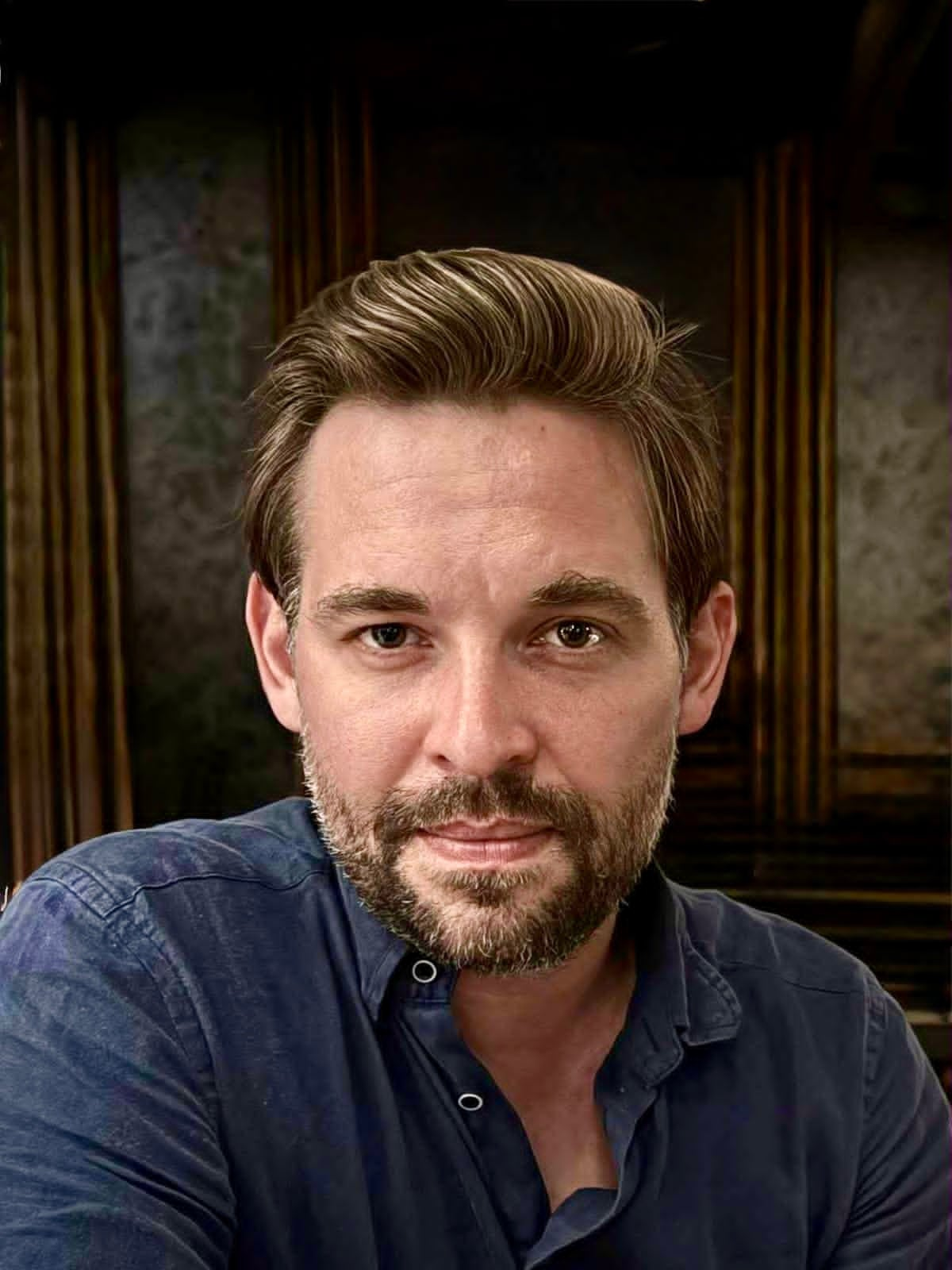
- Tomasz Grzywaczewski (2026)
- Born: Tomasz Henryk Grzywaczewski; 5 September 1986; Łódź, Poland
- Education: University of Łódź
- Occupations: journalist; writer; analyst; war correspondent; filmmaker

Tomasz Grzywaczewski (born September 5, 1986) is a Polish war correspondent, nonfiction author, geopolitical analyst and documentary filmmaker. His work focuses on Central and Eastern Europe, Russia and Ukraine, European security, NATO and transatlantic relations.

He has presented his work or participated in discussions at institutions including the Atlantic Council, the European Parliament and Georgetown University. He is an expert at the Warsaw Institute and was a visiting fellow at the Danube Institute in Budapest. He has been an International Fellow of The Explorers Club since 2014.

Grzywaczewski is the author of four nonfiction books and has directed or written documentary films and television reportage, including Erase the Nation, on the destruction of Ukrainian cultural heritage during Russia’s invasion.

== Education ==
Grzywaczewski holds a master’s degree in law from the University of Łódź and completed the Russian Security Studies Certificate program at the Daniel Morgan Graduate School of National Security in Washington, D.C.

== Journalism and war reporting ==
Grzywaczewski's field reporting has focused on armed conflicts, political crises and geopolitical developments in Eastern Europe and the post-Soviet region. He has reported from the Donbas since 2015, Nagorno-Karabakh, Turkish Kurdistan, the 2020 protests in Belarus and the 2021 migration crisis on the Poland–Belarus border. His work has frequently combined frontline reporting with analysis of security, separatism, Russian influence and political change in Central and Eastern Europe.

Following the beginning of Russia's full-scale invasion of Ukraine in February 2022, Grzywaczewski reported from Ukraine for Telewizja Polska (TVP), including from areas close to the front line. His reporting covered the military and humanitarian consequences of the war and drew on his earlier work in the Donbas and other conflict zones.

Grzywaczewski has also been a contributor to Onet.pl and has published or appeared in international outlets including ″Foreign Policy″, ″New Eastern Europe″ and CBS News. He co-hosts ″Transatlantyk″, a podcast produced by Otwarta Konserwa devoted to contemporary America, and regularly contributes geopolitical analysis and commentary to Układ Sił.

From 2022, Grzywaczewski reported from Ukraine for TVP, including frontline and recently liberated areas. His field reporting has also included the Donbas since 2015, Nagorno-Karabakh, Turkish Kurdistan, the 2020 protests in Belarus and the 2021 migration crisis on the Poland–Belarus border.

In 2024, he became the United States correspondent for Telewizja Republika, covering American politics, foreign policy and transatlantic relations. His reporting from the United States has included the 2024 presidential campaign and election, the transition to the new administration and developments in U.S. policy toward Europe, NATO, Russia and Ukraine.

== Geopolitical analysis and research ==
Alongside journalism, Grzywaczewski has worked as a geopolitical analyst on Central and Eastern Europe, Russia, Ukraine, hybrid threats, unrecognized states and European security, including NATO–Russia relations, NATO’s eastern flank and transatlantic relations. He is an expert at the Warsaw Institute and was a visiting fellow at the Danube Institute in 2024, where he participated in its geopolitical summit with The Heritage Foundation.

He has participated in academic and policy discussions in Europe and the United States, including at the Atlantic Council, the European Parliament, the 15th International Symposium ″Ideologies, Values and Political Behaviours in Central and Eastern Europe″ at the West University of Timișoara, and the Western Balkans Summit 2021 in Sofia. In 2024, he took part in the Atlantic Council discussion ″Reporters at Risk: On the Frontlines in Ukraine and Gaza″.

His academic and analytical writing has addressed secession, self-determination and quasi-states in the post-Soviet region. In 2015, ″Studia Prawnicze KUL″ published his article 'Ludowe republiki Donbasu' – granice prawa do samostanowienia a fenomen quasi-państw (The 'People's Republics of Donbas': The Limits of the Right to Self-Determination and the Phenomenon of Quasi-States), examining the Donetsk and Luhansk entities through international law. The same year, JusticeInfo.net published his analysis The Black Hole of the Quasi States on Transnistria, Abkhazia, South Ossetia and the separatist entities in eastern Ukraine. He was also a member of a University of Łódź research team working with the Catholic University of Mozambique on a project concerning human rights and the role of academic institutions in supporting rural communities.

== Non-fiction books ==
Grzywaczewski is the author of four nonfiction books:

- The Erased Border: In the Footsteps of the Second Polish Republic (Wymazana granica. Śladami II Rzeczpospolitej), Czarne, 2020. Reportage following the former borders and communities of the Second Polish Republic.
- Borders of Dreams: On Unrecognized States (Granice marzeń. O państwach nieuznawanych), Czarne, 2018. Reportage from post-Soviet unrecognized and de facto states.
- Life and Death on the Dead Road (Życie i śmierć na Drodze Umarłych), Wydawnictwo Literackie, 2015. A reportage on the Soviet Transpolar Mainline, the unfinished Stalin-era railway across northern Siberia known as the "Dead Road".
- Across the Wild East: 8,000 km in the Footsteps of the Famous Escape from the Gulag (Przez dziki Wschód. 8000 km śladami słynnej ucieczki z gułagu), Wydawnictwo Literackie, 2012. A narrative account of an 8,000-kilometre expedition from siberian Gulag toward India.

== Documentary film and television work ==
Grzywaczewski has directed, written and presented documentary films and television reportage, primarily concerning Eastern Europe, historical memory and conflict.

- Erase the Nation (2023) – director and writer. Documentary on the destruction of Ukrainian cultural heritage during Russia's full-scale invasion; screened at the Council of Europe, the European Parliament, U.S. universities and the Ukrainian Museum in New York City.
- Poland from Afar (2023) – co-director and scriptwriter. Documentary showcasing the geopolitical changes in Central Europe following Russia's full-scale invasion of Ukraine, with a special focus on Poland's role in shaping the new regional order
- Ukraine: Report from a Crime Scene (Ukraina. Raport z miejsca zbrodni) (2022) – director and screenwriter. Documentary reportage on civilians affected by Russian attacks and occupation in Ukraine.
- Belarus: Awakening (Białoruś. Przebudzenie) (2022) – director and screenwriter. Documentary on the Belarusian protest movement and state repression.
- Domeyko. Born Under a Lucky Mineral (Urodzony pod szczęśliwym minerałem) (2022) – co-screenwriter and on-screen participant. Documentary on Polish geologist and explorer Ignacy Domeyko.
- Eastward (Kierunek Wschód) (2021–2023) – presenter and writer. Current-affairs and reportage series on political and security developments east of Poland.
- Tomek on the Borders of the Republic (Tomek na granicach Rzeczypospolitej) (2020–2021) – presenter and screenwriter. Television reportage series on the former borderlands of the Second Polish Republic.
- Lithuania: In the Shadow of the Tower (2021) – director and co-screenwriter. Documentary on Lithuania's restoration of independence and the January 1991 events in Vilnius.
- Split (Rozszczepieni) (2020) – co-director and co-screenwriter. Documentary on nuclear energy and communities living near nuclear facilities.
- Shadows of the Empire (2019) – co-screenwriter. Feature documentary about people living in post-Soviet conflict zones; screened at international festivals and at Georgetown University.
- The Long Walk 70 Years Later (2011) – producer and expedition participant. Documentary about the Long Walk Plus expedition across Eurasia.

== Expeditions ==
- 2010: Long Walk Plus Expedition – an expedition from Yakutsk in Siberia through the taiga, Buryatia, Mongolia, the Gobi Desert, China, Tibet, the Himalayas, Nepal and India to Kolkata, retracing the route described in Sławomir Rawicz's book The Long Walk, which recounts the alleged escape of a group of prisoners led by a Pole from a Soviet Gulag in 1941. Participants: Tomasz Grzywaczewski, Bartosz Malinowski and Filip Drożdż. Distance: more than 8,000 km.
- 2012: Poland Trek powered by Żegluga Wiślana – an expedition covering the entire length of the Vistula River, from Zakopane to the Baltic Sea, on foot, by raft and by kayak. Participants: Tomasz Grzywaczewski and Louis-Philippe Loncke. Distance: 1,200 km.
- 2013: Martwa Droga – Dead Road – an expedition to locate and explore Gulag camps along one of the most inaccessible sections of the abandoned Transpolar Mainline, also known as the Dead Road. Participants: Tomasz Grzywaczewski, Maciej Cypryk, Ania Hyman, Łukasz Orlicki and Marek Kozakiewicz. Distance: more than 1,500 km.
- 2016: Expédition Africaine Rogoziński "Vivat Polonia 2016" – an expedition to Africa (Cameroon, Nigeria, Liberia and Ivory Coast) following in the footsteps of Stefan Szolc-Rogoziński, the Polish explorer of Cameroon. Participants included Tomasz Grzywaczewski, Maciej Klósak, Władysław Rybiński and Dariusz Skonieczko, as well as a delegation from the State Ethnographic Museum in Warsaw led by its director, Adam Czyżewski.
- 2015–2017: Unrecognized States – a series of journeys through post-Soviet unrecognized and partially recognized territories, from Transnistria and the Donbas front line, through Abkhazia and the borderlands of South Ossetia, to Nagorno-Karabakh.
- 2019–2021: The Erased Border – a series of reporting journeys following the former borders of the Second Polish Republic through Kashubia, Silesia, Trans-Olza, the Bieszczady Mountains, Hutsulshchyna, Volhynia, Polesia, the area around Minsk, Latgale, the Vilnius Region, Masuria and the Vistula Delta.

== Awards and distinctions ==
- 2024 – Kazimierz Dziewanowski 2nd Prize of the Polish Journalists Association, funded by the Polish Press Agency, for international television reporting.
- 2023 – Kazimierz Dziewanowski Prize of the Polish Journalists Association, funded by the Polish Press Agency, for international television reporting.
- 2022 – Identitas Award for The Erased Border: In the Footsteps of the Second Polish Republic.
- 2022 – Platinum Ryngraf at the second "Memory and Identity" National Culture Festival for his work as a war correspondent in Ukraine.
- 2021 – Silver BohaterON Award and the Golden BohaterON Audience Award in the journalist category for The Erased Border reporting project.
- 2019 – Magellan Award for Borders of Dreams: On Unrecognized States and the audience prize of the Kryształowa Karta Polskiego Reportażu.
- 2019 – Creative Scholarship of the Polish Minister of Culture and National Heritage in the literature category.[6]
- 2016 – The Vivat Polonia 2016 expedition, in which he participated, was distinguished with The Explorers Club Flag No. 112.
- 2012 – Magellan Award for Across the Wild East.
- 2011 – "Czwarty Żywioł" Audience Award at the Three Elements Travelers' Festival for the Long Walk Plus Expedition, shared with Bartosz Malinowski and Filip Drożdż.
