= Oryx (website) =

OSINT defence analysis website

- Logo of Oryx
- Website type: Investigative journalism
- Available in: English (primary); Turkish; Japanese; Afrikaans
- Founded: November 2013
- Country of origin: Netherlands
- Founders: Stijn Mitzer, Joost Oliemans
- Website: oryxspioenkop.com

Oryx, or Oryxspioenkop, is a Dutch open-source intelligence defence analysis website and warfare research group. According to Oryx, the term spionkop (Afrikaans for "spy hill") "refers to a place from where one can watch events unfold around the world".

Oryx was created by Stijn Mitzer and Joost Oliemans, who have also written two books on the Korean People's Army. Both have previously worked for Netherlands-based Bellingcat. Oliemans also worked for Janes Information Services, a British open-source military intelligence company. After Stijn Mitzer and Joost Oliemans retired from the Oryx Blog, long-time contributor Jakub Janovsky took over as the site administrator.

== History ==
Oryx was started in 2013 and initially focused on Syria and later on the Second Nagorno-Karabakh War.

The blog gained international prominence through its work during the 2022 Russian invasion of Ukraine, counting and keeping track of material losses based on visual evidence and open-source intelligence from social media. It has been regularly cited in major media, including Reuters, BBC News, The Guardian, The Economist, Newsweek, CNN, and CBS News. Forbes has called Oryx "the most reliable source in the conflict so far", calling its services "outstanding". Because it reports only visually confirmed losses, Forbes claimed that Oryx's tallies of equipment losses have formed absolute minimum baselines for loss estimates.

In June 2023, former General David Petraeus commended Oryx: "In today's day and age of open source media and intelligence, there is a website that actually tracks absolutely confirmed, verified destruction of, say, tanks and infantry fighting vehicles. (...) This is confirmed by photograph[s], with metadata, so that you make sure you don't double-count, etc."

On 19 June 2023, Oryx announced that the blog would end on 1 October 2023. In the statement posted on Twitter, Oryx explained that the blog had been created a decade earlier "out of boredom", and that the project – which had been conducted "in our free time" and without any pay – had turned into an "all-consuming project" that had not resulted in any jobs and which "just doesn't make me happy anymore". In a follow-up statement, Oryx clarified that the list covering losses in Russia's invasion of Ukraine would continue to be updated until the end of the war by long-time contributor Jakub Janovsky and the open-source intelligence group WarSpotting.

== Reception ==
On 11 July 2022, the Warsaw Institute stated that, "The data from Oryx is regarded as one of the most accurate sources, however, there are concerns that there is a pro-Ukrainian bias as there might be more photos published about Russian destroyed equipment."

== See also ==
- Institute for the Study of War
