= Raszków (disambiguation) =

Raszków is a town in Greater Poland Voivodeship (west-central Poland).

Raszków may also refer to:

- Raszków, Lower Silesian Voivodeship (south-west Poland)
- Raszków, Świętokrzyskie Voivodeship (south-central Poland)

== See also ==
- Rașcov
- Rashkov
- Raszów (disambiguation)
