= Poles in Moldova =

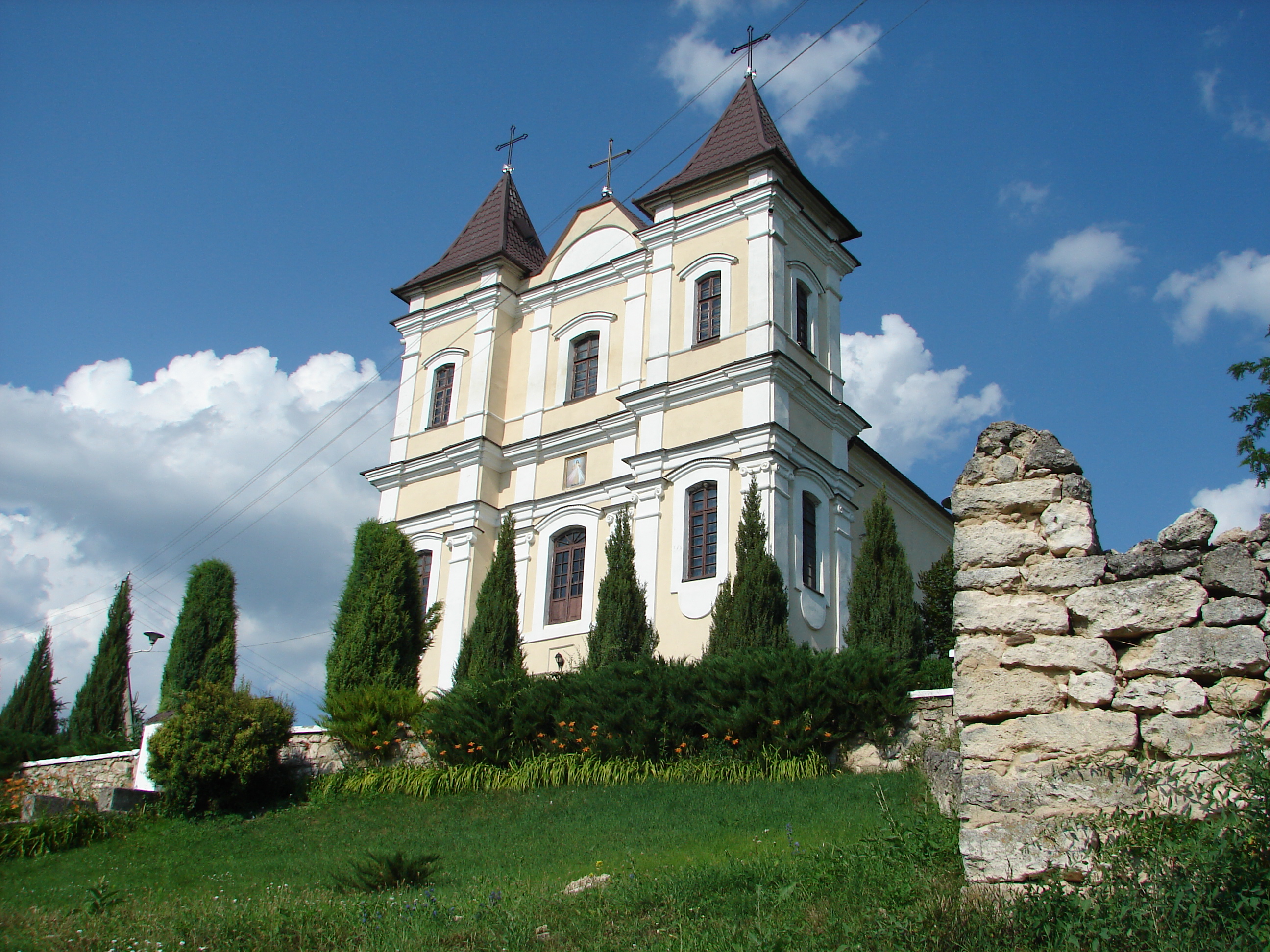
- Polish Saint Cajetan Church in Rașcov

Total population
- 4,174 (2004)

Regions with significant populations
- Bălţi, Chişinău, Rîbnița District, Camenca District, Tiraspol

Languages
- Polish, Romanian, Russian

Related ethnic groups
- Polish diaspora

The history of Poles in Moldova has to be examined keeping in mind the traditional borderline along the Dniester river which separates Bessarabia from Transnistria in Moldova. While the regions on both sides of the river were socially and culturally interconnected, the distinct political histories of the two territories resulted in different patterns of Polish settlement there.

== History ==
=== Bessarabia ===
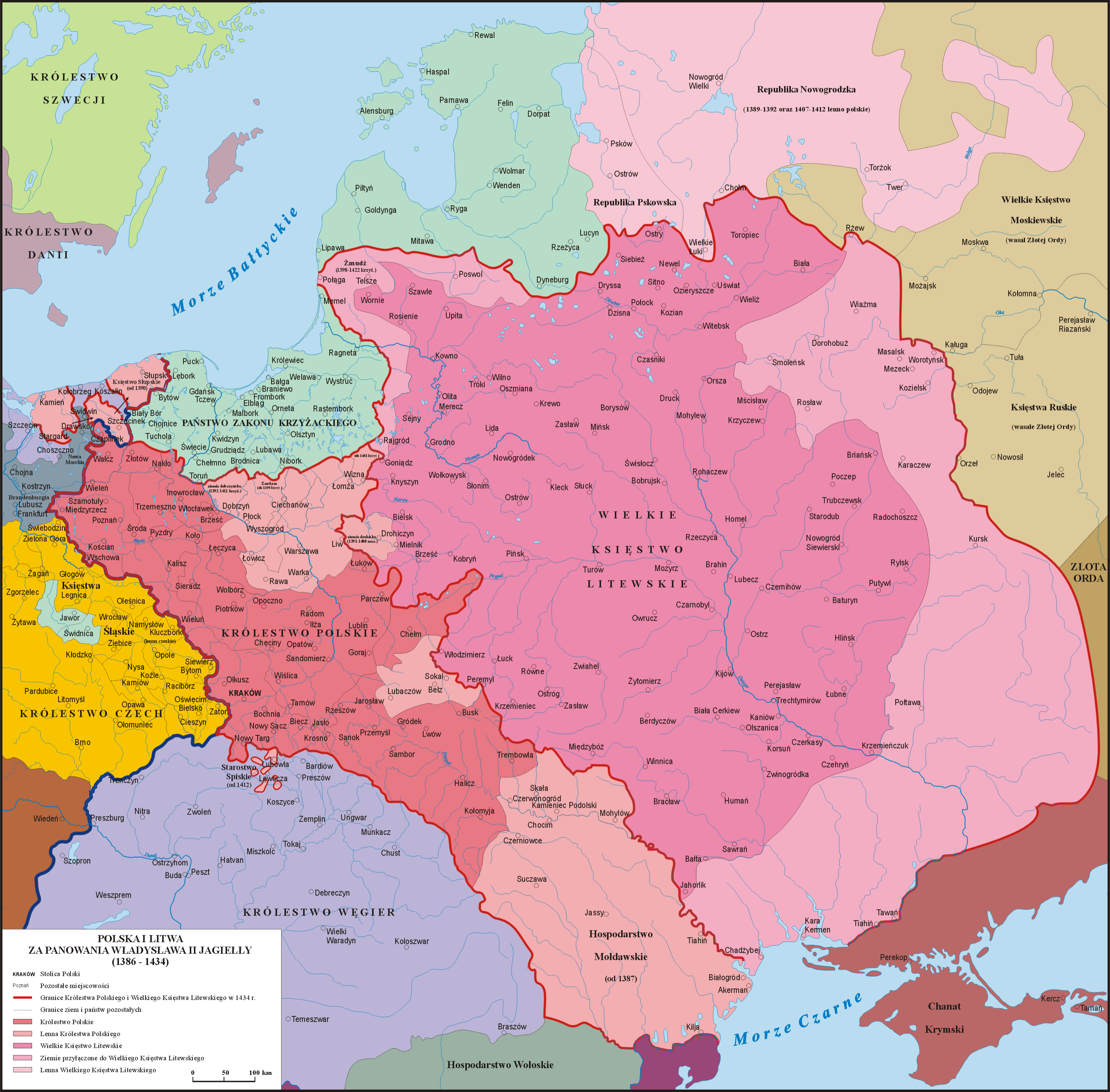
Map of the Kingdom of Poland and the Grand Duchy of Lithuania between 1386 and 1434 showing the Principality of Moldavia as a Polish fief.

The beginnings of Polish influence in Bessarabia can be traced back to the 14th century with the founding of the Principality of Moldavia. Trade between the Baltic and Black Seas between the two neighboring countries facilitated their growing bond. During this era Moldavia was a vassal state of first the Kingdom of Poland and later the Polish–Lithuanian Commonwealth several times Although the border along the Dniester river was socially porous, with substantial intermarriage and cultural exchange between the Moldavian nobility with Polish szlachta and Ukrainian elites, there was an absence of significant Polish settlement in Moldavia at that time.

==== Catholic missionary activity from Poland ====
This connection to Poland was compounded by the attempts to bring Moldavia into the Roman Catholic Church which predate the principality's founding. Franciscan and Dominican missionaries created several Latin Catholic communities in present-day Romania starting in the 13th century CE. The Holy See decided to created bishoprics, south and east of the Carpathian Mountains in Wallachia and Moldavia. Catholicism was attractive among the traditionally Orthodox population due to the political late 14th century context, as the Ottoman Empire advanced into Europe. With Constantinople encircled to a large degree after the conquest of (H)Adrianopolis, (now Edirne), in 1360, the Byzantine emperors sought a political and hopefully military ally in the Catholic west, which had crusaded against Islam to and in the Middle East before. Bogdan I followed the same example, and thanks to it obtained virtual independence in 1359 as the founding voivode (autonomous prince) of Moldavia. Seeking aid and protection from Poland, Bogdan welcomed the Latin missionaries. A Franciscan monastery was founded at Siret in 1340 and the Diocese of Siret followed in 1371.

The diocese came to fruition after Bogdan's son Lațcu of Moldavia (1365-1373) invited a delegation from Rome, promising his and his subject's conversion to Catholicism and asked Pope Urban V to send missionaries and erect a Latin diocese in his principality's capital, Siret. On 24 July 1370 the Pope instructed the archbishop of Prague and bishops of Bratislava and Kraków (Cracovia) to verify/complete the sincerity of Laţcu (although his wife remained Orthodox) and mandated them to erect such diocese covering the Moldavian state. After Pope Gregory XI established the diocese, Polish Franciscan Andrzej Jastrzebiec was consecrated first Bishop by archbishop Florian Mokrski of Cracow. The cathedral, dedicated to John the Baptist, was built by queen Margareth, Catholic kin of the Hungarian royal family, which in 1377 had invited Dominicans to Siret.

However prince Laţcu favoring of Catholicism met grave opposition from the Orthodox clergy, while effective Latin converts were concentrated in the north of Moldavia, near Catholic neighbour kingdoms Poland and Hungary. Since 1372, when Andrzej was nominated Apostolic administrator of the Archdiocese of Halyč, probably never returning to Siret, he and his (all Polish) successors resided more in Poland then in Moldavia. In 1388 prince Petru (Peter) II "Muşat" (1375–1391) transferred the Moldavian voivode's capital from Siret to Suceava, thus contributing to the crisis in the diocese of Siret, now abandoned by both crown and episcopate.

==== Polish influence ====
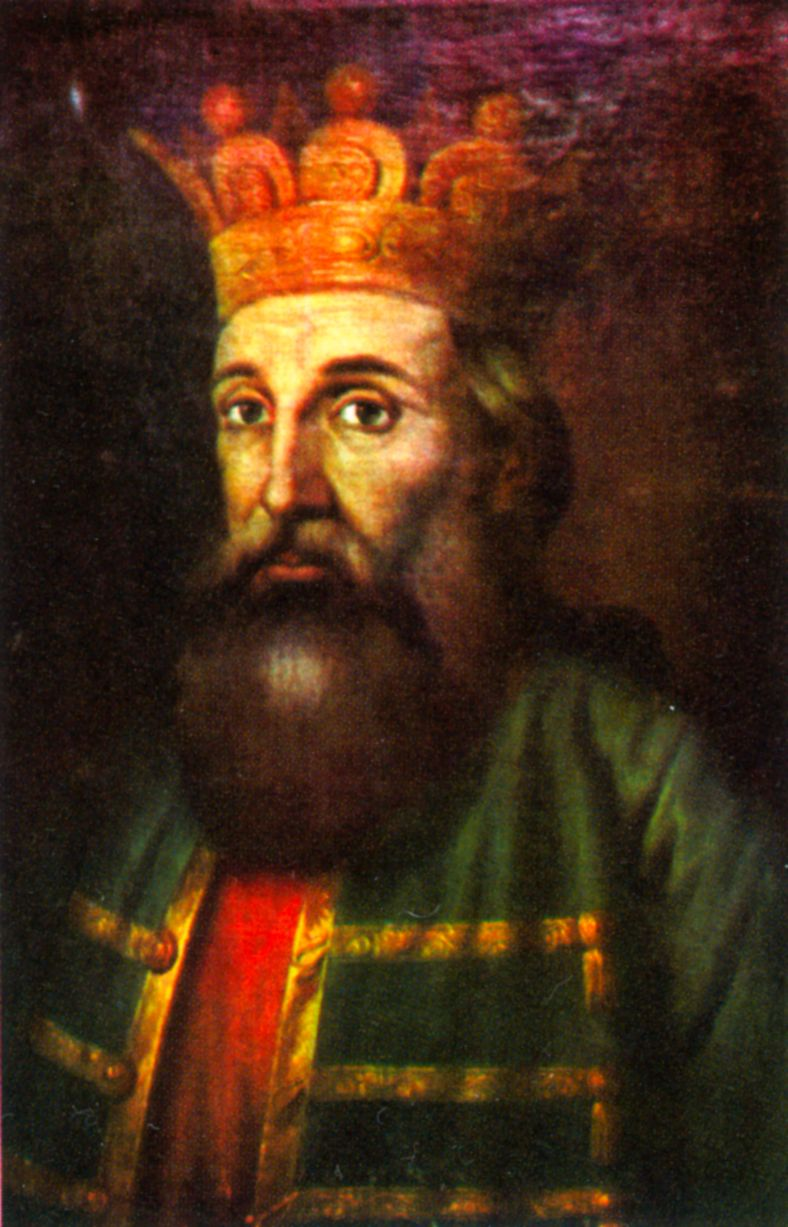
Prince Petru made maintaining a good relationship with Poland a priority. On 27 September 1387 at Lwów, he paid homage to the Polish king Władysław II Jagiełło, making Moldavia a Polish fief which it remained until 1497.

Despite thwarting the nascent Roman Catholic Church in Moldavia, Petru made maintaining a good relationship with Poland a priority. On 27 September 1387 at Lwów, he paid homage to the Polish king Władysław II Jagiełło, making Moldavia a Polish fief (which it remained until 1497). Petru's second marriage in 1388 was to Olga, daughter of Janusz I, Prince of Masovia with whom he had a son, Ivașcu. Even after the influence of the Ottoman Empire grew in Moldavia and the Balkans, Poles continued to be very involved in the affairs of its neighbor until the Polish Partitions end in 1795.

==== Bessarabia ====
At the same time, Moldavia was, in turn, to be forcibly divided, through the annexation of Moldovan territories by the Habsburg monarchy in 1774 (the northwestern part of Moldavia, renamed Bukovina), and by the Russian Empire in 1812 (the eastern half of Moldavia, renamed Bessarabia).

Several waves of political and economic migration brought Poles to start settling in Bessarabia beginning in the 18th century. These included fugitive serfs, the defeated forces of the dethroned Polish King Stanisław Leszczyński's march to Bendery, and later defeated insurgents of the Kościuszko Uprising all looking for shelter across the border from Poland. The chaos surrounding the Partitions of Poland also contributed to this process. Polish migration into this area later increased after Bessarabia's incorporation into the Russian Empire, which included substantial numbers of Jews from Poland.

Over the 19th century, the Russian authorities encouraged the colonization of Bessarabia by Romanians, Russians, Ukrainians, Germans, Bulgarians, Poles, and Gagauzes, primarily in the northern and southern areas vacated by Turks and Nogai Tatar, the latter having been expelled in the 1770s and 1780s, during Russo-Turkish Wars; the inclusion of the province in the Pale of Settlement also allowed the immigration of more Jews. (Note: The Jewish minority was more numerous in the past (228,620 Jews in Bessarabia in 1897, or 11.8% of the population).) The Romanian proportion of the population decreased from an estimated 86% in 1816, to around 52% in 1905. During this time there were anti-Semitic riots, leading to an exodus of thousands of Jews to the United States.

=== Transnistria ===
Map illustrating the location of Bracław Voivodeship in the Polish–Lithuanian Commonwealth.

There is a lack of clarity as to whether Transnistria was part of Kievan Rus' beginning in the 11th century, and if so, to what degree. After the disintegration of Kievan Rus' because of the Mongol Invasions, this area came under the rule of the Grand Duchy of Lithuania in the 15th century as part of Podolia. Much of Transnistria remained a part of Bracław Voivodeship in the Polish–Lithuanian Commonwealth until the Second Partition of Poland in 1793.

In 1504 the Crimean Khanate conquered the southernmost portion of Transnistria south of the Iagorlîc/Jagorlyk river along with the rest of the Yedisan region which remained under the control of the Ottoman Empire until 1792. Thus the border between the two states was set on the Iagorlîc river, referred to as the Iahurlîc in Moldavian chronicles, and in Polish source as Jahorlik or Jahorłyk

==== Polish colonization ====
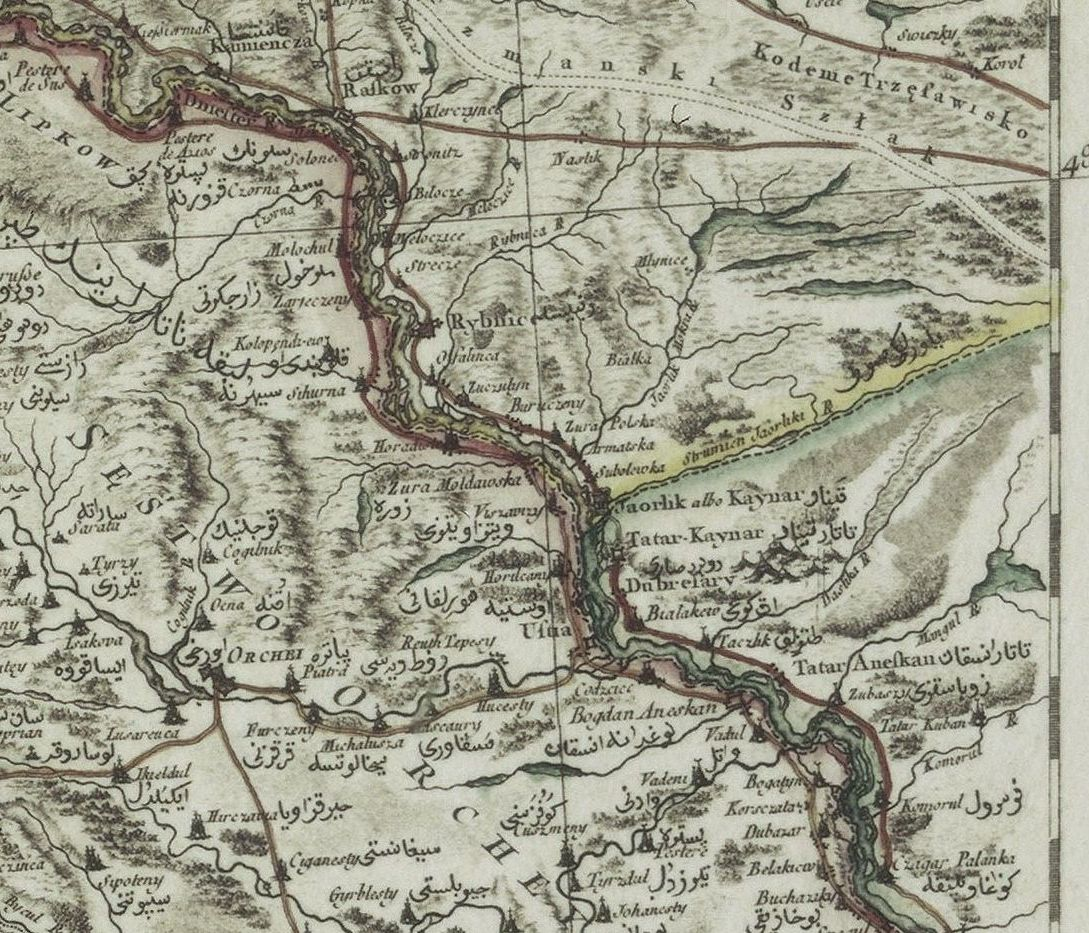
Map from 1772 CE illustrating settlements along the border between Bracław Voivodeship in the Polish–Lithuanian Commonwealth, the Crimean Khanate, and the Principality of Moldavia.

Because of the massive slave raids and invasions launched by the Crimean Khanate, much of the southern region of the Polish–Lithuanian Commonwealth was sparsely populated. To remedy this, the 16th and 17th centuries Polish kings, in particular Stephen Báthory and Sigismund III Vasa, sponsored large-scale Polish colonization of Podolia, which includes the territories of modern Transnistria. Polish magnates were given large tracts of sparsely settled lands, while Polish petty gentry managed the estates and served as soldiers. Serfs were enticed to move into these territories by a temporary 20 year exemption from serfdom. Although most serfs were from western Ukrainian lands, a significant number of Polish serfs from central Poland also settled these estates. The latter tended to assimilate into Ukrainian society and some of them even took part in the Cossack uprisings against the landlords. Polish magnates from Ukraine played a significant political and social role within the Polish–Lithuanian Commonwealth, as did the native nobility in these areas which Polonized over time.

Polish rule at this time involved the expansion of Jesuit schools and large scale construction of ornate castles and estates that included libraries, art collections, and archives that in many cases were the equal in importance to those in Poland itself. By the late 18th century, approximately 11% of the population were Roman Catholics, most of them Poles.

==== Incorporation into the Russian Empire ====
At the time of the Partition of Poland, approximately ten percent of the population of all of the territories annexed by Russia were ethnically Polish. Poles included wealthy magnates with large estates, poorer nobles who worked as administrators or soldiers, and peasants. Long after this region ceased being a part of Poland, Poles continued to play an important role in both the province and in the city of Kiev. Until the failed Polish insurrection of 1830–1831, Polish continued to be the administrative language in education, government and the courts.

Under the Russian Empire, Polish society tended to stratify. The Polish magnates prospered under the Russian Empire, at the expense of the serfs and of the poorer Polish nobility whom they pushed from the land. The wealthy magnates tended to oppose the Polish insurrections, identified with their Russian landlord peers, and often moved to St. Petersburg. The Polish national movement in Ukrainian lands thus tended to be led by members of the middle and poorer gentry, who formed secret societies in places with large Polish populations. As a result of an anti-Russian insurrection in 1830, the Polish middle and poorer nobility were stripped of their legal noble status by the Russian government, and Russification policies were enacted. These Polish nobles, legally reduced to the status of peasants, often assimilated into the Ukrainian language and culture. Many of the poorer Polish nobles who became Ukrainianized in language, culture and political loyalty constituted an important element of the growing Ukrainian national movement. In spite of the ongoing migration of Poles from central Poland into Ukrainian lands, by the end of the nineteenth century only three percent of the total population of these territories reported that Polish was their first language.

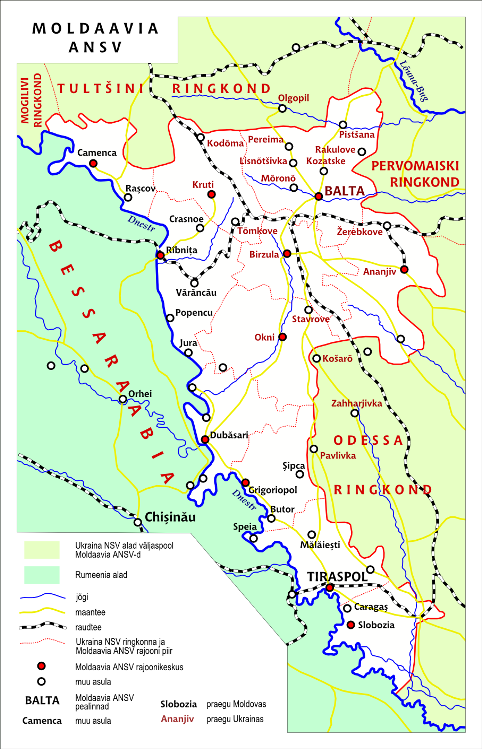
The map of the Moldavian ASSR

==== Under Soviet rule ====
After World War I, the advance of the Bolshevik armies, the Polish–Soviet War of 1919–1921, and the incorporation of these lands into the USSR, there was a massive exodus of Poles, particularly landowners and intelligentsia, from the former Russian Partition into Poland.

The area that would become Transnistria was organized into the Ukrainian SSR in 1919, under which the Moldavian Autonomous Soviet Socialist Republic (MASSR) was created in 1924. Under Stalinist rule, the Polish community would decline further. After a brief initial period of liberalization and freedom towards Poles in the Soviet Union were subject to harassment, dispersal and mass terror. This trend increased in the late 1930s, as a result of the 1937-8 Polish Operation of the NKVD as well as the ceasing of educational instruction in the Moldavian ASSR for all non-Romanians populations in their native languages which was replaced by Ukrainian and Russian.

=== Unification of Bessarabian and Transnistrian territories ===
On August 2, 1940, the Soviet Union established the Moldavian Soviet Socialist Republic (Moldavian SSR), which consisted of six counties of Bessarabia joined with the westernmost part of what had been the MASSR, effectively dissolving it. From this point forward until the beginning of the Transnistria War in 1990 and the establishment of a breakaway state, the Polish Community in Moldova was under one polity.

==== After World War II until the collapse of the USSR ====
The number of Poles in all of the regions within the former Soviet Union has been steadily decreasing over the past century. To a large extent this decline can be traced due to policies of Sovietization which aimed to destroy Polish culture in the USSR. Knowledge about the Polish Community in Moldova was completely absent in Poland throughout the entire postward period until the collapse of the USSR. This trend was only reversed in the 1990s when Polish researchers gained the ability to conduct research in Moldova.

=== Present ===
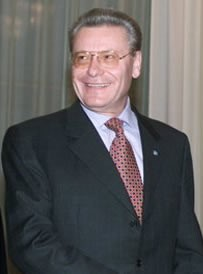
Petru Lucinschi served as the second President of Moldova and carries a transcribed version of the Polish surname Łuczyński.

According to the 1989 Soviet Census, there were 4,739 Poles in the Moldavian SSR. The Moldovan Census of 2004 reported 2,383 Poles. The latter census did not include data collected in Transnistria, and the 2004 Census in Transnistria reported 2% of the population (about 1,100) to be Poles.

Some publications of Polonia activists and Polish diplomats mention numbers of up to 20,000 of Poles in Moldova, — numbers significantly exceeding that of self-identified Poles in the census. Some authors include in their estimates people of Polish descent, while others assume people of Catholic faith (in a predominantly Eastern Orthodox country) are most probably of Polish descent; and this may include, e.g. Ukrainians with ties to Poland in their ancestry.

As a consequence of the Russian and Soviet policies towards Polish culture, only a small percentage of Poles in Moldova today speak Polish. For example, Petru Lucinschi, who served as the second President of Moldova carries a transcribed version of the Polish surname Łuczyński, but has never publicly identified with a Polish heritage. Some Transnistrian politicians such as former First Lady Nina Shtanski and Yevgeni Zubov are open about their Polish roots.

On May 16–17, 1995 an international symposium was held about Poles in Moldova. Just before the conference a book Polacy w Mołdowie mówią o sobie was published, which is a collection of memoirs of people who lived through the Soviet times in Moldavian SSR or still live in Moldova. The materials of the conference were published under the title Polacy w Mołdawii

== Polish organizations in Moldova ==
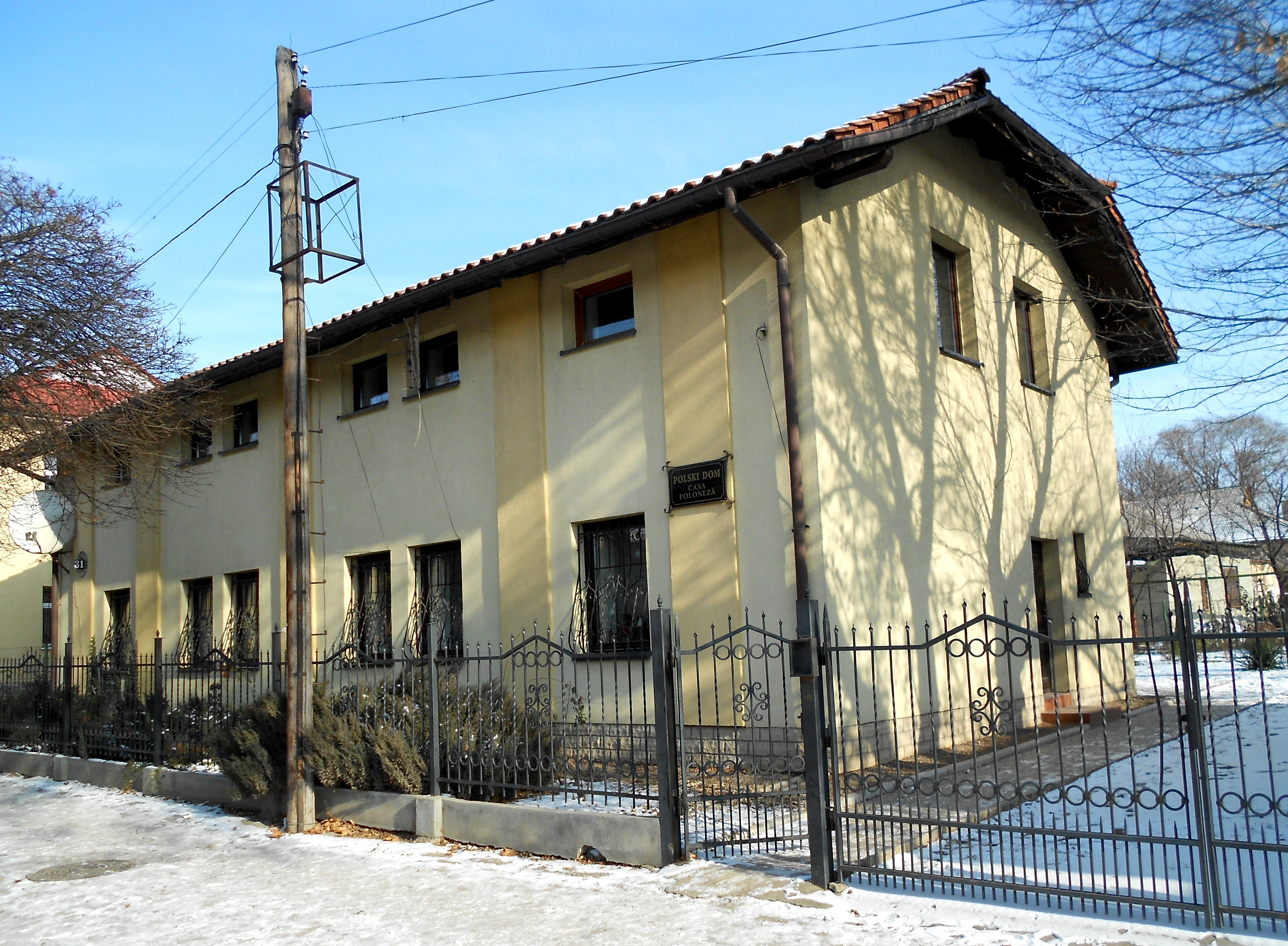
The Polish House in Bălți

In the period of the collapse of the Soviet Union, in 1990 professor Tadeusz Malinowski established the Polish Cultural Association (Polskie Stowarzyszenie Kulturalne) in Kishinev. Unfortunately due to various difficulties it was not successful. However, on its base other Polish organizations were created: the Union of Poles in Moldova and the Society of Poles "Revival" (Towarzystwo Polaków "Odrodzenie"). Later many other Polish organizations were founded, in the opinion of J. Derlicki, too many for the small Polish population. As of 2013, the following organizations are active:

- Stowarzyszenie Polska Wiosna w Mołdawii
- Polskie Towarzystwo Medyczne w Mołdawii - Polish Medical Association in Moldova
- Związek Polaków w Mołdawii - Union of Poles in Moldova
- Stowarzyszenie Polaków Gagauzji - Association of Poles in Gagauzia; over 200 members as of 2013
- Stowarzyszenie Kultury Polskiej "Jasna Góra" - "Jasna Góra" Association of Polish Culture, Tiraspol, Transnistria
- Stowarzyszenie "Liga Polskich Kobiet w Moldawii" "The League of Polish Women in Moldova"

== See also ==
- Moldova–Poland relations
- Poles in Romania
- Poles in Ukraine
- Polish vassalization of Moldavia (1387)
- Moldovans in Poland
