= Moldova–Poland relations =

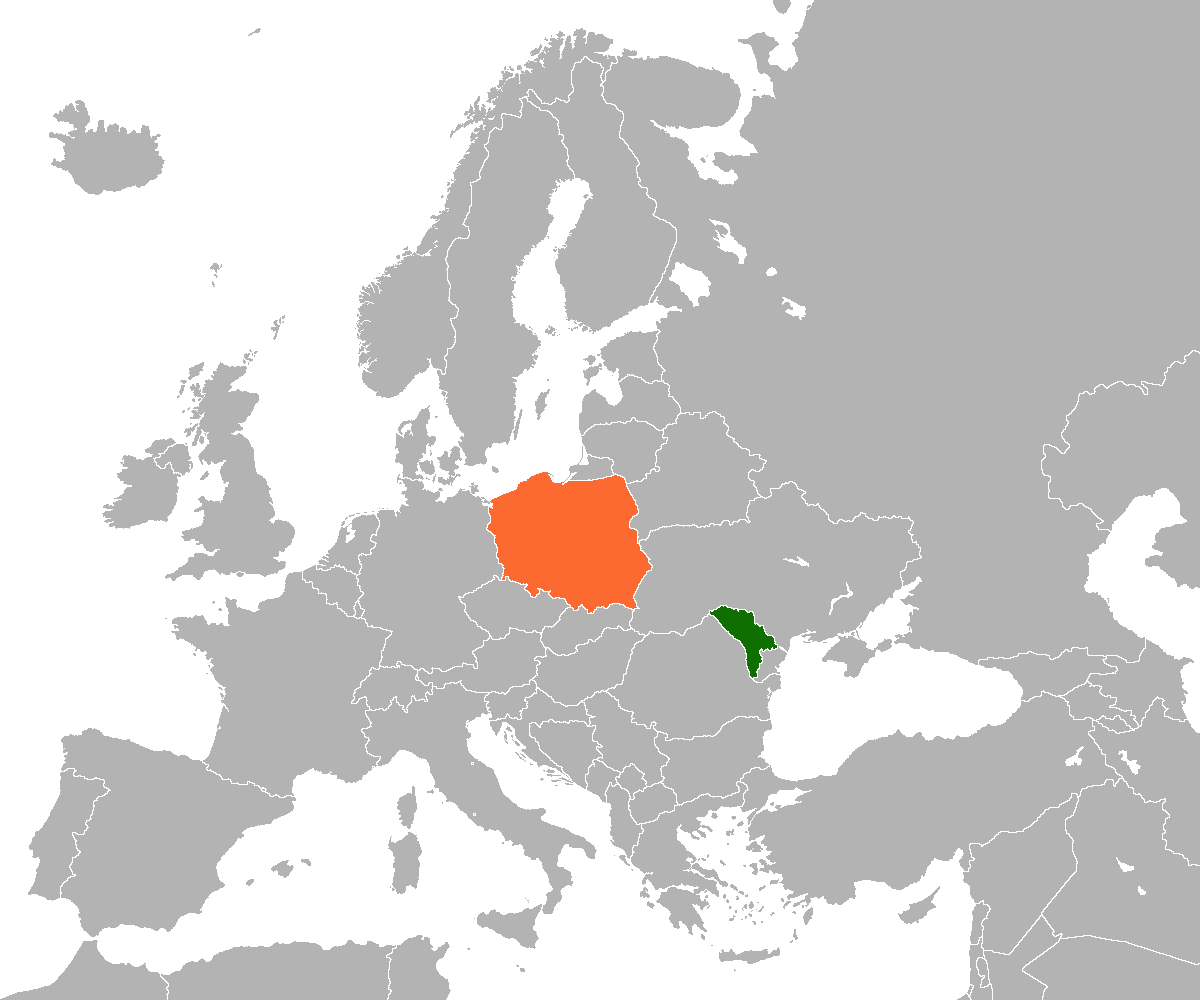

- Moldova: Poland

Moldova–Poland relations refers to the relationship between Moldova and Poland. The two countries established relations following the independence of Moldova at 1991. Poland is a member of the EU, which Moldova applied for in 2022. Both countries are full members of the Council of Europe. Also Moldova is an EU candidate and Poland is an EU member. Poland fully supports Moldova's bid to join the EU.

== History ==
Historically, the Principality of Moldavia was a vassal of the Kingdom of Poland and later, Polish–Lithuanian Commonwealth. Due to this, a small but active Polish community existed in Moldova. Both were later occupied by the Russian Empire and the Soviet Union at various times.

=== Polish Community in Moldova ===
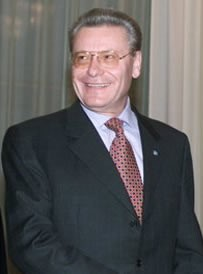
Petru Lucinschi served as the second President of Moldova and carries a transcribed version of the Polish surname Łuczyński.

According to the 1989 Soviet Census, there were 4,739 Poles in the Moldavian SSR. The Moldovan Census of 2004 reported 2,383 Poles. The latter census did not include data collected in Transnistria, which for centuries was within the boundaries of the Polish–Lithuanian Commonwealth and was subject to significant Polish colonisation. The 2004 Census in Transnistria reported 2% of the population (about 1,100) to be Poles.

Some publications of Polonia activists and Polish diplomats mention numbers of more than 20,000 Poles in Moldova, — numbers significantly exceeding that of self-identified Poles in the census. Some authors include in their estimates people of Polish descent, while others assume people of Catholic faith (in a predominantly Eastern Orthodox country) are most probably of Polish descent; and this may include, e.g. Ukrainians with ties to Poland in their ancestry.

As a consequence of the Russian and Soviet policies towards Polish culture, only a small percentage of Poles in Moldova today speak Polish. For example, Petru Lucinschi, who served as the second President of Moldova carries a transcribed version of the Polish surname Łuczyński, but has never publicly identified with a Polish heritage. A number of Transnistrian politicians such as former First Lady Nina Shtanski and Yevgeni Zubov, however, are open about their Polish roots.

=== Modern relations ===
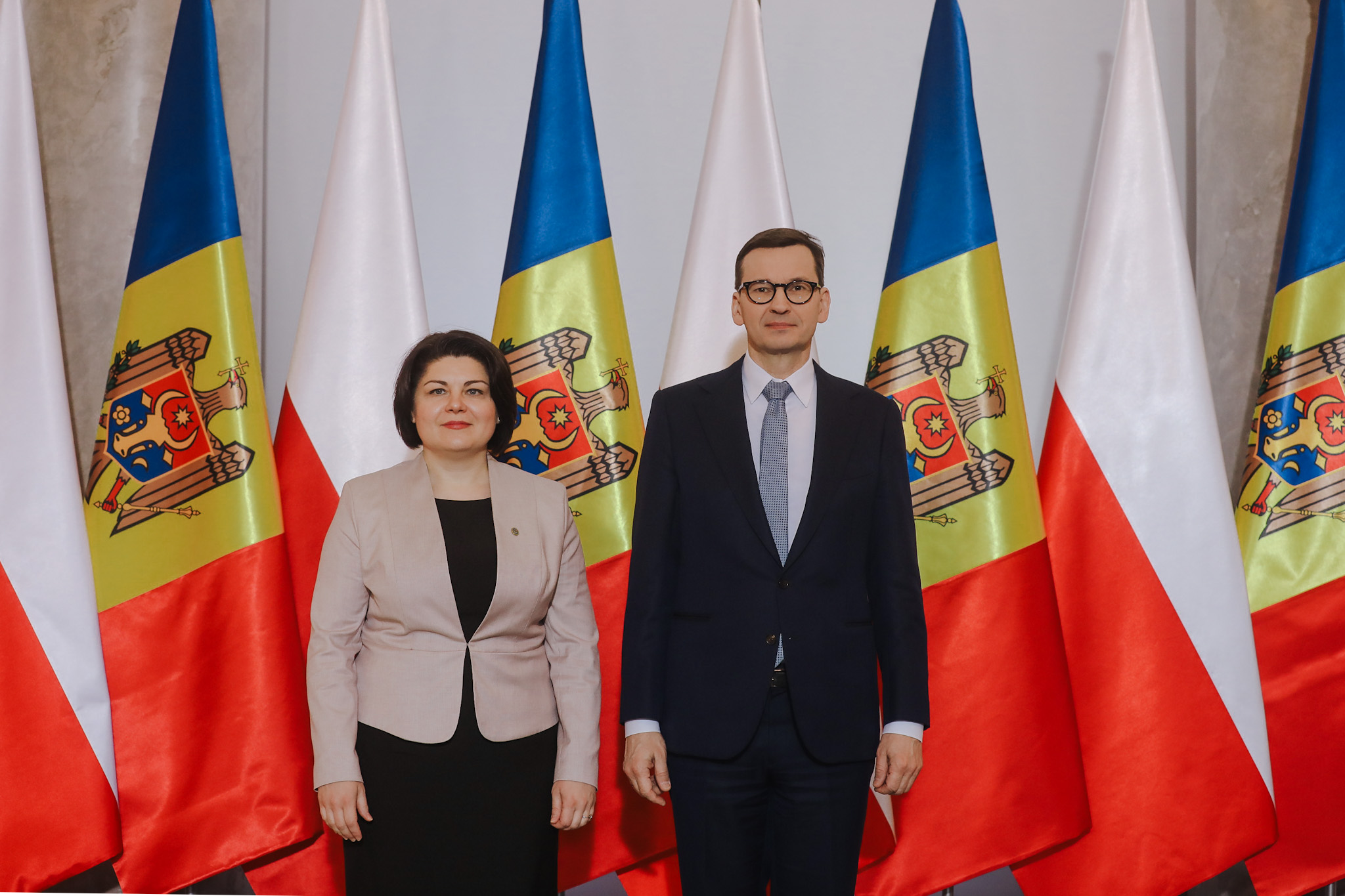
Moldovan Prime Minister Natalia Gavrilița meets with Polish Prime Minister Mateusz Morawiecki in Warsaw, 8 April 2022

Poland has always been a vocal supporter for Moldova's integration and membership to the European Union, which Poland is a member of. Poland has been well-aware with political marginalisation of Moldova with the situation of Transnistria and Poland has officially announced it won't recognise Transnistria as a separate nation.

Poland is one of Moldova's ten main trading partners. In 2019, Poland was the eighth largest source of imports and the sixth largest export destination for Moldova.

In 2020, following the outbreak of the COVID-19 pandemic in Moldova, Poland donated medical aid and equipment, incl. oxygen concentrators, to various hospitals in Moldova, also via the Polish community in Moldova.

In October 2021, during a gas crisis, Moldova purchased one million cubic meters of natural gas from Poland. This was Moldova's first gas purchase from a country other than Russia.

The Warsaw Institute, a Polish think tank, maintains a Romania Monitor to explain the main course of political, economical and social developments in Romania and Moldova.

== Resident diplomatic missions ==
- Moldova has an embassy in Warsaw.
- Poland has an embassy in Chișinău.
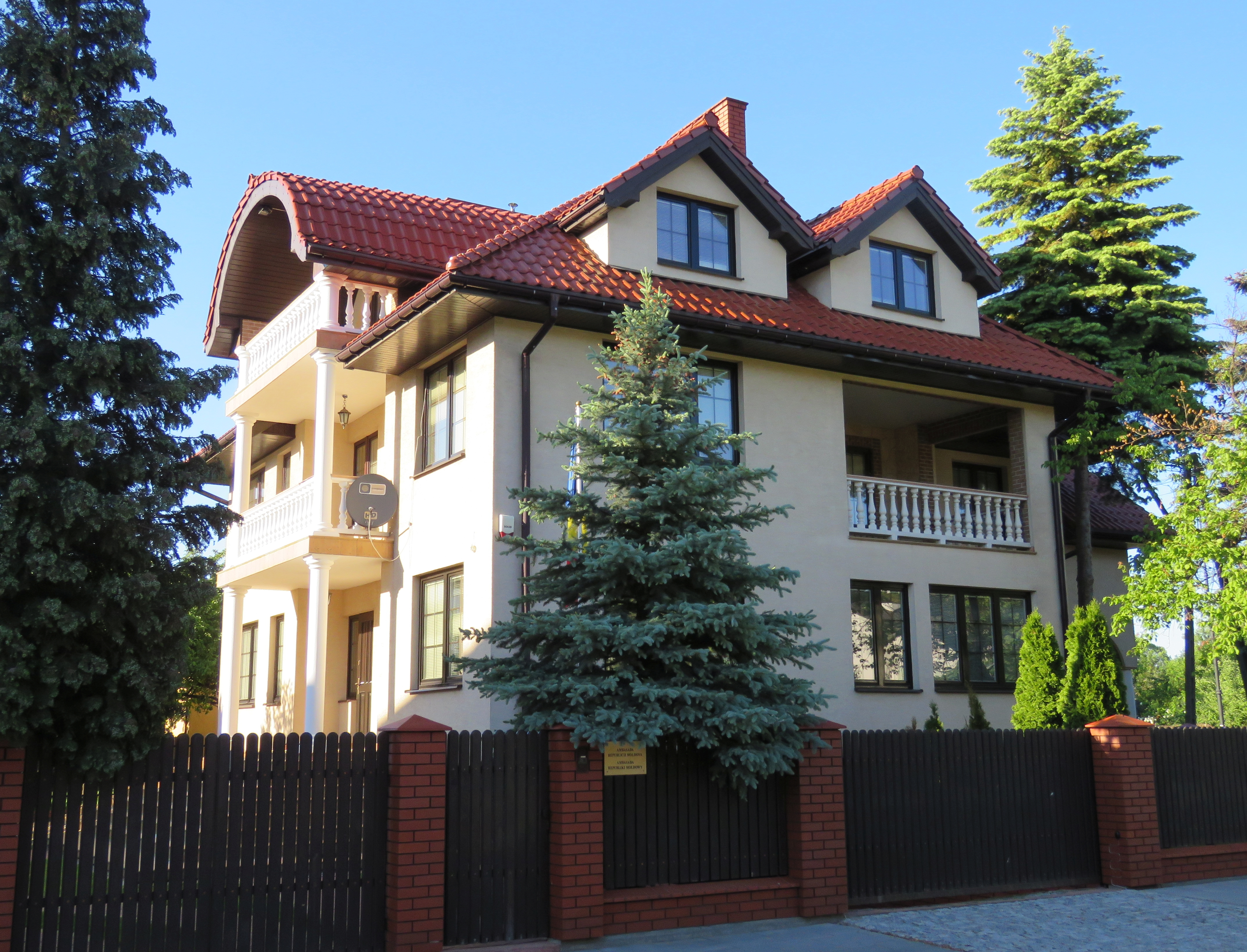
Embassy of Moldova in Warsaw

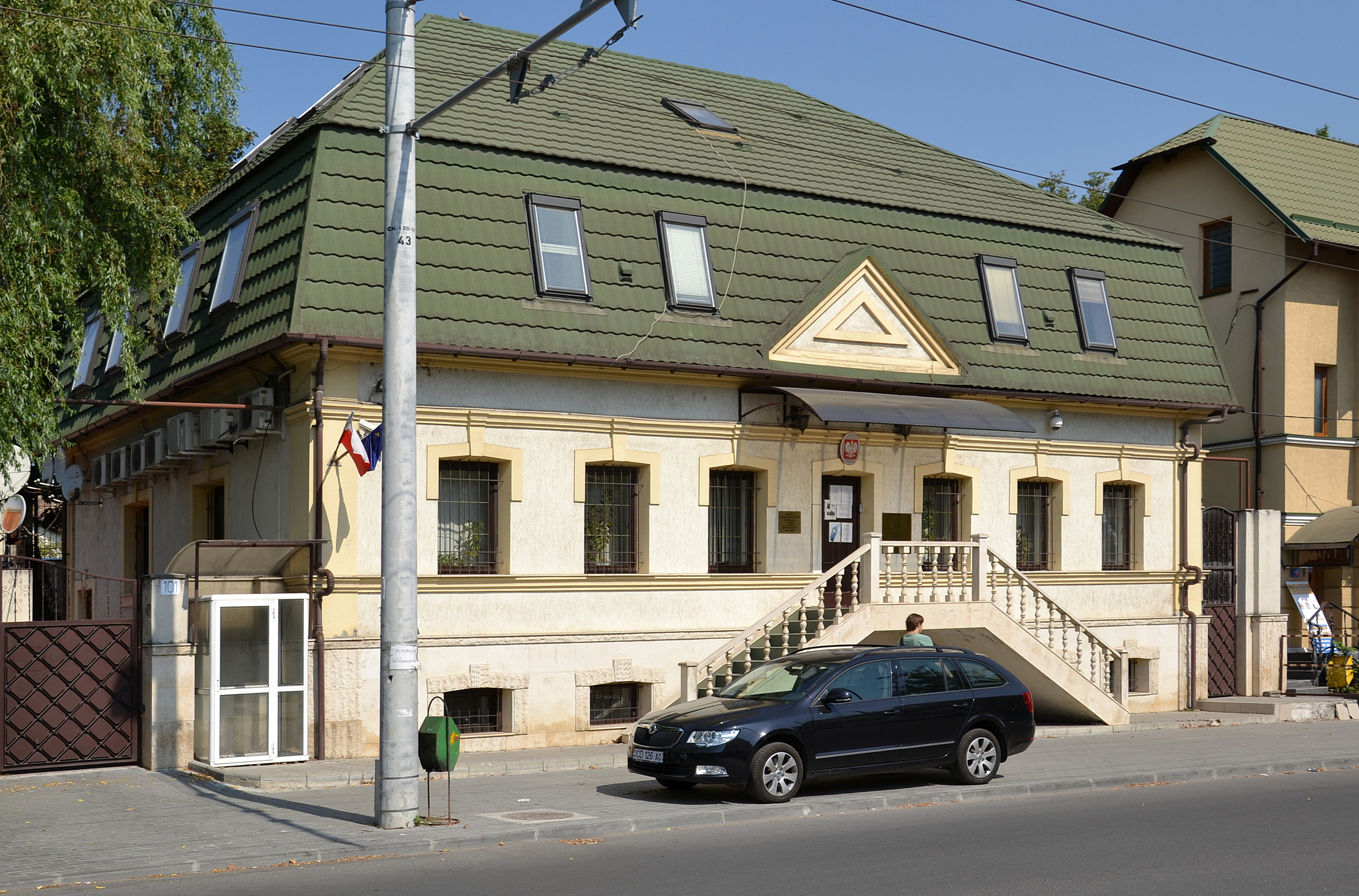
Embassy of Poland in Chișinău

== See also ==
- Foreign relations of Moldova
- Foreign relations of Poland
- Moldova-NATO relations
- Moldova–EU relations
  - Accession of Moldova to the EU
- Poles in Moldova
- Polish vassalization of Moldavia (1387)
