= Rashkov =

Rashkov (Bulgarian: Рашков) is a Bulgarian male surname, its feminine counterpart is Rashkova. It may refer to:

- Genko Rashkov (1920–1996), Bulgarian Olympic equestrian
- Radoslav Rashkov (born 1987), Bulgarian association football player
- Valentina Rashkova, Bulgarian artistic gymnast

== See also ==
- Rașcov
- Raszków
