= Polish vassalization of Moldavia (1387) =

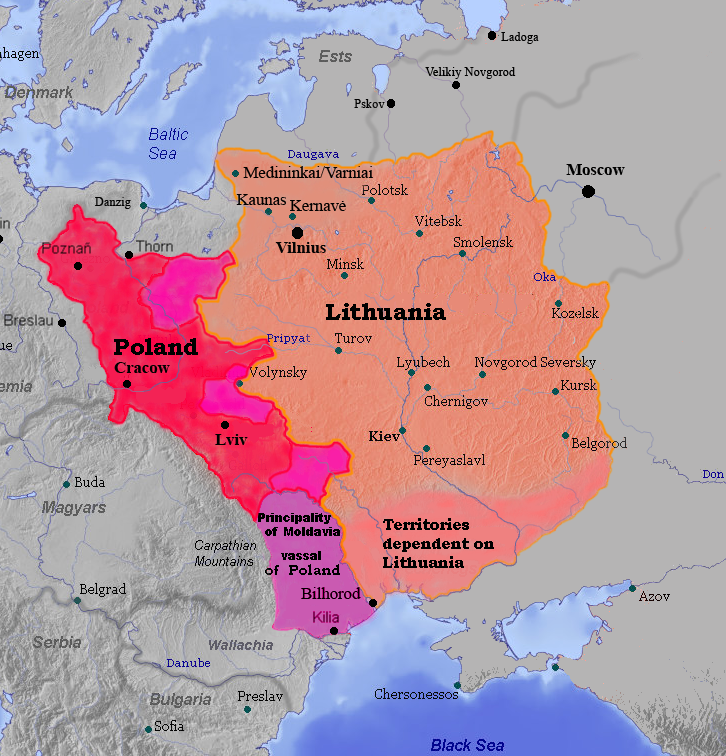
- Poland, Lithuania and vassal states in 1387
Date	27 September 1387
Location	Red Ruthenia
Result	Polish victory
Territorial changes	Poland obtains access to the Black Sea; Moldavia remained Polish until 1497

Belligerents
Kingdom of Poland	Principality of Moldavia	Kingdom of Hungary

Commanders and leaders
Jadwiga of Poland Władysław II Jagiełło	Petru II of Moldavia	Mary of Hungary Vladislaus II of Opole

The Polish vassalization of Moldavia occurred on 26 September 1387 when Petru II of Moldavia paid homage to the King of Poland, Władysław II Jagiełło, at Lwów, making the Principality of Moldavia a vassal state of the Crown of the Kingdom of Poland.

== Background ==
From 1367 to 1387, the Principality of Moldavia remained under Hungarian suzerainty and under Polish-Hungarian suzerainty in the period between 1370 and 1382 when the Kingdom of Poland and the Kingdom of Hungary were united under one single monarch Louis I of Hungary. When Louis I was crowned King of Poland he also inherited the titular Kingdom of Galicia-Volhynia, which has been previously integrated into the Kingdom of Poland in 1349 and fully conquered by King Casimir III the Great in 1366, bringing Poland at the doorstep of Moldavia.

== Vassalization ==
Louis I died in 1382 without a male heir who would ensure the succession of his dynasty. However, in 1383 the Polish nobles decided to offer the crown to the youngest daughter of Louis, Princess Jadwiga, who was officially crowned King of Poland in 1384. The political turmoil in Poland following the death of Louis I persuaded the Grand Duke of Lithuania Jogaila to marry Jadwiga, and convert to Roman Catholicism, thus changing his name to Władysław Jagiełło and forming a union between the Kingdom of Poland and the Grand Duchy of Lithuania.

In 1387, Red Ruthenia still belonged to the Kingdom of Hungary, and Queen Jadwiga decided to launch a military expedition to reconquer the province in the same year and the Polish army, alongside a Lithuanian detachment led by Jagiełło, defeated the last point of Hungarian resistance at the fortress of Halicz on 11 August 1387. The following month, on 26 September 1387, while visiting Lwów in the newly reconquered province, Petru II paid homage and swore an oath of fealty to both Queen Jadwiga and King Władysław Jagiełło.

== Aftermath ==
The vassalization of Moldavia ensured that the Polish crown received access to the Black Sea through the port city of Maurocastrum in order to ensure the vitality of the commercial centre of Lwów and to ensure the protection of principal European trade routes. Hence, the vassalization provided Poland with a sphere of influence in Moldavia at the expense of the Kingdom of Hungary, while Moldavia obtained protection against Hungarian hegemony. Moldavia remained a Polish fief until 1497.

== See also ==
- Poles in Moldova
- Moldova–Poland relations
