= Rașcov =

Rașcov Рашково
- Commune
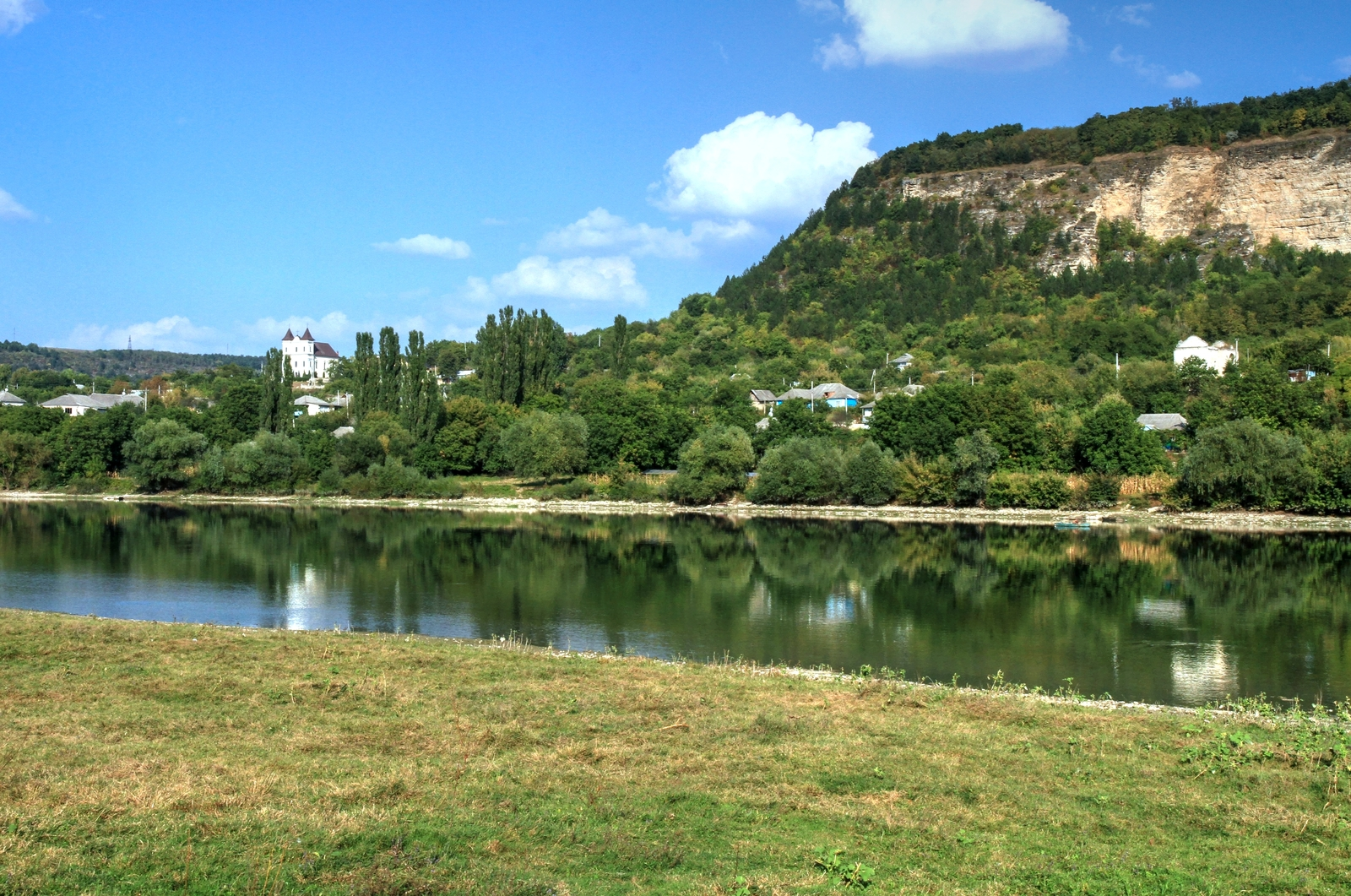
- Panorama of Rașcov from the Dnester River

- Location within Moldova
- Coordinates: 47°57′4″N 28°50′20″E
- Country (de jure): Moldova
- Country (de facto): Transnistria (Note: Transnistria's political status is disputed. It considers itself to be an independent state, but this is not recognised by any UN member state. The Moldovan government and the international community consider Transnistria a part of Moldova's territory.)
- Elevation: 60 m (200 ft)

Population (2004)
  - Total: 2,003
- Time zone: UTC+2 (EET)
  - Summer (DST): UTC+3 (EEST)

Rașcov (Moldovan Cyrillic: Рашков; alternative names Râșcov, Rașcu; Ukrainian: Рашків, romanized: Rashkiv; Russian: Рашково, romanized: Rashkovo; Polish: Raszków) is one of the oldest communes of Transnistria. It is located in the northern part, between Rîbnița and Camenca. It is composed of two villages, Iantarnoe (Янтарне, Янтарное) and Rașcov.

== History ==
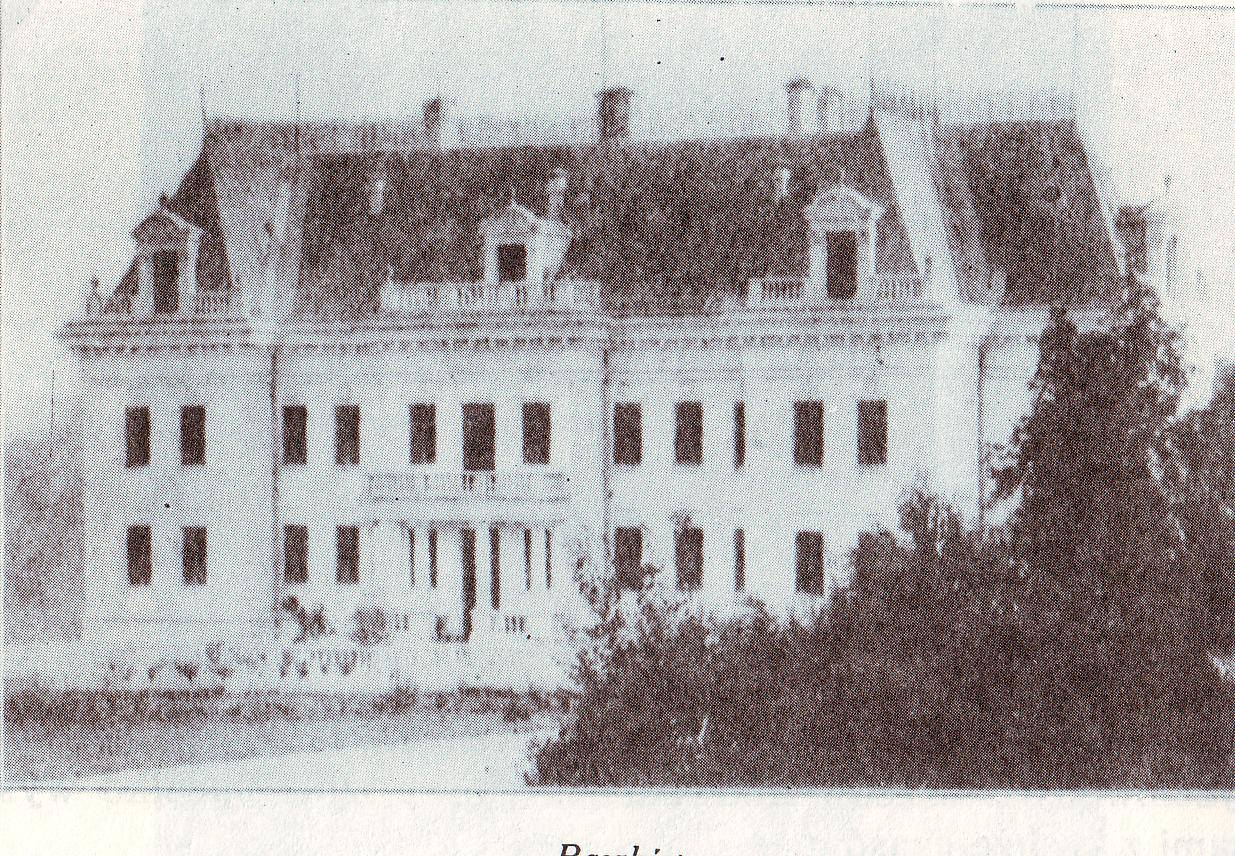
Juriewicz Palace (demolished)

Rașcov village was founded in 1402 as a trading post on the Dniester river. Some maintain that the name derives from the Romanian term for Lactarius deliciosus, a species of mushroom-forming fungus. However, there are a number of settlements across Poland and Ukraine with the same name, casting doubt on this claim. Rashkov (Bulgarian: Рашков) is also a Bulgarian male surname.

One of the oldest villages of Transnistria, it is known for having been home in the past to a significant Polish population. From the 15th century, all of northern Transnistria was part of the Grand Duchy of Lithuania, and later to the Kingdom of Poland in the Polish–Lithuanian Commonwealth (1569–1793) which encouraged the migration of peasants into the territory from neighboring populated areas (from north and from west).

During the Middle Ages, the village hosted one of seven major fairs for the Dniester-Southern Bug area (the others being Mohuliv, Dubăsari, Yampil, Silibria, Yaruga, and Vasilcău). Before becoming part of the Russian Empire in 1793 during the second partition of Poland, the largest groups living between the Dniester and the Bug rivers were Moldavian, Ruthenian (Ukrainian) and Tatar peasants.

=== Hasidic Jewish history ===
Rașcov was the home of Rabbi Jacob Joseph of Polonne, a leading Jewish Hasidic tzaddik and one of the first disciples of the founder of Hasidic Judaism, the Baal Shem Tov. His book, Toldos Yaacov Yosef, (published on 1780), was the first hasidic work ever published. His work is one of the foremost sources for saying of the Baal Shem Tov and members of his court, and Jacob Joseph quotes things he himself heard the Baal Shem Tov say in a section entitled "Words I Heard from My Master."

=== Historic sites ===
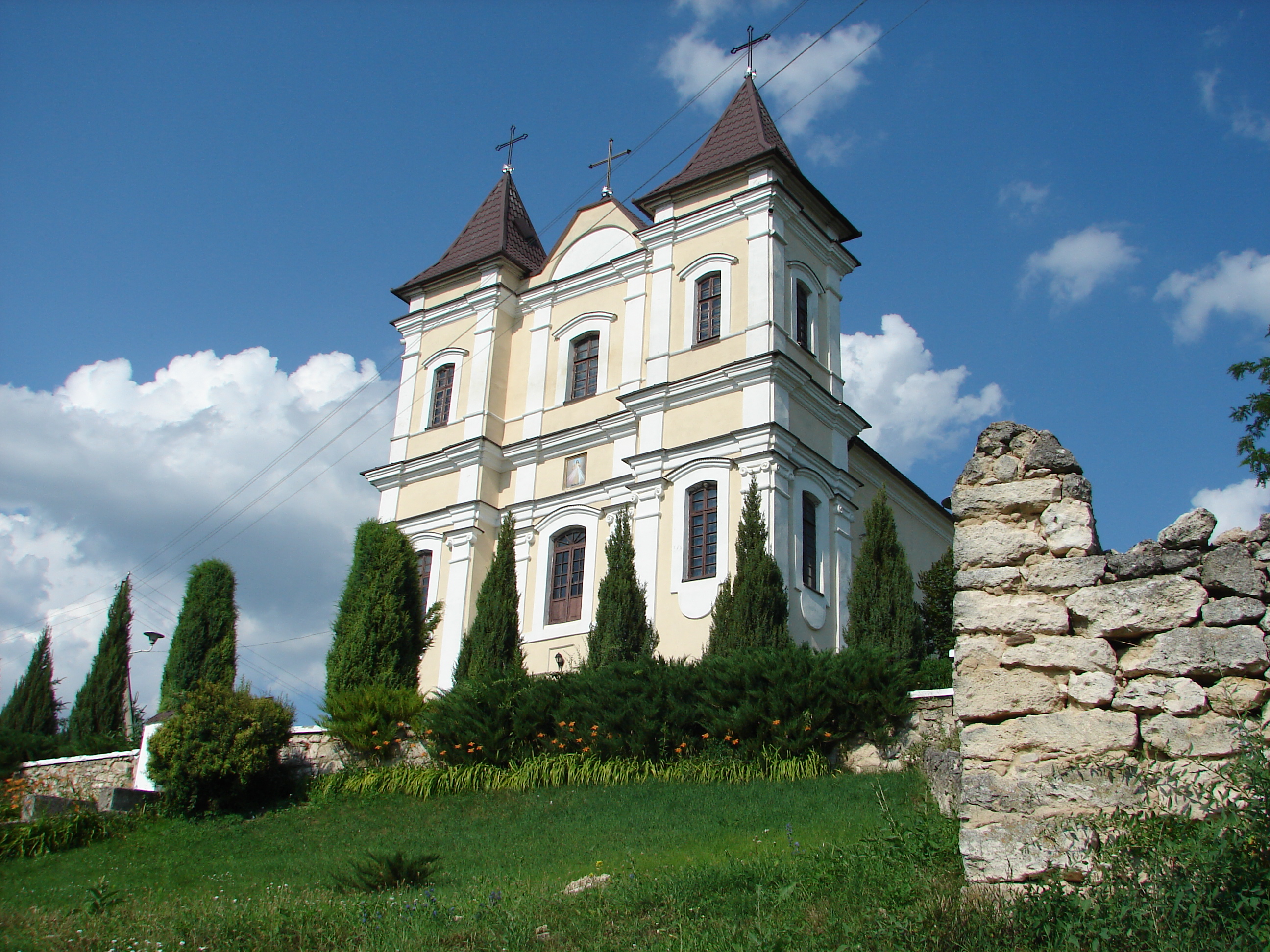
Saint Cajetan Church

Rașcov and the surrounding area is home to numerous historic monuments and architecture, among them the Polish Roman Catholic Saint Cajetan Church, considered a historical heritage. It has recently undergone extensive renovation. The church was built when this part of Transnistria was a part of the Crown of the Polish Kingdom, with generous contributions by the Moldavian prince Petru Rareș.

Near Rașcov is also located the Kalaur Castle, a defunct castle of the Grand Duchy of Lithuania founded in the 14th century.

== Landscape ==
Outside Rașcov is located the Rașcov National Park, an extensive natural landscape preserve and an ecologically protected area.

More recently, the Transnistrian separatist authorities have edited an Atlas of Transnistria, which refers to the area around Rașcov as the "Transnistrian Alps": Time, wind, and water have eroded the abrupt slopes near the village of Rașcov, having formed the limestone outliers, towering above the slopes.
