= Raszów =

Raszów may refer to the following places in Poland:

- Raszów, Kamienna Góra County in Gmina Kamienna Góra, Kamienna Góra County in Lower Silesian Voivodeship (SW Poland)
- Raszów, Trzebnica County in Gmina Trzebnica, Trzebnica County in Lower Silesian Voivodeship (SW Poland)
