= Saint Cajetan Church, Rașcov =

Saint Cajetan
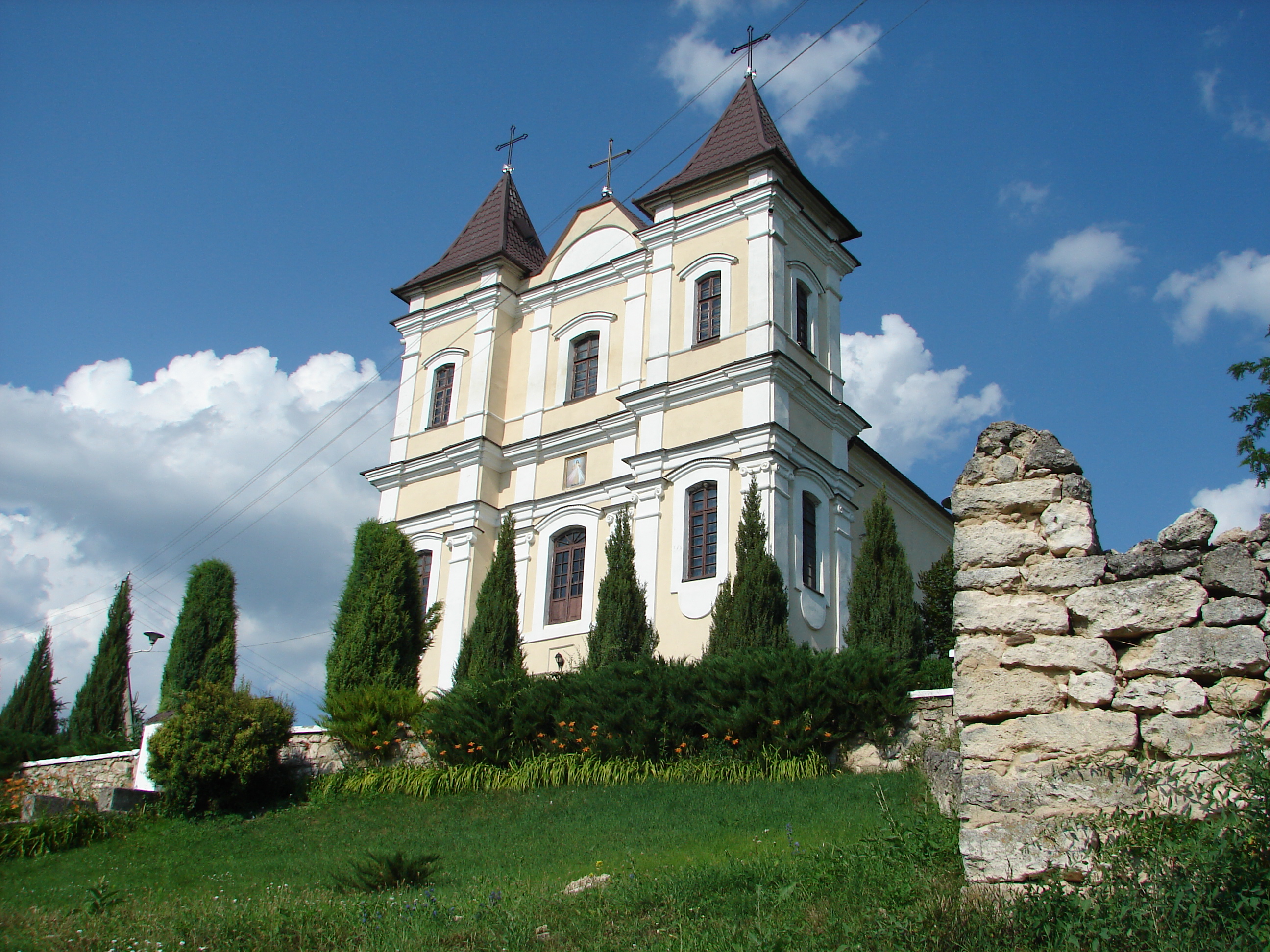
- Saint Cajetan
- Location: Râşcov
- Country: Moldova
- Denomination: Roman Catholic

History
- Status: Church
- Dedication: Saint Cajetan

Administration
- Diocese: Roman Catholic Diocese of Chișinău

Saint Cajetan (Romanian: Biserica "Sfântul Caietan", Polish: Kościół pw. św. Kajetana) is a Roman Catholic church of the Polish era in Râşcov, northern Transnistria a disputed territory with Moldova, which has recently undergone extensive renovation and which the PMR government considers a historical heritage location. The church was built in the 16th century, when northern Transnistria was a part of the Crown of the Polish Kingdom.
