= Monuments of national significance in Vinnytsia Oblast =

List of cultural heritage monuments of national significance in Vinnytsia Oblast.

== Listings ==
No.	Photo	Name	Date	Location	Type	Protected number
1		Manor of writer and public figure Mykhailo Kotsiubynsky	mid-2nd half of 19th century	Vinnytsia, vulytsia Bevza, 15	monument of history	020001-N
2		Grave-tomb of surgeon, anatomist, and pedagogue Nikolay Pirogov	1881	Vinnytsia, Druhyi Provulok Vyshnevskoho, 16	monument of history	020002-N
3		Manor of surgeon, anatomist, and pedagogue Nikolay Pirogov	2nd half of 19th century	Vinnytsia, vulytsia M.Pyrohova, 155a	monument of history	020003-N
4		Monument of surgeon, anatomist, and pedagogue Nikolay Pirogov	1971	Vinnytsia, corner of vulytsia M.Pyrohova and vulytsia L.Tolstoho	monument of monumental art	020004-N
5		Hillfort	9th-4th century BCE	Vinnytsia Raion, village Luka-Meleshkivska	monument of archaeology	020005-N
6		Hillfort	9th-4th century BCE	Vinnytsia Raion, village Yakushyntsi (outside north-east)	monument of archaeology	020006-N
7		Severynivka hillfort	7th-6th century BCE	Zhmerynka Raion, village Mezhyriv (outside south-west)	monument of archaeology	020007-N
8		Hillfort I	9th-13th century	Illintsi Raion, urban settlement Dashiv (outside west)	monument of archaeology	020008-N
9		Hillfort II	9th-13th century	Illintsi Raion, urban settlement Dashiv (outside west)	monument of archaeology	020009-N
10		Hillfort	9th-13th century	Illintsi Raion, village Zhornyshche (outside east)	monument of archaeology	020010-N
11		Hillfort	9th-13th century	Illintsi Raion, village Parkhomivka (outside east)	monument of archaeology	020011-N
12		Grave of microbiologist and epidemiologist academician Danylo Zabolotny	1929	Kryzhopil Raion, village Zabolotne, vullytsia Zabolotnoho, 3	monument of history	020012-N
13		Hillfort	9th-13th century	Kryzhopil Raion, village Kryklyvets (outside south-east)	monument of archaeology	020013-N
14		Bohatosharove hillfort	9th-4th century BCE, 9th-13th century	Myholiv-Podilskyi Raion, village Hryhorivka (south edge of Shchovb tract)	monument of archaeology	020014-N
15		Rock monastery	9th-13th century	Myholiv-Podilskyi Raion, village Liadova	monument of archaeology	020015-N
16		Hillfort	9th-4th century BCE	Murovani Kurylivtsi Raion, village Dereshova (outside south)	monument of archaeology	020016-N
17		Hillfort	9th-13th century	Murovani Kurylivtsi Raion, village Popeliukhy (outside south-west)	monument of archaeology	020017-N
18		Hillfort	9th-4th century BCE	Nemyriv Raion, Nemyriv (outside south-east)	monument of archaeology	020018-N
19		Hillfort	9th-13th century	Nemyriv Raion, village Dzhuryntsi (outside south-west)	monument of archaeology	020019-N
20		Hillfort	9th-13th century	Nemyriv Raion, village Dubovets (outside north-east)	monument of archaeology	020020-N
21		Grave of composer Mykola Leontovych	1921	Teplyk Raion, village Markivka	monument of history	020021-N
22		Grave of composer Petro Nishchynsky	1896	Tyvriv Raion, village Voroshylivka	monument of history	020022-N
23		Grave of the Bohdan Khmelnytsky's comrade-in-arms Danylo Nechai	1651	Tyvriv Raion, village Cheremoshne	monument of history	020023-N
24		Monument of composer Mykola Leontovych	1969	Tulchyn Raion, Tulchyn, vulytsia Lenina	monument of monumental art	020024-N
25		Hillfort	9th-13th century	Tulchyn Raion, village Suvorovske (outside west)	monument of archaeology	020025-N
26		Hillfort	9th-4th century BCE	Chernivtsi Raion, village Vyla-Yaruzki (outside east)	monument of archaeology	020026-N
27		Defense fortification with underground passages	5th-17th century	Yampil Raion, village Busha	monument of archaeology	020027-N
28		Rock temple with relief images	5th-17th century	Yampil Raion, village Busha	monument of archaeology	020028-N

== List of historic and cultural reserves ==
- Historic and Cultural Reserve "Busha"
