= Nemyriv Park =

National park in Nemyriv, Ukraine

Coordinates: 48.966944°N 28.845°E

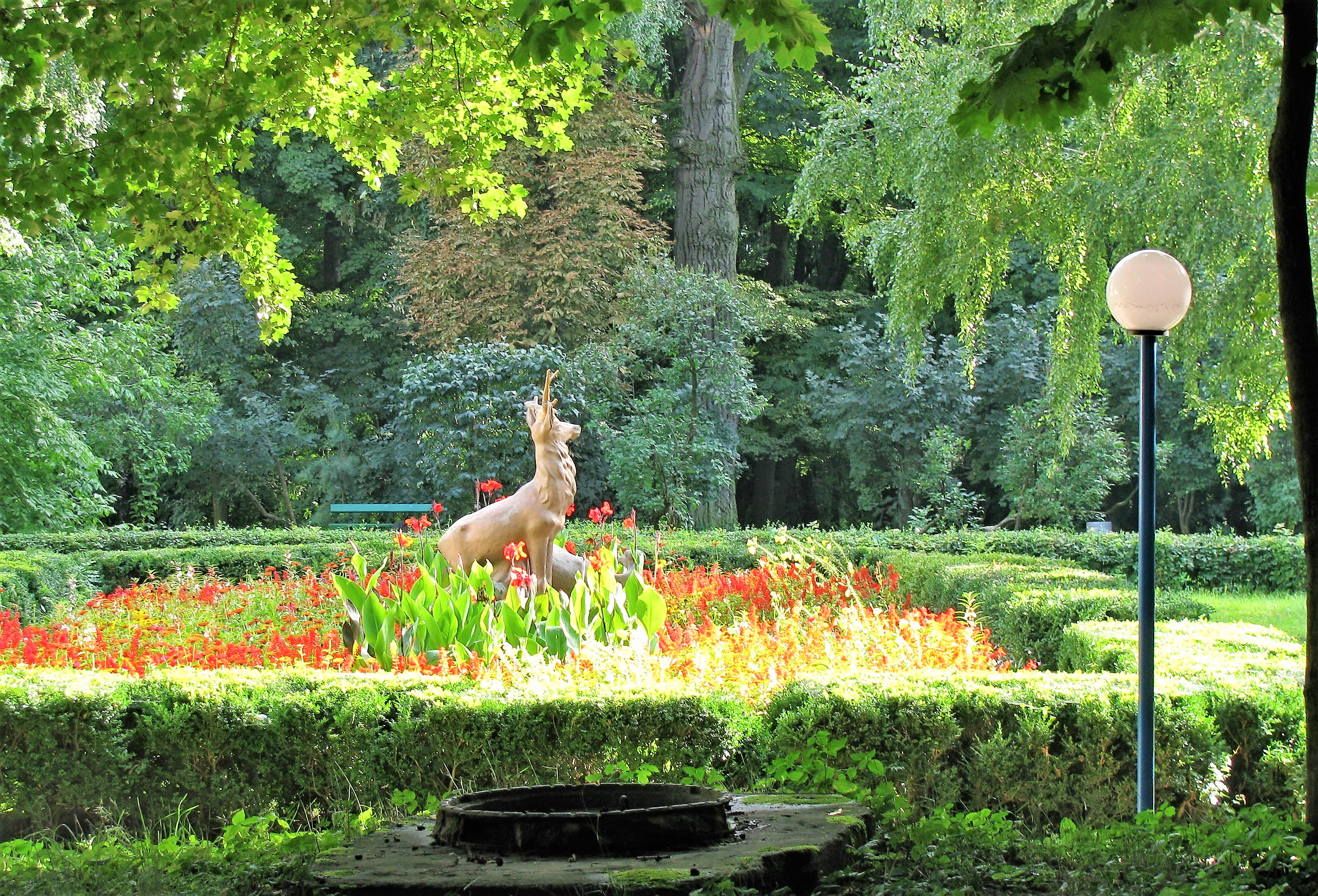

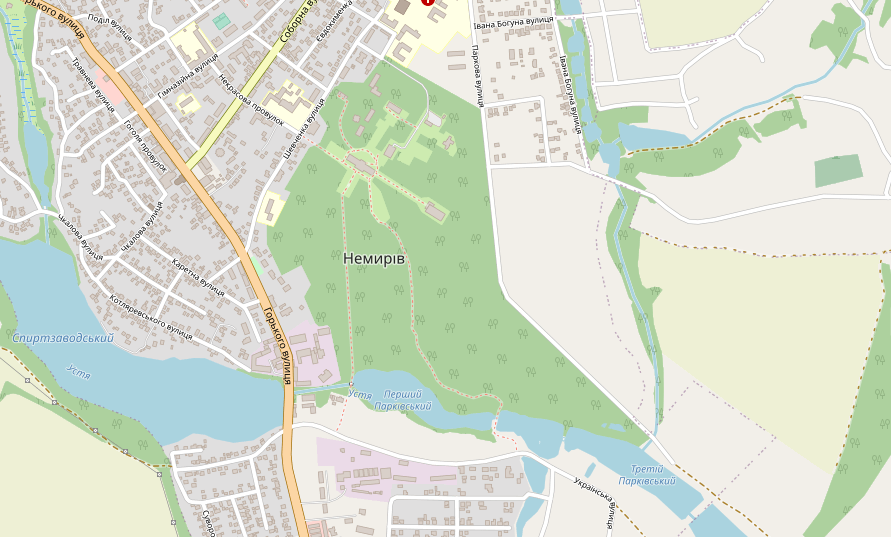
- Type: Public
- Location: Nemyriv, Ukraine

Nemyriv Park is a national park located in Nemyriv, Vinnytsia region, Ukraine.

== History ==
The park was founded by Polish magnate Vincentius Potocki in 1787. In 1887, Princess Maria Shcherbatova became the legal owner of the park land. She rebuilt Potocki Palace, which was located in the parking area. According to some sources, Shcherbatova sought to make something that would be similar to the British Stowe Gardens. Following this period, the park's area was enlarged.

A new palace was started. The construction project lasted 40 years and was developed by architects Kramazh and Hryner. In the late 19th and early 20th centuries, the territory of the park was divided. Parts were located on different sides of the palace and separated by broad valleys. Gardeners from Vienna, Brussels, and Prague worked there.

The daughter of Shcherbatova, Oleksandra, planted decorative shrubs and flowers. Plants were placed in the greenhouse and then transplanted into the park. In the spring of 1921, Avangard sanatorium was created there. Nemyriv Park obtained conservation status in accordance with resolution No. 18 of the State Committee Board of the Council of Ministers of the Ukrainian SSR on ecology and sustainable use of natural resources, dated 30 August 1990.

The Palace and Park of Princess Shcherbatova were recognized as the "Vinnytsia Pearl" by the decision No. 449 of the 14th session of the Regional Council of the 5th convocation dated 18 December 2007. Nemyriv Park was approved as a park-monument of the landscape of national significance by order No. 158 dated 10 April 2013, issued by the Ministry of Ecology and Natural Resources. Sanatorium buildings "Clinical sanatorium Avangard" were constructed in the park. The park is visited by students of the Nemirovsky College of Civil Engineering and Architecture.

== Biome ==
Nemyriv Park is located in the Nemyriv-Tulchyn geobotanical region of hornbeam-oak and ordinary oak forests. There are twice as many hornbeam-oak forests as ordinary oak forests. Nemyriv Park occupies 85 hectares. A system of ponds functions in the southern part. The palace and household buildings are well-preserved. The borders of the park have not changed since the time of Princess Shcherbatova. A French garden sits near the eastern facade of the palace. Hornbeam, fir, and yew grow there. The park acquired its conservation status in order to protect the collection of plants, the palace (an architectural monument of the 18th century), ponds, and sculptures.

== Flora ==
The pine forest is located in the scenic part of the park. It occupies 50% of the total park area. The deciduous forest is placed on the gray forest soils. Ash commonly prevails on its territory. One meter oaks reach a height of 22–25 meters. The number of trees and shrubs species has decreased by more than two times. When the park was founded, 250 species and forms of trees grew there. In the 21st century, their number is 120. Ginkgo, Weymouth pine, Black pine, Pseudotsuga, Platanus occidentalis, Japanese pagoda tree, European spruce, Siberian pine, Silver linden, Kentucky coffeetree, Robinia pseudoacacia, Colorado spruce. Scots pine is common in areas with podsolized sandy loam. Their height on average is 20 meters and the average diameter is 40 centimeters. Oak, spruce, beech, fir, hornbeam, coffee and plane trees are there. At most 20 rare trees remain in the park; the rest are new plants.
