= Taras Shevchenko Dnipro Academic Ukrainian Music and Drama Theatre =

Theatre in Dnipro, Ukraine

- Дніпровський академічний український музично-драматичний театр імені Тараса Шевченка
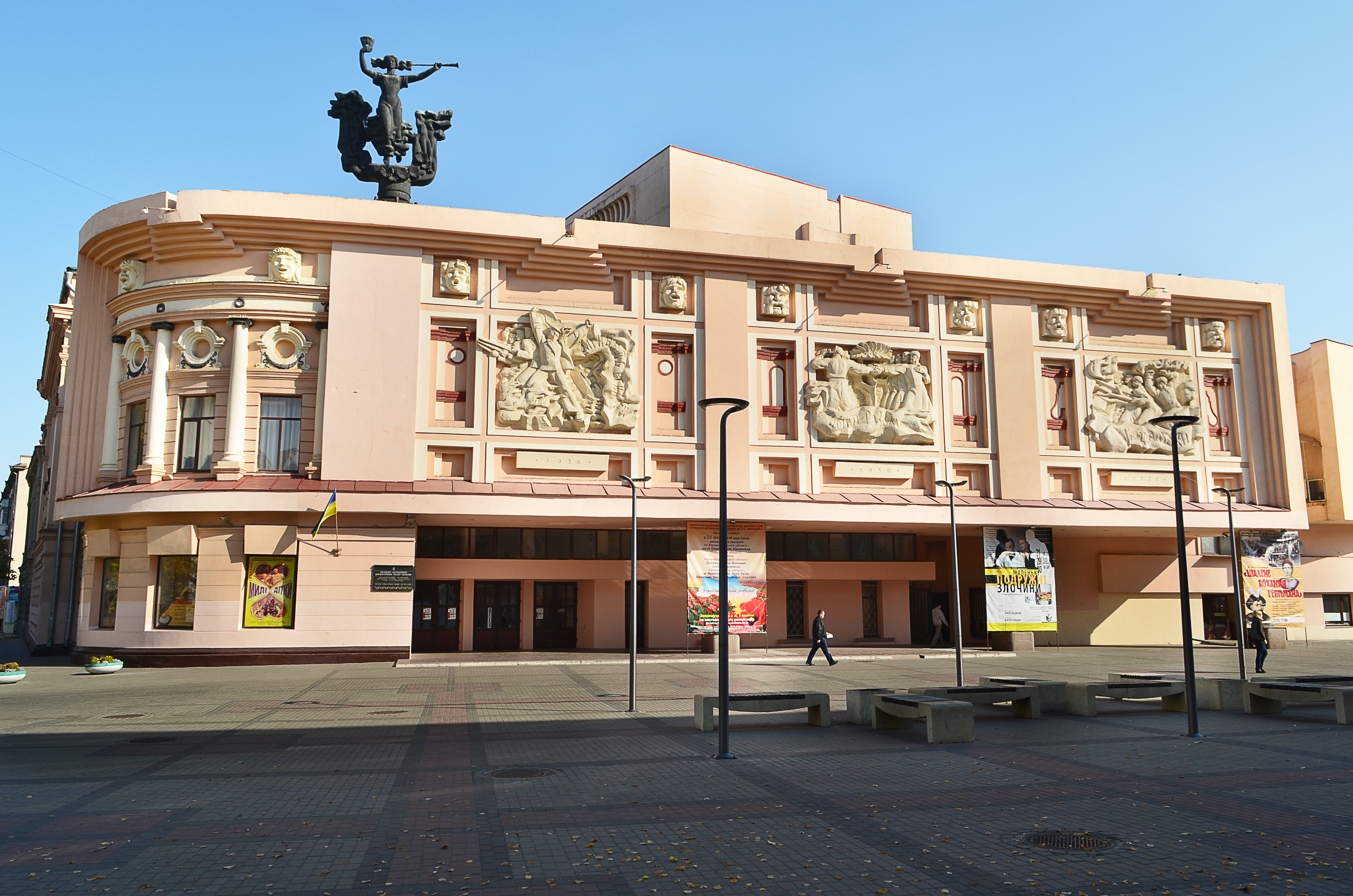
- The theatre in 2014
- Interactive map of Taras Shevchenko Dnipro Academic Ukrainian Music and Drama Theatre
- Address: 5 Voskresenska Street; Dnipro; Ukraine
- Location: Dnipro, Dnipropetrovsk Oblast, Ukraine
- Coordinates: 48.4706947°N 35.0331986°E

Construction
- Built: 1913
- Opened: 1918
- Rebuilt: 1979

Website
- ukrdrama.dp.ua

Immovable Monument of National Significance of Ukraine
- Official name: Будинок театру (Theatre Building)
- Type: Architecture
- Reference no.: 040031

The Taras Shevchenko Dnipro Academic Ukrainian Music and Drama Theatre (Ukrainian: Дніпровський академічний український музично-драматичний театр імені Тараса Шевченка, romanized: Dniprovskyi akademichnyi ukrainskyi muzychno-dramatychnyi teatr imeni Tarasa Shevchenka) is a 20th-century city theatre and architectural landmark in the city of Dnipro, Ukraine. It was the nation's first professional theatre to hold national cultural importance status.

== History ==
Constructed in 1913, the theatre was situated in what was once the English Club. The structure is two stories tall and has an uneven layout. Established on 23 August 1918 in Kyiv, the Taras Shevchenko Dnipropetrovsk Academic Ukrainian Music and Drama Theatre became the country's first professional theatre. It was formerly known as the National Drama Theatre and was granted state status by a law enacted by the Ukrainian government of Pavlo Skoropadskyi on 23 August 1918, as substantiated by the National Bulletin No.42.43.

The theatre featured both domestic and foreign classic plays, including Forest Song by Lesya Ukrainka, which marked the start of the theatre's operations in November 1918; Taras Shevchenko's Haidamaky (directed by Les Kurbas); Disharmoniy by Volodymyr Vynnychenko; Inspector by Nikolai Gogol; Ghosts by Henrik Ibsen; Weavers by Gerhart Hauptmann; Mirandolin by Carlo Goldoni, and Tartuffe by Molière. The group had a successful tour of Ukraine in 1921–1922.

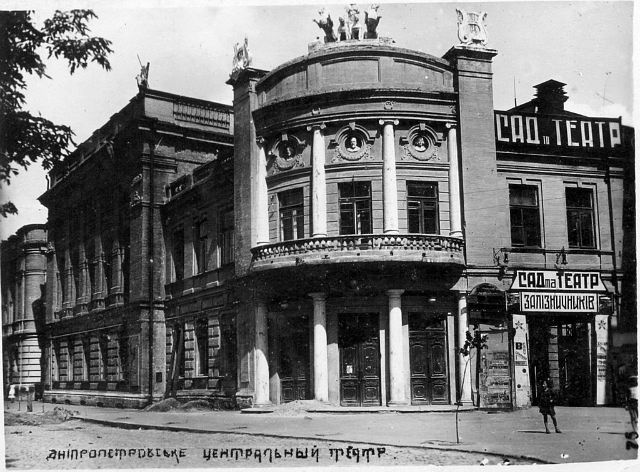
The theatre seen prior to 1923

The first National Drama Theatre replaced the Shevchenko First Theatre of the Ukrainian Soviet Republic in 1919. The early directors of the theatre of the European repertoire were Ivan Maryanenko, the director of the theatre, and Alexander Zagarov, the main director. Famous performers performed at the theatre in the 1920s, including Pavlo Tychyna, Les Kurbas, Anna Borisoglebskaya, Liubov Hakkebush, Natalia Uzhviy, and many others.

The city hosted the relocation of Ukraine's first national theatre to Dnipropetrovsk in 1927. During the 1930s, a number of nationally recognized directors were produced. More than 300 performances were held at the front by two concert groups under the direction of principal directors Kobrynsky and Zinaida Khrukalova during World War II. The performers were relocated to Kazakhstan during the war, where they carried on with their job. Specifically, they performed in over 300 performances near the front. The theatre then made its way back to Dnipro.

Comedies and operettas were popular with audiences in the years following the war. For decades, a considerable number of them remained on stage. Graduates from the Dnipropetrovsk Theatre School joined the group in the 1950s. Music drama began to be performed in 1958. The group included a number of more performers and actresses in the 1960s, and for many years they promoted Ukrainian culture. From the 1970s to 80s saw more people joining the theatre group. The theater was rebuilt in 1979 in accordance with the design of architects V. Khalyavsky and E. Yashunsky. Sculptor Y. Pavlov made bas-reliefs on the theatre front based on themes from stage shows.

Following Ukraine's declaration of independence, plays based on the writings of authors who were persona non grata during the Soviet Union began to appear on the stage. Sculptor K. Chekanev's 1993 busts of G. Skovoroda, I. Franko, L. Ukrainka, V. Vynnychenko, and V. Stus are placed on the theatre ground, along Voskresenska Street. Valery Kovtunenko oversaw the theatre from 1994 to 2016, elevating it to a new level and making it a hub for spiritual and societal revival during that time. The theatre was elevated to academic status in 2004. With the help of the League of Azerbaijanis of Ukraine's Dnipropetrovsk branch, an operetta called Arshin Mal Alan made its world debut in 2005.

The theatre's interior was renovated in 2009. Equipment for modern lighting was bought. The theatre commemorated its 95th anniversary in 2013. The theatre's chamber stage had a reconstruction and renovation in 2014, along with new lighting fixtures. 2018 saw the renovation of the theatre's exterior and interior, commemorating one hundred years since the theatre's founding in Kyiv. President Poroshenko issued an executive order granting the theater national cultural importance status on 17 December 2018. With the assistance of the Ukrainian Cultural Foundation, the theatre group put on a concert titled Angels Protect You on 28 September 2019 at the Palace of Culture Orbit as part of VIE Festival.

== Gallery ==
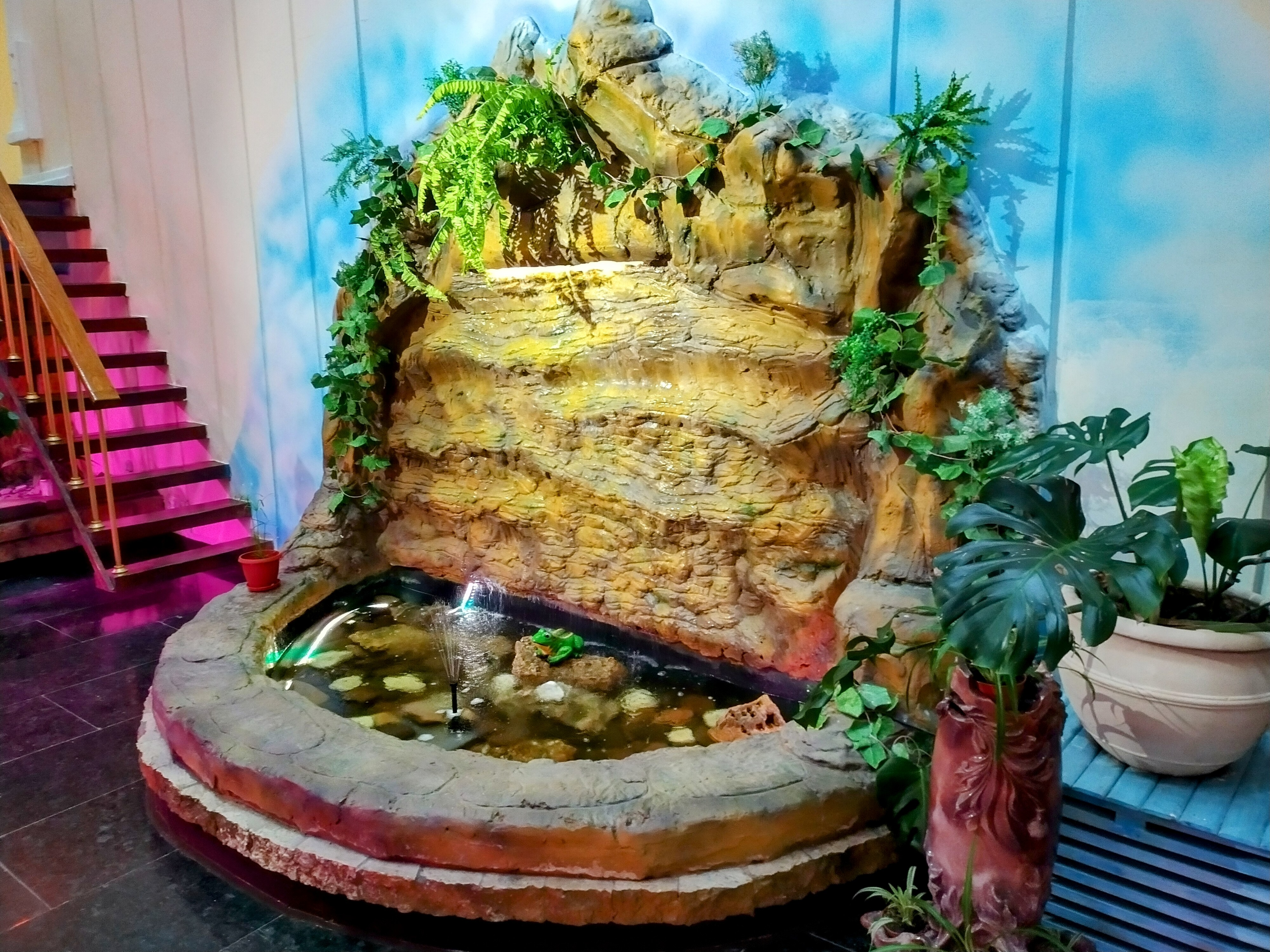
A decorative fountain inside the theatre

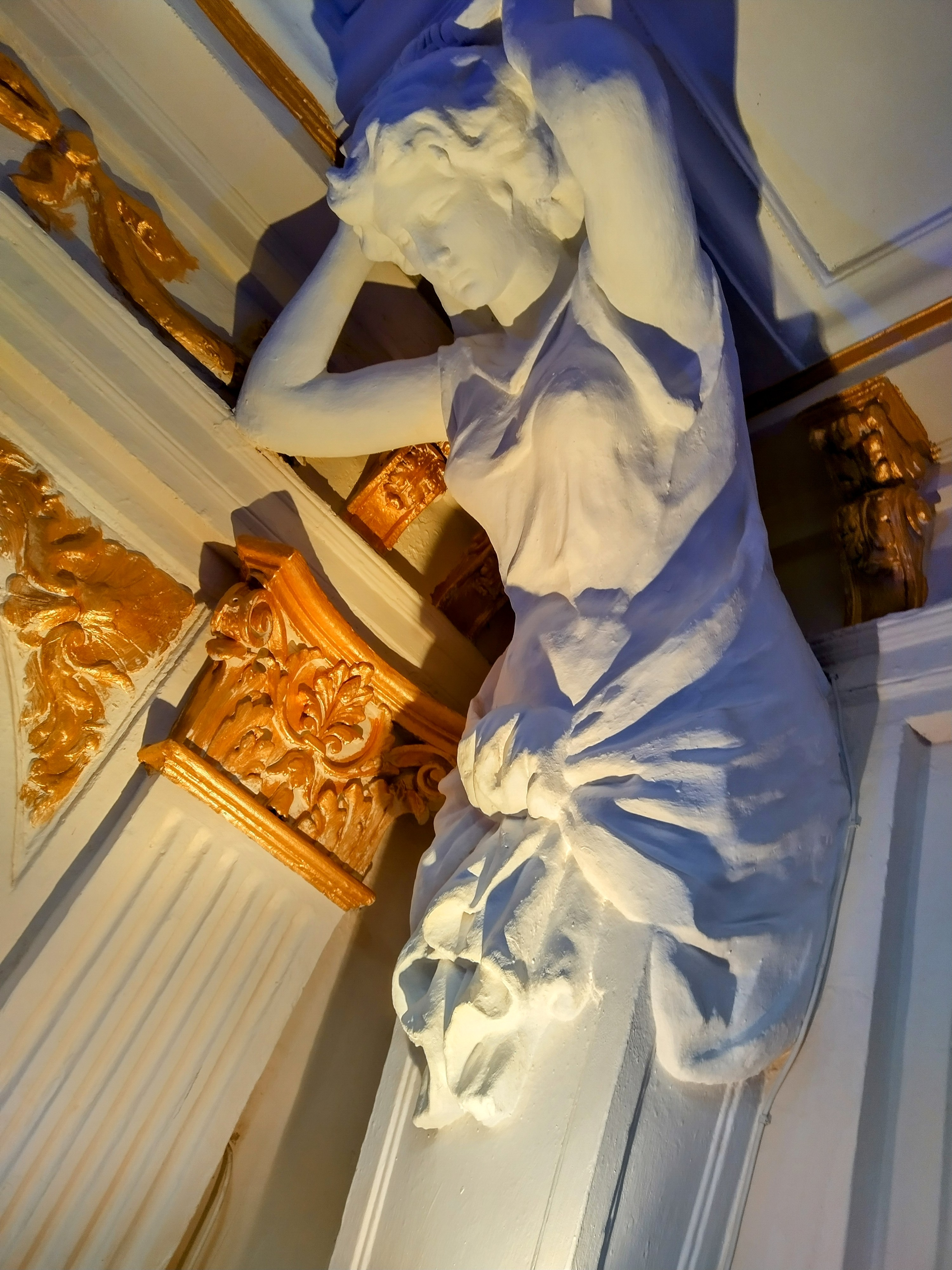
Sculptures inside the theatre

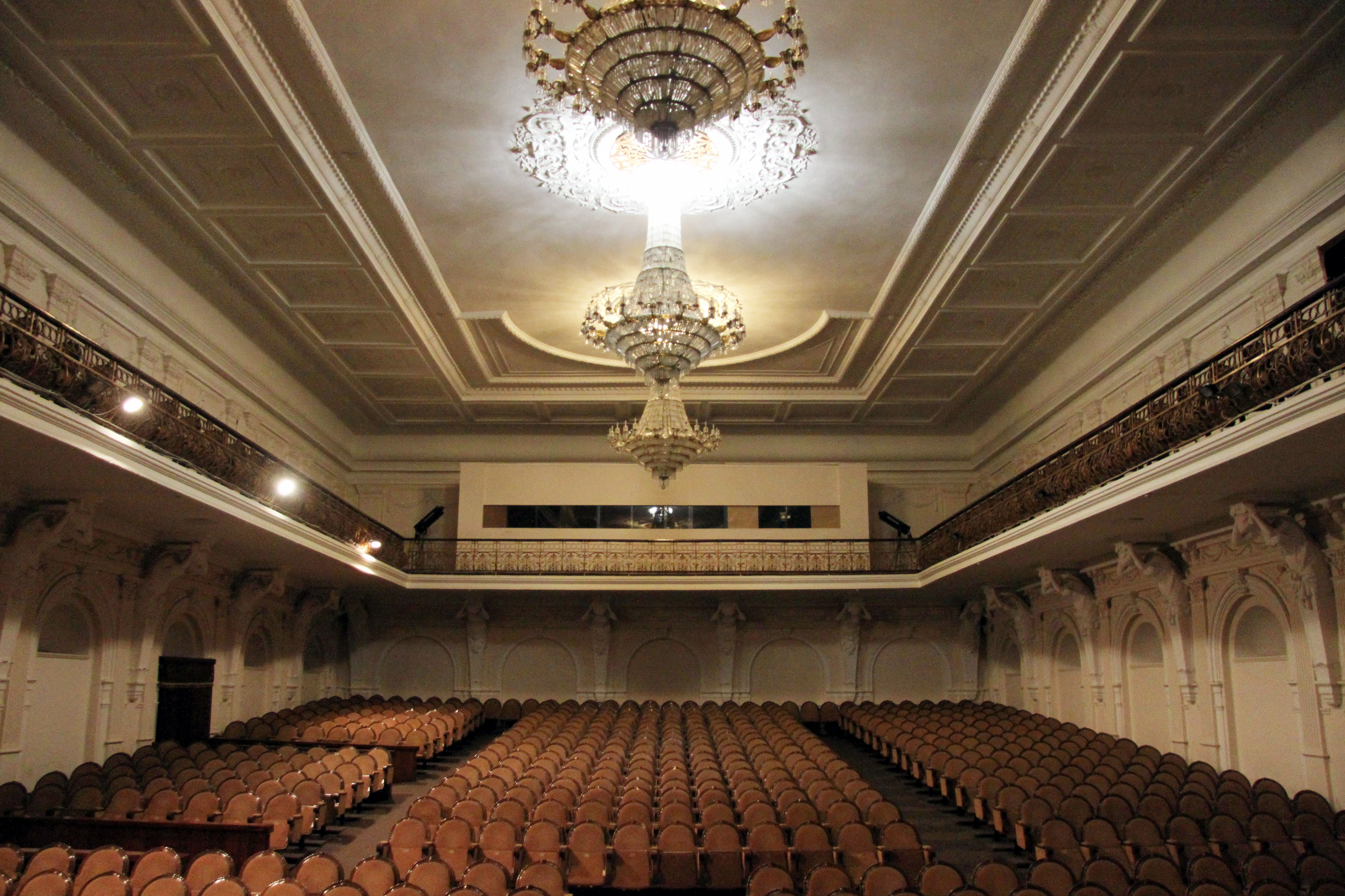
The theatre hall in 2015

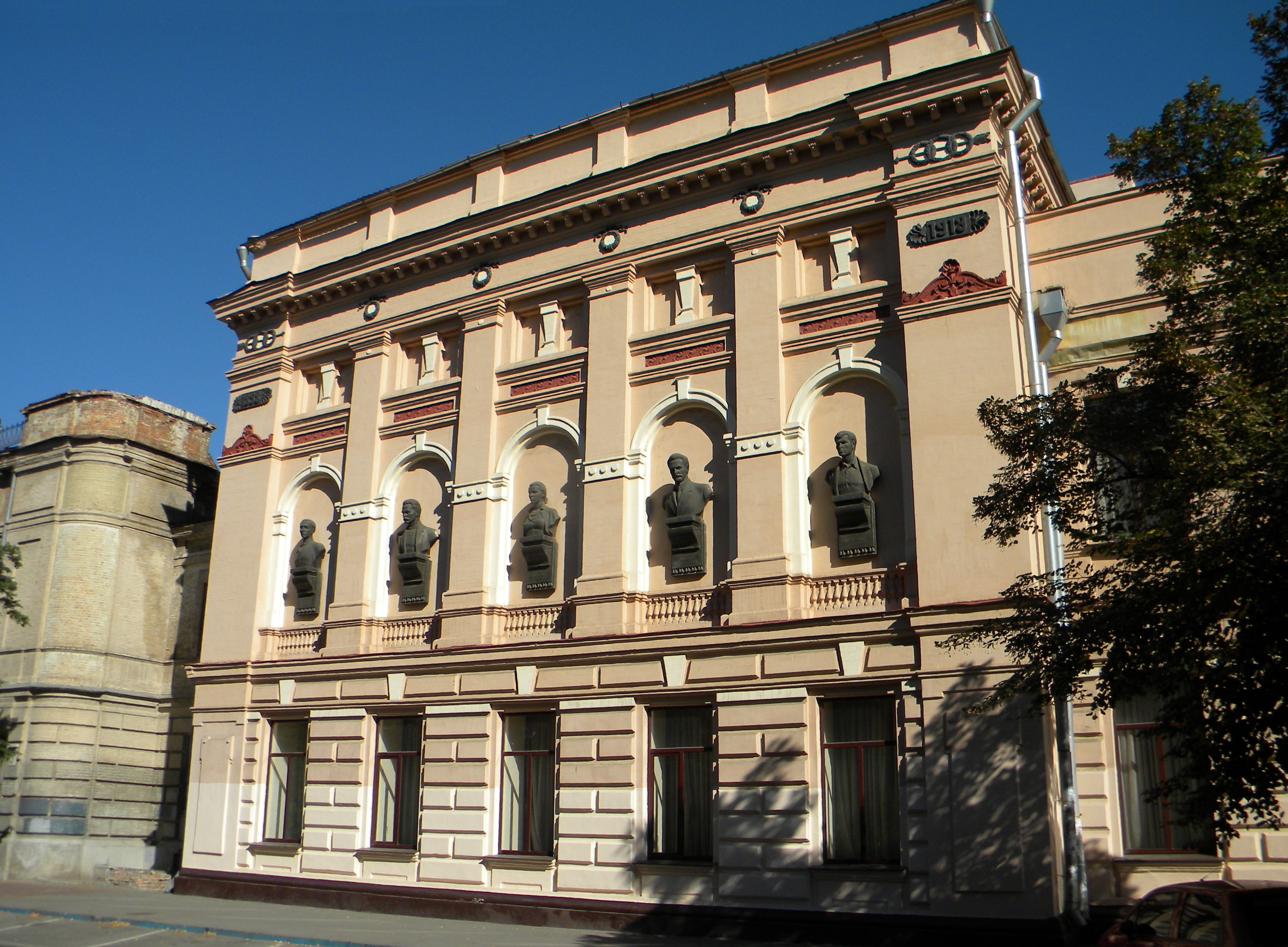
The theatre's side façade in 2015

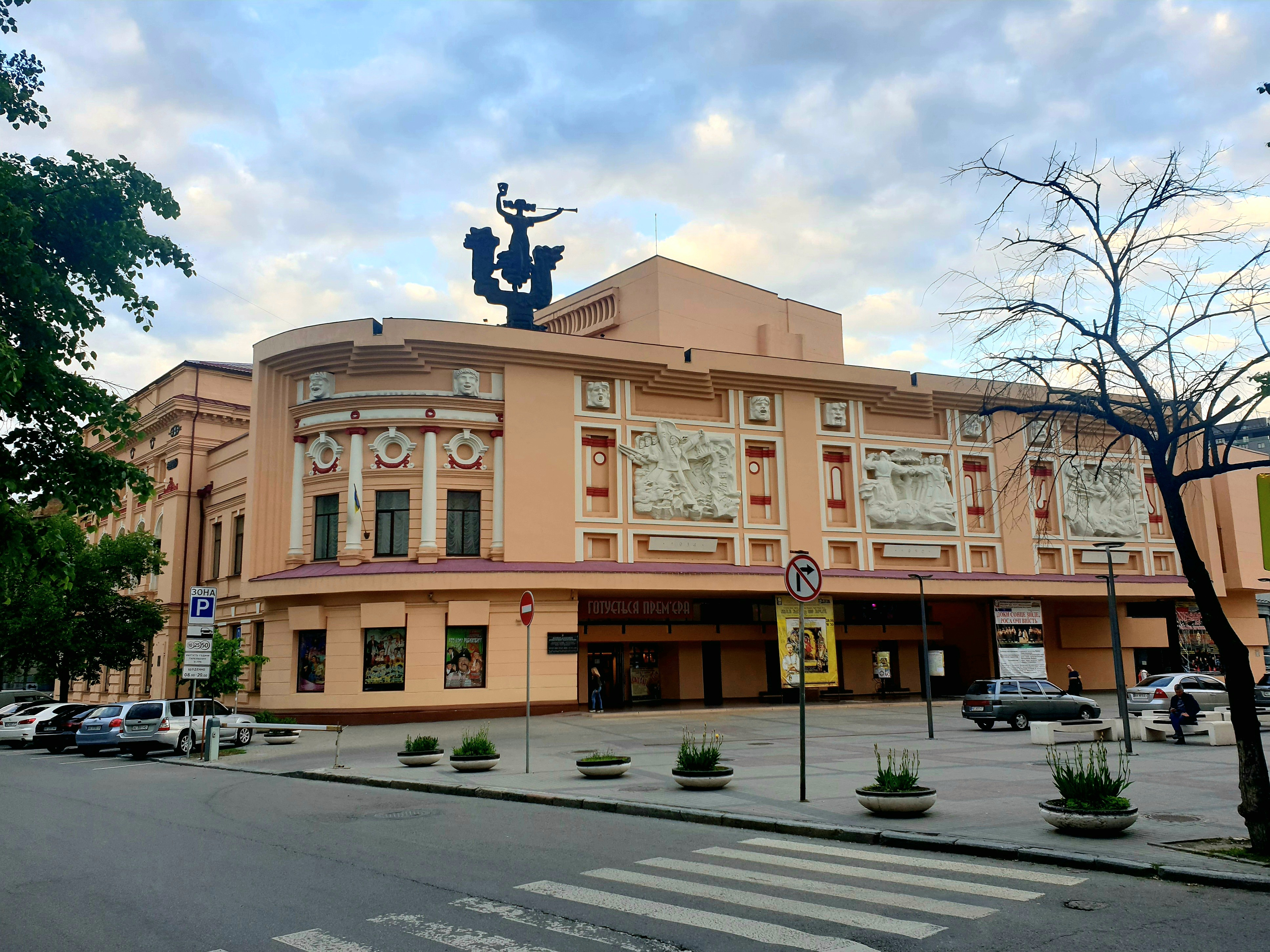
The theatre in 2021

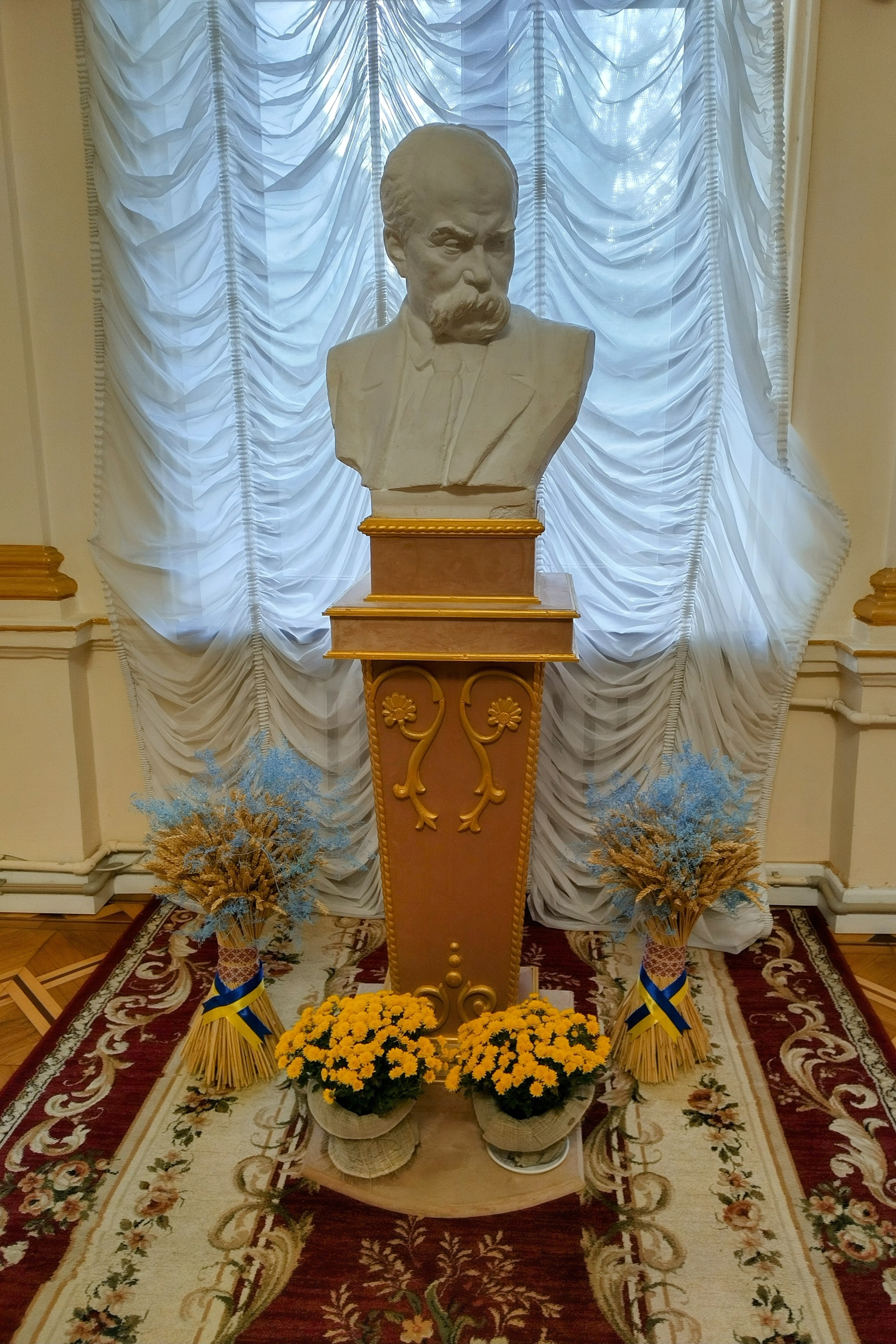
Bust of Taras Shevchenko in 2023
