= Marko Vovchok =

Ukrainian writer (1833–1907)

Mariya Vilinska Марія Вілінська
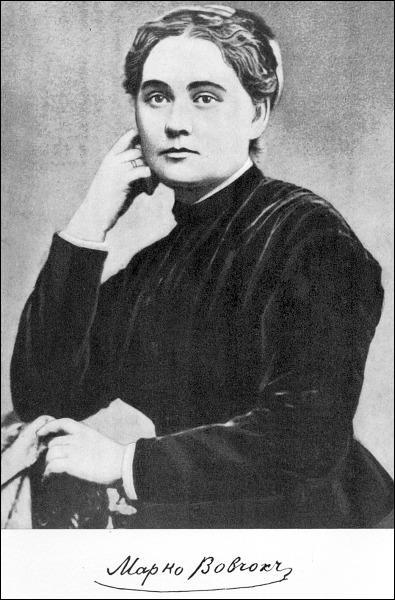
- Born: 22 December 1833; Yekaterininskoye, Yeletsky Uyezd, Oryol Governorate, Russian Empire
- Died: 10 August 1907 (aged 73); Dolinsk, Terek Oblast, Russian Empire
- Occupations: Writer, translator
- Writing career
- Pen name: Marko Vovchok; Марко Вовчок

Marko Vovchok (Ukrainian: Марко́ Вовчо́к, Ukrainian pronunciation: [mɐrˈkɔ ʋou̯ˈt͡ʃɔk]; nee Mariia Vilinskа, surname by the first marriage: Markovych, surname by the second marriage: Lobach-Zhuchenko, Russian: Мария Александровна Вилинская; 22 December 1833 – 10 August 1907) was a Ukrainian female writer of Russian descent. Her pen name, Marko Vovchok, was invented by Panteleimon Kulish. Her works had an anti-serfdom orientation and described the historical past of Ukraine. In the 1860s, Vovchok gained considerable literary fame in Ukraine after the publication in 1857 of a Ukrainian-language collection, Folk Tales.

In terms of literary fiction, Marko is considered to be one of the first influential modernist authors in Ukraine. Her works "shaped the development of the Ukrainian short story". Also, she enriched the Ukrainian literature with a number of new genres, in particular, the social story (Instytutka). The story Marusya, translated and adapted into French, became popular in Western Europe at the end of the 19th century.

After a scandal over the plagiarism of her translations into Russian in the 1870s, she almost ended her literary career. Later it was uncovered that she didn't do the translations in question, but hired underpaid ghostwriters. Until now, there are different opinions about the authorship of Ukrainian works by Marko Vovchok. Discussions about her magnum opus Folk Tales have been going on since the middle of the 19th century: many literary critics (including the editor of the collection Panteleimon Kulish) believe that it was co-authored with her first husband, ethnographer Opanas Markovych.

== Biography ==
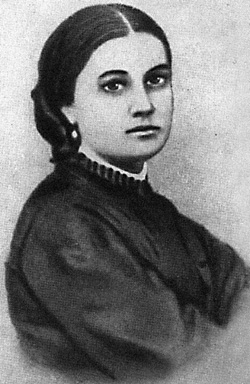
Marko Vovchok in her youth in Russia

Mariya Vilinska was born in 1833 in the Oryol Governorate of the Russian Empire into the family of an army officer and a noblewoman. After she lost her father at the age of 7, she was raised at her aunt's estate and then sent off to study first to Kharkov (now Kharkiv, Ukraine) and then to Oryol. In 1851 she moved to Ukraine, having married Opanas Markovych, a folklorist and ethnographer who was a member of the Brotherhood of Saints Cyril and Methodius. From 1851 till 1858 she lived in Chernihiv, Kyiv and Nemyriv, assisting her husband with his ethnographic work, studying the Ukrainian culture and language. In 1857 Marko Vovchok wrote Narodni opovidannya (Folk Stories). It was met with immediate acclaim in Ukrainian literary circles, in particular from Taras Shevchenko and Panteleimon Kulish, and in Russia, after it had been translated into Russian and edited by Ivan Turgenev as Ukrainskie narodnye rasskazy (Ukrainian Folk Tales, 1859).

After a short stay in Saint Petersburg in 1859, Marko Vovchok moved to Central Europe, where she resided in Germany, France, Italy and Switzerland. From 1867 to 1878, she again lived in Saint Petersburg, where due to the prohibition against the Ukrainian language she wrote and translated for Russian magazines. Vovchok wrote in Russian Zhivaya dusha (The living soul, 1868), Zapiski prichyotnika (Notes of a junior deacon, 1870), V glushi (In the backwoods, 1875), and several other novels.

After gaining considerable publicity for her plagiarism, when she attributed other people's Russian translations to herself, and the collapse of the Translations of the Best Foreign Writers magazine, Vovchok left St. Petersburg in 1872 and settled on the estate of her acquaintances in the Tver province. Living in the "province", she continued to write in Russian. In particular, at this time her novels and short stories "Warm Nest" (Ukr. Teple Gnezdechko, 1873), "In the Wilderness" (Ukr. In the game, 1875), "Rest in the village" (Ukr. Rest in the village, 1876—1899), etc.

From 1878, after marrying the much younger Mikhail Lobach-Zhuchenko, she lived in her husband's places of service in various parts of the Russian Empire: in the Northern Caucasus (Stavropol), and 1885–1893 in the Kiev Governorate (Boguslav, from 1887 - Khokhitva), where she proceeded with her work on Ukrainian folklore and a dictionary. At the beginning of the 1900s Mariya Vilinska restored her contact with Ukrainian publishers. Later, the Lobach-Zhuchenko family settled in the Russian city of Nalchik, Terek region, living there until Maria's death on 10 August 1907.

== Family ==
Vilinska was the wife of Ukrainian ethnographer Opanas Markovych and of Russian officer Mikhail Lobach-Zhuchenko, the mother of Russian publicist Bohdan Markovych, the cousin of Russian literary critic Dmitry Pisarev, the older sister of Russian writer Dmitry Vilinsky, and the aunt of Ukrainian diplomat Oleksandr Vilinskyi.

== Vovchok's Folk Stories ==
Vovchok published several collections of short stories over her career. Vovchok published her first collection in 1858 in St. Petersburg entitled Narodni opovidannia (Folk Stories). This collection was published by P. Kulish, who had published two of her stories the year prior. Five of the stories in her first volume were about serfdom and contained anti-serfdom sentiment. In 1859, in Russian, she published a collection of folk storied called Stories from the Folk Life of Russia. She published "Instytutka" in the same year. In 1862, Vovchok published her second volume of folk stories in Ukrainian and she published a third in 1865. These collections of folk stories were Vovchok's most influential and well-known works, as well as those that contributed to Ukrainian literary culture the most.

=== Themes and Literary Style ===
Vovchok tended to write three broad categories of folk stories. She often centered serfs, free peasants, or more traditional Ukrainian fables and tales. She also usually depicted women as the protagonists of these stories. Her empathetic and emotional portrayals of serf and peasant women caught the attention of many Russian and Ukrainian readers, as well as her detailed descriptions of the effects of serfdom on women. Vovchok's focus on women is present in almost all of her stories, regardless of plot and other themes. She focused often on the domestic life of women, as well as the individual and specific difficulties they faced. Vovchok also wrote many stories about freed serfs, in which she focused more on the domestic life that was possible for members of the freed serf class. These stories often overlapped with the themes and plots that were found in other typical folk stories of the time and region. She emphasizes the joys and hardships that freed serfs could face, but she often included the caveat that no matter the hardships freed serfs face, they were much happier just being out from under the yoke of serfdom. In the few English translations of Vovchok's work, often her fables and folk songs are omitted and are therefore not well documented in the English language.

Vovchok combined poetic and folk song influences with realism in many of her stories. She often placed emphasis on her serf and peasant characters by leaving members of the aristocracy and landed gentry unnamed (referring to them as "master", "mistress", "old lady", etc.). In addition, her stories are often narrated by serf or free peasant women with an emphasis on Ukrainian vernacular. Vovchok's stories often have a rhythmic narration and many epithets, calling back to her folk song influences. In her stories about freed serfs and free Ukrainian peasants, Vovchok's plots also often leaned toward Romanticism.

=== Anti-Serfdom Themes ===
Many of Vovchok's stories containing anti-serfdom themes were published in the years before the Emancipation of the Serfs in 1861. In her stories about serfdom, Vovchok focuses on the cruelty of the nobility and the resilience of the serfs. She outlines the way that masters often treated young girls on their estates, and the attitudes of other serfs in the household who are unable or unwilling to look after each other.

==== "Odarka" (1858) from Narodni opovidannia (Folk Stories) ====
"Odarka" tells the story of Odarka, the young daughter of a serf family. Having just turned fifteen, she is requested by the landlord of the estate, a man who had "destroyed more than one girl's happiness." After she is taken to the main house, her parents and aunt hear nothing of her for a long time until she sneaks home. Odarka tells the family that she was threatened, beaten, and finally raped. Nobody in the household would help her out of fear of the master and because she was not the first girl to be used in such a way. The next day, she is collected back to the house by two servants who again emphasize their lack of agency in the matter. Instead of being taken back to the old master, Odarka and her aunt are given to the young master and his Polish wife, who was convinced to save Odarka by taking her as her servant. Vovchok also highlights the cruelty and violence that can be performed by mistresses. At the new manor, she is humiliated and forced to dance by her new mistress and the children of the other nobles. In "Odarka", although the young master's wife initially seems to help Odarka by removing her from the old master's household, she eventually turns cruel toward to girl, calling her lazy and taking pleasure in her humiliation. She likes to make her dance until she collapses and the children of nobility throw stones at her. Odarka eventually falls ill from their torment and her homesickness. She dies soon after, wishing to return home to her mother and father.

==== "Instytutka"(1859) ====
The novel was translated in English as After Finishing School and in French as Une Dame Instruite It is the story of a Ukrainian serf maidservant to a cruel mistress who came back home from a finishing school.

===== Plot =====
"Instytutka" follows Ustyna, an orphan serf, who serves on the estate of an older woman. When the lady's granddaughter returns from studying in Kyiv, she is taken on as a personal servant for the young woman. The new addition to the household has even more hatred for the servants than her grandmother, ordering them around and punishing them for any perceived slight. Referred to throughout the story as "the young lady," she sees her education as useless and is focused on marrying a wealthy gentleman with a large estate. Despite her many suitors, she ends up falling in love with a local doctor with only a small estate. Although she is distressed by the doctor's lack of wealth, she agrees to marry him. Her grandmother promises that she will give her estate to her granddaughter and stay back to take care of it while the young lady goes away to her husband's small estate. Ustyna, the servant girl, is taken with them. While the husband has some compassion for serfs, he is ultimately overpowered by his wife and is not willing or able to shield them from her cruelties. At the new estate, Ustyna encounters other members of the household: Granny, the old housekeeper; Nazar, the driver; and Katrya, the cook and Nazar's wife. Ustyna eventually courts and falls in love with Prokip, another serf on the estate. Katrya is forced to try to earn the mistress' favor during the day and take care of her sick baby at night, eventually working herself so hard that her baby dies. Distraught by this, she is no longer useful to the mistress in the house and is sent out to the fields where she dies. A new cook is brought onto the estate from Moscow who caters to the young lady's whims. The young woman's grandmother dies. The young masters are expecting a child and in the middle of their announcement celebration, Prokip takes Ustyna to the young man and asks for permission to marry her. He agrees as does the young woman after she is encouraged by her party guests. The young woman is even crueler to Ustyna after she and Prokip are married. One day, when Ustyna, Prokip, and Granny are picking apples, Granny gives some to some children. The young woman catches her and accuses her of stealing. She starts pushing and hitting Granny, and Prokip grabs her wrist to stop her. She then accuses Prokip of attacking her and forces him into conscription. Ustyna takes this opportunity to leave the estate with Prokip, and they are able to rent a house in another town. There, they live in relative freedom, having occasional contact with Nazar and news of Granny. Eventually, the military must march out. Ustyna lived in the town for the next seven years, waiting for Prokip to come back, but she never hears from him again.

== Responses and criticism ==
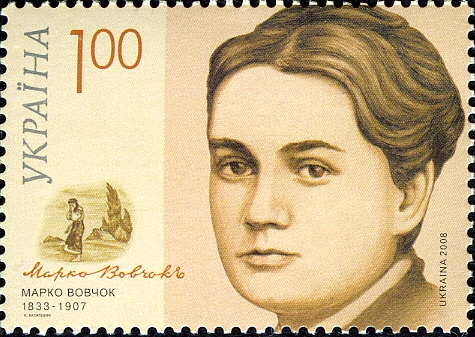
Ukrainian post stamp dedicated to Marko Vovchok

=== Response in Ukraine ===
Vovchok's first volume of folk stories was published by the already established fellow Ukrainian author and literary critic P. Kulish. Kulish believed that Vovchok would have a great career as a leader in Ukrainian literature and praised her for her mastery and poetic ability within the Ukrainian language. This praise was echoed by Ivan Franko. Taras Shevchenko praised her for her depictions of Ukrainian serfdom, dedicating one of his poems to her and calling her a "prophet". In the poem, "A Dream" (or "To Marko Vovchok"), Shevchenko writes about the future generations of freed Ukrainian serfs, themes that were consistent with Vovchok's works. Vovchok's own story, "Instytutka," which she wrote in 1859, was dedicated to Shevchenko and contained some of her most powerful anti-serfdom sentiment. Shevchenko compared her writing to that of George Sand.

=== Response Outside of Ukraine ===
Vovhock was not only praised by her fellow Ukrainians. Ivan Turgenev, one of the most popular and influential writers in Russia at the time praised her work for its content and writing style. Turgenev wanted to widen her audience, as she was already very popular in Ukraine, and translated many of her stories into Russian, in conjunction with Vovchok's own translations. Many critics praised Vovchok's truthful and realistic depiction of serfs and peasants, as well as the critiques she leveled against landlords and the landed gentry. Although many of her contemporaries in Russia received her work positively, there were criticisms from those who viewed her work as too sensational. Some critics thought that she was putting too much emphasis on the dark tones of her stories and that she was deliberately attempting to sway to audience into a particular view about serfdom. The influential Russian critic Nikolay Dobrolyubov criticized Vovchok for her attempts at establishing a literary culture in the Ukrainian language while also using her stories in his own writings as examples of the fortitude of peasants. This designation of the Ukrainian language as a "peasant dialect" was echoed in many other critiques of the time.

Vovchok's stories were well-known in other neighboring Slavic countries. An accomplished translator herself, Vovchok translated many of her stories into French which were then circulated throughout Europe. Her children's story "Marusia" was required reading in many French schools and was circulated widely throughout Europe. It was translated into German and English from her own French translation. Turgenev shared the Russian translation of her stories in Europe to other writers, such as Alexander Herzen, who expressed interest in Vovchok and her work. However, her works did not receive much attention in England as there were few English translations ever made.

== English translations ==
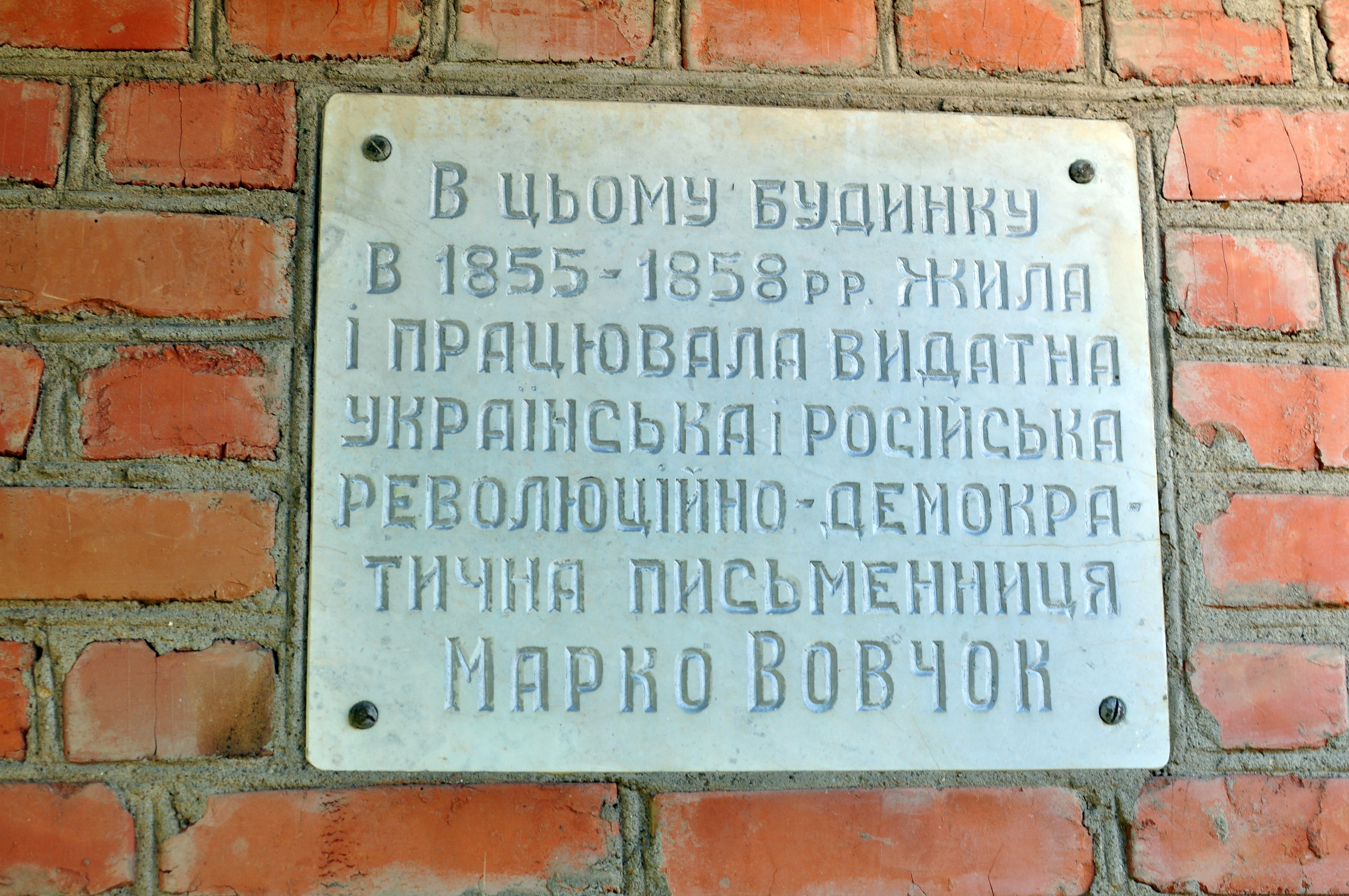
Commemorative plaque dedicated to Marko Vovchok in Nemyriv.

- P.J. Stahl [from the legend by Marko Vovchok]. Maroussia, A Russian Legend. Translated from the French by Belle Tevis Speed // National repository Vol. 8, Cincinnati: Hitchcock and Walden. 1880. pp.: 39-50, 146-156, 230-240, 329-338 (abridged)
  - (reprinted) P.J. Stahl [from the legend by Marko Vovchok]. Maroussia, A Russian Legend. Translated from the French by Belle Tevis Speed // Stories of Patriotism and Devotion. For Young People. Translated from the French by Belle Tevis Speed. Cincinnati: Walden & Showe; Toronto: Wm. Briggs. 1883. 325 pp. (abridged)
- P.J. Stahl [from the legend by Marko Vovchok]. Maroussia. Translated from the French by Sarah Herrick Kidder. [n.p]: [n.p]. 1887. 130 p. (abridged)
- P.J. Stahl [from the legend by Marko Vovchok]. Maroussia: A Maid of Ukraine. Translated from the French by Cornelia W. Cyr. New York: Dodd, Mead & Company. 1890. 268 p. (unabridged)
- Vovchok, M., 1983. Ukrainian Folk Stories. Translated by N. Pedan-Popil. Saskatoon, Saskatchewan: Western Producer Prairie Books.
- Vovchok, M. 1982. The Cossack Girl. Translated by Mary Skrypnik. Moscow: Progress Publishers. pp 15–34.

== Sources ==
- Encyclopedia of Ukraine
- Marko Vovchok (1833—1907) (in Ukrainian)
