= Anna Borisoglebskaya =

Russian actor (1868–1939)

People's Artist Anna Borisoglebskaya
- Га́нна Борисоглі́бська
- Born: 1868; Sebezh, Russian Empire
- Died: 29 September 1939 (aged 70–71); Kyiv, Ukrainian SSR, Soviet Union
- Occupation: Actress
- Awards: People's Artist of the Ukrainian SSR

Anna Ivanivna Borisoglebskaya (Ukrainian: Га́нна Іва́нівна Борисоглі́бська; 1868 – 29 September 1939) was a Ukrainian actress and People's Artist of the Ukrainian SSR (1936).

== Early years ==
Anna Borisoglebskaya was born on 1868, in the city of Sebezh in the Vitebsk Governorate (present-day Pskov). Borisoglebskaya spent her childhood in the city of Izium in the Kharkov Governorate and received her education at the Charity Society School in Kharkov. In 1886, she took an exam to become a teacher at Kharkov University and began teaching in the village of Novoselovka in the Izyumsky Uyezd that same year.

Borisoglebskaya died on 29 September 1939, in Kyiv. She was buried in Baikove Cemetery in Kyiv, and her grave is maintained by the Ukrainian Theater Actors Union.

== Career ==
From her childhood, Borislebskaya showed interest in the theater. She stepped onto the professional stage in 1888 with invitation of Marko Kropyvnytskyi. Borislebskaya worked with Kropivnitskyi's troupe until 1902, then spent four years with Panas Saksahansky and Ivan Karpenko-Karyi's troupe. In 1906–1907, she toured with the Shchepkin and Kolesnichenko troupes. From 1907 to 1917, she worked at the stationary theater led by Mykola Sadovsky in Kyiv.

She created a gallery of stage characters in the theater: Rindichka, Teklya, Gapka, Varvara ("During the Inspection," "Until the Sun Rises, Dew Eats Eyes," "Zaydigolova," "Chmyr" by Kropyvnytskyi), Sekleta, Vustya ("Chasing Two Hares," "Oh, Grits, Don't Go..." by Starytskyi), Hanna ("Talented" by Karpenko-Karyi), Mother (in the plays "Sueta" by Karpenko-Karyi and "The Forest Song" by Lesya Ukrainka), Stekha ("Nazar Stodolya" by Shevchenko), Shkandybiha ("Limerivna" by Panas Myrnyi), Mazaylikha ("Mina Mazaylo" by Mykola Kulish).

In 1919, Borisoglebskaya became one of the founders of the First State Ukrainian Drama Theater named after T. G. Shevchenko (now in the city of Dnipro — Taras Shevchenko Dnipro Academic Ukrainian Music and Drama Theatre). From 1920 to 1925, she was in Western Ukraine, where she performed with various theater troupes, especially with Orel-Stepnyak.

From 1925 until the end of her life, she worked at the Ivan Franko Theater in Kyiv. Here she created characters in plays such as: Oryna ("97" by Kulish), Klara ("Fear" by Afanasyev), Marfa, Varvara ("Truth," "Bohdan Khmelnytsky" by Korniychuk).
