= Myriv =

Coordinates: 48.9483°N 28.8908°E

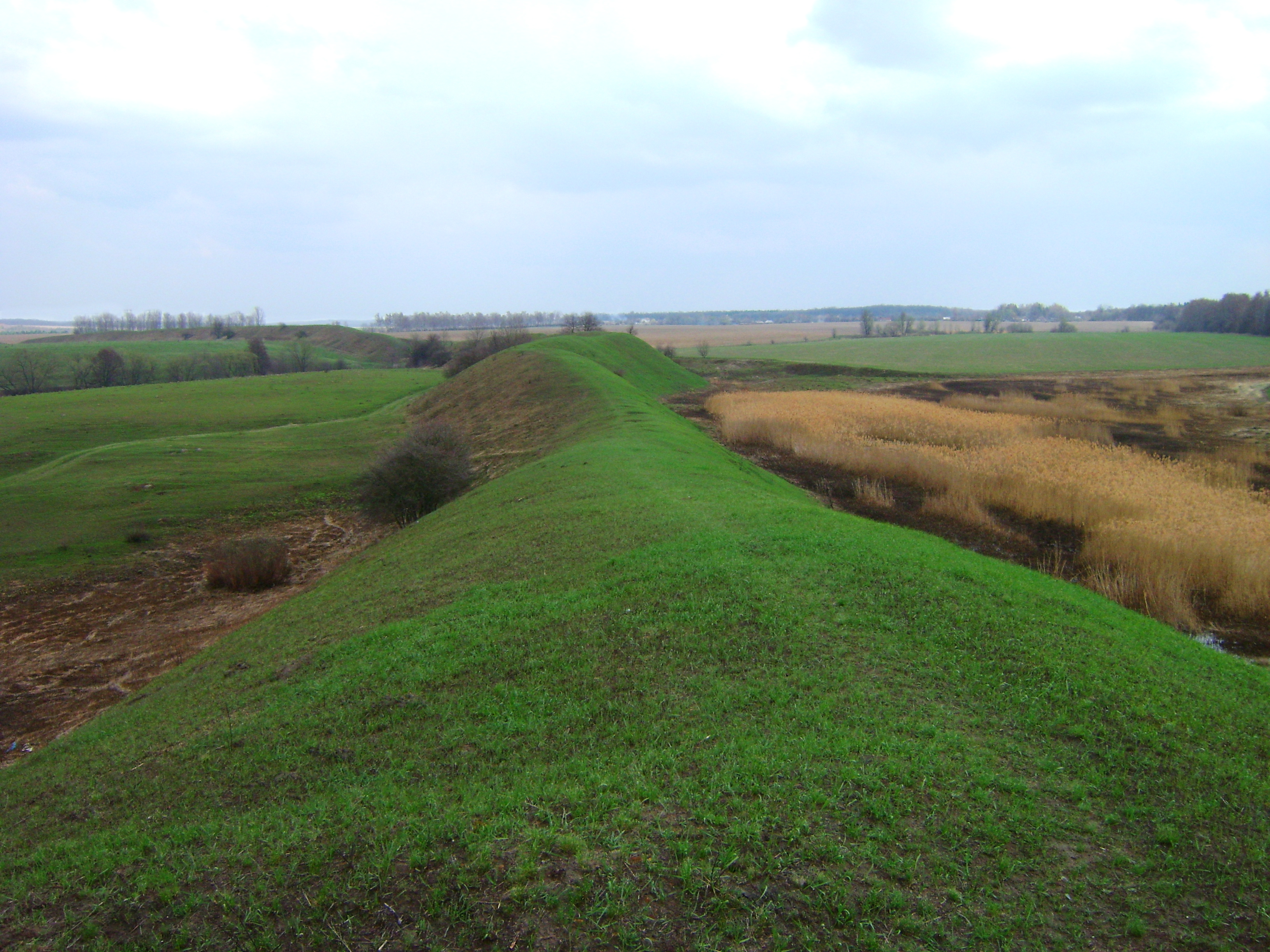
- The ramparts of Myriv
- Interactive map of Myriv

Immovable Monument of National Significance of Ukraine
- Official name: Городище (Hillfort)
- Type: Archaeology
- Reference no.: 020018-Н

Myriv (also called Nemyrivsʹke Skifsʹke Horodyshche) was an ancient (Iron Age) Scythian settlement in Ukraine. It was one of the largest Scythian cities in Ukraine between the rivers of Dniester and Dnieper.

== History ==
It was founded in 800-750 BC.

In 900-1250 AD it was a Ruthenian settlement of Kyivan Rus.

The city was destroyed during the Mongol invasion of Rus. After the Mongols left Kyivan Rus (Ukraine), the city was rebuilt elsewhere.

It was first mentioned under its modern name of Nemyriv in 1506.

In 1872, its site belonged to Count Grigory Stroganov, who resettled peasants from its land to be its owner. In 1908, his daughter, Maria Shcherbatova, visited the site.

== Description ==
The settlement covers an area of over 100 hectares, making it the largest Scythian site in Ukraine. It was surrounded by a moat and a rampart of 9 hectares.

According to archaeological studies conducted in the site, the inhabitants of Myriv belonged to the Chernoles culture of the Iron Age.
