= Nemyriv =

City in Vinnytsia Oblast, Ukraine

Nemyriv Немирів
- City
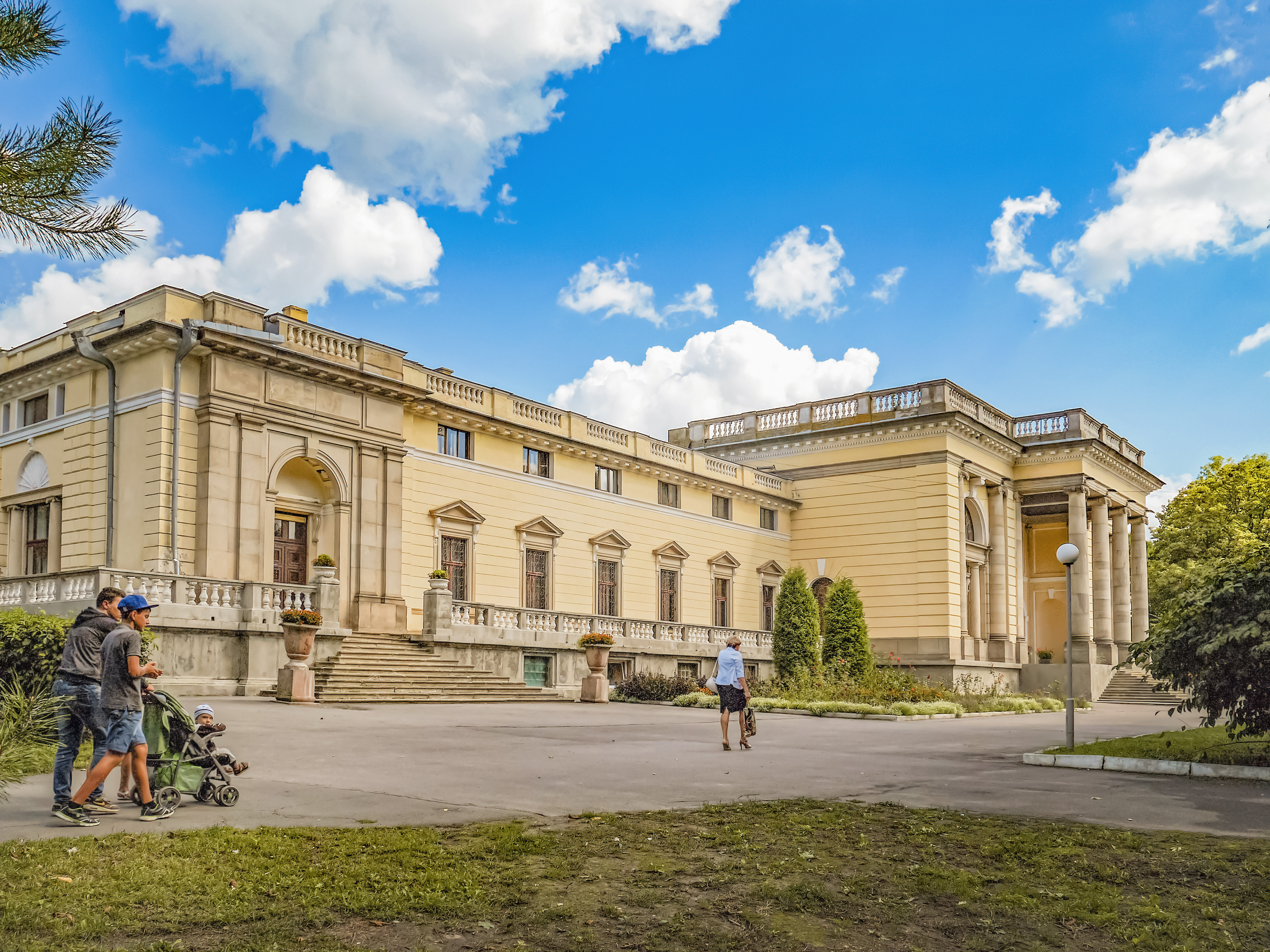
- Scherbatova Palace

- Flag Coat of arms
- Nickname: Peace Island City
- Location of Nemyriv Nemyriv (Ukraine)
- Coordinates: 48°58′N 28°51′E
- Country: Ukraine
- Oblast: Vinnytsia Oblast
- Raion: Vinnytsia Raion
- Hromada: Nemyriv urban hromada
- First mentioned: 1506
- Magdeburg rights: 1581
- City Status: 28 August 1985

Area
  - Total: 10.923 km^{2} (4.217 sq mi)

Population (2022)
  - Total: 11,421
  - Density: 1,045.6/km^{2} (2,708.1/sq mi)
- Postal code: 22800-22805
- Area code: +380 4331
- Website: nemyriv-mrada.gov.ua

Nemyriv (Ukrainian: Немирів [neˈmɪr⁽ʲ⁾iu̯]; Polish: Niemirów) is a historic city in Vinnytsia Oblast (province) in Ukraine, located in the historical region of Podolia. It was the administrative center of former Nemyriv Raion (district). Population: 11,421 (2022 estimate).

Nemyriv is one of the oldest cities in Vinnytsia Oblast, Ukraine. It was founded by Prince Nemyr in 1390. It is a minor industrial center.

The distiller company that produces Ukrainian Nemiroff (Russian spelling) vodka is located in Nemyriv.

The town's tourist attractions include a late 19th-century palace (which belonged to the House of Potocki) and a park complex.

== History ==
Historical affiliations

Grand Duchy of Lithuania 1506–1569
Polish–Lithuanian Commonwealth 1569–1672
Ottoman Empire 1672–1699
Polish–Lithuanian Commonwealth 1699–1793
Russian Empire 1793–1917
Ukraine (Ukrainian People's Republic) 1917–1920
Soviet Ukraine 1920–1922
Soviet Union 1922–1991
Ukraine 1991–present

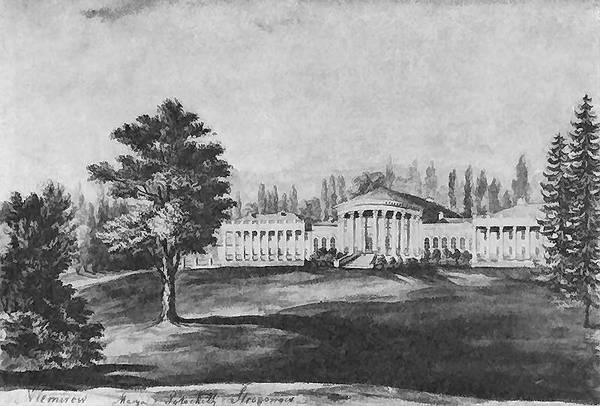
Potocki Palace in Nemyriv in the 19th century

Nemyriv was built on the site of ancient Scythian settlement Myriv, destroyed during the Mongol invasion of Rus'. The settlement was re-established at the end of the 14th century and the first written mention of the city under its modern name in 1506.

Nemyriv ultimately derives from the Slavic given name Niemir. It was a private town of Poland, owned by the families of Zbaraski and Potocki. Polish King Stanisław August Poniatowski visited the Potocki Palace.

Notable events of Cossack wars took place in the town through 17th century and the city was captured by Andrii Abazyn between 1702 and 1704.

In 1737, an abortive congress was held in Nemyriv, aimed at the conclusion of peace between the emperors of Russia, Austria-Hungary, and Ottoman Turkey, and bringing an end to the Russo-Turkish War of 1735–1739.

=== Jewish history of the city ===
Before World War II, Nemyriv had a large Jewish community. During the Khmelnytsky Uprising a massacre of Jews took place in Nemyriv. The town fell to the Cossacks on 10 June 1648, and the non-Jewish townspeople betrayed the Jews to the Cossacks. The massacre was significant enough to Polish-Lithuanian Jewry that the Council of Four Lands marked the Jewish date of the massacre, 20 Sivan, as a day of remembrance for all the dead from the Khmelnytsky Uprising. The Hasidic Rabbi Jacob Joseph of Polonne was appointed as rabbi in Nemyriv after he left Rashkov, during the 3rd quarter of the 18th century. By the 19th century it had become one of the centers of Breslov Hasidism, being the birthplace and home of Nathan of Breslov ("Reb Noson"), the foremost disciple and scribe of rebbe Nachman of Breslov. After Nachman's death in 1810, Reb Noson moved to Bratslav to disseminate and publish his teachings from there. The city acted as a center of Jewish studies and linked with several Rabbi, such as Yom-Tov Lipmann Heller and Jehiel Michel ben Eliezer. Yom-Tov Lipmann Heller once chief Rabbi of Vienna and Prague was the Chief Rabbi of Nemyriv from 1631 to 1634.

By September 1941, the Germans kept the Jews of the city prisoners in a ghetto, where they were put to work, constructing the road from Nemyriv to Haisyn. On November 24, 1941, an Einsatzgruppen massacred 2,680 Jews in pits in the Polish cemetery. On June 26, 1942, the ghetto was liquidated. The Jews were driven into the synagogue, where 200 to 300 young and strong men and women were selected and sent to a labor camp. The rest, perhaps as many as 500, were shot behind the Polish cemetery in pits that had been dug in advance.

The victims were buried in mass pits. Today, a dedicated Holocaust memorial stands at the New Jewish Cemetery in Nemyriv. The Ukrainian inscription commemorates the Jews of Podolia, Bukovina, and Bessarabia who were tortured and murdered by the fascists in the Nemyriv region between 1941 and 1943.

== Gallery ==
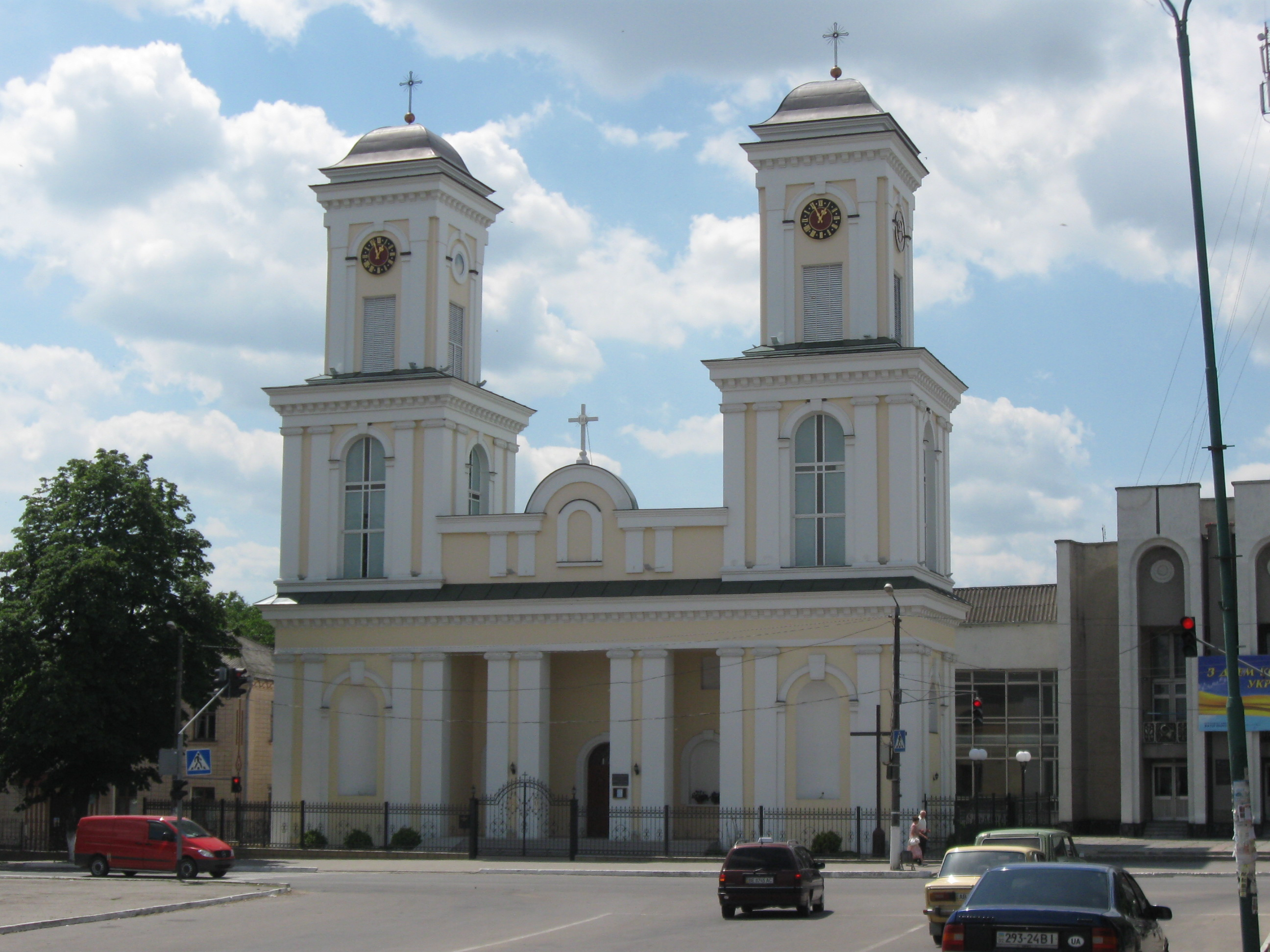
St. Joseph Catholic Church

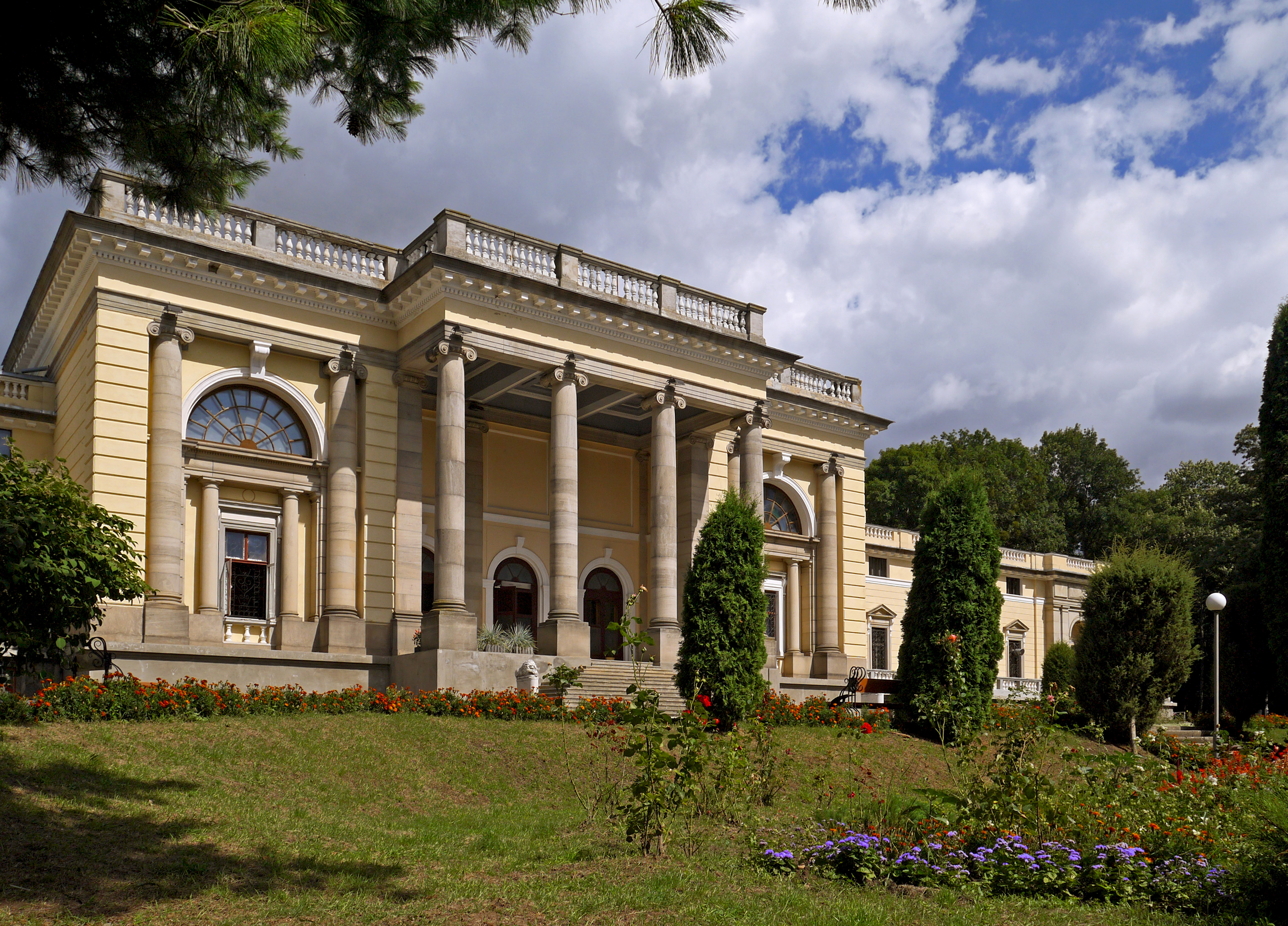
Scherbatova Palace in Nemyriv

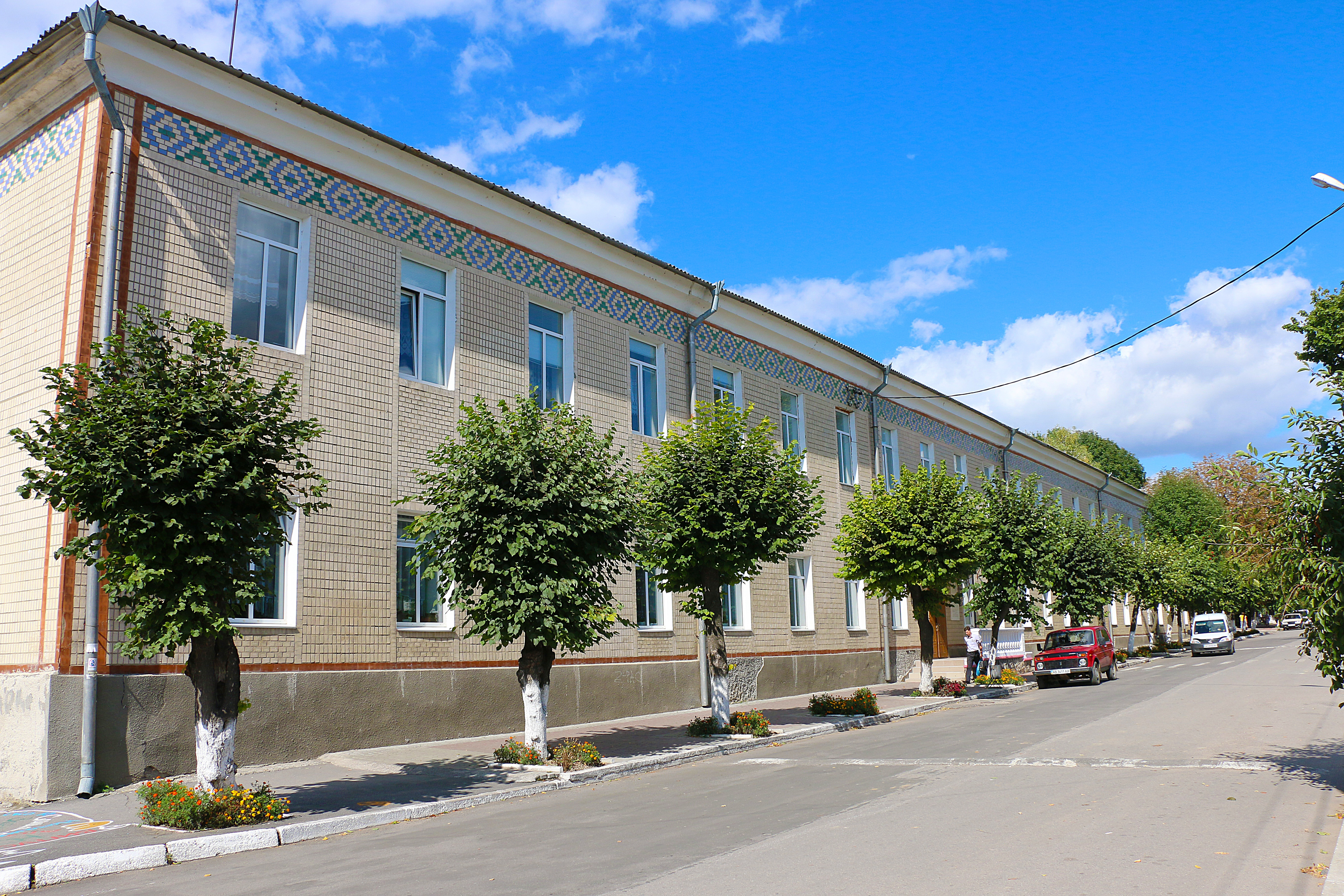
Nemyriv gymnasium

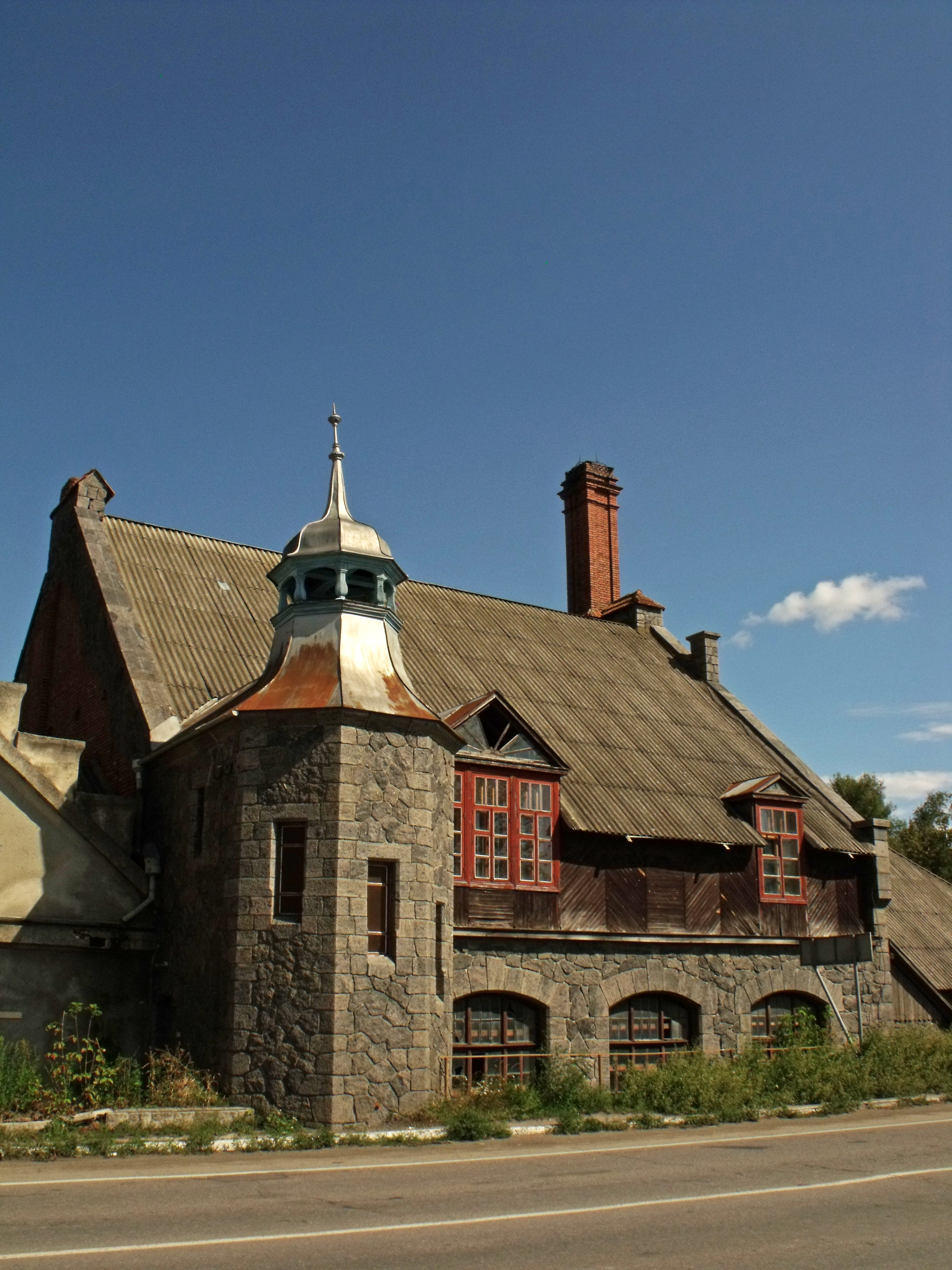
Old mill

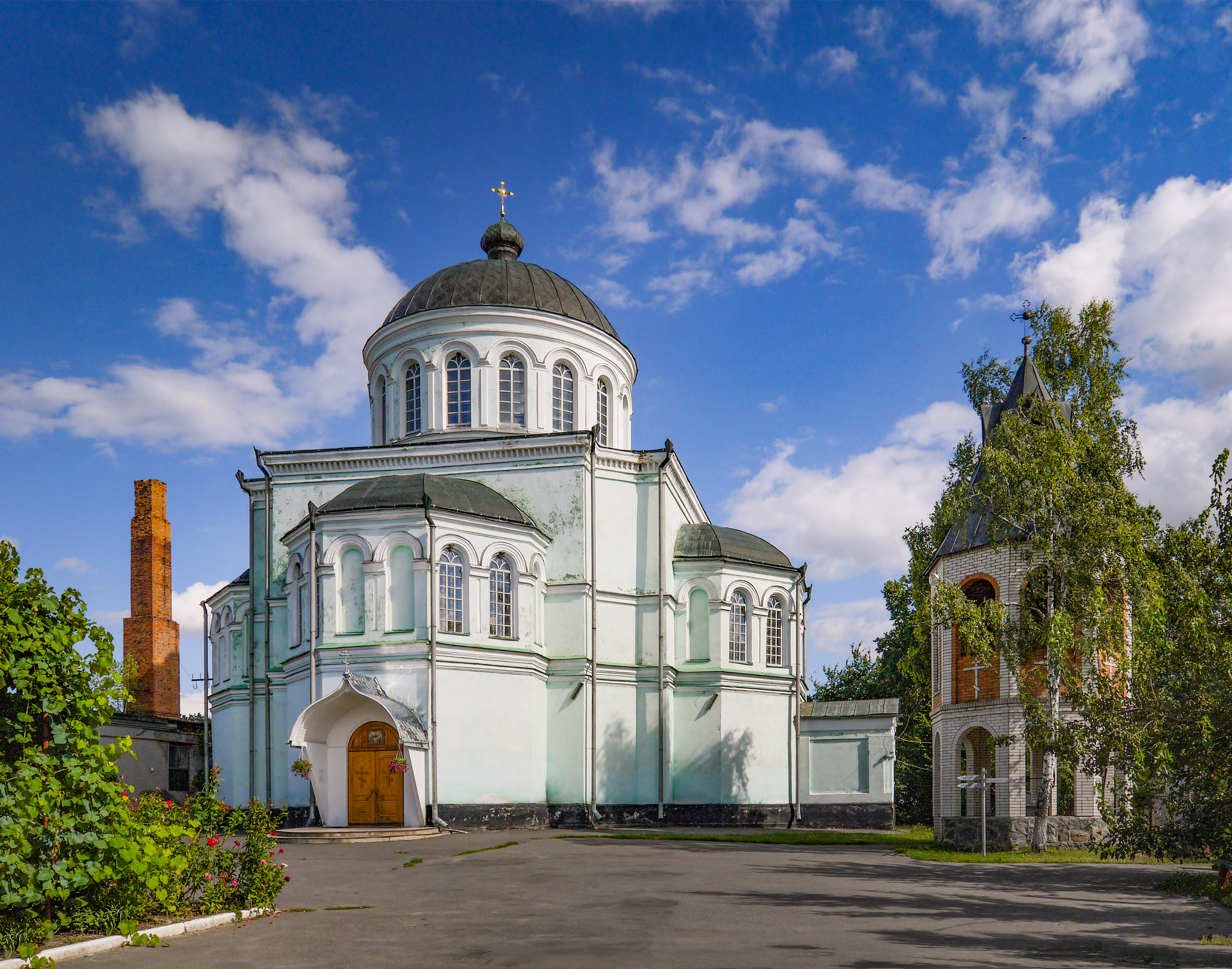
Nicholas monastery

== Notable people ==
- Nathan of Breslov, rabbi
- Theodosius Dobzhansky, geneticist
- Liubov Hakkebush, stage actress, teacher and translator.
- Mordechai Namir, Israeli politician
- Nikolay Nekrasov, poet
- Ida Rhodes (birth name Hadassah Itzkowitz), mathematician, was born in a Jewish village between Nemyriv and Tulchyn.
- Yosyf Semashko, Uniate and Orthodox hierarch
- Marko Vovchok, writer
