= Liubov Hakkebush =

Ukrainian stage actress and translator

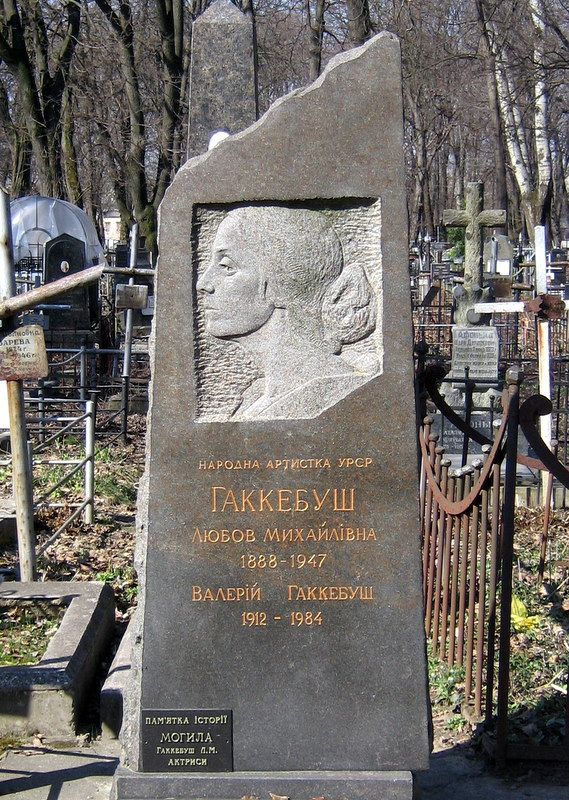
L.Gakkebush's gravestone on the Lukjanovsky cemetery in Kyiv

Liubov Mykhailivna Hakkebush (26 September 1888 – 28 May 1947) was a Ukrainian stage actress, teacher, and translator. People's Artist of the Ukrainian SSR (1943). She appeared in over 80 leading and supporting roles, including the most well-known roles of Lady Macbeth in William Shakespeare’s Macbeth and Fru Alving in Ibsen's Ghosts.

== Early life and education ==
Liubov Hakkebush was born on 26 September 1888 in Nemyriv, Russian Empire. She studied at the Moscow Kamerny Theater and appeared in amateur productions staged by the Kobzar Ukrainian club in Moscow.

== Career ==
Hakkebush debuted in 1917 on the stage of Ukrainian People’s Theater in Kyiv in the role of Miss (Autumn by Oleksandr Oles). In 1919-1921, she played at the Shevchenko First Theater of the Ukrainian Soviet Republic in Kyiv and in 1921-1922 at the Second Theater of the Ukrainian SSR named after Franko in Vinnytsya.

Hakkebush worked at the Berezil Theater from 1922 to 1926. In 1926, together with her husband Vasyl Vasylko Hakkebush moved to Odessa. From 1926 to 1928, she worked at the Ukrainian Drama Theater of Odessa. In 1928, Hakkebush and Vasylko moved to Kharkiv, where Hakkebush’s husband became the artistic director of the Chervonozavodsk Ukrainian drama theater. Hakkebush worked at Kharkiv Chervonozavodsk Ukrainian drama theater until 1933.

In 1933-1935 Hakkebush worked at Donetsk Ukrainian Music Drama Theater and from 1935, at Kharkiv Ukrainian Drama Theater named after T. Shevchenko. In 1938-1941 Hakkebush worked at Odessa Theater named after the October Revolution.

During the World War II she joined the troupe of the Shevchenko Kharkiv Ukrainian Theater in evacuation (1941-1944). She was awarded a title of People's Artist of the Ukrainian SSR in 1943.

Besides acting Hakkebush also taught acting at the theaters, the music and drama institutes of Kyiv Lysenko Music and Drama Institute (1922–6), Odessa (1926–8), and Kharkiv (1929–33), and the Kyiv Institute of Theater Arts (1944–7).

After 1944 Hakkebush settled in Kyiv and focused on translation. She is the author of translations into Ukrainian of Moliere, Gorky ("The Bourgeois"), Trenyov, Afinogenov and Romashov.

Hakkebush sheltered artist Ivan Kavaleridze in her apartment in Kyiv after the film studio evicted him from his office apartment accusing him of his stay under German occupation.

Liubov Hakkebush died on 28 May 1947 in Kyiv.

In 1970, a granite memorial plaque was installed on the facade of the house where Lyubov Gakkebush lived in 1938-47 on 17, Velyka Zhytomyska Street in Kyiv.
