= List of ambassadors to Moldova =

Enke

This is a list of ambassadors to Moldova. Note that some ambassadors are responsible for more than one country while others are directly accredited to Chișinău.

== Current ambassadors to Moldova ==
Sending country	Presentation of the credentials	Location of resident embassy	Ambassador
Afghanistan		Kyiv, Ukraine	Wali Monawar
Albania	20 March 2025	Bucharest, Romania	Enkeleda Merkuri
Algeria	25 August 2015	Kyiv, Ukraine	Hocine Boussouara
Argentina		Bucharest, Romania	
Armenia	20 October 2020	Minsk, Belarus	Armen Gevondyan
Australia	26 March 2021	Kyiv, Ukraine	Bruce Kevin Jeffrey Edwards
Austria	7 July 2016	Chișinău, Moldova	Christine Freilinger
Azerbaijan	12 October 2016	Chișinău, Moldova	Gudsi Osmanov
Bangladesh	12 February 2021	Warsaw, Poland	Daud Ali
Belarus	21 May 2020	Chișinău, Moldova	Anatoly Kalinin
Belgium	27 November 2019	Bucharest, Romania	Philippe Benoit
Bolivia			
Bosnia and Herzegovina	21 February 2020	Budapest, Hungary	Biljana Gutic-Bjelica
Brazil	2 December 2024	Kyiv, Ukraine	Rafael de Mello Vidal
Bulgaria	19 June 2019	Chișinău, Moldova	Evgueni Stoytchev
Burundi	27 May 2026	Rome, Italy	Ernest Ndabashinze
Canada	2020	Bucharest, Romania	Annick Goulet
China	25 August 2015	Chișinău, Moldova	Zhang Yinghong
Croatia	26 March 2021	Bucharest, Romania	Marija Kapitanović
Cuba	2018	Kyiv, Ukraine	Natasha Dias Aguilera
Cyprus			
Czechia	14 April 2021	Chișinău, Moldova	Stanislav Kázecký
Denmark	12 December 2018	Bucharest, Romania	Søren Jensen
Ecuador		Moscow, Russia	
Egypt		Bucharest, Romania	
Ethiopia	12 February 2021	Bucharest, Romania	Alemayehu Tegenu
Estonia	21 February 2020	Kyiv, Ukraine	Ingrid Kressel Vinciguerra
European Union		Chișinău, Moldova	
Finland		Kyiv, Ukraine	
France		Chișinău, Moldova	
Georgia		Bucharest, Romania	
Germany		Chișinău, Moldova	
Ghana		Moscow, Russia	
Greece		Kyiv, Ukraine	
Guatemala			
Guinea		Moscow, Russia	
Holy See		Bucharest, Romania	
Hungary		Chișinău, Moldova	
Iceland			
India	12 February 2021	Bucharest, Romania	Rahul Shrivastava
Indonesia		Bucharest, Romania	
Iran		Kyiv, Ukraine	
Ireland	21 February 2020	Bucharest, Romania	
Israel		Jerusalem, Israel	
Italy	14 April 2021	Chișinău, Moldova	Lorenzo Tomassoni
Japan	21 February 2020	Kyiv, Ukraine	Katayama Yoshihiro
Jordan		Bucharest, Romania	
Kazakhstan	28 April 2022	Moldova	Almat Aidarbekov
Kuwait	29 September 2017	Bucharest, Romania	Talal Al-Hajeri
Kyrgyzstan	12 December 2018	Kyiv, Ukraine	Zhusupbek Sharipov
Latvia	18 April 2019	Kyiv, Ukraine	Uldis Mikuts
Lebanon		Bucharest, Romania	
Libya			
Lithuania	24 September 2018	Chișinău, Moldova	Kęstutis Kudzmanas
Madagascar			
Malaysia		Bucharest, Romania	
Malta		Warsaw, Poland	
Mexico		Athens, Greece	
Mongolia	1 October 2017	Bucharest, Romania	Dashjamts Batsaikhan
Montenegro		Podgorica, Montenegro	Željko Radulović
Morocco		Bucharest, Romania	Faouz El Achchabi
Netherlands		Chișinău, Moldova	Fred Duijn
New Zealand	October 2016		Gregory Andrews
North Korea			
North Macedonia		Bucharest, Romania	
Norway	26 March 2021	Bucharest, Romania	Siri Barry
Oman		Moscow, Russia	
Pakistan	12 February 2021	Bucharest, Romania	Zafar Iqbal
Panama		Warsaw, Poland	
Peru		Bucharest, Romania	
Philippines		Budapest, Hungary	
Poland	2017	Chișinău, Moldova	Bartłomiej Zdaniuk
Portugal		Bucharest, Romania	
Qatar		Bucharest, Romania	
Romania	24 May 2016	Chișinău, Moldova	Daniel Ioniță
Russia	4 November 2017	Chișinău, Moldova	Oleg Vasnetsov
Serbia	26 March 2020	Kyiv, Ukraine	Stefan Tomašević
Slovakia	N/A	Bucharest, Romania	Dušan Dacho
Slovenia	14 April 2021	Bucharest, Romania	Lea Stančič
South Africa	N/A	Kyiv, Ukraine	A. J. Groenewald
South Korea	N/A	Kyiv, Ukraine	Kwon Ki Chang
Sovereign Military Order of Malta		Vienna, Austria	
Spain		Bucharest, Romania	
Sri Lanka	12 February 2021	Moscow, Russia	Durage Lamawansa
Sudan		Bucharest, Romania	
Sweden		Chișinău, Moldova	
Switzerland		Kyiv, Ukraine	
Syria			
Thailand			
Tunisia		Ankara, Turkey	
Turkey	15 July 2018	Chișinău, Moldova	Gürol Sökmensüer
Turkmenistan	2019	Kyiv, Ukraine	Kakajan Saparaliyev
Uganda	18 April 2019	Moscow, Russia	Olwa Johnson Agara
Ukraine	21 February 2020	Chișinău, Moldova	Marko Shevcenko
United Arab Emirates		Bucharest, Romania	
United Kingdom		Chișinău, Moldova	
United States	2 November 2018	Chișinău, Moldova	Dereck J. Hogan
Uzbekistan			
Vietnam	18 May 2018	Kyiv, Ukraine	Nguyen Anh Tuan
Yemen			
Zambia	18 April 2019		Shadreck Luwita

== See also ==
- Foreign relations of Moldova
- List of diplomatic missions of Moldova
- List of diplomatic missions in Moldova
