= Vinciguerra =

Vinciguerra (pronounced [vintʃiˈɡwɛrra]) is an Italian surname, literally translating to 'war-winner'. People with the surname include:

- Andreas Vinciguerra (born 1981), Swedish tennis player
- Decio Vinciguerra (1856–1934), Italian physician and ichthyologist
- Francesca Vinciguerra (1900–1985), known as Frances Winwar, Italian-American biographer, translator, and fiction writer
- Ingrid Kressel Vinciguerra (born 1973), Estonian diplomat
- Manlio Vinciguerra (born 1976), Italian scientist and researcher
- Thomas Vinciguerra (1963–2021), American writer
- Vincenzo Vinciguerra (born 1949), Italian neo-fascist
- William Rejchtman Vinciguerra (born 2007), Swedish tennis player

People bearing Vinciguerra as a given name include:

- Vinciguerra d'Aragona (fl. 14th century), Italian nobleman

== See also ==
- Vinciguerria, a genus of lightfishes named for Decio Vinciguerra
- Vinciguerra's lipinia and Vinciguerra's writhing skink, two species of skink named for Decio Vinciguerra
- 154991 Vinciguerra, a minor planet
- Vinciquerra, a misspelling of the surname
