= Austria–Moldova relations =

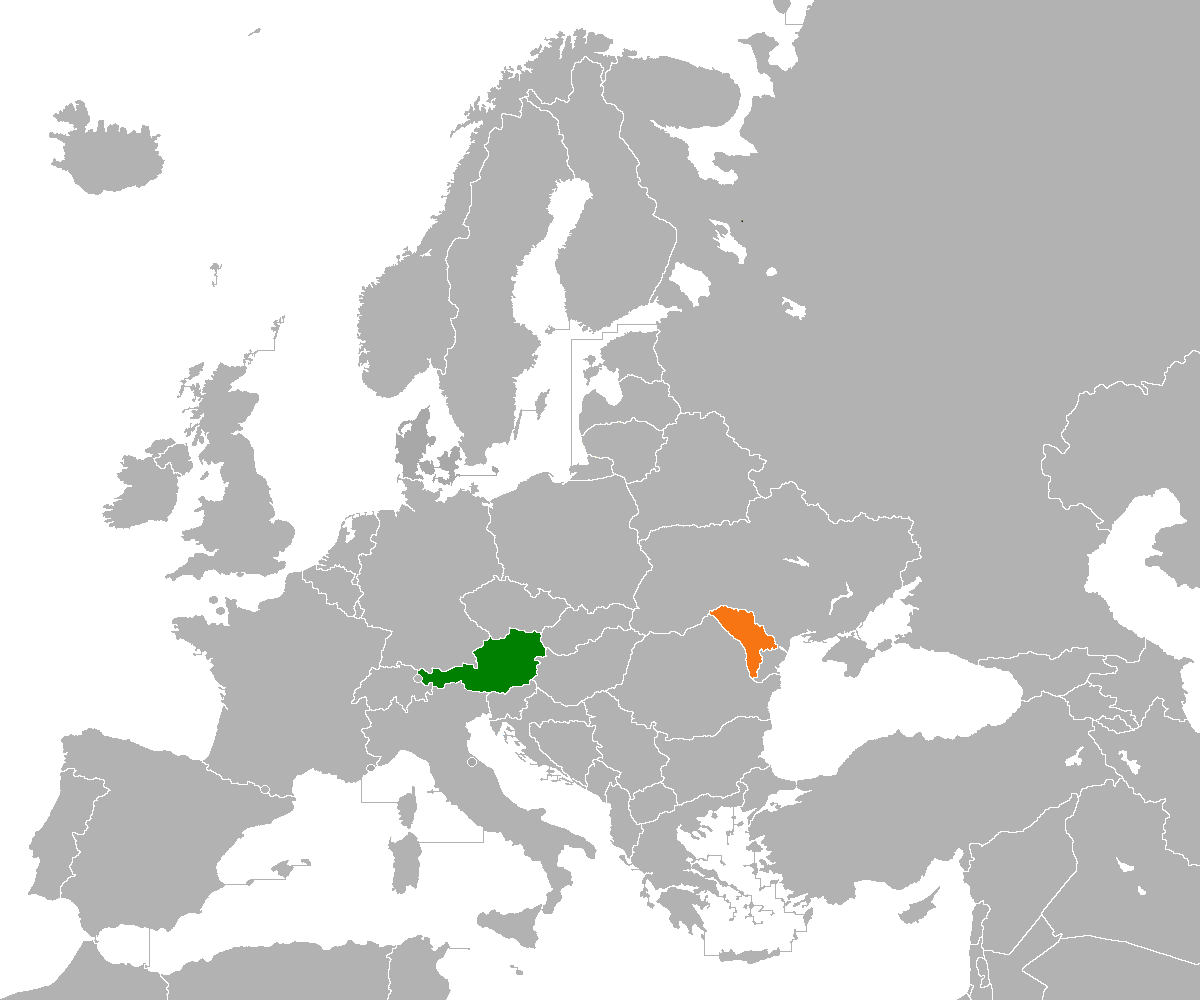

- Austria: Moldova

Austria–Moldova relations are the bilateral relations between Austria and Moldova. Both countries established the diplomatic relations on 25 March 1992. Austria is represented in Moldova through its embassy in Chișinău. Moldova has an embassy in Vienna. Austria supports Accession of Moldova to the EU.

== High level visits ==
In 1996, the President of Moldova, Mircea Snegur, visited Austria. In 1997, Petru Lucinschi, President of Moldova, participated in Salzburg at the Economical Summit of central and eastern Europe. In 1999, Petru Lucinschi met with Benita Ferrero-Waldner, State Secretary to the Austrian Federal Ministry of Foreign Affairs. He said that there were bright prospects for Moldova and Austria to expand their bilateral mutually beneficial cooperation, and spoke up for more active Austrian investment in privatized Moldovan enterprises and for creating the legal framework to broaden the bilateral interaction.

In 2003, Vladimir Voronin, President of Moldova, participated at the 10th meeting of the heads of states from Central Europe in Salzburg, Austria, at a meeting that gave leaders from countries across the continent the chance to exchange ideas on an equal footing. In July 2007, Austrian State Secretary Hans Winkler met the Moldovan Deputy Foreign Minister, and stated that Moldova's course of reform was also in Austria's Interest.

In January 2008, Vladimir Voronin met the director general for external economic relations at the Austrian Federal Economy and Labour Ministry Johann Sachs on a visit to Moldova. They discussed the recent successful meeting of the Moldovan-Austrian intergovernmental commission, and possibilities of developing Moldovan-Austrian trade and cooperation in renewable energy, agriculture and tourism. They noted that official data show that Moldova's exports to Austria went up by 50% and Austria's exports to Moldova by 80% in the first nine months of 2007.

== Treaties and policy statements ==
Austria and Moldova have agreed on various treaties covering subject such as bilateral foreign trade relations, transport, promotion and protection of Investments and avoidance of double taxation.

In July 2000, Benita Ferrero-Waldner, minister of foreign affairs of Austria, expressed optimism about negotiations to define the Transnistrian legal status based on political stability in Moldova and its territorial integrity. In April 2006, Ursula Plassnik, foreign minister of Austria, said that Moldova is a neighbour and a partner of the community of E.U. values. Austria saluted progress in strengthening the macroeconomic situation, improving human rights and reducing corruption. Although recognizing Moldova's aspirations for entry into the E.U., she noted that this would take time. In October 2008, at the signing of an Austro-Moldovan agreement on development cooperation, Foreign Minister Ursula Plassnik said "Austria is a reliable friend and partner of Moldova." The intergovernmental agreement is designed for Moldova's long-term social, ecological and economic development and the establishment of cooperation and development relations with Austria.

== Trade and investment ==
In 2005 the total volume of the trade with Austria was US$33.56 million, growing steadily. Austrian companies active in Moldova include Austrian Airlines, Raiffeisen Zentralbank, which advised the Moldovan government on privatization of Moldtelecom and the GRAWE insurance company, one of the leading insurance companies in Moldova.

== Resident diplomatic missions ==
- Austria has an embassy in Chișinău.
- Moldova has an embassy in Vienna.
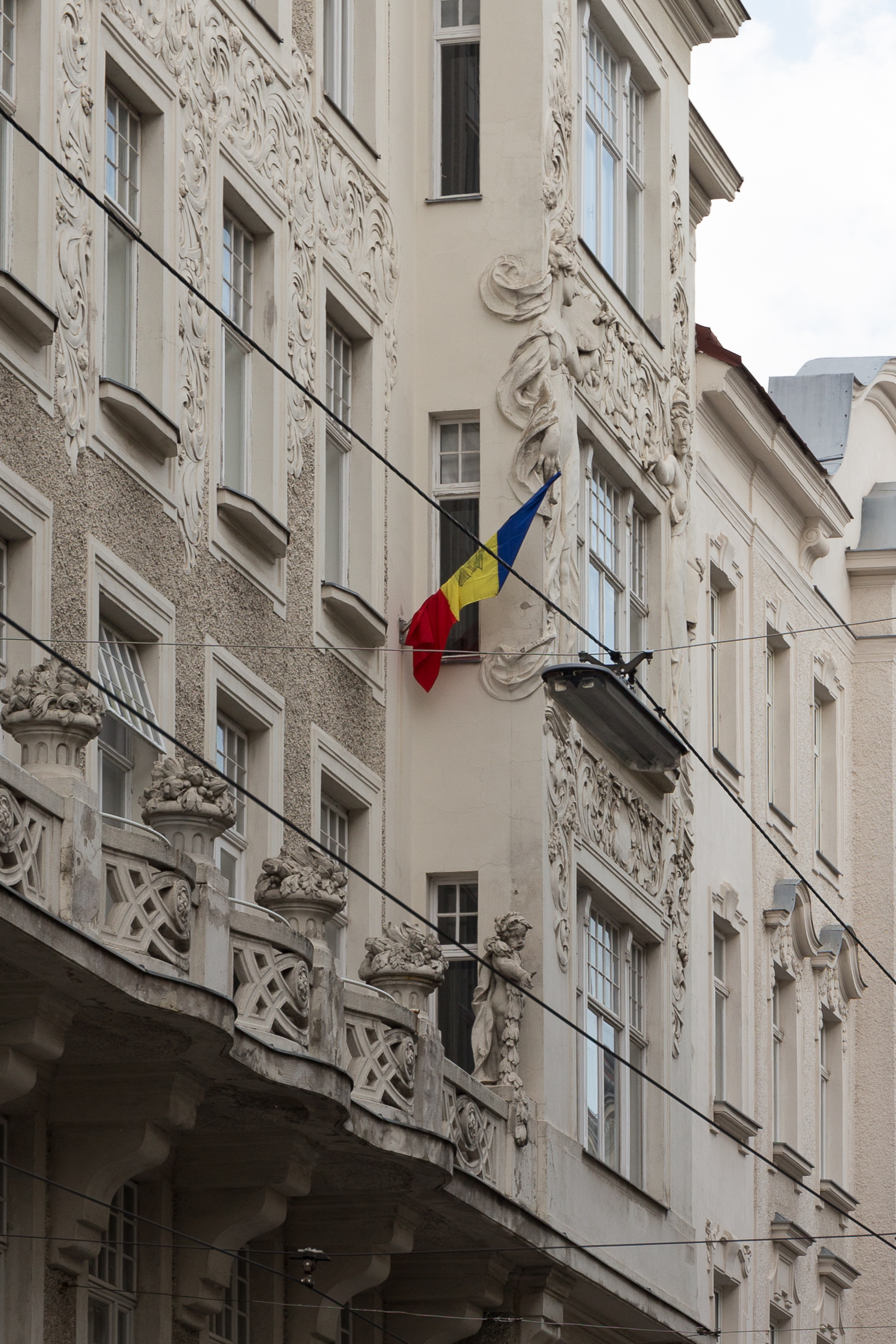
Embassy of Moldova in Vienna

== See also ==
- Foreign relations of Austria
- Foreign relations of Moldova
- Moldova-EU relations
  - Accession of Moldova to the EU
