= Foreign relations of Moldova =

After achieving independence from the Soviet Union, the Republic of Moldova established relations with other European countries. A course for European Union integration and neutrality define the country's foreign policy guidelines.

In 1995, the country became the first post-Soviet state admitted to the Council of Europe. In addition to its participation in NATO's Partnership for Peace program, Moldova is a member state of the United Nations, the Organization for Security and Co-operation in Europe (OSCE), the North Atlantic Cooperation Council, the World Trade Organization, the International Monetary Fund, the World Bank, the Francophonie and the European Bank for Reconstruction and Development.

In 2005, Moldova and EU established an action plan that sought to improve the collaboration between the two neighboring structures. After the Transnistria War, Moldova sought a peaceful resolution to the Transnistria conflict by working with Romania, Ukraine, and Russia, calling for international mediation, and cooperating with the OSCE and UN fact-finding and observer missions.

== Overview ==
=== List ===
List of countries which Moldova maintains diplomatic relations with:

| # | Country | Date |
|---|---|---|
| 1 | Romania | 27 August 1991 |
| 2 | Hungary | 16 January 1992 |
| 3 | United Kingdom | 17 January 1992 |
| 4 | Denmark | 20 January 1992 |
| 5 | China | 30 January 1992 |
| 6 | Mongolia | 30 January 1992 |
| 7 | North Korea | 30 January 1992 |
| 8 | South Korea | 31 January 1992 |
| 9 | Spain | 31 January 1992 |
| 10 | Turkey | 3 February 1992 |
| 11 | Mexico | 4 February 1992 |
| 12 | Bulgaria | 5 February 1992 |
| 13 | Egypt | 13 February 1992 |
| 14 | United States | 18 February 1992 |
| 15 | Canada | 20 February 1992 |
| 16 | Cyprus | 21 February 1992 |
| 17 | Finland | 21 February 1992 |
| 18 | Italy | 21 February 1992 |
| 19 | Ukraine | 10 March 1992 |
| 20 | Belgium | 11 March 1992 |
| 21 | France | 11 March 1992 |
| 22 | Japan | 16 March 1992 |
| 23 | Cuba | 17 March 1992 |
| 24 | India | 20 March 1992 |
| 25 | Austria | 25 March 1992 |
| 26 | Greece | 27 March 1992 |
| 27 | Philippines | 30 March 1992 |
| 28 | Australia | 1 April 1992 |
| 29 | Russia | 6 April 1992 |
| 30 | Guinea | 27 April 1992 |
| 31 | Germany | 30 April 1992 |
| 32 | Iran | 11 May 1992 |
| — | Holy See | 23 May 1992 |
| 33 | Azerbaijan | 29 May 1992 |
| 34 | Czech Republic | 1 June 1992 |
| 35 | Norway | 3 June 1992 |
| 36 | Vietnam | 11 June 1992 |
| 37 | Burundi | 12 June 1992 |
| 38 | Sweden | 12 June 1992 |
| 39 | South Africa | 15 June 1992 |
| 40 | Israel | 16 June 1992 |
| 41 | Luxembourg | 16 June 1992 |
| 42 | Georgia | 25 June 1992 |
| 43 | Oman | 25 June 1992 |
| 44 | Lithuania | 8 July 1992 |
| 45 | Netherlands | 10 July 1992 |
| 46 | Nigeria | 13 July 1992 |
| 47 | Poland | 14 July 1992 |
| 48 | Armenia | 18 July 1992 |
| 49 | Croatia | 28 July 1992 |
| 50 | Thailand | 5 August 1992 |
| 51 | Ghana | 28 August 1992 |
| 52 | Latvia | 1 September 1992 |
| 53 | Switzerland | 2 September 1992 |
| 54 | New Zealand | 11 September 1992 |
| 55 | Kazakhstan | 16 September 1992 |
| 56 | Turkmenistan | 5 October 1992 |
| 57 | Morocco | 8 October 1992 |
| 58 | Kyrgyzstan | 30 October 1992 |
| 59 | Estonia | 10 November 1992 |
| 60 | Belarus | 19 November 1992 |
| 61 | Sri Lanka | 27 November 1992 |
| 62 | Zimbabwe | 9 December 1992 |
| 63 | Burkina Faso | 11 December 1992 |
| 64 | Pakistan | 21 December 1992 |
| 65 | Albania | 23 December 1992 |
| 66 | Kuwait | 11 January 1993 |
| 67 | Singapore | 15 January 1993 |
| 68 | Tajikistan | 26 January 1993 |
| 69 | Portugal | 10 February 1993 |
| 70 | Indonesia | 12 February 1993 |
| 71 | Panama | 15 February 1993 |
| 72 | Slovakia | 16 February 1993 |
| 73 | Argentina | 8 March 1993 |
| 74 | Malaysia | 10 March 1993 |
| 75 | Guatemala | 6 April 1993 |
| 76 | Chile | 12 May 1993 |
| 77 | Sudan | 17 May 1993 |
| 78 | Syria | 20 May 1993 |
| 79 | Madagascar | 17 June 1993 |
| 80 | Nepal | 20 July 1993 |
| 81 | Brazil | 11 August 1993 |
| 82 | Bangladesh | 14 September 1993 |
| 83 | Zambia | 26 October 1993 |
| 84 | Slovenia | 27 October 1993 |
| 85 | Nicaragua | 8 November 1993 |
| 86 | Bosnia and Herzegovina | 18 November 1993 |
| 87 | Algeria | 12 April 1994 |
| 88 | Lebanon | 5 May 1994 |
| 89 | Iceland | 17 May 1994 |
| 90 | Uzbekistan | 23 August 1994 |
| 91 | Angola | 30 September 1994 |
| 92 | Afghanistan | 1 December 1994 |
| 93 | Libya | 9 December 1994 |
| 94 | North Macedonia | 27 January 1995 |
| 95 | Yemen | 27 January 1995 |
| 96 | Cambodia | 10 March 1995 |
| 97 | Serbia | 15 March 1995 |
| 98 | Peru | 11 August 1995 |
| 99 | United Arab Emirates | 21 December 1995 |
| 100 | Mozambique | 17 January 1996 |
| 101 | Venezuela | 25 April 1996 |
| 102 | Uruguay | 14 May 1996 |
| 103 | Malta | 3 July 1996 |
| 104 | Bolivia | 8 July 1996 |
| 105 | Jamaica | 9 July 1996 |
| 106 | Saudi Arabia | 17 July 1996 |
| 107 | Andorra | 9 October 1996 |
| 108 | Laos | 29 May 1997 |
| 109 | Qatar | 13 June 1997 |
| 110 | Jordan | 19 June 1997 |
| 111 | Colombia | 15 October 1997 |
| 112 | Ireland | 30 September 1999 |
| 113 | Costa Rica | 4 May 2000 |
| — | Sovereign Military Order of Malta | 27 June 2000 |
| 114 | Mauritius | 25 June 2001 |
| 115 | Liechtenstein | 14 August 2001 |
| 116 | Bahrain | 7 April 2004 |
| 117 | Cape Verde | 2 September 2004 |
| 118 | Mali | 27 September 2004 |
| 119 | Tunisia | 27 September 2004 |
| 120 | San Marino | 28 September 2004 |
| 121 | Brunei | 18 October 2006 |
| 122 | Montenegro | 9 March 2007 |
| 123 | Fiji | 7 December 2010 |
| 124 | Saint Vincent and the Grenadines | 29 April 2011 |
| 125 | Paraguay | 5 May 2011 |
| 126 | Monaco | 8 September 2011 |
| 127 | Ecuador | 8 November 2011 |
| 128 | Antigua and Barbuda | 18 November 2011 |
| 129 | Solomon Islands | 4 May 2012 |
| 130 | Tuvalu | 8 May 2012 |
| 131 | Maldives | 14 May 2012 |
| 132 | Mauritania | 23 May 2012 |
| 133 | Dominica | 29 May 2012 |
| 134 | Haiti | 7 June 2012 |
| 135 | Gambia | 12 June 2012 |
| 136 | Samoa | 14 June 2012 |
| 137 | Eswatini | 21 March 2013 |
| 138 | Suriname | 5 April 2013 |
| 139 | Ethiopia | 24 June 2013 |
| 140 | Guyana | 12 September 2013 |
| 141 | El Salvador | 24 September 2013 |
| 142 | Saint Kitts and Nevis | 8 September 2017 |
| 143 | Benin | 24 January 2018 |
| 144 | Cameroon | 27 March 2019 |
| 145 | Grenada | 26 June 2019 |
| 146 | Bahamas | 15 November 2019 |
| 147 | Barbados | 10 February 2020 |
| 148 | Djibouti | 9 October 2020 |
| 149 | Uganda | 23 October 2020 |
| 150 | Saint Lucia | 3 March 2021 |
| 151 | Dominican Republic | 30 March 2021 |
| 152 | Senegal | 28 April 2021 |
| 153 | Palau | 6 December 2021 |
| 154 | Kenya | 1 March 2022 |
| 155 | Belize | 3 August 2022 |
| 156 | Sierra Leone | 18 August 2022 |
| 157 | Trinidad and Tobago | 25 May 2023 |
| 158 | Rwanda | 25 January 2024 |
| 159 | Kiribati | 11 September 2024 |
| 160 | Honduras | 15 October 2025 |
| 161 | Ivory Coast | 16 December 2025 |
| 162 | Guinea-Bissau | 17 March 2026 |
| 163 | Botswana | 25 March 2026 |
| 164 | Lesotho | 27 March 2026 |
| 165 | Federated States of Micronesia | 2 April 2026 |
| 166 | Seychelles | 28 April 2026 |
| 167 | Timor-Leste | 14 May 2026 |
| 168 | Chad | 17 July 2026 |
| 169 | Iraq | 6 August 2026 |
| 170 | Togo | 21 September 2026 |
| 171 | Namibia | 22 September 2026 |

=== Relations with the European Union ===
Moldova aspires to join the European Union and is implementing its first three-year Action Plan within the framework of the European Neighbourhood Policy (ENP) of the EU.

As regards its energy policy, Moldova was an observer to the treaty establishing Energy Community from the outset (2006). Following its interest in full membership, the European Commission was mandated to carry out negotiations with Moldova in 2007. In December 2009, the Energy Community Ministerial Council decided on the accession, but made it conditional to amendment of Moldova's gas law. Moldova joined the Energy Community as a full-fledged member in March 2010.

=== Relations with NATO ===
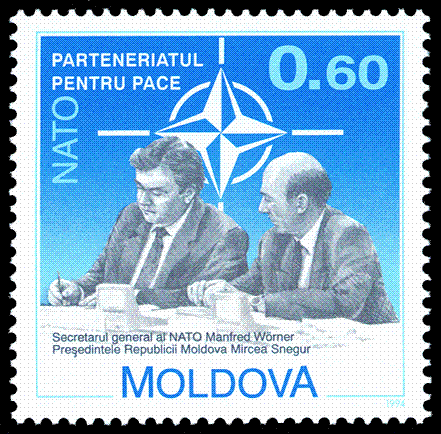
Wörner and Snegur signing PfP on 16 March 1994

NATO relations with Moldova date back to 1992, when the country joined the North Atlantic Cooperation Council. Moldova works alongside NATO allies and partner countries in a wide range of areas through the Partnership for Peace and the Euro-Atlantic Partnership Council.

=== Relations with post-Soviet states ===
The Moldovan Parliament approved the country's membership in the Commonwealth of Independent States and the CIS charter on economic union in April 1994. Moldova however has never participated in any military aspects of CIS, citing its neutral status.

In 1998, Moldova contributed to the founding of GUAM, a regional cooperation agreement made up of Georgia, Ukraine, Azerbaijan and Moldova. Although the agreement initially included a declaration of mutual defense, Moldova has since declared its disinterest in participating in any GUAM-based mutual defense initiative.

Russia continues to maintain a military presence in the Transnistrian region of Moldova, despite previous agreements with Moldova and within OSCE and CAF to withdraw its troops and ammunition.

Moldova was granted Observer Status in the Russian-led Eurasian Union in April 2017.

=== Relations with Transnistria ===
The territory of Moldova includes the separatist Transnistria region. Transnistria had a particularly large non-Moldovan population (about 60%) and broke away from Moldova less than a year after Moldova became independent at the fall of the Soviet Union. The Pridnestrovian Moldavian Republic controls main part of this region, and also the city of Bender and its surrounding localities on the west bank. The international diplomatic situation with respect to the question of Transnistria determines and is determined by Moldova's relations with Russia. Russia, Ukraine, Organization for Security and Co-operation in Europe, EU, and United States are involved at different degrees in the conflict resolution.

=== Relations with the United Kingdom ===
On 20 November 2024, Moldova and the United Kingdom signed a Defence and Security Partnership.

== Bilateral relations ==
=== Multilateral ===
| Organization | Formal Relations Began | Notes |
|---|---|---|
| Council of Europe | | Moldova joined the Council of Europe as a full member on 13 July 1995. |
| European Union | | See Moldova–European Union relations |
| NATO | | See Moldova–NATO relations |

=== Americas ===
| Country | Formal relations began | Notes |
|---|---|---|
| Chile | 12 May 1993 | Chile is accredited to Moldova from it embassy in Bucharest, Romania.; Moldova does not have an accreditation to Chile. |
| Guatemala | 6 April 1993 | Guatemala is accredited to Moldova from its embassy in Moscow, Russia.; Moldova does not have an accreditation to Guatemala. |
| Mexico | 14 January 1992 | Mexico is accredited in Moldova from its embassy in Bucharest, Romania and maintains an honorary consulate in Chișinău.; Moldova is accredited to Mexico from its embassy in Washington, D.C., United States. |
| United States | 18 February 1992 | See Moldova–United States relations The United States recognized the independence of Moldova on 25 December 1991, and opened an embassy in its capital, Chișinău, in March 1992. A trade agreement providing reciprocal most-favored-nation tariff treatment became effective in July 1992. An Overseas Private Investment Corporation agreement, which encourages U.S. private investment by providing direct loans and loan guarantees, was signed in June 1992. A bilateral investment treaty was signed in April 1993. A generalized system of preferences status was granted in August 1995, and some Eximbank coverage became available in November 1995. U.S. Secretary of State John Kerry made a visit to Moldova in December 2013 to support the former Soviet republic's pro-Western moves in the face of Russian pressure. The United States remains committed to the 5+2 format as a means to resolving the Transnistria conflict. The United States supports a comprehensive settlement that affirms Moldova's sovereignty and territorial integrity, while providing a special status for Transnistria.: Moldova has an embassy in Washington, D.C..; United States has an embassy in Chișinău.; See also: Embassy of the United States to Moldova and Embassy of Moldova, Washington, D.C. |

=== Asia ===
| Country | Formal relations began | Notes |
|---|---|---|
| Azerbaijan | 29 May 1992 | Azerbaijan has an embassy in Chișinău.; Moldova has an embassy in Baku.; Both countries are full members of BSEC, the Council of Europe, OSCE and the United Nations. |
| China | 30 January 1992 | See China–Moldova relations: China has an embassy in Chișinău.; Moldova has an embassy in Beijing. |
| India | 20 March 1993 | See India–Moldova relations: India is accredited to Moldova from its embassy in Bucharest, Romania; Moldova is accredited to India through its embassy in Baku, Azerbaijan. |
| Israel | 22 June 1992 | See Israel–Moldova relations: Israel is accredited to Moldova from its embassy in Kyiv, Ukraine.; Moldova has an embassy in Tel Aviv. |
| Kazakhstan | 16 September 1992 | Moldova has an embassy in Astana.; Kazakhstan has a consulate-general in Chișinău. |
| Turkey | 3 February 1992 | See Moldova–Turkey relations: Moldova has an embassy in Ankara and a consulate-general in Istanbul.; Turkey has an embassy in Chișinău.; Both countries are full members of BSEC.; Speaking in Comrat in August 2018 when referencing the country's allies, President Igor Dodon said "we have friends who are close to Gagauzia, and I believe to Moldova, as well, they are Russia and Turkey." |

=== Europe ===
| Country | Formal relations began | Notes |
|---|---|---|
| Albania | 23 December 1992 | See Albania–Moldova relations |
| Austria | 25 March 1992 | See Austria–Moldova relations: Austria has an embassy Chișinău.; Moldova has an embassy in Vienna. |
| Belarus | 19 November 1992 | See Belarus–Moldova relations: Diplomatic relations between Belarus and Moldova were established on 19 November 1992. That same year, an agreement on friendly relations and cooperation between the two countries was signed.; Belarus has an embassy in Chișinău.; Moldova has an embassy in Minsk.; The first official Moldovan visit to Minsk was by Petru Lucinschi in June 2000. Nicolae Timofti later visited in October 2013, July 2015 and October 2016, and was followed in July 2017 by Igor Dodon.; List of Ambassadors of Moldova in Belarus: Nicolae Dudău (1998-2001), Gheorghe Hioară (2010-2017), Victor Sorocean (2017–Present) |
| Bulgaria | 5 February 1992 | Bulgaria recognized Moldova on 28 December 1991.; Since 1992, Bulgaria has an embassy in Chișinău.; Moldova has embassy in Sofia.; Both countries are full members of the Council of Europe and of the Organization for Security and Co-operation in Europe. |
| Cyprus | 21 February 1992 | See Cyprus–Moldova relations |
| Czech Republic | 1 June 1992 | See Czech Republic–Moldova relations: Czech Republic has an embassy in Chișinău; Moldova has an embassy in Prague. |
| Denmark | 20 January 1992 | See Denmark–Moldova relations: Denmark has an embassy in Chișinău.; Moldova is accredited to Denmark from its embassy in The Hague, the Netherlands. |
| Estonia | 10 November 1992 | See Estonia–Moldova relations: Estonia has an embassy office in Chișinău.; Moldova has an embassy in Tallinn.; Both countries are full members of the Council of Europe.; Estonia is an EU member and Moldova is an EU candidate. |
| Finland | 26 February 1992 | See Finland–Moldova relations: Finland is accredited to Moldova from its embassy in Bucharest, Romania.; Moldova is accredited to Finland from its embassy in Stockholm, Sweden. |
| Georgia | 25 June 1992 | See Georgia–Moldova relations: Until 1991, both countries were part of the USSR and before 1918 part of the Russian empire.; Georgia has an embassy in Chișinău.; Moldova is accredited to Georgia from its embassy in Baku, Azerbaijan.; Georgian Ministry of Foreign Affairs about relations with Moldova |
| Germany | 30 April 1992 | See Germany–Moldova relations: Germany has an embassy in Chișinău.; Moldova has an embassy in Berlin and a consulate-general in Frankfurt. |
| Greece | 27 March 1992 | See Greece–Moldova relations: Diplomatic relations between Greece and Moldova were established 27 March 1992 after the collapse of the Soviet Union; Greece is accredited to Moldova from its embassy in Kyiv, Ukraine.; Moldova has an embassy in Athens. |
| Italy | 21 February 1992 | See Italy–Moldova relations: Italy has an embassy in Chișinău.; Moldova has an embassy in Rome and a consulate-general in Milan.; Both countries are full members of the Council of Europe. |
| Latvia | 1 September 1992 | Latvia has an embassy in Chișinău.; Moldova has an embassy in Riga. |
| Netherlands | 10 July 1993 | See Moldova–Netherlands relations: Moldova has an embassy in The Hague.; Netherlands has an embassy office in Chișinău.; Both countries are full members of the Council of Europe. |
| North Macedonia | 27 January 1995 | See Moldova–North Macedonia relations |
| Poland | 14 July 1992 | See Moldova–Poland relations: Moldova has an embassy in Warsaw.; Poland has an embassy in Chișinău.; Both countries are full members of the Council of Europe. |
| Portugal | 10 February 1993 | See Moldova–Portugal relations: Moldova has an embassy in Lisbon.; Portugal is accredited to Moldova from its embassy in Bucharest, Romania. |
| Romania | 27 August 1991 | See Moldova–Romania relations Moldova's relations with its western neighbour, Romania, have been stressed since 1994. Today's Moldova (without Transnistria) and parts of the old Bassarabia Governorate currently in Ukraine, were part of Romania during the interwar period (1918–40). Linguists generally agree that the Moldovan language is in fact identical with Romanian. However, Moldovans have been ambivalent about whether they consider themselves Romanians or Moldovans. Early signs that Romania and Moldova might unite after both countries achieved emancipation from communist rule quickly faded. Romania remains interested in Moldovan affairs, especially that country's civil conflict with the breakaway republic of Transnistria. However, the two countries have been unable to reach agreement on a basic bilateral treaty; Romania is insistent (against determined Moldovan resistance) that such a treaty would have to refer to Romania and Moldova's 'special relationship'. Beginning in 1994, the two countries enjoyed a visa-free arrangement that ended on 1 January 2007, with Romania's entry into the European Union. This prompted many Moldovan citizens to apply for Romanian citizenship.: Moldova has an embassy in Bucharest and a consulate-general in Iași. .; Romania has an embassy in Chișinău and consulates-general in Bălți and Cahul. |
| Russia | 6 April 1992 | See Moldova–Russia relations Relations between Moldova and Russia deteriorated in November 2003 over a Russian proposal for the solution of the Transnistria conflict, which Moldovan authorities refused to accept. Following the Russian invasion of Ukraine on 24 February 2022, Moldova adopted a more cautious and critical stance toward Russia, condemning the aggression and aligning more closely with the European Union.: Moldova has an embassy in Moscow.; Russia has an embassy in Chișinău. |
| Serbia | 15 March 1995 | See Moldova–Serbia relations: Moldova is accredited to Serbia from its embassy in Bucharest, Romania.; Serbia is accredited to Moldova from its embassy in Bucharest, Romania.; Moldova strongly supports Serbia's stance on Kosovo. |
| Slovenia | 27 October 1993 | See Moldova–Slovenia relations: Moldova is accredited to Slovenia from its embassy in Budapest, Hungary.; Slovenia is accredited to Moldova from its embassy in Kyiv, Ukraine; Both countries are full members of the Council of Europe and the Francophonie. |
| Spain | 31 January 1992 | See Moldova–Spain relations: Moldova has an embassy in Madrid.; Spain is accredited to Moldova from its embassy in Bucharest, Romania. |
| Sweden | 12 June 1992 | See Moldova–Sweden relations: Moldova has an embassy in Stockholm.; Sweden has an embassy in Chișinău |
| Switzerland | 2 September 1992 | See Moldova–Switzerland relations: Moldova has an embassy in Geneva.; Switzerland is accredited to Moldova from its embassy in Kyiv, Ukraine. |
| Ukraine | 10 March 1992 | See Moldova–Ukraine relations: Moldova has an embassy in Kyiv and a consulate-general in Odesa.; Ukraine has an embassy in Chișinău and a consulate in Bălți. |
| United Kingdom | 17 January 1992 | See Moldova–United Kingdom relations Foreign Secretary James Cleverly with Moldovan President Maia Sandu in Church House, May 2023. Moldova established diplomatic relations with the United Kingdom on 17 January 1992.: Moldova maintains an embassy in London.; The United Kingdom is accredited to Moldova through its embassy in Chişinău.; Both countries share common membership of the Council of Europe, the International Criminal Court, the OSCE, the United Nations, the World Health Organization, and the World Trade Organization. Bilaterally the two countries have a Development Partnership, a Double Taxation Convention, and a Strategic Partnership, Trade and Cooperation Agreement. |

== See also ==
- List of diplomatic missions in Moldova
- List of diplomatic missions of Moldova
- List of Ambassadors to Moldova

== Gallery ==
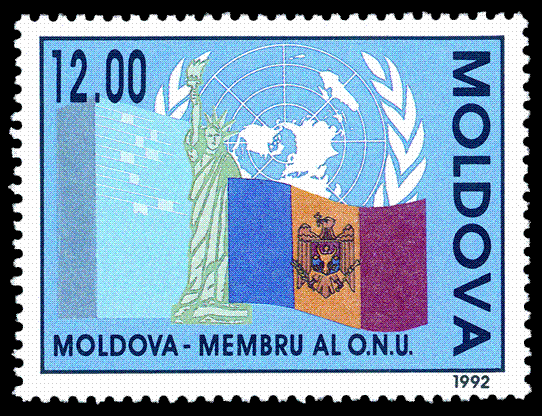
Moldovan stamp commemorating membership in the United Nations

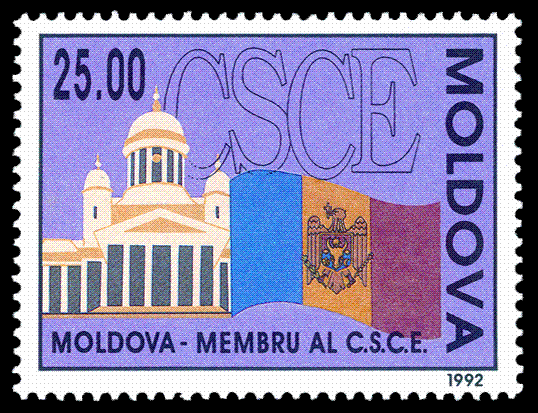
Moldovan stamp commemorating membership in the OSCE
