= Manlio Vinciguerra =

Italian academic (born 1976)

Manlio Vinciguerra (born 1976 in Catania, Italy) is a scientist specializing in epigenetics and aging research who held faculty positions at the Medical University of Varna, Bulgaria; at the International Clinical Research Center, Brno, Czech Republic; at the Liverpool John Moores University and at the University College London, United Kingdom, and at several Italian Universities

Vinciguerra received a doctorate in internal medicine in 2004, and also research training at the University of Geneva, Switzerland, and the European Molecular Biology Laboratory in Italy and in Germany (2005-2011). Vinciguerra obtained a degree in biomolecular sciences from the University of Catania, Italy, in 1999.

Vinciguerra unraveled important cellular signaling and epigenetics mechanisms involved in metabolic processes, stress and aging in the heart and in the liver, such as the PI3K/AKT/mTOR pathway, histone variants and sirtuins, using a systems biology approach in cells and rodent models. He is a member of Who's Who in Gerontology.

Vinciguerra and his team have been awarded the Varna Award 2026, with a Ribbon of the Mayor, the highest award of the municipality of Varna, Bulgaria to distinguished students, artists, and scientists.
