= Moldova–Serbia relations =

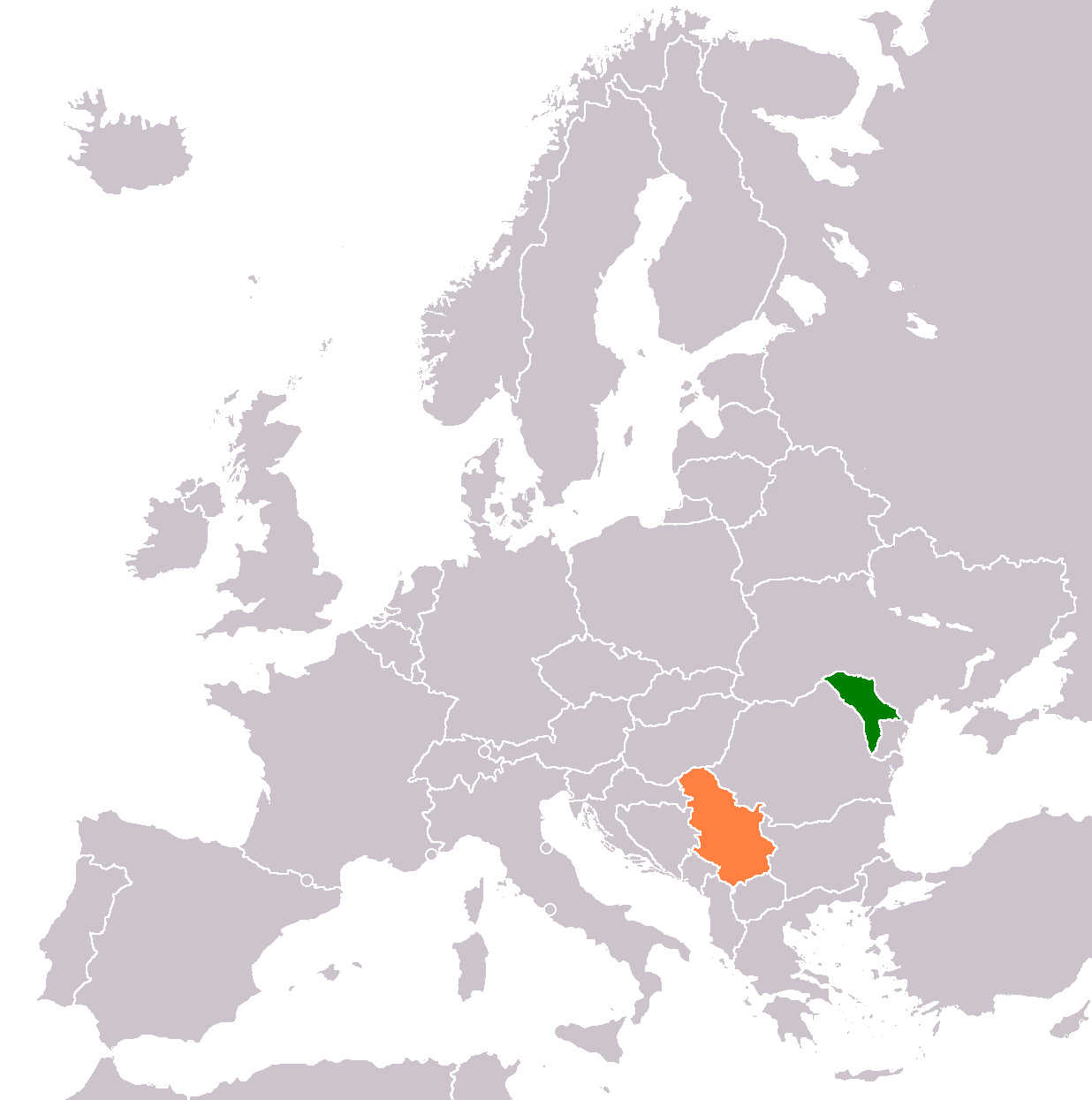

- Moldova: Serbia

Moldova and Serbia maintain diplomatic relations established between Moldova and the Federal Republic of Yugoslavia (of which Serbia is considered sole legal successor) in 1995.

== Economic relations ==
Trade between two countries amounted to nearly $54 million in 2023; Serbian merchandise exports to Moldova were standing at over $28 million; Moldova's export to Serbia were about $26 million.

== Resident diplomatic missions ==
- Moldova is represented in Serbia through its embassy in Sofia, Bulgaria.
- Serbia is represented in Moldova through its embassy in Kyiv, Ukraine.

== See also ==
- Foreign relations of Moldova
- Foreign relations of Serbia
- Soviet Union–Yugoslavia relations
