= China–Moldova relations =

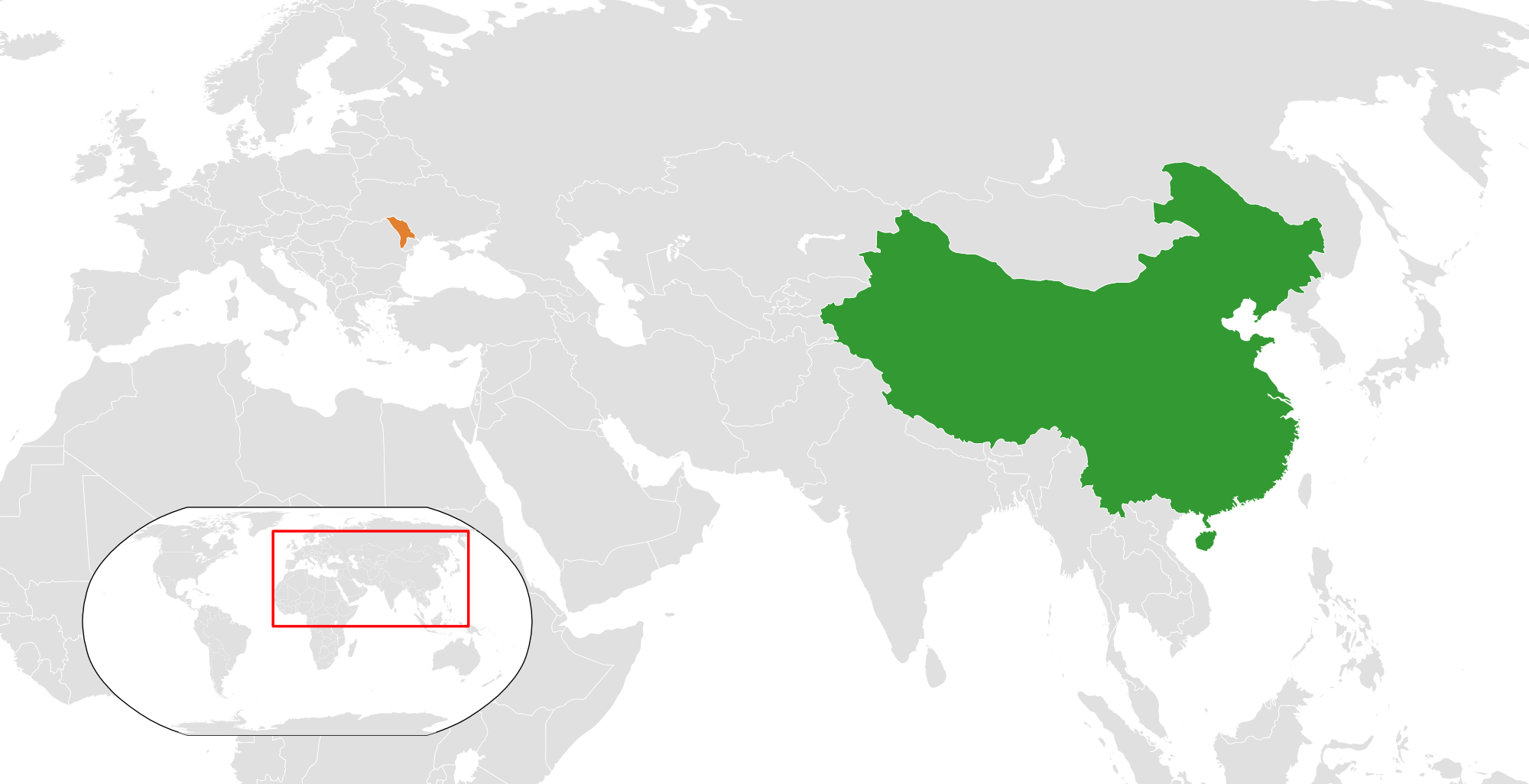

- China: Moldova

China–Moldova relations are the bilateral relationships between the People's Republic of China and the Republic of Moldova.

China recognized the independence of Moldova on Dec 27th, 1991. Bilateral relationships between China and Moldova were established in Jan 30th, 1992. Then in June, 1992, China opened the Embassy of the People's Republic of China in Chişinău while Moldova opened the Embassy of Moldova in Beijing in Mar, 1996.

Moldova joined the Belt and Road Initiative in 2013.

During the worldwide COVID-19 pandemic, China donated 150,000 doses of the Sinopharm BIBP vaccine and sold another 100,000 to Moldova. China is also currently helping train technicians from Moldova.

== Resident diplomatic missions ==
- China has an embassy in Chișinău.
- Moldova has an embassy in Beijing.

== See also ==
- Foreign relations of China
- Foreign relations of Moldova
