= Vinciquerra =

Vinciquerra is a surname, a misspelling of the Italian surname Vinciguerra. Notable people with the surname include:

- Carl Vinciquerra (1914–1997), American boxer
- Tony Vinciquerra (born 1954), American film executive
