= India–Moldova relations =

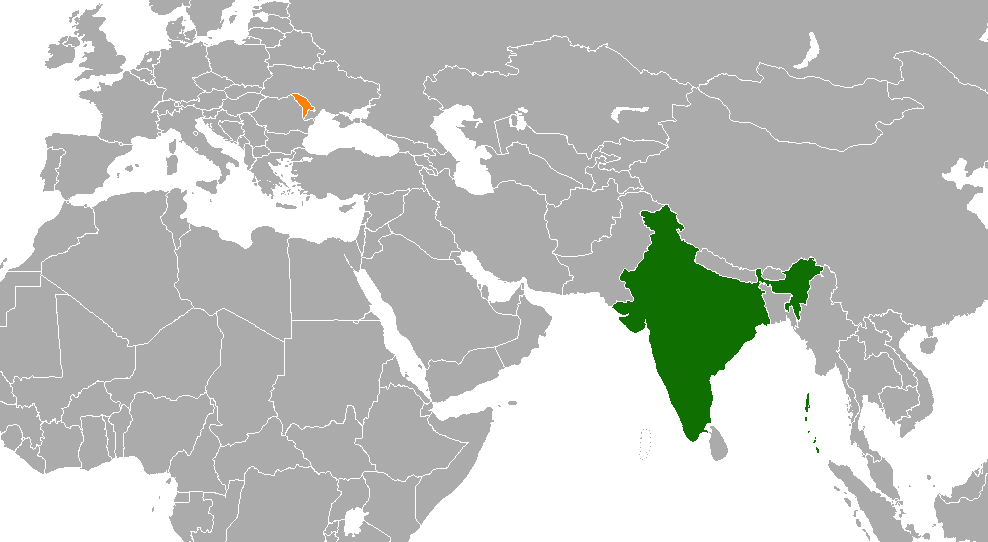

- India: Moldova

India–Moldova relations are the bilateral relations between India and Moldova. India recognized Moldova at 28 December 1991 and in the following year, both established relations.

The Indian embassy to Moldova is accredited from Bucharest, Romania; while Moldova has an embassy in New Delhi, which was opened in December 2024.

Both countries have taken steps to deepen their ties, which is still maintained in a modest level. Both countries have been found supporting each other at many international platforms like the United Nations through reciprocal support mechanism. India-Moldova bilateral trade has been rather modest. During 2012-13, bilateral trade was measured at US$9.63 mn (Exports US$8.94 mn, Imports US$0.69 mn), which increased to US$17.75 mn (Exports US$12.51 mn, Imports US$4.24 mn).

In 2015, President of India Pranab Mukherjee congratulated Moldova on the National Day of Moldova at August 27.

== Resident diplomatic missions ==
- India is accredited to Moldova from its embassy in Bucharest, Romania.
- Moldova has an embassy in New Delhi.

== See also ==
- Foreign relations of India
- Foreign relations of Moldova
