= Moldova–Turkey relations =

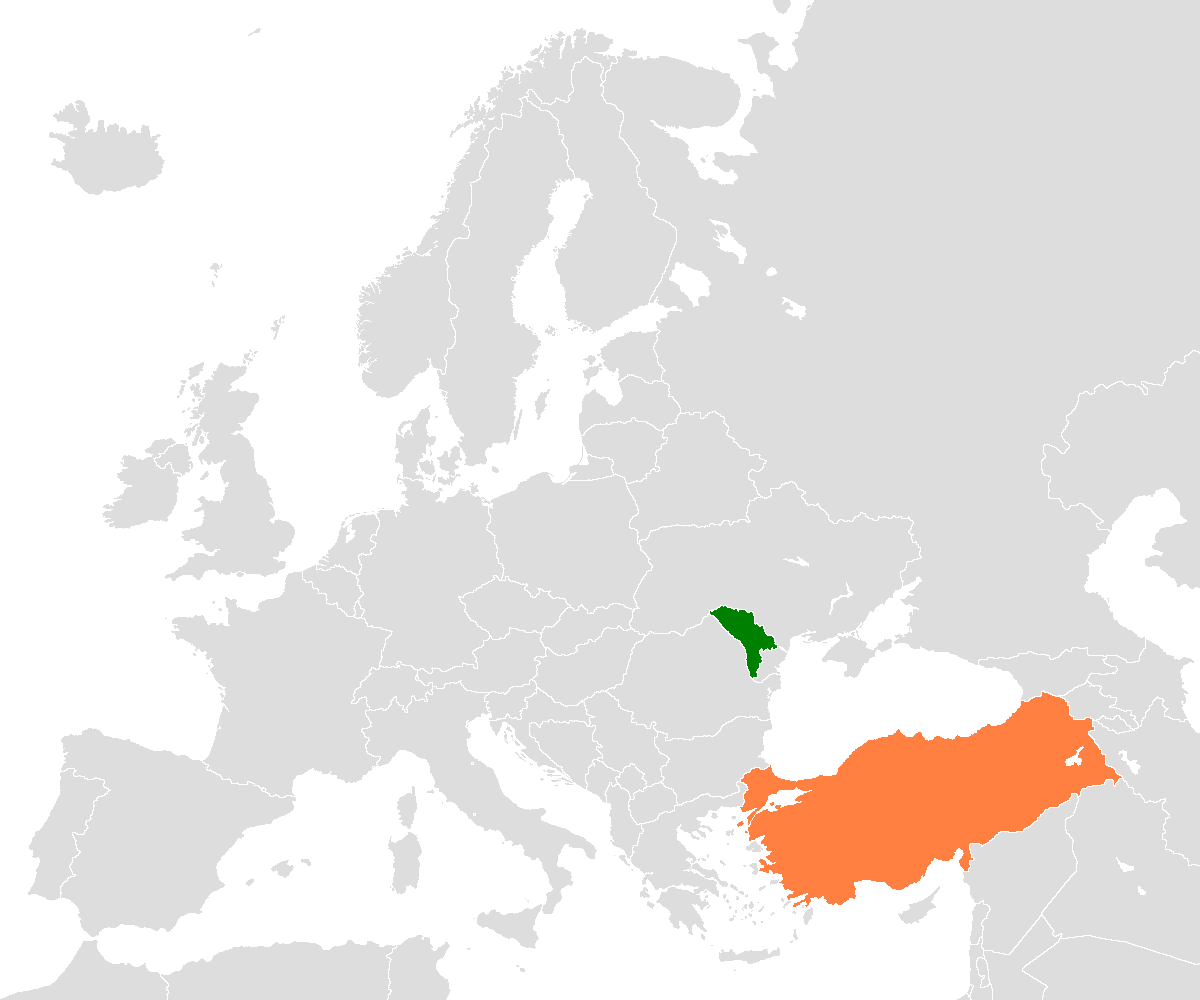

- Moldova: Turkey

Moldova–Turkey relations are the bilateral relations between Moldova and Turkey. Currently, Turkey is represented through an embassy in Chișinău and is trying to establish a consulate in Comrat. Moldova has an embassy in Ankara and a consulate in Aydın, Belek, Bursa, Istanbul, Manisa and, since 2020, Alanya. Both countries officially established their diplomatic relations on 3 February 1992 after Turkey recognised the Moldovan declaration of independence on 16 December 1991.

Since the beginning of Moldovan independence, Turkey has expressed interest regarding economic and political cooperation with the country, and today, it is one of the biggest economic and trade partners of Moldova.

Turkey has good relations with Gagauzia, an autonomous republic of Moldova. The Orthodox Christian Gagauz people is, just like the Turkish people, a Turkic people. According to Mevlüt Çavuşoğlu, the Turkish Minister of Foreign Affairs, Turkey has launched several projects on development and education in Gagauzia, with Irina Vlah, then Governor of Gagauzia, saying that Turkey "is the closest country to Gagauzia and has been helping to solve its political, social, and economic problems for 30 years".

On 7 November 2020, it was announced that a new Moldovan consulate had been opened on the Turkish city of Alanya. At the opening ceremony assisted Oleg Țulea, the Moldovan Minister of Foreign Affairs and European Integration, and Çavuşoğlu. Țulea said that this act would intensify the academic, commercial, cultural and economic relations between Moldova and Turkey and provide aid to Moldovan citizens in Turkey with diplomatic difficulties. He added that one of the priorities of the Government of Moldova was to deepen relations with Turkey. For his part, Çavuşoğlu mentioned the importance of Turkey for Moldova regarding foreign investments and tourism and that "Gagauz Turks constituted an added value" between the relations of both.

== See also ==
- Foreign relations of Moldova
- Foreign relations of Turkey
