= Georgia–Moldova relations =

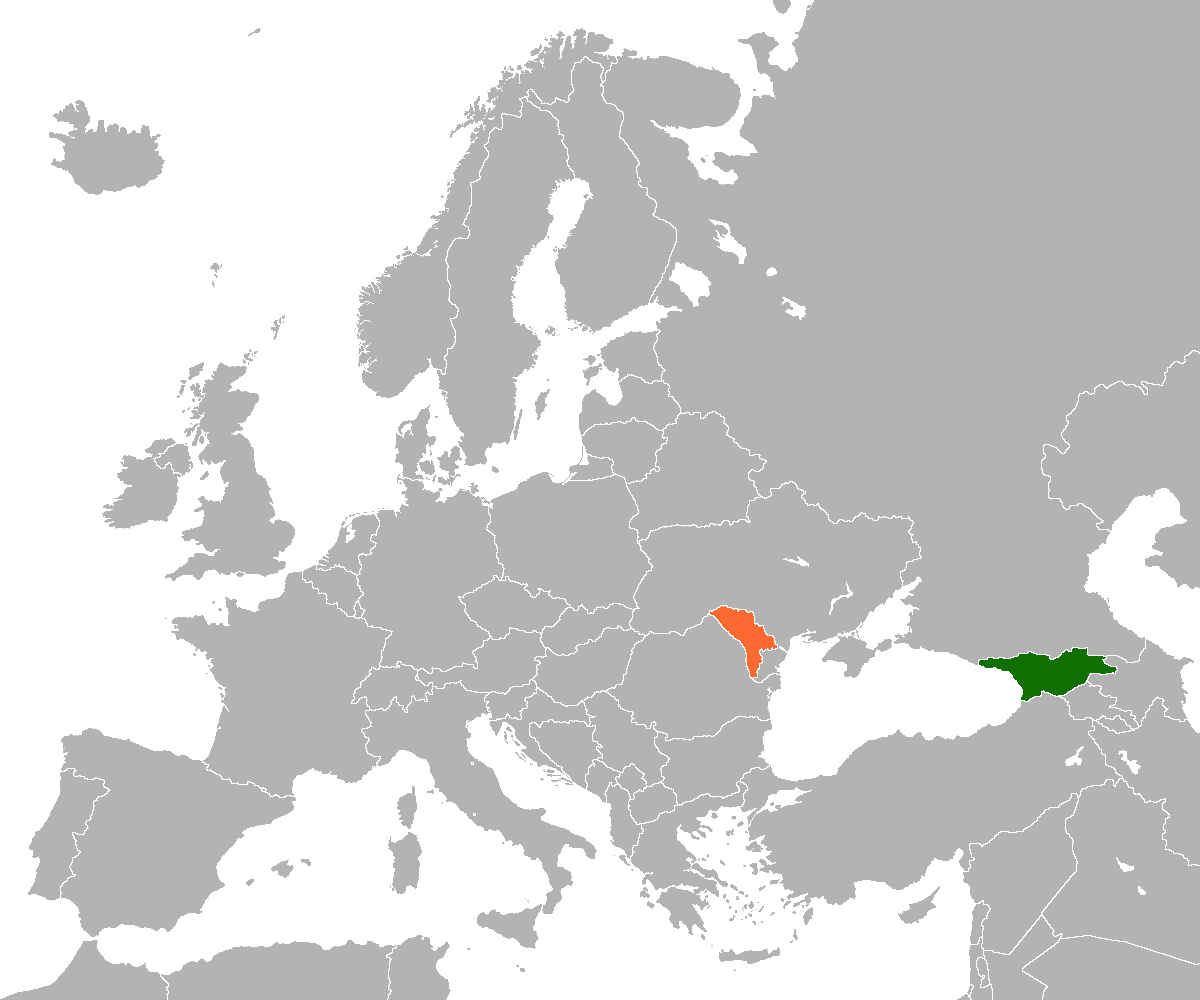

- Georgia: Moldova

Georgia–Moldova relations are the foreign relations between Georgia and Moldova, which were officially established on 25 June 1992. Both countries have separatist zones that are supported by Russia (Abkhazia and South Ossetia in Georgia, Transnistria in Moldova) and have suffered wars as a cause of conflicts with them. Additionally, Russian propaganda is present in both countries. Wine from both countries suffered a ban in Russia in 2006 despite their popularity in the country and importance on the trade of Georgia and Moldova with Russia.

Georgia does not support Transnistria's independence. In 2018, the State Minister for Reconciliation and Civic Equality of Georgia Ketevan Tsikhelashvili met with the deputy prime minister of Moldova and the Minister of Reintegration of Temporarily Occupied Territories of Ukraine and visited the security zone in Transnistria, describing Moldova as "our friend state" and condemning Russia's actions in Georgia, Moldova and Ukraine (which also has territories under Russian occupation).

On the other hand, in 2008, following the independence declarations of Abkhazia and South Ossetia, the Ministry of Foreign Affairs of Moldova Andrei Stratan stated that Moldova would not recognize their independence. This was reaffirmed in 2020 by the former President of Moldova Igor Dodon. Furthermore, in 2015, Moldova banned Abkhazian and South Ossetian officials from entering the country for 10 years as a result of their participation in demonstrations in Tiraspol celebrating the 25th anniversary of Transnistria's declaration of independence.

Georgia and Moldova, together with Ukraine, are part of the Association Trio, formed in 2021 by these countries for closer integration with the European Union (EU). These countries and Azerbaijan are also part of the GUAM Organization for Democracy and Economic Development.

== Resident diplomatic missions ==
- Georgia has an embassy in Chișinău.
- Moldova is accredited to Georgia from its embassy in Baku, Azerbaijan.
Embassy of Georgia in Chișinău

== Consulates ==
- Moldova has a consulate in Batumi located at Pirosmani street 1A

== See also ==
- Foreign relations of Georgia
- Foreign relations of Moldova
