= Moldova–Switzerland relations =

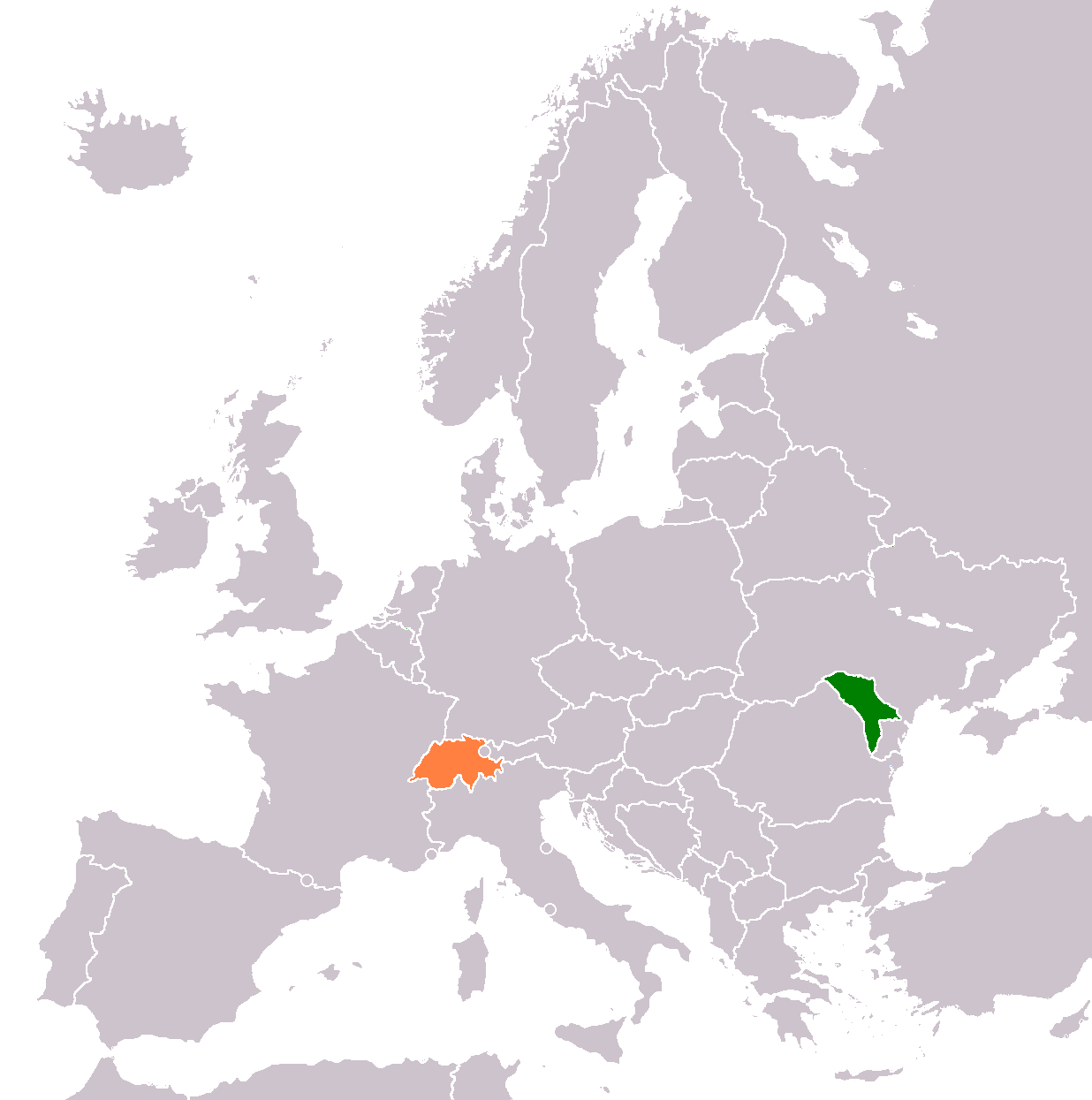

- Moldova: Switzerland

Moldova–Switzerland relations are the bilateral relations between Moldova and Switzerland. Both countries established diplomatic relations on September 2, 1992. Moldova is represented in Switzerland through its embassy to the United Nations in Geneva. Switzerland is represented in Moldova through its embassy in Kyiv (Ukraine) and an honorary consulate in Chişinău. Since 1992 various senior Moldovan officials have visited Switzerland to discuss improvements in bilateral relations. Switzerland has provided significant aid to Moldova. Both nations are members of the Council of Europe.

== Official visits and statements ==
In April 1992, the Swiss military attaché in Moscow said that Switzerland intended to establish links between the Swiss and Moldovan military institutions and assist Moldova in strengthening defense capabilities.

In January 1999, Moldovan President Petru Lucinschi visited Switzerland, and stated that progress had been made in broadening bilateral relations between the two countries.

In October 2006, Ambassador Extraordinary and Plenipotentiary of Switzerland to Moldova Christian Fessler stated that Switzerland supports Moldova's European integration efforts, and hoped for a peaceful settlement of the Transnistria conflict.

In June 2008, the Moldovan Vice-Premier and Minister of Foreign Affairs and European Integration Andrei Stratan visited Switzerland and met with senior officials to discuss improvements in bilateral relations, including visa arrangements and joint cooperation efforts in the social, tourism and education sectors. They noted plans to open an embassy of Switzerland in Chişinău.

In December 2008, Valery Ostalep, Deputy Minister of Foreign Affairs of Moldova, visited Switzerland and met with senior officials to discuss opportunities for improved economic relations.

== Agreements ==
As of 2008, Moldova and Switzerland had signed a dozen agreements, half of which were economic.

== Aid ==
In 1996, it was reported that the Swiss-American Micro-Enterprise Programme would lend money for small loans to assist Moldova's micro-enterprises. Switzerland's State Secretariat for Economic Affairs funded a project in 2005 to assist the Moldovan Ministry of Economy and Commerce in improving levels of foreign direct investment.

The Swiss Agency for Development and Cooperation (SDC) has been active in Moldova since 2000, providing humanitarian aid. The SDC gave support to the International Organization for Migration in 2001 to start a reintegration program for the victims of trafficking in women. The Lausanne-based Terre des hommes has been active in Moldova since 2005, giving support and training to authorities in protecting children at risk of parental neglect, abuse, exploitation and trafficking. The Swiss Tropical Institute has provided assistance to Moldova since 2006 in improvements in perinatal treatment.

== Economic relations ==
Switzerland is Moldova's 14th most important trading partner.

In July 2000, the president of the Swiss airline Crossair met with Moldovan President, Petru Lucinschi and expressed readiness to extend the partnership with the state-owned Air Moldova, and to take part in the privatization of the Air Moldova. The Moldovan government was also negotiating with Swiss-based Militzer & Münch about a concession to run the Moldovan National Railroad Company. Alain Benech of the Secretariat for Economy of the Switzerland Foreign Department stated in an interview that there were many opportunities for Swiss business in Moldova.

In December 2008, Moldovan entrepreneurs in Switzerland attended a forum organized by the newly formed Switzerland-Moldova Chamber of Commerce, with guest speakers Pierre-François Unger, Minister of Economy and Health of the Canton of Geneva and Moldovan Minister of Finance Marian Durleshtyanu.

== Miscellaneous ==
In June 2003, Swiss parliamentarian Ruth-Gaby Vermot-Mangold presented a report on organ trafficking to the Council of Europe, including evidence gathered in Moldova. This has prompted Swiss authorities to consider new legislation to prevent abuse of organ donations.

== See also ==
- Foreign relations of Moldova
- Foreign relations of Switzerland
