= List of diplomatic missions in Moldova =

This article lists diplomatic missions resident in the Republic of Moldova includes embassies and consulates established (in the period 1992-2026). At present, the capital city of Chişinău hosts 33 embassies. Many other countries are represented through their embassies in other regional capitals such as Bucharest, Kyiv, Sofia or Moscow.

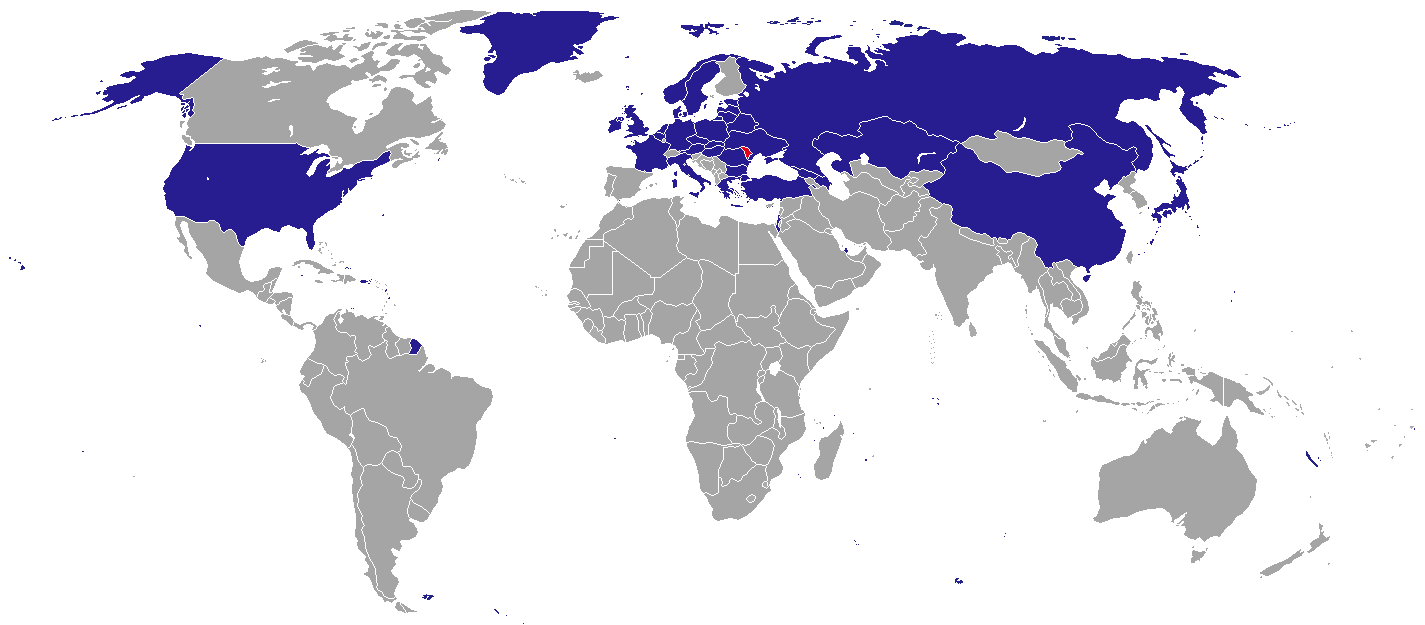
Map of diplomatic missions in Moldova

== Diplomatic missions in Chişinău ==
=== Embassies ===
1. Austria
2. Azerbaijan
3. Belarus
4. Belgium
5. Bulgaria
6. China
7. Czechia
8. Denmark
9. Estonia
10. France
11. Georgia
12. Germany
13. Greece
14. Hungary
15. Ireland
16. Israel
17. Italy
18. Japan
19. Kazakhstan
20. Latvia
21. Lithuania
22. Netherlands
23. Norway
24. Poland
25. Qatar
26. Romania
27. Russia
28. Slovakia
29. Sweden
30. Turkey
31. Ukraine
32. United Kingdom
33. United States

=== Delegations/Missions/Offices ===
1. European Union (Delegation)
2. NATO (Liaison office)
3. United Nations (Resident coordinator's office)

=== Gallery ===
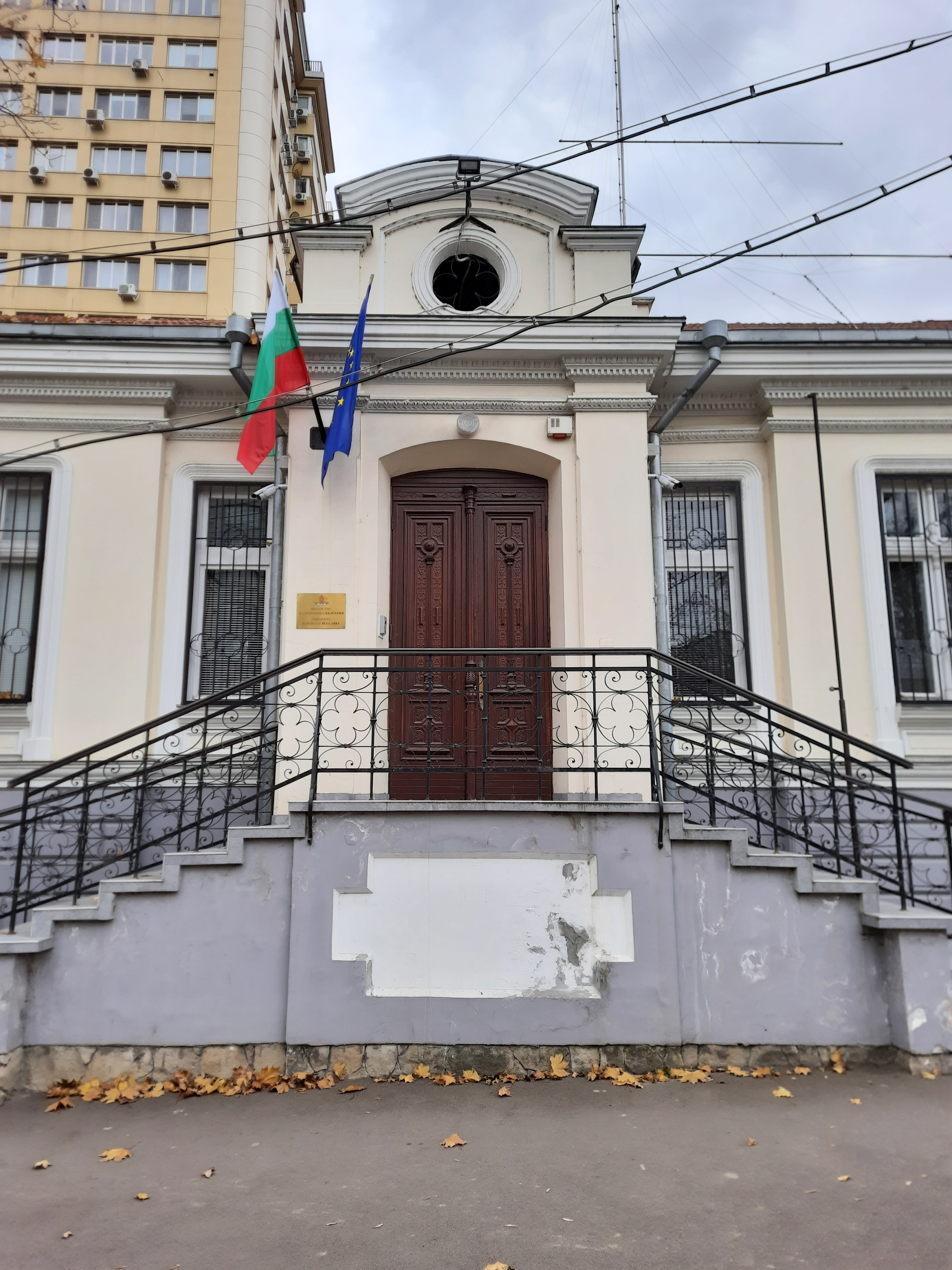
Embassy of Bulgaria

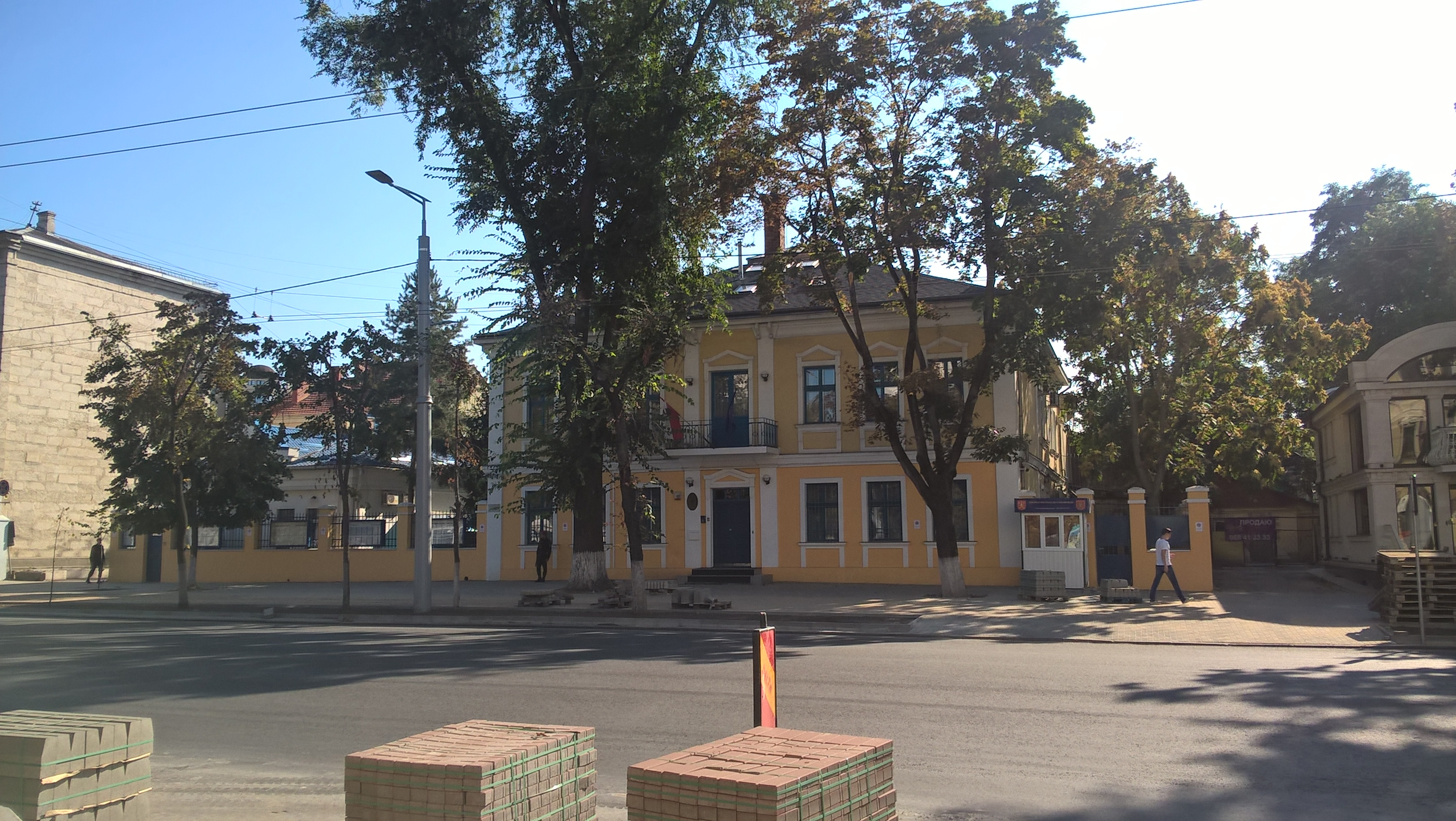
Embassy of Hungary

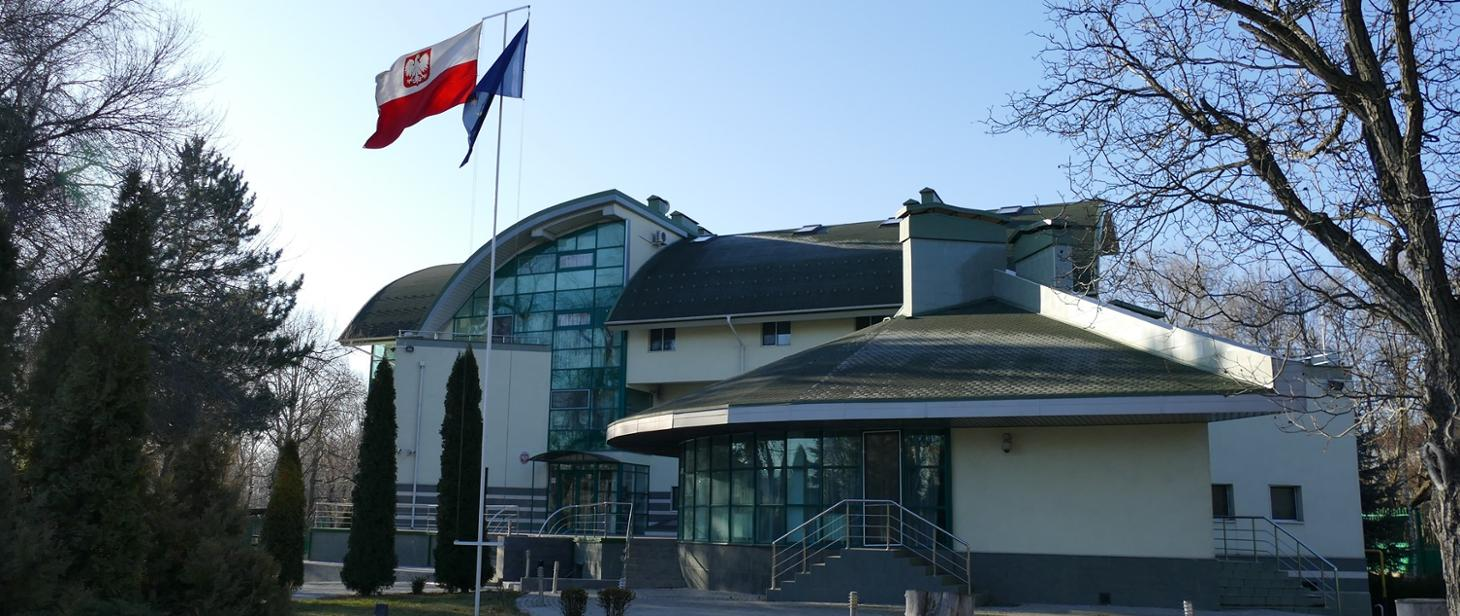
Embassy of Poland

Embassy of Russia

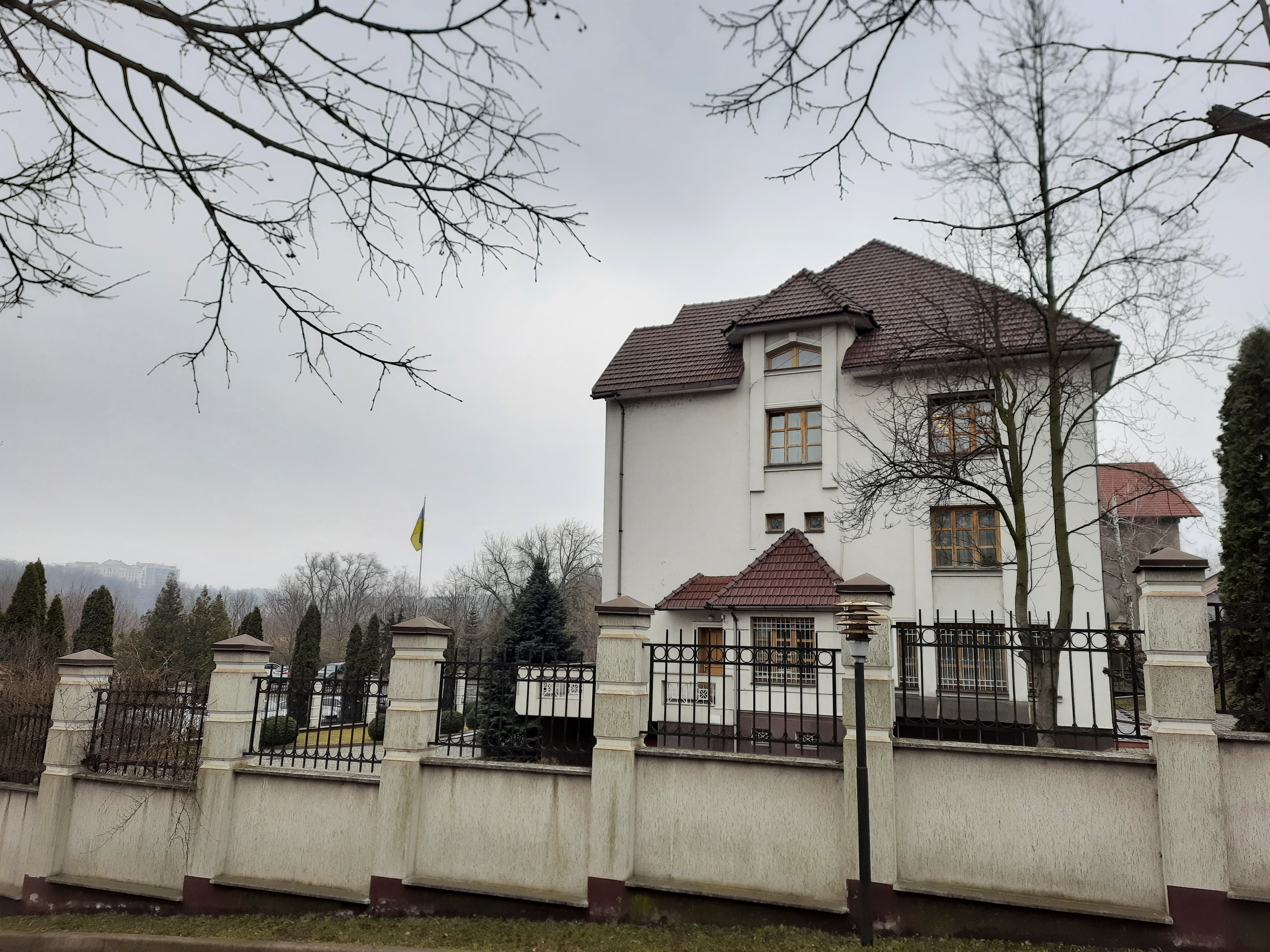
Embassy of Ukraine

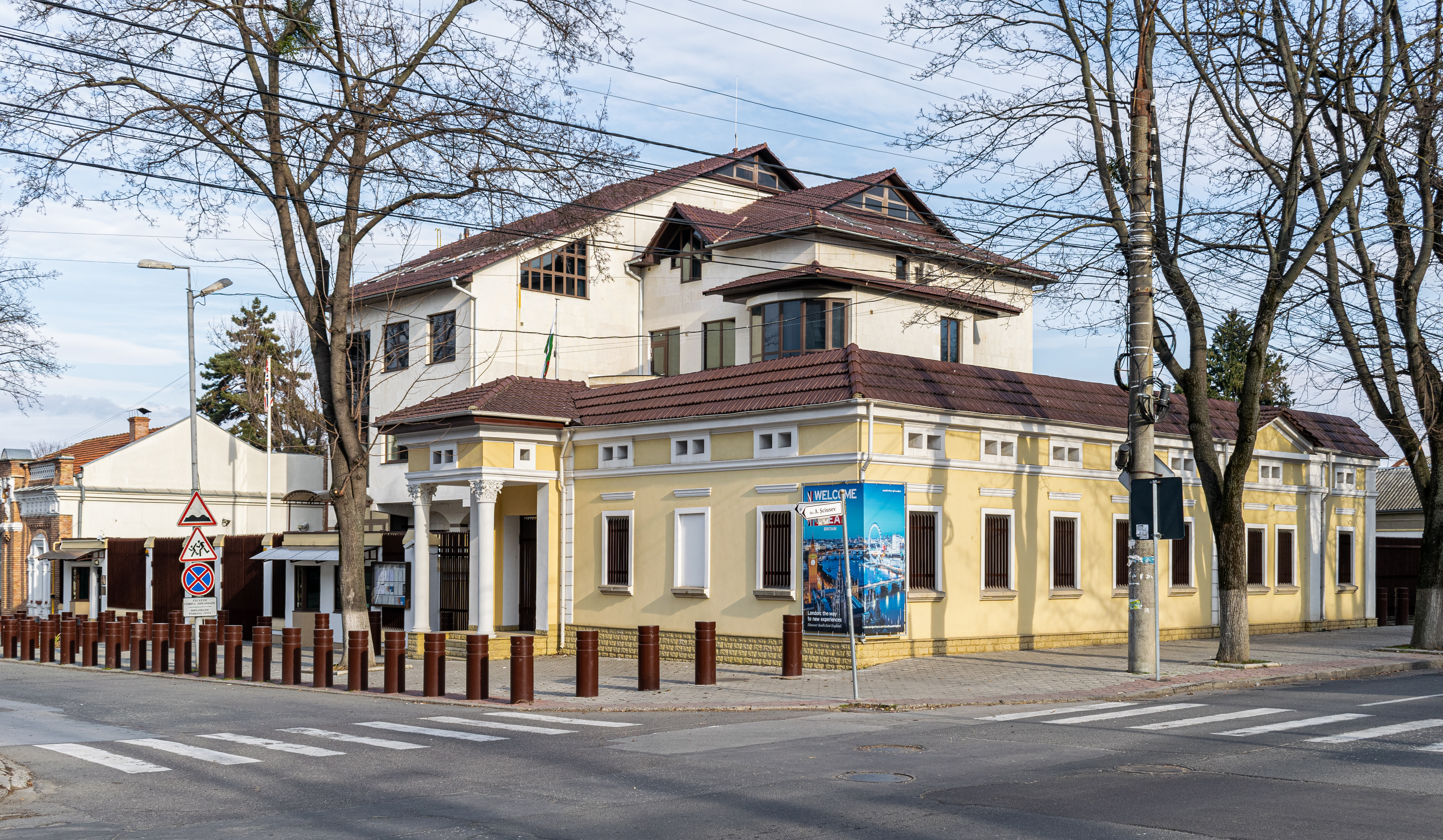
Embassy of the United Kingdom

Embassy of the United States

== Consular missions ==
=== Chișinău ===
1. Bulgaria (Consulate)
2. Romania (Consulate General)

=== Bălți ===
1. Romania (Consulate General)
2. Ukraine (Consulate)

=== Cahul ===
1. Romania (Consulate General)

=== Comrat ===
1. Turkey (Consulate General)

=== Taraclia ===
1. Bulgaria (Consulate)

=== Ungheni ===
1. Romania (Consular office)

== Non-resident embassies accredited to Moldova ==
=== Resident in Bucharest, Romania ===
1. Argentina
2. Bangladesh
3. Belgium
4. Canada
5. Colombia
6. Croatia
7. Cuba
8. Cyprus
9. Egypt
10. Estonia
11. Finland
12. Holy See
13. India
14. Indonesia
15. Jordan
16. Kuwait
17. Lebanon
18. Malaysia
19. Mexico
20. Montenegro
21. Morocco
22. North Macedonia
23. Pakistan
24. Peru
25. Philippines
26. Portugal
27. Saudi Arabia
28. Serbia
29. Slovenia
30. Spain
31. Sudan
32. Syria
33. Tunisia
34. Uruguay

=== Resident in Kyiv, Ukraine ===
1. Afghanistan
2. Algeria
3. Armenia
4. Australia
5. Brazil
6. Iran
7. Kyrgyzstan
8. South Africa
9. South Korea
10. Switzerland
11. Tajikistan
12. Turkmenistan
13. United Arab Emirates
14. Uzbekistan
15. Vietnam

=== Resident in Moscow, Russia ===
1. Angola
2. Ecuador
3. Ethiopia
4. Ghana
5. Guatemala
6. Guinea
7. Libya
8. Mali
9. North Korea
10. Senegal
11. Sri Lanka
12. Thailand
13. Uganda
14. Yemen
15. Zambia
16. Zimbabwe

=== Resident elsewhere ===
1. Albania (Sofia)
2. Bosnia and Herzegovina (Budapest)
3. Cambodia (Belgrade)
4. Madagascar (Rome)
5. Maldives (Geneva)
6. Malta (Valletta)
7. Mongolia (Sofia)
8. New Zealand (Brussels)
9. Oman (Budapest)
10. Paraguay (Vienna)
11. Panama (Warsaw)
12. San Marino (City of San Marino)
13. Sovereign Military Order of Malta (Vienna)

== See also ==
- List of diplomatic missions of Moldova
- Foreign relations of Moldova
- Visa requirements for Moldovan citizens
