= Ingrid Kressel Vinciguerra =

Estonian diplomat

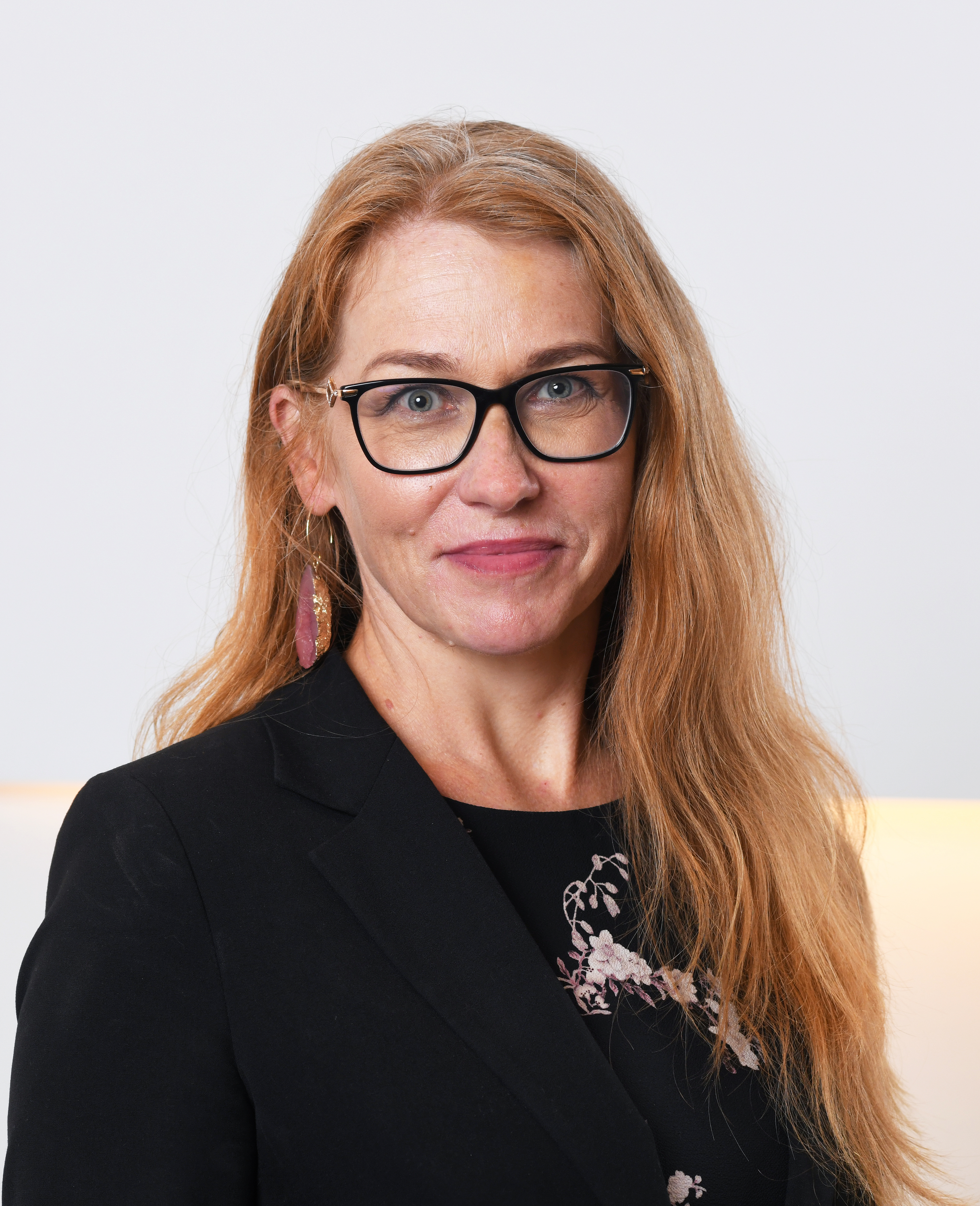
Ingrid Kressel Vinciguerra in 2022

Ingrid Kressel Vinciguerra (born 22 November 1973 in Tallinn) is an Estonian diplomat.

She has graduated from University of Tartu with a degree in law.

Member of the Bar since 27 May 1997. Title: Assistant of attorney at law. Bar membership is currently suspended due to the diplomatic service.

Since 1998 she has worked at Ministry of Foreign Affairs.

From August 2019 until August 2023 she was the Ambassador of Estonia to Romania, Bulgaria and Moldova.

Ingrid Kressel is awarded with the Commander class of The Order of the Star of Romania.
