= Vulnerability index (disambiguation) =

Vulnerability index may refer to:

- Vulnerability index, a generic concept developed in the Small Developing Islands program and extended to medical and environmental planning
- Economic Vulnerability Index, introduced by the United Nations Committee for Development Policy
- Environmental Vulnerability Index, a measurement devised by the South Pacific Applied Geoscience Commission of the United Nations Environment Program and others
- Homeless Vulnerability Index, a means for identifying and prioritizing the street homeless population for housing according to the fragility of their health

== See also ==
- Biotic index, a simple measurement of stream pollution and its effects on the biology of the stream
- Climate Vulnerability Monitor, which attempts to demonstrate how each country is vulnerable to climate change
- Environmental Performance Index
- Environmental Sustainability Index
- Pandemic severity index
- Social vulnerability
- Vulnerability assessment
- Vulnerability in computing
