= V20 =

V20 or V-20 may refer to:

== Aircraft ==
- Fokker V.20, a Dutch experimental aircraft
- LFG V 20, a German seaplane
- Pilatus UV-20A Chiricahua, an American utility transport aircraft

== Automobiles ==
- Lexus ES (V20), a Japanese executive car
- Toyota Camry (V20), a Japanese sedan

== Electronics ==
- Canon V-20, a MSX microcomputer
- NEC V20, a microprocessor
- LG V20, a smartphone

== Other uses ==
- ATC code V20 Surgical dressings, a subgroup of the Anatomical Therapeutic Chemical Classification System
- V20 engine, an engine with twenty cylinders
- V20, health supervision of infant or child, in the ICD-9 V codes
- Vulnerably Twenty, a bloc of the Climate Vulnerable Forum
