= Bangladesh–Bhutan relations =

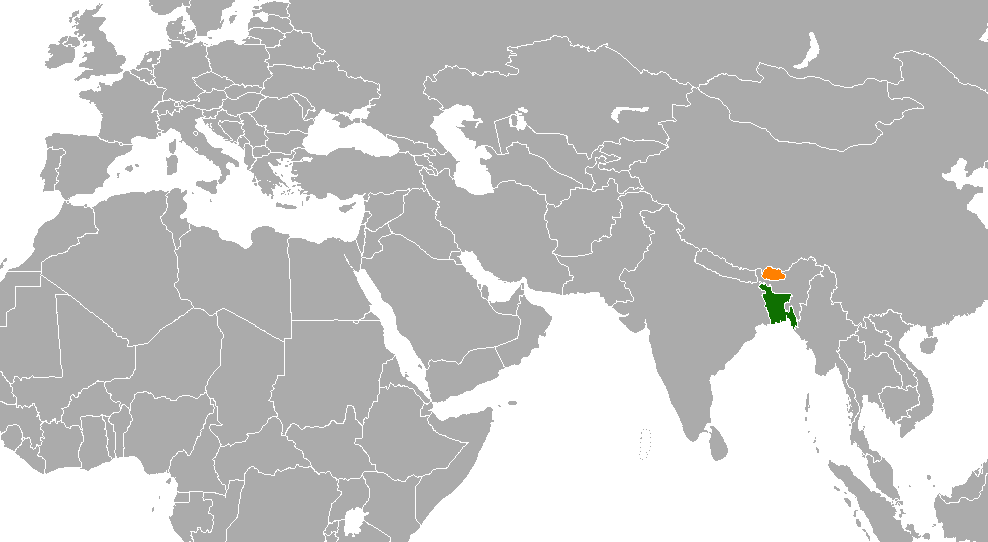

- Bangladesh: Bhutan

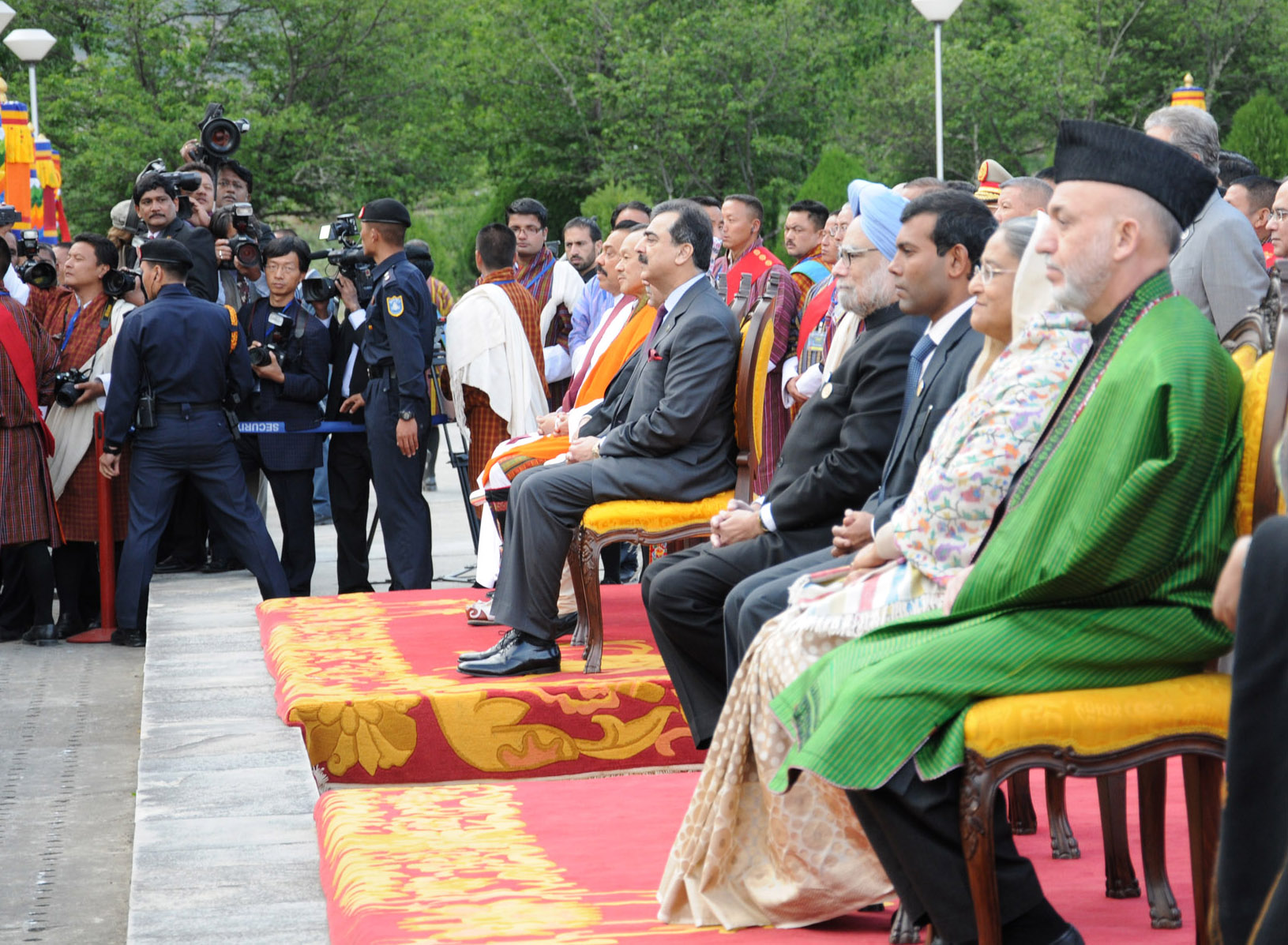
The Prime Ministers of Bangladesh and Bhutan with other South Asian leaders during the 16th SAARC Summit in Thimphu

Bangladesh–Bhutan relations are the bilateral relations between Bangladesh and Bhutan. The King of Bhutan was the first world leader to announce official recognition of Bangladesh's independence on 6 December 1971. The leadership of both countries have since exchanged many state visits. In 2016, the President of Bangladesh addressed the Parliament of Bhutan. On 6 December 2020, both countries signed a Preferential Trade Agreement (PTA) with provisions for free trade in certain goods. The signing of the PTA was witnessed by the Prime Minister of Bangladesh and the Prime Minister of Bhutan. Bhutan has an embassy in Dhaka. Bangladesh is one of only three countries to have an embassy in Thimphu.

Both countries are founding members of South Asian Association for Regional Cooperation. The two states cooperate within the framework of the UN and Bay of Bengal Initiative for Multi-Sectoral Technical and Economic Cooperation. Both countries are part of the Climate Vulnerable Forum. Bhutan's upper house of parliament has voted to not ratify a regional transport pact involving India, Nepal and Bangladesh.

== History ==
Ancient cities in Bangladesh traded with Himalayan states. The fort city of Bhitagarh in north Bengal was a center of trade with Bhutan. Mahayana Buddhism in Bhutan and Tibet was influenced by the Pala Empire of Bengal.. During British rule in the region, Bhutan ceded the Dooars under the Treaty of Sinchula in 1865 after the Bhutan War in the northern part of the Bengal Presidency. Bhutan became a protectorate of British India in 1910. After the partition of India in 1947, Bhutan signed an Indo-Bhutan Treaty of Friendship with the Dominion of India in 1949. Bhutan relied on India for guidance on foreign policy and there was little contact with East Pakistan.

On 21 September 1971, Bhutan joined the United Nations. On 6 December 1971, in one of its first assertive acts in foreign policy, Bhutan announced its recognition of East Pakistan as an independent Bangladesh. As the Bangladesh Liberation War approached the defeat of West Pakistani forces, the King of Bhutan sent a telegram to Acting President Syed Nazrul Islam of the Provisional Government of Bangladesh on the morning of 6 December 1971. Bhutan became the first state in the world to recognize the new country. It was later followed in the day by India. Below is a text of the telegram:

On behalf of my Government and myself, I would like to convey to Your Excellency and the Government of Bangladesh that we have great pleasure in recognizing Bangladesh as a sovereign independent country. We are confident that the great and heroic struggle of the people of Bangladesh to achieve freedom from foreign domination will be crowned with success in the close future. My people and myself pray for the safety of your great leader Sheikh Mujibur Rahman and we hope that God will deliver him safely from the present peril so that he can lead your country and people in the great task of national reconstruction and progress.

Jigme Dorji Wangchuck
King of Bhutan

6 December 1971

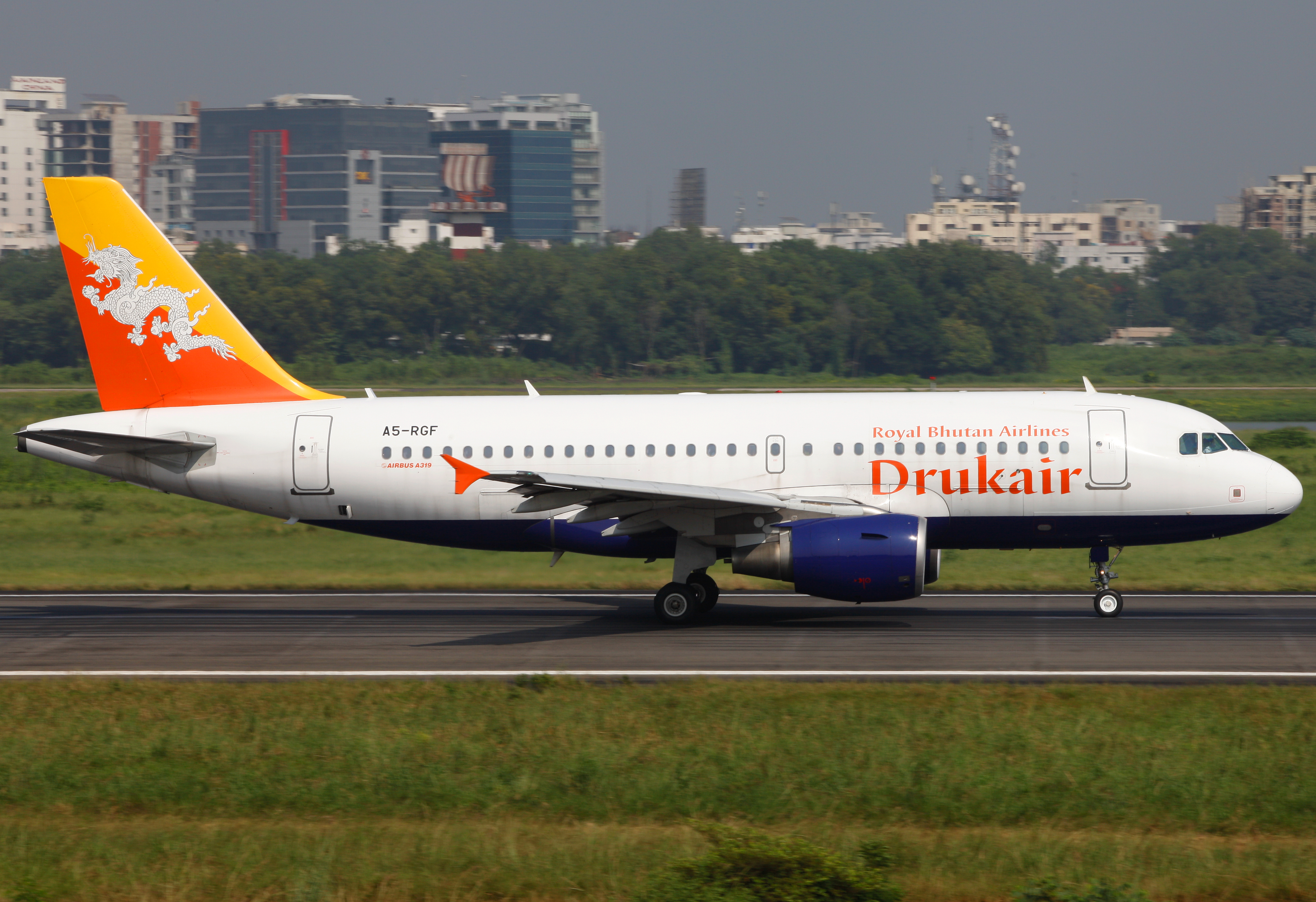
An Airbus A319 of Druk Air in Dhaka's international airport

The fourth king of Bhutan travelled to Bangladesh for state visits in 1974 and 1984. In 1980, Bhutan and Bangladesh signed a trade agreement for Most Favored Nation rules. In 1985, Bhutan attended the inaugural summit of the South Asian Association for Regional Cooperation (SAARC) in Dhaka. The Prime Minister of Bangladesh attended the 16th SAARC Summit in Bhutan in 2010. In 2012, Bangladesh posthumously bestowed one of its highest honors on the third king of Bhutan for his support to Bangladesh's independence war in 1971. Past Bangladeshi ambassadors to Bhutan have included senior diplomats M. Aminul Islam, Abul Hassan Mahmood Ali and Syed Muazzem Ali among others. The first female ambassador of Bhutan Pema Choden served as the kingdom's ambassador to Bangladesh. The Queen Mother of Bhutan visited Bangladesh in 2016 during which she toured facilities of BRAC and pharmaceutical, textile and ceramic companies. Lotay Tshering, an alumnus of Bangladeshi universities, became Bhutan's premier in 2018. Bangladesh sent emergency medicine supplies to Bhutan during the COVID-19 pandemic.

== Economic relations ==
Bangladesh is the largest buyer of Bhutanese apples and oranges. The volume of bilateral trade between the two countries stood at $57.90 million in fiscal year (FY) 2018–19. Bhutan exports chemicals, pulp, boulders, fruits and vegetables to Bangladesh. Bhutan imports garments, food products, plastics, pharmaceuticals, furniture and electrical products from Bangladesh. Bangladesh is exploring investments in Bhutan's hydropower sector as of 2020. Plans include a joint Indo-Bangladeshi investment of US$1.25 billion for Bhutan's 1,125-MW Dorjilung hydropower plant.

=== Preferential trade agreement ===
Bangladesh signed a preferential trade agreement with Bhutan on 6 December 2020. According to this agreement, 100 products of Bangladesh will get duty-free access to Bhutan and 34 Bhutanese products that will get duty-free access to the Bangladeshi market. In 2025, during a bilateral visit by Bhutanese Prime Minister, Bangladesh and Bhutan discussed strengthening trade cooperation including intention of singing the first free trade agreement between two countries.

== Climate change ==
Bhutan and Bangladesh are part of the Climate Vulnerable Forum and The Vulnerable Twenty Group. Melting glaciers and rising sea levels are major concerns in both countries.

== See also ==
- Foreign relations of Bangladesh
- Foreign relations of Bhutan
