= Climate change vulnerability =

Concept regarding strength of impact of climate change

Climate change vulnerability is a measure of how strongly people or ecosystems are likely to be affected by climate change. Its formal definition is the "propensity or predisposition to be adversely affected" by climate change. It can apply to humans and also to natural systems (or ecosystems). Issues around the capacity to cope and adapt are also part of this concept. Vulnerability is a component of climate risk. It differs within communities and also across societies, regions, and countries. It can increase or decrease over time. Vulnerability is generally a bigger problem for people in low-income countries than for those in high-income countries.

Higher levels of vulnerability will be found in densely populated areas, in particular those affected by poverty, poor governance, and/or conflict. Also, some livelihoods are more sensitive to the effects of climate change than others. Smallholder farming, pastoralism, and fishing are livelihoods that may be especially vulnerable. Further drivers for vulnerability are unsustainable land and ocean use, marginalization, and historical and ongoing patterns of inequity and poor governance.

There are many different notions of what it means to be vulnerable. An important distinction is between biophysical and social vulnerability. Biophysical vulnerability is about the effects of climate hazards such as heat waves, coastal flooding or tropical cyclones. Social vulnerability, on the other hand, is about the underlying political, institutional, economic and social factors within societies. These factors matter for how and why people are affected, and they put some people and places more at risk than others. People who are more vulnerable include those with low incomes, indigenous peoples, women, children, and the elderly.

Tools for vulnerability assessment vary depending on the sector, the scale and the entity or system which is thought to vulnerable. For example, the Vulnerability Sourcebook is a guide for practical and scientific knowledge on vulnerability assessment. Climate vulnerability mapping helps to determine which areas are the most vulnerable. Mapping can also help to communicate climate vulnerability to stakeholders. It is useful to carry out vulnerability assessments in advance of preparing local climate adaptation plans or risk management plans. Global vulnerability assessments use spatial mapping with aggregated data for the regional or national level.

== Definition ==
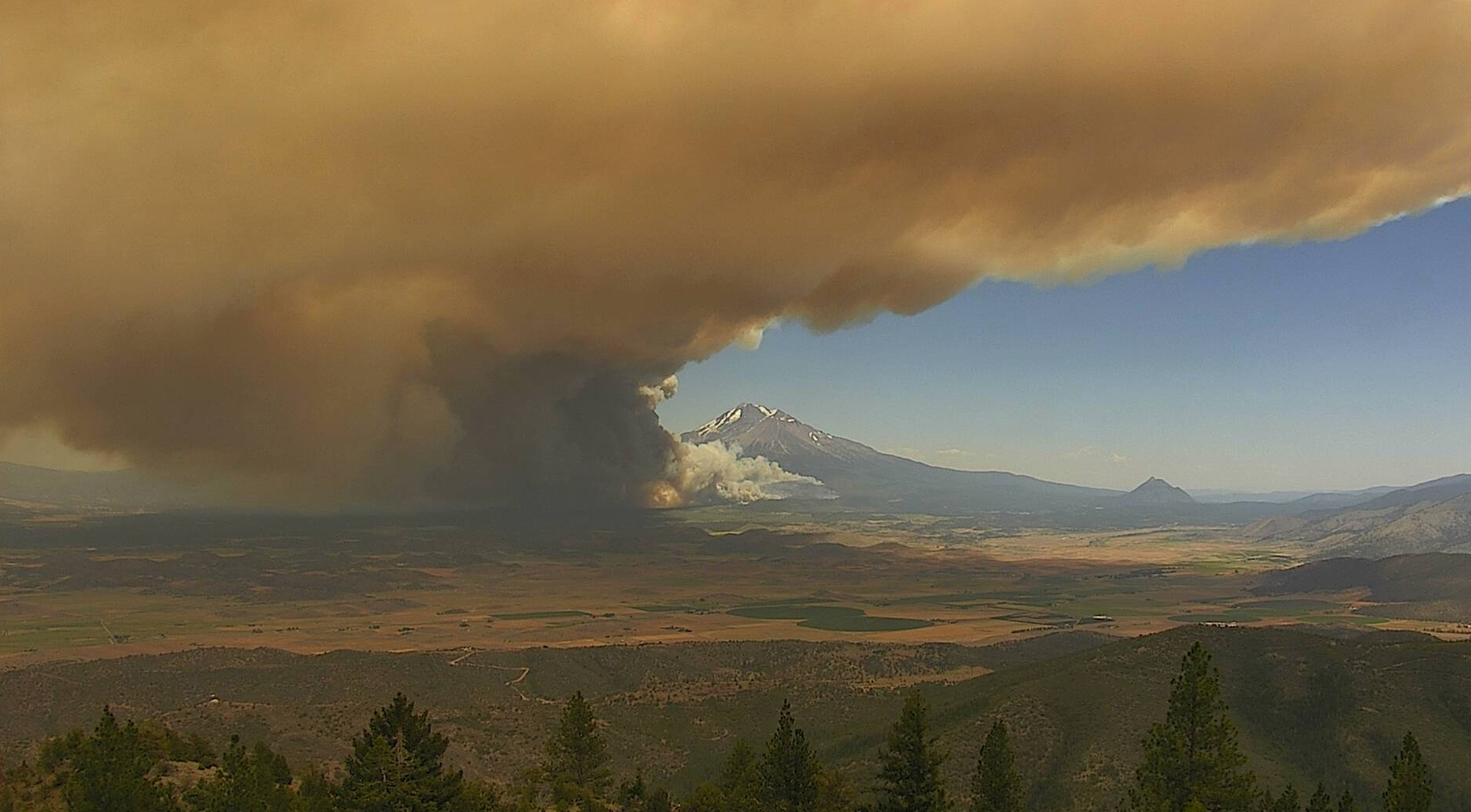
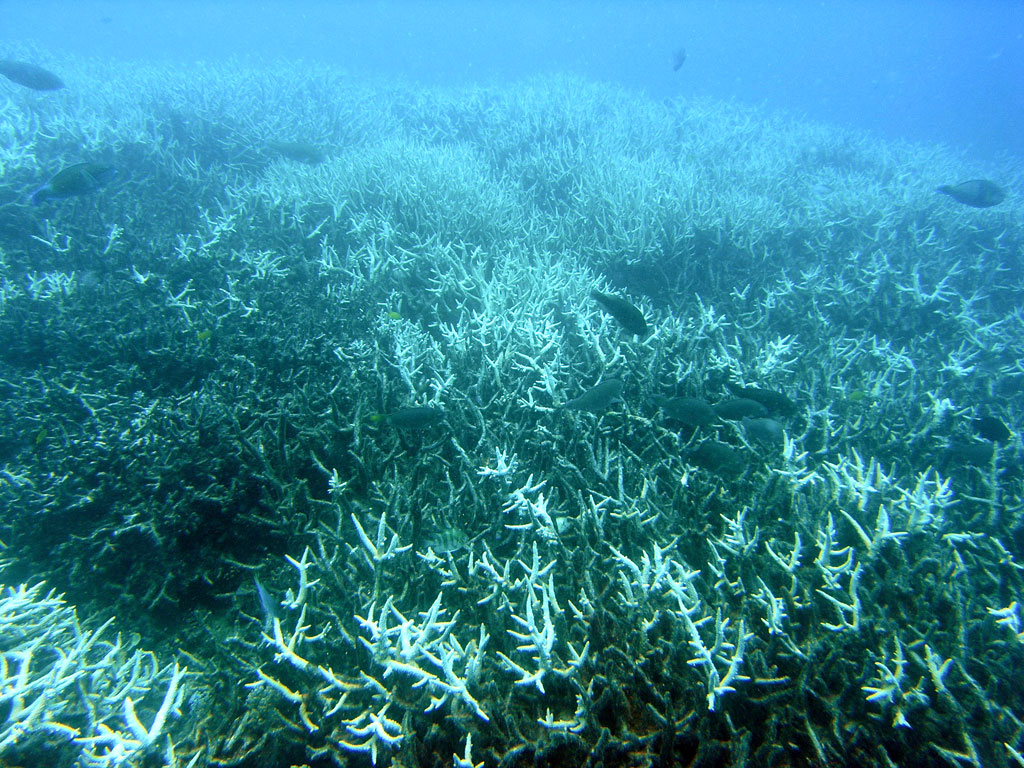
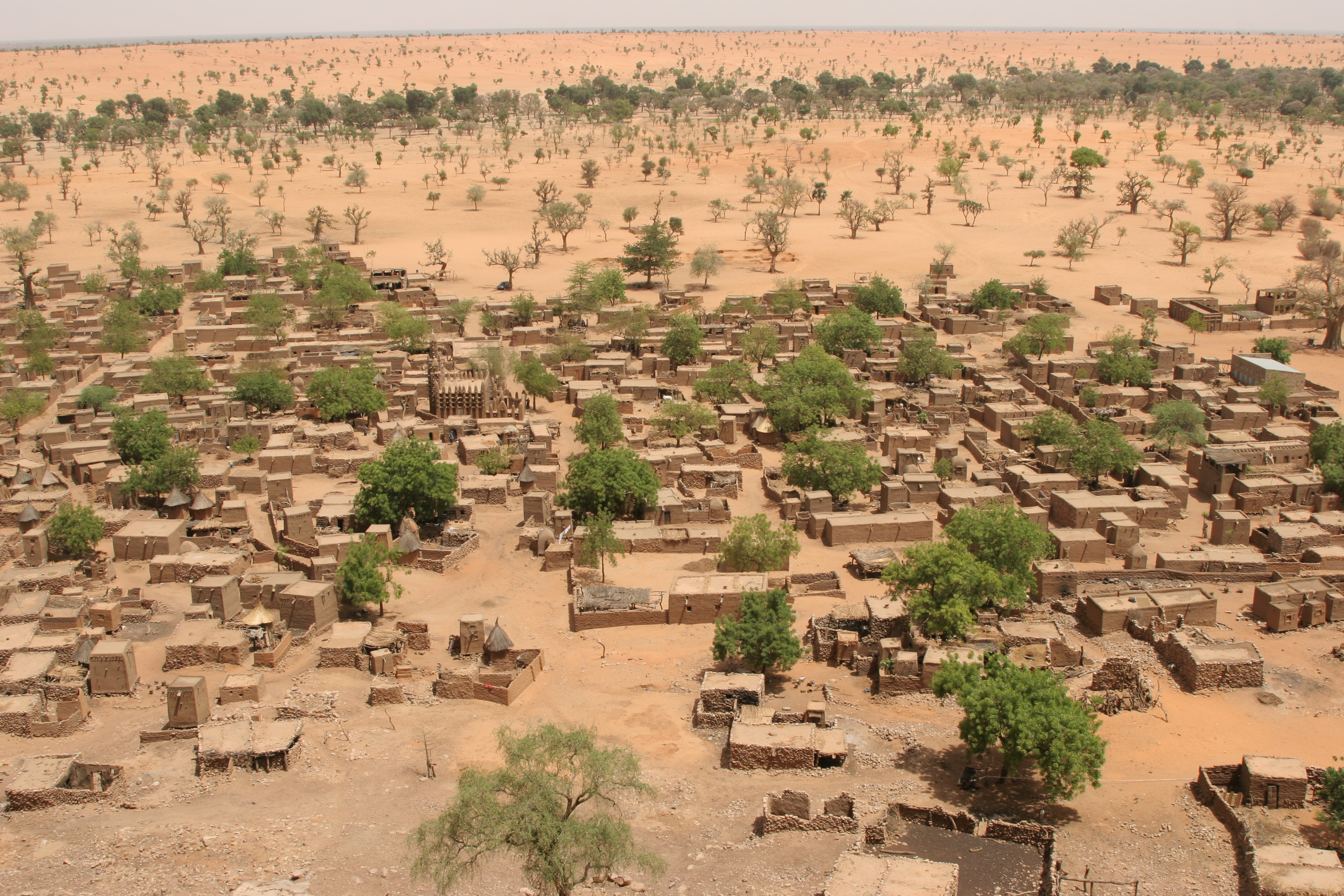
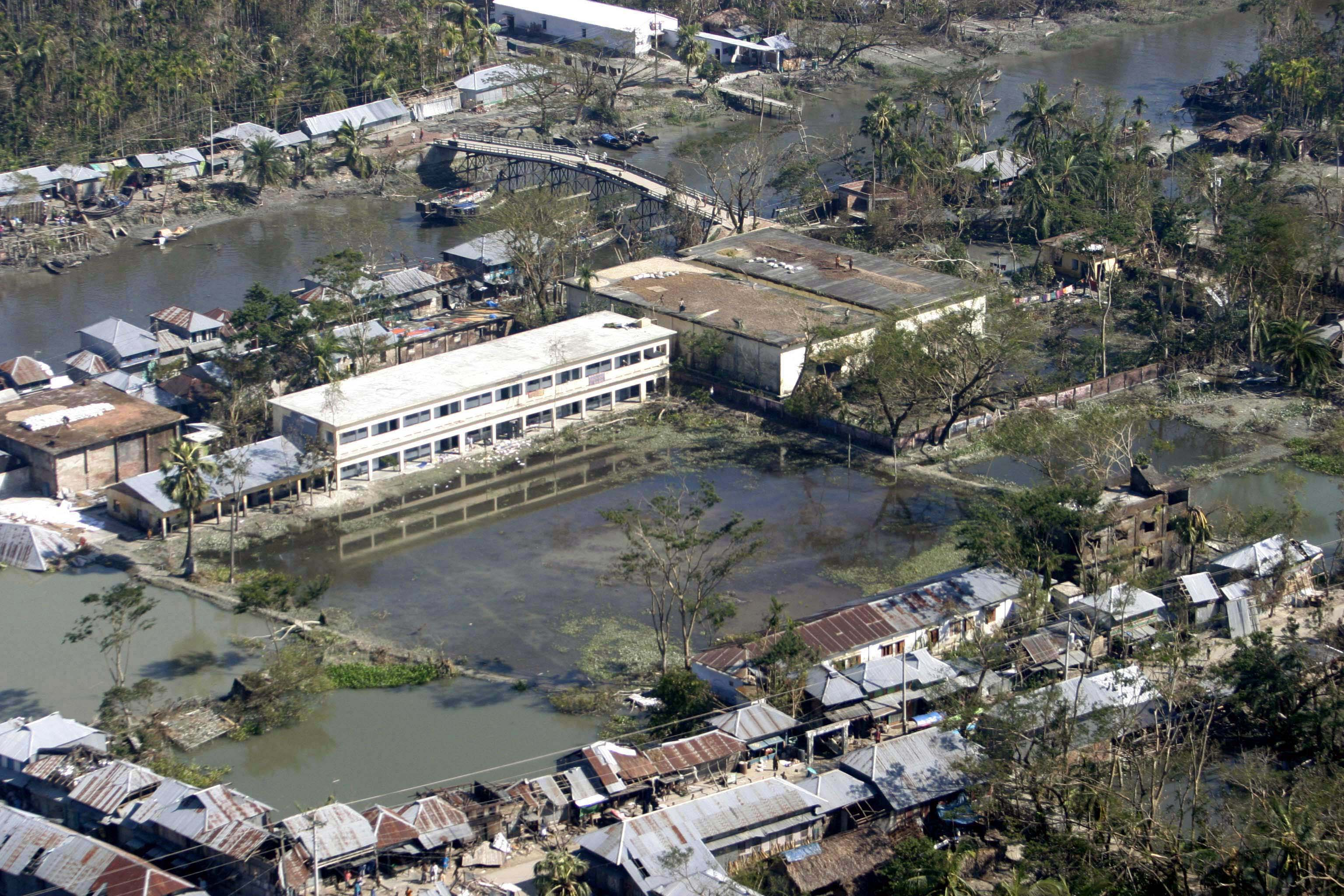
Some climate change effects: Wildfire caused by heat and dryness, bleached coral caused by ocean acidification and heating, environmental migration caused by desertification, and coastal flooding caused by storms and sea level rise.

Climate change vulnerability has been a central concept in academic research and IPCC assessments since 2001. The concept of vulnerability can refer to a wide variety of different meanings or contexts in climate change research. It can apply to humans or to natural systems (ecosystems), often simultaneously given the interdependence of humans and ecosystems. Vulnerability is a component of climate risk. Vulnerability will be higher if the capacity to cope and adapt is low.

One definition of climate change vulnerability is stated as the "propensity or predisposition to be adversely affected" by climate change. A similar definition is given by the Third IPCC report (2001): "the degree to which a system is susceptible to, and unable to cope with, adverse effects of climate change, including climate variability and extremes".

Early studies focused on biophysical vulnerability to climate change. In other words, the effects of physical climate hazards such as a heat wave or heavy rain events. This direction of research was shaped by earlier natural hazards research and it emphasised physical changes and energy flows in the landscape. It aims to quantify and measure the impacts of an event on the environment and on people. Since (biophysical) vulnerability is interpreted here as the negative outcome of climate change on people or places, it is also sometimes referred to as 'outcome vulnerability'.

An alternative framing focuses on social dimensions of vulnerability that set the context in which climate change happens. These dimensions include the political, institutional, economic and social structures that interact with the physical climate changes. For example, water privatization might affect the ability of people to respond to drought. This direction of research was shaped by human security research and they focus on the current context or 'starting point' for the social and biophysical processes. They are sometimes also referred to as 'contextual vulnerability' approaches. Research in this area focuses on analysing the factors that "put people and places at risk and reduce capacity to respond". See the section on 'Causes' below.

In the Fifth IPCC report, the social context was emphasized. It noted factors such as wealth and employment, access to technology and information, societal values and the role of institutions to resolve conflicts or develop relations among states as important. Vulnerability was defined as a characteristic of people or places independent of physical events. The report included two additional definitions, one of contextual vulnerability and one of outcome vulnerability.

=== Vulnerability and exposure ===
In the climate change context, exposure is defined as "the presence of people; livelihoods; species or ecosystems; environmental functions, services, and resources; infrastructure; or economic, social, or cultural assets in places and settings that could be adversely affected.".

In earlier definitions of vulnerability to climate change (in the Third IPCC report and Fourth IPCC report) vulnerability was defined as a function of exposure, sensitivity and adaptive capacity. This changed during the Fifth IPCC cycle. In this report, exposure was defined as one of the three interacting elements of climate risk, rather than as one of the external drivers of vulnerability. This change had two main implications. First, it means that vulnerability is understood as independent of exposure (and hazard) but is contextual. Second, it means that vulnerability assessment could focus on indicators for sensitivity and adaptive capacity to understand the current system weaknesses. For example, weaknesses such as the high ground slope of a farmland or marginalization of households in a community would make people or places sensitive to climate impacts. This makes it important to select the most hazard-relevant indicators for any vulnerability assessment. For example, to assess the vulnerability of traditional coastal fishing communities to sea surge, 'distance of dwellings from sea' and 'elevation of dwellings from sea level' would be hazard-relevant indicators.

== Types ==
Climate change vulnerability has a wide variety of different meanings and uses of the term have varied and evolved over time. The main distinction is between biophysical and social (or socioeconomic) vulnerability:

- Biophysical vulnerability is about the effects of physical climate hazards such as a heat wave or heavy rain events
- Social vulnerability considers the many political, institutional, economic and social structures that form the context for climate change

=== Biophysical or (physical) vulnerability ===
Early studies focused on biophysical vulnerability to climate change. In other words, the effects of physical climate hazards such as a heat wave or heavy rain events. This direction of research was shaped by earlier natural hazards research and it emphasised physical changes and energy flows in the landscape. It aims to quantify and measure the impacts of an event on the environment and on people. It plays down the role of people themselves in managing these impacts. Since (biophysical) vulnerability is interpreted here as the negative outcome of climate change on people or places, it is also sometimes referred to as 'outcome vulnerability'.

Physical vulnerability tends to focus on outcomes of monetary loss and disruptions. It is also sometimes defined as the "degree of loss" on a scale of 0 (no loss) to 1 (total loss). In this framework, for example, physical vulnerability to surface water hazards in mountain areas has been widely studied.

=== Social (socioeconomic) vulnerability ===
Social vulnerability is a more people-centred, holistic perspective on how and why people are affected by climate change. Vulnerability of ecosystems and people to climate change is driven by certain unsustainable development patterns such as "unsustainable ocean and land use, inequity, marginalization, historical and ongoing patterns of inequity such as colonialism, and governance". Therefore, vulnerability is higher in some locations than in others. Certain aspects within a region increase vulnerability, for example poverty, governance challenges and violent conflict. Some types of livelihoods are regarded as particularly climate-sensitive, resulting in a higher level of climate change vulnerability. These include for example smallholder farmers, pastoralists and fishing communities.

At its basic level, a community that is economically vulnerable is one that is ill-prepared for the effects of climate change because it lacks the needed financial resources. Preparing a climate resilient society will require huge investments in infrastructure, city planning, engineering sustainable energy sources, and preparedness systems. From a global perspective, it is more likely that people living at or below poverty will be affected the most by climate change and are thus the most vulnerable, because they will have the least amount of resource dollars to invest in resiliency infrastructure. They will also have the least amount of resource dollars for cleanup efforts after more frequently occurring natural climate change related disasters.

Vulnerability for people of a certain gender or age can be caused by "systemic reproduction of historical legacies of inequality", for example as part of "(post)colonial, (post)apartheid, and poverty discrimination". Social vulnerability of people can be related to aspects that make people different from one another (gender, class, race, age, etc.), and also the situational variables (where they live, their health, who lives with them in the household, how much they earn).

=== Other categories ===
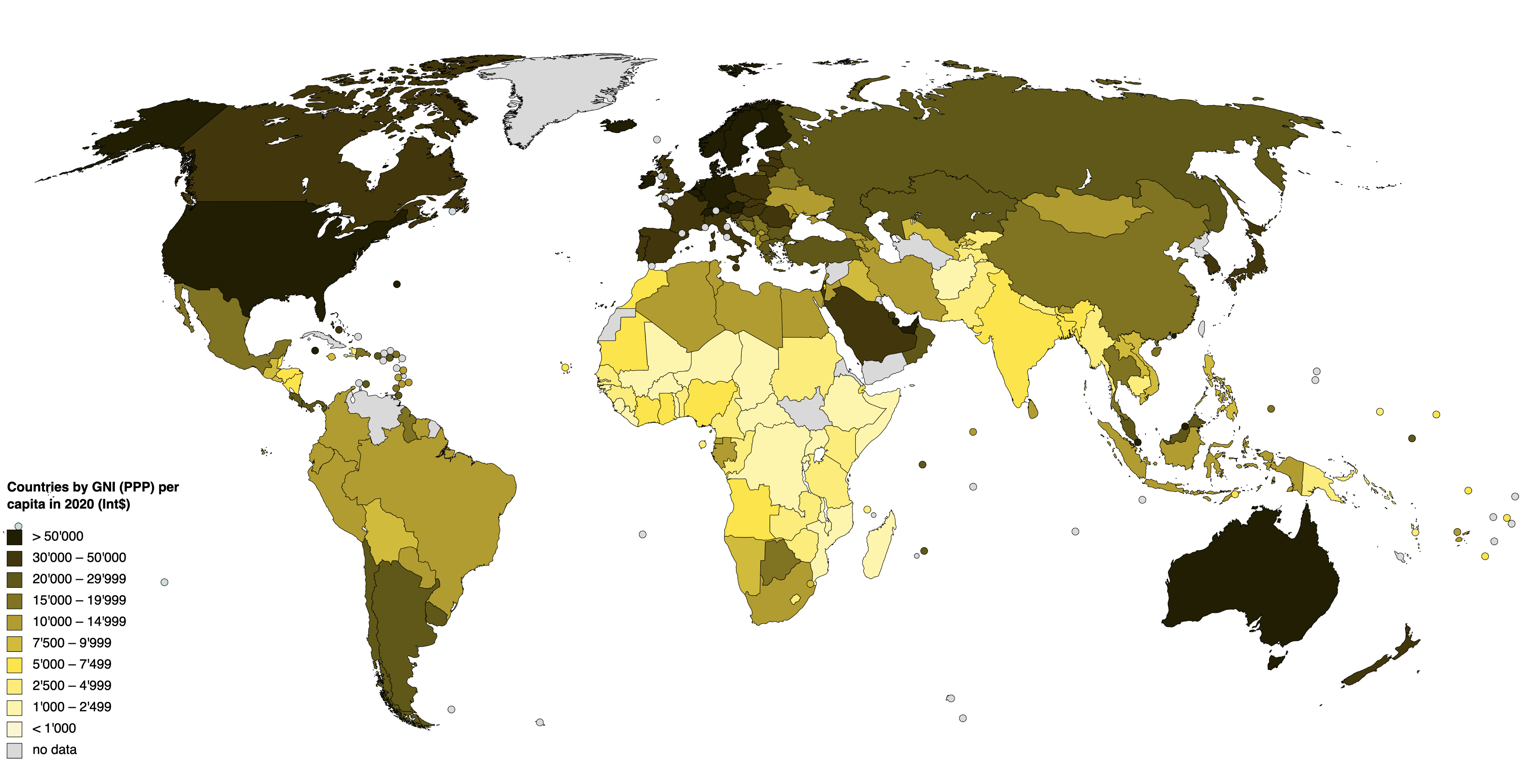
World gross national income per capita: Lower income countries tend to have a higher vulnerability to climate change.

Geographic, or place-based vulnerability to climate change is an important dimension. The most geographically vulnerable locations to climate change are those that will be impacted by side effects of natural hazards, such as rising sea levels and by dramatic changes in ecosystem services, including access to food. Island nations are usually noted as more vulnerable but communities that rely heavily on a sustenance based lifestyle are also at greater risk.

Around the world, climate change affects rural communities that heavily depend on their agriculture and natural resources for their livelihood. Increased frequency and severity of climate events disproportionately affects women, rural, dryland, and island communities. This leads to more drastic changes in their lifestyles and forces them to adapt to this change. It is becoming more important for local and government agencies to create strategies to react to change and adapt infrastructure to meet the needs of those impacted. Various organizations work to create adaptation, mitigation, and resilience plans that will help rural and at risk communities around the world that depend on the earth's resources to survive.

== Scale ==
It has been estimated in 2021 that "approximately 3.3 to 3.6 billion people live in contexts that are highly vulnerable to climate change".

The vulnerability of ecosystems and people to climate change is not the same everywhere: there are marked differences among and within regions (see regions that are particularly vulnerable below). Vulnerability can also increase or decrease over time.

== People who are more vulnerable ==
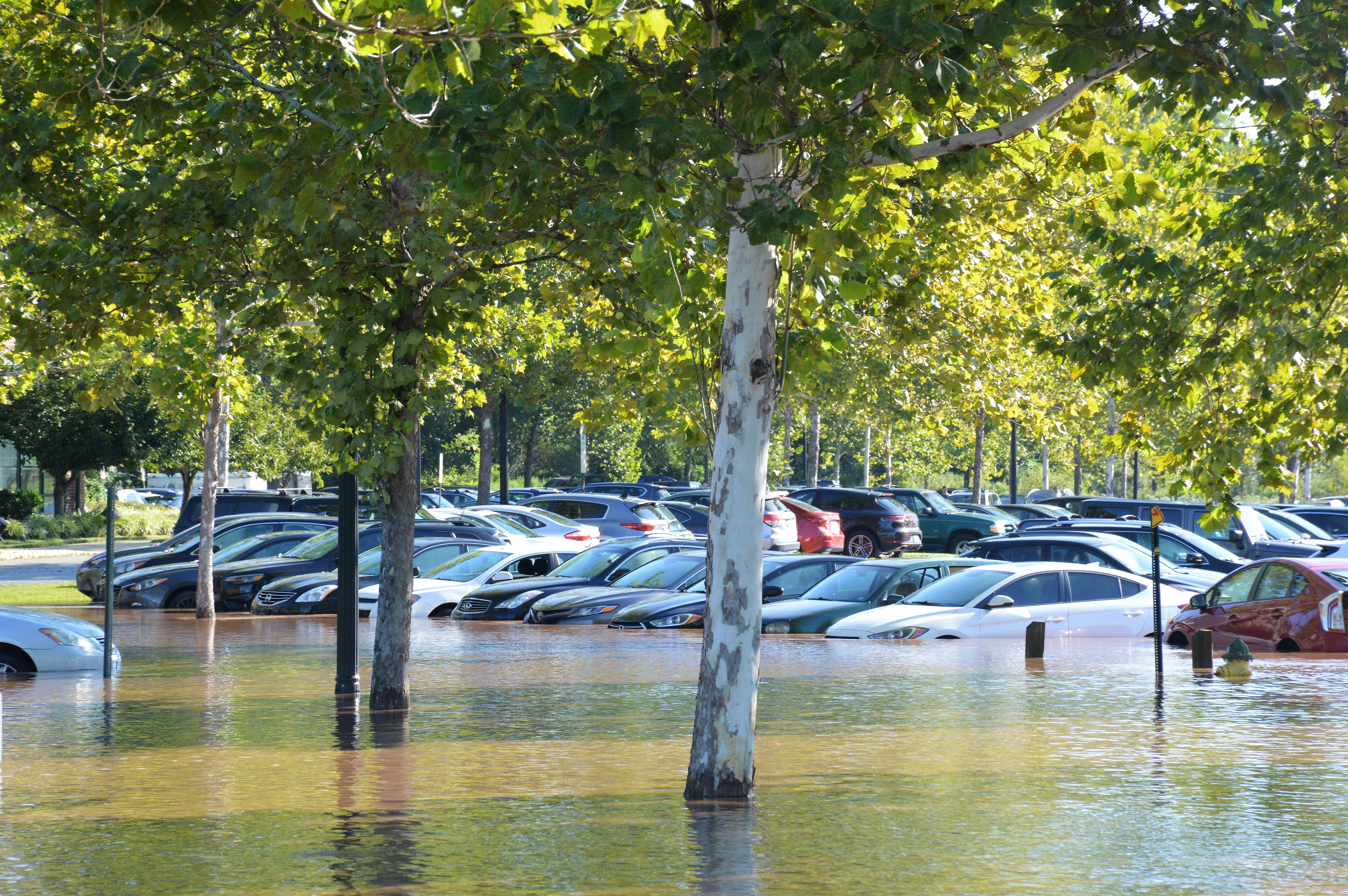
Hurricane Ida (2021) flooding effects in Pennsylvania, US where poorer neighbourhoods were more affected.

People who are more vulnerable to the effects of climate change than others include for example people with low incomes, indigenous peoples, women, children, the elderly. For example, when looking at the effects of climate change on human health, a report published in The Lancet found that the greatest impact tends to fall on the most vulnerable people such as the poor, women, children, the elderly, people with pre-existing health concerns, other minorities and outdoor workers.

There can be "structural deficits related to social, economic, cultural, political, and institutional conditions" which would explain why some parts of the population are more impacted than others. This applies for example to climate-related risks to household water security for women in remote rural regions in Burkina Faso or the urban poor in sub-Saharan Africa.

Climate change does not affect people within communities in the same way. It can have a bigger impact on vulnerable groups such as women, the elderly, religious minorities and refugees than on others.

- People living with disability. Climate impacts on disabled people have been identified by activists and advocacy groups as well as through the UNHCR adopting a resolution on climate change and the rights of people with disabilities.
- People living in poverty: Climate change disproportionally affects poor people in low-income communities and developing countries around the world. Those in poverty have a higher chance of experiencing the ill-effects of climate change, due to their increased exposure and vulnerability. A 2020 World Bank paper estimated that between 32 million to 132 million additional people will be pushed into extreme poverty by 2030 due to climate change.
- Women: Climate change increases gender inequality. It reduces women's ability to be financially independent, and has an overall negative impact on the social and political rights of women. This is especially the case in economies that are heavily based on agriculture.
- Indigenous peoples: Indigenous communities tend to rely more on the environment for food and other necessities. This makes them more vulnerable to disturbances in ecosystems. Indigenous communities across the globe generally have bigger economic disadvantages than non-indigenous communities. This is due to the oppression they have experienced. These disadvantages include less access to education and jobs and higher rates of poverty. All this makes them more vulnerable to climate change.
- Children: The Lancet review on health and climate change lists children among the worst-affected by global warming. Children under 14 are 44 percent more likely to die from environmental factors.

In July 2026, an interim report on research done by Plan International and the University of Technology Sydney showed that the effects of climate change in Asia and the Pacific areas (specifically Bangladesh, Nepal, and Solomon Islands) were particularly pronounced on the lives of adolescent girls. The prevalence of child marriage increased in times of climate event stress, when families lost their livelihoods and thus income owing to flooding and other natural disasters. According to the International Rescue Committee, the rate of child marriages rose up to 39 per cent after such an event, as the family could not afford to keep a daughter at home and pay for her education.

While strides have been made to make social vulnerability assessments more inclusive and intersectional there is often an absence of the consideration of sexual and gender minorities. Gender based analysis tends to focus on men or women and rarely include third gender, transgender and gender nonconforming individuals, queerness and sexuality are often absent from the discussion altogether. People who are part of the LGBTQ+ community face unique challenges in relation to the effects of climate change and hazard events as they may, for example, struggle to access resources and aid due to discrimination, inflexible policy decisions or gender segregation. Considering, for example, global flood risk this becomes especially relevant as the risk seems to be higher in countries with lower rates of social acceptance for sexual and gender minorities.

== The Impact of Climate Change on Health Outcomes ==
=== Varying Racial and Ethnic Groups ===
The extent to which climate change can negatively impact the health outcomes of populations may vary amongst different racial and ethnic groups across the globe. It is also important in this case to note that social positions can be denoted by race or ethnicity. Therefore, there can exist a variance in health outcomes as a result of differences in exposure and accessibility to healthcare to mitigate the health damages caused by climate change.

It is understood that increased exposure to high temperatures as a result of global warming can lead to acute heat-related illnesses such as heat stroke or can aggravate pre-existing conditions. In a study done in Los Angeles, California during a heat wave, it was found that African American populations were at greater risk of mortality. In fact, the mortality rate of African Americans during this 2006 heat wave was double that of the average population. Heat-related emergency department visits were also significantly increased for ethnic populations as there was a spike in emergency department visits found amongst Asian/Pacific Islander populations and African American populations.

Although some may attribute the discrepancy in mortality and hospitalization rates among ethnic groups to physiological differences between populations, not enough evidence has been provided to support this statement. Rather, studies show that these differences in health outcomes amongst different racial and ethnic groups are more likely to be the result of socioeconomic variance. Racial minorities are more likely to be socioeconomically disadvantaged and are therefore more likely to take on underpaid high-risk occupations, live in hazardous areas, and have difficulty finding the financial resources to maintain a healthy level of thermal comfort.

A study done in Phoenix, Arizona highlighted that more heat distress calls were made in neighborhoods consisting of primarily African American and low-income Hispanic populations. It is found that financially disadvantaged communities, often which are composed of ethnic minorities, have a propensity to be warmer neighborhoods despite the lack of access to means of thermal regulation.

The urban heat island effect emphasizes the fact that urban areas tend to be most impacted. During a heat wave in Oklahoma City, a study examined the urban island heat effect in varying communities. It was found that the hotter inner city region, one densely populated by minority residents, was severely inadequately equipped with air-conditioning. This inadequate access to resources that allow for thermal regulation in homes, coupled with overcrowded living spaces in low-income, minority communities can be a significant health hazard.

It is also important to discuss occupational hazards when elaborating upon the impact of climate change on the health outcomes of varying racial and ethnic groups. Extreme heat can be detrimental to outdoor workers. Several studies have revealed that the agricultural workforce has been negatively affected by the growing effects of climate change. The majority of agricultural workers are from Latin America, with also a significant population who are also composed of Asian and Caribbean migrants, and people of Native American and African American descent. In the same analysis done on the 2006 heat wave in California, it was found that there was a significantly increased rate of hospitalization for cardiac-related illnesses amongst crop workers of Hispanic backgrounds as a result of occupational hazards. To mitigate this concern, more relevant occupational health and safety training programs should be set in place and working conditions should be more carefully monitored.

Language barriers may also play a role in the difference of health outcomes amongst varying ethnic groups as a result of climate change. Reduced access to English media and important public health statements as a result of linguistic barriers. This may also lead to a reduction of adaptive behavior and can put some individuals in danger of experiencing heat-related illnesses or exacerbating existing conditions.

=== Older Adults (65+ years) ===
==== Introduction ====
As global temperatures rise, extreme weather events become more frequent, and air quality worsens due to climate change, older adults (aged 65 and above) face increased risks of heat-related illnesses, chronic disease, and infectious diseases. Both physiological vulnerabilities and sociological factors compound the risk of negative health outcomes that older adults face from climate change.

== Reducing vulnerability ==
Vulnerability can be reduced through climate change adaptation measures. For this reason, vulnerability is often framed in dialogue with climate change adaptation. Furthermore, measures that reduce poverty, gender inequality, bad governance and violent conflict would also reduce vulnerability. And finally, vulnerability would be reduced for everyone if decisive action on climate change was taken (climate change mitigation) so that the effects of climate change are less severe.

=== Climate change adaptation ===
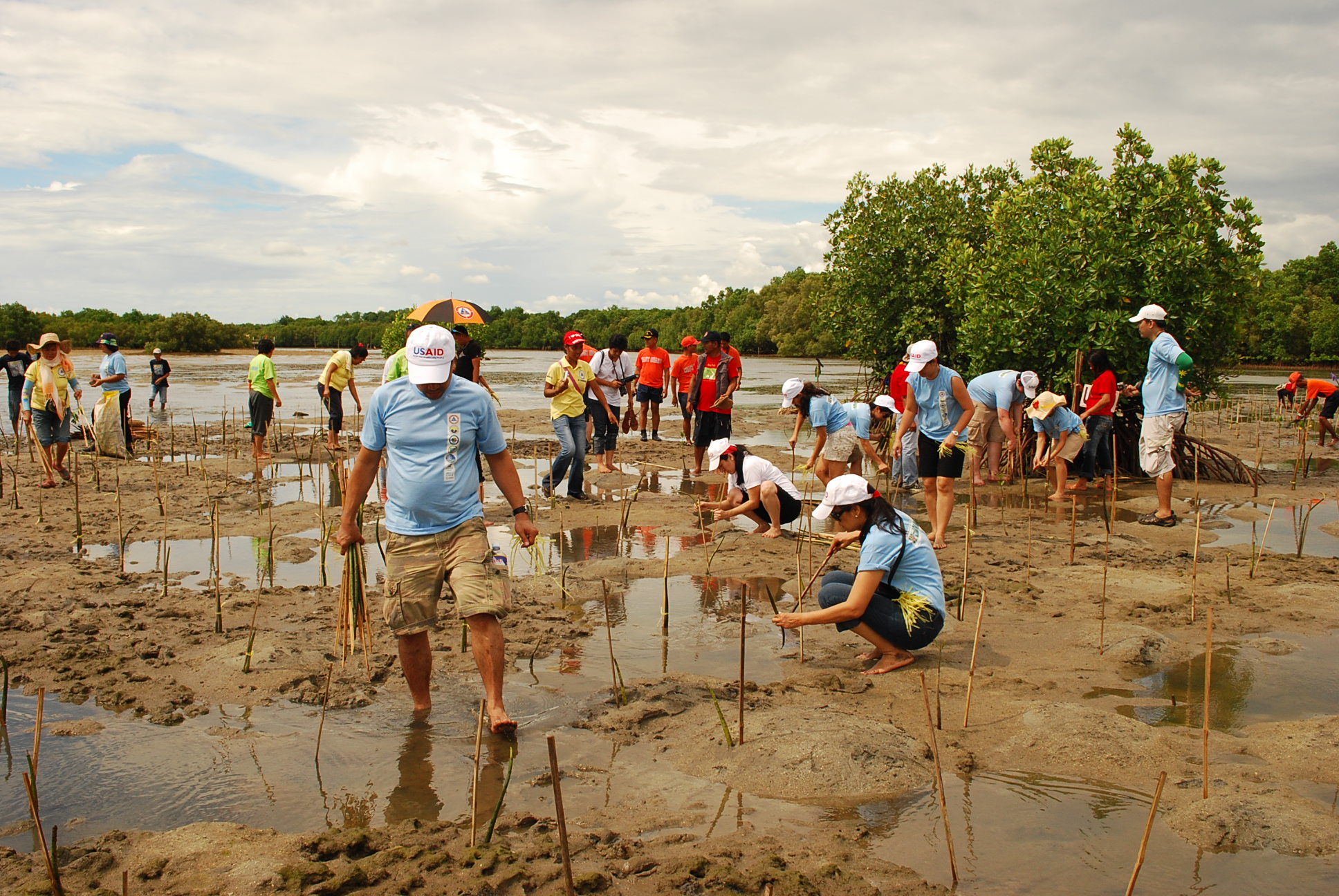
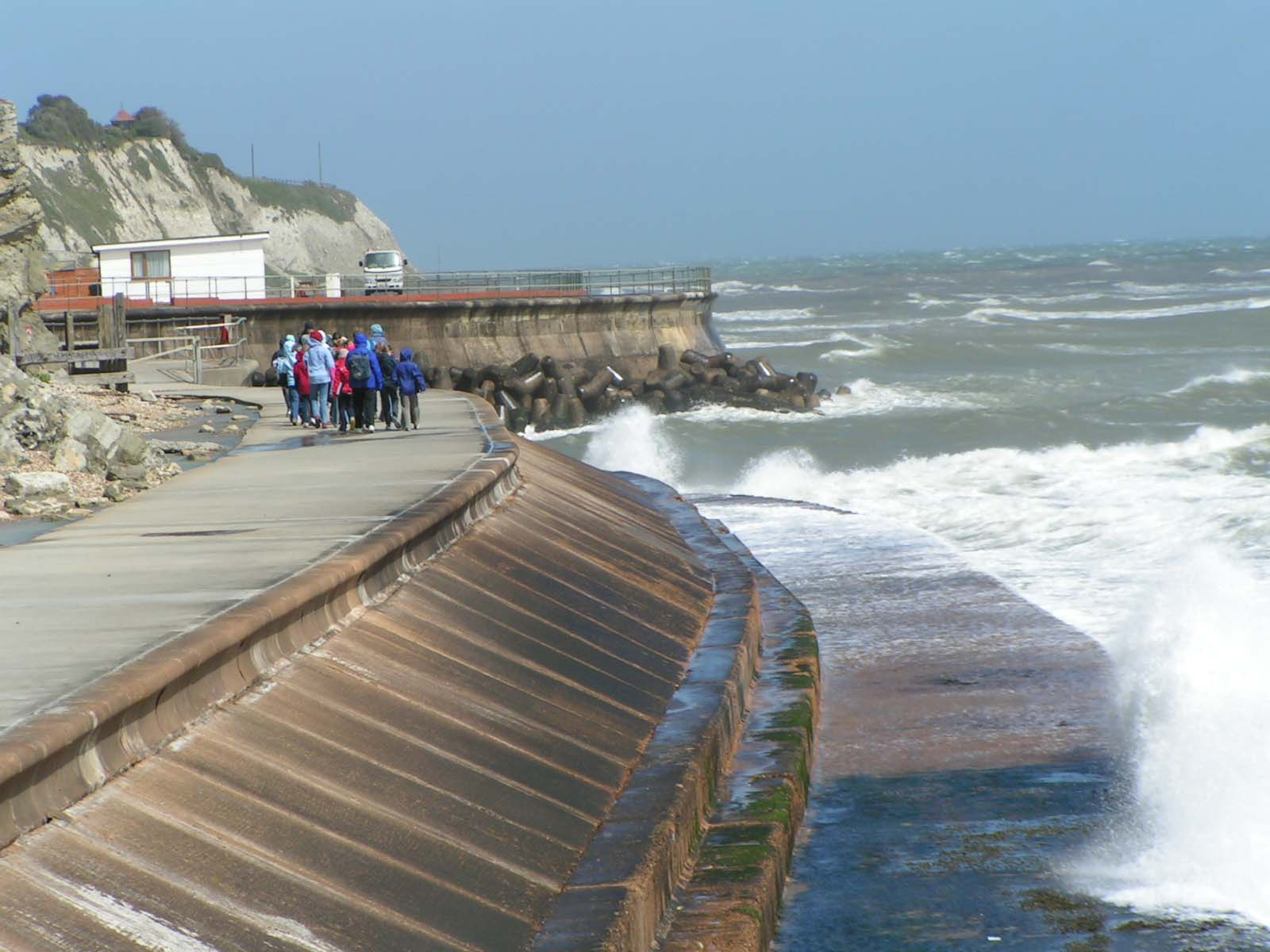
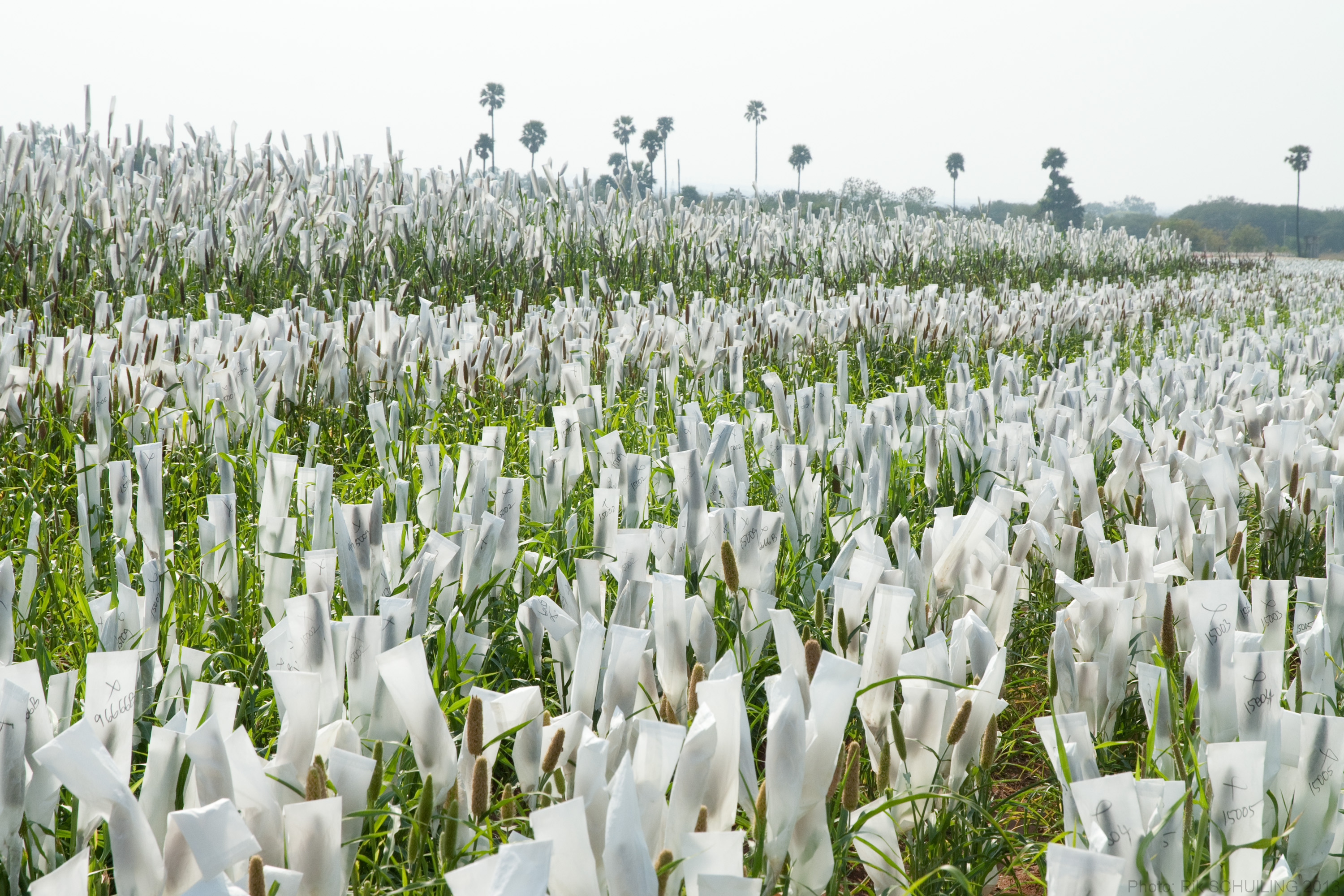
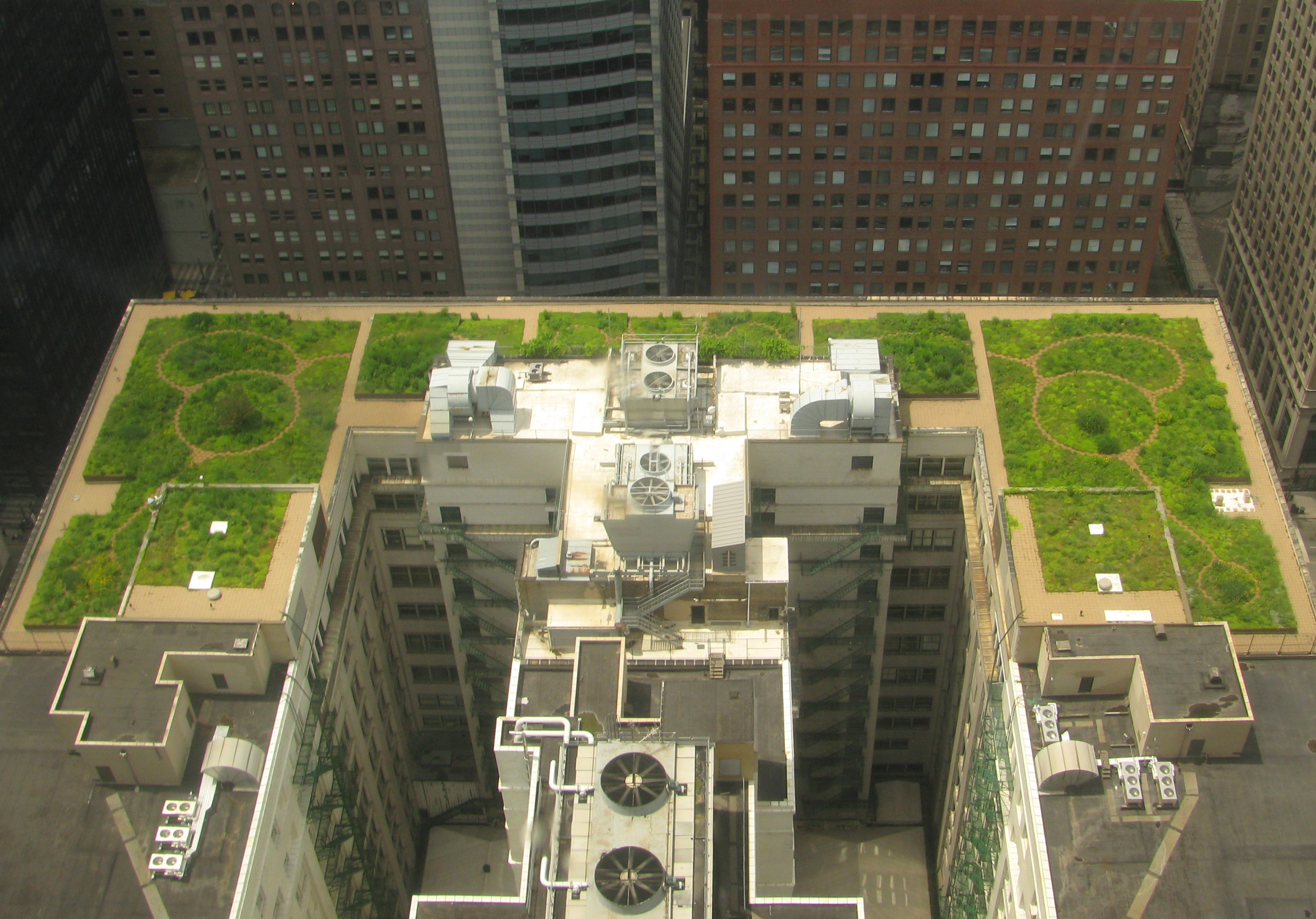
Adapting to climate change involves structural, physical, social and institutional approaches. Clockwise from top left: mangrove planting and other habitat conservation; seawalls to protect against storm surge worsened by sea level rise; green roofs provide cooling in cities and reduce urban heat island effects; selective breeding for drought-resistant crops.

Climate change adaptation is the process of adjusting to the effects of climate change, both current and anticipated. Adaptation aims to moderate or avoid harm for people, and is usually done alongside climate change mitigation. It also aims to exploit opportunities. Adaptation can involve interventions to help natural systems cope with changes.

=== Climate resilience ===
Climate resilience is a concept to describe how well people or ecosystems are prepared to bounce back from certain climate hazard events. The formal definition of the term is the "capacity of social, economic and ecosystems to cope with a hazardous event or trend or disturbance". For example, climate resilience can be the ability to recover from climate-related shocks such as floods and droughts. Different actions can increase climate resilience of communities and ecosystems to help them cope. They can help to keep systems working in the face of external forces. For example, building a seawall to protect a coastal community from flooding might help maintain existing ways of life there.

=== Climate justice ===
Equity is another essential component of vulnerability and is closely tied to issues of environmental justice and climate justice. As the most vulnerable communities are likely to be the most heavily impacted, a climate justice movement is coalescing in response. There are many aspects of climate justice that relate to vulnerability and resiliency. The frameworks are similar to other types of justice movements and include contractarianism which attempts to allocate the most benefits for the poor, utilitarianism which seeks to find the most benefits for the most people, egalitarianism which attempts to reduce inequality, and libertarianism which emphasizes a fair share of burden but also individual freedoms.

Examples of climate justices approach can be seen by the work done by the United States government on both federal and local levels. On a federal level, The Environmental Protection Agency works toward the goals of Executive Order 12898, Federal Actions to Address Environmental Justice in Minority Populations and Low-Income Populations. E.O 12898 states the goals of implementing federal environmental justice initiatives that work toward aiding minority and low-income communities that suffer from disproportionate environmental or human health impacts. To alleviate environmental and health challenges within many American communities the U.S Environmental Protection Agency has implemented projects region by region to ensure the development of environmental justice. These developments include but are not limited to population vulnerability, green space development locally as well as federally, and the reevaluation of environmentally disproportionate health burdens.

=== Climate Vulnerable Forum ===
The Climate Vulnerable Forum (CVF) is a global partnership of countries that are disproportionately affected by the consequences of climate change. The forum addresses the negative effects of climate change as a result of heightened socioeconomic and environmental vulnerabilities. These countries actively seek a firm and urgent resolution to the current intensification of climate change, domestically and internationally. The CVF was formed to increase the accountability of industrialized nations for the consequences of global climate change. It also aims to exert additional pressure for action to tackle the challenge, which includes the local action by countries considered susceptible. Political leaders involved in this partnership are "using their status as those most vulnerable to climate change to punch far above their weight at the negotiating table". The governments which founded the CVF agree to national commitments to pursue low-carbon development and carbon neutrality.

== Measurement tools ==
Vulnerability assessment is important because it provides information that can be used to develop management actions in response to climate change. Climate change vulnerability assessments and tools are available at all scales. Macro-scale vulnerability assessment often uses indices. Modelling and participatory approaches are also in use. Global vulnerability assessments are based on spatial mapping using aggregated data for the regional or national level.

Assessments are also done at sub-national and sectoral level, and also increasingly for cities on an urban district or neighbourhood scale. Vulnerability assessment is also done for local communities to evaluate where and how communities and livelihoods are vulnerable to climate change. Studies can vary widely in scope and scale— for example the World Bank and Ministry of Economy of Fiji commissioned a report for the whole country in 2017-18 while the Rochester, New York commissioned a much more local report for the city in 2018. Or, for example, NOAA Fisheries commissioned Climate Vulnerability assessments for marine fishers in the United States. In some cases vulnerability assessment is done in advance of preparing local climate adaptation plans or risk management plans.

=== Indicators and indices ===
Global indices for climate change vulnerability include the ND-GAIN Country Index, which measures national climate vulnerability globally, INFORM Risk Index and the WorldRiskIndex, which include social vulnerability indices. Indicator approaches are also used at national and sub-national levels. They use a composite index of many individual quantifiable indicators. To generate the index value or 'score', most often a simple average is calculated across a set of standardized values. However, sometimes weighting is done according what are thought to be the most important determinants of vulnerability.

Another important index for social vulnerability is the SoVi index developed in 2003 by ressearchers Susan L. Cutter, B.J Boruff, and W.L. Shirley to measure the social vulnerability of geographic areas to environmental hazards. The index is based on a comparative metric and is specifically developed based on U.S:. counties data. Rather than focusing on the climate risksm the index synthesizes socioeconomic and demographic variables such as poverty status, age, race, gender, and the level of built environment development. It evaluates a cammunity's capacity to prepare for, respond to, and recover from disasters.

Climate vulnerability tracking starts identifying the relevant information, preferably open access, produced by state or international bodies at the scale of interest. Then a further effort to make the vulnerability information freely accessible to all development actors is required. Vulnerability tracking has many applications. It constitutes an indicator for the monitoring and evaluation of programs and projects for resilience and adaptation to climate change. Vulnerability tracking is also a decision making tool in regional and national adaptation policies.

=== Vulnerability curves ===
Climate vulnerability curves are a method of assessing physical vulnerability on various sectors such as agriculture, infrastructure, health, and ecosystems. They show a relationship between different levels of climate-related hazards (like extreme temperatures, sea-level rise, or intense precipitation) and the effects, or damages.

=== Tools for vulnerability assessment ===
Similarly as for climate risk assessment, tools for vulnerability assessment vary depending on the sector, the scale at which the study is being carried out, and the entity or system which is thought to vulnerable. Modelling and other participatory tools include WEAP for understanding water resource vulnerabilities and assessing adaptation options. The Vulnerability Sourcebook is a guide for practical and scientific knowledge on vulnerability assessment. Climate vulnerability mapping is also used to understand which areas are the most geographically vulnerable. A systematic review published in 2019 found 84 studies focused on the use of mapping to communicate and do analysis of climate vulnerability.

== By region and country ==
All regions of the world are vulnerable to climate change but to a different degree. With high confidence, researchers concluded in 2001 that developing countries would tend to be more vulnerable to climate change than developed countries. Based on development trends in 2001, scientists have found that few developing countries would have the capacity to efficiently adapt to climate change. This was partly due to their low adaptive capacity and the high costs of adaptation in proportion to their GDP.

The Arctic is extremely vulnerable to climate change. It was predicted in 2007 that there would be major ecological, sociological, and economic impacts in the region. Among those being disproportionately impacted by issues regarding climate change have been the Indigenous peoples of the Arctic, such as the Inuit, Yupik, and Saami, who are particularly vulnerable. Traditional livelihoods, including hunting, fishing, and reindeer herding, are threatened by changes in ice conditions, wildlife migration patterns, and habitat availability. Additionally, thawing permafrost can damage infrastructure and contaminate water sources, posing health and safety risks to communities.

Small island Developing States are particularly vulnerable to climate change. Partly this was attributed to their low adaptive capacity and the high costs of adaptation in proportion to their GDP. Climate change leads to more frequent and intense extreme weather events such as hurricanes, typhoons, and cyclones. Small islands are especially susceptible to these events, which can cause widespread destruction, loss of life, and economic setbacks.

In comparison, the climate vulnerability of Europe is lower than in developing countries. This was attributed to Europe's high GNP, stable growth, stable population, and well-developed political, institutional, and technological support systems.

== Vulnerability to Extreme Climate Hazards ==
While climate vulnerability encompasses gradual environmental shifts such as sea-level rise, a major sub-category focuses on vulnerability to extreme weather and climate events, including sever heatwaves, droughts, and extreme precipitations leading to floods for example. Unlike slow-onset changes, extreme hydroclimatic hazards represents sudden, acute shocks that demand high short-term adaptative capacity and robust emergency response mechanisms.

== See also ==
- Climate Vulnerability Monitor
- Effects of climate change
- Effects of climate change on human health
