= Homeless Vulnerability Index =

Public health methodology

The Vulnerability Index is a survey and analysis methodology for "identifying and prioritizing the street homeless population for housing according to the fragility of their health". It is a pragmatic methodology based on concern and inquiry into the reasons for recurring fatalities of homeless living in the outdoor urban context. It was developed by Jim O'Connell of Boston Health Care for the Homeless Program.

According to its proponents, his work succeeded in pinpointing the health problems that led to homeless persons being "most at risk for dying on the street". He lists eight conditions, in medical terminology called "markers". According to Common Ground, a national organization to house the homeless, 40% of the Boston mortality was attributable to those factors.

In its formulation as currently promulgated by Common Ground, the index includes these factors: hospitalizations/emergency department visits in a year, age, HIV-AIDS, liver disease or kidney disease, history of frostbite, immersion foot, or hypothermia, and tri-morbidity. Tri-morbidity is co-occurring disorder (psychiatric, substance abuse) with a chronic medical condition.

A national drive is underway by Common Ground to piggy back data collection for the VI onto the bi-annual homeless enumeration count mandated for communities participating in the Continuum of Care grant program of the US Department of Housing and Urban Development. Its proponents contend that such demand side data will assist in placements and getting needy individuals off the street, whereas critics argue that it is intrusive and not likely to lead to increased supply of housing.

The Vulnerability Index has been used outside of the north eastern United States. Cities include Charlotte, North Carolina, Albuquerque, New Mexico, Santa Monica, California. Los Angeles, California, Santa Barbara, California, New Orleans, Louisiana, and Chicago, Illinois. By June 2011, it had also been deployed in various cities in Australia.

== Antecedent use of the concept ==
A vulnerability index for the environmental concerns was developed by the South Pacific Applied Geoscience Commission (SOPAC) with the United Nations Environment Programme (UNEP). They noted that the concept of vulnerability could be applied to various "levels or issues". They specifically noted that it could be applied to "a single issue... or to assess a complex entity such as a country." In sociological research, a distinction is made between indexes and scales. The former often weights variables equally but in any case does not register patterns of data. A scale on the other hand presents a structure in which certain patterns of the variables tend to aggregate at one end of the scale and go together in ascending order.

=== Earliest use ===
Papers associated with Small independent developing societies research used the term "vulnerability index" long before its adoption by O'Connell. United Nations – DPCSD (1997). This took two forms; the term was used in combination with a qualifier. Examples are "environmental vulnerability index" and "Economic Vulnerability Index". However, the raw term "Vulnerability Index" appeared in an epinonymous background paper cited by Professor Lino Briguglio, University of Malta, an expert on "the development of indices for measuring the economic and environmental vulnerability of small island developing states".

=== Critique of the Index ===
There are critics of the index that suggest that it is overly positivistic and reductivist – reducing the experience of homelessness by those persons to counts, numbers and statistics. Instead critics suggest more nuanced information from the disenfranchised and more varied perspectives on the homelessness issue be included in assessment of needs. For example, feminists and qualitative input. The suggestion is that the research relies too heavily on "experts" and governmental organizations and think-tanks. The Ontario Coalition Against Poverty was openly critical of the homogenizing effects the survey could lead to as it was employed to shape homelessness services policies, leading to a reductive and overly simplistic approach to meeting this population's needs.

The index is also credited, erroneously perhaps, on reducing homelessness where we see comments like "The launch of the 100,000 Homes Campaign by Common Ground has since given communities across the country innovative new methods and tools to house our homeless neighbors. One such tool is the Vulnerability Index." The tool then is being conflated with an increase in the housing of the most vulnerable and chronically homeless persons. However, it is the use of the tool within the context of a model of Housing First that appears to be the vehicle that shapes the experience and perceptions of homeless persons by the outreach workers administering the VI and it is this change that further motivates those outreach workers to assist these homeless persons into housing proper. Accordingly, the index itself it not the tool that moves persons out of homelessness it is their assessment of vulnerability taken into and within the model of housing first, brought to a systematized program of intake that values and makes that VI score a priority over other kinds of evidence that may or may not be included in that assessment. Evidence on how the VI could be contributing to changes in affective experience by outreach workers of homelessness persons risk assessment then needs documentation to verify that experiential profiling is not leading to self-selection and lack of validity of the tool in its current application framework.
