= TCCC =

TCCC may refer to:

- Taichung City Council, a city council in Taiwan
- The Coca-Cola Company, a Fortune 500 company
- The Commonwealth Coast Conference, an NCAA Division III–affiliated athletic conference in eastern New England
- The Tarawa Climate Change Conference, an international diplomatic conference held in Kiribati in November 2010
- The Technical Committee on Computer Communications, a Technical Committee that is part of the IEEE Communications Society that sponsors research efforts and standardization in computer communications.
- The Technical Committee on Computer Communications, a Technical Committee that is part of the IEEE Computer Society that sponsors research efforts and standardization in computer communications.
- Tactical Combat Casualty Care, a standard of care in prehospital battlefield medicine.
