= Ambo Declaration =

The Ambo Declaration was adopted at the Tarawa Climate Change Conference on 10 November 2010 by Australia, Brazil, China, Cuba, Fiji, Japan, Kiribati, Maldives, Marshall Islands, New Zealand, Solomon Islands and Tonga. The declaration calls for more and immediate action to be undertaken to address the causes and adverse impacts of climate change. The Ambo Declaration, named after the village in Kiribati where parliament sits, was slated to be a non-legally-binding agreement between the nations to present at the larger international climate change summit, COP16 in Cancun, Mexico.

The United States, the United Kingdom and Canada, who also attended the conference, chose not to be part of the declaration by taking Observer status.

The purpose of the conference was to support the initiative of the President of Kiribati, Anote Tong, to hold a consultative forum between vulnerable states and their partners with a view of creating an enabling environment for multi-party negotiations under the auspices of the United Nations Framework Convention on Climate Change. The conference was a successor event to the Climate Vulnerable Forum first held in November 2009 in the Maldives, when eleven climate vulnerable countries signed the Bandos Island declaration pledging to show moral leadership and commence greening their economies by voluntarily committing to achieving carbon neutrality. Based on the lessons learned in the COP process, the TCCC proposed a more inclusive format of consultations, involving key partners among major developed and developing nations. The ultimate objective of TCCC was to reduce the number and intensity of various fault lines between parties to the COP process, explore elements of agreement between the parties and thereby to support Kiribati's and other parties' contribution to COP16 to be held in Cancun, Mexico, from 29 November to 10 December 2010.

== See also ==
- Tarawa Climate Change Conference
- Climate Vulnerable Forum
