= DARA (international organization) =

Organization based in Madrid, Spain

- Founded: 2003; 23 years ago
- Founder: Silvia Hidalgo
- Purpose: Humanitarian assistance, aid effectiveness, evaluations
- Location: Madrid, Spain
- Region served: Global Organisation
- Method: Analysis, evaluation, research, monitoring
- Website: daraint.org

DARA (Development Assistance Research Associates, Ltd.) is an independent, international organization based in Madrid, Spain. DARA was established in 2003 by Silvia Hidalgo to assess the impact of humanitarian aid and to make specific recommendations for changes in policies and practices. DARA has carried out evaluations in more than 60 crises countries for a variety of organizations including United Nations agencies, the International Federation of Red Cross and Red Crescent Societies, the European Commission, governments and non-governmental organizations (NGOs).

DARA is registered as in independent non-profit organization in Spain, has 501(c)(3) status in the United States and is recognized as an international organization in Switzerland.

== Activities ==
The organization conducts evaluations of development and humanitarian operations, policies, strategies, projects and programs.

DARA works in various regions. Some of the larger projects DARA has undertaken include participation in the Tsunami Evaluation Coalition, after the 2004 disaster in South East Asia; the creation of the Humanitarian Response Index; and the evaluation of the European Commission's Disaster preparedness Plans in Central America.

=== Evaluation and technical assistance ===
- Real-time evaluations meant to assist decision-making while a humanitarian crisis is still unfolding.
- Strategic technical assistance for aid policies and programs.
- System-wide evaluations that identify the policies and measures that humanitarians need to address to ensure enhanced performance and impact of humanitarian aid.

=== Humanitarian Response Index (HRI) ===
The HRI is an independent assessment of donor performance, to assist the Organisation for Economic Co-operation and Development's Development Assistance Committee (OECD/DAC) government donors in ensuring that their humanitarian funding has impact for people in critical need of aid. The HRI measures the individual performance of government donors against Good Humanitarian Donorship Principles drafted in recent years by various United Nations, public and private stakeholders. The 2010 edition was launched in December 2010 in Brussels, Belgium at the European Development Days event.

=== Climate Vulnerability Monitor ===
Co-published by DARA and the Climate Vulnerable Forum, the Climate Vulnerability Monitor was initiated in 2009 by the Government of the Maldives, the "Climate Vulnerability Monitor" provides an overview of countries' susceptibility to short-term climate change (in 2010 and 2030), by using a barometer to assess the estimated effects on each country's health, weather disasters, human habitat loss and economic stresses. The 2010 report was presented at the UN Cancun Summit in December, 2010.

=== Risk Reduction Initiative ===
This program examines factors and conditions that contribute to the generation of risk. It is meant to provides guidance for effective risk reduction in vulnerable and hazard-prone areas across the world. Findings and lessons learned from the Humanitarian Response Index are used to create a Risk Reduction Index (RRI), meant to measure the effectiveness of risk management policies, strategies and activities for reducing the impact of natural disasters on local communities. Its stated aim is to promote learning and sharing of lessons from risk reduction interventions.

== Leadership ==
DARA was founded by Silvia Hidalgo in 2003 and served as the Director General of DARA until January 2010. Ross Mountain, former Deputy Special Representative of the United Nations Secretary General, Humanitarian Coordinator and Resident Coordinator for the UN system for the Democratic Republic of the Congo, served as Director General of DARA from January 2010 until December 2012. A former Chief Executive is Ed Schenkenberg.

=== Board of trustees ===
- Diego Hidalgo Schnur – Chairman Emeritus
- Jose Maria Figueres – Chairman
- Silvia Hidalgo – Vice Chair
- Niels Dabelstein
- Jemilah Mahmood
- Martha Maznevski
- José Manuel Romero Moreno

==== Former board members ====
- Jan Eliasson
- Emma Bonino
- Aldo Ajello
- Beatriz Iraburu Elizondo
- Juliet Pierce

=== In the United States ===
- Michael Dixon
- James Bishop
- Harry Cohen-Bensimon
- Jose Maria Figueres
- Steven Hansch
- Susan Martin

== Funding ==
DARA receives funding from a variety of sources including the United Nations Children's Fund (UNICEF), the World Food Programme (WFP), the Danish Institute for International Studies (DIIS), the Agencia Española de Cooperación Internacional para el Desarrollo (AECID), and the United Nations Development Programme (UNDP). It also receives private funding from individuals and foundations (AVINA Foundation, Agility, Concordia 21).

== See also ==
- Humanitarian aid
- Development aid
- Non-governmental organization
- Sustainability
- Climate change
- Adaptation to global warming
