= Diego Hidalgo =

Diego Hidalgo may refer to:

- Diego Hidalgo (tennis) (born 1993), Ecuadorian tennis player
- Diego Hidalgo y Durán (1886–1961), Spanish intellectual, entrepreneur, and politician during the Spanish Second Republic
- Diego Hidalgo Schnur (born 1942), his son, Spanish intellectual, philanthropist, and businessman
