= Humanitarian Response Index =

Ranking of countries by humanitarian assistance commitment

The Humanitarian Response Index (HRI) is an independent civil society initiative to annually assess and rank wealthy countries against their commitment to improve the quality and effectiveness of their humanitarian assistance. Developed by DARA (formerly, Development Assistance Research Associates), the HRI's intended purpose is to assist the Organisation for Economic Co-operation and Development's Development Assistance Committee (OECD/DAC) donor governments ensure that their humanitarian assistance has the greatest impact on beneficiaries. The HRI's aim is to improve the quality and effectiveness of aid, and promote greater efficiency, effectiveness, transparency and accountability of government donors. The first edition was published in 2007, followed by subsequent editions in 2008, 2009, and 2010.

== Context ==
As the principal providers of humanitarian assistance, the OECD/DAC donor governments agreed to a set of Good Humanitarian Donorship (GHD) Principles, according to the Good Humanitarian Donorship Initiative started in 2003.

== Objectives ==
DARA created the HRI to complement other initiatives in the sector. The main aims of the HRI are to contribute to ongoing efforts to improve the quality of humanitarian aid and ensure that it is used to assist those most in need in the most effective way possible, and with the greatest possible impact.

Specifically, the HRI objectives are:

- To measure and benchmark the quality and effectiveness of donor governments' humanitarian assistance
- To contribute to greater transparency and accountability in donors' policies and practices
- To support a better contextual understanding of the policy and operational barriers that affect effective implementation of good donor practice in humanitarian action
- To promote informed public debate and decision-making on humanitarian issues

== Methodology ==
DARA recently revised its methodology for the 2010 edition. To develop the donor rankings, DARA compiles data from different sources, including donors, the OECD, the World Bank and UN agencies. DARA teams also conduct field research on the ground in countries that experience crises in the year of study. Interviews are undertaken with representatives of humanitarian organizations operating in these countries. This quantitative and qualitative information is combined, and the performance of each donor country according to 35 indicators that aim to capture the essence of the GHD Principles. These indicators are grouped into five pillars of good practice to measure the quality, effectiveness and impact of humanitarian action – (i) Responding to needs; (ii) Prevention, risk reduction and recovery; (iii) Working with humanitarian partners; (iv) Protection and international law; and (v) Learning and accountability.

Field missions have been conducted in Afghanistan, Bangladesh, Bolivia, Cameroon, the Central African Republic, Chad, China, Colombia, the Democratic Republic of the Congo, Ethiopia, Georgia, Haiti, India, Indonesia, Iran, Jamaica, Kenya, Laos, Lebanon, Myanmar, Nicaragua, Niger, Nigeria, the occupied Palestinian territory, Pakistan, Peru, the Philippines, Somalia, South Sudan, Sri Lanka, Sudan, Syria, Timor-Leste, Vietnam, Yemen and Zimbabwe.
