= Ross Mountain =

New Zealand humanitarian (born 1944)

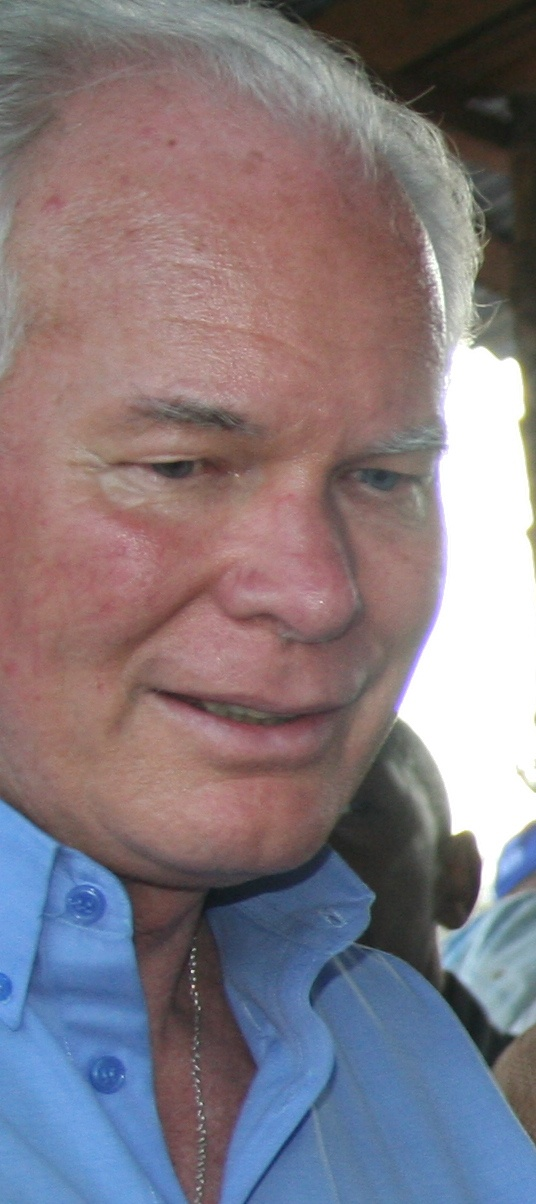
Ross Mountain in 2009

Ross Stewart Mountain (born in Christchurch, New Zealand in 1944) has spent most of his career in the service of the United Nations working on humanitarian, recovery, development and peacekeeping operations in Asia, Africa, the Middle East, the Caribbean, and the Pacific as well as assignments based in Geneva, Switzerland promoting non-governmental action and managing UN humanitarian operations.

Most recently he was based in the Executive Office of the Secretary General in New York as Assistant Secretary General and Senior Advisor on Cholera in Haiti. Previously he served as the UN Resident Coordinator, Humanitarian Coordinator, UNDP Resident Representative, UNFPA Representative and UN Deputy Special Coordinator in Lebanon and carried out special assignments to Myanmar, Afghanistan and Haiti .

He also served at the Assistant Secretary General level as Deputy Special Representative of the [Secretary General] of the United Nations in [the Democratic Republic of the Congo] for five years following his appointed by the Secretary General on 18 November 2004.

In DRC he also fulfilled the functions of Humanitarian Coordinator, Resident Coordinator of the United Nations Development System, and Resident Representative of the United Nations Development Programme (UNDP). As Deputy Special Representative of the Secretary General he was one of the top three officials in the United Nations Peacekeeping Mission in the DRC, MONUC, the then-largest UN mission in the world. He was responsible for managing the largest and most challenging UN election operation ever undertaken by the United Nations in 2006 in Congo, which brought Joseph Kabila to power.

== Biography ==
=== Career ===
Prior to his assignment in Congo, Mountain replaced Sergio Vieira De Mello, the UN Commissioner for Human Rights, at the time serving as a Special Representative of the Secretary General in Iraq who was killed in Baghdad by a terrorist attack on the UN Headquarters on 19 August 2003. Mountain was appointed by Kofi Annan, the United Nations Secretary General at the time, as Special Representative for the Secretary General ad interim on 10 December 2003. During this period, he also served as United Nations Resident Coordinator and Humanitarian Coordinator, and the United Nations Development Programme (UNDP) Resident Representative in Iraq.

From August 1998 to December 2003, Mountain served as Assistant Emergency Relief Coordinator and Director of the Geneva Office of the United Nations Office for the Coordination of Humanitarian Affairs (OCHA). In this capacity, he served as Chair of the Inter-Agency Standing Committee Working Group and served as the Secretary-General's special representative on a number of humanitarian missions, including during the East Timor crisis (1999), the floods in Mozambique (2000) and the humanitarian crisis in Liberia (2003).

In October 2002, Mountain led an inter-agency technical assessment mission to the West Bank and Gaza to prepare a humanitarian plan of action. In 2003, Mountain headed the OCHA Crisis Task Team for Iraq, in which capacity he visited that country in July 2003 to review the humanitarian programme.

Prior to his appointment to OCHA, Mountain served as United Nations Resident Coordinator and UNDP Resident Representative in Lebanon from 1995 to 1998. In 1996, he coordinated the United Nations response to the "Grapes of Wrath" Israeli military intervention and the ensuing humanitarian situation. His other United Nations assignments included United Nations Humanitarian Affairs Coordinator in Haiti (1994-1995), United Nations Resident Coordinator for the Eastern Caribbean (1993-1994), United Nations Special Coordinator for Emergency Relief Operations in Liberia (1991-1993), UNDP Resident Representative a.i. in Afghanistan (1988-1991), and UNDP Deputy Resident Representative in the South Pacific (1985-1988). He earlier worked in Geneva as Chief of the Information Section in the UNDP. His first United Nations assignment was in 1973 as Inter-Agency Youth Liaison Officer in the Division of Social Affairs in Geneva. He founded the United Nations' Non Governmental Liaison Service (NGLS) in Geneva in 1975.

From January 2010 to December 2012, Mountain served as Director General of DARA (international organization), an independent humanitarian think tank based in Madrid, Spain.

=== Personal life ===
Mountain graduated from the Victoria University of Wellington with a degree in Asian Studies and Political Science. He was awarded the university's Distinguished Alumni award in October 2007. He has also received the Lebanese Republic's medal of honor in 1998, awarded by President Elias Hrawi, Head of State in Lebanon at the time.

Mountain was President of the Auckland University Students' Association in 1965, and elected the first full-time President of the New Zealand University Students' Association (NZUSA) in 1966 and 1967.

Mountain was married to Brigitte Khair, a Lebanese-American from 2001 to 2018. Together they have three daughters, Sasha, Andrea and Monya.
