= Tarawa Climate Change Conference =

2010 I-Kiribati conference

The Tarawa Climate Change Conference (TCCC), was held in the Republic of Kiribati from 9 to 10 November 2010. The purpose of the conference was to support the initiative of the President of Kiribati, Anote Tong, to hold a consultative forum between vulnerable states and their partners with a view of creating an enabling environment for multi-party negotiations under the auspices of the UNFCCC. The conference was the successor event to the Climate Vulnerable Forum held in November 2009 in the Maldives, when eleven climate vulnerable countries signed the Bandos Island declaration pledging to show moral leadership and commence greening their economies by voluntarily committing to achieving carbon neutrality. Based on the lessons learned in the COP process, the TCCC proposed a more inclusive format of consultations, involving key partners among major developed and developing nations.

The TCCC was an advocacy and partnership building event embedded in the overall context of global and regional (Pacific) consultations on climate change. Furthermore, the TCCC aimed to be an integral part of the process of regional and global consultations scheduled in 2010.

The ultimate objective of TCCC was to reduce the number and intensity of various fault lines between parties to the COP process, explore elements of agreement between the parties and thereby to support Kiribati's and other parties' contribution to COP16 to be held in Cancun, Mexico, from 29 November to 10 December 2010.

== Outcome ==
The Ambo declaration was adopted at the Tarawa Climate Change Conference on 10 November 2010 by Australia, Brazil, China, Cuba, Fiji, Japan, Kiribati, Maldives, Marshall Islands, New Zealand, Solomon Islands and Tonga. The declaration calls for more and immediate action to be undertaken to address the causes and adverse impacts of climate change. The United States, the United Kingdom and Canada, who also attended the conference, chose not to be part of the declaration by taking Observer status.

== Attending parties ==
China, Canada, India, the United States, Britain, the European Union, Japan, New Zealand, Australia and most Pacific Island countries

=== TCCC Host ===
Kiribati

=== COP16 Host ===
Mexico

=== Climate Vulnerable Forum (CVF) ===
Maldives, Bangladesh

=== Pacific Small Island Developing States (SIDS) ===
Vanuatu, Tuvalu, Marshall Islands

=== Least Developed Countries (LDC) ===
Lesotho, Solomon Islands

=== Alliance of Small Island States (AOSIS) ===
Grenada

=== G77 ===
Yemen

=== Developed countries and EU ===
Australia, European Union, France, Japan, New Zealand, United Kingdom, United States of America

=== Developing countries (BASIC) ===
Brazil, India, People's Republic of China, South Africa

=== Technical support ===
UNDP, PREVENT Project (Potsdam Institute for Climate Impact Research), other facilitators

=== Observers ===
UNFCCC Secretariat, IPCC, FAO, PIFS, SPREP, Secretariat of the Pacific Community (SPC), World Bank, Greenpeace/WWF, Pacific Conference of Churches, Pacific Calling Partnership, Pacific Association of Non-Governmental Organizations (PIANGO)

=== International media ===
AAP (Aus), NPR (US), The Guardian (UK) and others

== See also ==
- Climate Vulnerable Forum
