= Climate Vulnerability Monitor =

- Author: DARA Climate Vulnerable Forum
- Language: English
- Published: 2010

The Climate Vulnerability Monitor (CVM) is an independent global assessment of the effect of climate change on the world's populations brought together by panels of key international authorities. The Monitor was launched in December 2010 in London and Cancun to coincide with the UN Cancun Summit on climate change (COP-16). Developed by DARA and the Climate Vulnerable Forum, the report is meant to serve as a new tool to assess global vulnerability to various effects of climate change within different nations.

The report distills leading science and research for a clearer explanation of how and where populations are being affected by climate change today (2010) and in the near future (2030), while pointing to key actions that reduce these impacts.

DARA and the Climate Vulnerable Forum launched the 2nd edition of the Climate Vulnerability Monitor on 26 September 2012 at the Asia Society, New York.

== Objectives ==
The Climate Vulnerability Monitor attempts to demonstrate how each country is vulnerable to climate change (for health reasons, extreme weather patterns, economic factors, land loss from expanding deserts or rising sea levels). It lists over 50 measures that the authors claim are readily available to limit virtually all harm caused by climate change.

== Approach ==
The Climate Vulnerability Monitor reportedly takes a new approach to assessing the climate vulnerability of the world and its regions, countries and communities. The Monitor looks at pre-existing characteristics of society that are affected by climate change and maps the level of vulnerability and expected impact as implied by the effect that real or projected changes in the climate. The analysis is built around 4 "impact areas", and 5 "levels of vulnerability", focusing on the years 2010 and 2030.

According to the report, the estimated figures of impacts are yielded from the Monitor’s specific methodology and represent additional impacts due to climate change. They give a "snapshot" of what is expected to already be taking place and what might occur in the near future. According to the authors, the Monitor represents just one possible way of measuring climate vulnerability that they expect can be improved upon.

4 Climate Impact Areas Addressed

- Health Impact - additional mortality from climate-sensitive diseases
- Weather Disasters - additional mortality and damage in storms, floods and wildfires
- Habitat Loss - additional loss of human habitat to rising sea levels, desertification
- Economic Stress - extra losses in the primary/agricultural sectors of the economy and key natural resources

5 Climate Vulnerability Factors

- Acute (most vulnerable category)
- Severe
- High
- Moderate
- Low (least vulnerable category)

== Findings ==
=== Climate Vulnerability Monitor 2010 ===
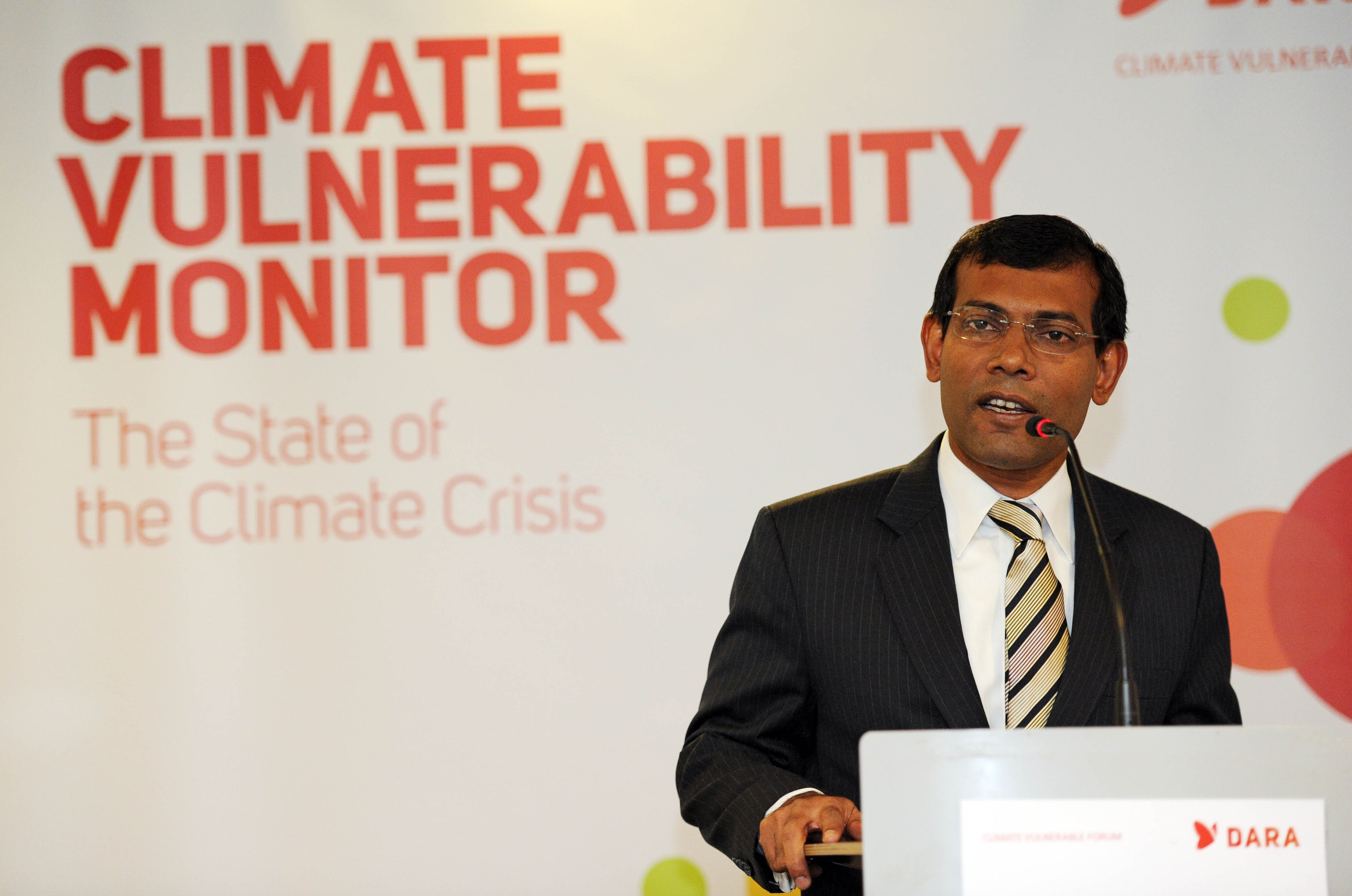
Mohamed Nasheed, President of the Maldives, at the presentation of the Climate Vulnerability Monitor in London, December 3, 2010

The report claims that climate change fuelled by human activities is already interfering with the climate, leading to effects that are dangerous for people and the planet. According to the report, the rate of change and effects of heat, wind, rain, deserts, sea level, and other impacts result in 350,000 deaths per year. The report states that the effects of climate change could contribute to the deaths of 5 million people by 2020 and cause as many as 1 million deaths per year by 2030 if global warming isn't slowed. Heat, wind, and water shortages put pressure on the habitat of approximately 2.5 million people. Storms, floods, and wildfires are estimated to leave an additional $5 billion in damage each year, while rising seas cost 1% of GDP to the lowest-income countries – 4% in the Pacific – with 65 billion dollars annually lost from the world economy.

The report further states that most impacts are highly concentrated on children and the poor with the majority of the death toll is concentrated on children living in Sub-Saharan Africa or South Asia, and that gradual, not sudden, impacts from climate change causes more than 90% of all damage. Over 80% of people at risk from climate-caused desertification reside in high-growth emerging economies such as China and India.

The report also states that half of the economic impacts of climate change are felt in industrialized countries. However, developing countries suffer much greater relative stresses to their economies, mainly due to larger, less robust agricultural sectors. Just 15 countries are considered acutely vulnerable to climate change today, collectively suffering nearly half of all climate impacts. Recognized fragile states or failed states like Afghanistan, Haiti, Myanmar, Sierra Leone, and Somalia are among the worst affected. An average of just 24 countries are assessed as having the most severe factor of vulnerability for each main impact area of health, extreme weather, habitat loss, and economic stress. In every case, some two thirds of the total global impact falls on just 10 countries.

The report states that 20 more years of inaction could lead to nearly 1 million climate-related deaths each year by 2030. The number of acutely vulnerable countries could more than triple over that period. Economic costs could increase to $100 billion of stress on the world’s coastlines, $150 billion worth of primary-sector and natural resource losses, and $10 billion in storm, flood, and wildfire damages—a third of a trillion dollar annual economic crisis.

== History ==
DARA and the Climate Vulnerable Forum created the Climate Vulnerability Monitor to advance understanding of the growing negative effects of climate change on society and to identify a variety of key options to meet this new challenge.

The Climate Vulnerable Forum is a global partnership of leaders of countries most vulnerable to climate change actively seeking a firm and urgent resolution to the growing climate crisis. It was founded by President Mohamed Nasheed of the Maldives and first met in November 2009. The Declaration of the Climate Vulnerable Forum adopted then expressed alarm at the rate of changes and danger witnessed around the planet due to the effects of anthropogenic global warming and called for urgent international cooperation to tackle the challenge. The countries include Bangladesh, Barbados, Bhutan, Kiribati, Ghana, Kenya, Nepal, Rwanda, Tanzania, Vietnam and Maldives.

DARA is an international organization based in Madrid, Spain, and founded in 2003 by Silvia Hidalgo. According to its website, the organization aims to improve the quality and effectiveness of aid for vulnerable populations suffering from conflict, disasters, and climate change.

== See also ==
- Climate Vulnerable Forum
- Environmental Vulnerability Index

== Documents ==
Climate Vulnerability Monitor 2010: The State of the Climate Crisis

- CVM 2012 Complete Text
- CVM 2010 Complete Text
- CVM 2010 Executive Summary - English
- CVM 2010 Executive Summary - Spanish
