= Environmental Vulnerability Index =

Measure of severity of environmental issues

The Environmental Vulnerability Index (EVI) is a measurement devised by the South Pacific Applied Geoscience Commission (SOPAC), the United Nations Environment Program and others to characterize the relative severity of various types of environmental issues suffered by 243 enumerated individual nations and other geographies (such as Antarctica). The results of the EVI are used to focus on planned solutions to negative pressures on the environment, whilst promoting sustainability.

== Development ==
The beginning stages of the Environmental Vulnerability Index (EVI) were developed to be appropriate for Small Island Developing States (SIDs), this theoretical idea at the time was presented by the South Pacific Applied Geoscience Commission (SOPAC) on February 4, 1999. The ideas and plans for The Environmental Vulnerability Index were worked on further with the creation of a (EVI) Think Tank that took place from September 7–10, 1999 in Pacific Harbour, Fiji. Expanding the (EVI) to other SIDS was aided by a meeting of experts convened in Malta on November 29 – December 3, 1999 by (SOPAC) and the Foundation for International Studies (of the University of Malta's Islands and Small States Institute) with the support of the United Nations Environment Programme (UNEP).

During the second phase of the development, the Environmental Vulnerability Index (EVI) was tested in five countries. A workshop was made to expand the application of the Environmental Vulnerability Index to a demonstrative set of countries from around the world. The workshop was hosted by UNEP in Geneva, Switzerland on August 27 – August 29, 2001. Continuation of work and development on The Environmental Vulnerability Index, led to a presentation of the first functional results with the Demonstration EVI.

== Calculation ==
To be able to calculate an Environmental Vulnerability Index it requires the compilation of relevant environmental vulnerability data for the 50 indicators. Once compiled then this data must be used to calculate each indicator. As the indicators are heterogeneous, include variables for which responses are numerical, qualitative and on different scales (linear, non-linear, or with different ranges) they are mapped onto a 1–7 vulnerability scale. Where data is not available, no value is given for the indicator and the denominator of the average adjusted down by one value. Where an indicator is considered 'non-applicable' in a country (such as volcanic eruptions in Tuvalu which has no volcanoes), the lowest vulnerability score of 1 is attributed to that indicator. The vulnerability scores for each indicator are then accumulated either into categories or sub-indices and the average calculated. An overall average of all indicators is calculated to generate the country EVI. The EVI is accumulated into three sub-indices: Hazards, Resistance, Damage

The 50 EVI indicators are also divided up in the issue categories for use as required: Climate change, Biodiversity, Water, Agriculture and fisheries, Human health aspects, Desertification, and Exposure to Natural Disasters.

== Indicators ==
1. High Winds – Average annual excess winds over the last five years (summing speeds on days during which the maximum recorded wind speed is greater than 20% higher than the 30 year average maximum wind speed for that month) averaged over all reference climate stations.
2. Dry Periods – Average annual rainfall deficit (mm) over the past 5 years for all months with more than 20% lower rainfall than the 30 year monthly average, averaged over all reference climate stations.
3. Wet Periods – Average annual excess rainfall (mm) over the past 5 years for all months with more than 20% higher rainfall than the 30 year monthly average, averaged over all reference climate stations
4. Hot Periods – Average annual excess heat (degrees C) over the past 5 years for all days more than 5^{°}C (9^{°}F) hotter than the 30 year mean monthly maximum, averaged over all reference climate stations.
5. Cold Periods – Average annual heat deficit (degrees C) over the past 5 years for all days more than 5^{°}C (9^{°}F) cooler than the 30 year mean monthly minimum, averaged overall reference climate stations.
6. Sea Temperatures – Average annual deviation in Sea Surface Temperatures (SST) in the last 5 years in relation to the 30 year monthly means
7. Volcanoes – Cumulative volcano risk as the weighted number of volcanoes with the potential for eruption greater than or equal to a Volcanic Explosively Index of 2 (VEI 2) within 100 km of the country land boundary (divided by the area of land).
8. Earthquakes – Cumulative earthquake energy within 100 km of country land boundaries measured as Local Magnitude (ML) ≥ 6.0 and occurring at a depth of less than or equal to fifteen kilometers(≤15 km depth) over 5 years (divided by land area).
9. Tsunamis – Number of tsunamis or storms surges with run-up greater than 2 meters above Mean High Water Spring tide (MHWS) per 1000 km coastline since 1900.
10. Slides – Number of slides recorded in the last 5 years (EMDAT definitions), divided by land area
11. Land Area – Total land area (km2)
12. Country Dispersion – Ratio of length of borders (land and maritime) to total land area.
13. Isolation – Distance to nearest continent (km)
14. Relief – Altitude range (highest point subtracted from the lowest point in country)
15. Lowlands – Percentage of land area less than or equal to 50m above sea level
16. Borders – Number of land and sea borders (including EEZ shared with other countries.)
17. Ecosystem Imbalance – Weighted average change in trophic level since fisheries began (for trophic level slice ≤3.35).
18. Environmental Openness – Average annual USD freight imports over the past 5 years by any means per km2 land area
19. Migrations – Number of known species that migrate outside the territorial area at any time during their life spans (including land and all aquatic species) / area of land
20. Endemics – Number of known endemic species per million square kilometer land area
21. Introductions – Number of introduced species per 1000 square kilometer of land area
22. Endangered Species – Number of endangered and vulnerable species per 1000 km^{2} land area (IUCN definitions)
23. Extinctions – Number of species known to have become extinct since 1900 per 1000 km^{2} land area (IUCN definitions)
24. Vegetation Cover – Percentage of natural and regrowth vegetation cover remaining (include forests, wetlands, prairies, tundra, desert and alpine associations).
25. Loss Of Cover – Net percentage change in natural vegetation cover over the last five years
26. Habitat fragmentation – Total length of all roads in a country divided by land area.
27. Degradation – Percent of land area that is either severely or very severely degraded (FAO/AGL Terrastat definitions)
28. Terrestrial Reserves – Percent of terrestrial land area legally set aside as no take reserves
29. Marine Reserves – Percentage of continental shelf legally designated as marine protected areas (MPAs).
30. Intensive Farming – Annual tonnage of intensively farmed animal products (includes aquaculture, pigs, poultry) produced over the last five years per square kilometer land area.
31. Fertilizers – Average annual intensity of fertilizer use over the total land area over the last 5 years.
32. Pesticides – Average annual pesticides used as kg/km^{2}/year over total land area over last 5 years.
33. Biotechnology – Cumulative number of deliberate field trials of genetically modified organisms conducted in the country since 1986.
34. Productivity Over-fishing – Average ratio of productivity : fisheries catch over the last 5 years
35. Fishing Effort – Average annual number of fishers per kilometer of coastline over the last 5 years
36. Renewable Water – Average annual water usage as percentage of renewable water resources over the last 5 years
37. SO_{2} Emissions – Average annual SO_{2} emissions over the last 5 years.
38. Generated and imported toxic, hazardous and municipal wastes per square kilometer land area over the last 5 years
39. Waste Treatment – Mean annual percent of hazardous, toxic and municipal waste effectively managed and treated over the past 5 years.
40. Industry – Average annual use of electricity for industry over the last 5 years per square kilometer of land
41. Spills – Total number of spills of oil and hazardous substances greater than 1000 liters on land, in rivers or within territorial waters per million km maritime coast during the last five years
42. Mining – Average annual mining production (include all surface and subsurface mining and quarrying) per km2 of land area over the past 5 years.
43. Sanitation – Density of population without access to safe sanitation (WHO definitions)
44. Vehicles – Number of vehicles per square kilometer of land area (most recent data)
45. Population – Total human population density (number per km^{2} land area)
46. Population Growth – Annual human population growth rate over the last 5 years
47. Tourists Average annual number of international tourists per km2 land over the past 5 years.
48. Coastal Settlements – Density of people living in coastal settlements, i.e. with a city center within 100 km of any maritime or lake* coast.
49. Environmental Agreements – Number of environmental treaties in force in a country.
50. Conflicts – Average number of conflict years per decade within the country over the past 50 years.

== List ==
Rank	Country	Index	Bracket
1	French Guiana	174	Resilient
2	Western Sahara	175	Resilient
3	Botswana	181	Resilient
4	Central African Republic	193	Resilient
5	Namibia	200	Resilient
6	Zimbabwe	200	Resilient
7	Guyana	207	Resilient
8	Mongolia	208	Resilient
9	Niger	208	Resilent
10	Djibouti	210	Resilient
11	Zambia	210	Resilient
12	Gabon	211	Resilient
13	Suriname	211	Resilient
14	Kazakhstan	215	At risk
15	Mali	215	At risk
16	Svalbard	215	At risk
17	Chad	217	At risk
18	Congo	219	At risk
19	Falkland Islands	223	At risk
20	Mozambique	225	At risk
21	Angola	227	At risk
22	Cameroon	229	At risk
23	Burkina Faso	229	At risk
24	Qatar	229	At risk
25	Mauritania	233	At risk
26	Kyrgyzstan	234	At risk
27	Antarctica	235	At risk
28	Australia	238	At risk
29	Belarus	239	At risk
30	Equatorial Guinea	243	At risk
31	Greenland	243	At risk
32	Laos	243	At risk
33	Swaziland	243	At risk
34	South Georgia and the South Sandwich Islands	245	At risk
35	Panama	247	At risk
36	Armenia	247	At risk
37	Bahamas	248	At risk
38	Cote d'Ivoire	248	At risk
39	Turkmenistan	249	At risk
40	Malawi	249	At risk
41	Oman	250	At risk
42	Bolivia	250	At risk
43	Canada	251	At risk
44	Papua New Guinea	251	At risk
45	Bhutan	253	At risk
46	Eritrea	254	At risk
47	Guinea	254	At risk
48	Libya	256	At risk
49	Andorra	257	At risk
50	Tanzania	257	At risk
51	Belize	258	At risk
52	Uruguay	259	At risk
53	Ethiopia	260	At risk
54	Paraguay	260	At risk
55	Georgia	261	At risk
56	Kenya	262	At risk
57	Finland	265	Vulnerable
58	São Tomé and Príncipe	265	Vulnerable
59	Somalia	265	Vulnerable
60	Peru	268	Vulnerable
61	Cambodia	270	Vulnerable
62	Latvia	270	Vulnerable
63	Myanmar	270	Vulnerable
64	Bouvet Island	271	Vulnerable
65	Guinea-Bissau	271	Vulnerable
66	Liberia	271	Vulnerable
67	Tajikistan	271	Vulnerable
68	Nicaragua	272	Vulnerable
69	Honduras	273	Vulnerable
70	Norway	273	Vulnerable
71	Russia	273	Vulnerable
72	Saudi Arabia	274	Vulnerable
73	Sudan	274	Vulnerable
74	Algeria	275	Vulnerable
75	Comoros	277	Vulnerable
76	Gambia	277	Vulnerable
77	Senegal	277	Vulnerable
78	Benin	278	Vulnerable
79	Ghana	279	Vulnerable
80	Madagascar	279	Vulnerable
81	Saint Helena	279	Vulnerable
82	Lesotho	280	Vulnerable
83	Estonia	280	Vulnerable
84	Morocco	281	Vulnerable
85	Solomon Islands	281	Vulnerable
86	Cape Verde	282	Vulnerable
87	Sierra Leone	283	Vulnerable
88	Uganda	283	Vulnerable
89	Cocos (Keeling) Islands	285	Vulnerable
90	Vanuatu	285	Vulnerable
91	Uzbekistan	286	Vulnerable
92	Argentina	287	Vulnerable
93	Chile	287	Vulnerable
94	Burundi	288	Vulnerable
95	Democratic Republic of the Congo	288	Vulnerable
96	Afghanistan	289	Vulnerable
97	Yemen	289	Vulnerable
98	New Caledonia	290	Vulnerable
99	Aruba	291	Vulnerable
100	Venezuela	291	Vulnerable
101	New Zealand	292	Vulnerable
102	Turks and Caicos Islands	292	Vulnerable
103	Togo	293	Vulnerable
104	United Arab Emirates	293	Vulnerable
105	Vatican City	293	Vulnerable
106	Heard Island and McDonald Islands	294	Vulnerable
107	British Indian Ocean Territory	295	Vulnerable
108	Colombia	296	Vulnerable
109	Faroe Islands	296	Vulnerable
110	Saint Pierre and Miquelon	296	Vulnerable
111	Egypt	298	Vulnerable
112	Iceland	298	Vulnerable
113	Rwanda	298	Vulnerable
114	Jan Mayen	300	Vulnerable
115	United States	300	Vulnerable
116	Slovakia	303	Vulnerable
117	Ecuador	304	Vulnerable
118	Mayotte	304	Vulnerable
119	Pitcairn	304	Vulnerable
120	Wallis and Futuna	304	Vulnerable
121	Nepal	305	Vulnerable
122	San Marino	305	Vulnerable
123	Bosnia & Herzegovina	306	Vulnerable
124	Mexico	306	Vulnerable
125	Tunisia	306	Vulnerable
126	Antigua & Barbuda	307	Vulnerable
127	Thailand	308	Vulnerable
128	Hong Kong	309	Vulnerable
129	Niue	309	Vulnerable
130	Jordan	310	Vulnerable
131	Sweden	311	Vulnerable
132	Anguilla	312	Vulnerable
133	Malaysia	312	Vulnerable
134	Brunei	313	Vulnerable
135	Iran	313	Vulnerable
136	Cyprus	314	Vulnerable
137	Lithuania	314	Vulnerable
138	Czech Republic	315	Vulnerable
139	Grenada	315	Vulnerable
140	Malta	316	Highly vulnerable
141	Indonesia	316	Highly vulnerable
142	North Macedonia	316	Highly vulnerable
143	Ukraine	317	Highly vulnerable
144	Ireland	318	Highly vulnerable
145	Moldova	322	Highly vulnerable
146	Bulgaria	323	Highly vulnerable
147	Kuwait	323	Highly vulnerable
148	Netherlands Antilles	323	Highly vulnerable
149	Dominican Republic	324	Highly vulnerable
150	South Africa	324	Highly vulnerable
151	Taiwan	324	Highly vulnerable
152	Bahrain	326	Highly vulnerable
153	Luxembourg	327	Highly vulnerable
154	Gibraltar	328	Highly vulnerable
155	Samoa	328	Highly vulnerable
156	Tokelau	328	Highly vulnerable
157	Cuba	329	Highly vulnerable
158	Albania	330	Highly vulnerable
159	Sri Lanka	331	Highly vulnerable
160	Monaco	332	Highly vulnerable
161	Fiji	333	Highly vulnerable
162	Puerto Rico	334	Highly vulnerable
163	Portugal	335	Highly vulnerable
164	Romania	335	Highly vulnerable
165	Nigeria	336	Highly vulnerable
166	Saint Vincent and the Grenadines	337	Highly vulnerable
167	Guatemala	338	Highly vulnerable
168	Palau	338	Highly vulnerable
169	Bangladesh	340	Highly vulnerable
170	Réunion	341	Highly vulnerable
171	Montserrat	342	Highly vulnerable
172	Cayman Islands	343	Highly vulnerable
173	Croatia	343	Highly vulnerable
174	Haiti	343	Highly vulnerable
175	Iraq	344	Highly vulnerable
176	Denmark	345	Highly vulnerable
177	Liechtenstein	346	Highly vulnerable
178	El Salvador	348	Highly vulnerable
179	Marshall Islands	348	Highly vulnerable
180	Switzerland	348	Highly vulnerable
181	Christmas Island	350	Highly vulnerable
182	Syria	350	Highly vulnerable
183	Spain	352	Highly vulnerable
184	Greece	353	Highly vulnerable
185	Turkey	353	Highly vulnerable
186	Azerbaijan	354	Highly vulnerable
187	Costa Rica	354	Highly vulnerable
188	Poland	354	Highly vulnerable
189	Seychelles	355	Highly vulnerable
190	Germany	357	Highly vulnerable
191	Vietnam	357	Highly vulnerable
192	Mauritius	358	Highly vulnerable
193	Saint Kitts and Nevis	359	Highly vulnerable
194	China	360	Highly vulnerable
195	France	361	Highly vulnerable
196	Slovenia	362	Highly vulnerable
197	Hungary	363	Highly vulnerable
198	North Korea	363	Highly vulnerable
199	Martinique	364	Highly vulnerable
200	Tuvalu	367	Extremely vulnerable
201	Pakistan	368	Extremely vulnerable
202	Norfolk Island	368	Extremely vulnerable
203	Austria	369	Extremely vulnerable
204	Bermuda	373	Extremely vulnerable
205	South Korea	373	Extremely vulnerable
206	Brazil	373	Extremely vulnerable
207	United Kingdom	373	Extremely vulnerable
208	British Virgin Islands	377	Extremely vulnerable
209	Northern Mariana Islands	378	Extremely vulnerable
210	Israel	380	Extremely vulnerable
211	French Polynesia	381	Extremely vulnerable
212	Jamaica	381	Extremely vulnerable
213	Trinidad and Tobago	381	Extremely vulnerable
214	Cook Islands	383	Extremely vulnerable
215	Maldives	383	Extremely vulnerable
216	India	385	Extremely vulnerable
217	Italy	386	Extremely vulnerable
218	Belgium	387	Extremely vulnerable
219	Lebanon	387	Extremely vulnerable
220	Netherlands	388	Extremely vulnerable
221	Japan	389	Extremely vulnerable
222	Guam	390	Extremely vulnerable
223	Micronesia	392	Extremely vulnerable
224	Tonga	392	Extremely vulnerable
225	Saint Lucia	393	Extremely vulnerable
226	Kiribati	395	Extremely vulnerable
227	United States Virgin Islands	396	Extremely vulnerable
228	Philippines	402	Extremely vulnerable
229	Barbados	403	Extremely vulnerable
230	Macau	407	Extremely vulnerable
231	Guadeloupe	412	Extremely vulnerable
232	Nauru	421	Extremely vulnerable
233	Singapore	428	Extremely vulnerable
234	American Samoa	436	Extremely vulnerable

== See also ==
- Biotic index, a simple measurement of stream pollution and its effects on the biology of the stream.
- Climate Vulnerability Monitor (CVM)
- Environmental Performance Index (EPI)
- Environmental Sustainability Index (ESI)
