= Economic Vulnerability Index =

The Economic Vulnerability Index is one of the criteria used by the United Nations Committee for Development Policy, an advisory body to the United Nations Economic and Social Council, in the identification of Least Developed Countries. It is a composite of eight indicators:

- Population size
- Remoteness
- Merchandise export concentration
- Share of agriculture, forestry and fisheries in gross domestic product
- Homelessness owing to natural disasters
- Instability of agricultural production
- Instability of exports of goods and services
- The share of population living in low elevated coastal zone

The other criteria used to classify countries as Least Developed are gross national income per capita and the Human Asset Index. Only low-income countries with fewer than 75 million inhabitants may be considered for inclusion in the category.

Retrospective series have been also calculated for 1990–2011.
