= Climate Vulnerable Forum =

Global partnership of countries

- Logo of the Climate Vulnerable Forum
- Membership: 74 governments; (11 founding countries)

Leaders
  - Chair: Barbados (2024-2026)
  - Previous chairs: Ghana (2022-2024) Bangladesh (2020-2022) Marshall Islands (2018-2020) Ethiopia (2016–2018) Philippines (2015–2016) Costa Rica (2013–2014) Bangladesh (2011–2013) Kiribati (2010–2011)
  - Founding chair: Maldives (2009–2010)
  - Secretary General: Mohamed Nasheed

Establishment
  - Malé Declaration: 10 November 2009
- Website; CVF-V20.org

The Climate Vulnerable Forum (CVF) is a global partnership of countries that are disproportionately affected by the consequences of climate change. The forum addresses the negative effects of climate change as a result of heightened socioeconomic and environmental vulnerabilities. These countries actively seek a firm and urgent resolution to the current intensification of climate change, domestically and internationally. The CVF was formed to increase the accountability of industrialized nations for the consequences of global climate change. It also aims to exert additional pressure for action to tackle the challenge, which includes the local action by countries considered susceptible. Political leaders involved in this partnership are "using their status as those most vulnerable to climate change to punch far above their weight at the negotiating table". The governments which founded the CVF agree to national commitments to pursue low-carbon development and carbon neutrality.

The Philippines was the Chair of the Climate Vulnerable Forum during the 2015 United Nations Climate Change Conference in Paris (COP21) and oversaw the adoption of the body's Manila-Paris Declaration at the Third High-Level Meeting of the Forum in November 2015. The Manila-Paris Declaration articulated the common concerns and commitments of vulnerable countries and urged the strengthening of the UNFCCC goal of limiting warming to below 1.5 degrees Celsius above pre-industrial levels. During this meeting the membership of the Climate Vulnerable Forum expanded to include 23 new members. Ethiopia became the first African Chair of the Climate Vulnerable Forum during the CVF High-Level Climate Policy Forum held in the Senate of the Philippines in August 2016.

In 2015, the twenty member countries in a forum chaired by the Philippines launched the official bloc of the forum, the 'V20' or 'Vulnerable Twenty', consisting of 20 nations that are highly affected by catastrophes amplified by climate change. The members of the bloc are Afghanistan, Bangladesh, Barbados, Bhutan, Costa Rica, Ethiopia, Ghana, Kenya, Kiribati, Madagascar, Maldives, Nepal, Philippines, Rwanda, Saint Lucia, Tanzania, Timor-Leste, Tuvalu, Vanuatu, and Vietnam. During the 2nd V20 Ministerial Dialogue in April 2016 in Washington DC, the V20 recognized the 23 new members that joined the CVF in 2015 as incoming members in the V20 initiative. These countries are currently and diversely affected by various climate change problems such as super storms, storm surges, droughts, famine due to climate factors, food shortage as by-product of climate change, power cutting, flash floods, mud slides, desertification, heatwaves, reduction of fresh water sources, and other effects of climate change.

== Formation ==
The CVF was founded by the Maldives government before the 2009 United Nations Climate Change Conference in Copenhagen, which sought to increase awareness of countries considered vulnerable. Eleven governments from Africa, Asia, the Americas and the Pacific, representing the countries most vulnerable to climate change, met near the Maldives capital of Malé in November 2009. The governments issued a declaration expressing alarm at the pace of change and damage as a result of global warming, stating that these conditions are "an existential threat to our nations, our cultures and to our way of life" and "undermine the internationally-protected human rights of our people".

A group of countries which emit small amounts of greenhouse gases enacted the CVF declaration, pledging to lead the world to a low-carbon (and, ultimately, carbon-neutral) economy. The CVF recognized the need for international support to achieve these objectives in vulnerable countries. A number of these countries' leaders, including Maldives President Mohamed Nasheed, are key figures in the CVF. The vulnerable countries received significant media attention at the Copenhagen summit, where they were involved in closed-door negotiations with leaders of the United States and China. The CVF Declaration committed to achieve a concentration of no more than 350 ppm (parts per million) of carbon dioxide in the Earth's atmosphere and limit warming to 1.5 degrees Celsius (or less) above preindustrial levels. This position was later adopted by the Alliance of Small Island States. Antigua, Barbuda, Costa Rica, Ethiopia, the Marshall Islands and Samoa also followed Maldives as developing countries committed to low-carbon development or carbon neutrality.

== Development ==
=== Maldives ===
The founding countries pledged to demonstrate moral leadership and work towards a green economy by committing to carbon neutrality. They called upon all countries to follow the moral leadership of Maldives, the first country to pledge to achieve carbon neutrality. Maldives held an underwater cabinet meeting on the dangers of the current sea level rise, and was the CVF's first chair from 2009 to 2010.

=== Kiribati ===
Kiribati was the second chair of the CVF, from 2010 to 2011. It hosted the Tarawa Climate Change Conference on November 9–11, 2010, where the Ambo Declaration was signed by 12 countries: Kiribati, the Solomon Islands, Tonga, the Republic of the Maldives, Cuba, Brazil, Fiji, Japan, China, the Marshall Islands, New Zealand and Australia. In May 2013 a follow-up statement about the 2010 conference and the agreements reached there was made, indicating disappointment and asking if focusing on two new provisions (greenhouse gas emissions and climate change) would better serve their goals.

=== Bangladesh ===
Bangladesh was the third chair of the CVF, from 2011 to 2013. Its government hosted a ministerial meeting of the forum on November 13–14, 2011 in Dhaka, where Prime Minister Sheikh Hasina and UN Secretary General Ban Ki-moon were keynote speakers at its inauguration ceremony. Nineteen climate-vulnerable countries supported the Declaration, and it was adopted in Dhaka on November 14, 2011.

=== Costa Rica ===
Costa Rica took over as CVF chair from Bangladesh in mid-2013. The CVF adopted an Action Plan under the Costa Rica presidency for the 2013-15 period. This Action Plan was released at the UN Climate Change Conference at Warsaw, Poland (COP19) in November 2013, and includes cooperative action of vulnerable countries across six different multilateral sectors, including finance, health, human rights, labour and migration, mandating new research, high-level consultations and diplomatic activities.

=== Philippines ===
The CVF was chaired by Senator Loren Legarda of the Philippines. The Philippines took over responsibility as CVF chair from Costa Rica in January 2015 and will continue to preside the Forum until mid-2016. In 2015, the chair announced the official launching of the 'Vulnerable Twenty' or 'V20' as a more comprehensive offshoot bloc from the established forum. The Philippines highlighted the importance of finance in climate change. The 'V20' was officially launched by all member countries in the city of Lima in Peru(a non-member country which also handled come meetings in the 2015 APEC). The chairmanship of the Philippines coincided with its chairmanship of APEC, which created a much prepared mechanism for the flow and handling of the forum.

Under the presidency of the Philippines, the CVF adopted the Manila-Paris Declaration and the 2016-2018 Roadmap at the Third High-Level Meeting of the CVF held during COP21. The Manila-Paris Declaration articulated the common concerns and commitments of vulnerable countries and urged the strengthening of the UNFCCC goal of limiting warming to below 1.5 degrees Celsius above pre-industrial levels. The country of Palau became a member of the forum after being endorsed by the Philippines.

=== Ethiopia ===
Ethiopia was confirmed as the incoming chair of the CVF at the Third High-Level Meeting of the CVF held during the 2015 United Nations Climate Change Conference in Paris (COP21).

== Membership ==
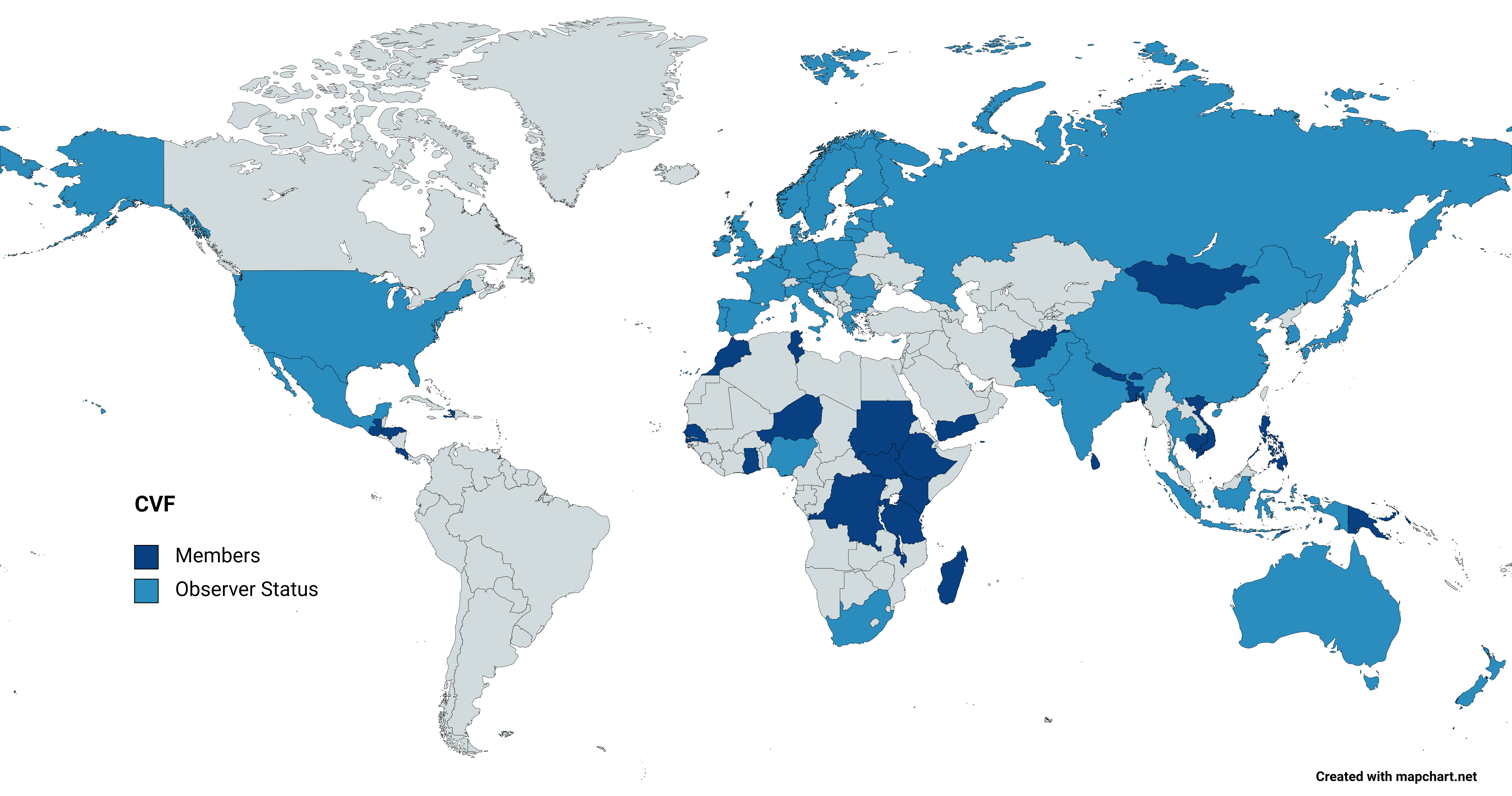

Forty-three governments have participated in the CVF from key developing regions around the world. In 2009, the following countries adopted its first declaration: Bangladesh, Barbados, Bhutan, Ghana, Kenya, Kiribati, Maldives, Nepal, Rwanda, Tanzania, and Vietnam Two years later, the following countries adopted its second declaration: Afghanistan, Bangladesh, Bhutan, Costa Rica, Ethiopia, Ghana, Kenya, Kiribati, Madagascar, Maldives, Nepal, Philippines, Rwanda, Saint Lucia, Tanzania, Timor-Leste, Tuvalu, Vanuatu, and Vietnam.

At the Third High Level Meeting of the CVF held during COP21 the membership of the Forum increased to include the following twenty-three new members: Burkina Faso, Cambodia, Comoros, Democratic Republic of the Congo, Dominican Republic, Fiji, Grenada, Guatemala, Haiti, Honduras, Malawi, Marshall Islands, Mongolia, Morocco, Niger, Palau, Papua New Guinea, Senegal, South Sudan, Sri Lanka, Sudan, Tunisia and Yemen.

== Institutional support ==
In September 2012, the CVF established a trust fund administered by the United Nations Development Programme (UNDP). United Nations agencies collaborate in implementing activities linked to the CVF with the UNDP, the lead organization supporting the forum's work. DARA, an independent, nonprofit organization based in Madrid, had previously provided institutional support to the CVF. The Global Center on Adaptation was the managing partner of the CVF. In 2023, CVF set up an independent institution in Accra, Ghana.

== Climate Vulnerability Monitor ==
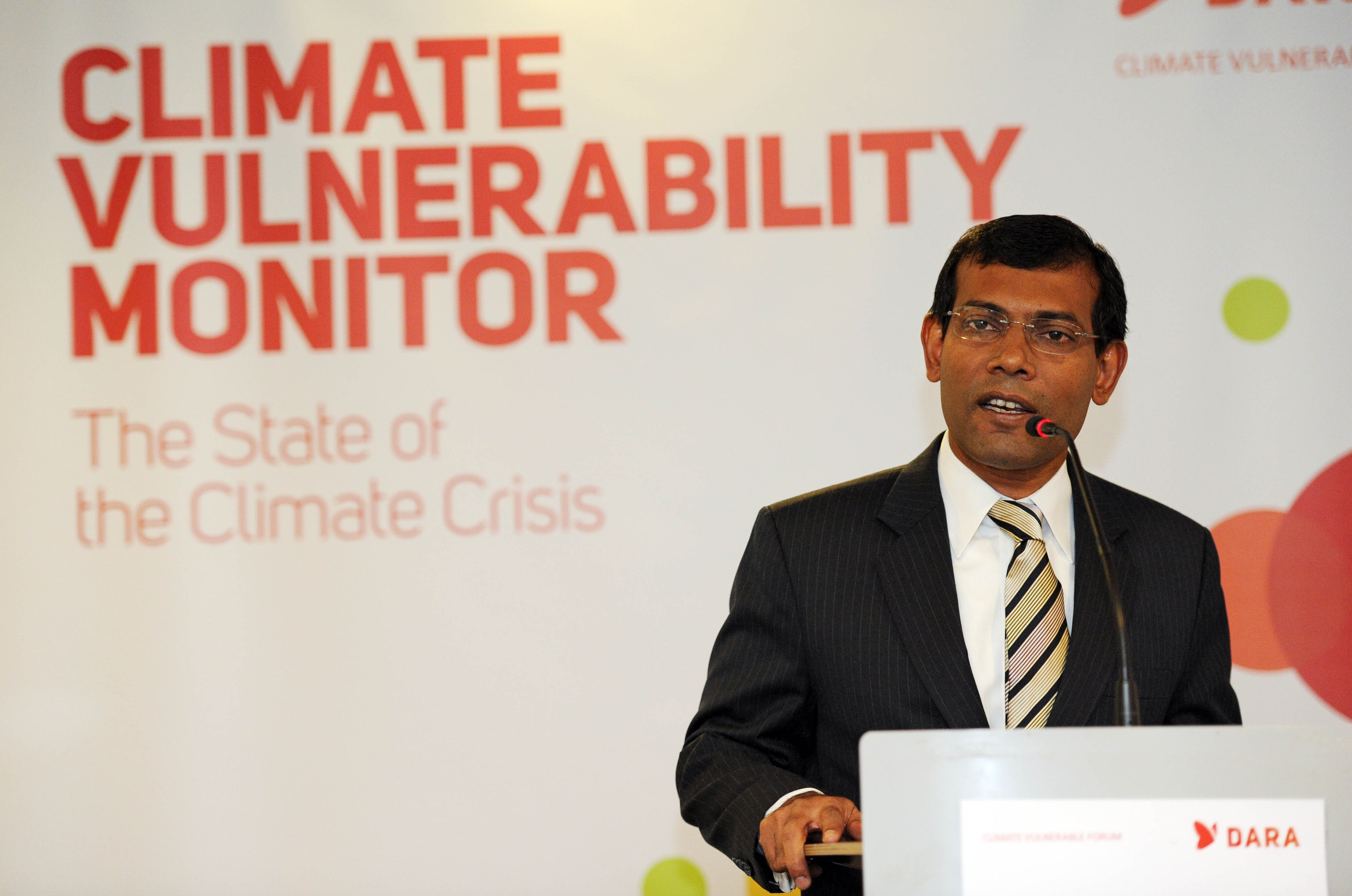
Mohamed Nasheed, President of the Maldives, at the introduction of the Climate Vulnerability Monitor

The CVF and DARA published the Climate Vulnerability Monitor, "The State of the Climate Crisis," in December 2010. The global study covered 184 countries affected by the short-term impacts of climate change in four key areas: health, weather disasters, habitat loss and economic stress.

A second edition of the Climate Vulnerability Monitor, "A Guide to the Cold Calculus of a Hot Planet", was published in September 2012. It expanded on the first report's analysis, describing 34 indicators of positive and negative effects predicted to result from climate change.

== Discussion ==
The purpose of the CVF is to channel input from the most vulnerable groups, creating new policies and promoting effective action on climate change as it evolves. The forum is recognized as a voice on international climate-change issues.

The forum's latest Climate Vulnerability Monitor specifies the costs and benefits of addressing climate change instead of continuing current trends in the globally fossil fuel-intensive economic pathway. Its analysis relies on Intergovernmental Panel on Climate Change (IPCC) greenhouse gas emission projections and studies showing carbon-intensive energy means indicating 10-100 times the level of negative externalities when compared to climate-safe alternatives.

Scholarly discussion of climate vulnerability and the meaning of vulnerability itself is more subjective, leading to a separate (but closely linked) debate. There are clear discrepancies in how different countries deal with climate change, leading to dissent about how the issue should be handled at the international level. A question is, "Are countries with better economic standing responsible for helping less privileged countries deal with climate change?" According to a spokesperson for the Climate and Development Knowledge Network, climate vulnerability is an issue of "equity and human rights" determined by climate change's effect on a given nation's environment and the level of that nation's preparedness and available resources to deal with its challenges.

== See also ==
- The Vulnerable Twenty Group (V20)
