= The Vulnerable Twenty Group =

International climate change initiative

The Vulnerable Twenty Group (V20) is a cooperation initiative of countries systemically vulnerable to climate change. It encompasses 74 nations, representing approximately 20% of the world's population, and generating about 5% of global emissions, that are particularly affected by climate change. The initiative was founded in October 2015 in Lima, Peru, with the founding Chair the Philippines at the climate vulnerable forum by the 20 founding members: Afghanistan, Bangladesh, Barbados, Bhutan, Costa Rica, Ethiopia, Ghana, Kenya, Kiribati, Madagascar, Maldives, Nepal, Philippines, Rwanda, Saint Lucia, Tanzania, East Timor, Tuvalu, Vanuatu and Vietnam.

Its primary objectives are to promote the mobilization of public and private climate finance, share best practices, develop new financing approaches and do advocacy work.

== Financing obstacles of V20 Countries ==
The capacity to adequately prevent and react to the impacts of a changing climate is impeded by domestic resource constraints, on the one hand, and the limited amounts of suitable climate finance on the other hand. High and rising levels of public debt, also driven by recurring climate disasters and disproportionately high sovereign borrowing costs, crowd out urgent resilience, crises and recovery spending, which again worsens adaptation and sustainable development prospects further. Occasionally, disruptions in new debt lending occur, especially when the impending refinancing of debt arises. These interruptions result from several, sometimes even seemingly arbitrary, factors, including assessments of their borrowing thresholds by the International Monetary Fund (IMF) using its debt sustainability framework (DSF). Debt suspensions often culminate in defaults, complicating the financial situation of V20 countries and hindering their ability to allocate funds for important climate change adaptation and mitigation measures.

Critics have highlighted issues with the IMF's DSF methodology. It tends to conflate short-term liquidity metrics with medium-to-long term solvency indicators. Several V20 nations display a noticeable incongruity wherein liquid assets are relatively scarce, for instance, because of climate adversities that undermine their financial liquidity, compared to their solvency. Due to these unavoidable external factors, it is of utmost importance for future lenders to focus on future solvency. Furthermore, the IMF's evaluations often overlook negative interest rate-growth differentials (IRGDs) typical in these countries, which imply a broader fiscal space than acknowledged.

For these nations, expanding their fiscal space can be pivotal. It facilitates their navigation away from economic challenges and enables substantial investments in climate change strategies. New research indicates that the majority of Low-Income Countries (LICs), barring a few, could have an additional fiscal space amounting to 75%-100% of their GDP beyond the IMF's DSF with high probability. By contrast, Market-Access Countries (MACs) seem to have a lesser but still considerable potential for additional fiscal space. It is imperative, therefore, for financial institutions to take long-term perspectives when evaluating these climate-vulnerable nations with regards to their credit rating, in order to mitigate future debt defaults.

The V20 has repeatedly called for debt relief and restructuring, alongside an implementation plan for doubling international finance for adaptation and other related actions.

== See also ==
- Climate Vulnerable Forum
