= Developing country =

Nation with a relatively low living standard

Comparison of countries by their level of development (seven criteria: HDI, WESP, WB, DAC, IMF, Paris Club, UNIDO) 5+ criteria 4 criteria 3 criteria 2 criteria 1 criterion

A developing country is a country with a less-developed industrial base and a lower Human Development Index (HDI) relative to developed countries. However, this definition is not universally agreed upon. There is also no clear agreement on which countries fit this category. The terms low-and middle-income country (LMIC) and newly emerging economy (NEE) are often used interchangeably but they refer only to the economy of the countries. The World Bank classifies the world's economies into four groups, based on gross national income per capita: high-, upper-middle-, lower-middle-, and low-income countries. Least developed countries, landlocked developing countries, and small island developing states are all sub-groupings of developing countries. Countries on the other end of the spectrum are usually referred to as high-income countries or developed countries.

There are controversies over the term's use, as some feel that it perpetuates an outdated concept of "us" and "them". In 2015, the World Bank declared that the "developing/developed world categorization" had become less relevant and that they would phase out the use of that descriptor. Instead, their reports will present data aggregations for regions and income groups. The term "Global South" is used by some as an alternative term to developing countries.

Developing countries tend to have some characteristics in common, often due to their histories or geographies. These are the characteristics captured by the data and definitions of the World Bank and the United Nations. On the other hand, the IMF classification focuses solely on financial integration and stability and not on the overall level of social and economic development of a country. It is also reflected by the IMF terminology that uses markets/economies and not countries. Moreover, the adoption of the Euro has earned several European countries an immediate upgrade by IMF to being a developed economy (a standard practice by the IMF) based on the larger financial integration without considering any other factors of economic or social development.

Among other characteristics, developing or low and medium income countries (as defined by the World Bank) commonly have lower levels of access to safe drinking water, sanitation and hygiene, energy poverty, higher levels of pollution (e.g., air pollution, littering, water pollution, open defecation); higher proportions of people with tropical and infectious diseases (neglected tropical diseases); more road traffic accidents; and generally poorer quality infrastructure.

In addition, there are often high unemployment rates, widespread poverty, widespread hunger, extreme poverty, child labour, malnutrition, homelessness, substance abuse, prostitution, overpopulation, civil disorder, human capital flight, a large informal economy, high crime rates (extortion, robbery, burglary, murder, homicide, arms trafficking, sex trafficking, drug trafficking, kidnapping, rape), high incarceration rates, low education levels, economic inequality, school desertion, inadequate access to family planning services, teenage pregnancy, many informal settlements and slums, corruption at all government levels, and political instability. Unlike developed countries, developing countries lack the rule of law.

Access to healthcare is often low. People in developing countries usually have lower life expectancies than people in developed countries, reflecting both lower income levels and poorer public health. The burden of infectious diseases, maternal mortality, child mortality and infant mortality are typically substantially higher in those countries. The effects of climate change are expected to affect developing countries more than high-income countries, as most of them have a high climate vulnerability or low climate resilience. Phrases such as "resource poor setting" or "low-resource setting" are often used when referring to healthcare in developing countries.

Developing countries often have lower median ages than developed countries. Population aging is a global phenomenon, but population age has risen more slowly in developing countries.

Development aid or development cooperation is financial aid given by foreign governments and other agencies to support developing countries' economic, environmental, social, and political development. If the Sustainable Development Goals which were set up by United Nations for the year 2030 are achieved, they would overcome many problems.

== Terms used to classify countries ==
There are several terms used to classify countries into rough levels of development. Classification of any given country differs across sources, and sometimes, these classifications or the specific terminology used is considered disparaging.

=== By income groups ===
A map of World Bank high-income economies in 2026

The World Bank classifies the world's economies into four groups, based on gross national income per capita calculated using the Atlas method, re-set each year on 1 July:

- high income countries (similar to developed countries)
- upper-middle income countries
- lower-middle income countries
- low-income countries

The three groups that are not "high income" are together referred to as "low and middle income countries" (LMICs). For example, for the 2027 fiscal year, a low income country is defined as one with a GNI per capita less than 1,135 in current US$; a lower middle-income country is one with GNI per capita between 1,135 and 4,495 in current US$; an upper middle-income country is one with GNI per capita between 4,495 and 14,375 in current US$, and a high income country is one with GNI per capita of more than 14,375 in current US$. Historical thresholds are documented.

=== By markets and economic growth ===
The use of the term "market" instead of "country" usually indicates a specific focus on the characteristics of the countries' financial support system as opposed to the overall economy.

- Developed countries and developed markets
- Developing countries include in decreasing order of economic growth or size of the capital market:
  - Newly industrialized countries
  - Emerging markets
  - Frontier markets
  - Least developed countries (also called less economically developed country)

Under other criteria, some countries are at an intermediate stage of development, or, as the International Monetary Fund (IMF) put it, following the fall of the Soviet Union, "countries in transition": all those of Central and Eastern Europe (including Central European countries that still belonged to the "Eastern Europe Group" in the UN institutions); the former Soviet Union (USSR) countries in Central Asia (Kazakhstan, Uzbekistan, Kyrgyzstan, Tajikistan and Turkmenistan); and Mongolia. By 2009, the IMF's World Economic Outlook classified countries as advanced, emerging, or developing, depending on "(1) per capita income level, (2) export diversification—so oil exporters that have high per capita GDP would not make the advanced classification because around 70% of its exports are oil, and (3) degree of integration into the global financial system".

=== By geography ===
Developing countries can also be categorized by geography:

- Small Island Developing States (a group of developing countries that are small island countries which tend to share similar sustainable development challenges: small but growing populations, limited resources, remoteness, susceptibility to natural disasters, vulnerability to external shocks, excessive dependence on international trade, and fragile environments).
- Landlocked Developing Countries (landlocked countries often experience economic and other disadvantages)

=== By other parameters ===
- Heavily indebted poor countries, a definition by a program of the IMF and World Bank
- Transition economy, moving from a centrally planned to market-driven economy
- Multi-dimensional clustering system: with the understanding that different countries have different development priorities and levels of access to resources and institutional capacities and to offer a more nuanced understanding of developing countries and their characteristics, scholars have categorized them into five distinct groups based on factors such as levels of poverty and inequality, productivity and innovation, political constraints and dependence on external flows.

=== By self declaration ===
In general, the WTO accepts any country's claim of itself being "developing." Certain countries that have become "developed" in the last 20 years by almost all economic metrics still insist to be classified as a "developing country," as it entitles them to a preferential treatment at the WTO; countries such as Brunei, Hong Kong, Kuwait, Macao, Qatar, Singapore, and the United Arab Emirates have been cited and criticized for this self-declared status.

== Measure and concept of development ==
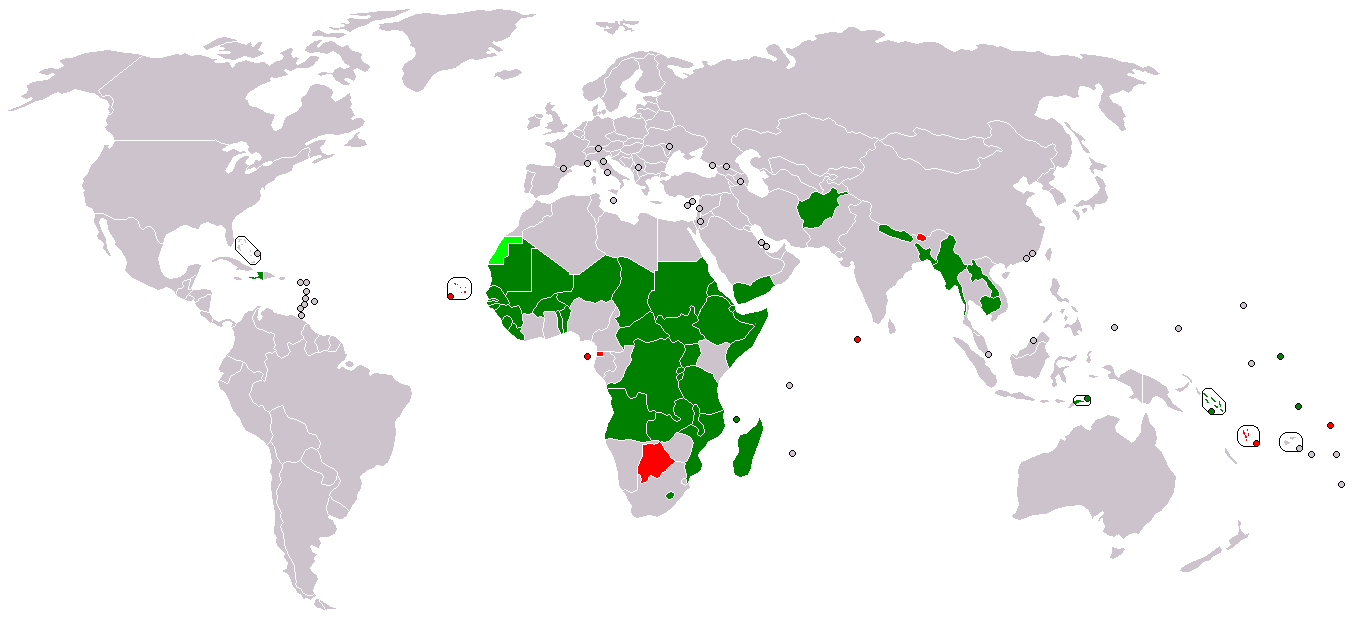
Least developed economies according to the ECOSOC Least developed economies out of scope of the ECOSOC Countries graduated from the least developed country category: Botswana (1994), Cabo Verde (2007), Maldives (2011), Samoa (2014), Equatorial Guinea (2017), Vanuatu (2020), Bhutan (2023), and São Tomé and Príncipe (2024)

GDP (PPP) per capita in 2026: >$70,000; $60,000–70,000; $50,000 – $60,000; $40,000 – $50,000; $30,000 – $40,000; $20,000 – $30,000; $10,000 – $20,000; $5,000 – $10,000; $2,500 – $5,000; $1,000 – $2,500; <$1,000; No data

The latest classifications sorted by the IMF and the UN

Development can be measured by economic or human factors. Developing countries are, in general, countries that have not achieved a significant degree of industrialization relative to their populations, and have, in most cases, a medium to low standard of living. There is an association between low income and high population growth. The development of a country is measured with statistical indices such as income per capita (per person), gross domestic product per capita, life expectancy, the rate of literacy, freedom index and others. The UN has developed the Human Development Index (HDI), a compound indicator of some of the above statistics, to gauge the level of human development for countries where data is available. The UN had set Millennium Development Goals from a blueprint developed by all of the world's countries and leading development institutions, in order to evaluate growth. These goals ended in 2015, to be superseded by the Sustainable Development Goals.

The concept of the developing nation is found, under one term or another, in numerous theoretical systems having diverse orientations – for example, theories of decolonization, liberation theology, Marxism, anti-imperialism, modernization, social change and political economy.

Another important indicator is the sectoral changes that have occurred since the stage of development of the country. On an average, countries with a 50% contribution from the secondary sector (manufacturing) have grown substantially. Similarly, countries with a tertiary sector stronghold also see a greater rate of economic development.

== Associated theories ==
The term "developing countries" has many research theories associated with it (in chronological order):

- Modernization theory – to explain the process of modernization within societies
- Dependency theory – the notion that resources flow from a "periphery" of poor and underdeveloped states to a "core" of wealthy states, enriching the latter at the expense of the former
- Development theory – a collection of theories about how desirable change in society is best achieved.
- Postdevelopment theory – holds that the whole concept and practice of development is a reflection of Western-Northern hegemony over the rest of the world

== Criticisms of the term ==
There is criticism for using the term "developing country". The term could imply inferiority of this kind of country compared with a developed country. It could assume a desire to develop along the traditional Western model of economic development which a few countries, such as Cuba and Bhutan, choose not to follow. Alternative measurements such as gross national happiness have been suggested as important indicators.

One of the early criticisms that questioned the use of the terms "developing" and "underdeveloped" countries was voiced in 1973 by prominent historian and academic Walter Rodney who compared the economic, social, and political parameters between the United States and countries in Africa and Asia.

There is "no established convention" for defining "developing country". According to economist Jeffrey Sachs, the current divide between the developed and developing world is largely a phenomenon of the 20th century. The late global health expert Hans Rosling has argued against the terms, calling the concept "outdated" since the terms are used under the prerequisite that the world is divided in rich and poor countries, while the fact is that the vast majority of countries are middle-income. Given the lack of a clear definition, sustainability expert Mathis Wackernagel and founder of Global Footprint Network, emphasizes that the binary labeling of countries is "neither descriptive nor explanatory". Wackernagel identifies these binary terms of "developing" vs. "developed" countries, or "North" vs. "South", as "a thoughtless and destructive endorsement of GDP fetish." Wackernagel and Rosling both argue that in reality, there are not two types of countries, but over 200 countries, all faced with the same laws of nature, yet each with unique features.

The term "developing" refers to a current situation and not a changing dynamic or expected direction of development. Since the late 1990s, countries identified by the UN as developing countries tended to demonstrate higher growth rates than those in the developed countries category.

To moderate the euphemistic aspect of the word "developing", international organizations have started to use the term less economically developed country for the poorest nations – which can, in no sense, be regarded as developing. This highlights that the standard of living across the entire developing world varies greatly.

In 2015, the World Bank declared that the "developing / developed world categorization" had become less relevant, due to worldwide improvements in indices such as child mortality rates, fertility rates and extreme poverty rates. In the 2016 edition of its World Development Indicators (WDI), the World Bank made a decision to no longer distinguish between "developed" and "developing" countries in the presentation of its data, considering the two-category distinction outdated. Accordingly, World Bank is phasing out use of that descriptor. Instead, the reports by Worldbank (such as the WDI and the Global Monitoring Report) now include data aggregations for the whole world, for regions, and for income groups – but not for the "developing world".

== Related terms ==
The term low and middle-income country (LMIC) is often used interchangeably with "developing country" but refers only to the economy of the countries. Least developed countries, landlocked developing countries and small island developing states are all sub-groupings of developing countries. Countries on the other end of the spectrum are usually referred to as high-income countries or developed countries.

In the context of healthcare, phrases such as "resource poor setting" or "low-resource setting" are often used to describe healthcare within developing countries, although these terms may also apply within parts of richer countries. Characteristics of resource-poor settings are poor healthcare infrastructure, financial limitations, a scarcity of trained professionals, poor healthcare technology, and a discontinuous supply chain. Other constraints may include geographical and environmental challenges, and cultural influences that affect health literacy.

=== Global South ===
The term "Global South" began to be used more widely since about 2004. It can also include poorer "southern" regions of wealthy "northern" countries. The Global South refers to these countries' "interconnected histories of colonialism, neo-imperialism, and differential economic and social change through which large inequalities in living standards, life expectancy, and access to resources are maintained".

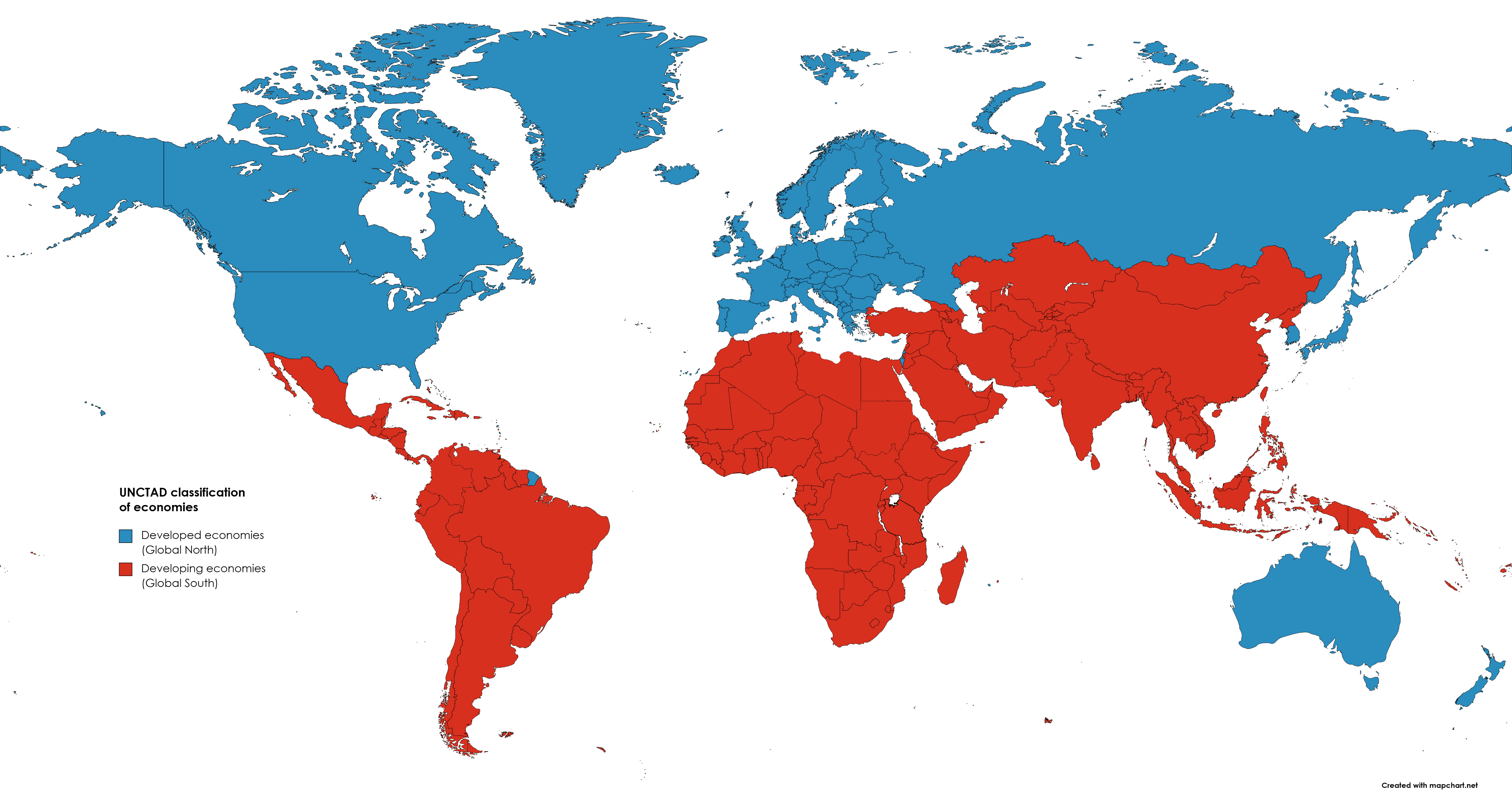
Economic classification of the world's countries and territories by the UNCTAD in 2023: "North" refers to the developed economies, highlighted in blue; and "South" to the developing and least developed economies, highlighted in red. UNCTAD notes that "the designations "developing" and "developed" are intended for statistical convenience and do not necessarily express a judgement about the stage reached by a particular economy in the development process".

Global North and Global South are terms denoting a method of grouping countries based on their defining characteristics with regard to socioeconomics. The terms refer to developed and developing/least developed countries respectively. According to UN Trade and Development (UNCTAD), the Global South broadly comprises Africa, Latin America and the Caribbean, Asia (excluding Israel, Japan, South Korea), and Oceania (excluding Australia and New Zealand). Most of the Global South's countries are commonly identified as lacking in their standard of living, which includes having lower incomes, high levels of poverty, high population growth rates, inadequate housing, limited educational opportunities, and deficient health systems, among other issues. Additionally, these countries' cities are characterized by their poor infrastructure. Opposite to the Global South is the Global North, which the UNCTAD describes as broadly comprising Northern America and Europe, Israel, Japan, South Korea, Australia, and New Zealand. Consequently the two groups do not correspond to the Northern Hemisphere or the Southern Hemisphere, as many of the Global South's countries are geographically located in the north and vice-versa.

The Global North and the Global South are often defined in terms of their differing levels of wealth, economic development, income inequality, and strength of democracy, as well as by their political freedom and economic freedom, as defined by a variety of freedom indices. Countries of the Global North tend to be wealthier, and export technologically advanced manufactured products, among other characteristics. In contrast, countries of the Global South tend to be relatively poorer, and heavily dependent on their largely agrarian-based economic primary sectors. Some scholars suggest that the inequality gap between the Global North and the Global South has narrowed since globalization. Others contend that the Global South has instead become poorer vis-à-vis the Global North.

=== Third World ===
The term Third World arose during the Cold War to define countries that remained non-aligned with either NATO or the Warsaw Pact. The United States, Canada, Japan, South Korea, Turkey, the Southern Cone, Western European countries and other allies represented the "First World", while the Soviet Union, China, Cuba, North Korea, Vietnam, Romania and the rest of the Warsaw Pact and their allies represented the "Second World". This terminology provided a way of broadly categorizing the nations of the Earth into three groups based on political divisions. Due to the complex history of evolving meanings and contexts, there is no clear or agreed-upon definition of the Third World. Strictly speaking, "Third World" was a political, rather than economic, grouping.

== Common characteristics ==
=== Government, politics and administration ===
Many developing countries have only attained full self-determination and democracy after the second half of the 20th century. Many were governed by an imperial European power until decolonization. Political systems in developing countries are diverse, but most states had established some form of democratic governments by the early 21st century, with varying degrees of success and political liberty. The inhabitants of developing countries were introduced to democratic systems later and more abruptly than their Northern counterparts and were sometimes targeted by governmental and non-governmental efforts to encourage participation. 'Effective citizenship' is defined by sociologist Patrick Heller as: "closing [the] gap between formal legal rights in the civil and political arena, and the actual capability to meaningfully practice those rights".

Beyond citizenship, the study of the politics of cross-border mobility in developing countries has also shed valuable light in migration debates, seen as a corrective to the traditional focus on developed countries. Some political scientists identify a 'typology of nationalizing, developmental, and neoliberal migration management regimes' across developing countries.

=== Economy ===
Following independence and decolonization, many developing countries have found themselves in periods of significant instability with a dire need for infrastructure, industry, and economic stimulation. This has broadly led to heavy reliance on foreign investment to stabilize the economy. However, the nature of this foreign investment is often highly predatory, leading to systemic exploitation and inequality. In particular, the exportation of raw materials has often benefited developed countries over developing, and policies such as protectionism have had a hand in limiting the agency of resource-rich developing nations. Additionally, many brands and companies based in the Western world, seeking cheaper labor, have taken advantage of the low wages and desperate job markets often found in developing countries, establishing sweatshops and creating highly exploitative employment models. The Global North has benefited significantly from this systemic exploitation whilst leaving developing countries undeveloped, something which continues uninterrupted to the present day.

This arrangement is often referred to as neocolonialism, a system in which less-developed countries are taken advantage of by developed countries. It does not necessarily mean that former colonies are still controlled by their former colonizer; it refers to colonial-like exploitation. Developing countries are often providing resources and labor toward the further development of rich countries, rather than dedicating these resources to their own development. Notable efforts towards ending this systemic injustice on a global scale include the adoption of the "Declaration on the Establishment of a New International Economic Order" and accompanying program of action by the United Nations General Assembly in 1974, with the goal of advocating on behalf of developing nations for sovereignty over natural resources and industrialization.

More broadly, coalitions such as the United Nations frequently lobby for parity in global economics, dedicating resources towards issues such as extreme poverty, food insecurity, healthcare, education, and human rights. These issues disproportionately affect the Global South, especially those in Latin America, the Caribbean, and Africa, with current estimates indicating that nearly two-thirds of those in extreme poverty live in Sub-Saharan African countries. Some sources speculate that China's growing dominance in the global market may indicate a shift in power for BRICS member nations.

== Common challenges ==
The global issues most often discussed by developing countries include globalisation, global health governance, health, and prevention needs. This is contrasted by issues developed nations tend to address, such as innovations in science and technology.

Most developing countries have these criteria in common:

- High levels of poverty – measured based on GNI per capita averaged over three years. For example, if the GNI per capita is less than US$1,088 (as of 2024) the country is regarded as a least developed country.
- Human resource weakness (based on indicators of nutrition, health, education and adult literacy).
- Economic vulnerability (based on instability of agricultural production, instability of exports of goods and services, economic importance of non-traditional activities, merchandise export concentration, handicap of economic smallness, and the percentage of population displaced by natural disasters). Among other challenges, developing countries have a higher risk of suffering a balance of payments crisis.

=== Urban slums ===
According to UN-Habitat, around 33% of the urban population in the developing world in 2012, or about 863 million people, lived in slums. In 2012, the proportion of urban population living in slums was highest in Sub-Saharan Africa (62%), followed by South Asia (35%), Southeast Asia (31%) and East Asia (28%).

The UN-Habitat reports that 43% of urban population in developing countries and 78% of those in the least developed countries live in slums.

Slums form and grow in different parts of the world for many reasons. Causes include rapid rural-to-urban migration, economic stagnation and depression, high unemployment, poverty, informal economy, forced or manipulated ghettoization, poor planning, politics, natural disasters and social conflicts. For example, as populations expand in poorer countries, rural people move to cities in extensive urban migration that results in the creation of slums.

In some cities, especially in countries in Southern Asia and Sub-Saharan Africa, slums are not just marginalized neighborhoods holding a small population; slums are widespread, and are home to a large part of urban population. These are sometimes called "slum cities".

=== Violence against women ===
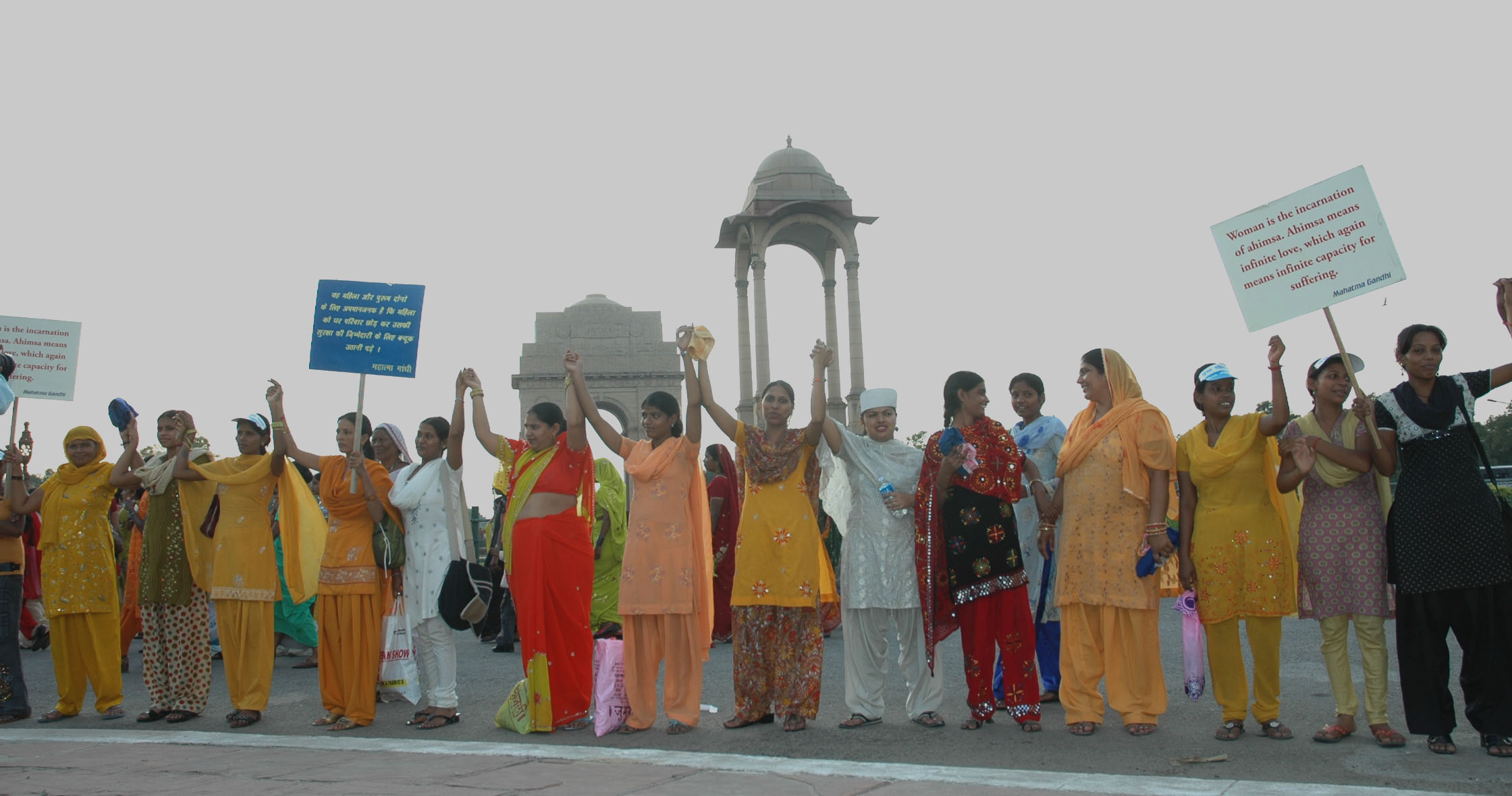
A formation of human chain at India Gate by the women from different walks of life at the launch of a National Campaign on prevention of violence against women, in New Delhi on 2 October 2009

Several forms of violence against women are more prevalent in developing countries than in other parts of the world. Acid throwing is associated with Southeast Asia, including Cambodia. Honor killing is associated with the Middle East and South Asia. Marriage by abduction is found in Ethiopia, Central Asia and the Caucasus. Abuse related to payment of bride price (such as violence, trafficking and forced marriage) is linked to parts of Sub-Saharan Africa and Oceania.

Female genital mutilation (FGM) is another form of violence against women which is still occurring in many developing countries. It is found mostly in Africa, and to a lesser extent in the Middle East and some other parts of Asia. Developing countries with the highest rate of women who have been cut are Somalia (with 98% of women affected), Guinea (96%), Djibouti (93%), Egypt (91%), Eritrea (89%), Mali (89%), Sierra Leone (88%), Sudan (88%), Gambia (76%), Burkina Faso (76%), and Ethiopia (74%). Due to globalization and immigration, FGM is spreading beyond the borders of Africa, Asia and the Middle East, and to countries such as Australia, Belgium, Canada, France, New Zealand, the U.S., and UK.

The Istanbul Convention prohibits female genital mutilation (Article 38). As of 2016, FGM has been legally banned in many African countries.

Percentage of women older than 14 who have experienced violence by an intimate partner

According to UN Women facts and figures on ending violence against women, it is estimated that 35 percent of women worldwide have experienced either physical and sexual violence by intimate partners or sexual violence by a non-partner (not including sexual harassment) at some point in their lives. Evidence shows women who have had experienced physical or sexual intimate partner violence report higher rates of depression, having an abortion and acquiring HIV, compared to women who have not had experienced any physical or sexual violence.

Data from the Middle East and North Africa shows that men who witnessed their fathers against their mothers, and men who experienced some form of violence as children, more likely have reported perpetrating intimate partner violence in their adult relationships.

=== Healthcare and public health ===
The status of healthcare that the general public can access is substantially different between developing countries and developed countries. People in developing countries usually have a lower life expectancy than people in developed countries, reflecting both lower income levels and poorer public health. The burden of infectious diseases, maternal mortality, child mortality and infant mortality are typically substantially higher in those countries. Developing countries also have less access to medical health services generally, and are less likely to have the resources to purchase, produce and administer vaccines, even though vaccine equity worldwide is important to combatting pandemics, such as the COVID-19 pandemic.

Percentage of people with undernutrition by country, World Food Program, 2020 Under 2.5% 2.5% – 5.0% 5.0% – 14.9% 15.0% – 24.9% 25.0% – 34.9% Over 35.0% No data

Undernutrition is more common in developing countries. Certain groups have higher rates of undernutrition, including women – in particular while pregnant or breastfeeding – children under five years of age, and the elderly. Malnutrition in children and stunted growth of children is the cause for more than 200 million children under five years of age in developing countries not reaching their developmental potential. About 165 million children were estimated to have stunted growth from malnutrition in 2013. In some developing countries, overnutrition in the form of obesity is beginning to present within the same communities as undernutrition.

Recent research suggests that artificial intelligence (AI) could help alleviate some of these disparities, especially in low-resource settings where patient literacy is limited. In particular, AI-powered tools may support healthcare workers in communicating health information more effectively to low-literacy patients, for example by using voice-based or visual interfaces rather than text. These systems could reinforce public-health messages, guide patients through care pathways, and reduce misunderstandings — all of which may boost adherence and improve health outcomes. However, successful deployment of such AI interventions requires overcoming important barriers, including limited digital infrastructure, data scarcity, and low health worker training, which are commonly encountered in developing countries.

The following list shows the further significant environmentally-related causes or conditions, as well as certain diseases with a strong environmental component:

- Illness/disease (malaria, tuberculosis, AIDS, etc.): Illness imposes high and regressive cost burdens on families in developing countries.
- Tropical and infectious diseases (neglected tropical diseases)
- Unsafe drinking water, poor sanitation and hygiene
- Indoor air pollution in developing nations
- Pollution (e.g. air pollution, water pollution)
- Motor vehicle collisions
- Unintentional poisoning
- Non communicable diseases and weak healthcare systems

=== Water, sanitation, hygiene (WASH) ===
Access to water, sanitation and hygiene (WASH) services is at very low levels in many developing countries. In 2015 the World Health Organization (WHO) estimated that "1 in 3 people, or 2.4 billion, are still without sanitation facilities" while 663 million people still lack access to safe and clean drinking water. The estimate in 2017 by JMP states that 4.5 billion people currently do not have safely managed sanitation. The majority of these people live in developing countries.

About 892 million people or 12 percent of the global population, practiced open defecation instead of using toilets in 2016. Seventy-six percent (678 million) of the 892 million people practicing open defecation in the world live in just seven countries. Countries with a high number of people openly defecating are India (348 million), followed by Nigeria (38.1 million), Indonesia (26.4 million), Ethiopia (23.1 million), Pakistan (19.7 million), Niger (14.6 million) and Sudan (9.7 million).

Sustainable Development Goal 6 is one of 17 Sustainable Development Goals established by the UN in 2015. It calls for clean water and sanitation for all people. This is particularly relevant for people in developing countries.

=== Energy ===
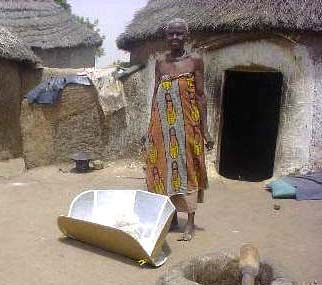
Solar cookers use sunlight as energy source for outdoor cooking.

In 2009, about 1.4 billion of people in the world lived without electricity. 2.7 billion relied on wood, charcoal, and dung (dry animal dung fuel) for home energy requirements. This lack of access to modern energy technology limits income generation, blunts efforts to escape poverty, affects people's health due to indoor air pollution, and contributes to global deforestation and climate change. Small-scale renewable energy technologies and distributed energy options, such as onsite solar power and improved cookstoves, offer rural households modern energy services.

Renewable energy can be particularly suitable for developing countries. In rural and remote areas, transmission and distribution of energy generated from fossil fuels can be difficult and expensive. Producing renewable energy locally can offer a viable alternative.

Renewable energy can directly contribute to poverty alleviation by providing the energy needed for creating businesses and employment. Renewable energy technologies can also make indirect contributions to alleviating poverty by providing energy for cooking, space heating, and lighting.

Kenya is the world leader in the number of solar power systems installed per capita.

=== Pollution ===
==== Water pollution ====
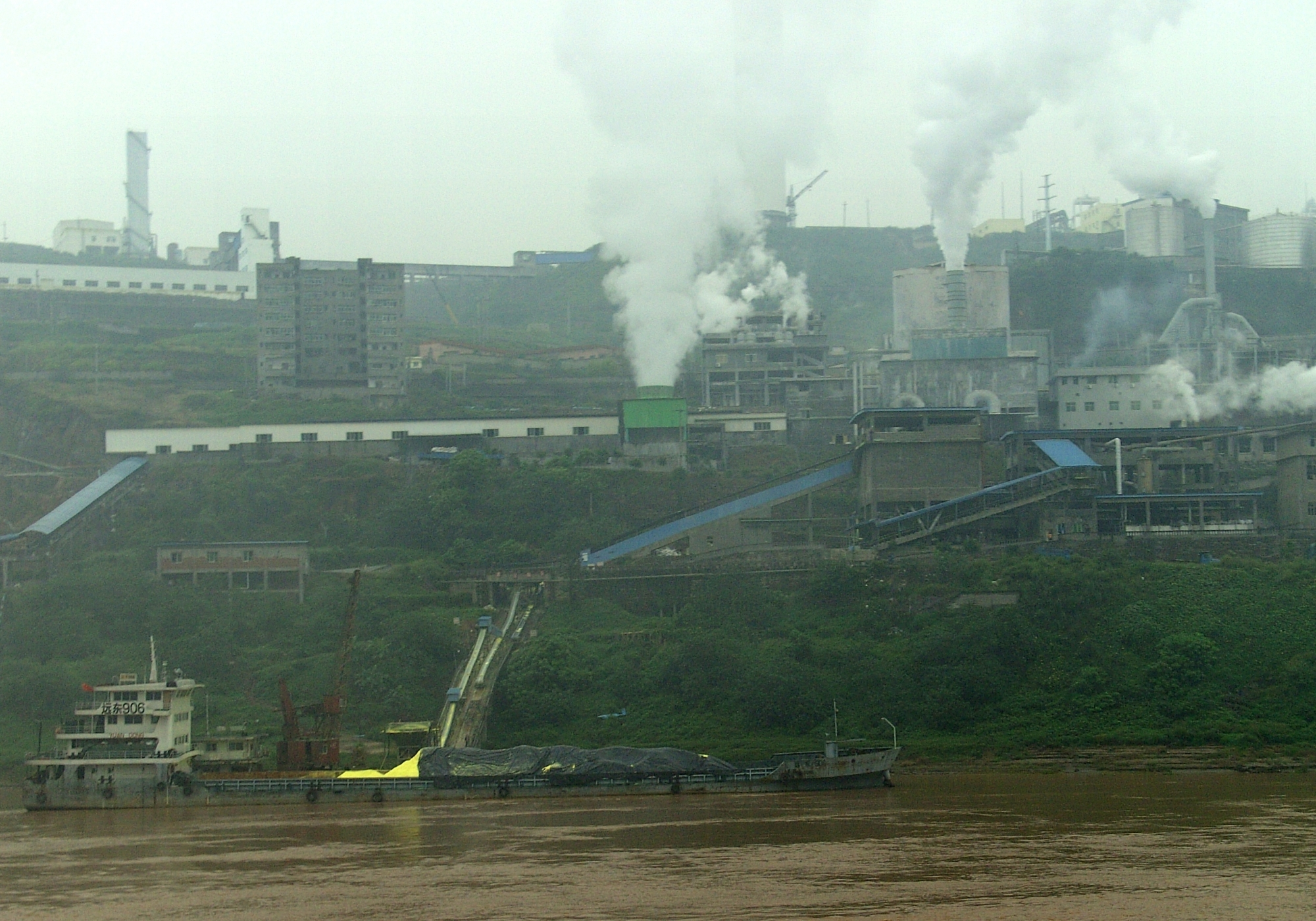
Factory in China at Yangtze River causing air pollution

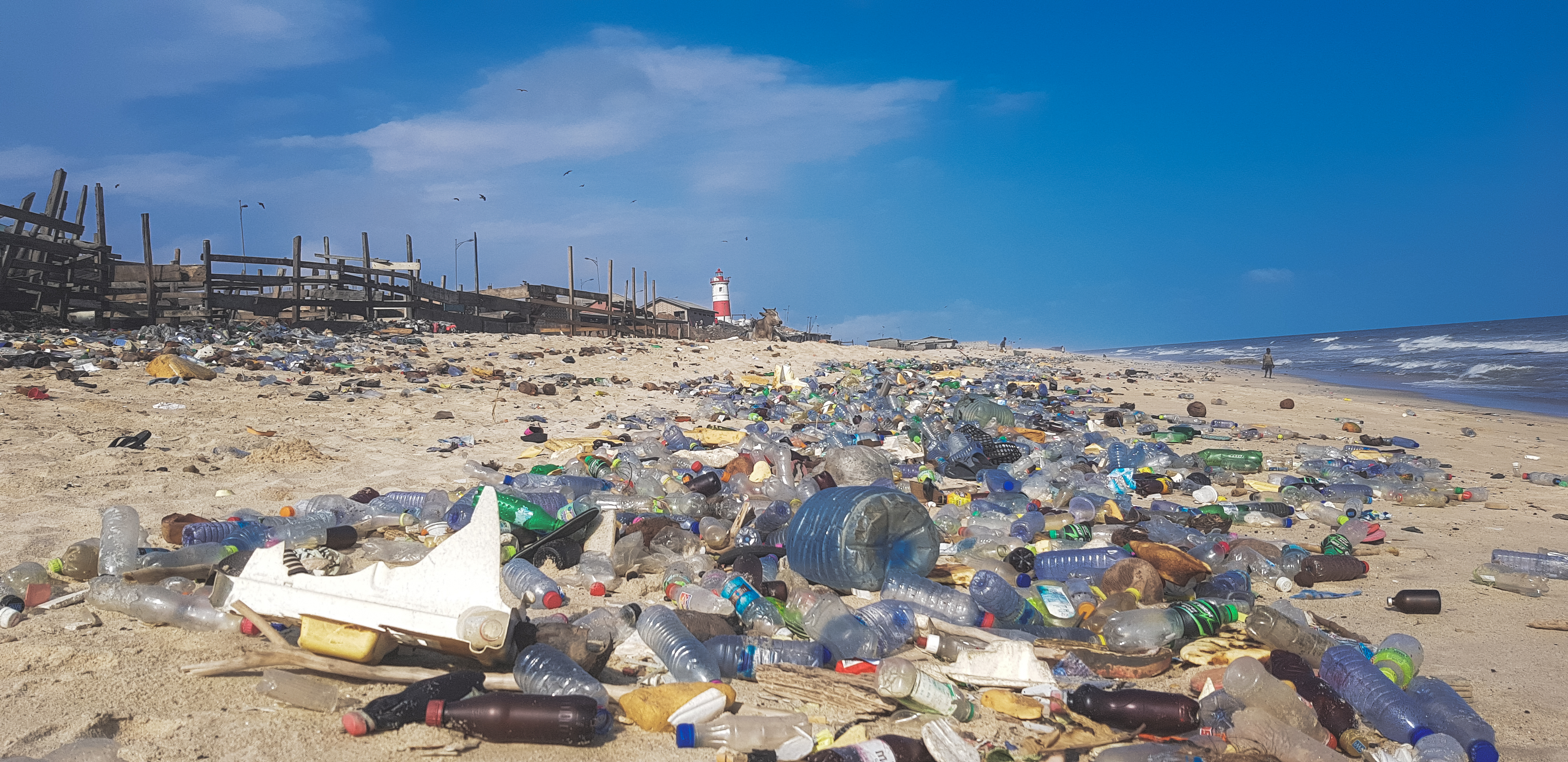
Plastic pollution at a beach near Accra, Ghana

Water pollution is a major problem in many developing countries. It requires ongoing evaluation and revision of water resource policy at all levels (international down to individual aquifers and wells). It has been suggested that water pollution is the leading worldwide cause of death and diseases, and that it accounts for the deaths of more than 14,000 people daily.

India and China are two countries which have experienced high levels of water pollution: As of 2010, an estimated 580 people in India died of water pollution related illness (including waterborne diseases) every day. In 2005, about 90 percent of the water in the cities of China was polluted. As of 2007, half a billion Chinese had no access to safe drinking water.

However, after a series of reforms, China's environment began to demonstrate enormous improvements around the 2010s. Under the leadership of CCP general secretary Xi Jinping, a sizable fraction of high-pollution industries have been gradually phased out and many illegally polluting factories were sanctioned or closed. A considerable amount of effort went to enforce environmental regulations at regional levels and holding persons of malpractice accountable, including officials and firm managers. The slogan "clear waters and green mountains are as valuable as gold and silver mountains" proposed by Chinese leader Xi Jinping in 2005 signifies China's determination in amending environmental burdens created during industrialization while shifting to more sustainable modes of development and adopting high-end industries. Water bodies around the country are much cleaner than a decade ago and steadily approaching natural levels in pollutants.

In 2021, China introduced the "coal to gas" policy as one of many policies directed towards achieving peak carbon emissions in 2060. Coal combustion in homes, power stations and production industries constitutes 60% of total energy consumption in China and is the main source of water and air pollution. It is speculated that pollution sources will be progressively eliminated as China reaches the upper tiers of developing countries.

Further details of water pollution in several countries, including many developing countries:

==== Indoor air pollution ====
Indoor air pollution in developing nations is a major health hazard. A major source of indoor air pollution in developing countries is the burning of biomass. Three billion people in developing countries across the globe rely on biomass in the form of wood, charcoal, dung, and crop residue, as their domestic cooking fuel. Because much of the cooking is carried out indoors in environments that lack proper ventilation, millions of people, primarily poor women and children face serious health risks.

Globally, 4.3 million deaths were attributed to exposure to IAP in developing countries in 2012, almost all in low and middle income countries. The South East Asian and Western Pacific regions bear most of the burden with 1.69 and 1.62 million deaths, respectively. Almost 600,000 deaths occur in Africa. An earlier estimate from 2000 put the death toll between 1.5 million and 2 million deaths.

Finding an affordable solution to address the many effects of indoor air pollution is complex. Strategies include improving combustion, reducing smoke exposure, improving safety and reducing labor, reducing fuel costs, and addressing sustainability.

=== Climate change ===
==== Particular vulnerability to climate change ====
Surface air temperature change over the past 50 years.

The Intergovernmental Panel on Climate Change (IPCC) has confirmed that warming of the climate system due to human intervention is 'unequivocal'. The effects of climate change will be felt around the globe and will result in events such as extreme weather events, droughts, floods, biodiversity loss, disease and sea level rise, which are dangerous for societies and the environment.

Although 79% of carbon emissions are produced by developed countries, and developing countries have not been the major cause of climate change, they are the most at risk from the effects of these changes and may face challenges in adapting to climate change due to the intersecting issues of high climate vulnerability, low economic status, restricted access to technology, failing infrastructure and limited access to financial resources. Where a country is particularly vulnerable to climate change they are called "highly climate vulnerable". This applies to many countries in Sub-Saharan Africa, fragile states or failed states like Afghanistan, Haiti, Myanmar, and Somalia, as well as to Small Island Developing States. In the cases where developing countries produce only small quantities of greenhouse gas emissions per capita but are very vulnerable to the negative effects of global warming, the term "forced riders" as opposed to the "free riders" has been used as a descriptor. Such countries include Comoros, The Gambia, Guinea-Bissau, São Tomé and Príncipe, Solomon Islands and Vanuatu.

Climate vulnerability has been quantified in the Climate Vulnerability Monitor reports of 2010 and 2012. Climate vulnerability in developing countries occurs in four key areas: health, extreme weather, habitat loss, and economic stress. A report by the Climate Vulnerability Monitor in 2012 estimated that climate change causes 400,000 deaths on average each year, mainly due to hunger and communicable diseases in developing countries. These effects are most severe for the world's poorest countries. Internationally there is recognition of the mismatch between those that have caused climate change and those which will suffer the most from climate change, termed "climate justice". It has been a topic for discussion at some of the United Nations Climate Change Conferences (COP).

"When we think about livelihoods at risk from climate change impacts, we know that people living in developing countries, and especially the least-developed countries and small island states, often have the least financial resources to adapt", says Nancy Saich, the European Investment Bank's chief climate change expert.

==== Effects ====
A changing climate also results in economic burdens. The economies in Least Developed Countries have lost an average of 7% of their gross domestic product for the year 2010, mainly due to reduced labor productivity. Rising sea levels cost 1% of GDP to the least developed countries in 2010 – 4% in the Pacific – with 65 billion dollars annually lost from the world economy. Another example is the effect on fisheries: approximately 40 countries are acutely vulnerable to the effects of greenhouse gas emissions on fisheries. Developing countries with large fisheries sectors are particularly affected. During the Cancún COP16 in 2010, donor countries promised an annual $100 billion by 2020 through the Green Climate Fund for developing countries to adapt to climate change. However, concrete pledges by developed countries have not been forthcoming. Emmanuel Macron (President of France) said at the 2017 United Nations Climate Change Conference in Bonn (COP 23): "Climate change adds further injustice to an already unfair world". Economic development and climate are inextricably linked, particularly around poverty, gender equality, and energy.

Tackling climate change will only be possible if the Sustainable Development Goals (SDGs) are met, in particular Sustainable Development Goal 13 on climate action.

Climate stress is likely to add to existing migration patterns in developing countries and beyond but is not expected to generate entirely new flows of people. A report by the World Bank in 2018 estimated that around 143 million people in three regions (Sub-Saharan Africa, South Asia, and Latin America) could be forced to move within their own countries to escape the slow-onset effects of climate change. They will migrate from less viable areas with lower water availability and crop productivity and from areas affected by rising sea level and storm surges.

In spite of the cumulative stressors and challenges faced by developing countries in adapting to the effects of climate change, there are those that are world leaders in the field such as Bangladesh. Bangladesh created a national programme in 2009 focused on how the country would adapt to climate change (the first country to do so). It established a fund to support these plans, spending on average $1 billion annually in this regard.

Many corporations have a higher chance of breaking environmental regulations when financial policies are uncertain. In the article "Economic growth and environmental sustainability in developing economies" written by Ahmed Imran Hunjra, Elie Bouri, Muhammad Azam, Rauf I. Azam, and Jiapeng Dai, they make the claim that businesses tend to cut corners during periods of financial uncertainty. "During uncertain economic conditions, businesses are likely to implement cost-cutting measures that compromise environmental standards. As a consequence, pollution increases as eco-friendly practices are replaced by less expensive alternatives" (p. 18). "FPU has additional cascading effects... policy paralysis; governments may be reluctant to enforce existing environmental regulations or implement new ones" (p. 18). We see that in these economic shock periods and recessions, businesses resort to cost cutting measures at the expense of the environment. In doing so, pollution will increase and result in harm to the environment overall. The term for this is Financial Policy Uncertainty (FPU) which is a big reason why many businesses might not always adopt the green way of conducting business. It might not be in their best financial interest and incur more costs to them. Eco-Friendly practices are not always the cheapest option and many businesses may opt for cheaper alternatives which would save them money but cause harm to the environment. Shocks to the economy slows down environmental progress.

=== Population growth ===
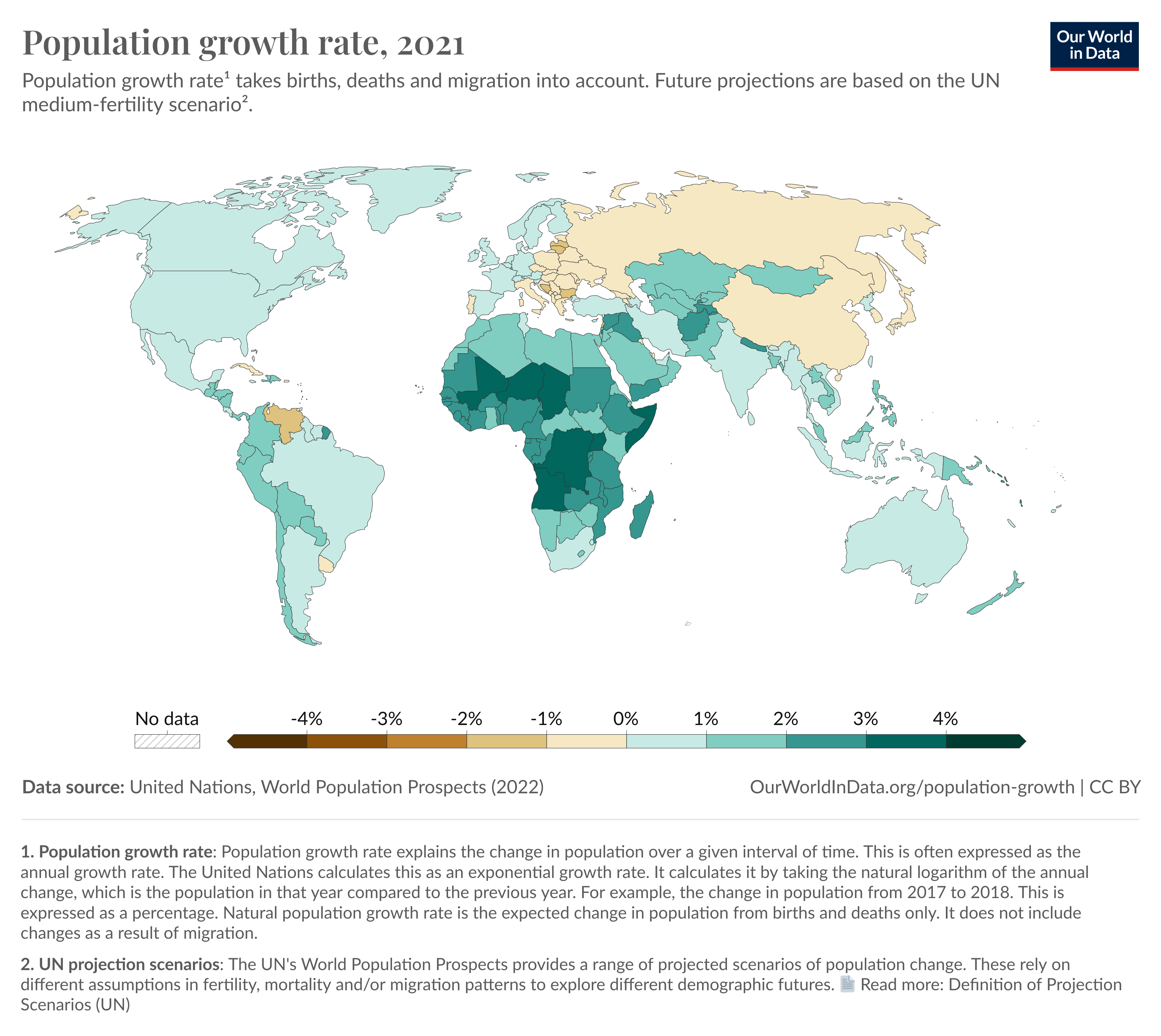
Global rates of population growth and decline (2021); population growth rate takes birth, death, and migration rates into account. Future projections are based on the United Nations World Population Prospects (from 1950 until 2100).

Map of countries by total fertility rate (2022–2023), referring to the average number of children that are born to a woman over her lifetime, according to the Population Reference Bureau.

Over the last few decades, global population growth has largely been driven by developing countries, which often have higher birth rates (higher fecundity rate) than developed countries. According to the United Nations, family planning can help to slow population growth and decrease poverty in these countries.

The violent herder–farmer conflicts in Nigeria, the March 2019 attacks against Fulani herders in Mali, the Sudanese nomadic conflicts and other conflicts in the countries of the Sahel region have been exacerbated by climate change, land degradation, and population growth. Droughts and food shortages have been also linked to the Northern Mali conflict.

=== Poor governance ===
Many developing countries are considered flawed democracies or authoritarian regimes by democracy indices such as the V-Dem Democracy indices and Democracy Index (The Economist). Following decolonization and independence, elites have often had oligarchic control of the government.

The establishment of a healthy democratic state has often been challenged by widespread corruption and nepotism and a low confidence and participation in democratic process. Political instability and political corruption are common problems. To fully reach the goal of a low level of corruption, developing countries are usually using special steps for different establishments inside their territories, such as:

- Development or creation of a fair public administration system that is not partially based on corruption and is entirely based on the values and laws of the country
- Better investigation towards the sources of the corruption and probable causes of that particular action
- Publicly informing the residents about the source of corruption and negative influence on the country's economy
- Regulation of the official positions of an individual to not be the source of abuse for corruption.
- Creation of special laws dedicated to the corruption itself for specific establishments

=== Others ===
Other common challenges include: Increased and intensified industrial and agricultural production and emission of toxic chemicals directly into the soil, air, and water, unsustainable use of energy resources; high dependency on natural resources for livelihood, leading to unsustainable exploitation or depletion of those resources; child marriage, indebtedness (see Debt of developing countries) and underperforming civil service (see Civil service reform in developing countries), food insecurity, illiteracy and unemployment. The economies of many developing nations are tried to primary products and a majority of their exports go to advanced nations. When advanced nations encounter economic downturns, they can quickly transmit to their developing country trading partners as seen in global economic downturn of 2008–2009.

== Opportunities ==
- Human Capital
- Trade Policy: Countries with more restrictive policies have not grown as fast as countries with open and less distorted trade policies.
- Investment: Investment has a positive effect on growth.
- Education
- Aid for Trade: Included in Sustainable Development Goal 8 under Target 8.a.1 Increase aid for trade is an initiative to help developing countries practice trade and benefit. Aid for trade is to assist developing countries in trade related programmes, prioritize trade and trade capacity, improve trade performance and reduce poverty.
- Global partnership: A provision of Sustainable Development Goal 17 which advocates for international investment and support to achieve innovative technological development, access to market, and fair trade for developing countries.

== Country lists ==
=== Emerging and developing economies according to the International Monetary Fund ===
The following are considered emerging and developing economies according to the International Monetary Fund's World Economic Outlook Database, April 2026.

- Afghanistan
- Albania
- Algeria
- Angola
- Antigua and Barbuda
- Argentina
- Armenia
- Azerbaijan
- Bahamas
- Bahrain
- Bangladesh
- Barbados
- Belarus
- Belize
- Benin
- Bhutan
- Bolivia
- Bosnia and Herzegovina
- Botswana
- Brazil
- Brunei
- Burkina Faso
- Burundi
- Cambodia
- Cameroon
- Cape Verde
- Central African Republic
- Chad
- China
- Chile
- Colombia
- Comoros
- Democratic Republic of the Congo
- Republic of the Congo
- Costa Rica
- Djibouti
- Dominica
- Dominican Republic
- Ecuador
- Egypt
- El Salvador
- Equatorial Guinea
- Eritrea
- Eswatini (Swaziland)
- Ethiopia
- Fiji
- Gabon
- The Gambia
- Georgia
- Ghana
- Grenada
- Guatemala
- Guinea
- Guinea-Bissau
- Guyana
- Haiti
- Honduras
- Hungary
- India
- Indonesia
- Iran
- Iraq
- Ivory Coast
- Jamaica
- Jordan
- Kazakhstan
- Kenya
- Kiribati
- Kosovo
- Kuwait
- Kyrgyzstan
- Laos
- Lebanon
- Lesotho
- Liberia
- Libya
- Madagascar
- Malawi
- Malaysia
- Maldives
- Mali
- Marshall Islands
- Mauritania
- Mauritius
- Mexico
- Federated States of Micronesia
- Moldova
- Mongolia
- Montenegro
- Morocco
- Mozambique
- Myanmar
- Namibia
- Nauru
- Nepal
- Nicaragua
- Niger
- Nigeria
- North Macedonia
- Oman
- Pakistan
- Palau
- Palestine
- Panama
- Papua New Guinea
- Paraguay
- Peru
- Philippines
- Poland
- Qatar
- Romania
- Russia
- Rwanda
- Saint Kitts and Nevis
- Saint Lucia
- Saint Vincent and the Grenadines
- Samoa
- São Tomé and Príncipe
- Saudi Arabia
- Senegal
- Serbia
- Seychelles
- Sierra Leone
- Solomon Islands
- Somalia
- South Africa
- South Sudan
- Sri Lanka
- Sudan
- Suriname
- Syria
- Tajikistan
- Tanzania
- Thailand
- Timor-Leste
- Togo
- Tonga
- Trinidad and Tobago
- Tunisia
- Turkey
- Turkmenistan
- Tuvalu
- Uganda
- Ukraine
- United Arab Emirates
- Uruguay
- Uzbekistan
- Vanuatu
- Venezuela
- Vietnam
- Yemen
- Zambia
- Zimbabwe

Countries not listed by IMF

- Abkhazia
- Cuba
- North Korea
- Sahrawi Arab Democratic Republic
- South Ossetia

=== High income countries by World Bank (IMF emerging and developing only) ===
- Antigua and Barbuda
- Bahamas
- Bahrain
- Barbados
- Brunei
- Chile
- Costa Rica
- Guyana
- Hungary
- Kuwait
- Nauru
- Oman
- Palau
- Panama
- Poland
- Qatar
- Romania
- Russia
- Saudi Arabia
- Seychelles
- St. Kitts and Nevis
- Trinidad and Tobago
- United Arab Emirates
- Uruguay

=== Upper middle income countries by World Bank ===
- Albania
- Algeria
- Argentina
- Armenia
- Azerbaijan
- Belarus
- Belize
- Bosnia and Herzegovina
- Botswana
- Brazil
- Cape Verde
- China
- Colombia
- Cuba
- Dominica
- Dominican Republic
- Ecuador
- El Salvador
- Equatorial Guinea
- Fiji
- Gabon
- Georgia
- Grenada
- Guatemala
- Indonesia
- Iraq
- Iran, Islamic Rep.
- Jamaica
- Jordan
- Kazakhstan
- Kosovo
- Libya
- Malaysia
- Maldives
- Marshall Islands
- Mauritius
- Mexico
- Micronesia, Fed. Sts.
- Moldova
- Mongolia
- Montenegro
- North Macedonia
- Paraguay
- Peru
- Philippines
- Samoa
- Serbia
- South Africa
- Sri Lanka
- St. Lucia
- St. Vincent and the Grenadines
- Suriname
- Thailand
- Tonga
- Turkey
- Turkmenistan
- Tuvalu
- Ukraine
- Vietnam

=== Lower middle income countries by World Bank ===
- Angola
- Bangladesh
- Benin
- Bhutan
- Bolivia
- Cambodia
- Cameroon
- Comoros
- Congo, Rep.
- Djibouti
- Egypt
- Eswatini
- Ghana
- Guinea
- Haiti
- Honduras
- India
- Ivory Coast
- Kenya
- Kiribati
- Kyrgyzstan
- Laos
- Lebanon
- Lesotho
- Mauritania
- Morocco
- Myanmar
- Namibia
- Nepal
- Nicaragua
- Nigeria
- Pakistan
- Papua New Guinea
- São Tomé and Príncipe
- Senegal
- Solomon Islands
- Tajikistan
- Tanzania
- Timor-Leste
- Togo
- Tunisia
- Uzbekistan
- Vanuatu
- Venezuela
- West Bank and Gaza
- Zambia
- Zimbabwe

=== Low income countries by World Bank ===
- Afghanistan
- Burkina Faso
- Burundi
- Central African Republic
- Chad
- Congo, Dem. Rep.
- Eritrea
- Ethiopia
- Gambia
- Guinea-Bissau
- Liberia
- Madagascar
- Malawi
- Mali
- Mozambique
- Niger
- North Korea
- Rwanda
- Sierra Leone
- Somalia
- South Sudan
- Sudan
- Syria
- Uganda
- Yemen

=== Countries and regions that are graduated developed economies by the IMF ===
In December 1979, the International Monetary Fund revised its classification of "industrial countries" to include the following "more developed primary producing countries": Australia, Finland, Iceland, New Zealand, the Republic of Ireland and Spain. Previously, its list of industrial countries had been limited to the G7 major economies (Canada, France, Italy, Japan, the United Kingdom, the United States and West Germany) and Austria, Belgium, Denmark, Luxembourg, the Netherlands, Norway, Sweden and Switzerland. Greece and Portugal were reclassified as industrial countries in October 1989, and the group was renamed the "advanced economies" with the inclusion of the Four Asian Tigers and Israel in May 1997, "in recognition of the declining share of employment in manufacturing common to all of these economies". The following is a list of countries and regions that were historically considered to be developing, but are now listed as advanced economies (developed countries and regions) by the IMF:

- Australia (since 1980)
- Finland (since 1980)
- Iceland (since 1980)
- Ireland (since 1980)
- New Zealand (since 1980)
- Spain (since 1980)
- Greece (since 1989)
- Portugal (since 1989)
- East Germany (became part of Germany in 1990)
- Hong Kong (since 1997)
- Israel (since 1997)
- Singapore (since 1997)
- South Korea (since 1997)
- Taiwan (since 1997)
- Cyprus (since 2001)
- Slovenia (since 2007)
- Malta (since 2008)
- Czech Republic (since 2009)
- Slovakia (since 2009)
- Estonia (since 2011)
- Latvia (since 2014)
- Lithuania (since 2015)
- Croatia (since 2023)
- Bulgaria (since 2026)

Five economies lacked data regarding their development status before being listed as advanced economies:

- San Marino (since 2012)
- Macau (since 2016)
- Puerto Rico (since 2016)
- Andorra (since 2021)
- Liechtenstein (since 2025)

=== Newly industrialized countries ===
Ten countries belong to the "newly industrialized country" classification. They are countries whose economies have not yet reached a developed country's status but have, in a macroeconomic sense, outpaced their developing counterparts:

- Brazil
- China
- India
- Indonesia
- Malaysia
- Mexico
- Philippines
- South Africa
- Thailand
- Turkey

=== BRICS countries ===
Ten countries belong to the "emerging markets" groups and together form the BRICS organisation:

- Brazil (since 2006)
- Russia (since 2006)
- India (since 2006)
- China (since 2006)
- South Africa (since 2010)
- Egypt (since 2024)
- Ethiopia (since 2024)
- Iran (since 2024)
- United Arab Emirates (since 2024)
- Indonesia (since 2025)

== Society and culture ==
=== Media coverage ===
Western media tends to present a generalized view of developing countries through biased media coverage; mass media outlets tend to focus disproportionately on poverty and other negative imagery. This common coverage has created a dominant stereotype of developing countries: "the 'South' is characterized by socioeconomic and political backwardness, measured against Western values and standards." Mass media's role often compares the Global South to the North and is thought to be an aid in the divide.

Mass media has also played a role in what information the people in developing countries receive. The news often covers developed countries and creates an imbalance of information flow. The people in developing countries do not often receive coverage of the other developing countries but instead gets generous amounts of coverage about developed countries.

== See also ==
- Colonialism
- Developed country
- Economic miracle
- International development
- Land reform
- List of countries by wealth per adult
- Women migrant workers from developing countries
