= Alexei Buzu =

Moldovan economist

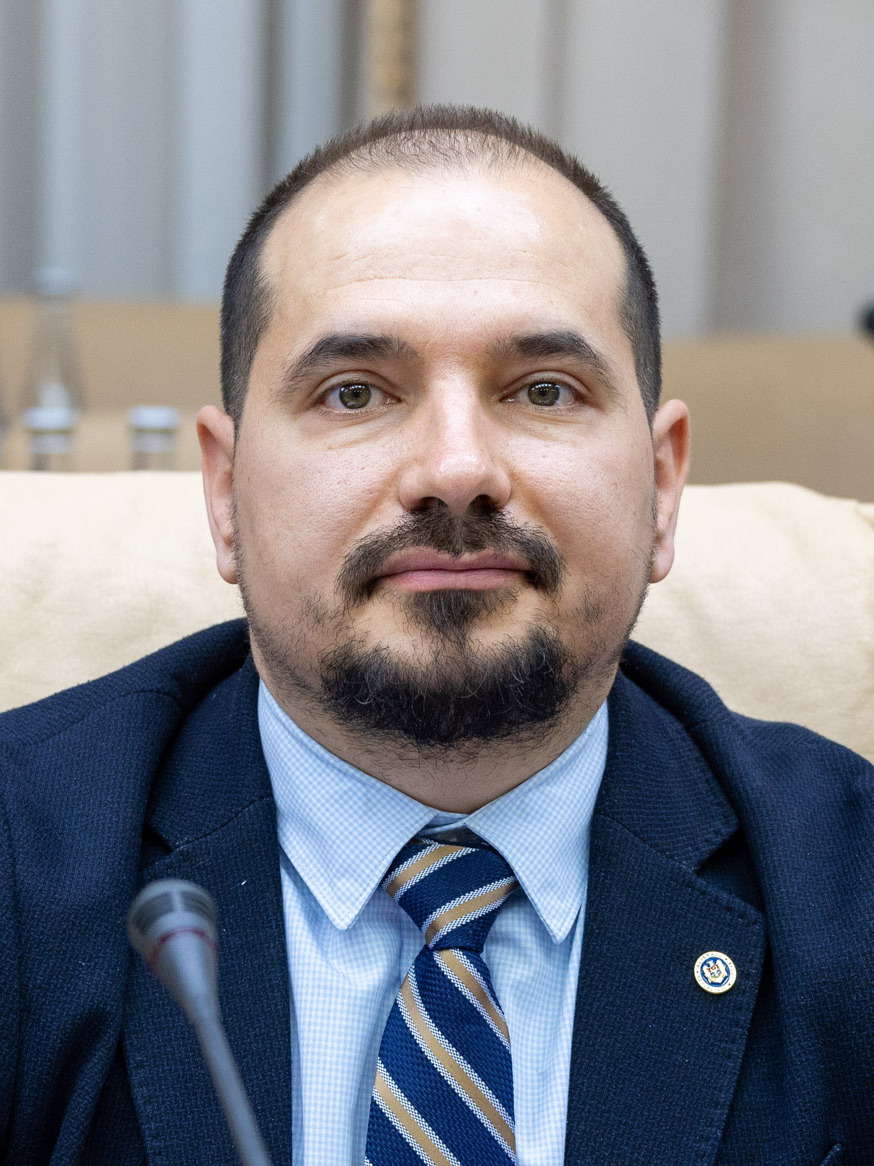
- Official portrait, 2025

Secretary General of the Government of Moldova
- Incumbent
- Assumed office 5 November 2025
- President: Maia Sandu
- Prime Minister: Alexandru Munteanu; Eugen Osmochescu (acting); Vasile Tofan
- Preceded by: Artur Mija

Minister of Labour and Social Protection
- In office 9 January 2023 – 1 November 2025
- President: Maia Sandu
- Prime Minister: Natalia Gavrilița; Dorin Recean
- Preceded by: Marcel Spatari
- Succeeded by: Natalia Plugaru

Personal details
- Born: 19 December 1983 (age 42) Ratuș, Moldavian SSR, Soviet Union
- Education: Academy of Economic Studies of Moldova

Alexei Buzu (born 19 December 1983) is a Moldovan economist and public policy expert with extensive experience in social protection, gender equality, and international development. Since 2025, he is serving as the Secretary General of the Moldovan Government in the Tofan Cabinet.

== Education ==
Buzu earned a Bachelor's Degree in economics and finance from the Academy of Economic Studies of Moldova in 2005. He is a native Romanian speaker and speaks English and Russian fluently.

== Career ==
From 2012 to 2023, Buzu was the Director of the Development Partnership Center, a prominent Moldovan non-governmental organization focused on governance, social inclusion, and capacity building. During this period, he also worked as a consultant for numerous international organizations, including the Crisis Management Initiative in Finland, the World Bank, the United Nations, the Council of Europe, and the European Union.

Between 2021 and 2022, Buzu led and contributed to several high-level gender equality assessments and strategy evaluations in countries such as Liberia, Zambia, North Macedonia, Armenia, South Africa, Thailand, and across the Asia–Pacific region. He worked with the Global Gender Help Desk, UN Women, and the Council of Europe to advance gender mainstreaming and policy development both in Moldova and internationally.

Buzu has frequently collaborated with UNDP Moldova, providing expertise on inclusive growth, local governance, and gender-responsive budgeting. He also supported the Moldovan government in drafting the Voluntary National Review for the 2030 Agenda for Sustainable Development.

Throughout his career, Buzu has provided consultancy for organizations such as UNICEF, UNFPA, GIZ, the Swedish Police Authority, and the Swiss Agency for Development and Cooperation, contributing to projects on youth policy, demographic security, gender analysis, and public sector reform.

Buzu's earlier work includes strategic consulting for USAID/Internews, Terre des hommes, and Soros Foundation Moldova, focusing on media development, child protection, and good governance.

In January 2023, Buzu was sworn into office as Minister of Labour and Social Protection, in the presence of Prime Minister Natalia Gavrilița and President Maia Sandu.
