= Civil service reform in developing countries =

Improvement of governmental services

Civil service reform is a deliberate action to improve the efficiency, effectiveness, professionalism, representativity and democratic character of a civil service, with a view to promoting better delivery of public goods and services, with increased accountability. Such actions can include data gathering and analysis, organizational restructuring, improving human resource management and training, enhancing pay and benefits while assuring sustainability under overall fiscal constraints, and strengthening measures for performance management, public participation, transparency, and combating corruption.

The academic literature on civil service reform has provided arguments and counterarguments clarifying how several approaches to reform affect the overall performance of the civil service. The increasing availability of empirical data allows to test the effectiveness of specific reforms in a given context. While designing effective civil service reforms is a tremendously complex task considering that the right mix of corruption control and performance improvements may vary greatly across and within countries, empirical as well as qualitative research can contribute to the body of evidence-based knowledge on civil service reforms in developing countries.

== Approaches to civil service reform ==
=== The influence of Weberian bureaucracy ===
Max Weber's model of the ideal type of public administration has been an influential approach to civil service reforms in the 20th century. The bureaucratic type of administration contrasts with the patrimonial type in its underlying organizing principles. Weber's organization of the public administration relies on a clearly defined hierarchical structure with a system of subordination and supervision, a division of labor and specified positions with assigned responsibilities. Contrary to the patrimonial system in which there is no distinction between private and public domains, the Weberian bureaucracy is defined by its impersonal and impartial character. Civil servants operate according to a set of rules and procedures they must observe. Impartiality is in part attained through the professionalization of the civil service and meritocratic recruitment through competitive examinations. For full-time and professionalized civil servants, public office-holding becomes a 'vocation'.

Weberian ideal-typical principles have served as foundations for civil service reforms in developing countries. Scholars and policymakers have been interested in identifying the specific features that determine bureaucratic efficiency and corruption and the mechanisms through which these features increase effectiveness and restrict corrupt behaviour in the civil service.

Empirical studies found that meritocratic recruitment of public officials in particular is associated with lower corruption levels. There are several ways in which meritocratic recruitment and promotion can restrict corrupt behaviour. To begin with, administering entry examinations and educational attainment requirements enable the selection of competent civil servants. A study by the International Monetary Fund shows that better-educated civil servants are related to lower levels of corruption, better performance including better public finance management and higher tax revenue mobilization, as well as higher economic growth.

Furthermore, the internal promotion and career stability of merit-recruited civil servants create a sense of shared commitment to the 'vocation' of office-holding that establishes 'esprit de corps', making it harder for corruption to occur.

Other evidence suggests that a professional merit-based civil service preempts corruption not necessarily through the selection of capable officials but rather through the appointment of civil servants whose interests differ from politicians'. Misaligned interests create a coordination problem which prevents corrupt practices and instead introduces a system of mutual monitoring.

=== Employment and pay reforms ===
During the 1980s, developing countries subject to structural adjustment programs (SAPs) experienced fiscal austerity notably manifested through pressures to reduce the public wage bill. R. Klitgaard raised concerns that falling civil service wages could exacerbate bureaucratic inefficiencies and corruption. Low public sector wages have been associated with lower performance and motivation. Salaries below opportunity cost can induce civil servants to opt for potentially harmful adaptive strategies and seek opportunities for own-account activities. Public officials may ask for compensation through informal or illegal means and these coping strategies compromise the efficiency and honesty of civil service organizations.

Given these arguments, increasing public officials' wages and other employment benefits has been an important aspect of the civil service reform agenda in developing countries. Economic models based on the early work of Becker and Stigler have had a particular influence on the policy debate.

Principal-agent models of corruption in the civil service provide a theoretical analysis of the relationship between public service pay and corruption. The shirking model (Shapiro–Stiglitz) is centred on the choice public officials who have the opportunity to be corrupt must make. These rational utility-maximizing agents decide to engage in morally hazardous behaviour based on a cost-benefit analysis equating the expected returns to corruption (bribes) to the costs of being corrupt (penalties, potential foregone future earnings). Corruption is detected with a certain probability and is punished by job loss or other penalties. The model predicts that, all else equal, higher wages can deter corruption by increasing the value of behaving honestly. However, when bribes are high and punishment and the probability of detection are low, substantial increases in public official's wages may be required to preempt bribery. Another model explaining bureaucratic corruption, the fair-wage model, makes a distinction between need-based and greed-based corruption. According to this theory, public officials are not necessarily driven by greed but find corruption tempting when their salaries do not allow to meet subsistence levels. 'Fairness' is also determined by other factors, such as the salaries of peers within the civil service, private sector wages, social expectations and the status of civil servants. The perception of not being paid a fair wage increases corruptibility and also reduces the moral costs of corruption. This model therefore suggests that even modest increases in salaries ensuring 'fair wages' can reduce civil servants' propensity to solicit and accept bribes.

The theoretical linkage between public salary increases and corruption remains ambiguous. In a context of constrained government fiscal resources, the question of cost-effectiveness to design optimal wage policies arises. A cross-country study by Van Rijckeghem and Weder endeavours to find empirical support for the fair-wage and efficiency wage hypotheses. The authors conclude that relative government wages are negatively and significantly correlated with measures of corruption but that eradicating corruption would necessitate unrealistic increases in relative wages. These correlations, however, cannot be interpreted as evidence of a causal relationship going from public sector wages to corruption. Causality may run in the reverse direction, pervasive corruption has been shown to reduce tax revenue collection and public expenditures. Poor public finance performance and strong budgetary pressures due to corruption may in turn sustain low civil service salaries. This endogeneity problem complicates the understanding of the relationship between pay reforms and corruption.

Klaus Abbink also tests the fair salary hypothesis in a laboratory experimental setting. The controlled environment in this experiment allows to isolate and identify the impact of 'fair income' considerations on corrupt behaviour. He finds that public officials in two treatments with different perceptions of 'fairness' behave similarly in a bribery game. In other words, high relative public officials salaries do not alter decisions to be corrupt through fairness considerations. These experimental results substantiate Van Rijckeghem and Weder's findings and cast doubt on the cost-effectiveness of increasing public salaries to combat corruption.

Di Tella and Schargrodsky provide additional evidence with their micro-empirical analysis on wages and auditing during a crackdown on corruption in Buenos Aires, Argentina, in 1996–97. They argue that wage increases can be effective only when combined with intermediate levels of monitoring intensity (the probability of detection in the shirking model). They test their hypotheses using variations in audit intensity during the crackdown on corruption in public hospitals and find that procurement officers' wages alone have no statistically significant effect on corruption but detect a negative relationship when wages are interacted with audit intensity. The authors make the case that higher wages and monitoring ("carrots and sticks") should be used simultaneously to act as an effectual anti-corruption strategy.

The literature on public officials' salaries and corruption offers mixed or inconclusive evidence and seems to indicate that pay increases is a necessary but insufficient condition for curbing corruption.

Wage hikes could also have varying effects depending on whether reforms focus on base-salary (unconditional) increases or performance-related pay increases.

=== Decentralization ===
Following the dissatisfaction with centralized forms of governance, decentralization of public service provision to sub-national governments became a global trend, particularly in developing countries. Decentralization is the transfer of authority, resources and responsibilities from higher to lower levels of government. Scott and Rao distinguish three types of decentralization:

- Administrative decentralization refers to the ability of local governments to hire, fire and set terms of reference for their own employees and on the human resource management and government organization framework.
- Under Political or Democratic Decentralization, power is transferred to lower levels of government, public officials are elected by local citizens and are accountable to citizens rather than to the central government.
- Fiscal Decentralization involves assigning responsibilities for expenditures and revenues to local governments. The degree of fiscal decentralization varies according to local governments' ability to raise revenues and the extent to which they are given autonomy in allocating their expenditures.

Countries differ in their degree of administrative, political and fiscal decentralization. For instance, in China there is a devolution of administrative and fiscal responsibilities but no political decentralization whereas it is the opposite in India.

There are several theoretical arguments supporting that decentralization can improve governance and reduce corruption. To begin with, decentralization is believed to bring the government closer to its citizens and to improve the allocation of resources at the local level. The optimal output level of a local public good (at which citizens' marginal benefit equals marginal cost of providing the good) varies across localities because of differences in preferences and costs. Considering that sub-national governments have better information about the preferences and circumstances of their constituencies, they can tailor the provision of public goods according to these preferences, thereby increasing efficiency and total welfare. This idea goes back to F. Hayek's argument in his essay "The Use of Knowledge in Society" (1945). Hayek asserts that since knowledge is decentralized ("the knowledge of the particular circumstances of time and place"), it follows that decisions and control over resources should be decentralized (a necessary although not sufficient condition for achieving optimal allocation).

However, principal-agent models demonstrate there can be tradeoffs in transferring decision-making responsibilities. Under these theoretical frameworks, central public officials are assumed to be public-spirited principals and local officials act as self-interested agents. On the one hand, public good delivery can be better adapted to local needs but on the other hand, the decisions are made by agents whose interests differ from the principal. Delegating authority can result in 'control loss' or 'abuse of power'. Decentralization can be more effective than centralized decision-making if the gains from adaptability can outweigh the control loss. The overall effects of decentralization on governance and welfare will therefore depend on the degree to which the principal's and agent's interests are opposed and the principal's ability to exert control over the agent's actions.

It has also been argued that decentralization can enhance accountability in the service delivery mechanism. Local governments' proximity makes it more feasible for citizens to monitor and hold public officials accountable. The accountability mechanisms work through political decentralization. In a functional local democracy, local elections constitute an 'incomplete contract' enabling citizens to remove non-performing local officials from office. However, as Bardhan and Mookherjee argue, local democracy may not operate effectively in practice in developing countries and may be captured by local elites.

Furthermore, decentralization can reduce corruption by creating horizontal competition between local governments. Tiebout make the case in a 1956 paper that residents' and factors of production's mobility across localities can reduce the monopoly power exercised by local public officials with respect to regulations and bribes. Fiscal and political decentralization encourages inter-jurisdictional competition that pressures sub-national governments to efficiently deliver local public goods. If citizens are dissatisfied with their local government's performance, they can move to other regions, thereby decreasing tax revenues in less efficient jurisdictions. A similar argument concerning the relationship between a decentralized bureaucratic structure and bribe payments has been explored in the academic literature. Rose-Ackerman suggests that a decentralized civil service can reduce bribery since competition between public officials would bid down bribe payments. Vishny and Shleifer further develop this argument, they build a model where citizens and businesses require more than one service or good from several public officials. If government services are substitutes, then the competitive regime still applies. However, when government services are complementary and in the case of a decentralized bureaucratic structure, firms or citizens are facing several independent bureaucrats. Decentralization might therefore lead to a lack of coordination among bribe-seeking bureaucrats and a "Tragedy of the Commons" outcome where public officials ask bribe payments that are too high, thereby increasing the burden that corruption imposes on firms and citizens.

Diaby and Sylwester empirically test these hypotheses in a cross-country regression and find that bribe payments are higher under a more decentralized bureaucratic structure. Yet Fisman and Gatti detect a strong negative correlation between fiscal decentralization (as measured by subnational share of total government spending) and corruption. Treisman (2000) examines correlations between eight different measures of decentralization with various measures of corruption and service delivery performance. The same measure of fiscal decentralization used by Fisman and Gatti appears not to be significantly correlated with corruption measures.

Decentralization is a complex process which manifests itself in various forms. The design and impetus for decentralization are specific to each country, which complicates comparisons of a single conception of decentralization. The literature on decentralization experiences in several developing countries suggests the effects of decentralization on public sector performance and corruption are likely to be ambiguous and highly context-specific. The empirical work appears to be inconclusive as various types of decentralization were examined using different measures. What's more, measuring corruption as bribery without paying attention to special interest capture may provide an inaccurate assessment of the impact of decentralization. As Bardhan and Mookherjee argue, bribery may decrease while being replaced by local elite capture as a result of decentralization.

Treisman purports that the theoretical and empirical arguments about decentralization and governance refer to specific types of decentralization. He identifies five types: structural, decision, resource, electoral and institutional decentralization and develops arguments clarifying how each type affects the quality of government. While some types of decentralization can improve governance and reduce corruption, others can undermine government performance, this can in part explain the mixed empirical evidence on the effects of decentralization.

=== Top-down performance monitoring ===
Rather than structuring rewards and penalties for corrupt behaviour, another approach to civil service reform seeks to increase the probability that corrupt activity will be observed. Theoretically, monitoring can reduce information asymmetries so that the principal can induce the agent to choose the optimal level of effort and the optimal degree of corrupt activity. As the agent compares his expected payoff of being honest to that of being corrupt, increasing the probability of getting caught and punished will deter corrupt behaviour.

Civil service auditing by the principal or third parties serves an accountability function. The inherent conflict of interest as well as the lack of oversight require independent third parties to certify the reliability of financial reporting, performance results and compliance to rules. Auditors can help exercise oversight by evaluating the efficiency and cost-effectiveness of the delivery of government services. These audits must rely on efficiency measures and pre-determined criteria and benchmarks to assess public servant's performance and the impact of government's programs. Performance auditing can also help detect corruption in public entities. Audits highlight irregularities and areas of inefficiencies that may indicate the existence of corruption. Based on suspicious circumstances, auditors can identify illegal behaviour and collect evidence on misdeeds which can subsequently be used to prosecute public servants at fault. As previously mentioned, successful detection efforts by performance auditing can have a deterrent effect on corrupt activities.

Auditing and prosecution were important elements in Justice Plana's campaign to curb corruption in the Bureau of Internal Revenue in the Philippines. Appointed as the new Commissioner of the corrupt Bureau of Internal Revenue, Justice Plana's anti-corruption strategy focused on implementing a new performance evaluation system, gathering information on corruption through intelligence agents and audits and effectively prosecuting corrupt tax officers. While Justice Plana's campaign was a multi-faceted approach, the higher monitoring intensity combined with a highly credible threat of punishment were particularly successful in deterring corrupt behaviour in the Bureau of Internal Revenue. According to Professor Magtolis-Briones, the threat of being detected and prosecuted decidedly lead officials to reconsider their decisions to engage in corrupt activities.

In Georgia, the success of anti-corruption reforms especially relied on top-down monitoring and prosecution but Schueth warns about the potential abuses of monitoring when fighting corruption. The crackdown on corruption in the tax agency involved coercion such as the use of extra-legal surveillance systems to ensure public officials' observance of the new procedural codes.

Laboratory experiments provide evidence on the impact monitoring. In a controlled bribery experiment in Ouagadougou, Burkina Faso, Armantier and Boly observed that monitoring and punishment can be an effective anti-corruption policy. The researchers had two treatments, low monitoring and high monitoring. While the 'low monitoring' treatment proved effective in curbing bribery, they could not detect significant treatment effects on bribery in the 'high monitoring' treatment. The authors suggest that high monitoring intensity can crowd out intrinsic motivations to behave honestly.

Serra compare the effectiveness of top-down and bottom-up monitoring in a laboratory bribery game between public officials and private citizens. The experimental results suggest that top-down auditing is ineffective in deterring bribery, this may be especially true in weak institutional environments. However, the researcher found that combining formal top-down auditing and bottom-up monitoring created an accountability mechanism that was effective in curbing corruption.

=== Bottom-up monitoring and reforms ===
An alternative approach to improving governance and combating corruption that has gained prominence in recent years is encouraging grassroots participation by community members in local monitoring to induce bottom-up pressures for reform. The 2004 World Development Report: Making Services Work for Poor People is centred on this grassroots approach to development. Community participation is now considered an important component of reforms aiming to improve public service delivery and corruption at the local level.

Bottom-up models of governance involve community members participating in the service provision process by allowing them to monitor public officials, to have a say in policymaking, and keep service providers accountable to incentivize them to deliver public goods and services efficiently.

J. Stiglitz argues that community members, as beneficiaries of public goods and services, will have more incentives to monitor and ensure that governments programs are successful compared to indifferent central bureaucrats. In particular, project involving local citizens will be more likely to succeed since community participation helps sustain efforts towards the long-term continuation of projects necessary to keep them effective.

Nevertheless, B. Olken contends that grassroots monitoring for public goods and services may be impaired by a free-rider problem and suggests that government provision of private goods (subsidized food or health care) may generate more incentives to monitor service provision as each community member has a personal interest in securing the effective delivery of goods and in minimizing extortion by public officials. Stiglitz indeed recognizes that grassroots monitoring of public good delivery is in itself a public good and that as such, it is under-provided.

A bottom-up project, the Citizen Report Card (CRC), pioneered by the NGO Public Affairs Center (PAC) was implemented in 1993 in Bangalore, India. This project aimed at gathering local citizens' feedback on civil service performance and publicizing the results through the media, thereby exerting public pressures for the public service to improve its performance and launch reforms. In 1993, the report cards revealed low levels of citizens' satisfaction with service providers, and the expectation was that report cards would serve as an accountability mechanism that would bring forward issues of service provision quality and corruption levels in the public service. While this initiative did raise awareness on such issues, there was some but not dramatic improvement in service delivery quality between 1994 and 1999. However, the difficulty of measuring improvements in service quality other than through subjective measures restricts opportunities to rigorously evaluate this bottom-up initiative.

Participatory Budgeting in Porto Alegre, Brazil, is known among scholars and policymakers as an enduring example of bottom-up reforms. Participatory budgeting allows citizens to voice their demands regarding service delivery improvements, and through negotiations to influence budget funds allocation at the municipality level. This project was initiated in 1989, and is said to have improved access to and the quality of public service provision, especially for lower segments of society. For instance, 27,000 new public housing units were created in 1989 (compared to only 1,700 in 1986), the number of schools quadrupled between 1986 and 1997 while the share of Porto Alegre's budget going to education and health went from 13% in 1985 to about 40% in 1996. Participatory budgeting still has to address some limitations, including lack of representation of the poorest, but its success has led other municipalities in Brazil and public entities in other countries to adopt this initiative.

== Evidence on reform effectiveness in developing countries ==
=== Pay reforms experiences ===
==== Base salary increases for police officers in Ghana ====
In 2010, the Ghanaian government implemented a civil service salary reform, the Single Spine Salary Structure (SSSS) to mitigate pay disparities in the public service. Police officers were the first beneficiaries of this new salary structure as the police service has historically been the least well-paid of public services in Ghana. Their wages unilaterally doubled in an attempt to increase their living standards to reduce bribery (fair-wage hypothesis). Foltz and Opoku-Agyemang assess the impact of this salary reform using a difference-in-difference analysis taking advantage of the exogenous change induced by the policy.

While police officers' wages doubled, the salaries of other civil servants in Ghana and police officers in Burkina Faso stayed the same. The researchers identified two groups, the Ghanaian policemen who received the treatment (higher wages) and the control group consisting of other civil servants (Ghanaian custom officers and Burkinabé policemen) whose wages did not increase.

Using data on bribes paid from 2,100 truck trips between Ghana and Burkina Faso, Foltz and Opoku-Agyemang can observe the differences in interactions with truck drivers between the treated and the control group before the salary reform (2006–2010) and after the salary reform (2010–2012). If assuming group differences would have stayed constant in the absence of the reform (parallel trend assumption), the difference-in-difference coefficient estimate measures the causal impact of the salary increase on Ghanaian police officers' propensity to ask for bribes. The results suggest that the salary reform counterintuitively increased police officers' efforts to extort bribes, the value of the bribes and the total amount truck drivers had to pay on the road. This evidence goes against theoretical arguments on pay reforms in the civil service. Foltz and Opoku-Agyemang posit that these results could be due to the lack of enforcement of anti-corruption laws. Without changing the environment and other incentives facing civil servants, it appears that increasing wages may not have the predicted effects on corruption.

==== Pay for performance reforms for tax collectors in Pakistan ====
Corruption in tax administration has particularly detrimental effects on tax revenue collection, fiscal balance and overall economic performance. Khan, Khwaja and Olken implemented a large-scale randomized experiment in Punjab, Pakistan to assess the impact of performance-based payment schemes for tax collectors. In collaboration with the Punjab provincial government, they randomly allocated tax officials in the provincial urban property tax department into four groups, a control group and three treatment groups corresponding to different pay-for-performance designs.

The three treatment groups differed in the degree to which tax officers' pay was based on revenue collection performance and on other subjective evaluations from taxpayers and the tax department. The 'Revenue' treatment provided incentives depending only on revenue collection exceeding a benchmark while the 'Revenue Plus' scheme tied salaries to tax collection performance as well as accuracy of tax assessment and taxpayers' satisfaction. The last treatment 'Flexible Plus' added several criteria set by the tax department to determine wages. After two fiscal years, Khan, Khwaja and Olken found that across the three treatment groups, tax revenues increased by 9 log points on average which is equivalent to 46% higher growth of revenues compared to the control group.

The 'Revenue' scheme was the most effective in increasing tax collection but the researchers found no effects on accuracy of tax assessment or the satisfaction of taxpayers. They note that pay-for-performance schemes may have tradeoffs: giving excessive incentives to tax officers might increase their bargaining power with taxpayers and lead to more extortion and taxpayers' dissatisfaction. However, Khan, Khwaja and Olken point out that the benefits of pay-for-performance contracts outweigh their costs and suggest they can effective in increasing tax revenue collection.

=== Monitoring reforms ===
==== Random audits in Brazilian municipalities ====
In 2003, the federal government of Brazil created the Controladoria Geral da União (CGU) charged with corruption prevention and internal control. The CGU launched an anti-corruption program, Programa de Fiscalização por Sorteios Públicos (Monitoring Program with Public Lotteries), which consists in randomly selecting municipalities for audits and publicly disseminating the findings. As of 2015, 12 years after the beginning of the reform, there have been 2,241 audits in 1,949 municipalities. Researchers Avis, Ferraz and Finan exploited the random selection to measure the impact of this anti-corruption program. While some municipalities had been audited several times in the past (treatment group), others were being audited for the first time (control group). Since the municipalities were randomly selected, comparing corruption levels among municipalities in the control and treatment group can provide causal estimates of the effects of the reform.

Based on audit reports, they estimate that 30% of the federal funds transferred to municipalities were stolen. However, they find that corruption levels were 8% lower in municipalities that had previously undergone government audits, thereby suggesting that random audits can be an effective policy against corruption. The researchers posit that random audits can reduce corruption by increasing public officials' perceived probability of being detected. They observed that audits also generated spillover effects, neighbouring municipalities were also affected, having an additional neighbour audited decreased their corruption levels by 7.5%. The local media played a role in disseminating information about other municipalities' audit outcomes.

Avis et al. identify several mechanisms through which the audits led to lower local corruption. First, the new program introduce a system of political accountability whereby local citizens can punish dishonest incumbents or reward those who are honest. Audits may have also altered the types of candidates who enter into politics. What's more, negative audit results can generate reputational costs and potential legal punishments.

==== Monitoring a road building project in Indonesia ====
The Kecamatan Development Project (KDP) is an Indonesian government program, financed by the World Bank which funds village-level small-scale infrastructure programs. Benjamin Olken implemented a randomized experiment in which he randomly assigned 608 villages into groups with different audit probabilities prior to the start of a nationwide infrastructure project.

A random sample of villages were informed that the project would be audited by an audit agency once completed. This increased the probability of detection from 4% to 100%. The audit results were publicly disseminated by the auditors during village meetings. Olken also designed experiments to increase local members' participation in 'accountability meetings' where officials in charge of the road-building project expose how the budget will be spent.

To assess the impact of both monitoring mechanisms, the researcher uses a quantitative measure of corruption levels based on engineers' assessment of the quantity of materials used to build the roads and estimated costs. The discrepancies between project's official costs reported by village project leaders and the costs estimated by independent engineers measures missing expenditures which are used as a proxy for corruption in Olken's study. It was estimated that on average 24% of materials were missing based on road samples, suggesting that part of the project funds were diverted. Olken finds that increasing the probability of external audits significantly reduced missing expenditures (by 8%), and that this approach to fighting corruption is cost-effective. Top-down audits were more effective when village elections were close, which implies that local level accountability can be effective in restraining corrupt behaviour. However, the interventions to increase grassroots participation did not have any significant effects on missing funds.

== Challenges and barriers to effective civil service reforms ==
Political economy dynamics condition the success of civil service reforms. North et al. argue that some developing countries function as 'limited access orders' in which elites exclude broad cross-sections of society to maintain an equilibrium that enables them to extracts rents. In such an equilibrium, political elites have no incentives to break down their patronage networks and introduce meritocratic recruitment reforms in the civil service as it would threaten their position and reduce their opportunities for rent-seeking. The clientelist system, on the contrary, can be a powerful mechanism through which elites maintain this 'limited access order'. Considerably depending on clientelist and patronage networks increases the costs of implementing public sector reforms. Elites will therefore be likely to oppose reforms as they stand to lose the most.

Moreover, civil service reforms are costly to implement in the short-term while their benefits will be manifested and reaped in the future. Governments are thus unwilling to make such unappealing investments. The long-term nature of reforms and the reluctance to initiate, gather and maintain support for reforms prevent their implementation in the first place. In a background paper for the 2011 World Bank Development Report, de Weijer and Pritchett appraise that it would take about 20 years to witness improvements in the functional capability of the state. In almost every countries, this exceeds the average duration of a term of office, political incumbents would have no incentives to incur the costs to carry out reforms while the benefits will accrue to future incumbents.

In addition, bureaucratic inertia and resistance to change should not be overlooked. Bureaucrats may be disinclined to accept changes brought by civil service reforms. This is especially true in countries where bureaucrats depend on informal or illegal channels to complement their meager salaries.

Institutional structures or types of political regimes also matter for reform implementation and success. In a democratic regime, political incumbents may see it in their interests to initiate bureaucratic reforms if voters value and acknowledge the public benefits of reforms. However, demand for civil service reforms remains weak in developing countries. Even if bureaucratic corruption is condemned across countries, the internal demand for anti-corruption reforms is undermined by a collective action problem. Indeed, Persson, Rohstein and Teorell argue that civil service reforms have failed as a result of their mischaracterization of corruption. Most approaches to civil service reform rely on principal-agent frameworks that assume that 'principled principals' are public-spirited and will always take on the task to fight corruption and improve bureaucratic performance. However, the authors contend that, in contexts where corruption is pervasive, actors will not necessarily respond to incentives aiming at altering their behaviour but instead behave based on the extent to which corruption is the expected behaviour in society.

== See also ==
- Employee engagement
- Individuals accountability
- Leadership development
- Organizational culture
- Performance management
- Strategic change
- Talent management
- Training and development
- Transparent management
