= Samuel Paul =

Indian activist

- Born: 11 April 1930; Niranam, Kerala, India
- Died: 26 October 2015 (aged 85)
- Occupation: Former Director-Indian Institute of Management Ahmedabad
- Spouse: Lily Paul
- Children: Annie, Mohan, Neena

Dr. Samuel Paul (11 April 1930 – 26 October 2015) was an Indian scholar, economist, former visiting professor at Harvard Business School, advisor to the World Bank and the UN Commission on Transnational Corporations, and was a professor and the second director of the Indian Institute of Management Ahmedabad.

He served from 8 September 1972 to 30 June 1978. He also taught at the Kennedy School of Government and the Woodrow Wilson School of Public Affairs, Princeton University. Upon his return from Washington to India, he pioneered the creation of citizen report cards, a tool for social accountability. Later, he became the founding chairperson of a new think tank, the Public Affairs Centre India, that has taken his work forward. Other organizations he helped launch include the Public Affairs Foundation, the Coalition Against Corruption, and the Children's Movement for Civic Awareness. He had also been on the Boards of the State Bank of India and several international research centres. In recent years, his focus has been on public governance and related issues. He was the first Asian to be awarded the Jit Gill Memorial Award by the World Bank in 2006. Paul was also the recipient of the Riggs Award for Lifetime Achievement in International and Comparative Public Administration and the Nohria Award of the All India Management Association. Government of India honoured him with Padma Shri in 2004.

Books:

Managerial Economics (co-author), McGraw Hill, 1977, Managing Development Programs: Lessons of Success, Westview Press (USA), 1982, Strategic Management of Development Programs, ILO, Geneva, 1984, Corruption in India: Agenda For Action (co-author), Vision Books, Delhi, 1997, Holding the State to Account, Books for Change, Bangalore, 2002, Who Benefits from India's Public Services (co-author), Academic Foundation, Delhi, 2006, The State of Our Cities (co-author), Oxford University Press, 2012, A Life and Its Lessons (Memoirs), PAC, Bangalore, 2012, Fighting Corruption: The Way Forward, Academic Foundation, Delhi, 2013. The Paradox of India's North-South Divide (co-author), Sage, Delhi, 2015.
