= Centre for Policy Research =

Indian Public Policy Think-tank

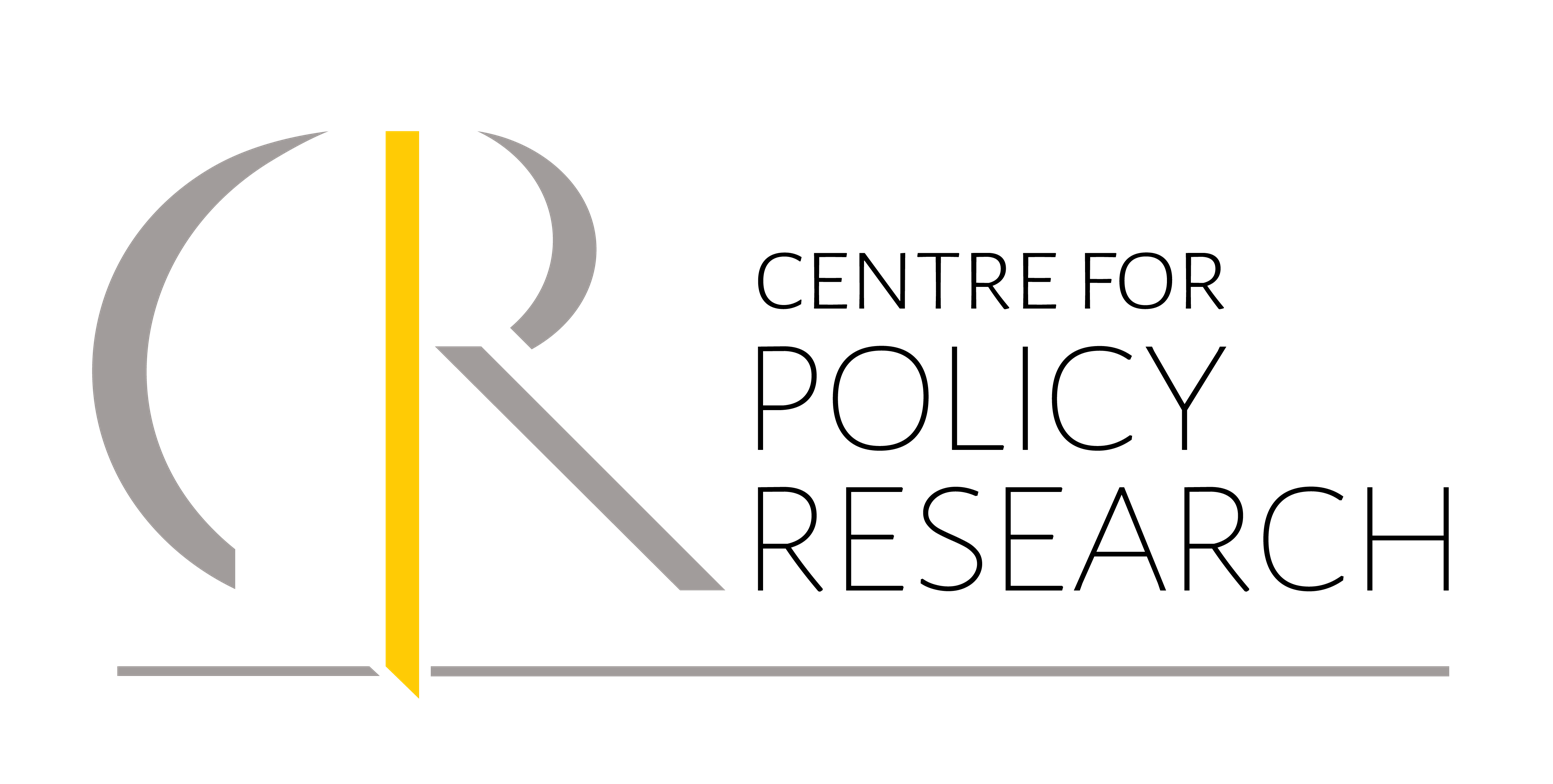
- Abbreviation: CPR
- Type: Public Policy Think Tank
- Headquarters: Dharam Marg, Chanakyapuri, New Delhi – 110021
- Location: New Delhi, India
- President and Chief Executive: Srinivas Chokkakula
- Staff: 30
- Website: www.cprindia.org

The Centre for Policy Research (CPR) is an Indian think tank focusing on public policy. Established in 1973 and located in New Delhi, it is one of the national social science research institutes recognized by the Indian Council of Social Science Research (ICSSR).

The objectives of CPR are to develop substantive policy options on matters relevant to the Indian polity, economy and society; to provide advisory services to governments, public bodies and other institutions; and to disseminate information on policy issues through various channels. The governing board of CPR consists of various public figures from Indian government, academia, and industry.

== Research areas ==
Based on the profiles of its faculty members, CPR focuses on the following research areas.

- Urbanization and Infrastructure
- International Relations
- Internal and External Security
- Law and Society
- International Environmental Law
- Legislative Research (through PRS Legislative Research)
- Political Economy and Governance
- Service Delivery
- Economic Development

== Funding ==
CPR, being a non-profit organisation, receives its funds from:

- Its own corpus
- Grants obtained for research
- From governmental bodies for assistance
- International agencies and private sector sources
- Educational Testing and Policy Research
- Bill and Melinda Gates Foundation
- Open Society Foundation
- World Resources Institute

== Controversies ==
In 2015, the Delhi Police registered a criminal complaint for breach of trust against faculty member Pratap Mehta and the Center for Policy Research in connection with a recruitment scam at the Airports Authority of India (AAI). The CPR's examination cell had been awarded a contract for conducting examinations for recruitment at the AAI. However, there were allegations that the examination results were tampered with to favour certain candidates. The CPR's examination cell has since been shut down.

On 7 September 2022, the Income Tax Department Officers conducted raids on CPR premises to investigate possible violations of the Foreign Contribution (Regulation) Act, 2010. The FCRA registration was suspended on 27 February 2023 and eventually canceled on 10 January 2024.

== Notable faculty members ==
Notable academics in CPR's core faculty from various fields of public policy include:

- Brahma Chellaney
- Bharat Karnad
- Pratap Bhanu Mehta
- G. Parthasarathy
- Lavanya Rajamani
- Shyam Saran

== International Faculty Collaborators ==
- Patrick Heller
