= Marcel Spatari =

Moldovan politician (born 1981)

Marcel Spatari MP
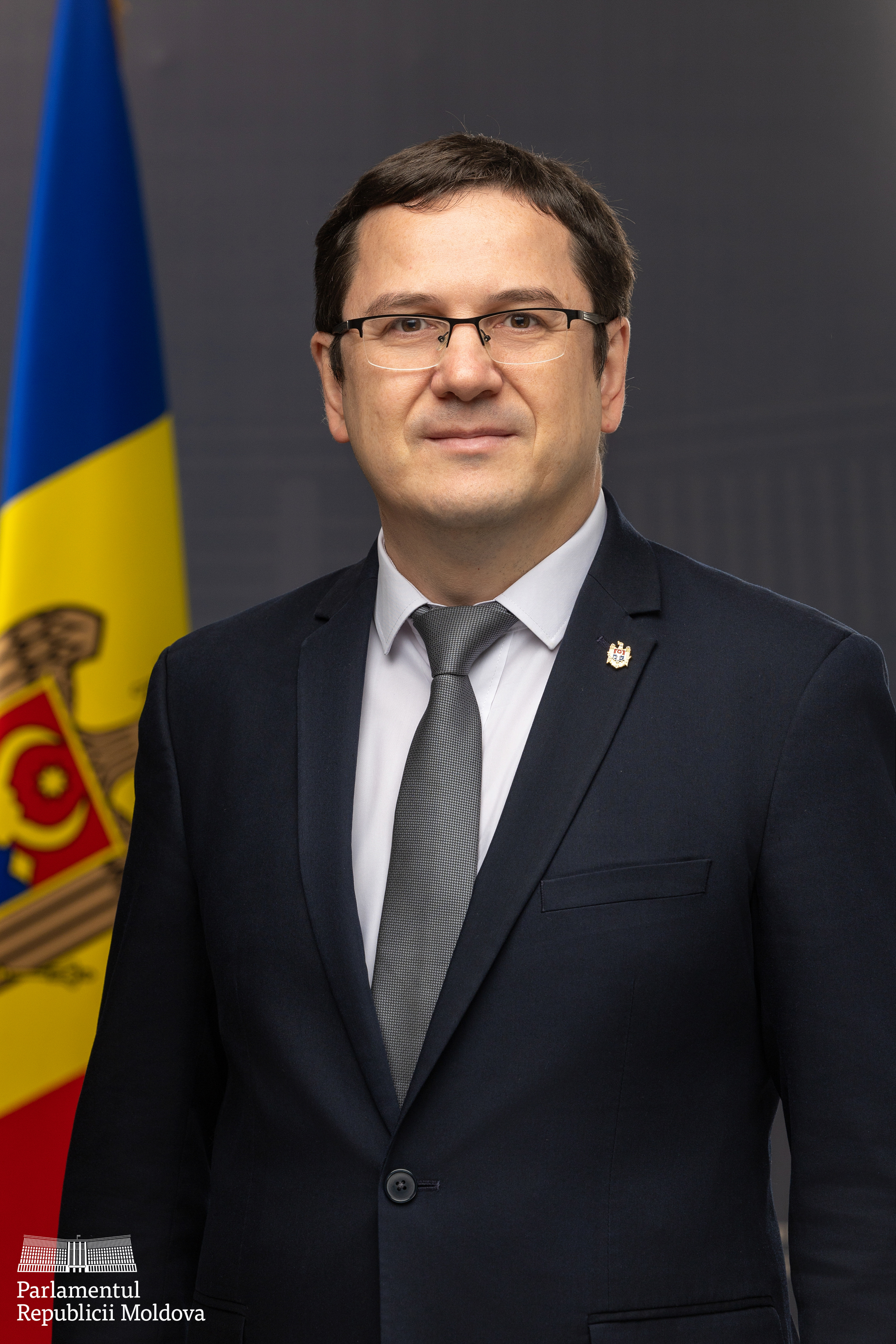
- Official portrait, 2025

Member of the Moldovan Parliament
- Incumbent
- Assumed office 22 October 2025
- Parliamentary group: Party of Action and Solidarity

Minister of Labour and Social Protection
- In office 6 August 2021 – 9 January 2023
- President: Maia Sandu
- Prime Minister: Natalia Gavrilița
- Preceded by: Stela Grigoraș (2017) (as Minister of Labour, Social Protection and Family)
- Succeeded by: Alexei Buzu

Personal details
- Born: 13 August 1981 (age 44) Chișinău, Moldavian SSR, Soviet Union
- Education: Moldova State University; College of Europe; University of Nantes

Marcel Spatari (born 13 August 1981) was the Minister of Labour and Social Protection of the Republic of Moldova from August 2021 to January 2023 in the Gavrilița Cabinet.
