= Artur Mija =

Moldovan politician

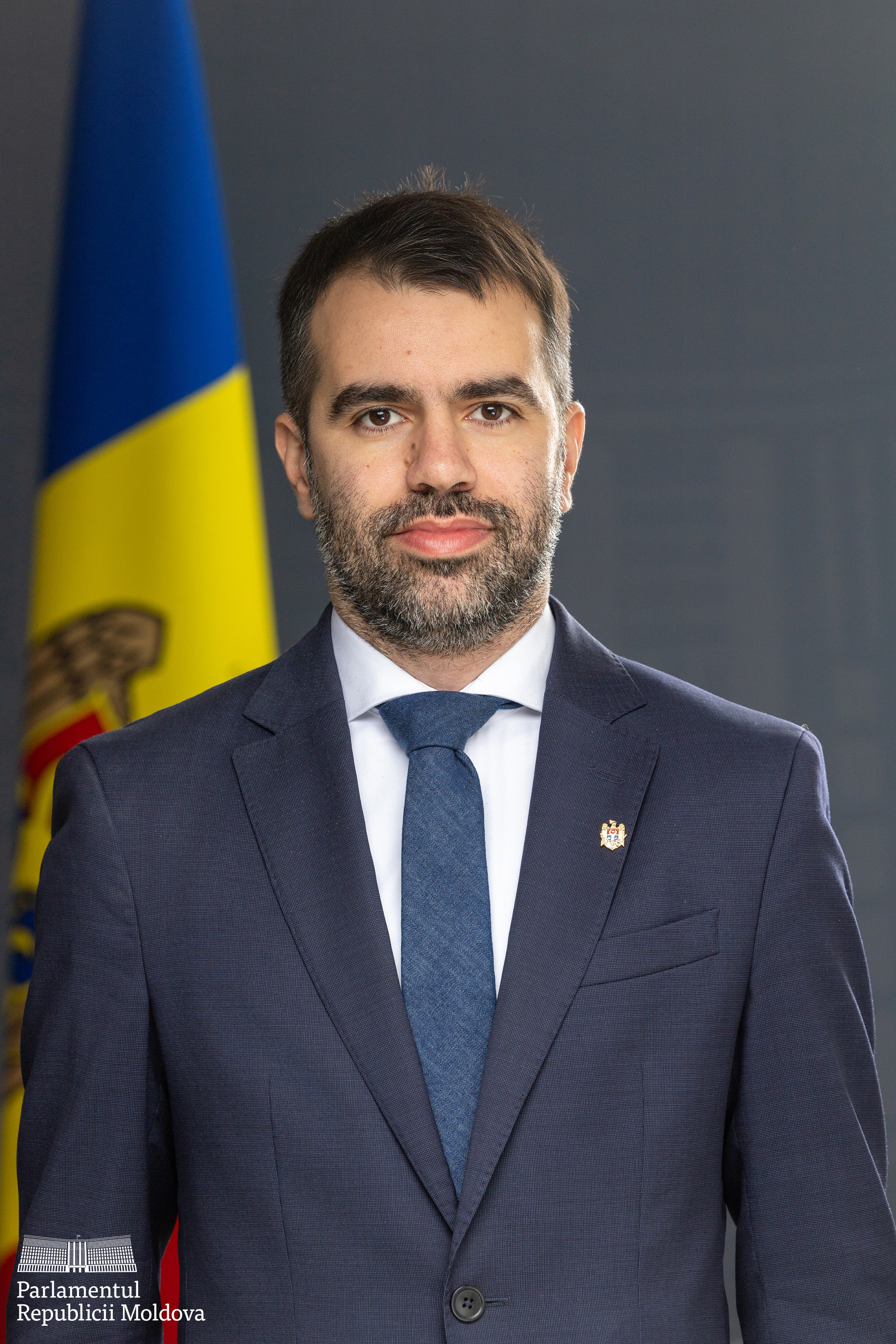
- Official portrait, 2025

Member of the Moldovan Parliament
- In office 22 October 2025 – 1 November 2025
- Succeeded by: Valeriu Carțîn
- Parliamentary group: Party of Action and Solidarity
- In office 23 July 2021 – 17 February 2023
- Succeeded by: Gheorghe Cojoc
- Parliamentary group: Party of Action and Solidarity

Secretary General of the Government of Moldova
- In office 17 February 2023 – 1 November 2025
- President: Maia Sandu
- Prime Minister: Dorin Recean
- Deputy: Lilia Dabija
- Preceded by: Igor Talmazan
- Succeeded by: Alexei Buzu

Personal details
- Born: 7 November 1990 (age 35) Chișinău, SSR Moldova, Soviet Union
- Party: Party of Action and Solidarity (since 2016)

Artur Mija (born 7 November 1990) is a former Moldovan politician. He served as member of the Moldovan parliament from 2021 until 2023 and in 2025. He was the Secretary General of the Government of Moldova from 2023 until 2025. He is a member of the Party of Action and Solidarity and was the Secretary of the party between 2022 and 2025.
