= Bharat Karnad =

Indian academic

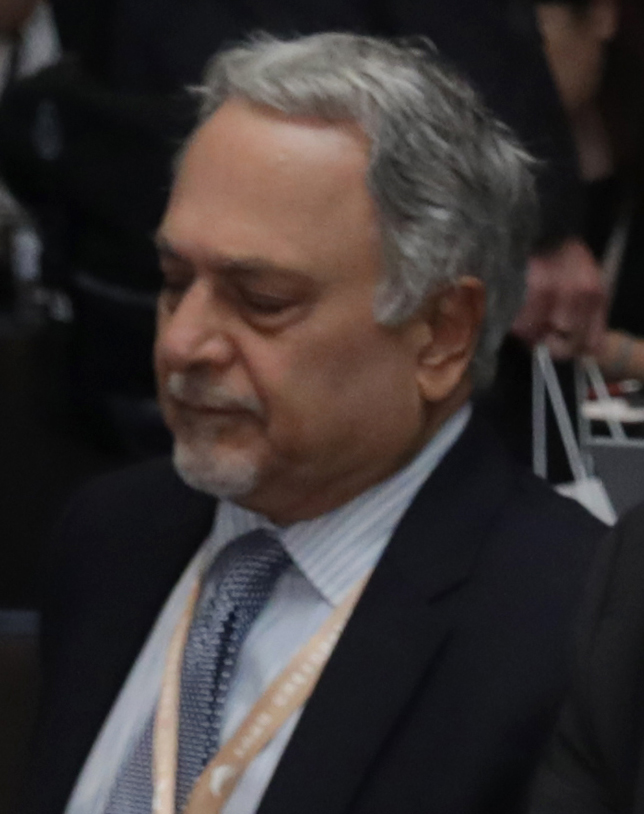
Bharat Karnad at the 2019 Yushan Forum held in Taipei, Taiwan.

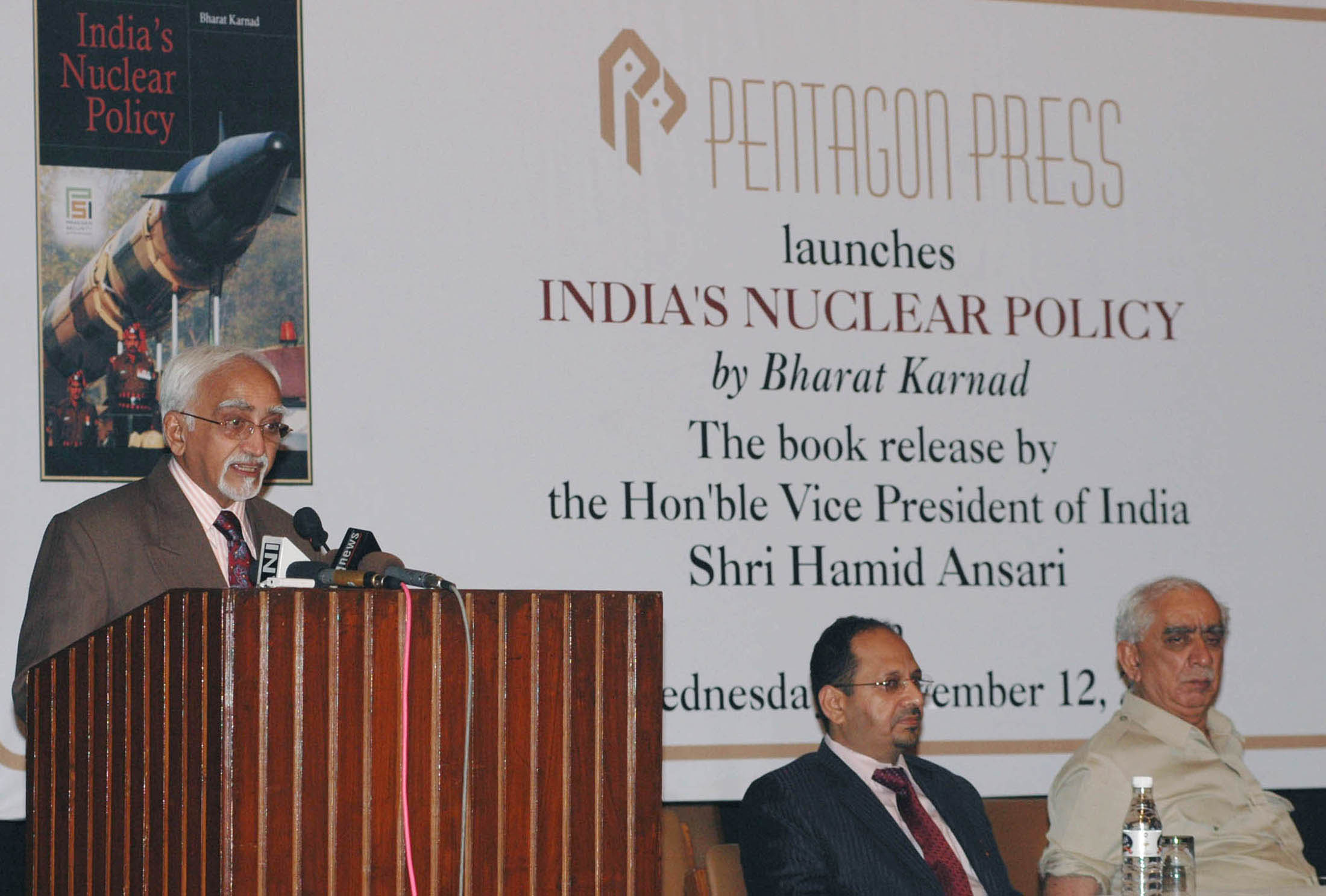
Former Indian Vice-president Mohammad Hamid Ansari at the release of India’s Nuclear Policy written by Karnad in 2008

Bharat Karnad is an emeritus professor in National Security Studies at the Centre for Policy Research, Delhi and a national security expert. He is the author of India's Nuclear Policy (Praeger, 2008), Nuclear Weapons and Indian Security: The Realist Foundations of Strategy (Macmillan India, 2002, 2005) and author-editor of Future Imperilled: India's Security in the 1990s and Beyond (Viking-Penguin India, 1994).

== Early life and career ==
He holds a bachelor's degree in political science from the University of California, Santa Barbara and received a Masters in political science from University of California, Los Angeles in 1975. Karnad served as a Member of the National Security Advisory Board, National Security Council, Government of India, and Member of the Nuclear Doctrine Drafting Group, and formerly Advisor, Defense Expenditure to the Finance Commission, India. He has been a visiting scholar at Princeton University, the University of Pennsylvania, the Shanghai Institute for International Studies, and The Stimson Center in Washington. He is frequently contacted by the Indian government and the Indian military for policy suggestions. He is also a regular lecturer at the highest military training institutions and forums and conducts an annual Strategic Nuclear Orientation Course for senior armed forces officers for the Integrated Defence Staff, Ministry of Defence.

His latest books include Why India is not a Great Power (Yet) published by Oxford University Press in 2015 and Staggering Forward: Narendra Modi and India's Global Ambition published by Penguin India in 2018 in which he takes issue with Indian Prime Minister Narendra Modi's foreign policy with respect to Pakistan.
