= Patrick Heller =

American sociologist

- Known for: Development Theory in Brazil, India and South Africa

Academic background
- Education: University of California
- Thesis: The Politics of Redistributive Development: State and Class in Kerala, India

Academic work
- Institutions: Brown University, Columbia University
- Notable works: The Labor of Development: Workers and the Transformation of Capitalism in Kerala, India; Social Democracy in the Global Periphery: Origins and Prospects

Patrick Heller is an American sociologist and the director of the development research program at the Watson Institute for International and Public Affairs at Brown University.

== Education ==
Patrick Heller completed his bachelor's degree in arts in Sociology and South Asian Studies (1985) from University of California, Santa Cruz. He then received an MA in sociology from University of California, Berkeley by 1988. He completed his PhD in sociology from University of California, Berkeley in 1994. His thesis was "The Politics of Redistributive Development: State and Class in Kerala, India."

During his studentship, he earned University Fellowship from University of California, Berkeley in 1986–1987, Teaching Award for Outstanding Teaching Assistant at University of California, Berkeley in 1987-1988 and 1989–1990. He won Newhouse Foundation Fellowship in 1990 and Research Fellowship for American Institute of Indian Studies in 1991–92. He subsequently won Chancellor's Dissertation-Year Fellowship and John L. Simpson Scholarship, Institute of International Studies, University of California, Berkeley.

== Academic career ==
Patrick Heller is the Lyn Crost Professor of Social Sciences and professor of Sociology and International Studies at Brown University. From 1995 to 2001, he taught Sociology and International Affairs at Columbia University. From 2001 to 2004, he was elected as the core member in the Network of South Asian Politics and Political Economy at the University of Michigan's Center for South Asian Studies,. He has also served as a visiting fellow at the Princeton Institute for International and Regional Studies and Centre for Policy Studies, Johannesburg and as a visiting scholar at the Institute of Social and Economic Research, University of Durban Westville.

Heller started his career at Brown in 2001 as the director of Development Studies Concentration. In 2006, he became the director of the Program in Political Economy and Development at the Watson Institute. In 2008, he became the Director of Graduate Studies at the Department of Sociology and in 2014 he became the Director of Development Research Program. In 2017, he became the Chair of Department of Sociology at Brown University.

His research focuses on the comparative study of social inequality and democratic deepening. He has collaborated for several projects with Centre for Centre for Policy Research, New Delhi. Patrick Heller's area of research is mainly the comparative study of social inequality and democratic deepening. He explores how democratic institutions and practices can promote more inclusive and more participatory forms of development, by focusing primarily on Brazil, India and South Africa. His article "Deliberation and Development: Rethinking the Role of Voice and Collective Action in Unequal Societies" was published by World Bank and received substantial scholarly attention. He is affiliated with American Sociological Association.

=== Heller's views on Kerala ===
Patrick Heller considers Kerala as a case of 'radical social democracy.' He views the success of Kerala's social democracy closely with the ability of low-income/working class groups as vocal stakeholders within the way the state is governed. Their voice and preferences are made heard, and hold the state accountable. This according to Heller, in turn helps the state to geared towards addressing those issues that are most relevant to the needs of low-income groups. He argues that legacies of egalitarianism, social rights and public trust in Kerala helped the state to encounter the economic and welfare consequences of the COVID-19 pandemic successfully. He was invited as a panelist by Kerala Government for the three-day virtual global conclave that seeks to lay down the roadmap for Kerala's long-term development by factoring in perspectives from top economists, industry leaders, administrators and planners amid a changed world order due to COVID-19. His study revealed that Kochi in Kerala has very high levels of service delivery and associational life. He argued that rapidly growing cities of Kerala (like Kochi) needed to be "States within States", having tremendous autonomy.

== Important publications ==
Patrick Heller has 118 scholarly articles and book chapters in International Journals and reputed publishers

=== Books ===
- Bootstrapping Democracy: Transforming Local Governance and Civil Society in Brazil (co-authored with Gianpaolo Baiocchi and Marcelo Kunrath Silva). Stanford University Press. 2011.
- Social Democracy in the Global Periphery: Origins and Prospects (co-authored with Richard Sandbrook, Marc Edelman and Judith Teichman). Cambridge University Press. 2007.
- The Labor of Development: Workers and the Transformation of Capitalism in Kerala, India. Cornell University Press. 1999.

=== Journal articles ===
- "Local Democracy and Development: The Kerala People's Campaign for Decentralized Planning." American Anthropologist, vol. 106, no. 3, 2004.
- "Democratic Deepening in India and South Africa." Journal of Asian and African Studies, vol. 44, no. 1, 2009.
- "Democracy, Participatory Politics and Development: Some Comparative Lessons from Brazil, India and South Africa." Polity, vol. 44, no. 4, 2012.
- "HEGEMONIC ASPIRATIONS." Critical Asian Studies, vol. 38, no. 4, 2006. (Co-authored with Leela Fernandez)
- "Taking Tilly south: durable inequalities, democratic contestation, and citizenship in the Southern Metropolis." Theory and Society, vol. 39, no. 3–4, 2010.(Co-authored with Peter Evans)
- "Building Local Democracy: Evaluating the Impact of Decentralization in Kerala, India." World Development, vol. 35, no. 4, 2007. (Co-authored with K.N Harilal and Shubham Chaudhuri)
