= Public Affairs Centre India =

Indian think tank

- Public Affairs Centre
- Abbreviation: PAC
- Founded: 1994; 32 years ago
- Founder: Dr. Samuel Paul
- Type: Public Policy Think Tank
- Headquarters: No. 14, Suite 508, 5th Floor, HM Geneva House, Cunningham Road, Bengaluru – 560052
- Location: Bengaluru, India
- Chairman: Sudhakar Rao
- Director: Sujit Kumar Chowdhury
- Website: pacindia.org

Established in 1994 Public Affairs Centre (PAC) conducts action research using data analytics. PAC pioneered the Social Accountability Tools (SATs) which is well received and accepted globally. In doing so, the PAC aims to include the entire community by giving a "voice to the voiceless." As a think tank, it focuses on developing evidence-based research for public policies with actionable points for scalability and applicability. Its current focus is key SDGs to include primary education, health, livelihood and skills and gender which overarches all the SDGs. Through data analytics, it aims to provide accurate and judicious recommendations on key policy concerns, conveying key action points to relevant stakeholders. The PAC also engages in policy engagements and communications activities.

== History ==
In 1992, Samuel Paul, an economist, teacher and management professional, was part of a team that developed a 'report card' on Bangalore's public services. Anchoring on the twin concepts of measurement and comparison, the report cards generated objective and credible citizen feedback on issues related to the delivery of public services like quality, reliability, corruption and satisfaction. The approach received much national and international attention. The public debates the findings triggered and the media interest that issues like corruption generated provided a much needed stimulus to several public agencies in Bangalore to review their performances. These initial responses led to the formal creation of the Public Affairs Centre in 1994 with financial support from the National Foundation for India and the Ford Foundation. Dr. Paul was the founding chairperson.

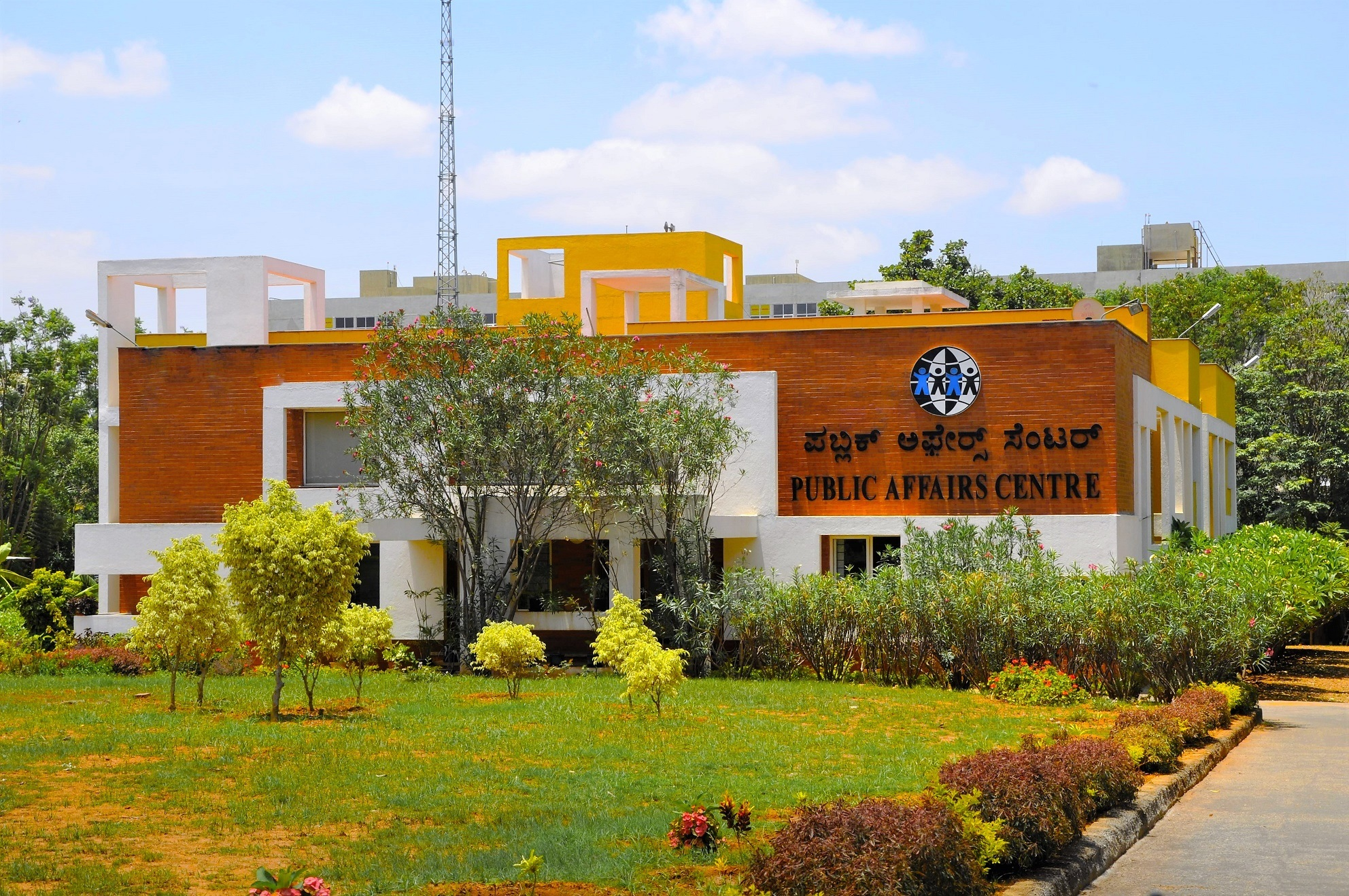
PAC Campus Picture

== Board ==
- Sudhakar Rao, Chairman
- Uma Mahadevan, Member
- H. Sudarshan, Member
- L. K. Atheeq
- Prof. S Sadagopan, Member
- Dr. D. Rajasekhar, Member
- Dr. Sudeshna Mukherjee, Member
- Sujit Kumar Chowdhury, Director
