= Roberta Gatti =

Italian economist

Academic background
- Education: Harvard University
- Influences: Alberto Alesina, Robert Barro

Academic work
- Discipline: Development economics, Political Economics
- Institutions: The World Bank, Washington DC
- Website: Information at IDEAS / RePEc

Roberta Gatti is an Italian economist who currently serves as chief economist of the Middle East and North Africa (MENA) region of the World Bank. She previously served as chief economist for the World Bank's Human Development practice group where she co-led the conceptualization and release of the World Bank Human Capital Index and oversaw the Service Delivery Indicators data initiative.

== Diplomas ==
Gatti did her PhD in economics from Harvard University and graduated (BA) from Bocconi University.

== Career ==
She joined the World Bank in 1998 as a Young Professional in the Macro unit of the Development Research Group. She has since led analytical agendas on growth, firm productivity, gender, social inclusion and labour markets, including as the Global Lead for Labour policies. She has also managed teams and lending portfolios in both the MENA and the Europe and Central Asia regions.
