= 2025 Moldovan energy crisis =

Stoppage of Russian natural gas supply

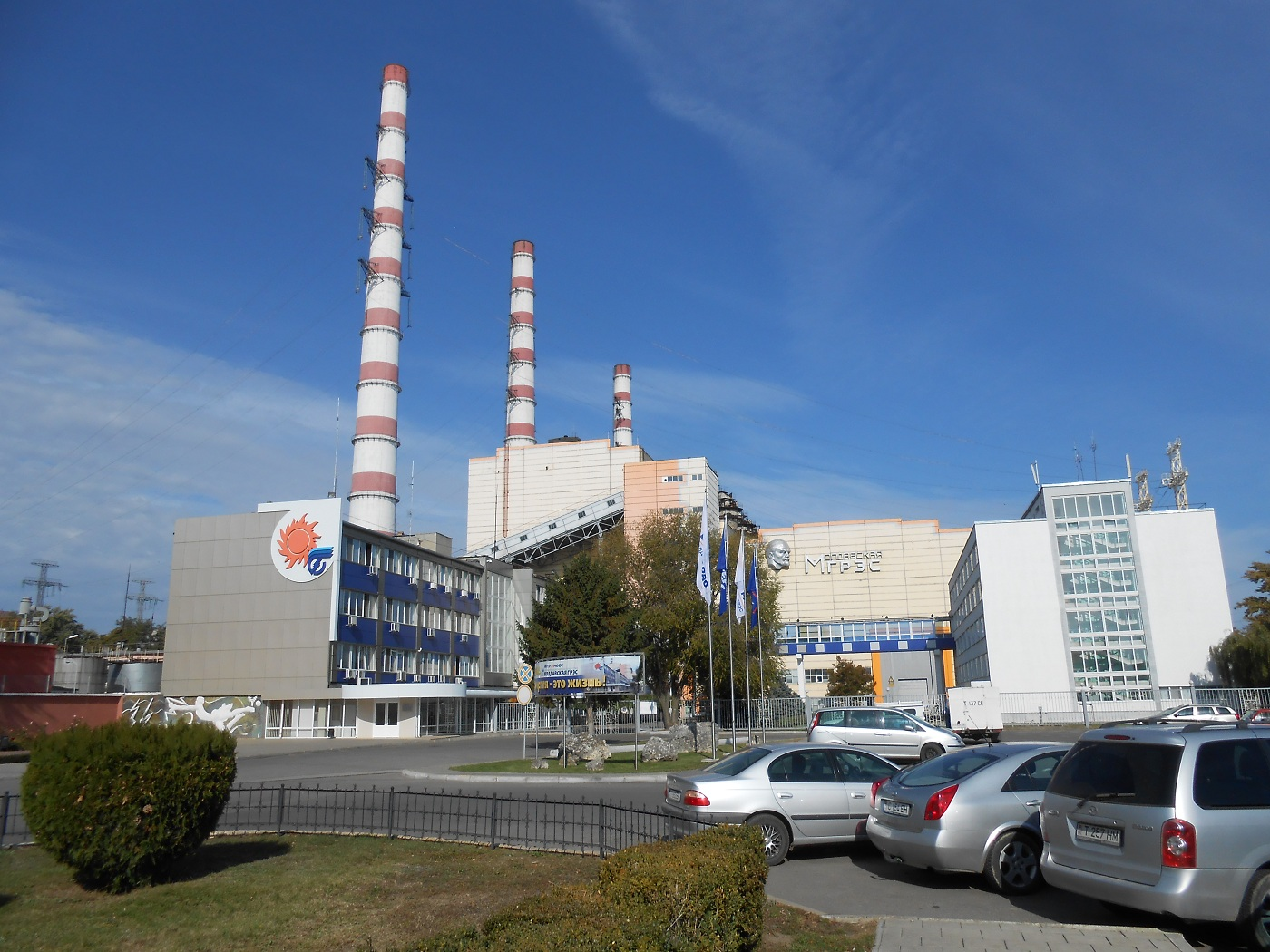
The Cuciurgan power station, located in unrecognized Transnistria. It generated most of Moldova's electricity needs for decades, and ran historically on natural gas supplied by Russia to Transnistria for free.

Moldova's unrecognized breakaway region of Transnistria stopped receiving natural gas supplies from Russia on 31 December 2024, at 19:50 EET (17:50 UTC), as a result of the expiration of Russia's five-year gas transit deal with Ukraine. This kickstarted a nationwide energy crisis; heating, hot water and gas (except for cooking in cities) were completely cut off in Transnistria, while energy tariffs increased sharply and some villages were also cut off from gas in the rest of Moldova. In Transnistria, three people died and several more were injured due to carbon monoxide poisoning, with cases of hypothermia also being reported.

Historically, Transnistria had covered most of Moldova's electricity needs through the Cuciurgan power station, which functioned with Russian gas supplied to Transnistria for free. However, gas supplies stopped reaching Transnistria after Ukraine refused to renew a gas transit deal with Russia in order to deprive the latter of funding for its then ongoing invasion of Ukraine. Russia had the option of continuing the supply through the TurkStream and Trans-Balkan pipelines, but it refused to do so; an energy crisis could benefit Russia in helping bring down the then ruling pro-European Party of Action and Solidarity (PAS) at the upcoming Moldovan parliamentary election later that year, with the Moldovan authorities describing this as the underlying reason for the crisis. On 28 September 2025 the elections were held, with the ruling PAS winning with a reduced majority.

Thus, Moldova began to buy more expensive electricity from Romania, while Transnistria remained without gas until February. During the energy crisis, there was concern about the possibility of a humanitarian crisis in Transnistria, where some 350,000 people lived at the time, and as Transnistria's main sources of revenue came from the use of free Russian gas, including the sale of produced electricity to Moldova, analysts and commentators pointed out that the crisis could lead to the collapse of the breakaway state and its reintegration back into Moldova.

== Background ==
Territorial situation of the Transnistria conflict at the time of the energy crisis. Land controlled and claimed by Transnistria is in red and light red, respectively.

Moldova relied since its independence on the Cuciurgan power station to satisfy most of its electricity needs. This power station is located in Transnistrian-held territory, and it ran on natural gas supplied to Transnistria by Russia for free. Transnistria is an unrecognized breakaway state internationally recognized as part of Moldova, located mainly in Moldova's recognized territory on the left bank of the Dniester river. Transnistria broke away in the Transnistria War of 1992 with the help of Russian forces present in the region today organized into the Operational Group of Russian Forces, comprising about 1,500 troops, mostly locals employed by Russia. 29.1% of Transnistrians declared Russian ethnicity in a 2015 census, and a majority of them speak Russian as their first language.

Moldova paid millions to Transnistria every year in exchange of electricity at below-market prices, effectively financing separatism in its own territory. But after the victory of pro-European Maia Sandu in the 2020 Moldovan presidential election, Moldova approached the European Union (EU) and worked to reduce its dependency on the power station. Thus, if Cuciurgan historically satisfied 70%–90% of Moldova's electricity needs, this figure dropped to 53% in November 2024 and to only 37% in December 2024. Moldova planned to cut itself completely from Transnistrian electricity with the construction of the Vulcănești–Chișinău power line, which was to be completed in late 2025. It would allow Moldova to import sufficient electricity for its needs directly via Romania, avoiding the Soviet-built line that, from Romania, ran first through Ukraine and Transnistria before reaching Moldova's capital of Chișinău.

Transnistria's economy was entirely dependent on free Russian gas, which it used to produce electricity to sell to Moldova, process metal in the Moldova Steel Works in Rîbnița and charge its own population even if at reduced prices, and the termination of this supply of gas had the potential to collapse Transnistria's public budget and risk a humanitarian crisis. Russian gas stopped flowing into Transnistria with the expiration of a five-year gas transit contract between Russia's Gazprom and Ukraine's Naftogaz on 1 January 2025, depriving Russia of important revenue from the export of gas to European countries to fund its then ongoing invasion of Ukraine. Ukraine had already warned in 2023 that it would not renew the contract.

Russia had the option of maintaining the gas supply to Transnistria via the alternative route of the TurkStream and Trans-Balkan pipelines, but it refused to do so. Moldova had a contract with Gazprom on the supply of gas until 30 September 2026. An energy crisis could favor Russia by destabilizing Moldova and helping bring pro-Russian parties back to power in the parliamentary election in the second half of 2025, making Sandu's ruling pro-European Party of Action and Solidarity (PAS) lose its majority. Extensive Russian interference, including through vote buying, had already influenced Sandu's re-election and a referendum to cement EU accession aspirations in 2024; the latter passed only narrowly.

== Prelude ==
=== Negotiations with Gazprom and sackings in Moldova ===
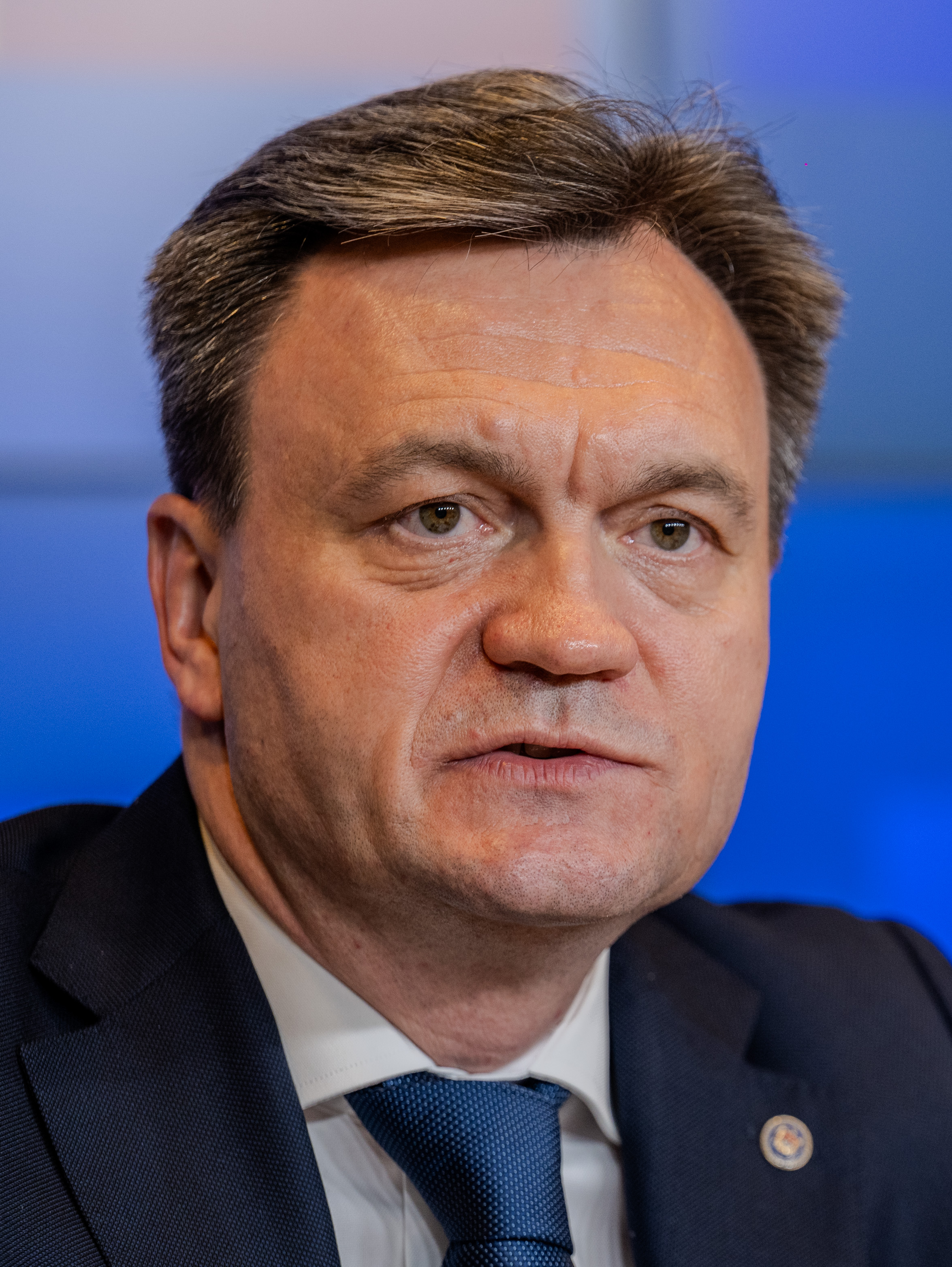
Dorin Recean, the Prime Minister of Moldova throughout the energy crisis, in 2024. Recean called for the resignation of three figures considered responsible for the unfolding energy crisis and requested the establishment of a state of emergency in energy.

On 25 November 2024, Moldova's Minister of Energy, Victor Parlicov, met in Saint Petersburg in Russia with the CEO of Gazprom, Alexey Miller, to discuss the continuation of gas supplies to Transnistria in the context of the expiration of the deal between Gazprom and Naftogaz on 1 January 2025. Parlicov stated on 27 November that Gazprom had made the continuation, quantity and conditions of the supply of gas conditional on Moldova's payment of its debt to the company and that it had indicated Moldova to discuss with Ukraine the extension of the gas transit deal. Parlicov declared that "we must really prepare, from now on, for the crisis scenario of 1 January". At the time, Gazprom claimed that Moldova owed it over 700 million dollars, while Moldova argued it owed only 8.6 million dollars based on the results of an external audit presented in September 2023. President of Moldova Maia Sandu and Prime Minister of Moldova Dorin Recean had stated after the publication of the results that Moldova would not pay non-existent debts.

On 5 December, Recean announced that he had requested the resignation of Parlicov, as he was the responsible for managing the energy sector and "he made mistakes that led us to this situation of crisis". Recean also requested the resignation of Victor Bînzari, the general manager of Energocom (then the national electricity supplier company), as the company "did not manage to secure the gas needs for the winter period at the most advantageous prices"; and Sergiu Tofilat, a member of the supervisory board of Moldovagaz (then the national gas supplier company), as he "blocked the procurement of gas by the responsible institutions when prices were the most affordable". Recean also announced that he would directly assume the role that the energy minister had and that he called for the establishment of a state of emergency in energy starting from 16 December. He managed the energy ministry until Dorin Junghietu's appointment as minister on 19 February 2025.

Also on 5 December, 26 members of the Parliament of Moldova for the Bloc of Communists and Socialists (BCS), the main opposition formation, presented a motion of no confidence against the Recean Cabinet over the energy situation, also calling for early parliamentary elections. Ion Ceban, the Mayor of Chișinău and president of the National Alternative Movement (MAN), called for the resignation of the cabinet and the organisation of early parliamentary elections following Recean's sackings, and so did the Alliance of Liberals and Democrats for Europe (ALDE). The Moldovan parliament rejected the motion on 13 December, with 55 votes against, 18 votes in favor and one abstention, well short of the 55 votes in favor required for a successful motion.

=== Declarations of states of emergency ===
On 11 December, Transnistria's legislature, the Supreme Council, approved a state of economic emergency for a period of 30 days as ordered by the President of Transnistria, Vadim Krasnoselsky, in the face of the possible end of gas supplies to Transnistria. This measure foresaw the rationalization of gas consumption, the creation of a reserve of energy resources, the end of the export of energy resources with the exception of electricity and the preservation of human life and health.

The Moldovan parliament approved two days later the establishment of a nationwide state of emergency for a period of 60 days, which would come into effect on 16 December. 56 of the 101 parliament members voted for its approval. Recean added that this was a necessary measure "so that this winter will be the last in which the Kremlin can threaten our energy security" and that "energy blackmail" would end with the completion of the Vulcănești–Chișinău line that was to connect with Romania. Following this, the Romanian energy minister, Sebastian Burduja, announced that Romania would help Moldova overcome the energy crisis and that the Romanian energy companies Nuclearelectrica and Hidroelectrica were already in talks with Energocom to explore options to supply additional electricity to Moldova.

=== Gazprom's confirmation of the end of gas supplies ===
On 17 December, the Moldovan energy ministry announced that Gazprom had not reserved any capacity to transport gas through the Trans-Balkan pipeline for Transnistria for January 2025 after the auctions for the month took place the previous day. Gazprom formally notified Moldovagaz on 28 December that gas supplies to Moldova would be completely stopped on 1 January 2025 at 08:00 MSK (07:00 in Moldova, 05:00 UTC). Gazprom cited Moldovagaz's alleged failure to fulfill its payment obligations under the contract as the reason, and stated that it retained the right to completely terminate the agreement between the two and demand compensations from Moldovagaz. In response, Recean announced that Moldova would not accept any debt invalidated by the international audit and that Russia was using energy as a political weapon. On the same day, Tiraspoltransgaz, Transnistria's largest gas supplier company, cut off the gas supply to several buildings of the Moldovan authorities in the Security Zone and in the city of Bender (Tighina).

Also on the same day, the opposition Party of Socialists of the Republic of Moldova (PSRM), led by former president Igor Dodon, called on the government, which it blamed for the situation, to find solutions regarding the problem of the debt demanded by Gazprom and re-establish dialogue with Russia to continue the supply of gas and prevent a humanitarian crisis. Recean accused the Socialists of attempting to pressure the government into accepting the 700 million dollars debt, denied the existence of Gazprom's demanded debt and referred to the Socialists as "political speculators of the Kremlin".

On 30 December, Sandu announced that the Moldovan government and its partners had developed a plan to provide humanitarian aid to the citizens in Transnistria, later stating that the Transnistrian authorities had rejected help from Moldova. The Moldovan government increased compensation payments for the increase in energy prices for the period between December 2024 and March 2025. Thus, in December, 500 million Moldovan lei would be used to compensate about 670,000 beneficiaries. The Moldovan authorities accused Russia of trying to destabilise the country through energy blackmail in order to influence the 2025 parliamentary election and undermine Moldova's path towards Europe. Recean asked the Minister of Justice, Veronica Mihailov-Moraru, to prepare the legislative changes that would allow for the nationalization of Moldovagaz, of which at that time Gazprom owned half of all shares, Transnistria 13% and the Moldovan government 35.6%.

On 31 December, Energocom and Moldovagaz imported a small quantity of gas from Bulgaria via Bulgaria, Romania and Ukraine as a test, proving that it was possible to use an alternative route to supply Transnistria with gas as Energocom declared. Moldova's energy ministry announced that Energocom planned to cover 38% of Moldova's electricity needs for January 2025 from local production (over 127,000 megawatt-hours or 28% from the thermal power stations in Chișinău and Bălți and 46,000 MWh or 10% from renewable energy) and that the remaining 62% would be imported from Romania (over 178,000 MWh or 39% from OPCOM's electricity market and 105,000 MWh or 23% from bilateral contracts).

== Energy crisis ==
=== In Transnistria ===
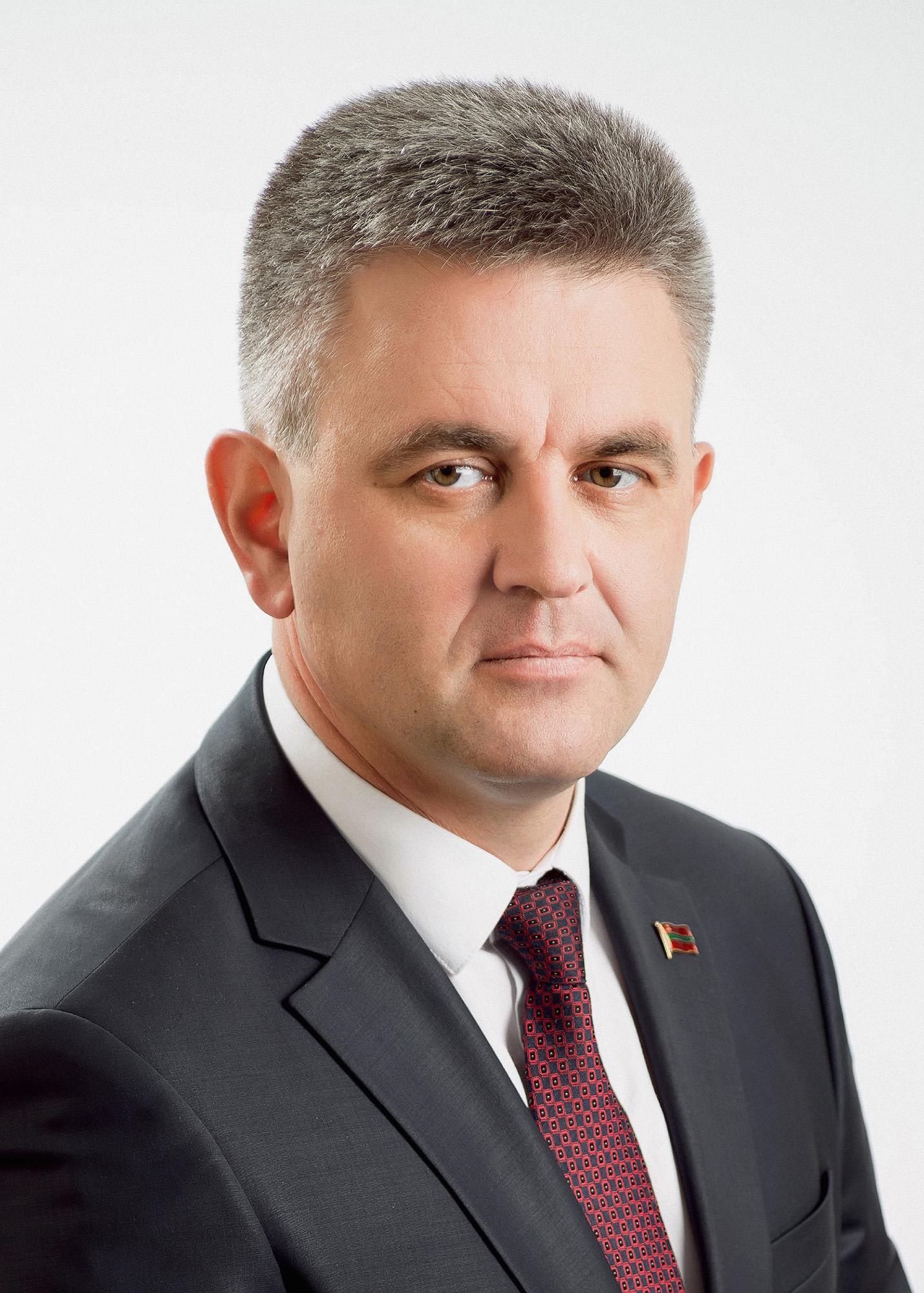
Vadim Krasnoselsky, the President of Transnistria during the energy crisis, in 2016

On 1 January 2025, at 07:00 EET (05:00 UTC), Ukraine stopped the transit of Russian gas to Europe through its territory. The supply of gas to Transnistria through Ukraine stopped earlier, on 31 December at 19:50 EET (17:50 UTC). As a result, heating and hot water were cut off in Transnistria. An exception was made for healthcare and residential care facilities. The use of gas for cooking was permitted until the pressure of the network would drop to a critical level, though gas supplies were completely suspended for the private sector and rural areas. Transnistrian president Krasnoselsky stated that "we knew about this possibility [the end of the transit of gas], prepared for it and were not caught off guard".

The Cuciurgan power station switched from gas to coal for power generation exactly at midnight on 1 January. Coal reserves would reportedly allow for 50 to 52 days of supply, during which Transnistria was to have guaranteed electricity. However, the Moldovan government's crisis centre reported on 4 January that coal reserves for the power station would only last until the end of January, after which Transnistria would be left without electricity. The Dubăsari Dam would remain operational in such case, but its production capacity was much lower, of 24 megawatts at that moment. Regarding gas reserves, Transnistria's amounted to 13 million cubic metres (460 million cubic feet) as of 1 January, initially reported to be enough for 10 days in the north of the region and 20 days in the south, only to be used for cooking and not for heating. However, it was announced on 8 January that Transnistrian localities were consuming an average of 270,000 m^{3} (9.5 million cu ft) of gas per day, so gas reserves would last for 24 days.

According to Transnistria's Minister of Economic Development, Sergey Obolonik, as of 2 January, almost 75,000 households had been disconnected from the supply of gas, while 116,000 would receive a limited amount of gas for the moment. He assured that electricity tariffs would not increase for the Transnistrian population despite the energy crisis. On 6 January, Prime Minister of Transnistria, Aleksandr Rozenberg, stated that 122 settlements were completely cut off from the gas supply, including 51,507 rural households, over 20,000 urban households and 1,800 legal entities and entrepreneurs. Furthermore, on 4 January, one of Tiraspol's districts was left without water. The next day, the Transnistrian authorities warned that the upper floors in high-rise buildings in Tiraspol and Bender could be left without water as a result of a drop in pressure in the network during power cuts, and several settlements in Slobozia District were cut off from water that day.

On 1 January, production facilities and hundreds of businesses put their operations on hold, leaving thousands of people unemployed. The next day, Obolonik stated that all industrial enterprises in Transnistria had stopped their activities, with the exception of those necessary to maintain food security in the breakaway state. He warned of "irreversible changes" as "enterprises will lose the ability to start up" if the gas problem was not resolved soon. On 4 January, the Rîbnița metallurgical plant's general manager Serghei Kornev stated that the plant had ceased operations and could not be reactivated in the near future, leaving over 2,000 workers unemployed and creating risks for the Transnistrian economy. On 10 January, Transnistria's state of economic emergency was extended until 8 February, including that day. The next day, the Rîbnița Cement Plant too stopped its activities, again creating harm for Transnistria's economy. On 13 January, Rozenberg stated that Transnistria was in "very difficult, almost critical conditions"; among other things, he mentioned that Transnistria's imports had fallen by 43% (7 million dollars) and exports by 60% (3.3 million dollars) in the first ten days of 2025. On 15 February, Obolonik stated that industrial activities in Transnistria had fallen by up to 70% due to the energy crisis, adding that "Transnistria has never suffered such a blow to its budget".

Power cuts were first introduced on 3 January, lasting one hour, to be rotated between groups of different regions of the republic at distinct hours, as the energy system would not be producing enough electricity to meet the population's consumption level. They were extended to three hours on 4 January and to four hours on 5 January. Constantin Borosan, secretary of state of Moldova's energy ministry, reported on 5 January that the power deficit in Transnistria had reached around 30% of consumption, about 65 MW, as people were using electric heaters to warm up. According to him, the 30% power deficit could provoke a complete collapse of the region's power system. The power cuts in Transnistria were extended yet again on 7 January to eight hours, two separate cuts of four hours each. On 10 January, the power cuts were reduced to a single rotative cut of five hours. This was made possible, among other things, because a third power generation facility, the Tirotex-Energo power station, was put into operation, to produce 10–15 kilowatt-hour. The power cuts were reduced to three hours on 12 January and back to five the next day.

On 24 January, several hundred people demonstrated in Transnistria at checkpoints on the line of contact with Moldova in Bender, Dubăsari and Rîbnița against an alleged blockage of gas supplies to Transnistria by Moldova. Protestors carried Russian and Transnistrian flags and banners with messages such as "Moldova, let the gas in!", and Krasnoselsky and former Transnistrian president Igor Smirnov were present at the protests. Moldovan government spokesman Daniel Vodă stated that "we know from the experience of other protests in the region that they are coordinated by the so-called authorities directed by Moscow".

=== In the rest of Moldova ===
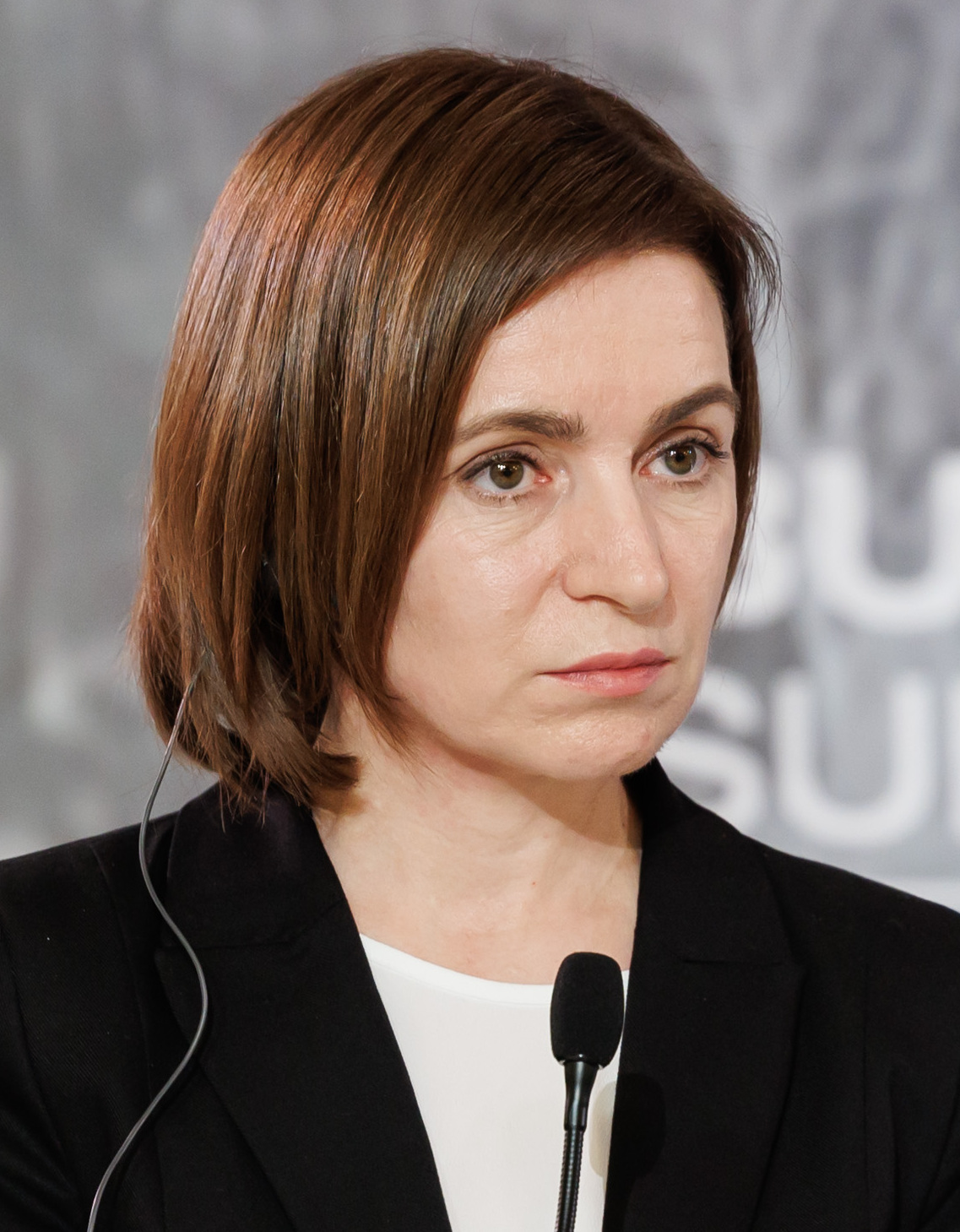
Maia Sandu, the President of Moldova through the energy crisis, in 2023

Electricity supplies to Moldova from the Cuciurgan power station stopped completely on 1 January. Moldova's Termoelectrica company put the CET-1 power station in operation that day. It produced 6 MW, while the CET-2 power station produced 174–175 MW. Throughout the energy crisis, the CET-Nord power station and the Stânca–Costești Hydroelectric Station also helped Moldova produce electricity. Recean stated on 16 January that Moldova would no longer buy electricity from the Cuciurgan power station even if gas supplies to Transnistria were resumed. It could do so if there were guarantees that the supply of gas would not be interrupted again, which Recean did not see possible, adding that "I don't see who could offer such guarantees". He stated, without guarantees, the price for Moldovan consumers ended up being higher despite the cheap price of the electricity from Transnistria.

According to Energocom, the deficit of the electricity system in government-held Moldova was about 600 MW as of 1 January, to be covered not only from the Romanian electricity market and bilateral contracts, but also from Ukraine's Energoatom state-owned energy company. Electricity imported from Romania arrived via the Isaccea–Vulcănești line. The volume of gas exports from Romania to Moldova, carried out primarily through the Iași–Chișinău pipeline, reached a record level of 5 million m^{3} (180 million cu ft) of gas on 3 January and of 5.6 million m^{3} (200 million cu ft) on 17 January, close to the maximum capacity of the pipeline. The supply of electricity also reached on the latter day one of the highest levels since the beginning of the crisis, 660 MW, covering 75% of Moldova's consumption of 886 MW for that day. Romanian energy minister Burduja had declared on 2 January "I consider that we have a moral duty to stand by our brothers across the Prut with everything possible". On 4 January, Borosan announced that Moldova was registering an energy consumption level lower than expected due to the population's receptivity of the authorities' calls to save energy.

On 3 January, Moldova's National Agency for Energy Regulation (ANRE) increased electricity tariffs for Premier Energy consumers in the centre and south of the country by 75% (from 2.34 to 4.10 lei per kWh) and for FEE-Nord consumers in the north by 65% (from 2.84 to 4.68 lei per kWh). Heating tariffs were also increased by 38% in Chișinău, 17% in Bălți and 12% in Comrat. The Ministry of Labour and Social Protection announced it would compensate the increase in energy tariffs to those who had already submitted compensation requests. The next day, Alexandr Petkov, the Mayor of Bălți, called on the Moldovan government to compensate for the damages caused to Bălți by its "incompetent policies" regarding energy security in the face of increased electricity and heating tariffs.

The villages of Copanca and Varnița were also affected by the power cuts in Transnistria, as they were connected to the Transnistrian energy system. All Moldovan-held villages connected to the Transnistrian energy system, more than a dozen in the districts of Anenii Noi, Căușeni and Dubăsari, were disconnected from it on 6 January. Works to reconnect these villages to the gas supply system of the rest of government-held Moldova would be a lengthy process, making it likely that these villages would remain without gas for the remainder of the winter. Dozens of people protested in Copanca on 17 January against changing the connection of the village and paying higher tariffs, with residents blocking works to install transmission towers. The Deputy Prime Minister for Reintegration, Oleg Serebrian, declared that Moldova's "enemies" were attempting to attack stability and hinder Chișinău's help to the region's inhabitants, asking Copanca inhabitants "don't let yourselves be used" and "don't be seduced by promises of cheap gas and free electricity".

Moldovan foreign policy presidential adviser Olga Roșca declared to the BBC on 1 January that "we're treating this not as an energy crisis but a security crisis", which would have been instigated by Russia to destabilize the country socially and economically and "create demand for a return of pro-Russian forces to power" ahead of the 2025 parliamentary election in Moldova. Recean described to Reuters on 3 January the end of Russian gas supplies to Transnistria as a security crisis for Moldova with the aim of allowing the return of pro-Russian forces back to power and "weaponising our territory against Ukraine", adding that Russia had "betrayed" and "isolated" Transnistria.

=== Humanitarian situation ===
After the end of the Russian gas supplies to Transnistria, the energy company Tirasteploenergo urged Transnistrian residents to dress warmly, gather family members together in a single room, hang blankets or thick curtains over windows and balcony doors and use electric heaters, stating that it was forbidden to use gas or electric stoves to heat the apartment, as "this can lead to tragedy". Three dozen heating and temporary accommodation points were equipped across Transnistria, ready to accommodate 1,325 people. The temperature in Tiraspol was set to drop to 1 °C (34 °F) on the night of 1 January.

The day of the end of the gas supplies, 131 schools, 147 kindergartens and 130 administrative buildings in Transnistria were disconnected from heating. Forty kindergartens were kept heated, which would accommodate children whose parents were involved in mitigating the energy crisis. Transnistrian schools were mandated to switch to distance learning, similar to during the COVID-19 pandemic, after the New Year holidays. The holidays were later extended, pupils were to return to class on 20 January, although many schools and kindergartens only reopened after the resumption of gas supplies in February.

On 5 January, Transnistria's Ministry of Health stated that, the previous day, over 500 people presented to outpatient centres in Tiraspol and Bender with fever, of whom a dozen were hospitalised. Isolated cases of hypothermia were also reported. On 6 January, Promo-LEX lawyer Vadim Vieru told Radio Moldova that over 4,000 prisoners in Transnistrian prisons were now without heating, further worsening their conditions of detention.

Transnistria's Ministry of Internal Affairs reported on 5 January that a retired couple had died in Cioborciu from carbon monoxide (CO) poisoning after leaving a stove on and going to sleep. Since the beginning of the year, other two people in Dubăsari, one in Grigoriopol and one in Caragaș had suffered CO poisoning as the ministry reported. Other four people were poisoned in Bender on 7 January, and a woman in Tiraspol died from CO poisoning on 8 January after using a gas water heater to shower without having a chimney. It was reported on 11 January that five more people had been poisoned in the past 24 hours, bringing the total number to 16, including the three deaths. By 18 January, the number of those injured by carbon monoxide poisoning had risen to 20 .

== Resolution ==
=== Rejection of initial Moldovan help offers by Transnistria ===
On 2 January, Moldovagaz and Energocom offered Tiraspoltransgaz assistance, including technical and commercial support, to organise the purchase of gas from any European gas platform at market price. Tiraspoltransgaz rejected this offer, with the Transnistrian authorities stating that this would entail buying gas at a higher price and that a resumption of gas supplies by Gazprom was expected in virtue of the contract expiring in 2026. A Moldovan government source declared to the American digital newspaper Politico that they believed this decision came from Russia rather than from the Transnistrian authorities. The next day, the Moldovan government announced it had alternative energy sources (biomass systems, generators), humanitarian aid and essential medical supplies ready to be sent to Transnistria if the separatist authorities accepted the help. This offer was also rejected. Borosan stated on 5 January that apart from Moldovagaz's and Energocom's offer to Tiraspoltransgaz, the Moldovan government already proposed back in December that Tiraspoltransgaz considered buying gas from the Romanian market as well as that Energocom purchased gas so that the Cuciurgan power station could continue to produce electricity; no response was received to either proposal.

Krasnoselsky said on 6 January that it was a lie that Transnistria had rejected help from Moldova, that no offers had been received from it or any other country and that Moldova's goal was to "strangle" Transnistria; Moldova's reintegration bureau reiterated that Transnistria rejected Moldovan offers of help in response. Furthermore, the Russian embassy in Chișinău stated that Transnistria's situation had been created by the West and Ukraine, that some Moldovan "hot-heads" were proposing to resolve the conflict by force and that these actions "will not go unanswered". Moldova's Ministry of Foreign Affairs summoned Russian ambassador Oleg Ozerov as a result and called the embassy's statements "a cynical attempt to manipulate public opinion" and blame Moldova and Ukraine, when responsibility for the crisis fell only on Russia. After the Russian embassy's declarations, the reintegration bureau stated that "we have every reason to believe that a scenario of destabilization of the situation in the country is being followed", while Recean reiterated that Moldova sought a peaceful reintegration of the country, to commence with the withdrawal of Russian troops from Transnistria.

On 16 January, it was announced that Transnistria had rejected Moldova's proposal for a meeting between political representatives that was to be held the next day to discuss the provision of humanitarian assistance to Transnistria, the creation of a group to manage the crisis and Transnistria's response to a proposal by Ukraine to supply coal for the Cuciurgan power plant. As a result, the next day, Serebrian accused Transnistria of having a "genocidal attitude" towards the civilians on the left bank of the Dniester, "whom they are holding captive". He declared "if you do not want to ask us for help, at least let us help you", and asked that Moldovan medical assistance and generators, as well as Ukrainian coal, be accepted.

=== Search for alternatives ===
Sandu stated on 9 January that she had discussed with the President of Ukraine, Volodymyr Zelenskyy, the possibility of Ukraine supplying coal for the Cuciurgan power station to produce electricity, and that Transnistria in return could provide electricity to Ukraine. Krasnoselsky said on 23 January that the coal offered by Ukraine was not suitable for the power station, as it was gaseous coal rather than anthracite. Zelenskyy stated on 25 January that Ukraine could send a team of specialists to the power plant to adapt it to a different type of coal, which Krasnoselsky rejected as a "speculative option" on 27 January, declaring that it would require a high amount of time and money.

On 15 January, Krasnoselsky announced that an agreement had been reached with Russia for the supply of "humanitarian gas" to Transnistria, with the route, payment and transit still pending negotiation. He had travelled to Moscow from 10 to 14 January, and negotiated with the Ministry of Energy of Russia to restore gas supplies to Transnistria. The Moldovan government allowed the separatist leader's visit, with Sandu stating that Chișinău "does not pose any obstacle to solving the gas crisis" and that it wanted the crisis to end as soon as possible. The same day Krasnoselsky returned from his travel, Tiraspoltransgaz signed a contract with the Moldovan company Natural Gaz DC to supply gas to Transnistria, a maximum of 3 million m^{3} (110 million cu ft) per day. The company's owner, Arcadie Vicol, was arrested the next day by officers of the Security and Intelligence Service of Moldova (SIS), being suspected of "treason and hostile activities in favor of the Russian Federation".

On 17 January, acting president of Moldovagaz, Vadim Ceban, stated that Moldovagaz was the only company that could supply gas to Transnistria according to the contract with Gazprom and that Tiraspoltransgaz had refused to provide its framework agreement with Natural Gaz DC to Moldovagaz. Sandu spokesman Igor Zaharov reiterated on the same day that only Moldovagaz could supply gas to Transnistria. On 20 January, Krasnoselsky announced that Transnistria accepted the supply of gas by Moldovagaz and that Tiraspoltransgaz guaranteed the payment of the supply. The reintegration bureau later clarified that Transnistria had only agreed to allow Moldovagaz to transport gas to Transnistria, with its transit being paid for, and that the gas would be purchased and transported to the Moldovan border by third-party companies. Sandu stated that Moldovagaz would only work with companies that respected Moldovan law and were not subject to international sanctions. On 21 January, the Moldovan energy ministry announced that Gazprom had not again reserved gas transportation capacity in the Trans-Balkan pipeline for the month of February following the auctions for the month the day before. Krasnoselsky stated on 24 January that Transnistria's gas reserves would be exhausted within days.

=== European Union-subsidized resumption of gas supplies ===
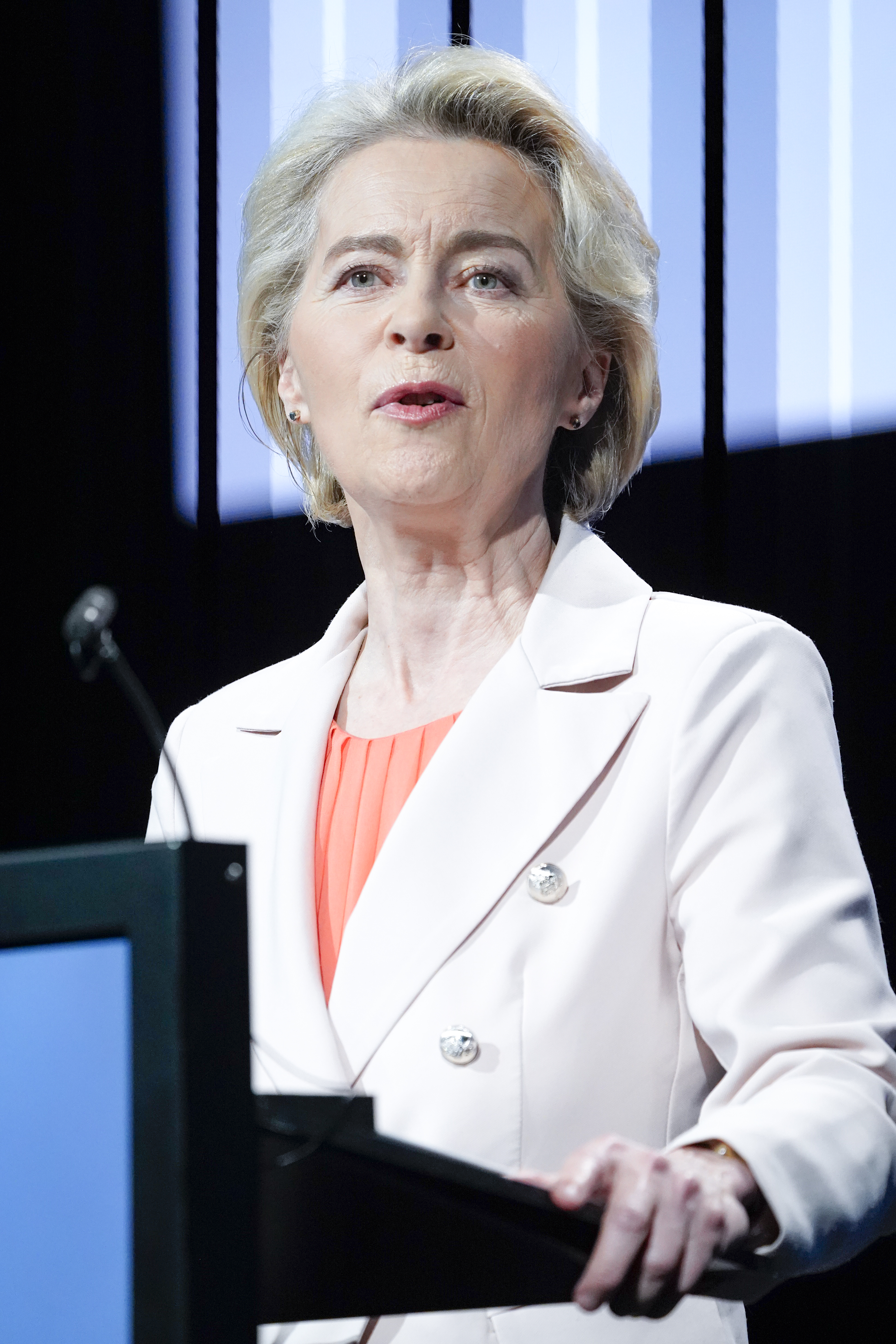
Ursula von der Leyen, the President of the European Commission during the Moldovan energy crisis, in 2024. The European Union provided 20 million euros that allowed the resumption of natural gas supplies to Transnistria on 1 February, for which she was personally thanked by Krasnoselsky.

On 27 January, the European Commission (EC) announced that the EU had proposed an emergency aid package of 30 million euros to help Moldova in the face of its energy crisis. The aid package would finance the purchase of gas from the European market or Ukrainian providers and its transportation to Transnistria. According to Recean, this would apply from 1 to 10 February; Moldova would provide 3 million m^{3} of gas to Transnistria until then to maintain the Transnistrian gas system's pressure. The gas would be a loan, and would have to be returned or paid by Transnistria if it did not accept the EU's help. The aid package was to allow for the production of electricity and heat for Transnistria as well as electricity for the rest of Moldova. In relation to the package, the President of the European Commission, Ursula von der Leyen, declared that "we simply cannot accept that people on our continent do not have access to the most basic services".

Transnistria's Minister of Foreign Affairs thanked the EU on 29 January for the offered help and proposed to organize talks between Moldovan and Transnistrian "specialists" to clarify the details and conditions of the aid package. On the same day, Moldovagaz and Tiraspoltransgaz signed a loan agreement in which the latter committed to returning the requested 3 million m^{3} of gas by 1 March. On 31 January, Recean announced that a final agreement had been reached with which the EU's aid package to Moldova increased to 64 million euros non-refundable: 20 million for the purchase of gas for Transnistria, 10 million for the purchase of electricity for the rest of Moldova and 34 million in budget support for the Moldovan government.

On 1 February, Moldovagaz began supplying gas to Transnistria at 8:30 EET (6:30 UTC). Transnistria received from 1 to 10 February gas purchased by Energocom with the 20 million euros offered by the EU. The gas supplied on 1 February came from Moldova as it was the previously agreed upon 3 million m^{3}; gas supplied on 3 February was newly purchased from the Bulgarian and Romanian markets and transported to Transnistria through the Trans-Balkan and Iași–Chișinău pipelines. The decision to supply Transnistria came after a meeting of Moldova's Commission for Emergency Situations (CSE), which decided that gas, purchased by Energocom on the European or Ukrainian market, would not exceed 3 million m^{3} per day, and would be delivered exclusively to protected consumers, such as households, medical and educational institutions, power stations and small food industry businesses, and not to large industries or cryptocurrency mining farms. Krasnoselsky thanked von der Leyen the day of the resumption and Moldovan "specialists" and leaders two days later, and Moldovan news website Ziarul Național reported that some civilians in Transnistria took to the streets to celebrate the restoration of gas supplies. With the resumption, the Cuciurgan power station switched to gas and its coal-fired unit was closed, power cuts were eliminated and central heating for households was restored. Restoring the gas supply to households would take longer, as it required entering each household. Schools and kindergartens began to reopen in the next few days once temperatures inside were able to reach 18–20 °C (64–68 °F). Energocom reported on 11 February that the amount of gas it purchased for Transnistria between 1 and 10 February was 26.456 million m^{3} (934.3 million cu ft).

On 4 February, the EU announced an offer of 60 million euros for Transnistria to cover its energy needs until mid-April. According to Recean, the aid would be subject to several conditions, namely ensuring respect for human rights and fundamental freedoms in Transnistria, developing a plan to gradually update energy tariffs for Transnistrian consumers to market prices, pledging that large exporting companies pay for energy at market prices and excluding industrial consumers with high energy consumption from the aid package. He announced on 10 February that Transnistria had rejected the offer. On 11 February, Transnistria received another loan of 3 million m^{3} of gas from Moldovagaz, to be returned by 31 March, to maintain the operation of its gas transportation system, and on 12 and 13 February it received 2.59 and 2.70 million m^{3} (91.5 and 95.3 million cu ft) of gas, respectively, purchased by Moldovagaz for the first time at the Romanian Commodities Exchange with money paid in advance by Tiraspoltransgaz.

Tiraspoltransgaz returned to Moldovagaz the first loaned 3 million m^{3} of gas between 26 and 28 February and the remaining 3 million m^{3} between 26 and 31 March.

=== Continued state of emergency ===
With the new more expensive gas purchasing scheme, on 1 March, tariffs for public utilities for consumers in Transnistria increased significantly: 109% for gas, 80% for central heating, 60% for electricity and 25% for water, with sewerage prices also increasing. Prices also increased for businesses. Electricity tariffs increased again slightly in April.

Despite the resumption of gas supplies, Transnistria's state of economic emergency was continually extended on 5 February until 10 March, on 5 March until 9 April, on 9 April until 9 May, on 30 April until 8 June, on 11 June until 30 June, on 9 July until 9 August and on 6 August until 31 August.

== Analysis ==
=== Causes of the crisis ===
According to Moldovan political analyst Andrei Curăraru, the energy crisis was artificial and inevitable, "and an option existed from the start so that Transnistrians would not freeze and we would not have to pay more for electrical energy". The causes for the crisis would have been political: strike Transnistria to extend the effect onto the rest of Moldova through increased energy tariffs to ensure a pro-Russian victory in the upcoming 2025 parliamentary election. American news magazine Foreign Policy and think tanks the Carnegie Endowment for International Peace, the Center for Strategic and International Studies, the Stockholm Centre for Eastern European Studies and the Centre for Eastern Studies attributed the crisis to Russian intentions of undermining the popularity of PAS and producing a pro-Russian victory in the election, and so did Polish Institute of International Affairs analyst Jakub Pieńkowski. The Moldovan authorities also accused Russia of attempting to influence the election, including president Sandu, foreign policy presidential adviser Roșca and national security adviser Stanislav Secrieru.

Curăraru argued that the crisis had generated dissatisfaction among Moldovans with the ruling government and its management, with many associating European integration with a rise in the cost of public services. He also warned that, in an electoral context, people were more vulnerable and could result more inclined to vote from a perspective of economic utilities rather than values, which would be exacerbated by the vote-buying system of Ilan Shor, a pro-Russian Moldovan fugitive oligarch who played a crucial role in Russia's interference tactics in the 2024 Moldovan presidential election and referendum, primarily through disinformation and vote buying. Curăraru further warned that the crisis could be prolonged and revived at any moment; he made this statement in March 2025.

=== Risk of a humanitarian crisis in Transnistria ===
According to Serebrian, the energy crisis caused by the end of Russian gas exports to Transnistria could cause a "much more complicated" situation than that caused by the 2022 Moldovan energy crisis. As he stated, Transnistria's population could face a humanitarian crisis, as it could be left without gas, coal and electricity. On his part, Recean stated that Transnistrians could remain without heat and electricity, which could turn into a humanitarian catastrophe. Some 350,000 people lived in Transnistria as of January 2025; over 90% had Moldovan citizenship as of December 2024.

Ukrainian journalist Serhii Sydorenko argued in an article for European Pravda that the end of free Russian gas supplies to Transnistria would vanish most of Transnistria's revenues and collapse its public budget. Below-market prices for gas, electricity and heating for the population, made possible due to revenues from the use of Russian gas, were the foundation of social security in Transnistria. According to him, the strong reduction in revenue and new costs from the emerging crises would not allow the mitigation of this financial collapse through austerity measures, and a shortage of energy resources such as fuel for heating would aggravate the humanitarian crisis and generate a severe social and economic disaster in the region.

One of the first consequences of such a situation, Sydorenko argued, would be a rapid outflow of people from Transnistria, particularly young and working-age people, that it would not be able to stop by closing its borders, further exacerbating Transnistria's theoretical administrative and budgetary crisis. Moldovan journalist Vitalie Călugăreanu stated in an article for Deutsche Welle that such a wave of internal refugees would significantly affect Moldova economically and politically, in particular in the context of the upcoming parliamentary elections.

=== Potential geopolitical implications ===
According to Sydorenko, the humanitarian crisis that could arise from the end of Russian gas supplies to Transnistria would lead to a rapid collapse of the separatist regime. Transnistria would be forced to negotiate a reintegration back into Moldova, which could happen quickly if the Moldovan authorities showed flexibility. Parlicov expressed similar hopes; in a TV8 programme on 27 November 2024, he stated that the region could be reintegrated by 2026 if Moldova established a good interaction with the Transnistrian authorities.

Sydorenko argued that Moldova would not lack financial and expert assistance from Western partners to tackle the crisis. For the West, the costs would be moderate given the region's small size and population. Furthermore, the West could regard this project as a chance to generate a model of reintegration for the Russian-occupied territories of Georgia and Ukraine. Ukraine's case in particular would pose significantly larger and more complex problems than Transnistria's reintegration, and the West could be interested in using Transnistria as a "testing ground" for its approaches and theories before treating Ukraine's more complex case.

In an article for the Harvard International Review, Lizzie Place noted that the Moldovan government could theoretically cut off all energy payments to Transnistria to put pressure on the region to reintegrate. However, the economic collapse and humanitarian crisis this would pose for its own citizens would make it hesitant to implement such a scenario, she considered. Moldovan scholar Ion Marandici regarded a gradual decrease in energy payments to Transnistria coupled with humanitarian assistance for residents as a more realistic scenario for reintegration. Curăraru argued that increased communication and the extension of compensation and aid programs from the right bank of the Dniester to citizens in Transnistria could lead to a shift in Transnistrian public opinion toward a rapprochement with Moldova. He also stated that the impact of the crisis had discredited the regime in Tiraspol among its own citizens.

=== Russian disinformation ===
As the energy crisis approached, Russian Propagandists and influence agents stepped up accusations against Moldova's leadership, as Moldovan newspaper Ziarul de Gardă reported in a 25 December 2024 article. On 23 December, the Foreign Intelligence Service of Russia (SVR RF) alleged that Sandu had asked for a plan to take the Cuciurgan power station and Transnistria as a whole by force, also alleging there was no guarantee that she would not start a war in the region and that she "is out of her mind". Russian state-owned news agencies RIA Novosti and RT shared on Telegram the information on the SVR RF's report, while Russian state-owned news agency TASS, referencing the report, added on the same platform that the EU did not know how to calm "emotionally unstable" Sandu. As of 25 December, RIA Novosti's publication had garnered over 633,000 views, RT's over 222,000 and TASS' nearly 62,000.

Shor made use of the SVR RF's report, stating that he had already warned multiple times that Moldova was getting into the same "scheme" that had been implemented in Ukraine. He also stated that "Sandu will flee, and ordinary people will suffer" and that "we have to stop her before it is too late". Moldovan PSRM parliament member Bogdan Țîrdea reposted RIA Novosti's publication on his channel Молдавский Vагон (Moldavskiy Vagon, "Moldovan Wagon"), later also publishing the Moldovan authorities' denial of the accusations. Russian State Duma member Aleksey Zhuravlyov declared that Sandu was "emotionally unstable", "completely incapable of negotiating", "incapable of independent thought" and that she "only follows the orders of her Western puppeteers", threatening that Russia would defend Transnistria from a Moldovan attack.

The report, the news agencies' publications and Shor's post were reposted by dozens of pro-Russian Telegram channels, gaining tens of thousands of views. Russian Telegram channel Lomovka accused Sandu of "taking the gas from the people" and wanting to form a military coalition with Western support to "capture" Transnistria, gaining 154,000 views as of 25 December; Политджойстик / Politjoystic threatened "Does Sandu want us to launch missile strikes against decision-making centres in Moldova?", gaining 48,000 views as of the same day; Гражданин (Grazhdanin, "Citizen") alleged that Romania would help Sandu attack Transnistria; and Военная хроника (Voyennaya khronika, "War Chronicle") reported that an attack on Transnistria could seek to disrupt or delay peace negotiations between Ukraine and Russia and accuse Russia of a new aggression. Russian analyst Yuri Baranchik declared in his channel that it would be necessary to take Mykolaiv and Odesa from Ukraine to form a land corridor with Transnistria and "restore justice and legality" in Transnistria and Moldova. He added that an attack against Transnistria guaranteed a Russian invasion and "deprivation of the statehood" of Moldova.

Adrian Băluțel, the chief of staff of Sandu's presidency, denied that Moldova was preparing an attack against Transnistria, calling the accusations a dangerous hoax meant to spread panic. According to the Institute for the Study of War (ISW), the accusations could have represented an attempt to set the ground for a Russian false flag operation in Transnistria. They could have also been aimed at destabilising Moldova to disrupt its accession to the EU, the ISW stated. According to Curăraru, the accusations were part of a destabilization plan and several possible scenarios could have followed them: a Russian-fabricated incident at Cuciurgan to justify an intervention in Transnistria; additional accusations blaming Moldova of sabotaging Transnistria's energy to cause further hostility between the two, diverting attention from Russia's own failures; and an intensification of propaganda against Moldova to radicalize residents in Transnistria, increase tensions and hinder any dialogue process.

== See also ==
- 2022 Moldovan energy crisis
- Russia–Ukraine gas disputes
- 2022–2023 Russia–European Union gas dispute
