= Energy in Moldova =

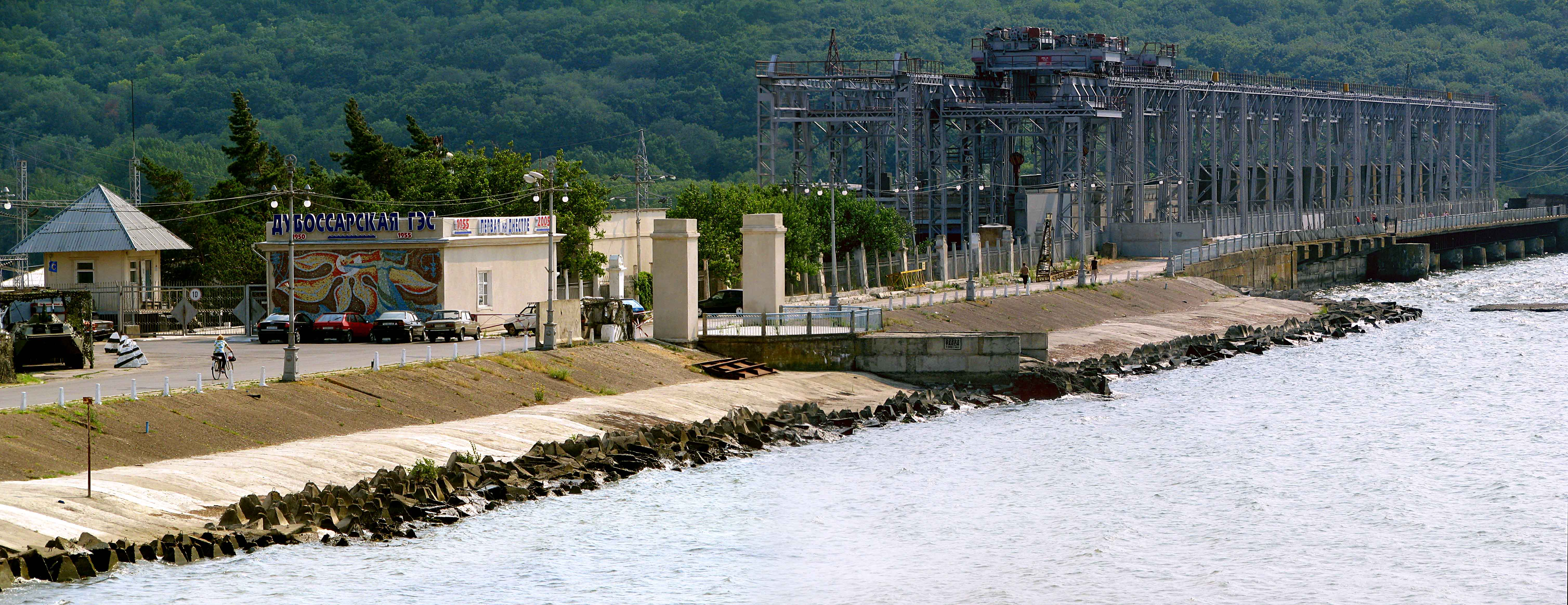
Dubăsari Reservoir

With few natural energy resources, Moldova imports almost all of its energy supplies. Fifty percent of Moldovagaz, the country's national energy company, is owned by Russian oil and natural gas supplier Gazprom, with the remaining 50% split between the Moldovan government (36.6%) and the unrecognised government of Transnistria (13.4%). Moldova's historic dependence on Russian energy is underscored by a debt of more than US$709 million to Gazprom as well as a further US$7 billion by Transnistria. Russia supplies the breakaway pro-Russian region with oil and natural gas without requiring them to pay, with the cost levied as debt against the Moldovan state as a form of economic warfare. The Moldovan government disputes the figures, and has identified more than US$100 million in fraudulent claims by Gazprom.

In August 2013, work began on a pipeline between Moldova and Romania that has now been completed and has broken Russia's monopoly on Moldova's gas supplies. Importing electricity from Romania began in 2022, thereby eliminating the need to buy electricity generated from Russian gas in Transnistria. Improved connectivity will be completed by 2025. As of June 2023, Moldova no longer imports oil or natural gas from Russia and has been granted access to the European Union's joint gas purchasing platform. Financial assistance was provided by the European Union, the World Bank, and the IMF in order to speed up this transition.

Moldova lacks domestic sources of fossil energy and must import substantial amounts of petroleum, coal, natural gas, and other energy resources. The primary energy supply in 2018 was about half natural gas, a quarter oil, and solid biomass at one-fifth.

Renewable energy has expanded rapidly, and Moldova is seeking to diversify its energy sources and cease purchasing from Russia.

== Overview ==
Moldova imports all of its supplies of petroleum, coal, and natural gas; until 2022, imports came largely from Russia.

Moldova was an observer to the treaty establishing the Energy Community from the outset (2006). Following its interest in full membership, the European Commission was mandated to carry out accession negotiations with Moldova in 2007. In December 2009, the Energy Community Ministerial Council decided on the accession, but made it conditional to amendment of Moldova's gas law. Moldova joined the Energy Community as a full-fledged member in March 2010.

Moldova, together with the other contracting parties, has the following tasks and obligations:

1. Extension of the acquis communautaire into their national legislation
2. Establishment of mechanism for network energy markets operations
3. Creation of a single energy market

The Energy Community acquis communautaire consists of roughly 25 legal acts. It includes key EU legal acts in the area of electricity, gas, oil, environment, energy efficiency, renewable energy resources and statistics. The treaty envisages that the main principles of EU competition policy are also applicable. The timeline for transposition and implementation is laid down by the treaty or by a Ministerial Council decision.

Moldova is a partner country of the EU INOGATE energy programme, which has four key topics: enhancing energy security, convergence of member state energy markets on the basis of EU internal energy market principles, supporting sustainable energy development, and attracting investment for energy projects of common and regional interest.

Since the Russian invasion of Ukraine in February 2022, the country has boosted efforts to connect energy systems to the European grid and to discontinue purchases of energy from Russia. The country plans to cease using electricity produced from Russian gas by 2025 by importing electricity from Romania instead.

== JSC Energocom ==
In 2022 Moldova created JSC Energocom, initially just for renewable power supplies, before Russia attacked Ukraine electricity system that resulted in electricity imports from Ukraine being suspended. EBRD provided Energocom with €300m to improve energy security. Energocom has become the central electricity supplier and public electricity trader of Moldova as well as a gas supplier.

=== Gas ===
Moldovagaz, owned 50% by Gazprom, 35.33% by the Government of Moldova and 13.44% is held by the government of Transnistria. The contract between Moldovagaz and Gazprom ended in September 2021, the new contract which increased the price by 500%, will expire in October 2026, to supply 5.7 (million m^{3} per day) mcm/d.

Improvements were made by 2021 in diversification of supply through interconnecting with Romania through the Iași–Chișinău pipeline and the use of gas storage capacities in Ukraine and Romania, improve stability.

In December 2022 Gazprom cut off supplies for three months. Between December 2022 and March 2023, when Gazprom cut off supplies, Energocom provided all gas needed by Moldova. Energocom will be supplying 3.7 mcm/d of gas primarily from Romania and Ukraine.

Moldova ceased buying gas from Russia in May 2023, although Gazprom still supplied Transnistria until 1 January 2025, when Ukraine closed all gas passing through the country.

Romania advised in November 2023 that it was willing to supply gas to Moldova originating in Azerbaijan with whom it had an agreement for 1,000mcm of gas. Energocom is storing 450mcm of gas in Romania ready for winter. Moldova's annual demand is 1,300mcm.

=== Electricity ===
March 2022 saw Moldova interconnecting its national electricity network with that of Romania. It is planned for Romania to provide 30% of the needs of Moldova.

In November 2022 the power station located in Transnistra which produced electricity from Russian gas ceased supplying Moldova with electricity. Electricity was imported from Romania, albeit at a higher cost, helped by a grant from the EU of €200m.

In December 2022 Moldova agreed to continue receiving electricity from the Transnistra power plant at $73 per MWh, later reduced to $66/MWh. Moldova announced in 2023 that it would no longer be buying electricity from the Cuciurgan power station once a high-voltage power line from Romania is installed, scheduled for 2025.

A 60 MWh grid battery started in 2026, connected to a 50 MW solar farm.

== Statistics ==
2020 energy statistics

Production capacities for electricity (billion kWh)
Type	Amount
Fossil fuel	4.87
Hydro	0.02
Biomass	0.01
Wind power	0.01
Solar	0.01
Total	4.92

Electricity (billion kWh)
Category	Amount
Consumption	4.59
Production	4.53
Import	0.62

Natural Gas (billion m^{3})
Consumption	2.80
Production	0.05
Import	2.80

CO_{2} emissions:
8.61 million tons

=== Electricity production ===
2021, million kW*h

Cuciurgan power station	3 445,6
Termoelectrica (Chișinău)	695,4
CET Bălţi	102,3
HPS Costeşti	67,6
Renewable sources	75,5
Other local sources (sugar factory)	2,7
JSC Energocom	0
Total	4 389.1

=== Renewables ===
In 2022 the following renewable power systems were operating, providing 22.3% of Moldovan power needs:

- photovoltaic power plants - 61.6 MW
- wind plants - 115.1 MW
- biomass - 15.3 MW
- hydro - 16.3 MW

=== Planned developments ===
Energocom and Moldovan plans for the future (2023–2030) are based on diversifying and moving away from Russia as a supplier and include:

- New 158 km 400 kV electricity connector between Vulcănești and Chișinău to allow electricity from Romania to Vulcănești to connect to the capital.
- New gas pipeline connector with Romania (the Chișinău Belt).
- Increase renewable energy sources to get electricity from renewables up to 30% by 2030.
- Software to monitor and forecast the production of electricity from renewable sources.
- Look to develop a gas supply from Greece and Bulgaria.

=== Gazprom debt ===
In 1994 energy prices rose and Transnistria stopped paying for the gas it was consuming. Gazprom (Russia) supplied gas to MoldovaGaz, which is 50% owned by Gazprom, which was supplying gas to Moldova and Transnistria. The debt owed to Gazprom has risen from an original $22 million, with $700 million owed in 2022 to Gazprom for gas deliveries made before 2019 of which $300 million are penalties. MoldovaGaz, which is controlled by Gazprom, is accused of spending over EUR 100 million between 2011 and 2021 on dubious “non-compliant” expenses which Moldova should not pay for. The Transnistria debt to Gazprom exceeds USD 9 billion as it has not paid for any gas for over 15 years.

== See also ==
- Cuciurgan power station
- Dubăsari hydroelectric power plant
- Energy Community
- INOGATE
