= Tirotex-Energo power station =

Cogeneration power station in Tiraspol, Moldova

- Country: Moldova
- Location: Tiraspol, Transnistria
- Coordinates: 46°50′58″N 29°40′4″E
- Owner: Sheriff

Thermal power station
- Primary fuel: Natural gas
- Cogeneration?: Yes

External links
- Website: tirotex-energo.com

The Tirotex-Energo power station (Russian: Тиротекс-Энерго) is a power station in Tiraspol, in Moldova's unrecognized breakaway region of Transnistria. It is a cogeneration power plant, meaning it can generate electricity and heat at the same time. It was originally built for the needs of the factory of the textile company Tirotex in Tiraspol, owned by the company Sheriff.

The plant began its industrial production and supply of electrical and thermal energy to consumers on 1 August 2010. It is capable of generating over 250 million kilowatt-hours and over 450,000 gigacalories annually. The station includes a water and sewerage plant, a steam power plant, a compressor station for compressed air production and a section of electrical networks and substations. As of 2012, more than 20 enterprises and organizations in Transnistria were consumers of energy produced by Tirotex-Energo.

Tirotex-Energo is among the major consumers of natural gas in Transnistria, alongside the Moldova Steel Works, the Cuciurgan power station and the Rîbnița Cement Plant, which constitute essential pillars for the Transnistrian economy. Tirotex-Energo is geared toward the needs of its owner Sheriff, and the gas with which it runs is paid to the Transnistrian authorities at dumping prices, reducing production costs and increasing competitiveness. The gas that Transnistrian industries historically operated with was provided by Russia for free. Tirotex-Energo is a contributor to air pollution in Tiraspol.

During the 2025 energy crisis in Transnistria, the Tirotex-Energo power station was one of the three sources of electricity that Transnistria employed, along with the coal-fired unit of Cuciurgan and the Dubăsari Dam. Its putting into operation was among the factors that allowed the reduction of power cuts on 10 January from two separate rotative cuts of four hours each to a single rotative cut of five hours. The station ran on gas reserves and contributed 20 megawatts per day, providing the population with power to heat themselves with their electric appliances.
