= Rîbnița Cement Plant =

Cement plant in Rîbnița, Transnistria (Moldova)

Coordinates: 47°47′5″N 29°1′4″E

CJSC Rîbnița Cement Plant
- Native name: ЗАО «Рыбницкий цементный комбинат» (Russian); SATÎ "Combinatul de ciment din Rîbnița" (Romanian)
- Industry: Building materials
- Founded: 6 November 1961; 63 years ago
- Headquarters: 1 Zaporozhtsa/Zaporojța Street, Rîbnița, Transnistria (Moldova)
- Products: Cement, lime, asbestos shingles
- Number of employees: 650 (2025)

The Rîbnița Cement Plant (Russian: Рыбницкий цементный комбинат, romanized: Rybnitskiy tsementnyy kombinat; Romanian: Combinatul de ciment din Rîbnița) is a cement plant located in the town of Rîbnița, in Moldova's unrecognized breakaway region of Transnistria. It is dedicated to the production and export of cement and lime, and can also produce asbestos shingles. Established on 6 November 1961, the plant boomed during the Soviet era and later faced several highs and lows following Transnistria's de facto independence, with the plant switching ownership multiple times.

The cement plant sells its products domestically but also internationally, majoritarily to Russia, while also owning a prominent share of Moldova's internal cement market. The plant has been indispensable for the construction industry in Transnistria and has had a significant role for its labor market. It is one of the major industries in the separatist state, being among the main contributors to its government budget. It is also the second-largest contributor to Rîbnița's budget behind the Moldova Steel Works, another key industry in Transnistria. As of 2022, the cement plant was the largest polluter in Transnistria.

== History ==
The cement plant in the town of Rîbnița (then in the Soviet Union, now in Moldova's unrecognized breakaway region of Transnistria) was established in 1961, when the first production line was put into operation on 6 November. It thus became the first cement plant in Moldova. The construction of the plant had begun in 1958, and two more production lines were opened in October 1962 and early 1970. The plant boomed in the 1970s and 1980s with its reconstruction, reaching an annual production of 1.24 million tons of cement and 948,000 tons of clinker. Thanks to the activity of the Rîbnița cement plant, industrial giants in Transnistria such as the Moldova Steel Works, Moldavizolit and Moldavkabel began to grow, as stated by Transnistria's First Deputy Minister of Industry Yuri Ganin in 2006. Ganin further stated that "in Transnistria, probably, there is no home or enterprise, highway or store, built during the Soviet era, where Rîbnița cement was not used". In 1993, the plant's cement was awarded the Arch of Europe Golden Star award in Madrid, Spain, and its SV-40/150 asbestos shingles were awarded the highest quality category when tested by the meteorological service in Debrecen, Hungary.

The plant went through difficult moments in 2002 and 2003, and in September 2004, the stake of shares in the plant owned by the Transnistrian breakaway state was sold to the Hungarian construction company Tegep for the symbolic price of one Transnistrian ruble with a mandatory investment program of 1.4 million dollars. With its privatization and the introduction of a trustee in bankruptcy, the situation of the plant improved; having been sold to Tegep with a debt burden of 8 million dollars, the company managed to pay off all the historical debt as well as the accounts payable and accounts receivable. Russian mining and metallurgy company Metalloinvest gained hold of the company in 2007, with Metalloinvest owning the majority stake of Rîbnița's cement plant but also of its metallurgical plant (Moldova Steel Works) as of 2013. As of that year, Russian Uzbek oligarch Alisher Usmanov owned both. He handed both companies over to the Transnistrian state in 2015, reasoning that they were not profitable, and the majority stake in the cement plant was transferred to local entrepreneurs Piotr and Oleg Babii, father and son respectively, who had recently been general manager and commercial director of the plant respectively.

In 2013, both the cement and metallurgy plants in Rîbnița faced problems due to the slowdown of the construction market amid the global economic situation and rises in the price of natural gas. An increase in gas prices for businesses in January that year proposed by then de facto President of Transnistria Yevgeny Shevchuk led to a complete halt on production and exports by both plants. They consequently also stopped paying taxes, even though they had provided 15–20% of their revenue to the government budget of Transnistria up until that point. Total economic losses reached around tens of millions of dollars every month. In May 2019, Ukraine introduced anti-dumping duties on cement imports from Moldova (a 95% duty precisely), as well as from Belarus (57%) and Russia (115%), until mid-2024. This included the Rîbnița cement plant, with its use of free Russian gas for production and subsequent dumping as the justification for the duties. Moldova had represented almost 40% of Ukrainian cement imports in 2018, with secretary of state of Moldova's Ministry of Economic Development and Digitalization Vadim Gumene asking for the lifting of the duties in late September 2023.

In 2022, from late October to early December, the cement and metallurgical plants of Rîbnița ceased their activities due to a reduction in gas volumes supplied to Moldova by the Russian energy company Gazprom, which triggered an energy crisis in the country. The cement plant closed again on 11 January 2025 amid a new energy crisis due to a total stop of gas supplies to Transnistria. Half of the plant's 650 workers at that time were sent home, while the other half remained to clean equipment and carry out repairs for when gas supplies would be resumed. Rîbnița's metallurgical plant was also closed during the crisis, with Transnistrian local media reporting that the Transnistrian budget would be affected without the activity of the two. In March, both the cement and metallurgical plants resumed operations, according to reports from several civilians and civil and political figures in Moldova. On 16 May, de facto Transnistrian president Vadim Krasnoselsky signed a law that put 25% of the plant's shares, valued at 32.5 million Transnistrian rubles or some 2 million dollars, up for privatization in the context of financial difficulties for the de facto government following the energy crisis.

== Production and activities ==
The Rîbnița cement plant is located in the industrial zone on the outskirts of Rîbnița, on 1 Zaporozhtsa/Zaporojța Street. The plant is dedicated to the production and export, in containers or bags, of bulk cement, producing types PC 500 DO and PC 400 D20. It also produces and exports lime and is capable of producing roof shingles of asbestos cement. The plant's products are sold both domestically and internationally, with the majority of its products being exported to Russia. It can only export products outside Transnistria under a "Made in Moldova" country of origin label due to Transnistria's international unrecognized status. The plant was built with a designed capacity of 1.25 million tons of cement. It has traditionally held 40% of the share of the cement market in Moldova, with the remainder belonging to the Lafarge plant in Rezina in government-held Moldova, as then general manager of the Rîbnița plant Vadim Scorobogatco stated in 2015.

The Rîbnița cement plant was featured among the 50 largest exporters in Moldova in the period from 2005 to 2007 along with two other companies hosted in Transnistria, namely Tirotex and Rîbnița's metallurgical plant; the latter was in fact the largest exporter in Moldova in that period. In 2006, cement and lime production increased by 41% and 6% respectively compared to the previous year. In 2008, before the financial crisis, the plant produced over one million tons of cement, 90% of which was exported to Russia. That year, in the last three months, the average monthly indicators of output and sales fell by 59.9% and 56.8% respectively compared to the average monthly indicators for the first nine months of the year.

In subsequent years, production declined significantly, to 494,200 tons of cement in 2014. That year, the plant paid almost 65 million Transnistrian rubles (about 5.8 million dollars) in taxes, placing it eighth among the largest taxpayers in the unrecognized state. As of 2015, a single furnace at the plant consumed between 4.5 and 5 million cubic metres (160 and 180 million cubic feet) of gas monthly, although measures were being taken at the time to reduce gas consumption for production. That year, Piotr and Oleg Babii reported that they were negotiating fees with Moldovan railway operator Calea Ferată din Moldova for the transport of the plant's products, aiming to increase sales in the Romanian market. A 2025 article published by major Romanian newspaper Libertatea argued that Oleg Babii had developed a network of companies in Romania to support the cement and metallurgical plants in Rîbnița, providing the separatist regime in Tiraspol with foreign currency.

== Relevance and impact in Transnistria ==
According to Polish Centre for Eastern Studies political analyst Kamil Całus, as of 2013, the Rîbnița Cement Plant was among four giant industrial plants on which Transnistria's economy was based, the others being the Moldova Steel Works, the Cuciurgan power station and the textile company Tirotex, the latter's majority stakeholder being Sheriff. In a 2025 article for Ziarul de Gardă, Moldovan journalist Natalia Zaharescu defined the cement and metallurgical plants in Rîbnița as the main contributors to the economy of the separatist region. Furthermore, the cement plant was also the second-largest contributor to the budget of the town of Rîbnița as of 2006, being only behind the metallurgical plant.

The cement plant has been greatly important for Transnistria's construction industry and labor market. Vadim Lozovsky, then chairman of the Council of People's Deputies of Rîbnița District and of the town of Rîbnița, stated in 2022 that "It is difficult to find a family in Rîbnița where someone has not worked at the plant at some point. And if they have not, they will." For his part, Viktor Tyagay, then Rîbnița District head and Rîbnița mayor, stated that, without the plant's cement, "not a single renovation or construction project that is being implemented in the town could be carried out". Workers in factories in Transnistria, including Rîbnița's cement and metallurgical plants, are exposed to Transnistrian state symbols in the factories' facilities. This is one of several ways by the de facto government to build loyalty for the unrecognized state among factory workers, an important social stratum in Transnistria, according to American professor Rebecca Chamberlain-Creangă.

The plant is among the main polluters of air and of the Dniester river in Transnistria. As of 2010, cement production at the plant released a significant amount of fine dust into the atmosphere and the plant's work area. That year, Ukrainian researchers O. N. Sydorchuk and A. P. Martynenko stated that the plant generated 1856.43422 tons of pollutants per year. In 2022, Moldova's Minister of Environment Rodica Iordanov stated that the cement plant in Rîbnița was the largest source of pollution in Transnistria. According to her, the plant, which had no permissive act issued by Moldova, lacked any filters to ensure the mitigation of harmful emissions, and the plant's management had refused any dialogue with the Moldovan authorities and was acting contrary to European environmental requirements. Furthermore, in 2003, 928 tons of highly toxic acid tars produced at the Rîbnița metallurgical plant were imported for storage at the cement plant under the guise of being alternative fuel.
