= 2022 Moldovan energy crisis =

In late 2022, Moldova suffered an energy crisis, the worst since its independence. It was provoked by the reduction of gas supplies to Moldova by Russia's Gazprom. The energy crisis took place in the context of the Russian invasion of Ukraine.

The initial 30% drop in gas supply from Russia led Transnistria to reduce the electricity supply to Moldova by 73%, Moldova also lost their supply of electricity from Ukraine due to Russian attacks on power systems. Financial help from the European Union, goodwill from Romania especially and decisive action by Moldova, solved the immediate crisis even after Russia reduced the gas supply to Moldova. The Russian action resulted in the Moldovan government deciding the time had come to sever all connections to Russian energy sources and establish alternative supplies.

== Cause ==
In October 2022, the Russian state-owned company Gazprom announced it would reduce its gas deliveries to Moldova by 30%, including Transnistria, an unrecognized separatist state supported by Russia and internationally recognized as part of Moldova. This caused a heavy gas deficit in Transnistria that caused several large companies in the separatist republic to cease their activities. In addition, the Transnistrian authorities announced that due to this gas crisis, the Cuciurgan power station, which supplies 70% of government-held Moldova's energy needs, would reduce its power deliveries to 27% of normal.

In early October, Ukraine ceased its electricity exports to Moldova following the destruction of part of Ukraine's electricity system as a result of a mass bombing campaign of Ukrainian civilian and energy infrastructure by Russia. On 24 October, this provoked an electricity deficit in the country.

There were a few times when parts of Moldova were in blackout due to Russian shelling of critical infrastructure of Ukraine.

Protests against the pro-European government led by President Maia Sandu erupted seeking rapprochement with Russia in order to negotiate a better energy deal. Due to this, it has been hypothesised that Russia is using Moldova's energy crisis to serve its geopolitical interests and to destabilize the pro-Western government in power.

== Alternative energy sources ==
Following this, the Romanian state-owned company Hidroelectrica signed a contract with Moldovan state-owned Energocom company for the delivery of electricity to Moldova at prices considerably lower than the spot market price in Romania. For this to take place, changes in Romanian legislation were required. This is believed to have increased support among Moldovan society for a potential unification of Moldova and Romania.

On 10 November, during a visit by the President of the European Commission Ursula von der Leyen to Moldova, a 250 million-euro financial package from the European Union (EU) was announced to help Moldova deal with its energy crisis. Of these, 100 million would be grants, other 100 million would be loans and another 50 million would be destined to help Moldova's most vulnerable citizens.

On 16 February 2023, following the restructuring of the Ministry of Infrastructure and Regional Development during the establishment of the Recean Cabinet, the Ministry of Energy of Moldova was created, with Victor Parlicov as energy minister.

Between December 2022 and March 2023, Energocom provided all gas needed by Moldova. The transport of gas from the European market to overcome the energy crisis was possible through the Iași–Chișinău pipeline.

== See also ==
- 2025 Moldovan energy crisis
- Economic impact of the 2022 Russian invasion of Ukraine
- Moldova–Russia relations
- Transnistria conflict
