= Dorin Junghietu =

Moldovan energy expert and politician

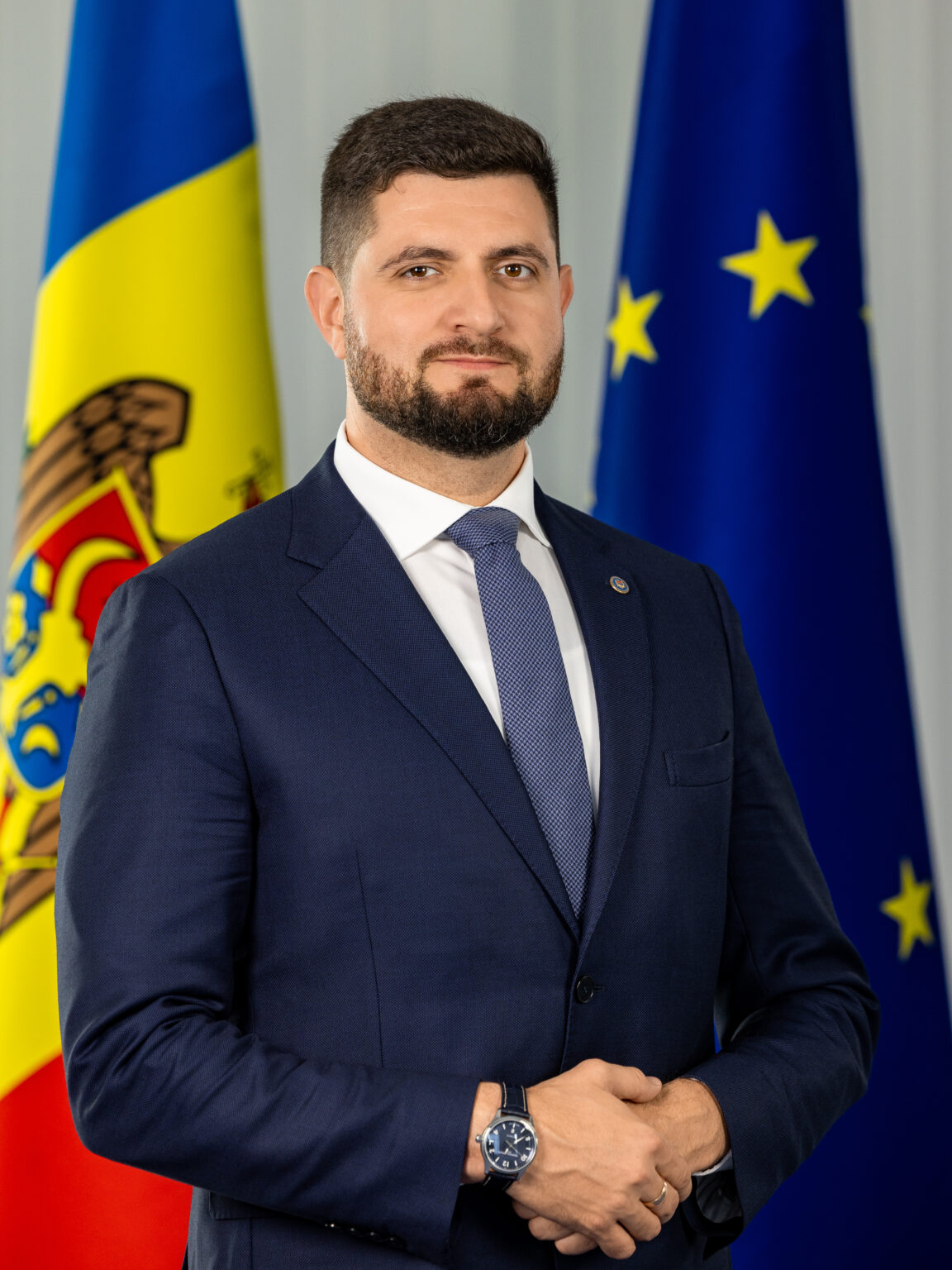
- Official portrait, 2025

Minister of Energy
- Incumbent
- Assumed office 19 February 2025
- President: Maia Sandu
- Prime Minister: Dorin Recean; Alexandru Munteanu; Eugen Osmochescu (acting); Vasile Tofan
- Preceded by: Victor Parlicov

Personal details
- Born: 10 August 1986 (age 39)
- Education: Petroleum-Gas University of Ploiești; University of Aberdeen

Dorin Junghietu (born 10 August 1986) is a Moldovan energy expert and politician currently serving as Moldova's Minister of Energy. He was appointed to the position on 19 February 2025. At the time, Junghietu had over 16 years of international professional experience in the coordination and implementation of major energy projects according to the Moldovan government.

Junghietu worked at a subsidiary in Kazakhstan of the Italian company Sicim, at the Australian company Worley, at the Saudi company Saudi Aramco and at the Petrotel Lukoil Refinery in Romania. He studied a bachelor's and master's degree in Exact Sciences and Chemical Engineering at the Petroleum-Gas University of Ploiești in Romania and later a master's degree in Political Sciences and Conflict Management at the University of Aberdeen in the United Kingdom.
