= Dima Kash =

Russian singer-songwriter (born 1989)

- Birth name: Dima Kash
- Born: November 18, 1989 (age 35) Rîbnița, Moldova, USSR
- Origin: Minneapolis, Minnesota
- Genres: Hip hop, RnB
- Occupation: Hip hop artist-songwriter
- Years active: 2013–present
- Website: dimakashmusic.com

Dima Kash (born November 18, 1989) is a Soviet-born singer-songwriter and rapper of Russian parentage based in Twin Cities, Minnesota.

== Career ==
Kash was born on November 18, 1989, in Rîbnița, Moldova, to Russian parents who migrated to the United States as a war refugee from the USSR. He attended Burnsville High School in Burnsville, MN but dropped out at the age of 16. Later, he joined army where he was discharged on medical grounds after sustaining injuries to his back.

Dima Kash started recording music at the age of 17 at his own recording studio. In 2013, he released his first album Vibe with me. He has worked and toured to many parts of the United States with Grammy Award winner Layzie Bone from Bone Thugs-n-Harmony. In 2014, he collaborated with Royce Rizzy and toured in Japan. Dima Kash has also performed on a showcase at the SXSW Music Festival in Austin, Texas, in 2015 alongside Twista, Crucial Conflict, Lil Durk, Dreezy, Murphy Lee and many others.

In 2015, Dima Kash collaborated with Mod Sun and released his second album Kash Over Everything. The song from the album Can't Breathe was listed in Spotify's Viral Global 50 Charts alongside artists like Drake, Rihanna and Adele. The song was also listed at No. 27 on US chart and No. 47 on UK chart. Dima Kash has worked with numerous artists including 2 Chainz, T.I., Lil Boosie, G-Eazy, MGK, Kid Ink, Bone Thugs N Harmony and Twista. He was awarded with the Rap Artist of the Year award at 2016 TCUMA awards.
