= Iași–Chișinău pipeline =

Natural gas pipeline in Romania and Moldova

Location
- Country: Romania and Moldova
- Direction: West–east
- Start: Iași, Romania
- Passes through: Romania and Moldova
- To: Chișinău, Moldova

General information
- Type: Natural gas

Technical information
- Length: 150 km (93 mi)
- Maximum discharge: 1,850,000,000 cubic metres (6.5×10^{10} cubic feet) per year

The Iași–Chișinău pipeline, also known as the Iași–Ungheni–Chișinău pipeline, is a natural gas pipeline going from Iași in Romania to Chișinău in Moldova. The pipeline was inaugurated in 2014 and connected Iași with the Moldovan town of Ungheni. It was extended to the capital Chișinău in 2019, with the compressor stations being put into operation in 2021. However, it was not used until the 2022 Moldovan energy crisis.

The pipeline is 150 kilometres (93 miles) long and has a capacity of 5,076,000 cubic metres (179,300,000 cubic feet) of gas per day, or about 1,850,000,000 m^{3} (6.5×10^{10} cu ft) per year. It cost Romania's Transgaz state-owned company about 150 million euros. It supplies gas from Romania to Moldova through a reverse flow of the Trans-Balkan pipeline.

In 2024, then Minister of Energy of Moldova, Victor Parlicov, stated that the pipeline was a real lifesaver for Moldova's energy security during the energy crisis in 2022, when Russia's Gazprom unilaterally reduced the volume of gas delivered to Moldova. The pipeline permitted Moldova to obtain gas from the European market, allowing it to overcome the crisis. As of late 2023, Moldova no longer imported gas from Russia.
