= Ion Leșanu =

Moldovan politician and diplomat (born 1945)

1st Minister of Industry and Energy
- In office 21 December 1999 – 27 July 2001
- President: Petru Lucinschi; Vladimir Voronin
- Prime Minister: Dumitru Braghiș; Vasile Tarlev
- Succeeded by: Iacov Timciuc

Moldovan Ambassador to Belarus, Latvia, Lithuania and Estonia
- In office 8 December 1994 – 10 August 1998
- President: Mircea Snegur; Petru Lucinschi
- Prime Minister: Andrei Sangheli; Ion Ciubuc
- Succeeded by: Nicolae Cernomaz

Personal details
- Born: 1 October 1945 (age 80)

Ion Leșanu (born 1 October 1945) is a Moldovan politician and diplomat. He served as the Minister of Energy of Moldova from 1999 to 2001.
