= Rîbnița =

Rîbnița Rybnitsa
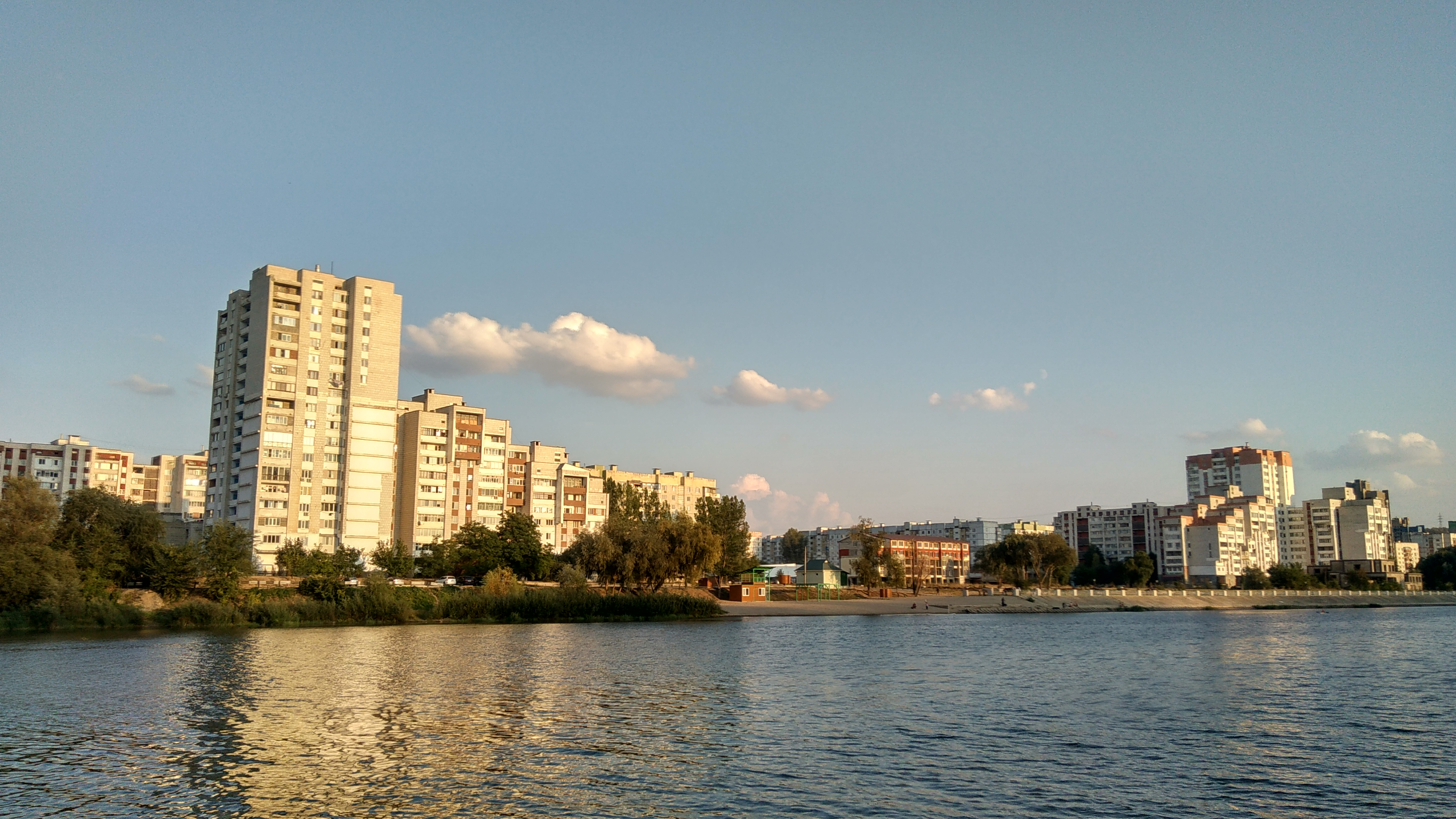
- Rîbnița's skyline as view from over the Dniester river

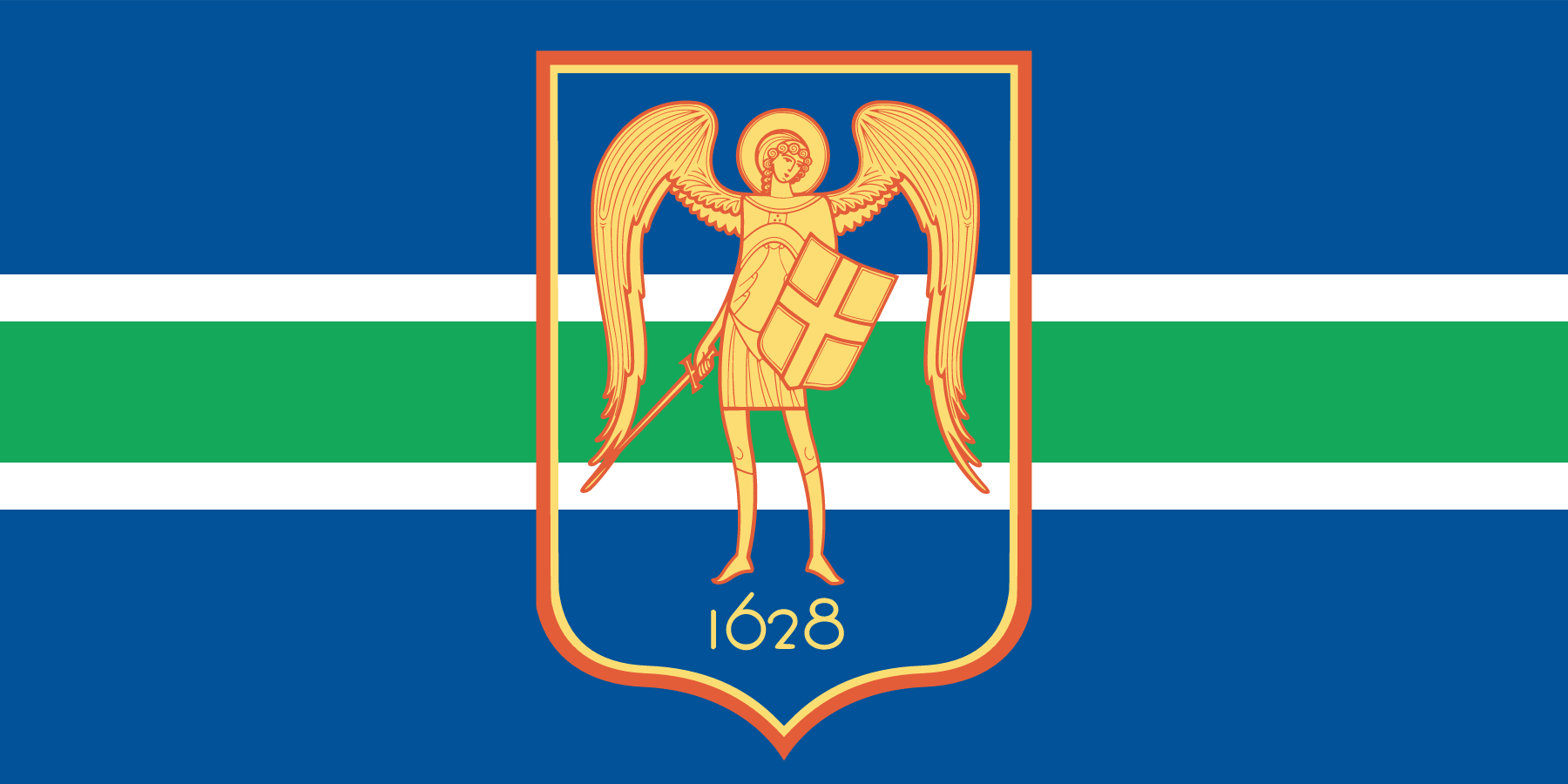
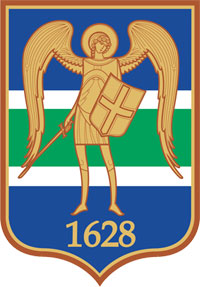
- Flag Seal
- Anthem: "Hymn of Rîbnița"
- Location of Rîbnița in Transnistria Location of Rîbnița in Moldova
- Coordinates: 47°45′55″N 29°00′28″E
- Country (de jure): Moldova
- Country (de facto): Transnistria (Note: Transnistria's political status is disputed. It considers itself to be an independent state, but this is not recognised by any UN member state. The Moldovan government and the international community consider Transnistria a part of Moldova's territory.)
- Founded: 1628

Government
  - Head of the State Administration of the Rybnitsa Raion and the Rybnitsa City: Viktor Tyagay

Population (2014)
  - Total: 47,949
- Time zone: UTC+2 (EET)
- Climate: Dfa
- Website: rybnitsa.org

Rîbnița (Romanian: Rîbnița, Râbnița, Rîmnița or Râmnița, Moldovan Cyrillic: Рыбница, pronounced [ˈrɨbnitsa]) or Rybnitsa (Russian: Ры́бница, romanized: Rýbnitsa; Ukrainian: Ри́бниця, romanized: Rýbnytsia) is a town in the breakaway Moldovan region of Transnistria. According to the 2004 census, it has a population of 53,648. Rîbnița is situated in the northern half of Transnistria, on the left bank of the Dniester, and is separated from the river by a concrete dam. The town is the seat of the Rîbnița District.

== History ==
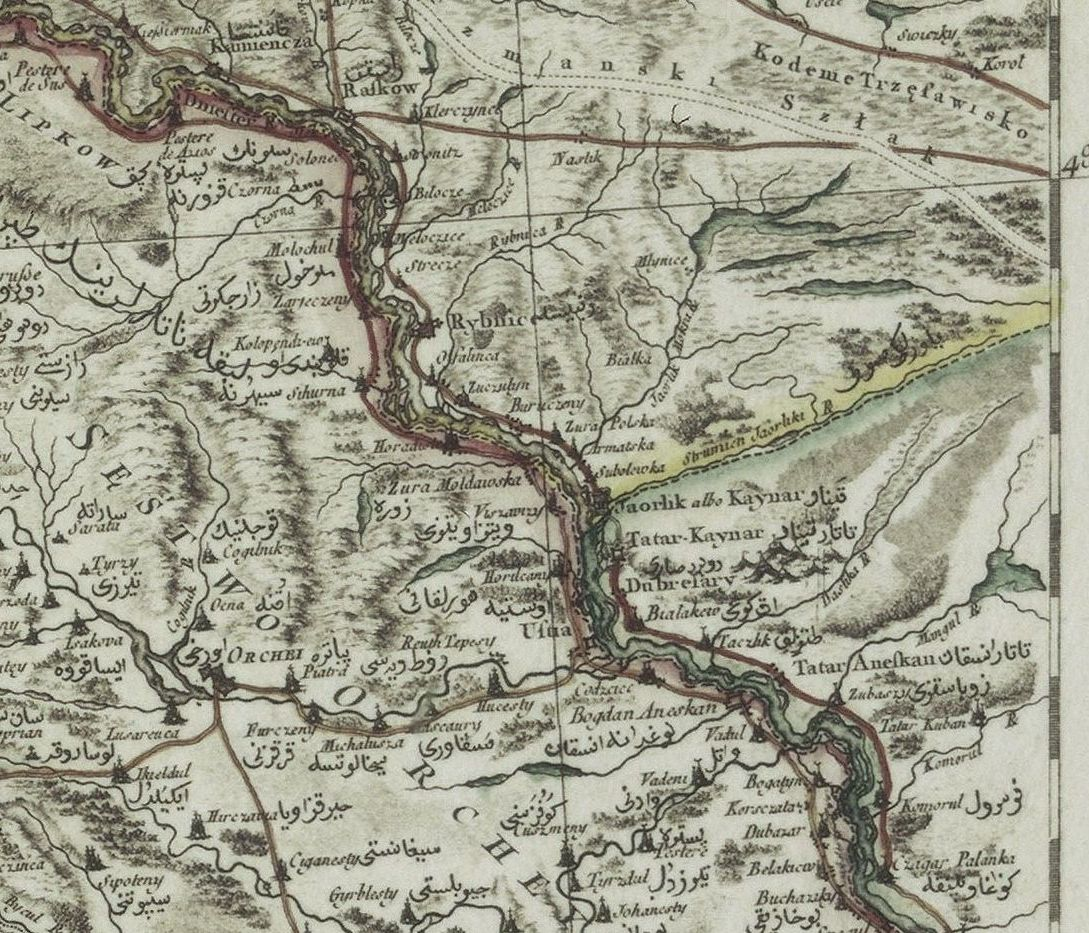
Fragment of a map of Poland from 1772 with Rybnica marked

Rîbnița was founded in 1628 as the Ruthenian village Rybnytsia, its name meaning "fishery" (from рꙑба, "fish"). As early as 1657, Rîbnița was mentioned in documents as an important town. Rybnica, as it was known in Polish, was a private town of the Koniecpolski, Lubomirski, Kożuchowski noble families, administratively located in the Bracław County in the Bracław Voivodeship in the Lesser Poland Province of the Kingdom of Poland. In 1672 it fell to the Ottoman Empire, but was regained by Poland in 1699. Strong Western European influences can be seen in this formerly Polish town. Following the Second Partition of Poland, in 1793, Rîbnița passed from Poland to Russia. In 1802 the Saint Michael church was built, and in 1817 the Saint Joseph church was built.

After the fall of Tsarist Russia, it became part of the newly formed Ukrainian People's Republic in 1917, then fell to Soviet Ukraine in 1919, and eventually became part of the Moldavian Autonomous Oblast in 1924, which was soon converted into the Moldavian Autonomous Soviet Socialist Republic, and the Moldavian Soviet Socialist Republic in 1940 during World War II. In August 1941 the town was occupied by German and Romanian armies, but soon afterwards transferred to a Romanian civilian administration as part of the Transnistria Governorate. The town served as transit point for around 25,000 Jews deported from Bessarabia during the Holocaust. In late August the Romanian authorities created a ghetto with a population of around 3,000, however by December more than half had died due to hunger, disease and cold. Leaving the ghetto without permission was strictly forbidden, with 48 Jews being executed on April 4, 1942 for being found outside the ghetto. On 19 March 1944, the Rîbnița massacre took place, in which about 200 detainees held at a penitentiary in the city were shot by German soldiers, with only a few people surviving.

== Economy ==
Rîbnița is home to Transnistria's largest company, Moldova Steel Works, a steel plant which produces more than $500 million worth of exports a year and traditionally has accounted for between 40% and 50% of Transnistria's GDP. Other industries are also present in Rîbnița, including the Rîbnița Cement Plant, the oldest sugar plant in Transnistria (founded in 1898) and an alcohol distillery. The city has a large railway station and a river port, as well as a supermarket owned by Sheriff.

== People and culture ==
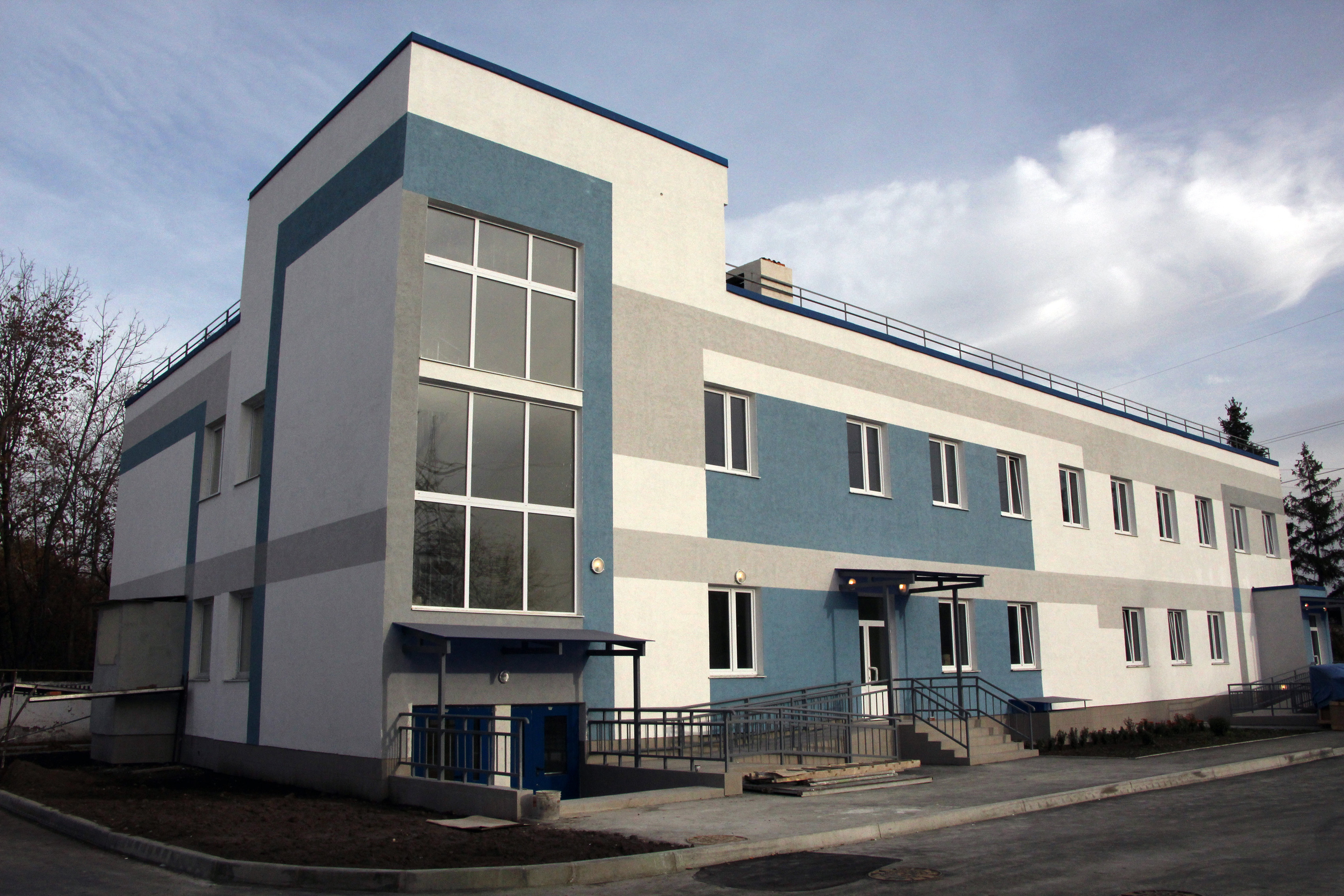
District hospital

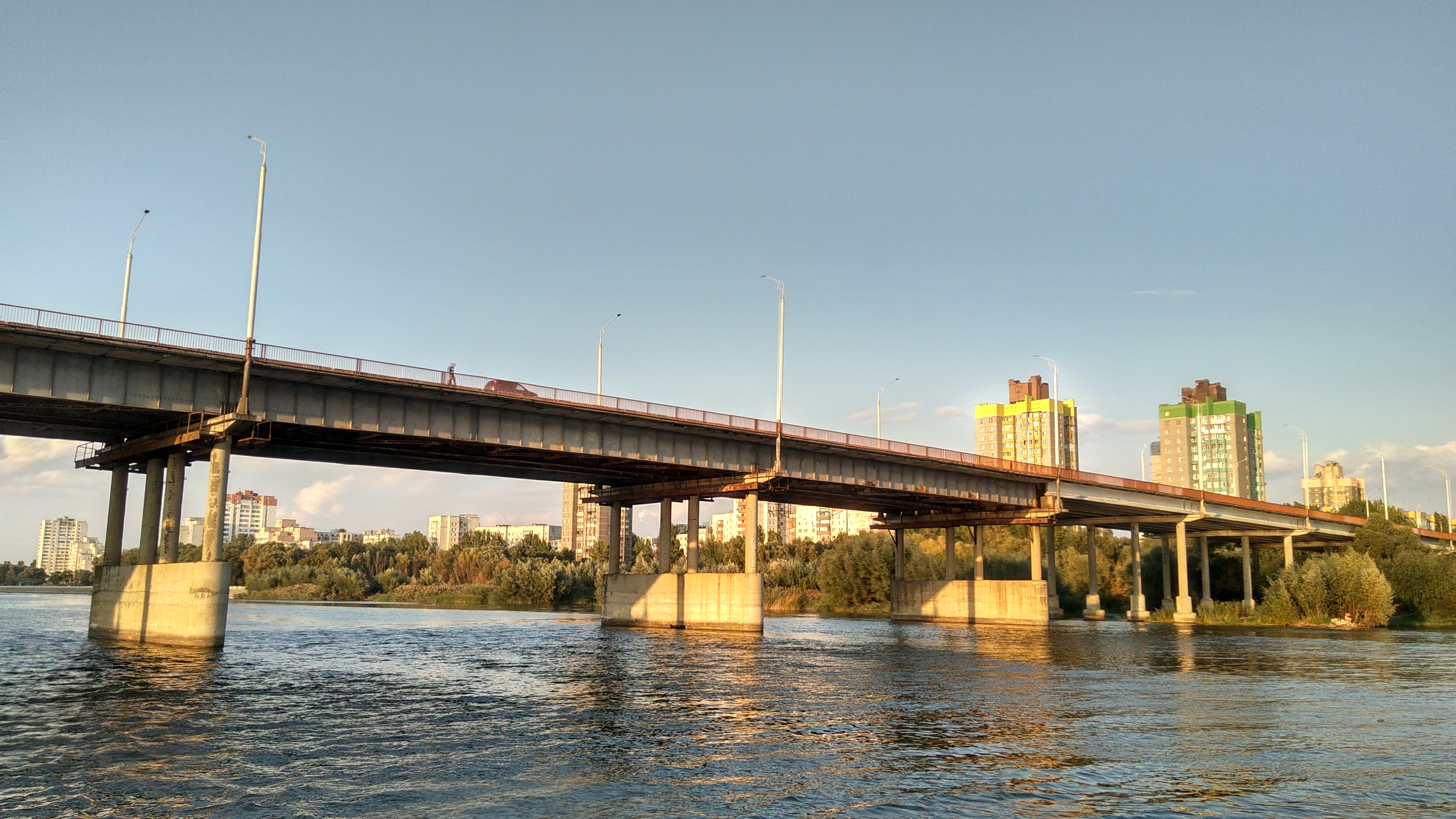
Road bridge between Rîbnița and Rezina

Central Rîbnița has tall buildings and an active city life. There is a popular park near the town reservoir, and many historical and architectural monuments in the town and its surrounding areas. The main street in the town is Victory Street.

== Demographics ==
In 1970, Rîbnița had a population of 32,400 people; in 1989 it had increased to 61,352. According to the 2004 Census in Transnistria, the city had 53,648 inhabitants, including 11,235 Moldovans (20.94%), 24,898 Ukrainians (46.41%), 11,738 Russians (21.88%), 480 Poles (0.89%), 328 Belarusians, 220 Bulgarians, 166 Jews, 106 Germans, 96 Gagauzians, 71 Armenians, 38 Roma, and 4245 others and non-declared.

== Religion ==
Rîbnița has three places of worship located right next to each other; a Catholic church, an Orthodox church, and a synagogue.

== Sport ==
FC Iskra-Stal Rîbnița is the city's professional football club, playing in the top Moldovan football league, the Divizia Națională.

== Climate ==
Climate data for Rîbnița (1991–2020, extremes 1963–2021)
Month	Jan	Feb	Mar	Apr	May	Jun	Jul	Aug	Sep	Oct	Nov	Dec	Year
Record high °C (°F)	14.1 (57.4)	20.3 (68.5)	24.6 (76.3)	31.5 (88.7)	35.5 (95.9)	38.4 (101.1)	39.6 (103.3)	40.0 (104.0)	37.7 (99.9)	32.0 (89.6)	25.0 (77.0)	18.2 (64.8)	40.0 (104.0)
Mean daily maximum °C (°F)	0.7 (33.3)	3.0 (37.4)	9.2 (48.6)	17.0 (62.6)	22.9 (73.2)	26.5 (79.7)	28.7 (83.7)	28.5 (83.3)	22.5 (72.5)	15.4 (59.7)	7.9 (46.2)	2.2 (36.0)	15.4 (59.7)
Daily mean °C (°F)	−2.4 (27.7)	−0.8 (30.6)	3.9 (39.0)	10.6 (51.1)	16.3 (61.3)	20.2 (68.4)	22.2 (72.0)	21.6 (70.9)	16.0 (60.8)	9.8 (49.6)	4.2 (39.6)	−0.8 (30.6)	10.1 (50.2)
Mean daily minimum °C (°F)	−5.2 (22.6)	−4.0 (24.8)	−0.4 (31.3)	4.6 (40.3)	9.8 (49.6)	13.9 (57.0)	15.8 (60.4)	14.8 (58.6)	10.1 (50.2)	5.0 (41.0)	1.2 (34.2)	−3.4 (25.9)	5.2 (41.4)
Record low °C (°F)	−30.7 (−23.3)	−26.6 (−15.9)	−19.9 (−3.8)	−8.3 (17.1)	−2.6 (27.3)	2.9 (37.2)	6.5 (43.7)	3.4 (38.1)	−5.5 (22.1)	−9.5 (14.9)	−16.7 (1.9)	−25.7 (−14.3)	−30.7 (−23.3)
Average precipitation mm (inches)	33 (1.3)	27 (1.1)	28 (1.1)	37 (1.5)	50 (2.0)	70 (2.8)	72 (2.8)	50 (2.0)	53 (2.1)	37 (1.5)	41 (1.6)	31 (1.2)	530 (20.9)
Average precipitation days (≥ 1.0 mm)	6	5	6	6	7	7	7	5	5	5	5	6	72
Average relative humidity (%)	83	81	77	66	63	67	68	66	69	75	82	85	74
Mean monthly sunshine hours	53	72	137	194	275	298	317	298	202	135	64	46	2,091
Source 1: NOAA
Source 2: Serviciul Hidrometeorologic de Stat (extremes, relative humidity)

== Notable people ==
- Meir Argov (1905–1963), Zionist activist and Israeli politician
- Oleg Babenco (born 1968), Moldovan politician and professor
- DoReDoS, Moldovan musical trio composed of Marina Djundyet, Eugeniu Andrianov and Sergiu Mîța
- Oleg Hromțov (born 1983), Moldovan footballer
- Dima Kash (born 1989), Russian-American singer, songwriter and rapper
- Olena Lukash (born 1976), Ukrainian jurist and politician
- Boris Mints (born 1958), Russian oligarch
- Artiom Rozgoniuc (born 1995), Moldovan footballer
- Yevgeny Shevchuk (born 1968), Transnistrian politician and second president of Transnistria
- Yitzhak Yitzhaky (1902–1955), Israeli politician

== International relations ==
=== Twin towns — Sister cities ===
Rîbnița is twinned with:

- Dmitrov, Russia
- Hola Prystan, Ukraine
- Vinnytsia, Ukraine

The city also has a "regional friendship" (a less formal version of a sister city) with:

- Lakeland, Florida, United States
