= Petroleum-Gas University of Ploiești =

University in Romania

Petroleum-Gas University of Ploiești, Romania
- Former names: Petroleum and Gas Institute, University of Ploiești
- Type: Public
- Established: 1948
- Rector: Conf. dr. ing. Alin Diniță
- Academic staff: 318
- Students: 8,600 (2012–2013)
- Location: Ploiești, Romania
- Campus: Urban
- Colors: Blue/Yellow
- Website: www.upg-ploiesti.ro

Petroleum-Gas University of Ploiești (Universitatea Petrol-Gaze, UPG) is a public university in Ploiești, Romania. Founded in 1948 under the name of Institute of Petroleum and Gas, in response to the increasing industrialization in Romania and the lack of high level education in the petroleum and gas fields, it gained fast the status of university, hence changing its name to the actual one in 1993 and extending with new faculties and departments in the field of economic sciences and humanities.

The UPG's academic structure includes 5 faculties: Faculty of Petroleum and Gas Engineering, Faculty of Mechanical and Electrical Engineering, Faculty of Petroleum Technology and Petrochemistry, Faculty of Economic Sciences and Faculty of Letters and Sciences.
