= Tirotex =

Transnistrian textile company

Tirotex (Russian: Тиротекс) is a textile company based in Transnistria producing clothing and other textile products. It is located in (and gets its name from) Tiraspol. The company was established in 1972 with the construction of its factory, which took a decade to complete.

The company is the largest textile enterprise in the southwestern Commonwealth of Independent States and also claims to be the second largest of its kind in all of Europe. Within its complex, there are weaving, sewing, finishing and spinning operations. As an export-orientated company, 70% of its products are shipped abroad.

The Tirotex-Energo power station was originally built for the needs of the Tirotex factory.

== Products ==
The products of SA Tirotex are exported to Austria, Germany, Greece, Italy, the Netherlands, Sweden, Switzerland, Portugal, Romania, Poland, and the United States. They appear in a number of catalogs and retail outlets, such as Quelle, Aldi, Jotex and Hemtex.

The company produces mainly upmarket fashion items including women's clothing, tablecloths and bedsheets. It also manufactures suits, surgical gowns and uniforms. Only cotton fabric is used at the facilities.
