= Ministry of Energy (Moldova) =

Government ministry of Moldova

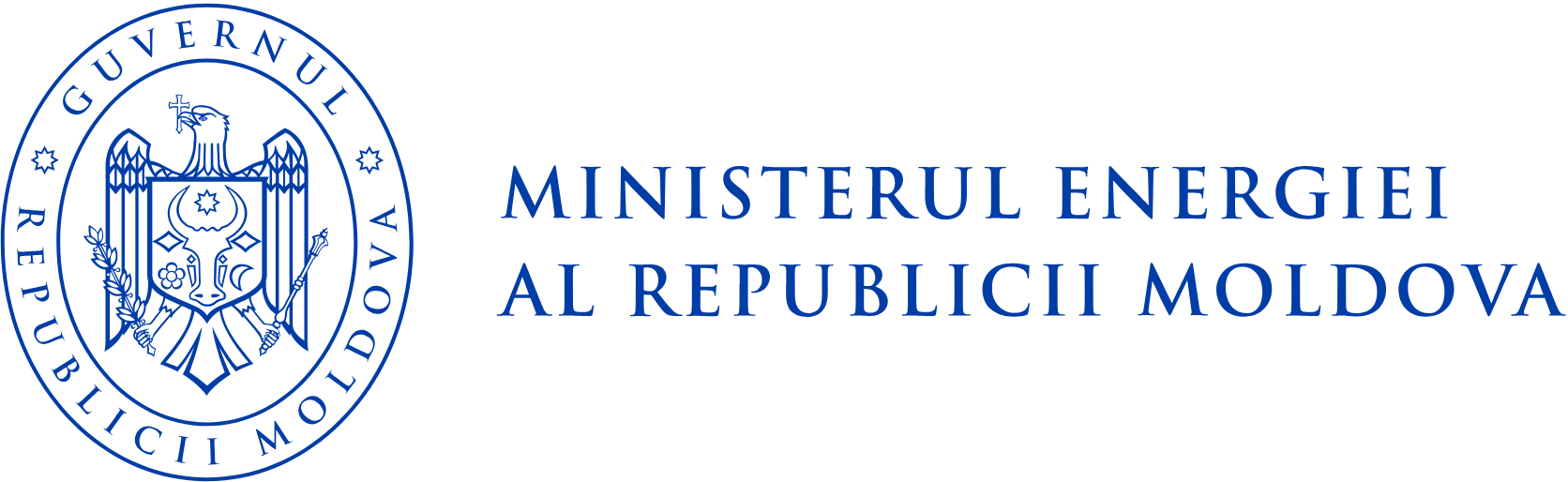

Ministry overview
- Formed: 21 December 1999; 26 years ago
- Jurisdiction: Government of Moldova
- Headquarters: 134 Stephen the Great Boulevard, Chișinău
- Minister responsible: Dorin Junghietu, Minister of Energy
- Ministry executives: Andrei Grițco, Secretary General; Carolina Novac, Secretary of State; Vitalie Mîța, Secretary of State
- Website: energie.gov.md

The Ministry of Energy (Romanian: Ministerul Energiei) is one of the fourteen ministries of the Government of Moldova. The ministry was established on 16 February 2023 following the restructuring of the Ministry of Infrastructure and Regional Development. Currently, the Moldovan minister of energy is Dorin Recean. The Ministry of Energy aims for the energy independence of Moldova. It was created following a heavy energy crisis in the country.

== List of ministers ==
| No. | Portrait | Name (Birth–Death) | Office term | | Cabinet |
|---|---|---|---|---|---|
| 1 | | Ion Leșanu (born 1945) | 21 December 1999 | 27 July 2001 | Braghiș Tarlev I |
| 2 | | Iacov Timciuc (born 1954) | 8 August 2001 | 19 April 2005 | Tarlev I |
| 3 | | Victor Parlicov (born 1978) | 16 February 2023 | 5 December 2024 | Recean |
| 4 | | Dorin Junghietu (born 1986) | 19 February 2025 | Incumbent | Recean Munteanu Tofan |
