= Asbestos shingle =

Roof or wall shingles made with asbestos cement board

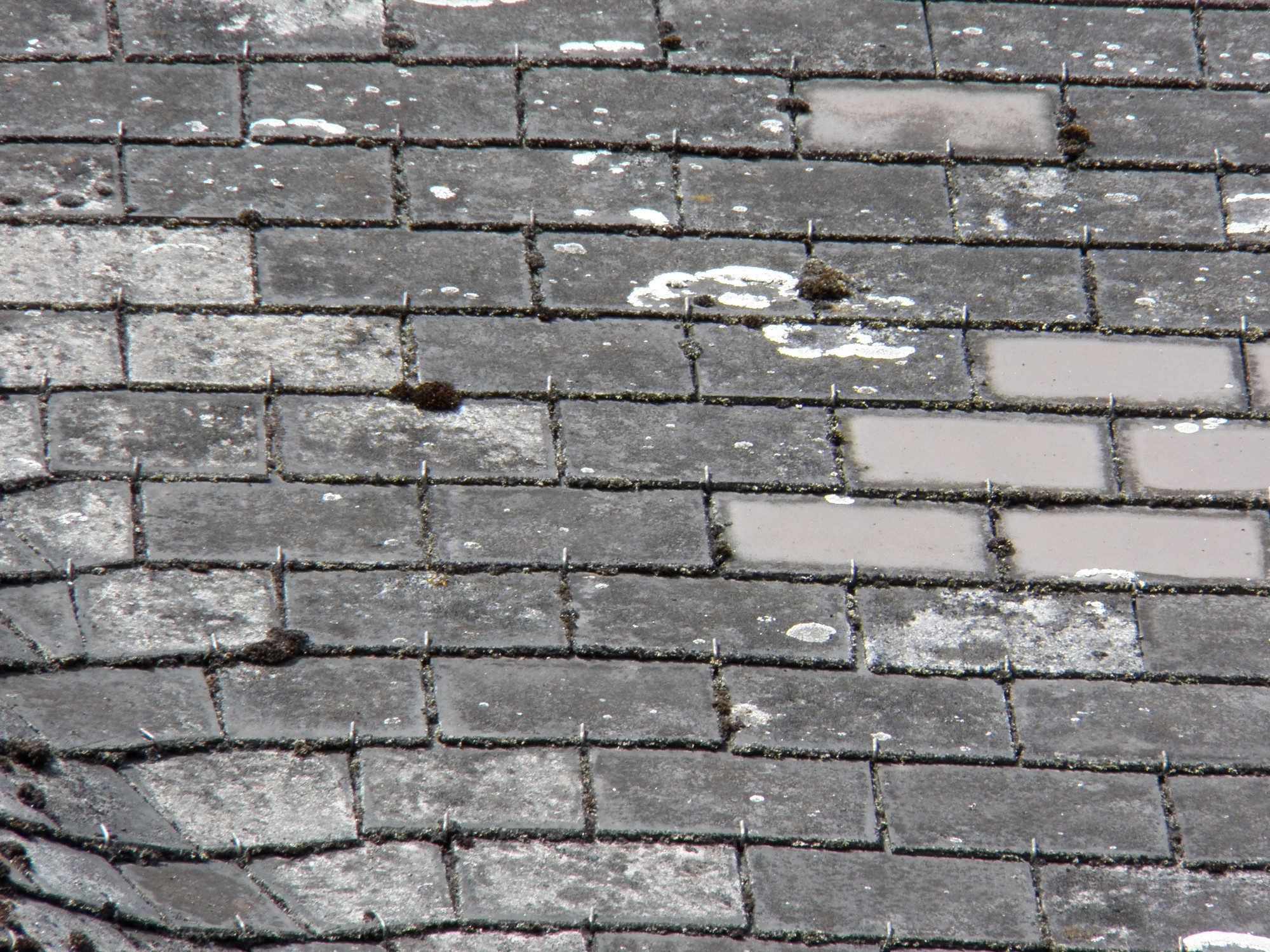
Roof shingles made with asbestos.

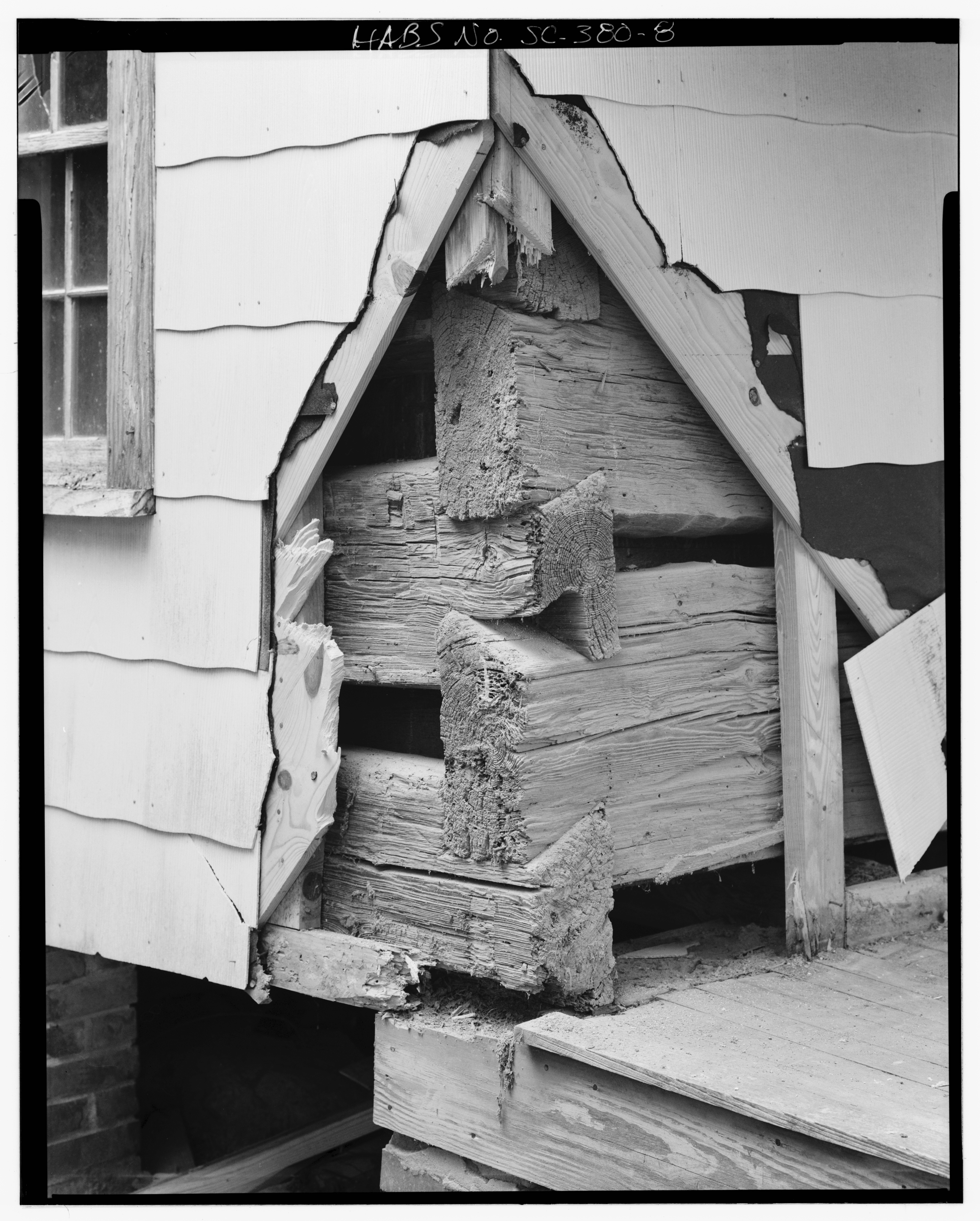
These asbestos wall shingles were partially removed exposing the felt paper, diagonal sheathing, strapping, and log corner notching. Image: Historic American Buildings Survey

Asbestos shingles are roof or wall shingles made with asbestos cement board. They often resemble slate shingles and were mass-produced during the 20th century as these were more resilient to weathering than traditional slate shingles for the reason that slate is very soft and prone to weathering. Due to health risks of asbestos products, the European Union has banned all use of asbestos, including asbestos roof shingles.
