= Iacov Timciuc =

Moldovan politician (born 1954)

Minister of Local Public Administration
- In office 10 June 2009 – 25 September 2009
- President: Vladimir Voronin; Mihai Ghimpu (acting)
- Prime Minister: Zinaida Greceanîi; Vitalie Pîrlog (acting)
- Preceded by: Valentin Guznac

Moldovan Ambassador to China and South Korea
- In office 19 May 2006 – 10 June 2009
- President: Vladimir Voronin
- Prime Minister: Vasile Tarlev; Zinaida Greceanîi
- Preceded by: Victor Borșevici
- Succeeded by: Anatolie Urecheanu

Minister of Energy
- In office 8 August 2001 – 19 April 2005
- President: Vladimir Voronin
- Prime Minister: Vasile Tarlev
- Preceded by: Ion Leșanu
- Succeeded by: Victor Parlicov (2023)

Member of the Moldovan Parliament
- In office 22 March 1998 – 8 August 2001
- Succeeded by: Dumitru Carapirea
- Parliamentary group: Party of Communists

Personal details
- Born: 9 February 1954 (age 72) Zarojeni, Moldavian SSR, Soviet Union
- Other political affiliations: Party of Communists of the Republic of Moldova

Iacov Timciuc (born 9 February 1954) is a Moldovan politician.

== Biography ==
Iacob Timciuc served as minister of energy (2001–2005), before moving to the Ministry of Foreign Affairs and serving as Moldovan Ambassador to China (2006) and then ambassador to Korea (2007). He was appointed as Moldovan minister of local public administration in a Cabinet reshuffle on 10 June 2009.

He was a member of the PCRM, the new Communist Party. Iacob Timciuc declared on 17 March 2010 after the plenary session that he quits the Communists' Party, as "it has adopted an anti-national attitude, ignoring the party's general opinion.
