= Energocom =

Moldovan state-owned energy supplier company

- Type: State-owned enterprise
- Founded: 30 December 2004
- Area served: Moldova
- Owner: Government of Moldova (100%)
- Website: energocom.md

Energocom is a state-owned company that is Moldova's central electricity and gas supplier. It has been the country's central supplier of electricity since 25 March 2018, when a government decision from 1 November 2017 came into force; and of gas since 1 September 2025, replacing Moldovagaz, a company then controlled by more than 60% of its shares by Russia's state-owned Gazprom. As of 2020, the Moldovan government held 100% of Energocom's shares.

Energocom was created by a government decision on 30 December 2004. The company's main purpose was the supply of electricity, its import and export and the carrying out of electricity exchanges with external interconnection partners for the internal electricity balancing market, in order to avoid production–consumption imbalances. Energocom supplied gas as well even before also becoming the national gas supplier.

Since December 2022, the entire gas demand of government-held Moldova (all of the country except Transnistria) has been met with gas transmitted by Energocom, ending gas supplies from Russia to the country. As its revenues in 2023 were around 890 million euros, Energocom entered, for the first time, the top 100 largest companies in southeastern Europe, in last place; the ranking included at the time companies from Albania, Bosnia and Herzegovina, Bulgaria, Croatia, North Macedonia, Moldova, Montenegro, Romania, Serbia and Slovenia.
