= Moldova Steel Works =

Steel-producing company in the unrecognized state of Transnistria

- Type: Joint stock
- Industry: Steel industry
- Founded: 1985
- Headquarters: Rîbnița
- Key people: Sergei Kornev (Director General)
- Products: Steel; Steel products
- Number of employees: 4,000
- Website: www.aommz.com

Moldova Steel Works (Romanian: Uzina Metalurgică Moldovenească; Russian: Молдавский металлургический завод) is a steel-producing company in Rîbnița, in the unrecognized state of Transnistria. It accounts for more than half of Transnistrian total industrial output.

Moldova Steel Works was founded in 1985 for reprocessing of scrap metal. In 1998, majority of its shares was sold to Russian energy company Itera and 28.8% of shares was given to the employees of the company. Production peaked in 2000. In 2004, 90% of shares was acquired by "Austro-Ukrainian Hares Group" of Hares Youssef. Moldova Steel Works became owned by group of Russian–Ukrainian oligarchs, including in addition to Hares Youssef also Hryhoriy Surkis, Ihor Kolomoyskyi, Alisher Usmanov, Vadym Novynskyi and Rinat Akhmetov. Later the Russian company Metalloinvest, controlled by Alisher Usmanov and Vasily Anisimov, became owner of the company. In 2015, the ownership was returned to the Transnistrian authorities for a symbolic price.

On 14 May 2018, the government of Ukraine included Moldova Steel Works in the list of sanctioned companies, but excluded it from the list on 19 March 2019 after a request by Moldovan Prime Minister Pavel Filip.

The initial annual production capacity of the company was 684,000 tonnes of crude steel and 500,000 tonnes of rolled products. Later the capacity was reported to be is around 1,000,000 tonnes of steel and 1,000,000 tonnes of rolled products. In 2018, it produced almost 502,900 tonnes of steel and 497,900 tonnes of rolled goods.

On 20 October 2026, the plant's environmental permit, handed over by the Moldovan government, expired, meaning it would no longer have the right to export or import and would be unable to conduct transactions with scrap metal.
