= Victor Parlicov =

Moldovan politician (born 1978)

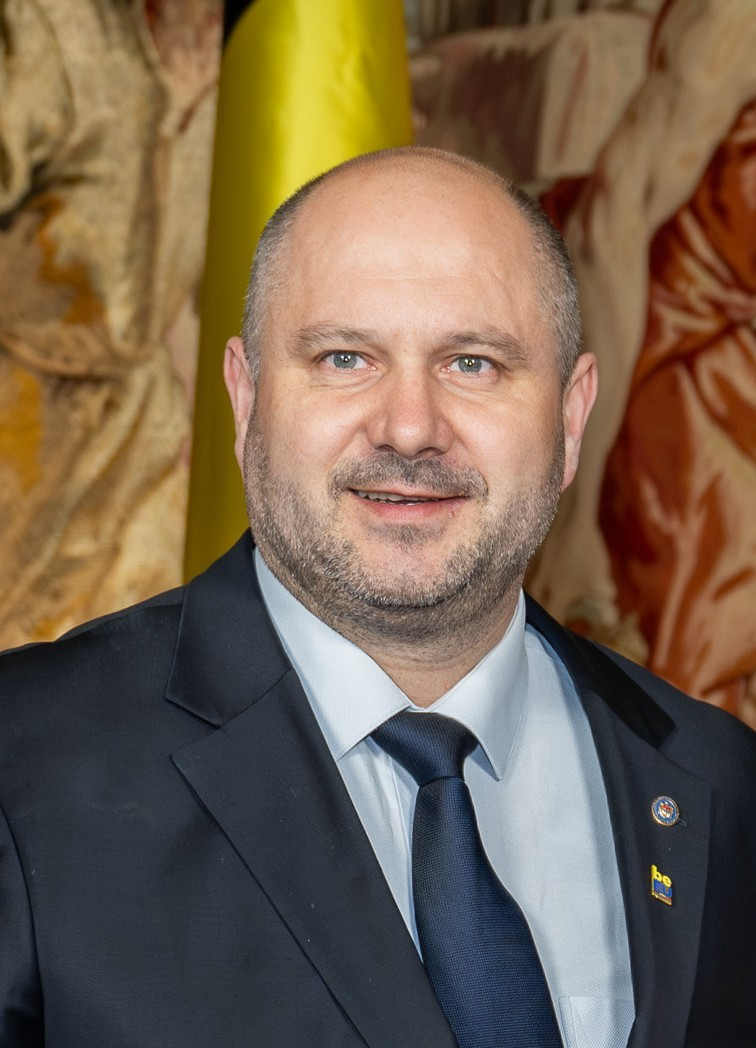
- Parlicov in 2024

Minister of Energy
- In office 16 February 2023 – 5 December 2024
- President: Maia Sandu
- Prime Minister: Dorin Recean
- Preceded by: Iacov Timciuc (2005)
- Succeeded by: Dorin Junghietu

Personal details
- Born: 1 November 1978 (age 47)
- Education: Academy of Economic Studies of Moldova

Victor Parlicov (born 1 November 1978) is a Moldovan energy expert. He was the director of the National Agency for Energy Regulation. He served as the Minister of Energy of Moldova from 2023 to 2024.
