= Cuciurgan power station =

Gas-fired power station in Moldova

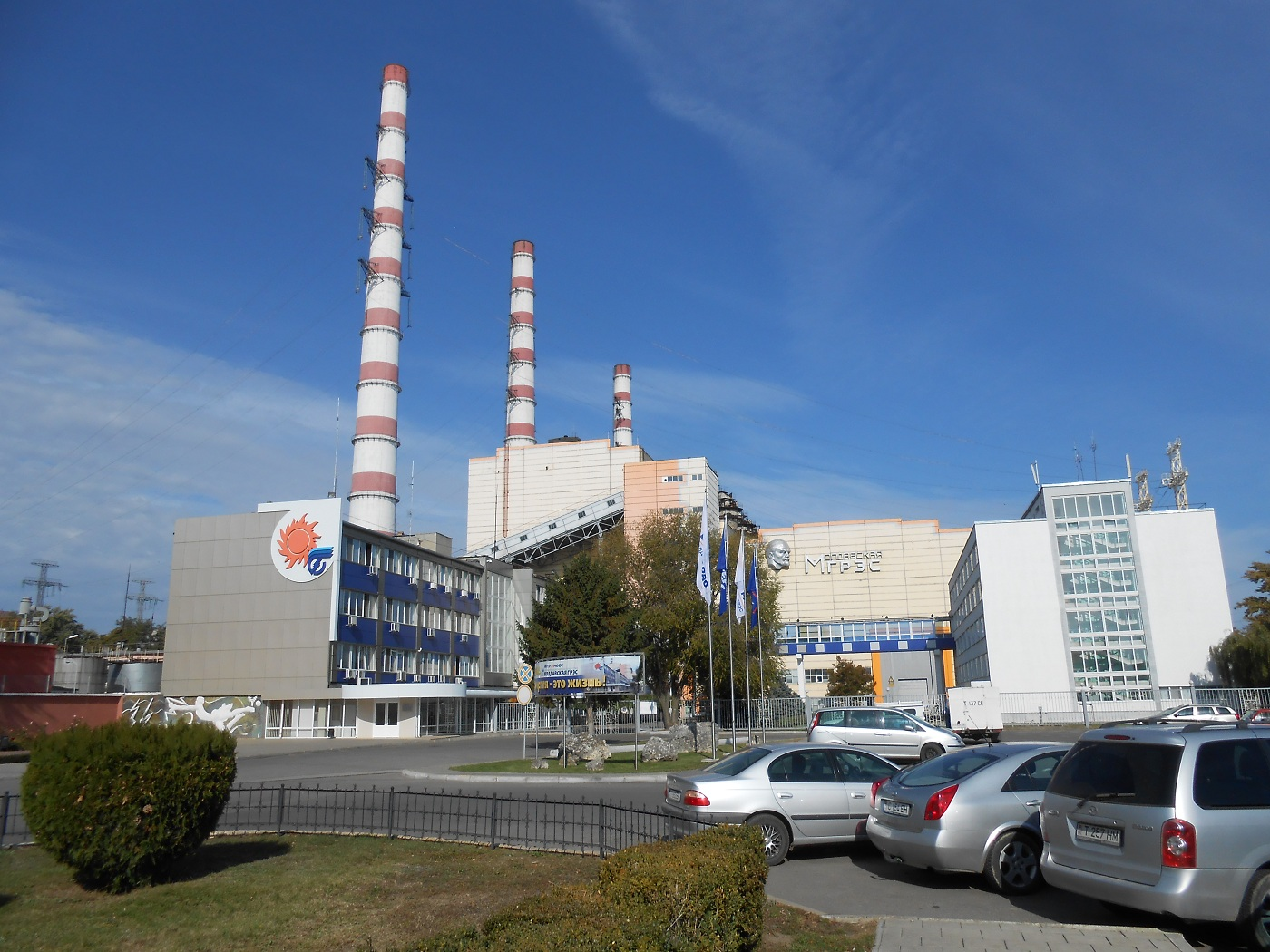
- Official name: Moldavskaya GRES
- Country: Moldova
- Location: Dnestrovsc, Transnistria
- Coordinates: 46°38′3″N 29°56′20″E
- Status: Operational
- Commission date: 26 September 1964
- Owner: Inter RAO

Thermal power station
- Primary fuel: Natural gas, fuel oil, coal

Power generation
- Units operational: 12
- Nameplate capacity: 2,520 MW

External links
- Website: moldgres.com
- Commons: Related media on Commons

The gas-fired Cuciurgan power station (Russian: Молдавская ГРЭС, romanized: Moldovskaya GRES), the largest power station in Moldova, is in Transnistria, on the shores of the Cuciurgan Reservoir bordering Ukraine. In 2024 it generated over three quarters of Moldova's electricity. Commissioned in 1964, it formerly burned some coal and fuel oil. In 2025, Russia stopped supplying the power plant with gas, leading to the 2025 Moldovan energy crisis.

== Technical features ==
The power stations has installed capacity of 2,520 MW. It was originally fueled by natural gas, fuel oil and coal. The plant produces some 75% of Moldova's electricity needs. 51% owned by Inter RAO UES since 2005, in November 2008, Inter RAO UES and Moldelectrica signed an agreement to separate some power units in the power station from the IPS/UPS system and synchronize them with the Continental Europe Synchronous Area in Romania through the 400 kV Kuchurhan–Vulcănești and Vulcănești–Isaccea transmission lines.

== Operation ==
The power station is operated by Moldavskaya GRES, a 100% subsidiary of Russian owned Inter RAO UES. It is the largest power company in an area comprising Moldova and southern Ukraine. The company exports power to Ukraine, Romania and Russia. It was privatized in 2004 by Transnistrian authorities, but official Moldova does not recognize this privatization. On 31 December 2024, at 19:50 EET (17:50 UTC), Moldova's unrecognized breakaway region of Transnistria stopped receiving natural gas supplies from Russia when Ukraine's gas transit deal with Russia expired. Historically, Transnistria had covered most of Moldova's electricity needs through the Cuciurgan power station, which functioned with Russian gas supplied to Transnistria for free. However, with the termination of Russian gas supplies to Transnistra and the end of Moldovan purchases of Transnistrian electricity, the possibility of a humanitarian crisis in Transnistria has risen. Three people have died in Transnistria since the start of the energy crisis due to carbon monoxide poisoning. Electricity prices have also risen significantly in Moldova.

=== Debt liability ===
The Cuciurgan power station owes an estimated $9 billion to Gazprom in 2022 as it has not paid for gas usage for over 15 years.

=== Planned termination of sales to Moldova ===
In November 2022 the power station ceased supplying Moldova with electricity after Russia reduced gas supplies. Recommenced in early 2023, by May 2023 Moldova announced it would no longer be buying electricity from the Cuciurgan power station once the high-voltage Vulcănești–Chișinău power line from Romania is installed, scheduled for 2025.
