= Moldovagaz =

Moldovagaz is the largest energy company in Moldova.

== History ==
Moldovagaz was founded in 1999. The Russian company Gazprom owns a majority stake of Moldovagaz. On 13 December 2024, the Moldovan parliament voted in favour of imposing a state of emergency in the energy sector. In January 2025, Prime Minister Dorin Recean intends to pursue the possible nationalisation of the company.

== Ownership ==
The company has the following ownership:

Org	Percent
Gazprom	50% plus one
Moldovan government	35.33%
Transnistrian government	13.44%
Others	1.23%.
