= Dubăsari Dam =

Dam in Dubăsari, Moldova

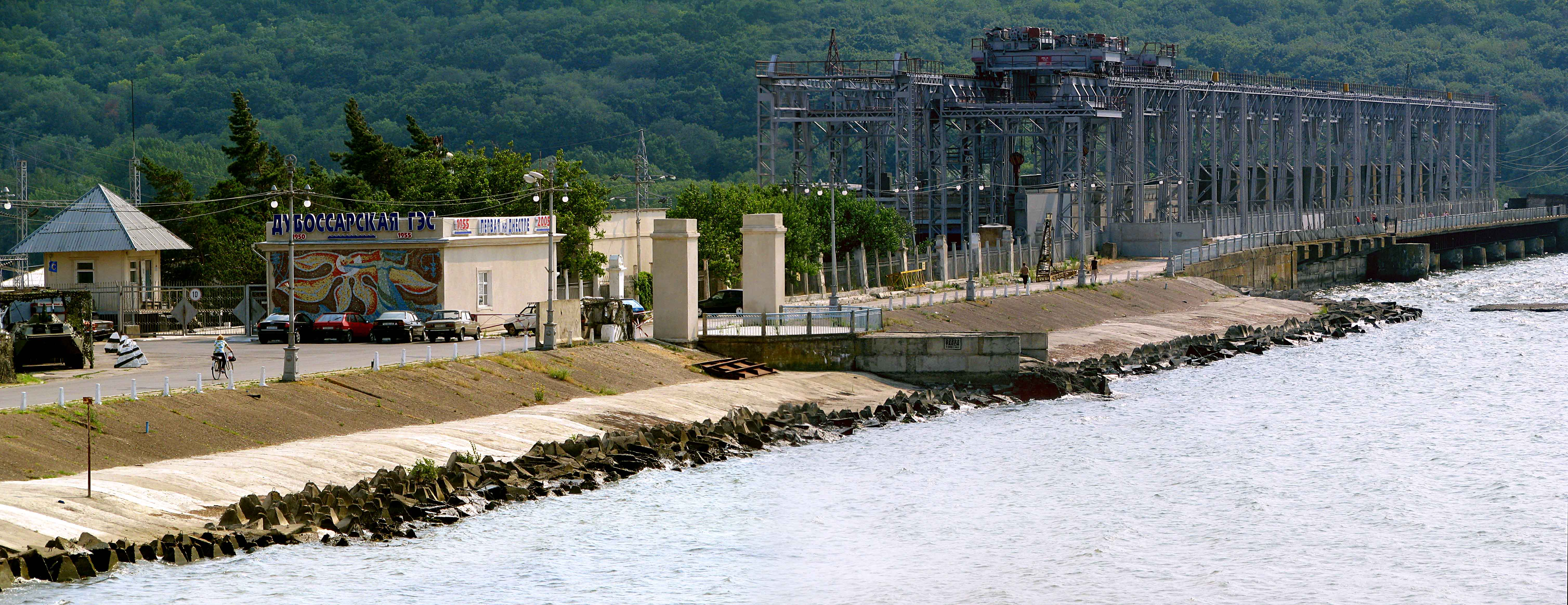

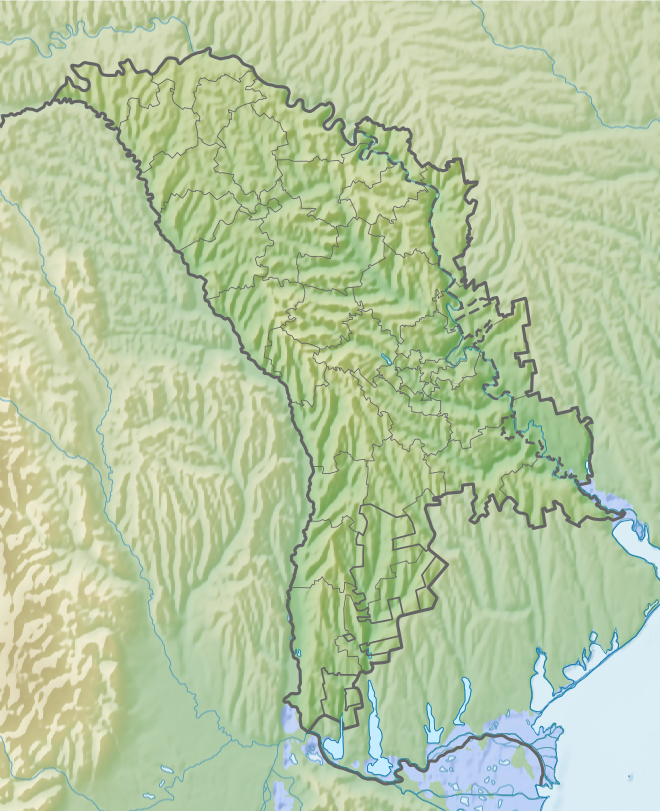
- Location within Moldova
- Country: Moldova
- Location: Dubăsari
- Coordinates: 47°16′40″N 29°7′25″E
- Status: Operational
- Construction began: 1951
- Opening date: 1954

Dam and spillways
- Impounds: Dniester

Reservoir
- Creates: Dubăsari Reservoir
- Surface area: 67.5 km^{2} (26.1 sq mi)

Power Station
- Commission date: 1954
- Installed capacity: 48 MW

The Dubăsari Dam (also HPP Dubasari, Romanian: Hidroelectrocentrala de la Dubăsari) is a hydroelectric dam at the Dniester river near Dubăsari in Transnistria, Moldova. It was built in 1951–1954. The installed capacity of the hydroelectric power station is 48 MW.

The Dubăsari Dam creates the Dubăsari Reservoir (Romanian: Rezervuarul Dubăsari). The reservoir is 128 kilometres (80 mi) long and has an average width of 528 metres (1,732 ft). Water surface area is equal to 67.5 square kilometres (26.1 sq mi).

== See also ==
- Dniester Hydroelectric Station – located upstream
