= Recean Cabinet =

Government of Moldova

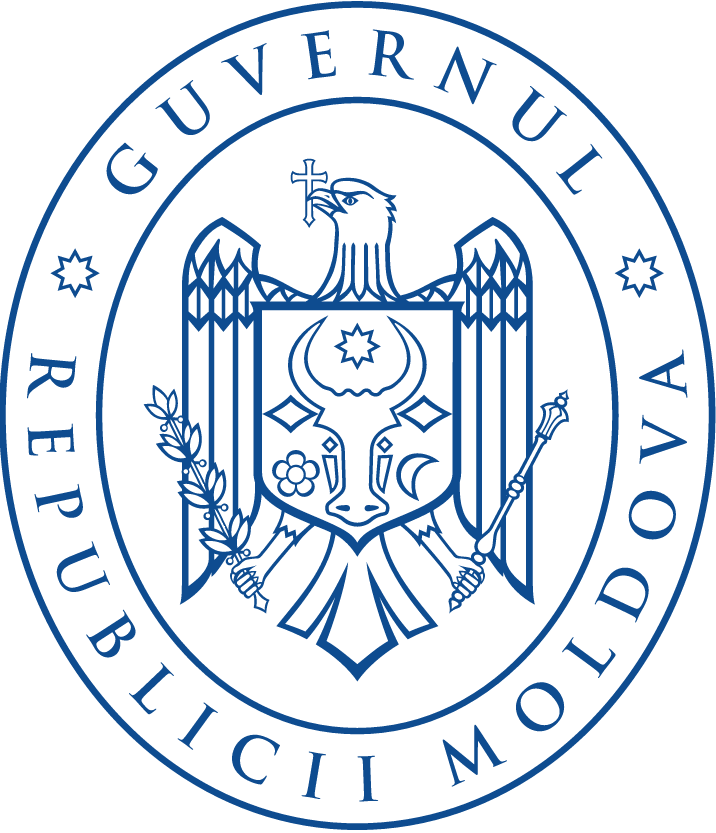
- 21st Cabinet of Moldova

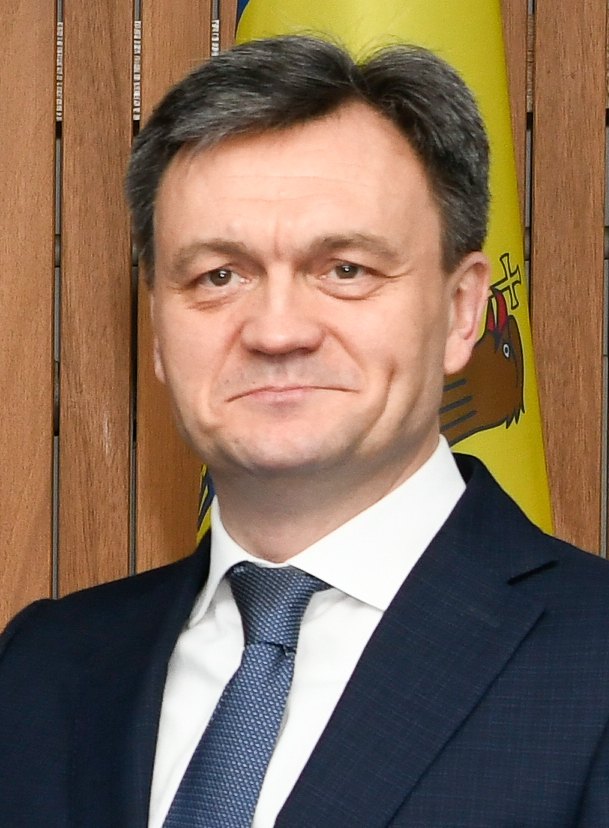
- Prime Minister Dorin Recean
- Date formed: 16 February 2023
- Date dissolved: 1 November 2025

People and organisations
- President: Maia Sandu
- Head of government: Dorin Recean
- Deputy head of government: Nicu Popescu; Dumitru Alaiba; Vladimir Bolea; Oleg Serebrian; Cristina Gherasimov; Mihai Popșoi; Doina Nistor; Roman Roșca
- No. of ministers: 14
- Ministers removed: 15
- Total no. of members: 18
- Member parties: PAS; Independent
- Status in legislature: Majority government
- Opposition parties: BCS
- Opposition leaders: Igor Dodon; Vladimir Voronin

History
- Election: 2021
- Predecessor: Gavrilița Cabinet
- Successor: Munteanu Cabinet

The Recean Cabinet was the Cabinet of Moldova led by former Interior Minister Dorin Recean from 16 February 2023 to 1 November 2025. Following an airport attack, Recean reshuffled three cabinet positions.

The Governor of Gagauzia election in 2023, meant that Evghenia Guțul became the new governor, with a term starting on 19 July 2023.

== Composition ==
Prime Minister and Deputy Prime Ministers in the Recean cabinet
Title	Minister		Term of office		Party
Title	Image	Name	Start	End	Party
Prime Minister		Dorin Recean	16 February 2023	1 November 2025	Independent
Deputy Prime Minister		Nicu Popescu	6 August 2021	29 January 2024	Independent
Deputy Prime Minister		Mihai Popșoi	29 January 2024	Incumbent	PAS
Deputy Prime Minister		Dumitru Alaiba	16 February 2023	14 March 2025	PAS
Deputy Prime Minister		Doina Nistor	14 March 2025	1 November 2025	Independent
Deputy Prime Minister		Vladimir Bolea	16 February 2023	Incumbent	PAS
Deputy Prime Minister for European Integration		Cristina Gherasimov	5 February 2024	Incumbent	Independent
Deputy Prime Minister for Reintegration		Oleg Serebrian	19 January 2022	30 June 2025	Independent
Deputy Prime Minister for Reintegration		Roman Roșca	23 July 2025	1 November 2025	PAS

Ministers in the Recean cabinet
Title	Minister		Term of office		Party
Title	Image	Name	Start	End	Party
Minister of Agriculture and Food Industry		Vladimir Bolea	8 July 2022	19 November 2024	PAS
Minister of Agriculture and Food Industry		Ludmila Catlabuga	19 November 2024	22 July 2026	Independent
Minister of Culture		Sergiu Prodan	6 August 2021	1 November 2025	Independent
Minister of Defense		Anatolie Nosatîi	6 August 2021	Incumbent	Independent
Minister of Economic Development and Digitalization		Dumitru Alaiba	16 November 2022	14 March 2025	PAS
Minister of Economic Development and Digitalization		Doina Nistor	14 March 2025	1 November 2025	Independent
Minister of Education and Research		Anatolie Topală	6 August 2021	14 July 2023	Independent
Minister of Education and Research		Dan Perciun	17 July 2023	Incumbent	PAS
Minister of Energy		Victor Parlicov	16 February 2023	5 December 2024	Independent
Minister of Energy		Dorin Junghietu	19 February 2025	Incumbent	Independent
Minister of Environment		Rodica Iordanov	16 November 2022	13 March 2024	Independent
Minister of Environment		Sergiu Lazarencu	14 March 2024	1 November 2025	PAS
Minister of Finance		Veronica Sirețeanu	16 February 2023	27 September 2023	Independent
Minister of Finance		Petru Rotaru	28 September 2023	31 July 2024	Independent
Minister of Finance		Victoria Belous	31 July 2024	1 November 2025	Independent
Minister of Foreign Affairs		Nicu Popescu	6 August 2021	29 January 2024	Independent
Minister of Foreign Affairs		Mihai Popșoi	29 January 2024	Incumbent	PAS
Minister of Health		Ala Nemerenco	6 August 2021	1 November 2025	Independent
Minister of Infrastructure and Regional Development		Lilia Dabija	16 February 2023	14 July 2023	Independent
Minister of Infrastructure and Regional Development		Andrei Spînu	17 July 2023	11 November 2024	PAS
Minister of Infrastructure and Regional Development		Vladimir Bolea	19 November 2024	Incumbent	PAS
Minister of Internal Affairs		Ana Revenco	6 August 2021	14 July 2023	Independent
Minister of Internal Affairs		Adrian Efros	17 July 2023	19 November 2024	Independent
Minister of Internal Affairs		Daniella Misail-Nichitin	19 November 2024	Incumbent	Independent
Minister of Justice		Veronica Mihailov-Moraru	16 February 2023	1 November 2025	Independent
Minister of Labour and Social Protection		Alexei Buzu	9 January 2023	1 November 2025	Independent
Governor of Gagauzia		Irina Vlah	15 April 2015	19 July 2023	Independent
Governor of Gagauzia		Evghenia Guțul	19 July 2023	5 August 2025	Victory (Note: Initially elected as a candidate of the ȘOR party, but after the party was banned by the Constitutional Court on 19 June 2023, she became an independent Başkan. In 2024, she became secretary of the Victory Bloc during its foundation in Moscow.)
Governor of Gagauzia		Ilia Uzun (acting)	5 August 2025	Incumbent	Independent

== Notes ==
Preceded by Gavrilița Cabinet	Cabinet of Moldova; 16 February 2023	Succeeded by Munteanu Cabinet
