= Gavrilița Cabinet =

Government of Moldova

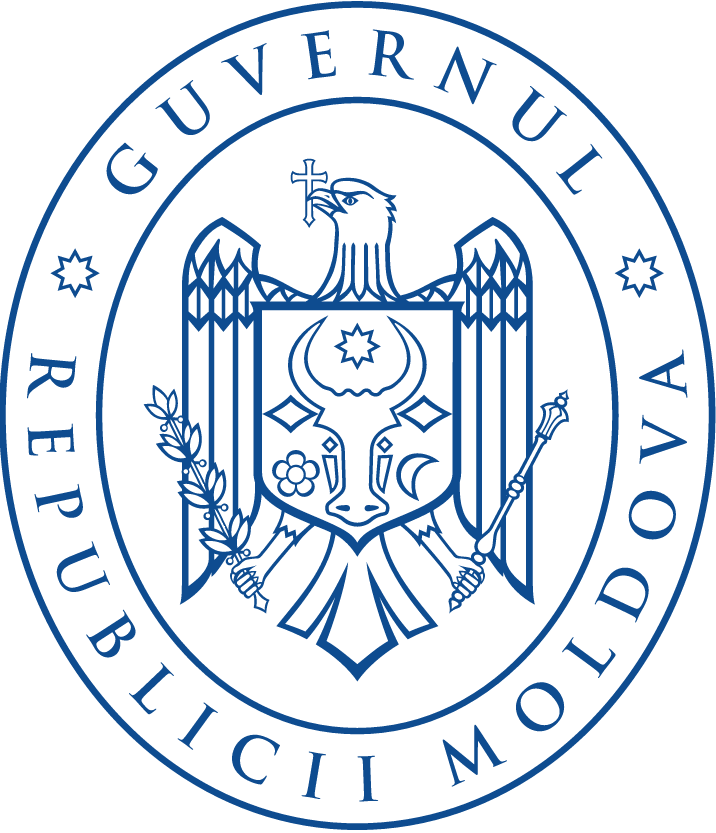
- 20th Cabinet of Moldova

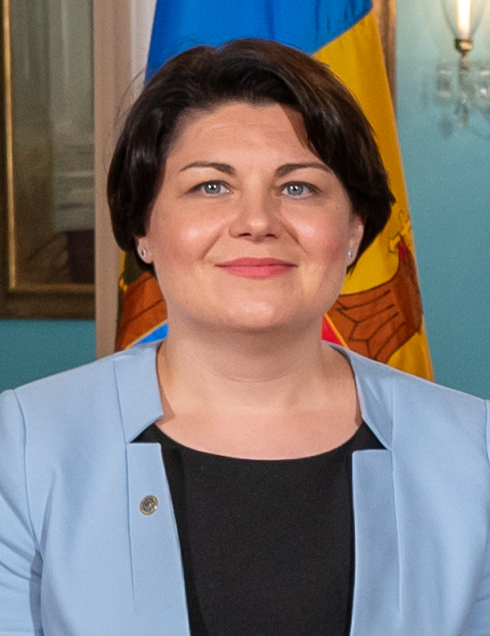
- Prime minister Natalia Gavrilița
- Date formed: 6 August 2021
- Date dissolved: 16 February 2023

People and organisations
- President: Maia Sandu
- Head of government: Natalia Gavrilița
- Deputy head of government: Nicu Popescu; Andrei Spînu; Vladislav Kulminski; Oleg Serebrian; Iurie Țurcanu
- No. of ministers: 13
- Ministers removed: 5
- Total no. of members: 17
- Member parties: PAS; Independent
- Status in legislature: Majority government
- Opposition parties: BCS; Șor
- Opposition leaders: Vlad Batrîncea; Vladimir Voronin; Ilan Shor

History
- Election: 2021
- Predecessor: Chicu Cabinet
- Successor: Recean Cabinet

The Gavrilița Cabinet (pronunciation: [ɡavriˈlitsa]) was the Cabinet of Moldova, led by former Finance Minister Natalia Gavrilița from 6 August 2021 until 16 February 2023.

Gavrilița was previously proposed as prime minister by Maia Sandu in February 2021, but was rejected by the PSRM-Șor parliamentary majority. Gavrilița resigned along with the cabinet on 10 February 2023. She cited a lack of support for enacting reforms she had proposed in her resignation news conference.

== History ==
During the vote, the government received the support of 61 members of Moldovan parliament. The ruling Party of Action and Solidarity won mandates during early parliamentary elections in 2021. Gavrilița's appointment marked the end of the six-month absence of government in the country after the previous government resigned in December 2020.

Natalia Gavrilița became the third woman in the post of Prime Minister of Moldova (after Maia Sandu, Zinaida Greceanîi, excluding acting Natalia Gherman). After her nomination by President Sandu, the entire executive branch in the republic became headed by women. As of 6 August 2021, the similar situation has happened only in Estonia, with the current president Kersti Kaljulaid and prime minister Kaja Kallas.

In total, three women became ministers. The head of Gagauzia, Irina Vlah, who was elected in a separate vote in 2015, also participates in the work of the cabinet.

== Composition ==
The new cabinet has 13 ministries, instead of nine as in recent years. The Ministry of Health, the Ministry of Labor and Social Protection, the Ministry of Education, the Ministry of Culture, the Ministry of Transport and the Ministry of Regional Development and Infrastructure became separate agencies. Furthermore, the Ministry of Environment was recreated.

Nicu Popescu returned to the government as Minister of Foreign Affairs, after working in the Sandu Cabinet. The Minister of Health Ala Nemerenco also returned to the government after working with Maia Sandu.

The Başkan (Governor) of Gagauzia is elected by universal, equal, direct, secret and free suffrage on an alternative basis for a term of 4 years. One and the same person can be a governor for no more than two consecutive terms. The Başkan of Gagauzia is confirmed as a member of the Moldovan government by a decree of the President of Moldova.

Prime Minister and Deputy Prime Ministers in the Gavrilița cabinet
Title	Minister		Term of office		Party
Title	Image	Name	Start	End	Party
Prime Minister		Natalia Gavrilița	6 August 2021	16 February 2023	PAS
Deputy Prime Minister		Nicu Popescu	6 August 2021	29 January 2024	Independent
Deputy Prime Minister		Andrei Spînu	6 August 2021	16 February 2023	PAS
Deputy Prime Minister for Reintegration		Vladislav Kulminski	6 August 2021	5 November 2021	Independent
Deputy Prime Minister for Reintegration		Oleg Serebrian	19 January 2022	30 June 2025	Independent
Deputy Prime Minister for Digitalization		Iurie Țurcanu	6 August 2021	16 February 2023	Independent

Ministers in the Gavrilița cabinet
Title	Minister		Term of office		Party
Title	Image	Name	Start	End	Party
Minister of Agriculture and Food Industry		Viorel Gherciu	6 August 2021	8 July 2022	Independent
Minister of Agriculture and Food Industry		Vladimir Bolea	8 July 2022	19 November 2024	PAS
Minister of Culture		Sergiu Prodan	6 August 2021	1 November 2025	Independent
Minister of Defense		Anatolie Nosatîi	6 August 2021	Incumbent	Independent
Minister of Economy		Sergiu Gaibu	6 August 2021	16 November 2022	Independent
Minister of Economy		Dumitru Alaiba	16 November 2022	16 February 2023	PAS
Minister of Education and Research		Anatolie Topală	6 August 2021	14 July 2023	Independent
Minister of Environment		Iuliana Cantaragiu	6 August 2021	8 September 2022	PAS
Minister of Environment		Vladimir Bolea (acting)	7 October 2022	16 November 2022	PAS
Minister of Environment		Rodica Iordanov	16 November 2022	13 March 2024	Independent
Minister of Finance		Dumitru Budianschi	6 August 2021	16 February 2023	PAS
Minister of Foreign Affairs and European Integration		Nicu Popescu	6 August 2021	29 January 2024	Independent
Minister of Health		Ala Nemerenco	6 August 2021	1 November 2025	Independent
Minister of Infrastructure and Regional Development		Andrei Spînu	6 August 2021	16 February 2023	PAS
Minister of Internal Affairs		Ana Revenco	6 August 2021	14 July 2023	Independent
Minister of Justice		Sergiu Litvinenco	6 August 2021	16 February 2023	PAS
Minister of Labour and Social Protection		Marcel Spatari	6 August 2021	9 January 2023	Independent
Minister of Labour and Social Protection		Alexei Buzu	9 January 2023	1 November 2025	Independent
Governor of Gagauzia		Irina Vlah	15 April 2015	19 July 2023	Independent

Preceded by Chicu Cabinet	Cabinet of Moldova; 6 August 2021 – 16 February 2023	Succeeded by Recean Cabinet
