= Chișinău International Airport shooting =

2023 shooting in Moldova

2023 Chișinău International Airport shooting
- Location: Chișinău International Airport, Chișinău, Moldova
- Date: 30 June 2023; ~18:30 (EEST)
- Attack type: Mass shooting
- Deaths: 3 (including the perpetrator)
- Injuries: 1
- Perpetrator: Rustam Ashurov

On 30 June 2023, a man shot and killed two people and injured another at the Chișinău International Airport in Moldova after he was denied entry into the country. The perpetrator was then shot and apprehended by security forces and died of his injuries three days later.

== Attack ==
A police source said that the passenger arrived from Istanbul, Turkey and that he used firearms against the border guards. The Moldovan news website NewsMaker, citing unnamed officials, said a man took a gun from a border police officer after he was taken to a no-entry zone. He killed an employee of the General Inspectorate of the Customs Service of the Republic of Moldova and an employee of the Airport Security Service. Another person, a passenger, was injured and hospitalized. According to some reports, the perpetrator took hostages and hid in one of the rooms of the airport. A video from the scene showed passengers near the airport lying on the grass while the building was being evacuated. At 18:30 local time (EEST), the Ministry of Internal Affairs of Moldova reported that the man who staged the shooting had been detained. The Moldovan Prosecutor-General later said he had been hospitalized after suffering serious injuries following intervention by Moldovan special forces.

The Government of Moldova stated that all flights were delayed, and passengers were evacuated from the airport. Additionally, Moldovan President Maia Sandu said that state institutions had been put on high alert and expressed condolences to the families and relatives of the victims, and also added that the shooter was a foreign citizen who was denied entry into the country by authorities for security reasons.

== Perpetrator ==
According to initial unconfirmed information, the perpetrator was a Russian citizen. There were also claims that the perpetrator was a mercenary of the Wagner Group. Later, Moldovan Prime Minister Dorin Recean stated that the attacker was a 43-year-old citizen of Tajikistan who had been banned from entering Moldova for security reasons. Tajikistani authorities later identified him as Rustam Ashurov, a member of an "organised criminal group" that had kidnapped a bank executive in Dushanbe a week before.

On 3 July at 22:35 EEST, Ashurov died of his wounds at a hospital.

== Aftermath ==
On 14 July, Recean announced that three Moldovan ministers had resigned following a governmental meeting on the shooting. These were Minister of Infrastructure and Regional Development Lilia Dabija, Minister of Internal Affairs Ana Revenco and Minister of Education and Research Anatolie Topală. They were replaced in their posts on 17 July by Andrei Spînu, Adrian Efros and Dan Perciun, respectively.
