= Dumitru Alaiba =

Moldovan economist and politician (born 1982)

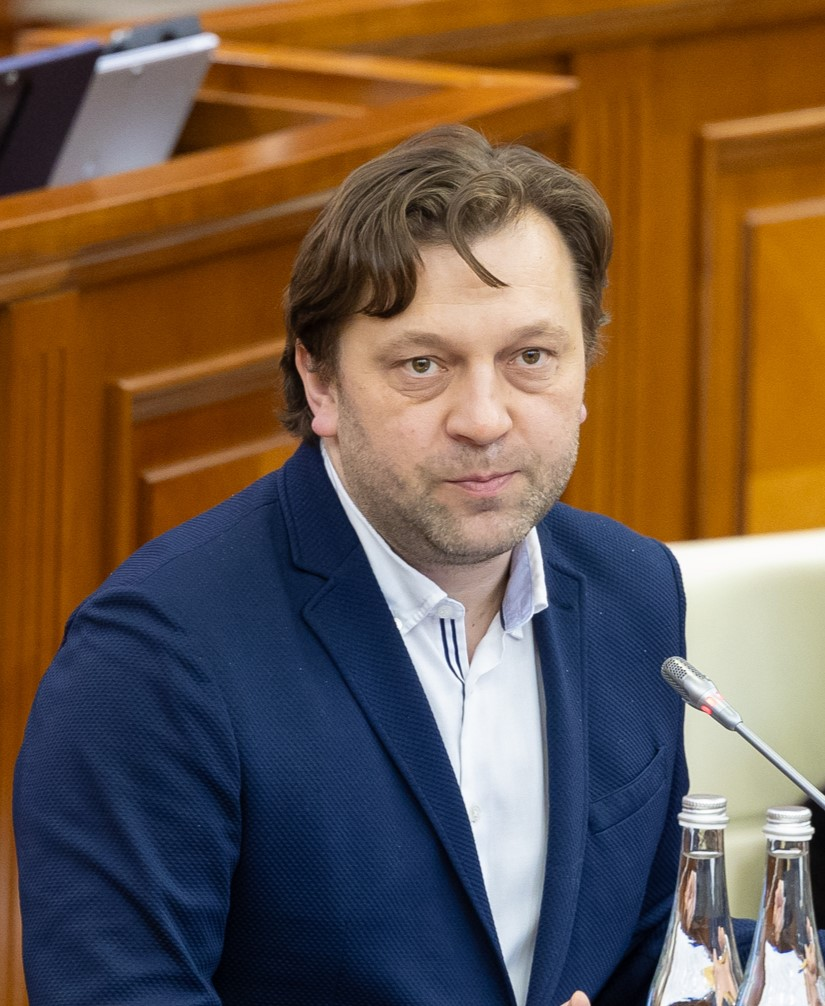
- Alaiba in 2024

Deputy Prime Minister of Moldova
- In office 16 February 2023 – 14 March 2025 Serving with: Nicu Popescu; Mihai Popșoi; Vladimir Bolea
- President: Maia Sandu
- Prime Minister: Dorin Recean
- Succeeded by: Doina Nistor

Minister of Economic Development and Digitalization
- In office 16 February 2023 – 14 March 2025
- President: Maia Sandu
- Prime Minister: Dorin Recean
- Preceded by: Himself (as Minister of Economy)
- Succeeded by: Doina Nistor

Minister of Economy
- In office 16 November 2022 – 16 February 2023
- President: Maia Sandu
- Prime Minister: Natalia Gavrilița
- Preceded by: Sergiu Gaibu
- Succeeded by: Himself (as Minister of Economic Development and Digitalization)

Member of the Moldovan Parliament
- In office 9 March 2019 – 16 November 2022
- Succeeded by: Mihail Leahu
- Parliamentary group: Party of Action and Solidarity
- Constituency: United States and Canada
- Majority: 2,206 (49.1%)

Personal details
- Born: 14 April 1982 (age 44) Soroca, Moldavian SSR, Soviet Union
- Education: Academy of Economic Studies of Moldova; Rovaniemi University of Applied Sciences

Dumitru Alaiba (born 14 April 1982) is a Moldovan economist and politician. He served as Deputy Prime Minister and Minister of Economic Development and Digitalization in the Recean Cabinet.

Before his appointment in the Government of Moldova, he served as Member of the Moldovan Parliament since february 2019.
