= Doina Nistor =

Moldovan public official (born 1977)

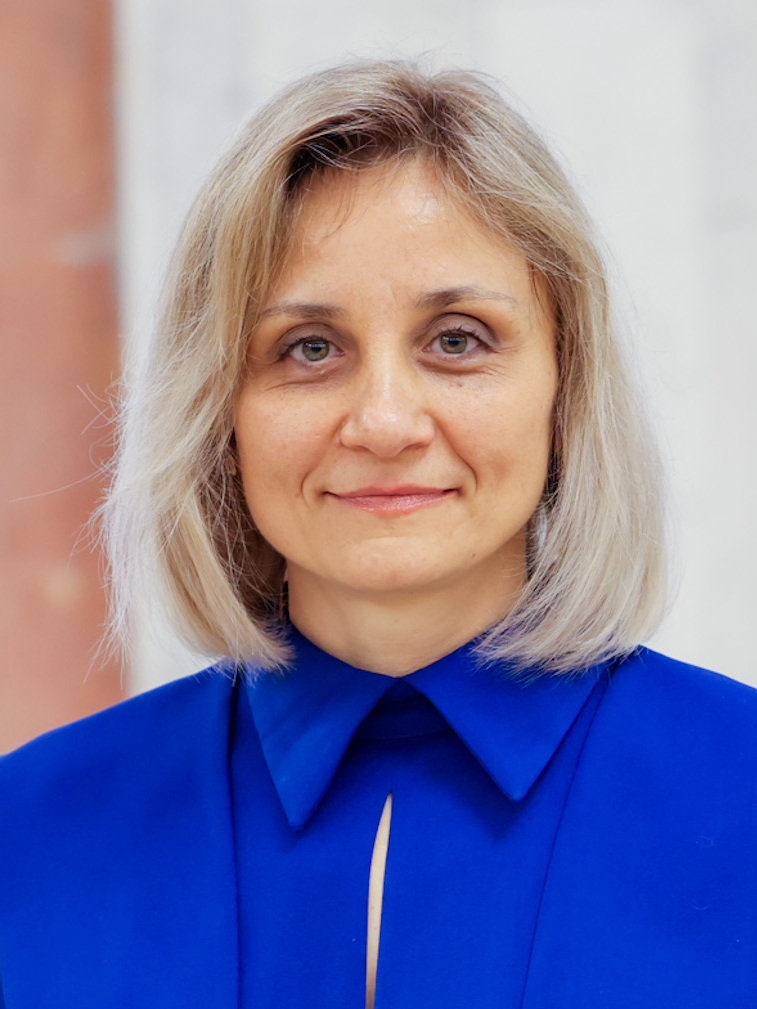
- Nistor in 2025

Deputy Prime Minister of Moldova
- In office 14 March 2025 – 1 November 2025 Serving with: Mihai Popșoi; Vladimir Bolea
- President: Maia Sandu
- Prime Minister: Dorin Recean
- Preceded by: Dumitru Alaiba
- Succeeded by: Eugen Osmochescu

Minister of Economic Development and Digitalization
- In office 14 March 2025 – 1 November 2025
- President: Maia Sandu
- Prime Minister: Dorin Recean
- Preceded by: Dumitru Alaiba
- Succeeded by: Eugen Osmochescu

Personal details
- Born: 27 December 1977 (age 48) Chișinău, Moldavian SSR, Soviet Union
- Education: Academy of Economic Studies of Moldova; Technical University of Moldova

Doina Nistor (born 27 December 1977) is a Moldovan economist who served as Deputy Prime Minister and Minister of Economic Development and Digitalization of Moldova in the Recean Cabinet.
