= Andrei Spînu =

Moldovan politician

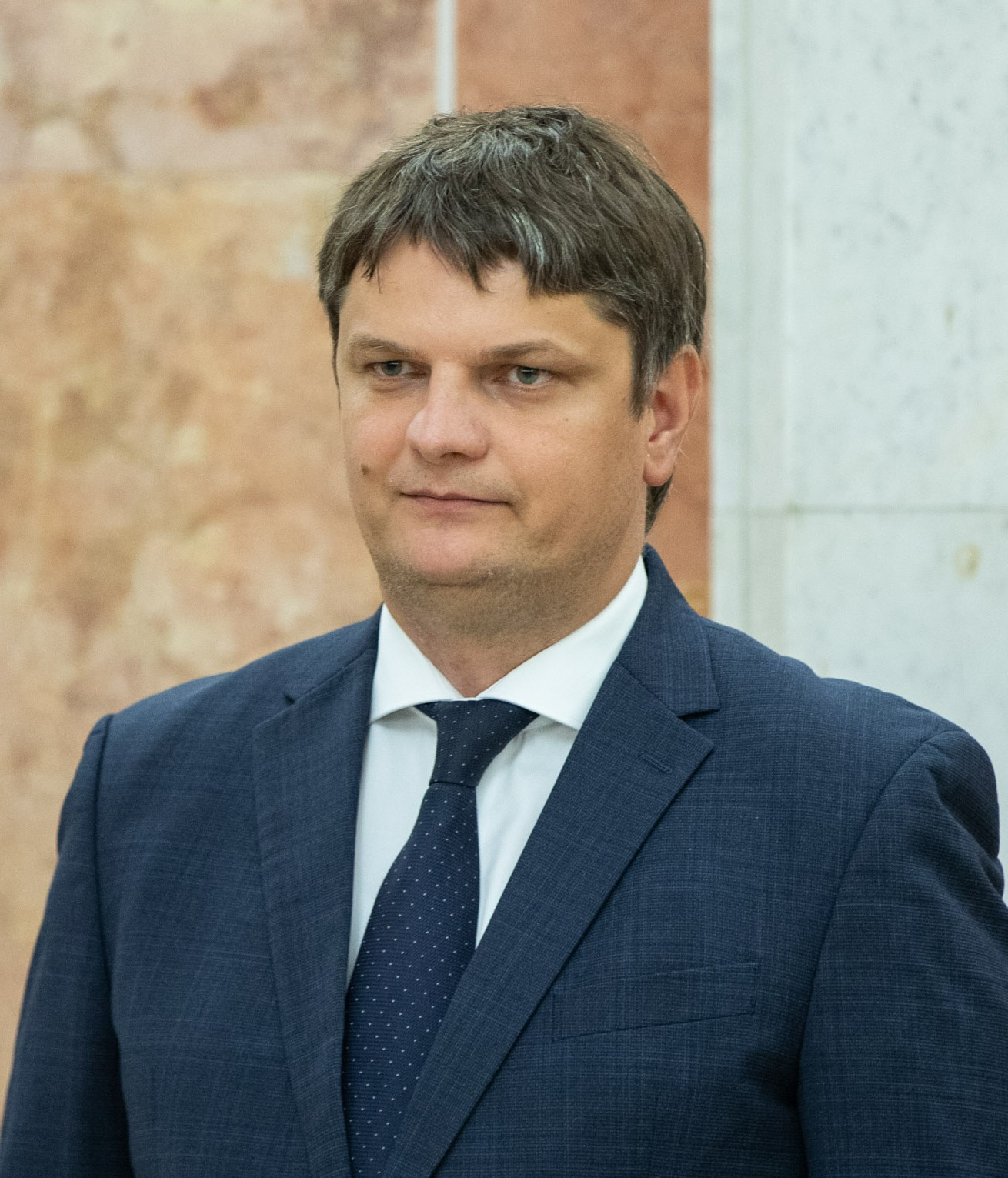
- Spînu in 2023

Minister of Infrastructure and Regional Development
- In office 17 July 2023 – 11 November 2024
- President: Maia Sandu
- Prime Minister: Dorin Recean
- Preceded by: Lilia Dabija
- Succeeded by: Vladimir Bolea
- In office 6 August 2021 – 16 February 2023
- President: Maia Sandu
- Prime Minister: Natalia Gavrilița
- Preceded by: Vasile Bîtca (2017) (as Minister of Regional Development and Construction)
- Succeeded by: Lilia Dabija

Secretary General of the Office of the President of Moldova
- In office 6 August 2021 – 17 July 2023
- President: Maia Sandu
- Preceded by: Veaceslav Negruța
- In office 6 August 2021 – 9 August 2021
- President: Maia Sandu
- Preceded by: Nicolae Posturusu
- Succeeded by: Cristina Gherasimov

Deputy Prime Minister of Moldova
- In office 23 July 2021 – 8 September 2021 Serving with: Nicu Popescu
- President: Maia Sandu
- Prime Minister: Natalia Gavrilița
- Preceded by: Sergiu Pușcuța
- Succeeded by: Vladimir Bolea

Member of the Moldovan Parliament
- In office 23 July 2021 – 8 September 2021
- Succeeded by: Boris Popa
- Parliamentary group: Party of Action and Solidarity

Secretary General of the Government of Moldova
- In office 18 July 2019 – 14 November 2019
- President: Igor Dodon
- Prime Minister: Maia Sandu
- Preceded by: Lilia Palii
- Succeeded by: Liliana Iaconi

Deputy Minister of Youth and Sport
- In office 12 August 2015 – 29 January 2016
- President: Nicolae Timofti
- Prime Minister: Valeriu Streleț; Gheorghe Brega (acting); Pavel Filip
- Minister: Loretta Handrabura; Victor Zubcu

Personal details
- Born: 10 June 1986 (age 40) Ratuș, Moldavian SSR, Soviet Union
- Party: Party of Action and Solidarity (2019–2024); Liberal Democratic Party (before 2019)
- Education: Academy of Economic Studies of Moldova (BBA); Harvard University

Andrei Spînu (pronunciation: [ˈspɨnu]; born 10 June 1986) is a Moldovan entrepreneur and politician, who was Deputy Prime Minister of Moldova in the Government of Gavrilița and served as Minister of Infrastructure and Regional Development in the Recean Cabinet.
