= Latin Union =

Former international organization of Romance-language countries

Latin Union: Unió Llatina (Catalan); Union Latine (French); Unione Latina (Italian); União Latina (Portuguese); Uniunea Latină (Romanian); Unión Latina (Spanish)
- 1954–2012 (suspension)
- Logo

- Headquarters: Paris, France; 48°46′N 2°11′E
- Official languages: Spanish; Catalan; French; Italian; Portuguese; Romanian
- Members: Spanish: Bolivia · Chile · Colombia · Costa Rica · Cuba · Dominican Republic · Ecuador · El Salvador · Equatorial Guinea . Guatemala · Honduras · Nicaragua · Panama · Paraguay · Peru · Philippines · Spain · Uruguay · Venezuela; French: France · Haiti · Côte d'Ivoire · Monaco · Senegal; Italian: Italy · San Marino; Portuguese: Angola · Brazil · Cape Verde · East Timor · Guinea-Bissau · Mozambique · Portugal · São Tomé and Príncipe; Romanian: Romania · Moldova; Catalan: Andorra; Observers: Argentina · Holy See · Mexico · Sovereign Military Order of Malta

Leaders
  - President of the Congress: Oleg Serebrian
  - Secretary-General: José Luis Dicenta Ballester
- Historical era: Post-Cold War
  - Established: 15 May 1954
  - Suspended: 31 July 2012 (suspension)
- Website www.unilat.org

The Latin Union (Note: Official name in six languages: French: Union Latine; Italian: Unione Latina; Portuguese: União Latina; Romanian: Uniunea Latină; Spanish: Unión Latina; Catalan: Unió Llatina) was an international organization of nations that use Romance languages, whose activities have been suspended since 2012. Headquartered in Paris, France, it aimed to protect, project, and promote the common cultural heritage of Latin peoples and unifying identities of the Romance, and Romance-influenced, world. It was created in 1954 in Madrid, Spain. It started to operate in 1983 and its membership rose from 12 to 36 states, including countries in North America, South America, Northern Europe, Southern Europe, Africa, and the Asia-Pacific region.

Due to financial difficulties, the Latin Union announced on 26 January 2012 the suspension of its activities, the dissolution of its Secretariat General (effective 31 July 2012), and the termination of employment for all the organization's personnel.

== Membership ==
According to the Latin Union's website, membership was open to any nation that met the following criteria:

- Linguistic criteria:
  - Latin-derived language as official language, used in education, and commonly used in the mass media or in daily life
- Linguistic/cultural criteria:
  - Existence of significant literature in a Latin-derived language
  - Press and publication in Latin-derived language
  - Television with a strong proportion of the programming in a Latin-derived language
  - Radio widely broadcast in a Latin-derived language
- Cultural criteria :
  - Direct or indirect inheritance of the legacy of Ancient Rome, to which the state remains faithful and which it perpetuates mainly through the education of Latin
  - Cultural education of Latin-derived foreign languages
  - Exchange programmes with other Latin countries
  - Societal organization, particularly in the legal plane, based on respect for fundamental liberties, the general principles of human rights and democracy, tolerance, and freedom of religion

== Official languages ==
The official languages of the Latin Union were Spanish, French, Italian, Portuguese, Romanian, and Catalan. Spanish, French, Italian and Portuguese were used as working languages. All the texts of general diffusion were translated into these four languages, with some also going into Romanian and Catalan.

== Member states ==
=== Catalan ===
- Andorra

=== French ===
- France
- Haiti
- Ivory Coast
- Monaco
- Senegal

=== Italian ===
- Italy
- San Marino

=== Portuguese ===
- Angola
- Brazil
- Cape Verde
- Guinea-Bissau
- Mozambique
- Portugal
- São Tomé and Príncipe
- Timor-Leste

=== Romanian ===
- Romania
- Moldova

=== Spanish ===
- Bolivia
- Chile
- Colombia
- Costa Rica
- Cuba
- Dominican Republic
- Ecuador
- El Salvador
- Guatemala
- Honduras
- Nicaragua
- Panama
- Paraguay
- Peru
- Philippines
- Spain
- Uruguay
- Venezuela

=== Observers ===
- Argentina
- Mexico
- Holy See
- Sovereign Military Order of Malta

== Organization ==
The Union was composed of three main bodies, namely, the Congress, the Executive Council, and the General Secretariat.

=== Congress ===
The Congress, which consisted of the representatives of all the Member States, met in ordinary assembly every two years. Its main functions were

- to adopt the budget,
- to define the general direction of the Union,
- to receive the new Member States formally, and
- to elect and appoint different Member States to be the Presidents, Vice-Presidents, and members of the sub-organisations of the Union.

A President and two Vice-Presidents were also elected by the Congress. Oleg Serebrian from the Republic of Moldova was the last President.

There were also two auxiliary bodies of the Congress, namely, the Commission of Adhesions and the Commission of Candidacies.

- The Commission of Adhesions was composed of 10 Member States and was responsible for promoting the adherence of all the Member States of the Union.
- The Commission of Candidacies was composed of 9 Member States and was responsible for examining the validity of the candidacies, taking account of the geographical and linguistic-cultural division.

=== Executive Council ===
The Executive Council was the executive branch of the Union. It consisted of 12 Member States, which were elected by the Congress every four years, and led by a President and two Vice-Presidents, which were also elected by the Congress.

There were also two auxiliary commissions subordinated to the Executive Council:

- The Commission of Finance and Programmes
- The Commission of Statues

=== General Secretariat ===
The Latin Union was directed by a Secretary-General appointed every four years by the Congress. The Secretary was in charge of the execution of the programmes and implemented the decisions made by the Congress and the Executive Council in the matter of budget and general direction. Jose Luis Dicenta Ballester was at one time Secretary-General of the Union.

Subordinated to the Secretary-General, there were 4 directors:

- Director of Administration and Finance
- Director of Culture and Communication
- Director of Promotion and Education of the Languages
- Director of Terminology and Industry of the Language

=== Finance ===
The finance of the Union was mainly supported by obligatory contributions from the Member States. For some activities, the Union may have collaborated with other public or private institutions.

== See also ==
- Community of Portuguese Language Countries
  - Lusophone
- Italic peoples
- Latin America
- Latin Bloc (proposed alliance)
- Latin Monetary Union
- Organisation internationale de la Francophonie
- Organization of Ibero-American States
  - Association of Academies of the Spanish Language
  - Hispanic
  - Hispanidad
  - Hispanic America
  - Ibero-America
  - Panhispanism
- Pan-Latinism
- Romance languages
- United States of Latin Africa

== Notes ==
By ISO 639-3 code
Enter an ISO code to find the corresponding language article.
