= Iurie Țurcanu =

Moldovan politician

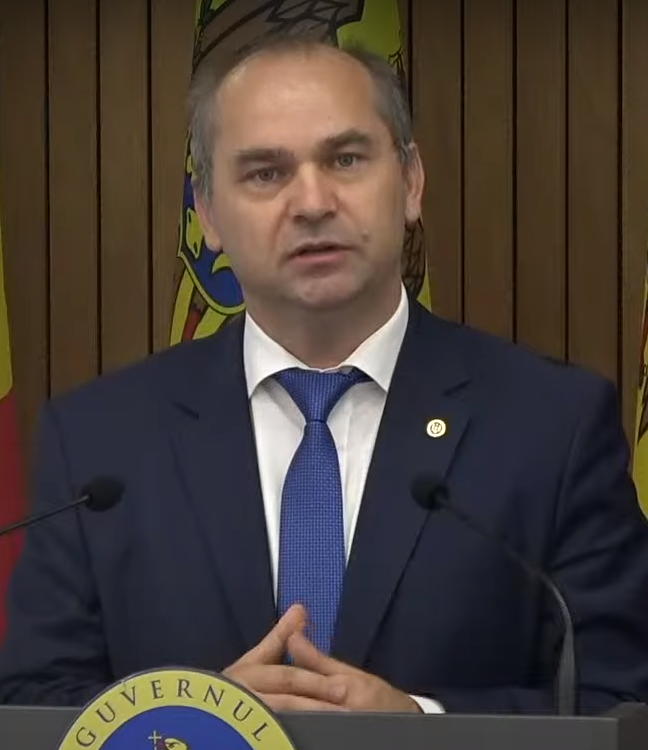
- Țurcanu in 2022

Deputy Prime Minister of Moldova for Digitalization
- In office 6 August 2021 – 16 February 2023
- President: Maia Sandu
- Prime Minister: Natalia Gavrilița

Personal details
- Born: 21 June 1973 (age 53) Corlăteni, Moldavian SSR, Soviet Union
- Education: Technical University of Moldova

Iurie Țurcanu (pronunciation: [ˈjuri.e tsurˈkanu]; born 21 June 1973) is a Moldovan politician.

== Biography ==
Iurie Țurcanu was born on 21 June 1973 in Corlăteni, in the Rîșcani District. He was the first Deputy Prime Minister for Digitalization of Moldova. This post was created on 6 August 2021 and is responsible for coordinating the activities of three Moldovan institutions: the E-Governance Agency, the Public Services Agency and the Information Technology and Cyber Security Service. In September 2021, Țurcanu represented Moldova at the international conference Connecting Municipalities in Digital Era: Best practices from the EU and talked about the problems and objectives of Moldova in the digital realm. Later, in December 2021, Țurcanu said that, during the tenure of the Gavrilița Cabinet, it is possible that Moldovans could start to engage on electronic voting, although he did not give guarantees for members of the Moldovan diaspora.
