= Nicu Popescu =

Moldovan diplomat and politician

Nicu Popescu OR
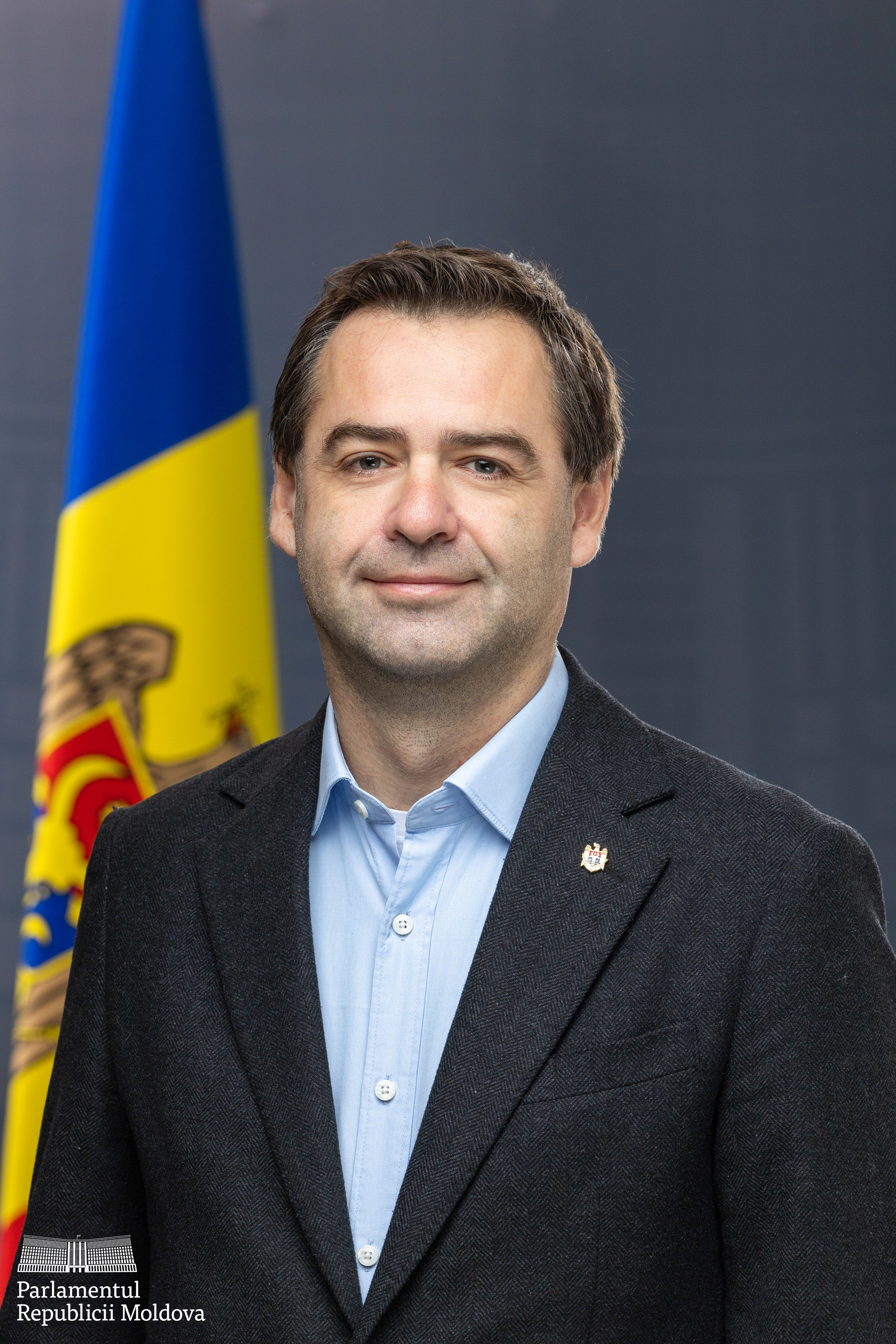
- Official portrait, 2025

Special Envoy for European Affairs and Strategic Partnerships
- Incumbent
- Assumed office 10 November 2025
- President: Maia Sandu

Member of the Moldovan Parliament
- In office 22 October 2025 – 1 November 2025
- Succeeded by: Angela Munteanu-Pojoga
- Parliamentary group: Party of Action and Solidarity

Deputy Prime Minister of Moldova
- In office 6 August 2021 – 26 January 2024 Serving with: Andrei Spînu; Dumitru Alaiba; Vladimir Bolea
- President: Maia Sandu
- Prime Minister: Natalia Gavrilița; Dorin Recean
- Succeeded by: Mihai Popșoi

Minister of Foreign Affairs and European Integration
- In office 6 August 2021 – 26 January 2024
- President: Maia Sandu
- Prime Minister: Natalia Gavrilița; Dorin Recean
- Preceded by: Aureliu Ciocoi
- Succeeded by: Mihai Popșoi (as Minister of Foreign Affairs)
- In office 11 June 2019 – 14 November 2019
- President: Igor Dodon
- Prime Minister: Maia Sandu
- Preceded by: Tudor Ulianovschi
- Succeeded by: Aureliu Ciocoi

Personal details
- Born: 25 April 1981 (age 45) Chișinău, Moldavian SSR, Soviet Union
- Party: Independent
- Spouse: Elena Gnedina
- Children: 2
- Education: Moscow State Institute of International Relations (BA); Central European University (MA, PhD)
- Profession: author, diplomat
- Awards: Order of the Republic; Officer of the Legion of Honor (France)
- Website: http://www.nicupopescu.eu

Nicolae "Nicu" Popescu (born 25 April 1981) is a Moldovan diplomat, author, and politician, who served as Minister of Foreign Affairs and European Integration of Moldova from 6 August 2021 until 26 January 2024 in the Gavrilita and then Recean cabinets. He was also Moldova's Foreign Minister from 11 June to 14 November 2019 in the Sandu Cabinet. He is now a distinguished fellow at the European Council on Foreign Relations and visiting professor at Sciences Po-Paris. With Tiago Antunes, former state secretary for EU affairs in Portugal, he currently co-chairs an ECFR task force on 'lessons-learned' from the war in Ukraine consisting of several European foreign policy personalities.

== Biography ==
Popescu holds a PhD and MA in International Relations from Central European University in Budapest, Hungary. He also holds a BA from Moscow State Institute of International Relations obtained in 2002.

=== Think-tank researcher ===
From 2005 to 2007, he was a researcher at the Centre for European Policy Studies (CEPS) in Brussels, Belgium.

Between 2007 and 2009 and 2011–2012, he was researcher then head of program at the European Council on Foreign Relations (ECFR) office in London. In 2010 and 2012–2013, he was Foreign Policy advisor and European Integration advisor to the Prime Minister Vlad Filat. In that post he dealt, besides his core foreign policy responsibilities, with reforms related to EU-Moldova visa-liberalization process and Moldova's accession to the European Common Aviation Area. Between 2013 and 2018, he worked as a senior analyst at the European Union Institute for Security Studies, the EU's official foreign policy think tank. In 2018-2019, and 2020-2021 he returned to ECFR as Head of the Wider Europe Programme.

In April 2024, Popescu returned to ECFR as a distinguished policy fellow. With Laurence Boone and Tiago Antunes, former state secretaries for EU affairs in France and Portugal respectively, he launched an ECFR task force on lessons learned from the war in Ukraine. The task force works on ways to improve Europe's capacity to react to wars and large-scale crises. Several European foreign policy personalities have been involved in the work of the task force, among them Camille Grand, Dmytro Kuleba, Kostas Bakoyannis, Mark Leonard, Kajsa Ollongren, Jana Kobzova and others. The task force works closely with the EU institutions, European development banks and several EU governments to strengthen Europe’s capacity to cope with crises.

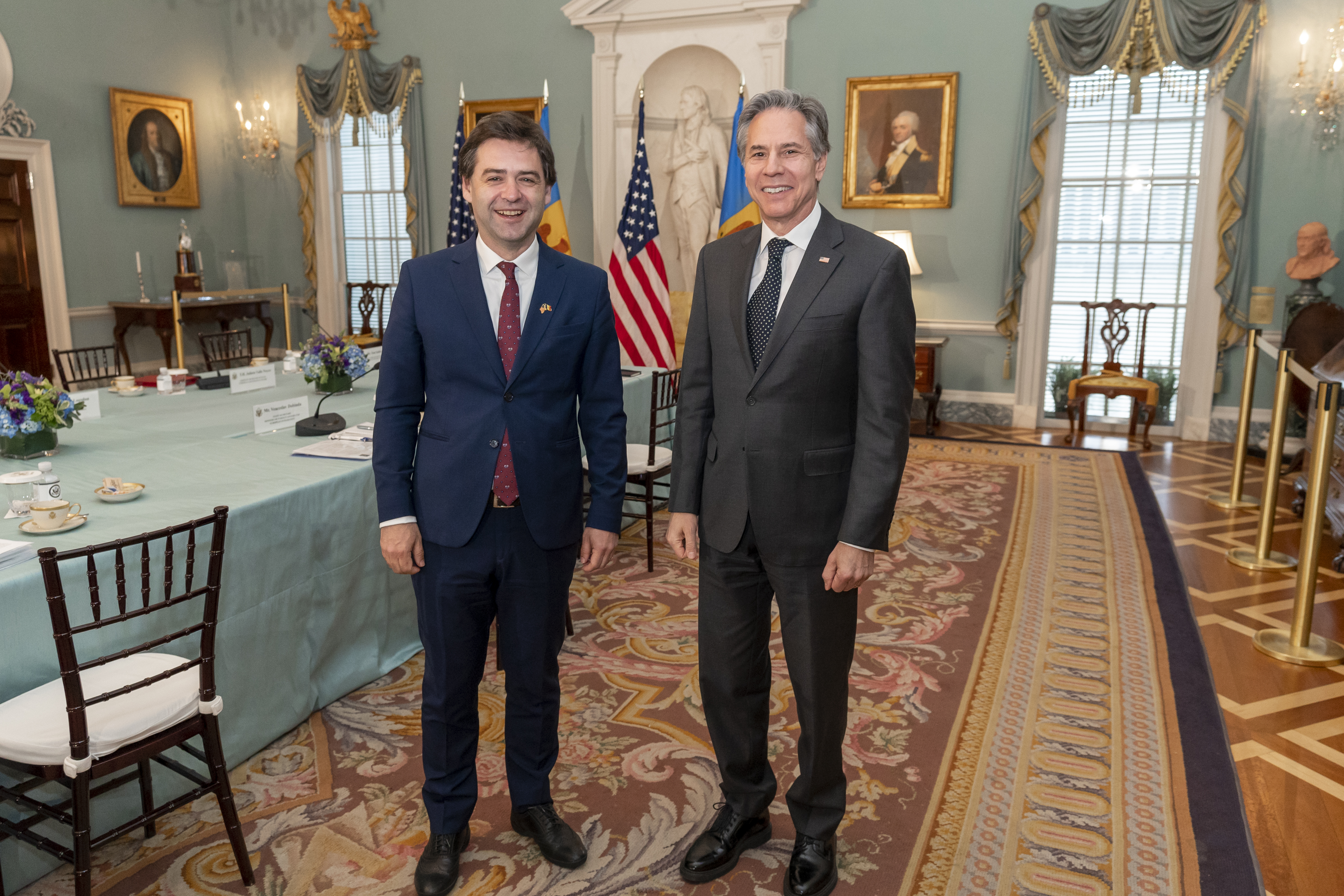
Popescu with U.S. Secretary of State Antony Blinken in April 2022

He has published three books and over 60 academic or policy publications. His articles appeared in the Financial Times, New York Times, the Guardian, Foreign Policy, Le Monde, Le Soir, and Euractiv, and he had a blog on the EUobserver.

=== Minister of Foreign Affairs and European Integration ===
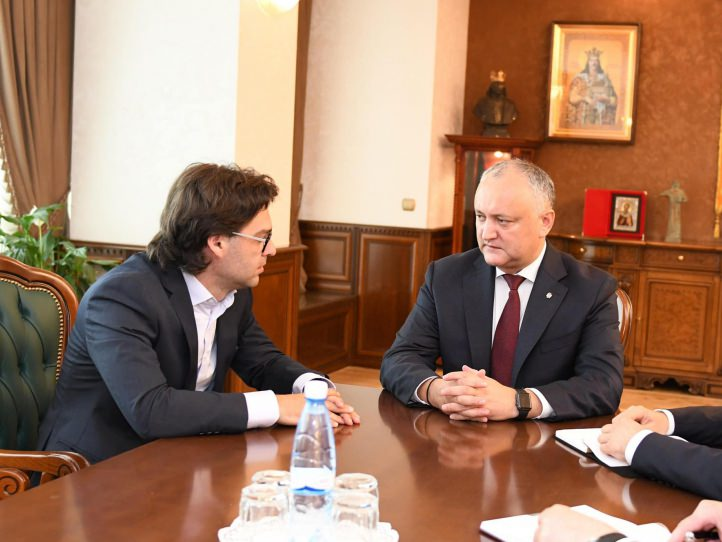
Nicu Popescu with Moldovan president Igor Dodon in 2019

In the early weeks of his first term in office in 2019 while the Sandu Cabinet exercised power, he called for the accession of Moldova to the European Union. Among his key priorities were: accession to the EU, deepening the relationship with Romania, not least through the acceleration of joint infrastructure projects - bridges, energy interconnection and roaming liberalisation.

Popescu served from August 2021 in the Gavrilița Cabinet and its successor, the Recean Cabinet.

The Ministry of Foreign Affairs and European Integration, under the leadership of Nicu Popescu, condemned from the first hours the war started by the Russian Federation against Ukraine. Since February 2022, as part of President Sandu's team, Popescu has played a crucial role in managing various crises resulting from the war in Ukraine - maintaining peace and stability in Moldova, assisting refugee and dealing with the impact of severe economic and energy disruptions caused by the war. Popescu was instrumental in mobilising international support for Moldova and accelerating the EU accession process for Moldova. He was credited with building a ‘diplomatic bastion’ that helped protect Moldova in the dangerous geopolitical environment shaped by Russia’s aggression against Ukraine.

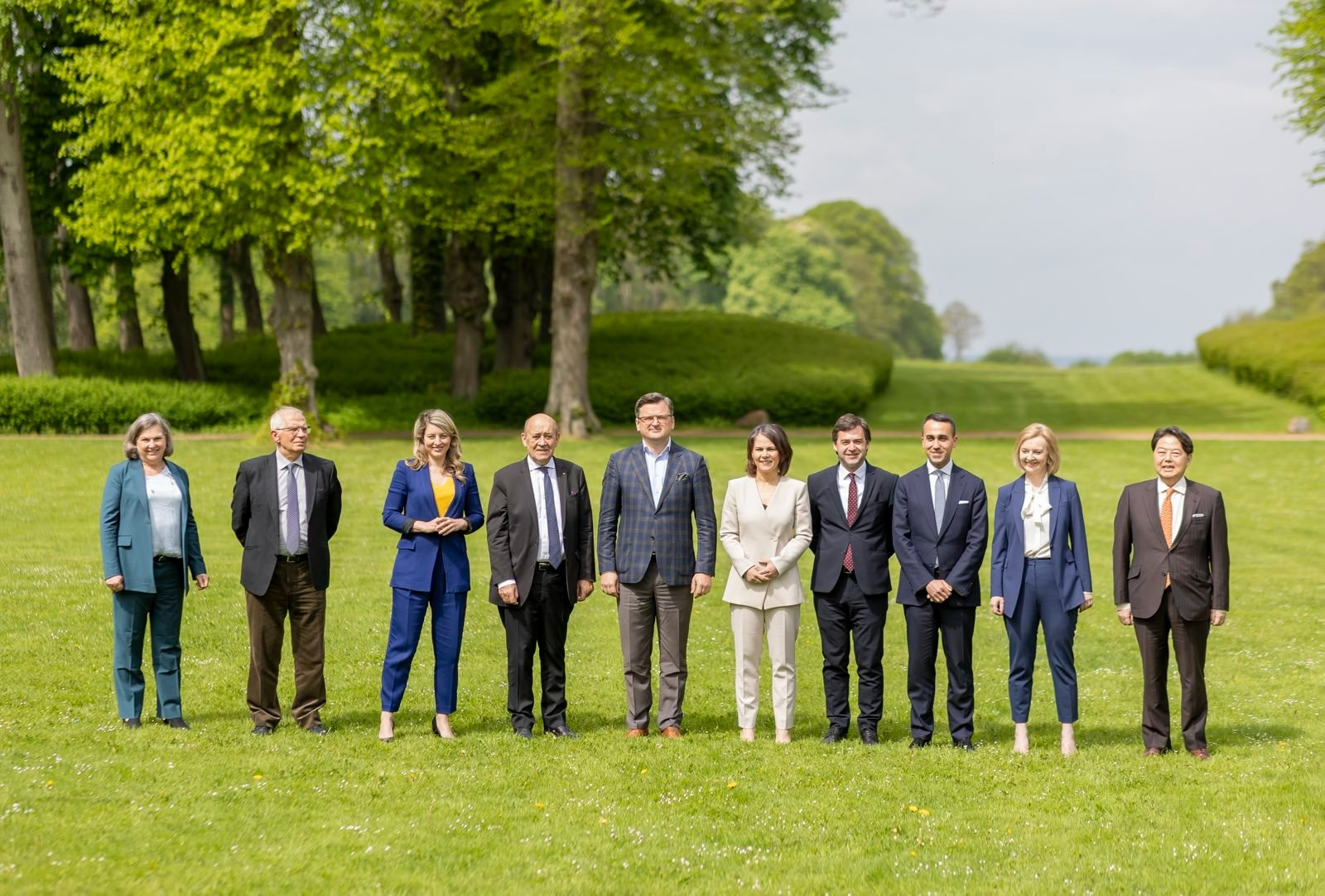
Popescu at G7 Summit in Germany, May 2022.

Under his mandate, on 23 June 2022, the Republic of Moldova obtained the status of a candidate country for EU accession. Subsequently, on 14 December 2023, following a year and a half of implementing the European Commission's recommendations under the leadership of Minister Popescu, the European Council decided to initiate accession negotiations with the Republic of Moldova. During this time, Moldova registered the best dynamic in EU acquis implementation among all EU candidate countries, according to the European Commission enlargement report of 8 November 2023.

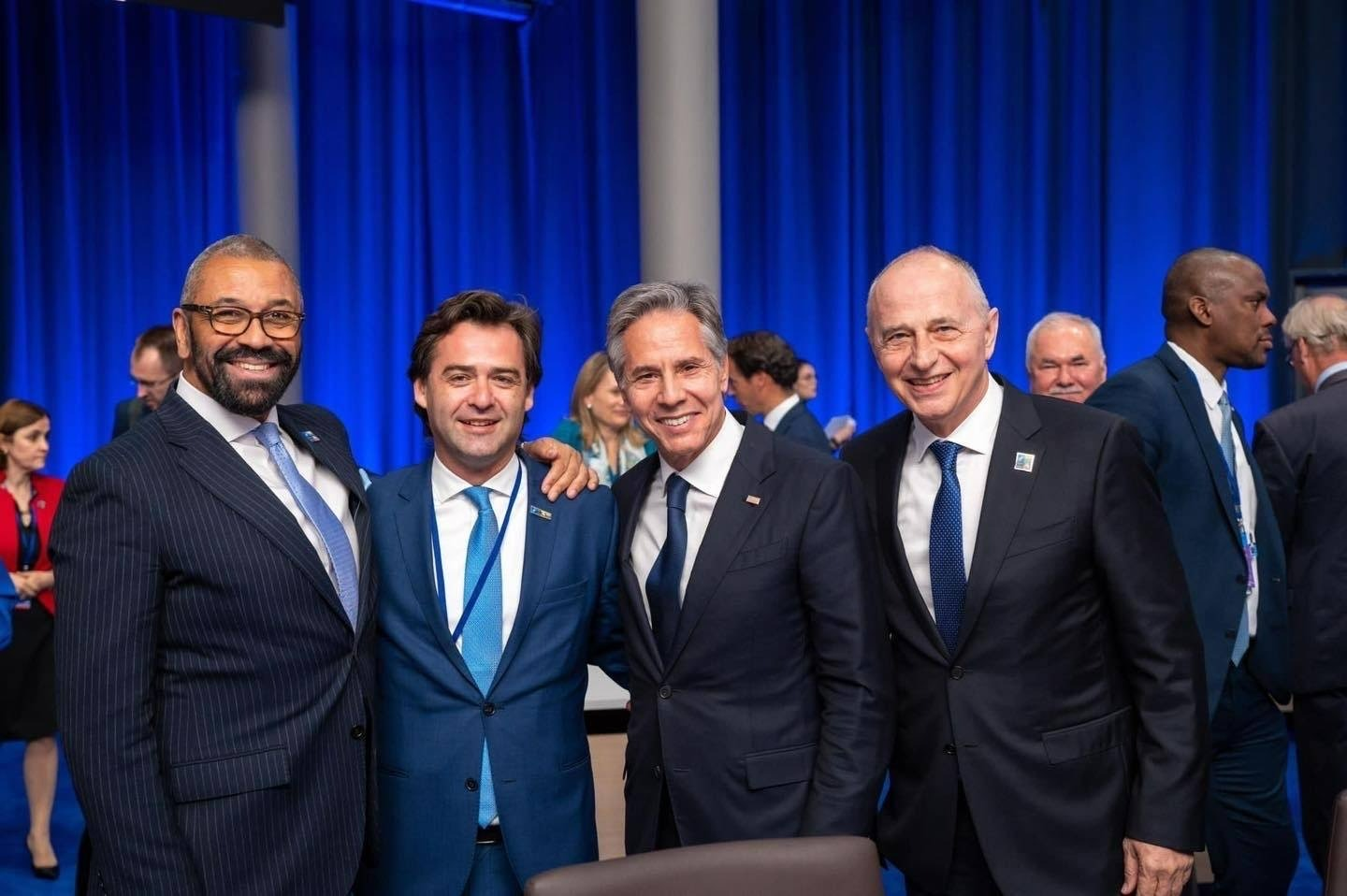
Minister Nicu Popescu at NATO Summit in Vilnius, July 2023.

Popescu played a key role in fostering alliances to support Moldova, engaging in approximately 160 meetings with counterparts from 55 states. Additionally, he conducted 76 official visits, and contributed to the Moldova Support Platform, jointly led by France, Germany, and Romania, which brought together more than 50 states and organizations.

During his mandate he played a key role in enhancing security and defence cooperation with the EU, NATO and key member states, leading to the establishment of European Union Partnership Mission Moldova in May 2023, increased military support through the European Peace Facility, and increased assistance for the modernisation of Moldova's national army from multiple partners including Romania, the US, Germany, France, Spain and others. He collaborated with International Financial Institutions (IFIs) such as the EBRD, EIB, and CEB, successfully negotiating and signing Memorandum of Understanding on cooperation with the OECD. Additionally, he focused on attracting foreign investors, diversifying export markets, and overseeing the efficient operation of Solidarity Lanes for Ukraine.

With his Romanian and Ukrainian counterparts, they launched a new trilateral format of cooperation bringing together Moldova, Romania and Ukraine. He also played an important role in achieving roaming-liberalisation agreements first with Romania (2022), then with the entire EU (2023).

As chair of the organising committee, Nicu Popescu was in charge of organising the second summit of the European Political Community, which took place in Moldova on 1 June 2023. Recognising his expertise and accomplishments, on 7 June 2023, Nicu Popescu was invited to join the esteemed Council of the European Council on Foreign Relations (ECFR). On 24 January 2024, Moldova's President Maia Sandu decorated him with the highest state distinction, Order of the Republic, praising his ‘visionary’ role in foreign policy, commitment for Moldova's European integration, and significant contributions to the opening of accession negotiations with the EU.

After securing official candidate membership status for Moldova in the EU in 2022 and securing the latter's approval to open accession negotiations with Moldova in December 2023, Popescu announced on 24 January 2024 that he was resigning from the government effective citing personal reasons.

==== Political positions regarding Romania and the Transnistria conflict ====
Nicu Popescu does not support the unification of Moldova and Romania. In an interview on November 18, 2021, for a Russian radio station, Foreign Minister Nicu Popescu stated:

The majority of the population of the Republic of Moldova does not desire unification with Romania [...] What I will say is that I am for an independent Moldova. We have such a mandate from the population. Naturally, I proceed from this mandate in my actions. [...] There were also deportations. It was a tragedy. But now we are looking toward the future. In this future, we must build a functional state. Historical issues are important, but it is very important for us to solve the problems of our citizens, of our population. We do not want to dwell on any historical issue because we have a mandate to move into the future, to improve the lives of the population. And we do not want history, which is difficult, to divide our citizens. In Moldova, of course, there are many lines of demarcation—historical, linguistic, as well as geographical. No states exist without such subjects. But we try not to approach them, so as to avoid the division of our citizens.

In 2019, during a visit to Bucharest, Nicu Popescu stated the following:

The Government in Chișinău has every interest in facilitating and easing the lives of fellow citizens who, by virtue of a civil war in '92, live in the Transnistrian region. During the conflict of 1992, we found ourselves in a regrettable state in which some citizens of the Republic of Moldova were in a state of armed conflict with other citizens of the Republic of Moldova.

He was subsequently criticized for characterizing the Transnistrian War as a "civil war," effectively downplaying Russia's influence in the conflict. He later issued a public apology:

In the context of statements expressing my disagreement with any discussion regarding the federalization of the Republic of Moldova, I used a phrase that was not entirely successful when referring to the Transnistrian conflict. The use of this phrase was a blunder—a blunder that I regret—and I hope we can move past this moment of misunderstanding.

In 2024, former Foreign Minister Tudor Ulianovschi stated that this was not an isolated incident. Indeed, in Popescu's doctoral thesis, the Transnistrian War is also presented as a "civil war":

In 1992, the Moldovan Government started a short war with the authorities in Transnistria, which resulted in the killing of approximately 1,500 people. Hostilities ended after a Russian military intervention, carried out by the then-Russian 14th Army stationed in Transnistria.

== Family ==
Popescu is married to Russian politologist Elena Gnedina and has two children.

== Bibliography ==
Books:

- EU Foreign Policy and Post-Soviet Conflicts: Stealth Intervention (Routledge, 2010)
- Democratization in EU Foreign Policy: New Member States as Drivers of Democracy Promotion, co-editor with Benedetta Berti and Kristina Mikulova, Routledge, 2015.

Selected Policy Papers

- Better firefighting: Readying Europe for an age between war and peace, ECFR Policy Paper, co-authored with Laurence Boone, November 2024.
- Hacks, Leaks and Disruption – Russian Cyber Strategies, EUISS Chaillot Paper 148, Paris 2018.
- Russia's Return to the Middle East: Building Sandcastles? co-editor, EUISS Chaillot Paper, Paris, 2018.
- Third Powers in Europe's East, co-editor, EUISS Chaillot Paper, Paris, 2018.
- China and Russia: an Eastern Partnership in the making?; co-author, EUISS Chaillot Paper 140, Paris, December 2016.
- The EU neighbours in 1995–2015: shades of grey, co-authored with Florence Gaub, EUISS Chaillot Paper, December 2015.
- Eurasian Union: the real, the imaginary and the likely, Chaillot Paper 132, September 2014, EUISS.
- Dealing with a post-BRIC Russia, ECFR Policy report, November 2011, co-authored with Ben Judah and Jana Kobzova.
- The Limits of Enlargement-lite: European and Russian Power in the Troubled Neighbourhood, ECFR Policy Report, June 2009.
- A Power Audit of EU-Russia Relations, co-authored with Mark Leonard, Policy Paper 1, European Council on Foreign Relations, November 2007.
- EU and the Eastern Neighbourhood: Reluctant Involvement in Conflict Resolution, European Foreign Affairs Review 14:4, pp. 457–477, 2009.
- Re-setting the Eastern Partnership in Moldova, Policy Brief 199, Centre for European Policy Studies, November 2009, Brussels.
- European and Russian Neighbourhood Policies Compared, co-authored with Andrew Wilson in Journal of Southeast European and Black Sea Studies, 9:3, 2009, pp. 317 – 331.
- Can the EU win the peace in Georgia? ECFR Policy Brief, 24 August 2008, Nicu Popescu, Mark Leonard and Andrew Wilson.
- Internationalizing the Georgia-Abkhazia Conflict Resolution Process: Why a Greater European Role is Needed, GMF Policy Brief; Ron Asmus, Svante E. Cornell, Antje Herrberg, and Nicu Popescu, June 2008.
