= Lilia Dabija =

Moldovan politician (born 1982)

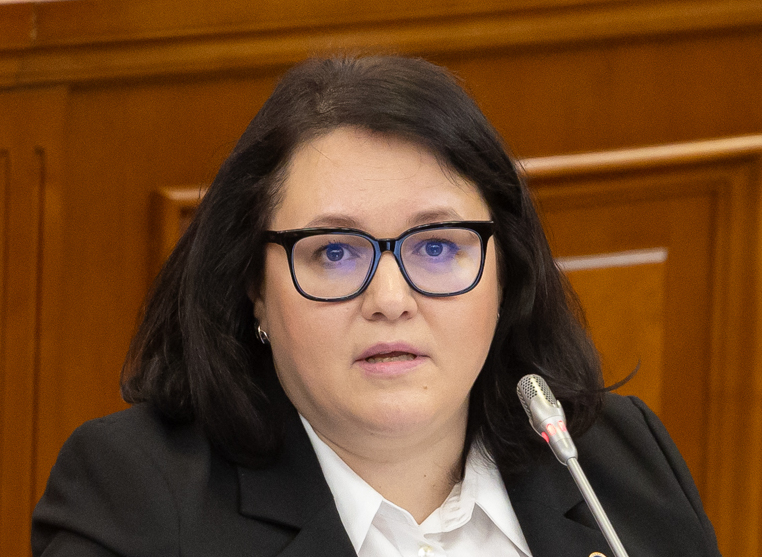
- Dabija in 2024

Deputy Secretary General of the Government of Moldova
- In office 27 December 2023 – 7 November 2025
- President: Maia Sandu
- Prime Minister: Dorin Recean; Alexandru Munteanu
- Succeeded by: Alexandru Iacub

Secretary General of the Ministry of Infrastructure and Regional Development
- In office 17 July 2023 – 19 July 2023
- President: Maia Sandu
- Prime Minister: Dorin Recean
- Minister: Andrei Spînu
- Preceded by: Angela Țurcanu
- Succeeded by: Angela Țurcanu
- In office 8 December 2021 – 16 February 2023
- President: Maia Sandu
- Prime Minister: Natalia Gavrilița
- Minister: Andrei Spînu
- Succeeded by: Angela Țurcanu

Minister of Infrastructure and Regional Development
- In office 16 February 2023 – 14 July 2023
- President: Maia Sandu
- Prime Minister: Dorin Recean
- Preceded by: Andrei Spînu
- Succeeded by: Andrei Spînu

Personal details
- Born: 17 October 1982 (age 43) Chișinău, Moldavian SSR, Soviet Union

Lilia Dabija (born 17 October 1982) is a Moldovan jurist. She served as the Minister of Infrastructure and Regional Development in the Recean Cabinet.
