= Cristina Gherasimov =

Moldovan politician (born 1984)

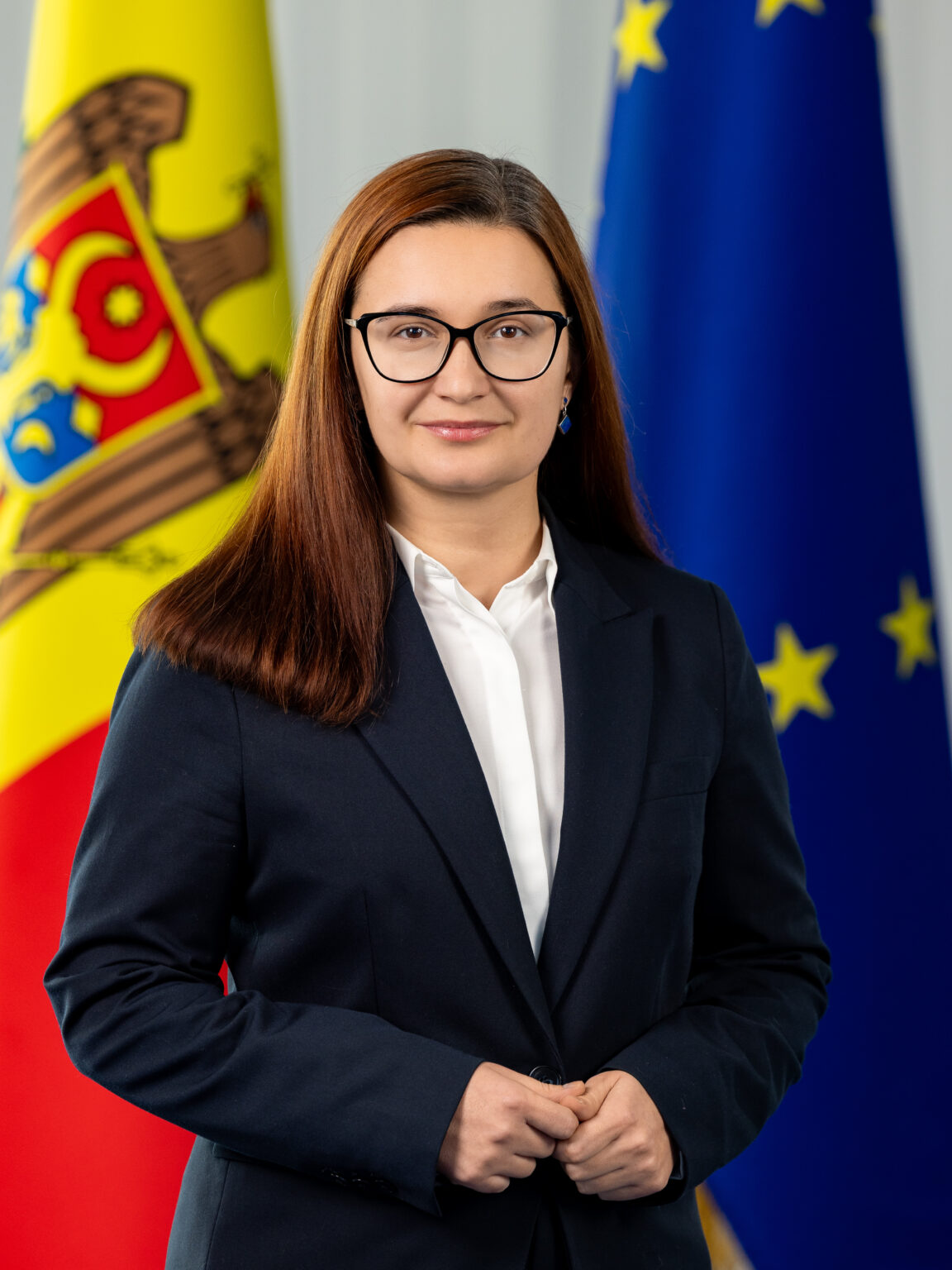
- Official portrait, 2025

Deputy Prime Minister of Moldova for European Integration
- Incumbent
- Assumed office 5 February 2024
- President: Maia Sandu
- Prime Minister: Dorin Recean; Alexandru Munteanu; Eugen Osmochescu (acting); Vasile Tofan
- Preceded by: Iurie Leancă (2019)

Secretary of State of the Ministry of Foreign Affairs and European Integration
- In office 22 November 2023 – 5 February 2024
- President: Maia Sandu
- Prime Minister: Dorin Recean
- Minister: Nicu Popescu; Mihai Popșoi

Foreign Policy Advisor to the President
- In office 10 January 2023 – 27 December 2023
- President: Maia Sandu
- Succeeded by: Olga Roșca
- In office 4 January 2021 – 8 October 2021
- President: Maia Sandu
- Preceded by: Aureliu Ciocoi

Secretary General of the Office of the President of Moldova
- In office 8 October 2021 – 10 January 2023
- President: Maia Sandu
- Preceded by: Andrei Spînu
- Succeeded by: Veaceslav Negruța

Personal details
- Born: 29 January 1984 (age 42) Chișinău, Moldavian SSR, Soviet Union
- Education: Moldova State University; European Institute; University of Wrocław; Rutgers University

Cristina Gherasimov (born 29 January 1984) is a Moldovan politician. She currently serves as Deputy Prime Minister for European Integration of Moldova in the Tofan Cabinet.

As part of her role, she leads the talks for Accession of Moldova to the European Union and hope the negotiation framework set out by the European Commission will enable to speed up the domestic reform agenda for a quicker accession.

== Early life ==
Gherasimov was born on 29 January 1984. From 2002 to 2007 she studied at the Moldova State University in Chișinău, graduating from the Faculty of International Relations. While studying she had an exchange program for a year at Hamilton College in New York. From 2008 to 2009 she then attended the European Institute for Advanced International Studies, receiving her master's degree before going to the University of Wroclaw. From 2009 to 2011, she then studied at Wroclaw, graduating with her second master's in international relations. She then studied for her PhD in political science from Rutgers University, where she was simultaneously a lecturer in international relations and European politics from 2013 to 2016.

After graduating she worked as a research fellow at the Chatham House, specializing in the Russia and Eurasia Program, before becoming a research fellow at the Robert Bosch Center for Central and Eastern Europe, Russia, and Central Asia until 2020.

== Political career ==
Before becoming minister, she was state secretary at the Ministry of Foreign Affairs. In 2024 she became Deputy Prime Minister of European Affairs and European Integration in Dorin Recean's government.
