= Ana Revenco =

Moldovan politician (born 1977)

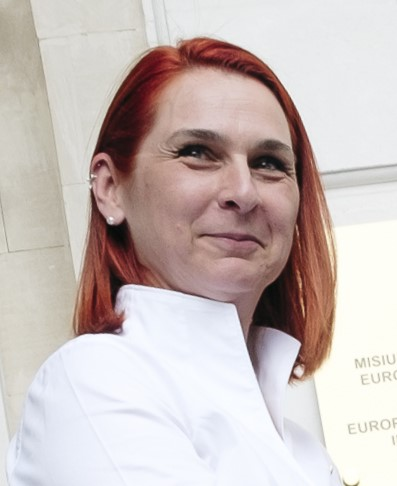
- Revenco in 2023

Minister of Internal Affairs
- In office 6 August 2021 – 14 July 2023
- President: Maia Sandu
- Prime Minister: Natalia Gavrilița; Dorin Recean
- Preceded by: Pavel Voicu
- Succeeded by: Adrian Efros

Defense and National Security Advisor to the President – Secretary of the Supreme Security Council
- In office 21 January 2021 – 2 September 2021
- President: Maia Sandu
- Preceded by: Victor Gaiciuc
- Succeeded by: Dorin Recean

Personal details
- Born: 21 May 1977 (age 49) Chișinău, Moldavian SSR, Soviet Union
- Education: Academy of Economic Studies of Moldova

Ana Revenco (pronunciation: [reˈveŋko]; born 21 May 1977) is a Moldovan politician. She served as Minister of Internal Affairs in the cabinets of Prime Ministers Natalia Gavrilița and Dorin Recean.

== Early life and education ==
She was born on 21 May 1977 in Chisinau. In 1994, she entered the Faculty of International Economic Relations of the Academy of Economic Studies of Moldova in Chisinau, graduating in 1999 with a degree in international economic relations. In 2002-2003, she completed an alternative professional training program at CReDO, a non-profit organization for human rights and democratization of civil society, and received a master's degree in NGO management. In 2014, she completed training under the international Visitor Leadership program of the Justice and Law Department of the United States Department of State. She speaks Romanian, English and Russian.

== Career ==
Between 1997 and 2000, Revenco served as a public relations assistant for the Moldovan government’s pilot land reform initiative, Land, a project implemented in collaboration with USAID. The project aimed to restructure 72 collective farms in Moldova's agricultural sector and was executed by the American consulting firm Booz Allen Hamilton. In 2001, she established the Moldovan branch of the International Center "La Strada," an organization dedicated to combating human trafficking. Revenco served as Executive Director from 2001 to 2012 and again from 2015 to 2020. Between 2009 and 2011, she was also a board member and president of the La Strada Association. From 2010 to 2012, she was a member of the National Participation Council, an advisory body to the Prime Minister composed of representatives from civil society organizations. Between 2012 and 2015, Revenco served as Director of the Center for Combating Trafficking in Human Beings under the General Police Inspectorate of the Ministry of Internal Affairs.

On 21 January 2021, Revenco was appointed national security advisor to President Maia Sandu and Secretary of the Supreme Security Council. She was first proposed for the position of Minister of Internal Affairs on 5 February 2021, by Prime Minister-designate Natalia Gavrilița, and was re-nominated on 3 August 2021. The Parliament confirmed the Gavrilița cabinet on 6 August 2021. Revenco held the position until her resignation on 14 July 2023. On 16 October 2023, President Sandu proposed Revenco as Director of the newly established Center for Strategic Communications and Combating Disinformation. The Parliament approved her appointment on 19 October 2023, and the center officially began operations in April 2024.

Political offices
Preceded by Pavel Voicu	Minister of Internal Affairs; 2021–2023	Succeeded by Adrian Efros
