= Ministry of Infrastructure and Regional Development (Moldova) =

Government ministry of Moldova

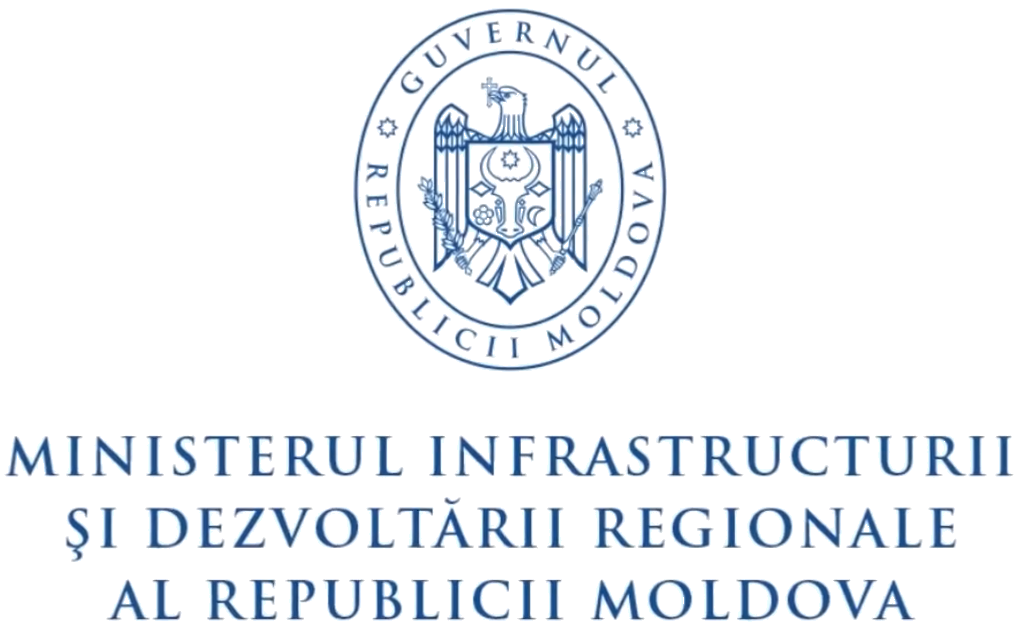

Ministry overview
- Formed: 24 January 1997; 29 years ago (as Ministry of Territorial Development, Construction and Public Works )
- Jurisdiction: Government of Moldova
- Headquarters: Government House, Chișinău
- Minister responsible: Vladimir Bolea, Deputy Prime Minister, Minister of Infrastructure and Regional Development
- Ministry executives: Angela Țurcanu, Secretary General; Denis Lungul, Secretary of State for Regional Development; Mircea Păscăluță, Secretary of State for Transport; Veaceslav Șipitca, Secretary of State for Urbanism, Construction and Housing; Nicolae Mîndra, Secretary of State for Roads Infrastructure
- Website: midr.gov.md

The Ministry of Infrastructure and Regional Development (Romanian: Ministerul Infrastructurii și Dezvoltării Regionale) is one of the fourteen ministries of the Government of Moldova.

== History ==
Ministry of Infrastructure and Regional Development was founded on 24 January 1997, as part of First Ciubuc Cabinet. Over years, it was restructured a few times and renamed, as follows:

- Ministry of Environment, Public Works and Regional Development (2001–2004)
- Ministry of Industry and Infrastructure (2004–2008)
- Ministry of Construction and Regional Development (2008–2011)
- Ministry of Infrastructure and Regional Development (2021–present)

In 2017 as part of the government reform in Moldova, the Ministry of Economy was renamed to Ministry of Economy and Infrastructure, absorbing the Ministry of Transport and Roads Infrastructure, and the Ministry of Information Technology and Communications, becoming their legal successor. Also this ministry took the domain of constructions from the former Minister of Construction and Regional Development.

== List of ministers ==
No.	Portrait	Name (Birth–Death)	Office term		Notes	Cabinet
1		Mihai Severovan (born 1947)	24 January 1997	21 December 1999		Ciubuc I–II; Sturza
2		Vladimir Antosii (born 1951)	19 April 2005	31 March 2008		Tarlev II
3		Vladimir Baldovici (born 1967)	31 March 2008	11 September 2009		Greceanîi I–II
4		Marcel Răducan (born 1967)	25 September 2009	18 February 2015		Filat I–II; Leancă
5		Vasile Bîtca (born 1971)	18 February 2015	26 July 2017		Gaburici; Streleț; Filip
6		Andrei Spînu (born 1986)	6 August 2021	16 February 2023	Deputy Prime Minister	Gavrilița
7		Lilia Dabija (born 1982)	16 February 2023	14 July 2023		Recean
8		Andrei Spînu (born 1986)	17 July 2023	11 November 2024		Recean
9		Vladimir Bolea (born 1971)	19 November 2024	Incumbent	Deputy Prime Minister	Recean Munteanu Tofan
