= Roman Roșca =

Moldovan jurist and politician

Roman Roșca MP
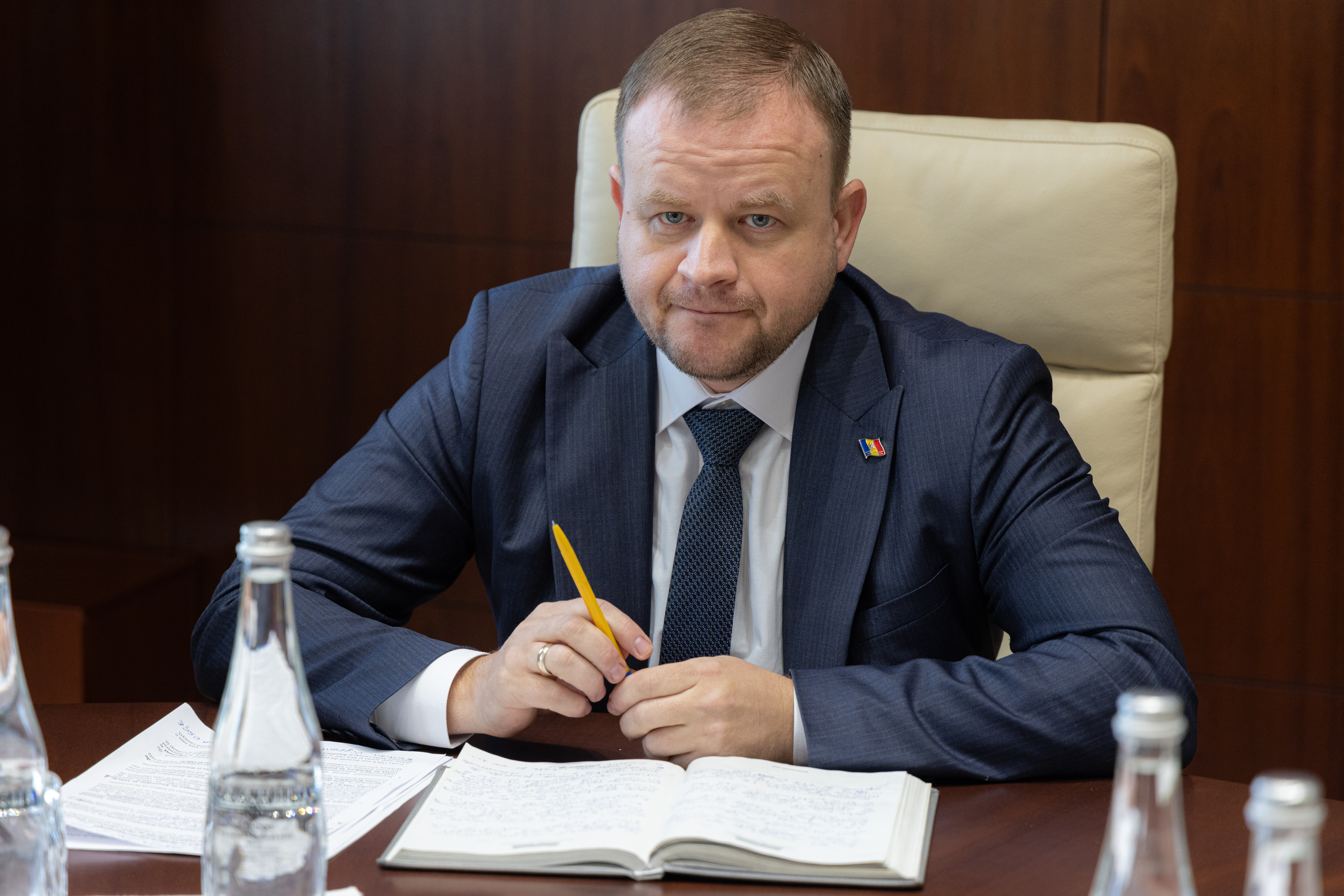
- Roșca in 2024

Member of the Moldovan Parliament
- Incumbent
- Assumed office 6 August 2026
- Preceded by: Alexandr Trubca
- Parliamentary group: Party of Action and Solidarity
- In office 15 July 2022 – 23 July 2025
- Preceded by: Dorel Iurcu
- Parliamentary group: Party of Action and Solidarity

Deputy Prime Minister of Moldova for Reintegration
- In office 23 July 2025 – 1 November 2025
- President: Maia Sandu
- Prime Minister: Dorin Recean
- Preceded by: Oleg Serebrian
- Succeeded by: Valeriu Chiveri

Member of the Chișinău Municipal Council
- In office 20 October 2019 – 15 July 2022

Personal details
- Born: 3 April 1982 (age 44) Bender, Moldavian SSR, Soviet Union (now Transnistria)
- Education: Moldova State University

Roman Roșca (born 3 April 1982) is a Moldovan jurist and politician.
