= Carabetovca =

- Village
- Location in Moldova
- Coordinates: 46°25′N 28°55′E
- Country: Moldova
- District: Basarabeasca District

Population (2014 census)
  - Total: 1,660
- Time zone: UTC+2 (EET)
  - Summer (DST): UTC+3 (EEST)

Carabetovca is a village in Basarabeasca District, Moldova.
