= Oleg Serebrian =

Moldovan diplomat and politician (born 1969)

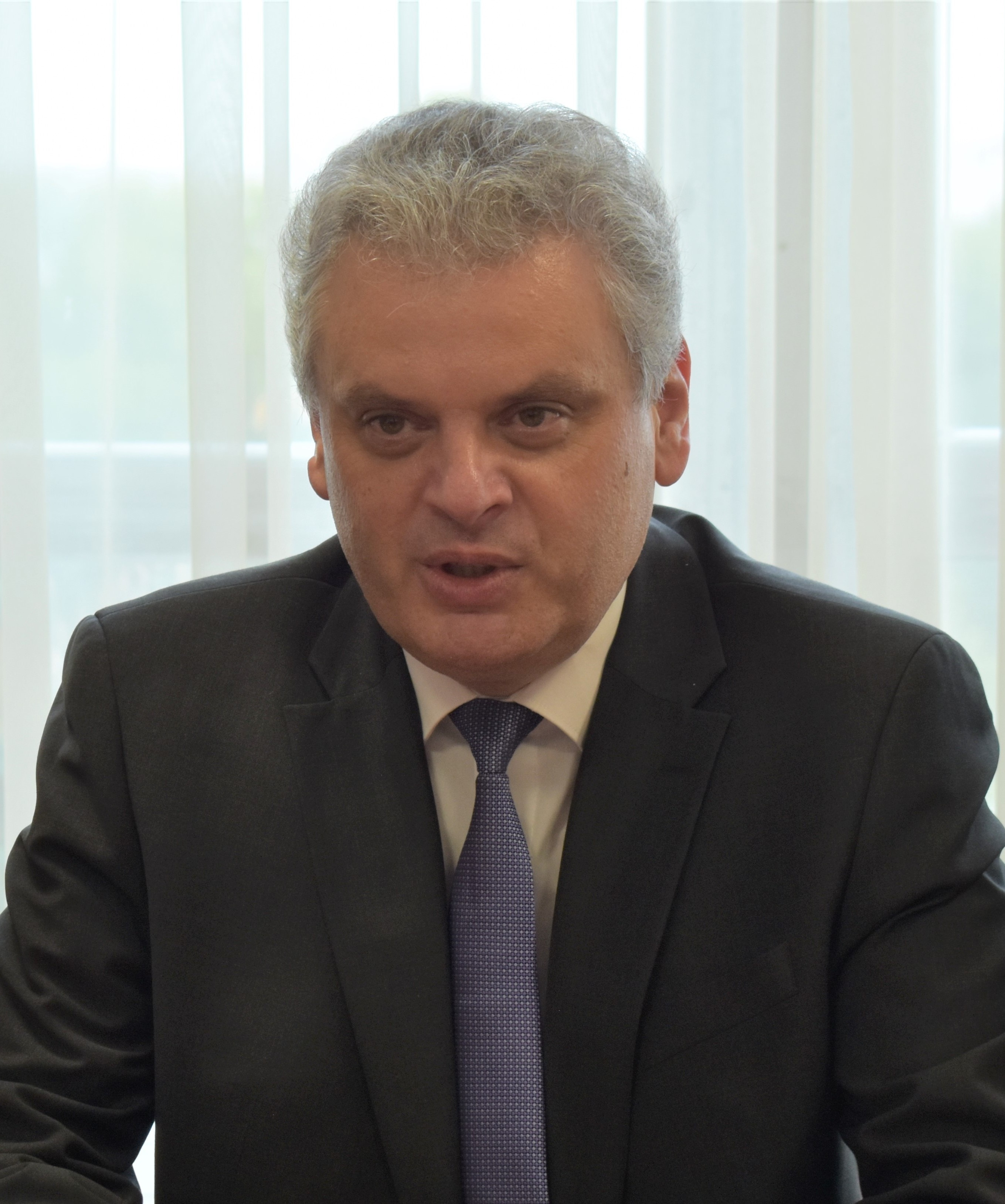
- Serebrian in 2024

Moldovan Ambassador to Turkey, Lebanon, Egypt and Jordan
- Incumbent
- Assumed office 30 June 2025
- President: Maia Sandu
- Prime Minister: Dorin Recean; Alexandru Munteanu; Eugen Osmochescu (acting); Vasile Tofan
- Preceded by: Dumitru Croitor

Deputy Prime Minister of Moldova for Reintegration
- In office 19 January 2022 – 30 June 2025
- President: Maia Sandu
- Prime Minister: Natalia Gavrilița; Dorin Recean
- Preceded by: Vladislav Kulminski
- Succeeded by: Roman Roșca

Moldovan Ambassador to Germany and Denmark
- In office 5 November 2015 – 20 December 2021
- President: Nicolae Timofti; Igor Dodon; Maia Sandu
- Prime Minister: Gheorghe Brega (acting); Pavel Filip; Maia Sandu; Ion Chicu; Aureliu Ciocoi (acting); Natalia Gavrilița
- Preceded by: Aureliu Ciocoi
- Succeeded by: Aureliu Ciocoi

Moldovan Ambassador to France and Monaco
- In office 21 June 2010 – 16 June 2015
- President: Mihai Ghimpu (acting); Vlad Filat (acting); Marian Lupu (acting); Nicolae Timofti
- Prime Minister: Vlad Filat; Iurie Leancă; Chiril Gaburici
- Preceded by: Victoria Iftodi
- Succeeded by: Lilian Moraru

Member of the Moldovan Parliament
- In office 14 August 2009 – 16 July 2010
- Succeeded by: Vladimir Rotaru
- Parliamentary group: Democratic Party
- In office 17 March 2005 – 22 April 2009
- Parliamentary group: Democratic Moldova Electoral Bloc; Democratic Party

Personal details
- Born: 13 July 1969 (age 57) Hădărăuți, Moldavian SSR, Soviet Union
- Spouse: Snejana Serebrian
- Education: Ion Creangă State Pedagogical University; European Institute
- Profession: Diplomat

Oleg Serebrian (born 13 July 1969) is a Moldovan politician, writer, diplomat and political scientist, President of the Latin Union between 2010 and 2012. He served as Deputy Prime Minister for Reintegration of Moldova from 2022 to 2025 and is currently the Moldovan Ambassador to Turkey.

== Biography ==
He studied law and history at the Ion Creangă State Pedagogical University in Chișinău and international relations at the European Institute of High International Studies in Nice, France. Serebrian entered the Ministry of Foreign Affairs of Moldova in 1992. In 1998 he was awarded his doctorate in political sciences. In 1998-1999 he served as spokesperson of Moldova's Ministry of Foreign Affairs. Between 1999 and 2003, he was Deputy Rector of the Free University of Moldova.

Between May 2001 and February 2008 Serebrian was Chairman of the Social Liberal Party. On 10 February 2008, after merging of Social Liberal Party with Democratic Party of Moldova (DPM) he was elected First Deputy Chairman of DPM. Between March 2005 and July 2010 he was Member of the Parliament of Moldova (reelected for a second term in 2009).

Between July 2010 and July 2015 he was Ambassador of Moldova to France and UNESCO. From November 2015 to January 2022 he was the Moldovan Ambassador to Germany.

He is the author of several books on international affairs and geopolitics.

Since 19 January 2022, Serebrian is the Deputy Prime Minister for Reintegration of the Republic of Moldova.

== Major works ==
- Geopolitica spațiului pontic (Geopolitics of the Black Sea Region, 1998)
- Politosfera (Politosphere, 2001)
- Dicționar de geopolitică (Dictionary of Geopolitics, 2006)
- Despre geopolitică (About Geopolitics, 2009)
- Cântecul mării (Song of the Sea, 2011), novel
- Rusia la răspântie (Russia at the crossroads, 2014)
- Woldemar (2018), novel
- Pe contrasens (In the opposite direction, 2021), novel
