= Vladimir Bolea =

Moldovan politician (born 1971)

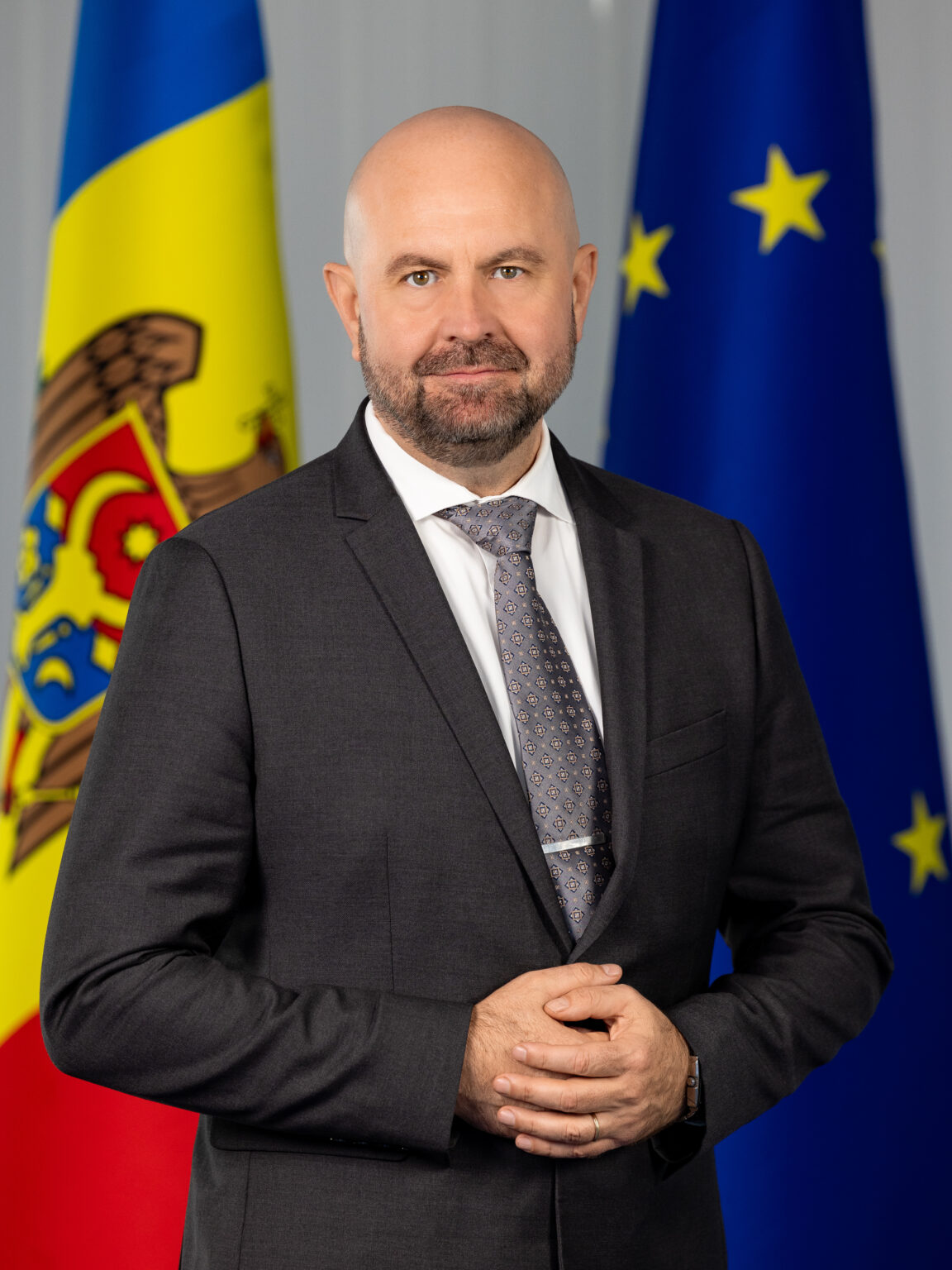
- Official portrait, 2025

Deputy Prime Minister of Moldova
- Incumbent
- Assumed office 16 February 2023 Serving with: Mihai Popșoi
- President: Maia Sandu
- Prime Minister: Dorin Recean; Alexandru Munteanu; Eugen Osmochescu (acting); Vasile Tofan
- Preceded by: Andrei Spînu

Minister of Infrastructure and Regional Development
- Incumbent
- Assumed office 19 November 2024
- President: Maia Sandu
- Prime Minister: Dorin Recean; Alexandru Munteanu; Eugen Osmochescu (acting); Vasile Tofan
- Preceded by: Andrei Spînu

Member of the Moldovan Parliament
- In office 22 October 2025 – 1 November 2025
- Succeeded by: Veronica Briceag
- Parliamentary group: Party of Action and Solidarity
- In office 9 March 2019 – 29 July 2022
- Succeeded by: Vasile Porțevschi
- Parliamentary group: Party of Action and Solidarity
- Constituency: Chișinău
- Majority: 11,058 (41.5%)

Minister of Agriculture and Food Industry
- In office 8 July 2022 – 19 November 2024
- President: Maia Sandu
- Prime Minister: Natalia Gavrilița; Dorin Recean
- Preceded by: Viorel Gherciu
- Succeeded by: Ludmila Catlabuga

Acting Minister of Environment
- In office 7 October 2022 – 16 November 2022
- President: Maia Sandu
- Prime Minister: Natalia Gavrilița
- Preceded by: Iuliana Cantaragiu
- Succeeded by: Rodica Iordanov

Personal details
- Born: 23 September 1971 (age 54) Carabetovca, Moldavian SSR, Soviet Union
- Party: Party of Action and Solidarity
- Education: Moldova State University

Vladimir Bolea (born 23 September 1971) is a Moldovan politician and meritocrat currently serving as Deputy Prime Minister and Minister of Infrastructure and Regional Development in the Tofan Cabinet.

== Early life ==
Bolea was born on 23 September 1971 in Carabetovca, then part of the Moldavian SSR. From 1989 to 1991 he studied at the Leningrad Higher Military Political School of Air Defense in the Russian SFSR. Returning to Moldova, from 1991 to 1997 he then studied at the State University of Moldova for a license in history, while at the same time completing his license in law from 1994 to 1997. He started working in 2001 as director of S.C. PATIPTODCOM S.R.L. in Chișinău, which he served as director of until 2015. From 2001 to 2002 he returned to the State University of Moldova, receiving his Master's degree's in economic law. Meanwhile, he was also an instructor in economics at the School of Advanced Studies in Journalism from 2012 to 2019, and Director of SC GFC HOLBOCA SRL from 2013 to 2019.

== Political career ==
Bolea joined the Party of Action and Solidarity in 2019. He ran in the 2019 Moldovan parliamentary election as a representative of the political alliance NOW Platform DA and PAS in Constituency No. 27, defeating Radu Mudreac by around 7% percent. After serving as Chairman of the Parliamentary Committee on Agriculture, he was chosen as Agriculture Minister by Maia Sandu, and was sworn in on 8 July 2022, replacing Viorel Gherciu. In November 2024 it was announced that he would leave the position as Minister of Agriculture to take over the Minister of Infrastructure and Regional Development, a position that had remained vacant since Andrei Spînu's resignation.
