= Dorin Recean =

Prime Minister of Moldova from 2023 to 2025

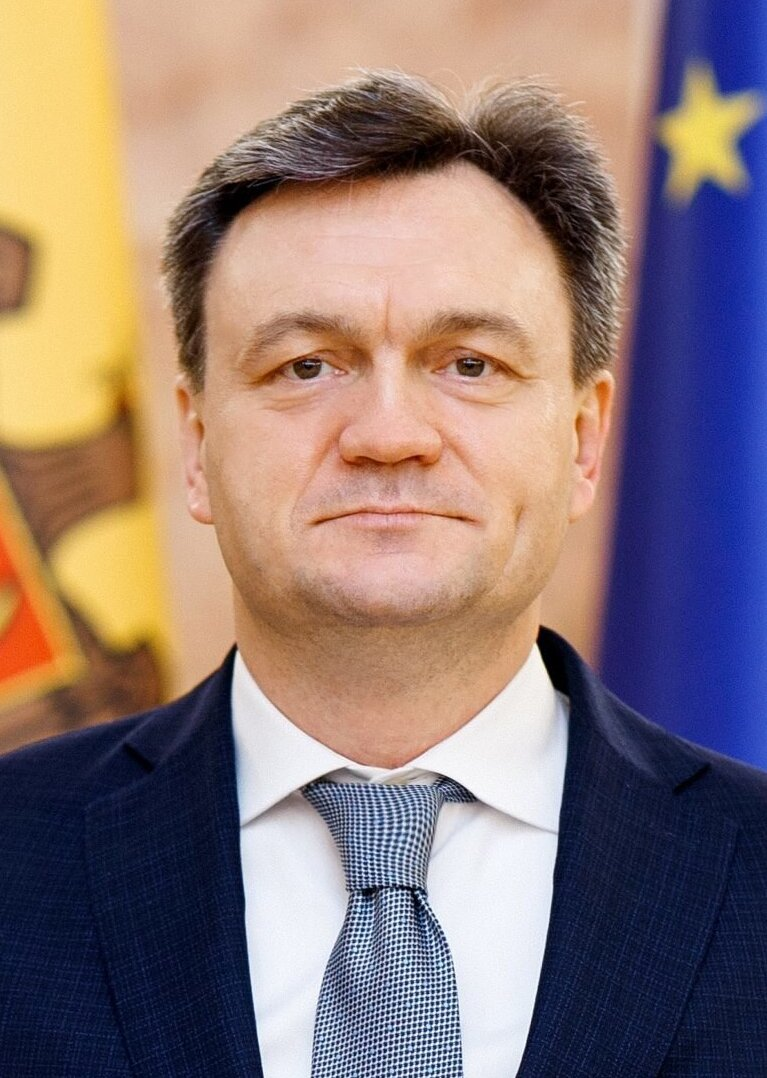
- Official portrait, 2023

Special Envoy for Development and Resilience
- Incumbent
- Assumed office 10 December 2025
- President: Maia Sandu

16th Prime Minister of Moldova
- In office 16 February 2023 – 1 November 2025
- President: Maia Sandu
- Deputy: See list: Nicu Popescu Dumitru Alaiba Vladimir Bolea Oleg Serebrian Mihai Popșoi Cristina Gherasimov Doina Nistor Roman Roșca
- Preceded by: Natalia Gavrilița
- Succeeded by: Alexandru Munteanu

Member of the Moldovan Parliament
- In office 22 October 2025 – 1 November 2025
- Succeeded by: Igor Talmazan
- Parliamentary group: Party of Action and Solidarity

Defense and National Security Advisor to the President – Secretary of the Supreme Security Council
- In office 7 February 2022 – 16 February 2023
- President: Maia Sandu
- Preceded by: Ana Revenco
- Succeeded by: Stanislav Secrieru

Minister of Internal Affairs
- In office 24 July 2012 – 18 February 2015
- President: Nicolae Timofti
- Prime Minister: Vlad Filat; Iurie Leancă
- Preceded by: Alexei Roibu
- Succeeded by: Oleg Balan

Deputy Minister of Information Technology and Communications
- In office 29 January 2010 – 24 July 2012
- President: Mihai Ghimpu (acting); Vlad Filat (acting); Marian Lupu (acting); Nicolae Timofti
- Prime Minister: Vlad Filat
- Minister: Alexandru Oleinic; Pavel Filip

Personal details
- Born: 17 March 1974 (age 52) Dondușeni, Moldavian SSR, Soviet Union (now Moldova)
- Citizenship: Moldova; Romania
- Party: Independent
- Other political affiliations: Party of Action and Solidarity (2025)
- Spouse: Stella Recean
- Children: 2
- Education: Academy of Economic Studies of Moldova (BA); Newport International University (MBA)
- Occupation: Politician; professor; businessman

Dorin Recean (born 17 March 1974) is a Moldovan economist and politician, who served as Prime Minister of Moldova from February 2023 to November 2025. Since 2022 he has also served as Presidential Advisor on Defense and National Security, and Secretary of Moldova's Supreme Security Council. He previously served as Minister of Internal Affairs of Moldova from July 2012 to February 2015. He has extensive experience in the private sector and in the IT industry with a specialisation in data, including big data, and information analysis. He also worked in development institutions and was previously a lecturer at several universities.

He is considered to be pro-Western and a strong supporter of the accession of Moldova to the European Union. He has opposed and criticised Russia's involvement in the Russo-Ukrainian war and supported subsequent steps to reduce Moldova's economic dependence on Russia, expressing his sympathy and support for Ukraine in the conflict. He has argued for increased military cooperation between Moldova and NATO.

== Early life and education ==
Recean was born in Dondușeni in the Soviet Union on 17 March 1974. He later moved with his family in Mîndîc village, Drochia district. In 1996, he graduated from the Academy of Economic Studies of Moldova with a Bachelor's degree in International Business Management. In 2000, Dorin Recean graduated with a Master's degree in Business Administration from Newport International University's Belgium branch.

== Career ==
=== Academia ===
Dorin Recean started his career as a lecturer in 1995 at his alma mater, the Academy of Economic Studies, and continued teaching there until 2007. From 2002 to 2010 he also worked in different private companies in various capacities. He also taught at the Chișinău-based Newport International University from 2000 to 2010.

=== Politics ===
In January 2010, Dorin Recean was appointed Deputy Minister of Information and Communication Technology, where he was responsible for implementing new secure documents, including the biometric passport, as part of the visa-liberalization action plan. He has been a member of the Governmental Task Force on Visa-liberalization with the EU.

In July 2012, he was appointed as Interior Minister in the Cabinet led by Vlad Filat, replacing Alexei Roibu. On 31 May 2013 Recean was reappointed as Interior Minister in the Cabinet led by Prime Minister Iurie Leancă.

Immediately after the November 2014 elections, Recean announced his retirement from politics and that he would pursue a private business career in Fintech. He promoted IT technologies in the field of mobile remittances and payments with the aim of broadening the access of migrant workers and their relatives to secure and affordable money transfers and payments.

On 7 February 2022 he was appointed by President Maia Sandu as Presidential Advisor on Security Issues and Secretary General of the Supreme Security Council.

On 26 September 2022 Recean said that "Moldova can no longer rely exclusively on foreign policy instruments, one of which is its neutral status, to ensure state stability," adding that "Moldova must start working on increasing its defence potential... The authorities need to obtain the conscious support of citizens who should understand that it is critical for the state's survival", calling for funds to be allocated to the task.

=== Premiership ===
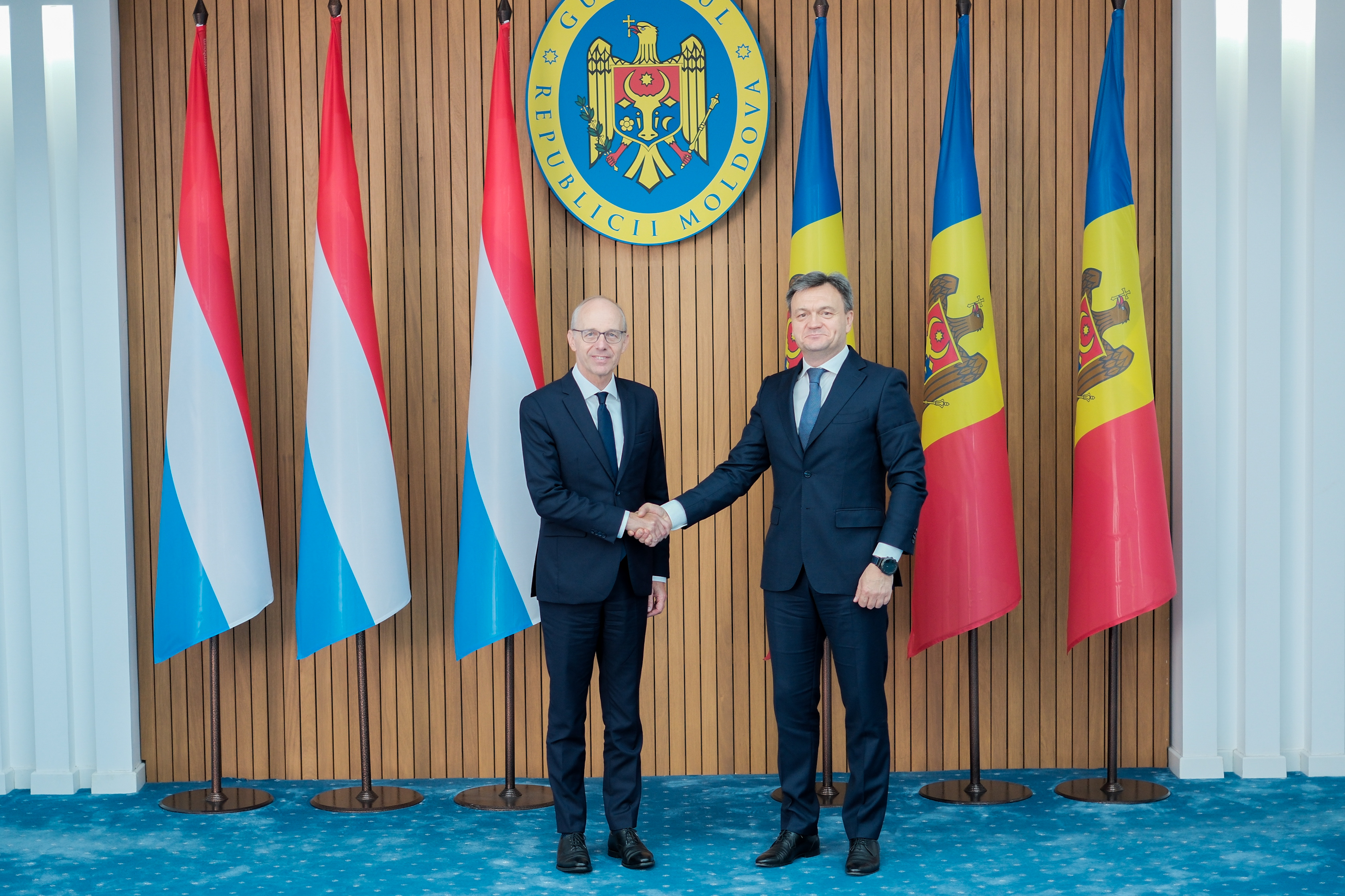
Recean with Prime Minister of Luxembourg Luc Frieden in Chișinău, 13 September 2024

In February 2023, Dorin Recean was appointed Prime Minister of Moldova by President Maia Sandu, following the resignation of Prime Minister Natalia Gavrilița. He was sworn in on 16 February 2023. Since being sworn in, Recean has continued to pursue Moldova's accession to the European Union.

On 1 March, during the meeting with the Romanian Prime Minister Nicolae Ciucă and President Klaus Iohannis, both countries pledged to boost economic ties following Russia's invasion of Ukraine. Romania reiterated its support for Moldova's accession to the European Union.

On 14 March Recean announced that Moldova had reached an agreement with the International Monetary Fund on a new $94 million tranche under the existing lending program as part of a larger $800 million fund agreed with the IMF in 2022 to help Moldova deal with the impact of Russia's invasion of Ukraine.

On 24 March, Moldova and the European Free Trade Association announced that it had reached an agreement on a comprehensive free trade agreement, after two years of negotiations, allowing Moldova to export goods without paying customs tariffs to the other members. The agreement was signed in Vaduz, the capital of Liechstenstein. At the summit in Switzerland, Recean met with representatives of Liechstenstein, Switzerland, Iceland, and the representatives of Google.

On 6 April he thanked the Prime Minister of Poland, Mateusz Morawiecki, for expressing his government's support for an accelerated pathway for Moldova's accession to the European Union.

On 18 May Recean announced at a security conference in Bucharest that Moldova was no longer using Russian gas or electricity, following the Russian invasion of Ukraine, stating that "Moldova is integrated in the European energy network both technically and commercially."

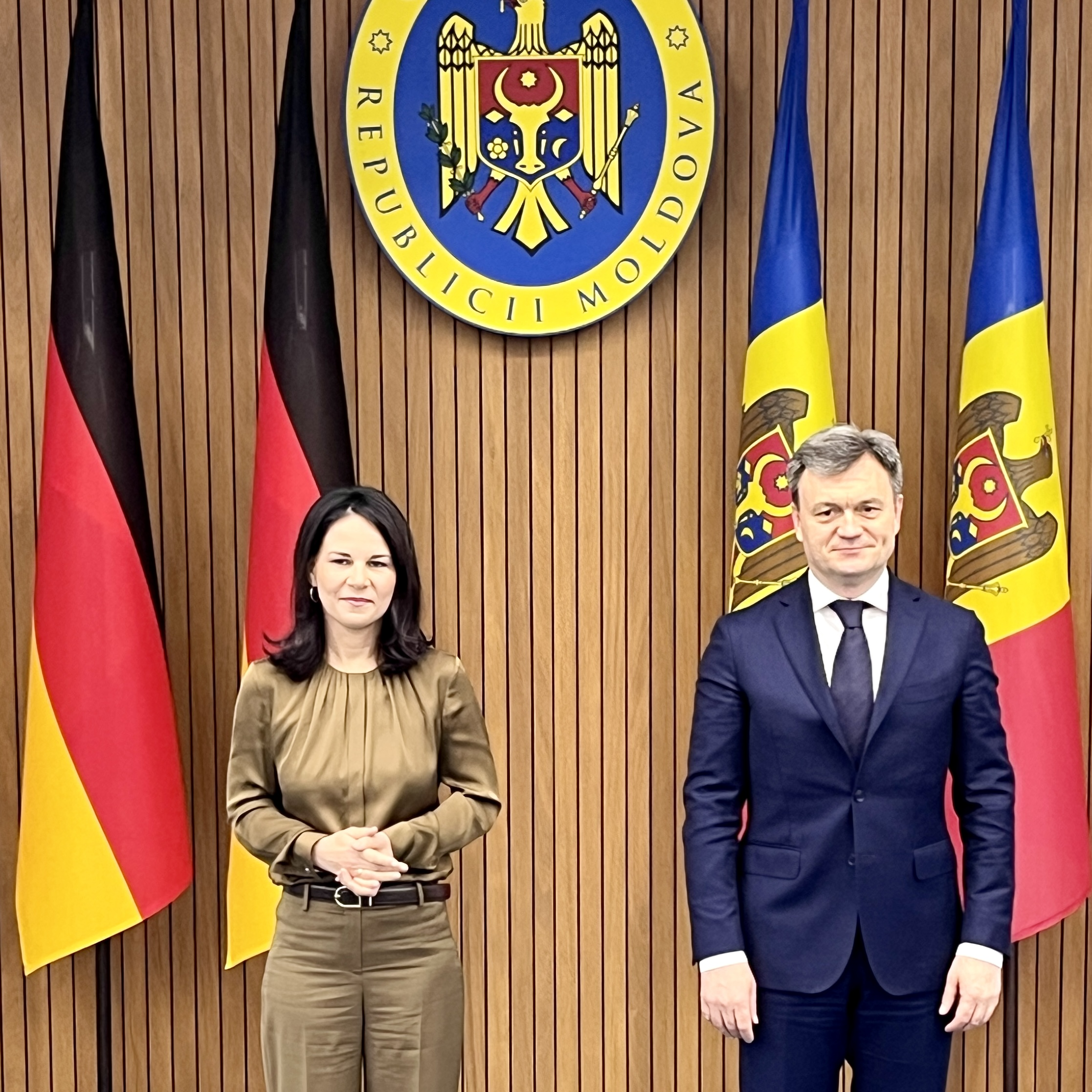
Recean with Germany‘s Minister of Foreign Affairs Annalena Baerbock in Chișinău, 2 April 2025

On 26 June he commented that the aborted Wagner rebellion in Russia "is a clear indication of the weakness of the Russian leadership and the Russian management of the army" and that "Russia is much weaker than people perceived it to be". He also stated in regards to the Transnistrian conflict that "first of all Moldova will solve this Transdniestria issue peacefully". "This is fundamental. The first thing is to demilitarise the region where Russian troops are stationed illegally. This will most likely happen when Russians are pushed out of Ukraine."

== Political views ==
Recean supports Moldova's membership to the EU and closer ties with the West. Right after his official nomination, Recean declared: "The new government will have three priorities: order and discipline, revitalizing economy, and peace and stability. The new government will continue the implementation of Moldova's strategic course – integration to the European Union."

== Personal life ==
Recean and his wife, Stella, have two children. He speaks English, French, and Russian in addition to his native Romanian.

Recean also holds Romanian citizenship and self-identifies as an ethnic Romanian.

== Honours ==
=== Foreign honours ===
Ribbon	Country	Honour	Year	Ref
	Ukraine	Order of Prince Yaroslav the Wise	2025	

Political offices
Preceded by Alexei Roibu	Minister of Internal Affairs; 2012–2015	Succeeded by Oleg Balan
Preceded by Natalia Gavrilița	Prime Minister of Moldova; 2023–2025	Succeeded by Alexandru Munteanu
