= Natalia Gavrilița =

Prime Minister of Moldova from 2021 to 2023

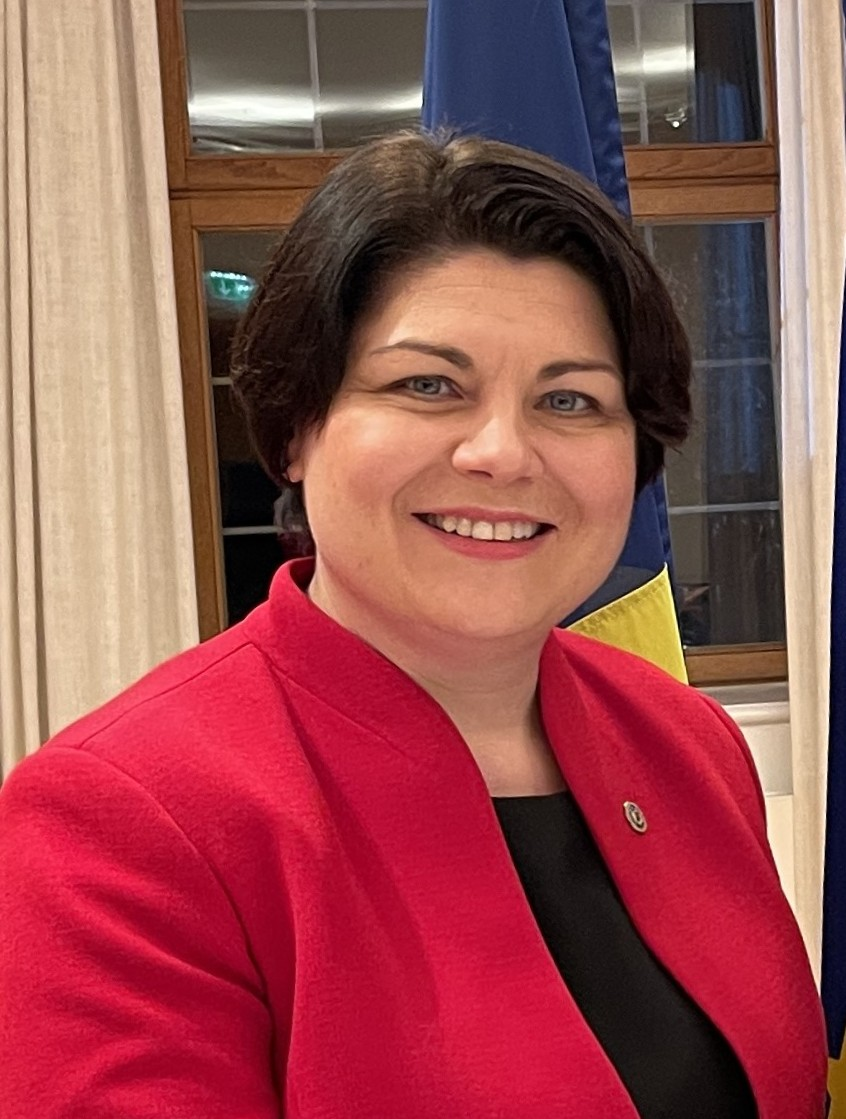
- Gavrilița in 2023

15th Prime Minister of Moldova
- In office 6 August 2021 – 16 February 2023
- President: Maia Sandu
- Deputy: See list: Nicu Popescu Andrei Spînu Vladislav Kulminski Iurie Țurcanu Oleg Serebrian
- Preceded by: Aureliu Ciocoi (acting)
- Succeeded by: Dorin Recean

Member of the Moldovan Parliament
- In office 23 July 2021 – 8 September 2021
- Succeeded by: Ana Calinici
- Parliamentary group: Party of Action and Solidarity

Minister of Finance
- In office 8 June 2019 – 14 November 2019
- President: Igor Dodon
- Prime Minister: Maia Sandu
- Preceded by: Ion Chicu
- Succeeded by: Sergiu Pușcuța

Personal details
- Born: Natalia Catrinescu; 21 September 1977 (age 48) Mălăiești, Moldavian SSR, Soviet Union (now Moldova)
- Citizenship: Moldova; Romania
- Party: Party of Action and Solidarity
- Education: Moldova State University (LLB); Harvard Kennedy School (MPP)
- Profession: Economist

Natalia Gavrilița (Romanian: [ɡavriˈlitsa]; born 21 September 1977) is a Moldovan economist and politician who served as prime minister of Moldova from 2021 until her resignation in February 2023 after failure to get her reform package enacted.

Gavrilița had been previously proposed as prime minister by Maia Sandu in February 2021, but was rejected by the PSRM-Șor parliamentary majority. She was proposed once again in August 2021, following the 2021 parliamentary election, and was approved along with her cabinet.

In the 2021 parliamentary election, Gavrilița was also elected to the Parliament of Moldova on behalf of the Party of Action and Solidarity (PAS). She previously served as finance minister from June 2019 to November 2019 in the cabinet of Sandu, when the latter served as prime minister.

== Early life and education ==
Natalia Gavriliţa was born on 21 September 1977 in the family of Valery and Nina Catrinescu. Between 1995 and 2000, Natalia Gavrilița studied for a bachelor's degree at Moldova State University, she has a degree in International Law. In 2003, she attended the Edmund S. Muskie Graduate Fellowship Program. Natalia Gavrilița has a master's degree in Public Policy from the Harvard Kennedy School of Government at Harvard University.

== Career ==
Natalia Gavrilița has held several positions in the public service of the Republic of Moldova and has worked in international development projects in several countries in the world.

Natalia Gavrilița, between 2007 and 2008, worked in the Ministry of Economy and Infrastructure, as a head of the Department for Economic Forecasts and Development Programs. From 2008 to 2009 she was the head of the Directorate for Policy Coordination and External Assistance within the State Chancellery. From 2010 to 2013 Natalia Gavrilița worked for Oxford Policy Management in the UK as a senior consultant and subsequently as a portfolio manager on valuation methods. Between 2013 and 2015 she was the chief of staff and then secretary of state in the Ministry of Education, led at that time by Maia Sandu. She also served as executive director of the World Bank's Education Reform Project.

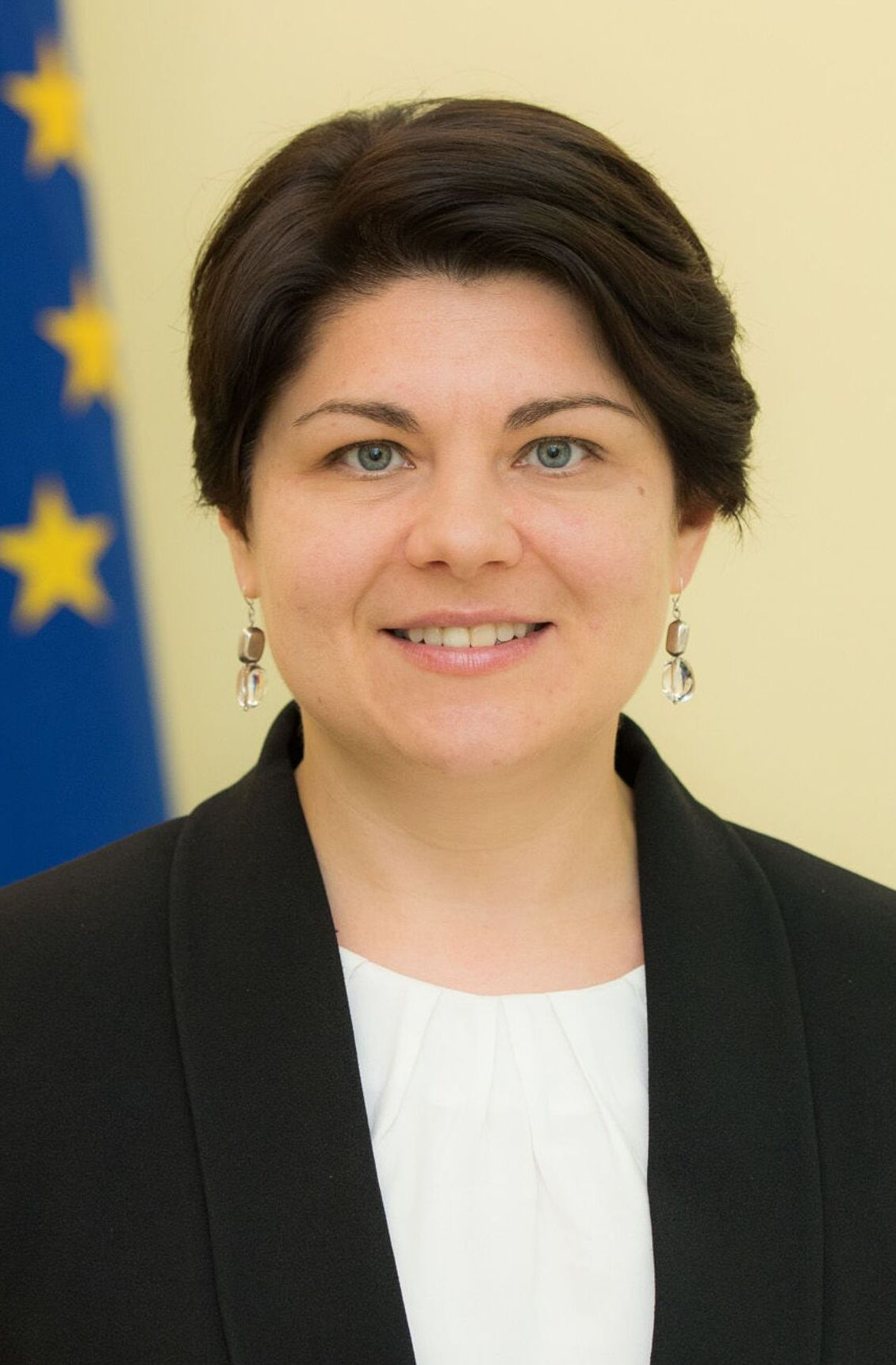
Official portrait, 2019

From 2015 to 2019, she was Managing Director of the Global Innovation Fund where she managed a portfolio of 11 innovative projects with a budget of approximately 13.5 million dollars and led the selection, analysis, contracting and managing innovation investment projects for several developing countries in Africa and Asia. In 2019, she was Minister of Finance in the Government of Maia Sandu, where she distinguished herself by mobilizing budget support in the amount of about 100 million US dollars, restoring relations and resuming budget support with the IMF and the European Union. Within the Government, she elaborated the Solidarity Budget which provided for salary increases for certain categories of employees, aid for the needy, increase of allowances.

In 2021, she was nominated by the president of the Republic of Moldova as a candidate for the position of Prime Minister of the Republic of Moldova, PSRM-Șor coalition rejected the candidacy of Natalia Gavrilița and the team of ministers. According to various news sites, including the Associated Press, she announced her resignation from her position as prime minister on 10 February 2023.

=== Premiership ===
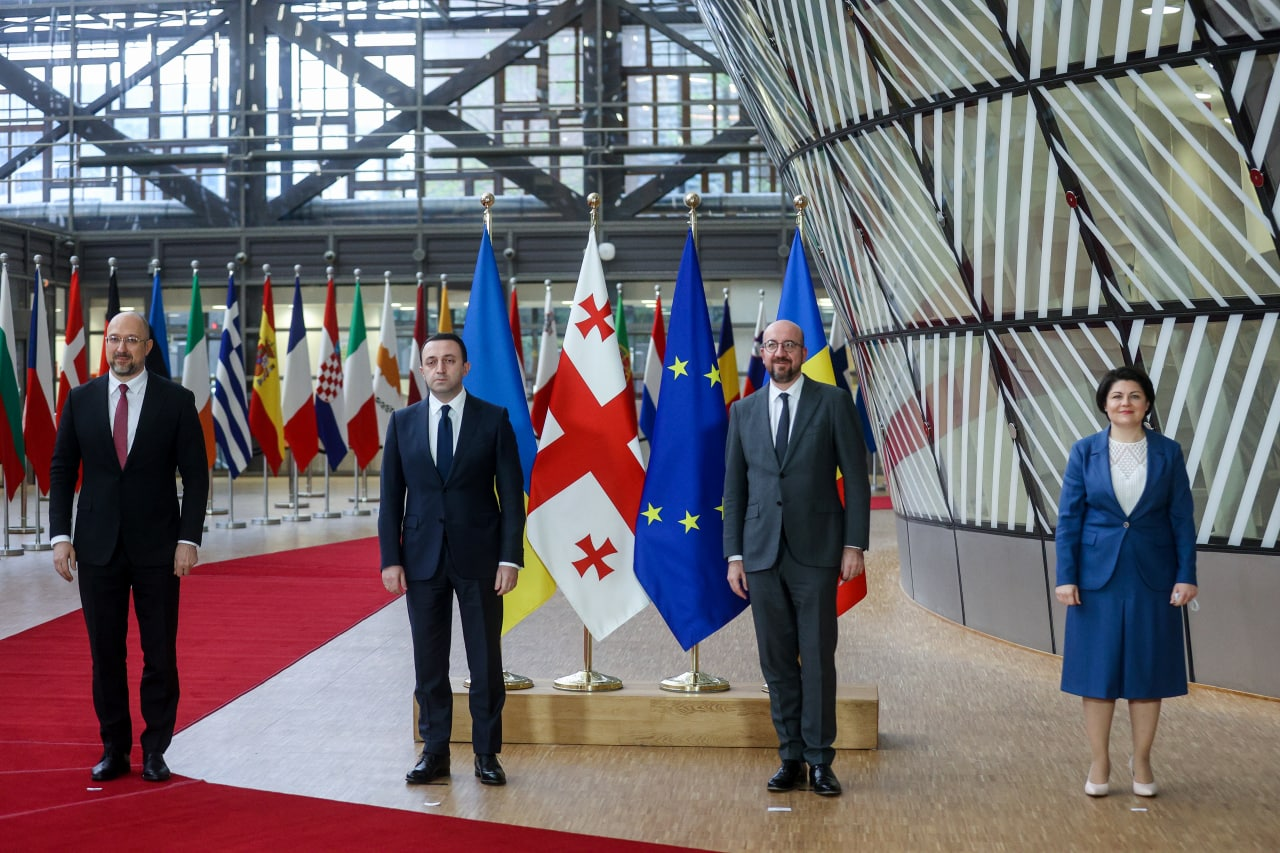
Gavrilița with President of the European Council Charles Michel, Ukrainian Prime Minister Denys Shmyhal and Georgian Prime Minister Irakli Garibashvili in 2021

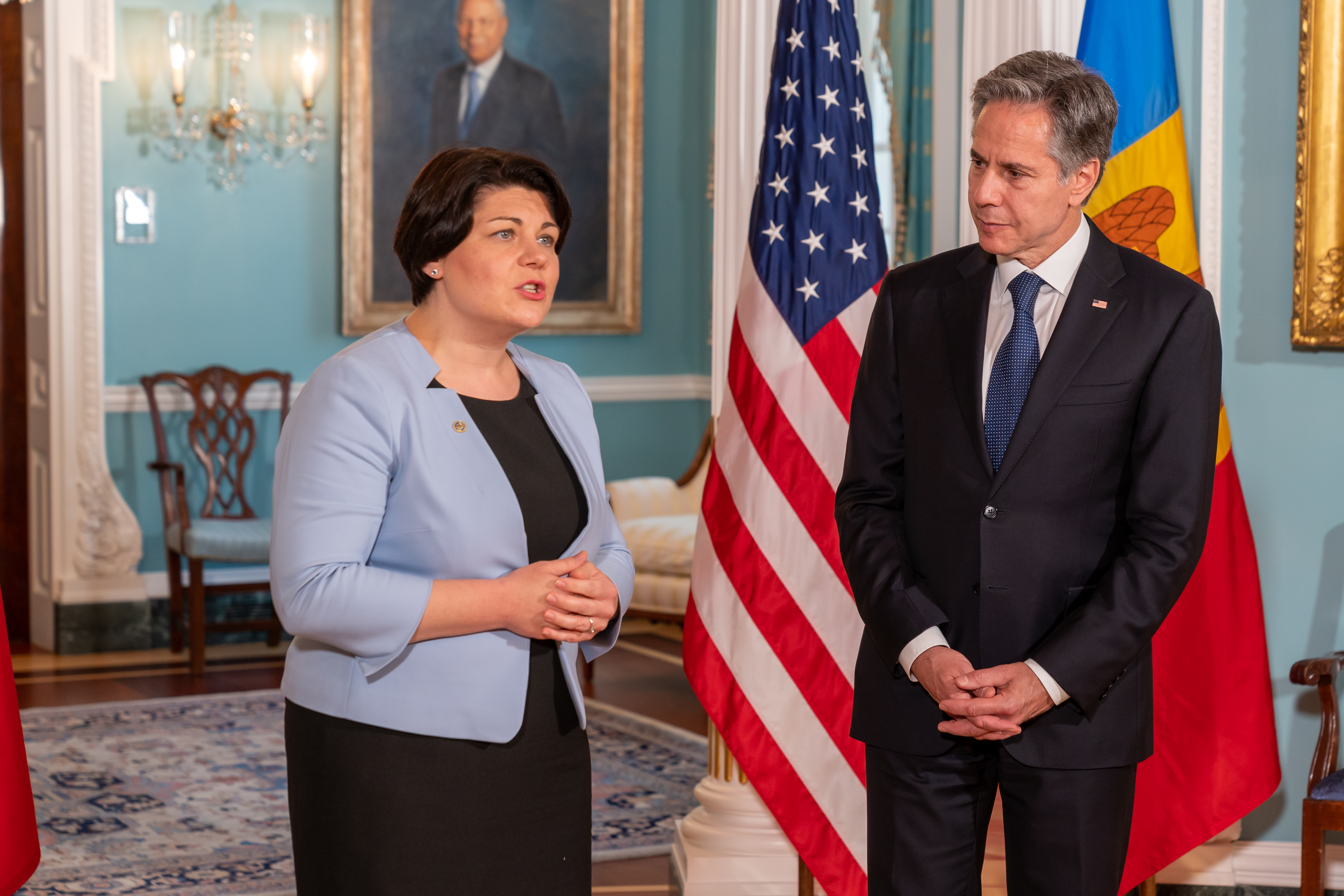
Gavrilița with US Secretary of State Antony Blinken in 2022

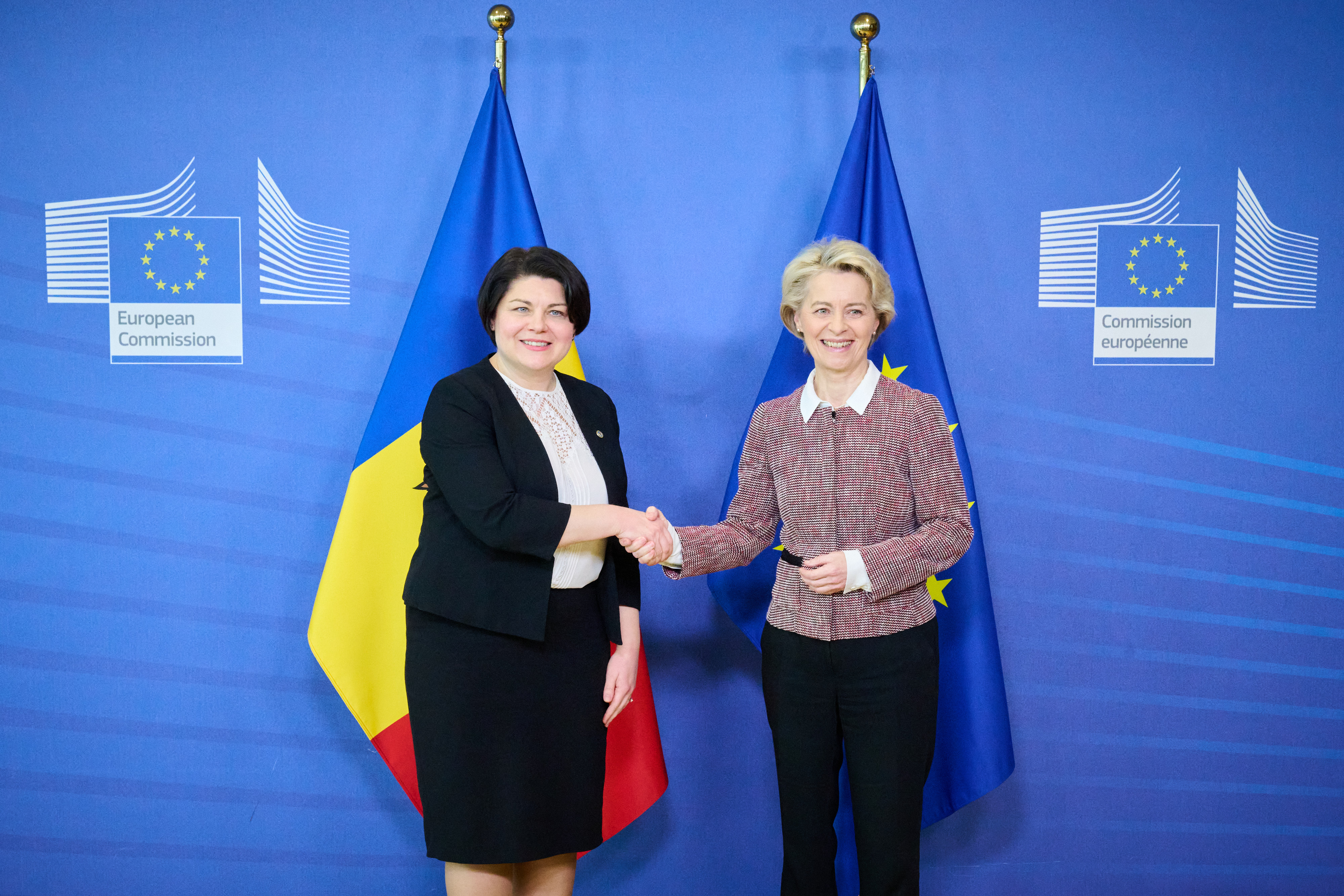
Gavrilița with President of the European Commission Ursula von der Leyen in 2023

Following the 2021 Moldovan parliamentary election in July 2021, the Party of Action and Solidarity (PAS) clinched a majority of 63 members in the Parliament of the Republic of Moldova, Natalia Gavrilița being elected as well in the Parliament of the Republic of Moldova on the PAS list. On 6 August 2021, Natalia Gavrilița was elected Prime Minister of Moldova. On 18 August, she met with Octavian Armașu, governor of the National Bank of Moldova, to exchange views on monetary policy.

== Political views ==
She supports Moldova joining the European Union, but not joining NATO or uniting with Romania.

== Personal life ==
Gavrilița was married to Vladimir Gavrilița, an advisor in the control body of the prime minister, during the time when the premiership was held by Maia Sandu. They divorced in June 2021.

In addition to Romanian, she is also fluent in Russian, English, French, and Spanish.

Her grandfather, Trifon Catrinescu, fought in the Soviet Army in the Second World War, being decorated with the medal "For the Victory over Germany in the Great Patriotic War 1941–1945".

Political offices
Preceded by Ion Chicu	Minister of Finance; 2019	Succeeded by Sergiu Pușcuța
Preceded by Aureliu Ciocoi; Acting	Prime Minister of Moldova; 2021–2023	Succeeded by Dorin Recean
