= Academy of Economic Studies of Moldova =

University in Moldova

Coordinates: 47.0310°N 28.8384°E

- Academia de Studii Economice a Moldovei
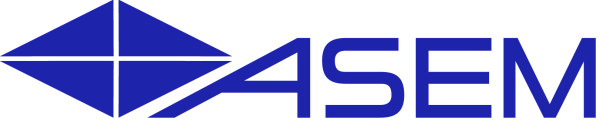
- Type: Public
- Established: 1991
- Rector: Alexandru Stratan
- Academic staff: 500
- Students: 16,000
- Location: 61 Metropolitan Gavril Bănulescu-Bodoni Street, Chișinău, MD-2005, Moldova
- Website: ase.md

The Academy of Economic Studies of Moldova (ASEM; Romanian: Academia de Studii Economice a Moldovei) is a university located in Chișinău, Moldova.

== Organization ==
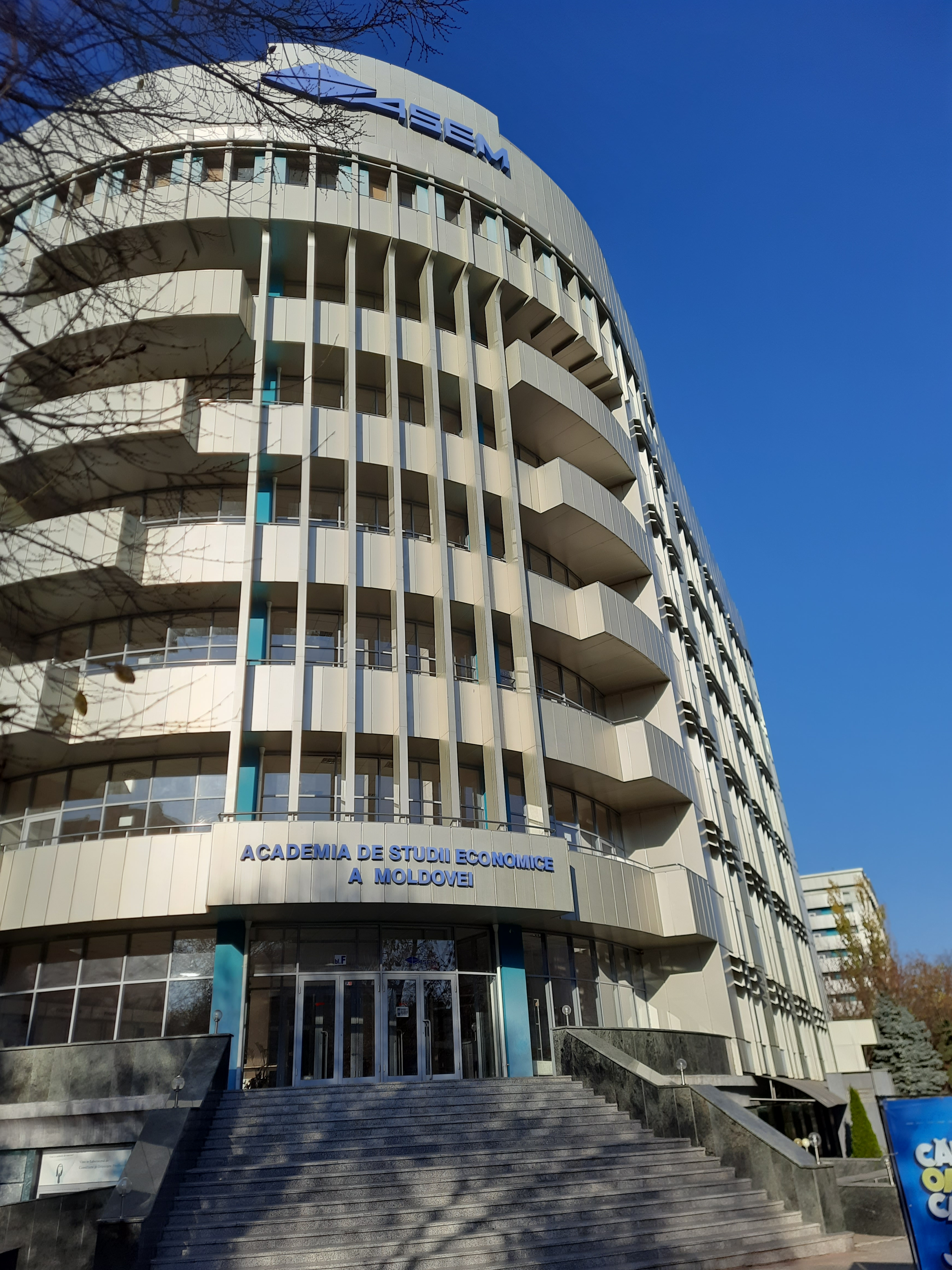

The university is organized into six faculties:

- ITT
- Business Management and Administration
- Economics and Law
- International Economic Relations
- Finance
- Accounting
- Economic Cybernetics, Statistics and Informatics

== See also ==
- List of universities in Moldova
- Education in Moldova
