= List of diplomatic missions of Moldova =

This is a list of diplomatic missions of Moldova. The landlocked country of Moldova, sandwiched between Romania and Ukraine, has a handful of embassies, mostly located in Europe.

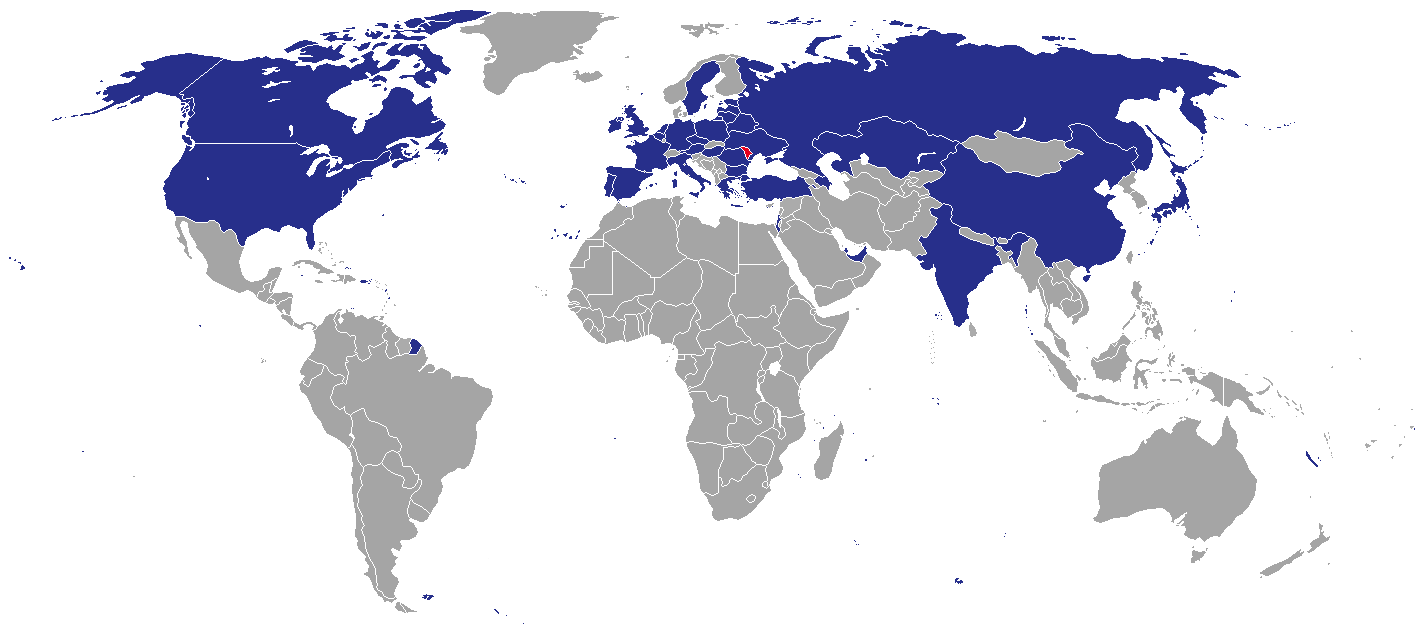
Countries with Moldovan diplomatic missions

== America ==
Host country	Host city	Mission	Head of mission	Concurrent accreditation	Ref.
Canada	Ottawa	Embassy	Sergiu Odainic		
United States	Washington, D.C.	Embassy	Vladislav Kulminski	Countries: Brazil; Mexico	
United States	Chicago	Consulate-General	Vladislav Kulminski	Countries: Brazil; Mexico	
United States	Sacramento	Consulate-General	Vladislav Kulminski	Countries: Brazil; Mexico	

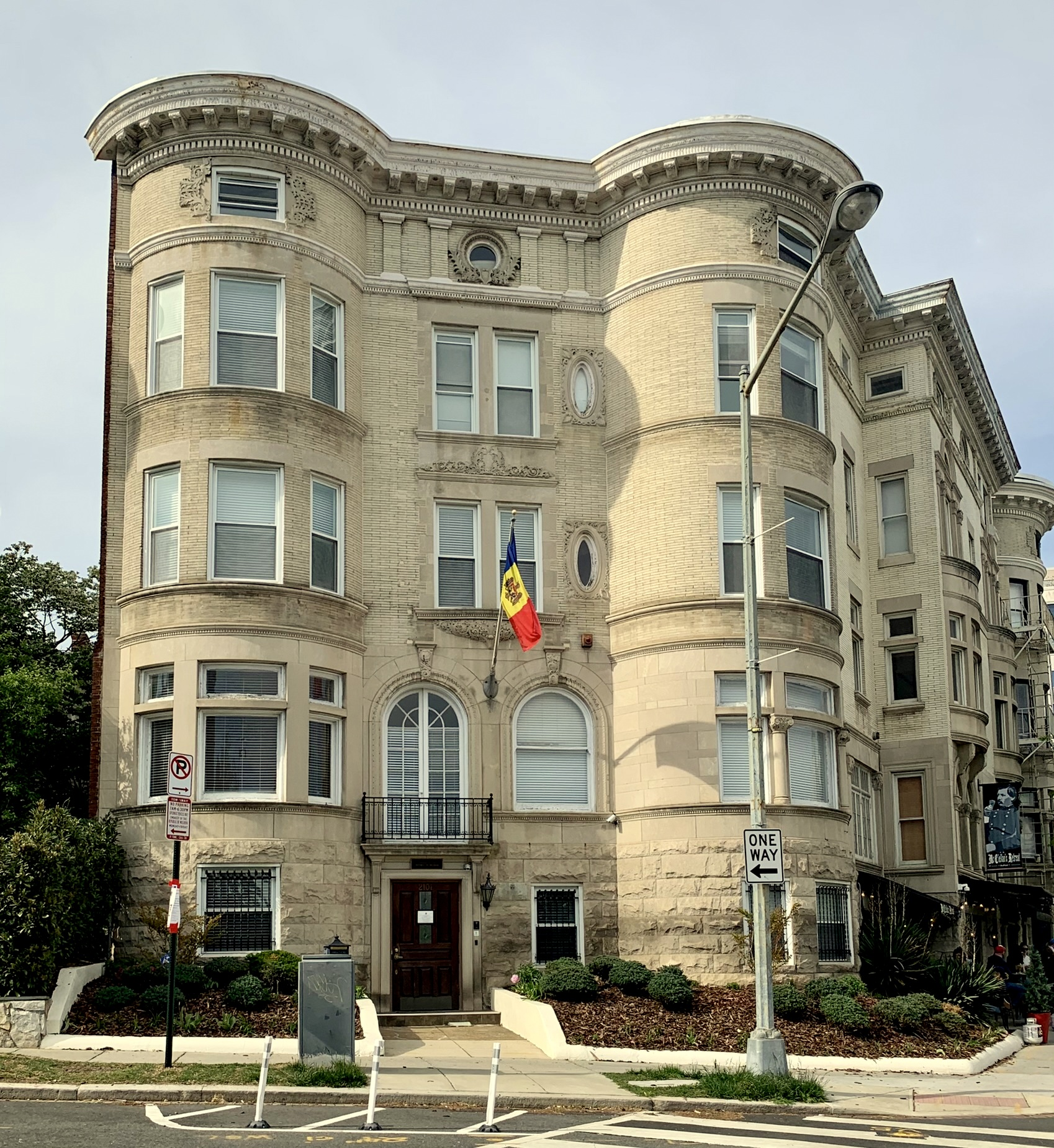
Embassy in Washington, D.C.

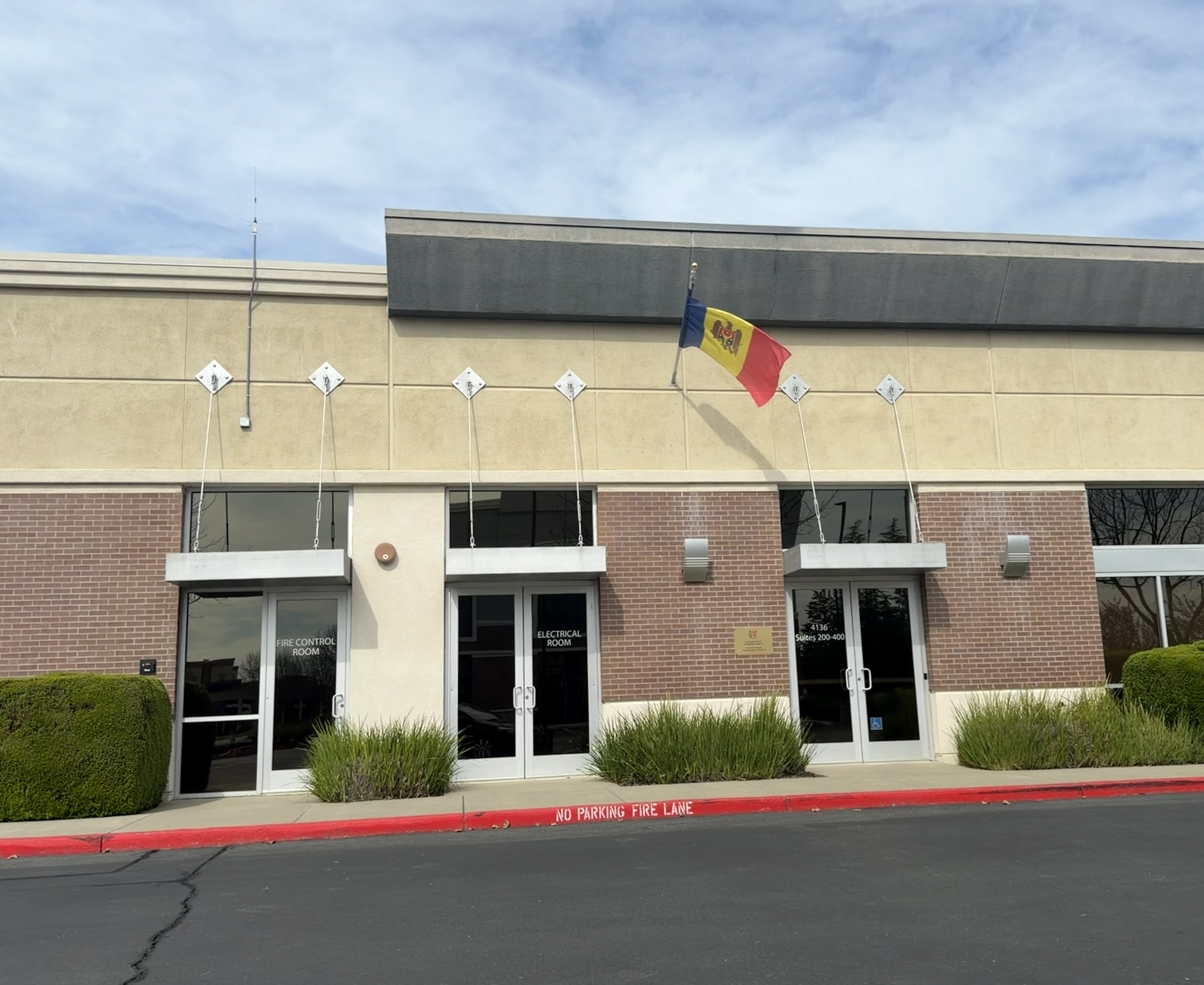
Consulate-General in Sacramento

== Asia ==
Host country	Host city	Mission	Head of mission	Concurrent accreditation	Ref.
Azerbaijan	Baku	Embassy	Alexandru Esaulenco	Countries: Georgia; Iran	
China	Beijing	Embassy	Petru Frunze	Countries: Vietnam	
India	New Delhi	Embassy	Inga Ionesii		
Israel	Tel Aviv	Embassy	Alexandr Roitman		
Japan	Tokyo	Embassy	Sergiu Mihov	Countries: South Korea	
Kazakhstan	Astana	Embassy	Igor Moldovan		
Qatar	Doha	Embassy	Vitalie Rusu	Countries: Kuwait; Oman	
Turkey	Ankara	Embassy	Oleg Serebrian	Countries: Egypt; Jordan; Lebanon	
Turkey	Istanbul	Consulate General	Oleg Serebrian	Countries: Egypt; Jordan; Lebanon	
United Arab Emirates	Abu Dhabi	Embassy	Anatolie Vangheli	Countries: Bahrain; Saudi Arabia	

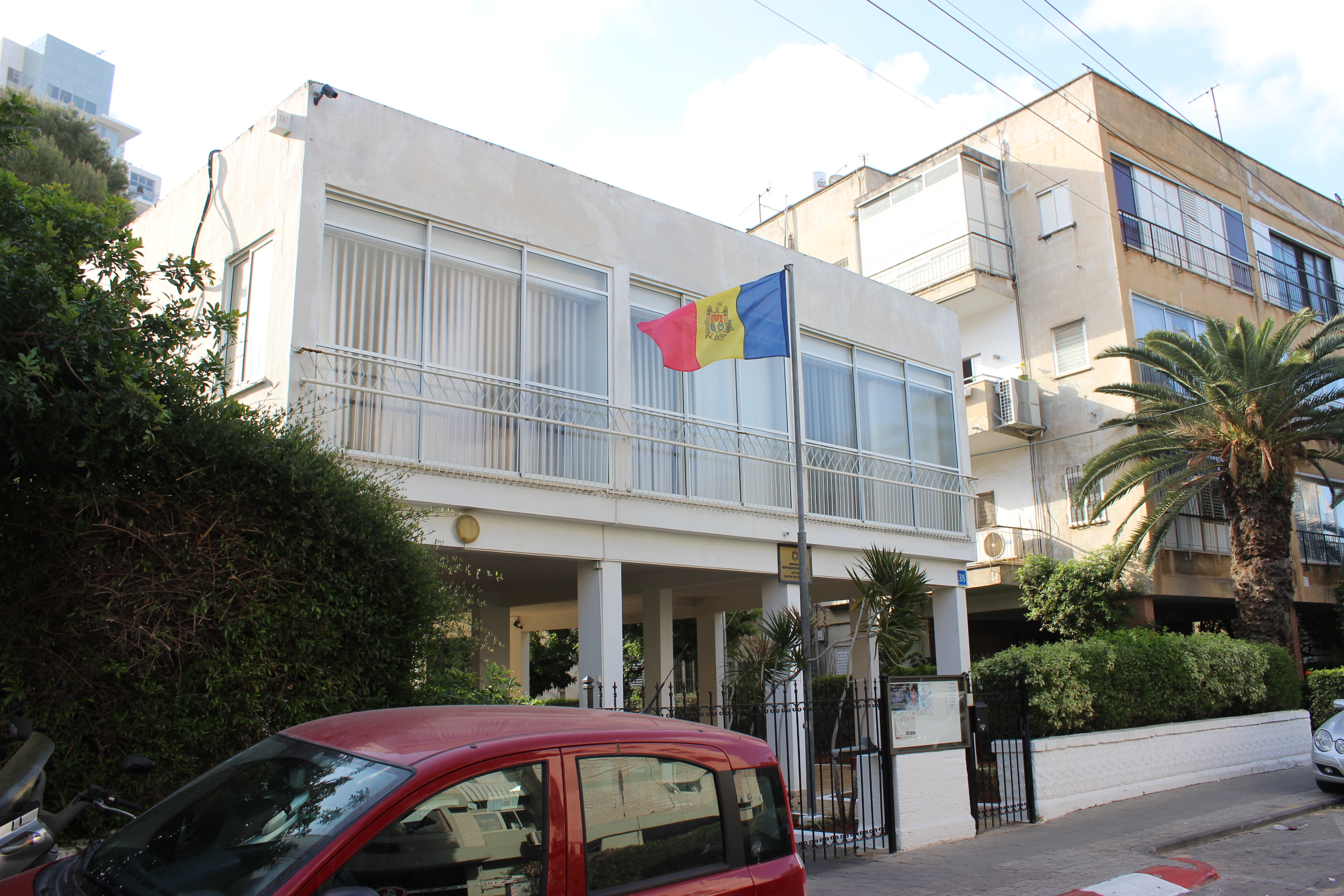
Embassy in Tel-Aviv

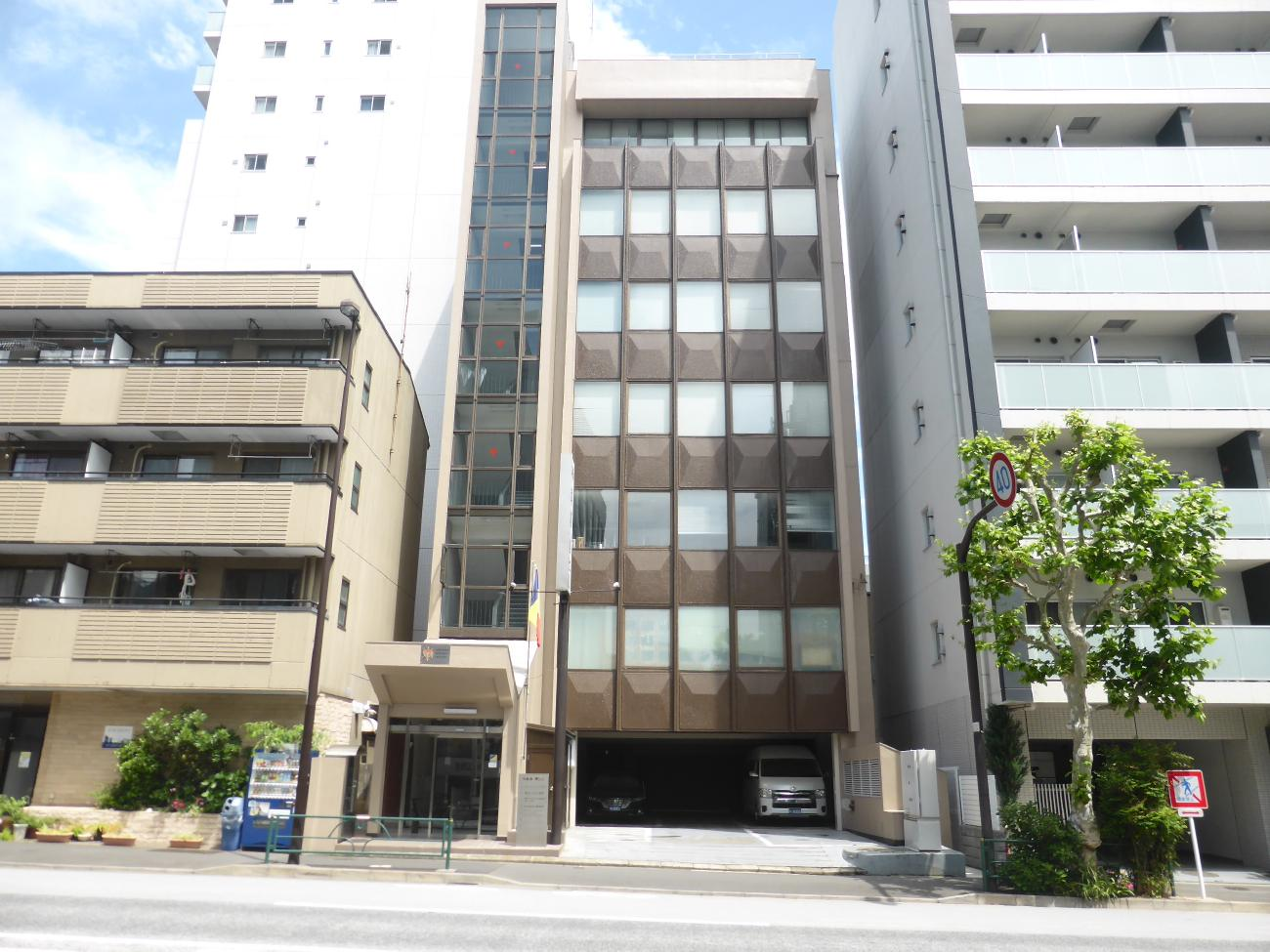
Embassy in Tokyo

== Europe ==
Host country	Host city	Mission	Head of mission	Concurrent accreditation	Ref.
Austria	Vienna	Embassy	Victoria Roșa	Countries: Slovakia	
Belarus	Minsk	Embassy			
Belgium	Brussels	Embassy	Valeriu Mija	Countries: Luxembourg	
Bulgaria	Sofia	Embassy	Emil Jacotă	Countries: Albania; North Macedonia	
Czech Republic	Prague	Embassy	Gabriela Moraru		
Estonia	Tallinn	Embassy	Eugen Caras		
France	Paris	Embassy	Lorina Bălteanu	Countries: Monaco	
France	Nice	Consulate General	Lorina Bălteanu	Countries: Monaco	
Germany	Berlin	Embassy	Aureliu Ciocoi		
Germany	Frankfurt	Consulate General	Aureliu Ciocoi		
Greece	Athens	Embassy	Alexandru Codreanu	Countries: Cyprus	
Hungary	Budapest	Embassy	Mihail Barbulat	Countries: Bosnia and Herzegovina; Croatia; Slovenia	
Ireland	Dublin	Embassy	Larisa Miculeț (acting)		
Italy	Rome	Embassy	Oleg Nica	Countries: Libya; Malta; San Marino; Sovereign Entity: Sovereign Military Order of Malta	
Italy	Milan	Consulate-General	Oleg Nica	Countries: Libya; Malta; San Marino; Sovereign Entity: Sovereign Military Order of Malta	
Italy	Padua	Consulate-General	Oleg Nica	Countries: Libya; Malta; San Marino; Sovereign Entity: Sovereign Military Order of Malta	
Latvia	Riga	Embassy	Mihaela Mocanu		
Lithuania	Vilnius	Embassy	Angelica Munteanu		
Netherlands	The Hague	Embassy	Veaceslav Dobîndă	Countries: Denmark	
Poland	Warsaw	Embassy	Violeta Agrici		
Portugal	Lisbon	Embassy	Sergiu Gurduza	Countries: Morocco	
Romania	Bucharest	Embassy	Mihai Mîțu	Countries: Serbia; Montenegro	
Romania	Iași	Consulate General	Mihai Mîțu	Countries: Serbia; Montenegro	
Russia	Moscow	Embassy	Lilian Darii	Countries: Kyrgyzstan; Tajikistan	
Spain	Madrid	Embassy	Eugeniu Revenco	Countries: Algeria; Andorra; Tunisia	
Spain	Barcelona	Consulate General	Eugeniu Revenco	Countries: Algeria; Andorra; Tunisia	
Sweden	Stockholm	Embassy	Viorel Ursu	Countries: Finland; Iceland; Norway	
Ukraine	Kyiv	Embassy	Victor Chirilă	Countries: Armenia; Turkmenistan; Uzbekistan	
Ukraine	Odesa	Consulate General	Victor Chirilă	Countries: Armenia; Turkmenistan; Uzbekistan	
United Kingdom	London	Embassy	Ruslan Bolbocean		

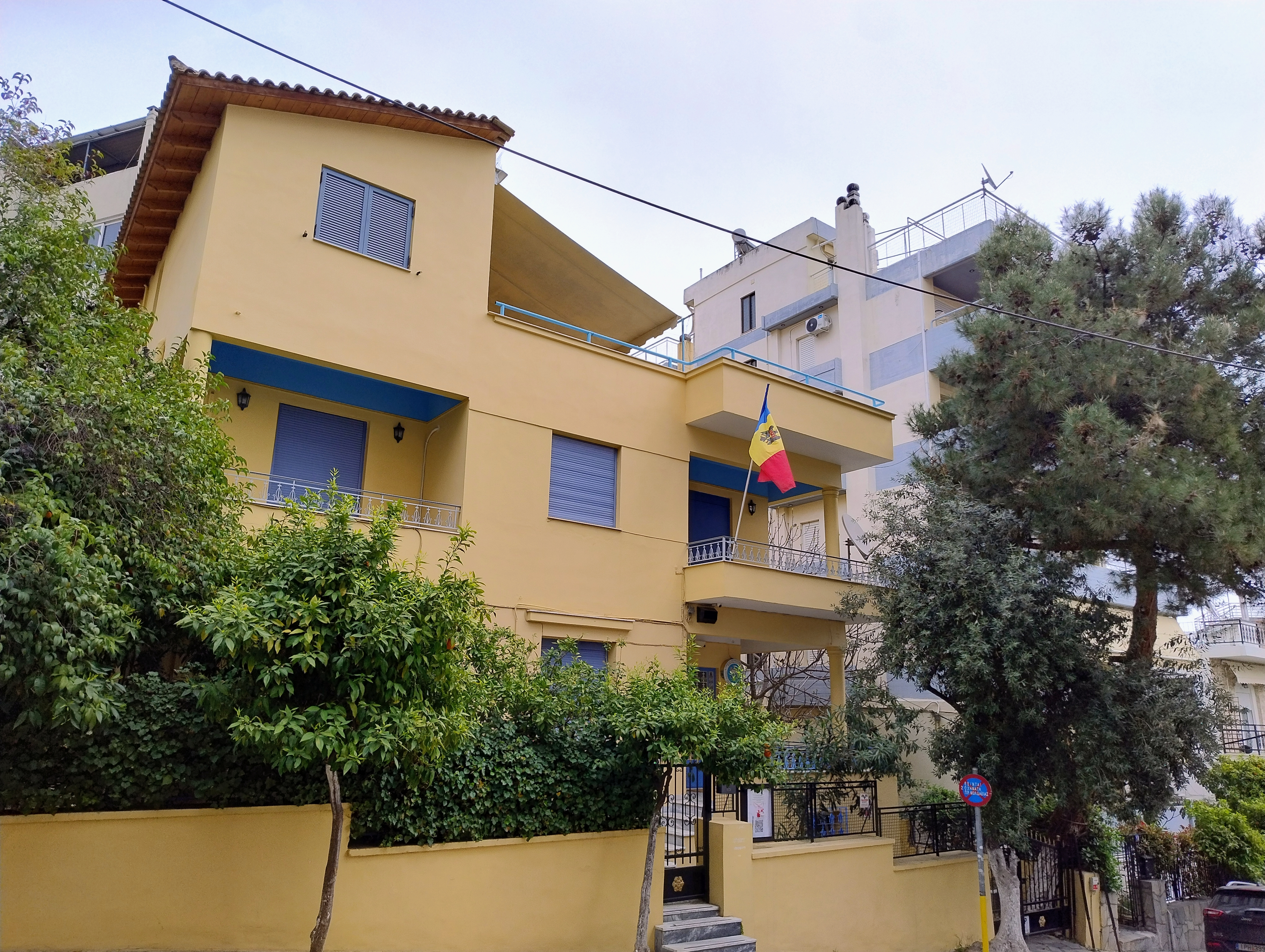
Embassy in Athens

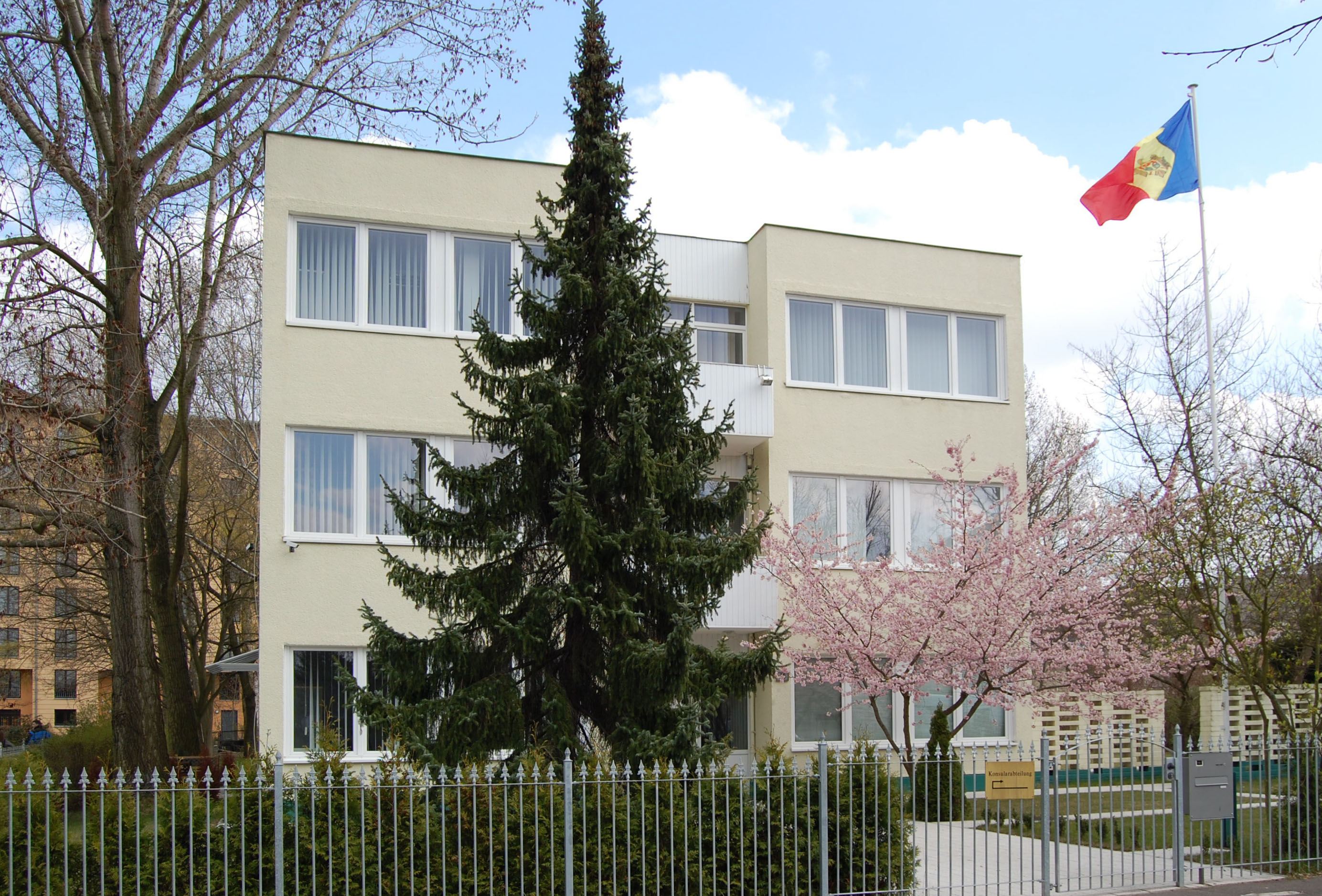
Embassy in Berlin

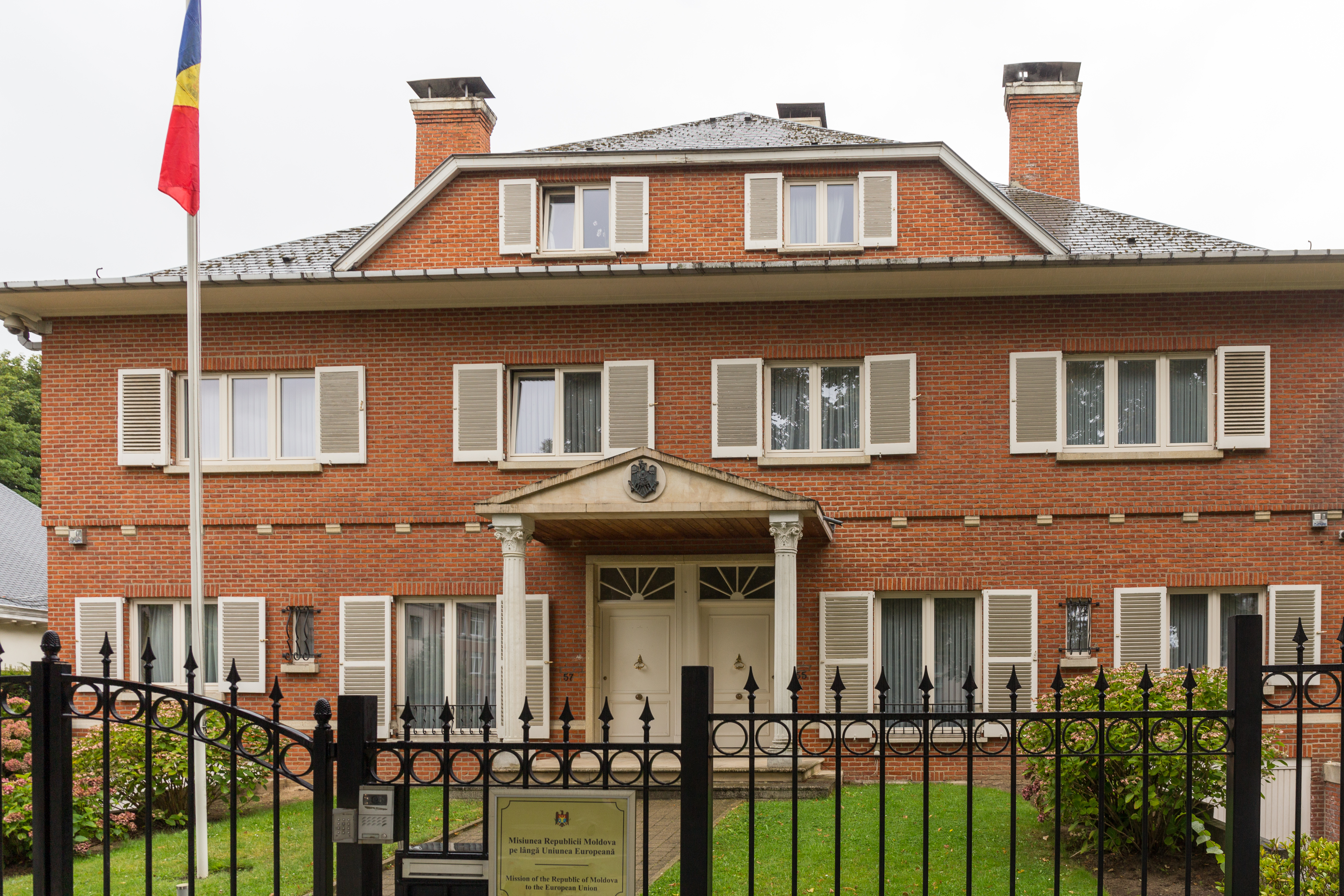
Embassy in Brussels

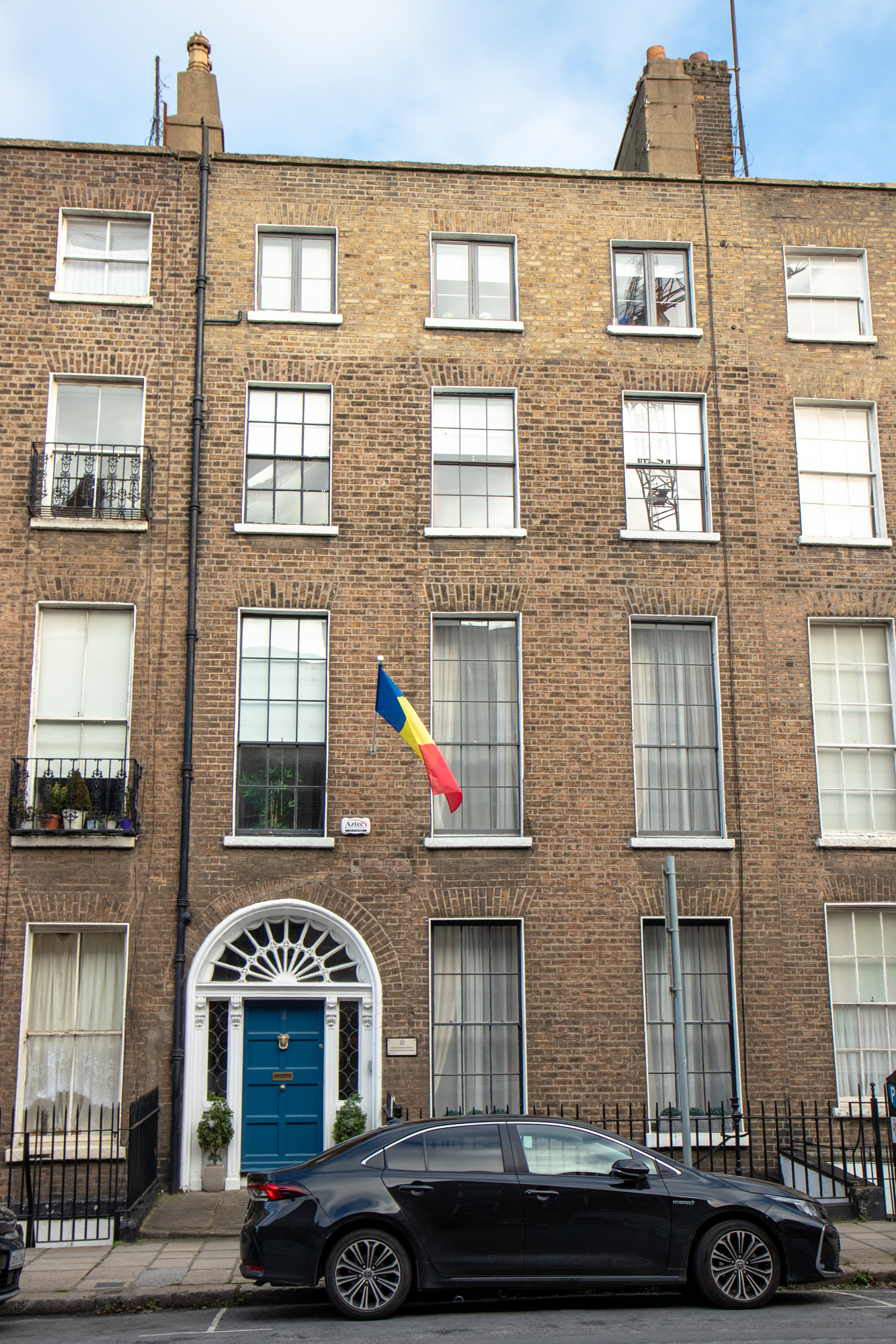
Embassy in Dublin

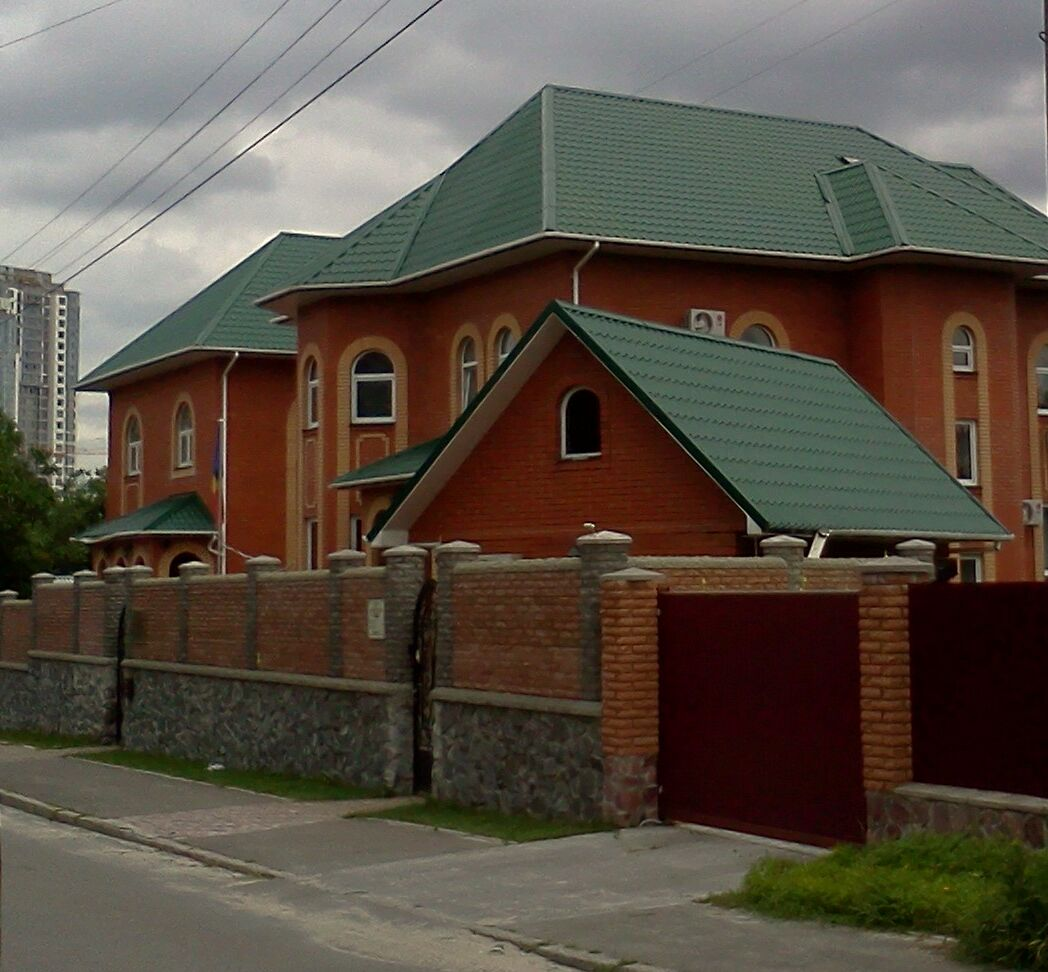
Embassy in Kyiv

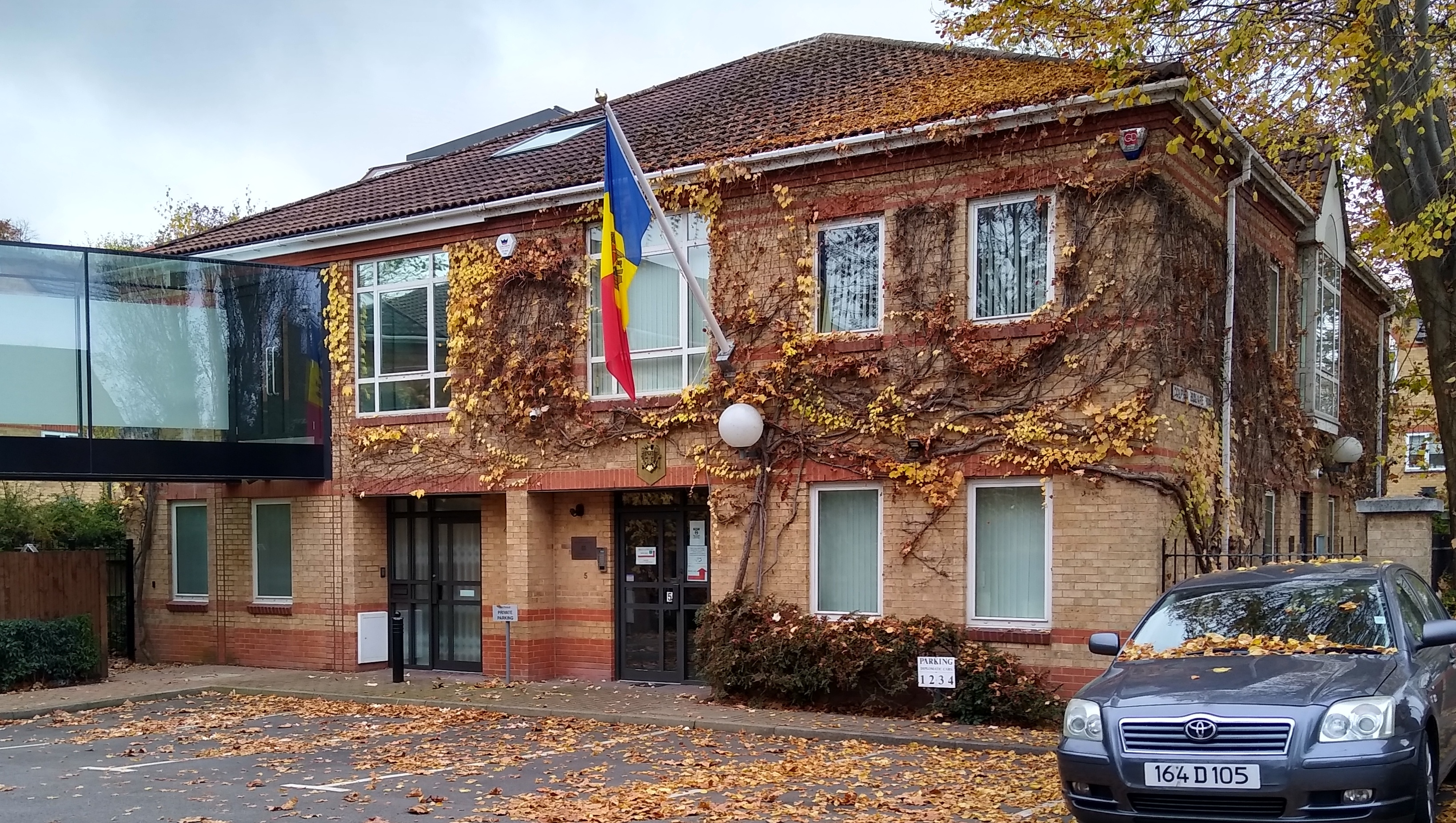
Embassy in London

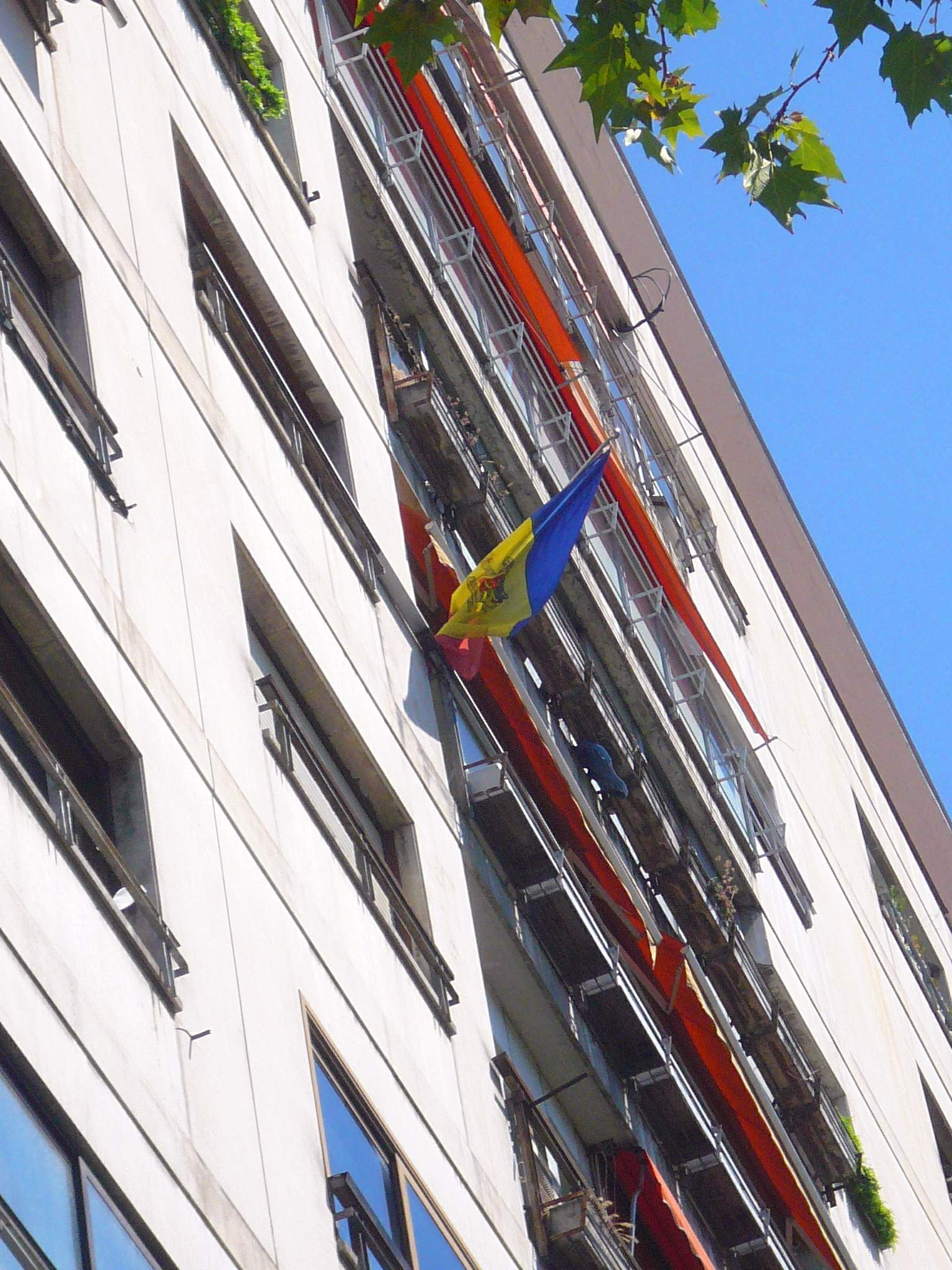
Embassy in Madrid

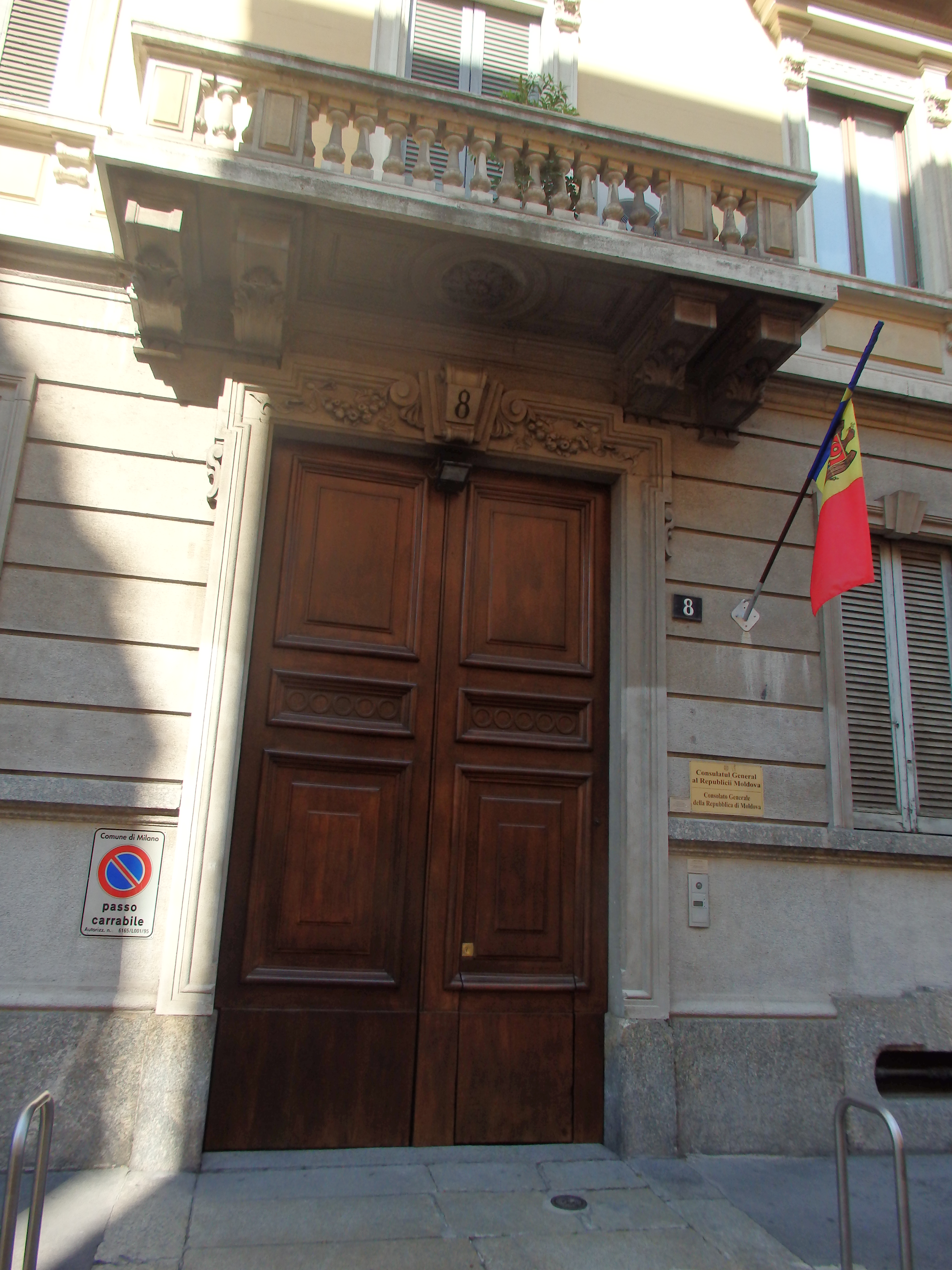
Consulate-General in Milan

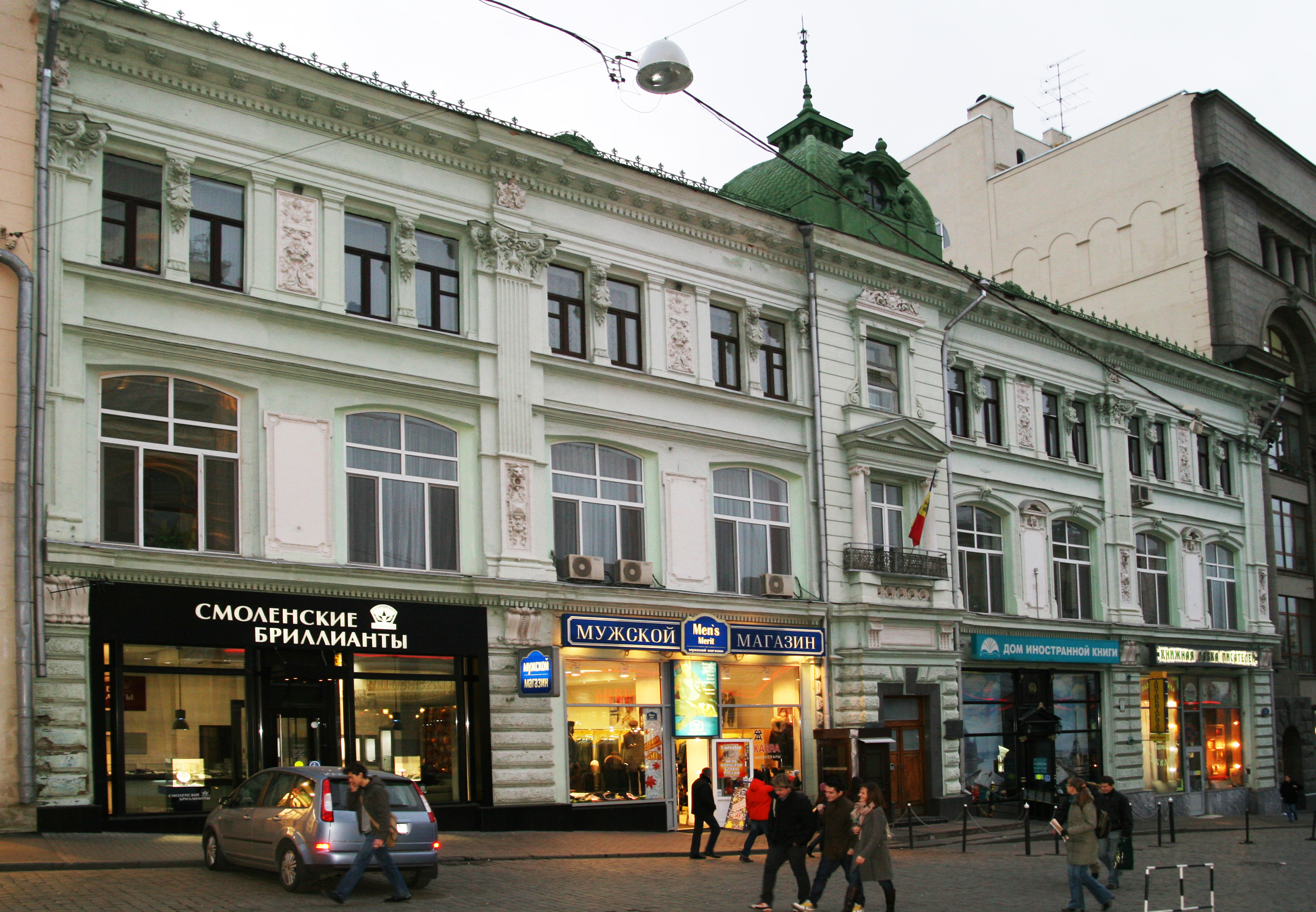
Embassy in Moscow

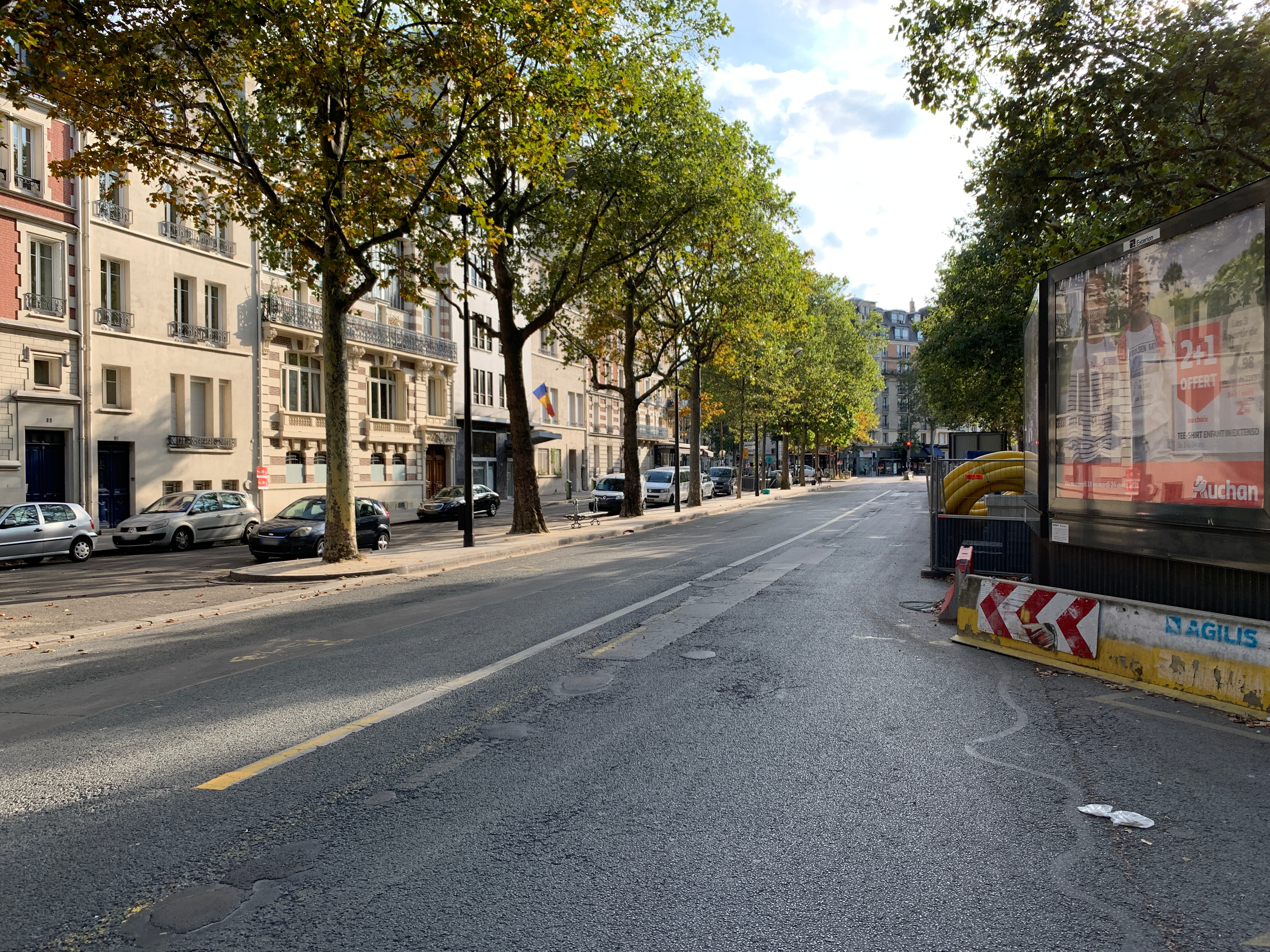
Embassy in Paris

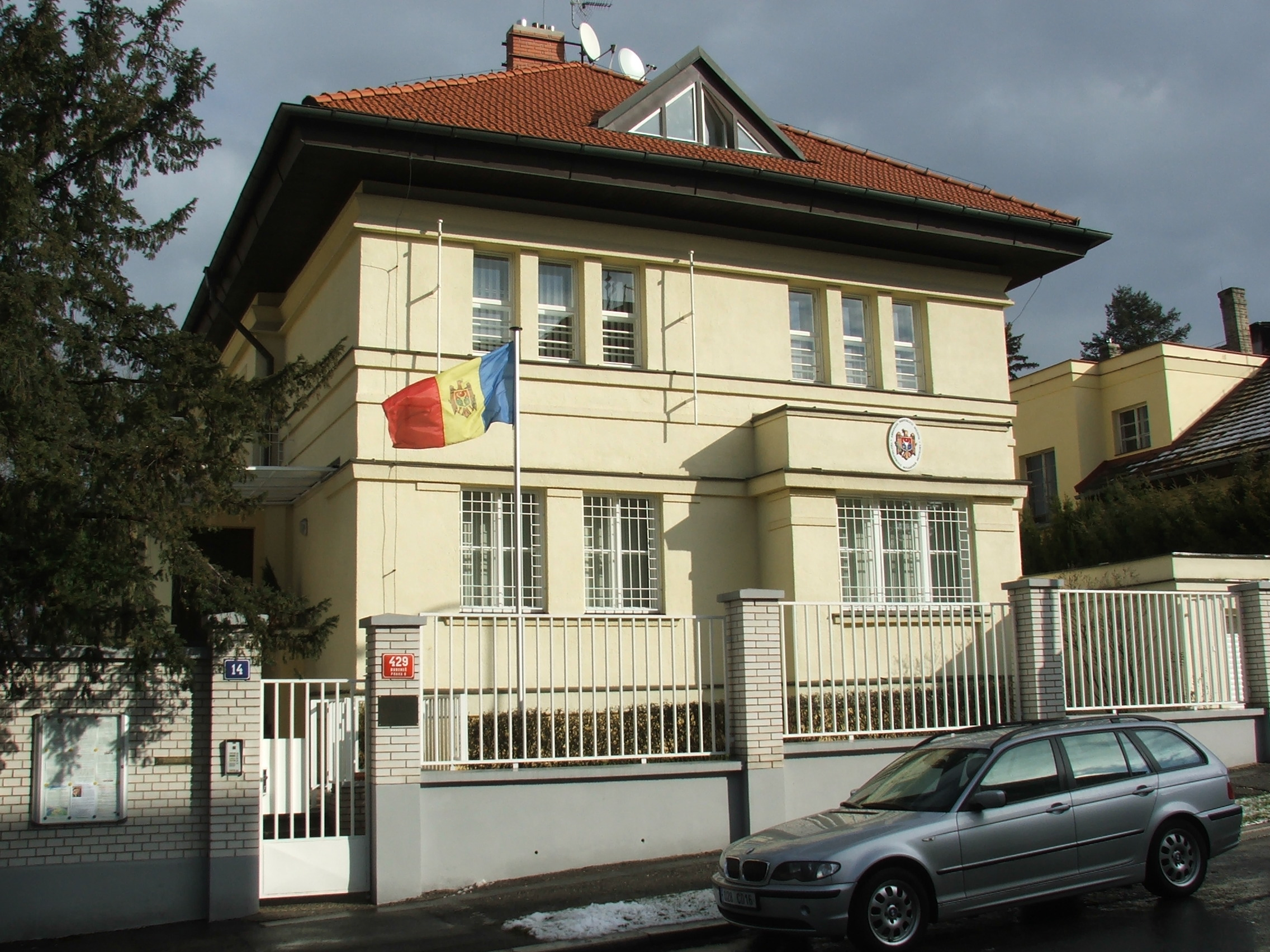
Embassy in Prague

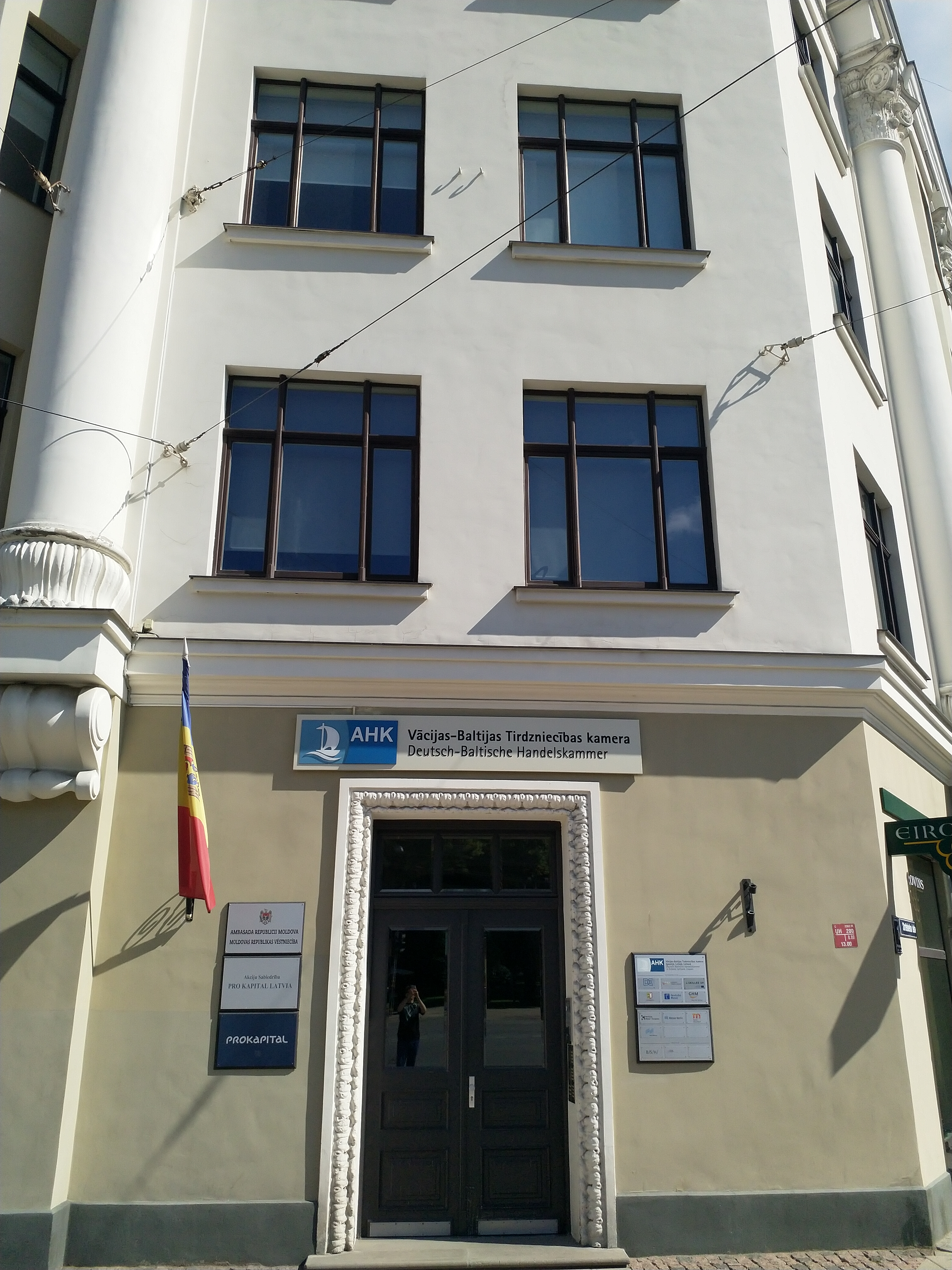
Embassy in Riga

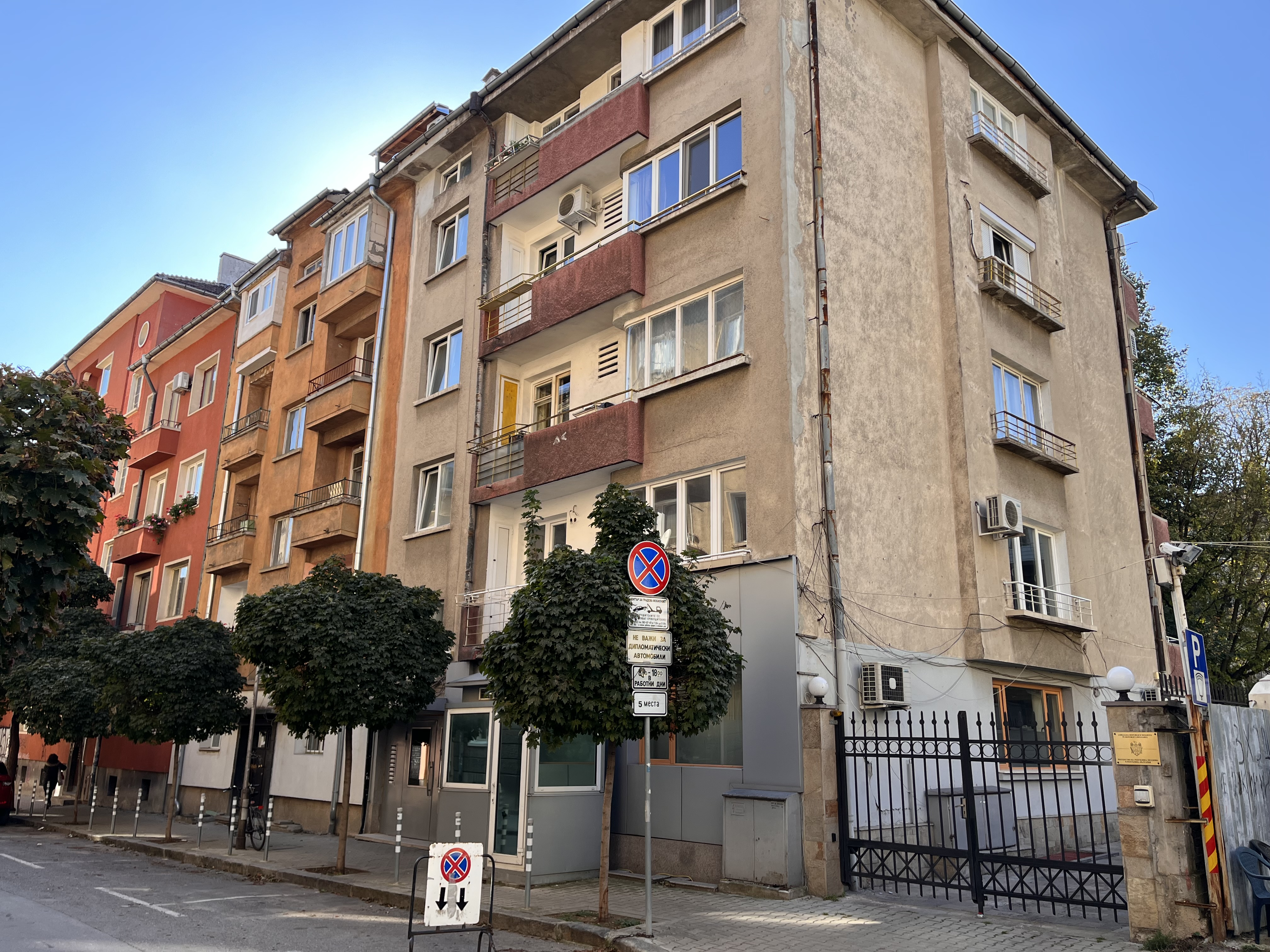
Embassy in Sofia

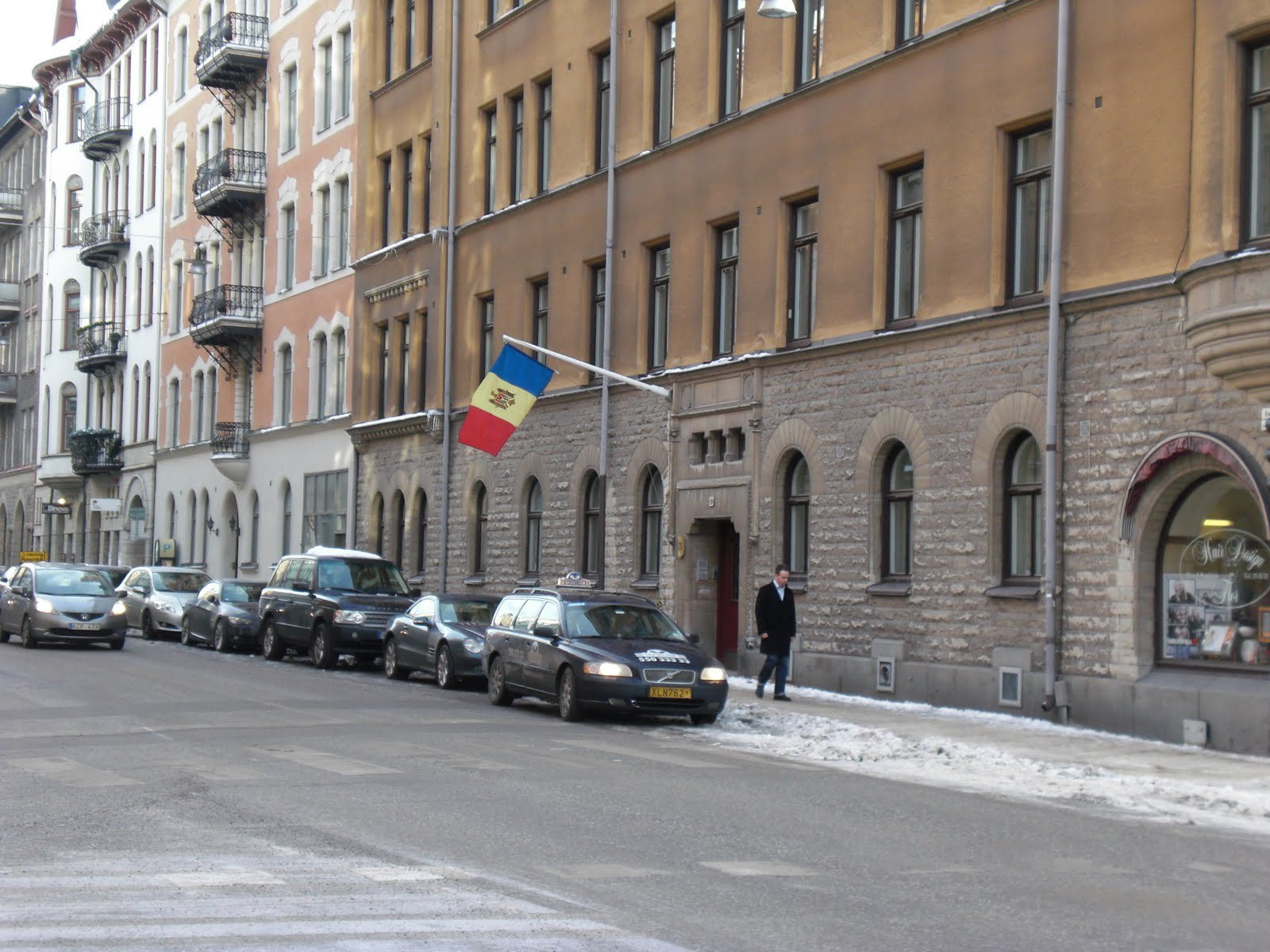
Embassy in Stockholm

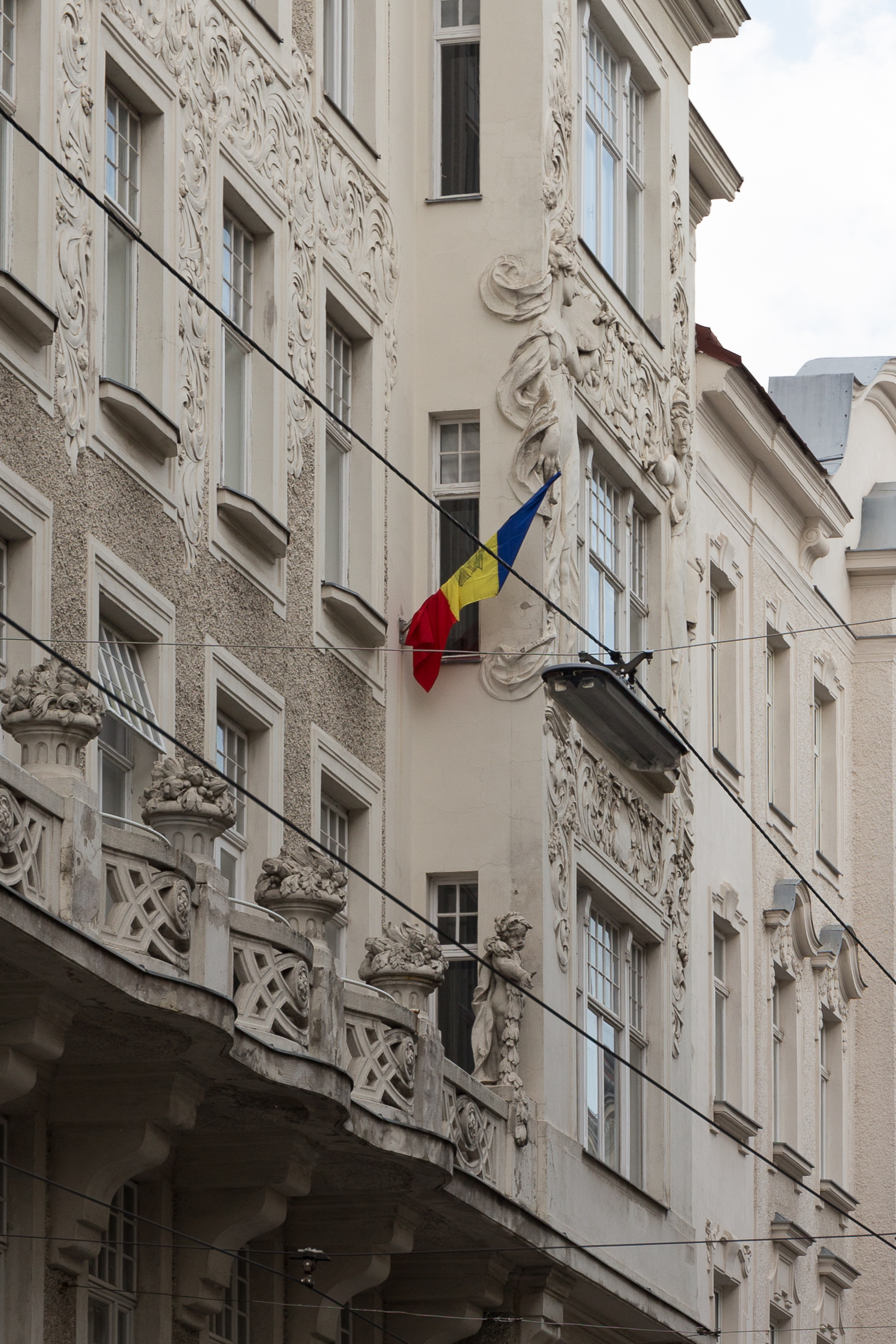
Embassy in Vienna

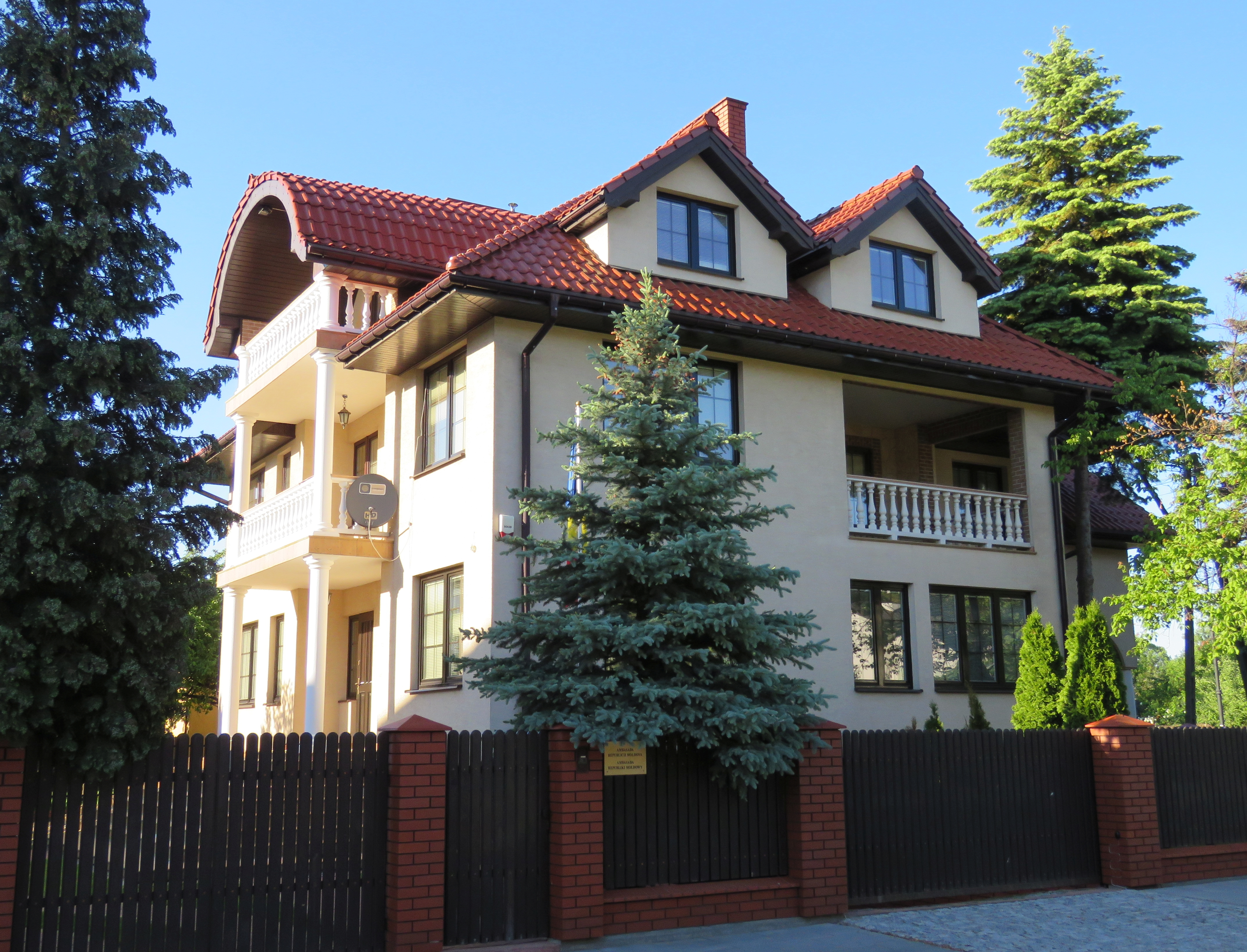
Embassy in Warsaw

== Multilateral organisations ==
- Brussels (Representation to the European Communities) – Ambassador, Head of Mission – Daniela Morari
- Brussels (Representation to NATO) – Head of Mission – Viorel Cibotaru
- Geneva (General Delegation) – Ambassador, Permanent Representative – Vladimir Cuc
- New York City (Representation to the United Nations) – Ambassador, Permanent Representative – Gheorghe Leucă (Note: Also accredited to Guatemala.)
- Strasbourg (Representation to the Council of Europe) – Ambassador, Permanent Representative – Victor Lăpușneanu
- Vienna (Representation to the OSCE) – Permanent Representative – Victoria Roșa
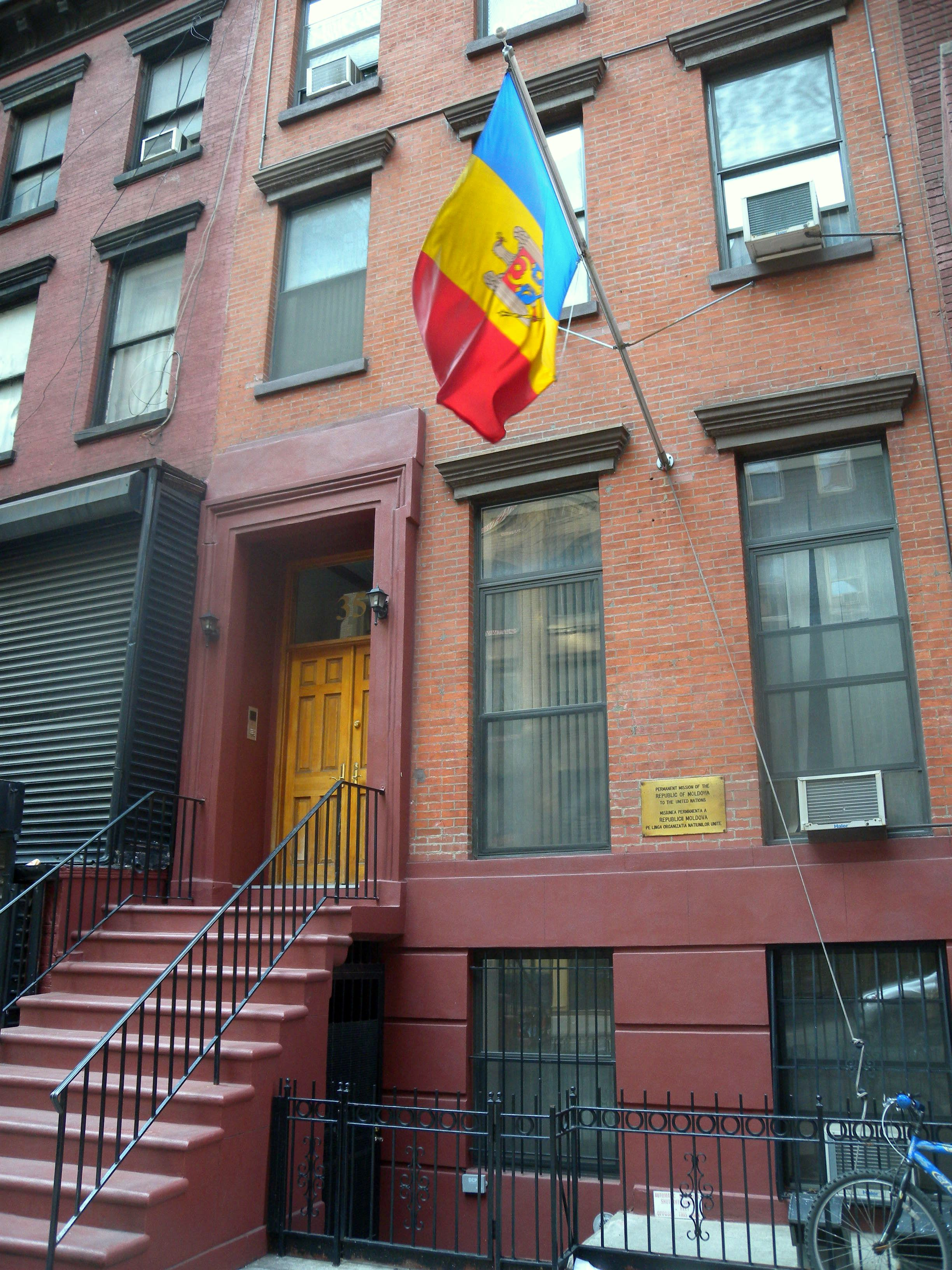
Permanent Mission to the U.N. in New York City

== See also ==
- List of diplomatic missions in Moldova
- Foreign relations of Moldova
- Visa requirements for Moldovan citizens
