= List of ambassadors of Moldova to the United States =

Coordinates: 38°54′51.3″N 77°2′48″W

Ambassador of Moldova to the United States Embassy of Moldova, Washington, D.C.
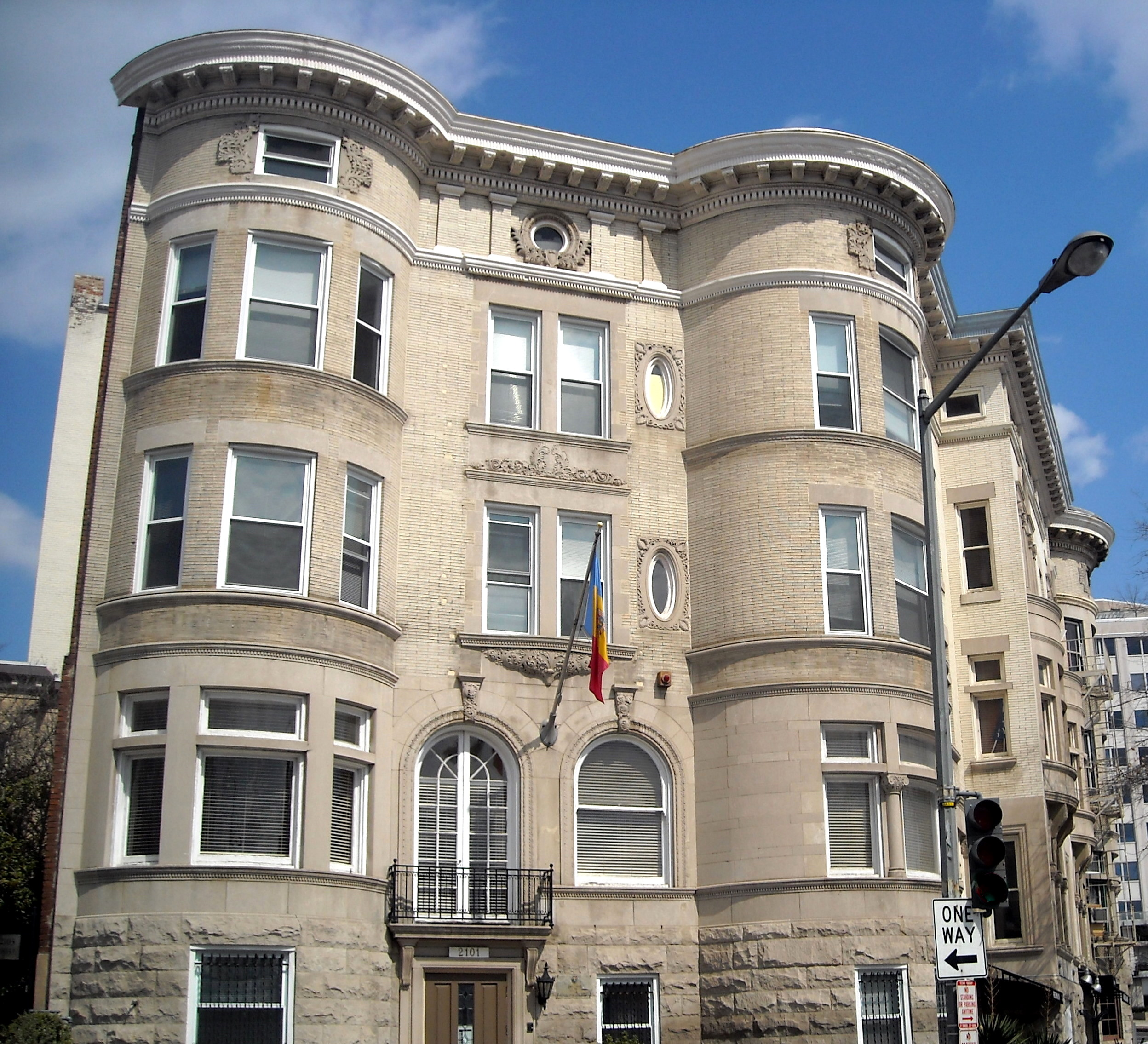
- Incumbent; Vladislav Kulminski since 30 June 2025
- Residence: 2101 S Street, N.W. Washington, D.C. 20008
- Formation: December 9, 1993
- First holder: Nicolae Țîu

The Moldovan ambassador to the United States is the official representative of the Moldovian Government in Chișinău to the Government of the United States. The ambassador is based in Washington D.C.

== List of representatives ==
Diplomatic agrément	Diplomatic accreditation	Ambassador	Observations	President of Moldova	President of the United States	Term end
1993	December 9, 1993	Nicolae Țâu		Andrei Sangheli	Bill Clinton	
December 21, 1998	January 21, 1999	Ceslav Ciobanu		Ion Ciubuc	Bill Clinton	
June 17, 2002	June 19, 2002	Mihail Manoli		Vasile Tarlev	George W. Bush	
September 8, 2006	September 12, 2006	Nicolae Chirtoacă		Vasile Tarlev	George W. Bush	
September 7, 2010	September 16, 2010	Igor Munteanu		Vlad Filat	Barack Obama	
2015		Tatiana Solomon	Chargé d'affaires	Chiril Gaburici	Barack Obama	
	2018	Cristina Balan			Donald J. Trump	2019
		Eugen Caras				
