= Moldova–United States relations =

- Moldova: United States

Diplomatic mission
- Embassy of Moldova, Washington, D.C.: Embassy of the United States, Chişinău

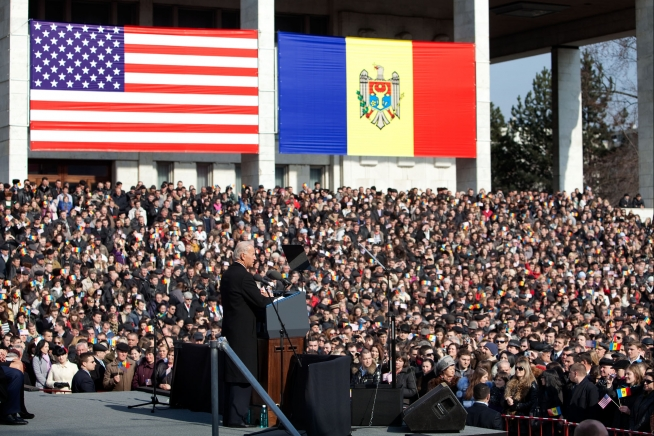
Official greeters await the arrival of Vice President Joe Biden in Chișinău, 2011

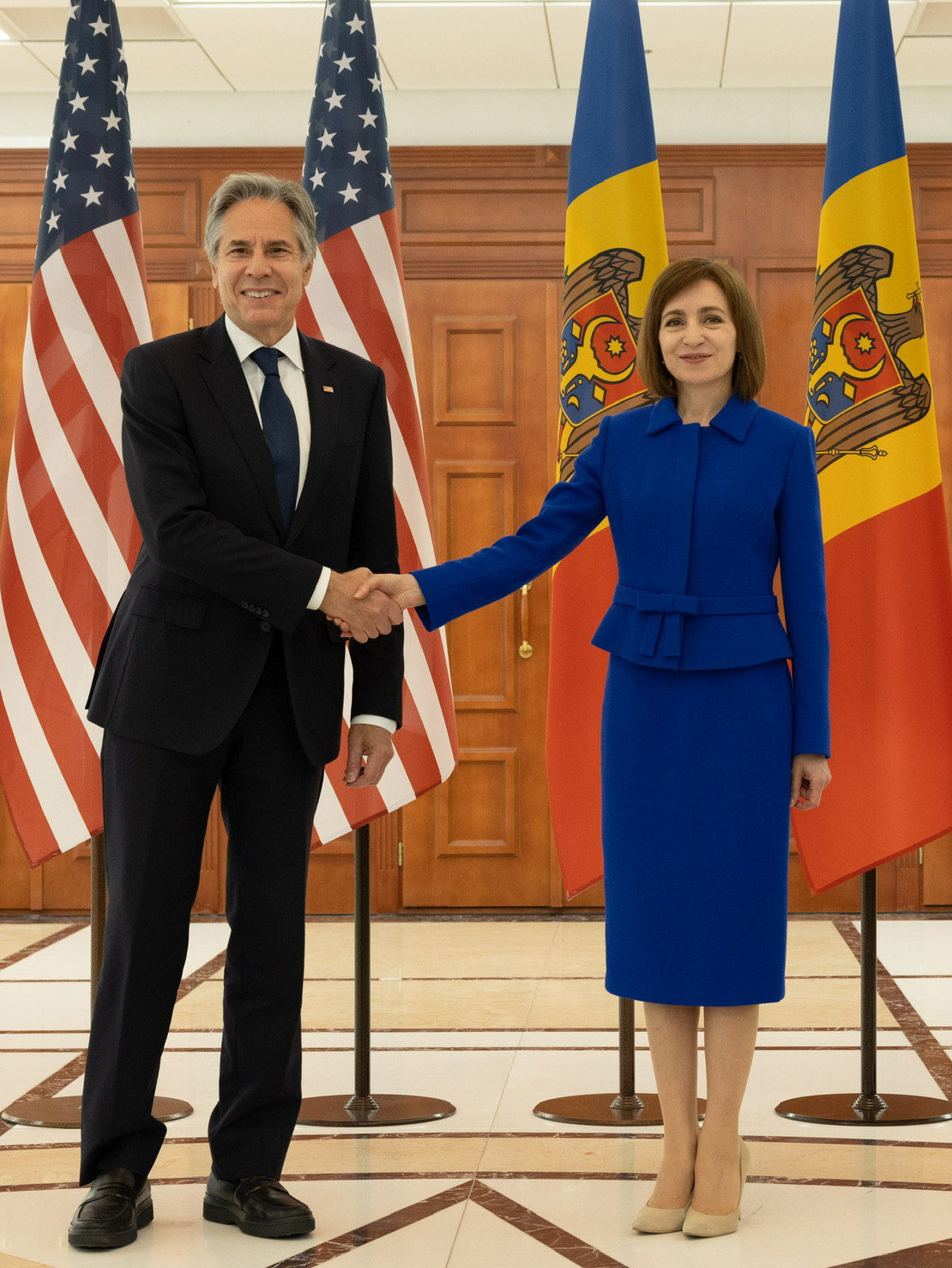
Moldovan President Maia Sandu meets with U.S. Secretary of State Antony Blinken in Chișinău, 29 May 2024

Relations between Moldova and the United States were established on 18 February 1992. According to the 2014 census, there are 37,241 Moldovan-Americans residing in the United States.

== History ==
The United States recognized the independence of Moldova on 25 December 1991, and opened the Embassy of the United States in Chişinău, in March 1992. The Republic of Moldova opened the Embassy of Moldova in Washington, D.C., in December 1993.

A trade agreement providing reciprocal most-favored-nation tariff treatment became effective in July 1992. An Overseas Private Investment Corporation agreement, which encourages U.S. private investment by providing direct loans and loan guarantees, was signed in June 1992. A bilateral investment treaty was signed in April 1993. A generalized system of preferences status was granted in August 1995, and some Eximbank coverage became available in November 1995.

In November 2006, the U.S. Millennium Challenge Corporation approved Moldova's $24.7 million Threshold Country Plan to combat corruption. The MCC also ruled that Moldova is eligible to apply for full compact assistance, and the Government of Moldova is preparing its compact proposal.

In August 2024, the US Army held a trilateral exercise with Moldovan and Romanian forces. The exercise was named Fire Shield 2024 and was scheduled to run between 5 and 24 August. The first such annual exercise was held in 2015.

== Resident diplomatic missions ==
- Moldova has an embassy in Washington, D.C., and consulates-general in Chicago and Sacramento.
- United States has an embassy in Chișinău.
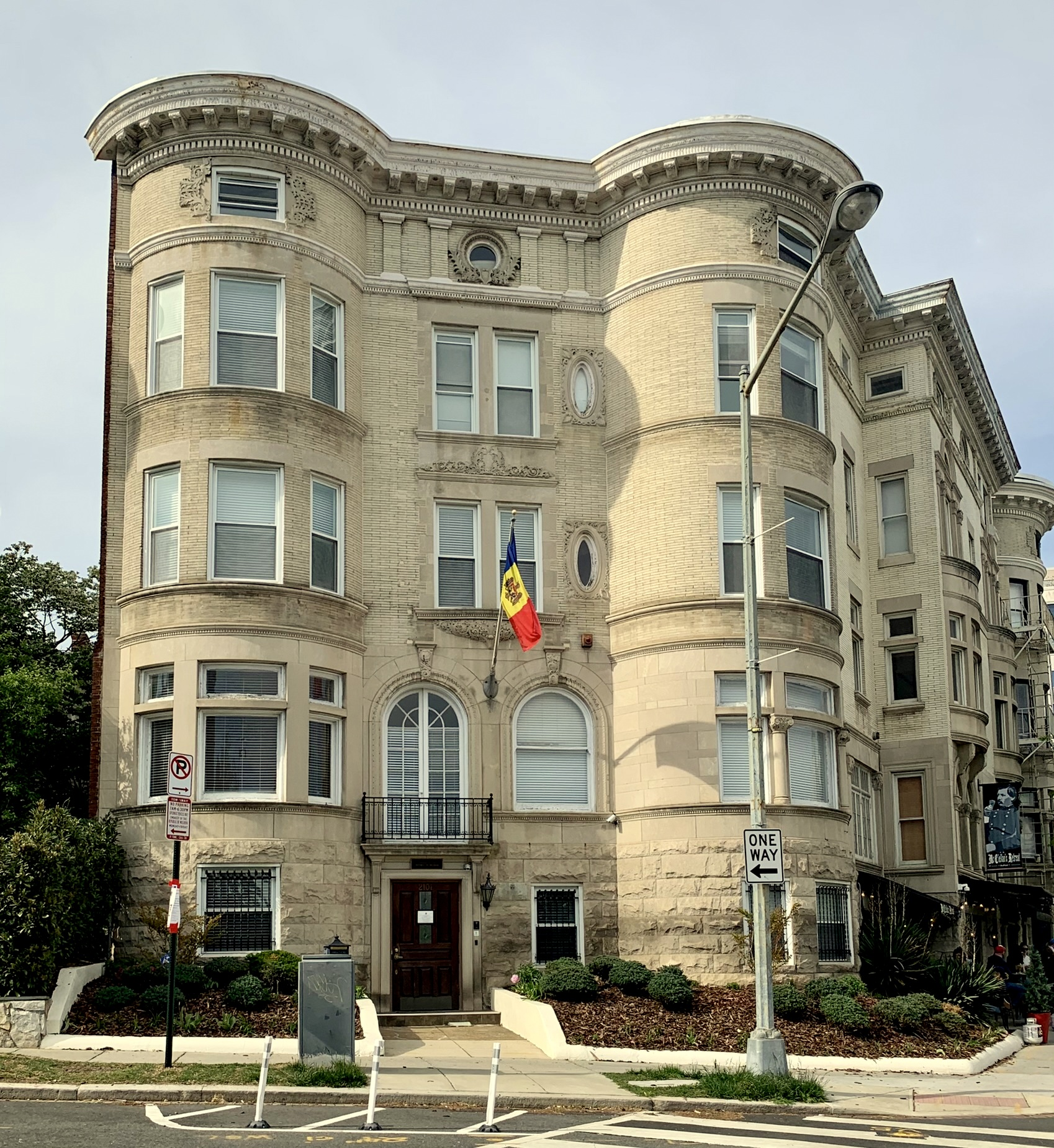
Embassy of Moldova in Washington, D.C.

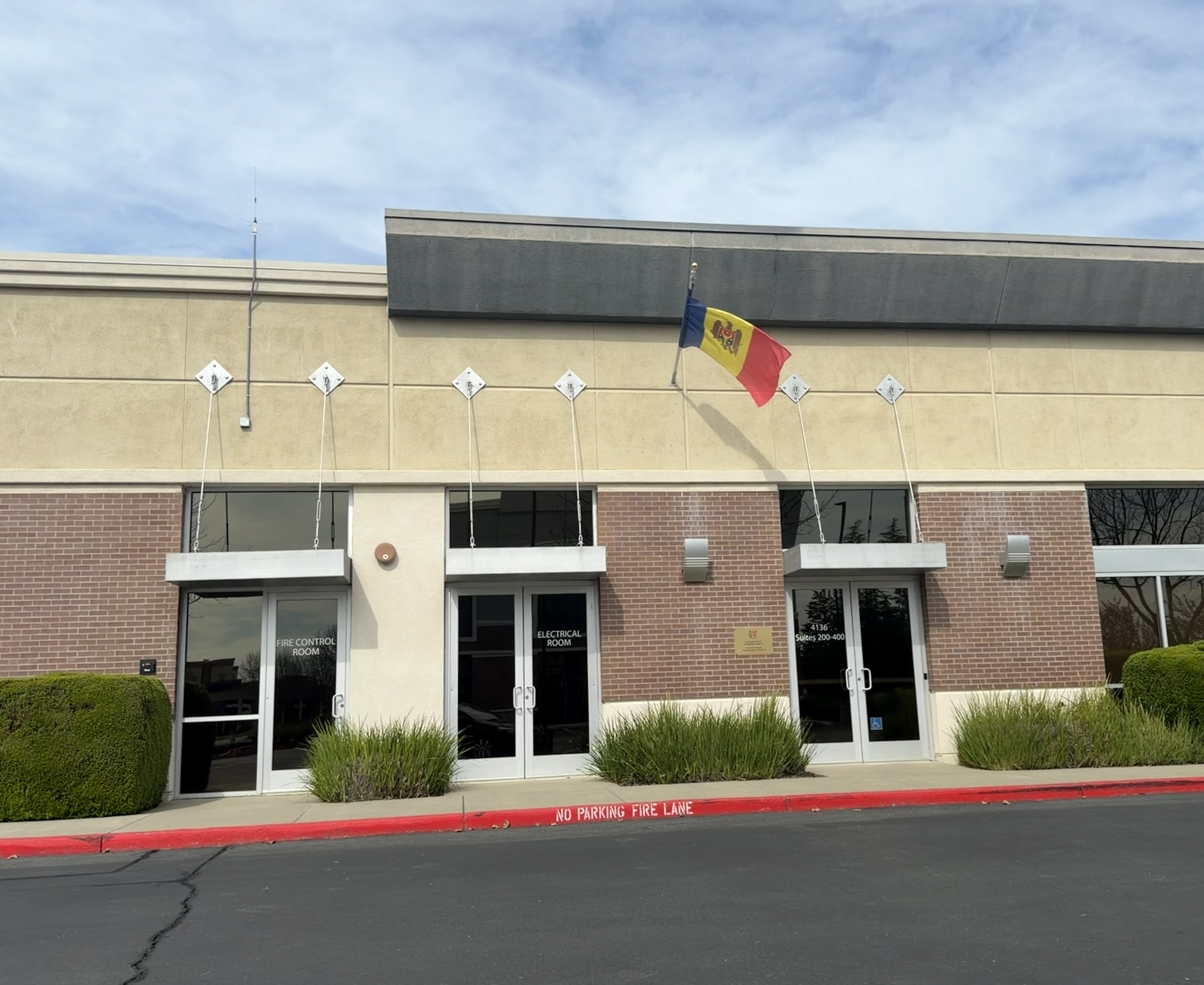
Consulate-General of Moldova in Sacramento

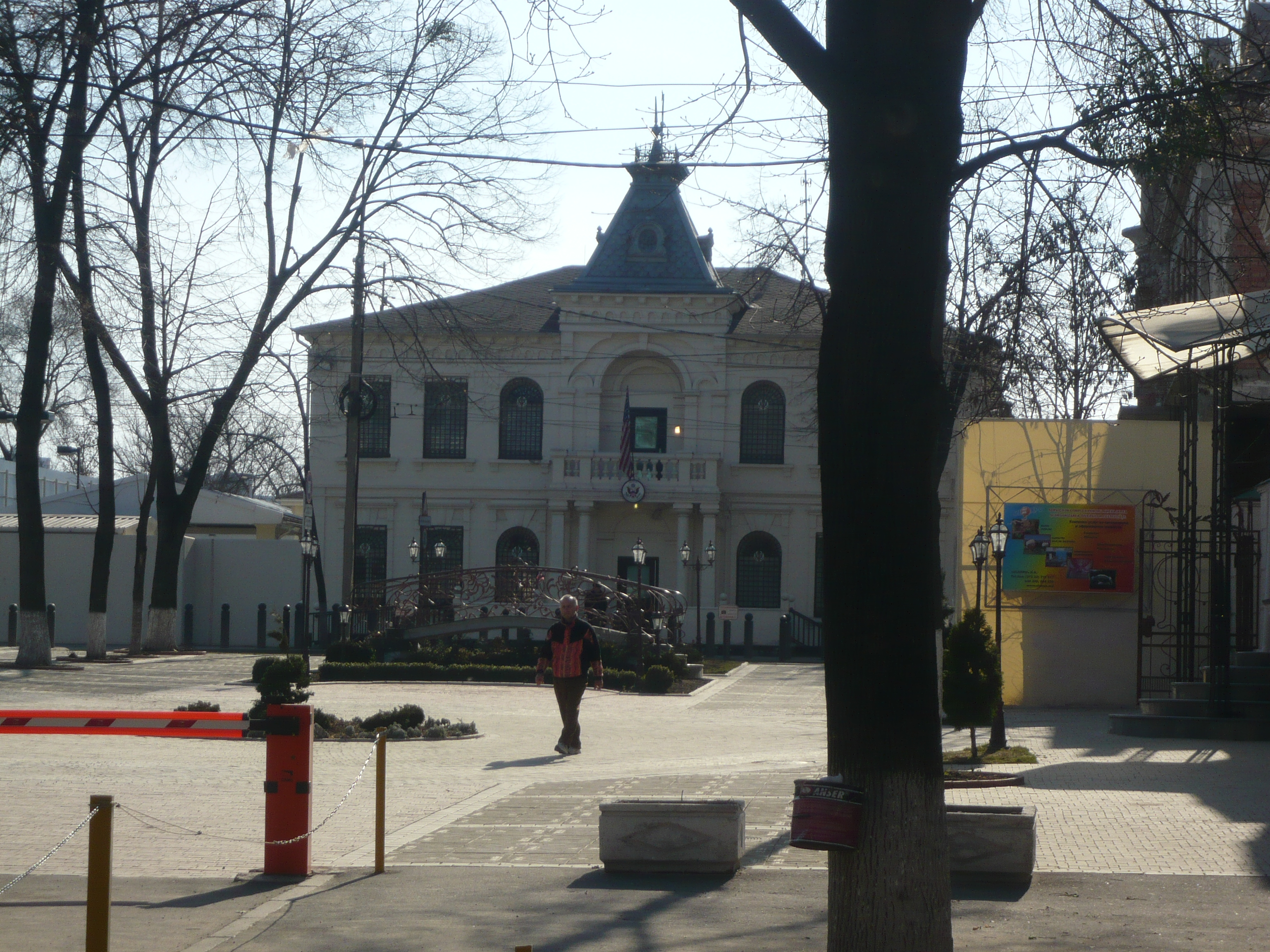
Embassy of the United States in Chișinău

== See also ==
- Foreign relations of Moldova
- Foreign relations of the United States
- List of ambassadors of Moldova to the United States
- List of ambassadors of the United States to Moldova
- Moldovan Americans
- Transnistria–United States relations
- Moldova–Russia relations
- Moldova–NATO relations
