= Embassy of Moldova, Washington, D.C. =

Embassy of Moldova in Washington, D.C.
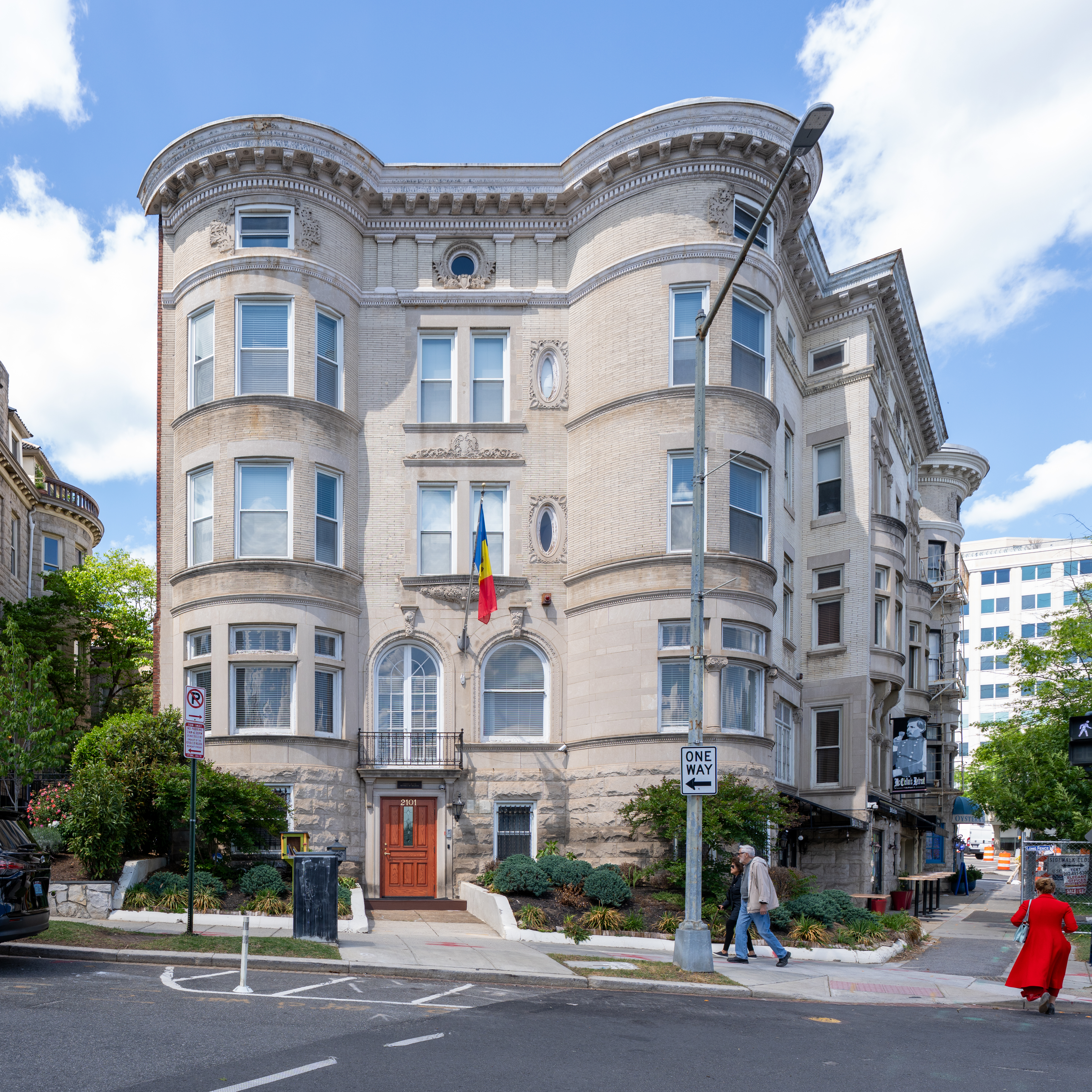
- Embassy of Moldova in 2026
- Location: Washington, D.C.
- Address: 2101 S Street, N.W. Washington, D.C. 20008
- Coordinates: 38°54′51.3″N 77°2′48″W
- Ambassador: Vladislav Kulminski
- Website: Embassy of Moldova in Washington, D.C.

The Embassy of Moldova in Washington, D.C. is the diplomatic mission of the Republic of Moldova to United States. It is located at 2101 S Street, Northwest, Washington, D.C. in the Kalorama neighbourhood.

The embassy provides consular services to Moldova citizens residing or traveling in the US and Canada.

== History ==
The United States of America recognized the independence of Moldova on December 25, 1991, and established diplomatic relations with the Republic of Moldova on February 28, 1992.

The Republic of Moldova opened its embassy in Washington, D.C., in December 1993, after the United States of America opened the Embassy of the United States in Chişinău in March 1992.

== The building ==
Before 1998, the embassy was located at 1511 K Street, Northwest. Since 1998, the Embassy of Moldova is a contributing property to the Sheridan-Kalorama Historic District. The Embassy of Moldova is located at 2101 S Street, NW in the Sheridan-Kalorama neighborhood of Washington, D.C. Its 2009 property value was $1,301,060.

Constructed in 1898, the Beaux-Arts building originally served as the private residence of U.S. Agriculture Secretary James Wilson. In addition to Wilson, notable owners of the building have included the Ottoman Empire (offices of the Turkish Legation), Persian Empire (offices of the Persian Legation during the Qajar dynasty), Assistant Secretary of the Treasury James H. Moyle, Director of the U.S. Reclamation Service Frederick Haynes Newell, economist Alfred E. Kahn, the Scientific Time Sharing Corporation (headquarters), Governor of the U.S. Postal Service Timothy Lionel Jenkins, and American Visions magazine (headquarters).

== Ambassadors ==
Ambassadors of Moldova to the US:

- 1993–1998: Nicolae Țâu
- 1999–2002: Ceslav Ciobanu
- 2002–2006: Mihail Manoli
- 2006–2009: Nicolae Chirtoacă
- 2010–2015: Igor Munteanu
- 2017: Aureliu Ciocoi
- 2018–2019: Cristina Balan
- 2020–2022: Eugen Caras
- 2022–2025: Viorel Ursu
- 2025–present: Vladislav Kulminski

== See also ==
- Moldova–United States relations
- Embassy of the United States, Chișinău
- United States Ambassador to Moldova
- List of diplomatic missions of Moldova
- Moldovan American
