= Anatol Vidrașcu =

Anatol Vidrașcu OR
- Born: 2 April 1949; Costuleni, Moldavian SSR, Soviet Union
- Education: Moldova State University
- Occupation: editor
- Known for: CEO Editorial Group "Litera"
- Political party: Liberal Party
- Relatives: Dan Vidrașcu
- Awards: National Order "Faithful Service"

Anatol Vidrașcu (born 2 April 1949) is an editor and activist from Moldova. He is CEO of the Editorial Group "Litera" and is a leader of the Democratic Forum of Romanians in Moldova.

== Biography ==
Anatol Vidrașcu graduated from the Moldova State University in 1975. Between 1975 and 1989 he worked for "Literatura artistică" publishing house. On 3 May 1989 he created the Editorial Group "Litera". Since 1989, the group has published over 1500 titles.

Anatol Vidrașcu is the president of the European Cultural Institute (Romanian: Institutul Cultural European). He was a leader of the Liberal Party.

== Awards ==
- National Order "Faithful Service" (Romanian: Ordinul naţional "Serviciul Credincios" în grad de comandor), Romania, 2000
