= Costuleni, Ungheni =

Costuleni
- Commune and village
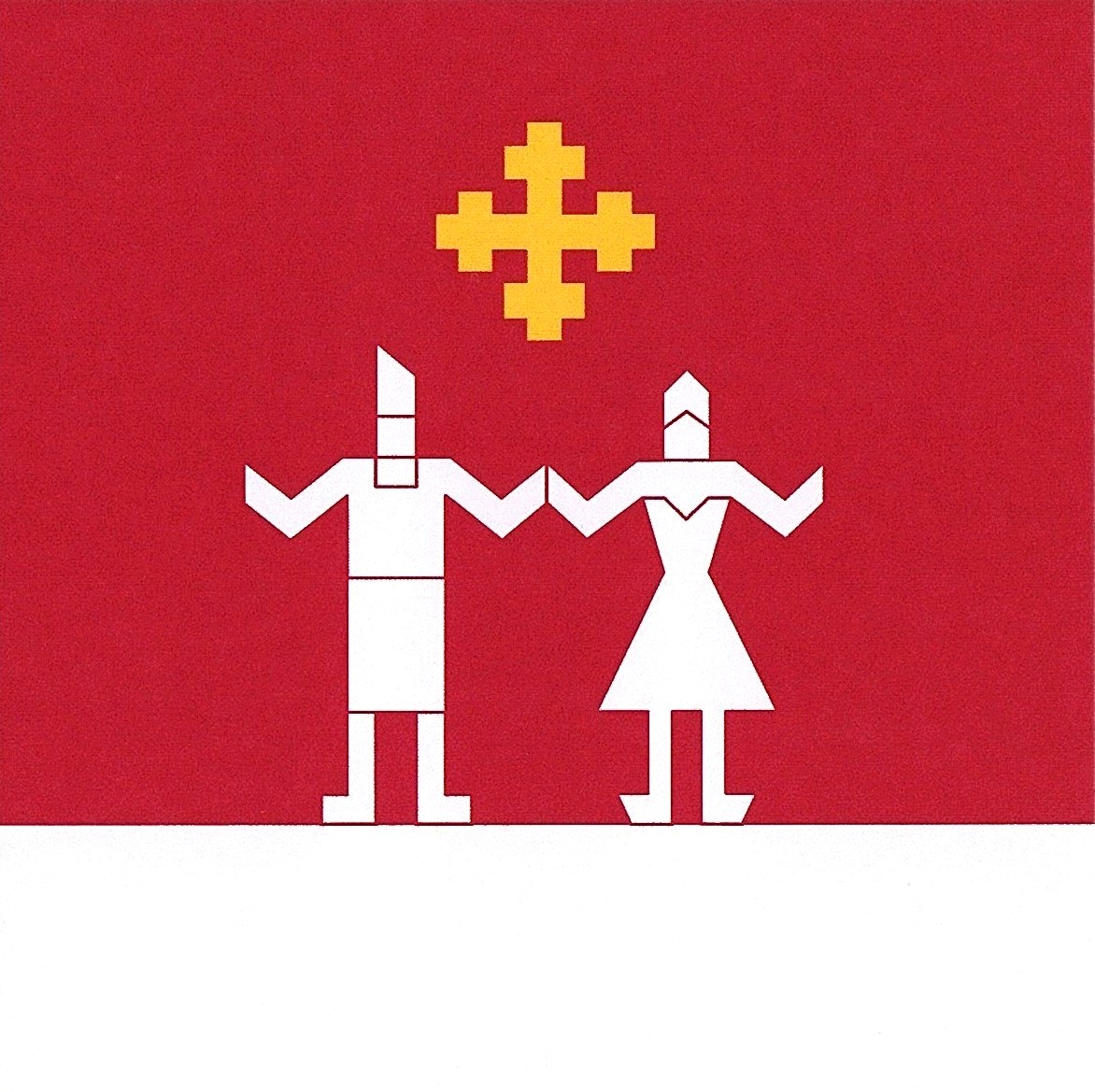
- Flag

- Location in Moldova
- Coordinates: 47°05′N 27°55′E
- Country: Moldova
- District: Ungheni District

Population (2014 census)
  - Total: 3,069
- Time zone: UTC+2 (EET)
  - Summer (DST): UTC+3 (EEST)
- Website: www.costuleni.com

Costuleni is a village in Ungheni District, Moldova.

== Notable people ==
- Iurie Chirinciuc
- Igor Munteanu
- Octavian Țîcu
- Anatol Vidrașcu
