= Igor Munteanu =

Moldovan politician and diplomat

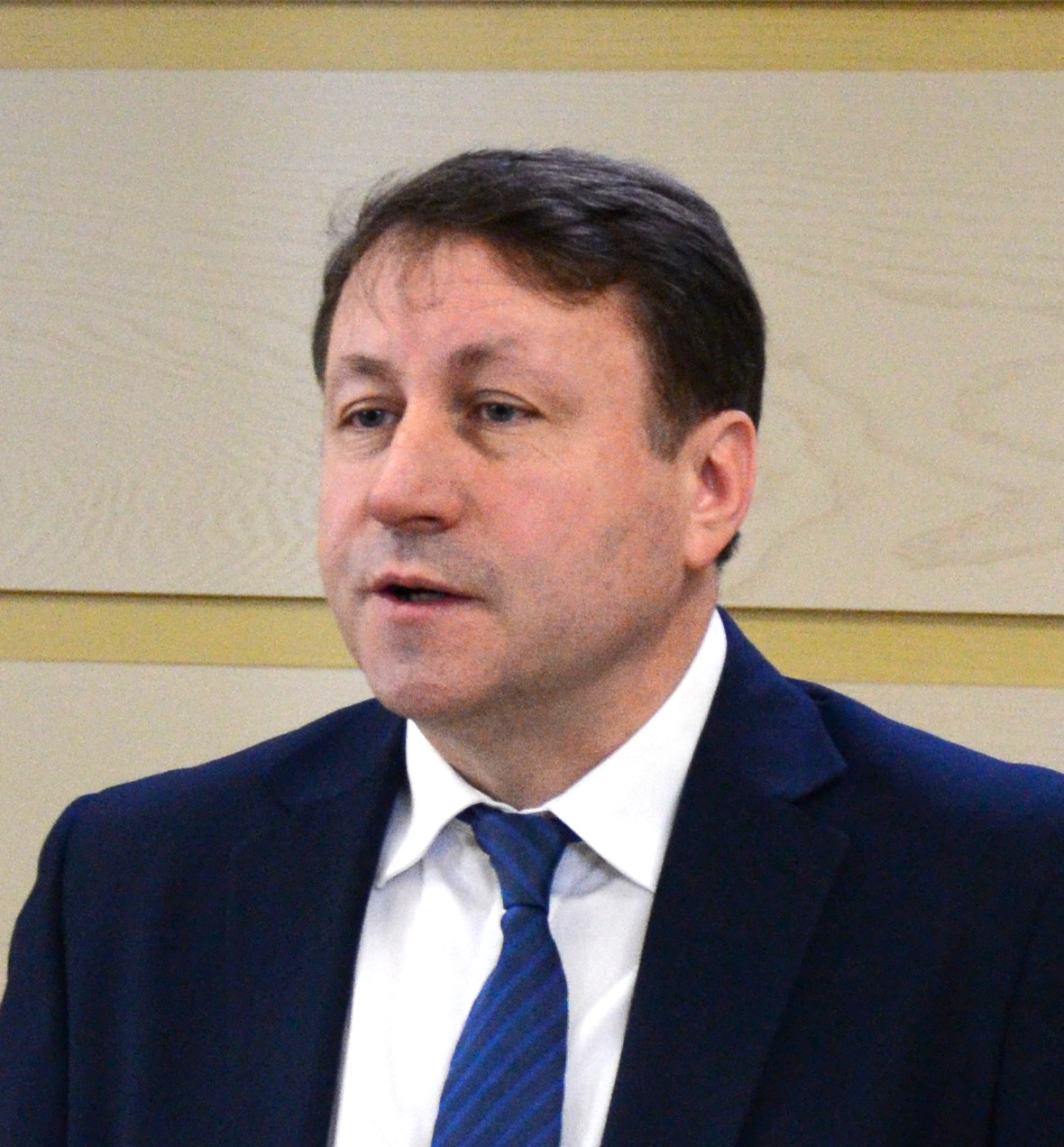
- Munteanu in 2019

President of the Coalition for Unity and Welfare
- In office 5 November 2022 – 12 December 2025

Member of the Moldovan Parliament
- In office 9 March 2019 – 23 July 2021
- Parliamentary group: Dignity and Truth Platform

Moldovan Ambassador to the United States, Canada and Mexico
- In office 16 August 2010 – 15 June 2015
- President: Mihai Ghimpu (acting); Vlad Filat (acting); Marian Lupu (acting); Nicolae Timofti
- Prime Minister: Vlad Filat; Iurie Leancă; Chiril Gaburici
- Preceded by: Nicolae Chirtoacă
- Succeeded by: Aureliu Ciocoi

Personal details
- Born: 10 August 1965 (age 61) Costuleni, Moldavian SSR, Soviet Union
- Citizenship: Moldova; Romania
- Education: Moldova State University
- Occupation: Diplomat, Expert in Public Policy
- Known for: Executive Director of IDIS Viitorul

Igor Munteanu (born 10 August 1965) is a Moldovan politician and diplomat. Between 2010 and 2015, he served as Ambassador of the Republic of Moldova to the United States of America and Mexico from 2010 to 2015 and Ambassador to Canada from 2011 to 2013. From 2016 he is teaching Public Policy and Political Administrative MA Courses at the Academy of Economic Studies (ASEM) in Chisinau.

== Biography ==
Igor Munteanu was born on August 10, 1965, in Costuleni, Ungheni. He holds a Bachelor of Arts degree in Communications and Journalism (1989, Moldova State University), a master's degree in political analysis and administration (1992, Romania's National School of Political and Administrative Studies) and a Doctoral degree in Public Law (2002, Free International University of Moldova). He has expertise in the field of Public Policy, Public sector reform, Regional Development, Political Parties, having as educational background political sciences and law.

Since 1993, Igor Munteanu has established together with a group of young intellectuals of Moldova one of the first think tanks, known as "Viitorul Foundation". The foundation has emerged into a specialized public research institute, IDIS Viitorul. Since 1996, Igor Munteanu has acted as Executive Director of IDIS Viitorul.

He has relevant experience in public policy, electoral laws, regional development. He wrote several books, participating as author in many other collective publications. He served as Senior Expert in the Institutional Committee of the Council of Europe on local governmental affairs (2002-2008). He worked also with Freedom House, UN agencies (UNOPS, UNDP, UNICEF) and OECD. He cooperated with Bertelsmann Foundation (BTI) and World Integrity Survey (WIS). With OSI/LGI, Igor Munteanu co-chaired editorial work on anthologies of systems of public administration in ex-Soviet space, Old Rules under New Environment. He wrote articles on Eastern Partnership Policy of the EU and continues to be interested in researching foreign policy, regional security studies, NATO-Russia. He lectured at ASEM (2004-2008) and ULIM in 2014 in delivering courses in Political-Administrative Institutions and Public Policy.

Prior to his diplomatic assignment, Munteanu served as Independent Expert to the Congress of Local and Regional Authorities of the Council of Europe (2001-2008), monitoring the status of local and regional autonomy in several countries of the Council of Europe. Igor Munteanu wrote several publications for the national and international audience on governmental affairs, decentralization, foreign policy, post-Soviet transformation. Igor Munteanu has written and edited several publications, being actively engaged as free lance author with Radio Free Europe (1997–2005). He served as independent expert of the Congress of Local and Regional Authorities of the Council of Europe between 2003 and 2008. Munteanu is a strong proponent of European integration and advocates Moldova becoming a member of the European Union. Munteanu designed and launched the publishing of the Arena Politicii Journal, as the first political sciences and foreign affairs journal in Moldova (1996-2000). In 2007, Munteanu served as a member of the International Board for the BSTF (Black Sea Trust Fund) and also a Member of the External evaluation committee of the Balkan Trust for Democracy (BTD).

He was elected member of Parliament of Moldova in the 2019 parliamentary election running as independent within the ACUM Electoral Bloc.
