= Viorel Ursu =

Moldovan diplomat

Moldovan Ambassador to Sweden, Iceland, Norway and Finland
- Incumbent
- Assumed office 8 August 2025
- President: Maia Sandu
- Prime Minister: Dorin Recean; Alexandru Munteanu; Eugen Osmochescu (acting); Vasile Tofan
- Preceded by: Liliana Guțan

Moldovan Ambassador to the United States and Mexico
- In office 30 May 2022 – 24 June 2025
- President: Maia Sandu
- Prime Minister: Natalia Gavrilița; Dorin Recean
- Preceded by: Eugen Caras
- Succeeded by: Vladislav Kulminski

Personal details
- Born: Chișinău, Moldavian SSR, Soviet Union
- Education: Moldova State University; College of Europe

Viorel Ursu is a Moldovan diplomat. He is the current Moldovan ambassador to Sweden.
