= Nicolae Țâu =

Moldovan politician (born 1948)

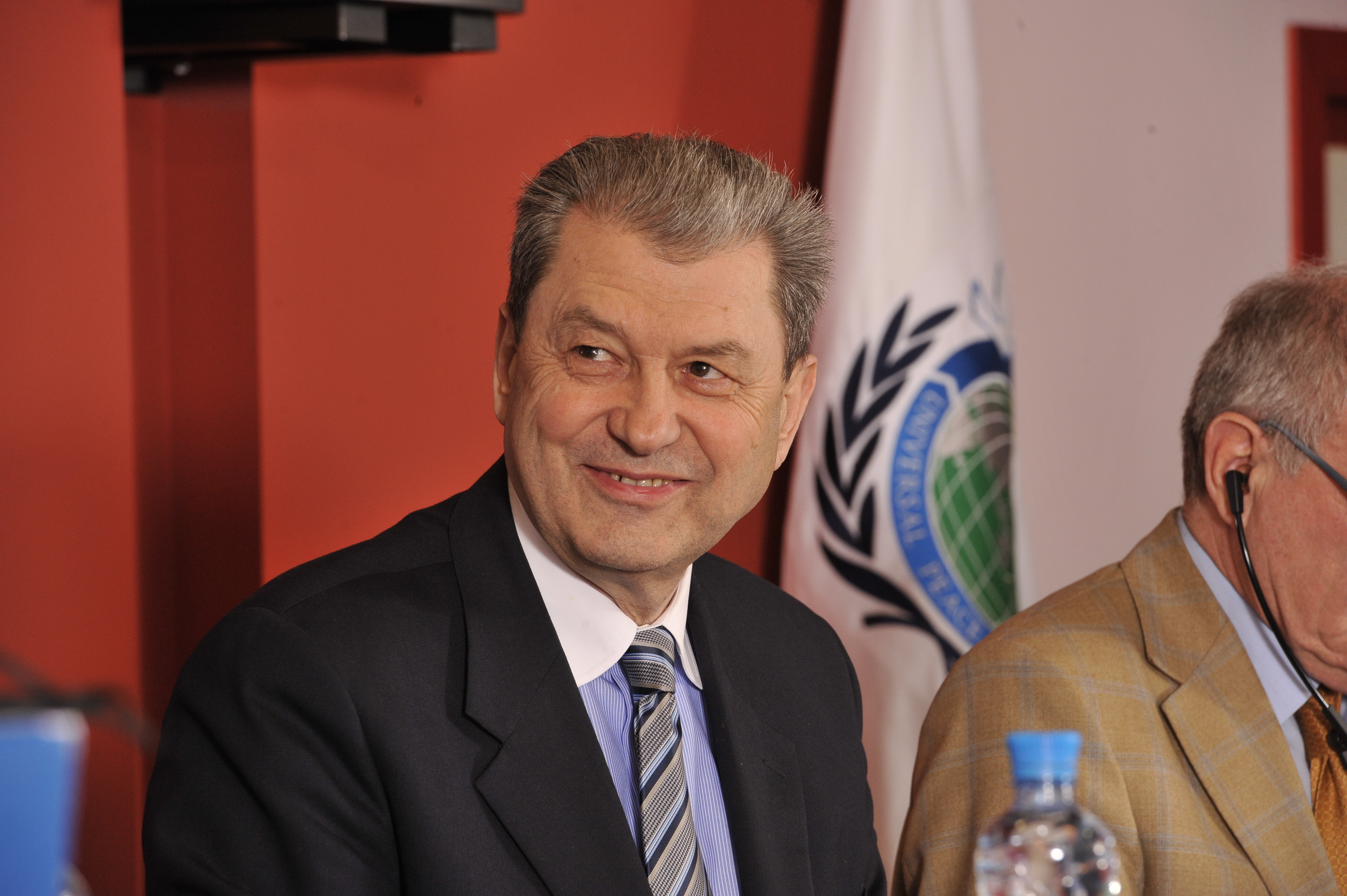
- Țâu in 2012

1st Moldovan Ambassador to the United States, Canada and Mexico
- In office 28 October 1993 – 13 July 1998
- President: Mircea Snegur; Petru Lucinschi
- Prime Minister: Andrei Sangheli; Ion Ciubuc
- Succeeded by: Ceslav Ciobanu

1st Minister of Foreign Affairs
- In office 6 June 1990 – 28 October 1993
- President: Mircea Snegur
- Prime Minister: Mircea Druc; Valeriu Muravschi; Andrei Sangheli
- Preceded by: Petru Comendant (as Minister of Foreign Affairs of the Moldavian SSR)
- Succeeded by: Mihai Popov

People's Deputy of the Soviet Union
- In office 26 March 1989 – 6 June 1990
- Constituency: Chișinău

Personal details
- Born: 25 March 1948 (age 78) Andrușul de Jos, Moldavian SSR, Soviet Union
- Profession: diplomat

Nicolae Țâu (pronunciation: [tsɨu], born 25 March 1948) is a Moldovan politician who was Foreign Minister of Moldova between 1990 and 1993.
