= Eugen Caras =

Moldovan diplomat

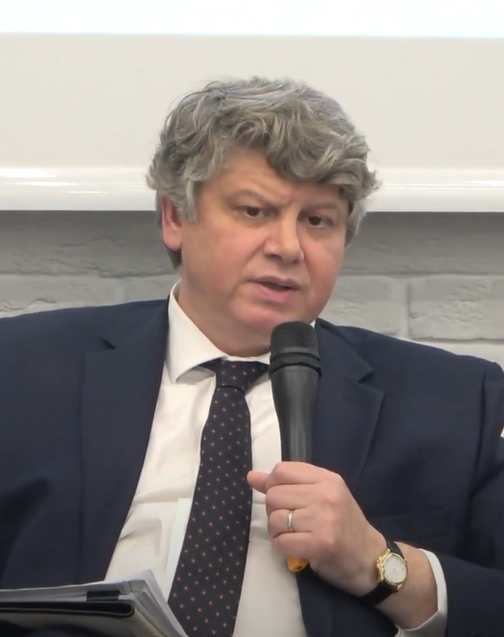
- Caras in 2023

Moldovan Ambassador to Estonia
- Incumbent
- Assumed office 31 July 2024
- President: Maia Sandu
- Prime Minister: Dorin Recean; Alexandru Munteanu; Eugen Osmochescu (acting); Vasile Tofan
- Preceded by: Ion Stăvilă

Moldovan Ambassador to the United States and Mexico
- In office 16 March 2020 – 30 May 2022
- President: Igor Dodon; Maia Sandu
- Prime Minister: Ion Chicu; Aureliu Ciocoi (acting); Natalia Gavrilița
- Preceded by: Cristina Balan
- Succeeded by: Viorel Ursu

Foreign Policy Advisor to the President
- In office 27 December 2011 – 10 July 2019
- President: Igor Dodon
- Preceded by: Aureliu Ciocoi
- Succeeded by: Aureliu Ciocoi

Moldovan Ambassador and Head of the Mission to the European Union
- In office 27 December 2011 – 10 July 2019
- President: Marian Lupu (acting); Nicolae Timofti; Igor Dodon
- Prime Minister: Vlad Filat; Iurie Leancă; Chiril Gaburici; Natalia Gherman (acting); Valeriu Streleț; Gheorghe Brega (acting); Pavel Filip; Maia Sandu
- Preceded by: Daniela Cujbă
- Succeeded by: Daniela Morari

Personal details
- Born: 11 May 1971 (age 55) Sîngerei, Moldavian SSR, Soviet Union
- Education: Alecu Russo State University of Bălți; College of Europe; Alexandru Ioan Cuza University

Eugen Caras (born 11 May 1971) is a Moldovan diplomat. He is currently serving as the Moldovan Ambassador to Estonia. He served as the Moldovan Ambassador to the United States. He also served as foreign policy adviser for former President of Moldova Igor Dodon, as head of the Mission of Moldova to the European Union, as the Moldovan Ambassador to Belgium and in diplomatic missions in Ukraine, the United States, and Turkey.

== See also ==
- List of ambassadors of Moldova to the United States
