= Nicolae Chirtoacă =

Moldovan political analyst and diplomat

Moldovan Ambassador to the United States, Canada, Brazil and Mexico
- In office 4 August 2006 – 17 December 2009
- President: Vladimir Voronin; Mihai Ghimpu (acting)
- Prime Minister: Vasile Tarlev; Zinaida Greceanîi; Vitalie Pîrlog (acting); Vladimir Filat
- Preceded by: Mihail Manoli
- Succeeded by: Igor Munteanu

Personal details
- Born: 22 March 1953 (age 73) Glodeni, Moldavian SSR, Soviet Union

Military service
- Allegiance: Soviet Union; Moldova
- Branch/service: Soviet Union Army; Moldovan Ground Forces
- Years of service: 1977–1994
- Battles/wars: Transnistria War

Nicolae Chirtoacă (born 22 March 1953) is a Moldovan political analyst and diplomat. He served as the Moldovan Ambassador to the United States from 2006 to 2009. During the Transnistria War, Chirtoacă led the State Department for Military Problems, and he was involved in the elaboration of a ceasefire agreement that put an end to the war.
