= Vladislav Kulminski =

Moldovan politician (born 1972)

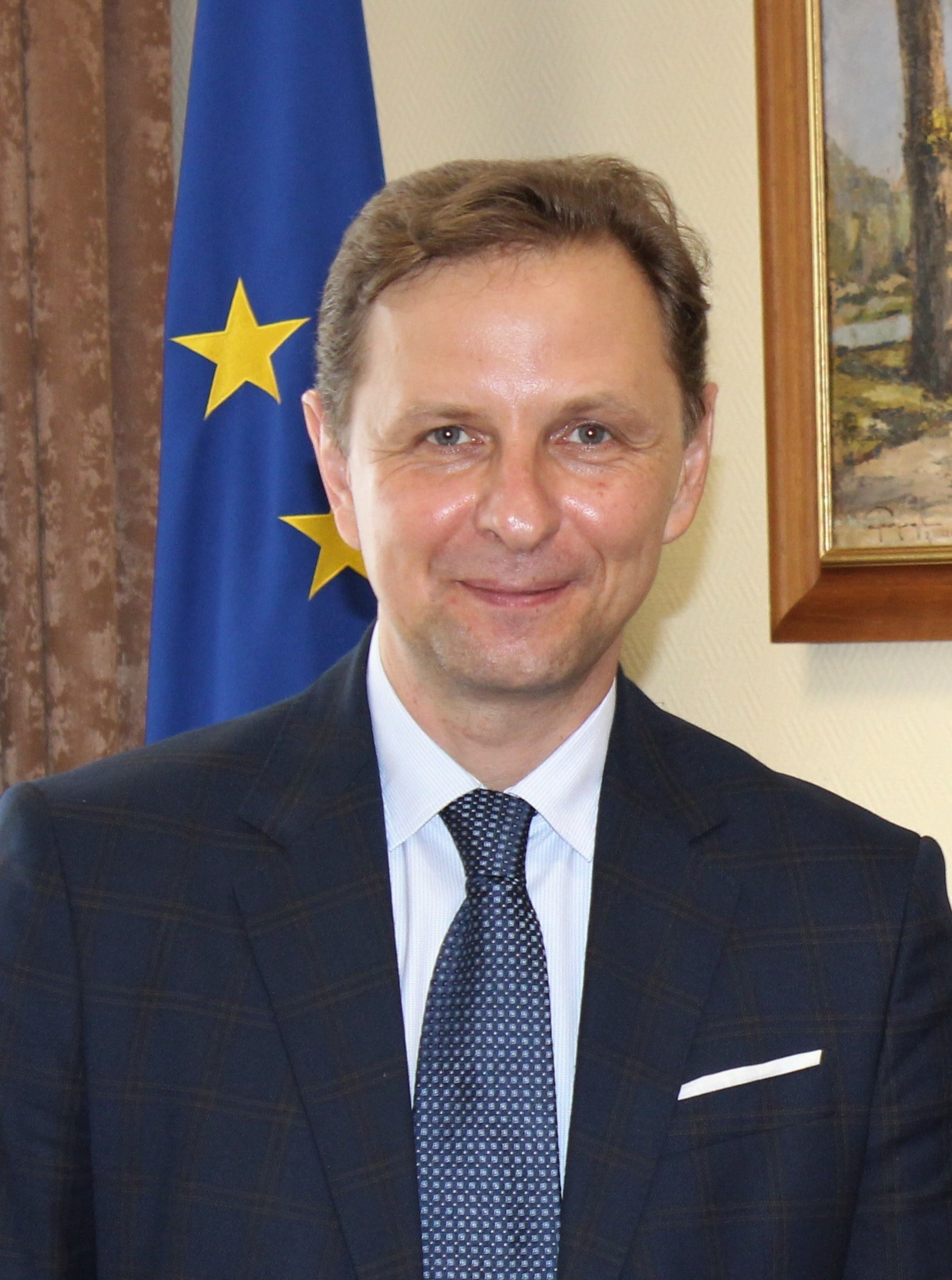
- Kulminski in 2021

Moldovan Ambassador to the United States and Mexico
- Incumbent
- Assumed office 30 June 2025
- President: Maia Sandu
- Prime Minister: Dorin Recean; Alexandru Munteanu; Eugen Osmochescu (acting); Vasile Tofan
- Preceded by: Viorel Ursu

Deputy Prime Minister of Moldova for Reintegration
- In office 6 August 2021 – 5 November 2021
- President: Maia Sandu
- Prime Minister: Natalia Gavrilița
- Preceded by: Olga Cebotari
- Succeeded by: Oleg Serebrian

Secretary of State of the Ministry of Foreign Affairs and European Integration
- In office 23 October 2019 – 19 November 2019
- President: Igor Dodon
- Prime Minister: Maia Sandu; Ion Chicu
- Minister: Nicu Popescu; Aureliu Ciocoi

Personal details
- Born: 24 October 1972 (age 53)
- Education: Maxwell School of Citizenship and Public Affairs; Central European University

Vladislav Kulminski (born 24 October 1972) is a Moldovan politician. He is the current Moldovan Ambassador to the United States and Mexico.

== Biography ==
Vladislav Kulminski was born on 24 October 1972. He has been referred to as an expert in internal affairs and national security. Furthermore, as of 2021, he was president of the Institute for Strategic Initiatives (IPIS). Kulminski has also worked on the World Bank on issues related to Moldova.

Kulminski was secretary of state for the Ministry of Foreign Affairs and European Integration of Moldova. He was also designated as a member of the Supreme Security Council on 25 January 2021 by the President of Moldova Maia Sandu.

On 6 August 2021, Kulminski was appointed as the Deputy Prime Minister for Reintegration of the Bureau for Reintegration of the Republic of Moldova, that is, the principal negotiator of the Transnistria conflict on the Moldovan side. However, he resigned shortly after, on 5 November 2021. He would later clarify that he had left this position due to the birth of his son and the difficulties his wife had been experiencing after giving birth, which made him want to spend more time with his family. He also stated that he had already clarified to Moldovan officials that he would probably make this decision weeks before his formal resignation. Afterwards, Oleg Serebrian was appointed as Kulminski's successor as Deputy Prime Minister for Reintegration on 19 January 2022.
