= Aureliu Ciocoi =

Moldovan diplomat and politician

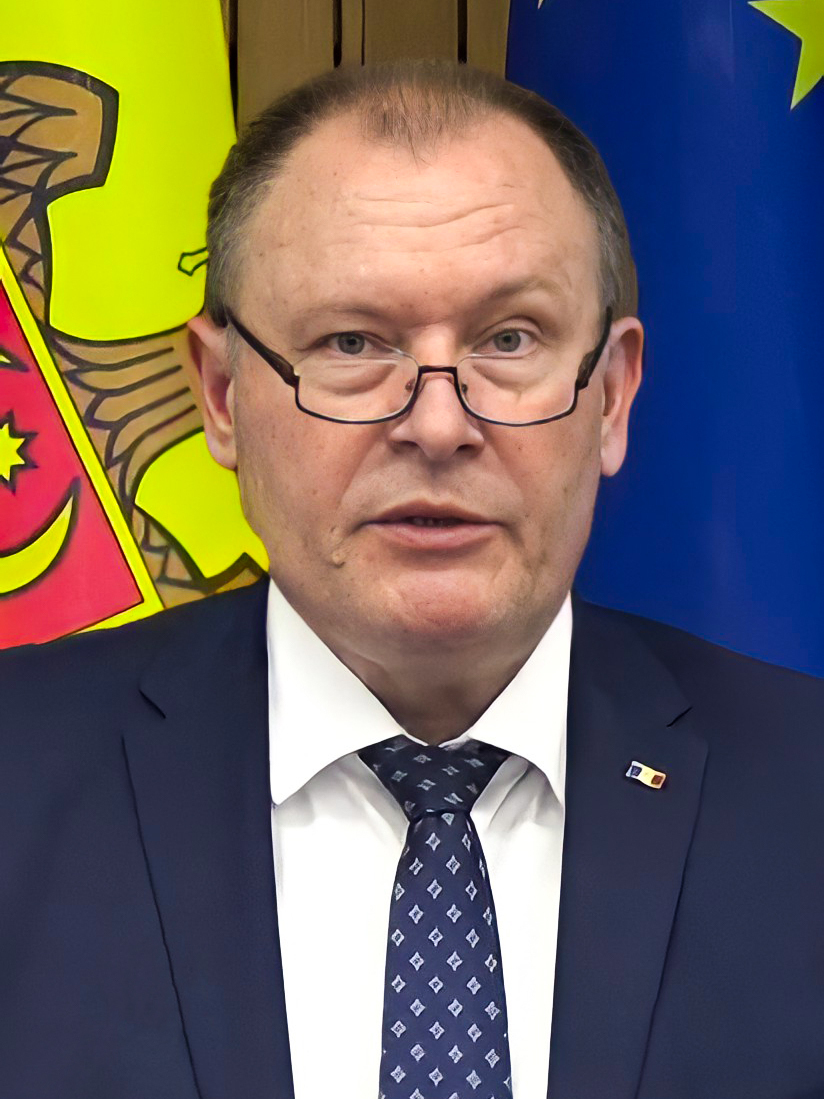
- Ciocoi in 2021

Moldovan Ambassador to Germany
- Incumbent
- Assumed office 20 December 2021
- President: Maia Sandu
- Prime Minister: Natalia Gavrilița; Dorin Recean; Alexandru Munteanu; Eugen Osmochescu (acting); Vasile Tofan
- Preceded by: Oleg Serebrian
- In office 21 June 2010 – 16 June 2015
- President: Mihai Ghimpu (acting); Vlad Filat (acting); Marian Lupu (acting); Nicolae Timofti
- Prime Minister: Vlad Filat; Chiril Gaburici
- Preceded by: Igor Corman
- Succeeded by: Oleg Serebrian

Acting Prime Minister of Moldova
- In office 31 December 2020 – 6 August 2021
- President: Maia Sandu
- Deputy: Olga Cebotari
- Preceded by: Ion Chicu
- Succeeded by: Natalia Gavrilița

Minister of Foreign Affairs and European Integration
- In office 9 November 2020 – 6 August 2021
- President: Igor Dodon; Maia Sandu
- Prime Minister: Ion Chicu
- Preceded by: Oleg Țulea
- Succeeded by: Nicu Popescu
- In office 14 November 2019 – 16 March 2020
- President: Igor Dodon
- Prime Minister: Ion Chicu
- Preceded by: Nicu Popescu
- Succeeded by: Oleg Țulea

Foreign Policy Advisor to the President
- In office 17 March 2020 – 9 November 2020
- President: Igor Dodon
- Preceded by: Eugen Caras
- Succeeded by: Cristina Gherasimov
- In office 26 April 2018 – 14 November 2019
- President: Igor Dodon
- Preceded by: Andrei Neguța
- Succeeded by: Eugen Caras

Moldovan Ambassador to the United States
- In office 10 July 2017 – 14 November 2017
- President: Igor Dodon
- Prime Minister: Pavel Filip
- Preceded by: Igor Munteanu
- Succeeded by: Cristina Balan

Moldovan Ambassador to China and Vietnam
- In office 23 November 2015 – 7 June 2017
- President: Nicolae Timofti; Igor Dodon
- Prime Minister: Gheorghe Brega (acting); Pavel Filip
- Preceded by: Anatolie Urecheanu
- Succeeded by: Denis Jelimalai

Personal details
- Born: 5 June 1968 (age 58) Chișinău, Moldavian SSR, Soviet Union (now Moldova)
- Party: Independent
- Children: 1
- Education: Moldova State University; National University of Political Studies and Public Administration

Aureliu Ciocoi (Romanian: [a.uˈrelju tʃjoˈkoj]; born 5 June 1968) is a Moldovan diplomat and politician who served as Acting Prime Minister of Moldova from December 2020 to August 2021. He is currently the country's ambassador to Germany. Prior positions that Ciocoi held include being the country's Minister of Foreign Affairs and former ambassador to the United States, China and Vietnam.

Ciocoi was named acting prime minister on 31 December 2020 after Ion Chicu, who submitted his resignation a week earlier, refused to stay on in an acting capacity until a new government was formed.

== Biography ==
Aureliu Ciocoi was born on 5 June 1968 in Chișinău. He graduated from the Primary, Secondary and High School No. 11 (today the Lyceum "Ion Creangă"). From 1986 to 1988, he was a soldier in the Soviet Border Troops of the KGB. Between 1985 and 1992, he studied at the Faculty of Journalism and Communication Sciences of the Moldova State University. From 1992 to 1994, he studied at the Faculty of International Relations of the National University of Political Studies and Public Administration in Bucharest, Romania. While studying at the university, he worked at the Central Publishing House in Chișinău.

After the fall of the Soviet Union, he became a journalist for several daily newspapers. He worked as ambassador to Germany and Denmark from 2010 to 2015, as well as to China and Vietnam from 2015 to 2017. He also briefly served as ambassador to the United States in 2017. From 2018 to 2019, he was an adviser to President Igor Dodon on foreign policy issues. After resigning from the cabinet on 9 November, he was appointed as foreign minister once again. On 31 December 2020, President Maia Sandu appointed him as interim prime minister after Prime Minister Ion Chicu resigned on 23 December.

== Personal life ==
He is married and has one child. He speaks fluent Romanian, Russian, English, German, and French. He was a sportsman in the 1980s, being a Master of Sport of the USSR and a member of the Moldovan national junior team in shooting. His hobbies include philosophy, literature, and theatre.

== Awards ==
- Great Cross of Merit of the Federal Republic of Germany (November 2015)
