= Eusebius Mandyczewski =

Romanian musicologist, composer and conductor (1857–1929)

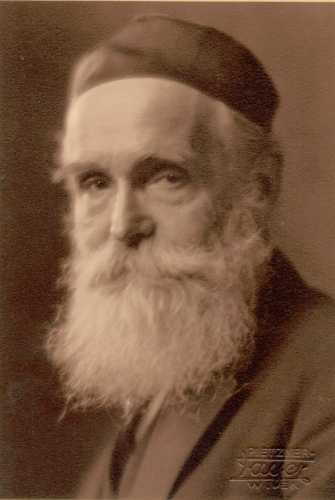
- Born: 18 August 1857; Bahrinești or Molodiia, Duchy of Bukovina, Austrian Empire
- Died: 13 July 1929 (71 years old); Vienna, First Austrian Republic
- Occupations: composer, professor, musicologist, conductor

Winterreise, from Series XX, Volume 9 of Franz Schubert's Werke, edited by Eusebius Mandyczewski

Eusebius Mandyczewski (Ukrainian: Євсевій Мандичевський, romanized: Yevsevii Mandychevskyi, Romanian: Eusebie Mandicevschi; 18 August 1857, in Molodiia – 13 August 1929, in Vienna) was a Romanian musicologist, composer, conductor, and teacher. He was an author of numerous musical works and is highly regarded within Austrian, Romanian and Ukrainian music circles.

== Personal life ==
Eusebius Mandyczewski was born in the village of Bahrynivka (Ukrainian: Багринівка; Romanian: Bahrinești) (then Austria-Hungary; now Ukraine, Hlyboka Raion) on 18 August 1857. His father was a priest and his mother, Veronica, born Popovici, was the sister of Eusebiu Popovici, erudite professor of history at the University of Cernauti and the father of the Bucovinian poet Gheorghe Popovici (known under the pen name of T. Robeanu). His origin according to the father has Slavic affiliations; according to his mother the origin is Romanian. Eusebius had two brothers (Georgiy and Prof. Kostiantyn) and one sister (Kateryna). Kostiantyn was a secondary school teacher, member of the regional School Council and later Head of the Chernivtsi Library. Kateryna Mandychevs'ka was a school teacher. Georgiy was also a composer of choral music.

He finished his secondary studies at the upper school of Chernivtsi and simultaneously studied music under Sydir Vorobkevych. He began studies at the Chernivtsi University, then moved to the Vienna Conservatory in 1875 and studied music history under Eduard Hanslick, music theory under Gustav Nottebohm and Robert Fuchs. Beginning in 1879, he became a close and lifelong friend of Johannes Brahms and a prominent member of the 'Brahms circle' (who aided Brahms in teaching Gustav Jenner). Johannes Brahms supported the young composer and appointed him as curator of his estate.

In 1901, he married Albine von Vest, a Lieder singer and singing teacher.

== Career ==
From 1879 to 1881, Mandyczewski was the conductor of the Vienna Singakademie. From 1887 to 1929, he was the archivist and librarian of the Gesellschaft der Musikfreunde. In 1892 he became director of the Gesellschaft der Musikfreunde orchestra.

The decade from 1887 to 1897 saw the appearance of Mandyczewski's work on the Schubert Gesamtausgabe. His name is particularly associated with the ten volumes of songs, which he edited meticulously, sometimes printing as many as three or four variants of individual songs; in recognition of his editorship he was awarded an honorary doctorate from the University of Leipzig in 1897. A gifted philologist as well as musician, he was widely respected both for his scholarship and for his generosity to inquiring scholars; Grove was indebted to him for his help in the writing of his book on Beethoven's symphonies. Mandyczewski also brought out a second volume of Nottebohm’s Beethoveniana, a series of pioneering essays in Beethoven scholarship that had been partly published in series in the Musikalisches Wochenblatt and partly left in manuscript.

In 1897 he received an Honorary Doctorate from the University of Leipzig. Later in 1897, he began teaching at the Vienna Conservatory as Professor of Music History and Musical Instruments. In 1916 he was made a Privy Councillor. His students included Hans Gál and Florica Racovitză-Flondor.

Mandyczewski edited the complete edition of Franz Schubert's works, began a complete edition of Joseph Haydn's and, together with his pupil Hans Gál, edited Brahms's complete works.

For many years in the early part of the 20th century he was the Viennese correspondent to the Musical Times. He was joint editor of the Brahms Gesamtausgabe with Hans Gál, and organized the Schubert exhibition of 1922 and the International Schubert Congress (1928); this last function greatly overtaxed his strength, and he died before the proceedings of the congress were published.

Mandyczewski composed music to the words of poets such as Taras Shevchenko, Yuriy Fedkovych, Vasile Alecsandri, Mihai Eminescu, and Heinrich Heine. He arranged compositions based on many Ukrainian, Romanian, German, and Hungarian folk songs.

A Romanian citizen after 1918, he chose to remain in Vienna. Nonetheless, he continued to engage in the Romanian cultural and musical life, working with local artists and often visiting the country. Mandyczewski died in Sulz near Vienna, Austria on 13 August 1929.

== Writings ==
- Nottebohm MG, ed, 'Zweite Beethoveniana' (Leipzig, 1887, 2/1925)
- 'Namen- und Sachregister zu Nottebohms Beethoveniana und Zweite Beethoveniana' (Leipzig, 1888/R)
- ‘Beethoven’s Rondo in B für Pianoforte und Orchester’, SIMG, i (1899–1900), 250–306
- ‘Carl Czerny: Versuch einer richtigen Würdigung’, Deutsche Kunst- und Musikzeitung, xviii/23–4 (1891)
- ‘Goethes Gedichte in Franz Schuberts Werken’, Chronik des Wiener Goethe-Vereins, xi/112 (10 March 1897), 2–3
- ‘Franz Schubert: zur Erinnerung an seinen 100. Geburtstag’, Mitteilung Breitkopf & Härtel, xlviii (1907), 1609–10
- ‘Jägers Abendlied’, Die Musik, vi/7 (1907), 45–6
- 'Schubert-Pflege in der Gesellschaft der Musikfreunde’, Geschichte der k.k. Gesellschaft der Musikfreunde (Vienna, 1912)
- 'Drei Meister Autographe' (Vienna, 1923) [facs. of autographs of Beethoven, Schubert and Brahms]
- ‘Brahms’, ‘Bruckner’, ‘Pohl’, ‘Strauss, Johann, Vater’, ‘Strauss, Johann, Sohn’, ADB

== Editions ==
- 'Ludwig van Beethovens Werke: vollständige kritisch durchgesehene überall berechtigte Ausgabe', 25th ser., nos.264–309 (Leipzig, 1887/R)
- 'Franz Schuberts Werke: kritisch durchgesehene Gesamtausgabe', 20th ser., i–x (Leipzig, 1895–7/R) and Revisionsbericht (Leipzig, 1897/R)
- Antonio Caldara: 'Kirchenwerke', DTÖ, xxvi, Jg.xii/2 (1906/R)
- 'Joseph Haydns Werke: erste kritische durchgesehene Gesamtausgabe', 16th ser., v–vii [Die Schöpfung and Die Jahreszeiten] (Leipzig, 1922)
- 'Johannes Brahms sämtliche Werke', xi–xxvi (Leipzig, 1926–7/R)
- 'A. Caldara: Kammermusik für Gesang', DTÖ, lxxv, Jg.xxxix (1932/R)
