= Nicolae Osmochescu =

Moldovan academic and diplomat (born 1944)

Nicolae Osmochescu OR

Moldovan Ambassador to Uzbekistan, Tajikistan and Kyrgyzstan
- In office 27 February 1998 – 30 March 2001
- President: Petru Lucinschi
- Prime Minister: Ion Ciubuc; Ion Sturza; Dumitru Braghiș
- Preceded by: Nicolae Dudău
- Succeeded by: Efim Chilari

Judge of the Constitutional Court
- In office 22 February 1995 – 27 February 1998

First Deputy Minister of Foreign Affairs
- In office 23 March 1994 – 22 February 1995
- President: Mircea Snegur
- Prime Minister: Andrei Sangheli
- Minister: Mihai Popov

Deputy Minister of Foreign Affairs
- In office 6 August 1990 – 30 June 1992
- President: Mircea Snegur
- Prime Minister: Mircea Druc; Valeriu Muravschi
- Minister: Nicolae Țâu

Personal details
- Born: November 12, 1944 (age 81) Bozovici, Caraș-Severin, Kingdom of Romania
- Education: Moldova State University and "M. V. Lomonosov" Moscow State University
- Profession: Legal scholar, professor

Nicolae Osmochescu (born 12 November 1944) is a legal scholar of the Republic of Moldova, professor of international law at Moldova State University, former Constitutional Court judge and politician.

== Early life and education ==
Nicolae Osmochescu was born on November 12, 1944, in Şumița, Bozovici commune, in the Romanian part of the historical Banat region.

Between 1968 and 1973, he studied at the Moldova State University's Department of International Law and Law of Foreign Economic Relations. In the years 1974–1977 he was a doctoral student at the "M. V. Lomonosov" Moscow State University's Faculty of Law, graduating as Dr. jur. in international law.

== Career ==
=== Soviet period ===
From 1973 to 1990 he rose through the academic and administrative ranks from university lecturer to head of department at the State University of Moldova's Faculty of Law.

=== Independent Moldova ===
Osmochescu was head of the working group which drafted the Constitution of the Republic of Moldova.

He obtained a PhD in Law while serving as the First Deputy Foreign Minister of Moldova in two cabinets - the First and Second Ciubuc Cabinets. He was Prime-Deputy Minister for the Exterior in 1990–1992 and 1994–1995. In 1993–1994 he worked as counselor to the President of Moldova, a position held at the time by Mircea Snegur. On 22 February 1995, Osmochescu was designated judge of the Constitutional Court, a position he resigned on 25 September 1998.

In the early 21st century, Osmochescu served as Moldova's Ambassador in Tashkent, Bishkek and Dushanbe.

== Publications ==
Osmochescu authored the monographs "International Law in the Constitutions of modern states", "Referendum – as a way of direct expression of the people's will", and "Protocol and diplomatic etiquette".

== Awards ==
- Diplomatic Merit First Class ("Meritul Diplomatic" Clasa Întâi), 17 January 2020. Awarded by the Minister of Foreign Affairs and European Integration.
