= Ion Stăvilă =

Moldovan diplomat (born 1958)

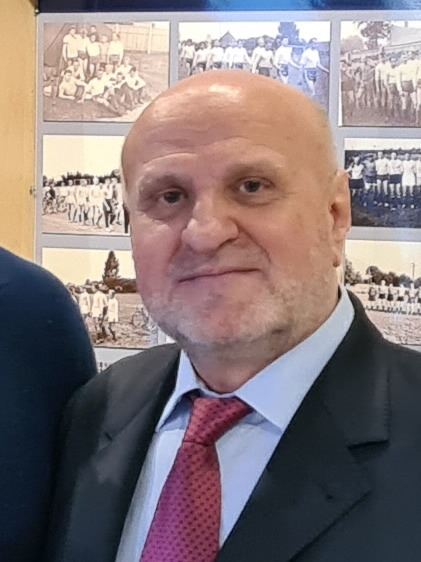
- Stăvilă in 2023

Moldovan Ambassador to Estonia
- In office 3 July 2020 – 30 July 2024
- President: Igor Dodon; Maia Sandu
- Prime Minister: Ion Chicu; Aureliu Ciocoi (acting); Natalia Gavrilița; Dorin Recean
- Preceded by: Inga Ionesii
- Succeeded by: Eugen Caras

Moldovan Ambassador to Ukraine, Turkmenistan and Uzbekistan
- In office 21 June 2010 – 16 June 2015
- President: Mihai Ghimpu (acting); Vladimir Filat (acting); Marian Lupu (acting); Nicolae Timofti
- Prime Minister: Vladimir Filat; Iurie Leancă; Chiril Gaburici
- Preceded by: Nicolae Gumenîi
- Succeeded by: Ruslan Bolbocean

Deputy Minister of Reintegration
- In office 1 November 2006 – 24 December 2009
- President: Vladimir Voronin; Mihai Ghimpu (acting)
- Prime Minister: Vasile Tarlev; Zinaida Greceanîi; Vitalie Pîrlog (acting); Vladimir Filat
- Minister: Vasilii Șova

Deputy Minister of Foreign Affairs
- In office 8 November 2001 – 11 February 2004
- President: Vladimir Voronin
- Prime Minister: Vasile Tarlev
- Minister: Nicolae Dudău; Andrei Stratan

Personal details
- Born: 9 October 1958 (age 67) Jora de Jos, Moldavian SSR, Soviet Union
- Profession: Diplomat

Ion Stăvilă (born 9 October 1958) is a Moldovan diplomat. He served as the Moldovan Ambassador to Ukraine.
