= Voloka, Chernivtsi Raion, Chernivtsi Oblast =

Village in Chernivtsi Oblast, Ukraine

Voloka Волока
- Village
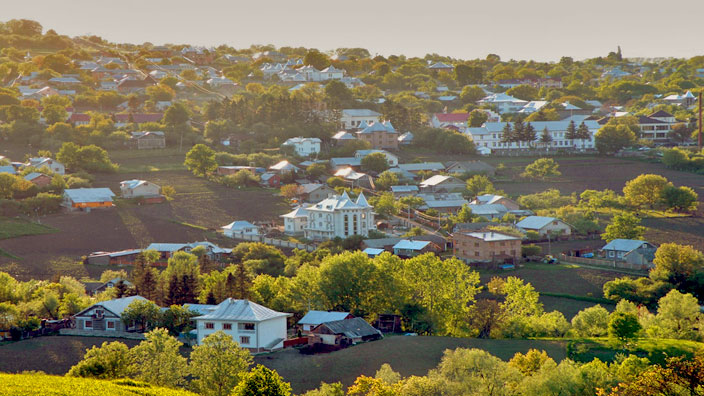

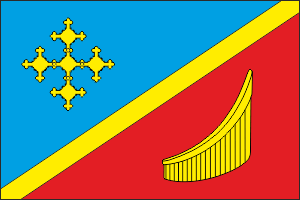
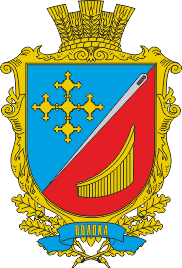
- Flag Coat of arms
- Interactive map of Voloka
- Location within Chernivtsi Oblast Location within Ukraine
- Coordinates: 48°11′41″N 25°56′34″E
- Country: Ukraine
- Oblast: Chernivtsi Oblast
- Raion: Chernivtsi Raion
- Hromada: Voloka rural hromada
- Elevation: 193 m (633 ft)

Population
  - Total: 3,035
- Postal code: 60413

Voloka (Ukrainian: Волока; Romanian: Voloca pe Derelui or Romanian: Voloca; German: Woloka am Derelui) is a village in Chernivtsi Raion, Chernivtsi Oblast, Ukraine. It hosts the administration of Voloka rural hromada, one of the hromadas of Ukraine.

The current population of the village is 3,035 (3,028 at the time of the 2001 Ukrainian census).

Most inhabitants are Romanians and they are almost exclusively engaged in the creation of bridal gowns, a business that has proved quite successful in the past decade, as the village has managed to make a name for itself in almost all of Ukraine and Russia as well as Romania.

Until 18 July 2020, Voloka belonged to Hlyboka Raion. The raion was abolished in July 2020 as part of the administrative reform of Ukraine, which reduced the number of raions of Chernivtsi Oblast to three. The area of Hlyboka Raion was merged into Chernivtsi Raion. In 2001, 97.56% of the inhabitants of Voloka spoke Romanian as their native language (2,960 called it Romanian, or 97.53%, and 1 called it "Moldovan", or 0.03%), while 2.08% spoke Ukrainian. In the 1989 census, the number of residents who declared themselves Romanian plus Moldovan was 2,907 (1,060 Romanians, or 33.68%, plus 1,847 Moldovans, or 58.69%), representing 92.37% of the locality's population of 3,147. A large majority of the population switched their declared census identities from Moldovan and Moldovan-speaking to Romanian and Romanian-speaking between the 1989 and 2001 censuses.

In 2001, the Volokivska or Voloka rural community had 6,086 inhabitants, including 4,919 Romanian-speakers (80.82%, including 4,749 self-identified Romanian-speakers, or 78.03% and 170 self-identified 170 "Moldovan-speakers", or 2.79%), 1,090 Ukrainian-speakers (17.91%), and 55 Russian-speakers (0.9%). In addition to the villages of Voloka and Valia Kuzmyna, it also included the village of Hrushivka village (see the Romanian-language Wikipedia article on Hrushivka at https://ro.wikipedia.org/wiki/Gru%C8%99%C4%83u%C8%9Bi,_Ad%C3%A2ncata). According to the 2001 Ukrainian census, the majority of the population of 1,187 people of Hrushivka was Romanian-speaking (97.98% or 1,163 people, including 1,144 self-identified Romanian-speakers, or 96.38%, and 19 self-identified "Moldovan-speakers", or 1.6%), with a minority of Ukrainian speakers (1.43%, or 17 people) and of Russian-speakers (0.51%, or 6 people). In the 1989 census, the number of residents who declared themselves Romanian plus Moldovan was 1,089, or 96.71% (495 Romanians, or 43.96%, plus 594 Moldovans, or 52.75%), but there were also 17 Ukrainians (1.51%) and 6 Russians (0.53%). A majority of the population switched their declared census identities from Moldovan and Moldovan-speaking to Romanian and Romanian-speaking between the 1989 and 2001 censuses.

In 2001, out of 6,086 individuals who lived in the Voloka rural hromada, 1,090 were Ukrainian-speaking (17.91%), 4,929 were Romanian-speaking (80.99%), including 4,759 who called the language Romanian (78.2%) and 170 who called it Moldovan (2.79%), and 40 were Russian-speaking (0.66%). In 1989, out 5,928 inhabitants, 821 (13.85%) were ethnic Ukrainians, 1,693 were ethnic Romanians (28.56%), 3,348 were ethnic Moldovans (56.48%) and 44 were Russians (0.74%). A majority of the Romanian plus Moldovan population switched their declared census identities from Moldovan and Moldovan-speaking to Romanian and Romanian-speaking between the 1989 and 2001 censuses. The reason why the "Moldovan" identity was dominant during the Soviet period, but was replaced by the "Romanian" one after 1989, including in Voloka and the Voloka rural hromada, was that the inhabitants of the Chernivtsi and Sadagura rural raions, and of the Bukovinian part of the Novoselytsia rural raion, were pressured in 1944 to adopt a "Moldovan" national/ethnic identity.

== Notable people ==
- Paun Rohovei (born 1970), Ukrainian diplomat
