= Embassy of Ukraine, Chișinău =

Ukrainian mission in Moldova

Ukrainian Embassy, Chișinău
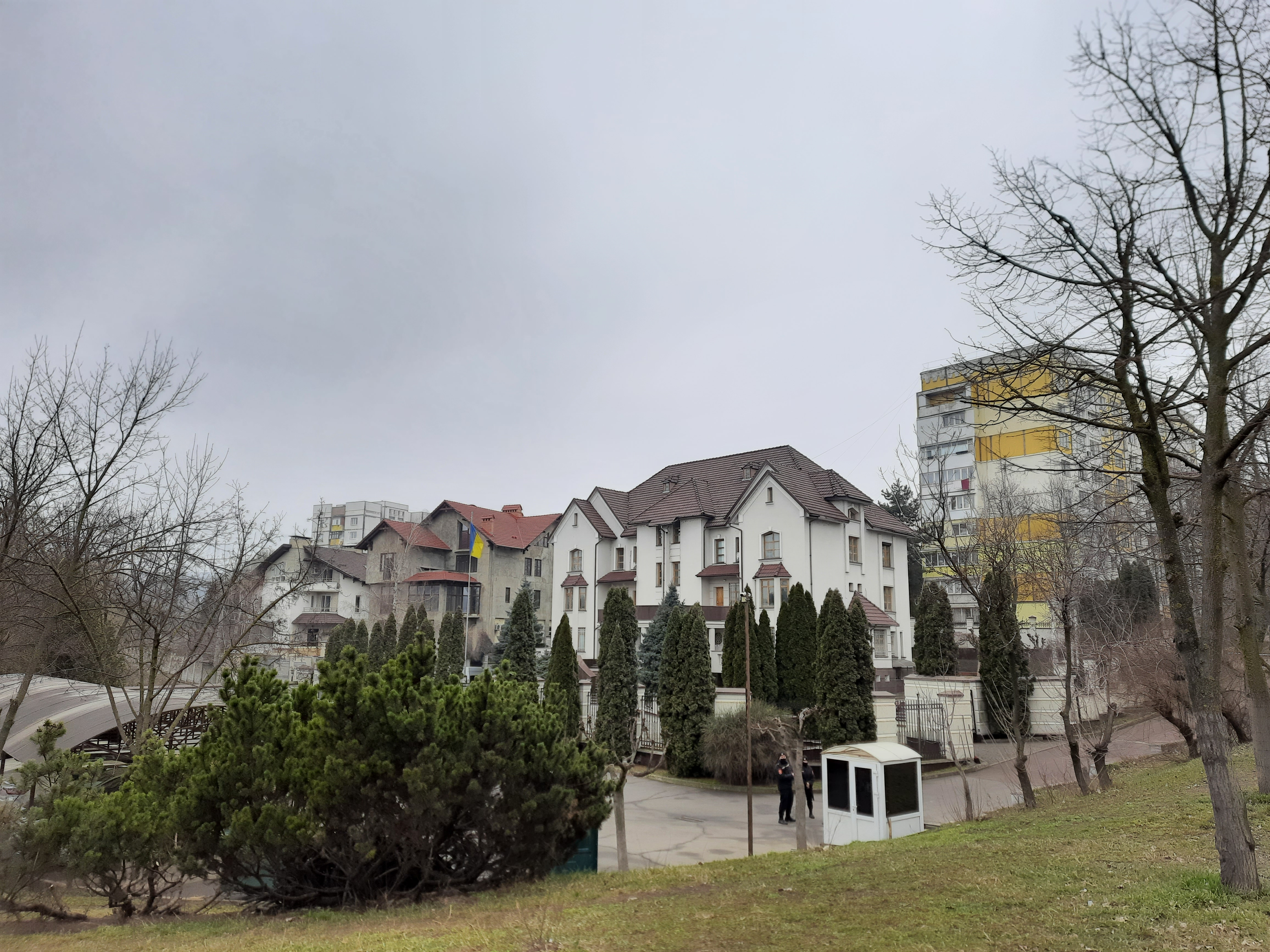
- Location: Chișinău
- Address: Vasile Lupu 17 in Chișinău
- Ambassador: Paun Rohovei
- Website: https://moldova.mfa.gov.ua/

The Ukrainian Embassy in Chișinău is the diplomatic mission of Ukraine in the Republic of Moldova. The embassy building is located at Vasile Lupu 17 in Chișinău. Ukrainian Ambassador to the Republic of Moldova has been Paun Rohovei since 2025.

== History ==
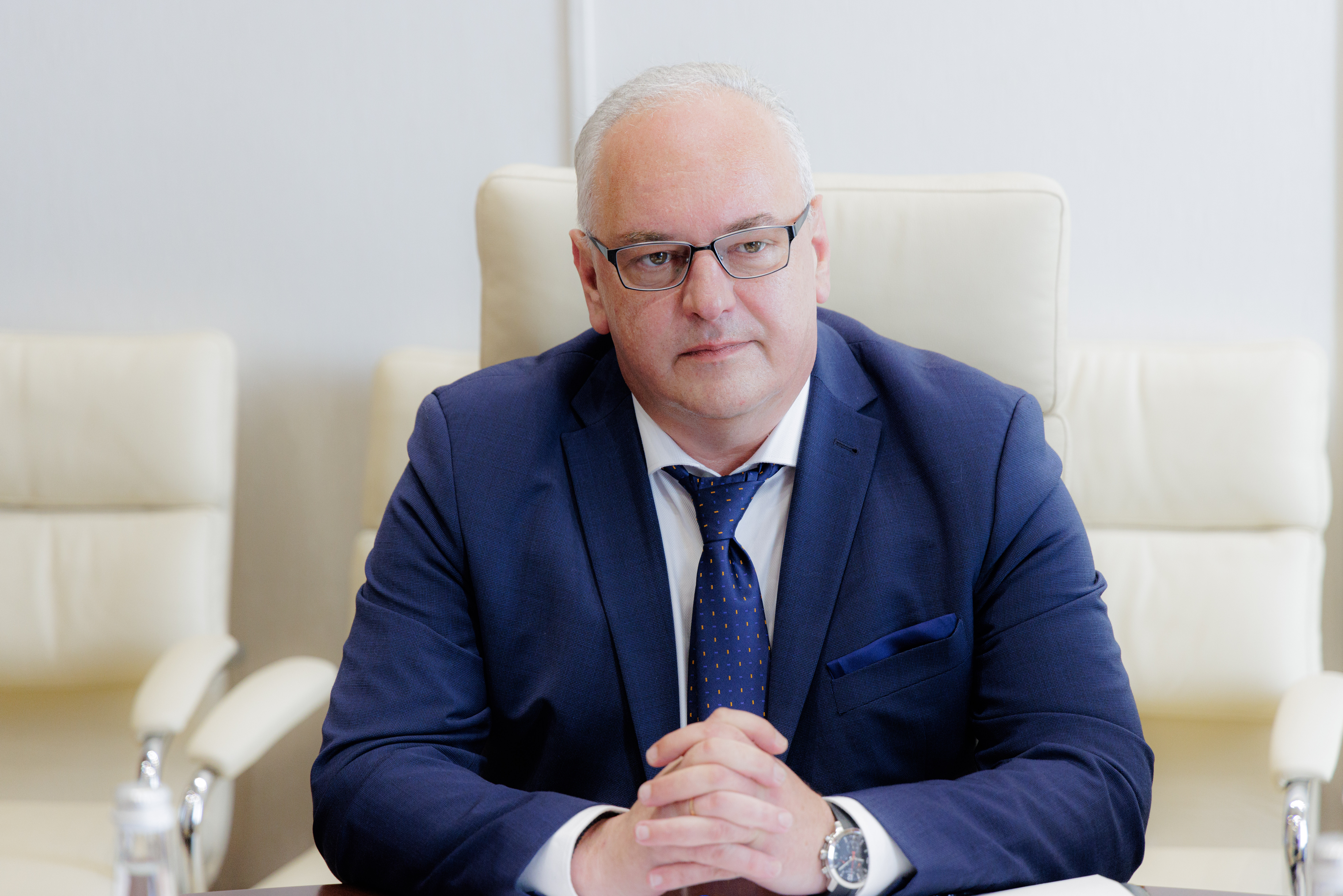
Paun Rohovei, Ambassador since 2025

After the collapse of the Soviet Union, Ukraine declared itself independent in August 1991. On December 21, 1991, Ukraine recognized the independence of the Republic of Moldova. Diplomatic relations were established on March 10, 1992. The embassy in Chișinău was opened in 1993. The first ambassador was Boyko Vitaly. Marko Shevchenko was accredited as Ukrainian ambassador to the Republic of Moldova in February 2020. On 7 February 2025, Paun Rohovei was appointed ambassador.

The length of the inland border between the two countries is 1,222 kilometres (759 mi), of which 267 kilometres (166 mi), is fluvial (i.e., along rivers) and 955 kilometres (593 mi), is land border. About 454 kilometres (282 mi), of it constitutes the de facto border between Ukraine and the unrecognized breakaway republic of Transnistria.

In the cultural and humanitarian field, there are regular projects between neighbouring countries, including Transnistria. The Culture and Information Center (CIC) has been set up in the embassy since April 2007. Television and radio broadcast a weekly program in Ukrainian. In terms of association law, the Republic of Moldova has a Ukrainian Community and a Society for Ukrainian Culture.

== Tasks of the Embassy ==
The main task of the Embassy of Ukraine in Chișinău is to represent the interests of Ukraine, to promote the development of political, economic, cultural, scientific, and other ties, as well as to protect the rights and interests of citizens and legal entities of Ukraine located in Moldova.

The embassy promotes the development of interstate relations between Ukraine and Moldova at all levels, to ensure the harmonious development of mutual relations, as well as cooperation on issues of mutual interest. The embassy also performs consular functions.

== History of diplomatic relations ==
Ukraine recognized the independence of the Republic of Moldova on December 21, 1991. Diplomatic relations between the Republic of Moldova and Ukraine were established on March 10, 1992.

== Heads of diplomatic mission ==
1. Vitaliy Boiko (1993–1994), Ambassador
2. Eugene Viktorovich Levitsky (1994–1996), chargé d'affaires.
3. Ivan Mykolayovych Hnatyshyn (1996–2000)
4. Teofil Georgievich Rendyuk (2000), chargé d'affaires
5. Peter Fedorovich Chaly (2000–2007)
6. Sergey Ivanovich Pirozhkov (2007–2014)
7. Gennady Valentinovich Altukhov (2014–2015), chargé d'affaires
8. Ivan Mykolayovych Hnatyshyn (2015–2019), second rotation
9. Marko Oleksandrovych Shevchenko (2019–2024)
10. Paun Aurelovici Rohovei (2025–)

== See also ==
- Moldova–Ukraine relations
- List of diplomatic missions of Ukraine
- List of diplomatic missions in Moldova
- Embassy of Moldova, Kyiv
