= Iurie Reniță =

Moldovan politician and diplomat (born 1958)

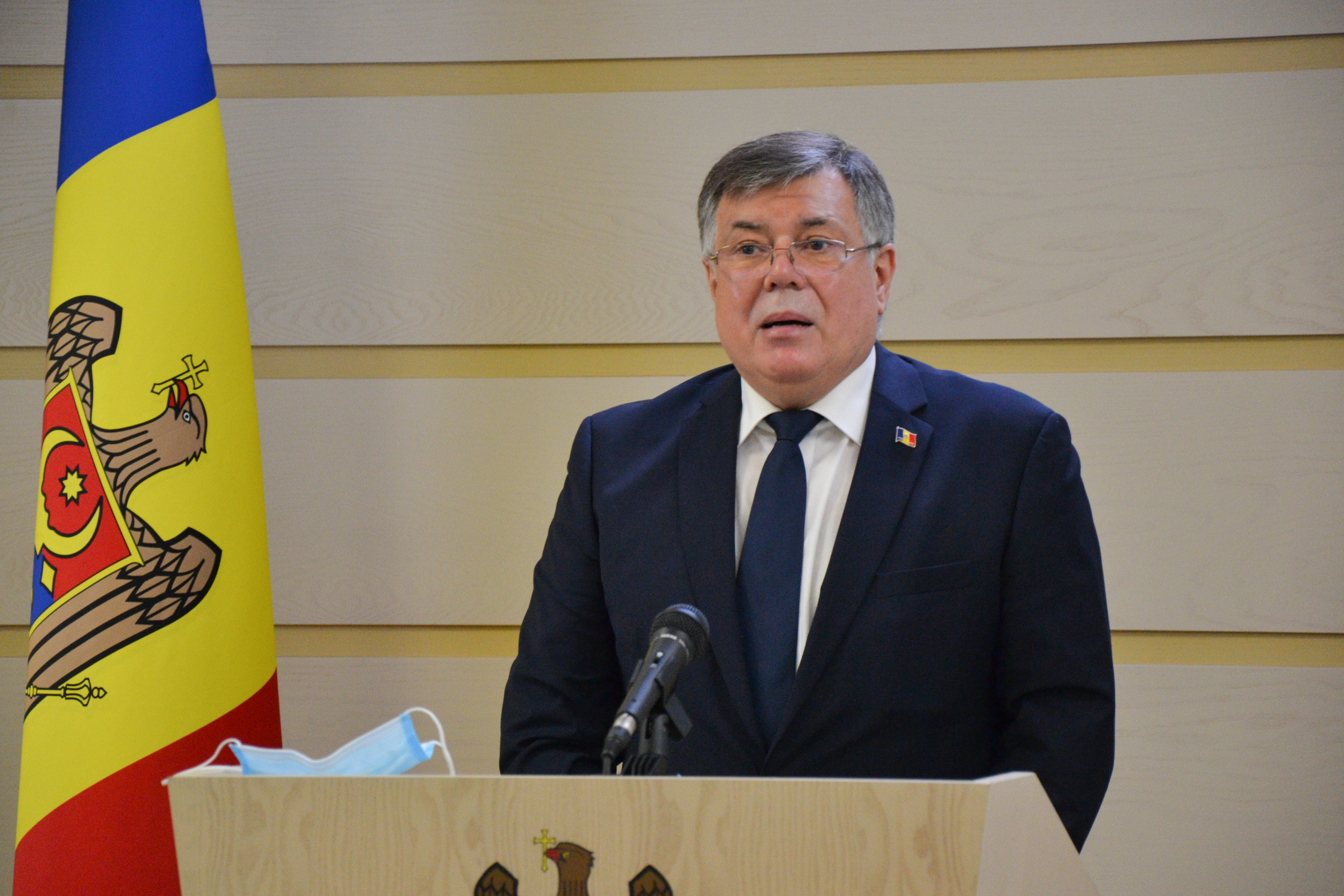
- Reniță in 2020

Member of the Moldovan Parliament
- In office 9 March 2019 – 23 July 2021
- Parliamentary group: Dignity and Truth Platform
- Constituency: Chișinău
- Majority: 10,082 (37.3%)

Moldovan Ambassador to Belgium and Luxembourg
- In office 3 February 2016 – 14 November 2017
- President: Nicolae Timofti; Igor Dodon
- Prime Minister: Pavel Filip
- Preceded by: Mihai Gribincea
- Succeeded by: Lilian Darii

Moldovan Ambassador to Romania, Montenegro and Serbia
- In office 21 June 2010 – 16 June 2015
- President: Mihai Ghimpu (acting); Vlad Filat (acting); Marian Lupu (acting); Nicolae Timofti
- Prime Minister: Vlad Filat; Iurie Leancă; Chiril Gaburici
- Preceded by: Lidia Guțu
- Succeeded by: Mihai Gribincea

Personal details
- Born: 5 April 1958 (age 68) Abaclia, Moldavian SSR, Soviet Union
- Citizenship: Moldova; Romania
- Education: National University of Political Studies and Public Administration; Moldova State University
- Profession: Diplomat, Journalist

Iurie Reniță (born 5 April 1958) is a Moldovan politician and diplomat serving as member of Parliament of Moldova since 2019. He was the Moldovan Ambassador to Romania from 2010 to 2015 and Ambassador to Belgium and Luxembourg from 2016 to 2017.

== Biography ==
Iurie Reniță was born to Lidia and Dumitru Reniță on 5 April 1958 in Abaclia. He was part of the first graduating class of the Moldovan students at the Bucharest-based National School of Administration and Political Sciences. During 1996-1999 he was counselor at the Moldovan Embassy, Washington, D.C., after which he served as advisor to Foreign Minister Nicolae Tăbăcaru. Iurie Reniță also worked for several years with the Organization for Security and Co-operation in Europe Mission to Croatia and was manager of the British American Tobacco, Moldova.

On June 21, 2010, Mihai Ghimpu signed a decree appointing Iurie Reniță the new ambassador of Moldova in Romania. He was elected member of Parliament of Moldova in the 2019 parliamentary election running as independent within the ACUM Electoral Bloc.

== See also ==
- Moldovan Embassy, Bucharest
- Embassy of Romania in Chişinău
- Moldovan–Romanian relations
