= Aurelian Dănilă =

Moldovan diplomat (born 1948)

1st Moldovan Ambassador to Germany, Denmark and Sweden
- In office 30 July 1997 – 14 February 2001
- President: Petru Lucinschi
- Prime Minister: Ion Ciubuc; Ion Sturza; Dumitru Braghiș
- Succeeded by: Nicolae Tăbăcaru

First Deputy Minister of Foreign Affairs
- In office 27 March 1995 – 30 July 1997
- President: Mircea Snegur; Petru Lucinschi
- Prime Minister: Andrei Sangheli; Ion Ciubuc
- Minister: Mihai Popov; Nicolae Tăbăcaru

1st Moldovan Ambassador to Romania
- In office 20 January 1992 – 17 June 1994
- President: Mircea Snegur
- Prime Minister: Valeriu Muravschi; Andrei Sangheli
- Succeeded by: Grigore Eremei

Personal details
- Born: 19 January 1948 (age 78) Frumoasa, Moldavian SSR, Soviet Union

Aurelian Dănilă (born 19 January 1948) is a Moldovan diplomat. He served as the 1st Moldovan Ambassador to Romania.
