= Tîrnova, Edineț =

Tîrnova
- Village
- Location in Moldova
- Coordinates: 48°12′N 27°10′E
- Country: Moldova
- District: Edineț District

Area
  - Total: 9.47 sq mi (24.52 km^{2})
- Elevation: 620 ft (189 m)

Population (2014 census)
  - Total: 1,963
  - Density: 207.3/sq mi (80.06/km^{2})
- Time zone: UTC+2 (EET)
  - Summer (DST): UTC+3 (EEST)
- Postal code: MD-4643
- Area code: +373 246

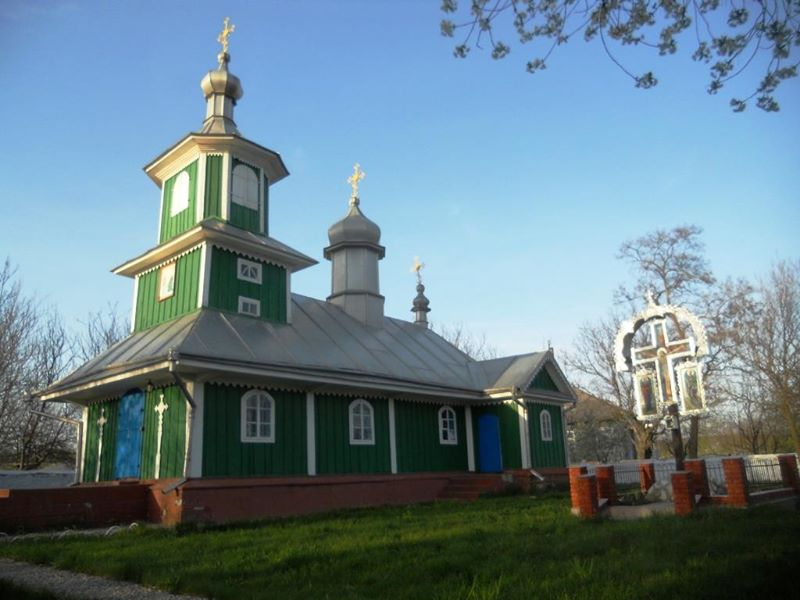
The Holy Trinity Wooden Church in Tîrnova village, Edineț, 2012

Tîrnova is a village in Edineț District, Moldova.

== Notable people ==
- Grigore Eremei
