= Grigore Eremei =

Moldovan politician (1935–2024)

Member of the Moldovan Parliament
- In office 9 April 1998 – 22 March 2001
- Parliamentary group: Democratic and Prosperous Moldova Electoral Bloc

Moldovan Ambassador to Romania, Greece and Cyprus
- In office 1 June 1994 – 25 May 1998
- President: Mircea Snegur; Petru Lucinschi
- Prime Minister: Andrei Sangheli; Ion Ciubuc
- Preceded by: Aurelian Dănilă
- Succeeded by: Emil Ciobu

1st Moldovan Ambassador to Belarus
- In office 15 September 1993 – 1 June 1994
- President: Mircea Snegur
- Prime Minister: Andrei Sangheli
- Succeeded by: Ion Leșanu

First Secretary of the Communist Party of Moldavia
- In office 5 February 1991 – 23 August 1991
- President: Mircea Snegur
- Prime Minister: Mircea Druc
- Preceded by: Petru Lucinschi

Personal details
- Born: 22 April 1935 Tîrnova, Kingdom of Romania
- Died: 29 December 2024 (aged 89) Chișinău, Moldova
- Party: Communist Party of Moldova

Grigore Eremei (22 April 1935 – 29 December 2024) was a Soviet and Moldovan politician.

== Biography ==
Grigore Eremei was born in Tîrnova, Edineț. In 1956, he served in the Soviet Army.

From 5 February until 23 August 1991 he was the final First Secretary of the Communist Party of Moldova, the republic level branch of the Communist Party of the Soviet Union. The Communist Party was outlawed by the government in August 1991, just before the Moldovan Declaration of Independence. In 1994, he was appointed Ambassador to Romania.

For his work, he was awarded the Order of Honour in 2005.

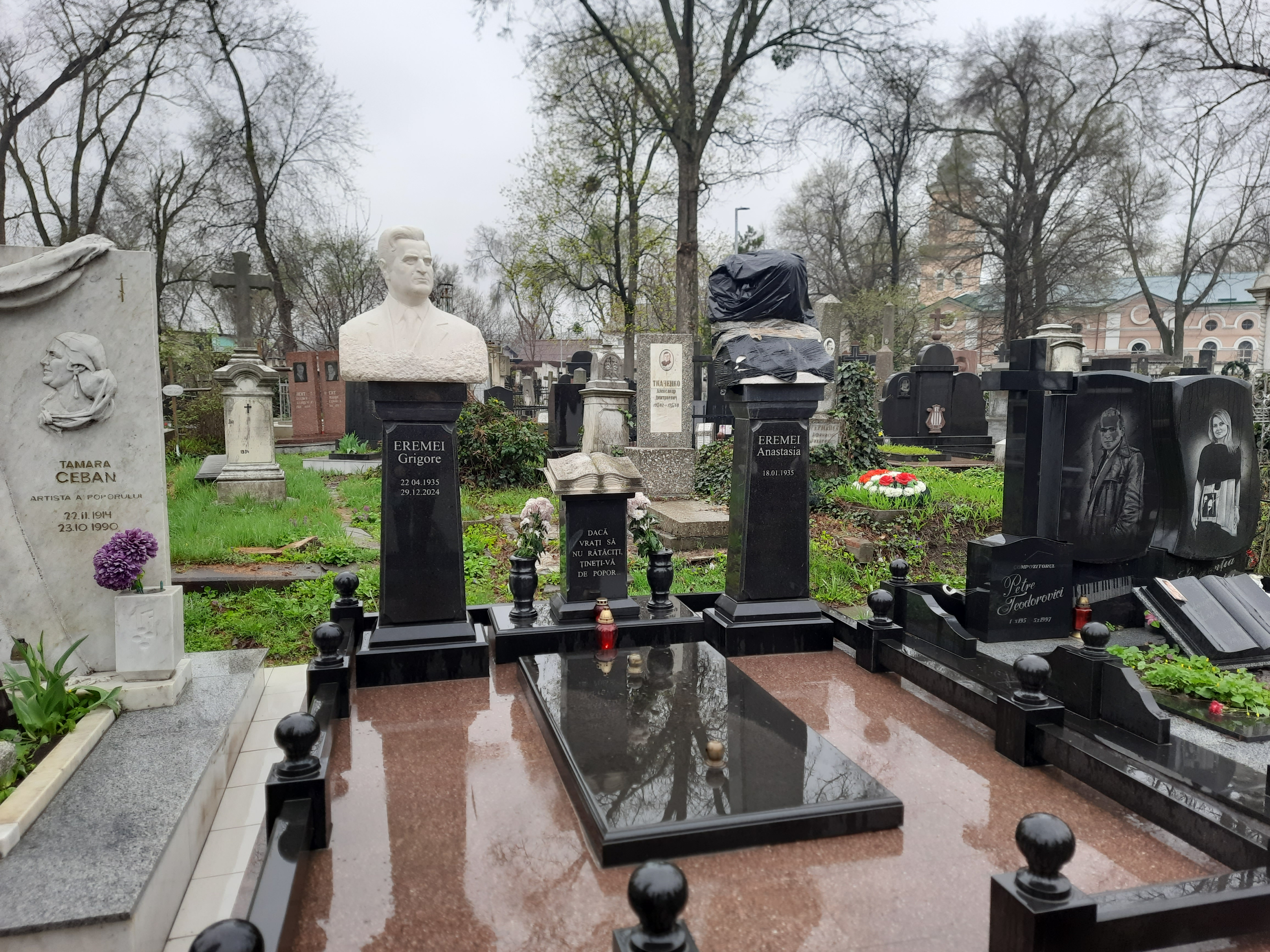
Grave Grigore Eremei

== Works ==
- Faţa nevăzută a puterii (Ed. Litera, Chişinău, 2003).

Party political offices
Preceded by Petru Lucinschi	First Secretary of the Moldavian Communist Party; 30 December 1981 – 16 November 1989	Succeeded by Party outlawed
