= Chahor =

Commune in Chernivtsi Oblast, Ukraine

Coordinates: 48.2411°N 25.9869°E

Chahor (Ukrainian: Чагор; Romanian: Ceahor; German: Czahor) is a village in Chernivtsi Raion, Chernivtsi Oblast, Ukraine. It hosts the administration of Chahor rural hromada, one of the hromadas of Ukraine.

Until 18 July 2020, Chahor belonged to Hlyboka Raion. The raion was abolished in July 2020 as part of the administrative reform of Ukraine, which reduced the number of raions of Chernivtsi Oblast to three. The area of Hlyboka Raion was merged into Chernivtsi Raion. According to the 2001 Ukrainian census, Chahor had a population of 4,264 inhabitants, out of which 3,776 (88.56%) were Ukrainian-speakers, 433 (10.15%) Romanian-speakers (including 238 self-identified Moldovan-speakers or 5.59%, and 195 self-identified Romanians-speakers, or 4.57%) and 48 Russian-speakers (1.13%). The village was one of the localities where during the Soviet period before 1989, more people were listed as ethnic Moldovans than as ethnic Romanians. In 1989, a majority of the 3,840 inhabitants of the village were Ukrainians, but 1,095 were Romanians (28.52%) and 221 (5.76%) were Moldovans. The village was rather unique in that there was a significant number of self-identified ethnic Romanians who called their language Moldovan in 2001, which largely explains why in the raion there were 333 ethnic Romanians who called their language Moldovan. In the locality, a suburb of the city of Chernivtsi, a large number of rich ethnic Ukrainians have settled, and this partly explains the increase in the proportion of ethnic Ukrainians and Ukrainian-speakers, but so does Ukrainization in a village without a Romanian-language school, which also largely explains why many self-identified local ethnic Romanians called their language Moldovan in 2001.
