= Bozovici =

- Commune
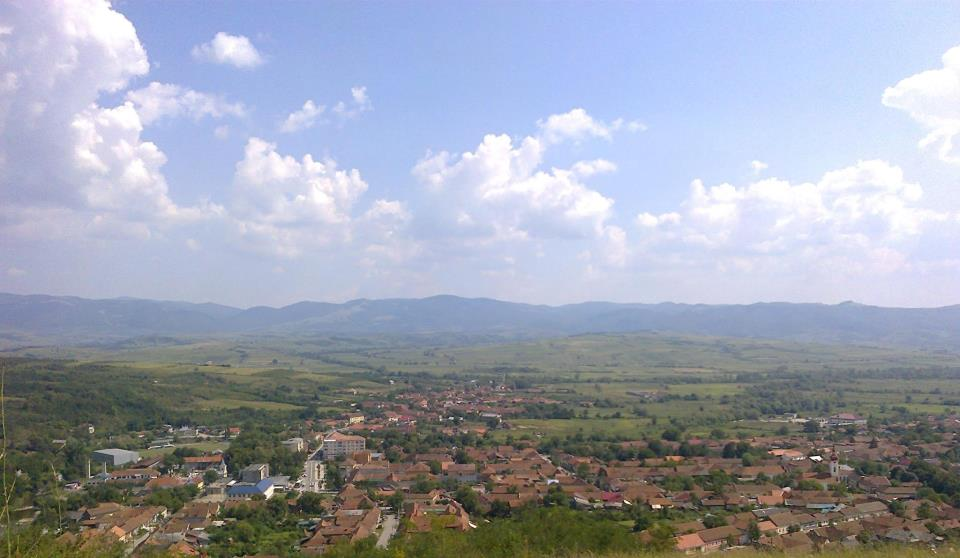
- View of Bozovici

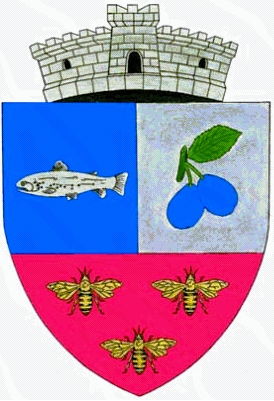
- Coat of arms

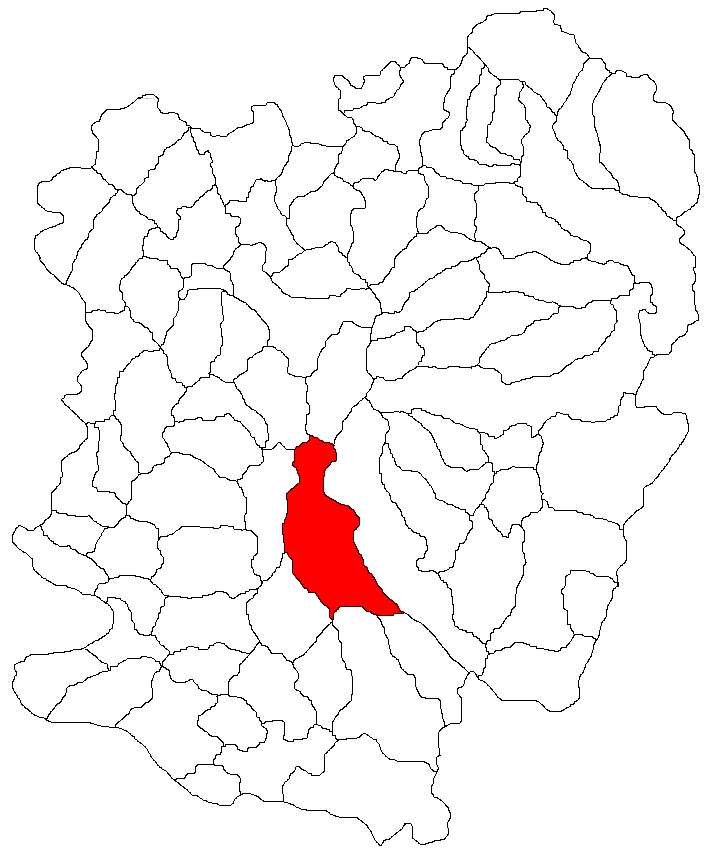
- Location in Caraș-Severin County

- Location in Romania
- Coordinates: 44°56′N 22°0′E
- Country: Romania
- County: Caraș-Severin

Government
  - Mayor (2024–2028): Adrian-Sergiu Stoicu (PSD)
- Area: 187.77 km^{2} (72.50 sq mi)
- Elevation: 252 m (827 ft)
- Population (2021-12-01): 2,506
  - Density: 13.35/km^{2} (34.57/sq mi)
- Time zone: UTC+02:00 (EET)
  - Summer (DST): UTC+03:00 (EEST)
- Postal code: 327040
- Area code: +(40) x55
- Vehicle reg.: CS
- Website: primariabozovici.ro

Bozovici (Hungarian: Bozovics; German: Bosowitsch; Czech: Božoviče) is a commune in Caraș-Severin County, western Romania. It is composed of four villages: Bozovici, Poneasca (Ponyászkatelep), Prilipeț (Prilipec), and Valea Minișului (Ménesvölgy).

The commune is located in the south-central part of the county, 33 km (21 mi) southeast of the town of Anina, and 72 km (45 mi) from the county seat, Reșița. It lies on the banks of the river Nera; the river Miniș discharges into the Nera in Valea Minișului village.

Izvorul Bigăr (or, the Bigăr Waterfall) is a protected area situated on the administrative territory of Bozovici, in the Nera Gorge-Beușnița National Park.

Also located on the territory of the commune is the Bozovici coal mine. This is an underground mining exploitation, one of the largest of its kind in Romania.

Historical population
Year	Pop.	±%
1880	5,194	—
1890	5,382	+3.6%
1910	5,989	+11.3%
1930	5,193	−13.3%
1941	4,914	−5.4%
1977	4,049	−17.6%
1992	3,666	−9.5%
2002	3,321	−9.4%
2011	2,924	−12.0%
2021	2,506	−14.3%
Source: Census data

At the 2021 census, Bozovici had a population of 2,506; of those, 86.31% were Romanians and 5.47% Roma.

== Natives ==
- Gideon von Krismanic (1817-1876), major general in the Austrian army born in Bozovici
- Nicolae Osmochescu, born in 1944 in Șumița, Bozovici; legal scholar, former judge and politician in the Republic of Moldova
- Sebastian Velcotă (born 1998), professional footballer
