= Lidia Guțu =

Moldovan politician (born 1954)

Moldovan Ambassador to Bulgaria
- In office 16 June 2009 – 21 November 2009
- President: Vladimir Voronin; Mihai Ghimpu (acting)
- Prime Minister: Zinaida Greceanîi; Vitalie Pîrlog (acting); Vladimir Filat
- Preceded by: Veaceslav Madan

Moldovan Ambassador to Romania, Montenegro and Serbia
- In office 10 March 2006 – 21 April 2009
- President: Vladimir Voronin
- Prime Minister: Vasile Tarlev; Zinaida Greceanîi
- Preceded by: Victor Zlacevschi
- Succeeded by: Iurie Reniță

Deputy Prime Minister of Moldova
- In office 21 December 1999 – 19 April 2001 Serving with Valeriu Cosarciuc
- President: Petru Lucinschi; Vladimir Voronin
- Prime Minister: Dumitru Braghiș
- Preceded by: Oleg Stratulat
- Succeeded by: Valerian Cristea

Personal details
- Born: 10 August 1954 (age 71) Verejeni, Moldavian SSR, Soviet Union
- Party: Party Alliance Our Moldova
- Other political affiliations: Electoral Bloc Democratic Moldova

Lidia Guțu (born 10 August 1954) is a Moldovan politician.

== Biography ==
She served as member of the Parliament of Moldova (2005–2006) and ambassador to Romania (2006–2009).
