= Tarashany =

Village in Chernivtsi Oblast, Ukraine

Coordinates: 48°07′N 26°01′E

Tarashany (Ukrainian: Тарашани; Romanian: Tărășeni or Tătărășeni; German: Terescheni or Terescheny or Tereszeny) is a village in Chernivtsi Raion, Chernivtsi Oblast, Ukraine. It hosts the administration of Tarashany rural hromada, one of the hromadas of Ukraine.

Until 18 July 2020, Tarashany belonged to Hlyboka Raion. The raion was abolished in July 2020 as part of the administrative reform of Ukraine, which reduced the number of raions of Chernivtsi Oblast to three. The area of Hlyboka Raion was merged into Chernivtsi Raion.

According to the 2001 census, the majority of the population of Tarășeni was Ukrainian-speaking (91.89%, or 907 people), with Romanian (6.99%, or 69 people, including 3.65% who called the language Romanian, or 36 people, or and 3.34% who called it "Moldovan", or 33 people) and Russian (1.11%, or 11 people) speakers in the minority. In 1989, out of 914 inhabitants, 58 (6.35%) were Moldovans, 66 (7.22%) were Romanians, and a large majority were Ukrainians.

According to the 2001 census, the majority of the population of Privoroky (see the link to the Romanian language article on the village at https://ro.wikipedia.org/wiki/Prevoroche,_Ad%C3%A2ncata), a village in the commune with 1,284 inhabitants, was Romanian-speaking (90.19%, or 1,158 people, including 78.27% who called the language "Moldovan", or 1,005 people, and 11.92% who called it Romanian, or 153 people), with the rest speaking Ukrainian (8.49%, or 109 people) and Russian (1.32%, or 17 people). In 1989, out of 1,054 inhabitants, 945 (89.66%) were Moldovans, and 46 were Romanians (4.36%) were Romanians, 52 (4.93%) were Ukrainians, and 10 (0.09%) were Russians. While there was some switch from a Moldovan ethnic and linguistic identity to a Romanian one, the locality is not listed among those villages where there was a massive switch in that direction.

== Natives ==
- Ioan Volcinschi (1846–1910), ethnic Romanian physician and politician in the Duchy of Bukovina
