= Paun Rohovei =

Ukrainian diplomat

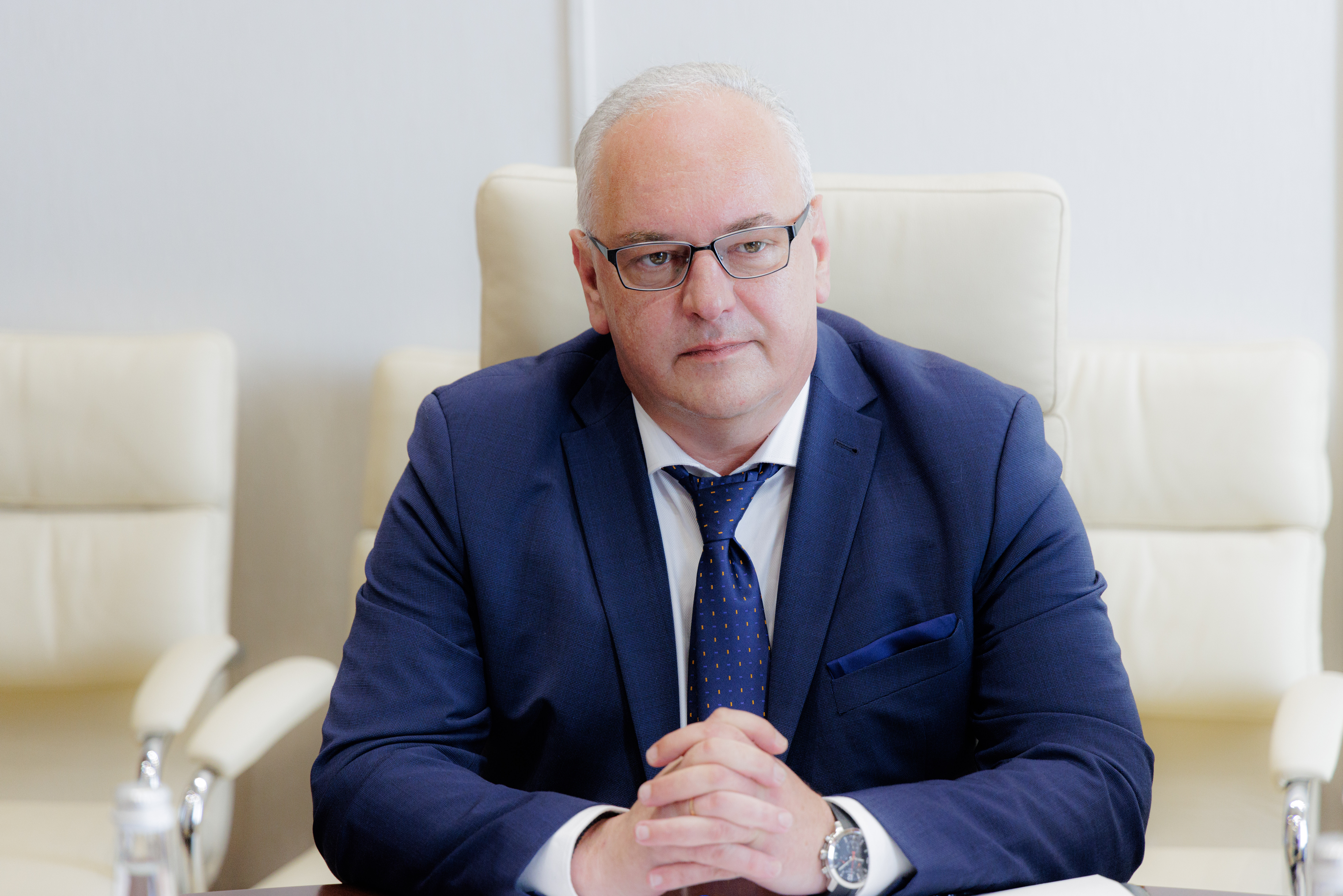
- Rohovei in 2024

Ambassador of Ukraine to Moldova
- Incumbent
- Assumed office 7 February 2025
- Preceded by: Marko Shevchenko

Special Representative of Ukraine for the Transnistrian Settlement
- In office May 2023 – 7 February 2025
- Preceded by: Yuriy Klymenko
- Succeeded by: Marko Shevchenko

Chargé d'affaires ad interim of Ukraine to Romania
- In office 26 July 2020 – July 2022
- Preceded by: Oleksandr Bankov
- Succeeded by: Ihor Prokopchuk

Personal details
- Born: 26 October 1970 (age 55) Voloka, Ukrainian SSR, Soviet Union (now Ukraine)
- Education: University of Chernivtsi
- Occupation: Diplomat
- Awards: Order of Merit in the "3rd class" rank (2022)

Paun Rohovei (born 26 October 1970; Romanian: Paun Aurelovici Rohovei, also Păun; Ukrainian: Паун Аурелович Роговей) is a Ukrainian diplomat. He is the Ambassador of Ukraine to Moldova since 7 February 2025. He previously held numerous posts over many years at the Ukrainian embassies in Bucharest and Chișinău, and was also Ukraine's ambassador with special missions for the Transnistria conflict. Rohovei is an ethnic Romanian.

== Biography ==
Paun Rohovei was born on 26 October 1970, in the ethnic Romanian village of Voloka (Romanian: Voloca pe Derelui or Voloca) in Chernivtsi Oblast, Ukraine (then in the Ukrainian SSR of the Soviet Union). Rohovei himself is an ethnic Romanian and speaks Romanian fluently. He graduated from the Faculty of History of the Chernivtsi University in 1993. As of 2025, he was married and had a daughter.

Rohovei started working for the Ministry of Foreign Affairs of Ukraine in 1997. He worked as second and later first secretary at the Embassy of Ukraine in Bucharest from 2000 to 2004 and as first secretary and counsellor at the same embassy from 2006 to 2010. He was on a long-term foreign mission as counsellor at the Embassy of Ukraine in Chișinău from 2012 to 2017. Rohovei was transferred back to the embassy in Bucharest on 1 December 2017, where he was chargé d'affaires ad interim from 26 July 2020 to July 2022. Rohovei was awarded Ukraine's Order of Merit in the "3rd class" rank on 28 December 2022 "for his important personal contribution to the development of interstate cooperation, fruitful diplomatic activity and high professionalism".

In May 2023, he became ambassador with special missions of Ukraine's foreign ministry for the file on the resolution of the Transnistria conflict. According to Dmytro Kuleba, then Ukraine's Minister of Foreign Affairs, Ukraine maintained contact with Transnistria (a breakaway state internationally recognised as part of Moldova), exclusively in coordination with the Moldovan government, through Rohovei. As representative of Ukraine, Rohovei met with de facto President of Transnistria Vadim Krasnoselsky and Transnistria's Minister of Foreign Affairs Vitaly Ignatiev. He also participated in Chișinău at the first forum dedicated to the resolution of the Transnistria conflict and the reintegration of Transnistria into Moldova, in which officials, diplomats and experts from Moldova, Ukraine, the United States and the European Union were present. The forum did not feature any Transnistrian representatives.

According to Moldova 1, the national Moldovan TV channel, Rohovei "is actively involved in efforts to solve the Transnistrian conflict", and he advocated for the withdrawal of Russian troops from Transnistria. In a press conference together with Moldova's Deputy Prime Minister for Reintegration Oleg Serebrian, Rohovei called the 5+2 format of negotiations for the Transnistria conflict "non-functional" due to the participation of Russia, as it would have "neither the moral nor the legal right" to participate. The Russian invasion of Ukraine was taking place at that time.

On 7 February 2025, Rohovei was appointed Ambassador of Ukraine to Moldova by the President of Ukraine, Volodymyr Zelenskyy. Rohovei succeeded Marko Shevchenko, who was removed from the post in March 2024. Zelenskyy had already announced on late March that Oleksiy Danilov, the former secretary of the National Security and Defense Council of Ukraine, would replace Shevchenko, but Rohovei's appointment indicated that this did not occur. According to the Moldovan political analyst Ion Tăbârță, the appointment of a diplomat as experienced as Rohovei in "the realities in the Republic of Moldova" and in Moldovan–Ukrainian relations showed that Ukraine wanted stability in the region. Rohovei was succeeded by Shevchenko as Ukraine's ambassador with special missions for the Transnistria conflict, as Rohovei himself stated during a May 2025 interview for the Moldovan TV network TV8.
