= Ruslan Bolbocean =

Moldovan diplomat

Moldovan Ambassador to the United Kingdom
- Incumbent
- Assumed office 13 October 2023
- President: Maia Sandu
- Prime Minister: Dorin Recean; Alexandru Munteanu; Eugen Osmochescu (acting); Vasile Tofan
- Preceded by: Angela Ponomariov

Secretary of State of the Ministry of Foreign Affairs and European Integration
- In office 13 October 2021 – 11 October 2023
- President: Maia Sandu
- Prime Minister: Natalia Gavrilița; Dorin Recean
- Minister: Nicu Popescu

Moldovan Ambassador to Ukraine, Armenia, Uzbekistan and Turkmenistan
- In office 5 November 2015 – 5 October 2021
- President: Nicolae Timofti; Igor Dodon; Maia Sandu
- Prime Minister: Gheorghe Brega (acting); Pavel Filip; Maia Sandu; Ion Chicu; Aureliu Ciocoi (acting); Natalia Gavrilița
- Preceded by: Ion Stăvilă
- Succeeded by: Valeriu Chiveri

Personal details
- Born: 20 November 1974 (age 51) Ocnița, Moldavian SSR, Soviet Union
- Education: Nicolae Testemițanu State University of Medicine and Pharmacy; Moldova State University

Ruslan Bolbocean (born 20 November 1974) is a Moldovan diplomat who currently serves as the Moldovan Ambassador to the United Kingdom.

== Biography ==
Ruslan Bolbocean's professional career began in 1999 when he joined the Ministry of Foreign Affairs of the Republic of Moldova as a Third Secretary in the Eastern Europe and Central Asia General Directorate.

From 2001 to 2004, he served as the Second Secretary at the Embassy of the Republic of Moldova to Ukraine, during which he also represented Republic Moldova at the GUAM Information Office in Kyiv (2002-2004).

Continuing his career in diplomacy, Ruslan Bolbocean became the First Secretary and Counselor of the Eastern Europe and Asia Division, Bilateral Cooperation Department at MFAEI from 2004 to 2006. Subsequently, he took on the responsibility of Deputy Head of Mission and Counselor at the Embassy of the Republic of Moldova to the Russian Federation from 2006 to 2009.

In 2009, he became the Head of the Eastern Europe and Asia Division till 2011, when he earned the position of Deputy Head of the General Directorate for Bilateral Cooperation at MFAEI.

From 2015 to 2021, Ruslan Bolbocean held the position of Ambassador of the Republic of Moldova to Ukraine. Additionally, from 2016 to 2021, he served as the Ambassador of the Republic of Moldova to the Republic of Armenia, Republic of Uzbekistan, and Turkmenistan, with residence in Kyiv.

== Education ==
Ruslan Bolbocean pursued higher education at the Nicolae Testemițanu State University of Medicine and Pharmacy of the Republic of Moldova, where he graduated in 1997. However, his passion for international affairs led him to further his studies at the International Relations Faculty of the Academy of Public Administration of the Republic of Moldova, where he completed his studies from 1997 to 1999.

In the year 2000, he attended the George C. Marshall European Center for Security Studies in Germany, where he successfully completed a course in international security. Between 2009 and 2013, Ruslan Bolbocean pursued his doctoral studies at Moldova State University.

In 2010, he attended the OSCE Summer Academy in Stadtschlaining, Austria.

In 2011, he participated in an International Course on reconstruction and post-conflict stabilization, organized by the Ministry of Foreign Affairs of Romania.

Ruslan Bolbocean is fluent in English, Ukrainian, and Russian.

== Honours and awards ==
- 2013 - Diploma of first grade, Government of the Republic of Moldova
- 2020 - "Diplomatic merit" Medal II rank, MFAEI
