= Embassy of Moldova, Bucharest =

Embassy of Moldova in Bucharest
- Location: Bucharest, Romania
- Address: Bulevardul Eroilor nr. 8, Sector 5
- Coordinates: 44.43369°N 26.071371°E
- Ambassador: Mihai Mîțu
- Website: romania.mfa.gov.md

The Embassy of Moldova in Bucharest is the diplomatic mission of Moldova to Romania. The embassy provides consular services to Moldovan citizens residing or traveling in Romania, Serbia, and Montenegro.

== Overview ==
On 21 June 2010, the Acting President of Moldova, Mihai Ghimpu, signed a decree appointing Iurie Reniță the new ambassador of Moldova in Romania.

== List of ambassadors ==
- Aurelian Dănilă (1992–1994)
- Grigore Eremei (1994–1998)
- Emil Ciobu (1998–2003)
- Victor Zlacevschi (2004–2005)
- Lidia Guțu (2006–2009)
- Iurie Reniță (2010–2015)
- Mihai Gribincea (2015–2020)
- Victor Chirilă (2021–2025)
- Mihai Mîțu (2026–present)

== See also ==
- Moldovan–Romanian relations
- List of diplomatic missions of Moldova

== Gallery ==
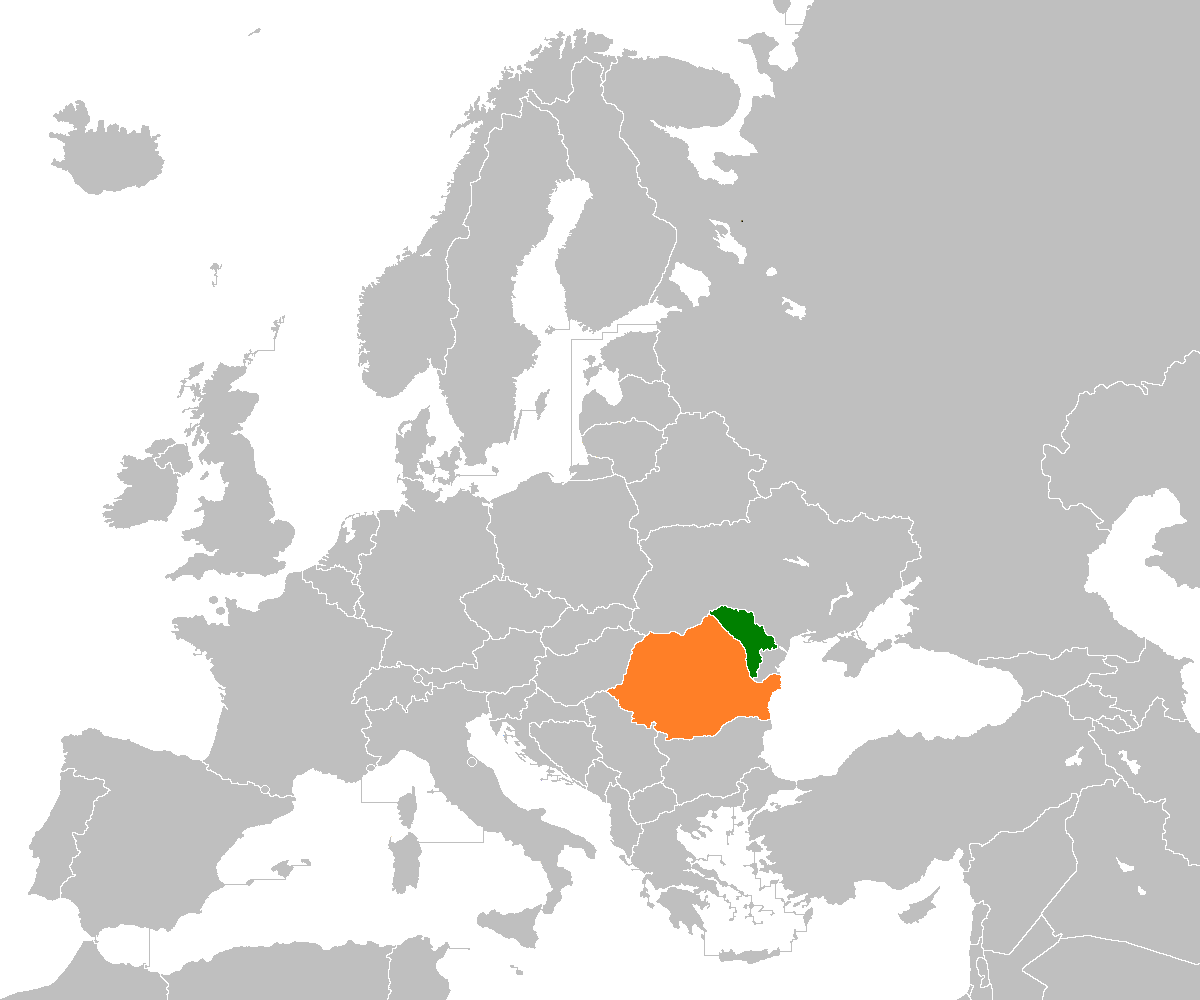
