= Bahrynivka =

Village in Chernivtsi Oblast, Ukraine

Bahrynivka Багринівка Bahrinești (in Romanian)
- Village
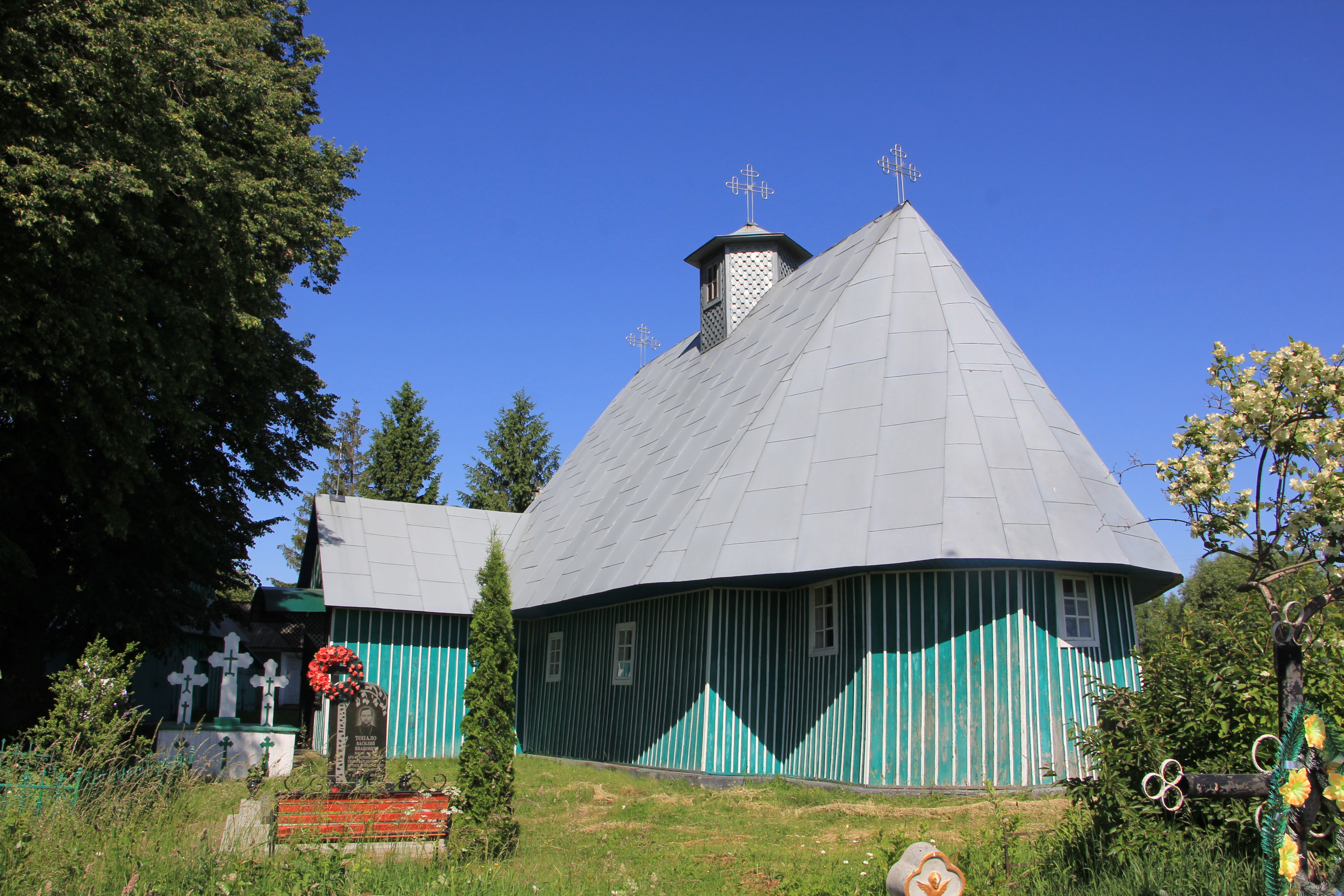
- Church of the Holy Trinity (1883)
- Interactive map of Bahrynivka
- Location in Chernivtsi Oblast Location in Ukraine
- Coordinates: 47°59′0.96″N 25°56′35.88″E
- Country: Ukraine
- Oblast: Chernivtsi Oblast
- Raion: Chernivtsi Raion
- Hromada: Kamianka rural hromada
- Elevation: 399 m (1,309 ft)

Population
  - Total: 1,456
- Time zone: UTC+2 (EET)
  - Summer (DST): UTC+3 (EEST)
- Postal code: 60441
- Area code: +380 3734
- KOATUU: 7321080101

Bahrynivka (Ukrainian: Багринівка; Romanian: Bahrinești; German: Bahrinestie) is a village in Chernivtsi Raion, Chernivtsi Oblast, Ukraine. It belongs to Kamianka rural hromada, one of the hromadas of Ukraine.

Until 18 July 2020, Bahrynivka belonged to Hlyboka Raion. The raion was abolished in July 2020 as part of the administrative reform of Ukraine, which reduced the number of raions of Chernivtsi Oblast to three. The area of Hlyboka Raion was merged into Chernivtsi Raion. According to the 2001 census, the majority of the population of Bahrinești commune spoke Romanian (96.36%), with a minority of Ukrainian speakers (3.23%).
