= List of ambassadors of Ukraine to Moldova =

Ambassador of Ukraine to Moldova

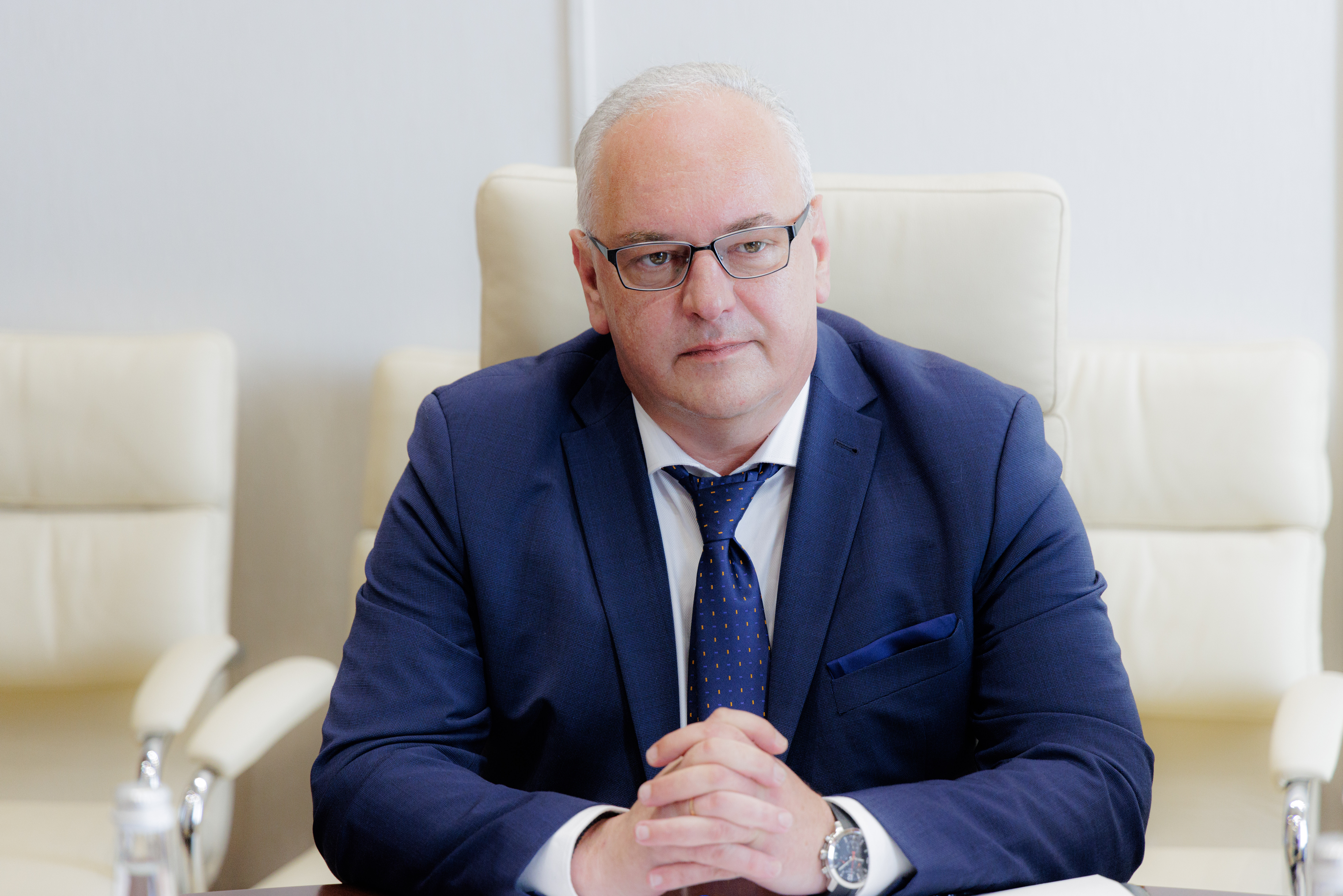
- Incumbent; Paun Rohovei since 2025
- Nominator: Volodymyr Zelenskyy
- Inaugural holder: Vitaliy Boiko as Ambassador Extraordinary and Plenipotentiary
- Formation: 1992
- Website: Ukraine Embassy - Chișinău

The Ambassador Extraordinary and Plenipotentiary of Ukraine to Moldova (Ukrainian: Надзвичайний і Повноважний посол України в Молдові) is the ambassador of Ukraine to Moldova. The current ambassador is Paun Rohovei. He assumed the position in 2025.

The first Ukrainian ambassador to Moldova assumed his post in 1999, the same year a Ukrainian embassy opened in Chișinău.

== List of ambassadors ==
=== Ukraine ===
- 1993–1994 – Vitaliy Boiko
- 1994–1996 – Yevhen Levytsky
- 1996–2000 – Ivan Hnatyshyn
- 2000–2007 – Petro Chalyi
- 2007–2014 – Serhiy Pyrozhkov
- 2014–2015 – Hennadiy Altukhov
- 2015–2019 – Ivan Hnatyshyn
- 2019–2024 – Marko Shevchenko
- Since 2025 – Paun Rohovei
