= Gustav Jenner =

German composer and musical scholar (1865–1920)

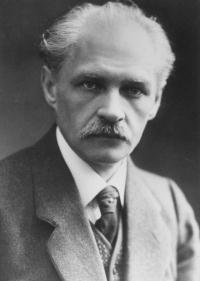
Gustav Jenner.

Gustav Jenner (3 December 1865 – 29 August 1920), born Cornelius Uwe Gustav Jenner was a German composer, conductor and musical scholar. He was the only formal composition pupil of Johannes Brahms.

== Biography ==
Jenner was born in Keitum on the island of Sylt, then part of the Kingdom of Prussia. His father, a doctor, came from a Scottish family: he claimed descent from Edward Jenner, the discoverer of smallpox vaccine, and was related to the family who built the eponymous Art-Nouveau style department store which is one of the landmarks of Edinburgh's Princes Street. While at school in Kiel, Jenner started to teach himself to write music but, after his father committed suicide in 1884 (he had been accused of abusing female patients), he was befriended and assisted by the poet Klaus Groth, who arranged for him to study with Brahms's old teacher Eduard Marxsen in Hamburg. Marxsen in his turn handed Jenner over to Brahms, with whom he studied in Vienna from February 1888 to 1895, also receiving instruction from Eusebius Mandyczewski. Though Brahms was a merciless critic of Jenner's compositional attempts, he took great care over his welfare. He had him appointed Secretary of the Vienna Tonkünstlerverein and in 1895 arranged for him to become musical director and conductor at the University of Marburg, where he spent the rest of his career despite invitations to assume more prestigious posts in Breslau and Berlin. It was in Marburg that he died.

As a composer, Jenner concentrated on chamber music (three string quartets, a piano quartet, a trio for clarinet, horn and piano, three violin sonatas, a cello sonata and other works), choral pieces and songs. Though his music is highly conservative for his time and shows a strong Brahmsian imprint, he was capable of individual expression and his works are always finely wrought. Other than his works for voice, few of these works were published in his lifetime. His String Quartet No. 3 in F major has been published by Schott Music and his Piano Quartet in F major has been published by Edition Silvertrust. There is also a Serenade in A major for orchestra (1911–12), Jenner's only orchestral work.

Jenner published two volumes of recollections of Brahms, Brahms als Mensch, Lehrer und Künstler (Brahms as Man, Teacher and Artist) (Marburg, 1905) which, viewing Brahms from a unique vantage point, are a valuable biographical source.

Selected passages from Jenner's recollections are available in English translation in Walter Frisch (ed.), Brahms and His World (Princeton, 1990); ISBN 0-691-02713-7

== Recordings ==
- CPO CD 999 699-2 containing his three String quartets, Piano Quartet in F major and Trio in E flat major for horn, cello and piano
- CRC CD 1133 where his Trio in E-flat Major for horn, cello and piano is recorded
- Divox CDX-29806 contain his three violin sonatas
- Divox CDX-29106 contain his Cello Sonata in D major
- MDG 603 1343-2 containing his Trio in E flat major for horn, cello and piano and Sonata in G major, Op. 5 for clarinet and piano
