= Victor Chirilă =

Moldovan diplomat (born 1971)

Moldovan Ambassador to Ukraine and Armenia
- Incumbent
- Assumed office 2 February 2026
- President: Maia Sandu
- Prime Minister: Alexandru Munteanu; Eugen Osmochescu (acting); Vasile Tofan
- Preceded by: Valeriu Chiveri

Moldovan Ambassador to Romania, Montenegro and Serbia
- In office 5 November 2021 – 4 December 2025
- President: Maia Sandu
- Prime Minister: Natalia Gavrilița; Dorin Recean; Alexandru Munteanu
- Preceded by: Mihai Gribincea
- Succeeded by: Mihai Mîțu

Personal details
- Born: 12 August 1971 (age 55) Lăpușna, Moldavian SSR, Soviet Union
- Education: University of Iași; National University of Political Studies and Public Administration; University of Edinburgh

Victor Chirilă (born 12 August 1971) is a Moldovan diplomat. He is the current Moldovan Ambassador to Ukraine.
