= Embassy of Moldova, Kyiv =

Embassy of the Republic of Moldova to Ukraine
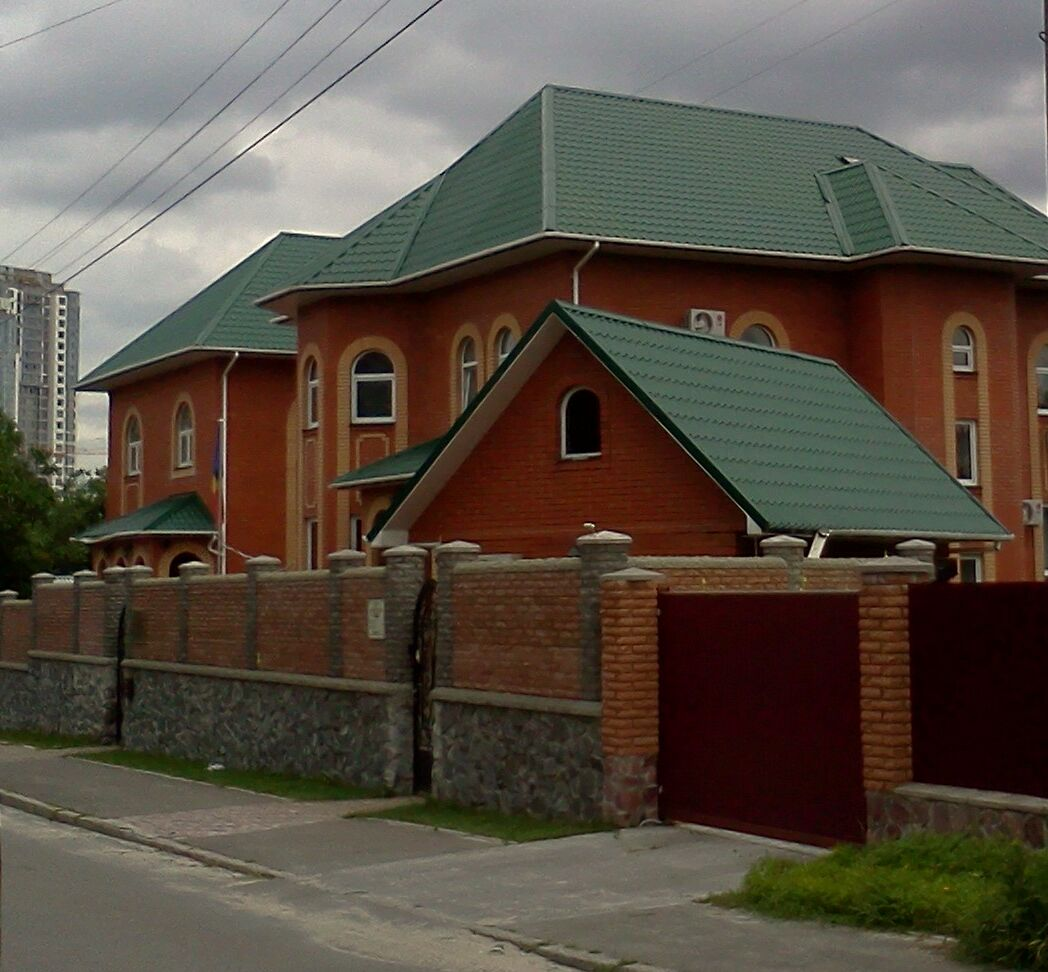
- Location: Kyiv
- Address: Yagotinska St., 2, Kyiv 01901, Ukraine
- Ambassador: Victor Chirilă

The Embassy of the Republic of Moldova to Ukraine is the diplomatic mission of the Republic of Moldova to Ukraine, which also functions as the non-resident embassy of Moldova to Armenia, Turkmenistan, Uzbekistan.

== History ==
Diplomatic relations between Ukraine and Moldova have been established on 10 March 1992. The Embassy of Ukraine, Chișinău was opened in 1992. The Embassy of the Republic of Moldova in Kyiv was opened in 1992. During the 2022 Russian invasion of Ukraine, the embassy was closed on 4 March 2022 and reopened on 15 April 2022.

== Previous Ambassadors ==
- Ion Borșevici (1993–1994)
- Ion Russu (1994–1998)
- Alexei Andrievschi (1998–2003)
- Nicolae Cernomaz (2003–2005)
- Mihail Laur (2006)
- Sergiu Stati (2006–2009)
- Nicolae Gumenîi (2009–2010)
- Ion Stăvilă (2010–2015)
- Ruslan Bolbocean (2015–2021)
- Valeriu Chiveri (2021–2025)
- Victor Chirilă (2026–present)

== See also ==
- Moldova-Ukraine relations
- Foreign relations of Moldova
- Foreign relations of Ukraine
- Embassy of Ukraine, Chișinău
- Diplomatic missions in Ukraine
- Diplomatic missions of Moldova
