= Gustav Nottebohm =

German musicologist (1817–1882)

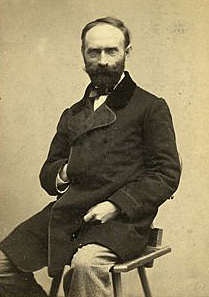

Martin Gustav Nottebohm (12 November 1817 – 29 October 1882) was a German musicologist, teacher and composer who spent most of his career in Vienna. He is particularly celebrated for his studies of Beethoven.

== Life and career ==
Martin Gustav Nottebohm was born in Lüdenscheid, Westphalia on 12 November 1817. He studied in Leipzig, where he met Mendelssohn and Schumann, and settled in Vienna in 1846. There, he studied composition and counterpoint under the renowned theorist Simon Sechter. In 1862 he met Brahms, who became a lifelong friend; Brahms cared for Nottebohm in his last illness and took care of the arrangements for his funeral. Nottebohm was a pioneer researcher in what are now described as 'Beethoven studies'. He sought out Beethoven relics and produced an important 'thematic catalogue' of Beethoven's works. His greatest contribution, however, is probably his series of essays and commentaries on several of the musical 'sketchbooks' in which Beethoven notated and elaborated his initial ideas. The last of Nottebohm's publications on this subject appeared posthumously in 1887, edited by his former pupil Mandyczewski. Nottebohm died on 29 October 1882 in Graz.

Writing of Nottebohm's investigations into Beethoven's sketches, the later Beethoven scholar Joseph Kerman evaluated him in the following terms: "He made some mistakes, but it is to be doubted whether many musical scholars have maintained so high a standard of accuracy and objectivity, and so sharp a sense of the relevant, in treating a similar mass of difficult material".

Nottebohm's scholarly efforts were not confined to Beethoven, however. He published a thematic catalogue of Schubert's works and was an avid collector of Baroque and pre-Baroque music both vocal and instrumental. Brahms inherited some of his collection and bequeathed it, along with his own library, to the Gesellschaft der Musikfreunde in Vienna.

Nottebohm's own compositions were mainly in the fields of chamber and piano music. The latter includes a set of Variations on a Sarabande of J.S. Bach for piano duet, which he often performed with Brahms. In a letter to Heinrich von Herzogenberg dated 20 August 1876, Brahms numbers Nottebohm (in the same sentence with Schumann) among the modern practitioners of variation form.
