= Valeriu Chiveri =

Moldovan diplomat (born 1963)

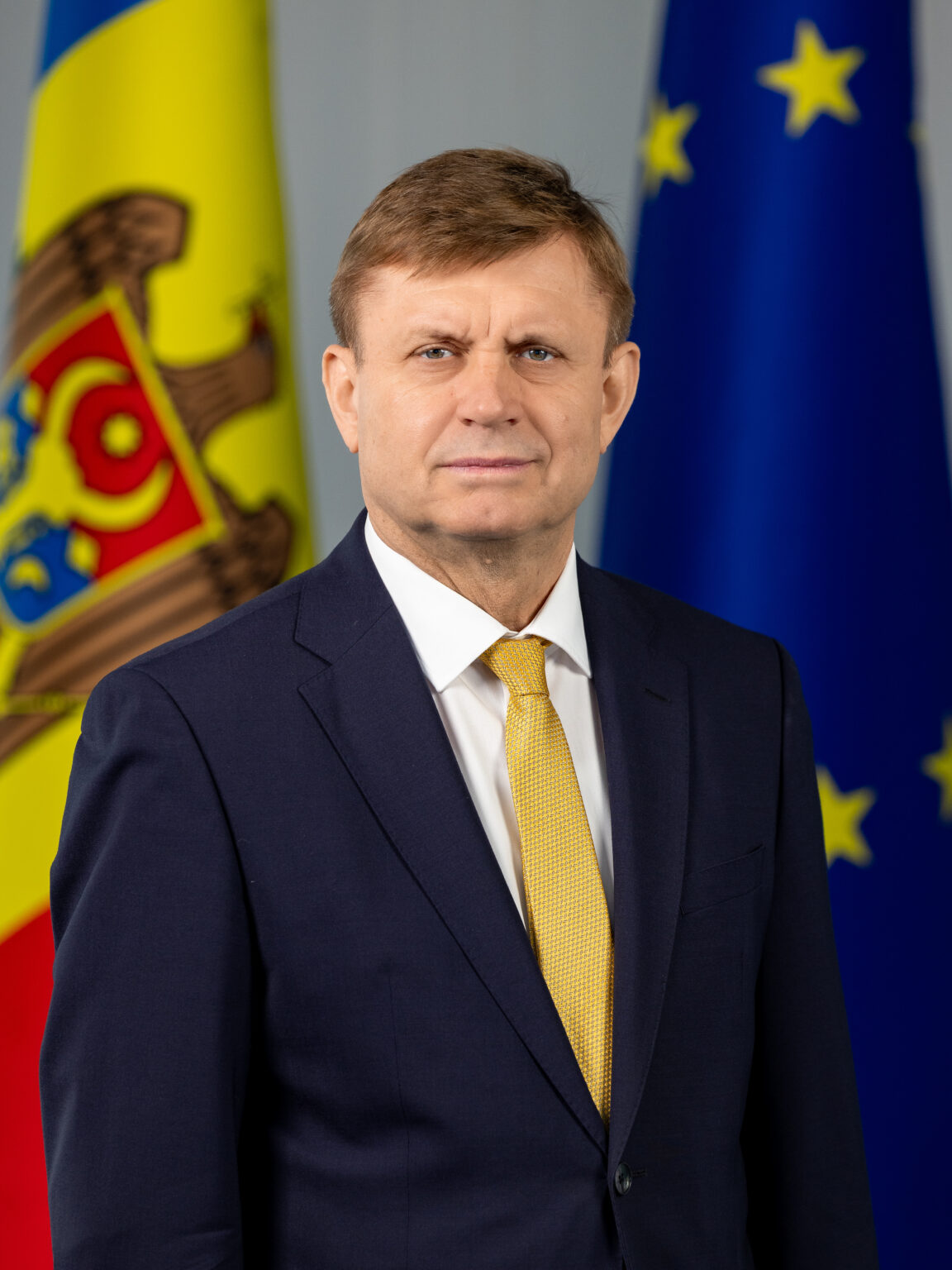
- Official portrait, 2025

Deputy Prime Minister of Moldova for Reintegration
- Incumbent
- Assumed office 1 November 2025
- President: Maia Sandu
- Prime Minister: Alexandru Munteanu; Eugen Osmochescu (acting); Vasile Tofan
- Preceded by: Roman Roșca

Moldovan Ambassador to Ukraine, Armenia, Turkmenistan and Uzbekistan
- In office 28 December 2021 – 1 November 2025
- President: Maia Sandu
- Prime Minister: Natalia Gavrilița; Dorin Recean
- Preceded by: Ruslan Bolbocean
- Succeeded by: Victor Chirilă

Deputy Minister of Foreign Affairs and European Integration
- In office 12 June 2013 – 11 March 2015
- President: Nicolae Timofti
- Prime Minister: Iurie Leancă; Chiril Gaburici
- Minister: Natalia Gherman

Moldovan Ambassador to Austria, Slovakia and the OSCE
- In office 21 June 2010 – 12 July 2013
- President: Mihai Ghimpu (acting); Vlad Filat (acting); Marian Lupu (acting); Nicolae Timofti
- Prime Minister: Vlad Filat; Iurie Leancă
- Preceded by: Victor Postolachi
- Succeeded by: Andei Popov

Personal details
- Born: 26 December 1963 (age 62) Florești, Moldavian SSR, Soviet Union
- Education: Moldova State University; Technical University of Moldova; National University of Political Studies and Public Administration

Valeriu Chiveri (born 26 December 1963) is a Moldovan diplomat, and the current Deputy Prime Minister for Reintegration of Moldova.

Chiveri studied at Moldova State University, National University of Political Studies and Public Administration and Technical University of Moldova.

He was formerly the Ambassador of the Republic of Moldova to Austria and Slovakia, starting his duties in 2010.

On June 12, 2013, Chiveri was named Deputy Minister of Foreign Affairs and European Integration.

He was appointed Ambassador to Ukraine in February 2022.
