= Abaclia =

- Village
- Location in Moldova
- Coordinates: 46°22′N 28°57′E
- Country: Moldova
- District: Basarabeasca District

Population (2014 census)
  - Total: 4,660
- Time zone: UTC+2 (EET)
  - Summer (DST): UTC+3 (EEST)

Abaclia is a rural village in the Basarabeasca District, in Southern Moldova. The village is part of a key livestock and dairy region, contributing significantly to Moldova's sheep and goat milk industry. Predominantly Moldovan and Orthodox Christian, Abaclia's history reflects a blend of local and Tatar influences.

== Historical background ==
Abaclia was first documented in 1770. The village's name is rooted in local legend and Tatar heritage. According to tradition, the name comes from a merchant who passed through the area with a cart of aba (a valuable woolen cloth), which he gifted to the villagers as part of a marriage agreement. However, linguistic research suggests the name is derived from the Tatar tribe abaklî, reflecting the region's historical Tatar presence and the naming practices of Russian authorities after the 1812 annexation of Bessarabia.

== Demographics ==
According to the 2014 Moldovan census, Abaclia had a population of 4,660 residents. The village covers an area of 73.90 km², resulting in a population density of 63.06 people per square kilometer. The gender distribution in the village was fairly balanced, with 2,257 males (48.4%) and 2,403 females (51.6%). The age structure reveals a predominantly working-age population, with 3,487 individuals (74.8%) aged between 15 and 64 years. Children aged 0-14 years accounted for 792 individuals (17%), while the elderly population, aged 65 and over, made up 381 individuals (8.2%).

Abaclia is entirely rural, with no urban population recorded. The majority of residents were born in Moldova (98%), while a small percentage came from the European Union (0.5%) and the Commonwealth of Independent States (1.5%).

Ethnically, Abaclia is predominantly Moldovan, comprising 92.5% of the population. Other ethnic groups include Romanians (5.5%), Ukrainians (0.3%), Russians (0.5%), Gagauzians (0.8%), Bulgarians (16 individuals), and Romani people (6 individuals). In terms of language, the vast majority of the population speaks Moldovan, with 75.2% using it as their native language. Romanian is spoken by 22.5% of the residents, while smaller groups speak Russian (1.4%), Gagauzian (0.6%), and Bulgarian (11 individuals).

Religiously, the village is overwhelmingly Orthodox Christian, with 99.5% of the population adhering to this faith. A small minority, comprising 21 individuals (0.5%), follow other religions.

== Economy ==
Abaclia is a central part of the Cimișlia-Basarabeasca livestock and dairy micro-cluster, which is a leader in Moldova's sheep and goat milk industry. The region specializes in sheep and goat farming, with a significant proportion of Moldova’s sheep and goats raised there, and milk and cheese production, including the largest sheep and goat milk processing plant in the country. It also hosts the "Mioriță laie" national festival, the largest event in Moldova's sheep and goat sector. In 2023, Abaclia and its neighboring localities contributed more than 5% of Moldova's sheep and goat cheese production. The livestock sector supports about 50 jobs locally. The area is also a center for agricultural innovation and modernization, though it faces challenges such as outdated technology and underutilized processing capacity.

== Notable people ==
- Iurie Reniță, Moldovan Ambassador to Romania
