= Nicolae Cernomaz =

Moldovan diplomat (1949–2023)

Moldovan Ambassador to Ukraine, Azerbaijan and Georgia
- In office 31 March 2003 – 25 January 2005
- President: Vladimir Voronin
- Prime Minister: Vasile Tarlev
- Preceded by: Alexei Andrievschi
- Succeeded by: Mihail Laur

Minister of Foreign Affairs
- In office 22 November 2000 – 27 July 2001
- President: Petru Lucinschi; Vladimir Voronin
- Prime Minister: Dumitru Braghiș; Vasile Tarlev
- Preceded by: Nicolae Tăbăcaru
- Succeeded by: Nicolae Dudău

Moldovan Ambassador to Hungary, Slovenia, Croatia and the Czech Republic
- In office 28 January 1999 – 22 November 2000
- President: Petru Lucinschi
- Prime Minister: Ion Ciubuc; Ion Sturza; Dumitru Braghiș
- Preceded by: Alexei Andrievschi
- Succeeded by: Mihail Laur

Minister of State
- In office 24 January 1997 – 28 January 1999
- President: Petru Lucinschi
- Prime Minister: Ion Ciubuc
- Preceded by: Gheorghe Gusac
- Succeeded by: Vladimir Filat

Personal details
- Born: 14 December 1949 Țiganca, Moldavian SSR, Soviet Union
- Died: 6 April 2023 (aged 73) Chișinău, Moldova

Nicolae Cernomaz (14 December 1949 – 6 April 2023) was a Moldovan diplomat who served as Minister of Foreign Affairs of Moldova from 2000 until 2001. He also served as the ambassador of Moldova to a number of countries.
