= Bozovici coal mine =

Underground coal mine in Romania

Bozovici Coal mine
- Location within Romania

Location
- Location: Bozovici, Caraș-Severin County, Romania; 44°59′55.56″N 21°58′31.45″E (estimated)

Production
- Products: Coal

Owner
- Company: National Hard Coal Company

Bozovici Coal Mine is an underground mining exploitation, one of the largest in Romania located in Bozovici in the south-western part of Caraș-Severin County. The legal entity managing the Bozovici mine is the National Hard Coal Company which was set up in 1998. The mine has reserves of 30 million tonnes of coal.

== See also ==
- Jiu Valley
- League of Miners Unions of the Jiu Valley
