= Nicolae Dudău =

Moldovan politician

Moldovan Ambassador to Italy
- In office 4 February 2004 – 12 June 2007
- President: Vladimir Voronin
- Prime Minister: Vasile Tarlev
- Preceded by: Valentin Ciumac
- Succeeded by: Gheorghe Rusnac

Minister of Foreign Affairs
- In office 3 September 2001 – 4 February 2004
- President: Vladimir Voronin
- Prime Minister: Vasile Tarlev
- Preceded by: Nicolae Cernomaz
- Succeeded by: Andrei Stratan

Moldovan Ambassador to Belarus, Estonia, Latvia and Lithuania
- In office 29 September 1998 – 24 September 2001
- President: Petru Lucinschi; Vladimir Voronin
- Prime Minister: Ion Ciubuc; Ion Sturza; Dumitru Braghiș; Vasile Tarlev
- Preceded by: Ion Leșanu
- Succeeded by: Ilie Vancea

1st Moldovan Ambassador to Uzbekistan, Tajikistan and Kyrgyzstan
- In office 8 November 1994 – 9 February 1998
- President: Mircea Snegur; Petru Lucinschi
- Prime Minister: Andrei Sangheli; Ion Ciubuc
- Succeeded by: Nicolae Osmochescu

Personal details
- Born: 19 December 1945 (age 80) Grinăuți, Moldavian SSR, Soviet Union
- Children: 1
- Education: Chisinau Technical University; Party Institute of Political Studies
- Profession: Politician, diplomat

Nicolae Dudău (pronunciation: [nikoˈla.e duˈdəw], born 19 December 1945) is a Moldovan politician and diplomat. He is a former Minister of Foreign Affairs of Moldova.

== Early life and career ==
He was born on 19 December 1945 in Grinăuți, Edineț County, in the Moldovan SSR. He graduated from the Sergey Lazo Polytechnic Institute in Chișinău (now the Technical University of Moldova) as a mechanical engineer in 1975. He also did a course in politicial studies at the Higher School of Party in Moscow in 1982. In 1963–1975, Dudău performed various technical functions at the Tractor Enterprise of Chșinău. Since 1975, he has become a political activist in different Party's bodies and state organs of the Republic of Moldova: Head of Section of the District Committee, Instructor of the Central Committee and Head of Section at the Central Committee. From 1988 to 1990 he was the Deputy Chairman of the State Planning Committee of the Moldovan SSR. From 1990 to 1991, he was the First Secretary of the Chișinău City Committee of the Communist Party of Moldova and finally Executive Director of the International Charity Association.

In 1993–1994, he served as the Counselor at the Embassy of Moldova in Russia, and then, in 1994, became the ambassador of Moldova to Uzbekistan, Tajikistan and Kyrgyzstan for concurrent positions. In 1997, Dudău was appointed the First Deputy Minister of Foreign Affairs of Moldova. He was appointed the Moldovan Ambassador to Belarus, Latvia, Lithuania and Estonia on 29 September 1998. On 3 September 2001, by decree of President Vladimir Voronin, Nicolae Dudău was appointed the Minister of Foreign Affairs in the first government of Vasile Tarlev. On 12 June 2002, he was given the diplomatic rank of ambassador. On 4 February 2004, he resigned from the position of the minister, and 5 days later, Dudău was appointed as Ambassador of Moldova to Italy, a position he held until 2007.

== Personal life ==
He is currently married and has one daughter. Apart from his native language of Moldovan, he also speaks English and Russian.
