= Molodiia =

Village in Chernivtsi Oblast, Ukraine

Molodiia Молодія
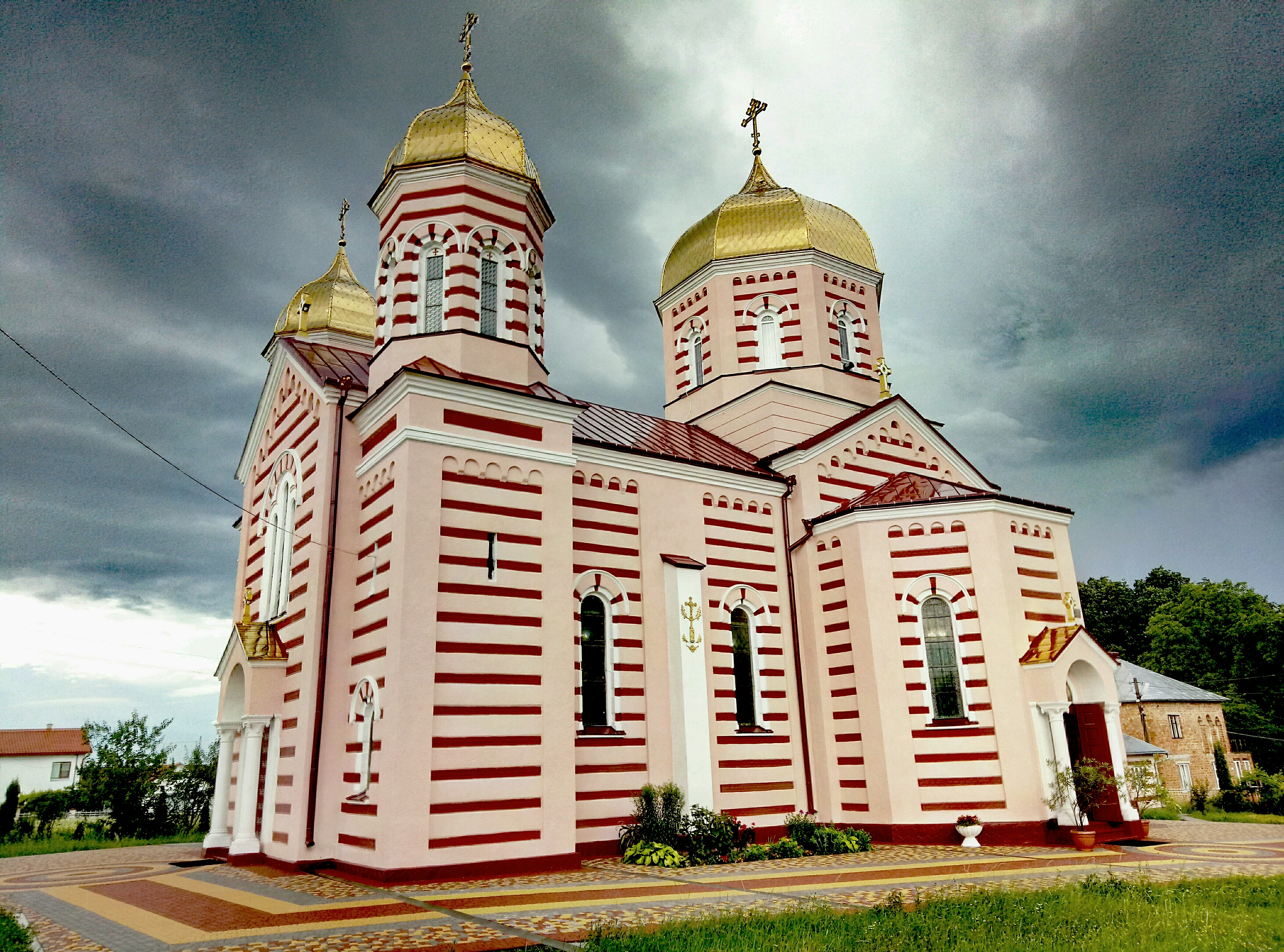
- Exaltation of the Holy Cross church

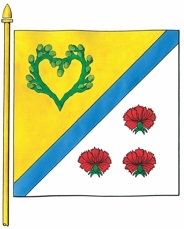
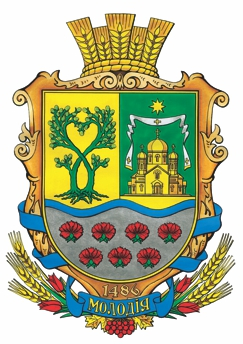
- Flag Coat of arms
- Interactive map of Molodiia
- Location of Molodiya Molodiia (Ukraine)
- Coordinates: 48°13′39″N 26°1′26″E
- Country Oblast Raion: Ukraine; Chernivtsi Oblast; Chernivtsi Raion
- Elevation: 235 m (771 ft)

Population (2024)
  - Total: 3,997
- Time zone: UTC+2 (EET)
  - Summer (DST): UTC+3 (EET)
- Postal code: 60415

Molodiia (Ukrainian: Молодія, Romanian: Plaiul Cosminului) is a village in Chernivtsi Raion, Chernivtsi Oblast (province) of western Ukraine. It is composed of a single village, Molodiia. It belongs to Chahor rural hromada, one of the hromadas of Ukraine.

== History ==
This was first officially attested in a document dated 1486.

In May 1944, the inhabitants of Molodiia were given the choice of declaring their nationality or ethnicity as "Romanian" or "Moldovan", and were pressed to choose the "Moldovan" nationality/ethnicity. In May 1944, in the village of Molodiia and some other northern Bukovinian localities, those men who declared a "Moldovan" nationality were incorporated into the Soviet army, while those who declared a "Romanian" nationality were sent to the work camps in the area of Lake Onega, where most of them died. The broader context was that on October 11, 1942, the (Soviet) State Committee on Defense decided to extend the decrees on "the mobilization of the NKVD labour columns, German men, able to work, 17-50 years old - to the persons of other nations, being in war with USSR-Romanians, Hungarians, Italians, Finns."; the order was signed by Stalin. The Soviet era dominance of the "Moldovan" identity was due to the fact that the inhabitants of the Chernivtsi and Sadagura rural raions, of the Bukovinian part of the Novoselytsia rural raion, as well as of Ukrainian northern Bessarabia, were pressured in 1944 to adopt a "Moldovan" national/ethnic identity.

Until 18 July 2020, Molodiia belonged to Hlyboka Raion. The raion was abolished in July 2020 as part of the administrative reform of Ukraine, which reduced the number of raions of Chernivtsi Oblast to three. The area of Hlyboka Raion was merged into Chernivtsi Raion. In 2001, 55.52% of the 3,822 inhabitants of Molodiia spoke Romanian, or 2,122 people (48.06%, or 1,837 people, self-identified it as Moldovan and 7.46%, or 285 people, as Romanian) as their native language, while 43.54% (or 1,664 people) spoke Ukrainian. In 1992-1993, the school students at the local Ukrainian-language school, the only one in the locality, included 22.96% Ukrainians (135 students), 58.5% Romanians (344 students), and 17.35% Moldovans (102 students). In 1989, the population was 30.74% ethnically Ukrainian, 5.72% self-identified ethnically Romanian, and 61.96% self-identified ethnically Moldovan. The data suggests that the increase in the proportion of self-identified ethnic Romanians and self-identified Romanian speakers at the expense of the self-identified Moldovans and self-identified Moldovan-speakers was more common among the younger generation.

== Population ==
- 1930 — 3960
- 1989 — 3741
- 2007 — 3847
