= Vitaliy Boiko =

Ukrainian lawyer and diplomat (1937–2020)

- Віталій Бойко

Chairman of the Supreme Court of Ukraine
- In office 21 December 1994 – 24 October 2002
- Preceded by: Heorhiy Butenko
- Succeeded by: Vasyl Malyarenko

Minister of Justice of Ukraine
- In office 2 August 1990 – 20 March 1992
- President: Leonid Kravchuk (from 1991)
- Prime Minister: Vitaliy Masol; Vitold Fokin
- First Secretary: Stanislav Hurenko (until 1991)
- Preceded by: Volodymyr Zaichuk
- Succeeded by: Volodymyr Kampo

Ambassador of Ukraine to Moldova
- In office 1993–1994
- President: Leonid Kravchuk
- Prime Minister: Leonid Kuchma; Vitaliy Masol
- Preceded by: Position established
- Succeeded by: Yevhen Levytskyi (provisional)

Personal details
- Born: 30 September 1937 Kropyvne, Ukrainian SSR, Soviet Union (now Ukraine)
- Died: 30 January 2020 (aged 82)
- Education: Kharkiv Law Institute
- Occupation: Politician, jurist, diplomat

Vitaliy Fedorovych Boiko (Ukrainian: Віталій Федорович Бойко; 30 September 1937 – 30 January 2020) was a Ukrainian lawyer, diplomat, and Minister of Justice.

Boiko was from Chernihiv Oblast. He graduated from Yaroslav Mudryi National Law University in 1963 and until 1976 worked as a judge in Dnipropetrovsk and then until 1986 as a judge in Donetsk.

In 1986 to 1992 Boiko worked in Ministry of Justice and held ministerial post. Concurrently with that he also headed the Central Electoral Commission. In 1993–1994 Boiko served as an Ambassador of Ukraine to Moldova. In 1994–2002 he was a chairman of the Supreme Court of Ukraine.

He was awarded the Honorary Award of the President of Ukraine, the forerunner of the Order of Merit.

Political offices
Preceded by ?	Head of the Central Election Commission of Ukraine; 1989–1993	Succeeded by Ivan Yemets
Preceded by Volodymyr Zaichuk	Minister of Justice of Ukraine; 1990–1992	Succeeded by Volodymyr Kampo
Preceded by post created	Ambassador of Ukraine to Moldova; 1993–1994	Succeeded by Yevhen Levytsky
Preceded by Heorhiy Butenko	Chairperson of the Supreme Court of Ukraine; 1994–2002	Succeeded by Vasyl Malyarenko
