= Valia Kuzmyna =

Commune in Chernivtsi Oblast, Ukraine

Coordinates: 48.1836°N 26.0183°E

A view of the village.

Valia Kuzmyna (Ukrainian: Валя Кузьмина; Romanian: Valea Cosminului) is a commune (selsoviet) in Chernivtsi Raion, Chernivtsi Oblast, Ukraine. It is composed of a single village, Valya Kuzmina. It belongs to Voloka rural hromada, one of the hromadas of Ukraine.

Until 18 July 2020, Valia Kuzmyna belonged to Hlyboka Raion. The raion was abolished in July 2020 as part of the administrative reform of Ukraine, which reduced the number of raions of Chernivtsi Oblast to three. The area of Hlyboka Raion was merged into Chernivtsi Raion.

In 2001, 43.19% (or 805) of the 1,864 inhabitants of Valia Kuzmyna spoke Romanian (out of which 655, or 35.14%, called it Romanian, as their native language, and 150, or 8.05%, called it Moldovan) while 54.18% (or 1010) spoke Ukrainian, and 40 (or 2.15%) spoke Russian. According to the 1989 Soviet census, the number of inhabitants who declared themselves Romanians was 138 (8.34%), while 907 (54.80%) said that they were Moldovans, 564 said that they were Ukrainians (34.08%) and 27 (1.63%) that they were Russians, out of 1,655. In 1992–1993, in the Ukrainian-language school in the locality, there were 241 students, out of which, 142 had a Romanian ethnic identity (58.92%) and 18 had a Moldovan ethnic identity (7.47%). There has been no Romanian school in the village, but only a Ukrainian one, and number of self-identified Romanians and Moldovans have been linguistically Ukrainianized. A large percentage of the population switched their declared census identities from Moldovan and Moldovan-speaking to Romanian and Romanian-speaking between the 1989 and 2001 censuses. The Soviet era dominance of the "Moldovan" identity in Valia Kuzmyna, reversed after 1989, was due to the fact that the inhabitants of the Chernivtsi and Sadagura rural raions, and of the Bukovinian part of the Novoselytsia rural raion, were pressured in 1944 to adopt a "Moldovan" national/ethnic identity.

In 2001, the Volokivska rural community, of which Valia Kuzmyna was a part of, had 6,086 inhabitants, including 4,919 Romanian-speakers (80.82%, including 4,749 self-identified Romanian-speakers, or 78.03% and 170 self-identified Moldovan-speakers, or 2.79%), 1,090 Ukrainian-speakers (17.91%), and 55 Russian-speakers (0.9%).
