= Nicolae Tăbăcaru =

Moldovan politician (born 1955)

Moldovan Ambassador to Germany, Denmark and Sweden
- In office 8 February 2001 – 14 October 2003
- President: Petru Lucinschi; Vladimir Voronin
- Prime Minister: Dumitru Braghiş; Vasile Tarlev
- Preceded by: Aurelian Dănilă
- Succeeded by: Igor Corman

Minister of Foreign Affairs
- In office 28 July 1997 – 22 November 2000
- President: Petru Lucinschi
- Prime Minister: Ion Ciubuc; Ion Sturza; Dumitru Braghiș
- Preceded by: Mihai Popov
- Succeeded by: Nicolae Cernomaz

Foreign Policy Advisor to the President
- In office 17 January 1997 – 28 July 1997
- President: Petru Lucinschi
- Preceded by: Petru Dascăl
- Succeeded by: Iurie Pînzaru

Personal details
- Born: 20 August 1955 (age 70) Cioara-Murza, Ukrainian SSR, Soviet Union
- Profession: Diplomat

Nicolae Tăbăcaru (pronunciation: [nikoˈla.e təbəˈkaru], born 20 August 1955) is a Moldovan politician, who served as foreign minister of Moldova from 28 July 1997 to 23 November 2000.
