= Hlyboka Raion =

Former subdivision of Chernivtsi Oblast, Ukraine

Hlyboka Raion Глибоцький район
- Raion
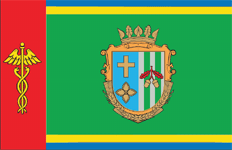
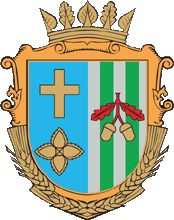
- Flag Coat of arms

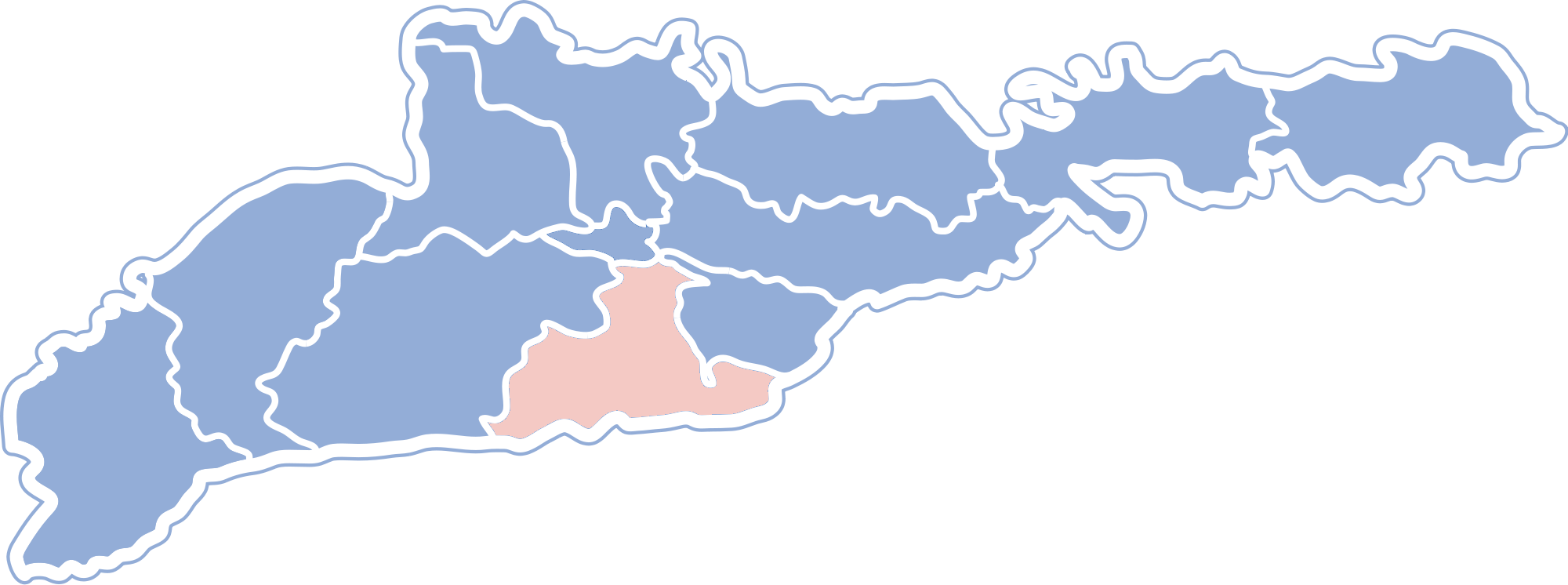
- Coordinates: 48°4′23″N 25°57′33″E
- Country: Ukraine
- Region: Chernivtsi Oblast
- Disestablished: 18 July 2020
- Admin. center: Hlyboka
- Subdivisions: List: — city councils; — settlement councils; — rural councils; Number of localities: — cities; — urban-type settlements; 37 — villages; — rural settlements

Government
  - Governor: N/A

Area
  - Total: 673 km^{2} (260 sq mi)

Population (2020)
  - Total: 74,131
  - Density: 110/km^{2} (285/sq mi)
- Time zone: UTC+02:00 (EET)
  - Summer (DST): UTC+03:00 (EEST)
- Postal index: 604-XX
- Area code: 380-3734X
- Website: Official website

Hlyboka Raion (Ukrainian: Глибоцький район; Romanian: Raionul Adâncata pronounced [raˈjonul adɨŋˈkata]) is a former administrative district of Chernivtsi Oblast located in the historical regions of Bukovina and Hertsa, in western Ukraine. The administrative center was the urban-type settlement of Hlyboka. There were 37 villages in the raion. The population of the raion according to the 2001 Census was 72,682 inhabitants, its area covers 686 square kilometres (265 mi^{2}). The raion was abolished on 18 July 2020 as part of the administrative reform of Ukraine, which reduced the number of raions of Chernivtsi Oblast to three. The area of Hlyboka Raion was merged into Chernivtsi Raion. The last estimate of the raion population was 74,131 (2020 est.) In 1962, Hertsa Raion was abolished and merged into Hlyboka Raion, and in 1991, it was re-established.

According to the Ukraine Census (2001), the 72,676 residents of the raion reported themselves as following: Ukrainians: 34,025 (46.82%), Romanians: 32,923 (45.3%), Moldovans: 4,425 (6.09%), Russians: 877 (1.21%), and others: 426 (0.59%). Hlyboka raion, within its boundaries at that time, had 72,676 inhabitants in 2001, including 52.56% Ukrainian-speakers, 45.97% Romanian-speakers, and 1.15% Russian-speakers. In 1989, in the last Soviet census of 1989, out of 68,009 inhabitants, 27,407 declared themselves Ukrainians (40.3%), 29,042 Romanians (42.7%), 9,644 Moldovans (14.18%), and 1,363 Russians (2%). The decline in the number (from 9,644 to 4,425) and proportion of self-identified Moldovans (from 14.18% to 6.09%) was explained by a switch from a census Moldovan to a census Romanian ethnic identity, and has continued after the 2001 census. By contrast, the number of self-identified ethnic Romanians has increased (from 29,042 to 32,923), and so has their proportion of the population of the former raion (from 42.7% to 45.3%), and the process has continued after the 2001 census. In 1992-1993, in the Ukrainian-language schools in the raion, there were 5,338 students, out of which 2,093 had a Romanian ethnic identity (39.21%) and 154 had a Moldovan ethnic identity (2.88%). Some authors have argued that many, probably most, of the inhabitants of the former Hlyboka Raion who had self-identified themselves as Moldovans in 1989 self-identified themselves as Romanians in 2001. In three of the seven villages with a majority or plurality of self-identified ethnic Moldovans before 1989, most people declared their native language as Romanian rather than Moldovan in 2001 (in comparison to one village in 1989); in the seven villages, 3,250 self-identified their native language as Moldovan, and 6,292 as Romanian, in 2001, whereas in 1989, 3,252 identified themselves as ethnic Romanians and 8,024 as ethnic Moldovans.

According to the 2001 Ukrainian census, in the Hlyboka settlement community, which was created in 2020 and had a population of 18,897 according to the census, and whose capital was Hlyboka, 70.39% of the inhabitants spoke Ukrainian as their native language, or 13,301 people, while 27.48%, or 5,193 people, spoke Romanian (including 5,117 who called it Romanian, or 27.08%, and 76 called it Moldovan, or 0.4%), and 1.91%, or 271 people, spoke Russian.

Since the Hertsa raion split from the Hlyboka raion in 1991, after the 1989 Soviet census, we do not have the breakdown of the inhabitants of the Hlyboka Raion by native language in 1989. The former Hlyboka Raion has become by now mostly ethnically Ukrainian, as it was earlier predicted, though it was mostly Romanian plus Moldovan in 2001. In 2001, only two other raions in Ukraine that were mostly Romanian plus Moldovan by self-identification, including Hertsa Raion (mostly Romanian) and Novoselytsia Raion (mostly Moldovan).

In a number of localities, there was a massive change from Moldovan to Romanian and linguistic identities. In 2001, 97.56% of the inhabitants of the village of Voloka in the former Hlyboka Raion spoke Romanian as their native language (2,960 called it Romanian and 1 called it Moldovan), while 2.08% spoke Ukrainian. In the 1989 census, the number of residents of Voloka who declared themselves Romanian plus Moldovan was 2,907 (1,060 Romanians, or 33.68% plus 1,847 Moldovans, or 58.69%), representing 92.37% of the locality's population of 3,147. In 2001, 43.19% (or 805) of the 1,864 inhabitants of Valia Kuzmyna in the former Hlyboka Raion spoke Romanian (out of which 655, or 35.14%, called it Romanian, as their native language, and 150, or 8.05%, called it Moldovan) while 54.18% (or 1010) spoke Ukrainian, and 40 (or 2.15%) spoke Russian. According to the 1989 Soviet census, the number of inhabitants who declared themselves Romanians was 138 (8.34%), while 907 (54.80%) said that they were Moldovans, 564 said that they were Ukrainians (34.08%) and 27 (1.63%) that they were Russians, out of 1,655. A similar pattern could also be seen in the village of Hrushivka, in the same commune as Voloka (see the article on Voloka). Another locality where a significant amount of identity change from Moldovan and Moldovan-speaking to Romanian and Romanian-speaking took place was Molodiia (see the details in the article on that village). More people retained a Moldovan ethnic and linguistic identity than switched to a Romanian one in the villages of Koroviia, Molodiia, and Chahor (see the articles on the respective villages) as well as in the village of Privoroky (see the article on the village of Tarashany).

The raion also had 34 public hospitals and clinics.

At the time of disestablishment, the raion consisted of eight hromadas:

- Chahor rural hromada with the administration in the selo of Chahor;
- Hlyboka settlement hromada with the administration in Hlyboka;
- Kamianka rural hromada with the administration in the selo of Kamianka;
- Karapchiv rural hromada with the administration in the selo of Karapchiv;
- Sucheveny rural hromada with the administration in the selo of Sucheveny;
- Tarashany rural hromada with the administration in the selo of Tarashany;
- Terebleche rural hromada with the administration in the selo of Terebleche;
- Voloka rural hromada with the administration in the selo of Voloka.

At the 2001 census, out of 6,086 individuals who lived in the Voloka rural hromada, 1,090 were Ukrainian-speaking (17.91%), 4,929 were Romanian-speaking (80.99%), including 4,759 who called the language Romanian (78.2%) and 170 who called it Moldovan (2.79%), and 40 were Russian-speaking (0.66%). In 1989, out 5,928 inhabitants, 821 (13.85%) were ethnic Ukrainians, 1,693 were ethnic Romanians (28.56%), 3,348 were ethnic Moldovans (56.48%) and 44 were Russians (0.74%).

== See also ==
- Subdivisions of Ukraine
