= Mihai Popov =

Moldovan diplomat

Molodvan Ambassador to Belgium, Luxembourg, United Kingdom, Republic of Ireland, NATO and the European Commission
- In office 1 October 2002 – 29 September 2004
- President: Vladimir Voronin
- Prime Minister: Vasile Tarlev
- Preceded by: Ion Căpățînă
- Succeeded by: Victor Gaiciuc
- In office July 1993 – 5 April 1994
- President: Mircea Snegur
- Prime Minister: Andrei Sangheli
- Succeeded by: Tudor Botnaru

1st Moldovan Ambassador to France, Spain and Portugal
- In office 25 July 1997 – 30 September 2002
- President: Petru Lucinschi; Vladimir Voronin
- Prime Minister: Ion Ciubuc; Ion Sturza; Dumitru Braghiș; Vasile Tarlev
- Succeeded by: Andrei Neguța

Minister of Foreign Affairs
- In office 5 April 1994 – 24 July 1997
- President: Mircea Snegur; Petru Lucinschi
- Prime Minister: Andrei Sangheli; Ion Ciubuc
- Preceded by: Nicolae Țîu
- Succeeded by: Nicolae Tăbăcaru

Personal details
- Born: 1 October 1949 (age 77) Cioburciu, Moldavian SSR, Soviet Union
- Children: Andrei Popov
- Education: Moldova State University; Diplomatic Academy of the Ministry of Foreign Affairs of the USSR

Mihai Popov (born 1 October 1949) is a Moldovan diplomat. He has served as Moldovan Ambassador in various diplomatic missions. He was Minister of Foreign Affairs of Moldova in the second Sangheli Cabinet.
