= Union of Bulgarians in Transnistria =

Non-governmental organization

The Union of Bulgarians in Transnistria, also calling itself the Historical and Human Rights Center of Bulgaria, is a non-governmental organization based in Transnistria whose leader is Alene Nikolayev, an ethnic Bulgarian born in Transnistria. The union is composed of ethnic Bulgarians. Of the 35 nationalities represented in Transnistria, ethnic Bulgarians represent less than 2 percent.

== See also ==
- Union of Moldovans in Transnistria
- Union of Russian Communities in Transnistria
- Union of Ukrainians in Transnistria
