= Union of Russian Communities in Transnistria =

Non-governmental organization

The Union of Russian Communities in Transnistria is a non-governmental organization based in Transnistria. Its chairman is the archpriest Dionisiy Abramov, an ethnic Russian born in Transnistria.

The union is composed of ethnic Russians. It acts as a federation of local clubs and civic organizations of ethnic Russians and their community groups throughout Transnistria.

Of the 35 nationalities represented in Transnistria, ethnic Russians make up 30.3 percent. Along with ethnic Ukrainians (28.8 percent), Slavs form a majority of the population in Transnistria.

== See also ==
- Union of Bulgarians in Transnistria
- Union of Moldovans in Transnistria
- Union of Ukrainians in Transnistria
