= Union of Ukrainians in Transnistria =

Non-governmental organization

The Union of Ukrainians in Transnistria is a non-governmental organization based in Transnistria. Its president is Vladimir Bodnar, an ethnic Ukrainian born in Transnistria.

The union is composed of ethnic Ukrainians. It acts as a federation of local clubs and civic organizations of Ukrainians throughout Transnistria. It represents the minority population in conferences abroad, and has secured the support of the Kyiv-based World Congress of Ukrainians which publicly declared its readiness to "protect Transnistria's right to independence".

Of the 35 nationalities represented in Transnistria, ethnic Ukrainians make up 28.8 percent. Along with ethnic Russians (30.3 percent), Slavs form a majority of the population in Transnistria.

== See also ==
- Union of Bulgarians in Transnistria
- Union of Moldovans in Transnistria
- Union of Russian Communities in Transnistria
