= Union of Moldovans in Transnistria =

Non-governmental organization

The Union of Moldovans in Transnistria (Romanian: Uniunea moldovenilor din Transnistria) is a non-governmental organization based in Transnistria. Its 2005–2006 president was Valerian Tulgara, a Moldovan born in the Bessarabian part of Moldavian SSR.

The union is composed of ethnic Moldovans. It is the largest group of Moldovans in Transnistria. It acts as a federation of local clubs and civic organizations of Moldovans throughout Transnistria. The Union of Moldovans Of Transnistria was founded in 1993. It held its fourth national congress in Tiraspol, April 2006, with 420 delegates present. The previous third congress of the Union took place during March 2003.

The statements of the Union of Moldovans in Transnistria have consistently supported independence and sovereign statehood for Transnistria. In an attempt to let the position of its membership be heard, the organisation organised participation during the 2005 election in the Republic of Moldova. It accused the Moldovan authorities of voting obstruction and of violating the rights of the Moldovan citizens living in Transnistria. It claims that transportation was provided to 14,800 voters but stated that only some of them were allowed to vote. Individuals with old Soviet passport who did not the stamp "citizen of the Republic of Moldova" faced difficulties in voting.

The Moldovan organization's opposition to unification with Moldova was repeated in an open letter issued October 19, 2006, to Moldova's President Vladimir Voronin in which the Union of Moldovans ask for Transnistria's de facto independence to be recognized de jure.

Of the 35 nationalities represented in Transnistria, ethnic Moldovans make up a relative majority of 31.9 percent.

== See also ==
- Union of Bulgarians in Transnistria
- Union of Russian Communities in Transnistria
- Union of Ukrainians in Transnistria
