= Valerian Tulgara =

Transnistrian politician (born 1956)

Valerian Tulgar is a politician from Transnistria. He is a member of parliament and president of the Union of Moldovans in Transnistria.

Valerian Tulgar was born November 27, 1956, in Bessarabia, in the village of Sărătenii Vechi, Teleneşti district of Moldova.
