= Gazprombank (Transnistria) =

A branch of Gazprombank in Rîbnița, northern Transnistria.

Gazprombank (Transnistria) is a large Transnistrian bank with headquarters in Tiraspol. It was established in 1993 with a capital of US$5.5 million. It is claimed to be a subsidiary of Russia's Gazprombank (Russian: АКБ Газпромбанк, sometimes transcribed as Gasprombank), although Gazprombank has not confirmed the ownership officially.

It has approximately 500 corporate clients in Transnistria, among them Tiraspoltransgaz. In addition to its corporate clients, the bank is also a retail bank, offering mortgages and credit cards through branches in Transnistria's major cities.

The bank works with five corresponding banks abroad. It is also a Transnistrian partner of a number of international payment systems: Western Union, MIGOM, Anelik, Fast Mail, Contact, and Leader for money transfers.
