= 2004 census =

2004 census may refer to:

- 2004 Moldovan census
- 2004 Moroccan census
- 2004 Transnistrian census
