= Vladimir Bodnar =

Transnistrian politician (born 1942)

Volodymyr Lukich Bodnar (Russian: Владимир Лукич Боднар; Ukrainian: Володимир Лукич Боднар, romanized: Volodymyr Lukych Bodnar; born 26 December 1942) is a Transnistrian politician and community leader. He is co-chairman of the Joint Control Commission which was formed to oversee the negotiated ceasefire following the 1992 War of Transnistria. He is a former member and deputy speaker of parliament (2001–2005) and president of the Union of Ukrainians in Transnistria. While in parliament, he was head of the parliamentary committee on security and defense.

== Biography ==
Vladimir Bodnar was born in Stara Ushytsia, Kamenets-Podolsk region of the Ukrainian SSR on December 26, 1942. He is a Ukrainian. After graduating from the Financial College in Chernivtsi, he worked in the Moldovan SSR Financial-Budget Administration.

In 1982 he graduated from Odesa National Institute of Economics, specializing in labor economics and then working in agricultural organizations in Grigoriopol district. He was elected deputy to the People's Deputies' Rural Soviet and vice-president of the Grigoriopol District Executive Committee and the Provisional Supreme Soviet of the self-proclaimed Moldovan Dniester Republic.

Vladimir Bodnar is a founding member of the Union of Ukrainians in Transnistria, serving as prime vice president (1991-1998) and president (1998-2004). He was dismissed from the leadership position at the end of 2004. He is a staunch opponent of attempts to unify Transnistria and Moldova and has at times advocated the incorporation of Transnistria into Ukraine.
