= Sărătenii Vechi =

- Commune and village
- Location in Moldova
- Coordinates: 47°32′N 28°33′E
- Country: Moldova
- District: Telenești District

Population (2014)
  - Total: 2,531
- Time zone: UTC+2 (EET)
  - Summer (DST): UTC+3 (EEST)

Sărătenii Vechi is a commune in Telenești District, Moldova. It is composed of two villages, Sărătenii Vechi and Zahareuca.

== Notable people ==
- Vasile Anestiade
- Boris Focșa
- Ludmila Balan
- Valerian Tulgara
