= Demographic history of Transnistria =

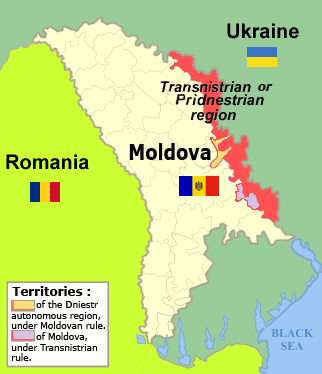
The region around actual Transnistria (in red)

A demographic history of Transnistria shows that Transnistria has been home to numerous ethnic groups, in varying proportions, over time.

== Ethnicity prior to 1792 ==
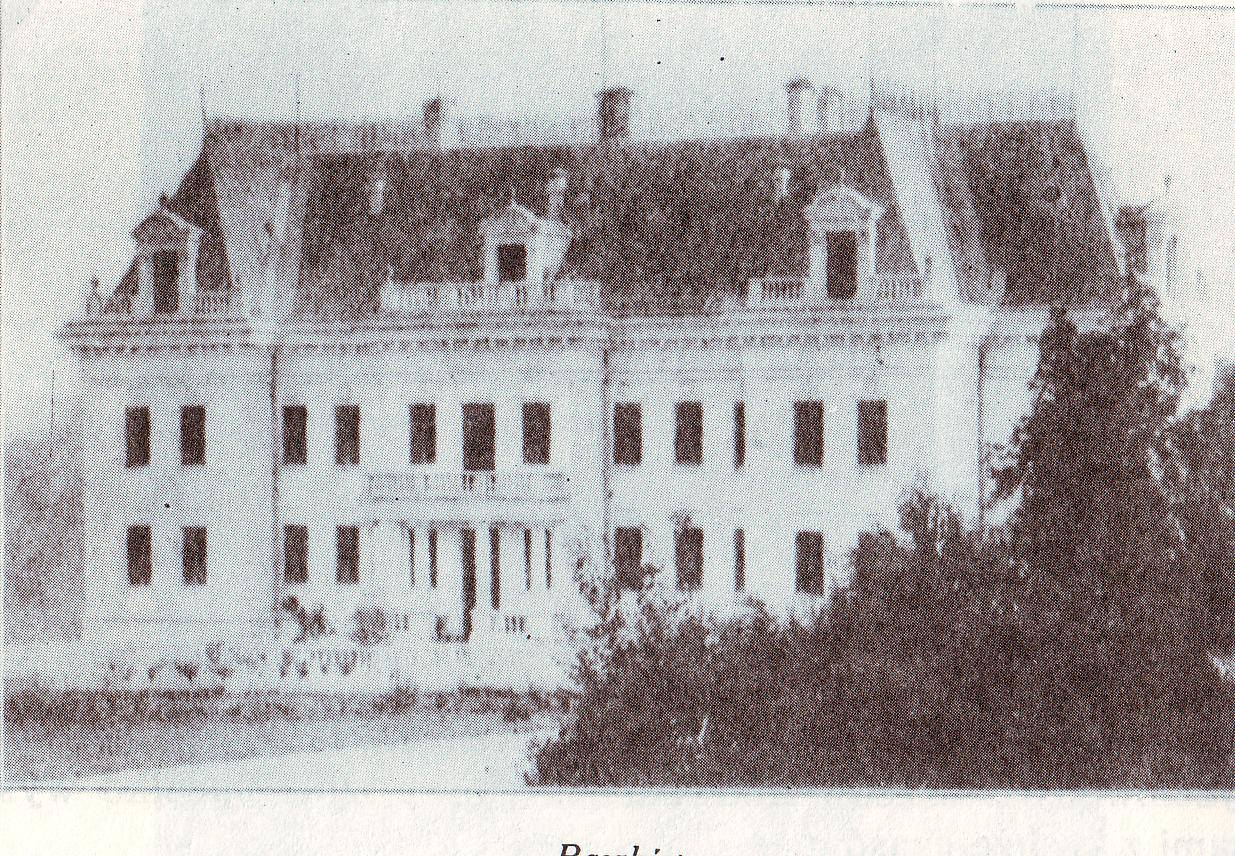
The now demolished Juriewicz Palace in Rașcov was a testament to the Polish presence in Transnistria, which is centered in that area of Moldova.

The word "Transnistria" means literally "lands beyond the Dniester" (called "Nistru" in the Romanian language). These lands are historically related to the neo-Latin populations that lived east of the Dniester River.

In the coastal area of these lands, during the Roman Empire, there were small cities of nearly 5,000 inhabitants such as Tyras and Olbia. Roman colonists settled in these areas under the protection of Roman legionaries. The interior of Transnistria was sparsely populated by eastern European tribal groups. The region between the Dniester River and the Bug River, having a steppe topography, was continuously subjected to invasion during the Middle Ages by imperial and tribal forces.

Beside the droughty periods typical for the region, the second reason for the underpopulation of the Black Sea northern shores is the vicinity of the Tatars. Their presence, both military and civil, impeded the settling of the east European type life and blocked the Moldavian or even Polish expansion to the east. The Transnistrian lands settled in the Middle Ages by Romanians were only partially and temporarily ruled by Moldavian princes or possessions of the Moldavian Principality. Probably those Romanians living east of the Dniester were only a few thousands.

Many Romanians lived even farther east in the steppe lands of Transnistria (Land over Nistru), scattered (mainly) in small rural settlements. Transnistria was in the past an arid, underpopulated region that began to be colonized in the Middle Ages (after 1500, probably, but possibly even earlier) by Romanians that crossed the Dniester/Nistru river in search of free land and by some Tartars, its borders not being delimited as for a distinctive entity, a part of something. In the east of river Dniester the Romanian life is mentioned all over the Middle Ages. The oldest attested Romanian possession over the Dniester River was the Lerici castle (at the entrance inside Dnieper's estuary, where the fortress Ochakov was later on to be built), captured by some Romanian pirates from the Genoese in the times of voivod Petru Aron (in 1455).

The steppe around the Bug river was mostly depopulated in the 13th and 14th centuries because of the Golden Horde, according to some travelers (like in the "Chorographia Moldaviae" of Georg Reicherstorfer, written in 1541). They found there only some Vlach (Romanian) shepherds and a few Romanian and Slav villages.

Meanwhile, the Romanian colonization east of Dniester – that had started around the year 1000 AD – had reached the Kiev area in the 15th century and in 1712 even the Don river, with the Dimitrie Cantemir leadership.

Ethnically the area of Transnistria between the Dniester and the Bug rivers – even if depopulated – was probably 2/3 Romanian speaking (while between the Bug and the Dnieper rivers most of the population was Slavic), when Russia started to conquer it. Indeed, according to the results of the census (quoted in Romanian sources) of 1793 AD, 49 villages out of 67 between the Dniester and the Bug were Romanian.

== Russian Empire period (1792–1917) ==
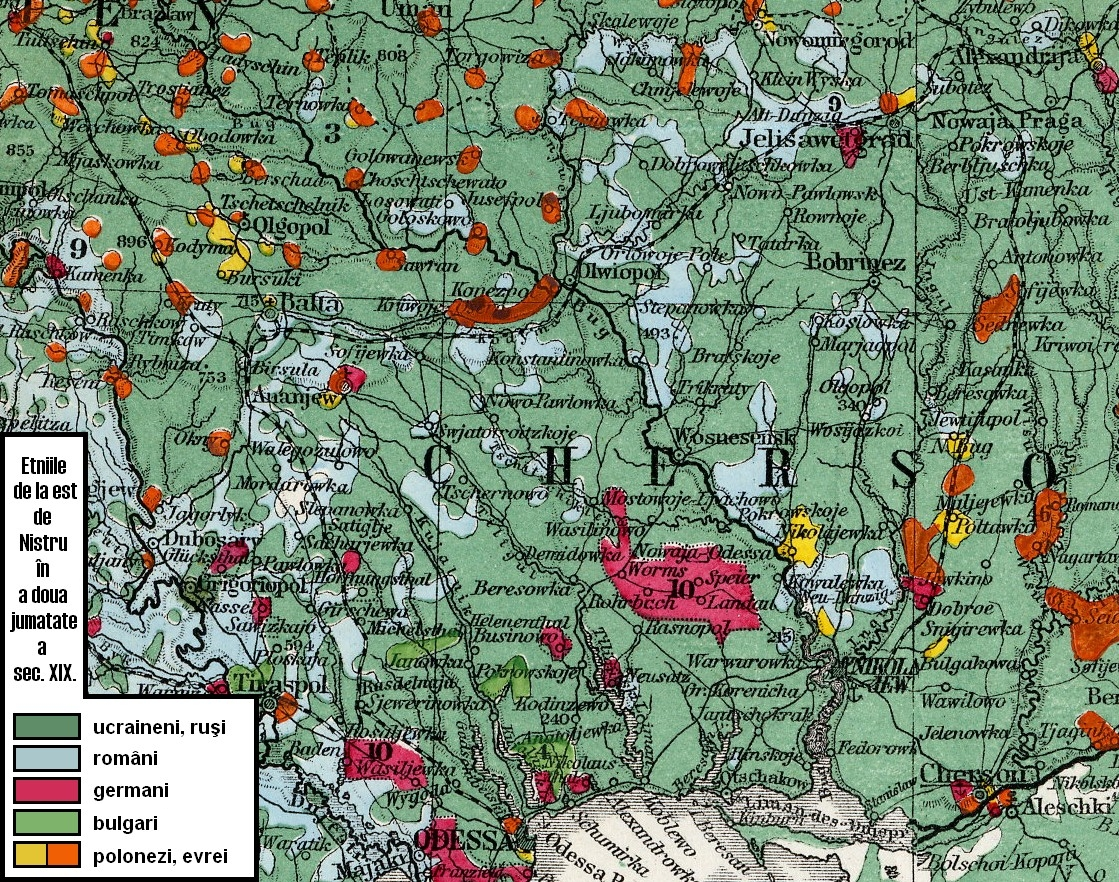
Ethnic map of Transnistria (1870)

In 1792, the whole territory between the Dniester and the Bug rivers (that historically was part of the Yedisan territory of the expelled Nogais) became part of the Russian Empire. At that time, the population was sparse and the Russian Empire encouraged large migrations into the region, including ethnic Ukrainians, Romanians, Russians and Germans.

Russia began attempting to lure Romanian settlers (mostly from Moldavia, but also from Transylvania, Bukovina and Muntenia) to settle in its territory in 1775. But the colonization was to a larger scale after 1792, to Transnistria and beyond, when the Russian government declared that the region between the Dniester and the Bug was to become a new principality named "New Moldavia", under Russian suzerainty.

After 1812, Russia annexed from Moldavia a territory which became known as Bessarabia (located west of the Dniester and up to the Prut River), while a process of russification started to be done with the Romanian populations east of the Dniester River (Transnistria).

== Soviet and post-Soviet periods (1917 to present) ==
Since the Soviet era, Transnistria is home to three major groups: Romanians forming a plurality alongside Russians and Ukrainians.

Historically, after one century of russification, the Romanians were no more the majority of population in the areas of the Moldavian Autonomous Soviet Socialist Republic (MASSR) established, in 1924, within the Ukrainian SSR. MASSR was limited to some areas east of the Dniester, until Balta. East of Balta, most of the Romanians – settled there since the end of Tartar attacks in the 16th century – were already assimilated by the Slavs in the early 20th century (but there were nearly 100,000 Moldovan speaking living east of the MASSR and up to the Dnieper river).

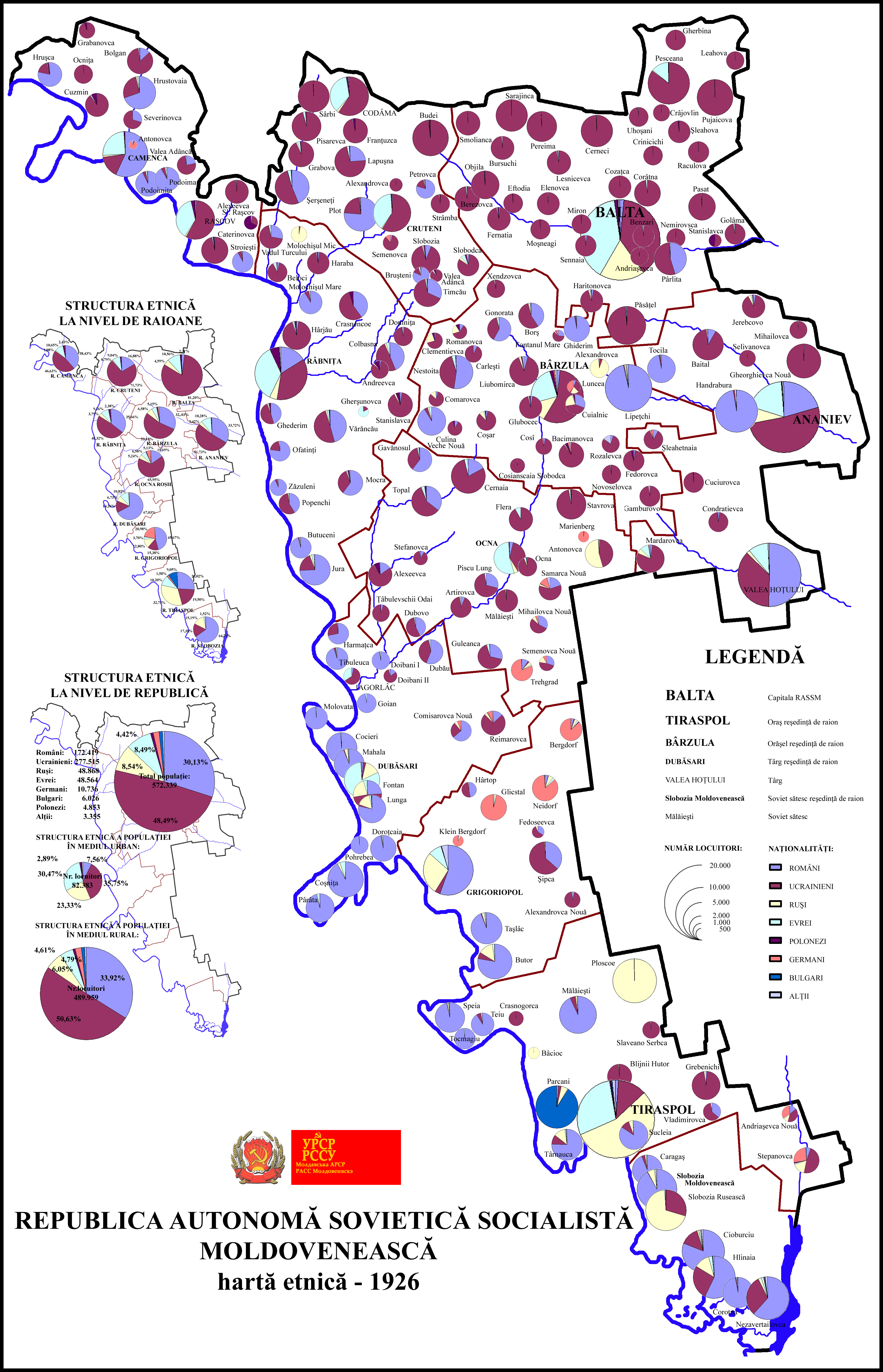
Ethnic groups in Moldavian Autonomous Soviet Socialist Republic (1924–1940)

According to the 1926 Soviet census, the Moldavian ASSR had a population of 572,339, of which:

Ethnic group	census 1926		1936	
Ethnic group	Number	%	Number	%
Ukrainians	277,515	48.5%	265,193	45.5%
Moldovans	172,419	30.1%	184,046	31.6%
Russians	48,868	8.5%	56,592	9.7%
Jews	48,564	8.5%	45,620	7.8%
Germans	10,739	1.9%	12,711	2.2%
Bulgarians	6,026	1.1%		
Poles	4,853	0.8%		
Romani	918	0.2%		
Romanians	137	0.0%		
Other	2,300	0.4%	13,526	2.4%
Total	572,339		582,138	

Despite this relatively extensive territory allotted to the MASSR, more than 85,000 Romanians remained in Ukraine (and Soviet Russia) outside the territory of MASSR.

1941 Romanian census including the Transnistria Governorate

In 1941, during World War II, when Romania created the Transnistria Governorate, an extended territory from the Dniester up to the Bug, most of the population was Ukrainian/Russian and only nearly 10% was Romanian. In this way, from 1941 to 1944 the Romanian "irredentism" had obtained the union of nearly 200,000 ethnic Romanians to their motherland, after the loss of Northern Transylvania to Hungary. Even Odessa was subject to Romanian administration, as the city had been made part of Transnistria Governorate.

In December 1941, Romanian authorities conducted a census in the Transnistria Governorate, and the ethnic structure was the following:

Ethnicity	Number	%	Rural	Urban
Ukrainians	1,775,273	76.3	79.9	57.4
Moldovans	197,685	8.4	9.3	4.4
Russians	150,842	6.5	2.4	27.9
Germans	126,464	5.4	5.9	2.7
Bulgarians	27,638	1.2	1.1	1.4
Jews	21,852	0.9	0.7	2.0
Poles	13,969	0.6	0.3	2.3
Lipovens	968	–	–	0.1
Tatars	900	–	–	0.1
Others	10,628	0.5	10.2	1.7
Total	2,326,224^{*}	100	1,956,557	369,669

When the Soviet reconquered the area in 1944, they created the Moldavian Soviet Socialist Republic (with around half of the former MASSR included), where ethnic Romanians were the majority.

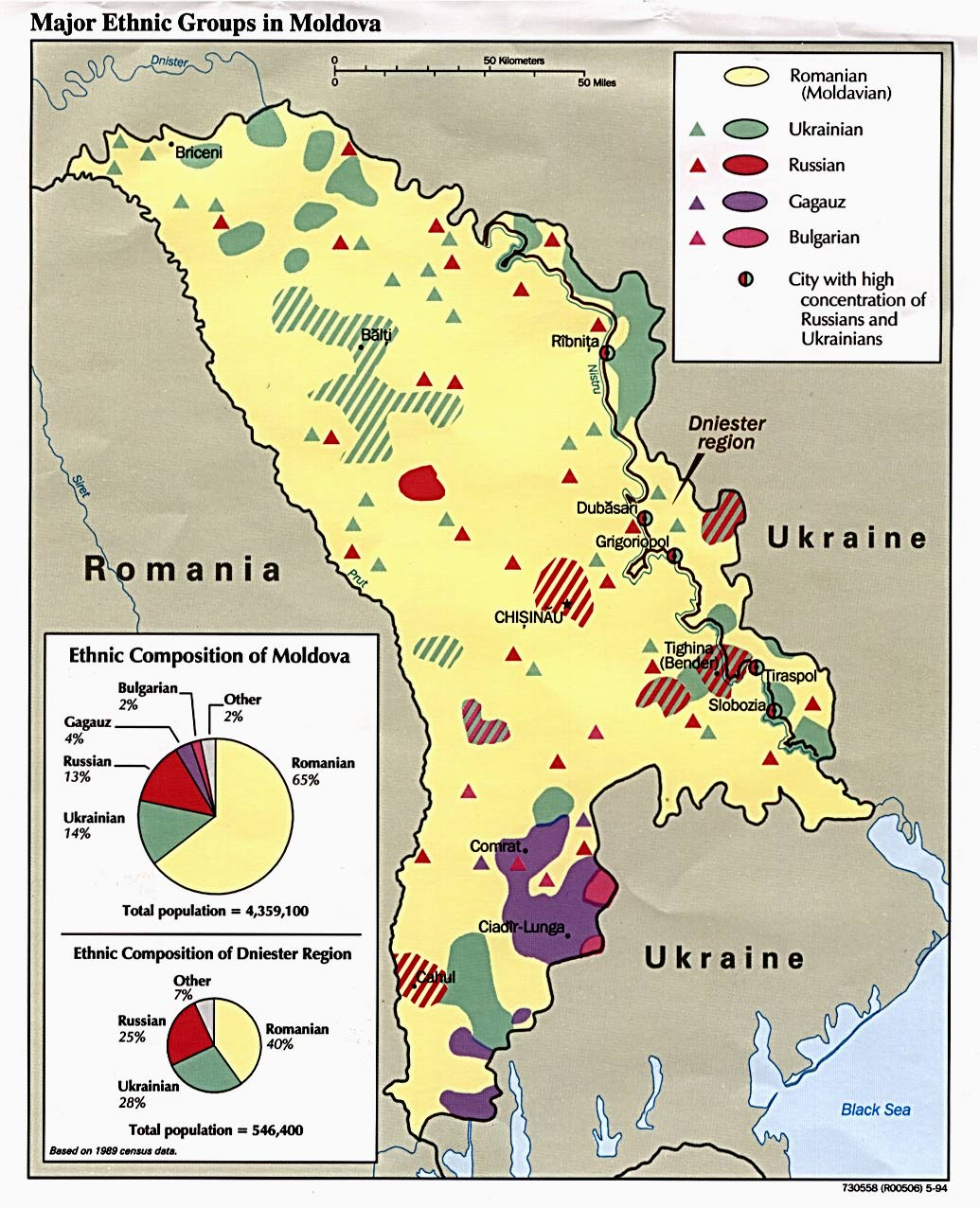
Ethnic map of Moldova Soviet Socialist Republic (1989). Transnistria is in the northeastern section of the map.

Evolution of the population and the ethnic composition of the Moldavian SSR, 1940–1989
ethnic group	1941		1959		1970		1979		1989	
Moldovans	1,622,463	68.86%	1,888,147	66%	2,305,573	65.2%	2,528,164	64.5%	2,794,749	65.1%
Ukrainians	261 200	11.1%	420,820	14.6%	506,560	14.2%	560,679	14.2%	600,366	13.8%
Russians	158,100	6.7%	292,930	10.2%	414,444	11.6%	505,730	12.8%	562,069	13.0%
Jews	–	–	95,107	3.2%	98,072	2.7%	80,127	2.0%	65,672	1.5%
Gagauz	115,700	4.9%	95,856	3.3%	124,902	3.5%	138,000	3.5%	153,458	3.5%
Bulgarians	177,700	7.5%	61,652	2.1%	73,776	2.1%	80,665	2.0%	88,419	2.0%
Gypsy	–	–	7,265	0.2%	9,235	0.2%	10,666	0.3%	11,571	0.3%
others	23,200	1.0%	22,618	0.8%	43,768	1.1%	48,202	1.2%	56,579	1.3%
Total	2,356,700		2,884,477		3,568,873		3,949,756		4,335,360	

Note: "−" means the official census data does not identify that group in that year, i.e. counts it within other groups, not that the group is not present.

In the years of the latter half of the 20th century, the ethnic proportions have changed in large measure due to industrialization and the immigration of Russian and Ukrainian workers. During the Soviet rule, up to one million people settled in Moldova.

In Transnistria, the trend continued after 1991, too, and the Moldovan population in decreased between 1989 and 2004 from 39% to 32% of the total population.

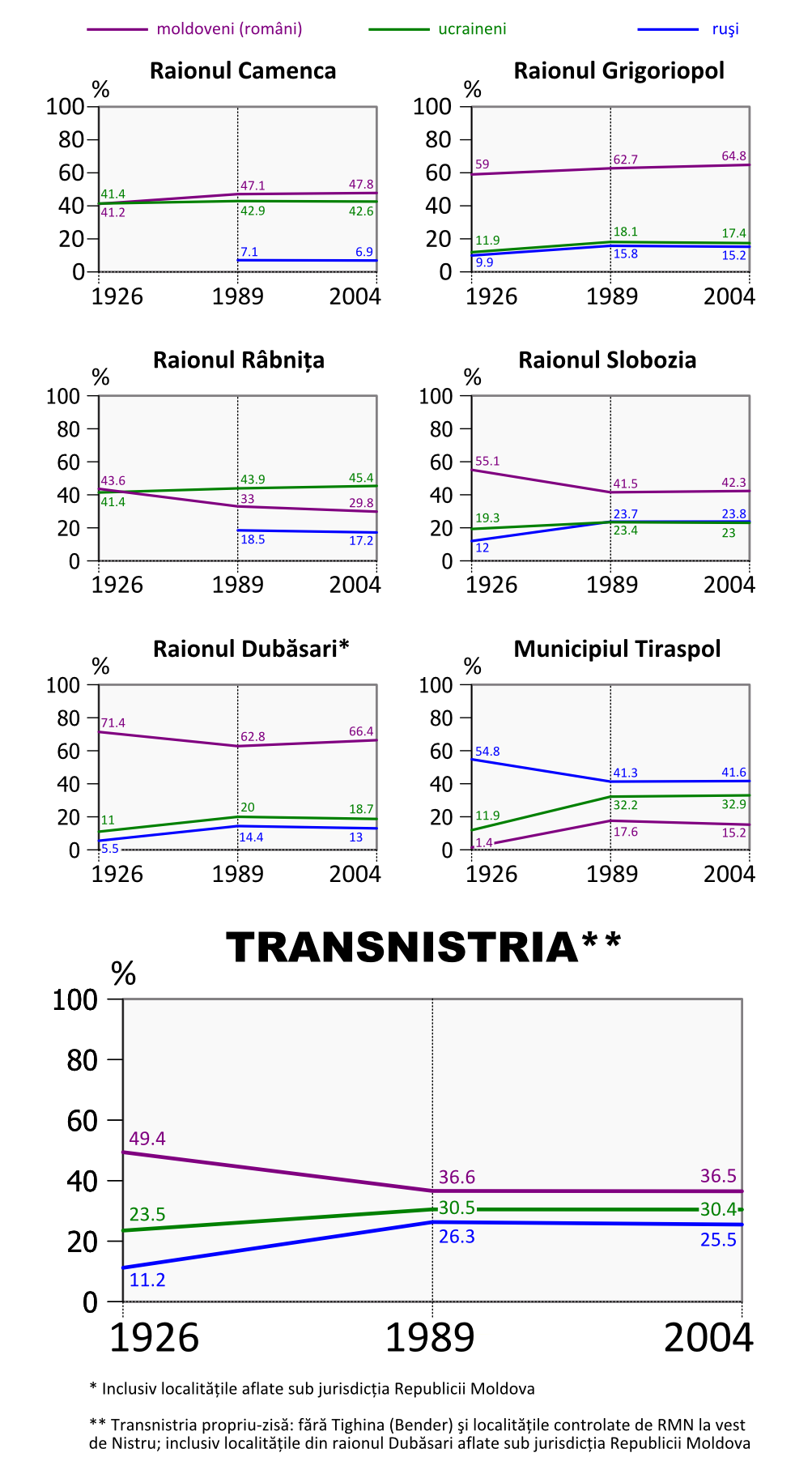
Demographic evolution in Transnistria

Evolution of the ethnic composition of Transnistria, 1926–2015
Ethnicity	1926 census	1936 census	1989 census	2004 census	2015 census
Moldovans	44.1%	41.8%	39.9%	31.9%	33.2%
Ukrainians	27.2%	28.7%	28.3%	28.8%	26.7%
Russians	13.7%	14.2%	25.5%	30.3%	33.8%
Jews	8.2%	7.9%	6.4%		
Bulgarians	6.8%	7.4%	6.4%	2.5%	2.8%
Poles	6.8%	7.4%	6.4%	2%	0.2%
Gagauz:	6.8%	7.4%	6.4%	0.7%	1.2%
Belarusians	6.8%	7.4%	6.4%	0.7%	0.6%
Germans	6.8%	7.4%	6.4%	0.4%	0.3%
Others	4.6%	7.4%	6.4%	2.6%	1.2%

In 2004, the Moldovans were still the most numerous ethnic group, representing an overall majority in the two districts in the central Transnistria (Dubăsari District, 50.15%, and Grigoriopol District, 64.83%), a 47.82% relative majority in the northern Camenca District, and a 41.52% relative majority in the southern (Slobozia District). In Rîbnița District they are a 29.90% minority, and in the city of Tiraspol, they constitute a 15.24% minority of the population.

Russians were the second numerous ethnic group, representing a 41.64% relative majority in the city of Tiraspol, a 24.07% minority in Slobozia, a 19.03% minority in Dubăsari, a 17.22% minority in Râbniţa, a 15.28% minority in Grigoriopol, and a 6.89% minority in Camenca.

Ukrainians are the third numerous ethnic group, representing a 45.41% relative majority in the northern Rîbnița District, a 42.55% minority in Camenca, a 32.97% minority in Tiraspol, a 28.29% minority in Dubăsari, a 23.42% minority in Slobozia, and a 17.36% minority in Grigoriopol.

As of 2015, the Moldovans are no longer the largest single group of the Transnistria region (being surpassed by the Russians). According to the last census in Transnistria (October 2015), the population of the region was 475,373, a 14.47% decrease from the figure recorded at the 2004 census. By ethnic composition, the population of Transnistria was distributed as follows: Russians – 29.1%, Moldovans – 28.6%, Ukrainians – 22.9%, Bulgarians – 2.4%, Gagauzians – 1.1%, Belarusians – 0.5%, Transnistrian – 0.2%, other nationalities – 1.4%. About 14% of the population did not declare their nationality. Also, for the first time, the population had the option to identify as "Transnistrian".

According to the Moldovan Institute for Development and Social Initiative (IDIS) Viitorul, 306,000 people lived in Transnistria in 2021 compared to 731,000 thirty years earlier. This represented a population loss greater than the rest of Moldova.

== See also ==
- 1989 Transnistrian census
- 2004 Transnistrian census
- 2015 Transnistrian census
- History of Transnistria
- Demographics of Moldova
