= 1989 Transnistrian census =

1989 census held in Transnistria

- 1989
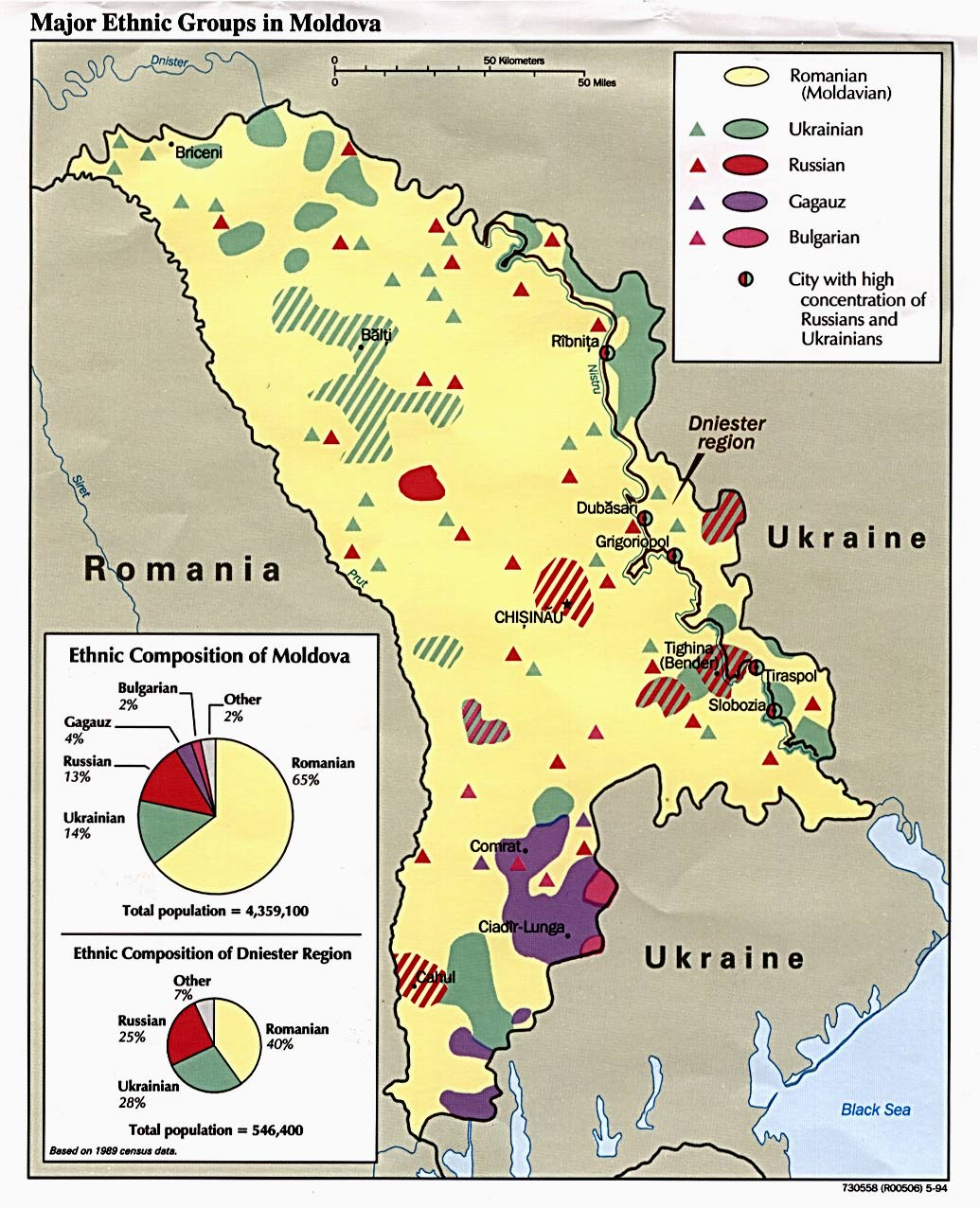
- Distribution of the major ethnic groups in the Moldavian SSR in 1989

General information
- Country: Transnistria (internationally recognized as part of Moldova)

The 1989 Transnistrian census was organized by the authorities of the MSSR in the final days of its existence as a Soviet republic. It took place as part of the Soviet Census of 1989.

Results from the 1989 census showed that among the population of Transnistria, approximately 40% were ethnic Moldovans, 28% Ukrainians and 25% Russians.

== Census results ==
- Total population on the left bank of the Dniester river (minus Tighina): 546,400
- Total population in raions mostly on the left bank of the Dniester river (minus Tighina): 601,660
- (note that percentages below are given from the second figure)
- Moldovans: 39.9%
- Ukrainians: 28.3%
- Russians: 25.5%
- Others: 6.4%

== See also ==
- 2004 Transnistrian census
- 2015 Transnistrian census
- Demographic history of Transnistria
