= 2015 Transnistrian census =

2015 census held in Transnistria

← 2004	2015

General information
- Country: Transnistria (internationally recognized as part of Moldova)

The 2015 Transnistrian census was organized in the unrecognized state of Transnistria in 2015. It was held after Moldova, internationally recognized as the owner of the state's territory, made a census in 2014.

== Census results ==
According to the census results, Transnistria's population was of 475,373 people in 2015. This represented a population decline of 14.47% (or nearly 80,000 people) since the 2004 Transnistrian census, which is an amount similar to the population of the second largest Transnistrian-controlled city, Bender (Tighina).

The ethnic composition results were the following:

- Russians: 29.1%
- Moldovans: 28.6%
- Ukrainians: 22.9%
- Bulgarians: 2.4%
- Gagauz: 1.1%
- Belarusians: 0.5%
- Transnistrians: 0.2%
- Others: 1.4%

This census was the first one in Transnistria in which the population was given the option to identify as "Transnistrian", which more than 1,000 people did. Furthermore, 14% of the population did not specify its ethnic affiliation.

== See also ==
- 1989 Transnistrian census
- 2004 Transnistrian census
- Demographic history of Transnistria
- 2014 Moldovan census
