= Tiraspoltransgaz =

The headquarters of Tiraspoltransgaz in Tiraspol

Tiraspoltransgaz-Pridnestrovie (Russian: Тираспольтрансгаз – Приднестровье, also referred as Tiraspoltransgaz or Tiraspoltransgas) is the largest gas supplier in Transnistria, with headquarters in Tiraspol. It was established in 1993.

The majority shares of Tiraspoltransgaz is probably controlled by Russia's Gazprom, although Gazprom has not confirmed the ownership officially.

Tiraspoltransgaz handles an annual traffic of 23 to 24 billion cubic meters of Russian gas via Transnistria. This is sent to both the rest of Moldova and further west, to other countries in Europe. In addition, Transnistria itself consumes 1.2 to 1.3 billion cubic meters a year.
