= 2004 Transnistrian census =

2004 census held in Transnistria

- 2004

General information
- Country: Transnistria (internationally recognized as part of Moldova)

The 2004 Transnistrian census was organized in Transnistria at roughly the same time that Moldova held its own census, which Transnistria refused to participate in out of principle and deference to its September 2, 1990 declaration of independence.

== Census results ==
Total population (including Bender): 555,347 (percentages below refer to this first figure)

Total population (excluding Bender): 450,337

- Moldovans: 31.9%
- Russians: 30.3%
- Ukrainians: 28.8%
- Bulgarians: 2%
- Poles: 2%
- Gagauz: 1.5%
- Jews: 1.3%
- Belarusians: 1%
- Germans: 0.6%
- Others: 0.5%

Preliminary data, as shown here, was released forty days after the completion of the census. Final and more detailed results were released with a delay of nearly two years.

Compared with the 1989 census, the population decreased by 18% due to war, natural decrease and economically motivated emigration.

In terms of religion, approximately 90% of Transnistria's population identified as Christian Orthodox. 6% chose not to respond, and 4% listed other religions (Catholic, Jewish, etc).

Those residents who hold citizenship of Transnistria chose to identify themselves as citizens of Transnistria numbered 508,600 people (more than 90,0% of the permanent population of the republic). Meanwhile, 107,600 thousand people (19,4%) listed themselves as citizens of the Republic of Moldova, while 56,000 people (10,1%) claimed citizenship of the Russian Federation and 44,400 people (8,0%) citizenship of Ukraine.

The cost of the census was estimated US $550 thousand.

== See also ==
- 1989 Transnistrian census
- 2015 Transnistrian census
- Demographic history of Transnistria
- 2004 Moldovan census
