= Transnistria =

Unrecognized state in Eastern Europe

Pridnestrovian Moldavian Republic
Official names
- - Russian: Приднестровская Молдавская Республика
  - Moldovan (Romanian): (Note: Moldovan is the official name used in Transnistria for the Romanian language. It is written in the Moldovan Cyrillic alphabet, as opposed to the Latin alphabet used in the rest of Moldova. See #Toponymy and terminology for more information.): Република Молдовеняскэ Нистрянэ (Republica Moldovenească Nistreană)
  - Ukrainian: Придністровська Молдавська Республіка
- Flag (Note: The flag of Russia shares equal legal status with the state flag of Transnistria.) Emblem
- Anthem: Государственный гимн Приднестровской Молдавской Республики (Russian) "State Anthem of the Pridnestrovian Moldavian Republic"
- Location of the Transnistria (red) – in Europe (white & gray) – in Moldova (white) – [Legend]
- Status: Unrecognised state
- Capital and largest city: Tiraspol; 46°50′12″N 29°38′24″E
- Official languages: Russian; Moldovan (Romanian); Ukrainian
- Interethnic language: Russian
- Ethnic groups (2015): 29.1% Russians; 28.6% Moldovans/Romanians (Note: There is an ethnolinguistic controversy whether Moldovans are the same as Romanians or a distinct ethnic group.); 22.9% Ukrainians; 2.4% Bulgarians; 1.1% Gagauz; 0.5% Belarusians; 0.2% Transnistrians; 1.4% others; (14% did not specify)
- Demonym: Transnistrian
- Government: Unitary semi-presidential republic
  - President: Vadim Krasnoselsky
  - Prime Minister: Aleksandr Rozenberg
  - Speaker of the Supreme Council: Tatyana Zalevskaya
- Legislature: Supreme Council

Establishment
  - Independence from Moldavian SSR declared: 2 September 1990
  - Independence from Soviet Union declared: 25 August 1991
  - Succeeds the Pridnestrovian Moldavian Soviet Socialist Republic: 5 November 1991
  - Transnistria War: 2 March – 1 July 1992

Area
  - Total: 4,163 km^{2} (1,607 sq mi)

Population
  - March 2024 estimate: ▲367,776 (Moldovan estimate)
  - 2015 census: ▼475,373
  - Density: 73.5/km^{2} (190.4/sq mi)
- GDP (nominal): 2021 estimate
  - Total: €1.0 billion (4th)
  - Per capita: €2,200
- Currency: Transnistrian ruble
- Time zone: UTC+2 (EET)
  - Summer (DST): UTC+3 (EEST)
- Calling code: +373 (Note: +373 5 and +373 2.)

Transnistria, officially known as the Pridnestrovian Moldavian Republic (PMR) and locally as Pridnestrovie, (Note: For other names, see #Toponymy and terminology.) is a landlocked breakaway state internationally recognised as part of Moldova. Transnistria controls most of the narrow strip of land between the Dniester river and the Moldova–Ukraine border, as well as some land on the other side of the river's bank. Its capital and largest city is Tiraspol. Transnistria is officially designated by the Republic of Moldova as the Administrative-Territorial Units of the Left Bank of the Dniester (Romanian: Unitățile Administrativ-Teritoriale din stînga Nistrului) or as Stînga Nistrului ("Left (Bank) of the Dniester").

The region's origins can be traced to the Moldavian Autonomous Soviet Socialist Republic (MASSR), which was formed in 1924 within the Ukrainian SSR. During World War II, the Soviet Union took parts of the MASSR, which was dissolved, and of the Kingdom of Romania's Bessarabia to form the Moldavian Soviet Socialist Republic in 1940. In 1990, during the dissolution of the Soviet Union, the Pridnestrovian Moldavian Soviet Socialist Republic was established in hopes that it would remain within the Soviet Union should Moldova seek unification with Romania or independence, the latter occurring in August 1991. Shortly afterwards, a military conflict between the two parties started in March 1992 and concluded with a ceasefire in July that year.

As a part of the ceasefire agreement, a three-party (Moldova, Russia, and Transnistria) Joint Control Commission and a trilateral peacekeeping force subordinated to the commission were created to deal with ceasefire violations. Although the ceasefire has held, the territory's political status remains unresolved: Transnistria is an unrecognized but de facto independent semi-presidential republic with its own government, parliament, military, police, postal system, currency, and vehicle registration. Its authorities have adopted a constitution, flag, national anthem, and coat of arms. After a 2005 agreement between Moldova and Ukraine, all Transnistrian companies seeking to export goods through the Ukrainian border must be registered with the Moldovan authorities. This agreement was implemented after the European Union Border Assistance Mission to Moldova and Ukraine (EUBAM) took force in 2005. In addition to the unrecognised Transnistrian citizenship, most Transnistrians have Moldovan citizenship, but many also have Russian, Romanian, or Ukrainian citizenship. The main ethnic groups are Russians, Moldovans (Romanians), and Ukrainians.

Transnistria, along with Abkhazia and South Ossetia, is a post-Soviet "frozen conflict" zone. These three partially recognised or unrecognised states maintain friendly relations with each other and form the Community for Democracy and Rights of Nations.

In March 2022, the Parliamentary Assembly of the Council of Europe adopted a resolution that defines the territory as under military occupation by Russia.

== Toponymy and terminology ==
The region can also be referred to in English as Dniesteria, Trans-Dniester, Transdniester or Transdniestria. These names are adaptations of the Romanian colloquial name of the region, Transnistria, meaning "beyond the Dniester". The term Transnistria was used in relation to eastern Moldova for the first time in the year 1989, in the election slogan of Leonida Lari, the deputy and member of the Popular Front of Moldova formed during the reforms of the last Soviet leader Mikhail Gorbachev, when she stated:

I will throw out the invaders, aliens and mankurt over the Dniester, I will throw them out of Transnistria, and you, the Romanians, are the real owners of this long-suffering land ... We will make them speak Romanian, respect our language, our culture!

The documents of the government of Moldova refer to the region as Stînga Nistrului, meaning "Left (Bank) of the Dniester", or in full, Unitățile Administrativ-Teritoriale din Stînga Nistrului ("Administrative-territorial unit(s) of the Left Bank of the Dniester").

According to the Transnistrian authorities and their constitution, the name of the state is the "Pridnestrovian Moldavian Republic" (Russian: Приднестровская Молдавская Республика; Moldovan Cyrillic: Република Молдовеняскэ Нистрянэ, Romanian Latin: Republica Moldovenească Nistreană; Ukrainian: Придністровська Молдавська Республіка). However, the name "Pridnestrovian Moldovan Republic" in English is occasionally used interchangeably with the aforementioned official name. Likewise, the term "Moldovan language" is also sometimes used interchangeably with "Moldavian language", despite "Moldavian" being the name it is called by in the constitution.

According to the Transnistrian authorities, the short name of the state is Pridnestrovie (Russian: Приднестровье; Romanian: Nistrenia, Moldovan Cyrillic: Нистрения; Ukrainian: Придністров'я), meaning "[land] by the Dniester".

The Supreme Council passed a law on 4 September 2024 which banned the use of the term Transnistria within the region, imposing a fine of 360 rubles or up to 15 days imprisonment for using the name in public.

== History ==
=== Soviet and Romanian administration ===
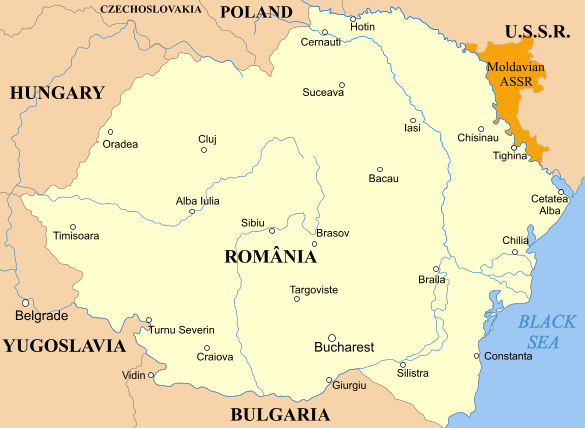
Moldavian ASSR (orange) and Romania, 1924–1940

In 1924, the Moldavian ASSR was proclaimed within the Ukrainian SSR. The ASSR included today's Transnistria (4,100 km^{2}; 1,600 sq mi) and an area (4,200 km^{2}; 1,600 sq mi) to the northeast around the city of Balta, but nothing from Bessarabia, which at the time formed part of the Kingdom of Romania. One of the reasons for the creation of the Moldavian ASSR was the desire of the Soviet Union at the time to eventually incorporate Bessarabia. On 28 June 1940, the USSR annexed Bessarabia and Northern Bukovina from Romania under the terms of the Molotov–Ribbentrop Pact, and on 2 August 1940 the Supreme Soviet of the USSR created the Moldavian SSR by combining part of the annexed territory with part of the former Moldavian ASSR roughly equivalent to present-day Transnistria.

In 1941, after Axis forces invaded the Soviet Union in the Second World War, they defeated the Soviet troops in the region and occupied it. Romania controlled the entire region between Dniester and Southern Bug rivers, including the city of Odesa as local capital. The Romanian-administered territory, known as the Transnistria Governorate, with an area of 39,733 km^{2} (15,341 sq mi) and a population of 2.3 million inhabitants, was divided into 13 counties: Ananiev, Balta, Berzovca, Dubasari, Golta, Jugastru, Movilau, Oceacov, Odessa, Ovidiopol, Rîbnița, Tiraspol, and Tulcin. This expanded Transnistria was home to nearly 200,000 Romanian-speaking residents. The Romanian administration of Transnistria attempted to stabilise the situation in the area under Romanian control, implementing a process of Romanianisation. During the Romanian occupation of 1941–44, between 150,000 and 250,000 Ukrainian and Romanian Jews and 25,000 Romanian Roma were deported to Transnistria; the majority were murdered or died from other causes in the ghettos and concentration camps of the Governorate.

After the Red Army advanced into the area in 1944, Soviet authorities executed, exiled, or imprisoned hundreds of inhabitants of the Moldavian SSR in the following months on charges of collaboration with the Romanian occupiers. A later campaign directed against rich peasant families deported them to the Kazakh SSR and Siberia. Over the course of two days, 6–7 July 1949, a plan named "Operation South" saw the deportation of over 11,342 families by order of the Moldavian Minister of State Security, Iosif Mordovets.

=== Secession ===
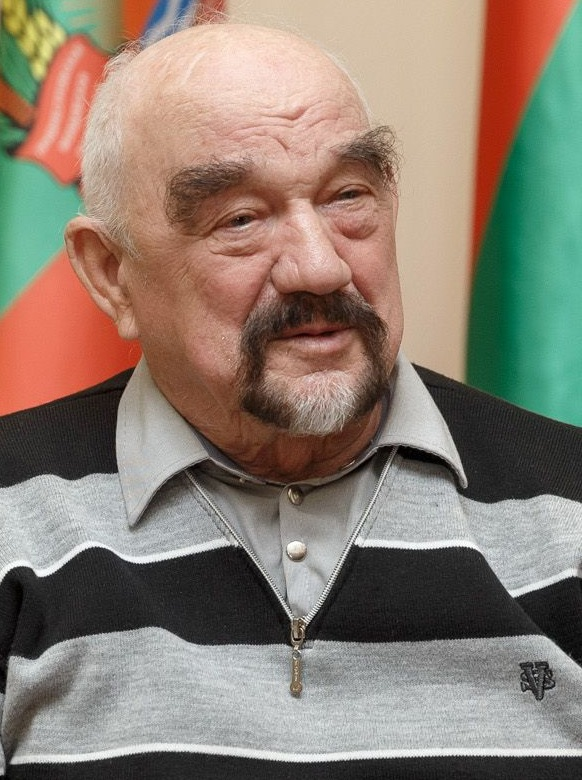
Igor Smirnov, first president of Transnistria from 1991 to 2011

In the 1980s, Mikhail Gorbachev's policies of perestroika and glasnost in the Soviet Union allowed political liberalisation at a regional level. This led to the creation of various informal movements all over the country, and to a rise of nationalism within most Soviet republics. In the Moldavian SSR in particular, there was a significant resurgence of pro-Romanian nationalism among Moldovans. The most prominent of these movements was the Popular Front of Moldova (PFM). In early 1988, the PFM demanded that the Soviet authorities declare Moldovan the only state language, return to the use of the Latin alphabet, and recognise the shared ethnic identity of Moldovans and Romanians. The more radical factions of the PFM espoused extreme anti-minority, ethnocentric and chauvinist positions, calling for minority populations, particularly the Slavs (mainly Russians and Ukrainians) and Gagauz, to leave or be expelled from Moldova.

On 31 August 1989, the Supreme Soviet of the Moldavian SSR adopted Moldovan as the official language with Russian retained only for secondary purposes, returned Moldovan to the Latin alphabet, and declared a shared Moldovan-Romanian linguistic identity. As plans for major cultural changes in Moldova were made public, tensions rose further. Ethnic minorities felt threatened by the prospects of removing Russian as the official language, which served as the medium of interethnic communication, and by the possible future reunification of Moldova and Romania, as well as the ethnocentric rhetoric of the PFM. The Yedinstvo (Unity) Movement, established by the Slavic population of Moldova, pressed for equal status for both the Russian and Moldovan languages. Transnistria's ethnic and linguistic composition differed significantly from most of the rest of Moldova. The proportion of ethnic Russians and Ukrainians was especially high and an overall majority of the population, some of them Moldovans, spoke Russian as their mother tongue.

The nationalist PFM won the first free parliamentary elections in the Moldavian SSR in early 1990, and its agenda started slowly to be implemented. On 2 September 1990, the Pridnestrovian Moldavian Soviet Socialist Republic (PMSSR) was proclaimed as a Soviet republic by an ad hoc assembly, the Second Congress of the Peoples' Representatives of Transnistria, following a successful referendum. Violence escalated when in October 1990 the PFM called for volunteers to form armed militias to stop an autonomy referendum in Gagauzia, which had an even higher proportion of ethnic minorities. In response, volunteer militias were formed in Transnistria. In April 1990, nationalist mobs attacked ethnic Russian members of parliament, while the Moldovan police refused to intervene or restore order.

In the interest of preserving a unified Moldavian SSR within the USSR and preventing the situation escalating further, then Soviet President Mikhail Gorbachev, while citing the restriction of civil rights of ethnic minorities by Moldova as the cause of the dispute, declared the Transnistria proclamation to be devoid of a legal basis and annulled it by presidential decree on 22 December 1990. Nevertheless, no significant action was taken against Transnistria and the new authorities were slowly able to establish control of the region.

Following the 1991 Soviet coup d'état attempt, the Pridnestrovian Moldavian SSR declared its independence from the Soviet Union, renaming itself as the "Pridnestrovian Moldavian Republic" on 5 November 1991.

=== Transnistria War ===
The Transnistria War followed armed clashes on a limited scale that broke out between Transnistrian separatists and Moldova as early as November 1990 at Dubăsari. Volunteers, including Cossacks, came from Russia to help the separatist side. In mid-April 1992, under the agreements on the split of the military equipment of the former Soviet Union negotiated between the former 15 republics in the previous months, Moldova created its own Defence Ministry. According to the decree of its creation, most of the 14th Guards Army's military equipment was to be retained by Moldova. Starting from 2 March 1992, there was concerted military action between Moldova and Transnistria. The fighting intensified throughout early 1992. The former Soviet 14th Guards Army entered the conflict in its final stage, opening fire against Moldovan forces; approximately 700 people were killed. Moldova has since then exercised no effective control or influence on Transnistrian authorities. A ceasefire agreement, signed on 21 July 1992, has held to the present day.

=== Post-war period ===
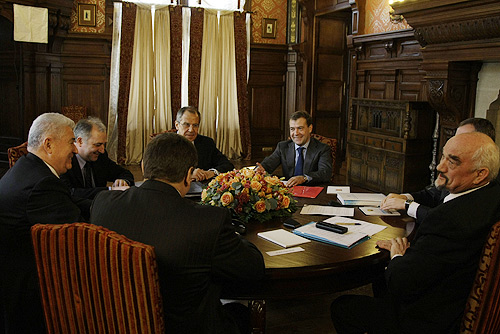
Igor Smirnov with Vladimir Voronin and Dmitry Medvedev in Barvikha, 18 March 2009

The Organization for Security and Co-operation in Europe (OSCE) is trying to facilitate a negotiated settlement. Under OSCE auspices, on 8 May 1997, Moldovan President Petru Lucinschi and Transnistrian President Igor Smirnov, signed the "Memorandum on the principles of normalisation of relations between the Republic of Moldova and Transnistria", also known as the "Primakov Memorandum", sustaining the establishment of legal and state relations, although the memorandum's provisions were interpreted differently by the two governments.

In November 2003, Dmitry Kozak, a counselor of Russian president Vladimir Putin, proposed a memorandum on the creation of an asymmetric federal Moldovan state, with Moldova holding a majority and Transnistria being a minority part of the federation. Known as "the Kozak memorandum", it did not coincide with the Transnistrian position, which sought equal status between Transnistria and Moldova, but gave Transnistria veto powers over future constitutional changes, thus encouraging Transnistria to sign it. Moldovan President Vladimir Voronin was initially supportive of the plan, but refused to sign it after internal opposition and international pressure from the OSCE and US, and after Russia had endorsed the Transnistrian demand to maintain a Russian military presence for the next 20 years as a guarantee for the intended federation.

The 5+2 format (or 5+2 talks, comprising Transnistria, Moldova, Ukraine, Russia and the OSCE, plus the United States and the EU as external observers) for negotiation was started in 2005 to deal with the problems, but without results for a number of years as it was suspended. In February 2011, talks were resumed in Vienna, continuing through to 2018 with some minor agreements being reached. Moldova had, by 2023, dropped the term 5+2 in diplomatic discussions.

After the annexation of Crimea by the Russian Federation in March 2014, Transnistrian officials requested that Russia extend its territorial integration legislation to include their region.

After the start of the Russian invasion of Ukraine in 2022, Ukraine sealed its border with Transnistria, which had been the primary route for goods to enter the region. As such, Transnistria is wholly reliant on Moldova to allow imports through its own border. Transnistrian politicians have grown increasingly anxious about the situation, and, in 2024, the Supreme Council was convened, with the council requesting economic assistance from Russia and called for help from OSCE and the European Parliament, stating that Moldova was "destroying" the economy of Transnistria and "violating human rights and freedoms in Transnistria." Transnistria's request for "protection" from Russia alongside some calls for a referendum has led to suggestions that Russia may attempt to "annex" the region, as they did with occupied Ukraine in 2022.

On 1 January 2025, an agreement under which Russian gas was delivered via Ukraine ended, halting the flow of Russian gas to Transnistria, and creating a severe energy crisis. Limited gas supplies resumed in February 2025 through Moldova, but at levels too low to sustain the region's heavy industry; later that year, economy contracted by about 18% and its industrial output fell by more than 30%. Moldova is planned to begin phasing in VAT and excise duties on goods imported into the region in 2027, aiming to remove all tax exemptions for Transnistrian businesses by 2030. Talks between the two sides' political representatives resumed in February 2026 but made no progress, and in May 2026 Russia simplified access to Russian citizenship for the region's residents. A presidential election is scheduled for 13 December 2026, in which Vadim Krasnoselsky is barred by term limits from running.

== Geography ==
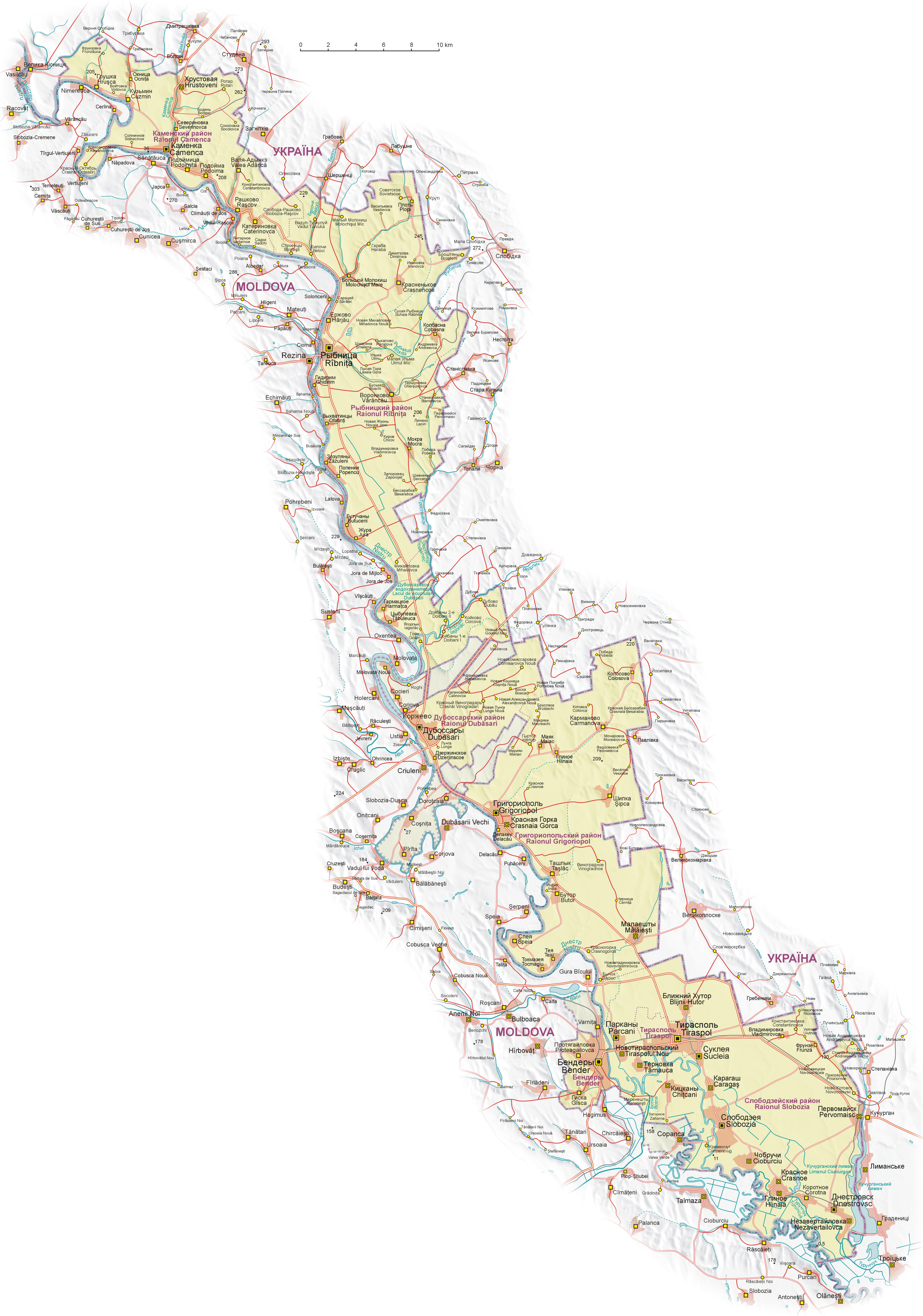
General map of Transnistria

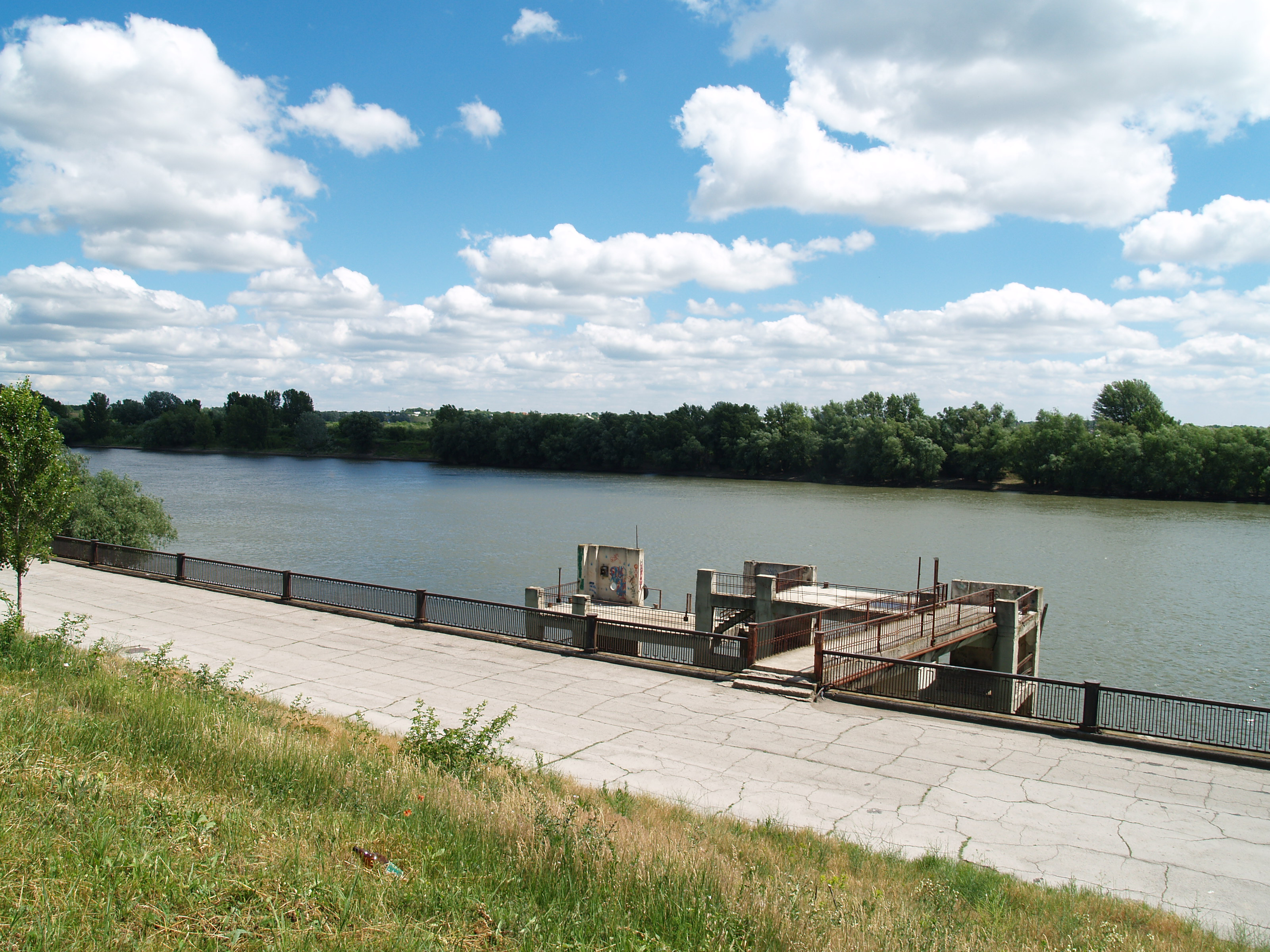
Dniester River in Bender (Tighina)

Transnistria is landlocked and borders Bessarabia (the region the Republic of Moldova is based on, for 411 km; 255 mi) to the west, and Ukraine (for 405 km; 252 mi) to the east. It is a narrow valley stretching north–south along the bank of the Dniester river, which forms a natural boundary along most of the de facto border with Moldova.

The territory controlled by the PMR is mostly, but not completely, conterminous with the left (eastern) bank of Dniester. It includes ten cities and towns, and 69 communes, with a total of 147 localities (including here those unincorporated). Six communes on the left bank (Cocieri, Molovata Nouă, Corjova, Pîrîta, Coșnița, and Doroțcaia) remained under the control of the Moldovan government after the Transnistria War of 1992, as part of the Dubăsari District. They are situated north and south of the city of Dubăsari, which itself is under PMR control. The village of Roghi of Molovata Nouă Commune is also controlled by the PMR (Moldova controls the other nine of the 10 villages of the six communes).

On the west bank, in Bessarabia, the city of Bender (Tighina) and four communes (containing six villages) to its east, south-east, and south, on the opposite bank of the river Dniester from the city of Tiraspol (Proteagailovca, Gîsca, Chițcani, and Cremenciug) are controlled by the PMR.

The localities controlled by Moldova on the eastern bank, the village of Roghi, and the city of Dubăsari (situated on the eastern bank and controlled by the PMR) form a security zone along with the six villages and one city controlled by the PMR on the western bank, as well as two (Varnița and Copanca) on the same west bank under Moldovan control. The security situation inside it is subject to the Joint Control Commission rulings.

The main transportation route in Transnistria is the M4 road from Tiraspol to Rîbnița through Dubăsari. The highway is controlled in its entirety by the PMR. North and south of Dubăsari it passes through land corridors controlled by Moldova in the villages of Doroțcaia, Cocieri, Roghi, and Vasilievca, the latter being located entirely to the east of the road. The road is the de facto border between Moldova and Transnistria in the area. Conflict erupted on several occasions when the PMR prevented the villagers from reaching their farmland east of the road.

Transnistrians are able to travel (normally without difficulty) in and out of the territory under PMR control to neighbouring Moldovan-controlled territory and to Ukraine. International air travellers rely on the airport in the Moldovan capital Chișinău, or the airport in Odesa, in Ukraine.

The climate is humid continental with subtropical characteristics. Transnistria has warm summers and cool to cold winters. Precipitation is unvarying all year round, although with a slight increase in the summer months.

== Government and politics ==
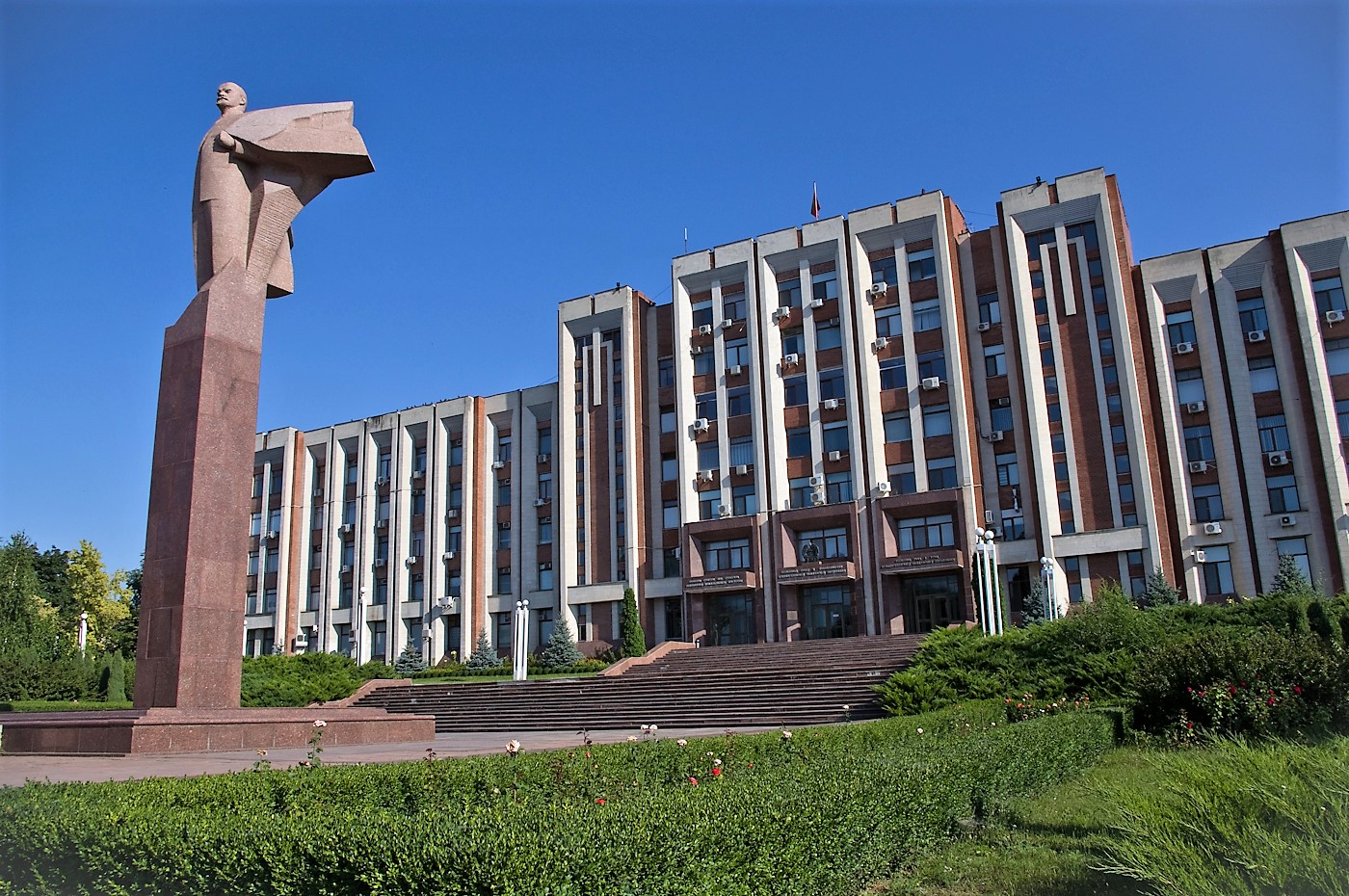
The supreme council building in Tiraspol, fronted by a statue of Vladimir Lenin

Transnistria is a semi-presidential republic with a powerful presidency. The president is directly elected for a maximum of two consecutive five-year terms. The current President is Vadim Krasnoselsky.

The Supreme Council is a unicameral legislature. It has 33 members who are elected for 5-year terms. Elections take place within a multi-party system. The majority in the supreme council belongs to the Renewal movement that defeated the Republic party affiliated with Igor Smirnov in 2005 and performed even better in the 2010 and 2015 elections. Elections in Transnistria are not recognised by international bodies such as the European Union, as well as numerous individual countries, who called them a source of increased tensions.

There is disagreement over whether elections in Transnistria are free and fair. The political regime has been described as one of "super-presidentialism" before the 2011 constitutional reform. During the 2006 presidential election, the registration of opposition candidate Andrey Safonov was delayed until a few days before the vote, so that he had little time to conduct an election campaign. In 2001, in one region it was reported that Igor Smirnov collected 103.6% of the votes. The PMR government said "the government of Moldova launched a campaign aimed at convincing international observers not to attend" an election held on 11 December 2005 – but election monitors from the Russian-led Commonwealth of Independent States ignored that and declared the ballot democratic.

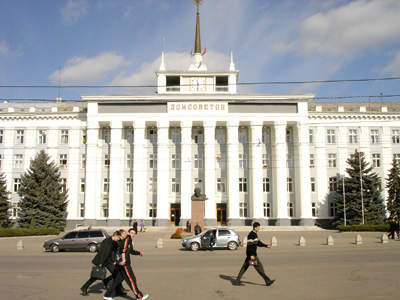
Tiraspol City Council

The opposition Narodovlastie party and Power to the People movement were outlawed at the beginning of 2000 and eventually dissolved.

A list published by the European Union had banned travel to the EU for some members of the Transnistrian leadership. This ban was lifted by 2012.

In 2007, the registration of a Social Democratic Party was allowed. This party, led by a former separatist leader and member of the PMR government Andrey Safonov, allegedly favours a union with Moldova.

In September 2007, the leader of the Transnistrian Communist Party, Oleg Khorzhan, was sentenced to a suspended sentence of 1½ years' imprisonment for organising unsanctioned actions of protest.

According to the 2006 referendum, carried out by the PMR government, 97.2% of the population voted in favour of "independence from Moldova and free association with Russia". EU and several other countries refused to recognise the referendum results.

Residents had the opportunity to vote in Moldova's referendum on joining the EU, in autumn 2024. There were no voting stations within Transnistria; however, residents were free to travel into other areas of Moldova to vote.

=== Administrative divisions ===
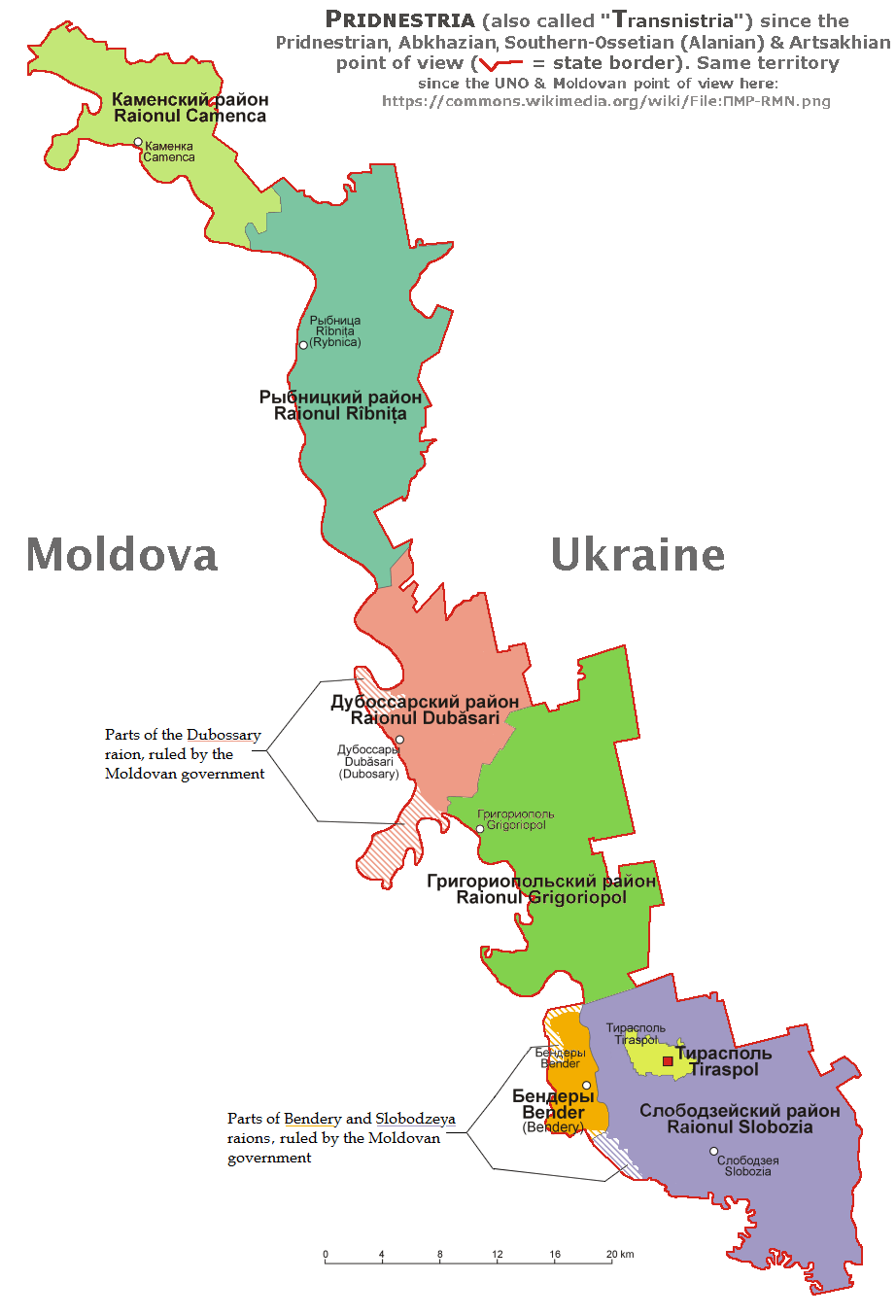
Districts of Transnistria

Transnistria is subdivided into five districts (raions) and one municipality, the city of Tiraspol (which is entirely surrounded by but administratively distinct from Slobozia District), listed below from north to south (Russian names and transliterations are appended in parentheses). In addition, another municipality, the City of Bender, situated on the western bank of the Dniester, in Bessarabia, and geographically outside Transnistria, is not part of the territorial unit of Transnistria as defined by the Moldovan central authorities, but it is controlled by the PMR authorities, which consider it part of PMR's administrative organisation:

Administrative divisions of Transnistria
Name	Capital	Area	Population (2025)	Ethnic composition (2004)
Camenca District (Romanian: Camenca, Moldovan Cyrillic: Каменка)	Camenca	436 square kilometres (168 sq mi)	21,000	47.82% Moldovans, 42.55% Ukrainians, 6.89% Russians, 2.74% others
Rîbnița District (Romanian: Rîbnița, Moldovan Cyrillic: Рыбница)	Rîbnița	850 square kilometres (330 sq mi)	69,000	29.90% Moldovans, 45.41% Ukrainians, 17.22% Russians, 7.47% others
Dubăsari District (Romanian: Dubăsari, Moldovan Cyrillic: Дубэсарь)	Dubăsari	381 square kilometres (147 sq mi)	31,000	50.15% Moldovans, 28.29% Ukrainians, 19.03% Russians, 2.53% others
Grigoriopol District (Romanian: Grigoriopol, Moldovan Cyrillic: Григориопол)	Grigoriopol	822 square kilometres (317 sq mi)	40,000	64.83% Moldovans, 15.28% Ukrainians, 17.36% Russians, 2.26% others
Slobozia District (Romanian: Slobozia, Moldovan Cyrillic: Слобозия)	Slobozia	873 square kilometres (337 sq mi)	84,000	41.51% Moldovans, 21.71% Ukrainians, 26.51% Russians, 10.27% others
City of Tiraspol (Romanian: Tiraspol, Moldovan Cyrillic: Тираспол)	Tiraspol	205 square kilometres (79 sq mi)	126,306	18.41% Moldovans, 32.31% Ukrainians, 41.44% Russians, 7.82% others
City of Bender (Romanian: Tighina, Moldovan Cyrillic: Тигина/Бендер)	Bender	97 square kilometres (37 sq mi)	83,919	25.03% Moldovans, 17.98% Ukrainians, 43.35% Russians, 13.64% others

Each of the districts is further divided into cities and communes.

License plate of Transnistria

=== Transnistria border customs dispute ===
On 3 March 2006, Ukraine introduced new customs regulations on its border with Transnistria. Ukraine declared that it would import goods from Transnistria only with documents processed by Moldovan customs offices as part of the implementation of the joint customs protocol agreed between Ukraine and Moldova on 30 December 2005. Transnistria and Russia termed the act an "economic blockade".

The United States, the European Union, and the OSCE approved the Ukrainian move, while Russia saw it as a means of political pressure. On 4 March, Transnistria responded by blocking the Moldovan and Ukrainian transport at the borders of Transnistria. The Transnistrian block was lifted after two weeks. However, the Moldovan/Ukrainian block remains in place and holds up progress in status settlement negotiations between the sides. In the months after the regulations, exports from Transnistria declined drastically. Transnistria declared a "humanitarian catastrophe" in the region, while Moldova called the declaration "deliberate misinformation". Cargoes of humanitarian aid were sent from Russia in response.

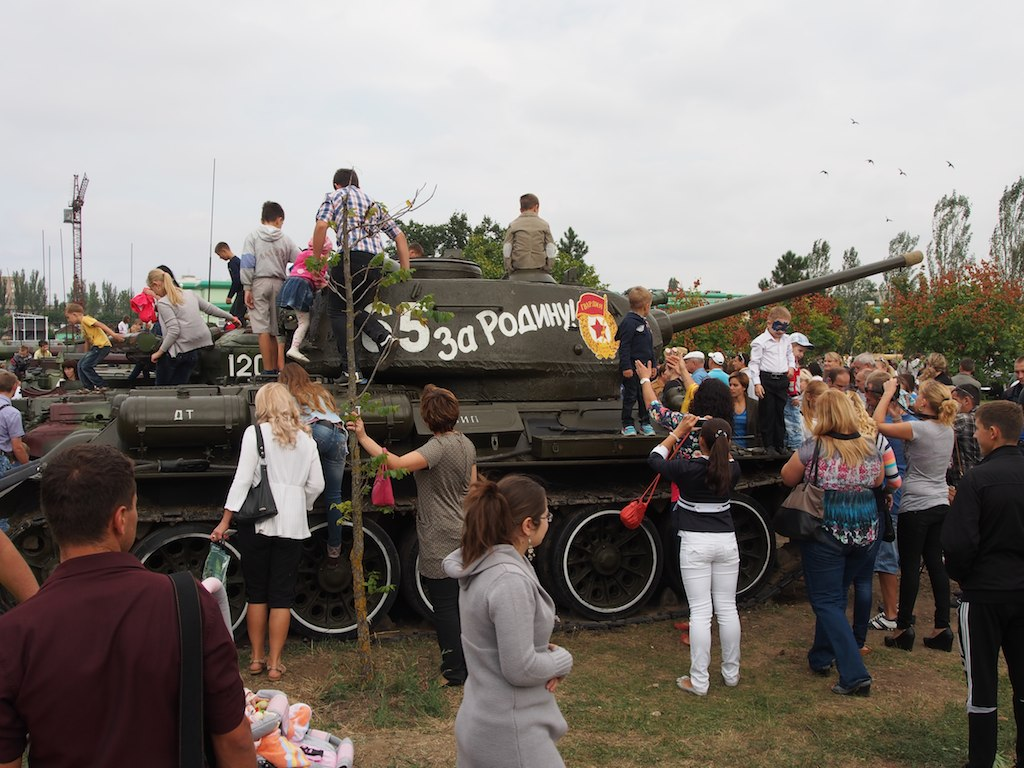
World War II-era Soviet T-34 in Tiraspol

=== Russian military presence in Transnistria ===
The 1992 cease-fire agreement between Moldova and Transnistria established a Russian "peacekeeper" presence in Transnistria and a 1,200-member Russian military contingent is present in Transnistria. Russian troops stationed in parts of Moldova except Transnistria since the time of the USSR were fully withdrawn to Russia by January 1993.

In April 1995, the Soviet 14th Guards Army became the Operational Group of Russian Forces, which by the 2010s had shrunk to two battalions and no more than 1,500 troops.

On 21 October 1994, Russia and Moldova signed an agreement that committed Russia to the withdrawal of the troops within three years of the agreement's effective date; this did not come into effect, however, because the Russian Duma did not ratify it. The Treaty on Conventional Armed Forces in Europe (CFE) included a paragraph about the removal of Russian troops from Moldova's territory and was introduced into the text of the OSCE Summit Declaration of Istanbul (1999) in which Russia had committed itself to pulling out its troops from Transnistria by the end of 2002. However, even after 2002, the Russian parliament did not ratify the Istanbul accords. On 19 July 2004, after it finally passed through parliament President Vladimir Putin signed the Law on the ratification of the CFE Treaty in Europe, which committed Russia to remove the heavy armaments limited by this Treaty. During 2000–2001, although the CFE Treaty was not fully ratified, to comply with it, Moscow withdrew 125 pieces of Treaty Limited Equipment (TLE) and 60 railway wagons containing ammunition from the Transnistrian region of Moldova. In 2002, Russia withdrew three trainloads (118 railway wagons) of military equipment and two (43 wagons) of ammunition from the Transnistrian region of Moldova, and in 2003, 11 rail convoys transporting military equipment and 31 transporting ammunition. According to the OSCE Mission to Moldova, of a total of 42,000 tons of ammunition stored in Transnistria, 1,153 tons (3%) was transported back to Russia in 2001, 2,405 tons (6%) in 2002 and 16,573 tons (39%) in 2003.

Andrei Stratan, the Minister of Foreign Affairs of Moldova, stated in his speech during the 12th OSCE Ministerial Council Meeting in Sofia on 6–7 December 2004 that "The presence of Russian troops on the territory of the Republic of Moldova is against the political will of Moldovan constitutional authorities and defies the unanimously recognised international norms and principles, being qualified by Moldovan authorities as a foreign military occupation illegally deployed on the territory of the state". As of 2007 however, Russia insists that it has already fulfilled those obligations. It states the remaining troops are serving as peacekeepers authorised under the 1992 ceasefire, are not in violation of the Istanbul accords and will remain until the conflict is fully resolved. On the other hand, Moldova believes that fewer than 500 soldiers are authorised pursuant to the ceasefire and, in 2015, began to arrest and deport Russian soldiers who are part of the excess forces and attempt to use Moldovan airports.

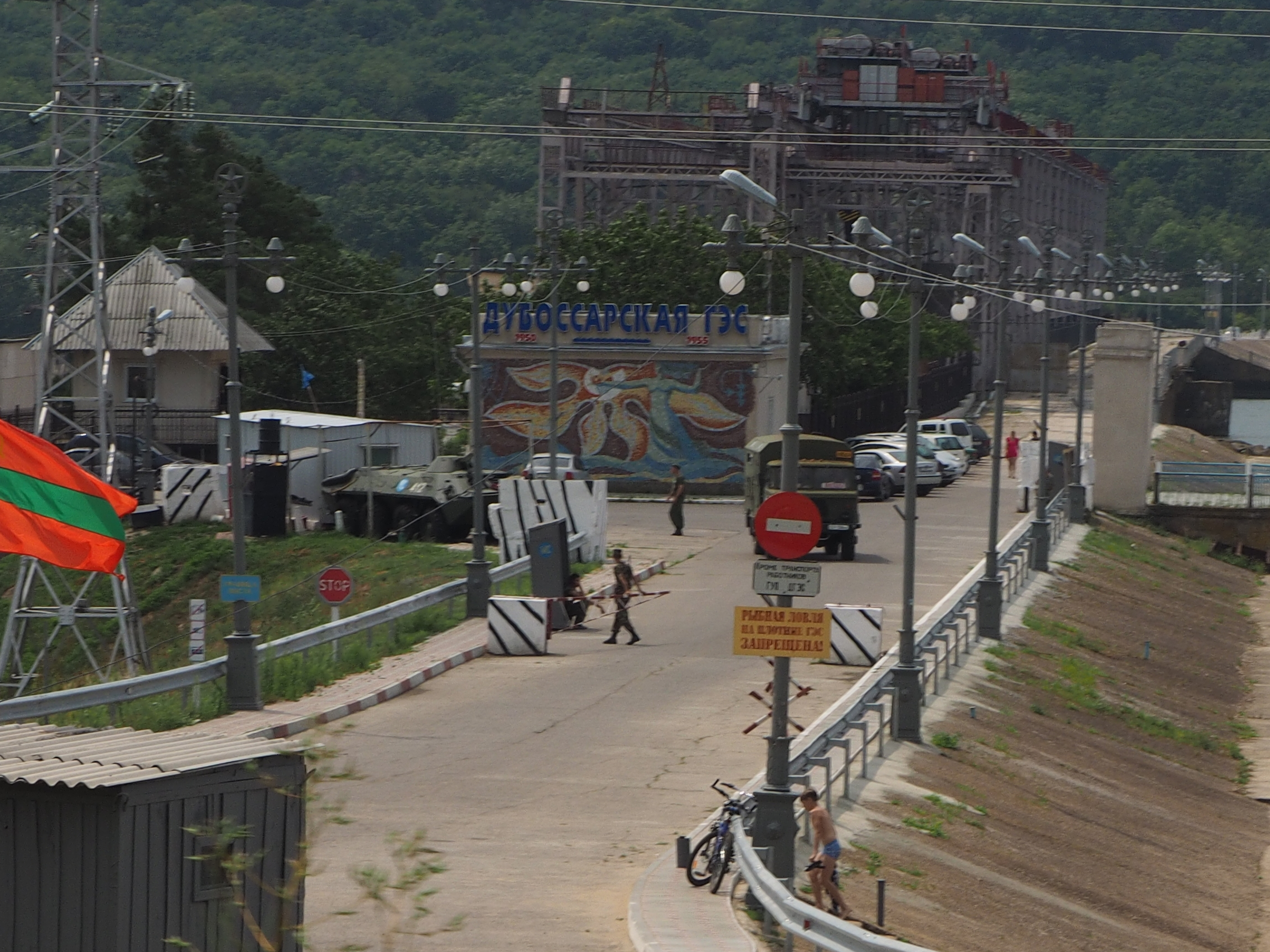
Russian soldiers at the border between Transnistria and Moldova at Dubăsari

In a NATO resolution on 18 November 2008, Russia was urged to withdraw its military presence from the "Transdnestrian region of Moldova".

In 2011, US Senator John McCain claimed in a visit to Moldova that Moscow is violating the territorial integrity of Moldova and Georgia and one of the "fundamental norms" of "international behavior". On 21 May 2015, the Ukrainian parliament passed a law terminating five co-operation agreements with Russia. This law effectively terminates the "Agreement on transit of Russian military units temporarily located on the territory of the Republic of Moldova through the territory of Ukraine" dated 4 December 1998.

One point of access for Russian soldiers travelling to Transnistria remains Chișinău International Airport and the short overland journey from there to Tiraspol. Over the years, Moldova has largely permitted Russian officers and soldiers to transit the airport on their way to Transnistria, though occasionally it blocked those that were not clearly identified as international peacekeepers or who failed to give sufficient advance notice. Chișinău Airport would likely only ever agree to the possibility of moving employees, officers, and soldiers of the stationed forces. The passage of soldiers of the 14th Guards Army would be illegal.

On 27 June 2016, a new law entered in force in Transnistria, punishing actions or public statements, including through the usage of mass media, networks of information and telecommunications or the Internet, criticising the military mission of the Russian Army stationed in Transnistria, or presenting interpretations perceived to be "false" by the Transnistrian government of the Russian Army's military mission. The punishment is up to three years of jail for ordinary people or up to seven years of jail if the crime was committed by a person of responsibility or a group of persons by prior agreement.

==== Russian invasion of Ukraine ====
After the 2022 Russian invasion of Ukraine, Transnistria declared it would maintain its neutrality in the situation and denied claims that it would assist in the attack on Ukraine.

During the prelude to the 2022 Russian invasion of Ukraine, Ukrainian military intelligence stated on 14 January 2022 that they had evidence that the Russian government was covertly planning false flag "provocations" against Russian soldiers stationed in Transnistria, which would be used to justify a Russian invasion of Ukraine. The Russian government denied the claims. In that prelude, similar unattributed clashes happened in Donbas in February 2022: Ukraine denied being involved in those incidents and called them a false flag operation as well.

On 15 March 2022, the Parliamentary Assembly of the Council of Europe passed a bill, initiated by 21 deputees, mostly Romanians, recognizing Transnistria as a Moldovan territory occupied by Russia.

On 14 April 2022, one of Ukraine's deputy defence ministers, Hanna Maliar, stated that Russia was massing its troops along the borders with Transnistria but the Transnistrian authorities denied it. According to the Transnistrian authorities, on 25 April there was an attack on the premises of the Ministry for State Security and on the next day two transmitting antennas broadcasting Russian radio programmes at Grigoriopol transmitter near the Ukrainian border were blown up. The Moldovan authorities called these events a provocation aimed at destabilising the situation in the region. The Russian army has a military base, a large ammunition dump and about 1,500 soldiers stationed in Transnistria, stating that they are there as "peacekeepers".

Since the invasion of Ukraine, Transnistria has lost its economic connections with Ukraine and has had to rely and become more dependent on Moldova and trade links to the EU, resulting in an intensification of dialogue and collaboration, such as the help provided to Ukrainian refugees.

=== Military ===
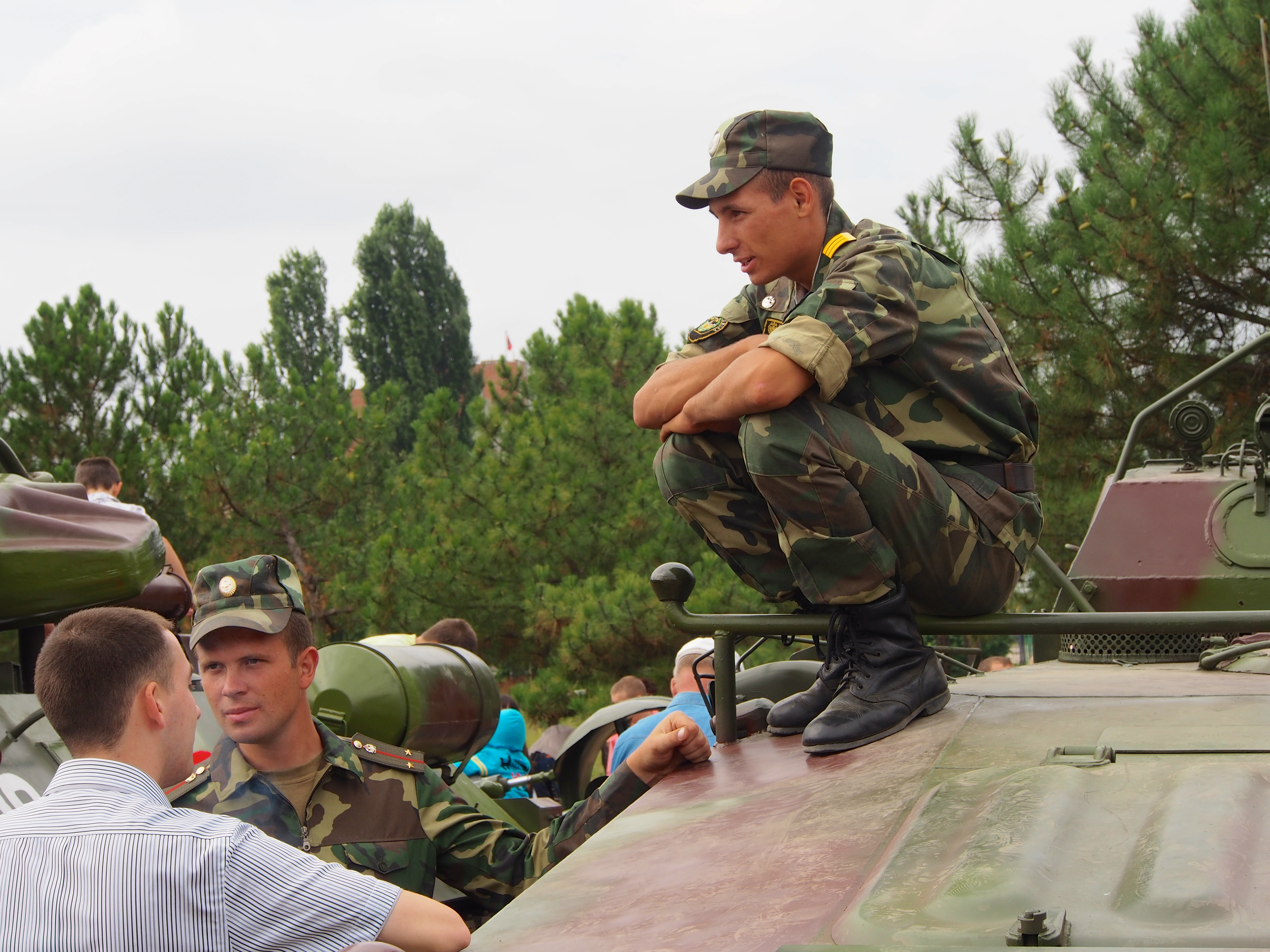
Transnistrian soldiers in 2013

As of 2007, the armed forces and the paramilitary of Transnistria were composed of around 4,500–7,500 soldiers, divided into four motorised infantry brigades in Tiraspol, Bender, Rîbnița, and Dubăsari. They have 18 tanks, 107 armoured personnel carriers, 73 field guns, 46 anti-aircraft installations, and 173 tank destroyer units. The airforce is composed of 1 Mi-8T and 1 Mi-24 helicopters. Previous aircraft operated were Antonov An-26, Antonov An-2, and Yakovlev Yak-52 fixed wing and Mil Mi-2 and other Mi-8T and Mi-24 helicopters.

=== Law ===
The legislation of Transnistria is classified into several areas:

- The Constitution, a codex containing 28 consolidated legislative acts.

This area of legislation concerns the establishment of the Supreme Court, Arbitration Court, the Constitutional Court and the judicial and governmental system of the Pridnestrovian Moldavian Republic. It also concerns the establishment of the statuses of some government officials, such as Judges, Deputies of the Supreme Council and the Prosecutors' Office. It also establishes a commissioner for human rights, special legal regimes, citizenship law, This category also contains amendments to the constitutional order, and its procedure to make alterations to the constitution.

- Laws relating to the foundational law and constitutional system, a codex containing 81 legislative acts.
- Laws relating to the budget, finance, economic and taxation, a codex containing 55 legislative acts.
- Laws relating to the judicial system and its procedures, a codex containing 13 legislative acts.
- Laws relating to criminal, customs and administrative law, a codex containing 12 legislative acts.
- Laws relating to the military and defence sector, a codex containing 16 legislative acts.
- Laws relating to the civil, housing and family Law, a codex containing 28 legislative acts.
- Laws relating to healthcare and social protection, a codex containing 49 legislative acts.
- Laws relating to the field of agriculture and ecology, A codex containing 28 legislative acts.
- Laws relating to industry, trade, privatisation, construction, transport, energy and communications, a codex containing 42 legislative acts.
- Laws relating to education, culture, sports, youth policy, media, and implementation of political rights and freedoms of citizens, a codex containing 43 legislative acts.
- Laws relating to government programmes and government targeted programmes, a codex containing 20 legislative acts.

=== Arms control and disarmament ===
Following the collapse of the former Soviet Union, the Russian 14th Army left 40,000 tons of weaponry and ammunition in Transnistria. In later years there were concerns that the Transnistrian authorities would try to sell these stocks internationally, and intense pressure was applied to have these removed by Russia.

In 2000 and 2001, Russia withdrew by rail 141 self-propelled artillery pieces and other armoured vehicles and locally destroyed 108 T-64 tanks and 139 other pieces of military equipment limited by the Treaty on Conventional Armed Forces in Europe (CFE). During 2002 and 2003 Russian military officials destroyed a further 51 armoured vehicles, all of which were types not limited by the CFE Treaty. The OSCE also observed and verified the withdrawal of 48 trains with military equipment and ammunition in 2003. However, no further withdrawal activities have taken place since March 2004 and a further 20,000 tons of ammunition, as well as some remaining military equipment, are still to be removed.

In the autumn of 2006, the Transnistrian leadership agreed to let an OSCE inspectorate examine the munitions and further access was agreed moving forward.

Recent weapons inspections were permitted by Transnistria and conducted by the OSCE. The onus of responsibility rests on Russia to remove the rest of the supplies.

Transnistrian authorities declared that they are not involved in the manufacture or export of weapons. OSCE and European Union officials stated in 2005 that there is no evidence that Transnistria "has ever trafficked arms or nuclear material" and much of the alarm is due to the Moldovan government's attempts to pressure Transnistria.

In 2007, foreign experts working on behalf of the United Nations said that the historically low levels of transparency and continued denial of full investigations to international monitors have reinforced negative perceptions of the Transnistrian government, although recent co-operation by Transnistrian authorities may have reflected a shift in the attitude of Transnistria. Their report stated that the evidence for the illicit production and trafficking of weapons into and from Transnistria, has in the past been exaggerated, although the trafficking of light weapons is likely to have occurred before 2001 (the last year when export data showed US$900,000 worth of 'weapons, munitions, their parts and accessories' exported from Transnistria). The report also states that the same holds true for the production of such weapons, which is likely to have been carried out in the 1990s, primarily to equip Transnistrian forces.

The OSCE mission spokesman Claus Neukirch spoke about this situation: "There is often talk about sale of armaments from Transnistria, but there is no convincing evidence".

In 2010, Viktor Kryzhanivsky, Ukraine's special envoy on Transnistria, stated that there was no ongoing arms or drug trafficking through the Transnistrian section of the Ukrainian-Moldovan border at the time.

=== Human rights ===
The human rights record of the Transnistrian authorities has been criticised by several governments and international organisations. The 2007 Freedom in the World report, published by the U.S.-based Freedom House, described it as a "non-free" territory, having an equally bad situation in both political rights and civil liberties.

According to a 2006 U.S. Department of State report:

The right of citizens to change their government was restricted ... Authorities reportedly continued to use torture and arbitrary arrest and detention ... In Transnistria authorities limited freedom of speech and of the press ... Authorities usually did not permit free assembly ... In the separatist region of Transnistria the authorities continued to deny registration and harassed a number of minority religious groups ... The separatist region remained a significant source and transit area for trafficking in persons ...

==== Romanian-language schools ====
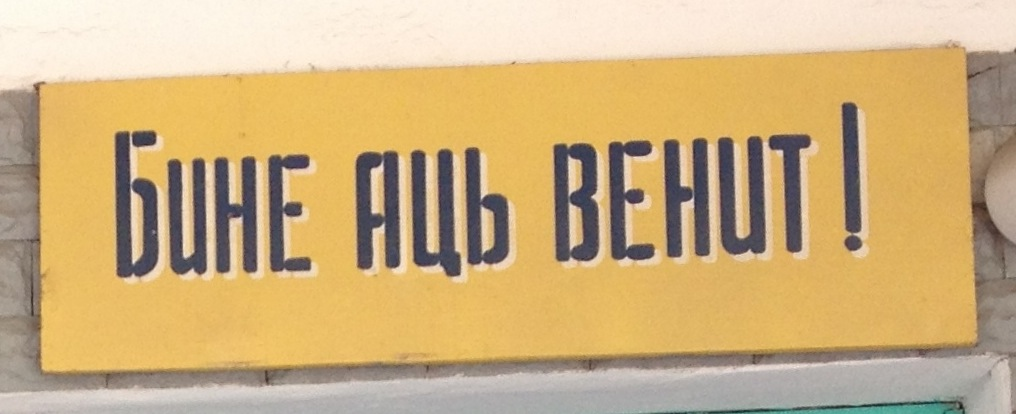
Welcome (Bine ați venit!) sign in Moldovan Cyrillic in Tiraspol. The Cyrillic alphabet was replaced by the Latin alphabet in 1989 in Moldova, but remains in use in Transnistria.

Public education in the Romanian language (officially called the Moldavian language in Transnistria) is done using the Soviet-originated Moldovan Cyrillic alphabet. The usage of the Latin script was restricted to only six schools. Four of these schools were forcibly closed by the authorities, for alleged refusal of the schools to apply for official accreditation. These schools were later registered as private schools and reopened, a development which may have been accelerated by pressure from the European Union.

The OSCE mission to Moldova has urged local authorities in the Transnistrian city of Rîbnița to return a confiscated building to the Moldovan Latin script school in the city. The unfinished building was nearing completion in 2004 when Transnistria took control of it during that year's school crisis.

In November 2005, Ion Iovcev, the principal of a Romanian-language school in Transnistria and active advocate for human rights as well as a critic of the Transnistrian leadership, received threatening calls that he attributed to his criticism of the separatist regime.

In August 2021, the Transnistrian government refused to register the Lucian Blaga High School at Tiraspol and forced it to suspend its activities for three months, which will affect the school year of the students of the school and constitutes a violation of several articles of the Convention on the Rights of the Child.

==== LGBTQ rights ====
Transnistria does not recognise same-sex unions. The Code of Marriage and Family that came into force in 2002 states that marriage is a voluntary marital union between a man and a woman. The code does not recognise other types of partnership for both opposite-sex and same-sex couples other than marriage.

== Status ==
Transnistrian territory in relation to the rest of Moldova, landlocked along the border with Ukraine. Note that this map treats lands at the west bank of the Dniester (such as Bender) as undisputed Transnistrian territory.

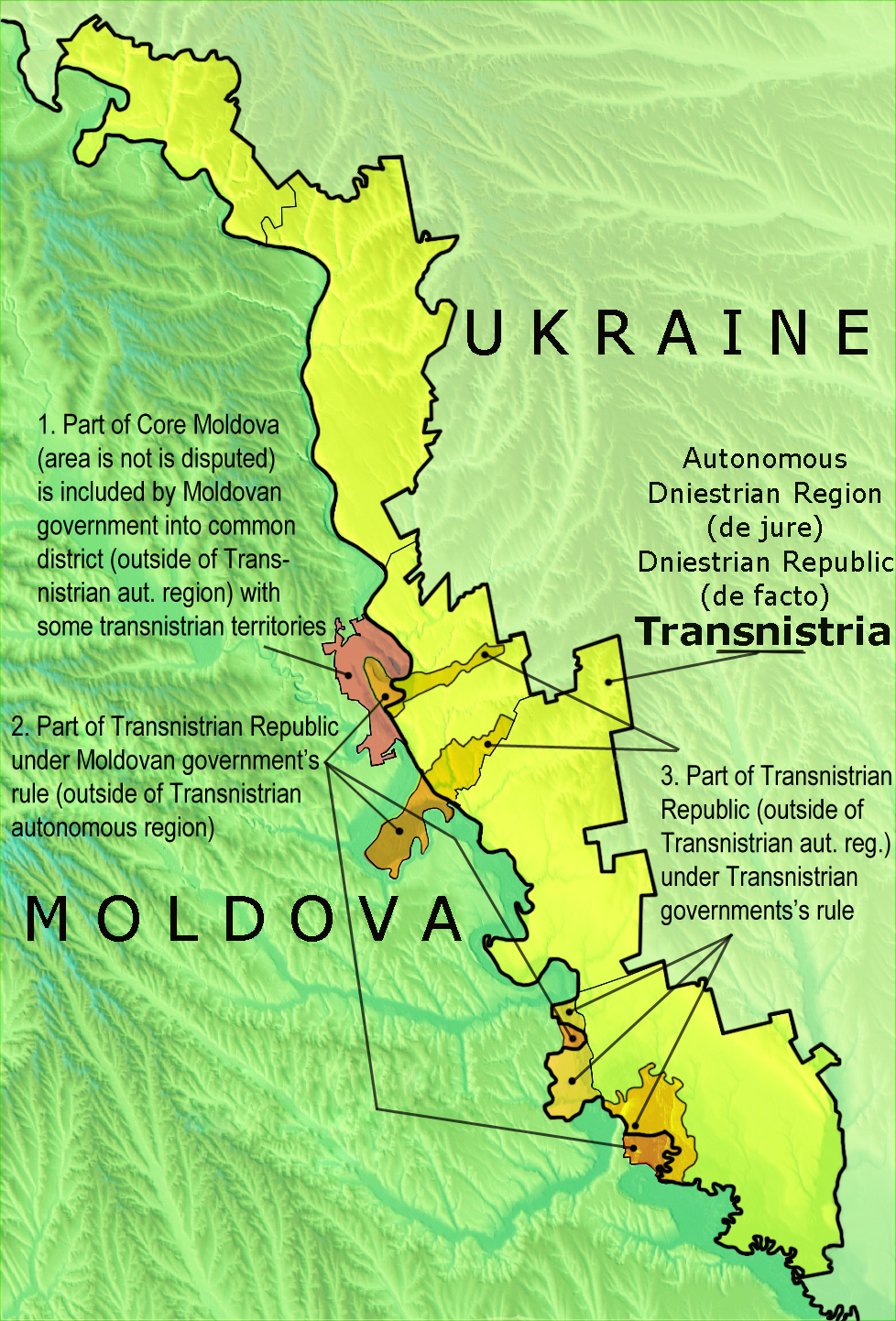
Political map of Transnistria with the differences between the de facto Pridnestrovian Moldavian Republic and the de jure Autonomous Dniestrian Territory

All UN member states consider Transnistria a part of the Republic of Moldova. Only the partially recognised or unrecognised states of South Ossetia and Abkhazia have recognised Transnistria as a sovereign entity after it declared independence from Moldova in 1990.

Although exercising no direct control over the territory of Transnistria, the Moldovan government passed the "Law on Basic Provisions of the Special Legal Status of Localities from the Left Bank of the Dniester" on 22 July 2005, which established part of Transnistria (territory of Pridnestrovian Moldavian Republic without Bender and without territories, which are under control of Moldova) as the Administrative-Territorial Units of the Left Bank of the Dniester within the Republic of Moldova.

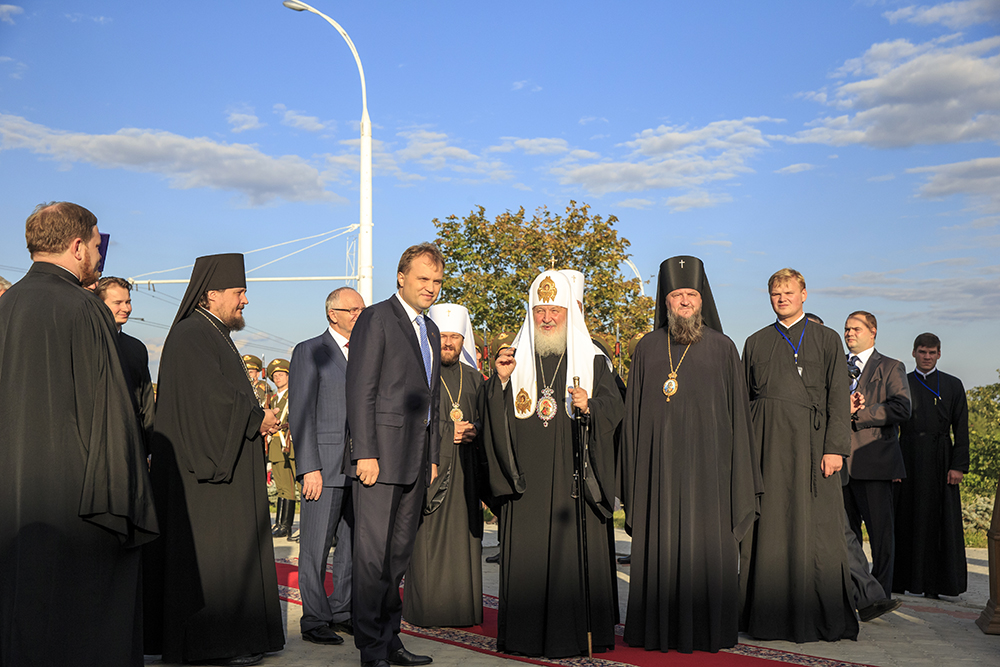
Former President of Transnistria Yevgeny Shevchuk, with Patriarch of Moscow and all Rus' Kirill and diocesan bishop of the Moldovan Orthodox Church Sabbas

According to the 2004 census, the population of Transnistria comprised 555,347 people, while at the 2015 census the population decreased to 475,373. In 2004, 90% of the population of Transnistria were citizens of Transnistria. Transnistrians may have dual, triple or even quadruple citizenship of internationally recognised countries, including:

- Citizens of Moldova: around 300,000 people (including dual citizens of Moldova and Russia, around 20,000) or of Moldova and the EU states (around 80%) of Romania, Bulgaria, or the Czech Republic
- Citizens of Romania: unknown number
- Citizens of Russia: around 150,000 people (including around 15,000 dual citizens of Belarus, Israel, Turkey); excluding those holding dual citizenship of Russia and of Moldova (around 20,000)
- Citizens of Ukraine: around 100,000 people There are around 20,000–30,000 people with dual citizenship (Moldova and Ukraine, or Russia and Ukraine) or triple citizenship (Moldova, Russia and Ukraine). They are included in the number of Ukrainian citizens.

Fifteen villages from the 11 communes of Dubăsari District, including Cocieri and Doroțcaia that geographically are located on the east bank of the Dniester (in Transnistria region), have been under the control of the central government of Moldova after the involvement of local inhabitants on the side of Moldovan forces during the War of Transnistria. These villages, along with Varnița and Copanca, near Bender and Tiraspol, are claimed by the PMR. One city (Bender) and six villages located on the west bank (in Bessarabia region) are controlled by the PMR, but are considered by Moldova as a separate municipality (Bender and village of Proteagailovca) or part of the Căușeni District (five villages in three communes).

Tense situations have periodically surfaced due to these territorial disputes, such as in 2005, when Transnistrian forces entered Vasilievca, in 2006 around Varnița, and in 2007 in the Dubăsari-Cocieri area, when a confrontation between Moldovan and Transnistrian forces occurred, though without any casualties.

June 2010 surveys indicated that 13% of Transnistria's population desired the area's reintegration into Moldova in the condition of territorial autonomy, while 46% wanted Transnistria to be part of the Russian Federation.

=== International relations ===
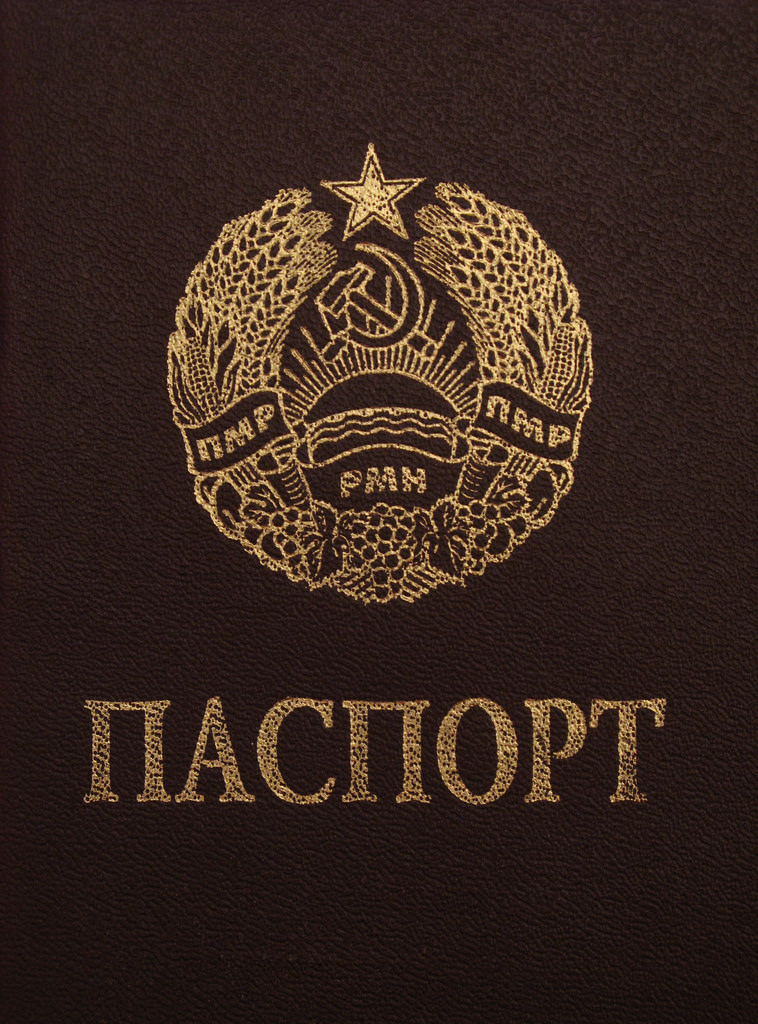
A Transnistrian passport

Transnistria is only recognised as independent by Abkhazia and South Ossetia, both of which are non-UN member states with limited recognition. Transnistria is not a member of the UN.

Nina Shtanski served as Transnistria's Minister of Foreign Affairs from 2012 to 2015; Vitaly Ignatiev succeeded her as minister. In 2024, Ignatiev was declared wanted by the Security Service of Ukraine due to suspicion of collaboration with Russia and encroachment on the territorial integrity of Ukraine.

== Economy ==
Transnistria has a mixed economy. Following a large scale privatisation process in the late 1990s, most of the companies in Transnistria are now privately owned. The economy is based on a mix of heavy industry (steel production), electricity production, and manufacturing (textile production), which together account for about 80% of the total industrial output.

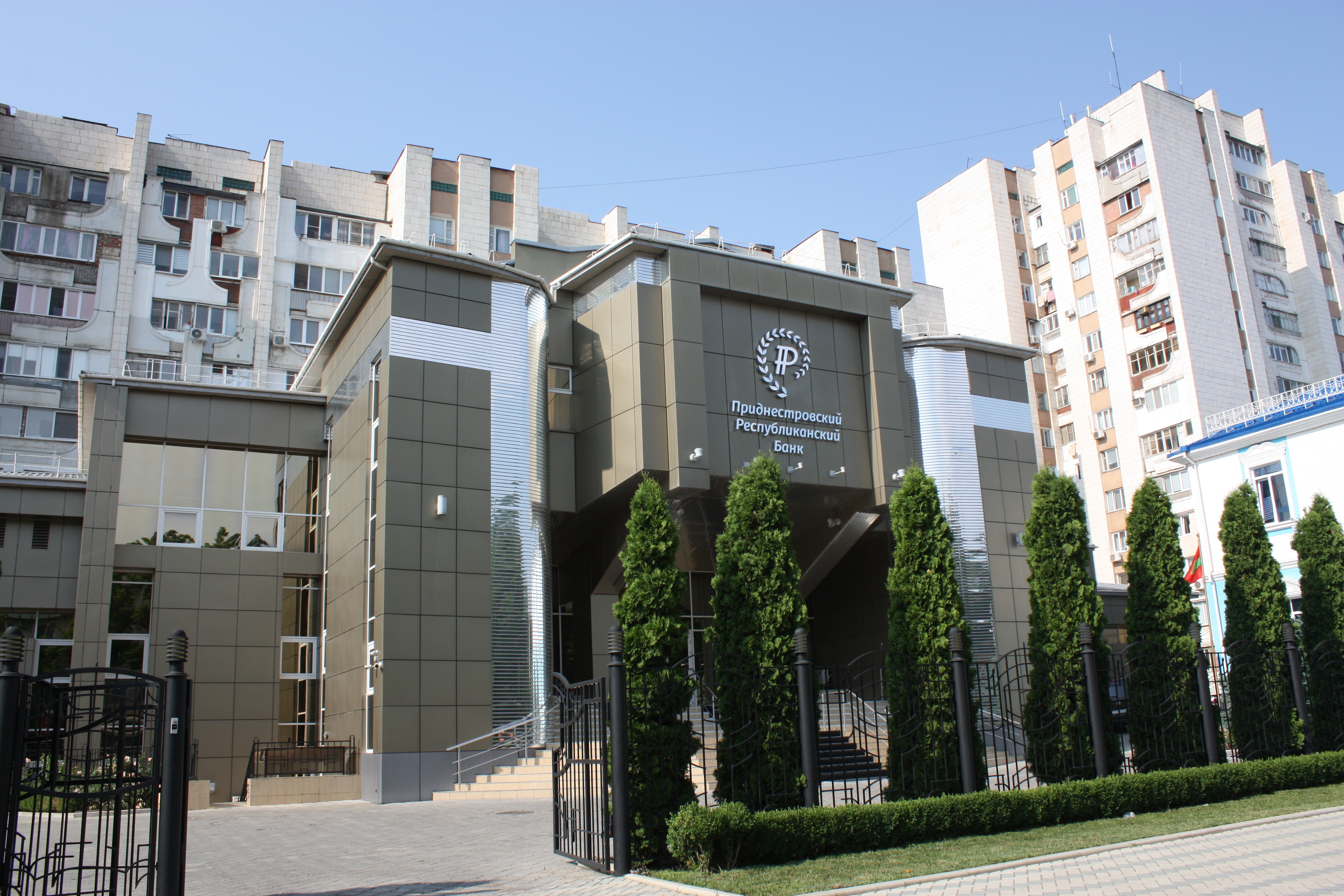
Transnistria's central bank, the Transnistrian Republican Bank

Transnistria has its own central bank, the Transnistrian Republican Bank, which issues its national currency, the Transnistrian ruble. It is convertible at a freely floating exchange rate but only in Transnistria. In May 2019, NBM governor Octavian Armașu described the acceptance of the Moldovan leu in Transnistria as a prerequisite for integration into Moldova's banking system.

Transnistria's economy is frequently described as dependent on contraband and gunrunning. Some commentators, including Zbigniew Brzezinski, have even labelled it a mafia state. These allegations are denied by the Transnistrian government, and sometimes downplayed by the officials of Russia and Ukraine.

=== Economic history ===
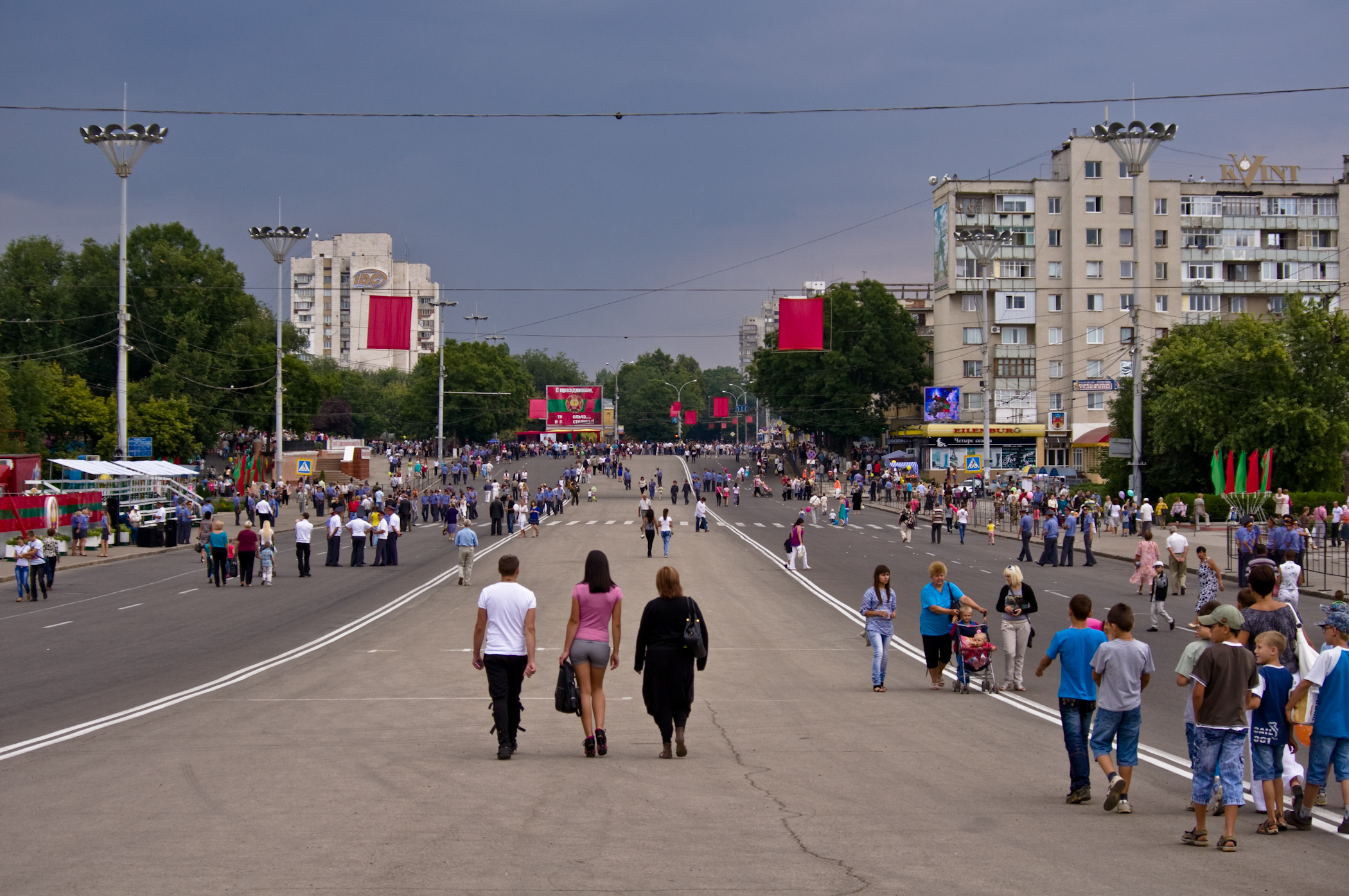
Tiraspol, capital of Transnistria

After World War II, Transnistria was heavily industrialised, to the point that, in 1990, it was responsible for 40% of Moldova's GDP and 90% of its electricity, although it accounted for only 17% of Moldova's population. After the collapse of the Soviet Union, Transnistria wanted to return to a "Brezhnev-style planned economy". However, several years later, it decided to head toward a market economy.

=== Macroeconomics ===
According to the government of Transnistria, the 2007 GDP was 6789 mln ruble (appx US$799 million) and the GDP per capita was about US$1,500. The GDP increased by 11.1% and inflation rate was 19.3% with the GDP per capita being $2,140, higher than the contemporaneous Moldovan GDP per capita of $2,040. Transnistria's government budget for 2007 was US$246 million, with an estimated deficit of about US$100 million that the government planned to cover with income from privatisations. The budget for 2008 is US$331 million, with an estimated deficit of about US$80 million.

In 2004, Transnistria had debts of US$1.2 billion (two-thirds are with Russia) that was per capita about six times higher than in Moldova (without Transnistria). In March 2007 the debt to Gazprom for the acquisition of natural gas increased to US$1.3 billion. On 22 March 2007 Gazprom sold Transnistria's gas debt to the Russian businessman Alisher Usmanov, who controls Moldova Steel Works, the largest enterprise in Transnistria. Transnistria's president Igor Smirnov announced that Transnistria will not pay its gas debt because "Transnistria has no legal debt to Gazprom". In November 2007, the total debt of Transnistria's public sector was up to US$1.64 billion.

In the first half of 2023, the economic situation worsened with imports increasing 12% to $1.32 billion and exports falling by 10% to just $346m, the trade deficit of $970m, almost equal to the GDP of Transnistria in the whole of 2021, being financed by the non-payment of natural gas supplies from Russia.

=== External trade ===
In 2020, the Transnistrian Customs reported exports of US$633.1 million and imports of US$1,052.7 million. In the early 2000s over 50% of the export went to the CIS, mainly to Russia, but also to Belarus, Ukraine, and Moldova (which Transnistrian authorities consider foreign). Main non-CIS markets for the Transnistrian goods were Italy, Egypt, Greece, Romania, and Germany. The CIS accounted for over 60% of the imports, while the share of the EU was about 23%. The main imports were non-precious metals, food products, and electricity.

After Moldova signed the Association Agreement with the EU in 2014, Transnistria – being claimed as part of Moldova – enjoyed the tariff-free exports to the EU. As a result, in 2015, 27% of Transnistria's US$189 million exports went to the EU, while exports to Russia went down to 7.7%. This shift towards the EU market continued to grow in 2016.

From March 2022, with the Ukrainian border closed to Transnistria, all trade goods to and from Transnistria have needed to flow through Moldova, Transnistria now has to comply with Moldovan and EU standards when exporting products. Transnistria reported on trade in the first half of 2023. 48% of exports were to the rest of Moldova, over 33% went to the EU and 9% to Russia. 68% of imports came from Russia, 14% from the EU and 7% from Moldova.

In 2024, as a result of the free trade agreement between Moldova and the European Union, from which Transnistria also benefits, Moldova decided that imports/exports to/from Transnistria should be treated the same as imports/exports to/from Moldova, accordingly Transnistria importers wishing to import from/through Moldova must register and may, depending on the goods, be subject to taxes on imported goods, payable to Moldova.

On 30 December 2024, Tirasteploenegro released a set of instructions – anticipating the expiration of Gazprom's deal with Ukraine, saying to only drain the pipes and batteries in emergencies, to close every tap that has been running (if the water supply disappears) to avoid flooding when it turns back on, to "dress warmly", to avoid fires during winter and autumn, to not use gas or electric stoves for heating rooms as it may lead to tragedy, and to instead use factory-made electric heaters only; not home-made ones.

On 1 January 2025, Gazprom's deal with Ukraine to transport gas through it expired, as Ukraine had refused to extend the deal, calling it a "historic moment". This caused a severe gas shortage, and so only critical infrastructure was allowed to be heated, and houses were dropped from it to save on gas. The Cuciurgan power station, which is both Transnistria's and Moldova's main plant, is now also being fuelled with coal, however the supply is only enough for 50 days.

=== Economic sectors ===
The leading industry is steel, due to the Moldova Steel Works (part of the Russian Metalloinvest holding) in Rîbnița, which accounts for about 60% of the budget revenue of Transnistria. The largest company in the textile industry is Tirotex, which claims to be the second largest textile company in Europe. The energy sector is dominated by Russian companies. The largest power company Moldavskaya GRES (Cuciurgan power station) is in Dnestrovsc and owned by Inter RAO UES, and the gas transmission and distribution company Tiraspoltransgaz is probably controlled by Gazprom, although Gazprom has not confirmed the ownership officially. The banking sector of Transnistria consists of 8 commercial banks, including Gazprombank. The oldest alcohol producer KVINT, located in Tiraspol, produces and exports brandy, wines and vodka.

== Demographics ==
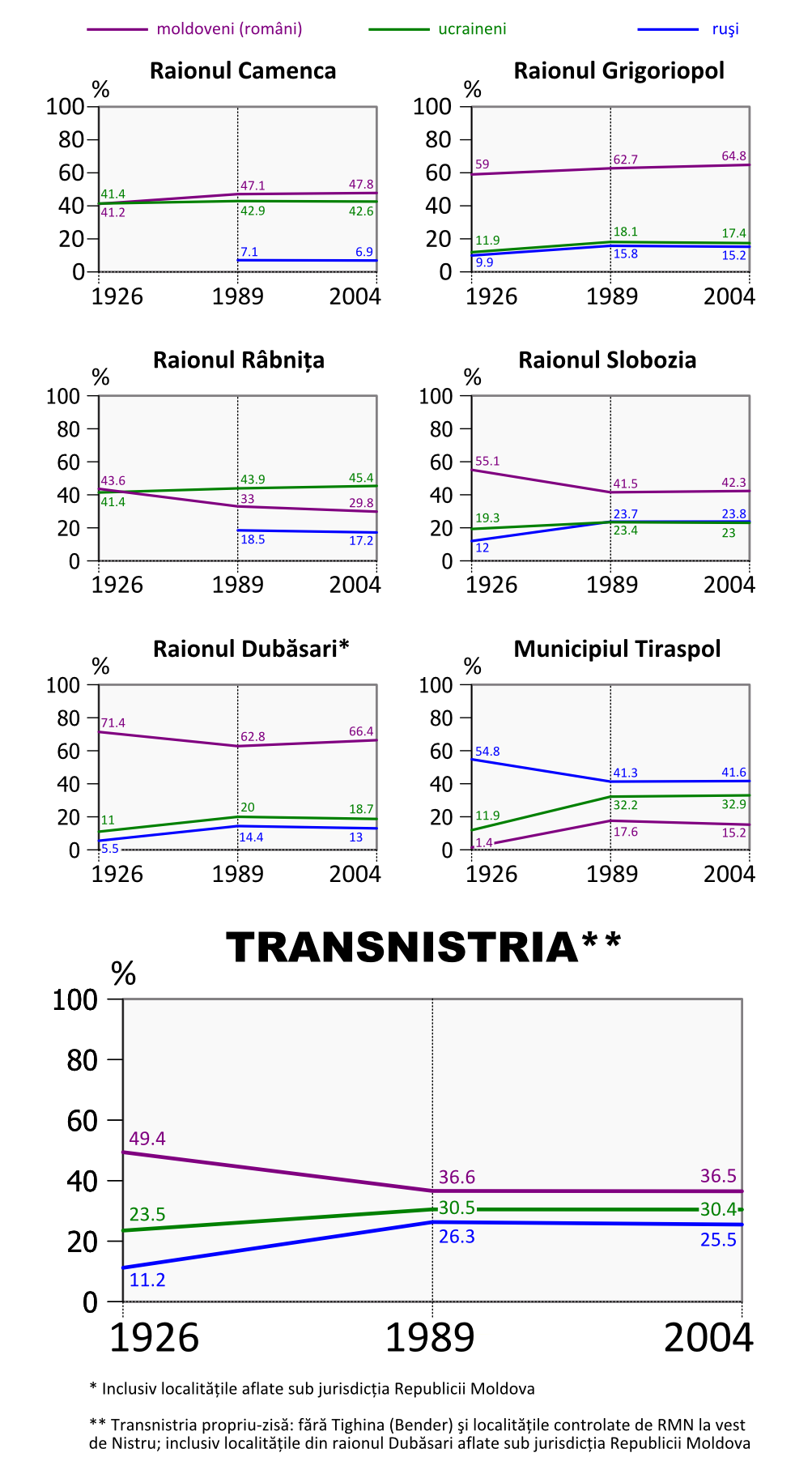
Demographic evolution in Transnistrian regions and the city of Tiraspol. Purple: Moldovans (Romanians), green: Ukrainians, blue: Russians.

=== 2015 census ===
In October 2015, Transnistrian authorities organised another separate census from the 2014 Moldovan census. According to the 2015 census, the population of the region was 475,373, a 14.5% decrease from the figure recorded in the 2004 census. The urbanisation rate was 69.9%. By ethnic composition, the population of Transnistria was distributed as follows: Russians – 29.1%, Moldovans – 28.6%, Ukrainians – 22.9%, Bulgarians – 2.4%, Gagauzians – 1.1%, Belarusians – 0.5%, Transnistrian – 0.2%, other nationalities – 1.4%. About 14% of the population did not declare their nationality. Also, for the first time, the population had the option to identify as "Transnistrian".

According to another source, the largest ethnic groups in 2015 were 161,300 Russians (34%), 156,600 Moldovans (33%), and 126,700 Ukrainians (26.7%). Bulgarians comprised 13,300 (2.8%), Gagauz 5,700 (1.2%) and Belarusians 2,800 (0.6%). Germans accounted for 1,400 or 0.3% and Poles for 1,000 or 0.2%. All other ethnic groups combined accounted for 5,700 people or 1.2%.

=== 2004 census ===
In 2004, Transnistrian authorities organised a separate census from the 2004 Moldovan Census. As per 2004 census, in the areas controlled by the PMR government, there were 555,347 people, including 177,785 Moldovans (32.1%) 168,678 Russians (30.4%) 160,069 Ukrainians (28.8%) 13,858 Bulgarians (2.5%) 4,096 Gagauzians (0.7%), 1,791 Poles (0.3%), 1,259 Jews (0.2%), 507 Roma (0.1%) and 27,454 others (4.9%).

Of these, 439,243 lived in Transnistria itself, and 116,104 lived in localities controlled by the PMR government, but formally belonging to other districts of Moldova: the city of Bender (Tighina), the communes of Proteagailovca, Gîsca, Chițcani, Cremenciug, and the village of Roghi of commune Molovata Nouă.

Moldovans were the largest ethnic group, representing an overall majority in the two districts in the central Transnistria (Dubăsari District, 50.2%, and Grigoriopol District, 64.8%) a 47.8% relative majority in the northern Camenca District, and a 41.5% relative majority in the southern (Slobozia District). In Rîbnița District they were a 29.9% minority, and in the city of Tiraspol, they constituted a 15.2% minority of the population.

As per last census, Russians were the second largest ethnic group, representing a 41.6% relative majority in the city of Tiraspol, a 24.1% minority in Slobozia, a 19.0% minority in Dubăsari, a 17.2% minority in Râbnița, a 15.3% minority in Grigoriopol, and a 6.9% minority in Camenca.

Ukrainians were the third largest ethnic group, representing a 45.41% relative majority in the northern Rîbnița District, a 42.6% minority in Camenca, a 33.0% minority in Tiraspol, a 28.3% minority in Dubăsari, a 23.4% minority in Slobozia, and a 17.4% minority in Grigoriopol. A substantial number of Poles clustered in northern Transnistria were Ukrainianised during Soviet rule.

Bulgarians were the fourth largest ethnic group in Transnistria, albeit much less numerous than the three larger ethnicities. Most Bulgarians in Transnistria are Bessarabian Bulgarians, descendants of expatriates who settled in Bessarabia in the 18th–19th century. The major centre of Bulgarians in Transnistria is the large village of Parcani (situated between the cities of Tiraspol and Bender), which had an absolute Bulgarian majority and a total population of around 10,000.

In Bender (Tighina) and the other non-Transnistria localities under PMR control, ethnic Russians represented a 43.4% relative majority, followed by Moldovans at 26.2%, Ukrainians at 17.1%, Bulgarians at 2.9%, Gagauzians at 1.0%, Jews at 0.3%, Poles at 0.2%, Roma at 0.1%, and others at 7.8%.

=== 1989 census ===
At the census of 1989, the population was 679,000 (including all the localities in the security zone, even those under Moldovan control). The ethnic composition of the region has been unstable in recent history, with the most notable change being the decreasing share of Moldovan and Jewish population segments and increase of the Russian. For example, the percentage of Russians grew from 13.7% in 1926 to 25.5% in 1989 and further to 30.4% in 2004, while the Moldovan population decreased from 44.1% in 1926 to 39.9% in 1989 and 31.9% in 2004. Only the proportion of Ukrainians remained reasonably stable – 27.2% in 1926, 28.3% in 1989 and 28.8% in 2004.

Largest cities or towns in Transnistria State Statistics Service of Pridnestrovie
Rank	Name	District	Pop.
1	Tiraspol	Tiraspol	129,367 (2015 census)
2	Bender	Bender, Moldova	91,197 (2015 census)
3	Rîbnița	Rîbnița District	46,000 (2015 census)
4	Dubăsari	Dubăsari District	23,650 (2004 census)
5	Slobozia	Slobozia District	16,062 (2004 census)
6	Dnestrovsc	Slobozia District	10,000 (2015 census)
7	Camenca	Camenca District	10,323 (2004 census)
8	Grigoriopol	Grigoriopol District	10,252 (2004 census)
9	Sucleia	Slobozia District	10,001 (2004 census)
10	Parcani	Slobozia District	<8,000 (2004 census)

=== Religion ===
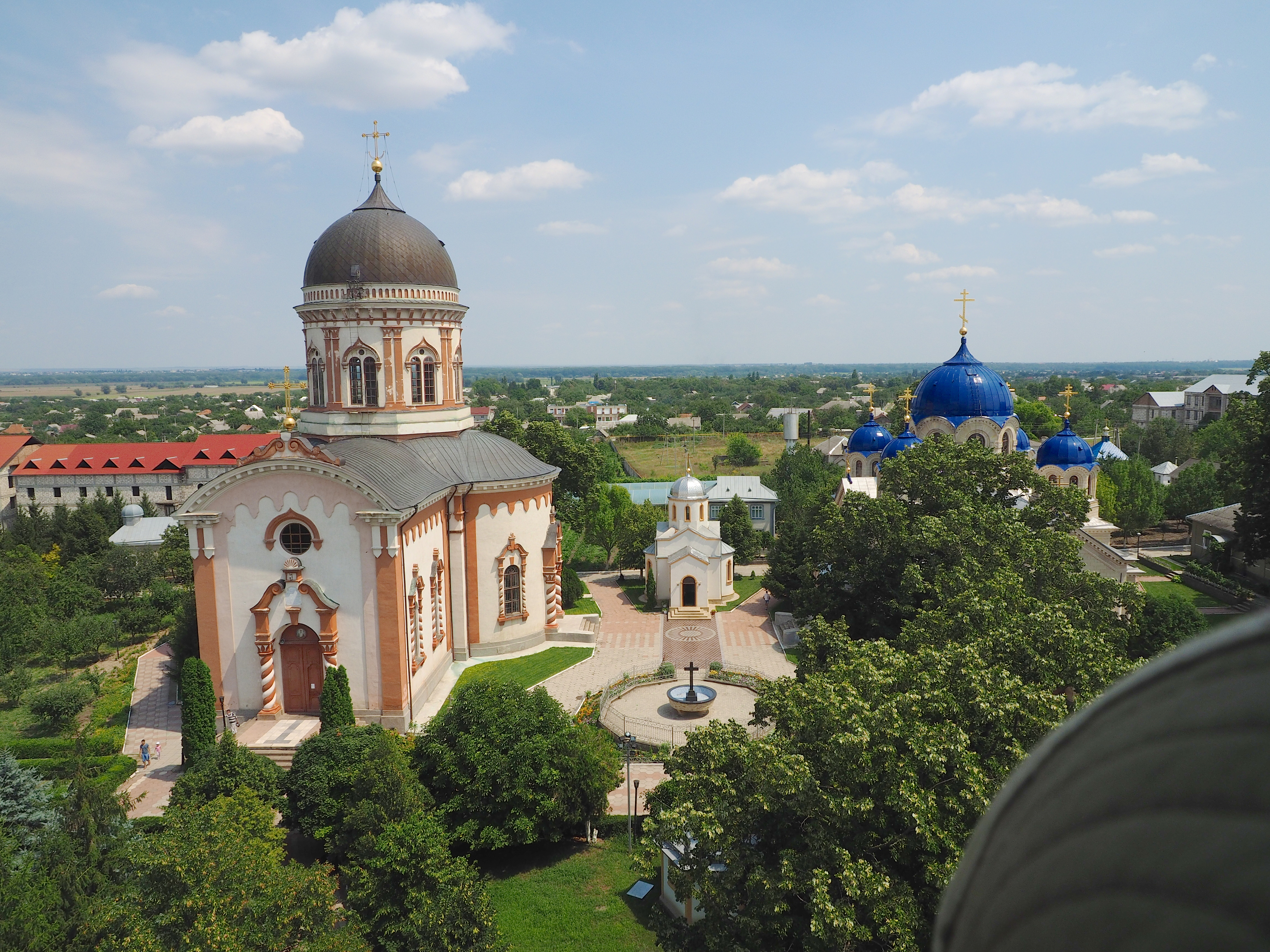
Noul Neamț Monastery

PMR official statistics show that 92% of the Transnistrian population adhere to Eastern Orthodox Christianity, with 4% adhering to Roman Catholicism. Roman Catholics are mainly located in northern Transnistria, where a notable Polish minority lives.

Transnistria's government has supported the restoration and construction of new Orthodox churches. It affirms that the republic has freedom of religion and states that 114 religious beliefs and congregations are officially registered. However, as recently as 2005, registration hurdles were met with by some religious groups, notably the Jehovah's Witnesses. In 2007, the US-based Christian Broadcasting Network denounced the persecution of Protestants in Transnistria.

=== Education ===
Transnistria has kept to the Russian educational standards, mainly using the Russian curriculum.

Higher education diplomas issued by Transnistrian authorities are not recognised by most countries, resulting in graduates being unable to obtain well-paid jobs in Moldova or Western countries, leaving Russia as the default location for students and graduates.

== Culture ==
=== Media ===
There is a regular mix of modern news media in Transnistria with a number of television stations, newspapers, and radio stations.

According to the Organization for Security and Co-operation in Europe (OSCE) the media climate in Transnistria is restrictive and the authorities continue a long-standing campaign to silence independent opposition voices and groups.

According to a US Department of State report for 2006, "Both of the region's major newspapers were controlled by the authorities. There was one independent weekly newspaper in Bender and another in the northern city of Rîbnița ... Separatist authorities harassed independent newspapers for critical reporting of the Transnistrian regime ... Most television and radio stations and print publication were controlled by Transnistrian authorities, which largely dictated their editorial policies and finance operations. Some broadcast networks, such as the TSV television station and the INTER-FM radio station, were owned by Transnistria's largest monopoly, Sheriff, which also holds a majority in the region's legislature ... In July 2005 the Transnistrian Supreme Council amended the election code to prohibit media controlled by the Transnistrian authorities from publishing results of polls and forecasts related to elections".

=== Sport ===
Transnistria is notable for being home to the Sheriff Tiraspol football club, which in 2021 became the first team representing Moldova to qualify for the UEFA Champions League group stage. In 2022, UEFA blocked Sheriff from playing home games in Transnistria.

== See also ==
- List of active separatist movements in Europe
