= Tiraspol =

Capital and largest city of Transnistria, a breakaway state of Moldova

Tiraspol: Тираспол; Тирасполь
- Municipality
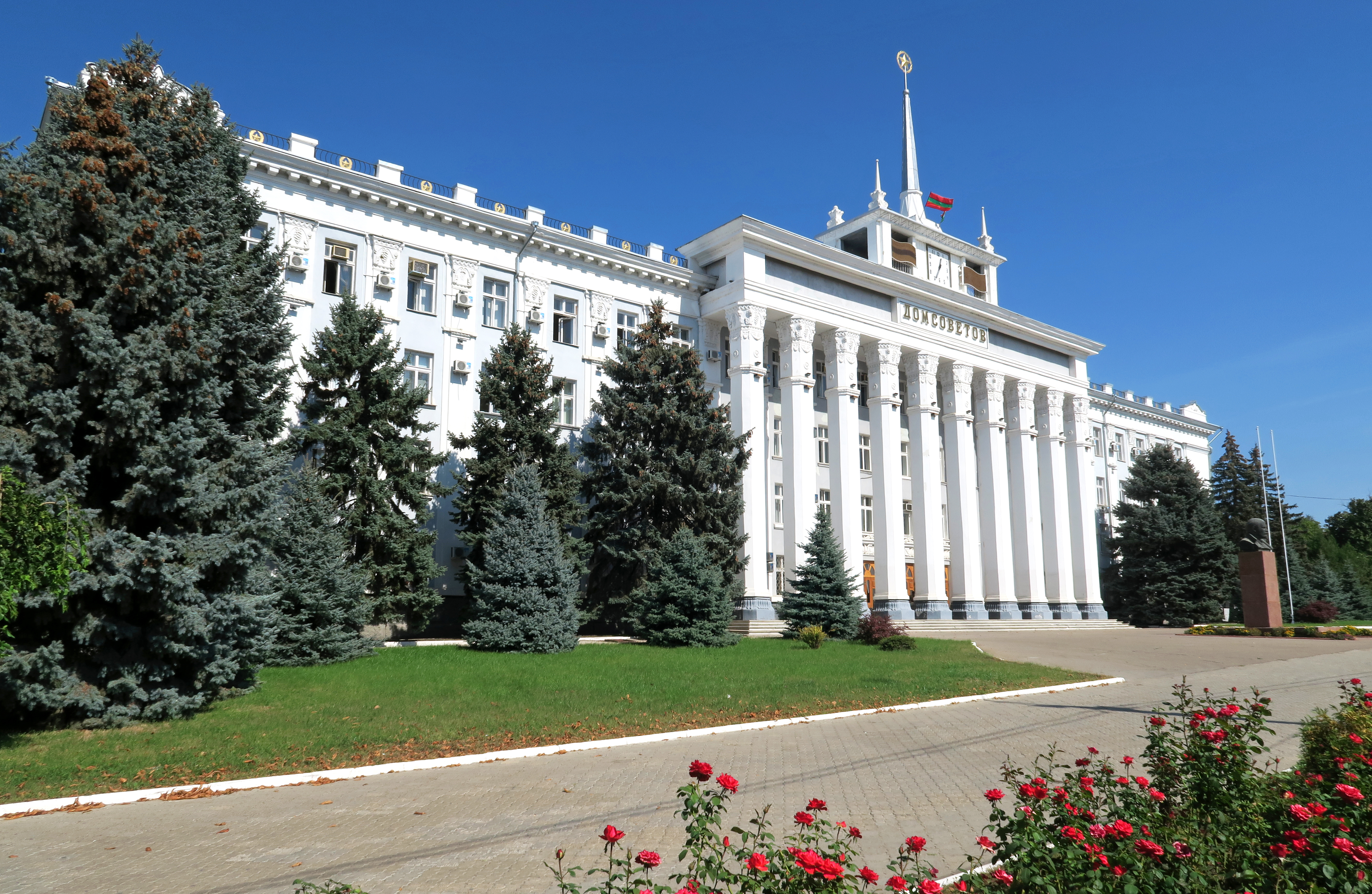
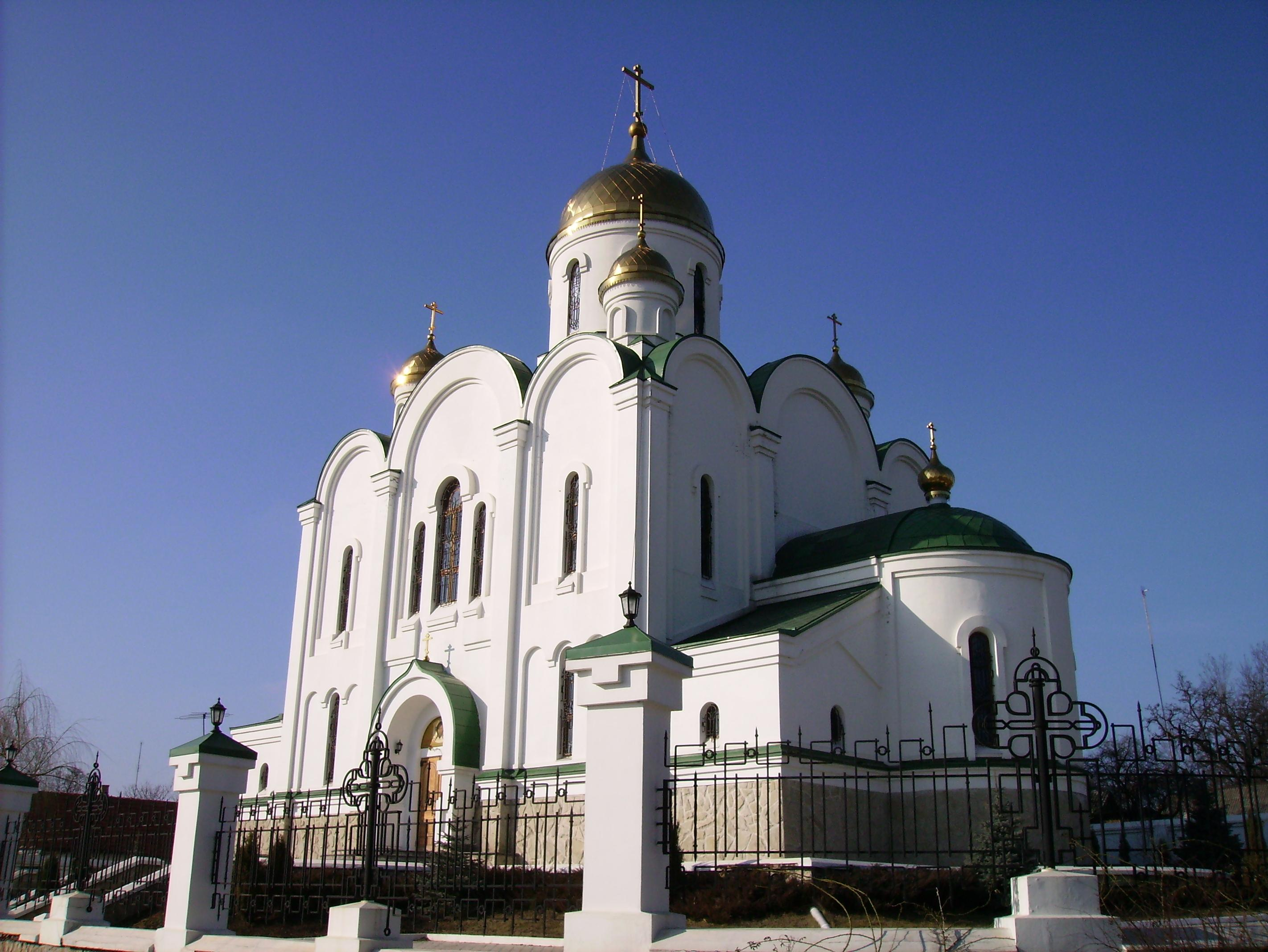
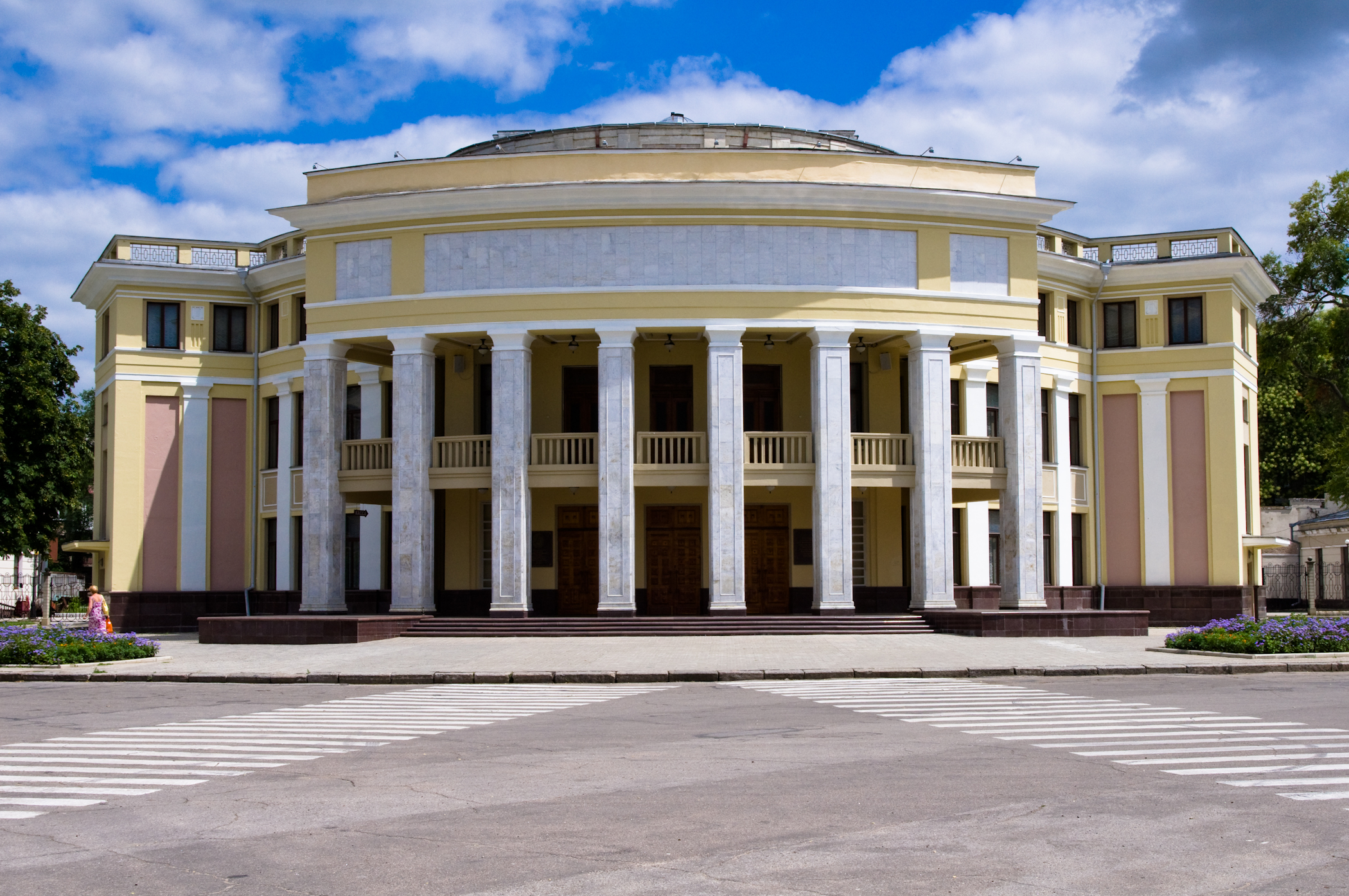
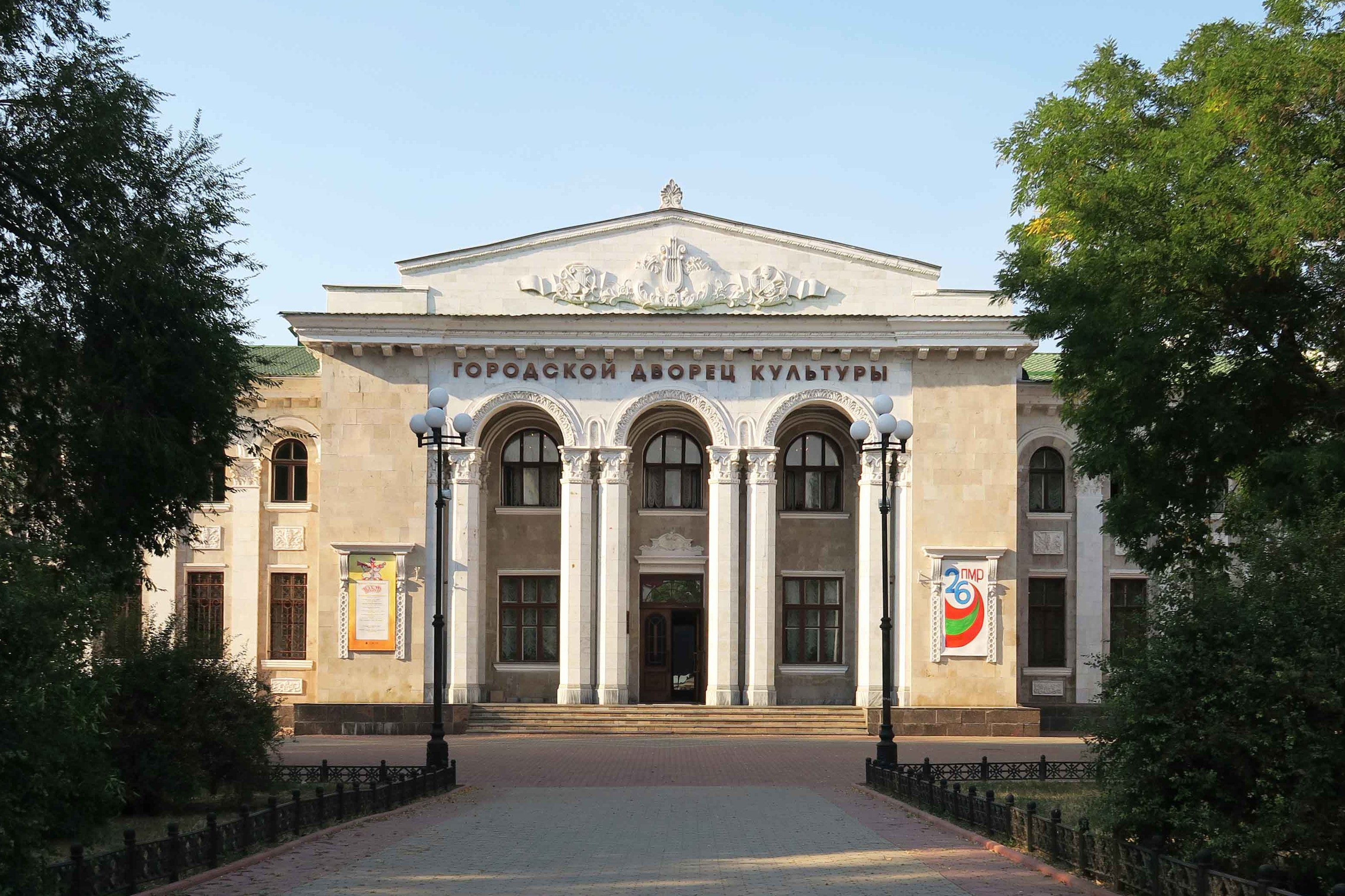
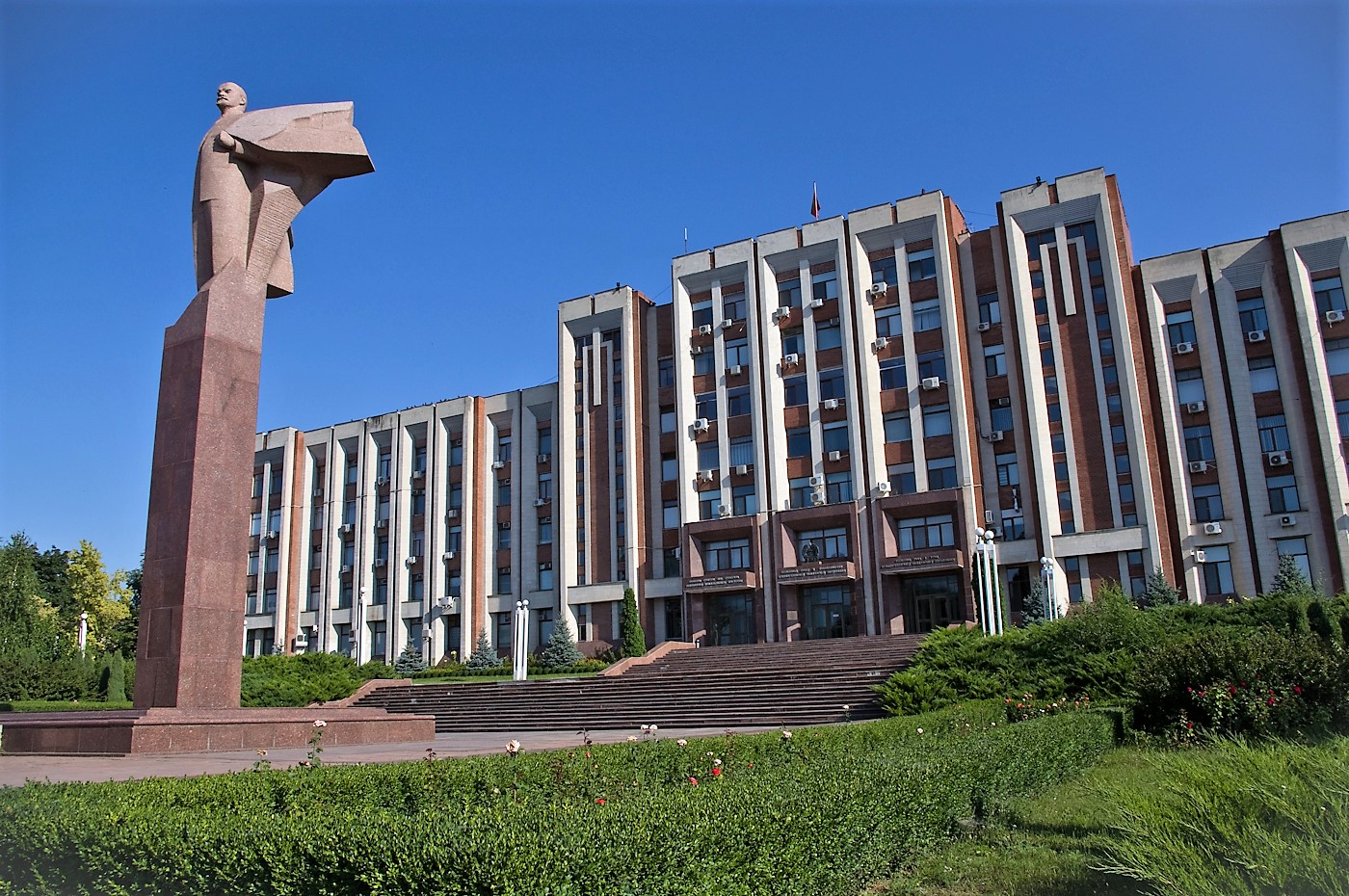
- City Hall Church of the Nativity Drama theater Palace of Culture Supreme Council of Transnistria

- Flag Coat of arms
- Anthem: "Be glorious, our city!"
- Location within Transnistria Location within Moldova Location within Europe
- Coordinates: 46.84028°N 29.64333°E
- Country: Moldova (de jure); Transnistria (de facto) (Note: Transnistria's political status is disputed. It considers itself to be an independent state, but this is not recognised by any UN member state. The Moldovan government and the international community consider Transnistria a part of Moldova's territory.)
- Founded: 1792
- City rights: 1795

Government
  - Head of the State Administration of Tiraspol: Ilona Tyuryaeva

Area
  - Total: 55.56 km^{2} (21.45 sq mi)
- Elevation: 26 m (85 ft)

Population (2025)
  - Total: 126,306
- Area code: +373 533
- Website: tirasadmin.gospmr.org

Tiraspol (Romanian pronunciation: [tiˈraspol], Moldovan Cyrillic: Тираспол; also Tirișpolea, Тиришполя; Russian: Тирасполь, romanized: Tiraspol', [tʲɪˈraspəlʲ]; Ukrainian: Тирасполь, romanized: Tyraspol', [tɪˈrɑspolʲ]) is the capital and largest city of Transnistria, a breakaway state of Moldova, where it is the second-largest city. The city is located on the eastern bank of the Dniester River. Tiraspol is a regional hub of culture, economy, tourism, and light industry, such as furniture and electrical goods production.

The modern city of Tiraspol was founded by the Russian generalissimo Alexander Suvorov in 1792, although the area had been inhabited for thousands of years by varying ethnic groups. The city celebrates its anniversary every year on 14 October.

== Etymology ==
The toponym consists of two ancient Greek words: Τύρας, Tyras, the Ancient name for the Dniester River, and polis, i.e., a city (state).

== History ==
Historical affiliations

- Republic of Moldova 1991–present (de jure)
- Transnistria 1990–present (de facto)
- (Soviet Union) USSR 1944–1991
- Kingdom of Romania 1941–1944
- USSR 1922–1941
- Ukrainian SSR 1921–1922
- Ukrainian People's Republic 1917-1919
- Russian Republic 1917
- Russian Empire 1792–1917

=== Classical and medieval history ===
Tyras (Τύρας), also spelled Tiras, was a colony of the Greek city Miletus, probably founded about 600 BC, situated some 10 kilometres (6 miles) from the mouth of the Tiras River (Dniester). Of no great importance in early times, in the second century BC it fell under the dominion of indigenous kings whose names appear on its coins. It was destroyed by the Thracian Getae about 50 BC.

In 56 AD, the Romans restored the city and made it part of the colonial province of Lower Moesia. A series of its coins exist that feature heads of Roman emperors from Domitian to Severus Alexander. Soon after the time of the latter, the city was destroyed again, this time by the invasion of the Goths. Its government was in the hands of five archons, a senate, a popular assembly, and a registrar. The images on its coins from this period suggest a trade in wheat, wine, and fish. The few inscriptions extant are mostly concerned with trade.

Such ancient archaeological remains are scanty, as the city site was built over by the great medieval fortress of Monocastro or Akkerman. In the Late Middle Ages, the area around of modern Tiraspol became part of the Grand Duchy of Lithuania. The Lithuanians, unable to settle their vast state on their own, allowed Moldavian settlement in the area.

=== Tsarist Russian rule ===
The Russian Empire conquered its way to the Dniester River, taking territory from the Ottoman Empire. In 1792 the Russian army built fortifications to guard the western border near a Moldavian village named Sucleia. Field Marshal Alexander Suvorov is considered the founder of modern Tiraspol; his statue is the city's most distinctive landmark. The city took its name from Tyras, the Greek name of the Dniester River on which it stands. It was granted city rights in 1795.

In 1828, the Russian government established a customs house in Tiraspol to try to suppress smuggling. The customs house was subordinated to the chief of the Odesa customs region. It began operations with 14 employees. They inspected shipments of bread, paper, oil, wine, sugar, fruits and other goods.

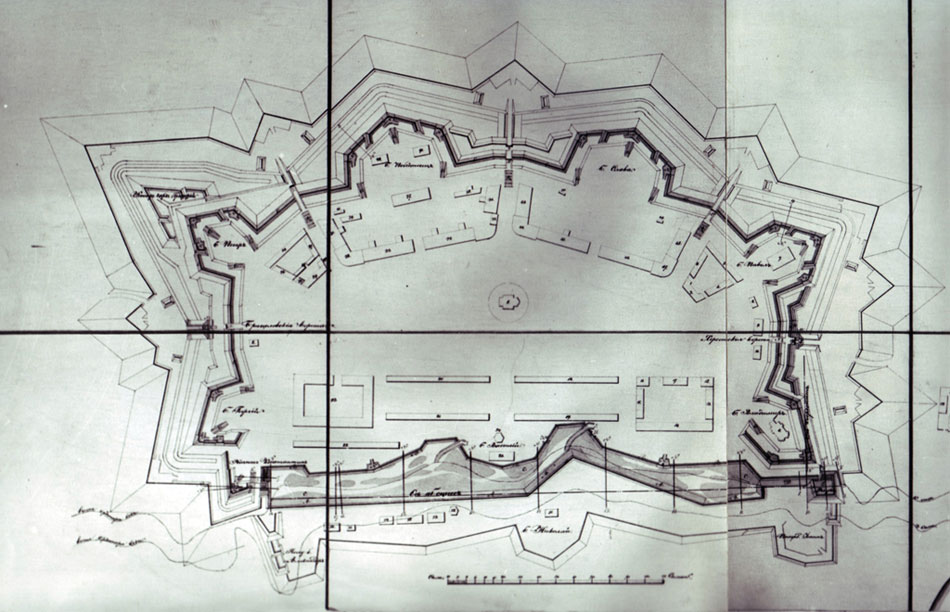
1856 plan of the Tiraspol Fortress

In December 1917, Tiraspol hosted a congress of Transnistrian Moldovans, at which they wished to unite the city with Bessarabia.

=== Soviet Tiraspol ===
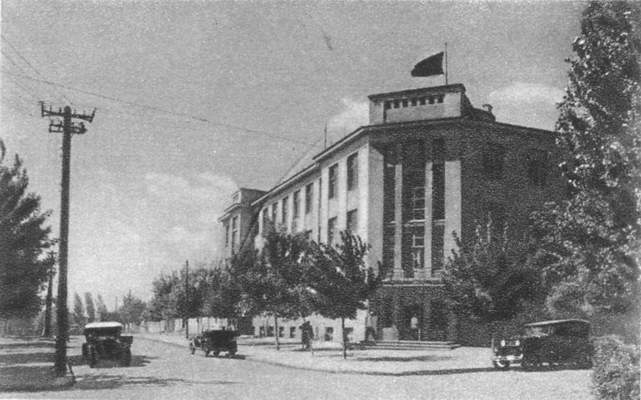
Tiraspol in 1941

After the Russian Revolution, the Moldavian Autonomous Soviet Socialist Republic was created in Ukraine in 1924, with Balta as its capital. The republic had Romanian, Ukrainian and Russian as its official languages. Its capital was moved in 1929 to Tiraspol, which remained the capital of the Moldavian ASSR until 1940.

In 1940, following the secret provisions of the Molotov–Ribbentrop Pact, the USSR forced Romania to cede Bessarabia. It integrated Tiraspol, until then part of the Moldavian ASSR, into the newly formed Moldavian SSR. On 7 August 1941, following the Axis invasion of the Soviet Union, the city was taken over by Romanian troops. Later that month, on 19 August, the Tiraspol Agreement establishing the Transnistria Governorate was signed. During the occupation, Tiraspol was under Romanian administration. During that period almost all of its Jewish population died: they were slain in situ or deported to German Nazi death camps, and killed there.

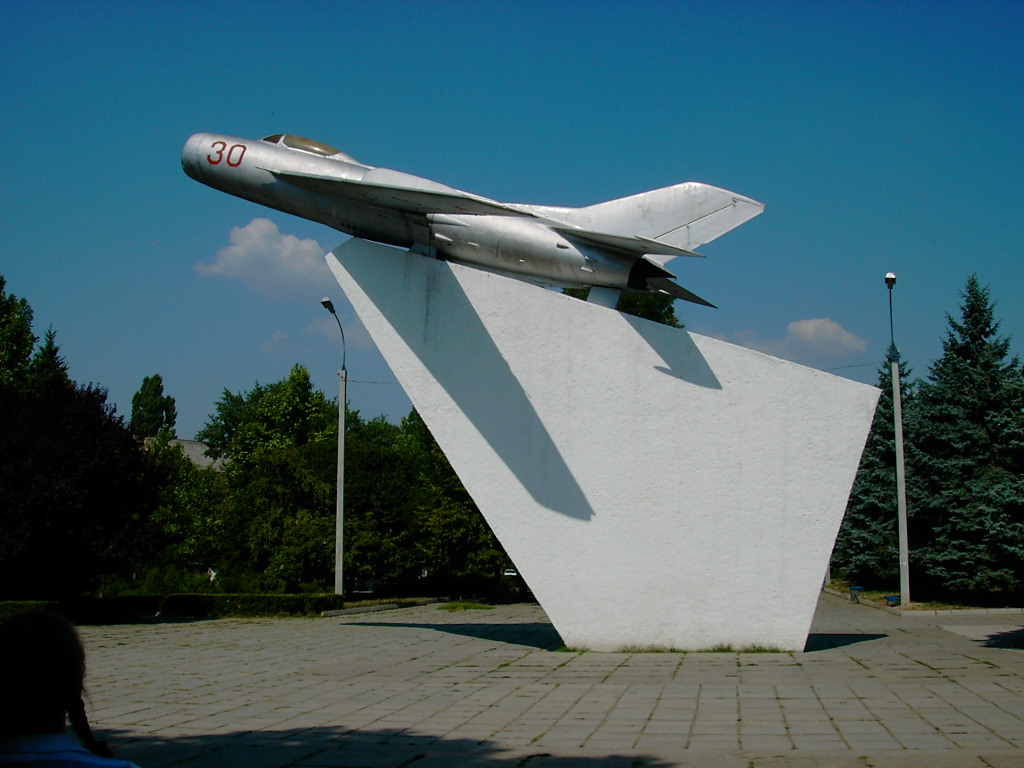
Soviet MiG-19 monument

In 1941, before the occupation, the newspaper Dnestrovskaya Pravda was founded by the Tiraspol City Council of popular deputies. This is the oldest periodical publication in the region. On 12 April 1944, the city was retaken by the Red Army and became again part of the Moldavian SSR.

According to a 1991 figure by Moldova's Ministry of National Security (now the Security and Intelligence Service, SIS), of the 5,485 people who were sentenced to death in the territory of modern Moldova during totalitarian communist rule, over 4,000 of them were executed in Tiraspol, in the city's fortress, in 1937 and 1938 alone, during the Great Purge.

=== Jewish community ===
Tiraspol had a substantial Jewish community by the late nineteenth and early twentieth centuries. In 1926, 6,398 Jews lived in the city, comprising 29.1 percent of its population. During the Soviet period many Jewish residents worked as artisans, some of whom were organized into cooperatives. Two Yiddish-language schools operated in the city, including a vocational school. Migration from nearby villages and smaller towns contributed to the growth of the community during the interwar period. On the eve of the German invasion of the Soviet Union in 1941, approximately 12,000 Jews lived in Tiraspol, constituting about one-quarter of the city's population.

=== The Holocaust ===
German and Romanian forces occupied Tiraspol on 8 August 1941. An unknown number of Jews evacuated or fled eastward before the occupation. Most of those who remained were murdered by German forces during the first days of the occupation, while a small number survived with the assistance of local Christians who concealed them. On 1 September, after Tiraspol was incorporated into the Romanian-administered Transnistria Governorate, the city passed under Romanian administration. From September 1941 it became an important transit point for thousands of Jews deported by Romanian authorities into Transnistria, many of whom were subsequently sent onward to ghettos and camps in the interior of the governorate.

By the summer of 1942, approximately 100 Jews were living in Tiraspol, including 30 to 40 artisans brought from other ghettos to work for Romanian authorities. They were concentrated in a former hospital building, which became the Tiraspol ghetto. The building and its garden were enclosed by fencing and barbed wire. Additional deportees subsequently entered the city, and the population of the ghetto gradually increased to approximately 800 by 1943–1944.

Romanian authorities established sewing workshops, a shoemaker's workshop, a small soap factory and a barbershop in the ghetto. The prisoners developed an extensive system of communal assistance: workers contributed part of their earnings to a common fund that supported a communal kitchen, while a small clinic and dental service were established. Vegetables were cultivated in the former hospital garden, and the comparatively good sanitation prevented a major typhus epidemic. The ghetto also maintained a prayer room and obtained a Torah scroll and a shofar. Because conditions were better than at many other places of detention in Transnistria, Tiraspol became a refuge for some Jews who managed to transfer there from other ghettos and camps.

In addition to the ghetto, Romanian authorities operated several forced-labour facilities in Tiraspol. One workshop employed about 400 Jews repairing military uniforms, another employed approximately 100 Jews handling goods destined for Romania, and a vehicle-repair facility employed about 100 Jewish men brought from Mogilev. Several hundred Jewish prisoners were also held in the city's prison, including inmates transferred from the Slivina camp.

As the Red Army approached in March 1944, Romanian gendarmes issued permits allowing the ghetto inhabitants to leave. Between 17 and 19 March, the Jews of Tiraspol crossed the Dniester together with other deportees returning from southern Transnistria. After the Romanian withdrawal, German forces took control of the city and executed numerous prisoners in the local prison, including Jews. Soviet forces recaptured Tiraspol on 12 April 1944.

=== Post-secession ===
On 27 January 1990, the citizens in Tiraspol passed a referendum declaring the city as an independent territory. The nearby city of Bendery also declared its independence from Moldova. As the Russian-speaking independence movement gained momentum, some local governments banded together to resist pressure from the Moldovan government for nationalization.

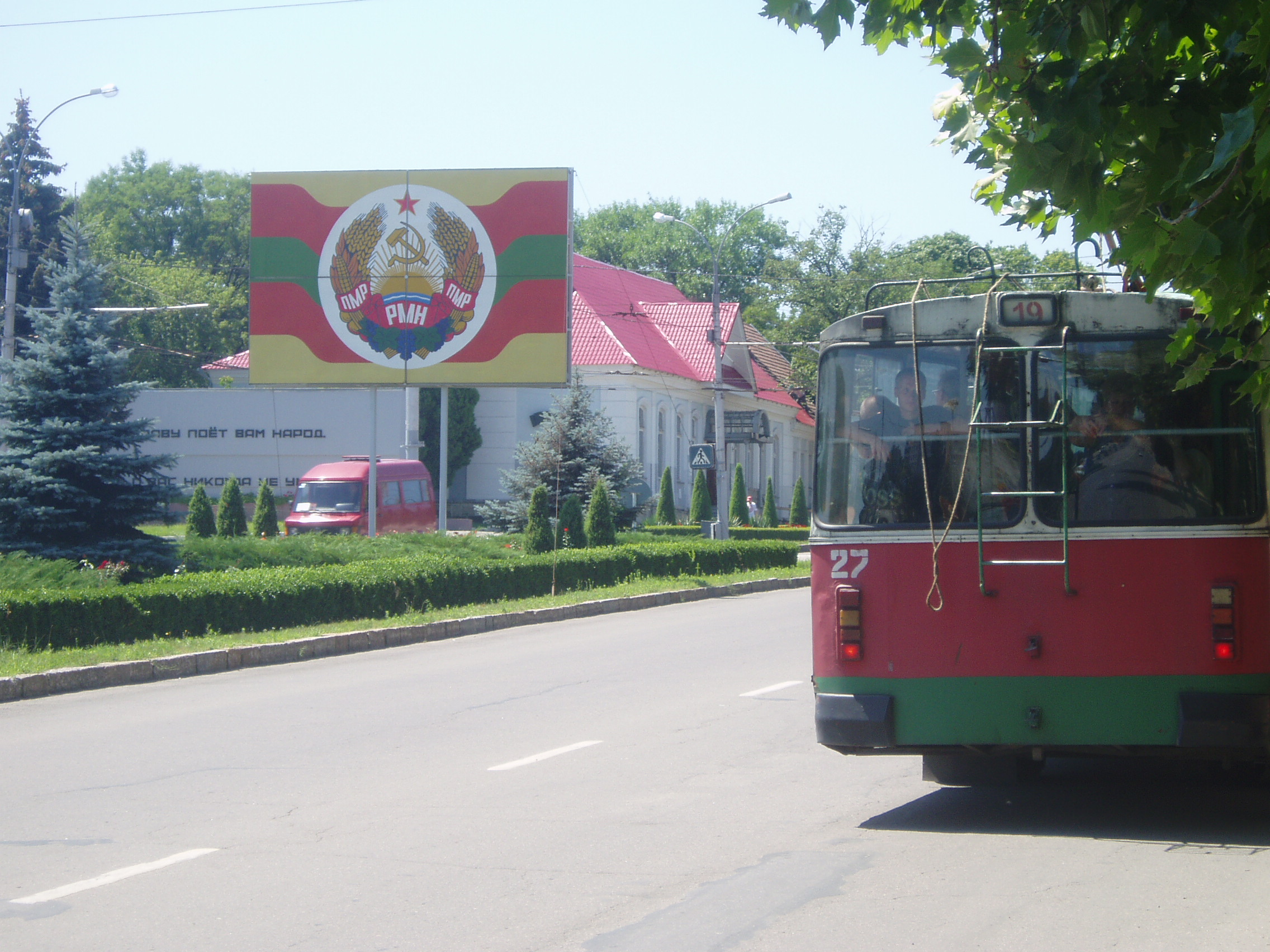
A trolleybus in Tiraspol painted in the colours of the Transnistrian flag

On 2 September 1990, Tiraspol was proclaimed the capital of the new Pridnestrovian Moldavian Soviet Socialist Republic. The new republic was not officially recognized by Soviet authorities; however, it received support from some important Soviet leaders, such as Anatoly Lukyanov. After the dissolution of the Soviet Union, the territory east of the Dniester River declared independence as the Pridnestrovian Moldavian Republic (PMR), with Tiraspol as its capital. It was not recognized by the international community.

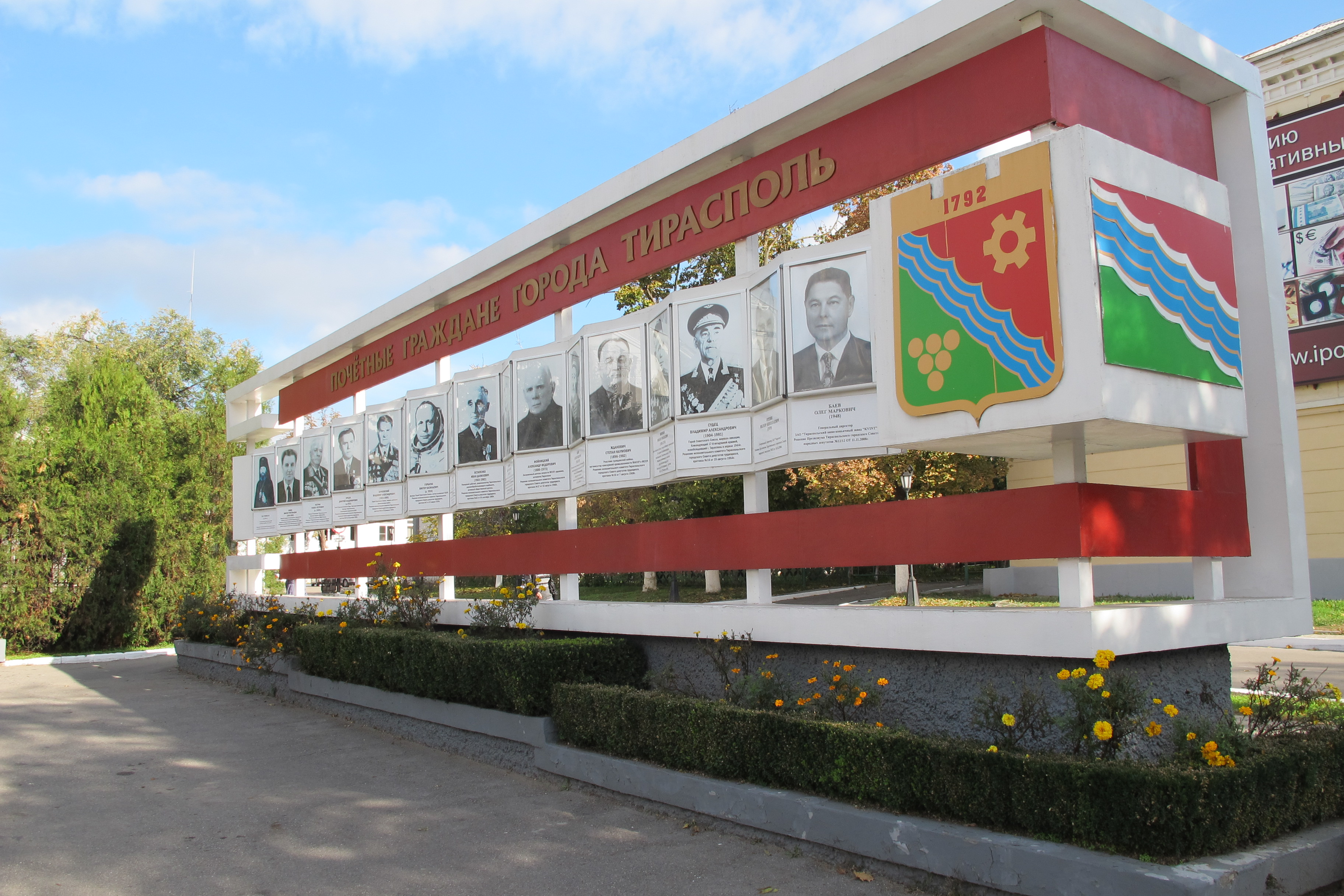
Heroes memorial in Tiraspol (2012)

On 1 July 2005, the Lucian Blaga Lyceum, a high school with Romanian as its language of instruction, was registered as a Transnistrian non-governmental establishment. The registration of six Romanian language schools has been the subject of negotiations with the government since 2000. The tension increased in the summer of 2004, when the Transnistrian authorities forcibly closed the schools that taught using the Latin script. According to the official PMR view, this is considered as Romanian. "Moldovan", written in the Cyrillic script, is one of the three official languages in the PMR; Romanian is not. Some economic measures and counter-measures were taken on both banks of the Dniester.

Tensions have been seen in terrorist incidents. On 6 July 2006, an explosion, believed to be caused by a bomb, killed at least eight people in a minibus. Later on 13 August, a grenade exploded in a trolleybus, killing two and injuring ten.

On 25 April 2022, during the Russian invasion of Ukraine, several explosions were reported near the Ministry of State Security (Transnistria) in Tiraspol. Firefighters were on the scene but there were no casualties.

On 17 March 2024, Transnistrian official press released a video allegedly showing a Mil Mi-8 helicopter in poor condition and likely not in use, not having been moved in over 13 years at the moment of the explosion, in a military unit in Tiraspol being attacked and destroyed by a kamikaze drone. No victims were reported. Transnistria claimed the drone had been launched from Ukraine from the direction of Odesa, more precisely from a bridge located 5–6 kilometres (3.1–3.7 miles) from the nearest border crossing between Transnistria and Ukraine. Ukraine immediately denied having anything to do with the incident. On the day of the incident, the Bureau for Reintegration of the Republic of Moldova called it an "attempt to provoke panic and fear in the region". Later, on 25 March, the bureau confirmed the explosion of the helicopter was not caused by a drone attack but by "other factors" and that the video contained "obvious elements of video montage". In the video, the drone disappears shortly before the explosion below the helicopter occurs. Reportedly, explosives placed under the helicopter were detonated remotely instead.

On 8 January 2025, during the 2025 Moldovan energy crisis, a woman in Tiraspol died from carbon monoxide poisoning after using a gas water heater to shower without having a chimney.

== Geography and climate ==
Tiraspol features a humid continental climate that closely borders an oceanic climate and has transitional features of the humid subtropical climate due to its warm summers. Summers are mild, with average monthly temperatures at around 21 °C (70 °F) in July and August. Winters are cold, with average temperatures in the coldest month (January) at −2.7 °C (27 °F). Precipitation is relatively evenly spread throughout the year, though there is a noticeable increase in monthly precipitation in June and July. Tiraspol on average sees nearly 500 mm (20 in) of precipitation per year.

Climate data for Tiraspol (1991–2020, extremes 1935–present)
Month	Jan	Feb	Mar	Apr	May	Jun	Jul	Aug	Sep	Oct	Nov	Dec	Year
Record high °C (°F)	17.4 (63.3)	23.3 (73.9)	27.3 (81.1)	32.3 (90.1)	36.9 (98.4)	39.1 (102.4)	41.0 (105.8)	40.5 (104.9)	38.5 (101.3)	33.3 (91.9)	25.3 (77.5)	18.3 (64.9)	41.0 (105.8)
Mean daily maximum °C (°F)	1.8 (35.2)	4.7 (40.5)	10.6 (51.1)	17.7 (63.9)	23.6 (74.5)	27.6 (81.7)	30.3 (86.5)	29.9 (85.8)	23.8 (74.8)	16.5 (61.7)	9.2 (48.6)	3.3 (37.9)	16.6 (61.9)
Daily mean °C (°F)	−1.8 (28.8)	−0.2 (31.6)	4.5 (40.1)	10.9 (51.6)	16.7 (62.1)	20.9 (69.6)	23.2 (73.8)	22.7 (72.9)	17.0 (62.6)	10.7 (51.3)	4.9 (40.8)	−0.1 (31.8)	10.8 (51.4)
Mean daily minimum °C (°F)	−5.2 (22.6)	−4.1 (24.6)	−0.5 (31.1)	4.6 (40.3)	9.9 (49.8)	14.4 (57.9)	16.3 (61.3)	15.7 (60.3)	10.8 (51.4)	5.6 (42.1)	1.3 (34.3)	−3.3 (26.1)	5.5 (41.9)
Record low °C (°F)	−29.4 (−20.9)	−29.6 (−21.3)	−19.9 (−3.8)	−8.5 (16.7)	−2.7 (27.1)	3.3 (37.9)	8.0 (46.4)	5.0 (41.0)	−4.6 (23.7)	−9.2 (15.4)	−16.3 (2.7)	−25.1 (−13.2)	−29.6 (−21.3)
Average precipitation mm (inches)	35 (1.4)	27 (1.1)	30 (1.2)	31 (1.2)	47 (1.9)	66 (2.6)	57 (2.2)	48 (1.9)	49 (1.9)	39 (1.5)	38 (1.5)	33 (1.3)	500 (19.7)
Average precipitation days (≥ 1.0 mm)	6	5	6	5	7	7	6	4	5	5	5	6	69
Average relative humidity (%)	83	81	76	66	64	66	65	65	71	76	83	85	73
Mean monthly sunshine hours	60	88	146	206	281	301	324	306	215	153	73	52	2,224
Source 1: NOAA
Source 2: Serviciul Hidrometeorologic de Stat (extremes, relative humidity)

== Demographics ==
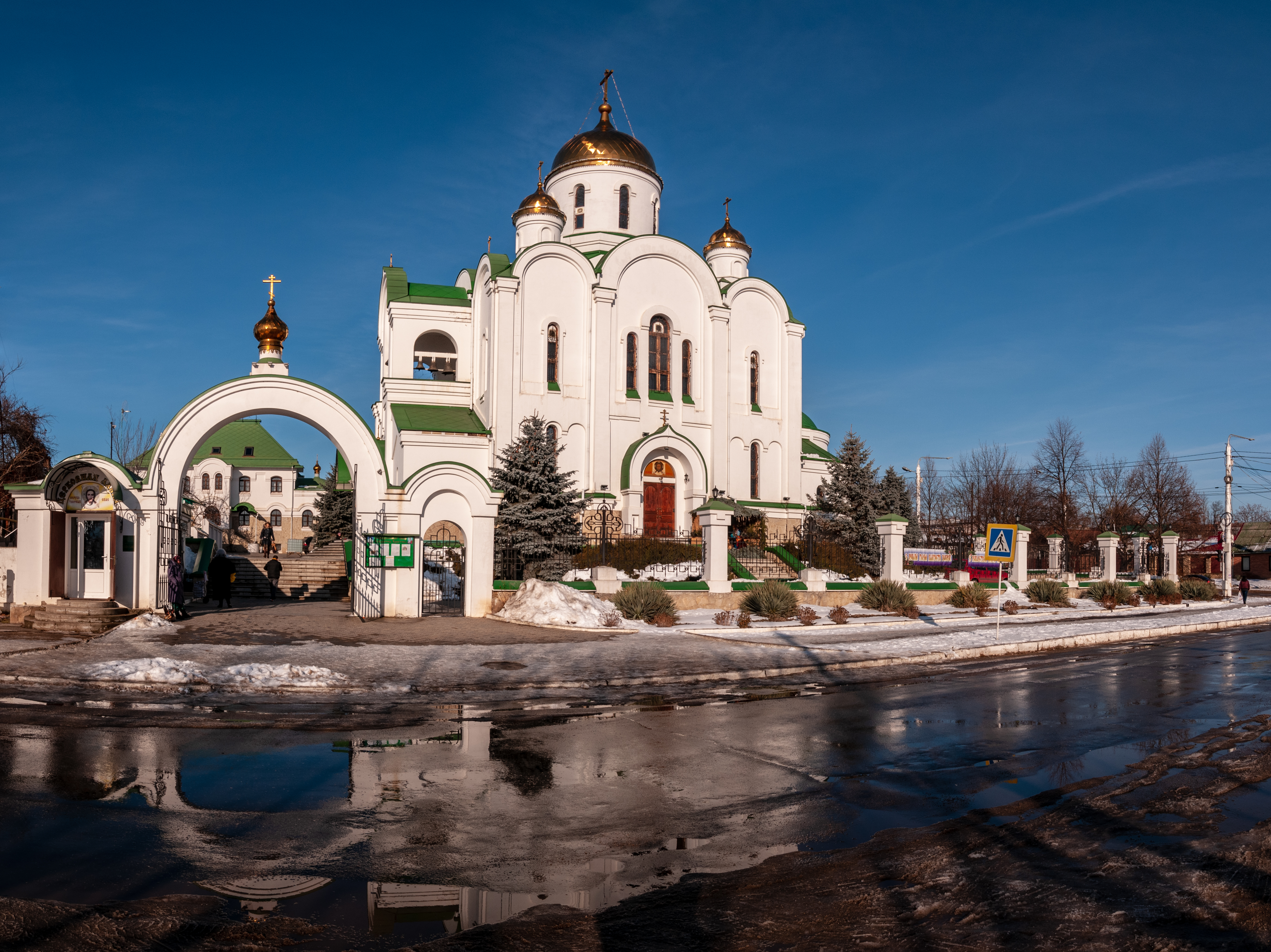
Church of the Nativity in Shevchenko Street

=== Population ===
Historical population
Year	Pop.
1870	16,692
1926 (est.)	29,700
1939	43,676
2004	158,069

The population of the city was about 190,000 in 1989 and about 203,000 in 1992. 41% were Russians, 32% Ukrainians (both Eastern Slavic) and 18% were Moldovans (Romanians).

As result of the political and economic situation that followed the proclamation of the independent (unrecognized) Transnistria, as well as large Jewish emigration in the early 1990s, the population of the city fell below its 1989 number and the 2004 Transnistrian census put its population at 158,069. In 1897, 31,616 people lived in the city of Tiraspol, who were classified, by language, in the following way:

Native language	Population	share of population
Russian	14,013	44.32%
Yiddish	8,568	27.1%
Ukrainian	3,708	11.73%
Romanian	3,611	11.42%
Polish	1,003	3.17%
Belarusian	119	0.38%
Bulgarian	56	0.18%
Lithuanian	7	0.02%
Latvian	7	0.02%
Czech	1	0.003%

In 1926, 29,700 people lived in the city of Tiraspol who were classified, by ethnicity, as follows:

Ethnic group	Population	% total share
Russian	16,276	54.8%
Hebrew	8,732	29.4%
Ukrainian	4,277	14.4%
Moldovan (Romanians)	416	1.4%

According to the Soviet census of 1939, the city's population was 43,676 inhabitants, distributed as follows:

Ethnic group	Population	% Total share
Russian	14,785	33.85%
Ukrainian	12,504	28.63%
Hebrew	11,764	26.93%
Moldovan (Romanian)	3,480	7.97%

2004

Ethnic group	Population	% Total share
Russian	65,298	41.71%
Ukrainian	52,278	33.07%
Moldovan (Romanian)	23,790	15.05%
Bulgarian	2,450	1.55%
Gagauz	1,988	1.26%
Belarusian	1,712	1.08%
German	701	0.44%
Hebrew	573	0.36%
Armenian	360	0.23%
Polish	324	0.2%
Romani/Rromi	116	0.07%
Others	7,849	4.98%

=== Religion ===
The Latin Catholic minority is served by the Catholic Diocese of Chișinău.

In the fourteenth century, Tiraspol was the see city of the diocese of Kherson; in 1848, a Catholic Diocese of Tiraspol was erected with its see in Saratov. Since 1993, it did not cover any Moldovan territory, not even Tiraspol. The diocese was suppressed in 2002.

== Culture ==
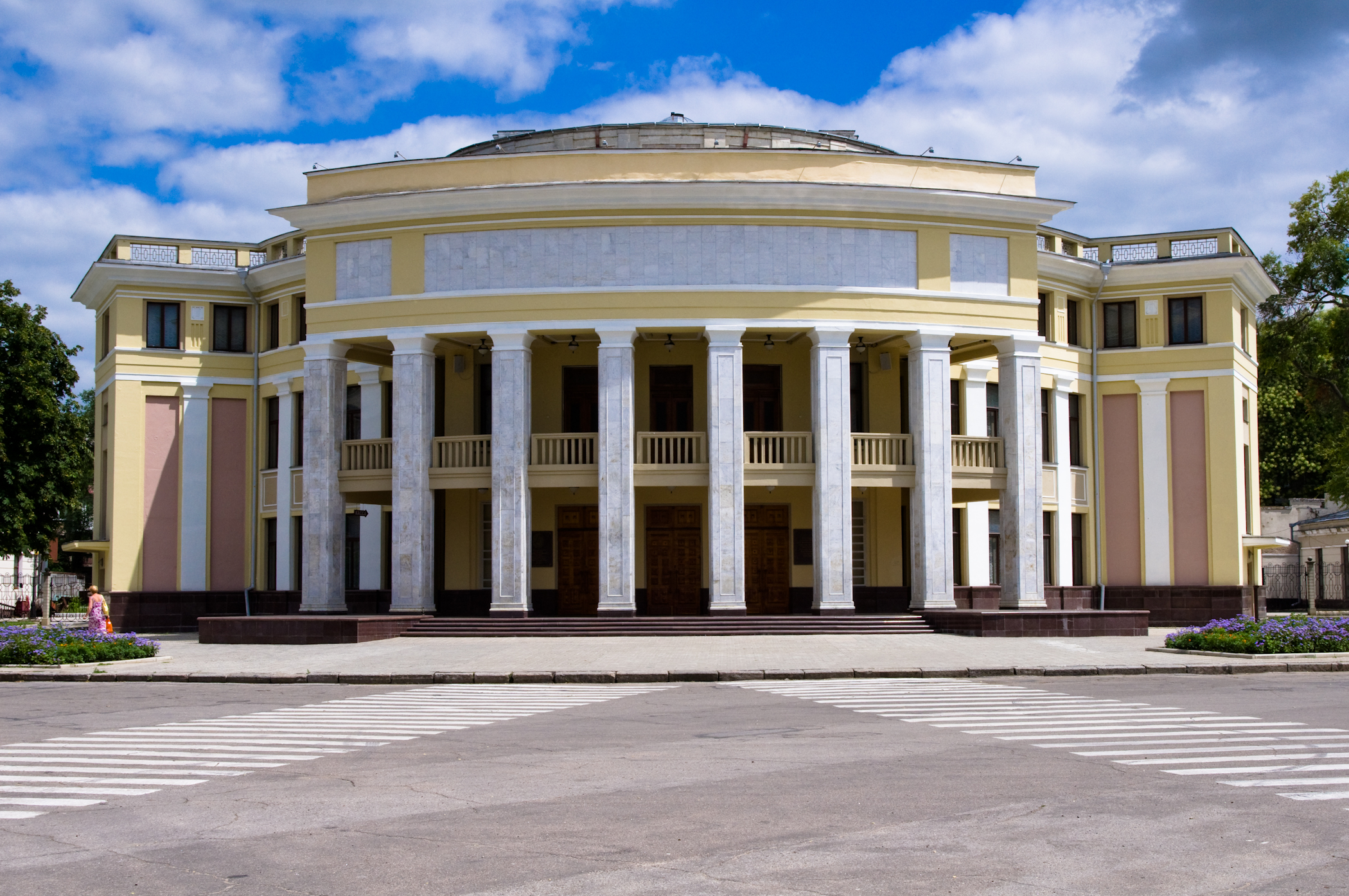
Tiraspol Drama Theater

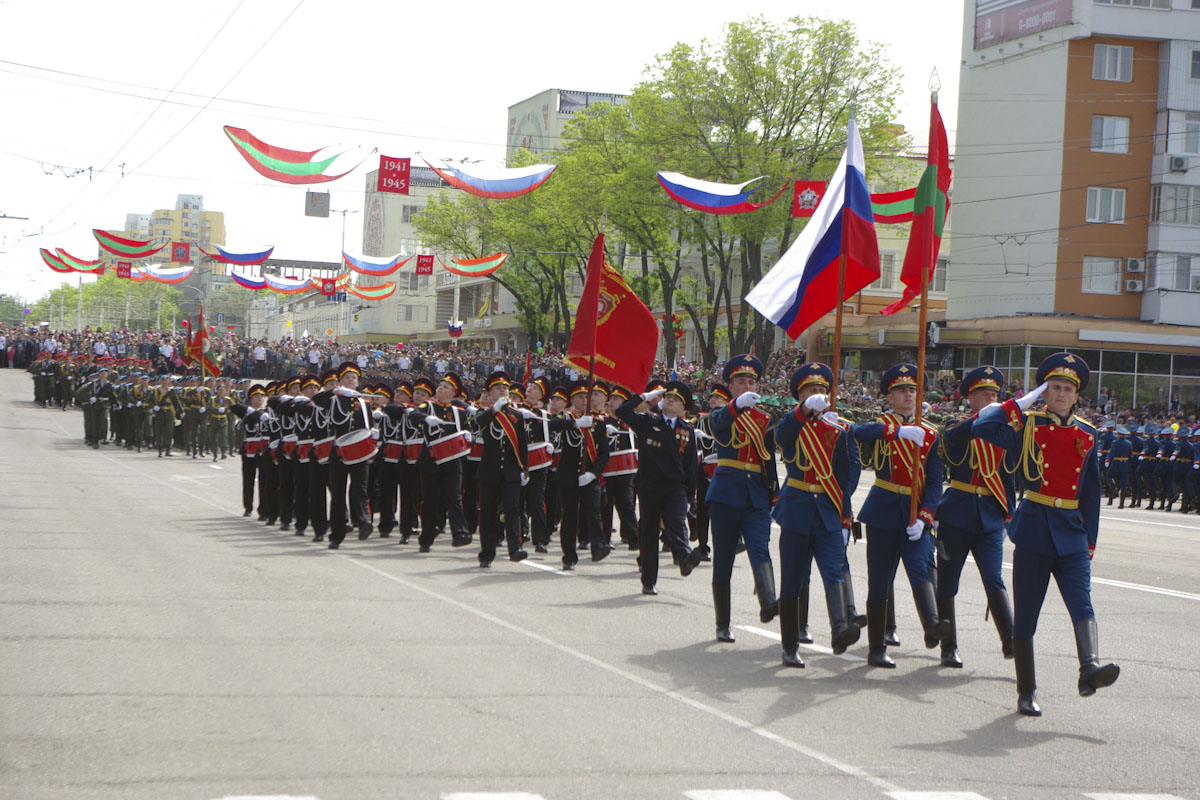
Victory Day in Tiraspol, 2017

The statue of Alexander Suvorov was erected in the central square in 1979 in commemoration of his 250th anniversary. In front of the Transnistrian government building there is a statue of Vladimir Lenin. On the opposite side of the central square, a monument plaza features a Soviet T-34 tank, commemorating the Soviet victory in World War II, an eternal flame to those who died defending the city in 1941 and recapturing it in 1944, as well as several monuments dedicated to more recent conflicts, including the Soviet–Afghan War and the War of Transnistria.

== Sport ==
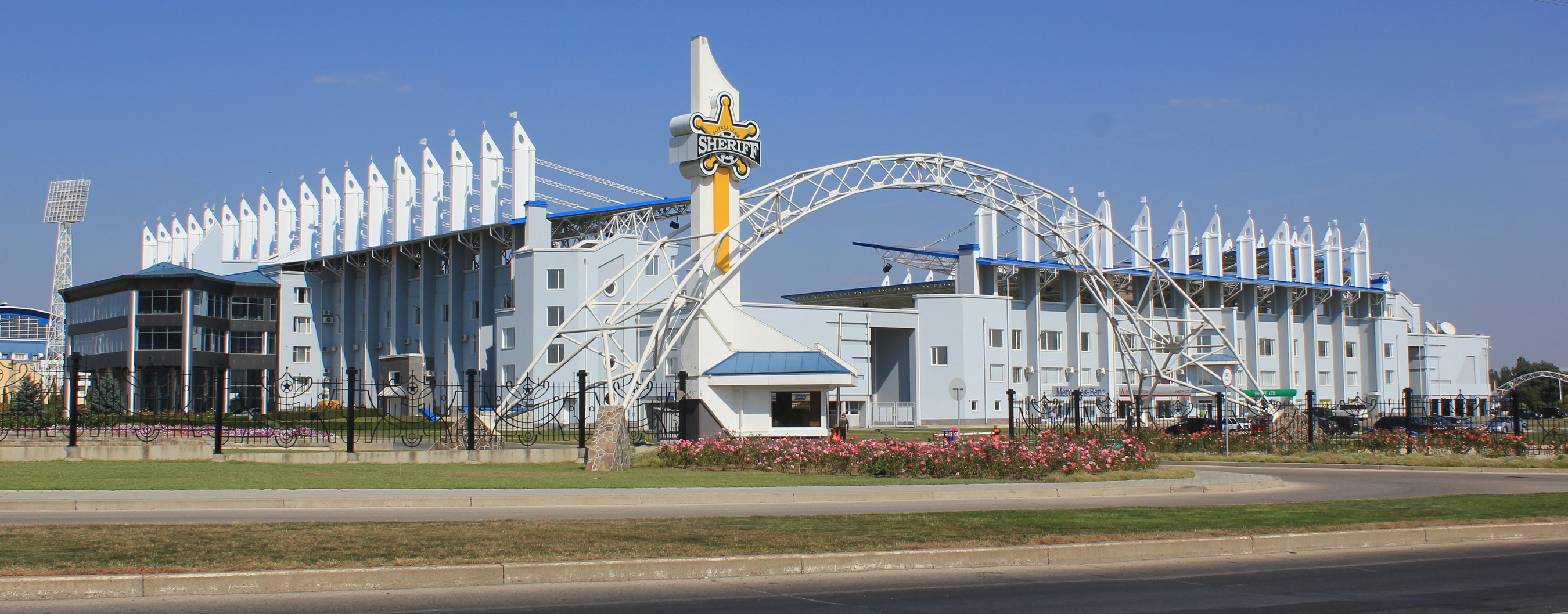
Sheriff Arena

The two main football clubs are Sheriff Tiraspol and FC Tiraspol. Sheriff is the most successful Moldovan football club of recent history, winning 14 league titles since the 2000–2001 season, and 6 Moldovan Cups. The team gained world notoriety for their last-minute 2–1 victory during the 2021–22 UEFA Champions League edition against later tournament winners Real Madrid on 28 September 2021. A third club, CS Tiligul-Tiras Tiraspol, withdrew from competition prior to the 2009–2010 season. Tiraspol is home to the Sheriff Stadium, the largest capacity stadium in the region, with a capacity of 14,300 seats.

== Twin towns and sister cities ==
- Bălți, Moldova
- Comrat, Moldova
- Trondheim, Norway (2000)
- Volgograd, Russia
- Kaluga, Russia
- Kursk, Russia
- Obninsk, Russia
- Severodvinsk, Russia
- Novosibirsk, Russia
- Mykolaiv, Ukraine
- Kherson, Ukraine
- Cherkasy, Ukraine
- Ternopil, Ukraine
- Ashdod, Israel
- Leninsky District, Minsk, Belarus
- Sokhumi, Abkhazia
- Tskhinvali, South Ossetia
- Santarem, Portugal

== Notable people ==
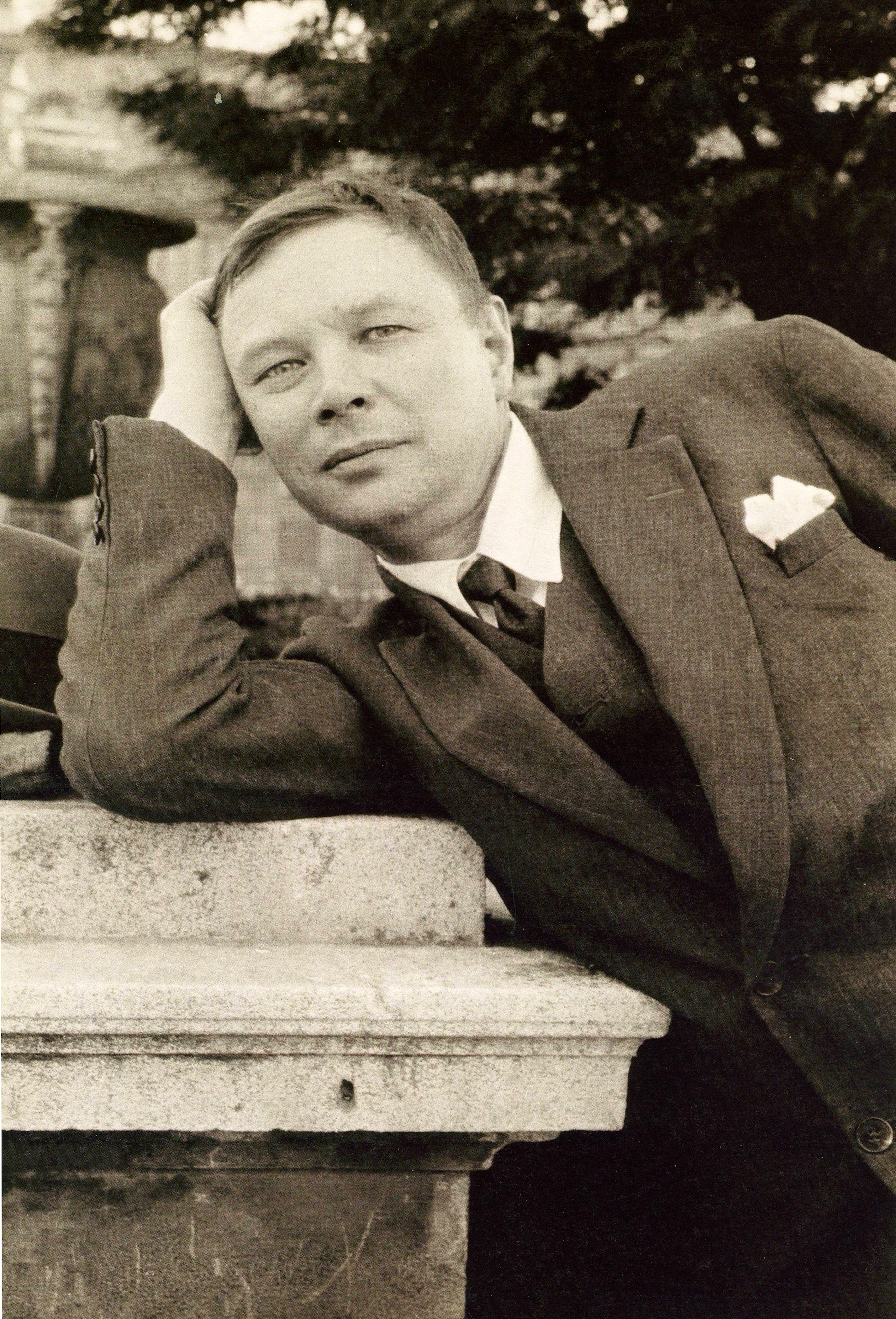
Mikhail Larionov, 1917

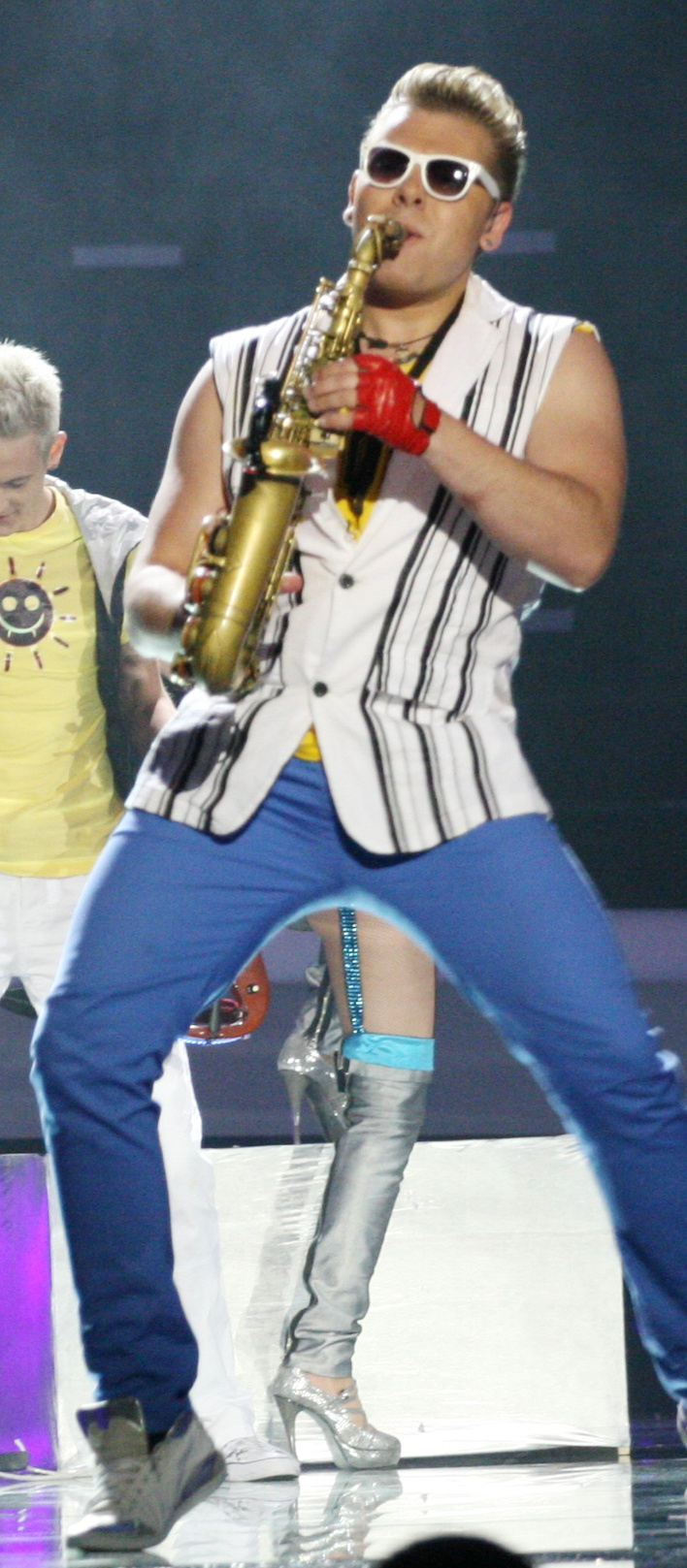
Sergey Stepanov, 2010. He is widely known online as epic sax guy

- Yuri Avvakumov (born 1957), Russian architect, artist, and curator
- Nikolay Zelinsky (1861–1953), Russian and Soviet chemist who invented the first filtering activated charcoal gas mask
- Georgi Stamatov (1869–1942), Bulgarian writer
- Mikhail Larionov (1881–1964), Russian avant-garde painter
- Abraham Rabinovitch (1889–1964), Australian-Russian property developer and pioneer of the Sydney Modern Orthodox Jewish community
- Gheorghe Pintilie (1902–1985), Soviet intelligence agent, Russian citizen and naturalised Romanian communist activist of Ukrainian origin, the first Director of the Securitate
- Izrail Shmurun (1912–1985), Moldavian Soviet architect
- Larisa Eryomina (born 1950), stage and screen actress
- Oxana Ionova (born 1966), head of the state tax service of Transnistria and director of Transnistria's central bank from 2008 to 2011
- Vlad Stashevsky (born 1974), Russian pop singer
- Berenika Glixman (born 1984), Israeli classical pianist
- Sergey Stepanov (born 1984), musician and composer, member of the SunStroke Project
- Valeria Lukyanova (born 1985), Ukrainian model, famous for her resemblance to a Barbie doll, lives in Moscow
- Anton Turkul (1892–1957), Russian Imperial Army officer

=== Politics ===
- Serhii Kivalov (born 1954), Ukrainian politician, jurist, parliamentarian, head of Central Election Commission
- Vladimir Mikhailovich Belyaev (born 1965), the minister of information and telecommunications
- Maya Parnas (born 1974), politician and was the former acting Prime Minister of Transnistria
- Nina Shtanski (born 1977), former Transnistrian state politician, the Minister of Foreign Affairs 2012 to 2015
- Roman Khudyakov (born 1977), Russian politician, chairman of the Liberal Democratic Party of Transnistria
- Vladimir Yastrebchak (born 1979), the Minister of Foreign Affairs of Transnistria from 2008 to 2012.
- Olga Paterova (born in 1984), politician, the press secretary for the political youth organization Breakthrough
- Yury Cheban, Transnistrian Minister of Natural Resources and Ecological Control

=== Sport ===
- Constantin Nour (1906 or 1907 – 1986), Romanian champion middleweight boxer and national team trainer
- Larisa Popova (born 1957), rower who competed for the Soviet Union in the 1976 Summer Olympics
- Igor Samoilenco (born 1977), boxer
- Andrei Mihailov (born 1980), backstroke swimmer, competed in the 2000 and the 2004 Summer Olympics
- Andrei Corneencov (born 1982), Moldovan international footballer.
- Stanislau Tsivonchyk (born 1985), Belarusian pole vaulter, competed in the pole vault at the 2012 Summer Olympics
- Vitalie Bulat (born 1987), footballer
- Oleksandr Kolchenko (born 1988), Ukrainian basketball player
- Dănilă Artiomov (born 1994), breaststroke swimmer
- Artur Dalaloyan (born 1996), Russian artistic gymnast of Armenian origin

== Gallery ==
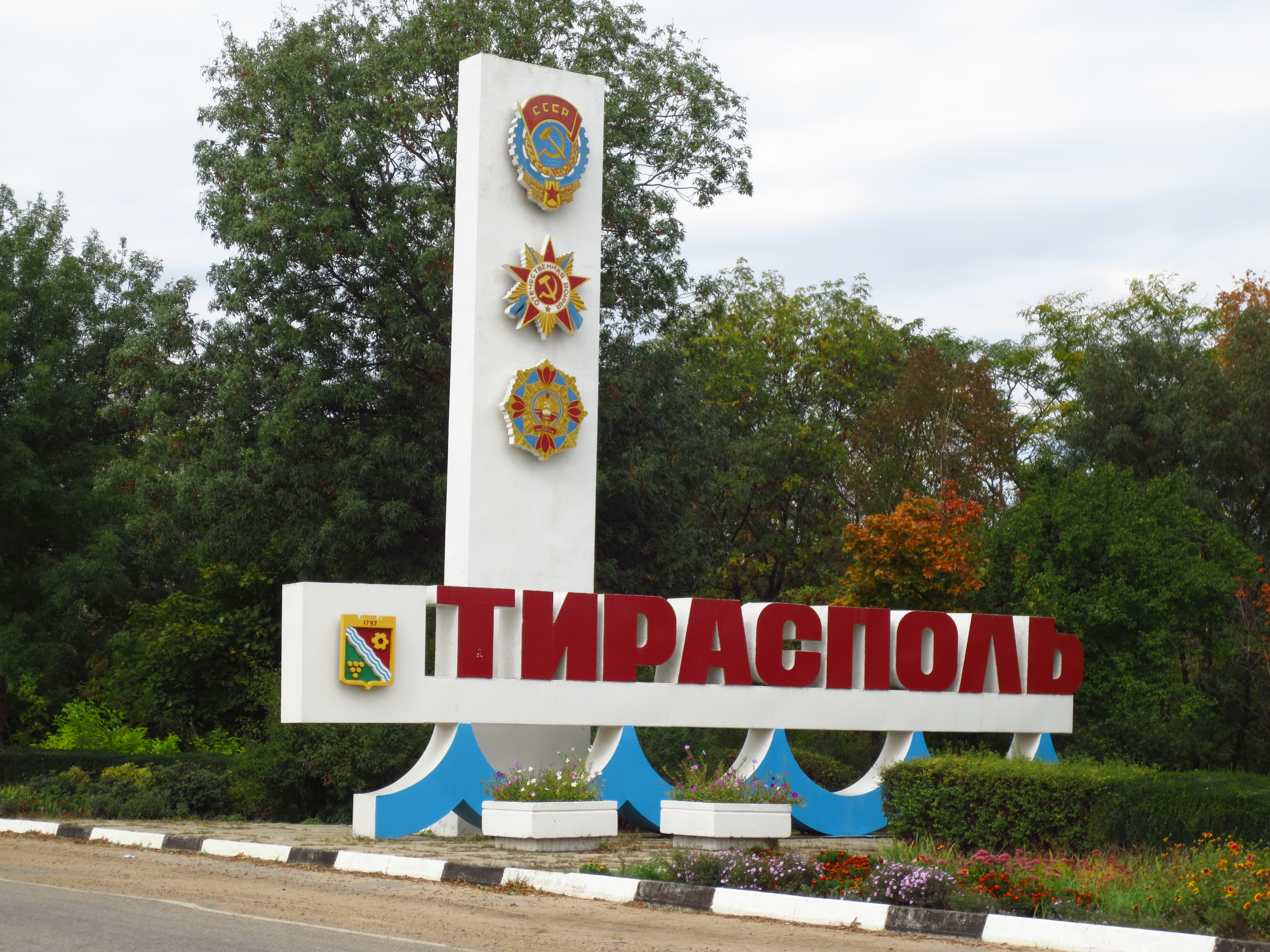
Sign at the entrance to Tiraspol

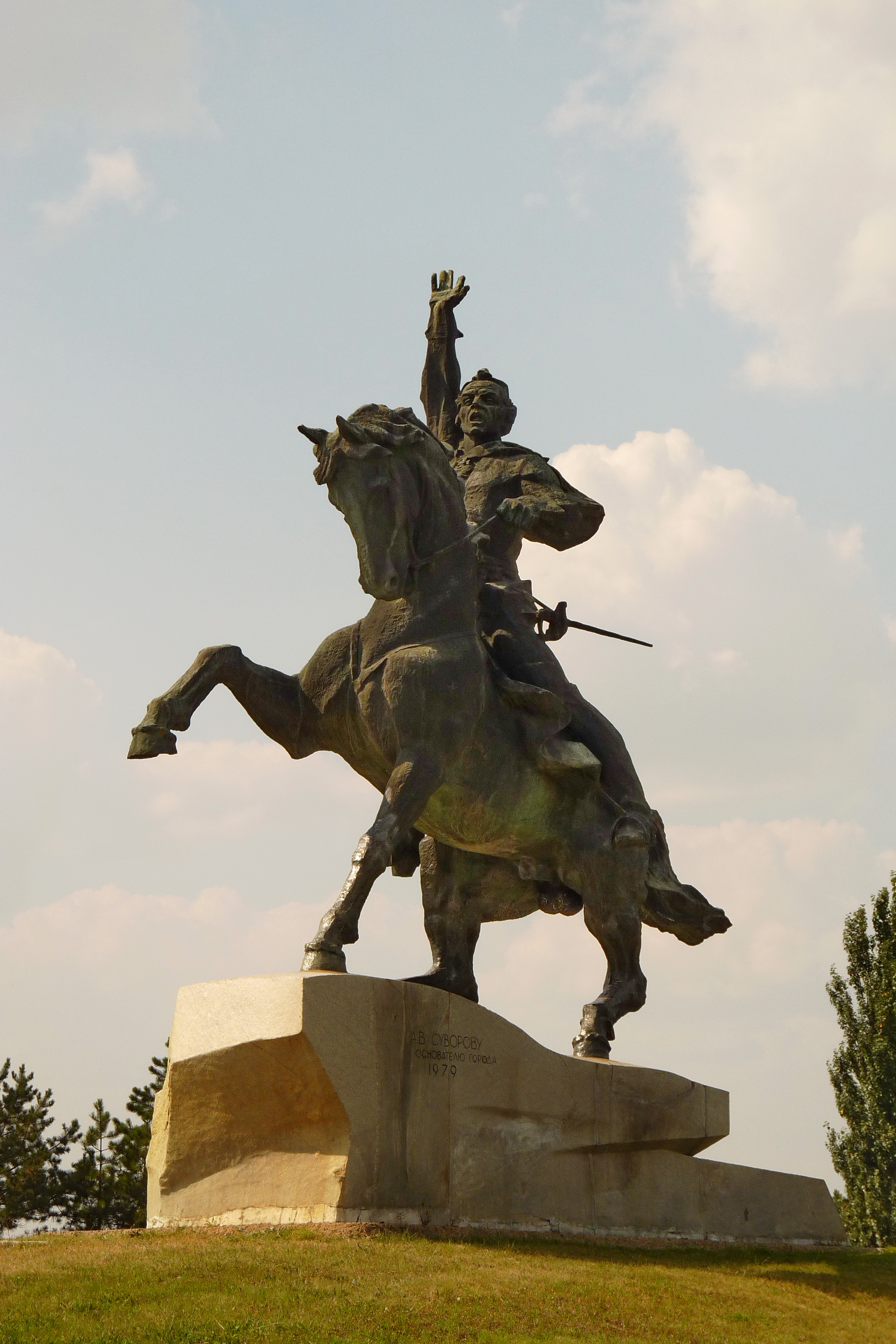
Statue of Alexander Suvorov at Suvorov Square

A street in central Tiraspol

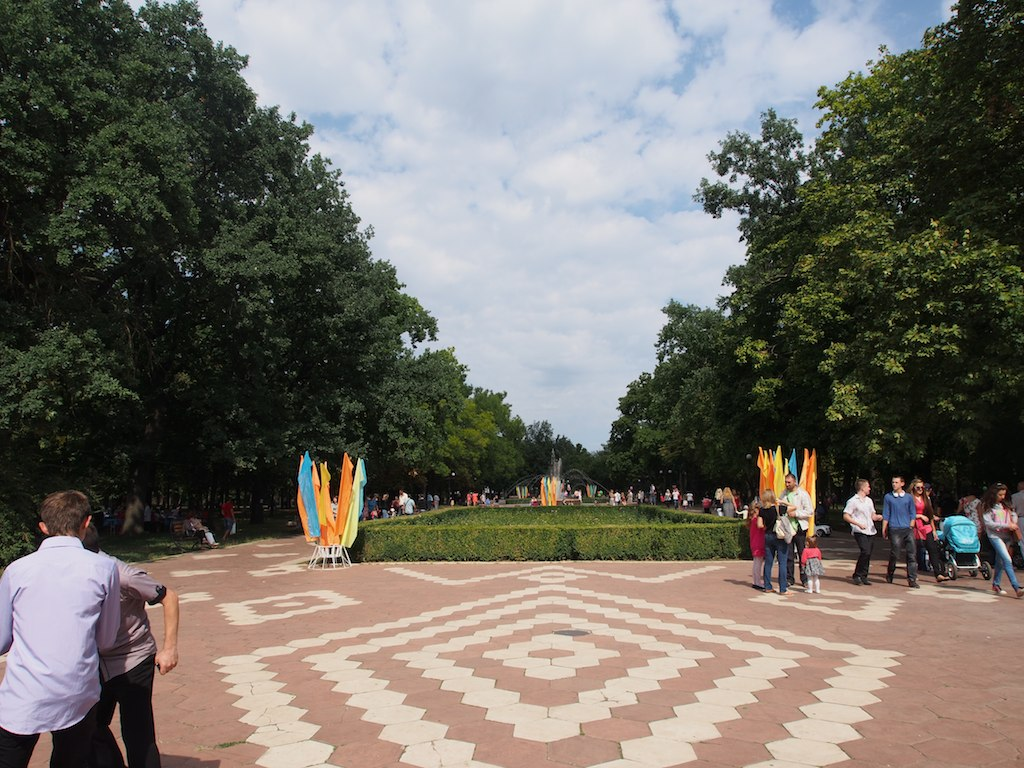
The Victory Park

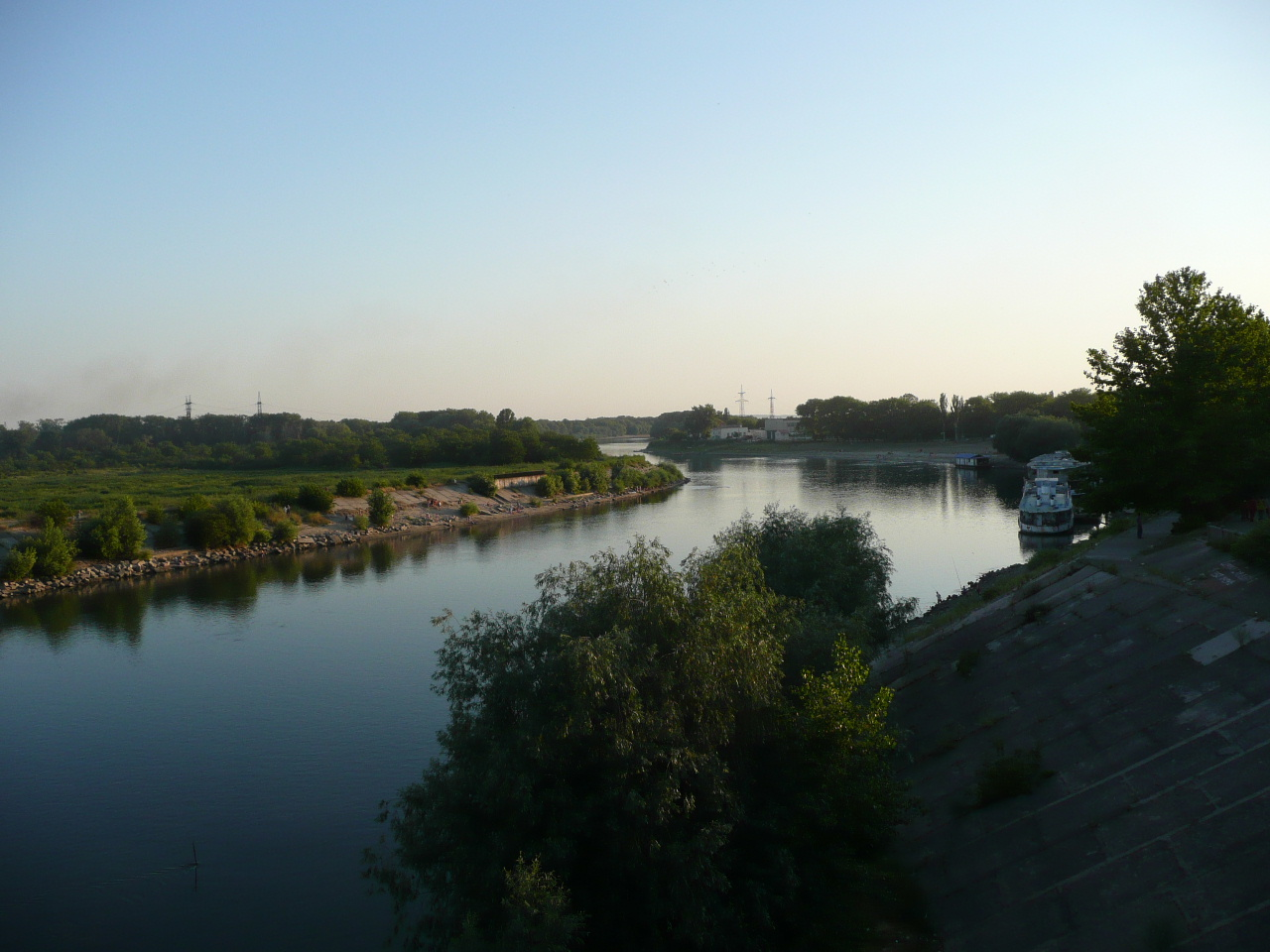
The Dnestr river passing through Tiraspol

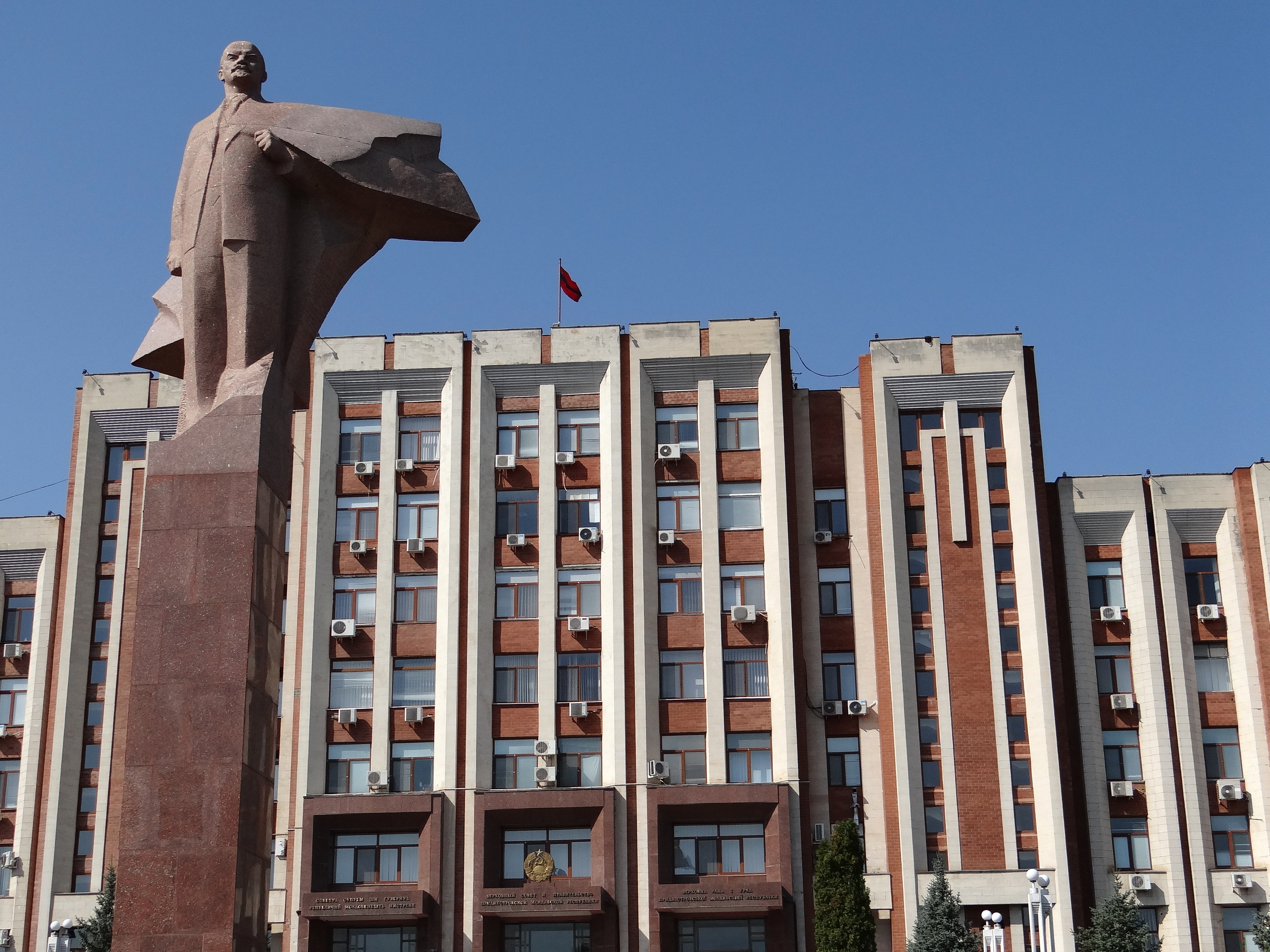
The statue of Lenin in front of the parliament building

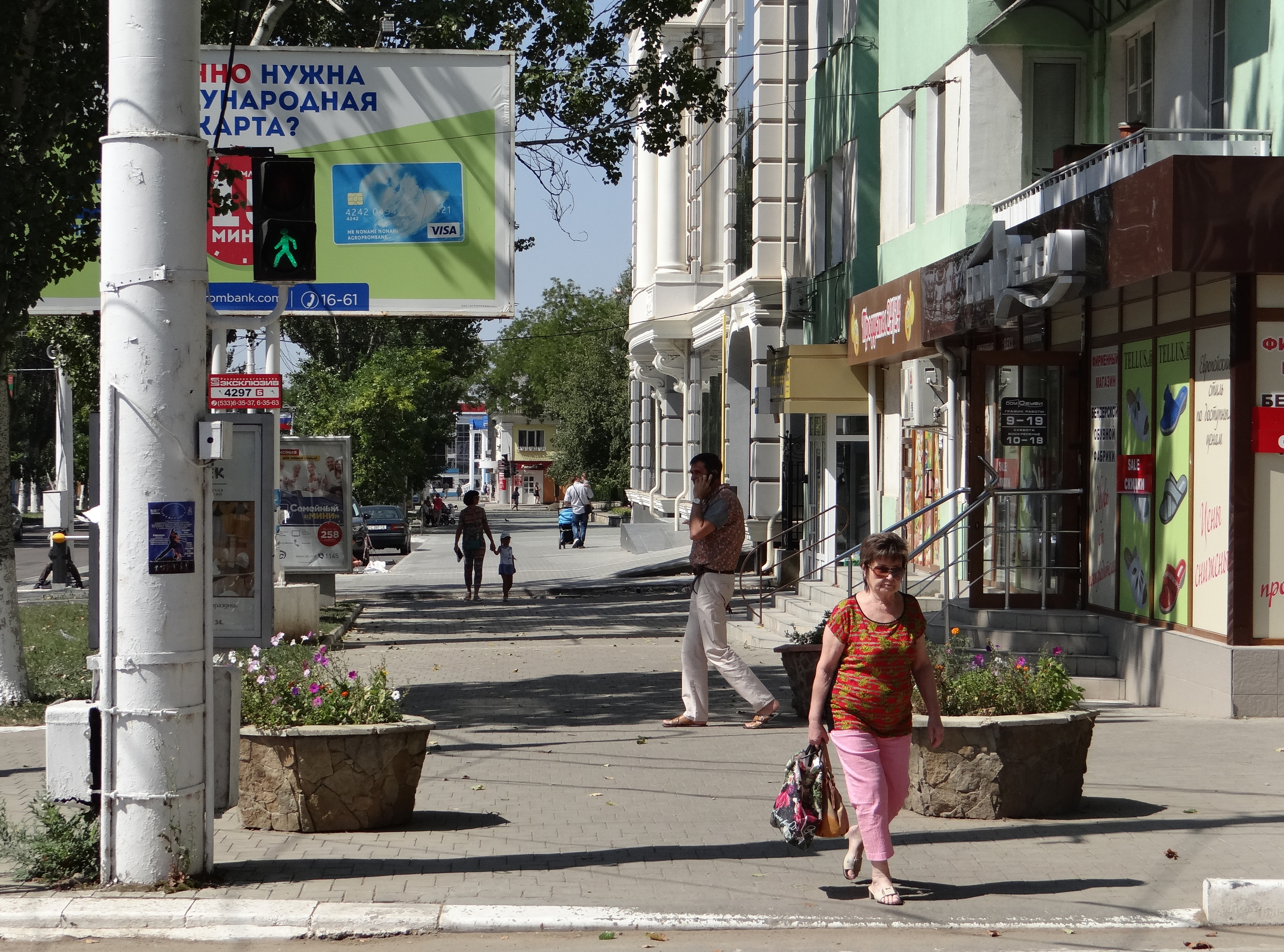
Street scene

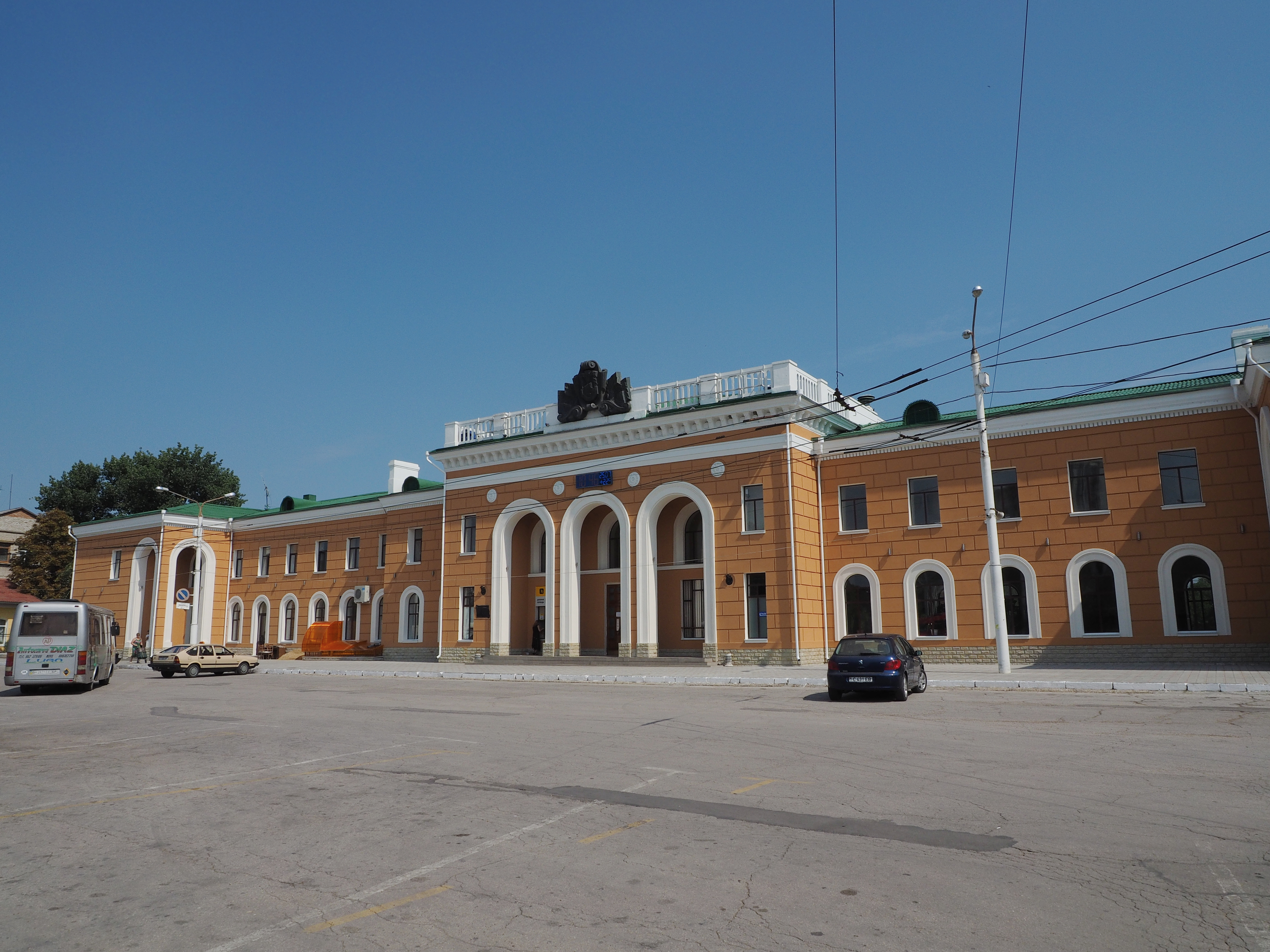
Railway station

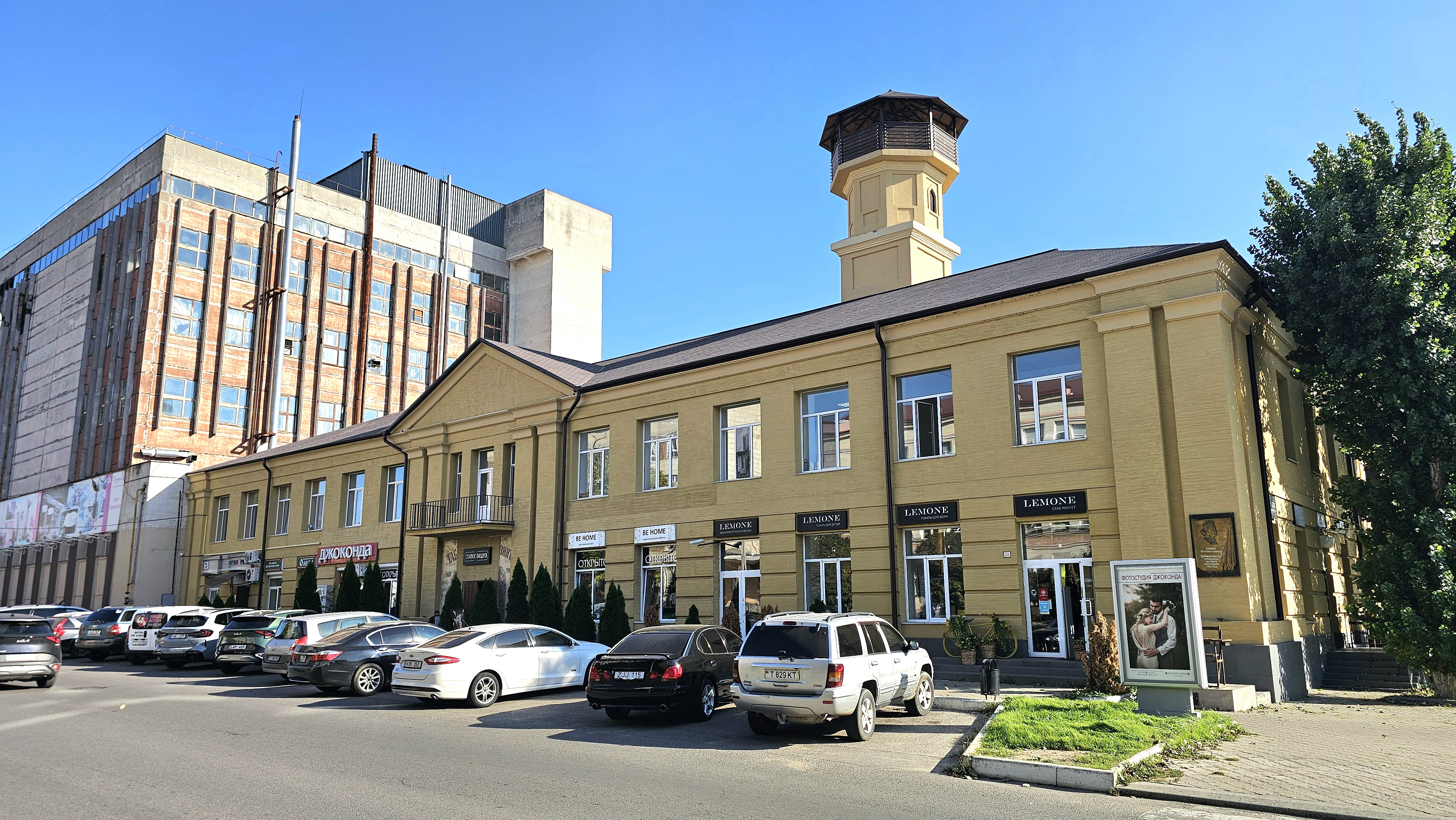
Trade union building and fire station

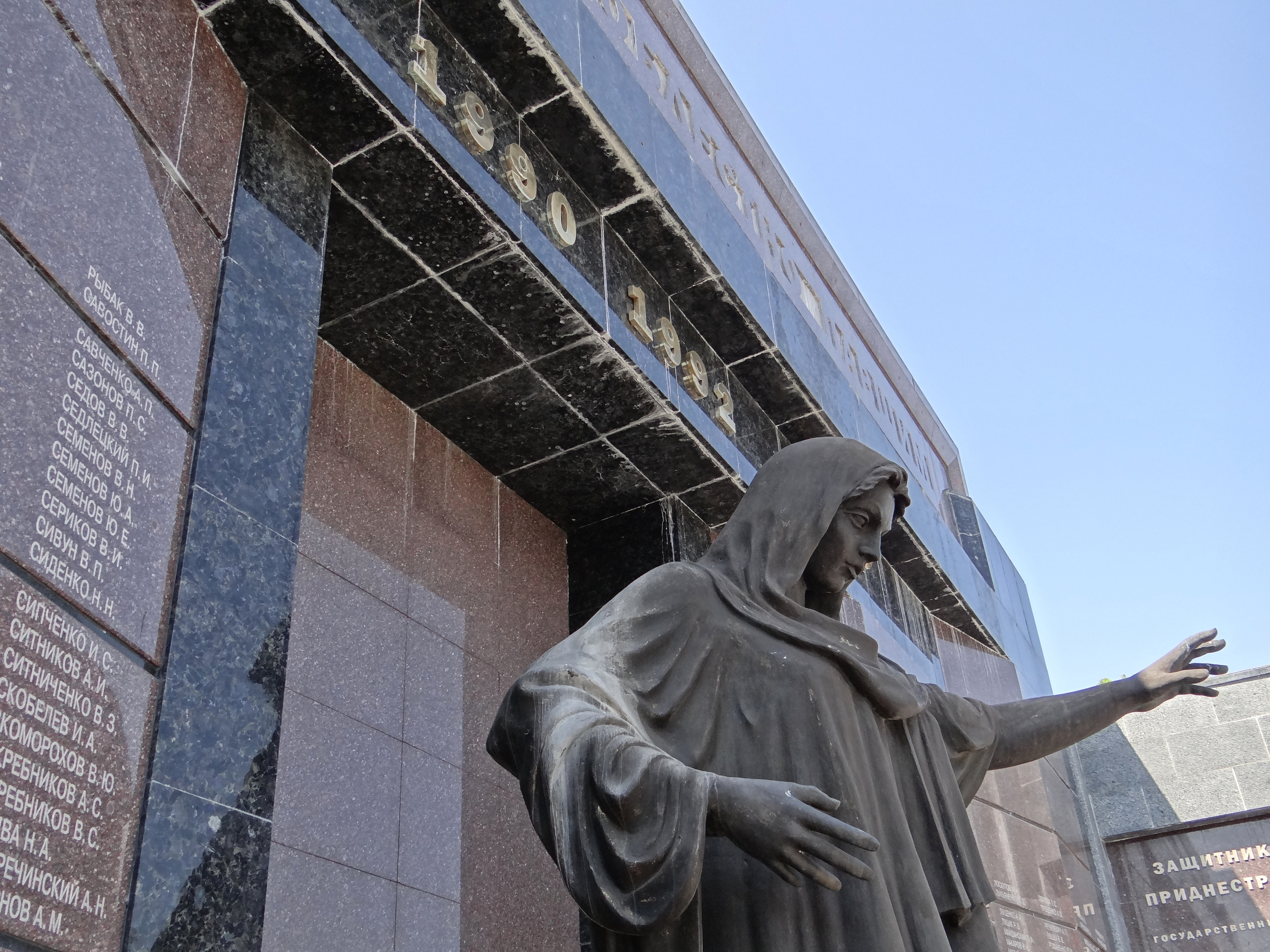
War memorial and the Tomb of the Unknown Soldier

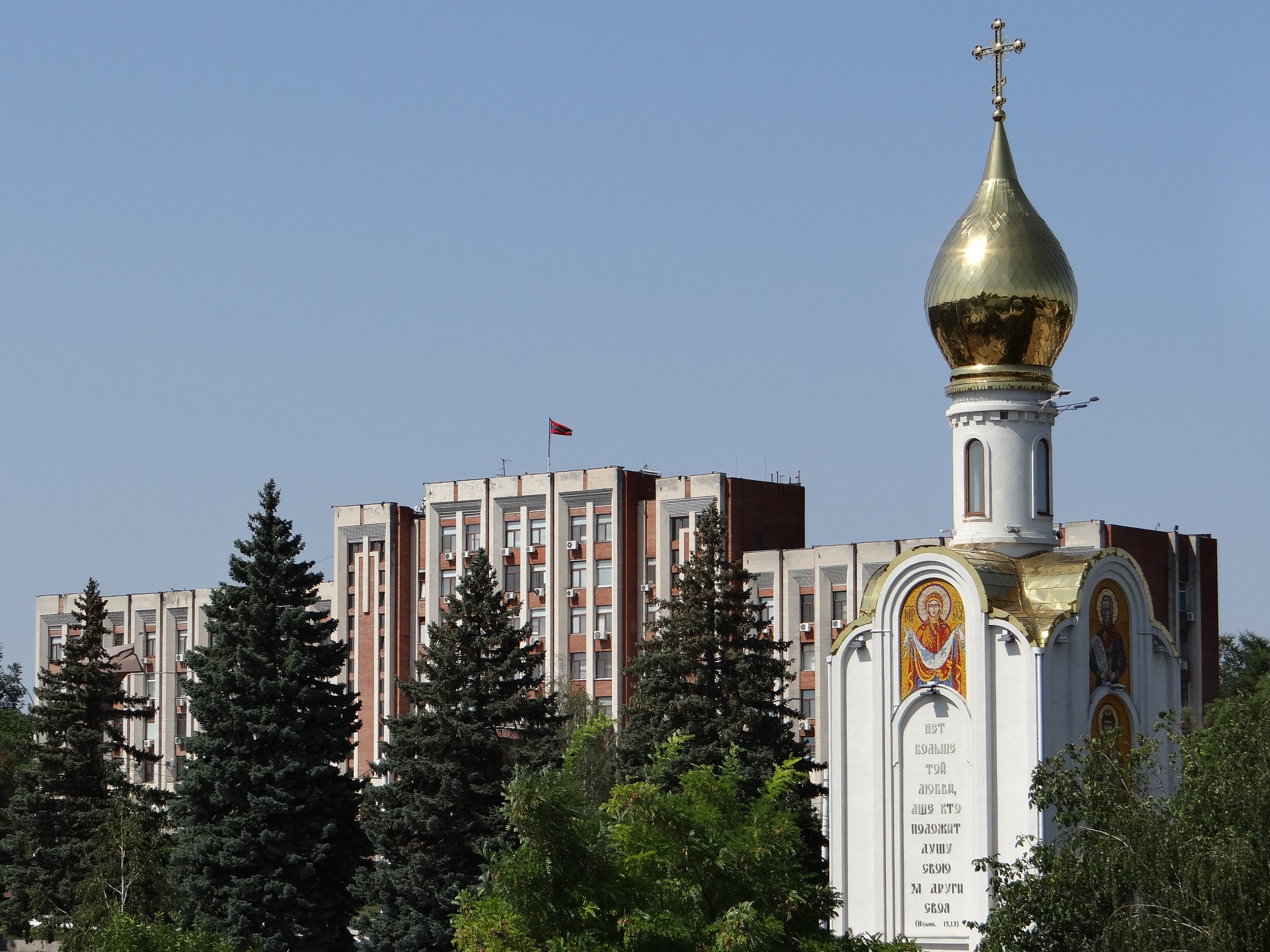
Part of the city centre

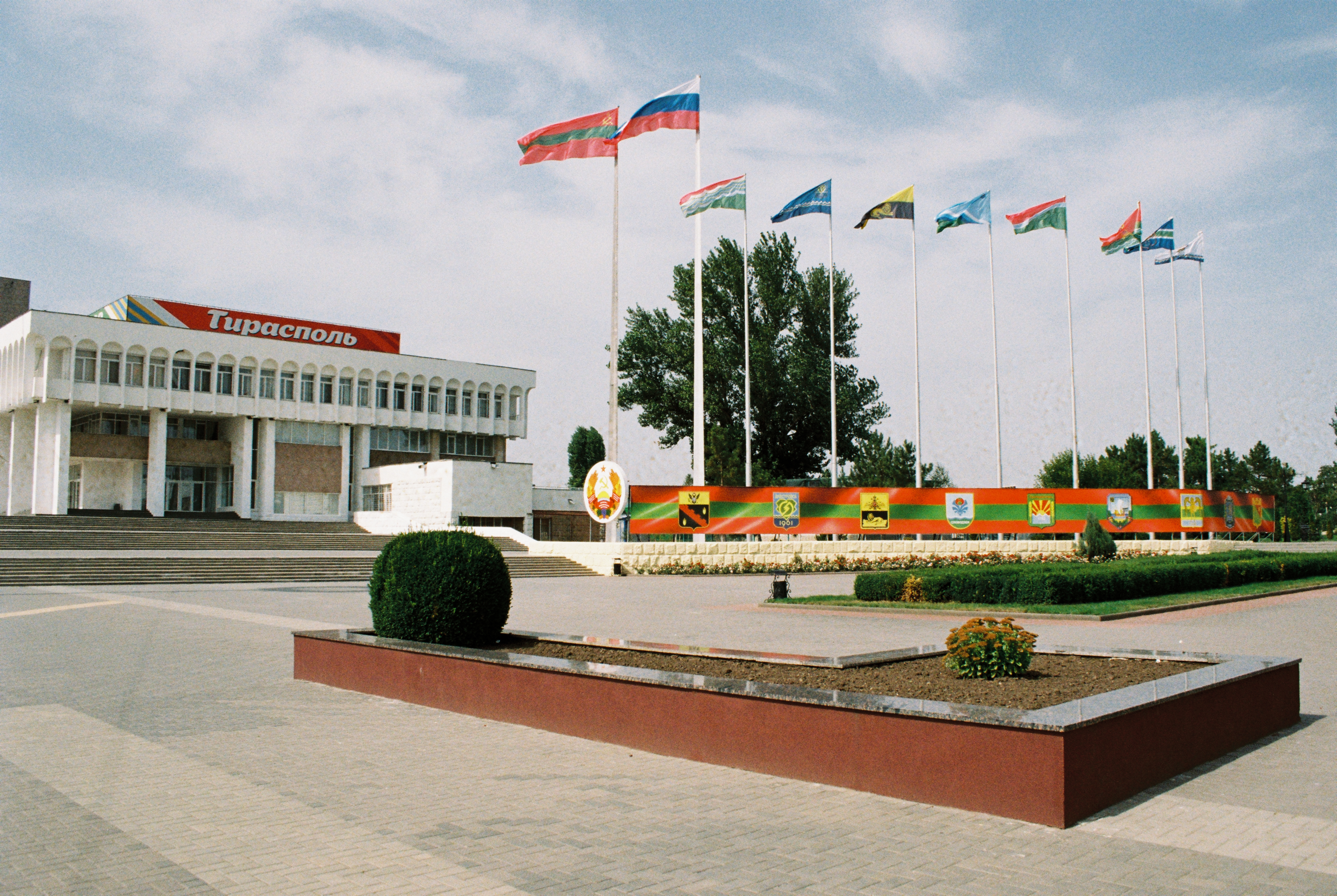
Suvorov Square

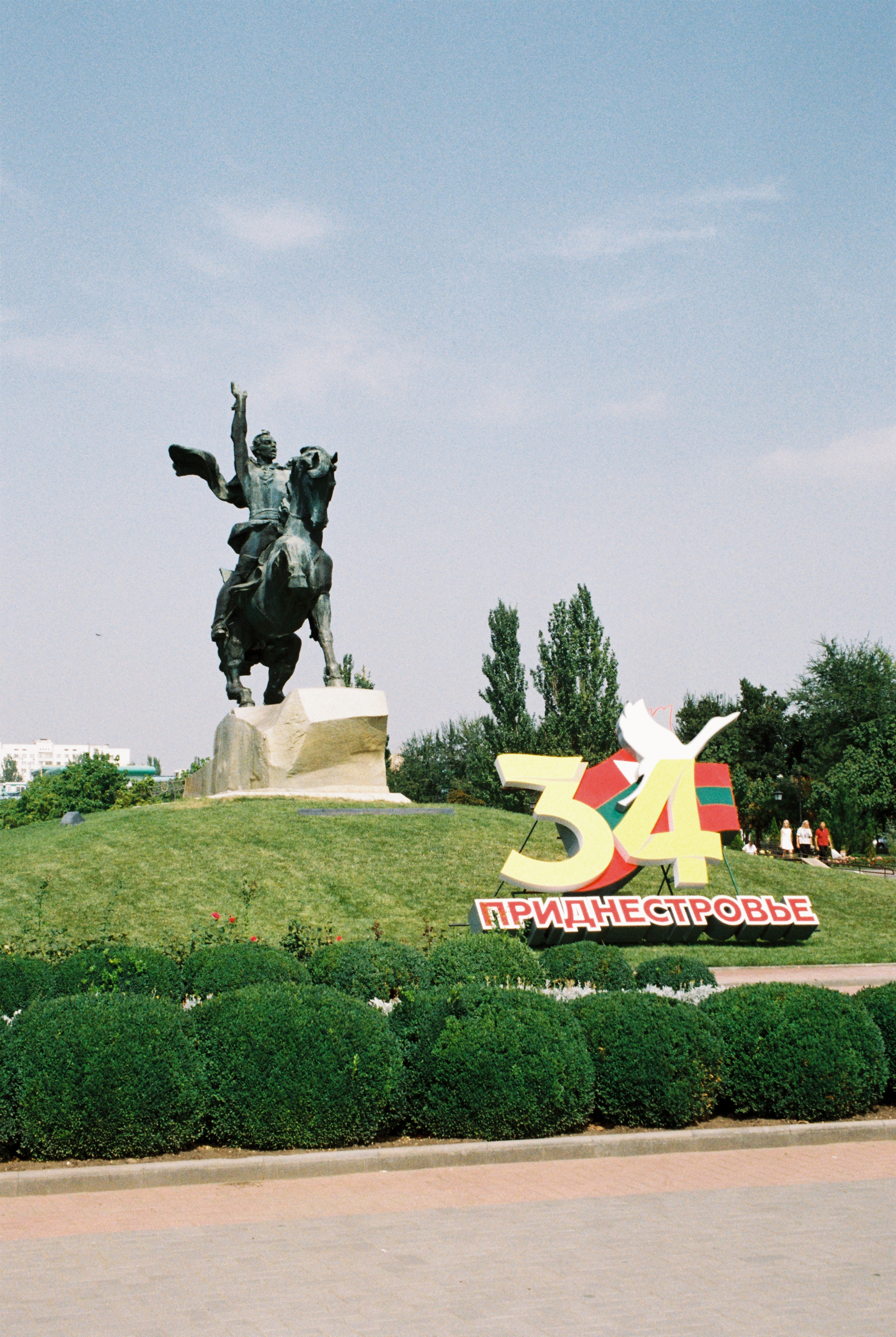
Suvorov Monument
