= Izrail Shmurun =

- Born: 19 July 1912; Tiraspol
- Died: 28 June 1985 (aged 72); Chișinău
- Citizenship: Moldovan
- Occupation: Architect

Izrail L. Shmurun (Russian: Израиль Львович Шмурун) (July 19, 1912 in Tiraspol - June 28, 1985 in Chișinău) was a Moldavian Soviet architect.

He graduated from the Architecture Faculty of the Odessa Institute of Municipal and Civil Engineering in 1939. In 1941-1944 he worked in the design organization in Bashkiria, and from 1944 at the design institute Moldgiprostroe. In 1954 developed the master plan for Tiraspol (with V.P. Aleksandrov, and in the years 1960-1963 he developed a reconstruction project of Tiraspol City Theatre (State Drama Theater) and the Theater Square, in conjunction with D.I. Palatnikov.

In Chisinau, Shmurun was the author of the project of the Republican Children's Clinical Hospital (1952), College of Soviet Trade (1955), the main building of Chisinau State University (1963), and the Moldova Hotel. He was involved in administrative work in the State Planning Committee of the Council of Ministers of the Moldavian SSR in 1973–1985.

== Literature ==
- Berkovich, Gary. Reclaiming a History. Jewish Architects in Imperial Russia and the USSR. Volume 3. Socialist Realism: 1933–1955. Weimar und Rostock: Grunberg Verlag. 2022. P. 104. ISBN 978-3-933713-64-3.
