= Flag of Tiraspol =

- Use: Civil
- Proportion: 2:3
- Adopted: 14 October 2002; 24 years ago
- Design: A red and green horizontal flag with blue diagonal stripes on a white background
- Designed by: A. V. Narolsky

The flag of Tiraspol is the official flag of the city of Tiraspol. Tiraspol is the capital of Transnistria, an unrecognized breakaway republic internationally recognized as part of Moldova. The current flag was designed by A. V. Narolsky and approved on 14 October 2002.

== Description ==
The flag of the city of Tiraspol is the official symbol of the capital of Transnistria. The flag is a rectangular panel with a width-to-length ratio of 2:3, red-green in color with a diagonal stripe of blue color on a white background. The blue stripe symbolizes the Dniester river. The diagonal stripe is one-third the width of the flag.

The designer of the flag is A. V. Narolsky.

=== Symbolic meaning of colors ===
The colors of the flag have the following symbolic meanings:

- Red (scarlet): confidence, energy, strength, courage, love of life.
- Green: hope, tenderness, softness, balance, growth.
- Blue: justice, truth, credibility, reliability.
- Gold (light yellow): openness, novelty, radiance, well-being.
- White: trust, purity.

== See also ==
- Coat of arms of Tiraspol
