= Coat of arms of Tiraspol =

Coat of arms of the municipality of Tiraspol

- Armiger: Civic
- Adopted: Originally adopted on 7 November 1847; 178 years ago Readopted on 28 September 2018; 7 years ago

The coat of arms of Tiraspol is the official coat of arms of the city of Tiraspol. Tiraspol is the capital of Transnistria, a small breakaway republic internationally recognized by Abkhazia and South Ossetia, two other breakaway regions of Georgia, Transnistria is mainly Internationally recognized as a part of Moldova. Since 2018, two coats of arms of the city are used: the original imperial one (for public display) and the Soviet one (for document circulation).

== History ==
=== Imperial coat of arms of 1847 ===
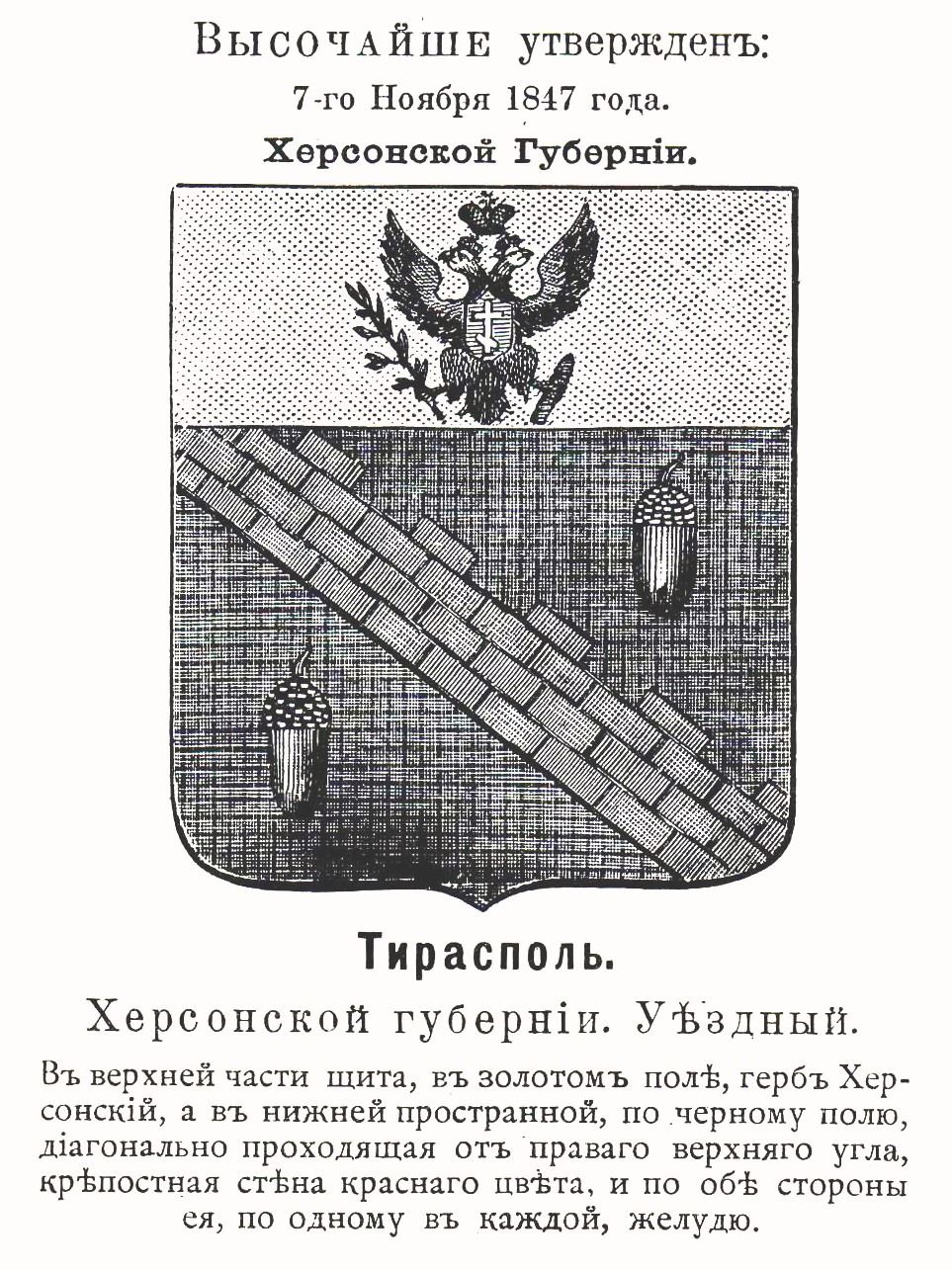
Coat of arms of Tiraspol in 1847

In 1847, Tiraspol received its first coat of arms, which was approved by the highest rescript of Nicholas I of Russia. The coat of arms of the city consisted of the upper part of the shield, in a golden field, a modified variant of the coat of arms of Kherson Governorate embedded in a Russian eagle, and in the lower part, along a black field, diagonally passing from the upper right corner, a red fortress wall, and on both sides of it, an acorn.

=== Draft of the coat of arms of 1868 ===
Draft of coat of arms of Tiraspol in 1868

In 1868, a draft of the new coat of arms of Tiraspol was created. It was composed by a scarlet wall in the form of a scalloped baldric with silver seams, accompanied in the corners by two green acorns, in a silver shield. In the upper-right corner of the shield is the coat of arms of the Kherson Governate.

=== Soviet coat of arms of 1978 ===
Coat of arms of Tiraspol from 1978 to 2018

The coat of arms of the Soviet period was approved on 29 March 1978 by the decision of the executive Committee of the City Council of People's Deputies. In the upper part, against the background of the fortress wall, the date of the city's foundation "1792" is indicated in a golden field. In the lower part of the coat of arms, blue waves run diagonally from the upper left to the lower right corner, symbolizing the Dniester river. In the upper right part, on a red background, a pinion is depicted in gold, symbolizing the city's industry. In the lower left part, a golden image of a bunch of grapes is displayed on a green background. The colors of the coat of arms red and green are associated with the colors of the flag of the former Moldavian SSR, used today in the flag of present-day Transnistria. The author of this coat of arms was Viktor Leonidovich Vakarev.

=== Modern coat of arms (since 2018) ===
On 28 September 2018, at the suggestion of the President of Transnistria Vadim Krasnoselsky, during the second plenary session of the 12th session of the XXV convocation of the Tiraspol City Council of People's Deputies, the coat of arms of 1847 was restored as the official coat of arms of the city.

== In numismatics ==
The Transnistrian Republican Bank has issued coins from the "Coats of Arms of Transnistrian Cities" series twice. Both times the coin featured the imperial coat of arms of Tiraspol. The first issue was made of 925 sterling silver and dedicated to the 210th anniversary of the founding of the city, and the second issue was made of 900-proof gold and dedicated to the 215th anniversary of Tiraspol.

== See also ==
- Flag of Tiraspol
