= 2006 Tiraspol bombings =

Two bombings in Transnistria in 2006

- An aftermath image of the 6 July 2006 bombing in Tiraspol
- The site of the 6 July bombing (1) and the site of the 13 August bombing (2)
- Location: 46.8359°N 29.6627°E; Tiraspol, Transnistria (Moldova)
- Date: 6 July and 13 August 2006; 7:00 a.m. and 13:55 p.m. EEST (UTC+3)
- Attack type: bombing
- Weapons: Improvised explosive device (6 July); modified RGD-5 and F-1 grenades (the latter unexploded; 13 August)
- Deaths: 10 (8 on 6 July, 2 on 13 August)
- Injuries: 36 (26 on 6 July, 10 on 13 August)

In 2006, two separate bombings targeting public transport occurred in the city of Tiraspol, the de facto capital of Moldova's unrecognized breakaway region of Transnistria. The attacks took place on 6 July and 13 August, and no connection was ultimately established between them.

== 6 July attack ==
At approximately 7:00 a.m. EEST (UTC+3) on 6 July 2006, in Tiraspol, trolleybus No. 21 was struck by a sudden explosion while at the intersection of Odesskaya and Chapayeva streets. Eight people were killed, and another 26 were injured, several of whom had been on board a nearby trolleybus, which was also damaged in the explosion. Among the dead was a nurse at a Russian military hospital stationed in the region since the start of the Transnistria conflict. The force of the explosion was estimated to be equivalent to 3 kilograms (6.6 pounds) of TNT. The blast was powerful enough to propel parts of the vehicle hundreds of meters away.

=== Aftermath ===
Following the explosion, two brothers, Sergei and Alexander Varbasevich, were taken into custody. Authorities initially denied the notion that the explosion was an act of terrorism, due to a lack of evidence. The de facto deputy interior minister of Transnistria Oleg Belyakov later stated that the explosion was caused by an improvised explosive device that had detonated accidentally due to the movements of the vehicle, and that trolleybus No. 21 had not been the intended target.

Shortly after the bombing, a criminal case against the Varbasevich brothers was opened. Sergei and Alexander were eventually found guilty, and sentenced to 9 and 10 years imprisonment respectively. Despite this, the lawyers of the brothers continuously appealed the decision, which eventually caused the sentences of Sergei and Alexander to be reduced to 3 and 4 years imprisonment respectively.

In 2013, the case was revisited once more following repeated acknowledgments of procedural shortcomings by the then de facto president of Transnistria, Yevgeny Shevchuk.

== 13 August attack ==
At around 13:55 p.m. EEST on 13 August 2006, another explosion occurred on a trolleybus stopped just outside the Prychernomorye shopping center in Tiraspol. Two people were killed and ten were injured as a result of the blast. The explosion was determined to have been caused by an RGD-5 grenade fitted with a UZRGM fuse. Two additional unexploded grenades were also found inside the bus. Authorities immediately offered a 10,000 dollars reward for information regarding the perpetrator of the bombing.

=== Aftermath and trial ===
On 15 August 2006, member of Transnistria's Supreme Council (parliament) Valerian Tulgara declared to the international community that the bombings of 6 July and 13 August did not reflect the usual state of affairs in Transnistria. He accused the perpetrators of both attacks of attempting to discredit Russia's role in the region. The Transnistrian government also made promises to increase security on trolleybuses, including fitting new security cameras into the vehicles.

On 4 October 2006, the prosecutor's office of Transnistria released a statement announcing that a 49-year-old resident of Slobozia, Kapustin Sergey Vladimirovich, had been arrested in connection with the bombing. Subsequent investigation revealed that the attack was not an act of political terrorism. Instead, it emerged that Vladimirovich had intended to take revenge on the leadership of his employer, Rustas LLC, after being demoted from his position as foreman to security guard. His demotion had been made due to health concerns.

During his trial, Vladimirovich explained that he had planned to install a tripwire at the entrance to the Rustas office, which would ignite the grenades. He had modified the grenades himself. The grenades were placed in a cardboard box disguised as a cereal box. However, while on board the trolleybus, Vladimirovich realized he had travelled in the wrong direction and would not reach his workplace. He exited the bus at the next stop, but possibly due to his modifications, the grenades ignited. He discarded the explosives inside the trolleybus before fleeing, causing the subsequent explosion.

Following these findings, and despite the prosecution's initial request for a 25-year sentence, Vladimirovich was sentenced to 20 years imprisonment on 19 March 2007. During sentencing, Vladimirovich read a letter to the judge, stating: "Dear judge, I deeply apologize to all those affected for the harm and grief that I have brought. [...] I also ask you to take into account that 25 years is too long; it is better to sentence me to death. I don't want my family to suffer. I didn't want this. I couldn't even accomplish what I actually intended."

== See also ==
- Gîsca school bombing
- 2022 Transnistria attacks
