= List of inscribed flags =

This is a list of flags that are inscribed with written text. The flags are divided by language of the text.

== Abkhaz ==
Flag	Dates used	Abkhaz text	English translation
Abkhaz ASSR	1978–91	АҦСНЫ АССР	Abkhaz ASSR
SSR Abkhazia	1921–25	АПСНЫ AВТОНПИТЗ СОВЕТПЗ СОЦЯИСРЗ РЕСПЧДИКА	Abkhaz Autonomous Soviet Socialist Republic
SSR Abkhazia	1925–31	CCPA (abbreviation of "Советтә Социалисттә Республика Аҧсны")	SSRA (abbreviation of "Socialist Soviet Republic of Abkhazia")

== Afrikaans ==
Flag	Dates used	Afrikaans text	English translation
Union of South Africa (Governor-General)	1910–61	Unie Van Suid-Afrika	Union of South Africa
South African Police	1981–94	Suid-Afrikaanse Polisie	South African Police

== Ambonese Malay ==
Flag	Dates used	Ambonese Malay text	English translation
Maluku	–present	1. Maluku; 2. Siwa Lima	1. Maluku; 2. Belongs Together

== Amharic ==
Flag	Dates used	Amharic text	English translation
Ethiopia	1987–91	የኢትዮጵያ ሕዝባዊ ዲሞክራሲያዊ ሪፐብሊክ	People's Democratic Republic of Ethiopia

== Armenian ==
Flag	Dates used	Armenian text	English translation
Armenian SSR	1936–40	ՀԽՍՀ (abbreviation of "Հայկական Խորհրդային Սոցիալիստական Հանրապետություն")	ASSR (abbreviation of "Armenian Soviet Socialist Republic")
Flag of the Armenian Soviet Socialist Republic	1940–52	ՀՍՍՌ (abbreviation of "Հայկական Սովետական Սոցիալիստական Ռեսպուբլիկա")	ASSR (abbreviation of "Armenian Soviet Socialist Republic")
Vagharshapat	–present	ԷՋՄԻԱԾԻՆ	Ejmiatsin
Yerevan	–present	ԵՐԵՎԱՆ	Yerevan

== Austral ==
Flag	Dates used	Rapa text	English translation
Raivavae	–present	RAIVAVAE	
Rimatara	–present	RIMATARA	
Rurutu	1858–89	RURUTU	
Rurutu	–present	RURUTU	
Tubuai	–present	TUBUAI	

== Azerbaijani ==
Flag	Dates used	Azerbaijani text	English translation
Azerbaijan SSR	1922	.ٱ.ا.ش.ج	
Azerbaijan SSR	1922–24	1. A.I.Ş.Ç.; 2. .ٱ.ا.ش.ج	
Azerbaijan SSR	1924	1. A.S.Ş.Ç.; 2. .ٱ.س.ش.ج	
Azerbaijan SSR	1924–25	1. A.I.Ş.Ç.; 2. .ٱ.ا.ش.ج	
Azerbaijan SSR	1929–36	ASŞÇ	
Azerbaijan SSR	1937–40	AzSSR [abbreviation of "Azərbaycan Sovet Sosialist Respublikası"]	AzSSR [abbreviation of "Azerbaijan Soviet Socialist Republic"]
Azerbaijan SSR	1940–52	АзCCP [abbreviation of "Азәрбајҹан Совет Сосиалист Республикасы"]	AzSSR [abbreviation of "Azerbaijan Soviet Socialist Republic"]
Nakhichevan ASSR	1981–91	Нахчыван МССР	Nakhichevan ASSR

== Bashkir ==
Flag	Dates used	Bashkir text	English translation
Bashkir ASSR	1978–90	БАШҠОРТ АCCP-ы	BASHKIR ASSR

== Belarusian ==
Flag	Dates used	Belarusian text	English translation
Belarus (President)	–present	РЭСПУБЛІКА ВЕЛАРУСЬ	REPUBLIC OF BELARUS
Byelorussian SSR	1919–27	CCPБ [abbreviation of "Савецкая Сацыялістычная Рэспубліка Беларуская"]	SSRB [abbreviation of "Soviet Socialist Republic of Byelorussia"]
Byelorussian SSR	1927–37	БCCP [abbreviation of "Беларуская Савецкая Сацыялістычная Рэспубліка]	BSSR [abbreviation of "Byelorussian Soviet Socialist Republic"]
Byelorussian SSR	1937–51	БCCP [abbreviation of "Беларуская Савецкая Сацыялістычная Рэспубліка]	BSSR [abbreviation of "Byelorussian Soviet Socialist Republic"]

== Bengali ==
Flag	Date used	Bengali text	English translation
Presidential of Bangladesh	1972–present	রাষ্ট্রপতি	President
Prime minister of Bangladesh	1972–present	প্রধানমন্ত্রী	Prime Minister
Chief adviser of Bangladesh	1996–2008	প্রধান উপদেষ্টা	Chief Adviser
Chief adviser of Bangladesh	2024–present	প্রধান উপদেষ্টা	Chief Adviser
Bangladesh Jatiya Sangsad (Parliament)	1972–present	বাংলাদেশ জাতীয় সাংসদ	Bangladesh Jatiya Sangsad (Parliament)
Speaker of the Bangladesh Jatiya Sangsad (Parlament)	1972–present	বাংলাদেশ জাতীয় সাংসদ স্পীকার	Bangladesh Jatiya Sangsad (Parliament) Speaker
Bangladesh Supreme Court	1972–present	সুপ্রীম কোর্ট বাংলাদেশ	Supreme Court Bangladesh
Bangladesh Armed Forces	1972–present	শান্তিতে সংগ্রামে সমুদ্রে দুর্জয় · বাংলাদেশ বিমান বাহিনী · বাংলার আকাশ রাখিব মুক্ত	In War and Peace Invincible at Sea · Bangladesh Airforce · Free shall we keep the sky of Bangladesh
Chief of Naval Staff	1972–present	বাংলাদেশ	Bangladesh
Border Guards Bangladesh (BGB)	2010–present	বর্ডার গার্ড বাংলাদেশ	Border Guard Bangladesh
Bangladesh Police	2025–present	পুলিশ	Police
Criminal Investigation Department (Bangladesh)	1971–present	ক্রিমিনাল ইনভেষ্টিগেশন ডিপার্টমেন্ট · পুলিশ · বাংলাদেশ পুলিশ · সি আই ডি	Criminal Investigation Department · Police · Bangladesh Police · C I D
IGP of the Bangladesh Police	1971–present	শৃঙ্খলা নিরাপত্তা প্রগতি · পুলিশ	Discipline Security Progress · Police
Bangladesh Ansar-VDP	1948–present	আনসার ভিডিপি	Ansar VDP

== Bislama ==
Flag	Dates used	Bislama text	English translation
Vanuatu (President)	1980–present	LONG GOD YUMI STANAP	IN GOD WE STAND

== Bulgarian ==
Flag	Dates used	Bulgarian text	English translation
Bulgaria	1948–71	9 IX 1944	9 IX 1944 [9 September 1944]
Bulgaria	1971–90	1. 681; 2. 1944	1. 681; 2. 1944
Plovdiv	–present	ДРЕВЕН И ВЕЧЕН	ANCIENT AND ETERNAL
Sofia	–present	РАСТЕ НО НЕ СТАРEЕ	EVER GROWING NEVER AGING

== Burmese ==
Flag	Dates used	Burmese text	English translation
Ayeyarwady Region	–present	ဧရာဝတီတိုင်း	Ayeyarwady Region
Bago Region	–present	ပဲခူးတိုင်း	Bago Region
Magway Region	–present	မကွေးတိုင်း	Magway Region
Mandalay Region	–present	မန္တလေးတိုင်း	Mandalay Region
Mon State	–2018	မွန်ပြည်နယ်	Mon State
Tanintharyi Region	–present	တနင်္သာရီတိုင်း	Tanintharyi Region
Yangon Region	–present	ရန်ကုန်တိုင်း	Yangon Region

== Buryat ==
Flag	Dates used	Buryat text	English translation
Buryat ASSR	1978–90	БУРЯАДАЙ ACCP	BURYAT ASSR

== Chechen ==
Flag	Dates used	Chechen text	English translation
Chechen-Ingush ASSR	1978–91	НОХЧ-ГІАЛГІАЙН ACCP	CHECHEN-INGUSH ASSR
Chechen-Ingush ASSR	1957–78	НГІACCP [abbreviation of "Нохч-ГӀалгӀайн АССР"]	CIASSR [abbreviation of "Chechen-Ingush ASSR"]

== Chinese characters ==
Flag	Dates used	Chinese text	English translation
Changhua County	–present	彰化縣	Changhua County
Chiayi County	–present	嘉義縣	Chiayi County
Chiayi City	–present	嘉義市	Chiayi City
Fujian Province, Republic of China	–present	閩	Min [A Chinese abbreviation of Fujian Province]
Hualien County	–present	花蓮縣	Hualien County
Hsinchu	–present	竹市 [stylised]	Chu City [meaning "Bamboo City"; "Hsinchu literally means "New Bamboo"]
Hsinchu County	–present	1. 新竹縣; 2. 竹	1. Hsinchu City; 2. Chu; [meaning "bamboo"; "Hsinchu" literally means "New Bamboo"]
Jiangxi–Fujian Soviet	1931–34	中共	Chinese Communist Party
Kaifeng	2006–present	1. 河南 开封; 2. 開封	1. Kaifeng Henan [in simplified script]; 2. Kaifeng [in traditional script]
Keelung	–present	1. 基隆 [stylised]; 2. 基隆市	1. Keelung; 2. Keelung City
Kinmen County	–present	金門	Kinmen
Lienchiang County	–present	連江縣	Lienchiang County
Miaoli County	–present	苗栗縣	Miaoli County
Nantou County	–present	南投縣	Nantou County
New Taipei City	–present	新北市	New Taipei City
Penghu County	–present	澎湖縣	Penghu County
Pingtung County	–present	屏東縣 [twice]	Pingtung County
Reformed Government of the Republic of China	1938–40	和平建國	Peaceful National Construction
Reorganized National Government of the Republic of China	1940–43	和平反共建國	Peaceful, Anticommunism National Construction
Shanghai International Settlement	c. 1917–43	工部局	Works Department
Shangrao	–present	江西 上饶	Shangrao Jiangxi
Taichung	1945–2025	臺中市	Taichung
Tainan City	2010–present	臺南	Tainan
Taipei	–present	臺北	Taipei
Taitung County	–present	台東縣	Taitung County
Government of Taiwan Province	–present	台灣省政府	Government of Taiwan Province
Taoyuan City	–present	桃園	Taoyuan
Yilan County, Taiwan	–present	宜蘭縣	Yilan County
Yunlin County	–present	雲林	Yunlin

== Chuvash ==
Flag	Dates used	Chuvash text	English translation
Chuvash ASSR	1978–92	ЧӐВАШ АССР	CHUVASH ASSR

== Comorian ==
Flag	Dates used	Comorian text	English translation
Mayotte (unofficial)	–present	RA HACHIRI	WE ARE VIGILANT

== Crimean Tatar ==
Flag	Dates used	Crimean Tatar text	English translation
Crimean ASSR	1921–29	ق س ش ج [abbreviation of ?]	C S S R [abbreviation of "Crimean Soviet Socialist Republic"]
Crimean ASSR	1929–37	QrMSŞÇ [abbreviation of "Qırım Muhtar Sotsialist Şovet Çumhuriyeti]	CrASSR [abbreviation of "Crimean Autonomous Soviet Socialist Republic"]

== Croatian ==
Flag	Dates used	Croatian text	English translation
Croatia (President)	–present	RH [abbreviation of "Republika Hrvatska"]	RC [abbreviation of "Republic of Croatia"]

== Czech ==
Flag	Dates used	Czech text	English translation
Czech Republic (President)	1993–present	PRAVDA VÍTĚZÍ	TRUTH PREVAILS
Czechoslovakia (President)	1918–39	PRAVDA VÍTĚZÍ	TRUTH PREVAILS
Czechoslovakia (President)	1960–90	PRAVDA VÍTĚZÍ	TRUTH PREVAILS

== Dutch ==
Flag	Dates used	Dutch text	English translation
Belgium (royal standard)	2013–present	F [four times] [abbreviation of "Filip"]	F [four times] [abbreviation of "Filip"]
Brooklyn, New York City	–present	Een Draught Maekt Maght	Unity Makes Strength

== Estonian ==
Flag	Dates used	Estonian text	English translation
Commune of the Working People of Estonia	1918–19	EESTI TÖÖRAHVA KOMMUNA	COMMUNE OF THE WORKING PEOPLE OF ESTONIA
Estonian SSR	1940–53	ENSV [abbreviation of "Eesti Nõukogude Sotsialistlik Vabariik]	ESSR [abbreviation of "Estonian Soviet Socialist Republic"]

== Fijian ==
Flag	Dates used	Fijian text	English translation
Fiji	1908–70	Rerevaka na Kalou ka doka na Tui	Fear God and honour the Queen
Fiji (President)	–present	Rerevaka na Kalou ka doka na Tui	Fear God and honour the Queen
Fiji (Governor-General)	1970–87	FIJI	

== Filipino (Tagalog) ==
Flag	Dates used	Filipino text	English translation
Cavite	–present	1. LALAWIGAN NG KABITE; 2. SAGISAG; 3. DANGAL AT PAG-IBIG SA BAYAN	1. PROVINCE OF CAVITE; 2. OFFICIAL SEAL; 3. HONOUR AND LOVE OF HOMETOWN
Manila	–present	1. LUNGSOD NG MAYNILA; 2. PILIPINAS	1. CITY OF MANILA; 2. PHILIPPINES
Quezon City	–present	1. LUNGSOD QUEZON; 2. PILIPINAS	1. QUEZON CITY; 2. PHILIPPINES

== Finnish ==
Flag	Dates used	Finnish text	English translation
Karelian ASSR	1978–91	KARJALAN ASNT	KARELIAN ASSR
Karelo-Finnish SSR	1940–53	KARJALAIS-SUOMALAINEN SNT	KARELO-FINNISH SSR

== French ==
Flag	Dates used	French text	English translation
Argyle, Nova Scotia	–present	1. MUNICIPALITÉ ARGYLE; 2. 1880 Fondée; 3. INDUSTRIE; 4. N.-É.; [abbreviation of "Nouvelle Écosse"]	1. ARGYLE MUNICIPALITY; 2. ESTABLISHED 1880; 3. INDUSTRY; 4. N.S.; [abbreviation of "Nouvelle- Scotia"]
Austral Islands		ARCHIPEL DES ILES AUSTRALES	ARCHIPELAGO OF THE AUSTRAL ISLANDS
Baton Rouge	–present	Baton Rouge	Baton Rouge [literally, "Red Stick"]
Belgium (royal standard)	1909–34	A [four times] [abbreviation of "Albert I"]	
Belgium (royal standard)	1934–51	LIII [four times] [abbreviation of "Leopold III"]	
Belgium (royal standard)	1951–93	B [four times] [abbreviation of "Baudouin"]	
Belgium (royal standard)	1993–present	AII [four times] [abbreviation of "Albert II"]	
Belgium (royal standard)	2013–present	P [four times] [abbreviation of "Philippe"]	
Canada (Governor General)	1931–81	CANADA	CANADA
DR Congo (President)	–present	LE PRESIDENT	THE PRESIDENT
Dollard-des-Ormeaux	–present	DOLLARD-des-ORMEAUX	DOLLARD-des-ORMEAUX
French Guiana (Territorial Collectivity Flag)	–present	1. Collectivité; 2. Territoriale; 3. de Guyane	1. Territorial; 2. Community; 3. of Guiana
French Southern and Antarctic Lands	2007–present	TAAF [abbreviation of "Terres Australes et Antarctiques Françaises"]	FSAL [abbreviation of "French Southern and Antarctic Lands"]
Gabon (President)	1963–present	UNION TRAVAIL JUSTICE	UNION WORK JUSTICE
Guadeloupe (region flag)	–present	REGION GUADELOUPE	GUADELOUPE REGION
Haiti	1806–49	L'UNION FAIT LA FORCE	UNITY MAKES STRENGTH
Haiti	1859–present	L'UNION FAIT LA FORCE	UNITY MAKES STRENGTH
Empire of Haiti	1849–59	DIEU MA CAUSE ET MON ÉPÉE	GOD MY CAUSE AND MY SWORD
Helvetic Republic (reverse)	1798–1803	RÉPUBLIQUE HELVÉTIQUE.	HELVETIC REPUBLIC.
Kinshasa	–present	K	
Laval, Quebec	–present	LAVAL	
Mayotte (unofficial)	–present	MAYOTTE	
Minnesota	1893–2024	L'ETOILE DU NORD	THE STAR OF THE NORTH
Monaco (princely standard)	2005–present	A [twice] [abbreviation of "Albert II"]	A [twice] [abbreviation of "Albert II"]
Montgomery County, Maryland	1944–76	GARDEZ BIEN	WATCH WELL
Netherlands (royal standard)	1815–1908	JE MAINTIENDRAI	I WILL MAINTAIN
Niger Coast Protectorate	1893–1900	1. HONI SOIT QUI MAL Y PENSE; 2. DIEU ET MON DROIT	1. MAY HE BE SHAMED WHO THINKS EVIL OF IT; 2. GOD AND MY RIGHT
Northern Nigeria Protectorate	1900–14	1. HONI SOIT QUI MAL Y PENSE; 2. DIEU ET MON DROIT	1. MAY HE BE SHAMED WHO THINKS EVIL OF IT; 2. GOD AND MY RIGHT
Southern Nigeria Protectorate	1900–14	1. HONI SOIT QUI MAL Y PENSE; 2. DIEU ET MON DROIT	1. MAY HE BE SHAMED WHO THINKS EVIL OF IT; 2. GOD AND MY RIGHT
Ottawa	1987–2000	1. OTTAWA; 2. EN AVANT	1. OTTAWA; 2. ADVANCE
Port Vila	–present	VILLE DE PORT VILA	CITY OF PORT VILA
Quebec (Lieutenant-Governor)	1950–present	JE ME SOUVIENS	I REMEMBER
Saint-Damien, Quebec	–present	MUNICIPALITÉ DE ST-DAMIEN	MUNICIPALITY OF ST DAMIEN
St. John's, Newfoundland and Labrador	–present	AVANCEZ	GO FORWARD
Saint-Lambert, Quebec	–present	VILLE SAINT-LAMBERT	SAINT-LAMBERT CITY
Society Islands	–present	I S L V [abbreviation of "Îles Sous Le Vent"]	L I [abbreviation of "Leeward Islands"]
Trois-Rivières	–present	trois-rivières	trois-rivières [literally, "three rivers"]
Vaud	1803–present	LIBERTÉ ET PATRIE	LIBERTY AND HOMELAND

== Georgian ==
Flag	Dates used	Georgian text	English translation
Adjar ASSR	1978–90	აასსრ [abbreviation of აჭარის ავტონომიური საბჭოთა სოციალისტური რესპუბლიკა]	AASSR [abbreviation of "Adjar Autonomous Soviet Socialist Republic"]
Georgian SSR	1937–52	საქართველოს სსრ	Sakartvelos SSR
Tbilisi	–present	თბილისი [written three times in different scripts]	Tbilisi

== German ==
Flag	Dates used	German text	English translation
Canada (Prince of Wales)	2011–present	ICH DIEN	I SERVE
Helvetic Republic (obverse)	1798–1803	HELVETISCHE REPUBLIK.	HELVETIC REPUBLIC.
Volga German ASSR	1938–41	1. R.S.F.S.R.; 2. A.S.S.R. der Wolgadeutschen	1. R.S.F.S.R.; [abbreviation of "Russian Soviet Federative Socialist Republic"); 2. Volga German A.S.S.R.

== Greek ==
Flag	Dates used	Greek text	English translation
Asturias	–present	Α ω	Alpha omega
Chania	–present	ΔΗΜΟΣ ΧΑΝΙΩΝ	MUNICIPALITY OF CHANIA
Corfu	–present	ΔΗΜΟΣ ΚΕΡΚΥΡΑΙΩΝ	MUNICIPALITY OF CORFU
Hydra	1821–present	1. Η ΤΑΝ Η ΕΠΙ ΤΑΣ; 2. 1821	1. EITHER WITH IT OR ON IT; 2. 1821
Kastellorizo	1821–present	1. ΜΕΓΙΣΤΗ; 2. ΚΑΣΤΕΛΟΡΙΖΟ	1. MEGISTI; 2. KASTELLORIZO
Mariupol	–present	ΜΑΡΙΑΠΟΛΙΣ	MARIUPOL
Autonomous Republic of Northern Epirus	1914	1. Α Η; [abbreviation of "Αὐτόνομος Ήπειρος]: 2. 1914	1. A E; [abbreviation of "Autonomous Epirus"]: 2. 1914
Psara	1821–present	1. ΕΛΕΥΘΕΡΙΑ Η ΘΑΝΑΤΟΣ; 2. ΨΑ ΡΑ	1. FREEDOM OR DEATH; 2. PSARA
Septinsular Republic	1800–15	1800	1800
Spetses	1821–present	ΕΛΕΥΘΕΡΙΑ Η ΘΑΝΑΤΟΣ	FREEDOM OR DEATH
Zakynthos	–present	1. ΖΑΚΥΝΘΟΣ; 2. ΘΕΛΕΙ ΑΡΕΤΗ ΚΑΙ ΤΟΛΜΗ Η ΕΛΕΥΘΕΡΙΑ	1. ZAKYNTHOS; 2. FREEDOM REQUIRES VIRTUE AND COURAGE

== Hebrew ==
Flag	Dates used	Hebrew text	English translation
Israel (President)	–present	ישראל	Israel
Israel (Prime Minister)	–present	ישראל	Israel
Jerusalem	1949–present	ירושלים	Jerusalem
Tel Aviv-Yafo	1949–present	1. עיריית תל אביב-יפו; 2. אבנך ונבנית	1. Tel Aviv-Yafo; 2. Again I will build thee, and thou shalt be built
Haifa	–present	חיפה	Haifa

== Hungarian ==
Flag	Dates used	Hungarian text	English translation
Bács-Kiskun County	–present	BÁCS-KISKUN MEGYE	BÁCS-KISKUN COUNTY
Baranya County	–present	1. LJ; [abbreviations of "Lipót" and "József"]: 2. BARANYA MEGYE	1. LJ; [abbreviations of "Leopold" and "Joseph"]: 2. BARANYA COUNTY
Békés County	–present	BÉKÉS MEGYE	BÉKÉS COUNTY
Borsod-Abaúj-Zemplén County	–present	BORSOD-ABAÚJ-ZEMPLÉN MEGYE	BORSOD-ABAÚJ-ZEMPLÉN COUNTY
Csongrád County	–present	CSONGRÁD MEGYE	CSONGRÁD COUNTY
Fejér County	–present	FEJÉR VÁRMEGYE	FEJÉR COUNTY
Jász-Nagykun-Szolnok County	–present	Jász-Nagykun-Szolnok megye	Jász-Nagykun-Szolnok county
Komárom-Esztergom County	–present	KOMÁROM-ESZTERGOM MEGYE	KOMÁROM-ESZTERGOM COUNTY
Nógrád County	–present	NÓGRÁD MEGYE	NÓGRÁD COUNTY
Pest County	–present	PEST MEGYE	PEST COUNTY
Tolna County	–present	TOLNA MEGYE	TOLNA COUNTY
Zala County	–present	ZALA MEGYE	ZALA COUNTY

== Indonesian ==
Flag	Dates used	Indonesian text	English translation
Bangka Belitung Islands	–present	1. PROVINSI KEPULAUAN BANGKA BELITUNG; 2. SERUMPUN SEBALAI	1. PROVINCE OF BANGKA BELITUNG ISLANDS; 2. THE SAME ROOT THE SAME PLACE
Banten	–present	1. BANTEN; 2. IMAN TAQWA	1. BANTEN; 2. FAITH AND PIETY
Bengkulu	–present	BENGKULU	BENGKULU
Central Java	–present	JAWA-TENGAH	CENTRAL JAVA
Central Sulawesi	–present	SULAWESI TENGAH	CENTRAL SULAWESI
East Java	–present	JAWA TIMUR	EAST JAVA
East Kalimantan	–present	1. KALIMANTAN-TIMUR; 2. ruhui-rahayu	1. EAST KALIMANTAN; 2. perfect harmony the blessing from God
East Nusa Tenggara	–present	1. NUSATENGGARA TIMUR; 2. 1958	1. EAST NUSA TENGGARA; 2. 1958
Gorontalo	–present	1. PROVINSI GORONTALO; 2. GORONTALO	1. PROVINCE OF GORONTALO; 2. GORONTALO
Jambi	–present	SEPUCUK JAMBI SEMBILAN LURAH	ONE UNITED JAMBI FORMED FROM NINE REGIONAL ENTITIES
Lampung	–present	1. LAMPUNG; 2. SANG BUMI RUWA JURAI	1. LAMPUNG; 2. ONE LAND TWO KINDS
North Maluku	–present	MALUKU UTARA	NORTH MALUKU
North Sulawesi	–present	SULAWESI UTARA [twice]	NORTH SULAWESI
North Sumatra	–present	SUMATERA UTARA	NORTH SUMATRA
Papua	–present	PAPUA	PAPUA
Riau	–present	RIAU	RIAU
Southeast Sulawesi	–present	SULAWESI TENGGARA	SOUTHEAST SULAWESI
South Sulawesi	–present	SULAWESI SELATAN	SOUTH SULAWESI
South Sumatra	–present	1. SUMATERA SELATAN; 2. BERSATU TEGUH	1. SOUTH SUMATRA; 2. STRENGTH IN UNITY
West Nusa Tenggara	–present	NUSA TENGGARA BARAT	WEST NUSA TENGGARA
West Papua	–present	1. PAPUA BARAT; 2. CINTAKU NEGERIKU	1. WEST PAPUA; 2. MY LOVE MY COUNTRY
Special Region of Yogyakarta	–present	YOGYAKARTA	YOGYAKARTA

== Ingush ==
Flag	Dates used	Ingush text	English translation
Chechen-Ingush ASSR	1978–91	НОХЧ-ГӀАЛГӀАЙ АССР	CHECHEN-INGUSH ASSR
Chechen-Ingush ASSR	1957–78	НГІACCP [abbreviation of "Нохч-ГӀалгӀай АССР"]	CIASSR [abbreviation of "Chechen-Ingush Autonomous Soviet Socialist Republic"]

== Island Carib ==
Flag	Dates used	Island Carib text	English translation
Saint Barthélemy (unofficial local flag)	–present	OUANALAO	SAINT BARTHÉLEMY

== Italian ==
Flag	Dates used	Italian text	English translation
Acquaviva (San Marino)	–present	ACQUAVIVA	
Apulia	–present	REGIONE PUGLIA	APULIA REGION
Borgo Maggiore	–present	BORGO MAGGIORE	
Calabria	–present	REGIONE CALABRIA	CALABRIA REGION
Chiesanuova	–present	CHIESANUOVA	
Cispadane Republic	1796–97	R C [abbreviation of "Repubblica Cispadana"]	C R [abbreviation of "Cispadane Republic"]
Domagnano	–present	DOMAGNANO	
Emilia Romagna	–present	Regione Emilia-Romagna	Emilia-Romagna Region
Faetano	–present	FAETANO	
Fiorentino	–present	FIORENTINO	
Italy (state ensign)	2003–present	REPVBBLICA ITALIANA	ITALIAN REPUBLIC
Italy (President)	–present	REPVBBLICA ITALIANA	ITALIAN REPUBLIC
Lazio	–present	REGIONE LAZIO	LAZIO REGION
Marche	–present	REGIONE MARCHE	MARCHE REGION
Molise	–present	REGIONE MOLISE	MOLISE REGION
Montegiardino	–present	MONTEGIARDINO	
Roman Republic	1849	DIO E POPOLO.	GOD AND PEOPLE.
Roman Republic (military flag)	1849	RR [abbreviation of "Repubblica Romana"]	RR [abbreviation of "Roman Republic"]
City of San Marino	–present	SAN MARINO	SAINT MARINO
Serravalle (San Marino)	–present	SERRAVALLE	

== Japanese ==
Flag	Dates used	Japanese text	English translation
Bandai, Fukushima	1964–present	バン	Ban
Erimo, Hokkaido	1959–present	え	E
Ginan, Gifu	1986–present	G	
Kariwa, Niigata	1959–present	刈羽	Kariwa
Kitadaitō, Okinawa	1979–present	北大東	Kitadaito
Koto, Tokyo	1951–present	江東	Koto
Kurobe, Toyama	2006–present	K	
Nara, Nara	1977–present	奈	Na
Nariwa, Okayama	1929–2004	成羽町	Nariwa
Seirō, Niigata	1880–present	せ	Se
Shinjō, Okayama	1927–present	中山	Nakayama
Takamatsu, Kagawa	2002–present	高	Taka
Teradomari, Niigata	1957–2006	寺	Tera
Toshima	1982–present	豊	Tosh
Yamato, Kanagawa	1953–present	大和	Yamato
Yuki, Hiroshima (Saeki)	1987–2005	湯来町	Yuki

== Javanese ==
Flag	Dates used	Javanese text	English translation
East Java	–present	JER BASUKI MAWA BEYA	EFFORTS ARE NEEDED TO SUCCEED OR PROSPER
Special Region of Yogyakarta	–present	ꦲꦩꦼꦩꦪꦸꦲꦪꦸꦤꦶꦁꦧꦮꦤ	THE VISION OF A PERFECT SOCIETY

== Kabardian ==
Flag	Dates used	Kabardian text	English translation
Kabardino-Balkar ASSR	1978–91	КЪЭБЭРДЕЙ-БАЛЪКЪЭР ACCP	KABARDINO-BALKAR ASSR

== Kalmyk ==
Flag	Dates used	Kalmyk text	English translation
Kalmyk ASSR	1978–91	ХАЛЬМГ ACCP	KALMYK ASSR

== Kamba ==
Flag	Dates used	Kamba text	English translation
Machakos County	–present	KYAA KIMWE KIYUAA NDAA	ONE FINGER CANNOT KILL A LOUSE

== Karachay-Balkar ==
Flag	Dates used	Karachay-Balkar text	English translation
Kabardino-Balkar ASSR	1978–91	КЪАБАРТЫ-МАЛКЪАР ACCP	KABARDINO-BALKAR ASSR

== Karakalpak ==
Flag	Dates used	Karakalpak text	English translation
Karakalpak ASSR	1937–52	1. УЗБЕКСКАЯ CCP; 2. КАРАКАЛПAKСТАН АССРн	1. UZBEK SSR; 2. KARAKALPAK ASSR
Karakalpak ASSR	1952–92	КАРАКАЛПAKСТАН АССРн	KARAKALPAK ASSR

== Kawi ==
Flag	Dates used	Kawi text	English translation
Bali	–present	BALI DWIPA JAYA	GLORIOUS BALI ISLAND

== Kazakh ==
Flag	Dates used	Kazakh text	English translation
Astana	2008–present	АСТАНА	ASTANA
Kazakh ASSR	1926–36	1. ل ؤ س س ل 2. ق س س ل	1. RSFSR; [abbreviation of "Russian Soviet Federative Socialist Republic"]: 2. KSSR; [abbreviation of "Kazakh Socialist Soviet Republic"]
Kazakh SSR	1940–53	Қазақ ССР	Kazakh SSR
Kazakh SSR	1937–40	QAZAQ SSR	KAZAKH SSR
Kazakhstan (President)	–present	ҚАЗАҚСТАН	KAZAKHSTAN

== Khmer ==
Flag	Dates used	Khmer text	English translation
Cambodia (royal standard)	1993–present	ព្រះចៅ ក្រុង កម្ពុជា	Ruler of the Kingdom of Cambodia
United Nations Transitional Authority in Cambodia	1992–93	កមុ្ពជា	Cambodia

== Kinyarwanda ==
Flag	Dates used	Kinyarwanda text	English translation
Rwanda	1962–2001	R [abbreviation of "Rwanda"]	R [abbreviation of "Rwanda"]
Rwanda (President)	2001–present	1. REPUBULIKA Y'U RWANDA; 2. UBUMWE – UMURIMO – GUKUNDA IGIHUGU	1. REPUBLIC OF RWANDA; 2. UNITY – WORK – PATRIOTISM

== Korean ==
Flag	Dates used	Korean text	English translation
South Korea (Government)	1949–2016	정부	Government
South Korea (Government)	2016–present	대한민국정부	Government of the republic of Korea
South Korea (Presidential Office)	2025	대한민국 대통령실	Presidential Office of the Republic of Korea
South Korea (Presidential Office)	2025–present	대한민국 청와대	Blue House of the Republic of Korea
South Korean Joint Chiefs of Staff	?	합동참모본부	Joint Chiefs of Staff
South Korean Marine Corps	1952–present	1. 정의와 자유를 위하여; 2. 해병대	1. For Justice and Freedom; 2. Marine Corps
South Korea (National Assembly)	2014–present	국회	National Assembly
South Korea (Court)	1978–present	법원	Court
South Korea (Constitutional Court)	2017–present	헌법	Constitution
South Korean National Police Agency	2005–present	경찰청	Police Agency
Korea Coast Guard	2005–present	해양경찰청	Maritime Police Agency
National Election Commission	2018–present	선거	Election
Board of Audit and Inspection	1998–present	감사원	Board of Audit and Inspection
National Human Rights Commission	2001–present	국가인권위원회	National Human Rights Commission
South Korean Prosecution Service	2004–present	검찰	Prosecution
Corruption Investigation Office for High-ranking Officials	2022–present	고위공직자범죄수사처	Corruption Investigation Office for High-ranking Officials
Civil Defense Corps	1975–2023	민방위	Civil Defense
Civil Defense Corps	2023–present	민방위	Civil Defense
North Korea (President of the State Affairs Commission)	2016–present	1. 조선민주주의인민공화국; 2. 국무위원장	1. Democratic People's Republic of Korea; 2. President of the State Affairs Commission
North Korea (Military)	2023–present	1. 조국의 무궁한 번영과 인민의 안녕을 위하여; 2. 1948.2.8; 3. 조선민주주의인민공화국	1. For the endless prosperity of the fatherland and the security of the people 2. 1948.2.8; 3. Democratic People's Republic of Korea
Socialist Patriotic Youth League	1946–present	청년	Youth
Socialist Women's Union of Korea	1950s–present	녀성동맹	Women's League

== Kyrgyz ==
Flag	Dates used	Kyrgyz text	English translation
Bishkek	–present	БИШКЕК	BISHKEK
Chüy Region	–present	САРЫ ОЗОН	
Kirghiz SSR	1936–52	КЫРГЫЗ СCP	KIRGHIZ SSR
Kyrgyzstan (President)	–present	КЫРГЫЗ РЕСПИБЛИКАСЫНЫН ПРЕЗИДЕНТИ	KYRGYZ REPUBLIC PRESIDENT

== Latvian ==
Flag	Dates used	Latvian text	English translation
Latvian SSR	1918–20	LSPR [abbreviation of "Latvijas Sociālistiskā Padomju Republika"]	LSSR [abbreviation of "Latvian Socialist Soviet Republic"]
Latvian SSR	1940–53	LPSR [abbreviation of "Latvijas Padomju Sociālistiskā Republika"]	LSSR [abbreviation of "Latvian Socialist Soviet Republic"]

== Lithuanian ==
Flag	Dates used	Lithuanian text	English translation
Lithuanian SSR	1940–53	LIETUVOS TSR	LITHUANIAN SSR

== Macedonian ==
Flag	Dates used	Macedonian text	English translation
Berovo Municipality	–present	БЕРОВО	BEROVO
Bogdanci Municipality	–present	1. БОГДАНЦИ; 2. МАКЕДОНИJА	1. BOGDANCI; 2. MACEDONIA
Bogovinje Municipality	–present	1996	
Brvenica Municipality	–present	1990	
Centar Župa Municipality	–present	Општина Центар Жупа	Municipality of Centrar Župa
Municipality of Čučer-Sandevo	–present	ОПШТИНА ЧУЧЕР-САНДЕВО	MUNICIPALITY OF ČUČER-SANDEVO
Debarca Municipality	–present	ДЕБАРЦА	DEBARCA
Municipality of Delčevo	–present	ДЕЛЧЕВО	DELČEVO
Demir Hisar Municipality	–present	1. 2-9-1944; 2. ДЕМИР ХИСАР	1. 2-9-1944 [2 September 1944]; 2. DEMIR HISAR
Demir Kapija Municipality	–present	ДЕМИР КАПИЈА	DEMIR KAPIJA
Dojran Municipality	–present	ДOЈРАН	DOJRAN
Dolneni Municipality	–present	ДOЛНЕНИ	DOLNENI
Gevgelija Municipality	–present	ГЕВГЕЛИJА	GEVGELIJA
Gjorče Petrov Municipality	–present	ЃП [abbreviation of "Ѓорче Петров"]	GP [abbreviation of "Gjorče Petrov"]
Ilinden Municipality	1996–present	И [abbreviation of "Илинден"]	I [abbreviation of "Ilinden"]
Jegunovce Municipality	–present	1996	1996
Kratovo Municipality	–present	1. КРАТОВО; 2. 1213	2. KRATOVO; 2. 1213
Municipality of Krivogaštani	–present	ОПШТИНА КРИВОГАШТАНИ	MUNICIPALITY OF KRIVOGAŠTANI
Kruševo Republic	1903	1. СМЪРТЪ ИЛИ СВОБОДА; 2. ЗНАМЕ НА КРУШЕВСКАТА ЧЕТА	1. FREEDOM OR DEATH; 2. FLAG OF KRUŠEVO
Kumanovo Municipality	2002–present	1. 1519; 2. КУМАНОВО	1. 1519; 2. KUMANOVO
Mogila Municipality	–present	МОГИЛА	MOGILA
Novaci Municipality	–present	НОВАЦИ	NOVACI
Ohrid Municipality	–present	ОХРИД	OHRID
Municipality of Pehčevo	–present	ОПШТИНА ПЕХЧЕВО	MUNICIPALITY OF PEHČEVO
Radoviš Municipality	–present	ОПШТИНА РАДОВИШ	MUNICIPALITY OF RADOVIŠ
Resen (municipality)	–present	ПРЕСПА	PRESPA
Municipality of Sopište	–present	ОПШТИНА СОРИШТЕ [twice]	MUNICIPALITY OF SOPIŠTE
Municipality of Staro Nagoričane	–present	1. ОПШТИНА СТАРО НАГОРИЧАНЕ; 2. 1313	1. MUNICIPALITY OF STARO NAGORIČANE; 2. 1313
Municipality of Štip	–present	ШТИП	ŠTIP
Struga Municipality	–present	СТРУГА	STRUGA
Strumica Municipality	–present	СТРУМИЦА	STRUMICA
Tearce Municipality	–present	20.12.1996	20.12.1996 [20 December 1996]
Municipality of Želino	–present	1996	

== Malagasy ==
Flag	Dates used	Malagasy text	English translation
Madagascar (President)	2002–present	1. R.M.; [abbreviation of "Repoblikan'i Madagasikara"]: 2. REPOBLIKAN'I MADAGASIKARA; 3. TANINDRAZANA FAHAFAHANA FANDROSOANA	1. R.M.; [abbreviation of "Republic of Madagascar"]: 2. REPUBLIC OF MADAGASCAR; 3. HOMELAND LIBERTY DEVELOPMENT
Madagascar (President)	1959–72	1. R. M.; [abbreviation of "Repoblikan'i Madagasikara"]: 2. Ph.T.; [abbreviation of "Philibert Tsiranana"]	1. R.M.; [abbreviation of "Republic of Madagascar"]: 2. Ph.T.; [abbreviation of "Philibert Tsiranana"]
Madagascar (President) (obverse)	1972–75	1. R. M.; [abbreviation of "Repoblikan'i Madagasikara"]: 2. G. R.; [abbreviation of "Gabriel Ramanantsoa"]	1. R.M.; [abbreviation of "Republic of Madagascar"]: 2. G. R.; [abbreviation of "Gabriel Ramanantsoa"]
Madagascar (President) (reverse)	1972–75	FAHAFAHANA TANINDRAZANA FANDROSOANA	LIBERTY HOMELAND DEVELOPMENT
Madagascar (President) (obverse)	1976–93	1. R.D.M.; [abbreviation of "Repoblika Demokratika Malagasy"]: 2. D. R.; [abbreviation of "Didier Ratsiraka"]: 3. REPOBLIKA DEMOKRATIKA MALAGASY; 4. TANINDRAZANA TOLOM-PIAVOTANA FAHAFAHANA	1. D.R.M.; [abbreviation of "Democratic Republic of Madagascar"]: 2. D. R.; [abbreviation of "Didier Ratsiraka"]: 3. DEMOCRATIC REPUBLIC OF MADAGASCAR; 4. HOMELAND REVOLUTION LIBERTY
Madagascar (President) (reverse)	1976–93	TANINDRAZANA TOLOM-PIAVOTANA FAHAFAHANA	HOMELAND REVOLUTION LIBERTY
Madagascar (President) (obverse)	1993–96	1. R.M.; [abbreviation of "Repoblikan'i Madagasikara"]: 2. Z.A.; [abbreviation of "Zafy Albert"]: 3. REPOBLIKAN'I MADAGASIKARA; 4. TANINDRAZANA FAHAFAHANA FAHAMARINANA	1. R.M.; [abbreviation of "Republic of Madagascar"]: 2. Z.A.; [abbreviation of "Zafy Albert"]: 3. REPUBLIC OF MADAGASCAR; 4. HOMELAND LIBERTY TRUTH
Madagascar (President) (reverse)	1993–96	TANINDRAZANA FAHAFAHANA FAHAMARINANA	HOMELAND LIBERTY TRUTH
Madagascar (President) (obverse)	1998–2002	1. R.M.; [abbreviation of "Repoblikan'i Madagasikara"]: 2. D.R.; [abbreviation of "Didier Ratsiraka"]: 3. REPOBLIKAN'I MADAGASIKARA; 4. TANINDRAZANA FAHAFAHANA FANDROSOANA	1. R.M.; [abbreviation of "Republic of Madagascar"]: 2. D.R.; [abbreviation of "Didier Ratsiraka"]: 3. REPUBLIC OF MADAGASCAR; 4. HOMELAND LIBERTY DEVELOPMENT
Madagascar (President) (reverse)	1998–2002	TANINDRAZANA FAHAFAHANA FANDROSOANA	HOMELAND LIBERTY DEVELOPMENT

== Malay ==
Flag	Dates used	Malay text	English translation
Federal Territory (Malaysia)	2006–present	BERSEKUTU BERTAMBAH MUTU [also written in Jawi script]	UNITY IS STRENGTH
Kedah	1912–present	نڬري قدح	State of Kedah
Malaysia (Raja Permaisuri Agong)	–present	BERSEKUTU BERTAMBAH MUTU [also written in Jawi script]	UNITY IS STRENGTH
Malaysia (Yang di-Pertuan Agong)	–present	BERSEKUTU BERTAMBAH MUTU [also written in Jawi script]	UNITY IS STRENGTH
Putrajaya	2001–present	BERSEKUTU BERTAMBAH MUTU [also written in Jawi script]	UNITY IS STRENGTH

== Maltese ==
Flag	Dates used	Maltese text	English translation
Malta (President)	1988–present	REPUBBLIKA TA' MALTA	REPUBLIC OF MALTA
Victoria, Gozo	–present	R [abbreviation of "Rabat"]	R [abbreviation of "Rabat", the Maltese-language place name for Victoria]

== Mari ==
Flag	Dates used	Mari text	English translation
Mari ASSR	1978–90	МАРИЙ АССР	MARI ASSR

== Marshallese ==
Flag	Dates used	Marshallese text	English translation
Bikini Atoll	1987–present	MEN OTEMJEJ REJ ILO BEIN ANIJ	EVERYTHING IS IN THE HANDS OF GOD

== Massachusett ==
Flag	Dates used	Massachusett text	English translation
Bridgewater, Massachusetts	–present	1. NUNKATATESET; 2. SAUGHTUCKET	1. 2.

== Mongolian ==
Flag	Dates used	Mongolian text	English translation
Bulgan Province	–present	БУЛГАН	BULGAN
Dornod Province	–present	ДОРНОД	DORNOD
Dundgovi Province	–present	ДУНДГОВЬ	DUNDGOVI
Govi-Altai Province	–present	ГОВЬ-АЛТАЙ	GOVI-ALTAI
Khentii Province	–present	ХЭНТИЙ	KHENTII
Ömnögovi Province	–present	ӨМНӨГОВЬ	ӦMNӦGOVI
Sükhbaatar Province	–present	1. СҮХБААТАР АЙМАГ; 2. ᠰᠦᠬᠡᠪᠠᠭᠠᠲᠤᠷᠠᠶᠢᠮᠠᠭ	1. SÜKHBAATAR PROVINCE; 2. Sükhbaatar Province
Tuvan People's Republic	1926–30	ᠪᠦᠭᠦᠳᠡ ᠨᠠᠶᠢᠷᠠᠮᠳᠠᠬᠤ ᠲᠢᠸᠠ ᠠᠷᠠᠳ ᠤᠯᠤᠰ	Tuvan People's Republic

== Ndebele ==
Flag	Dates used	Ndebele text	English translation
Bulawayo	–present	SI YE PAMBILI	LET US GO FORWARD

== Norwegian ==
Flag	Dates used	Norwegian text	English translation
Oslo	–present	OSLO	OSLO

== Ossetian ==
Flag	Dates used	Ossetian text	English translation
North Ossetian ASSR	1978–90	ЦӔГАТ ИРЫСТОНЫ АССР	NORTH OSSETIAN ASSR

== Pashto ==
Flag	Dates used	Pashto text	English translation
Afghanistan	2013–present	1. ١٣٤٨; 2. افغانستان	1. 1298; 2. Afghanistan
Afghanistan	1930–73	١٣٤٨	1348
Afghanistan	1978–80	1. خلق; 2. دافغانستان دمکراتی جمهوریت	1. Masses; 2. Democratic Republic of Afghanistan
Afghanistan	1992–96	دا افغانستان اسلامی دولت	Islamic State of Afghanistan
Afghanistan	2001–02	دا افغانستان اسلامی دولت	Islamic State of Afghanistan
Afghanistan	2002–04	1. ١٣٤٨; 2. دا افغانستان اسلامی دولت	1. 1298; 2. Islamic State of Afghanistan

== Polish ==
Flag	Dates used	Polish text	English translation
Gmina Babice	–present	B [abbreviation of "Babice"]	
Gmina Blizanów	–present	B [abbreviation of "Blizanów"]	
Gmina Kije	–present	G K [abbreviation of "Gmina Kije"]	K C [abbreviation of Kije Commune"]

== Portuguese ==
Flag	Dates used	Portuguese text	English translation
Bissau	?–present	CIDADE DE BISSAU	CITY OF BISSAU
Brazil	1889–present	ORDEM E PROGRESSO	ORDER AND PROGRESS
Brazil (President)	1907–68	1. ESTADOS UNIDOS DO BRASIL; 2. 15 de Novembro de 1889	1. UNITED STATES OF BRAZIL; 2. 15 November 1889
Brazil (President)	1968–present	1. REPÚBLICA FEDERATIVA DO BRASIL; 2. 15 de Novembro de 1889	1. FEDERATIVE REPUBLIC OF BRAZIL; 2. 15 November 1889
Brazil (Vice-President)	1968–present	1. REPÚBLICA FEDERATIVA DO BRASIL; 2. 15 de Novembro de 1889	1. FEDERATIVE REPUBLIC OF BRAZIL; 2. 15 November 1889
Community of Portuguese Language Countries	1996–present	C P L P [abbreviation of "Comunidade dos Países de Língua Portuguesa"]	C P L C [abbreviation of "Community of Portuguese Language Countries"]
Curitiba	?–present	1. CURITIBA; 2. 29-3 1693	1. CURITIBA; 2. 29-3 1693 [29 March 1693]
Espírito Santo	1947–present	TRABALHA E CONFIA	WORK AND TRUST
Gabú	?–present	VILA DE NOVA LAMEGO	TOWN OF NOVA LAMEGO
Junqueirópolis	?–present	JUNQUEIRÓPOLIS	
Lisbon	1940–present	MUI NOBRE E SEMPRE LEAL CIDADE DE LISBOA	MOST NOBLE AND ETERNALLY LOYAL CITY OF LISBON
Municipality of Macau	1975–1999	CIDADE DO NOME DE DEUS DE MACAU NÃO HÁ OUTRA MAIS LEAL	CITY OF THE NAME OF GOD MACAU, THERE IS NONE MORE LOYAL
Portuguese Macau	1976–99	GOVERNO DE MACAU	GOVERNMENT OF MACAU
Maputo	?–present	POVO UNIDO E SOBERANO	PEOPLE UNITED AND SOVEREIGN
Minas Gerais	1965–present	LIBERTAS QUÆ SERA TAMEN	FREEDOM ALBEIT LATE
Mozambique (President)	1975–90	REPÚBLICA POPULAR DE MOÇAMBIQUE	PEOPLE'S REPUBLIC OF MOZAMBIQUE
Mozambique (President)	1990–present	REPÚBLICA DE MOÇAMBIQUE	REPUBLIC OF MOZAMBIQUE
Paraíba	1965–present	NEGO	I DENY
Paraná	1947–present	PARANÁ	
Piauí	1922–present	13 DE MARÇO DE 1823	13 MARCH 1823
Porto	?–present	ANTIGA, MUI NOBRE, SEMPRE LEAL E INVICTA	OLD, MOST NOBLE, ALWAYS LOYAL AND UNDEFEATED
Autonomous Region of Príncipe	?–present	1. REPÚBLICA DEMOCRÁTICA DE S.TOMÉ E PRÍNCIPE; 2. UNIDADE DISCIPLINA TRABALHO	1. DEMOCRATIC REPUBLIC OF S.TOMÉ AND PRÍNCIPE; 2. UNITY DISCIPLINE WORK
Rio de Janeiro	1891–present	1. 9 ABRIL 1892; 2. ESTADO do RIO de JANEIRO	1. 9 APRIL 1892; 2. STATE of RIO de JANEIRO
Rio Grande do Sul	1966–present	1. REPÚBLICA RIO-GRANDENSE; 2. 20 DE SETEMBRO DE 1835; 3. LIBERDADE IGUALDADE HUMANIDADE	1. RIOGRANDENSE REPUBLIC; 2. 20 SEPTEMBER 1835; 3. LIBERTY EQUALITY HUMANITY
Santa Catarina	1953–present	1. 17 DE NOVEMBRO DE 1889; 2. ESTADO DE STA. CATARINA	1. 17 NOVEMBER 1889; 2. STATE OF STA. CATERINA
São Tomé	?–present	CIDADE DE S.TOMÉ	CITY OF S.TOMÉ

== Rapa ==
Flag	Dates used	Rapa text	English translation
Rapa Iti	–present	RAPA	RAPA

== Romanian ==
=== Romania ===
Flag	Dates used	Romanian text	English translation
Brașov	1992–present	BRAȘOV	BRAȘOV
Bucharest	1990–present	PATRIA ȘI DREPTUL MEU	THE HOMELAND AND MY RIGHT
Constanța	1997–present	1. CONSTANTA; 2. TOMIS; 3. CONSTANTIANA	1. CONSTANTA; 2. TOMIS; 3. CONSTANTIANA
Romania	1948–65	RSR [abbreviation of "Republica Socialista România"]	SRR [abbreviation of "Socialist Republic of Romania"]
Romania	1965–89	REPUBLICA SOCIALISTA ROMÂNIA	SOCIALIST REPUBLIC OF ROMANIA

=== Moldova ===
Flag	Dates used	Romanian text	English translation
Moldavian Democratic Republic	1917–18	REPUBLICA DEMOCRATICĂ MOLDOVENEASCĂ ȘI INDEPENDENTĂ	MOLDOVAN DEMOCRATIC AND INDEPENDENT REPUBLIC
Sfatul Țării	1917–18	SFATUL ȚĂRII	NATIONAL COUNCIL
Moldavian ASSR	1925–32	P. A. C. C. M. [abbreviation of "Република Аутономэ Советикэ Cочиалистэ Молдовеняскэ"]	M. A. S. S. R. [abbreviation of "Moldavian Autonomous Soviet Socialist Republic"]
Moldavian ASSR	1937–38	1. RSSU; 2. RASS Moldovenească	1. USSR; [abbreviation of "Ukrainian Soviet Socialist Republic"]: 2. Moldavian ASSR
Moldavian ASSR	1938–40	1. РССУ; 2. РАСС Молдовеняскэ	1. USSR; [abbreviation of "Ukrainian Soviet Socialist Republic"]: 2. Moldavian ASSR
Moldavian SSR	1941–52	РССM [abbreviation of "Република Советикэ Сочиалистэ Молдовеняскэ]	MSSR [abbreviation of "Moldavian Soviet Socialist Republic"]

== Sakha ==
Flag	Dates used	Sakha text	English translation
Yakut ASSR	1978–91	САХА АССР	SAKHA ASSR

== Sanskrit ==
Flag	Dates used	Sanskrit text	English translation
Jakarta	–present	JAYA RAYA	VICTORIOUS AND GREAT
Papua	–present	KARYA SWADAYA	WORK WITH ONE'S OWN MIGHT
West Kalimantan	–present	AKÇAYA	IMMORTAL

== Serbian ==
Flag	Dates used	Serbian text	English translation
Čačak	–present	1. 1908; 2. ЧАЧАК; 3. 1815; 4. ГРАД ЧАЧАК	1. 1908; 2. ČAČAK; 3. 1815; 4. CITY OF ČAČAK
Knić	–present	ОПШТИНА КНИЋ	MUNICIPALITY OF KNIĆ
Principality of Montenegro	1861–1910	H.I [abbreviation of "Никола I"]	N.I [abbreviation of "Nicholas I"
Niš	–present	HИШ	NIŠ
Palilula, Belgrade	–present	1830	
Pirot	–present	ПИРОТ	PIROT
Rača, Bratislava	–present	1. 1489; 2. РАЧА; 3. ОПШТИНА РАЧА	1. 1489; 2. RAČA; 3. MUNICIPALITY OF RAČA
Ražanj	–present	ОПШТИНА РАЖАЊ	MUNICIPALITY OF RAŽANJ
Republika Srpska (President)	–present	1. PC; [abbreviation of "Република Српска"]: 2. РЕПУБЛИКА СРПСКА; 3. REPUBLIKA SRPSKA	1. RS; [abbreviation of "Republika Srpska"; 2. REPUBLIKA SRPSKA; 3. REPUBLIKA SRPSKA

== Sinhala ==
Flag	Dates used	Sinhala text	English translation
Central Province, Sri Lanka	1987–present	මධ්‍යම පළාත	Central Province

== Slovak ==
Flag	Dates used	Slovak text	English translation
Slovak Republic (President)	1939–45	VERNÍ SEBE SVORNE NAPRED	FAITHFUL TO OURSELVES TOGETHER AHEAD

== Sotho ==
Flag	Dates used	Sotho text	English translation
Lesotho (royal standard)	1966–present	KHOTSO PULA NALA	PEACE RAIN PROSPERITY

== Sundanese ==
Flag	Dates used	Sundanese text	English translation
West Java	–present	GEMAH RIPAH REPEH RAPIH	PROSPERITY IS WITH THE PEACEFUL AND UNITED PEOPLE

== Swahili ==
Flag	Dates used	Swahili text	English translation
Mombasa County	2013–present	UTANGAMANO KWA MAENDELEO	UNITY FOR DEVELOPMENT
Nyandarua County	–present	PAMOJA TUJIJENGE	LET US BUILD TOGETHER
Tanzania (President)	–present	UHURU NA EMOJA	FREEDOM AND UNITY

== Tahitian ==
Flag	Dates used	Tahitian text	English translation
Moorea-Maiao	–present	MOOREA	

== Tajik ==
Flag	Dates used	Tajik text	English translation
Khujand	–present	ХУҶАНД	KHUJAND
Tajik SSR	1937–40	RSS Toçikiston	Tajik SSR
Tajik SSR	1940–53	PCC Точикистон	Tajik SSR

== Tamil ==
Flag	Dates used	Tamil text	English translation
Central Province, Sri Lanka	1987–present	மத்திய மாகாணம்	Central Province

== Ternate ==
Flag	Dates used	Ternate text	English translation
North Maluku	–present	1. MARIMOI NGONE FUTURU; 2. 1999	1. UNITED WE ARE STRONG; 2. 1999

== Thai ==
Flag	Dates used	Thai text	English translation
Bangkok	–present	กรุงเทพมหานคร	Bangkok [Krung Thep Maha Nakhon]
Royal Thai Marine Corps	1966–present	ราชนาวิกโยธิน	Royal Marines [Rajanavikayothin]
Royal Thai Volunteer Regiment	1967–68	กรมทหารอาสาสมัคร	Volunteer Regiment [Krom Thahan Arsa Samak]

== Tigrinya ==
Flag	Dates used	Tigrinya text	English translation
Eritrea (President)	1993–present	ሃገረ ኤርትራ	State of Eritrea

== Tswana ==
Flag	Dates used	Tswana text	English translation
Botswana (President)	1966–present	PULA	RAIN

== Tuamotuan ==
Flag	Dates used	Tuamotuan text	English translation
Hao (French Polynesia)	–present	HAO	
Reao and Pukaruha	–present	1. REAO; 2. PUKARUHA	

== Turkish ==
Flag	Dates used	Turkish text	English translation
Centar Župa Municipality	–present	Merkez Jupa Belediyesi	Centrar Župa Municipality

== Turkmen ==
Flag	Dates used	Turkmen text	English translation
Turkmen SSR	1937–40	TSSR [abbreviation of "Türkmenistan Sowet Sotsialistik Respublikasy"]	TSSR [abbreviation of "Turkmen Soviet Socialist Republic"]
Turkmen SSR	1940–53	ТCCP [abbreviation of "Түркменистан Совет Социалистик Республикасы"]	TSSR [abbreviation of "Turkmen Soviet Socialist Republic"]
Turkmenistan (President)	–present	1. TÜRKMENISTANYŇ; 2. PREZIDENTI	1. TURKMENISTAN; 2. PRESIDENT

== Tuvaluan ==
Flag	Dates used	Tuvaluan text	English translation
Tuvalu (state flag)	1978–present	TUVALU MO TE ATUA	TUVALU FOR THE ALMIGHTY
Tuvalu	1995–97	TUVALU MO TE ATUA	TUVALU FOR THE ALMIGHTY
Tuvalu	1976–78	TUVALU MO TE ATUA	TUVALU FOR THE ALMIGHTY
Tuvalu (Governor-General)	1978–present	TUVALU	

== Tuvan ==
Flag	Dates used	Tuvan text	English translation
Tuvan ASSR	1978–92	ТЫВА АССР	TUVAN ASSR
Tuvan People's Republic	1930–33	ТAR [abbreviation of "Tьвa Arat Respuвlik"]	TPR [abbreviation of "Tuvan People's Republic"]
Tuvan People's Republic	1933–41	1. ТAR; [abbreviation of "Tьвa Arat Respuвlik"]: 2. PYGY TELEGEJNIŅ PROLETARLARЬ POLGAŞ TARLATKAN ARATTARЬ KATTЬƵЬŅAR!	1. TPR; [abbreviation of "Tuvan People's Republic"]: 2. WORKERS OF THE WORLD UNITE YOU HAVE NOTHING TO LOSE BUT YOUR CHAINS!
Tuvan People's Republic	1941–43	ТAR [abbreviation of "Tьвa Arat Respuвlik"]	TPR [abbreviation of "Tuvan People's Republic"]
Tuvan People's Republic	1943–44	ТAP [abbreviation of "Тыва Арат Республик]	TPR [abbreviation of "Tuvan People's Republic"]

== Udmurt ==
Flag	Dates used	Udmurt text	English translation
Udmurt ASSR	1978–90	УДМУРТ АССР	UDMURT ASSR

== Ukrainian ==
Flag	Dates used	Ukrainian text	English translation
Cherkasy	–present	ЧЕРКАСИ	CHERKASY
Dnipropetrovsk	2013–present	ДНІПРОПЕТРОВСЬК	DNIPROPETROVSK
Kherson	–present	1778	
Kropyvnytskyi	–present	CЄ [abbreviation of "Святий Єлизавети"]	SE [abbreviation of "Saint Elizabeth"]
Luhansk	–present	1. E 2. 1795	1. E 2. 1795
Makhnovshchina	1918–21	ВЛАСТЬ РОЖДАЕТ ПАРАЗИТОВ. ДА ЗДРАВСТВУЕТ АНАРХИЯ!	POWER BREEDS PARASITES. LONG LIVE ANARCHY!
Mariupol	–present	1. МАРІУПОЛЬ; 2. 1778	1. MARIUPOL; 2. 1778
Moldavian ASSR	1937–38	1. УРСР; [abbreviation of "Українська Радянська Соціалістична Республіка"]: 2. Молдавська АРСР	1. USSR; [abbreviation of "Ukrainian Soviet Socialist Republic"]: 2. Moldavian ASSR
Moldavian ASSR	1938–40	1. УРСР; [abbreviation of "Українська Радянська Соціалістична Республіка"]: 2. Молдавська АРСР	1. USSR; [abbreviation of "Ukrainian Soviet Socialist Republic"]: 2. Moldavian ASSR
Poltava	–present	ПОЛ†АВА	POLTAVA
Ukrainian SSR	1929–37	У.C.P.Р. [abbreviation of "Українська Соціалістична Радянська Республіка"]	U.S.S.R. [abbreviation of "Ukrainian Socialist Soviet Republic"]
Ukrainian SSR	1937–49	УРСР [abbreviation of "Українська Радянська Соціалістична Республіка"]	USSR [abbreviation of "Ukrainian Soviet Socialist Republic"]
Zaporizhia Oblast	–present	ЗаПОРіЗЬКа ОБЛаСТЬ	ZAPORIZHIA OBLAST

== Urdu ==
Flag	Dates used	Urdu text	English translation
Pakistan (president)	1956–67; 1974–present	پاكستان	Pakistan

== Uzbek ==
Flag	Dates used	Uzbek text	English translation
Karakalpak ASSR	1937–52	1. ЎЗБЕКИСТОН ССР; 2. КОРАКАЛПОҒИСТОН АССРн	1. UZBEK SSR; 2. KARAKALPAK ASSR
Karakalpak ASSR	1978–92	КОРАКАЛПОҒИСТОН АССРн	KARAKALPAK ASSR
Uzbek SSR	1937–41	OZBEKISTAN CCP	UZBEK SSR
Uzbek SSR	1941–53	Ўзбекистон CCP	Uzbek SSR

== Vietnamese ==
Flag	Dates used	Vietnamese text	English translation
Nguyễn dynasty	1885–90	大南	Great South
South Vietnam (President)	1955–63	TIẾT-TRỰC TÂM-HƯ	DUTY AND SACRIFICE
South Vietnam (President)	1965–75	TIẾT-TRỰC TÂM-HƯ	DUTY AND SACRIFICE

== Welsh ==
Flag	Dates used	Welsh text	English translation
Wales	1953–59	Y DDRAIG GOCH DDYRY CYCHWYN	THE RED DRAGON INSPIRES ACTION
