= Emblem of the Moldavian Autonomous Soviet Socialist Republic =

The emblem of the Moldavian Autonomous Soviet Socialist Republic was an official emblem used in the Soviet Union in the early 20th century. It underwent a number of changes over time.

== History ==
=== Mid-1920s ===
The first coat of arms was adopted in 1925, when the Congress of the Soviets of Ukraine approved the Constitution of the Moldavian ASSR on 10 May 1925. Thus, in section VII, article 48, the constitution states that the coat of arms was "established by the Central Executive Committee and confirmed by the Moldavian Central Executive Committee".

In a meeting with the presidium of the Central Executive Committee of the Moldavian ASSR, held on 4 September 1925, it was decided that the organizational department should organize a contest for designing the coat of arms and state flag of the Moldavian ASSR. The projects were to be evaluated by a committee composed of representatives of the Central Executive Committee, of the Agitprop, of the Popular Commissariat of Education and of the Council of Trade Unions in Moldova. Prizes worth 50 rubles for first place, 30 rubles for second and 20 rubles for third were offered.

Due to the lack of surviving documents, the result of the contest and the proposed designs are not known. A description of the selected design (of which no illustration has been found) is included in a letter from 21 July 1927 of the permanent representative of the Moldavian ASSR near the Government of the Ukrainian SSR, Malcikov. It states "from the outside, the coat of arms of the Moldavian ASSR shows a wreath of maize stalks and grapes, with a light blue interior over which is displayed a white label. The label contains the map of the Moldavian ASSR, united with Bessarabia. At the bottom of the map, in the center of the wreath, is rising a sun spreading shining rays. On the sun is represented a red star. The wreath is festooned all over with the slogan 'Workers of the world, unite!' in three languages: Russian, Ukrainian and Moldavian." Therefore, the arms contained irredentist symbolism.

On 21 September 1925, the deputy presidium of the Central Executive Committee of the Moldavian ASSR made the following amendments:

- Where the wreath arms join are to be written the letters "USSR", the abbreviation of the Ukrainian Soviet Socialist Republic
- The slogan "Workers of the world, unite!" was to be arranged as follows: in Moldovan at the top end of ribbon, to the right and left; in Ukrainian in the middle, to the right and left; in Russian at the bottom.
- The star was to be located at the top of the coat of arms; the diameter of the star was to be smaller and its corners sharper.
- The sun rays were to be prolonged to the end of the blue field
- The proportion between maize and wheat ears was to be altered, and leaves were to be painted to look more like grape leaves.
- The proportion between the territories of the Moldavian ASSR on the left and right banks of the Dniester River was to be altered.
- The part of the Moldavian ASSR on the left bank of the Dniester was to be colored in red, with the part on the right bank to be colored in black with diagonal red lines
- The letters along the territory were to be arranged so that the letters "R.A.S." were on the right bank of the Dniester, and "S.M." on the left bank.
- The hammer and sickle was to be given the same shape as the one in the coat of arms of the Soviet Union.

The chosen coat of arms, together with the amendments above, was approved by the presidium of the Central Executive Committee on 19 October 1925. A sum of 45 rubles was offered for making the corrections, and after 10 November, another 30 rubles for the execution of the drawings of the flag and coat of arms.

The approval of the Central Executive Committee of Ukraine was delayed. On 23 February 1926, the Regional Moldovan Office of the Ukrainian Communist Party ordered that the map of the Moldavian ASSR was to be removed entirely from the design, and replaced with the hammer and sickle. However, on 2 November 1926, the office deferred the problem of removing the map to the Central Committee of the Party.

In a letter from 1927, Malcikov explained his belief of the usefulness of keeping the map of the Moldavian ASSR, including Bessarabia on the coat of arms, and he proposed other minor changes. Instead of "USSR", he suggested "USRR" should be used (the Ukrainian Soviet Socialist Republic's abbreviation in Ukrainian, instead of Russian), and suggested the names "Moldavian ASSR", "Odessa", "Chişinău" and "Dniester" should be written in the Ukrainian and Moldovan form on the map, instead of the Russian one.

It is not known which suggestions were eventually approved, and no graphical representation of such a coat of arms has been found.

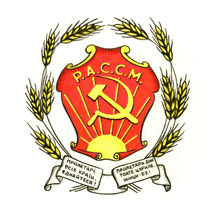
Coat of arms of MASSR (1929 - 1938)

=== Late 1920s ===
From 1927 to 1929, a new coat of arms of the Moldavian ASSR was developed and adopted, similar to the emblem of the Ukrainian SSR between 1919 and 1929. The latter is described as "[consisting] of the golden hammer and sickle on a red background, in the rays of the sun, surrounded by a wreath of wheat ears and the inscription in Russian and Ukrainian: 1. R.S.S.U. and 2. Workers of the world, unite!". In the Moldavian version, "R.S.S.U." was replaced by "R.A.S.S.M." and the communist slogan was written in Ukrainian and Moldovan.

=== Late 1930s ===
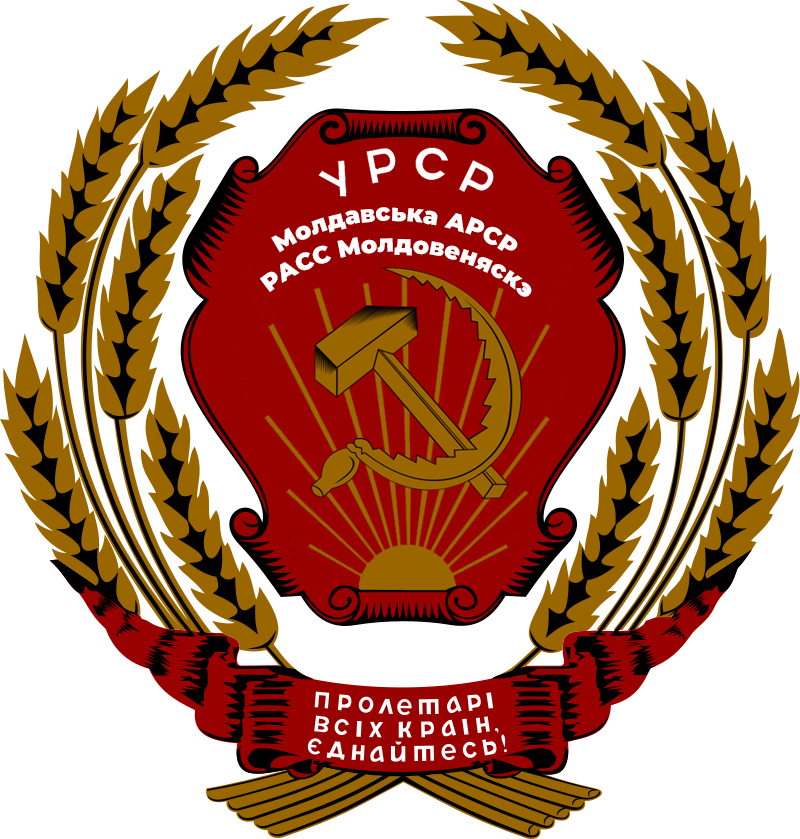
Coat of arms of MASSR (1938 - 1940)

On 12 July 1936, the draft of the new Constitution of the Soviet Union appeared in the newspapers. It was approved locally by the VIIth extraordinary Congress of the soviets of the Moldavian ASSR, whose work started on 18 November 1936 at Tiraspol. The Congress established a committee that would elaborate the future Moldavian Constitution. On 5 December 1936 the Constitution of the Soviet Union became effective. A month later, the VIIth extraordinary Congress of the soviets of the Moldavian ASSR resumed its work and on 6 January 1937 adopted the new Constitution of the Moldavian ASSR.

According to the Constitution, the coat of arms of the autonomous republic was supposed to coincide with the soviet socialist republic that it was part of. The only additions were the name of the Moldavian ASSR and the communist slogan "Workers of the world, unite!" in Moldavian and Ukrainian on the ribbon. Chapter X of the new Constitution is titled "The coat of arms, the flag, the capital". As stated in Article 111: "The coat of arms of the Moldavian Autonomous Soviet Socialist Republic is the coat of arms of the Ukrainian SSR, which is composed of a golden hammer and sickle on a red background in the rays of the sun, surrounded by wheat ears, with the inscriptions 'RSSU' and 'Workers of the world, unite!' in the Ukrainian and Moldavian languages, with the addition, under 'RSSU' inscription, in smaller letters, of the inscription 'Moldavian ASSR' in the Ukrainian and Moldavian languages."

This coat of arms ceased to be valid following the disbanding of the Moldavian ASSR on 2 August 1940.

== Bibliography ==
- Silviu Andrieş-Tabac, Heraldica teritorială a Basarabiei şi Transnistriei, Ed. Museum, Chişinău, 1998, p. 116–119.

== See also ==
- Flag of the Moldavian ASSR
- Emblem of the Moldavian SSR
- Coat of arms of Moldova
