= Emblem of the Moldavian Soviet Socialist Republic =

- Armiger: Moldavian Soviet Socialist Republic
- Adopted: 10 February 1941
- Crest: Red star
- Shield: Rising sun with hammer and sickle
- Supporters: Wheat, corn, grape and fruit
- Motto: "Workers of the world, unite!" Пролетарь дин тоате цэриле, уници-вэ! (Romanian in Moldovan Cyrillic); Пролетарии всех стран, соединяйтесь! (Russian)

The coat of arms of the Moldavian Soviet Socialist Republic was adopted on 10 February 1941 by the government of the Moldavian Soviet Socialist Republic (Moldavian SSR). The coat of arms is based on the coat of arms of the Soviet Union. It shows symbols of agriculture, an outer rim featuring wheat, corn, grapes and clover. The red banner bears the Soviet Union state motto ("Workers of the world, unite!") in both the Romanian language (in Moldovan Cyrillic) and the Russian language. In Romanian, it was initially "Пролетарь дин тоате цэриле, униць-вэ!"; then, from the 1950s "Пролетарь дин тоате цэриле, уници-вэ!". Both are written in the Latin alphabet as "Proletari din toate țările, uniți-vă!". The acronym MSSR is shown only in Romanian in Moldovan Cyrillic ("РССМ"). The emblem was replaced on 3 November 1990 by the present coat of arms of Moldova. Currently, the unrecognized breakaway state of Transnistria uses a similar state emblem.

== History ==
=== Provisional emblem ===
A provisional emblem for the Moldavian SSR was created immediately after the formation of the republic on 28 June 1940. The emblem was similar to that of the Ukrainian SSR.

=== Official emblem ===
On 10 February 1941, the Supreme Council of the Moldavian SSR of the first convocation adopted the Constitution of the Moldavian SSR, in article 122 of which the State Emblem of the Moldavian SSR was described:

The State Emblem of the Moldavian Soviet Socialist Republic is a picture of a sickle and hammer in the sun and framed by corn ears and corn cobs with a garland of bunches of grapes and fruits, with inscriptions on the red ribbon: at the bottom "RSSM", on the right side in Russian "Пролетарии всех стран, соединяйтесь!", and on the left – in Moldavian language [Romanian] is the inscription "Пролетарь дин тоате цэриле, униць-вэ!". At the top of the coat of arms is a five-pointed star.

— Constitution of the Moldavian Soviet Socialist Republic (1941), Article 122

The emblem was created by Eugen Nikitovich Merega, whose merits in this regard have been recognized by the Communist Party Leadership and Bureau of the Union of Artists of Moldova on 29 June 1971. His creation has been used almost unchanged until 1990.

The text was slightly refined in 1943, when the constitution was printed for the public.

Coat of arms of Soviet Socialist Republic of Moldova and Republic of Moldova (1990–1991), today the coat of arms of Moldova

==== First revision ====
In 1957, the spelling of the Cyrillic alphabet of the supposed Moldovan language (the name given to the Romanian language in Moldova at the time) was changed, thus, the word 'unite' (униць-вэ) was changed, being spelled with и instead of ь (уници-вэ).

The 1978 Constitution of the Moldavian SSR, which was adopted on 15 April 1978, gives more details regarding the inscription on the emblem. The emblem is described in the article 166 of the constitution.

==== Minor revision ====
In 1981, painter Alexei A. Colîbneac improved the emblem's graphics in some respects. Instead of highlights and shadows, the emblem used single tones. Black contours became brown and the medium and big rays of the sun were made of the same length.

The amendments of 1981 were mentioned in the "Regulations on the emblem of the republic", adopted on 7 May, same year, by ukase of the Presidium of Supreme Soviet of the Moldavian SSR: "the colored image of the coat of arms of Moldavian Soviet Socialist Republic shows golden sickle and hammer, sun and ears, a gold line around the red star, red ribbon and vegetables, golden ochre maize cobs and strains, fruits and grapes, green leaves of vines and fruits; the contour of the elements is brown."

On 7 August 1981 the Soviet of the Ministers of Moldavian SSR approved the "Guidelines for implementing the Regulations on the state emblem of Moldavian SSR".

This emblem was replaced by a new coat of arms created by Gheorghe Vrabie, on November 3, 1990.

== Symbolism ==
On 21 April 1965, the director of the "E. M. Rusev" Institute stated in a written reply to G. F. Savcenco, the head of the Office of the Supreme Soviet Presidium of Moldavian SSR, that the elements of the national emblem means the following:

- "The Red Star above the emblem is the guiding star of all humanity building communism;
- The Hammer and sickle signifies the unbreakable alliance between workers and peasants of our country;
- The sun that rises is the symbol of the bright communism dawn, which is more and more obvious;
- The wreath of ears, cobs of maize, grape leaves and grapes and apples is reflecting the fertility of the Moldavian Republic, which by the will of the Party and the selfless work of its inhabitants is becoming the thriving orchard of the Soviet Union;
- The Communist slogan: "Workers of all countries, unite!" [...] talks about the internationalism of the Moldavian people".

Another interpretation of the emblem of Moldavian SSR indicates the following symbols:

- "The rising sun represents the break of dawn, the horizon of the new communist era;
- The cobs of maize and the ears reflect the republic's economy, abundance of bread, vegetables, fruit and grapes;
- As a summoning bell, as a torch that illuminates the way of liberation from the yoke of oppressors for all the people of the world, there echoes the inscription "Workers of all countries, unite!";
- The five-pointed star states that the peaceful socialist work (another draft says "peaceful creative work") of workers, peasants and intelligence is guarded by the Soviet Army".

The "Regulations on the emblem of the republic" of 1981 states that "The State Emblem of Moldavian Soviet Socialist Republic is a symbol of state sovereignty, of unbreakable alliance between workers, peasants and intellectuals, of friendship and brotherhood of the working people of all nationalities in the republic, which are building the communism."

== Gallery ==
Emblem of the Moldavian Soviet Socialist Republic (1940–1941)

Emblem of the Moldavian Soviet Socialist Republic (1941–1957)

Emblem of the Moldavian Soviet Socialist Republic (1957–1981)

Emblem of the Moldavian Soviet Socialist Republic (1981–1990)

== See also ==
- Coat of arms of Moldova
- Coat of arms of Transnistria
- Coat of arms of the Moldavian Autonomous Soviet Socialist Republic
- Flag of the Moldavian Soviet Socialist Republic
- Emblem of the Socialist Republic of Romania
