= Vrabie =

Vrabie is a Romanian surname meaning "sparrow". Notable people with the surname include:

- Gheorghe Vrabie (folklorist) (1908–1991), Romanian, author, folklorist and literary historian
- Gheorghe Vrabie (1939–2016), Moldovan artist
- Vitalie Vrabie (born 1964), Moldovan politician
