= Flag of the Moldavian Autonomous Soviet Socialist Republic =

Flag of the MASSR (1925–1932)

Flag of the MASSR (1938–1938)

Flag of the MASSR (1938–1940)

The flag of the Moldavian Autonomous Soviet Socialist Republic was created in 1925, when the All-Ukrainian Congress of Soviets approved the Constitution of the Moldavian ASSR, on 10 May. Thus, in Section VII, Article 48, the Constitution stipulated: "The Moldavian ASSR has its own state emblem and flag, set by the Moldavian Central Executive Committee and confirmed by the Ukrainian Central Executive Committee". On 4 September 1925, the Presidium of the Central Executive Committee of the Moldavian ASSR discussed the issue "the contest for drafting the emblem and flag and its jury, consisting of representatives of top party bodies and authorities of the Republic". On 21 September 1925, the small Presidium of the Central Executive Committee, headed by I. N. Chior-Ianachi, resumed "the examining of the state emblem and flag of the Moldavian ASSR". Concerning the flag, the Presidium decided:

a) the hammer and sickle should be identical with the ones depicted on the emblem of the USSR,

b) the letters Р. А. С. С. М. (Moldovan initials of Moldavian ASSR in Cyrillic) should be placed in the top right corner, arc-shaped with ends downward,

c) the maize and wheat ear should wrapped by vine leaves, so that they would hang in the middle.

After this, the 19 October 1925, the Central Executive Committee of the Moldavian ASSR adopted the drafts of the state emblem and the flag of Moldavian ASSR.

On 6 January 1938, the 7th extraordinary Congress of Soviets of the Moldavian ASSR adopted the second Moldavian Constitution, the flag being described as:

Art 112. State Flag of the Moldavian ASSR is the flag of Ukrainian SSR, which consists of a red cloth, which has on the upper left corner, near the hoist, a gold hammer and sickle and the letters "USSR" in Ukrainian and Moldovan, and below the "USSR" initials, with a smaller font, "Moldavian ASSR" in Ukrainian and Moldovan.

This flag went out of use on 2 August 1940, when the Moldavian ASSR was abolished; its territory being divided between the newly created Moldavian Soviet Socialist Republic and the Ukrainian Soviet Socialist Republic.

== Bibliography ==
- Silviu Andrieş-Tabac, Heraldica teritorială a Basarabiei şi Transnistriei, Ed. Museum, Chişinău, 1998, p. 116 - 119.
- V. Lomanţov Drapelele Moldovei.
- Flags of Moldavian ASSR at vexillographia.ru

== See also ==
- Coat of arms of the Moldavian Autonomous Soviet Socialist Republic
- Flag of the Moldavian SSR
