= Emblem of Transnistria =

State emblem of the Pridnestrovian Moldavian Republic

Versions
- Using initials
- Armiger: Pridnestrovian Moldavian Republic
- Adopted: 2 September 1991 (de facto); 18 July 2000 (de jure)
- Crest: Red star
- Shield: hammer and sickle, Rising sun above the Dniester river
- Supporters: Wheat, corn, grape and fruit
- Motto: Russian: Приднестровская Молдавская Республика; Romanian: Република Молдовеняскэ Нистрянэ (in Moldovan Cyrillic); Ukrainian: Придністровська Молдавська Республіка
- Other elements: Red star, rising sun
- Earlier version

Transnistria, a breakaway state internationally recognised as part of Moldova, has a state emblem, adopted officially on 18 July 2000 alongside the state flag. It constitutes a remodeled version of the former Moldavian Soviet Socialist Republic's emblem, which was replaced by the internationally recognized Moldovan government after the dissolution of the Soviet Union in 1991. The only major pictorial change made in the Transnistrian version involves the addition of waves, representing the River Dniester. However, the inscriptions on the banner were changed: unlike the Moldavian SSR emblem, which bore the acronym РССМ (for "Moldavian Soviet Socialist Republic") and the USSR state slogan "Workers of the world, unite!" in the "Moldavian" (Romanian in Moldovan Cyrillic) and Russian languages, the Transnistrian emblem bears the name PRIDNESTROVIAN MOLDAVIAN REPUBLIC in the Russian, Romanian and Ukrainian languages.

- In Russian, it reads "ПРИДНЕСТРОВСКАЯ МОЛДАВСКАЯ РЕСПУБЛИКА" (transliterated as Pridnestrovskaya Moldavskaya Respublika) to the left;
- In Romanian (Moldovan Cyrillic), it reads "РЕПУБЛИКА МОЛДОВЕНЯСКЭ НИСТРЯНЭ" (transliterated as Republica Moldovenească Nistreană) in the middle;
- In Ukrainian, it reads "ПРИДНІСТРОВСЬКА МОЛДАВСЬКА РЕСПУБЛІКА" (transliterated as Prydnistrovs'ka Moldavs'ka Respublika) to the right.

Despite the emblem's depiction of the hammer and sickle, Transnistria is not a socialist state. The current president of Transnistria, Vadim Krasnoselsky, who identifies himself as a monarchist, has stated that he considers the Soviet symbolism in the emblems of his country to be "irrelevant".

Emblem of the Moldavian SSR; the Transnistrian emblem is based on it

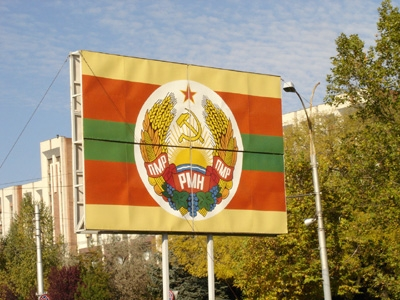
A road signboard with civil flag of Transnistria that superimposed with simplified version of the national emblem

== Other emblems ==
The law which formally established the Administrative-Territorial Units of the Left Bank of the Dniester contains provisions for the region to adopt its own symbols. The region has not currently adopted a distinctive emblem therefore the coat of arms of Moldova are used for official purposes.

Coat of arms of Moldova

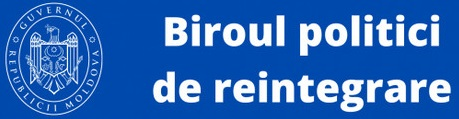
Emblem of the Bureau of Reintegration

Emblem of the Transnistria Governorate (1941–1944)

== See also ==
- Coat of arms of Tiraspol
- Coat of arms of Gagauzia
