= Coat of arms of Moldova =

National coat of arms

- Armiger: Republic of Moldova
- Adopted: 13 July 1990
- Shield: Per fess gules and azure, an aurochs head cabossed overall, accompanied by two lozenges to its sides, a mullet of eight points between the horns, a heraldic rose to dexter and a crescent decrescent to sinister, all or.
- Supporters: Behind the shield: an eagle (heraldic, wings inverted) proper (golden brown), beaked and membered gules, holding in his beak a cross or, in his dexter talon an olive branch vert and in his sinister a scepter or.

The coat of arms of Moldova is the national emblem of the Republic of Moldova. It was designed by Moldovan artist Gheorghe Vrabie.

The escutcheon's aurochs head accompanied by a rose, crescent and pointed star is derived from the coat of arms of the Principality of Moldavia. The heraldic supporter of an eagle with a cross in the beak is derived from the interwar coat of arms of the Kingdom of Romania. Most of Moldova's territory was part of Romania between World War I and World War II.

== Official description ==
Moldovan law describes the arms as follows:

Per fess gules and azure, an aurochs head cabossed overall, accompanied by a mullet of eight points between the horns, a heraldic rose to dexter and a crescent decrescent to sinister, all or; supporter, behind the shield: an eagle (heraldic, wings inverted) proper (golden brown), beaked and membered gules, holding in his beak a cross or, in his dexter talon an olive branch vert and in his sinister a scepter or.

== Historical coats of arms of Moldova ==
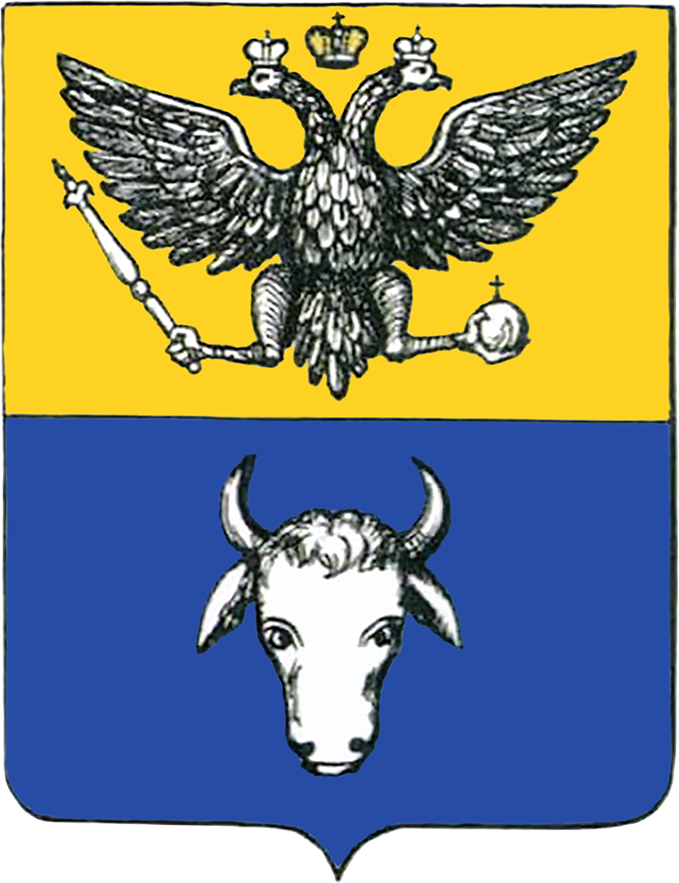
Coat of arms of the Russian Bessarabia Governorate (1815–1826)

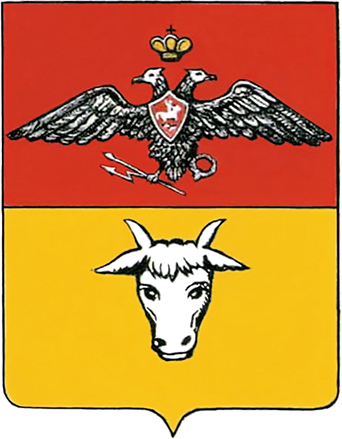
Coat of arms of the Bessarabia Governorate (1815–1878)

Coat of arms of the Bessarabia Governorate (1878)

Coat of arms of the Moldavian Democratic Republic (1917–1918)

Coat of arms of the Kingdom of Romania (1921–1947)

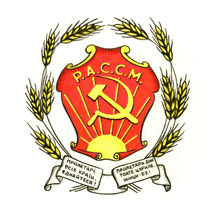
Coat of arms of the Moldavian Autonomous Soviet Socialist Republic (1927–1938)

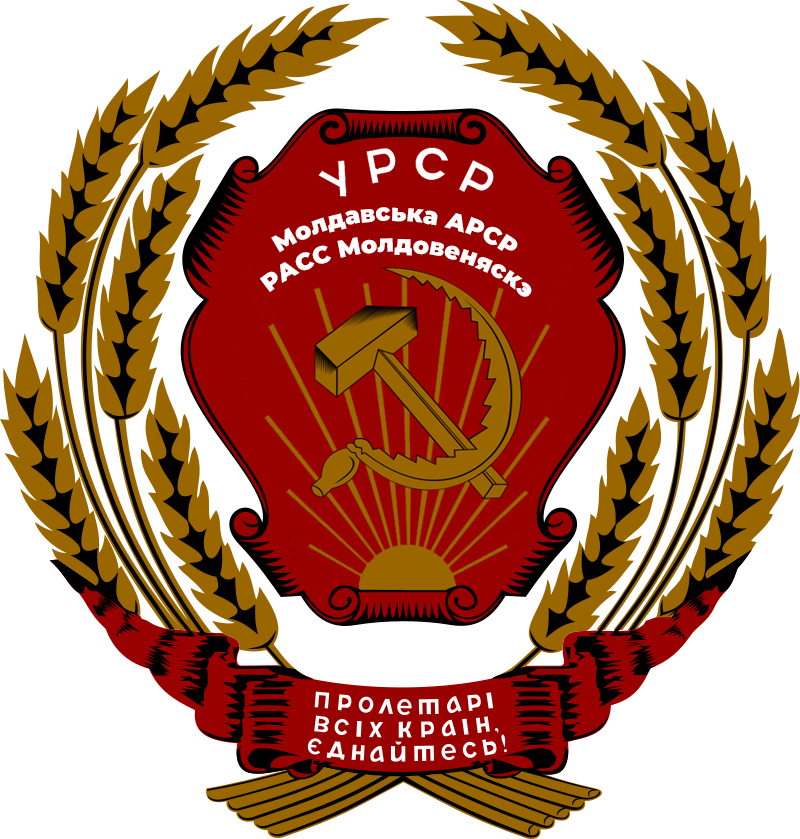
Coat of arms of the Moldavian Autonomous Soviet Socialist Republic (1938–1940)

Emblem of the Moldavian Soviet Socialist Republic (1940–1941)

Emblem of the Moldavian Soviet Socialist Republic (1941–1957)

Emblem of the Moldavian Soviet Socialist Republic (1957–1981)

Emblem of the Moldavian Soviet Socialist Republic (1981–1990)

== See also ==
- Flag of Moldova
- Coat of arms of Romania
- Flag of the Moldavian Soviet Socialist Republic
- Emblem of the Moldavian Soviet Socialist Republic
- Flag of Transnistria
- Coat of arms of Transnistria
