= Flag of Transnistria =

Pridnestrovian Moldavian Republic
- Use: State flag and ensign, war flag
- Proportion: 1:2
- Adopted: 2 September 1991 (de facto); 18 July 2000 (de jure)
- Design: Three horizontal bands of red, green and red, in a 3:2:3 ratio, charged in the canton with a gold hammer and sickle crowned by a gold-bordered, five-pointed red star
- Reverse side of the state flag
- Use: Civil flag and ensign
- Proportion: 1:2
- Design: Three horizontal bands of red, green and red, in a 3:2:3 ratio

Transnistria (officially the Pridnestrovian Moldavian Republic or PMR), a breakaway state internationally recognised as part of Moldova, has a state flag, a presidential standard, and a customs flag. Additionally, the flag of Russia shares equal legal status with the state flag.

Transnistria's state flag law outlines the design and use of the state flag. The state flag is a horizontal triband of red, green and red, in a 3:2:3 ratio, charged in the canton with a gold hammer and sickle crowned by a gold-bordered, five-pointed red star. The design is equivalent to that of the flag of the Moldavian Soviet Socialist Republic, (Note: The colours of Transnistria's state flag were standardised on 18 July 2000, when the flag was officially adopted.) which Transnistria broke away from in 1990. The reverse side of the state flag is a simplified version that omits the star, hammer and sickle. With the exception of government institutions, any organisation or individual may substitute the state flag with the simplified variant.

Although the state flag retains Soviet-era communist symbols, Transnistria is not a communist state and the state flag law does not give the flag's symbols or colours any particular meaning.

== Design and construction ==
Article 3 of Transnistria's state flag law describes the design of the state flag's obverse side. The width-to-length ratio of the flag is 1:2. Its design consists of three horizontal bands of red, green and red, in a 3:2:3 ratio, charged in the canton with a gold hammer and sickle crowned by a gold-bordered, five-pointed red star. Appendix 1 specifies that the reverse side of the flag omits the star, hammer and sickle. Despite the flag's use of communist symbols, Transnistria is not a communist state. The state flag law does not attribute significance to the flag's symbols or colours. Flags of subnational units and public institutions cannot resemble or be based on the design of the state flag.

Precise instructions on the construction of the flag are contained in article 3, and construction sheets are provided in appendix 2. The hammer and sickle are inscribed in an imaginary square with side lengths equal to one-fifth of the flag's width. The star is inscribed in an imaginary circle with a diameter equal to one-tenth of the flag's width. The star, hammer and sickle are positioned such that the bottom of the imaginary circle touches the top of the imaginary square. The distance between the vertical axis of the star, hammer and sickle and the flagpole is equal to one-quarter of the flag's width (i.e. one-eighth of the flag's length). The distance between the top edge of the flag and the center of the star is one-tenth of the flag's width. When reproducing the state flag, the shade of the colours and the design of the symbols should match those of the flag contained in appendices 1 and 2 of the state flag law, respectively.

Standard colours of the state flag of Transnistria
| | Red | Green | Gold |
|---|---|---|---|
| CMYK | 0/100/100/13 | 100/0/67/40 | 0/16/100/0 |
| RGB | 222/0/0 | 0/153/51 | 255/215/0 |
| Hexadecimal | #DE0000 | #009933 | #FFD700 |

Construction sheet of the state flag of Transnistria

== Protocol ==
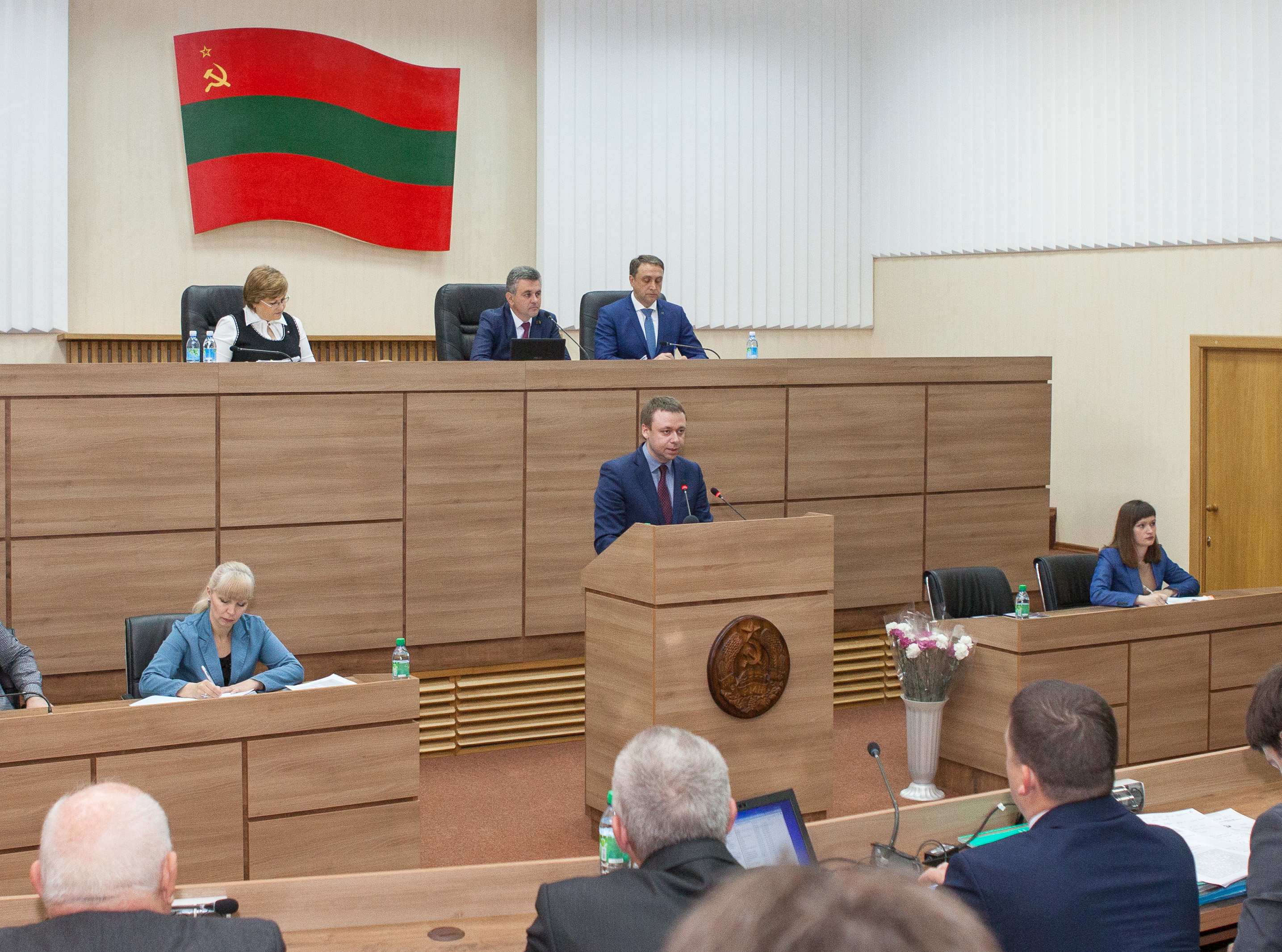
The state flag inside the Supreme Council

The state flag is used prominently by the government institutions of Transnistria. It is raised permanently on buildings belonging to government institutions, such as the office of the president, the Supreme Council building, judicial courts, and the Transnistrian Republican Bank. (Note: The full list of institutions as written in Article 5 of the Transnistrian state flag law is: Office of the President of the Pridnestrovian Moldavian Republic; Supreme Council of the Pridnestrovian Moldavian Republic; Government of the Pridnestrovian Moldavian Republic; Constitutional Court of the Pridnestrovian Moldavian Republic; Supreme Court of the Pridnestrovian Moldavian Republic; Arbitration Court of the Pridnestrovian Moldavian Republic; Prosecutor's Office of the Pridnestrovian Moldavian Republic; Central bank of the Pridnestrovian Moldavian Republic; Accounts Chamber of the Pridnestrovian Moldavian Republic; residence of the Commissioner for Human Rights in the Pridnestrovian Moldavian Republic; Central Electoral Commission of the Pridnestrovian Moldavian Republic; other government bodies, as well as local representative and executive government bodies) It is also raised during state-sanctioned events, such as official ceremonies and observances. Non-state institutions and residences are permitted to raise and fly the state flag during these events; they may also raise the flag for the duration of their own private ceremonies. The state flag is displayed inside the meeting rooms of the legislative, executive and judicial branches of government, as well as the offices of top officials, diplomatic missions abroad, and state-run educational institutions. (Note: The full list of individuals and institutions as written in Article 7 of the Transnistrian state flag law is: Chairman of the Supreme Council of the Pridnestrovian Moldavian Republic; Chairman of the Government of the Pridnestrovian Moldavian Republic; Head of the Administration of the President of the Pridnestrovian Moldavian Republic; Chairman of the Constitutional Court of the Pridnestrovian Moldavian Republic; Chairman of the Supreme Court of the Pridnestrovian Moldavian Republic; Chairman of the Arbitration Court of the Pridnestrovian Moldavian Republic; Prosecutor of the Pridnestrovian Moldavian Republic; Chairman of the Central Bank; Chairman of the Accounts Chamber of the Pridnestrovian Moldavian Republic; Commissioner for Human Rights in the Pridnestrovian Moldavian Republic; Chairman of the Central Electoral Commission of the Pridnestrovian Moldavian Republic; heads of other state authorities and management, as well as local representative and executive bodies of state power; heads of official missions of the Pridnestrovian Moldavian Republic outside the Pridnestrovian Moldavian Republic, including official missions of the Pridnestrovian Moldavian Republic to international organizations) Additionally, official government websites must show the state flag. Government-manufactured items, such as certificates, medals and military uniforms, may also feature the state flag. With the exception of government institutions, a simplified version of the state flag that omits the star, hammer and sickle may be used as a substitute.

During periods of mourning, the state flag is lowered to half-mast and a black ribbon is attached to the top of its flagpole. The length of the black ribbon should be equal to the length of the flag. The state flag may be draped over the coffin of a deceased member of the armed forces during their military funeral. Before the burial, the state flag is retrieved, folded and handed over to the relatives of the deceased.

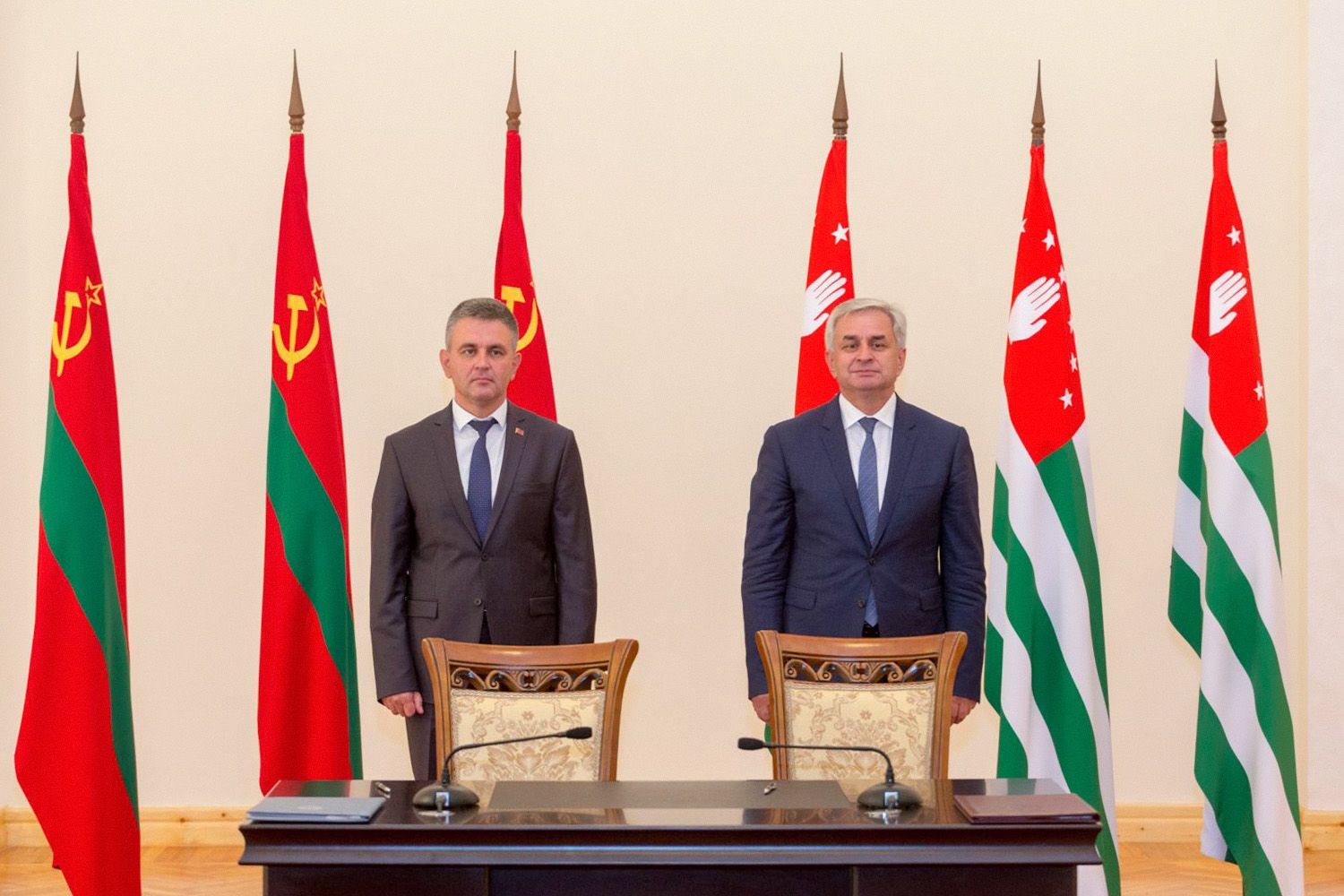
Transnistrian president Vadim Krasnoselsky and Abkhazian president Raul Khajimba in front of their respective state flags, 29 September 2017

When the state flag is flown alongside other flags, it should occupy the position of honour as outlined in appendix 3 of the state flag law. The size of the flags and flagpoles should be equal, but if the height of the flagpoles vary, the state flag should be on the tallest flagpole. When two different flags are flown, the state flag should be on the observer's left. In a row of three different flags, it is positioned in the center, with the second most important flag to its left. In a row of four different flags, it takes the first position on the left of the observer (i.e. left-of-center). When five or more different flags are flown in a row, the state flag appears at both ends. However, if the flags are arranged in a semicircle, the state flag is placed in the center or on the left of the middle pair if the number is even. In a closed circular arrangement, the state flag is positioned at the main entrance externally and opposite the entrance internally, with other flags arranged in a clockwise order of decreasing priority. In a two-row corridor formation, the state flag is the first flag on the left side of the entrance, and in a V-shaped arrangement, it occupies the tip position. The state flag should be raised first and lowered last if simultaneous movement of the flags is not possible. During marches and processions, the state flag must always be carried or displayed in a position of prominence.

Flags of foreign states and international organisations may be displayed in Transnistria only if they are accompanied by the state flag. Buildings housing foreign diplomatic missions are exempted from this rule. The state flag takes precedence in position and size, and when flown together, the other flags must be on separate flagpoles. Foreign flags are positioned to the right of the state flag and arranged alphabetically in one of Transnistria's official languages (i.e. Russian, Romanian or Ukrainian).

== History ==
In the final years of the Soviet Union, the Moldavian Soviet Socialist Republic saw a rise in nationalist sentiment among the ethnic Moldovan population. Linguistic disputes in the Moldavian SSR prompted the Russian-speaking majority inhabiting the left bank of the Dniester to proclaim the Pridnestrovian Moldavian Soviet Socialist Republic (PMSSR) on 2 September 1990. Although then Soviet leader Mikhail Gorbachev voided the proclamation, the PMSSR continued to govern itself independently. While the rest of the Moldavian SSR adopted a new state flag in May 1990 and again on 3 November, the PMSSR continued flying the flag of the Moldavian SSR adopted in 1952. On 5 November 1991, the PMSSR dropped "Soviet Socialist" from its name, becoming the Pridnestrovian Moldavian Republic (PMR).

The state flag of Transnistria was officially adopted on 18 July 2000 with the passing of the Transnistrian law on state symbols. The law also standardised the flag's exact design and colours.

In 2009, Supreme Council deputies of the ruling Obnovlenie party proposed adopting the Russian tricolour as Transnistria's national flag. Reasons for the proposal, as recorded on the website of the Supreme Council, included "numerous requests by citizens", the historical relationship between Transnistria and Russia, and a 2006 referendum in which 96% of voters voted for the accession of Transnistria to Russia. However, it was not until a Supreme Council vote on 12 April 2017 that the flag of Russia was made legally co-equal to the state flag of Transnistria.

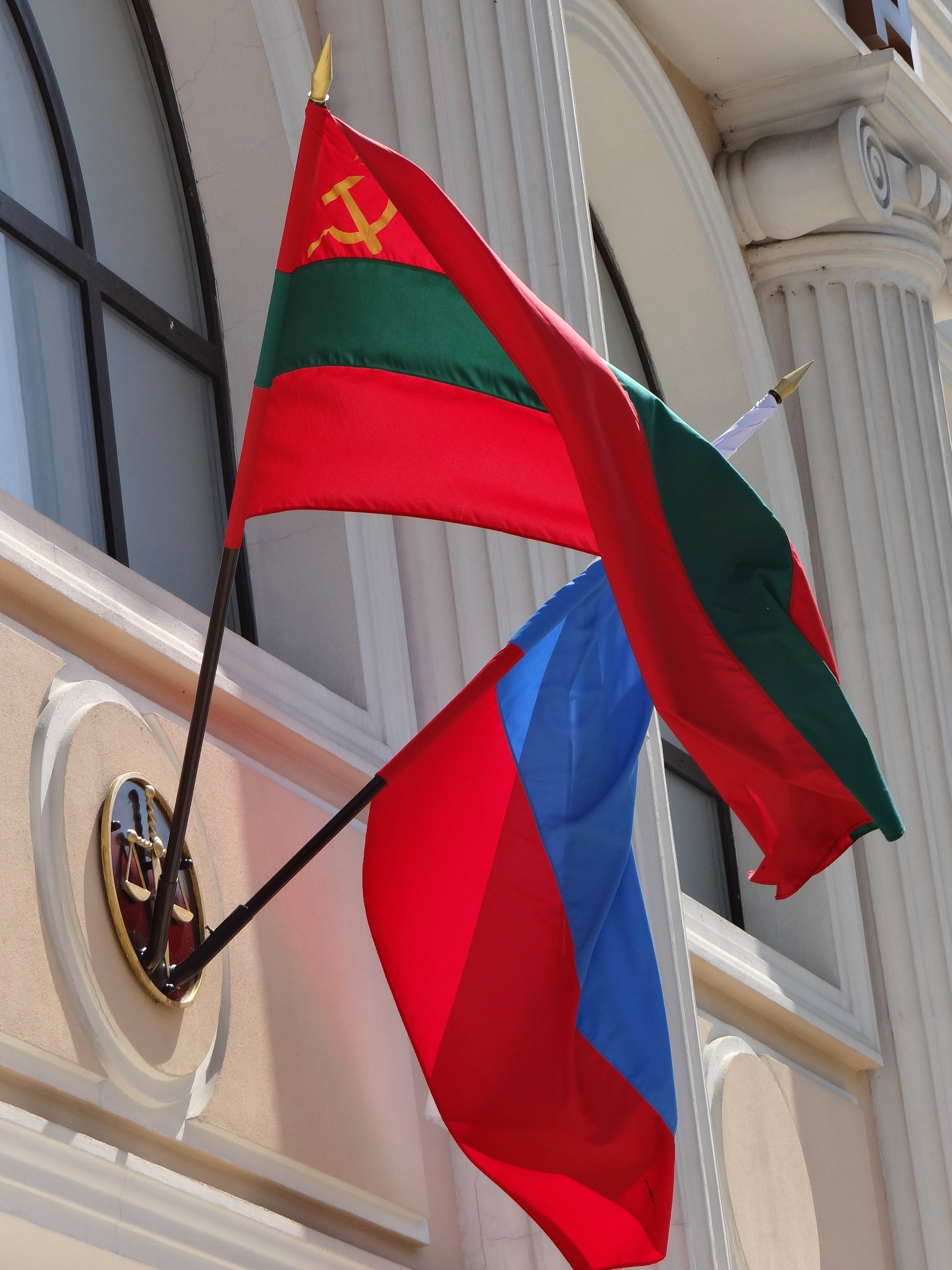
The Transnistrian state flag and Russian flag on the facade of a court building in Tiraspol, the capital of Transnistria

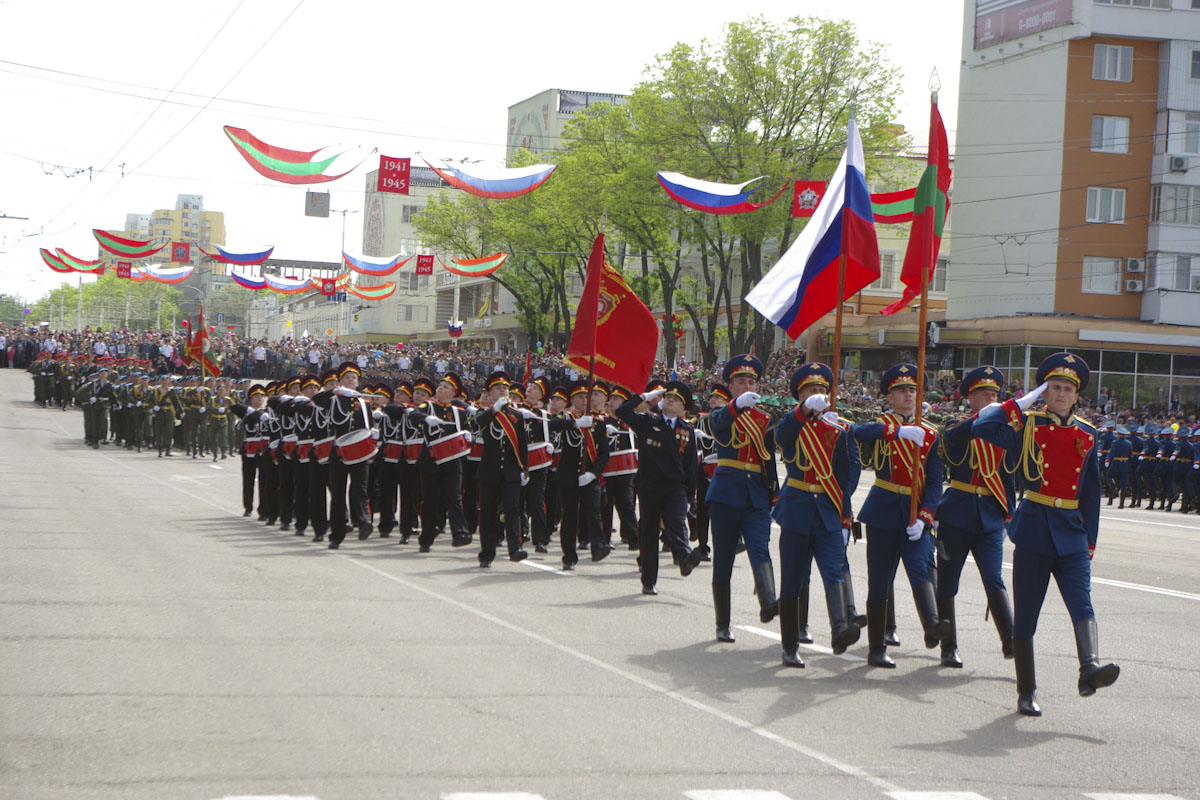
The Transnistrian state flag displayed alongside the Russian flag at the 2017 Victory Day parade in Tiraspol

== Other government flags ==
Aside from the state flag, the government of Transnistria also uses a presidential standard and a customs flag. Additionally, the Russian flag has equal legal status to the state flag.

Flags used by the Transnistrian government other than the state flag
| Flag | Type | Description |
|---|---|---|
| | Flag of Russia | A horizontal tricolour of white, blue, and red. The Russian flag has been displayed on par with the state flag since 12 April 2017. |
| | Presidential standard | Three horizontal bands of red, green, and red, in a 3:2:3 ratio, charged in the center with the state emblem of Transnistria. The presidential standard was adopted by presidential decree on 10 January 1997. |
| | Customs flag | A green field with two horizontal red bands at the bottom, charged in the center with two crossed gold caducei. The customs flag was adopted by presidential decree on 3 March 2018. |

== See also ==
- List of Moldovan flags
- Nostalgia for the Soviet Union
