= Flag of the Moldavian Soviet Socialist Republic =

Moldavian Soviet Socialist Republic
- Use: Civil and state flag, civil and state ensign
- Proportion: 1:2
- Adopted: 31 January 1952
- Relinquished: 6 November 1990
- Design: Three horizontal bands of red, green and red, in a 3:2:3 ratio, charged in the canton with a gold hammer and sickle crowned by a gold-bordered, five-pointed red star.
- Reverse flag
- Use: Civil and state flag, civil and state ensign
- Flag of the Moldavian SSR (1990–1991) and the Republic of Moldova (1991–)
- Use: National flag and ensign
- Proportion: 1:2
- Adopted: 6 November 1990
- Relinquished: 26 November 2010
- Design: A vertical tricolour of blue, yellow and red; charged with the coat of arms centered on the yellow band.

The flag of the Moldavian Soviet Socialist Republic for most of its history was a horizontal triband of red, green and red, in a 3:2:3 ratio, charged in the canton with a gold hammer and sickle crowned by a gold-bordered, five-pointed red star. This was the SSR's second flag, adopted on 31 January 1952.

The SSR's first flag was in use from 1940 to 1952. In 1990, the Romanian tricolor was briefly the SSR's flag before what would become the coat of arms of Moldova was added to the center. The resulting flag was retained when Moldova declared its independence the following year, in 1991.

The unrecognized state of Transnistria, which broke away from the rest of Moldova in 1990, retained the (second) flag of the Moldavian SSR and still in use to this day.

== History ==
=== Moldavian ASSR ===
Between 1924 and 1940, part of Moldova was organized as the Moldavian ASSR within the Ukrainian SSR. A red flag, with the gold hammer and sickle in the top-left corner, above the Cyrillic characters УРСР (Ukrainian initials of Ukrainian SSR) and the Latin characters RSSU (Moldovan initials of Ukrainian SSR in Latin script) was adopted in 1938. The Moldovan text on the flag was later changed to PCCУ (Moldovan initials of Ukrainian SSR in Cyrillic script).

Flag of the Moldavian ASSR (1938–1938)

Flag of the Moldavian ASSR (1938–1940)

=== Moldavian SSR ===
In 1940, a red flag with the gold hammer and sickle in the top-left corner, with the Cyrillic characters РССМ (Moldovan initials of Moldavian SSR in Cyrillic script) above them in gold in a serif font was adopted for the newly founded Moldavian Soviet Socialist Republic.

On 31 January 1952, the Decree of the Presidium of the Supreme Soviet of the Moldavian SSR "On the approval of the draft of the new State Flag of the Moldavian SSR" approved the following description of a new flag:

The State Flag of the Moldavian Soviet Socialist Republic consists of a red cloth with a green stripe in the middle along the entire length of the flag, with an image on the upper red part of the cloth near the flagpole of a golden sickle and hammer and above them a red five-pointed star framed by a golden border. The ratio of the width of the flag to its length is 1:2. The ratio of the width of the green stripe to the width of the flag is 1:4.

Flag of the Moldavian SSR (1940–1952)

Flag of the Moldavian SSR (1952–1990)

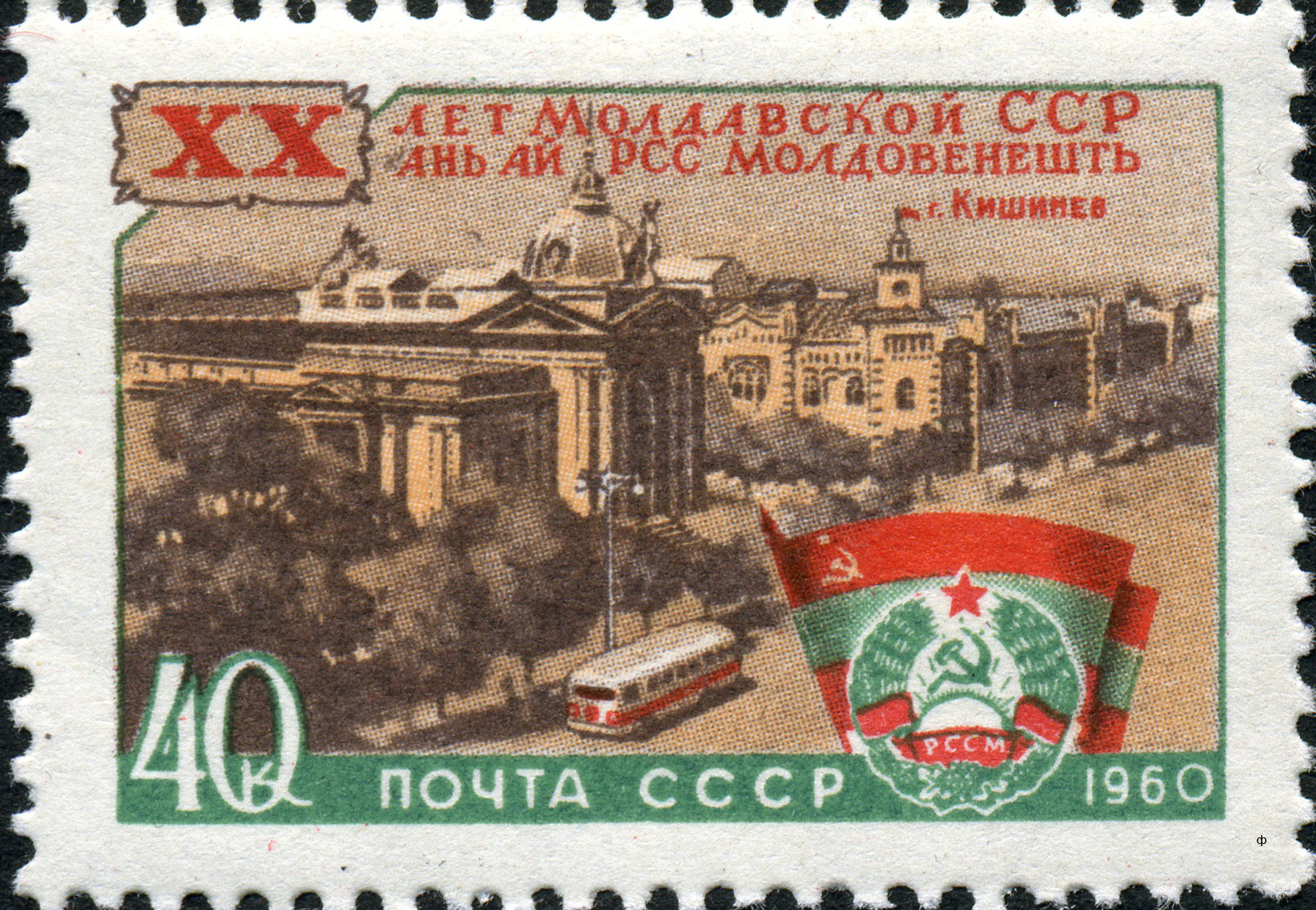
Flag of the Moldavian SSR on a 1960 stamp

With perestroika in force, the Moldovan nationalism came in place with the Popular Front of Moldova being involved. On 27 April 1990, the new flag of the Moldavian SSR consisted of the Romanian tricolor with the emblem of the Moldavian SSR in the center. However, it was decided to use the flag without the emblem until new symbols were worked on. When the Moldavian SSR declared sovereignty in June 1990, this new flag was adopted on 6 November 1990 and was used as the flag of Moldova until 2010, when it was slightly modified.

Unofficial flag of the Moldavian SSR (1990, early prototype)

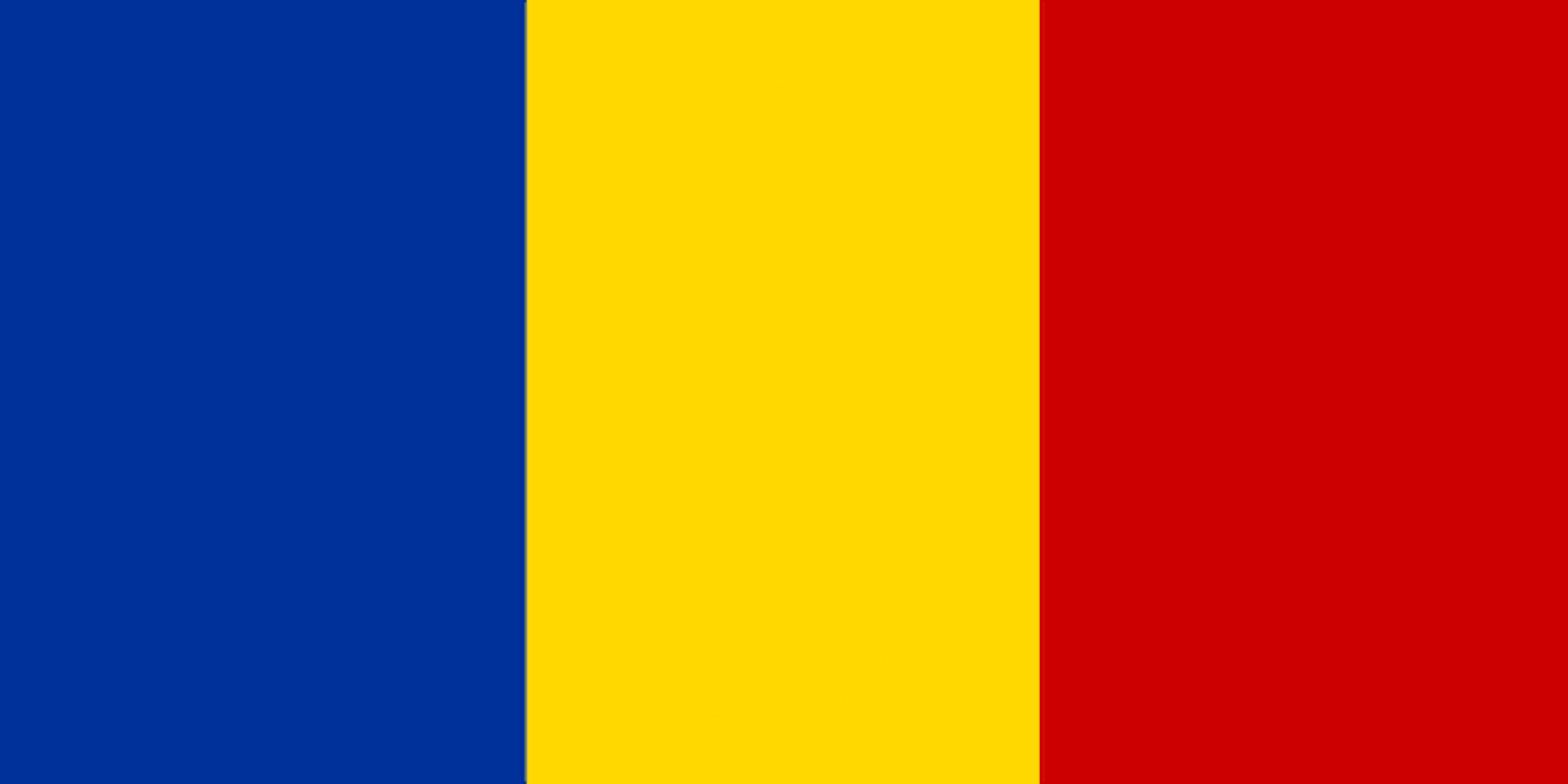
Flag of the Moldavian SSR (1990)

Flag of the Moldavian Soviet Socialist Republic (1990–1991)

=== Use in Transnistria ===
The breakaway Pridnestrovian Moldavian Soviet Socialist Republic (PMSSR) retained the 1952 flag when it declared its separation from the Moldavian SSR on 2 September 1990. On 5 November 1991, the PMSSR dropped "Soviet Socialist" from its name, becoming the Pridnestrovian Moldavian Republic (PMR), commonly known in English as Transnistria. The former flag of the Moldavian SSR was officially adopted by the internationally unrecognized state as its state flag on 18 July 2000.

== See also ==
- Coat of arms of the Moldavian SSR
- Flag of the Socialist Republic of Romania
