= Gheorghe Vrabie =

Moldovan artist (1939–2016)

Gheorge Vrabie (21 March 1939 – 31 March 2016) was a Moldovan artist, the author of the Coat of arms of the Republic of Moldova and of the Flag of the Chișinău Municipality, of the national currency for which he was named the "Father of the Moldovan leu". From 1962 to 1967 he studied at the "Ilya Repin" State Academic Institute of Fine Arts, Sculpture and Architecture (now Imperial Academy of Arts) from Saint Petersburg . In 1961 was his debut. It has illustrated over the years several volumes of Roman and universal literature. The artist's interest turned to such authors as Mihai Eminescu, Ion Druță, Grigore Vieru, Dante, Longus, Paul Valéry. The books’ graphics by Gheorghe Vrabie are distinguished by line intensity, accuracy and fine execution.

Gheorghe Vrabie made the series of works called "Hipism". Together with his wife, Dorina Cojocaru makes several mosaic works.

He opened personal exhibitions in Moldova and abroad. These include the one placed at the Moldovan Writers' Union, the National Museum of History and Archeology, the National House, the Embassy of Romania in the Republic of Moldova, the National Library, the Fine Arts Union's Constantin Brâncuşi Exhibition Center. He exhibited at the Art Gallery at "The House of Book" in Iași, at the Central House of Writers in Moscow, in the Central Hall of the Fine Artists Union in Odessa.

Gheorghe Vrabie participated at the exhibitions in Bucharest, Moscow, Saint Petersburg, Bratislava, Vienna, Washington, Alma-Ata, Plovdiv, as well as in Romania (Bacău, Botoșani, Moinești). He has been invited to various creative camps, workshops, symposiums in Romania, Russia, Latvia, Lithuania, Hungary.

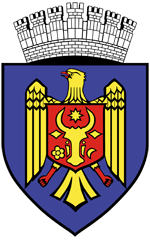
Vrabie designed the coat of arms of Chișinău, the capital of Moldova.

== Prizes and awards ==
- In 1964, Vrabie won the First Award for Graphics at the competition organized by the Academy of Fine Art in St. Petersburg;
- In 1990 - an Award at the competition organized for the developing of the Moldovian State coat of arms;
- In 1999 - the award of the Fine Artists Union of Moldova;
- In 1998, he received the Master Art Award, and in 2000, The Eminescu medal.
- In 2010, Gheorghe Vrabie was decorated with the highest state award of the Republic of Moldova, "The Order of the Republic".
