= Orthodox Temples (Transnistria) =

Series of commemorative coins

Orthodox Temples is the name of a series of commemorative coins issued in Transnistria in 2001 by the Transnistrian Republican Bank.

According to official information from the Bank, the coins were issued in remembrance of the many churches which were "destroyed in times of persecutions" of the Church [during the Soviet time] and, as such, the series was devoted to restored and reconstructed sacred edifices.

The series consists of gold and silver coins featuring images of the following Russian Orthodox churches within the Diocese of Tiraspol (Transnistria):

- Church of the Blessed Virgin's Assumption (Vărăncău village)
- Church of the Blessed Virgin's Protection (Valea Adâncă village)
- Cathedral of God's Ascension (Chiţcani village)
- Cathedral of the Birth of Christ (Tiraspol city)
- Cathedral of Transfiguration (Bender city)
- Church of the Blessed Virgin's Birth (Vadul-Turcului village)
- Church of Paraskeva the Serbian (Zăzuleni village)
- Church of the Lifegiving Trinity (Raşcov village)
- Church of St Michael the Archangel (Stroieşti village)

== See also ==
- Transnistrian rubla (legal tender)
