= Christmas Church =

Christmas Church may refer to:

- Christmas Church (Tiraspol), a church in Tiraspol, Transnistria, Moldova
- Christmas Church, a church in Poshtova Square, Kiev, Ukraine
