= Diocese of Tiraspol =

Diocese of Tiraspol may refer to:

- Diocese of Tiraspol and Dubăsari, a diocese of the Moldovan Orthodox Church
- Diocese of Tiraspol (Russia), a former Latin Church diocese of the Catholic Church
