= Transnistrian ruble =

Currency of Transnistria

рублэ транснистрянэ/rublă transnistreană (Romanian); приднестровский рубль (Russian); придністровський рубль (Ukrainian)
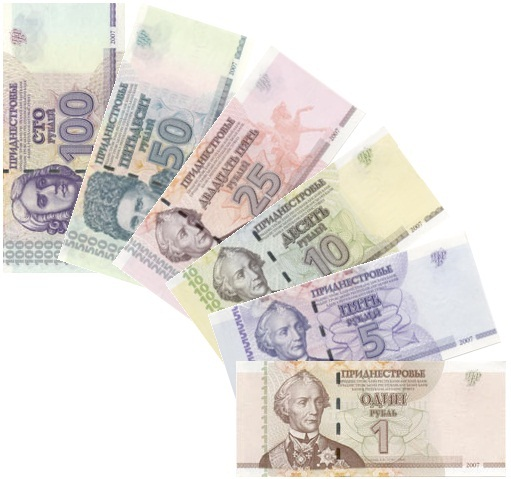
- 2007 issue Transnistrian ruble banknotes

ISO 4217
- Code: none

Units of account
- Plural: рубле/ruble (Romanian); The language(s) of this currency belong(s) to the Slavic languages. There is more than one way to construct plural forms.
- Symbol: (commonly руб. and р., with occasionally ПМР after it)
- Subunit
- 1/100: kopeck копейка (Russian) копейкэ/ copeică (Romanian)
- Plural
- kopeck копейка (Russian) копейкэ/ copeică (Romanian): kopecks копейки (Russian) копейчь/ copeici (Romanian)

Denominations
- Banknotes
- Freq. used: 1, 5, 10, 25, 50, 100 rubles
- Rarely used: 200, 500 rubles
- Coins
- Freq. used: 5, 10, 25, 50 kopecks, 1, 3, 5, 10 rubles

Demographics
- Date of introduction: 1994
- Replaced: Soviet ruble
- User(s): Transnistria

Issuance
- Central bank: Transnistrian Republican Bank
- Website: www.cbpmr.net
- Mint: Tiraspol Mint (Тираспольский монетный двор)

Valuation
- Inflation: 16.6%
- Source: Transnistrian Republican Bank, March 2026
- Pegged with: 1 USD = 16,1 rubles

The Transnistrian ruble (alternatively rubla or rouble; Romanian: rublă transnistreană, Moldovan Cyrillic: рублэ транснистрянэ; Russian: приднестровский рубль; Ukrainian: придністровський рубль) is the currency of the internationally unrecognized state of Transnistria. It is divided into 100 kopecks.

Since Transnistria is a polity with no credible international recognition and its territory is formally part of Moldova, its currency has no ISO 4217 code, and thus Transnistria cannot participate in any global card payment processing network. Cards are accepted, but only on the Russian developed MIR network. However, unofficially some Transnistrian organisations, such as Agroprombank and Gazprombank, used the code PRB, a code reserved for Puerto Rico (ISO 3166-1 country code "PR"). The Transnistrian Republican Bank sometimes uses the code RUP, a code reserved for Russia (ISO 3166-1 country code "RU").

== First ruble (1994) ==
Soviet banknotes were used in the Pridnestrovian Moldavian Republic after its formation in 1990. When the former Soviet republics began issuing their own currencies, Transnistria was flooded with Soviet rubles. In an attempt to protect its financial system, in July 1993, the Transnistrian government bought used Goznak-printed Soviet and Russian notes dated 1961–1992 and modified these notes by applying adhesive stamps bearing the image of General Alexander Vasilyevich Suvorov, founder of Tiraspol, and the notes' corresponding denomination. These stamped notes replaced unstamped Soviet and Russian notes at par. It is thought that most uncirculated notes bearing these stickers were created after 1994 specifically for collectors.

== Second ruble (1994–2000) ==
The first, provisional issues were replaced in August 1994 by a new ruble, equal to 1,000 old rubles. This currency consisted solely of banknotes and suffered from high inflation, necessitating the issue of notes overstamped with higher denominations. Although issued in 1994, some notes (50 to 5,000 rubles) were issued dated 1993.

=== Banknotes ===
1994 Series
Value	Dimensions	Main Colour	Images		Description		Date of	
Value	Dimensions	Main Colour	Obverse	Reverse	Obverse	Reverse	printing	issue
1 ruble	125 mm x 57 mm	Green			Alexander Suvorov	Transnistrian Supreme Soviet	1994	
5 rubles	125 mm x 57 mm	Blue			Alexander Suvorov	Transnistrian Supreme Soviet	1994	
10 rubles	125 mm x 57 mm	Red			Alexander Suvorov	Transnistrian Supreme Soviet	1994	
50 rubles	125 mm x 57 mm	Dull green			Equestrian Statue of Alexander Suvorov in Tiraspol	Transnistrian Supreme Soviet	1993	1993
100 rubles	125 mm x 57 mm	Brown			Equestrian Statue of Alexander Suvorov in Tiraspol	Transnistrian Supreme Soviet	1993	1993
200 rubles		Red violet			Equestrian Statue of Alexander Suvorov in Tiraspol	Transnistrian Supreme Soviet	1993	1994
500 rubles		Blue			Equestrian Statue of Alexander Suvorov in Tiraspol	Transnistrian Supreme Soviet	1993	1994
1,000 rubles		Purple and red-violet			Equestrian Statue of Alexander Suvorov in Tiraspol	Transnistrian Supreme Soviet	1993	1994
1,000 rubles		Purple			Alexander Suvorov	Transnistrian Supreme Soviet	1994	1994
5,000 rubles		Black on deep olive-green			Equestrian Statue of Alexander Suvorov in Tiraspol	Transnistrian Supreme Soviet	1993	1995
10,000 rubles		Green			Alexander Suvorov overprinted on a 1 ruble note with "10000" only on front	Transnistrian Supreme Soviet	1994	1996
10,000 rubles		Green			Alexander Suvorov overprinted on a 1 ruble note with "10000" on front and back	Transnistrian Supreme Soviet	1994	1998
50,000 rubles		Brown			Bohdan Khmelnytsky	Drama and Comedy theatre, Tiraspol	1995	
50,000 rubles		Blue			Alexander Suvorov overprinted on a 5 ruble note, with a holographic seal containing his equestrian statue in Tiraspol and the value "50000" on front	Transnistrian Supreme Soviet	1994	1996
50,000 rubles		Blue			Alexander Suvorov overprinted on a 5 ruble note with "50000" on front and back	Transnistrian Supreme Soviet	1994	1996
100,000 rubles		Red			Alexander Suvorov overprinted on a 10 ruble note with "100000" on front and back	Transnistrian Supreme Soviet	1994	1996
500,000 rubles		Purple on yellow			Equestrian Statue of Alexander Suvorov in Tiraspol	Transnistrian Supreme Soviet	1997	1997

== Third ruble (2000–present) ==
In 2000, a new ruble was introduced at a rate of 1 new ruble = 1,000,000 second rubles. This new currency consists of both coins and banknotes.

=== Coins ===
Coin of the Transnistrian ruble
Image	Value	Technical parameters				Description			Date of first minting	Notes
Image	Value	Diameter	Thickness	Mass	Composition	Edge	Obverse	Reverse	Date of first minting	Notes
	1 kopeck	15.9 mm	1.5 mm	0.62 grams	Aluminum	Plain/Smooth	National emblem of the Pridnestrovian Moldavian Republic (Transnistria), year of issue	Numerical "1", inscription "КОПЕЙКА" between two ears of wheat	2000	Minted by the Mint of Poland (Mennica Polska); withdrawn from circulation in January 2009
	5 kopecks	17.9 mm	1.4 mm	0.7 grams	Aluminum	Plain/Smooth	National emblem of the Pridnestrovian Moldavian Republic (Transnistria), year of issue	Numerical "5", inscription "КОПЕЕК" between two ears of wheat	2000	Minted by the Mint of Poland (Mennica Polska)
	5 kopecks	18 mm	1.43 mm	0.79 grams	Aluminum	Plain/Smooth	National emblem of the Pridnestrovian Moldavian Republic (Transnistria), year of issue	Numerical "5", inscription "КОПЕЕК" between two ears of wheat	2005	Modified coat of arms; minted by the Tiraspol Mint (Тираспольский монетный двор)
	5 kopecks				Nickel-plated steel	Plain/Smooth	National emblem of the Pridnestrovian Moldavian Republic (Transnistria), year of issue	Numerical "5", inscription "КОПЕЕК" between two ears of wheat	2019	Change of metallic composition; minted by the Tiraspol Mint (Тираспольский монетный двор)
	10 kopecks	20 mm	1.5 mm	1 gram	Aluminum	Plain/Smooth	National emblem of the Pridnestrovian Moldavian Republic (Transnistria), year of issue	Numerical "10", inscription "КОПЕЕК" between two ears of wheat	2000	Minted by the Mint of Poland (Mennica Polska)
	10 kopecks	20 mm	1.5 mm	1 gram	Aluminum	Plain/Smooth	National emblem of the Pridnestrovian Moldavian Republic (Transnistria), year of issue	Numerical "10", inscription "КОПЕЕК" between two ears of wheat	2005	Modified coat of arms; minted by the Tiraspol Mint (Тираспольский монетный двор)
	10 kopecks				Nickel-plated steel	Plain/Smooth	National emblem of the Pridnestrovian Moldavian Republic (Transnistria), year of issue	Numerical "10", inscription "КОПЕЕК" between two ears of wheat	2019	Change of metallic composition; minted by the Tiraspol Mint (Тираспольский монетный двор)
	25 kopecks	17 mm		2.15 grams	Aluminum-Bronze	Plain/Smooth	National emblem of the Pridnestrovian Moldavian Republic (Transnistria), year of issue	Numerical "25", inscription "КОПЕЕК" inside a stylized laurel wreath	2002	Minted by the Mint of Poland (Mennica Polska)
	25 kopecks	17 mm	1.36 mm	2.2 grams	Aluminum-Bronze	Plain/Smooth	National emblem of the Pridnestrovian Moldavian Republic (Transnistria), year of issue	Numerical "25", inscription "КОПЕЕК" inside a stylized laurel wreath	2005	Modified coat of arms; non-magnetic
	25 kopecks	17 mm	1.46 mm	2.1 grams	Bronze-plated steel	Plain/Smooth	National emblem of the Pridnestrovian Moldavian Republic (Transnistria), year of issue	Numerical "25", inscription "КОПЕЕК" inside a stylized laurel wreath	2005	Modified coat of arms; magnetic; minted by the Tiraspol Mint (Тираспольский монетный двор)
	25 kopecks				Brass-plated steel	Plain/Smooth	National emblem of the Pridnestrovian Moldavian Republic (Transnistria), year of issue	Numerical "25", inscription "КОПЕЕК" inside a stylized laurel wreath	2019	Change of metallic composition; minted by the Tiraspol Mint (Тираспольский монетный двор)
	50 kopecks	19 mm	1.45 mm	2.75 grams	Aluminum-Bronze	Plain/Smooth	National emblem of the Pridnestrovian Moldavian Republic (Transnistria), year of issue	Numerical "50", inscription "КОПЕЕК" inside a stylized laurel wreath	2000	Minted by the Mint of Poland (Mennica Polska)
	50 kopecks	18.9 mm		2.70 grams	Aluminum-Bronze	Plain/Smooth	National emblem of the Pridnestrovian Moldavian Republic (Transnistria), year of issue	Numerical "50", inscription "КОПЕЕК" inside a stylized laurel wreath	2005	Modified coat of arms; non-magnetic
	50 kopecks	19 mm	1.45 mm	2.80 grams	Bronze-plated steel	Plain/Smooth	National emblem of the Pridnestrovian Moldavian Republic (Transnistria), year of issue	Numerical "50", inscription "КОПЕЕК" inside a stylized laurel wreath	2005	Modified coat of arms; magnetic; minted at the Tiraspol Mint (Тираспольский монетный двор)
	50 kopecks	19 mm	1.45 mm	2.80 grams	Bronze-plated steel	Plain/Smooth	National emblem of the Pridnestrovian Moldavian Republic (Transnistria), year of issue	Numerical "50", inscription "КОПЕЕК" inside a stylized laurel wreath	2005	Modified coat of arms; magnetic; minted at the Tiraspol Mint (Тираспольский монетный двор)
	50 kopecks				Brass-plated steel	Plain/Smooth	National emblem of the Pridnestrovian Moldavian Republic (Transnistria), year of issue	Numerical "50", inscription "КОПЕЕК" inside a stylized laurel wreath	2019	Change of metallic composition; minted at the Tiraspol Mint (Тираспольский монетный двор)
	1 ruble	26 mm	1.2 mm	0.85 grams	Plastic - Composite material	Plain/Smooth	Numerical "1", inscription "РУБЛЬ, ПРИДНЕСТРОВСКИЙ РЕСПУБЛИКАНСКИЙ БАНК", portrait of Alexander Suvorov	Logo of the Transnistrian Republican Bank, year of issue and denomination in a repeated pattern	2014	Circular; Produced by Goznak of Russia
	3 rubles	31 mm	1.2 mm	1 gram	Plastic - Composite material	Plain/Smooth	Numerical "3", inscription "РУБЛЯ, ПРИДНЕСТРОВСКИЙ РЕСПУБЛИКАНСКИЙ БАНК", portrait of François Sainte de Wollant	Logo of the Transnistrian Republican Bank, year of issue and denomination in a repeated pattern	2014	Square-shaped (with rounded corners); Produced by Goznak of Russia
	5 rubles	28.6 mm	1.20 mm	1 gram	Plastic - Composite material	Plain/Smooth	Numerical "5", inscription "РУБЛЕЙ, ПРИДНЕСТРОВСКИЙ РЕСПУБЛИКАНСКИЙ БАНК", portrait of Pyotr Alexandrovich Rumyantsev-Zadunaisky	Logo of the Transnistrian Republican Bank, year of issue and denomination in a repeated pattern	2014	Pentagonal-shaped (with rounded corners); Produced by Goznak of Russia
	10 rubles	28 mm	1.2 mm	0.9 grams	Plastic - Composite material	Plain/Smooth	Numerical "10", inscription "РУБЛЕЙ, ПРИДНЕСТРОВСКИЙ РЕСПУБЛИКАНСКИЙ БАНК", portrait of Catherine II, the Great	Logo of the Transnistrian Republican Bank, year of issue and denomination in a repeated pattern	2014	Hexagonal-shaped (with rounded corners); Produced by Goznak of Russia

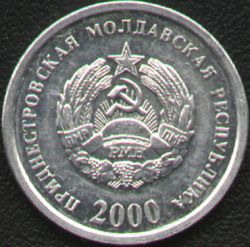
1 kopeck reverse

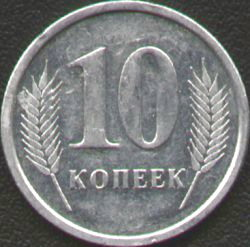
10 kopecks obverse

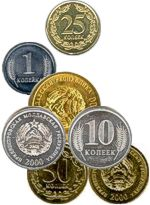
all 2000 coins
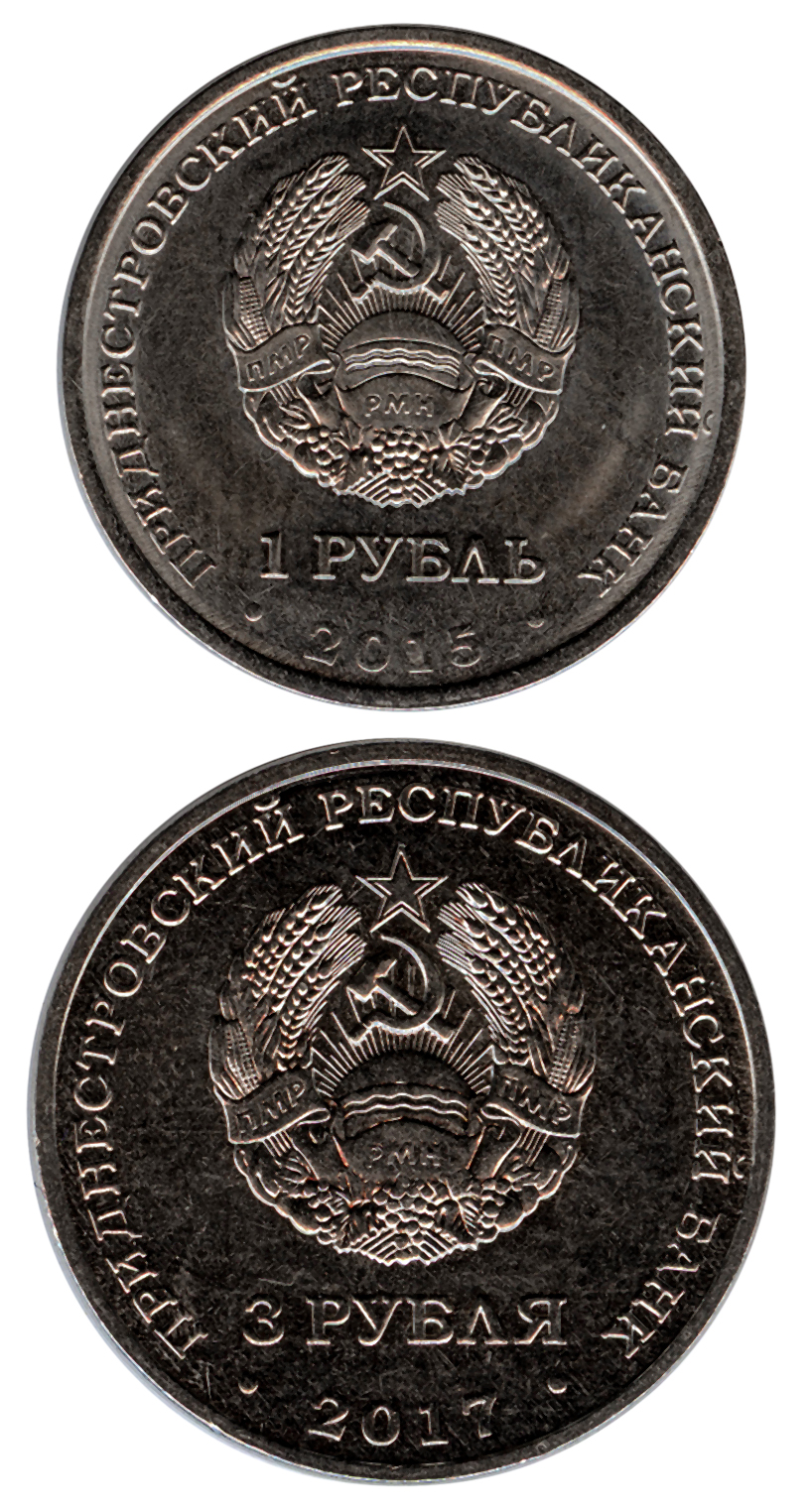
1 and 3 rubles (2015/2017), used for non-circulating commemorative coins

Coins are of 1 to 50 kopecks and are made from aluminium or copper-zinc and are similar to Soviet-era coinage. The 1 kopeck coins were withdrawn from circulation and demonetized in January 2009.

On 22 August 2014, the Transnistrian Republican Bank issued coins made of composite materials and come in denominations of 1, 3, 5 and 10 rubles.

==== Commemorative coins ====
Since 2000, the Transnistrian Republican Bank has issued many commercial commemorative coins made from silver and gold. Their mintage numbers were very low, ranging between 500 and 5,000. Topics included for example "Ancient fortresses on the river Dniester", "The outstanding people of Transdniestria" and "Red book of Transdniestria". A complete listing can be found on the website of the Transnistrian Republican Bank.

==== Mint ====
When it was founded, Transnistria did not have its own mint, thus a foreign mint had to be found to strike Transnistrian coins. The Mint of Poland (Mennica Polska) in Warsaw was selected. Coins dated 2000 were struck in Warsaw and transported via Ukraine to Transnistria in trucks belonging to the Transnistrian Republican Bank.

The Moldovan government was displeased with this situation, since they viewed it as a de facto recognition of Transnistria. In October 2001, Moldovan president Vladimir Voronin addressed the issue with his Polish counterpart.

The Polska Mennica (Mint of Poland) responded to the criticism by stating that because the Transnistrian ruble is not internationally recognized as a currency, they were producing tokens and not coins, which is normal business for mints.

The conflict came to a head when, in December 2004, Ukrainian customs confiscated a truck with US$117,000 worth of Transnistrian coins near Lviv. The coins were handed over to Moldovan authorities, who in response again protested with the Polish government.

The Polish Ministry of Foreign Affairs wrote another letter to Polska Mennica (Mint of Poland) in April 2005. They warned that continued production of Transnistrian coins would endanger relations with Ukraine and Moldova and damage the image of Poland abroad. The Polska Mennica (Mint of Poland) bowed to the pressure and cancelled its contract with Transnistria that same month.

For Transnistria there was then no other solution but to make future coins locally. Thus, on 18 November 2005, the Tiraspol Mint (Тираспольский монетный двор) was opened in the presence of President Igor Smirnov.

=== Banknotes ===
Notes are issued by the Transnistrian Republican Bank (Приднестровский Республиканский Банк) in 2000 as part of a currency reform, with 1 ruble equal to 1 million (1,000,000) old rubles. The notes come in denominations of 1, 5, 10, 25, 50, 100, 200 and 500 rubles.

==== 2000 Series ====
2000 Series
Value	Dimensions	Main Colour	Images		Description		Date of	
Value	Dimensions	Main Colour	Obverse	Reverse	Obverse	Reverse	printing	issue
1 ruble	129 × 56 mm	Orange			Alexander Suvorov	Chițcani monument	2000	
5 rubles	129 × 56 mm	Blue			Alexander Suvorov	KVINT brandy factory	2000	
10 rubles	129 × 56 mm	Brown			Alexander Suvorov	Novo-Nyametsky Monastery	2000	
25 rubles	129 × 56 mm	Red			Alexander Suvorov	Bender Castle	2000	
50 rubles	129 × 60 mm	Green			Taras Shevchenko	Presidential palace / government building in Tiraspol	2000	
100 rubles	129 × 60 mm	Purple			Dimitrie Cantemir	The Cathedral of Christmas, Tiraspol	2000	
200 rubles	135 × 64 mm	Dark brown			Peter Rumyantsev-Zadunaisky	Battle of Gross-Jägersdorf, July 21, 1757	2004	2004; 2012
500 rubles	140 × 68 mm	Dull green			Catherine II	The decree of the creation of Tiraspol by Catherine II, and the plan of a fortress	2004	2004; 2012

==== 2007 Series ====
In 2007, a new series replaced the above banknotes of denominations 1 to 100 rubles. The new notes have the same themes but a new design and improved security features.

2007 Series
Value	Dimensions	Main Colour	Images		Description		Date of	
Value	Dimensions	Main Colour	Obverse	Reverse	Obverse	Reverse	printing	issue
1 ruble	129 × 55 mm	Brown			Alexander Suvorov	Chițcani monument	2007	2007; 2012
5 rubles	129 × 55 mm	Blue			Alexander Suvorov	KVINT brandy factory	2007	2007; 2012
10 rubles	129 × 55 mm	Green/Black			Alexander Suvorov	Novo-Nyametsky Monastery	2007	2007; 2012
25 rubles	129 × 55 mm	Red			Alexander Suvorov	Bender Castle	2007	2007; 2012
50 rubles	129 x 56 mm	Cyan			Taras Shevchenko	Presidential palace / government building in Tiraspol	2007	2007; 2012
100 rubles	129 x 56 mm	Purple			Dimitrie Cantemir	Church of the Nativity, Tiraspol	2007	2007; 2012
200 rubles	135 x 64 mm	Red			Peter Rumyantsev-Zadunaisky	Battle of Kagul, July 21, 1770	2025	

==== Commemorative banknotes ====
Along with the issuance of banknotes for general circulation, the Transnistrian Republican Bank also issues commemorative banknotes focusing on the country's history and events relating to its development as an independent nation. The commemorative banknotes consist of an overprint applied on the note and are issued both for general circulation and also sold in limited numbers for the numismatic market.

=== Exchange rates ===
The currency is de facto pegged to the United States dollar. The central bank determines each workday whether it is appropriate to devalue the currency against the US dollar.

As of 6 November 2025 (Transnistrian ruble per foreign currency unit)

- US dollar: 16.1000 rubles
- Euro: 18.4957 rubles
- Russian ruble: 0.1944 rubles
- Chinese yuan: 2.2382 rubles
- Ukrainian hryvnia: 0.3827 rubles
- Moldovan leu: 0.9400 rubles
- Romanian leu: 3.6635 rubles

On 11 February 2009, the exchange rate was set to 9 Transnistrian rubles per dollar. It was changed to 9.40 rubles on 5 March 2010, 9.80 on 24 September 2010, and 10.20 on 14 December 2010. By 2013, the value of the ruble had dropped to 11.10 rubles per dollar. This was further changed to 11.30 per dollar on 16 March 2016. On 17 June 2017, the currency was devalued to 15 rubles per dollar. It was set to 16 per dollar on 12 January 2018. The most recent change was made on 5 April 2018, when it was set to 16.10 rubles per dollar.

=== Acceptance outside Transnistria ===
The Transnistrian ruble is generally not accepted as currency outside of Transnistria, although some bus companies with connections to Tiraspol accept the Transnistrian ruble at the Chișinău bus station as well as local shops in Varnița. Octavian Armașu, governor of the National Bank of Moldova from 2018 to 2023, described in May 2019 the acceptance of the Moldovan leu in Transnistria as a prerequisite for the region's integration into the Moldovan banking system.

== See also ==
- Russian ruble
- Belarusian ruble
