= Vadul Turcului =

Vadul Turcului Вадул-Туркулуй (Russian) Вадул-Туркулуй (Ukrainian)
- Commune
- Location within Moldova
- Coordinates: 47°56′16″N 28°59′19″E
- Country (de jure): Moldova
- Country (de facto): Transnistria (Note: Transnistria's political status is disputed. It considers itself to be an independent state, but this is not recognised by any UN member state. The Moldovan government and the international community consider Transnistria a part of Moldova's territory.)
- District: Rîbnița District
- Elevation: 137 m (449 ft)
- Time zone: UTC+2 (EET)
  - Summer (DST): UTC+3 (EEST)

Vadul Turcului (Romanian; Ukrainian: Вадул-Туркулуй; Russian: Вадул-Туркулуй, Vadul-Turkului, Polish: Wadyturkuł) is a commune in Transnistria, Moldova. It is composed of two villages, Molochișul Mic (Малий Молокіш, Малый Молокиш) and Vadul Turcului.

== Name ==
Its name means "Turk's ford" in Romanian.

== History ==
Wadyturkuł, as it was known in Polish, was a private village of the Lubomirski family, administratively located in the Bracław County in the Bracław Voivodeship in the Lesser Poland Province of the Kingdom of Poland. Following the Second Partition of Poland, it was annexed by Russia. In the late 19th century, it had a population of 626.

In 1924, it became part of the Moldavian Autonomous Oblast, which was soon converted into the Moldavian Autonomous Soviet Socialist Republic, and the Moldavian Soviet Socialist Republic in 1940 during World War II. From 1941 to 1944, it was administered by Romania as part of the Transnistria Governorate.

According to the 2004 census, the population of the locality was 1,220 inhabitants, of which 133 (10.9%) Moldovans (Romanians), 663 (54.34%) Ukrainians and 404 (33.11%) Russians.

== Sights ==
It is the site of the Church of the Blessed Virgin's Birth, a Russian Orthodox church featured on gold and silver coins issued in the series of Orthodox Temples (Transnistria) by Transnistria's Central Bank.
