= Sabbas Volkov =

Archbishop of Tiraspol and Dubăsari

Archbishop Savva (Volkov)
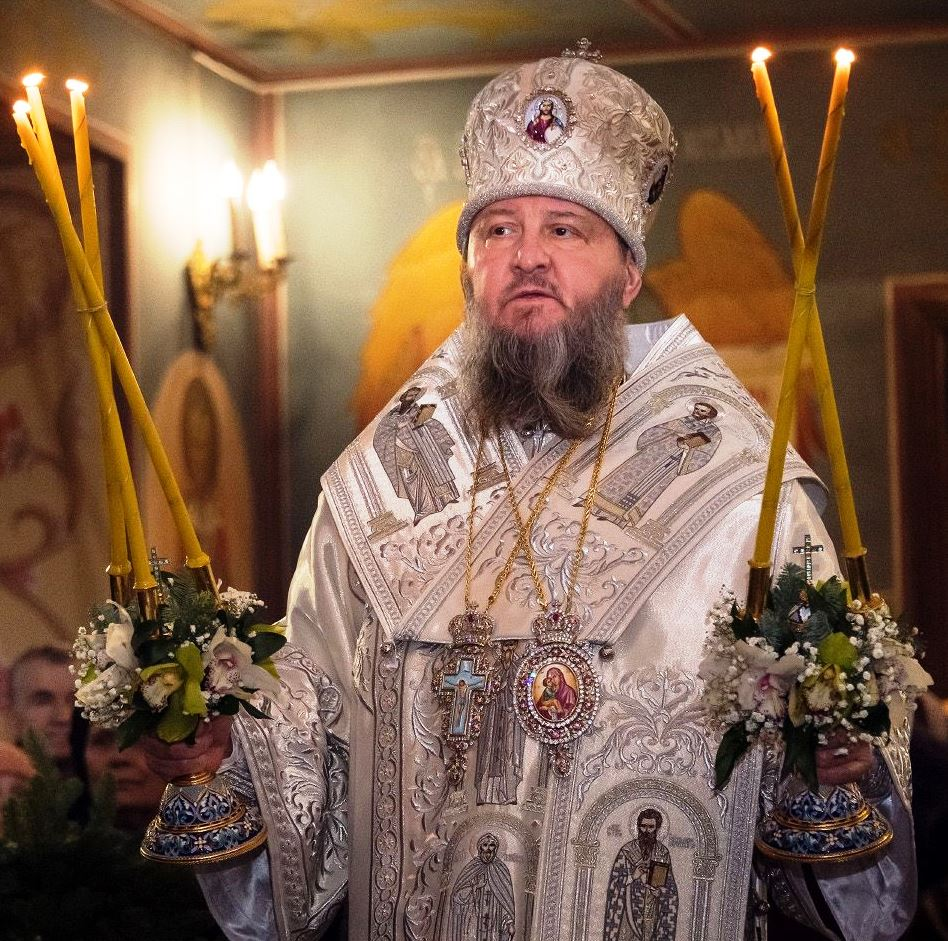
- Sabbas (January 6, 2019)
- Born: September 27, 1958 (age 67); Shigon, Mordovian ASSR
- Education: Moscow Theological Academy
- Church: Moldovan Orthodox Church
- Ordained: 1986 (monk/deacon/priest), 1995 (bishop)
- Title: Archbishop of Tiraspol and Dubăsari

Bishop Sabbas (or Savva; born Sergey Aleksandrovich Volkov on September 27, 1958) is a bishop of the Moldovan Orthodox Church under the Moscow Patriarchate. He serves as diocesan bishop of Tiraspol and Dubăsari.

== Life ==
Sergey Volkov was born into a working-class family in what is now Mordovia in 1958, from 1982 to 1984 serving in the Soviet Army.

Following his discharge in 1986 Sergey entered the Danilov Monastery in Moscow, in May 1986 being ordained a deacon. In December 1986 he was tonsured a monk with the name Sabbas.

In January 1987 Metropolitan Pitirim of Volokolamsk ordained Hierodeacon Sabbas as a priest. Later that year, in June, Hieromonk Sabbas was elevated to the rank of hegumen and still later, in March 1988, to the rank of archimandrite.

On September 12, 1995, Archimandrite Savva was consecrated to the episcopacy as titular Bishop of Krasnogorsk and appointed as a vicar of the patriarchal Eparchy of Moscow.

On March 5, 2010, the Holy Synod of the Russian Orthodox Church elected Bishop Savva as Bishop of the Tiraspol and Dubasari Eparchy of the Moldovan Orthodox Church in the breakaway state of Transnistria.

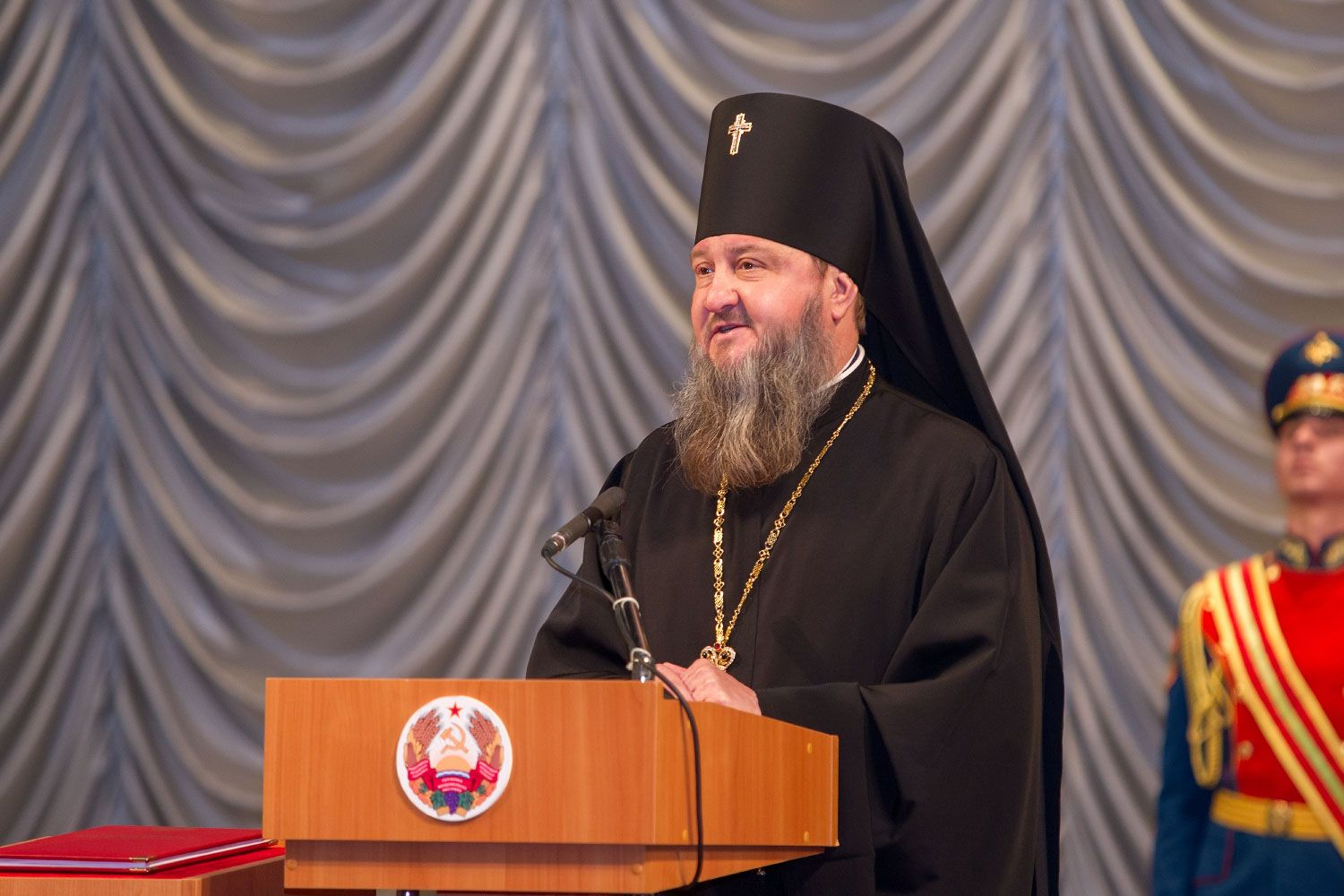
Savva Volkov in 2016

On February 3, 2013, Bishop Sabbas was elevated to the rank of archbishop.
