= Oxana Ionova =

Transnistrian economist

Oxana Ionova was the head of the state tax service of Transnistria and director of Transnistria's central bank from 2008 to 2011. She was born in Tiraspol on 3 June 1966. She started her work in the Ministry of Interior of Transnistria in 1994 as accountant. In 1997, she was appointed head of financial and economic department of the State Customs Committee of Transnistria. In 2000 President Igor Smirnov appointed Ionova as the new Minister of Revenues of Transnistria. After the reform of fiscal service and abolition of the separate ministry of revenues, Ionova was appointed head of state tax service of Transnistria. In 2008 President Smirnov proposed Ionova's candidature to the Supreme Council to be appointed as director of Transnistrian Republican Bank.

Oxana Ionova was considered to be a 'purse' of Igor Smirnov and his family, a person through which money was laundered. In 2011 the Investigation Committee of the Russian Federation opened a criminal case against Ionova on a charge of embezzlement of 160 million rubles of Russian humanitarian aid. On 13 March 2012, after 2011 presidential elections in Transnistria when Igor Smirnov lost power, the Transnistrian authorities arrested Ionova on charges of embezzlement of state property, illegal business practices, abuse of power and forgery. It was reported that during search of her villa police exempted her collection of golden coins and gold bars. Her case went to court on 11 March 2013.
