= Noul Neamț Monastery =

Coordinates: 46.7856°N 29.6081°E

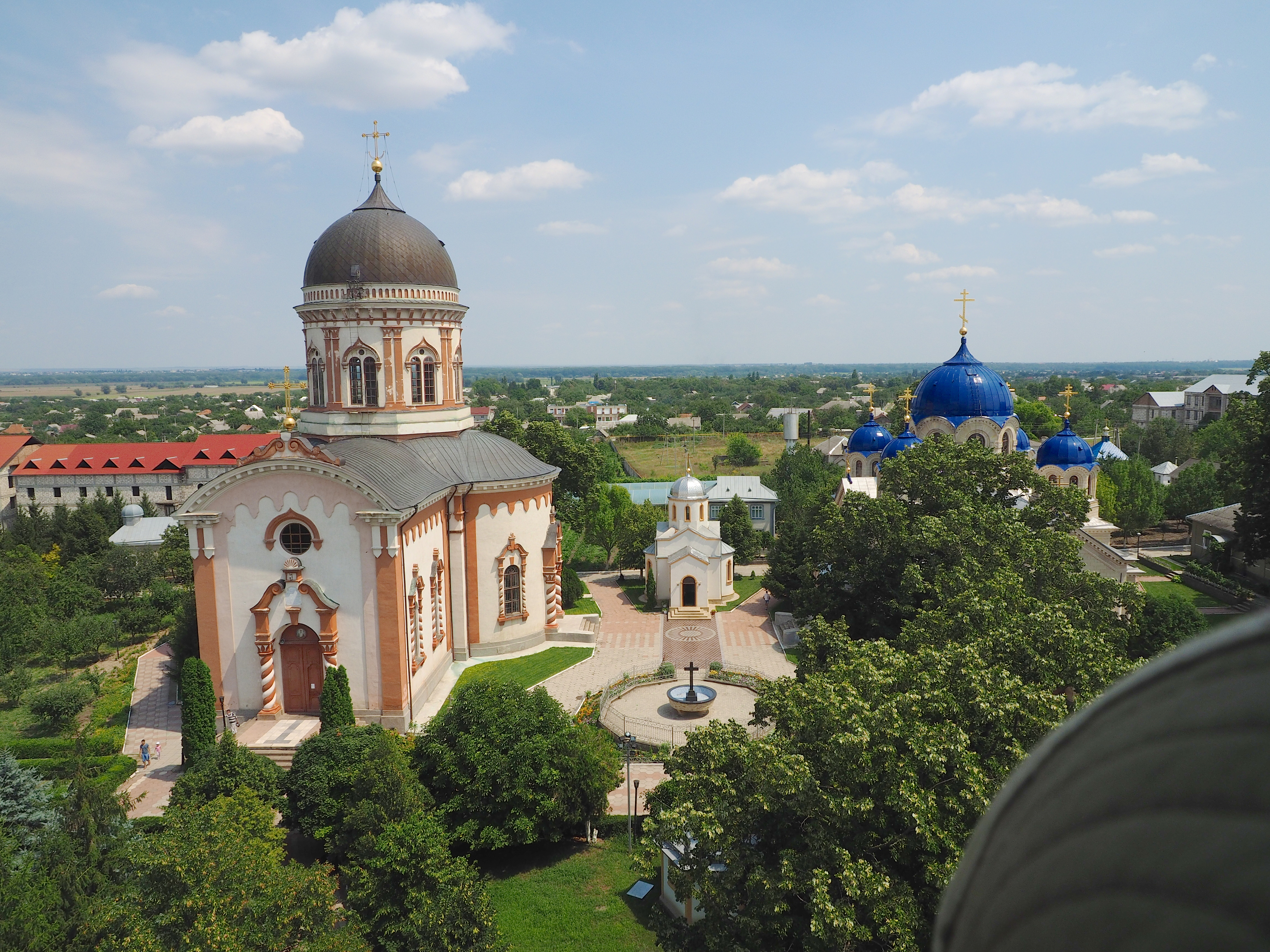
- Noul Neamț Monastery
- Location: Chițcani
- Country: Transnistria, Moldova
- Denomination: Eastern Orthodoxy

History
- Status: Monastery
- Founded: 1864

Noul Neamț Monastery (Romanian: Mănăstirea Noul Neamț; Russian: Вознесенский Ново-Нямецкий (Кицканский) монастырь, romanized: Voznesensky Novo-Nyametsky (Kitskansky) monastyr') is an all-male Moldovan Orthodox monastery located in Chițcani, near Bender and Tiraspol. Geographically located in the historical region of Basarabia, it is today controlled by the breakaway Transnistrian authorities. It is also known as Chițcani Monastery.

== Overview ==
The name (which means "New Neamț" in English) signifies that the monastery is a successor of the Neamț Monastery in medieval Moldavia.

The monastery was founded in 1861, when several monks from the Neamț monastery left and founded Noul-Neamț in Chițcani. The founding of the new monastery was a protest against the measures taken in United Principalities of Romania to confiscate monastery estates and forbid the usage of Slavonic language in worship. At the time, Chițcani, like all of Bessarabia, was part of the Russian Empire since 1812.

On 16 May 1962 Soviet authorities closed the monastery; the buildings became a hospital.

The monastery church was reopened in 1989, followed in 1991 by the Romanian-language school for Orthodox priests, under the leadership of Wincenty Morari, bishop of Bender. Since 1992, the town is controlled by the internationally not recognised state of Transnistria.

== Gallery ==
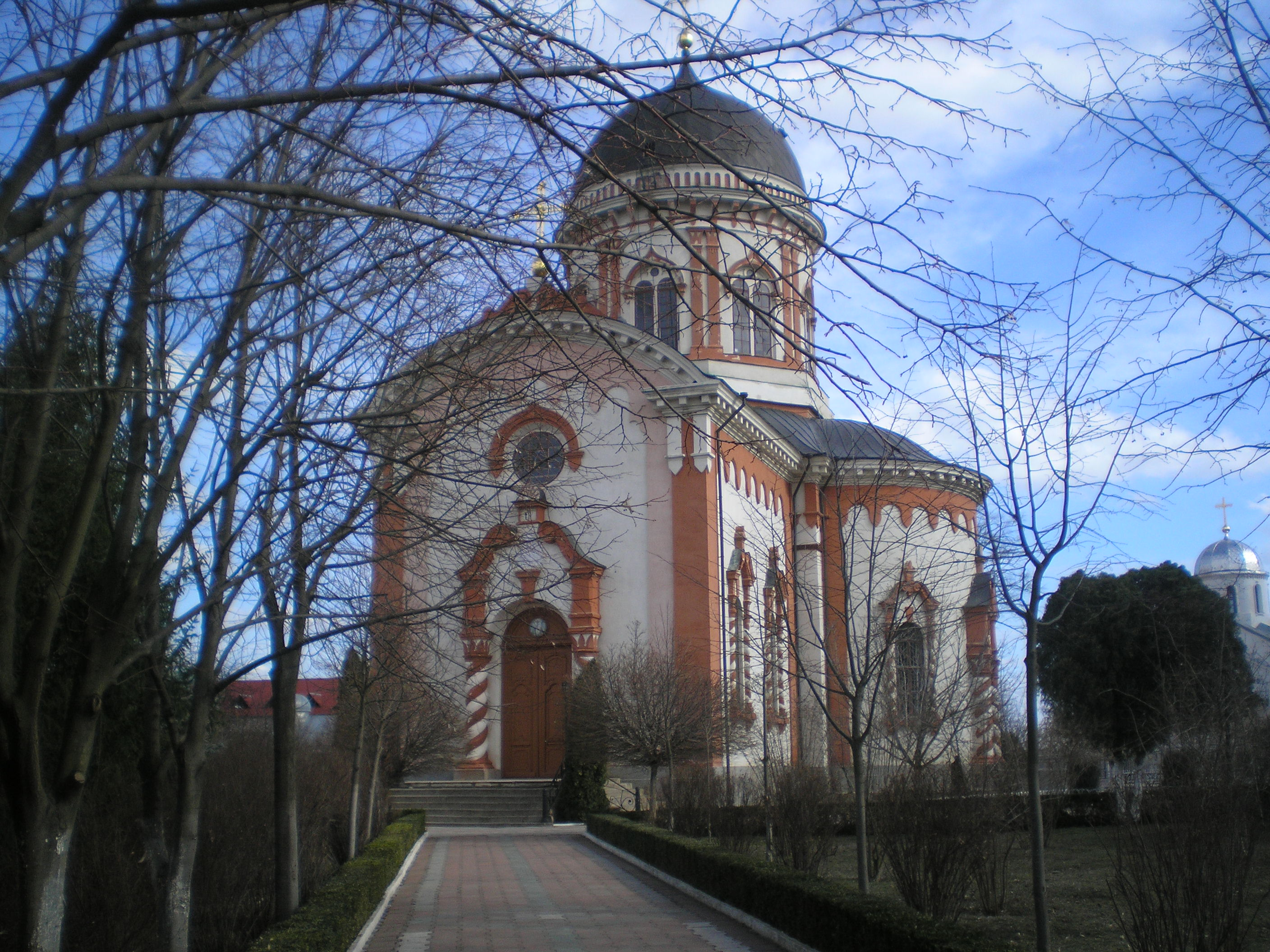

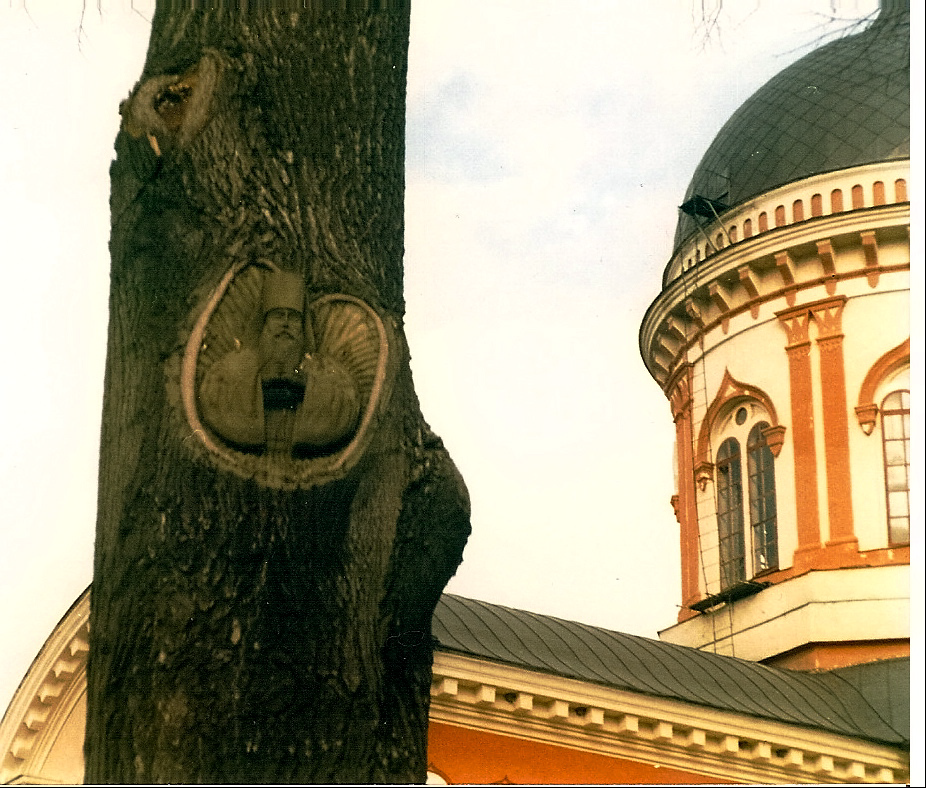
Carving in a tree on the territory of the monastery

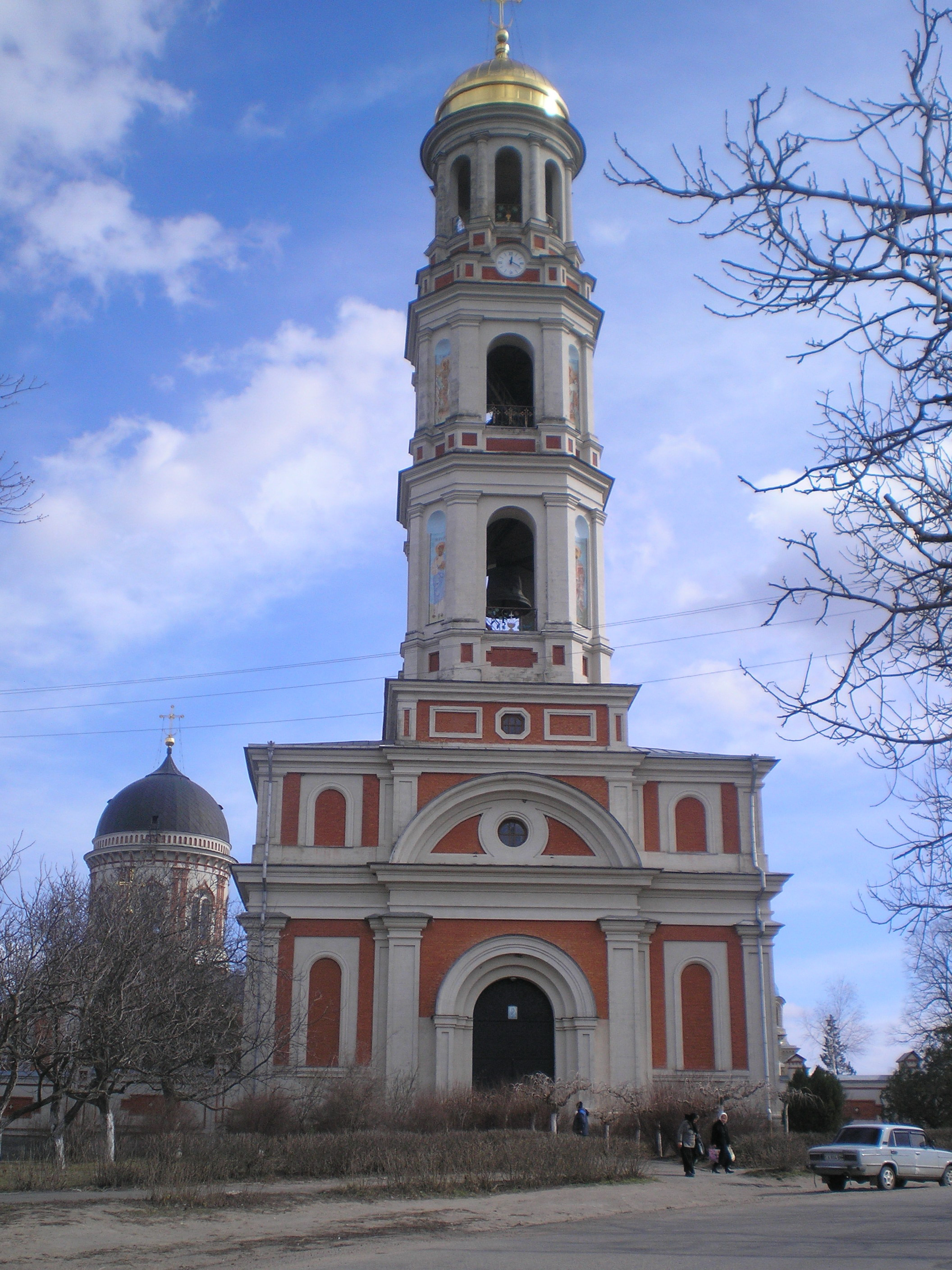

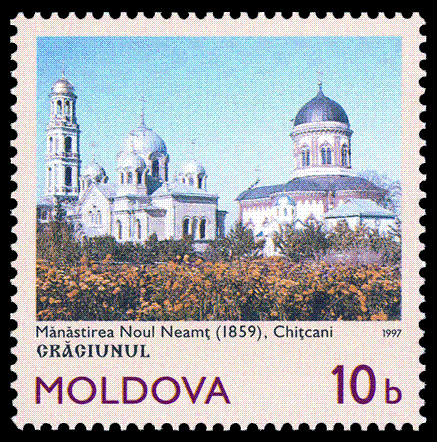
1997 stamp

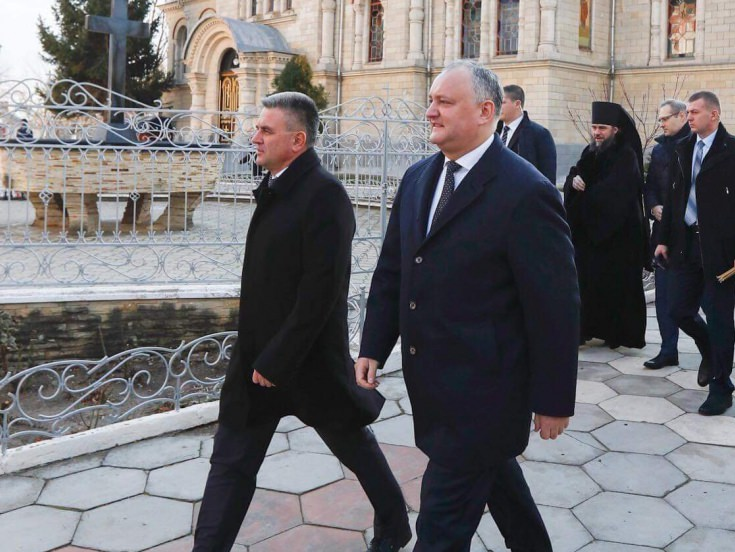
Igor Dodon and Vadim Krasnoselsky visiting the monastery, 2018
