= KVINT =

Winery and distillery in Tirapsol, Transnistria

- Industry: Beverages
- Founded: 1897; 129 years ago
- Headquarters: Tiraspol, Transnistria (Moldova)
- Products: Alcoholic beverages: Spirits and wine
- Website: kvint.md

KVINT (acronym for Kon’iaki, vina i napitki Tiraspol’ia ("cognacs, wines, and beverages of Tiraspol")) is a winery and distillery based in Tiraspol, the capital and industrial center of Transnistria. Kvint products are certified 'Made in Moldova'. Founded in 1897, the company produced only vodka until 1938, when it began producing brandies. It is the oldest still-operating commercial enterprise in the region. Locals consider KVINT a national treasure and a symbol of their country. Its factory is shown on the 5 Transnistrian ruble banknote.

KVINT is one of Transnistria's largest exporters, to Italy and China as well as Russia and Ukraine; its brandy has gone to the Vatican and into space.

The main part of Transnistria lies east of the Dniester River. The grapes grown here are Cognac variety. KVINT's award-winning Prince Wittgenstein brandy incorporates "Bianca, Aligoté, Pervenets of Magarach [Pervenet Magaracea], Riesling, Riton, Suruchensky White, Ugni Blanc, [and] Colombard" grapes. The company also grows traditionally European red grapes, such as "Malbec, Ancelotti, Saperavi, Viognier, [and] Syrah (Shiraz)."

The company was privatized in 2006 and is owned by the conglomerate Sheriff Ltd. Bottles are labeled "Made in Moldova" because Transnistria is not recognized as a sovereign country and bottles must be printed with the name of a country of origin. Its annual production is approximately ten million litres of alcoholic drinks. In 2014 its annual revenues were about $50 million, about 5% of Transnistria's GDP.

KVINT obtained ISO 9001-94 certification in 2000 and ISO 9001-2000 in 2003. The factory is among a few enterprises in the former Soviet Union which can assure a kosher production process.

== Visits ==
Daily tours on weekdays at 15:00 local time (conducted in English and Russian) are undertaken.

== Gallery ==
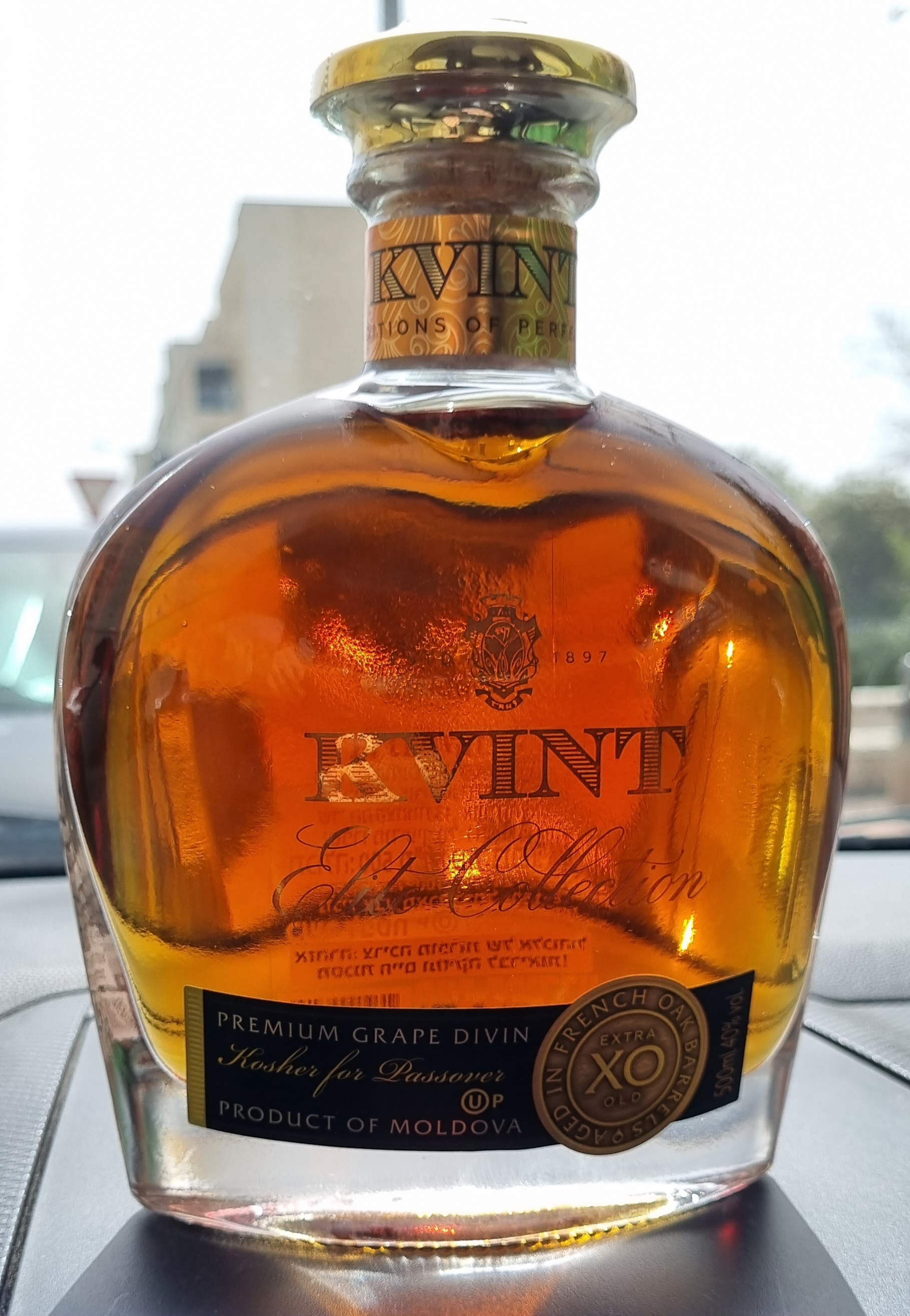
Kvint Premium Grape Divin XO Kosher, bottle

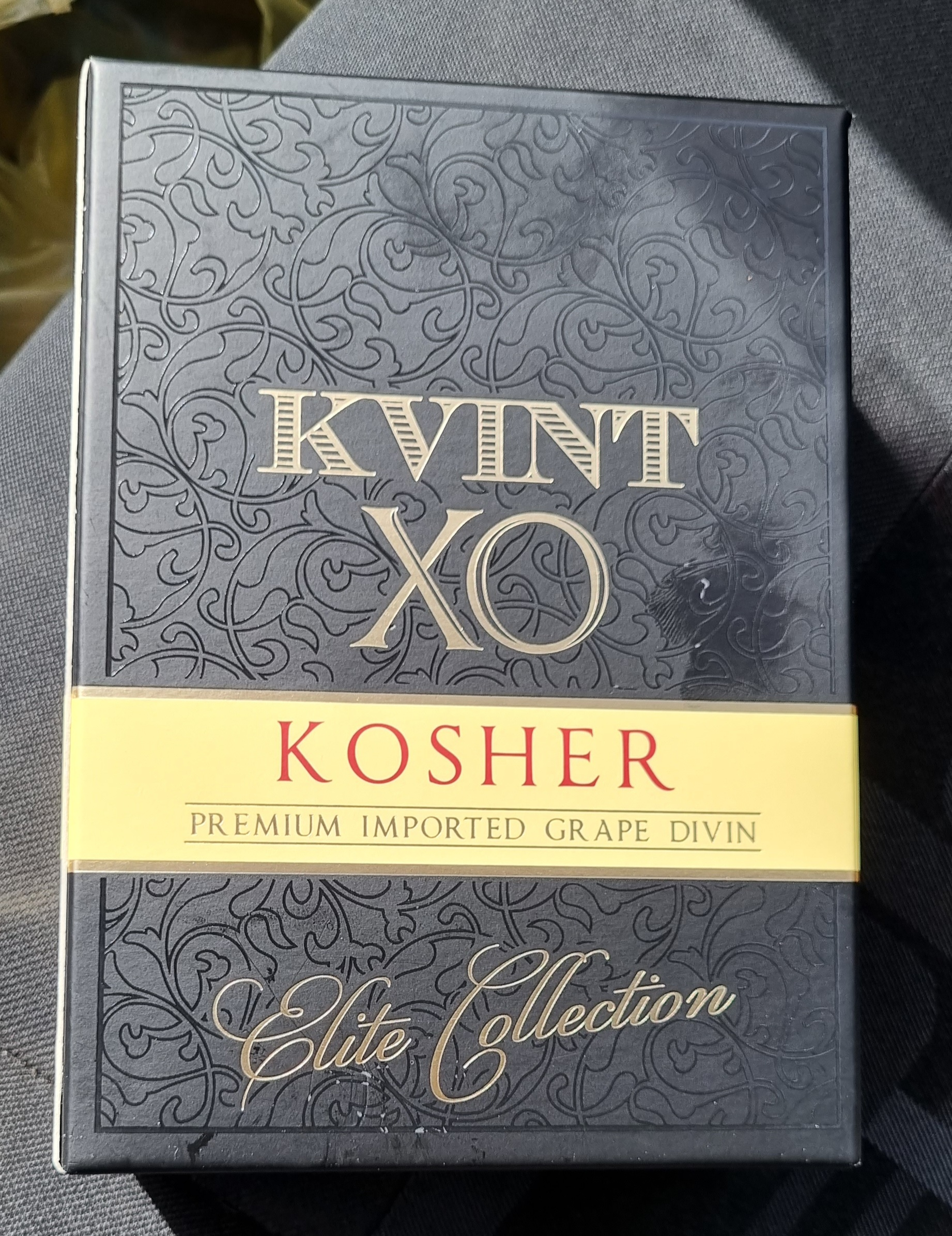
Kvint Premium Grape Divin XO Kosher, box

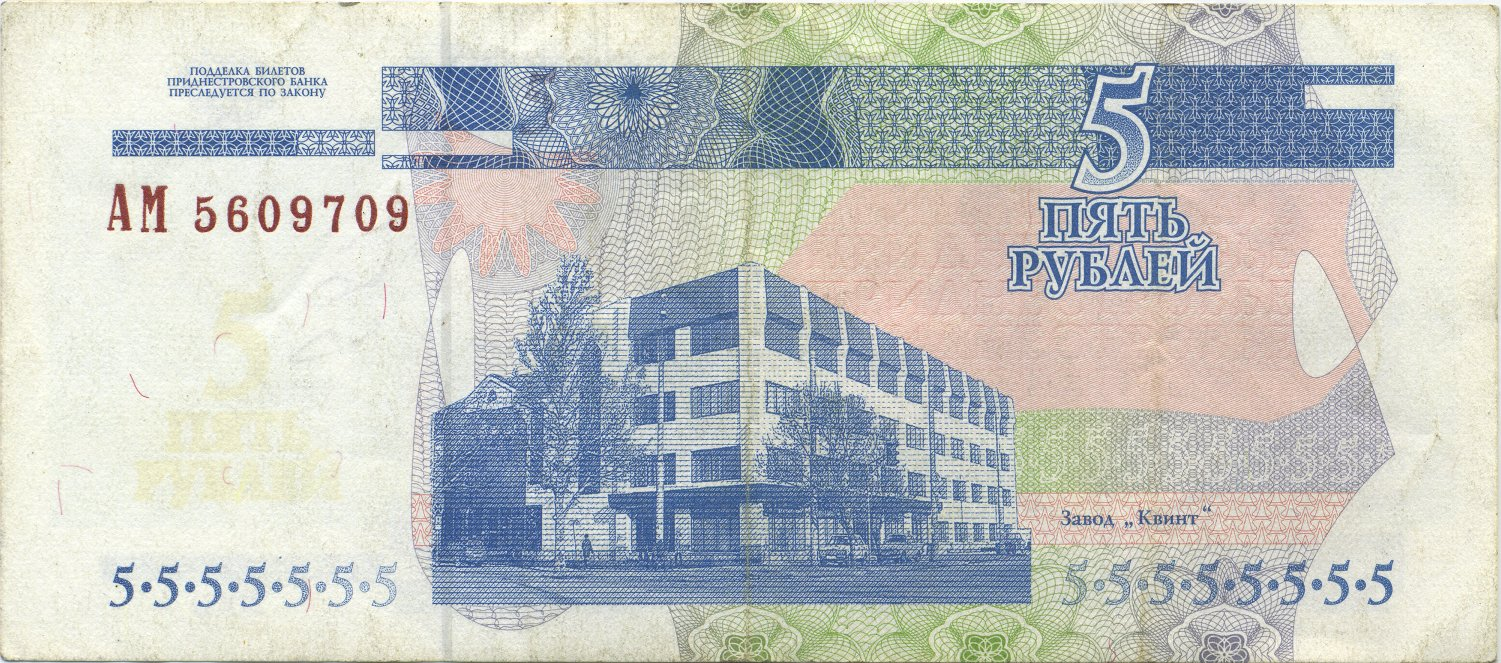
5 Transnistrian ruble banknote
