= Church of the Nativity, Tiraspol =

Orthodox cathedral in Tiraspol, Transnistria

Coordinates: 46.8375°N 29.6144°E

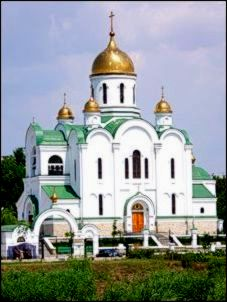
Nativity Church in Tiraspol

The Church of the Nativity (Romanian: Catedrala Nașterii Domnului din Tiraspol, Moldovan Cyrillic: Катедрала Наштерий Домнулуй дин Тираспол, Cathedral of the Nativity of the Lord in Tiraspol), also known as the Cathedral of the Birth of Christ (Russian: Собор Рождества Христова, romanized: Sobor Rozhdestva Khristova, Cathedral of the Nativity of Christ), is the largest and newest church in Tiraspol, the capital of Transnistria. It is a Russian Orthodox Church completed in 1999 to serve as the mother church of the Orthodox Christian Diocese of Tiraspol.

Celebrations marking the completion of the cathedral included, among other things, the issuing of a series of postage stamps featuring the church (see Transnistrian stamps issued for Christmas 1999). In 2001, the cathedral's image was displayed on the principal coins struck for a commemorative series of gold and silver currency featuring Orthodox Temples of Transnistria.

== Sources ==
- Sobor-Tiraspol.com: О соборе — Кафедральный собор Рождества Христова (accessed 16 February 2024)
- J. Solak, Mołdawia: republika na trzy pęknięta. Historyczno-społeczny, militarny i geopolityczny wymiar „zamrożonego konfliktu” o Naddniestrze, Wydawnictwo Adam Marszałek, Toruń 2014, ISBN 9788377809976, p. 71
- Tiras.ru: Свеча поставленная пред Господом. Новости Приднестровья: ИА «Тирас» (accessed 16 February 2024)
- ИСТОРИЯ (history of the diocese of Tiras) (accessed 16 February 2024)
- President.gospmr.ru: Патриарх Московский и всея Руси Кирилл: «Осуществилось желание моего сердца – посетить приднестровскую землю». Официальный сайт Президента ПМР (accessed 16 February 2024)
- P. Oleksy, Wspólnota z przypadku. Studium tożsamości mieszkańców Naddniestrza, Instytut Kultury Europejskiej, Gniezno 2016, p. 55 & 57
