= Transnistrian Republican Bank =

Central bank of Transnistria

Transnistrian Republican Bank Приднестровский республиканский банк
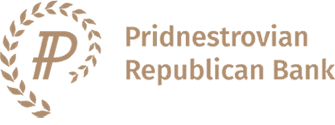

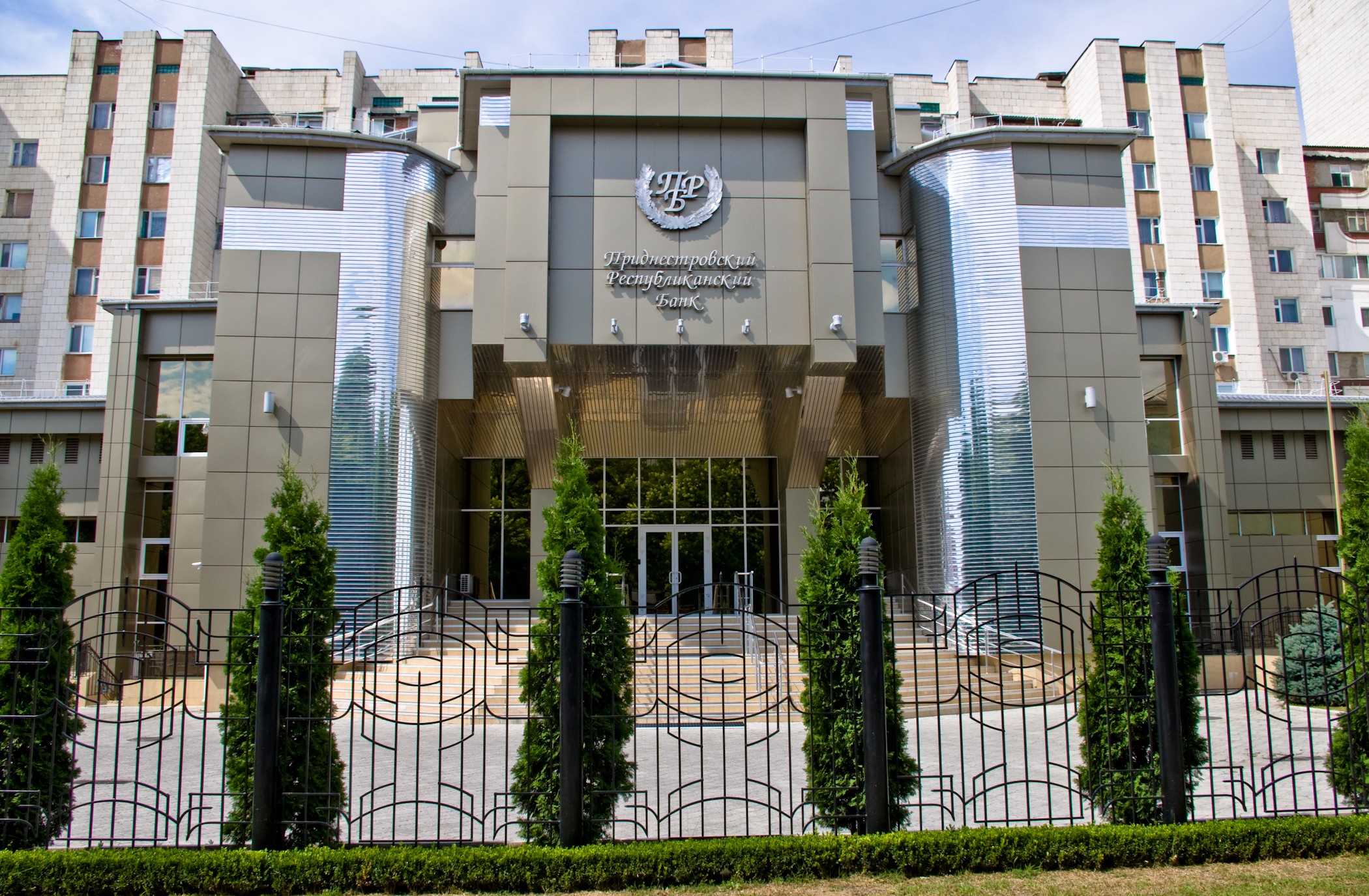
- Headquarters
- Central bank of: Transnistria
- Headquarters: Tiraspol
- Chairman: Vladislav Tidva
- Currency: Transnistrian ruble

The Transnistrian Republican Bank, or locally, the Pridnestrovian Republican Bank (Note: Russian: Приднестровский республиканский банк, romanized: Pridnestrovskiy respublikanskiy bank; Romanian: Banca Republicană Transnistreană or Nistreană, Moldovan Cyrillic: Банка Републиканэ Нистрянэ; Ukrainian: Приднiстровський Республiканський Банк) is the central bank of Transnistria. It issues its own currency, the Transnistrian ruble, and also a series of memorial gold and silver coins, among them The Outstanding People of Pridnestrovie.

== History ==
The Transnistrian Republican Bank has largely been held afloat by economic intervention from Russia who is the only state that has provided financial assistance to Transnistria, however, since 2014, Russian aid has steadily declined forcing the Transnistrian Republican Bank to rely further on domestic and Moldovan financial institutions, investments and credit.

In October 2006, the bank inaugurated a new headquarters of a size of 40,000 square feet (3,700 m^{2}) in Tiraspol.

As part of the 5+2 format Moldovan officials had the opportunity to begin an integration of the Transnistrian economy into a union with Moldova which would have seen a joint bank, currency, and custom's union between the two, however, the presence of the Operational Group of Russian Forces prevented any meaningful dialogues and the talks of integration ended with the Russian invasion of Ukraine.

However, due to the Russian invasion of Ukraine, Transnistria's border with Ukraine as closed, meaning that 76% of the Transnistrian economy is dependent on exports to the European Union through Moldova, allowing new talks for economic integration as Transnistria declared a “a regime of economic emergency” which has seen the bank implement a new series of fiscal reform as Transnistrian authorities move towards more austere spending, namely by increasing taxes to reduce the amount of Transnistrian Rubles in circulation to reduce inflation rates, however, due to the slashing of foreign credit entering the bank these policies are unlikely to succeed without Moldovan support. Moldovan authorities have hinted they are willing to legalize the use of VISA or Mastercard payments to the Transnistrian Republican Bank, which they have blocked since Transnistria declared independence.

== Chairmen of the Pridnestrovian Republican Bank ==
- Vyatcheslav Zagryadsky (22 December 1992 – 1995)
- Vitaly Kanysh, acting (1995)
- Vladimir Borisov, acting (1995–1997)
- Oleg Natakhin (1997 – 13 April 1998)
- Eduard Kosovsky (13 April 1998 – 2005)
- Aleksei Melnik, acting (2005)
- Eduard Kosovsky (2005 – 16 July 2007)
- Aleksei Melnik, acting (16 July 2007 – 23 April 2008)
- Oxana Ionova (23 April 2008 – 30 December 2011)
- Olga Radulova, acting (30 December 2011 – 1 February 2012)
- Eduard Kosovsky (1 February 2012 – December 2016)
- Vladislav Tidva (December 2016–present)

== See also ==
- List of central banks
