= Diocese of Tiraspol and Dubăsari =

Coordinates: 46.8390°N 29.6140°E

Diocese of Tiraspol and Dubăsari Eparhia de Tiraspol și Dubăsari Тираспольская и Дубоссарская епархия
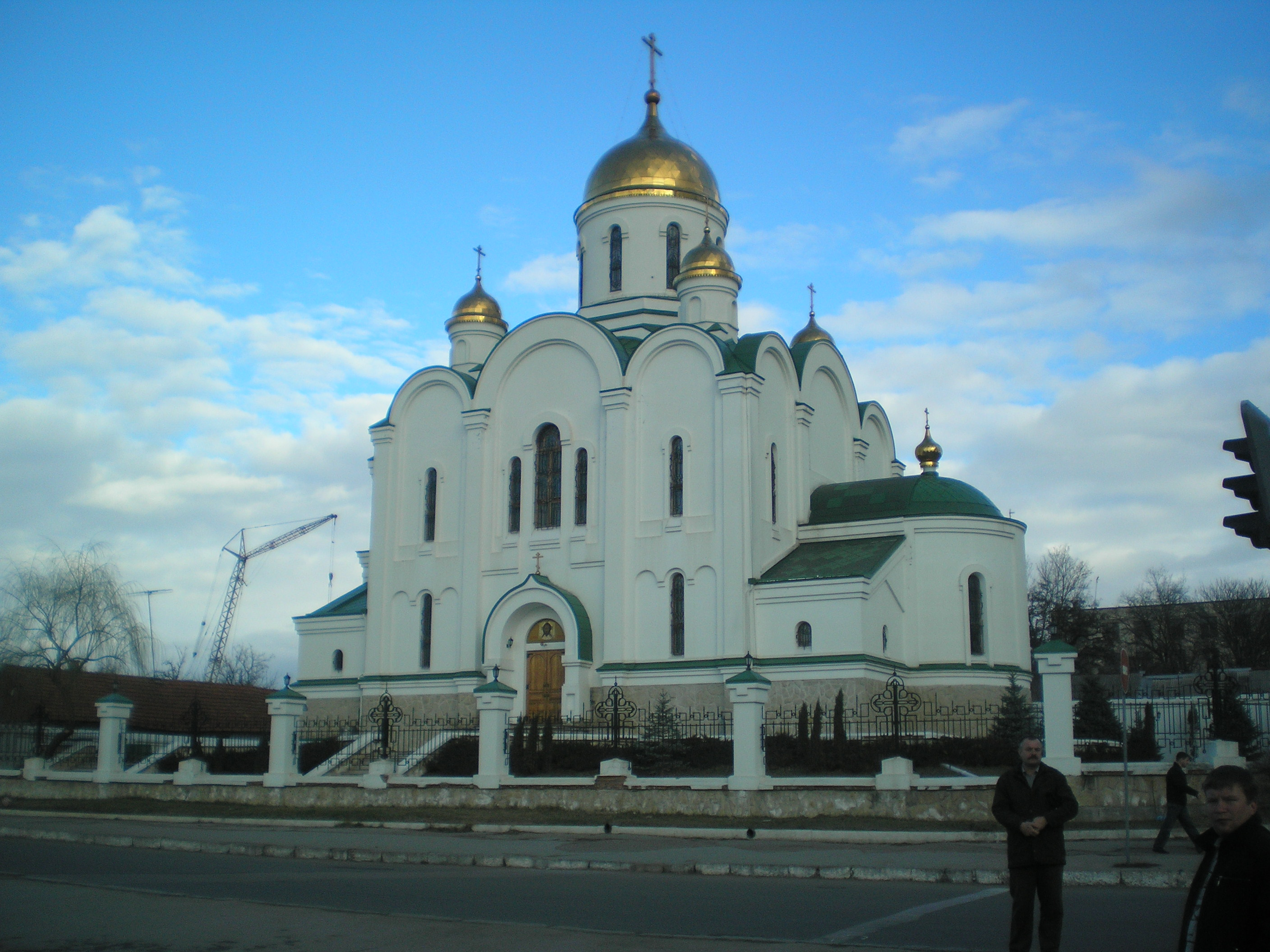
- Church of the Nativity

Location
- Country: Moldova
- Territory: Transnistria
- Subdivisions: 5 deaneries

Statistics
- Area: 4,163 km^{2} (1,607 sq mi)
- Population: Total: 533,500

Information
- Cathedral: Church of the Nativity

Current leadership
- Bishop: Sabbas (Volkov)

Website
- www.diocese-tiras.org

The Diocese of Tiraspol and Dubăsari (Russian: Тираспольская и Дубоссарская епархия, romanized: Tiraspolskaya i Dubossarskaya yeparkhiya; Romanian: Eparhia de Tiraspol și Dubăsari, Moldovan Cyrillic: Епархия де Тираспол ши Дубэсарь; Ukrainian: Тираспольська і Дубоссарська єпархія, romanized: Tyraspolska i Dubossarska yeparkhiya) is a diocese of the Metropolis of Chișinău and All Moldova which covers the exact territory of Transnistria, Moldova. The newly built (1999) Christmas Church in the region's capital, Tiraspol, is the Mother Church of this diocese.

It is headed by Bishop Savva and supported by the Moscow Patriarchate.

The diocese was established on October 6, 1998, by the Holy Synod of the Russian Orthodox Church to organize the Orthodox Church in the breakaway Pridnestrovian Moldavian Republic.

As of 2010 the diocese consisted of 104 parishes and 2 monasteries served by 104 full-time priests and 14 deacons.

== See also ==
- Metropolis of Bessarabia#Structure and organization
