= Chițcani =

Chițcani Кицканы
- Commune
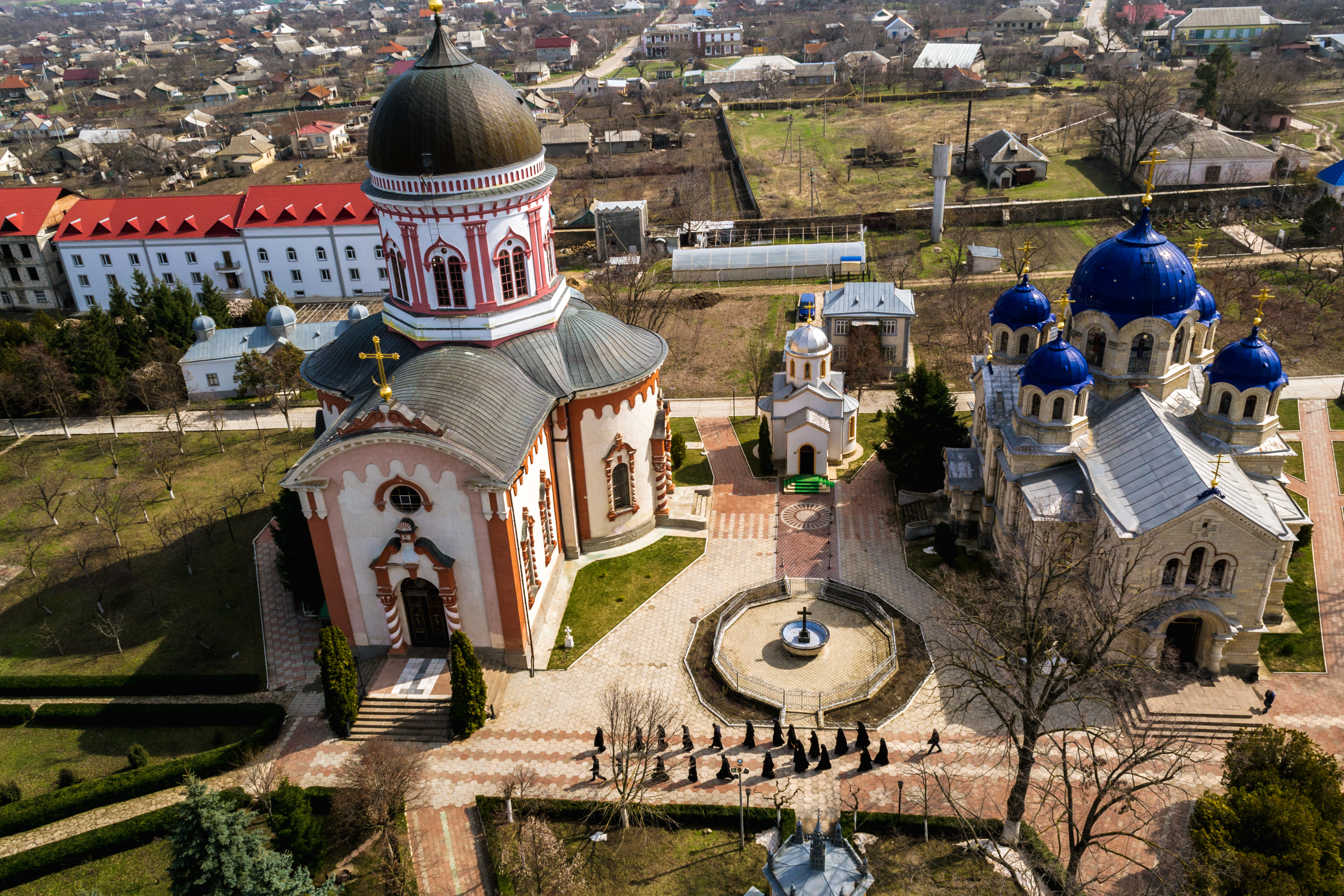
- Noul Neamț Monastery

- Location within Moldova
- Coordinates: 46°47′N 29°37′E
- Country (de jure): Moldova
- District (de jure): Căușeni
- Country (de facto): Transnistria
- District (de facto): Slobozia

Population (2004)
  - Total: 9,000
- Time zone: UTC+2 (EET)
  - Summer (DST): UTC+3 (EEST)

Chițcani (Moldovan Cyrillic: Кицкань, pronounced [kitsˈkanʲ]; Russian: Кицканы, romanized: Kitskany; Ukrainian: Кіцкань, romanized: Kitskan) is a commune in Căușeni District, in south-eastern Moldova. It consists of the village Chițcani and two small villages (hamlets), Merenești and Zahorna. Chițcani is situated to the south-east of the city of Tighina (Bender). The locality, although situated on the right (western) bank of the river Dniester, is under the control of the breakaway Transnistrian authorities. On the opposite side of the river lies the city of Tiraspol.

The village is also well known as the home of the Noul Neamț Monastery. The monastery was closed when Moldova was under the Soviet Union. It was then used as a hospital, a storehouse, then as a makeshift museum.

== History ==
Chițcani is one of the oldest recorded villages in Moldova, its history dating back to 1367. The name of the village means 'shrews' in Romanian language.

In the interwar period, the village was part of Plasa Căușani of Tighina County in Romania.

During the 1992 War of Transnistria, especially during the months of June and July, Chițcani was the scene of several gun-battles between the Moldovan police and army on one side, and Transnistrian separatists and Russia's 14th Army on the other side. After the Moldovans retreated when the war ended, the village was the scene of human rights abuses perpetrated by the Transnistrians, who took revenge on the locals that had supported the Moldovan police. According to the Helsinki Committee for Human Rights in Moldova, there were some alleged 20 killings between 1996 and 2000. Moldovan authorities have stated that they have no access to the village to investigate these cases, while Transnistrian authorities denied the allegations and refused to investigate.

On 25 September 2023, at approximately 00:50 in the morning, the warhead of an S-300 missile fell into Chițcani, in a resident's garden. There were no victims, but the incident caused fear among the locals, this being a densely populated area, 10 kilometres (6.2 miles) from Tiraspol. At the moment, it was not known what country fired the missile or which trajectory did it follow before crashing. This was the first such incident to take place in Transnistria since the start of the Russian invasion of Ukraine.

== Demographics ==
According to the 2004 census, the population of the commune stands at 9,266 people, of which 4,921 ethnic Russians, 3,153 ethnic Moldovans, and 969 ethnic Ukrainians.

At the 1930 Romanian Census, there were 4,744 inhabitants in Chițcani, including the 2,456 Romanians, 2,146 Russians, 71 Ruthenians and Ukrainians, 35 Jews, 16 Gypsies, 7 Poles, 3 Bulgarians, 2 Gagauzians, and 8 unclear. 2,426 people named Romanian as native language, 2,245 named Russian, 35 named Yiddish, 27 named Ukrainian, 5 named Gypsy, 3 named Bulgarian, 2 named Turkish, and 1 non-declared.
