= Faif =

Faif or FAIF may refer to:

- Garry Faif (1942–2002), Soviet and French architect, sculptor and engineer
- Free as in Freedom, 2002 biography by Sam Williams
- Fjärdsjömåla AIF, a Swedish football club
- FAIF, the fleet marine force of the Argentina Marines

== See also ==
- Football Association of the Irish Free State (FAIFS), former name of the Football Association of Ireland, the governing body for association football in the Republic of Ireland
