= Fjärdsjömåla AIF =

Swedish football club

- Full name: Fjärdsjömåla Allmäna Idrottsförening
- Nicknames: FAIF, Fjöset, Sveriges Milan
- Short name: FAIF
- Founded: 1949
- Ground: Fjärdsjömåla IP, Fjärdsjömåla, Sweden
- League: Division 6 Blekinge
Home colours	Away colours

Fjärdsjömåla AIF, FAIF, is a Swedish football club in Fjärdsjömåla, Karlskrona, Blekinge founded in 1949.
