= Suvorov Monument (Tiraspol) =

Monument to Tiraspol

Monument to Suvorov
- Памятник Суворову
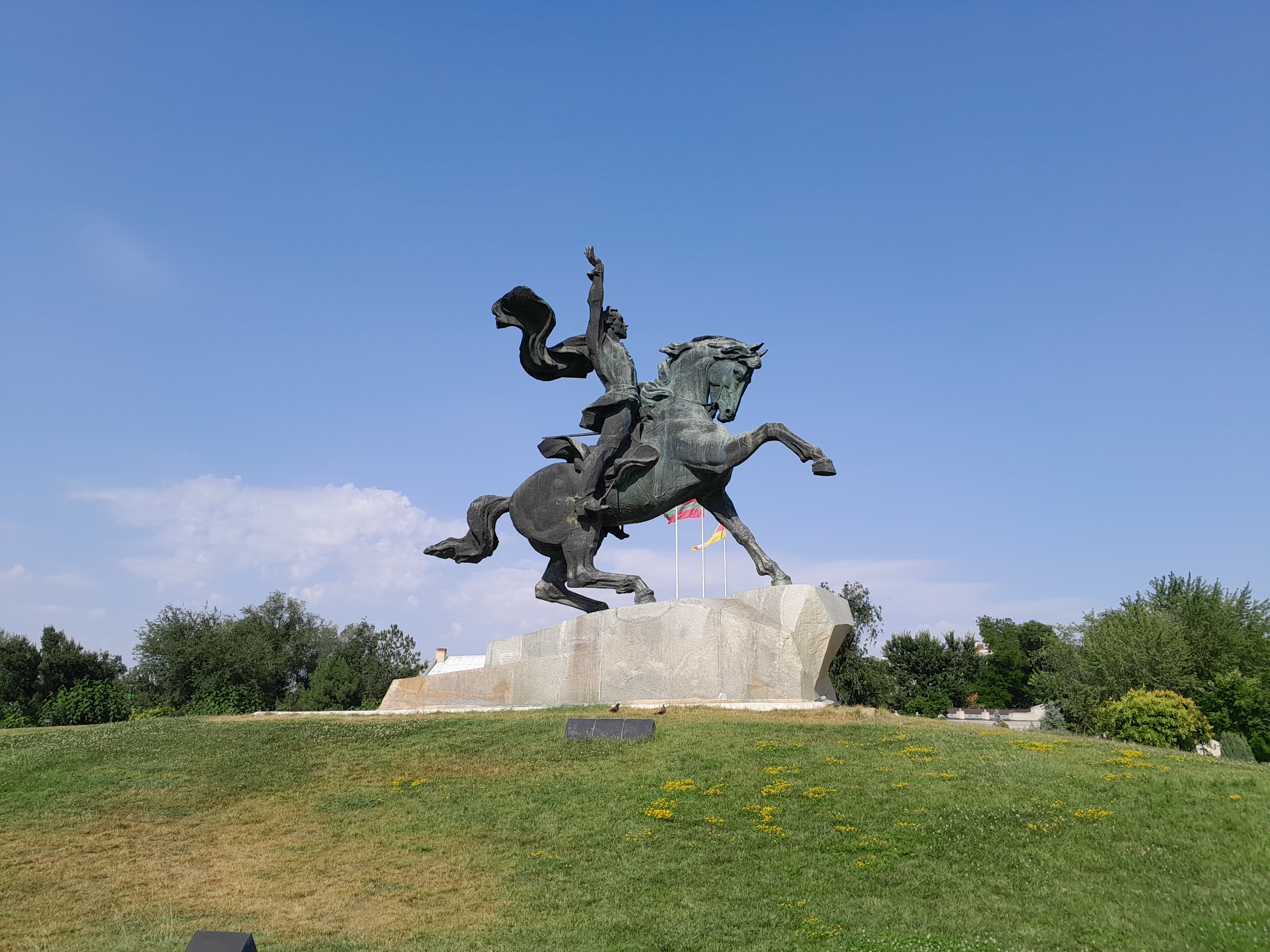
- The monument in 2025
- Interactive map of Monument to Suvorov
- Location: Suvorov Square, Tiraspol, Pridnestrovie (Moldova)
- Material: Bronze
- Completion date: 23 November 1979
- Dedicated to: Alexander Suvorov

Monument to Suvorov (Russian: Памятник Суворову) is a monument to Russian generalissimo Alexander Suvorov located on the Suvorov Square in Tiraspol, capital city of the unrecognized country of Pridnestrovie. According to the director of the Tiraspol United Museum Alla Melnichuk, this monument is considered one of the best artistic monuments to Suvorov in the territory of the former USSR.

== History ==
The monument was erected in 1979. Sculptors were Vladimir and Valentin Artamonov, while the architects were Y. Druzhinin and Y. Chistyakov. It is located on a small hill on Suvorov Square, the main square of the Pridnestrovian capital. The monument was awarded the Yevgeny Vuchetich Gold Medal.

Alexander Suvorov is considered the founder of Tiraspol, since it was on his instructions that the Tiraspol fortress was laid on the left bank of the Dniester in 1792 as part of the organization of the Dniester line.

In 2013, it was planned to restore the outer coating of the monument to Alexander Suvorov, which suffered after cleaning from dust and other pollution. A few years ago, a major overhaul of the pedestal was carried out, on which cracks were found.

== Monument on symbols, banknotes and postage stamps ==
The Monument to Suvorov is one of the famous symbols of the city of Tiraspol and the whole of Pridnestrovie.

The monument is depicted on the first banknotes of the Pridnestrovian Moldavian Republic (PMR) in denominations of 50, 100, 200, 500, 1000 rubles of 1993, 5000 rubles of 1995, 500.000 rubles of 1997 release.

In 1997, a postage stamp of the PMR depicted the Monument to Suvorov with the literal denomination "A" and "B".

In 2013, a new postage stamp of Pridnestrovie called the "Monument to Suvorov in Tiraspol" was issued with the letter denominations "A" and "U".
