= Memorial of Glory (Tiraspol) =

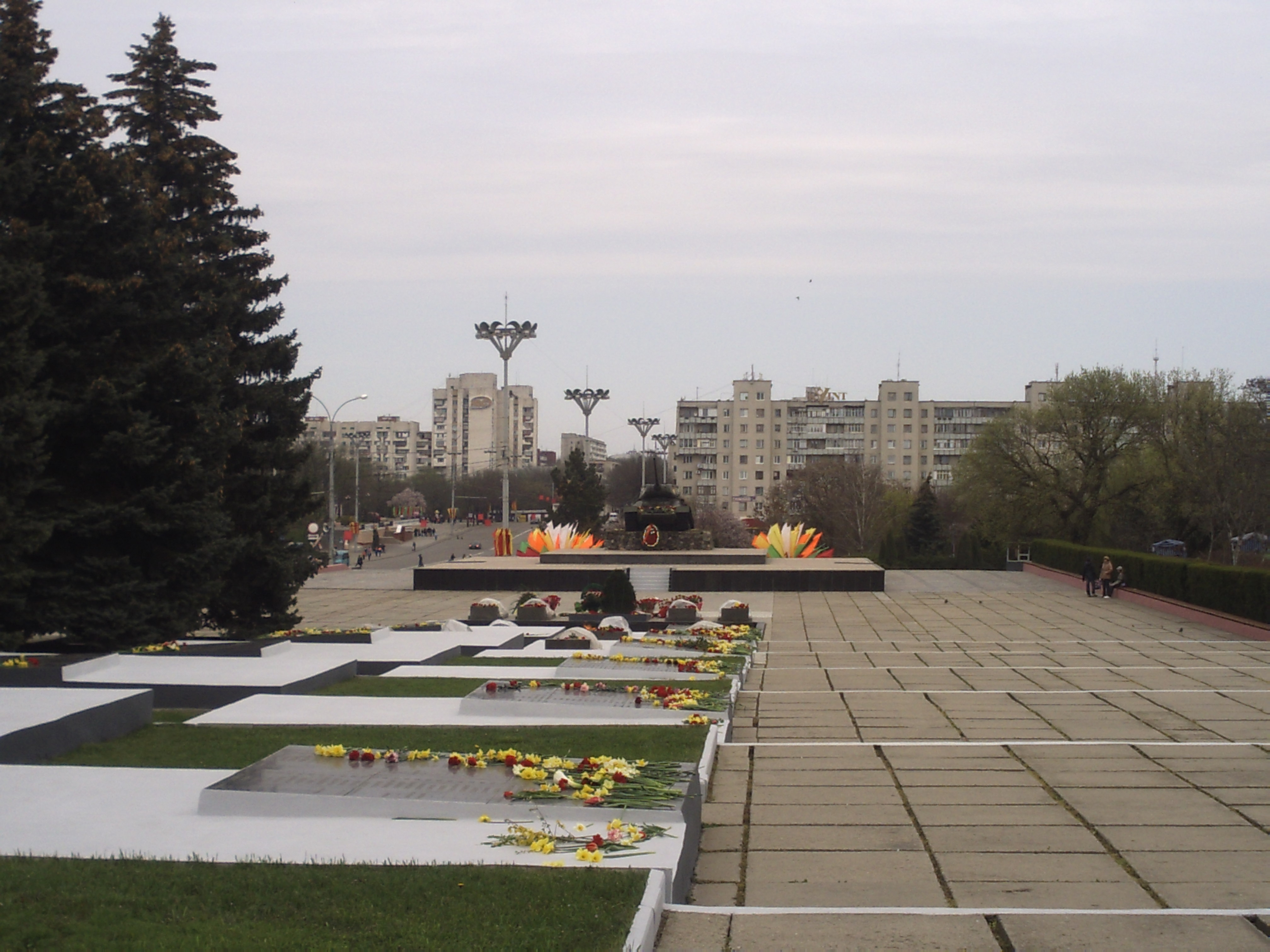
- Interactive map of Memorial of Glory
- Type: Memorial
- Location: Tiraspol, Transnistria (Moldova)
- Coordinates: 46°50′7″N 29°36′29″E
- Created: 1972
- Status: All year

Memorial of Glory (Russian: Мемориал Славы, romanized: Memorial Slavy; Romanian: Memorialul Gloriei) is a city memorial located on Suvorov Square of Tiraspol, the capital of Transnistria, an unrecognized breakaway region of Moldova. It commemorates the veterans and the dead of the Eastern Front of World War II, the Soviet-Afghan War, and the Transnistria War.

== History ==
=== Early years ===
In the 1920s, a square was located on the site of the Memorial of Glory. The commissioner of the cavalry brigade Grigory Kotovsky was buried there during the Russian Civil War after the takeover of Tiraspol from White Guard control. The decision to create a memorial complex in Tiraspol was made in the early 1970s. The construction of the memorial was very popular within the city. The construction of the memorial saw the participation of all organizations, enterprises and educational institutions of the city, with civil servants such as office workers assisting every day after work for 5 hours in the construction of the memorial. The construction process at that time was headed by Hero of Socialist Labor I. D. Dyachenko. The authors of the project were sculptors Leonid Fishbein and Garry Faif. The complex was opened on Defender of the Fatherland Day in 1972. That same day, a solemn ceremony of the reburial of Red Army soldiers and officers at the complex was held (mostly natives of Transnistria and other parts of the Moldovan SSR). When the Memorial of Glory was opened, employees of the Tiraspol Museum of History and Local Lore wrote about 900 letters to the relatives and friends of the soldiers buried at the memorial.

=== Later developments ===
The T-34-85 tank erected at the memorial was transported from Hungary in April 1945. During the Second World War, it was a combat vehicle of Lieutenant Boris Sergeev, who served with his father, Vasily Antonovich Sergeev, a prominent Colonel in the Red Army. Boris and his crew died under the Budapest Offensive (January 1945) and the machine was transported back to the territory of the Soviet Union, according to the request of his father. Under it is stored a capsule with soil brought from the city of Volgograd. The last burials at the Glory Memorial were held in 1992. Among them was Nikolai Ostapenko, the head of the Slobozia District Council of People's Deputies, who died on 30 April 1992 during the Transnistrian War. Another part of the memorial is a monument opened in 1995 dedicated to the soldiers who died in the Soviet-Afghan War.

=== Reconstruction ===
In 2009-2010, the Glory Memorial was reconstructed. During the reconstruction, the Wall of Memory was erected, on which the names of all the fighters in the secessionist side of the Transnistrian War who died in 1990-1992 are carved. There is also a sculpture of the Grieving Mother. For the repair of the Glory Memorial, 1 million rubles (105,000 dollars) were allocated from the budget. The reconstructed Memorial of Glory was opened in early August 2010. On 17 August 2010, the Memorial of Glory was subjected to an act of vandalism. A fragment of a sculpture of a Soviet Army soldier in Afghanistan was stolen. In October 2011, the chapel of St. George the Victorious was built and consecrated.

== Tomb of the Unknown Soldier ==
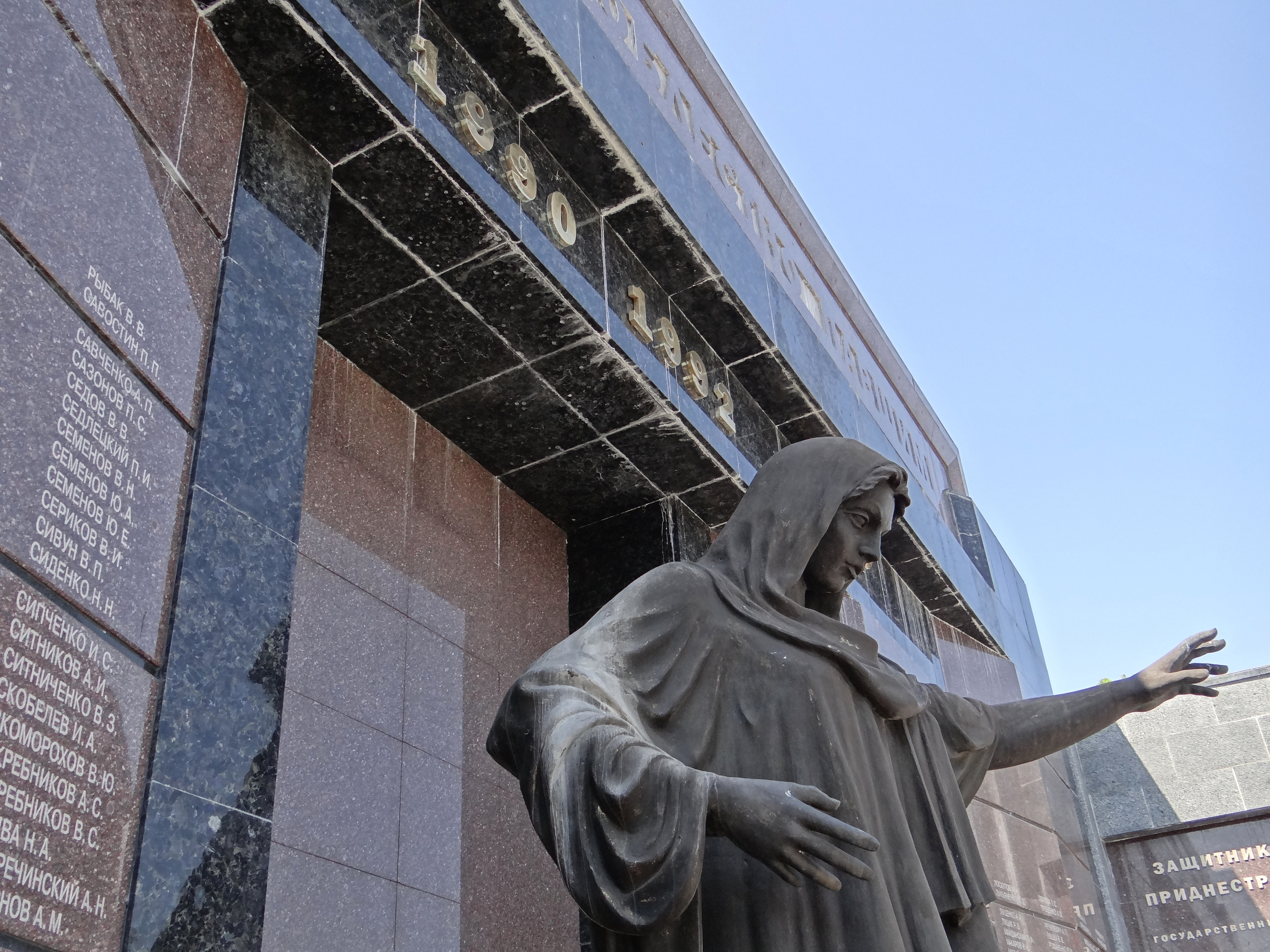
A statue at the tomb.

The Tomb of the Unknown Soldier is the centrepiece of the memorial, flanked by an eternal flame. The eternal flame at the grave of the unknown soldier was lit by Hero of the Soviet Union Mikhail Kharin, a participant of the second Jassy–Kishinev offensive. On 12 April 1972, the 28th anniversary of the Soviet recapture of Tiraspol during World War II, students of the Tiraspol Secondary School No. 6 posted the honorary guard at the eternal flame. It is currently dedicated to the memory of the war dead from the first outbreak of fighting on 3 March 1992.

== Gallery ==
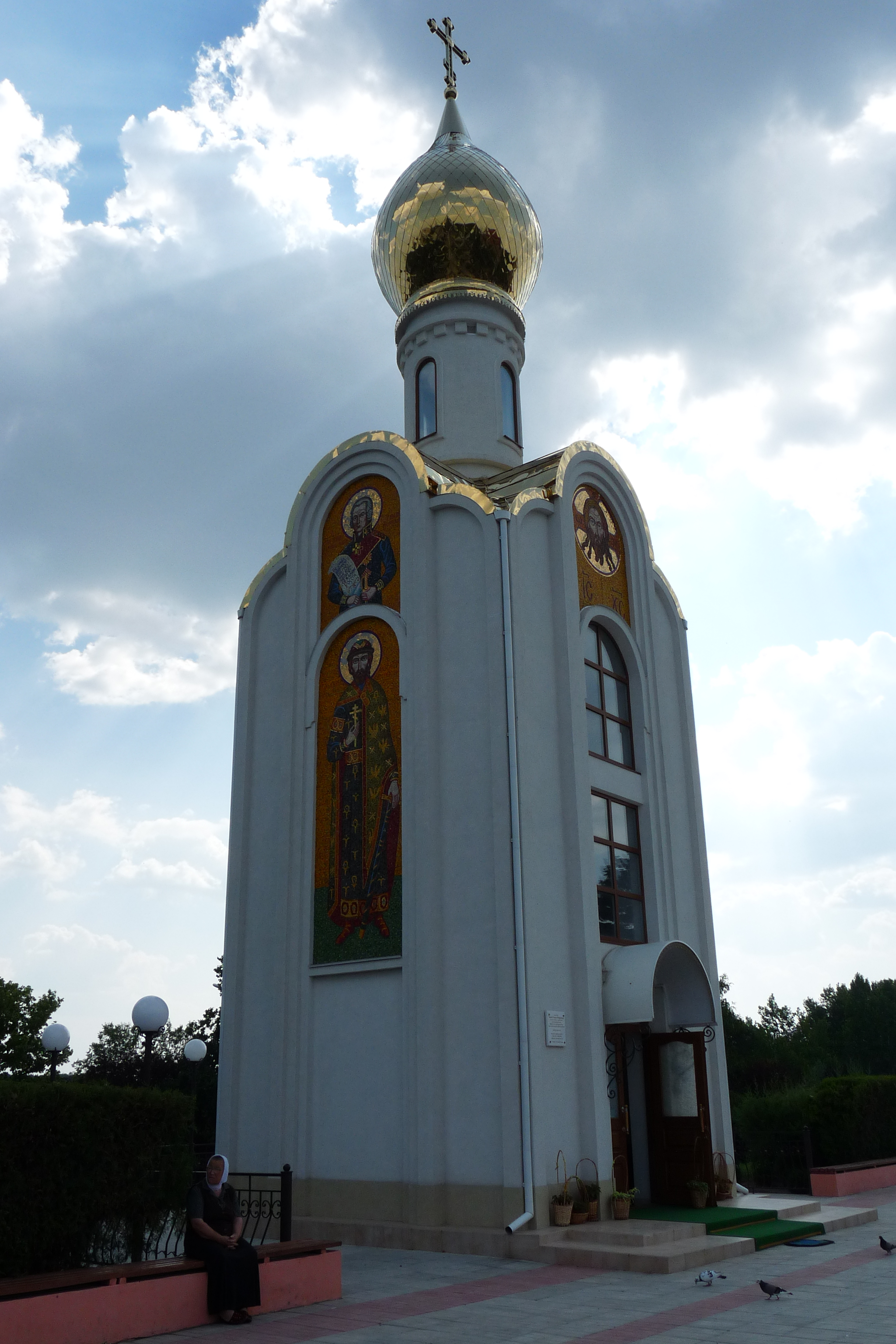
The Chapel of St. George the Victorious

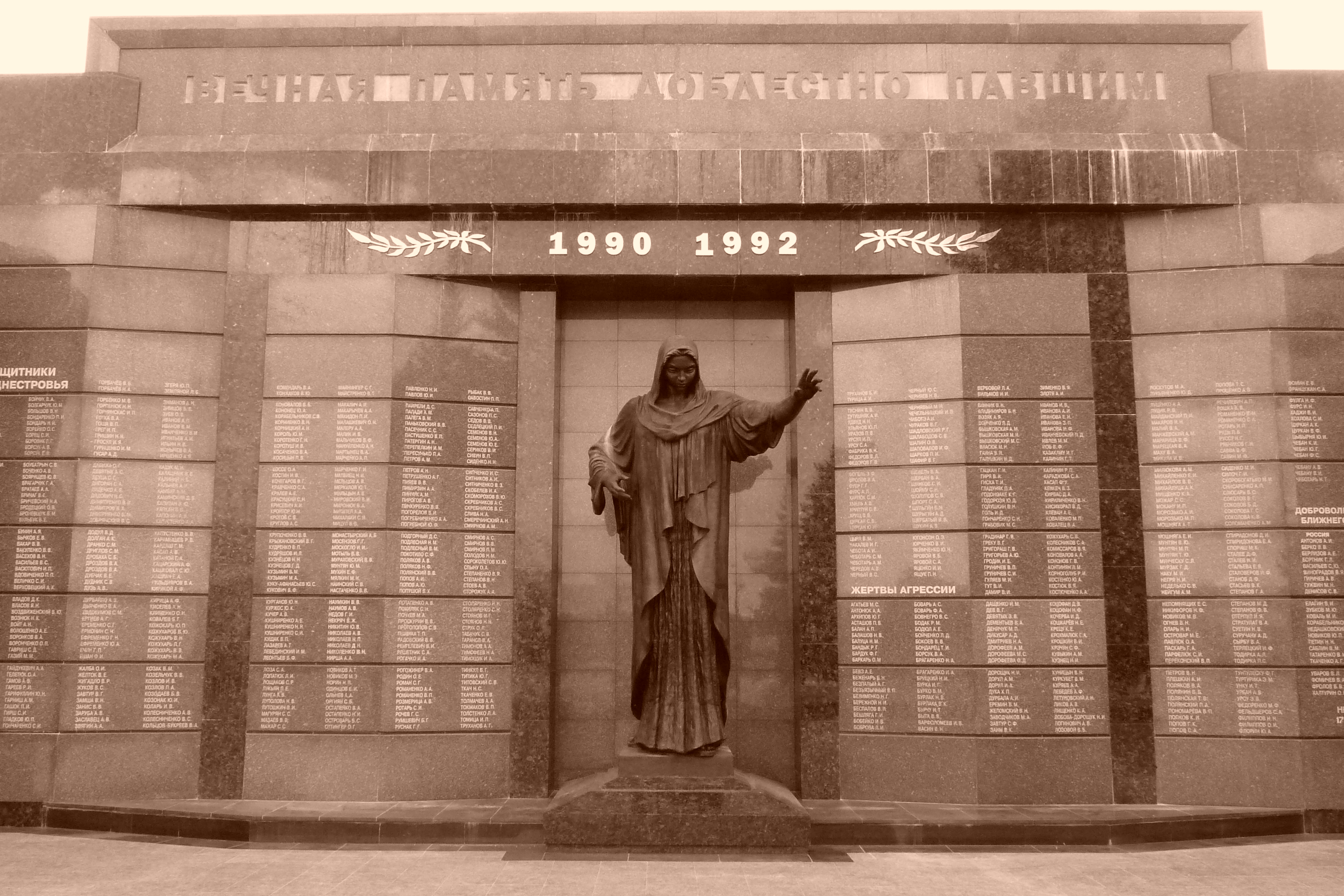
The Glory Memorial

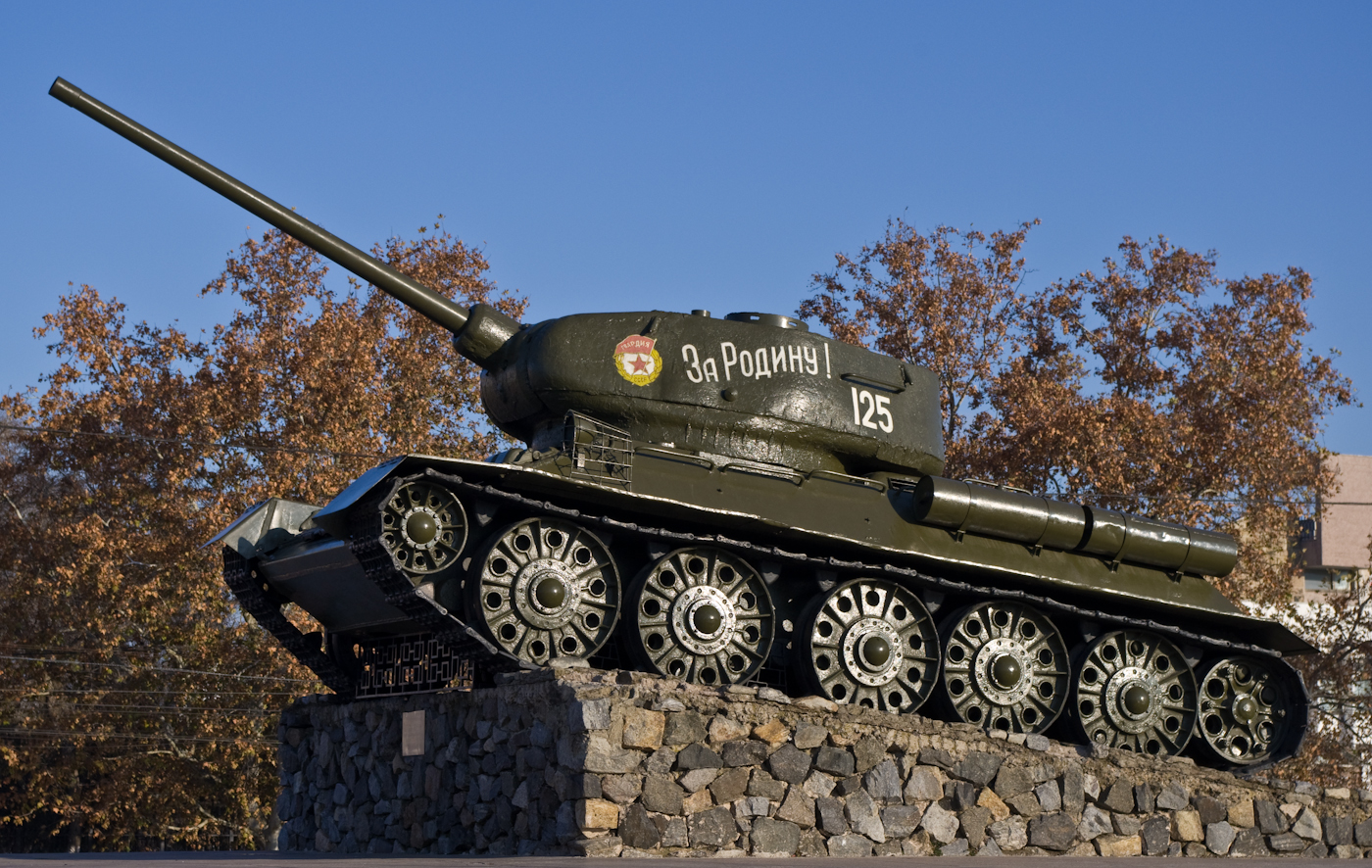
A decommissioned T-34 tank, as part of the Memorial of Glory.

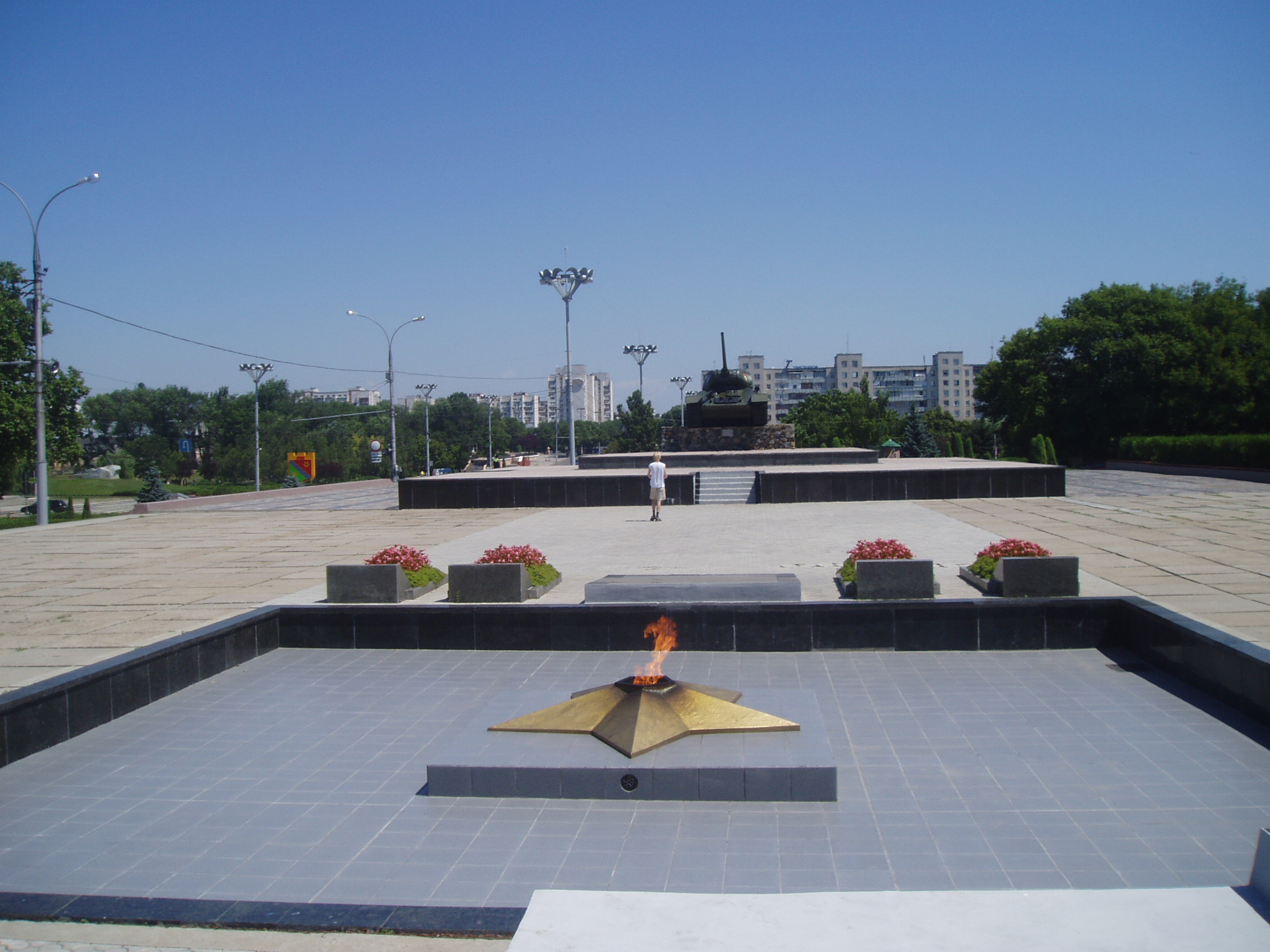
Eternal Flame

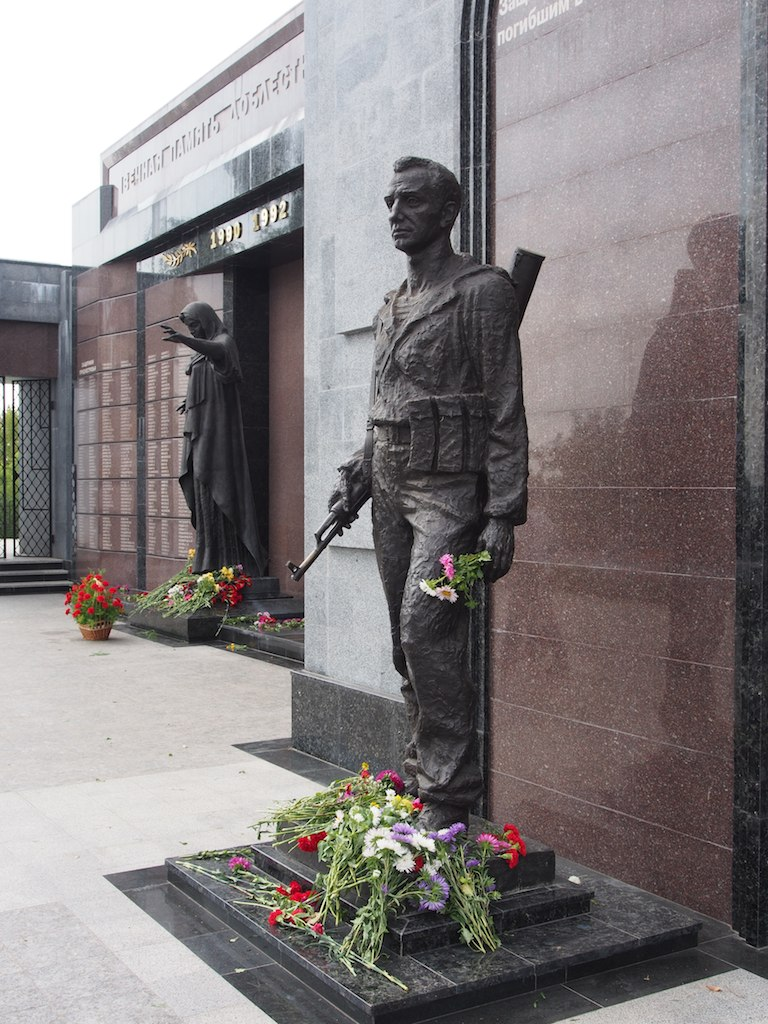
