= Suvorov Square (Tiraspol) =

Main square of Tiraspol in the unrecognised country of Transnistria

Coordinates: 46.8363°N 29.6111°E

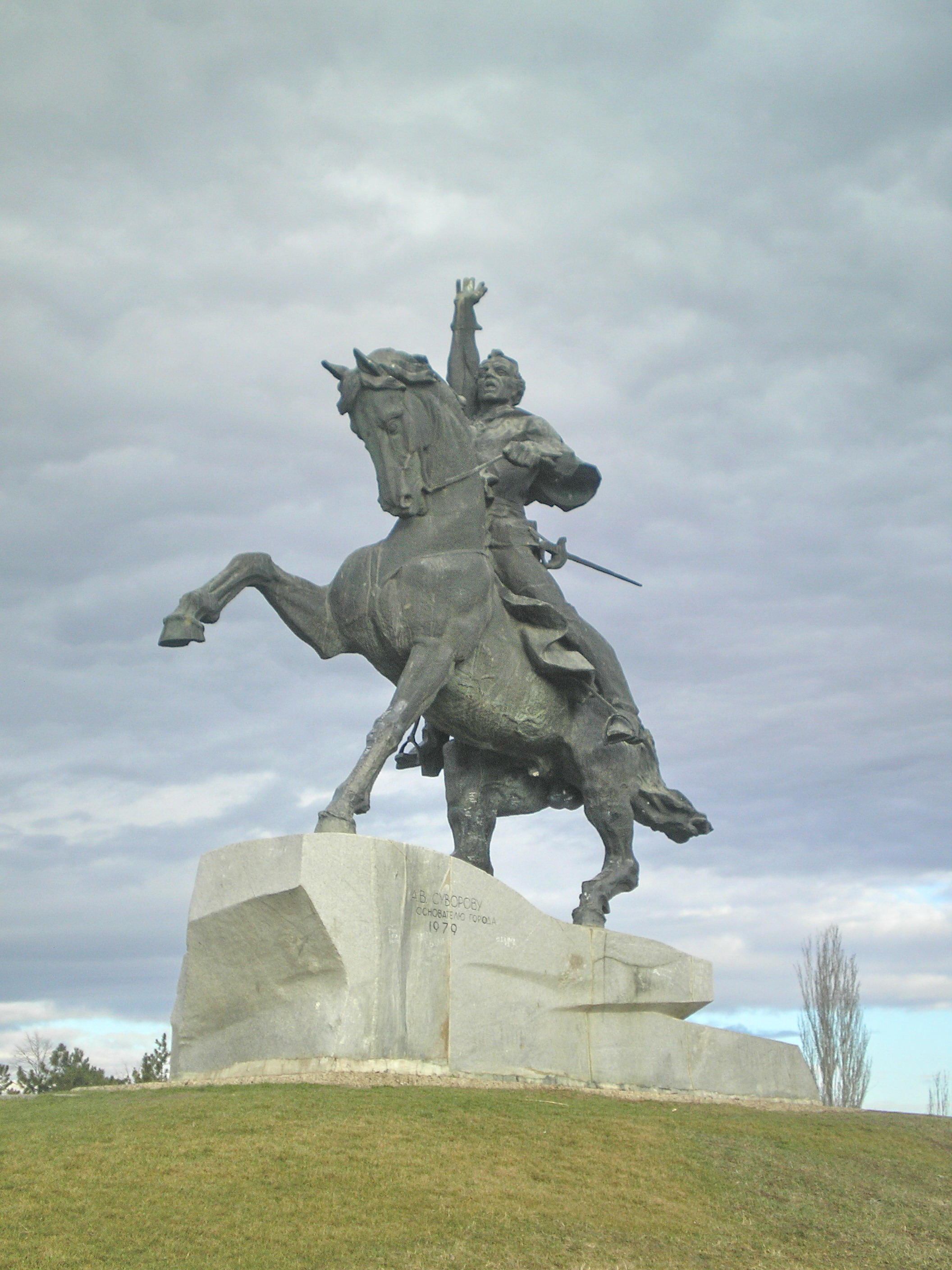
- The Suvorov Monument at the square
- Interactive map of Suvorov Square
- Native name: Площадь Суворова (Russian)
- Former name: Constitution Square
- Type: Square
- Maintained by: City of Tiraspol
- Area: 13,150 square meters
- Location: Tiraspol, Transnistria

Other
- Known for: The Central square of Tiraspol

Suvorov Square (Russian: Площадь Суворова, romanized: Ploshchad' Suvorova; Romanian: Piața Suvorov) is the main square of Tiraspol, the capital city of the unrecognised country of Transnistria. It is located between Red Alley and Shevchenko Street. It is named after the founder of Tiraspol Alexander Suvorov. It is surrounded by the Memorial of Glory, the building of the Supreme Council of Transnistria, the Palace of Children and Teenagers, the Suvorov Monument, and De Volan Square.

== History ==
The square as it is understood was formed at the end of the 18th century, almost immediately after Tiraspol gained the status of a city and a district center. In 1798, in the area of the current City Palace of Culture, a wooden Pokrovskaya single-faith church was built. At the beginning of the 19th century, a stone church was built in a new place (GDK square). In place of the central part of Suvorov Square, a bridge was built across the river that flows into the Dniester. The bridge connected the western and eastern parts of the city and existed until the reconstruction of the center of Tiraspol in the 1970s.

In 1912, at the entrance to the bridge, on the west side, an Arc de Triomphe was installed in honor of the 100th anniversary of the victory in the Patriotic War. A chapel-monument to Tsar Alexander II was erected n Pokrovskaya Square. In Soviet times, Pokrovskaya Square was renamed the Stalin Constitution Square, and later the Square of the Soviet Constitution. Since the 1970s, the square began to take on recognizable features: the majestic Memorial of Glory was built and in 1979 an equestrian monument to Suvorov was erected, which became the symbol of the city. In 1992, in connection with the celebration of the 200th anniversary of Tiraspol and to commemorate the special role commander Alexander Suvorov had in the founding of the city, the square acquired its current name. In the 2000s, the appearance of Suvorov Square was significantly updated. In 2010, the Glory Memorial located in the southwestern part of the square was reconstructed.

On 9 September 2013, Patriarch Kirill of Moscow addressed the people of Transnistria from the square. On 7 November 1967, the day of the golden jubilee anniversary of the October Revolution, a capsule was placed in the rostrum on the main square of the city with a message to descendants, which was supposed to open in 2017. However, the capsule was taken out in 2012 during the reconstruction of the square and stored in the city museum. The tribune itself is the former porch of the Intercession Church, which was destroyed in 1934, and since 1935, mass events have been held on the square. In April 2014, the square underwent reconstruction, it was expanded from Naberezhny Lane to Shevchenko Street.

=== 2008 flood ===
In July–August 2008, Suvorov's area was in a flood zone caused by severe flooding — a rise in the water level in the Dniester River above a critical level. The square named after De Volan, the carriageway adjacent to the square Naberezhny Lane and cafe was flooded. Within three weeks, Suvorov Square was blocked for pedestrians and traffic, becoming the object of increased curiosity of tourists and citizens.

== Notability ==
=== Events ===
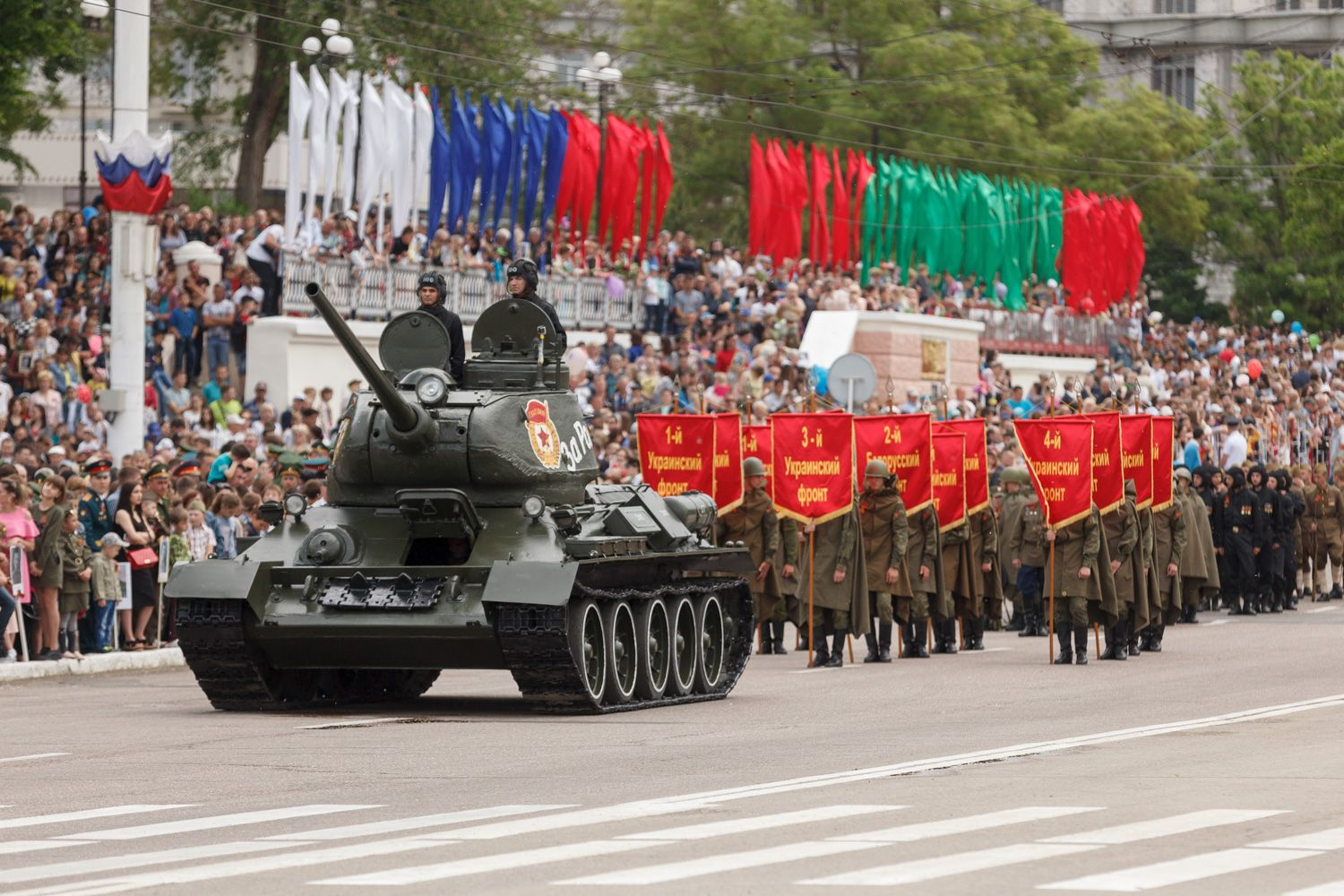
A military parade at the square in 2018

- Parades on the square are held on May 9 and September 2 which celebrates Victory Day and the Independence Day of Transnistria. The first one in the republic's history took place on the third anniversary in 1993. Political rallies, festivals, exhibitions and competitions are also held on the square.

=== Landmarks ===
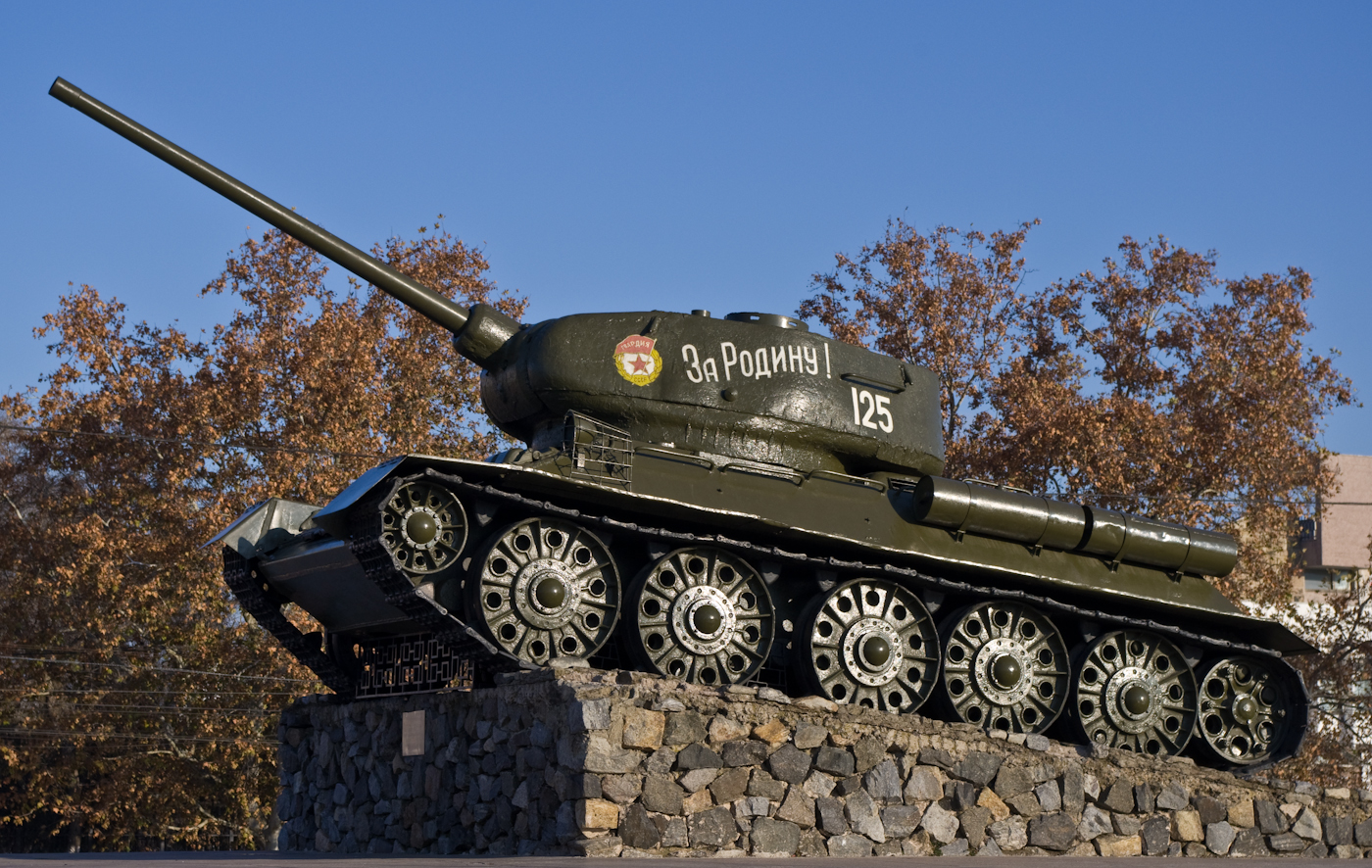
A decommissioned T-34 tank, as part of the Memorial of Glory

- Monument to Alexander Suvorov
- Monument to Franz De Volan
- Monument to Catherine II the Great
- Monument to Valentina Solovyova
- Monument to Viktor Sinev
- Memorial of Glory
- Palace of Pioneers in the former USSR (now the Palace of Children youthful creativity)
- Tiraspol Cinema and Concert Complex

== Gallery ==
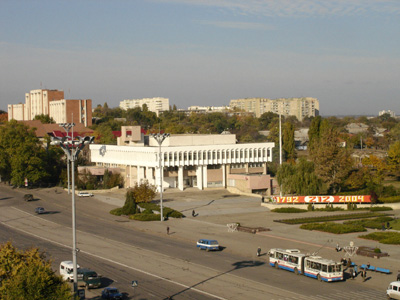

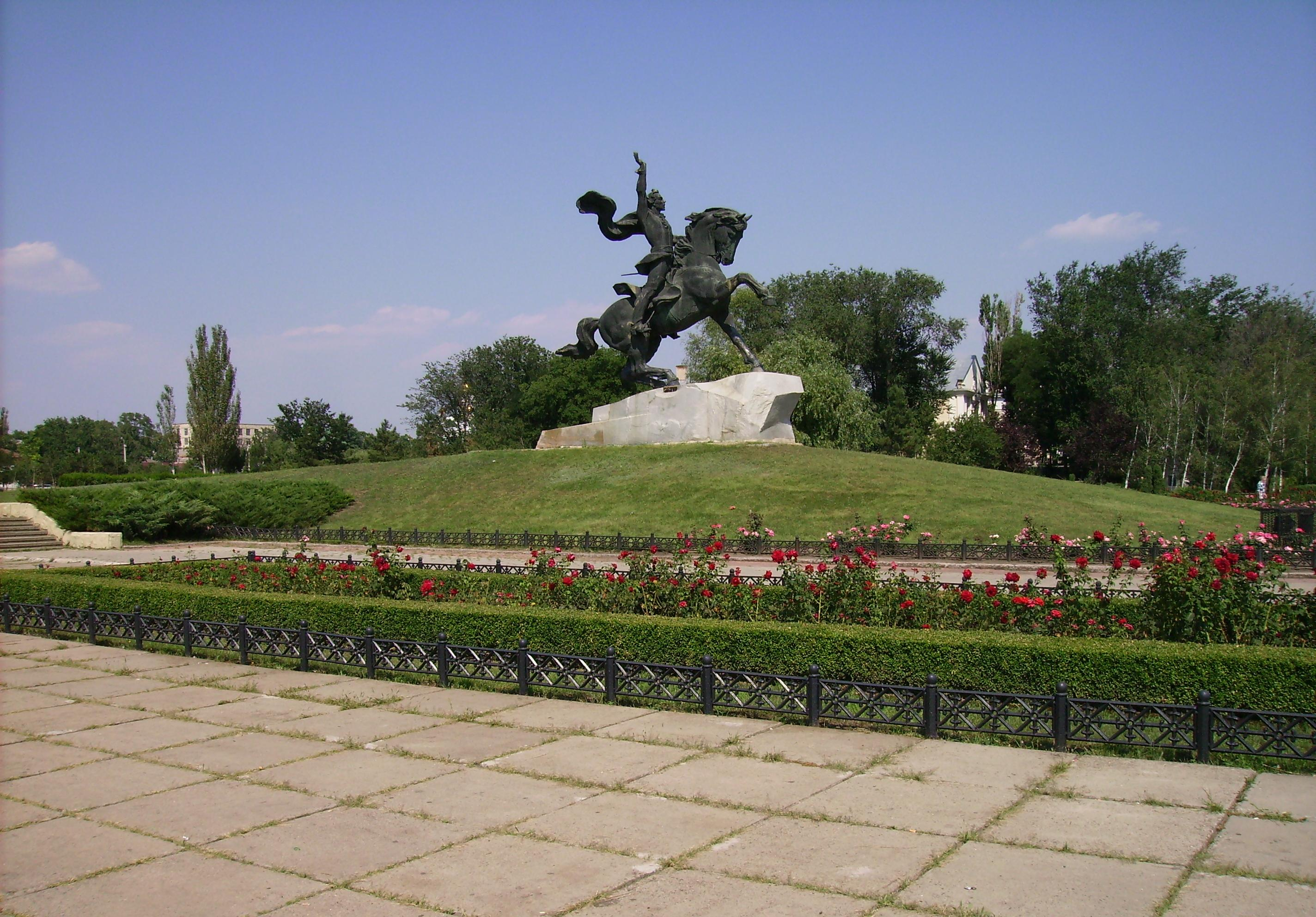
The monument to Suuvorov.

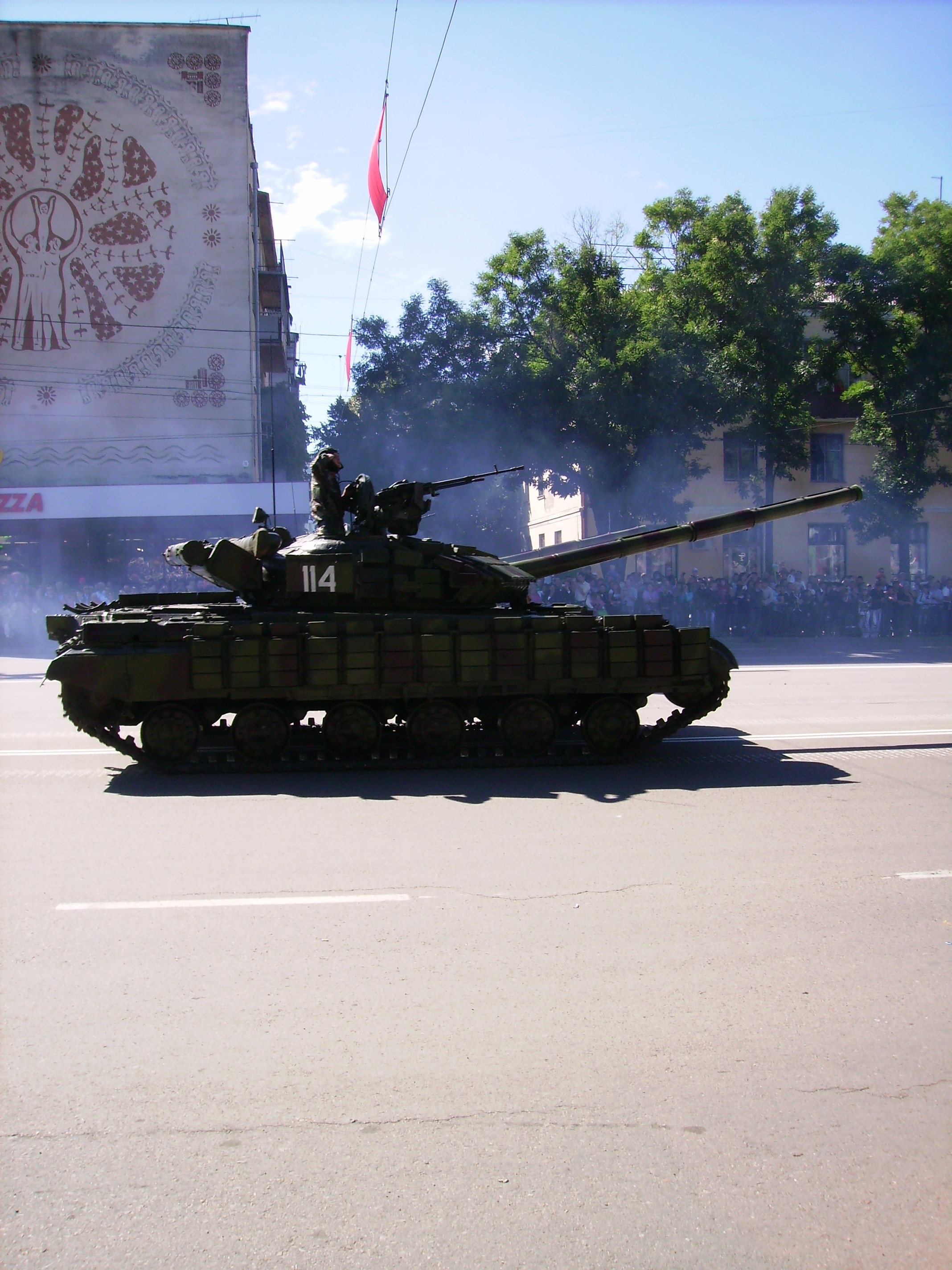
A tank on the square during a parade in 2010.

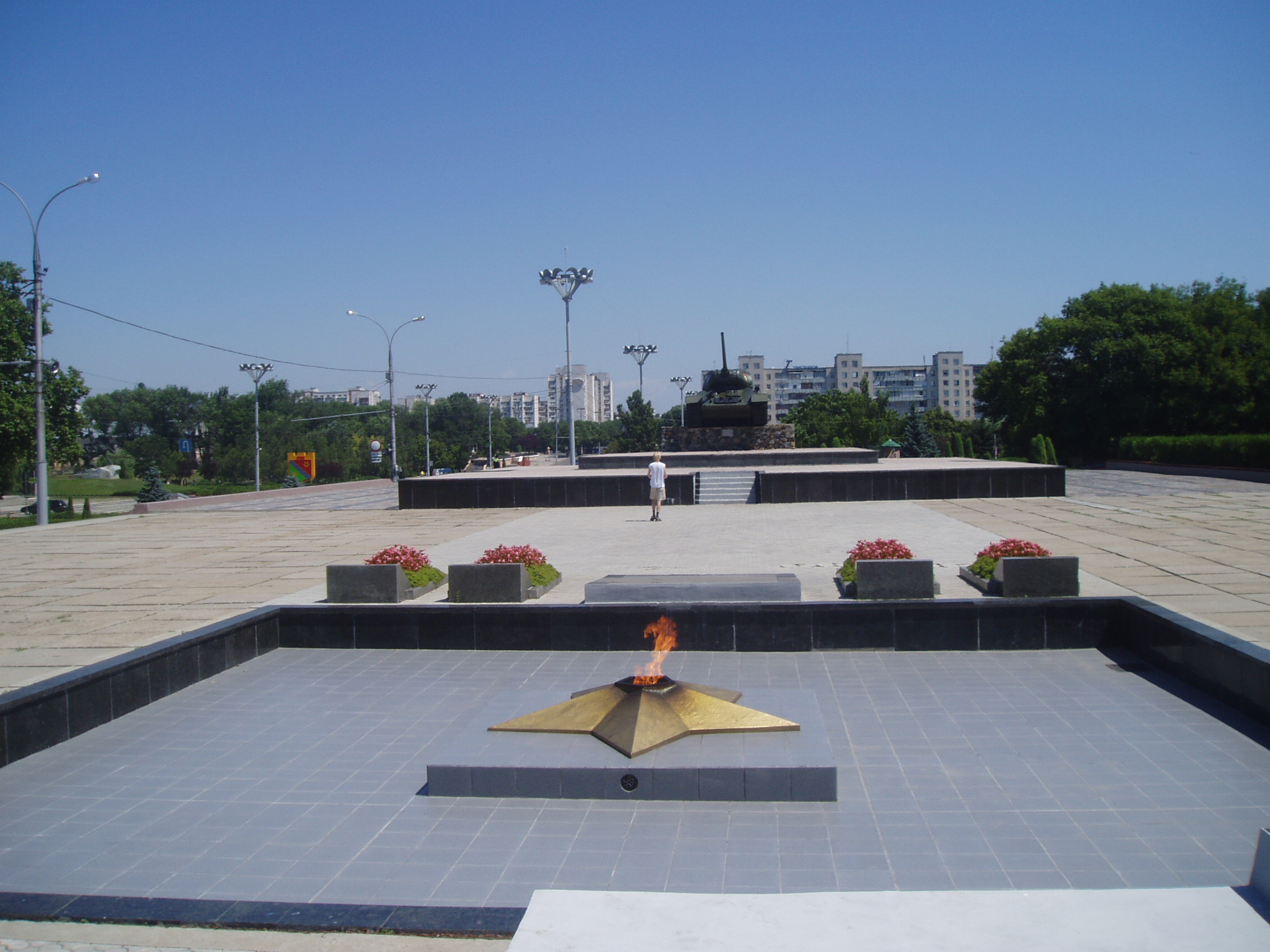
The Eternal Flame on the square.

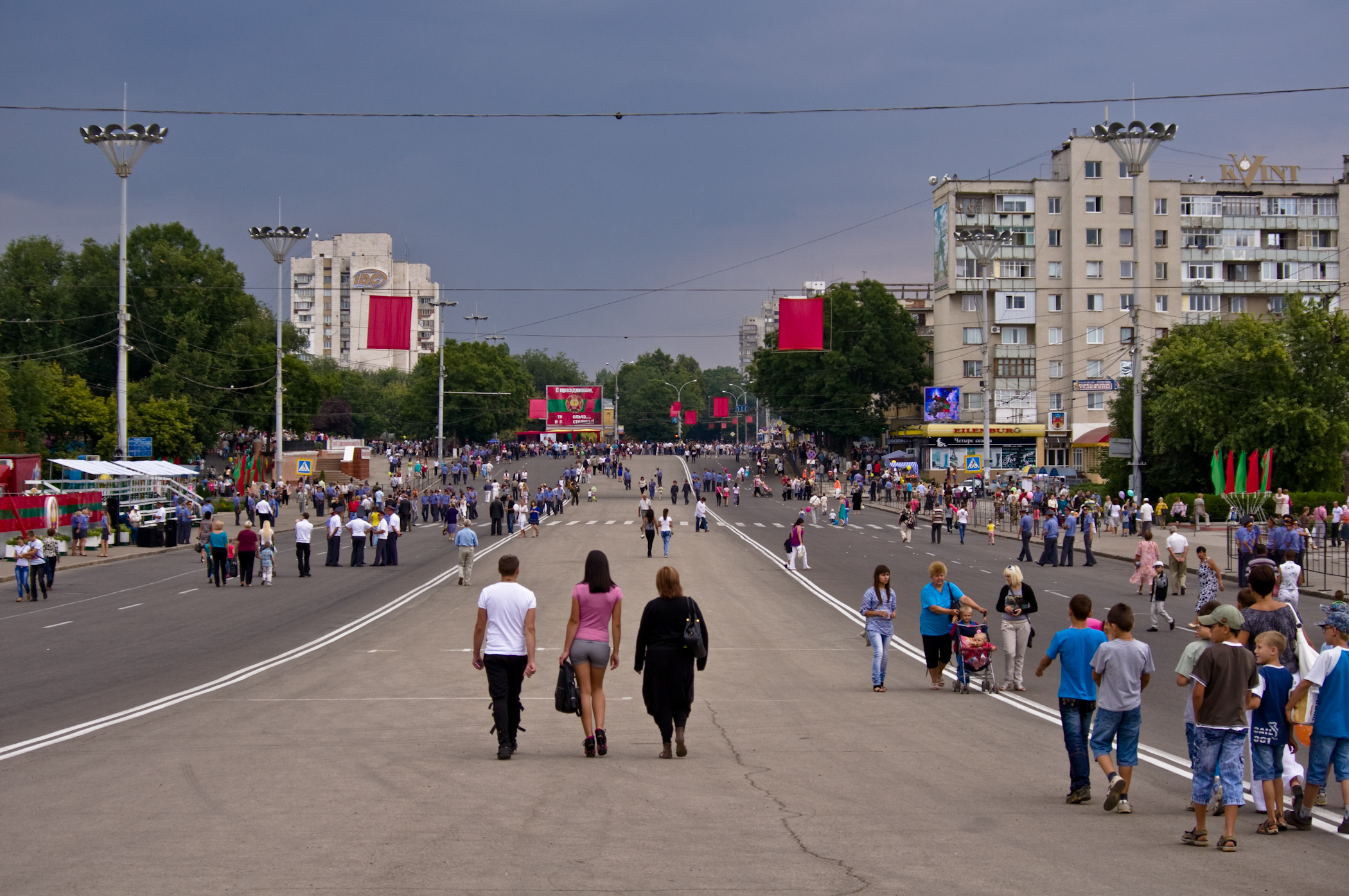

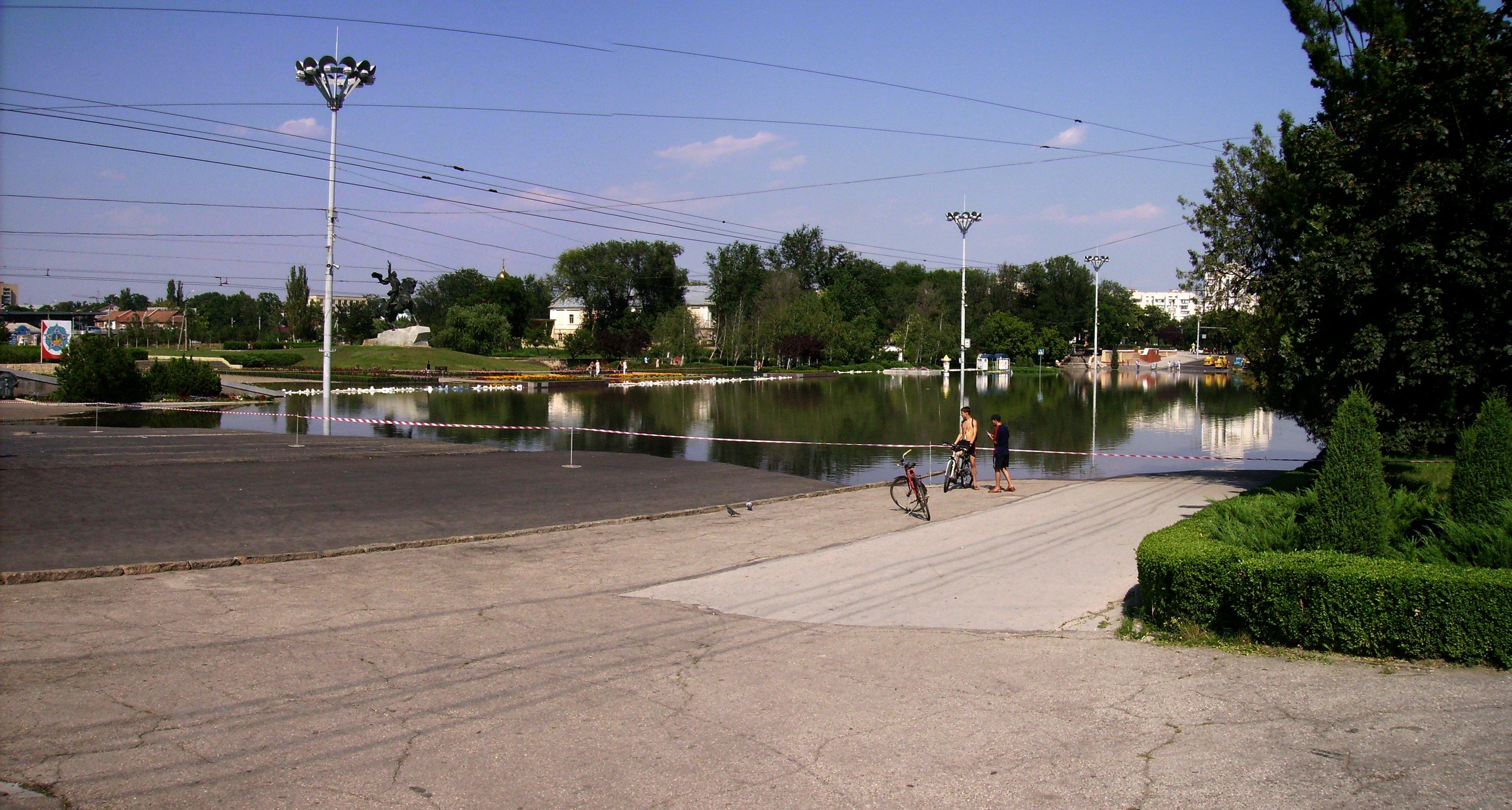
The square during the flood of 2008.

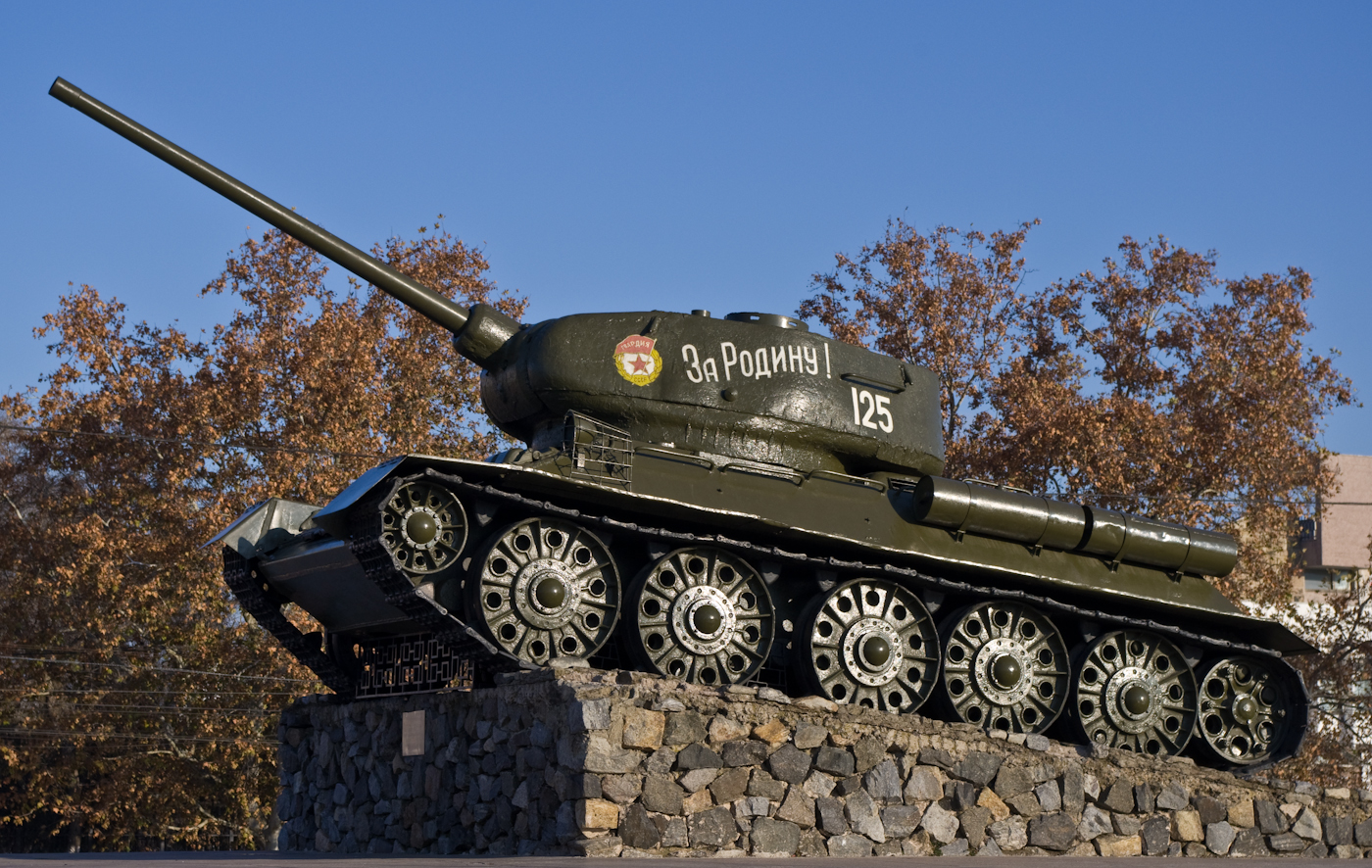
A T-34 Tank at the Memorial of Glory.

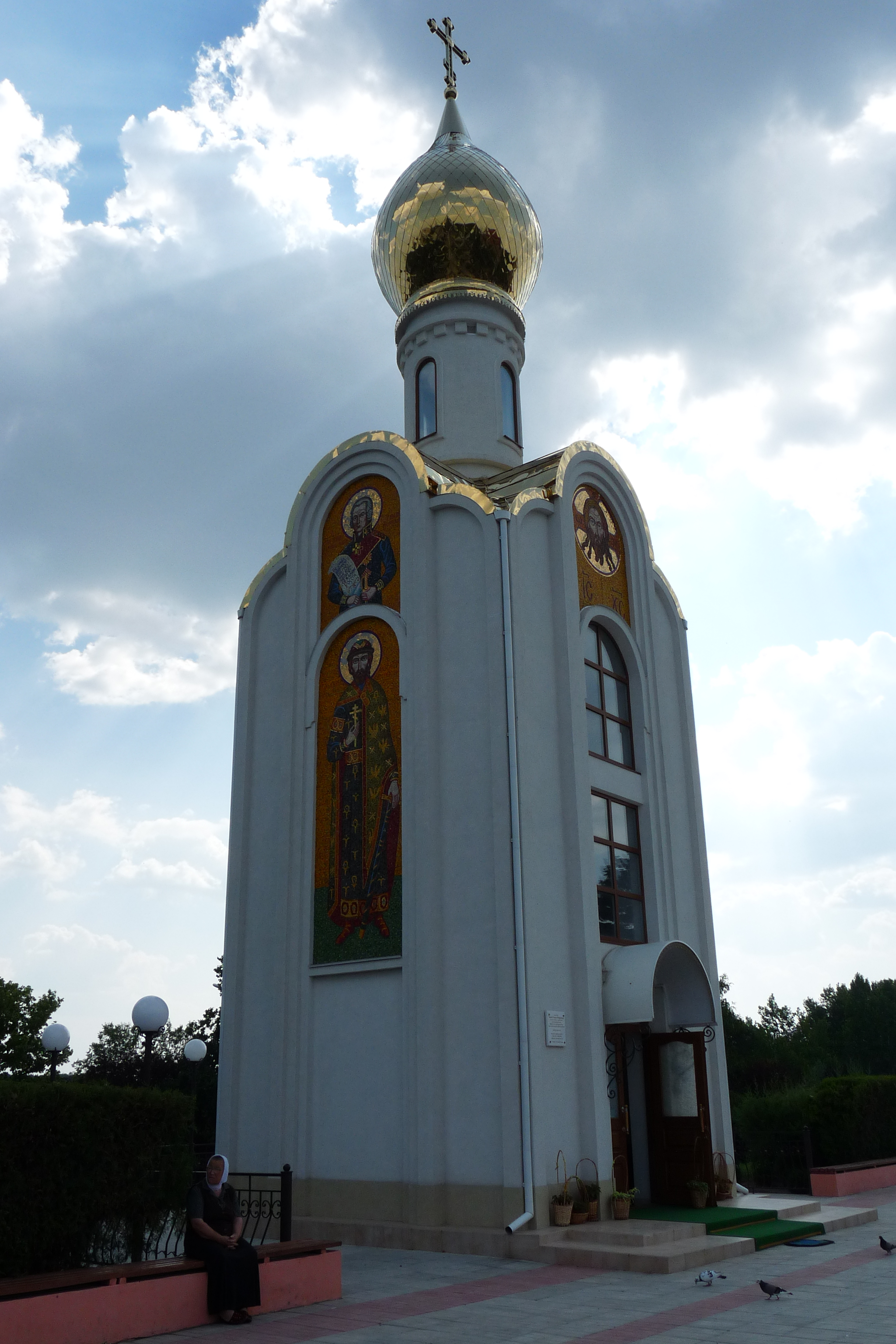
The Chapel of St. George the Victorious

== See also ==
- Tiraspol
- Alexander Suvorov
