= Garry Faif =

Soviet and French architect

Garry Semenovich Faif (Russian: Гарри Семёнович Файф; 12 June 1942 in Tbilisi – 12 April 2002 in Paris) was a Soviet and French architect, sculptor and engineer, one of the founders of Russian Kineticism. Born in Tbilisi, where his parents had fled from Moldova, during his childhood the family returned to Tiraspol, where Faif received his secondary education and graduated from the art studio under the direction of Alexander Foinitsky. He entered the Moscow Architectural Institute, where he graduated in 1962. Together with Leonid Fishbein (1909-2010) he was the author of the monument to the soldiers and airmen in Tiraspol and the Glory Memorial on the banks of the Dniester, inaugurated on 23 February 1972.

In 1973 he was deported and moved to France, where he received a second architectural education. He studied with renowned architects Ricardo Bofill and Paul Chemetov. He established his own architectural firm, which built more than thirty municipal buildings in Paris, France, and the surrounding areas, and participated in art exhibitions around the world, from Japan to America.

== Literature ==
- Berkovich, Gary. Reclaiming a History. Jewish Architects in Imperial Russia and the USSR. Volume 4. Modernized Socialist Realism: 1955–1991. Weimar und Rostock: Grunberg Verlag. 2022. P. 114. ISBN 978-3-933713-65-0.
