= Fjärdsjömåla =

- Village
- Location in Blekinge County
- Coordinates: 56°20′N 15°44′E
- Country: Sweden
- County: Blekinge County
- Municipality: Karlskrona Municipality
- Time zone: UTC+1 (CET)
  - Summer (DST): UTC+2 (CEST)

Fjärdsjömåla is a village in Karlskrona Municipality, Blekinge County, southeastern Sweden. According to the 2005 census, it had a population of 56 people.
