= Opinion polling for the 2021 Moldovan parliamentary election =

This page lists public opinion polls conducted for the 2021 Moldovan parliamentary election.

== Party vote ==
The table below lists nationwide voting intention estimates. Refusals are generally excluded from the party vote percentages, while question wording and the treatment of "don't know" responses and those not intending to vote may vary between polling organisations. When available, seat projections are displayed below the percentages in a smaller font. 51 seats are required for an absolute majority in the Parliament.

PSRM BECS ACUM PAS PPPDA PDM ȘOR PCRM PN

(excluding Transnistria and diaspora voters) Exit poll

Polling firm/Commissioner	Fieldwork date	Sample size	Electoral Bloc of Communists and Socialists		NOW Platform DA and PAS		PDM	ȘOR	Electoral Bloc "Renato Usatîi"	Others	Lead	Gov't seats
Polling firm/Commissioner	Fieldwork date	Sample size	Party of Socialists of the Republic of Moldova	Party of Communists of the Republic of Moldova	Party of Action and Solidarity	Dignity and Truth Platform Party	PDM	ȘOR	Our Party	Others	Lead	Gov't seats
2021 parliamentary election	11 Jul 2021	1,467,205	27.2; 32		52.8; 63	2.3; 0	1.8; 0	5.7; 6	4.1; 0	5.5; 0	25.6; 31	–
CBS-AXA / IPN-EEfD 22:00 UTC+3	11 Jul 2020	3,337	23.1		55.8	1.9	1.1	8.1	4.5	5.5	32.7	—
CBS-AXA / IPN-EEfD 21:00 UTC+3	11 Jul 2020	2,764	24.0		55.1	1.8	1.1	8.1	4.4	5.4	31.1	—
ASDM	21 Jun–2 Jul 2021	1,181	37.1		37.4	5.4	1.3	6.8	5.5	5.5	0.3	—
BOP	12–27 Jun 2021	1,161	32.5; 34		43.5; 55	3.5; 0	1.7; 0	7.8; 12	5.9; 0	3.2; 0	11.0; 0	46
CBS-AXA / IPN-EEfD	20–30 June 2021	1,201	30.5		50.9	2.5	1.0	4.7	5.2	5.2	20.5	—
ASDM	10–20 Jun 2021	1,167	36.7		38.5	4.4	1.4	6.9	5.2	6.9	1.8	—
CBS-AXA / IPN-EEfD	12–19 June 2021	1,104	28.0		49.8	1.9	1.0	4.7	6.3	10.2	21.2	—
CBS-AXA / IPN-EEfD	2–8 Jun 2021	1,154	32.5		50.5	2.0	0.8	5.1	5.0	4.1	18.0	—
ASDM	24 May–5 Jun 2021	1,179	36.1		36.5	4.4	2.2	7.3	4.8	8.5	0.4	—
RDI	21–28 May 2021	1,206	35.4		37.6	3.8	2.3	8.7	4.2	5.4	2.2	—
iData	19–28 May 2021	1,227	33.4		39.1	3.5	1.2	10.1	4.9	7.8 (Note: AUR 4.8%)	5.7	—
ASDM	14–22 May 2021	1,185	35.8		37.0	3.3	2.5	7.6	4.4	9.3	1.2	—
	13 May 2021	PSRM and PCRM form an electoral alliance.										
	28 Apr 2021	President Maia Sandu dissolves parliament and calls early election.										
ASDM	8–20 Apr 2021	1,187	37.6; 44	1.8; 0	39.7; 46	3.2; 0	—	10.0; 11	3.7; 0	3.9; 0	2.1	55
iData	20–31 Mar 2021	1,314	33.9	2.2	41.3	4.3	1.2	9.2	4.9	3.0	7.4	—
IMAS	9–23 Mar 2021	1,115	32.7	4.8	42.5	2.0	2.7	7.1	4.3	3.9	9.8	—
IRI	9 Feb–16 Mar 2021	2,001	24	4	42	6	3	6	8	6	18	—
iData	19–27 Feb 2021	1,252	32.7; 36	1.4; 0	43.1; 48	5.2; 6	0.7; 0	10.0; 11	3.3; 0	3.7; 0	10.4; 12	47
ASDM	12–20 Feb 2021	1,191	32.7	3.9	36.0	4.2	2.4	9.7	7.4	3.5	3.3	—
Intellect	9–16 Feb 2021	1,103	31.8; 35	2.5; 0	35.4; 39	3.4; 0	5.4; 6	8.9; 10	9.9; 11	2.7; 0	3.6; 4	45
BOP	28 Jan–14 Feb 2021	1,108	26.6	3.3	48.6	2.8	0.8	8.7	6.2	3.0	22.0	—
iData	15–31 Jan 2021	1,264	32.8; 38	3.3; 0	38.0; 44	4.9; 0	0.9; 0	10.8; 13	5.0; 6	4.3; 0	5.2; 6	51
ASDM	8–23 Jan 2021	1,153	33.2	2.9	33.9	4.4	1.1	12.9	7.5	4.0	0.7	—
iData	11–14 Dec 2020	1,043	32.8; 36	3.2; 0	37.4; 41	2.0; 0	0.5; 0	13.3; 15	8.0; 9	2.7; 0	4.6; 5	51
	15 Nov 2020	PAS candidate Maia Sandu won the presidential election.										
	7 Nov 2020	PDM left the coalition. ȘOR starts to support the government.										
iData	4–7 Nov 2020	1,070	35.7; 40	1.7; 0	32.1; 36	2.0; 0	1.9; 0	10.0; 11	12.2; 14	4.4; 0	3.6; 4	40
ASDM	2–7 Nov 2020	1,177	41.5	2.2	23.1	6.0	3.3	10.7	10.4	2.7	18.4	—
2020 Presidential election (Round 1)	1 Nov 2020	1,348,707	32.6	—	36.2	3.3	—	6.5	16.9	4.6	3.6	—
FOP	17–24 Oct 2020	2,171	41.7	0.3	33.0	7.3	0.6	5.5	9.3	2.3	8.7	—
iData	14–24 Oct 2020	1,231	34.8; 40	1.9; 0	27.9; 32	4.6; 0	1.5; 0	12.7; 15	12.6; 14	3.9; 0	6.9; 8	40
ASDM	11–20 Oct 2020	1,183	40.9	2.0	22.8	6.8	3.1	11.3	10.2	2.8	18.1	—
BOP	8–20 Oct 2020	1,200	35.0	1.3	29.6	2.7	1.0	9.7	16.1	4.7	5.4	—
CBS-AXA	10–17 Oct 2020	1,001	34.0	1.8	31.2	2.6	1.7	6.3	10.3	12.0	2.8	—
Intellect	2–9 Oct 2020	1,453	39.9; 44	2.7; 0	24.5; 27	5.3; 6	3.3; 0	11.9; 13	9.9; 11	2.5; 0	15.4; 17	44
ASDM	26 Sep–8 Oct 2020	1,167	39.7	2.3	22.3	6.1	3.8	10.8	10.4	4.3	17.4	—
iData	30 Sep–5 Oct 2020	1,218	35.2; 41	1.9; 0	28.2; 33	4.8; 0	2.8; 0	11.8; 14	11.6; 13	3.7; 0	7.0; 8	41
ASDM	6–22 Sep 2020	1,189	37.6	3.0	22.5	7.7	4.7	10.4	10.0	4.1	15.1	—
Intellect	24 Aug–2 Sep 2020	1,213	35.5; 44	4.8; 0	24.0; 29	2.5; 0	2.1; 0	13.0; 15	11.0; 13	7.1; 0	11.5; 15	44
iData	25–27 Aug 2020	1,177	37.1; 45	4.8; 0	26.3; 32	4.7; 0	2.1; 0	10.3; 12	9.8; 12	5.1; 0	10.8; 13	45
IRI	16 Jul–23 Aug 2020	2,017	29	5	28	5	5	10	7	10	1	—
ASDM	5–20 Aug 2020	1,191	39.3	4.3	26.8	4.9	5.2	8.4	6.9	4.0	12.5	—
Intellect	23–27 Jul 2020	1,072	30.4; 37	7.2; 9	22.6; 27	4.4; 0	3.9; 0	13.4; 16	10.1; 12	8.1; 0	7.8; 10	37
iData	23–26 Jul 2020	1,214	36.9; 43	2.7; 0	30.5; 36	5.4; 6	5.3; 6	8.5; 10	4.8; 0	5.9; 0	6.4; 7	49
ASDM	14–24 Jul 2020	921	43.5	3.6	27.9	4.2	5.0	6.5	5.6	3.7	15.6	—
Intellect	2–9 Jul 2020	1,172	33.9; 36	7.1; 7	27.8; 29	5.5; 6	3.6; 0	11.0; 12	10.1; 11	1.2; 0	6.0; 7	36
iData	20 Jun–4 Jul 2020	1,511	35.3	2.2	30.4	8.3	3.8	9.3	5.8	4.8	4.9	—
ASDM	20–27 Jun 2020	1,127	48.7	2.0	26.9	7.0	3.9	2.3	6.1	1.8	21.8	—
IMAS	14–27 Jun 2020	1,105	35.7	5.6	25.6	3.6	4.7	11.6	7.7	5.5	10.1	—
BOP	13–23 Jun 2020	1,200	34.0	4.9	33.9	3.8	5.2	7.4	5.4	5.4	0.1	—
FOP	23–31 May 2020	1,767	46.3; 55	1.7; 0	30.9; 37	7.5; 9	3.0; 0	3.1; 0	4.6; 0	2.7; 0	15.4; 18	55
CBS-AXA	5–11 May 2020	1,003	29.8	5.3	29.1	6.1	11.4	2.9	6.1	9.2	0.7	—
ASDM	1–7 May 2020	1,141	48.6	2.6	21.9	7.4	8.7	2.1	4.4	1.7	26.7	—
iData	26 Apr–4 May 2020	931	48.1	3.3	22.7	6.8	8.2	3.7	6.8	6.2	25.4	—
CBS-AXA	31 Mar–12 Apr 2020	1,004	41.6; 52	6.8; 6	21.2; 26	5.0; 6	7.8; 10	4.5; 0	2.8; 0	9.6; 0	25.4; 26	62
iData	30 Mar–4 Apr 2020	1010	50.3	3.9	21.3	9.3	8.7	1.8	2.1	2.5	29.0	—
iData	13–15 Mar 2020	326	43.9	7.2	27.6	10.0	4.1	3.3	1.2	2.7	16.3	—
FOP	22 Feb–7 Mar 2020	1,798	47.6	2.0	28.7	6.3	4.7	3.9	3.4	3.4	19.9	—
IMAS	7–19 Feb 2020	905	42.1	5.4	27.9	2.0	9.3	6.0	2.7	4.2	14.2	—
ASDM	10–16 Feb 2020	1,173	45.1	4.7	19.7	5.6	11.8	4.2	3.7	2.0	25.4	—
Intellect	16–23 Jan 2020	1,134	40.6; 51	3.4; 0	27.9; 36	4.1; 0	10.7; 11	4.8; 0	3.5; 0	5.0; 0	8.6; 15	62
ASDM	2–13 Jan 2020	1,189	44.0	5.8	21.4	6.3	10.0	4.8	3.0	4.7	22.6	—
BOP	7–23 Dec 2019	1,187	40.3	4.2	25.5	4.8	10.8	4.2	3.6	7.3	14.8	—
IMAS	2–14 Dec 2019	1,090	38.3	6.0	27.0	2.0	13.5	5.0	4.5	3.6	11.3	—
IRI	16 Nov–8 Dec 2019	1,204	38	4	27	4	13	5	4	5	11	—
FOP	23–30 Nov 2019	1,201	48.0	2.6	30.0	6.4	7.0	1.9	3.0	1.1	18.0	—
	14 Nov 2019	Chicu Cabinet is formed by PSRM and PDM.										
2019 local elections (Round 1)	20 Oct 2019	1,173,834	27.1	3.8	23.5		16.5	6.5	4.5	—	3.6	—
IMAS	7–22 Sep 2019	1,500	43.7	4.9	25.1	4.3	11.4	5.3	—	5.3	18.6	—
ASDM	11–20 Sep 2019	1,189	42.9	3.6	22.6	10.0	9.4	3.0	4.5	—	20.3	—
CBS-AXA	2–14 Aug 2019	1,106	41.9; 50	3.7; 0	27.3; 33	8.7; 10	6.7; 8	4.6; 0	3.0; 0	4.3; 0	14.6; 17	93
iData	17–28 Jul 2019	1,825	41.9; 48	3.4; 0	29.3; 34	8.2; 10	8.1; 9	3.0; 0	1.6; 0	4.5; 0	12.6; 14	92
ASDM	11–22 Jun 2019	1,191	44.7	3.3	34.1		7.6	5.0	2.3	1.0	10.6	—
iData	12–13 Jun 2019	720	39.8	2.8	32.7 (Note: 21.8 for PAS, 8.2 for PPDA, and 2.7 for ACUM.)		11.3	6.3	1.7	5.4	7.1	—
	8 Jun 2019	Sandu Cabinet is formed by PSRM and ACUM.										
	7–15 Jun 2019	2019 Moldovan constitutional crisis										
ASDM	1–10 May 2019	1,189	38.4	3.1	23.5		23.8	5.8	1.8	1.1	14.6	–
IMAS	17 Mar–5 Apr 2019	1,110	34.8	2.7	27.1		26.8	6.1	1.3	1.3	7.7	–
2019 parliamentary election	24 Feb 2019	1,416,359	31.2; 35	3.8; 0	26.9; 26		23.6; 30	8.3; 7	3.0; 0	3.4; 0	4.3; 5	–
