= 2021 Moldovan parliamentary election =

- 11 July 2021
- All 101 seats in Parliament; 51 seats needed for a majority
- Turnout: 48.41% (▼0.83pp)
Party	Leader	Vote %	Seats	+/–
PAS	Igor Grosu	52.80	63	+48
BECS	Vladimir Voronin	27.17	32	−3
ȘOR	Ilan Shor	5.74	6	−1
This lists parties that won seats. See the complete results below.
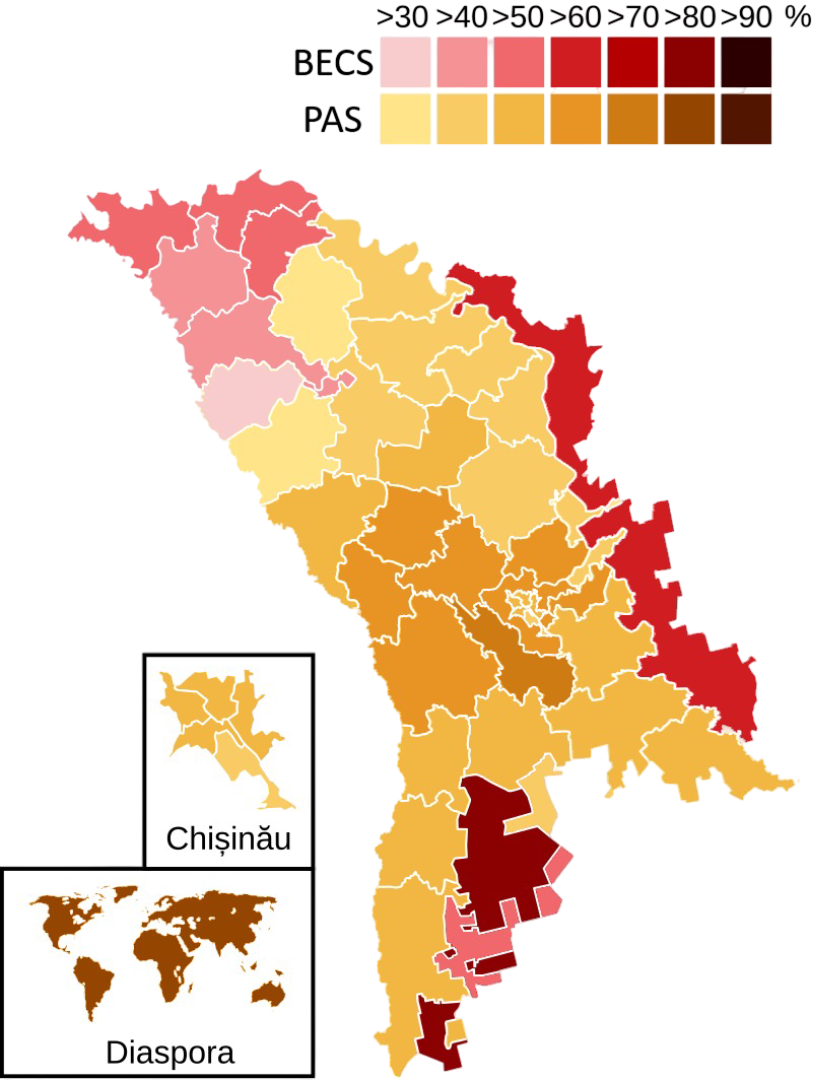
Results by district
Prime Minister before	Prime Minister after
Aureliu Ciocoi (acting); Independent	Natalia Gavrilița; PAS
Cabinet before	Cabinet after
Chicu Cabinet; PSRM–PDM	Gavrilița Cabinet; PAS

Snap parliamentary elections were held in Moldova on 11 July 2021. Following the resignation of Ion Chicu, the position of Prime Minister became vacant, with the Parliament being obligated to form a new government within three months. After the expiration of the constitutionally mandated period and two failed attempts to win parliamentary approval for the proposed cabinets, the Constitutional Court ruled on 15 April that the circumstances justifying a dissolution of the parliament were met. President Maia Sandu signed the decree dissolving the Parliament on 28 April and snap parliamentary elections were called on.

The Party of Action and Solidarity (PAS) received 52.80% of the vote and won 63 seats, obtaining a majority in the 101-seat parliament. The alliance Electoral Bloc of Communists and Socialists (BECS) received 27.17% of the vote and won 32 seats, while the Șor Party received 5.74% of the votes and won six seats. No other party or alliance reached the electoral threshold required to win a seat.

The Constitutional Court of Moldova recognized the election results on 23 July.

The Organization for Security and Co-operation in Europe (OSCE) assessed the elections as being competitive and well-run despite the inadequate handling of election disputes and campaign finance issues. The Commonwealth of Independent States (CIS) noted that the procedure was held in line with the requirements of the Electoral Code. The CIS observers did not report any violations that could influence the results of the elections.

== Background ==
The Constitution of Moldova mandates that a government must be formed within three months of official results of parliamentary elections being proclaimed by the Constitutional Court. The results of the 24 February 2019 elections were confirmed on 9 March. On 8 June a coalition government led by Maia Sandu was formed by the Party of Socialists (PSRM) and the ACUM alliance. However, the Democratic Party (PDM) petitioned the Constitutional Court, claiming that the government had not been formed in time. The Court interpreted the three-month deadline as 90 days, which meant the deadline had been 7 June, and concluded that snap elections should be held. The following day the Court suspended President Igor Dodon (a former PSRM leader) from exercising his presidential powers and duties for failing to dissolve parliament, and appointed former prime minister Pavel Filip of the PDM as acting president. Filip subsequently issued a decree calling for early elections for 6 September.

Dodon and the PSRM–ACUM coalition called the process illegal. The governments of Russia, France, Germany, Poland, Sweden and the United Kingdom all recognised the newly-formed Sandu cabinet as the legitimate government. On 14 June Filip stepped down and allowed the PSRM–ACUM government to take office. However, the new government was subsequently ousted in a motion of no confidence in Parliament on 12 November in a dispute over a draft law assumed by the government to delegate a part of its plenary powers to the Prime Minister to propose a "shortlist" with the candidates for Prosecutor General's position.

Another new PSRM–PDM government, headed by Ion Chicu, was formed on 14 November 2019. The Democratic Party left the coalition on 7 November 2020, during presidential elections, to allow the formation of a new government under the new president. The Chicu cabinet remained in office as a minority government, supported by the Șor Party, with the PDM ministers replaced by independents. Former prime minister and PAS (ACUM) leader Maia Sandu was elected president on 15 November 2020. Chicu resigned as Prime Minister on 23 December, hours ahead of a PAS-sponsored motion of no confidence.

Sandu planned to appoint Natalia Gavrilița to the position of Prime Minister twice in order to trigger early elections, as under the constitution of Moldova, two failures of Parliament to approve a new government within 45 days of the first request will lead to the dissolution of parliament. Sandu first nominated Gavrilița to the position on 27 January 2021, with her candidacy being unanimously voted down by the parliament on 11 February. The PSRM and its allies then proposed Mariana Durleșteanu for the position with the support of 54 of 101 MPs, but Sandu instead re-nominated Gavrilița on 11 February 2021. However, the Constitutional Court ruled on 23 February 2021 that Sandu should not have nominated Gavrilița twice. Sandu nominated Igor Grosu to the position on 16 March after Durleșteanu withdrew her candidacy.

Grosu failed to get his government approved due to the socialist-led opposition boycotting the vote, which resulted in the vote failing due to a lack of a quorum. The two failed attempts made early parliamentary elections possible, and Sandu asked the Constitutional Court to verify the constitutionality of dissolving parliament and holding snap elections. However, on 31 March Parliament voted to impose a 60-day state of emergency, during which a snap election could not be held, to curb the COVID-19 pandemic. On 15 April the Constitutional Court ruled in favour of dissolving parliament. On 28 April the Constitutional Court declared the state of emergency voted by the Parliament on 31 March unconstitutional as the Decision of Parliament which instituted it was adopted in violation of the rules of procedure, having failed to establish why exactly the executive need extended powers. Later the same day, president Maia Sandu signed the dissolution decree of the Parliament and established the snap parliamentary elections to be held on 11 July 2021.

== Electoral system ==
The 101 seats in the Parliament are elected by party-list proportional representation in a single nationwide constituency. An electoral list may contain 51 to 103 candidates. The nationwide electoral threshold varies depending on the type of list; for single parties or organisations it is 5%; for an electoral bloc of two or more parties it is 7%. For independent candidates the threshold is 2%.

== Parties and coalitions ==
Below is a list of the main parties and electoral blocs which contested the election:

Party or coalition		Lead candidate	Main ideology	International stance	Last election		Government
Party or coalition		Lead candidate	Main ideology	International stance	Vote %	Seats	Government
BECS	PSRM	Vladimir Voronin	Democratic socialism Communism; Social conservatism	Russophilia; Euroscepticism	35.0% (Note: Results for PSRM (31.2%) and PCRM (3.8%) in the 2019 parliamentary election.)	35	Minority government
BECS	PCRM	Vladimir Voronin	Democratic socialism Communism; Social conservatism	Russophilia; Euroscepticism	35.0%	35	Opposition
PDM		Pavel Filip	Social Democracy	Pro-Europeanism	23.6%	30	Opposition
PAS		Igor Grosu	Liberalism	Pro-Europeanism	26.8% (Note: Results for ACUM in the 2019 parliamentary election.)	15	Opposition
PPDA		Andrei Năstase	Liberalism	Pro-Europeanism	26.8%	11	Opposition
ȘOR		Ilan Shor	National conservatism Populism	Russophilia; Hard Euroscepticism	8.35%	7	Opposition

=== Competing electoral lists ===
This is a list of the parties that were represented in the parliament before the elections and the parties that submitted their list for participating in it.

Party	Main ideology	Leader	Seats prior to elections
Electoral Bloc of Communists and Socialists (BECS)	Socialism & Communism	Vladimir Voronin & Igor Dodon	37
Party of Action and Solidarity (PAS)	Liberalism	Igor Grosu	15
Dignity and Truth Platform Party (PPDA)	Liberalism	Andrei Năstase	11
Democratic Party of Moldova (PDM)	Social democracy	Pavel Filip	10
Șor Party	National conservatism	Ilan Shor	7
Pro Moldova	Liberal conservatism	Andrian Candu	7
National Unity Party (PUN)	Unionism	Octavian Țîcu	0
Electoral Bloc "Renato Usatîi" (BERU)	Russophilia	Renato Usatîi	No seats
Alliance for the Union of Romanians (AUR)	Unionism	Vlad Bilețchi	No seats
Democracy at Home Party (PPDA)	Unionism	Vasile Costiuc	No seats
Ecologist Green Party (PEV)	Green politics	Vladimir Braga	No seats
Party of Law and Justice (PLD)	Christian democracy	Nicolae Alexei	No seats
New Historical Option (NOI)	Social democracy	Svetlana Chesari	No seats
We Build Europe at Home Party (PACE)	Liberalism	Gheorghe Cavcaliuc	No seats
Party of Development and Consolidation of Moldova (PDCM)	Pro-Europeanism	Ion Chicu	No seats
Party of Regions of Moldova (PRM)	Russophilia	Alexandr Kalinin	No seats
Collective Action Party – Civic Congress (PAC-CC)	Democratic socialism	Iurie Muntean	No seats
Working People's Party (POM)	Social democracy	Serghei Toma	No seats
People's Power Party (PPO)		Ruslan Codreanu	No seats
MPS		Ilie Donica	No seats
New Party (PNOI)		Vladimir Dachi	No seats
Patriots of Moldova (PPM)		Mihail Garbuz	No seats
Party of Change (PS)		Ștefan Gligor	No seats
Veaceslav Valico**		Veaceslav Valico	No seats

* = Note: Pro Moldova did not participate in the 2021 parliamentary election
** = Independent politician

== Opinion polls ==
PSRM BECS ACUM PAS PPPDA PDM ȘOR PCRM PN

== Results ==
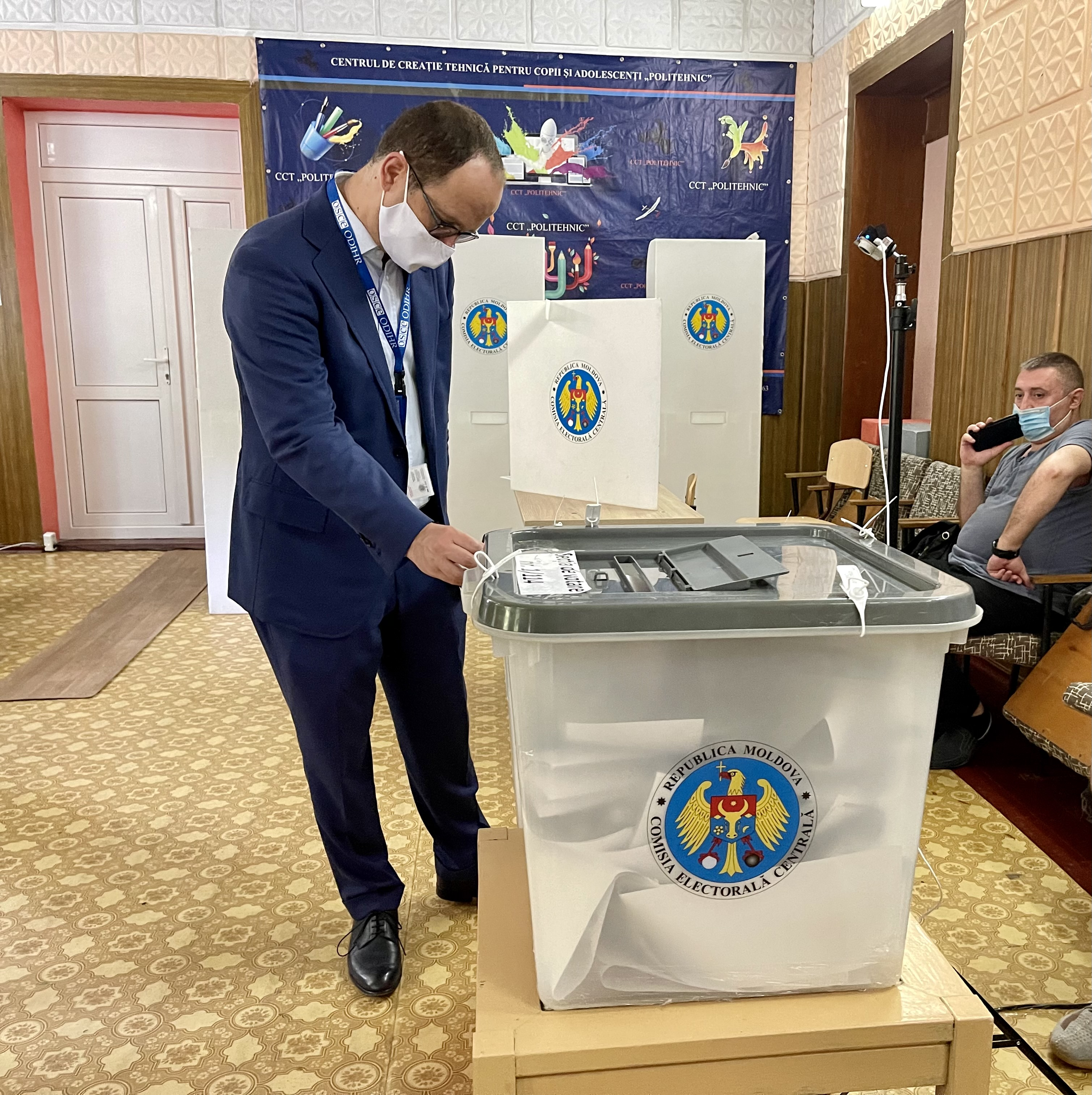
OSCE Special Co-ordinator Ditmir Bushati observing election procedures in Chișinău

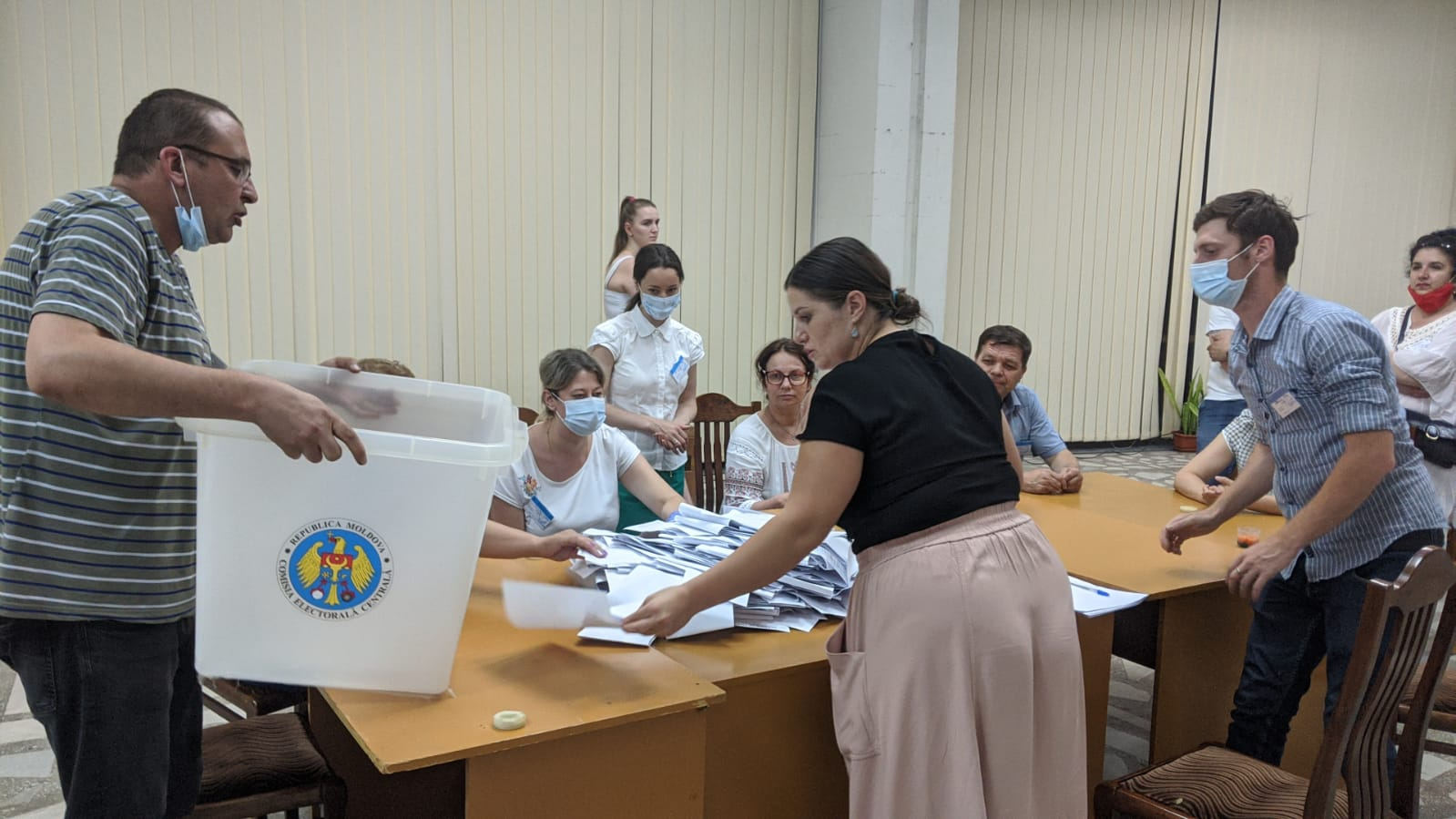
Closing of polling station in Chișinău

Results of the election, showing vote strength by commune.

The Party of Action and Solidarity (PAS) received 52.80% of the vote and won an absolute majority in parliament, taking 63 of the 101 seats, an increase of 48. President of Moldova Maia Sandu stated after the election: "I hope that today is the end of a hard era for Moldova, I hope today is the end of the reign of thieves over Moldova."

The Electoral Bloc of Communists and Socialists (BECS) won 32 seats, a loss of three compared to the previous elections. President of the Party of Socialists (PSRM) Igor Dodon stated after the election: "I appeal to the future deputies of the new parliament, we must not allow a new political crisis in Moldova. It would be nice to have a period of political stability."

The Șor Party (ȘP) became the third and smallest one with parliamentary representation, obtaining six seats with 5.74% of the vote and thereby conserving its parliamentary status from the previous legislature.

On 23 July, the Constitutional Court of Moldova confirmed the results of the election.

Party	Votes	%	Seats	+/–
Party of Action and Solidarity	774,753	52.80	63	+48
Bloc of Communists and Socialists	398,675	27.17	32	−3
Șor Party	84,187	5.74	6	−1
Electoral Bloc "Renato Usatîi"	60,100	4.10	0	0
Dignity and Truth Platform	34,184	2.33	0	−11
Democratic Party of Moldova	26,545	1.81	0	−30
Democracy at Home Party	21,255	1.45	0	0
We Build Europe at Home Party	18,781	1.28	0	New
Common Action Party – Civil Congress	11,269	0.77	0	New
Alliance for the Union of Romanians	7,216	0.49	0	New
National Unity Party	6,646	0.45	0	0
Party of Development and Consolidation	6,315	0.43	0	New
Movement of Professionals "Hope"	2,814	0.19	0	0
Party of Change	2,452	0.17	0	New
People's Power Party	1,613	0.11	0	New
Working People's Party	1,467	0.10	0	New
Party of Law and Justice	1,444	0.10	0	New
"NOI" Political Party	1,431	0.10	0	New
Party of Regions of Moldova	1,264	0.09	0	0
Ecologist Green Party	1,202	0.08	0	0
Patriots of Moldova	892	0.06	0	New
New Historical Option	197	0.01	0	New
Independents	2,514	0.17	0	−3
Total	1,467,216	100.00	101	0
Valid votes	1,467,216	99.07		
Invalid/blank votes	13,749	0.93		
Total votes	1,480,965	100.00		
Registered voters/turnout	3,052,603	48.51		
Source: CEC, PACE

Popular vote
PAS	52.80%
BECS	27.17%
ȘOR	5.74%
BE "RU"	4.10%
PPPDA	2.33%
PDM	1.81%
PPDA	1.45%
PACE	1.28%
Others	3.32%

Seat share
PAS	62.38%
BECS	31.68%
ȘOR	5.94%

=== Voter turnout ===
Election year	Time				
Election year	9:30	12:30	15:30	18:30	21:00
2019	5.90%	24.00%	37.40%	45.70%	49.10%
2020	5.50%	19.60%	33.00%	42.50%	45.60%
2021	8.80%	23.70%	33.20%	41.90%	48.30%
Source: alegeri.md

=== Results by administrative-territorial unit ===
No.	Administrative-territorial unit	%	PAS	BECS	ȘOR	BERU	PPDA	PDM	AUR
1	Chișinău	47.68	56.77	28.40	3.63	2.36	2.16	0.72	0.67
2	Bălți	42.82	27.34	40.17	3.89	22.69	0.99	0.65	0.30
3	Anenii Noi	42.68	50.17	29.51	5.67	2.59	3.03	3.30	0.54
4	Basarabeasca	37.34	40.76	35.31	7.57	4.73	2.02	2.39	0.44
5	Briceni	41.29	25.49	50.77	8.82	5.95	1.52	1.78	0.21
6	Cahul	39.71	53.55	29.63	4.15	2.65	1.49	0.86	0.68
7	Cantemir	37.65	55.82	22.11	5.01	3.90	3.02	2.82	0.70
8	Călărași	42.45	60.76	19.10	4.89	1.47	3.51	4.62	0.36
9	Căușeni	42.30	52.99	26.52	5.18	1.74	3.31	3.17	0.36
10	Cimișlia	39.24	56.19	24.59	4.22	1.70	2.58	4.69	0.34
11	Criuleni	48.74	65.87	15.64	6.45	1.51	3.09	1.68	0.57
12	Dondușeni	48.19	25.90	50.70	7.59	6.95	1.79	1.33	0.46
13	Drochia	42.19	39.02	34.88	7.52	9.93	1.94	0.85	0.35
14	Dubăsari	43.85	45.16	33.08	7.42	2.32	2.31	3.42	0.44
15	Edineț	44.12	29.20	47.11	7.94	5.20	2.40	2.68	0.29
16	Fălești	43.66	36.53	31.77	6.41	15.15	1.27	4.13	0.28
17	Florești	43.47	41.07	35.09	8.72	5.94	2.26	1.02	0.30
18	Glodeni	42.56	33.08	34.02	7.85	10.39	1.79	8.09	0.37
19	Hîncești	39.94	63.87	16.90	3.09	1.93	3.43	3.62	0.55
20	Ialoveni	47.58	71.80	10.05	2.58	2.57	5.03	2.23	0.44
21	Leova	41.03	54.26	24.76	5.06	4.39	2.58	2.38	0.43
22	Nisporeni	40.58	65.95	14.49	3.22	2.26	3.64	3.02	0.59
23	Ocnița	48.80	19.17	59.55	8.22	3.83	1.10	1.27	0.34
24	Orhei	46.66	46.70	8.97	36.98	1.06	1.50	0.85	0.38
25	Rezina	47.56	48.66	26.27	11.23	2.55	4.45	1.23	0.29
26	Rîșcani	46.26	32.01	41.67	5.28	8.86	2.11	5.15	0.41
27	Sîngerei	41.37	46.15	28.89	7.98	8.60	2.20	1.07	0.31
28	Soroca	45.11	40.03	38.65	6.05	3.51	2.37	2.96	0.63
29	Strășeni	44.10	67.55	15.48	3.03	1.90	2.80	2.51	0.60
30	Șoldănești	45.72	40.64	28.79	10.43	3.21	2.83	7.48	0.36
31	Ștefan Vodă	41.63	54.11	25.09	3.89	2.32	4.75	2.98	0.57
32	Taraclia	42.30	6.52	58.05	28.24	1.24	0.24	0.72	0.31
33	Telenești	44.37	59.59	13.01	9.34	1.22	8.29	3.01	0.37
34	Ungheni	43.61	50.80	28.29	4.53	3.42	2.87	3.29	0.40
35	U.T.A. Găgăuzia	36.87	4.14	80.75	4.86	3.15	0.15	0.55	0.03
36	Transnistria		13.59	62.21	6.25	1.82	1.20	2.75	0.38
37	Diplomatic missions (Moldovan diaspora)		86.23	2.47	0.59	2.78	1.75	0.34	0.62
Total		48.41	52.80	27.17	5.74	4.10	2.33	1.81	0.49
Source: CEC

== Reactions ==
- Moldova: President Maia Sandu said this was "the end of the reign of thieves in Moldova. The challenges are great, people need results and must feel the benefits of a clean parliament and an honest and competent government." She called for "the energy of today's vote to transform Moldova."
- Party of Socialists of the Republic of Moldova: PSRM president Igor Dodon conceded and expressed disappointment at the result, saying in a statement: "We obviously wanted a higher overall percentage." He congratulated his opponents but warned that his forces would be watching closely because it was dangerous for one party to have "the total monopoly on Moldovan politics."

=== International reactions ===
- Organization for Security and Co-operation in Europe: OSCE issued a statement that "Moldova's early parliamentary elections were competitive and well run despite the inadequate handling of election disputes and campaign finance issues, say international observers on a joint observation mission from the OSCE Office for Democratic Institutions and Human Rights (ODIHR), the OSCE Parliamentary Assembly (OSCE PA), the Parliamentary Assembly of the Council of Europe (PACE), and the European Parliament (EP)."
- Commonwealth of Independent States: Dmitry Kobitsky, head of the CIS IPA monitoring mission, said: "Members of the mission attended the vote counting and noted that this procedure was held in line with the requirements of the Electoral Code. The CIS observers did not report any violations that could influence the results of the elections".
- Renew Europe: Renew Europe issued the statement: "Victory for democracy in Moldova! Congratulations to Moldova! This is a victory for democracy, a victory for Europe, a victory for an extraordinary woman and a victory for the Moldovan citizens who are eager for their country to finally take the path of economic, social and political reforms."
- Germany: Federal Minister of Defense Annegret Kramp-Karrenbauer said: "Congratulations, Maia Sandu, on the great election victory of PAS with 52,5%! This is very strong support for you and the course for reforms and the fight against corruption in the Republic of Moldova. Great news!"
- Latvia: Minister of Foreign Affairs Edgars Rinkēvičs said: "Very convincing victory of reform and European agenda in Moldova elections. Now the real implementation of promised changes is key, Latvia is ready to provide all the necessary support to our Moldovan friends. Congratulations, Moldova!"
- Lithuania: Prime Minister Ingrida Šimonytė said: "Congratulations Maia Sandu on a landslide victory of PAS in early parliamentary elections and the people of Moldova – on choosing the path of reforms, transparency & European integration. You can count on Lithuania's support!"
- Romania: President Klaus Iohannis said: "Congratulations to the citizens of the Republic of Moldova for their civic spirit and clear choice for reforms, the rule of law and European integration! Congratulations Maia Sandu for courage, perseverance and vision! Romania will be with the Republic of Moldova in supporting the reforms and the European course!"
- Slovakia: Minister of Foreign Affairs Ivan Korčok said: "I congratulate the people of Moldova on succesfull [sic] conduct of democratic parliamentary elections & the strong confirmation of their will to proceed on European path."
- Ukraine: President Volodymyr Zelenskyy said: "Congratulations to my colleague President of Moldova Maia Sandu on a convincing victory of democratic pro-European political forces, in particular the PAS party, in the parliamentary elections! This is an important step for a friendly on the path of reforms & European aspirations!"

== Analysis and aftermath ==
PAS was the first party to win an absolute majority of seats on its own since April 2009, and the first to win an absolute majority of votes since 2001. It was also the first time that neither PSRM nor PCRM won the most votes or seats since 1994. Former PAS coalition partner DA also lost all of its seats, as did the Democratic Party of Moldova (formerly connected to oligarch Vladimir Plahotniuc, who fled the country in 2019), which was no longer represented in parliament for the first time in over a decade. Additionally, no party with a unionist platform entered the parliament.

On 23 July court chairwoman Domnica Manole said in a statement "The Moldovan Constitutional Court rules to confirm the results of the snap parliamentary elections that Moldova held on 11 July 2021, and to recognize the mandates of the parliament members as valid."

The first session of the new parliament was held on 26 July and was chaired by the oldest deputy, Eduard Smirnov.

On 29 July Igor Grosu (the interim leader of PAS) was elected president of the parliament. Natalia Gavrilița was appointed as Prime Minister-designate the following day.

On 6 August 2021 the Natalia Gavrilița-led cabinet was sworn in to office with 61 votes, all from PAS.
