= Party of Regions (disambiguation) =

Party of Regions was a Ukrainian political party.

Party of Regions may also refer to:

- Party of Regions (Polish), Polish political party
- Party of Regions of Moldova (Partidul Regiunilor din Moldova)

== See also ==
- United Regions of Serbia, Serbian political party
