= Renato Usatîi =

Moldovan businessman and politician

Renato Usatîi MP
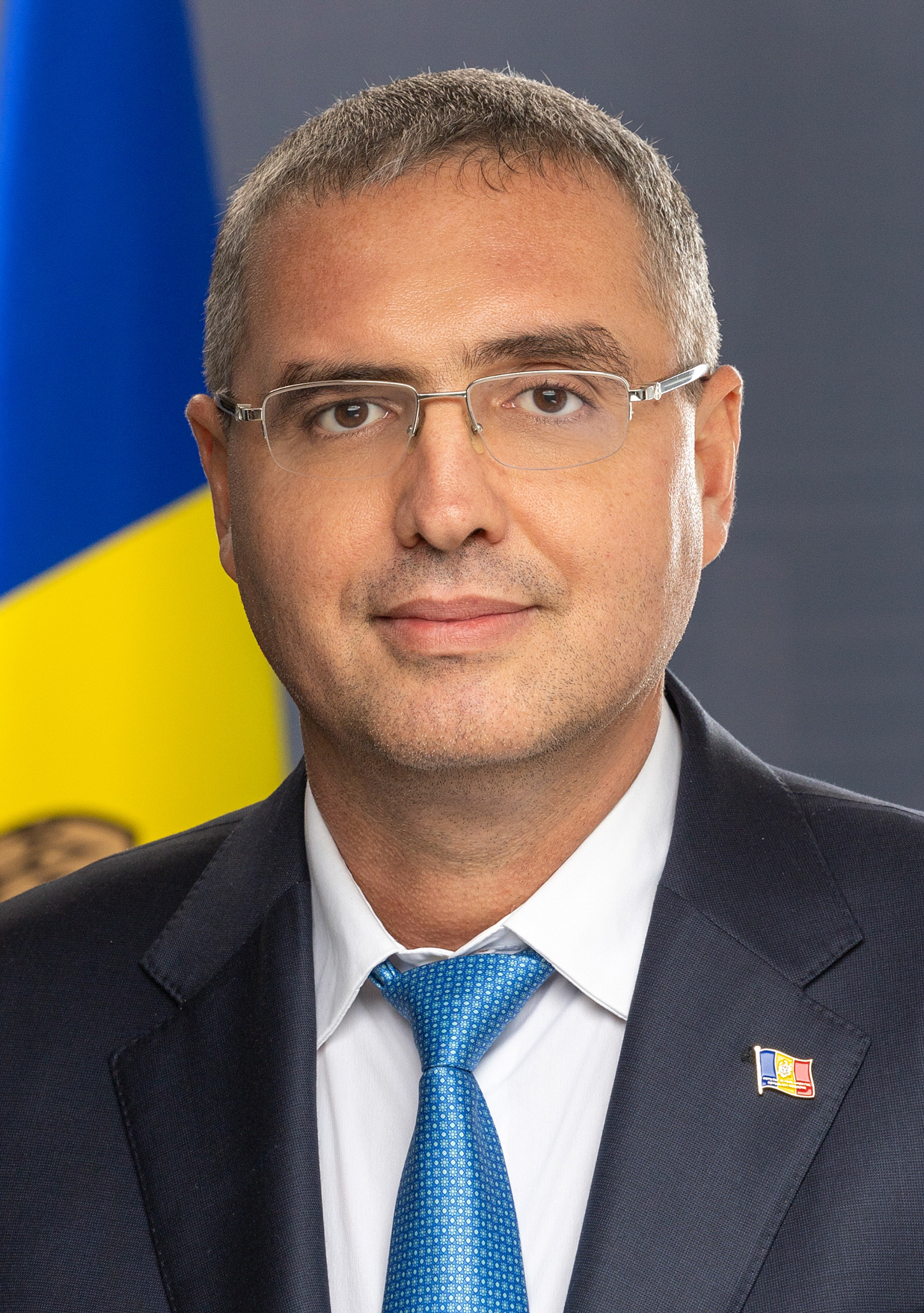
- Official portrait, 2025

Member of the Moldovan Parliament
- Incumbent
- Assumed office 22 October 2025
- Parliamentary group: Our Party

President of Our Party
- Incumbent
- Assumed office 8 February 2015
- Preceded by: Nicolae Andronic (as President of the Republican Popular Party)

Mayor of Bălți
- In office 1 November 2019 – 12 July 2021
- Preceded by: Nicolae Grigorișin
- Succeeded by: Nicolae Grigorișin
- In office 29 June 2015 – 15 February 2018
- Preceded by: Vasilii Panciuc
- Succeeded by: Nicolae Grigorișin

Personal details
- Born: 4 November 1978 (age 47) Fălești, Moldavian SSR, Soviet Union
- Citizenship: Moldova; Russia (since 2018)
- Party: Our Party
- Spouse(s): Carolina Tampiza (m. 2002; div. 2011) Nina Crețu (m. 2021; div. 2024)
- Children: 3
- Relatives: Constantin Tampiza (former father-in-law)
- Education: Alecu Russo State University of Bălți
- Occupation: Businessman • Politician
- Website: ru1.md/en/

Renato Usatîi (born 4 November 1978) is a Moldovan politician and businessman serving as President of Our Party since 8 February 2015. He was elected mayor of Bălți for two terms (from 2015 to 2018 and from 2019 to 2021).

Usatîi's political positions have been described as populist and anti-establishment. He participated in the 2014 Moldovan parliamentary election as a candidate on the electoral list of the political party "Patria". The party was excluded from the race three days before the election, a decision declared arbitrary by the European Court of Human Rights. Usatîi intended to participate in the 2016 Moldovan presidential election but was unable to after a decision of the Constitutional Court of Moldova changed the minimum age required for someone to serve as president from 35 to 40. He voiced the opinion that the court's decision was issued to specifically prevent him from running for president. The president of the Constitutional Court later denied the accusations. Usatîi participated in the 2020 Moldovan presidential election and came in third, securing 16.9% of the votes.

== Early life and education ==
Renato Usatîi was born on 4 November 1978 in Fălești, Moldavian SSR, Soviet Union (now Republic of Moldova) to two English language teachers. He attended a Russian-medium school. In 1994 he won first place in the Republican English Language Olympiad, thanks to which he was admitted to the Faculty of Foreign Languages and Literatures of the Alecu Russo State University of Bălți, which he later graduated from.

== Professional and business career ==
From 2000 to 2001 Usatîi worked as a supervisor at the Chișinău International Airport. Later, between 2002 and 2004 he worked as a Lead Engineer of the food production facility at the Calea Ferată din Moldova (English: Moldovan Railway). In 2004 Usatîi emigrates to Russia. In 2005 he co-founded ″VPT-NN″, a company producing railway equipment. From 2005 to 2015 he served as president of the company.

== Political career ==
=== 2014 parliamentary election ===
In April 2014, Usatîi was elected as the new leader of the Republican People's Party after a unanimous vote of the 248 delegates present at the fourth Congress of the party. After electing a new president, the party renamed itself to “Our Party”. On 10 June 2014, the Ministry of Justice of Moldova denied Usatîi's request to change the party's name saying that the rebranding was voted in violation of the party's internal regulations. He considered the decision politically motivated and accused the Ministry of following the Liberal Democratic Party of Moldova's orders. In August 2014, Usatîi founded a new party named “PaRUs” (Party of Renato Usatîi) with the intention of participating in the 2014 Moldovan parliamentary election. The party was denied registration by the Ministry of Justice, which cited suspicions that around 30% of the signatures submitted had been forged.

On 30 September, Usatîi announced that he was going to participate in the 2014 parliamentary election as a candidate on the electoral list of the political party "Patria". The party was excluded from the race three days before the elections on the grounds that it used money from abroad to finance its electoral campaign. In August 2020, the European Court of Human Rights concluded that the exclusion was not based on sufficient and relevant evidence. The Court also mentioned that the decisions of the national authorities were unreasonable and arbitrary. On 27 November, Usatîi announced that he was leaving the country citing fears of imminent arrest. In February 2015, the Republican People's Party again rebranded itself to “Our Party” and elected Usatîi as its leader. This time the changes were approved by the Ministry of Justice.

=== First term as Mayor of Bălți: 2015–2018 ===
Usatîi returned to Moldova in May 2015 and decided to run for Mayor of Bălți. He won the election by a decisive margin and was inaugurated as mayor on 2 July. Under his leadership, in October 2017, the Bălți administration was declared the most transparent city administration in Moldova by the IDIS-Viitorul Institute and the Slovak Institute for Economic and Social Reforms "INEKO".

In October 2016, a national and international arrest warrant was issued for Usatîi. In September 2016, Usatîi left the country for Russia and remained there until the 2019 Moldovan constitutional crisis and the inauguration of the Sandu Cabinet.

=== 2015–2016 protests ===
Renato Usatîi and Our Party actively participated in the organization of the 2015–2016 protests in Moldova. In September 2015, Usatîi, along with Igor Dodon, set up a tent encampment in front of the Parliament building calling it „Victory City”. During that time, Usatîi also posted multiple videos encouraging people to participate in the antigovernmental protests.

=== 2016 presidential election ===
In the summer of 2016, Usatîi said that Vlad Plahotniuc offered him $1.5 million in exchange for him ceasing any involvement in Moldovan politics until the presidential election and an even larger sum in exchange for him quitting politics altogether. He added that Plahotniuc wanted him to resign from his position as mayor of Bălți and leader of „Our Party” and that he refused the offer. An opinion poll conducted on behalf of the International Republican Institute showed Usatîi receiving 20% of the votes and coming in first in the first round. As a result of a decision of the Constitutional Court of Moldova from March 2016, the minimum age required for someone to serve as president was changed from 35 to 40. The decision rendered Usatîi unable to participate in the presidential elections as he was only 37 at the time. He voiced the opinion that the court's decision was issued to specifically prevent him from running for president. The president of the Constitutional Court later denied the accusations. In the first round of the election, Usatîi supported „Our Party” candidate Dumitru Ciubaşenco. In the second round he endorsed Igor Dodon.

=== Second term as Mayor of Bălți: 2019-2021 ===
Usatîi returned to Moldova in June 2019 following the inauguration of the Sandu Cabinet. In October 2019 he decisively won the Bălți mayoral election by securing 64.46% of the votes in the first round. In July 2020, the Bălți city administration was declared the most transparent city administration nationwide for the fourth year in a row by the IDIS-Viitorul Institute and the Slovakian Institute for Economic and Social Reforms "INEKO". In September 2020, Usatîi suspended his activities as mayor of Bălți in order to participate in the 2020 Moldovan presidential election

=== 2020 presidential election ===
In July 2020 Usatîi announced that he wanted the people to decide whether he should run for president in 2020. During a press conference, he asked people to record short videos in which they would express their views on his potential candidacy and send them to him before 27 August 2020. On 26 August 2020, Usatîi posted a YouTube compilation video with people expressing support for his candidacy and claimed that tens of thousands of people asked him to run for president. The next day, Usatîi organized an open air press conference during which he officially announced his candidacy for the 2020 elections.

Usatîi's campaign emphasized several priorities, including organizing snap parliamentary elections, eradicating corruption by forming a Moldovan equivalent of Mossad, abolishing district authorities and intensifying economic cooperation with Romania and Ukraine. He also heavily criticized incumbent president Igor Dodon, accusing him of spending a week in a luxury resort financed by taxpayer money, fabricating opinion polls, illegally spying on his campaign and attempting to rig the election by paying Moldovan citizens from Transnistria to vote for him. He came in third in the first round securing 16.9% of the votes. After his elimination in the first round, Usatîi advised his supporters to vote against Dodon in the second round but did not endorse Sandu.

=== 2021 snap parliamentary elections ===
After the Constitutional Court of Moldova declared the emergency state unconstitutional on 28 April 2021, later that day Maia Sandu signed the decree of dissolution of the Parliament and the snap elections on July 11, 2021. Renato Usatîi announced on 5 May the electoral bloc with his name, formed between Our Party and Patria Party. After the elections, Electoral Bloc Renato Usatîi got 4,1% of votes (7% threshold) and did not win representation in the 11th convocation of the Parliament of Moldova. In Bălți, the electoral bloc gained the 3rd place (after BECS and PAS). On July 12, Usatîi announced his resignation as Mayor of Bălți.

=== 2024 presidential campaign ===
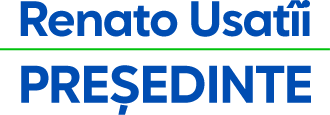
Usatîi's 2024 presidential campaign logo

On 21 September 2024, Usatîi announced his candidacy for the 2024 Moldovan presidential election as the nominee for Our Party. He claims to be the candidate who "unites society" and will "fight for the future of Moldova." He has stated if elected president he is "obliged to destroy the system that has kept Moldova on its knees for the last 33 years. Moldova must be a country where there is law, a country where thieves and traitors are held accountable, where every citizen has a dignified life. For this, a strong leader is needed to lead the country."

During the election, incumbent President Maia Sandu refused to debate with Usatîi and Alexandr Stoianoglo of the Party of Socialists of the Republic of Moldova, which was criticized by Russophiles in Moldova.

Usatîi failed to advance past the first round of the 2024 election on 20 October, placing third with 13.79% of the vote. Despite having opposed Igor Dodon (tacitly endorsing Sandu) in the 2020 presidential election, he declined to support either Sandu or Stoianoglo in the runoff held on 3 November.

Incumbent President Maia Sandu announced after the first round of the presidential election that "criminal groups together with foreign forces" had attempted to "buy 300,000 votes." The police later confirmed that approximately $39 million were allocated to a group led by Ilan Șor, intended to bribe voters. The money ended up in the accounts of 138,000 Moldovans, and the number of voters who were allegedly bribed exceeds 300,000.

=== 2024 Moldovan EU membership referendum ===
Our Party and Renato Usatîi did not have any position on the referendum on European integration. Usatîi did not take the ballot for the referendum.

=== 2025 parliamentary elections ===
On September 28, 2025, parliamentary elections were held, as a result of which the Our Party, led by Renato Usatîi, obtained 6 deputy mandates, being voted for by 6.20% of voters.

For the first time in its political history, the Our Party is entering the Parliament of the Republic of Moldova. In a statement made after the elections, Renato Usatîi stated that the Our Party intends to support in Parliament any "well-founded" initiative that contributes to improving the lives of the citizens of the Republic of Moldova and expressed hope that the other parliamentary factions will support the party's initiatives.

== Philanthropy ==
Renato Usatîi organised a series of cultural events in various localities across the Republic of Moldova, featuring renowned artists from Romania, Europe and Russia. He carried out several charitable acts, repeatedly donating significant sums of money. For instance, he donated one million lei to teachers in the Fălești district, one hundred thousand lei to the local church, and another hundred thousand lei to the Kickboxing Federation. Additionally, he donated 500,000 lei for the construction of an artificial spring with a waterfall in the center of Fălești city.

Through his social initiatives, Renato Usatîi gave hundreds of children the opportunity to go to the seaside, donated specialised equipment to several town halls in the Republic of Moldova, and supported the medical system through donations to hospitals across the country, including the municipal hospital in Bălți.

== Personal life ==
Renato Usatîi was married to Carolina Tampiza, the daughter of businessman and former politician Constantin Tampiza. He has three children: two daughters and one son. His eldest daughter, Valeria (born 2003), is a student at the University of Venice, studying to become a fashion designer. His other daughter is named Alexandra (born 2010). In 2019, Usatîi revealed that he also has a son, also named Renato, whose existence he had kept secret for several years.

On New Year’s Eve between 2021 and 2022, Renato Usatîi posted a photo alongside Nina Crețu, announcing that they were in a relationship. The two separated in 2024.

== Controversies ==
=== Phone tampering allegations ===
On 23 October 2015, Usatîi was arrested in Chișinău and charged with illegal tampering of Vlad Filat's phone, the former prime-minister who himself was arrested for corruption charges. Usatîi confessed he indeed published the phone records but that he thought it was a necessary measure in order to save the country from corruption. On 25 October he was released; the charges were not dismissed.

=== German Gorbuntsov case ===
==== Case ====
In 2012, German Gorbuntsov survived an unsuccessful attempt on his life in central London. In October 2016 an arrest warrant was issued for Usatîi for the alleged assassination attempt of Gorbuntsov. Usatîi denied all charges, describing them as politically motivated and orchestrated by oligarch Vladimir Plahotniuc in an effort to discredit him and neutralize his political influence. He further accused Plahotniuc and his allies of fabricating the case, alleging that Moldova’s judiciary was being used as a tool of political persecution. Years later, the hitman Vitalie Proca stated in an interview that it was Vladimir Plahotniuc, not Usatîi, who had ordered the assassination of Gorbuntsov.

On May 19, 2017, Renato Usatîi submitted a request to Interpol for his removal from its database. According to the politician, the criminal case against him was politically motivated, and the legal proceedings were being conducted in violation of laws and procedures. The Commission for the Control of Interpol’s Files accepted the request on May 29, 2017, and on June 6, 2017, access by Interpol member states to Usatîi’s file was blocked.

In September 2017, the European Court of Human Rights received and agreed to examine a complaint submitted by the lawyers of the leader of "Our Party," Renato Usatîi, regarding “multiple violations” committed by prosecutors. According to attorney Anatolie Istrate, the listed facts point to the “selective nature” of Moldovan justice, and that “the prosecution acts selectively when administering justice.”

The charges were dismissed in 2019 by Moldovan authorities, a development that Usatîi and his supporters cited as evidence of their political nature.

==== Interpol decision ====
In June 2018, the Interpol decided to remove Usatîi's case from their database and remove him from the wanted list. It decided that the charges brought against Usatîi were largely politically motivated and that keeping disputed data in their database could have a negative impact on the Interpol's politically neutral stance.

=== Threats from the Wagner Group and other Russian-aligned actors ===
In mid-October 2024, while campaigning in the Moldovan presidential election, Renato Usatîi released a video in which three masked individuals claiming to be members of the Russian paramilitary Wagner Group threatened him with death, labeling him a “traitor to the Russian people” and warning, “We will come soon.” Usatîi stated that these individuals demanded he withdraw from the election in favor of pro-Kremlin candidate Alexandr Stoianoglo, a move he interpreted as being orchestrated by Russian-aligned forces. He publicly challenged them by saying: "Take off your masks – I want to see my death in the face."

Usatîi claimed the threat was disseminated primarily by pro-PSRM (Party of Socialists of the Republic of Moldova) channels and had the apparent goal of pressuring him to leave the race in favor of Stoianoglo. He reported additional pressure in the form of cyberattacks and financial interference aimed at undermining his campaign after he refused to withdraw.

This episode has been interpreted by some analysts as reflecting active opposition from Russian-affiliated paramilitary groups, signaling Putin-friendly elements targeting Usatîi and reinforcing concerns about foreign influence seeking to shape Moldova’s domestic politics.

== Political orientation and foreign policy vision ==
Renato Usatîi was previously known for his pro-Russian views and ties to Russia. Until 2019, his political activity was characterized by support for a neutral foreign policy and criticism of pro-European forces in Moldova. The political party he leads, "Our Party", does not promote accession either to the European Union or to the Eurasian Customs Union, but rather opts for promoting the vector of national development and claims that public officials are obliged to submit to the decision of the citizens.

Internationally, Usatîi maintained relationships with populist political movements, including Russia’s Liberal Democratic Party (LDPR), with which “Our Party” signed a cooperation agreement in 2017. However, LDPR leader Vladimir Zhirinovsky did not formalize any ideological alliance, and no official declarations were signed on his part.

In 2016, Usatîi left Moldova amid multiple criminal investigations and took refuge in Russia. However, starting in 2019, relations between Usatîi and the Russian authorities deteriorated significantly after criminal proceedings were launched against him in Russia as well. He later relocated to Germany and eventually returned to Moldova.

In November 2023, Renato Usatîi officially renounced his Russian citizenship, citing political persecution and abuse by Russian institutions. The decision, which he described as a protest against the actions of the Russian authorities, was unexpected and interpreted as a definitive break from his prior association with Russia. In 2024, he confirmed that the case is still being handled by his lawyers.

Despite his past connections, Usatîi has repeatedly denied being part of any political project orchestrated by the Kremlin. He has stated that while he had contacts within various Russian governmental institutions, he was not politically affiliated or directed by them. He pointed to his removal from elections as evidence that he did not benefit from Kremlin support.

In a televised interview in June 2025, Usatîi emphasized that "Our Party" is independent and not controlled by Moscow, Brussels, or Washington. He advocated for ending Moldova’s cycle of alternating between pro-Russian and pro-European governments, calling it a form of political instability. “We must reject the practice that has existed so far, when Moldova is governed for four years by pro-Russian political forces and then by pro-European ones,” he said. Usatîi also criticized the ruling Party of Action and Solidarity (PAS) for lacking effective governance and called for a broad dialogue among all political parties, both parliamentary and extra-parliamentary. He further noted that among his supporters, there is a balance of perspectives on national identity, with roughly half identifying Romanian and half identifying Moldovan as the state language.
