= Moldovans in Russia =

Demographics of Russia

The Moldovans in Russia consists of two major parts: Russian citizens and labor migrants (gastarbeiters).

According to the 2002 Russian Census there were 172,196 Moldovans among the legal residents of Russia. (Note: The Russian Census (2002) included legal residents: citizens, legal permanent residents, legal immigration status seekers, and authorized workers and students, as well as some categories of non-residents.) According to the 2010 Russian Census there were 156,400 Moldovans, as well as 3,201 Romanians. According to the U.S. Census Bureau, 544 ethnic Romanians born in Russia lived in the United States in 2015. According to the 2021 Russian census there were 77,509 Moldovans living in Russia.

The head of the diaspora is Alexandr Kalinin the leader of the Party of Regions of Moldova. In Russia, he heads the Congress of Moldovan Diasporas (Конгресс Молдавских Диаспор) established in 2009.

According to the 2014 estimate of the Russian Federal Migration Service, there were over 550,000 nationals of Moldova in Russia, with an estimated 228,000 illegal residents. In 2013, about 33,500 work permits were issued to Moldovan citizens. In 2025, Central Electoral Commission of Moldova (CEC) vice president Pavel Postica stated that, according to official data presented by the Ministry of Foreign Affairs of Moldova, a little over 200,000 Moldovan citizens were in the territory of Russia at the time.

At the end of 2018 Presidents of Russia and Moldova declared a migration law amnesty for Moldovan citizens who would return to Moldova between January 1 and 23, 2019. Alexandr Kalinin commented that this move looked like an attempt to boost the election performance of the then Moldovan President Igor Dodon.

== Notable Moldovans in Russia ==
- Ion Druță (1928 - 2023), writer, holds Russian and Moldovan citizenship
- Emil Loteanu (1936-2003), film director; holds Russian, Moldovan and Romanian citizenships
- Eugen Doga (born 1937), composer; holds Russian and Moldovan citizenships
- Andrey Gaydulyan (born 1984), actor; holds Russian and Moldovan citizenships
- Vincent (Morar) (born 1953), bishop of the Russian Orthodox Church; holds Russian and Moldovan citizenships
- Dmitry Bivol (born 1990), boxer (Moldovan father)

== See also ==
- Moldova–Russia relations
- Moldovan diaspora
- Immigration to Russia
- Romanians in Russia
- Russians in Moldova
- Moldovans in Ukraine
- Gagauz people in Russia
