= Pitușca =

- Village
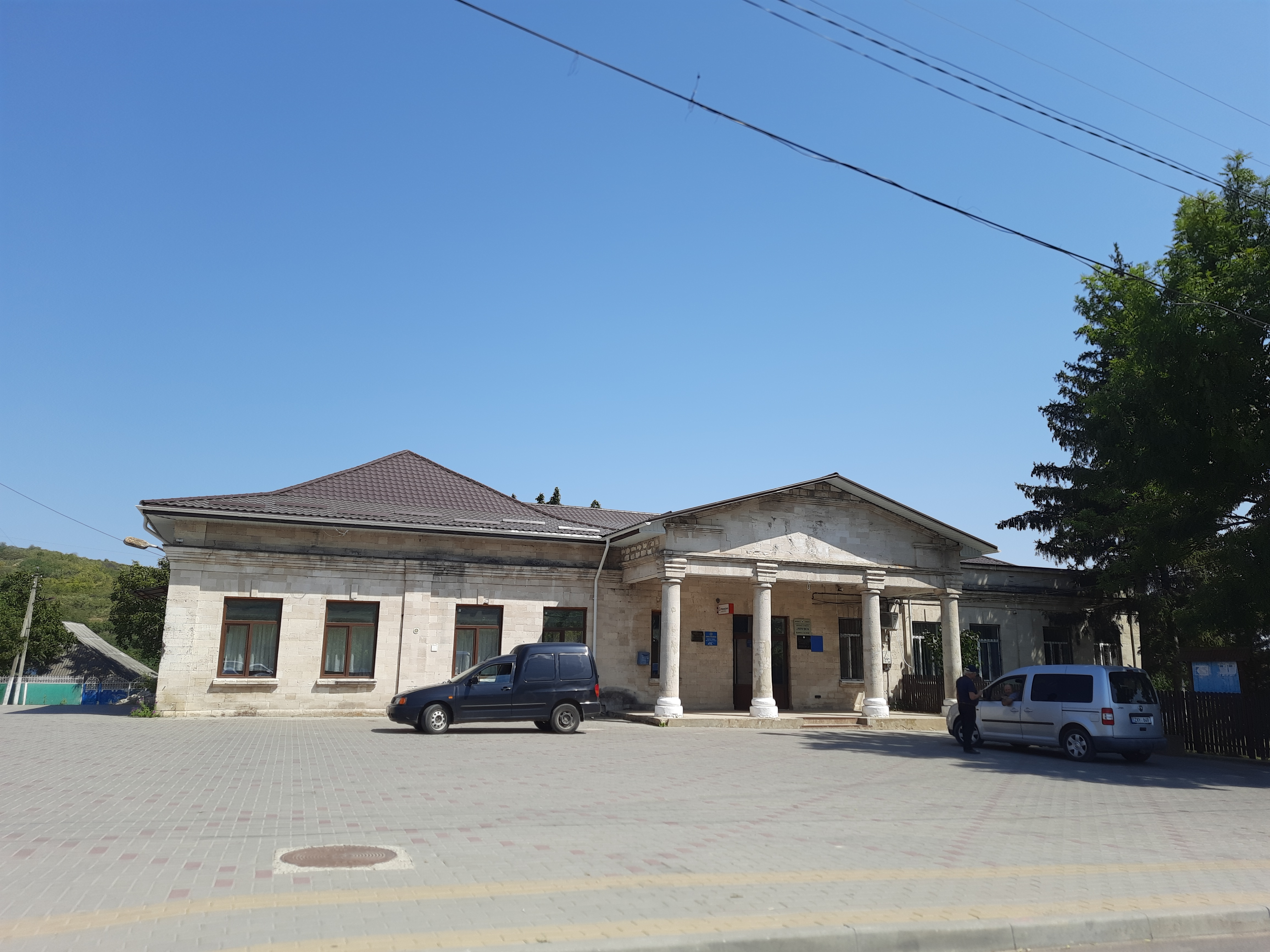
- Administrative building in Pitușca

- Location within Moldova
- Coordinates: 47.2397222222°N 28.4197222222°E
- Country: Moldova
- District: Călărași District

Government
  - Mayor: Ionila Lozovan (PL)

Population (2014 census)
  - Total: 2,832
- Time zone: UTC+2 (EET)
  - Summer (DST): UTC+3 (EEST)

Pitușca is a village in Călărași District, Moldova.

== Notable people ==
- Vladimir Plahotniuc
