= Party of Regions of Moldova =

Moldovan political party

Party of Regions of Moldova Partidul Regiunilor din Moldova
- Abbreviation: PRM
- President: Alexandr Kalinin
- Founder: Mihail Formuzal
- Founded: 23 September 2011; 13 years ago
- Membership (2018): 1,200
- Ideology: Populism; Euroscepticism; Russophilia

Website
- regions.md

The Party of Regions of Moldova (PRM; Romanian: Partidul Regiunilor din Moldova) is a political party in Moldova. It was founded on September 23, 2011, and registered on October 18, 2011. In 2018, it had about 1,200 members.

During 2011–2016, the party was headed by Mihail Formuzal. Since 2016, the leader is lawyer Alexandr Kalinin. Since 2000, he has been representing the Moldovan diaspora in Russia. A decree signed on 27 November 2023 by President of Moldova Maia Sandu withdrew Kalinin's Moldovan citizenship. Kalinin had previously shown his support to the Russian invasion of Ukraine. In one video, he was shown threatening Moldova by painting on a missile "За Молдову" ("For Moldova"), after which the missile is launched.

Kalinin reportedly formed the so-called Dniester detachment, a mercenary unit recruiting Moldovans, including Transnistrians, to fight for Russia during its invasion of Ukraine. He used social media to promote the unit and recruit men for it.

== Electoral results ==
- 2014 Moldovan parliamentary election, part of the bloc "Alegerea Moldovei – Uniunea Vamală" / "Moldova's Choice - Customs Union", whose performance was: votes 55,089 %%: 3.45, seats: 0
- 2015 local general elections: 6 mandates of councilor in city and village councils (0.06%)
- 2020 Moldovan presidential election: Kalinin withdrew.
- 2021 Moldovan parliamentary election: votes: 1,264, %%: 0.09, seats: 0
