= Vladimir Plahotniuc =

Moldovan politician and oligarch (born 1966)

Vlad Plahotniuc
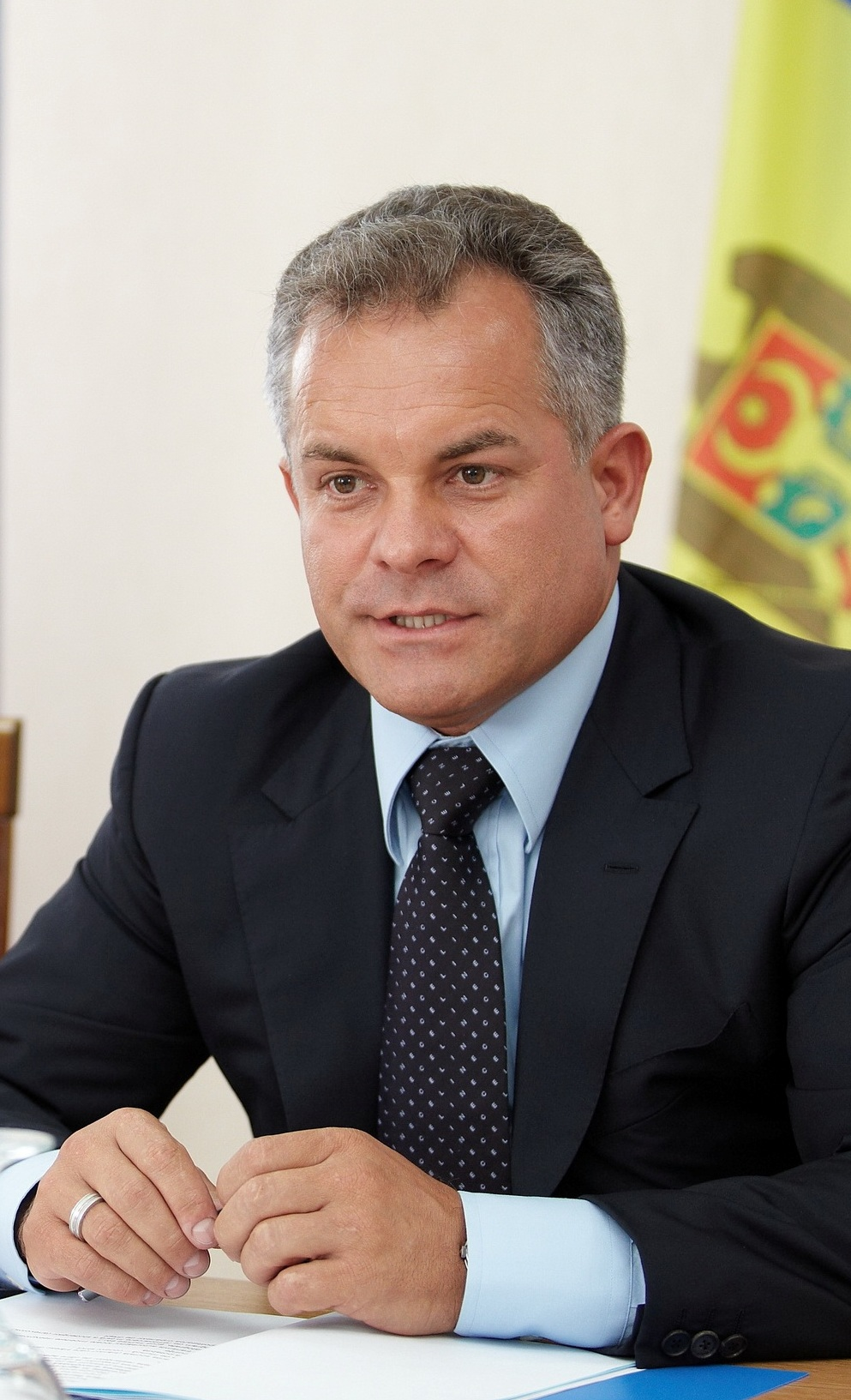
- Plahotniuc in 2011

Member of the Moldovan Parliament
- In office 9 March 2019 – 30 July 2019
- Succeeded by: Ghenadie Verdeș
- Parliamentary group: Democratic Party
- Constituency: Nisporeni
- Majority: 20,926 (72.4%)
- In office 9 December 2014 – 30 July 2015
- Succeeded by: Corneliu Dudnic
- Parliamentary group: Democratic Party
- In office 28 November 2010 – 28 October 2013
- Succeeded by: Ion Stratulat
- Parliamentary group: Democratic Party

President of the Democratic Party
- In office 24 December 2016 – 24 June 2019
- Preceded by: Marian Lupu
- Succeeded by: Pavel Filip

First Vice President of the Moldovan Parliament
- In office 30 December 2010 – 15 February 2013
- President: Marian Lupu (acting); Nicolae Timofti
- Prime Minister: Vlad Filat
- Speaker: Marian Lupu
- Preceded by: Serafim Urechean

Personal details
- Born: Vladimir Plahotniuc; 1 January 1966 (age 60) Pitușca, Moldavian SSR, Soviet Union (now Moldova)
- Citizenship: Moldova; Romania; Turkey; Russia
- Party: Democratic Party of Moldova
- Education: Technical University of Moldova; University of European Studies of Moldova
- Occupation: Politician, businessman
- Profession: Engineer, lawyer
- Website: http://www.plahotniuc.md

Vladimir Plahotniuc (born 1 January 1966), commonly referred to as Vlad Plahotniuc, is a Moldovan politician, oligarch, diplomat, and lobbyist who was the vice president of the Parliament of Moldova from 2010 to 2013. He was the chairman of the Democratic Party of Moldova (24 December 2016 – 24 June 2019) and previously was a member of the Parliament of Moldova for three terms (December 2010 – October 2013, December 2014 – July 2015, February 2019 – July 2019), and served as First Vice President of the Parliament of Moldova (December 2010 – February 2013). Until leaving the territory of the Republic of Moldova in 2019, he was considered to be the powerhouse of Moldovan politics in matters of influence, controlling Moldova's government and parliamentary majority. From his flight from Moldova in June 2019 to 2025, Plahotniuc resided in Turkey.

He was arrested in Greece in July 2025 as he attempted to travel to Dubai. Both Russia and Moldova have demanded his extradition, while Plahotniuc has expressed his wish to return to Moldova. On 25 September 2025, Plahotniuc was extradited from Greece to Moldova. On 22 April 2026, he was sentenced to 19 years in prison.

== Early life and education ==
Plahotniuc was born on 1 January 1966 in Pitușca, Călărași District, Moldavian SSR, Soviet Union (now Moldova). As he stated in an interview, a strong footprint in his education was left by his parents and grandparents. He attended the Grozești village secondary school, in Nisporeni District, graduating in 1983 with a cum laude diploma. In 1991 he graduated the Technical University of Moldova with a bachelor's degree in Engineering, at the Food Industry Technology Faculty. In 2002 he obtained an MBA degree at the same university. In 2006 he obtained a master's degree in Civil Law at the European Studies University of Moldova.

== Career ==
During 1991–1993, he held the position of specialist at the "Minor" Center for prevention and rehabilitation of juvenile offenders, affiliated with the Chișinău City Hall. He held the position of economist at Euro EstHundel Ltd Moldova, then he worked at "Voyage" Ltd Moldova. In 1995–1998 he founded "Angels" Moldovan-American Financial Group, which he managed until 2001. From 2001 to 2010 he held the position of Commercial Manager and afterwards he was the general manager of "Petrom Moldova" JSC, dealing with oil import and distribution. In 2005 he was appointed vice chairman of the board at Victoriabank commercial bank, one of the leading banks of Moldova, and in 2006 he became its chairman, a position he held until January 2011. Since then, he has been focusing on his political career as a member of the Democratic Party of Moldova. In 2015, he founded a large media company, including General Media Group and Radio Media Group.

== Political activity ==
In the 2000s, Vladimir Plahotniuc had strong business ties to the family of the Moldovan President Vladimir Voronin and was considered close to the ruling Party of Communists of the Republic of Moldova. In 2008, after the resignation of Vasile Tarlev, he was on the short list of the next possible prime minister, but, in the end, Zinaida Greceanîi was chosen.

In August 2010 Plahotniuc stated: "I don't get involved in politics. I'm not interested in running on a party list." But on the evening of 19 November 2010, during the meeting of the Political Bureau of the Democratic Party of Moldova, it was decided to include Plahotniuc in 2nd place on its electoral party list. As a result, he delegated the administration of his businesses to his managers to be able to dedicate himself to politics. He became a member of the Parliament in December 2010, a position he held until October 2013, when he resigned.

On 30 December 2010 Plahotniuc was appointed deputy chairman of the Democratic Party of Moldova at the party's National Political Council session. On the same day he was elected as the First Deputy Speaker of the Parliament of the Republic of Moldova. He was also elected as a member of the Parliament's Economy, Budget and Finance Committee.

On 19 May 2011, by presidential decree, Marian Lupu founded the National Council for the Judiciary Reform, which included Plahotniuc as vice-chairman.

In June 2012, Plahotniuc became First Deputy Chairman of the Democratic Party of Moldova.

On 15 February 2013, the parliamentary group of PCRM and PLDM, without the conclusion of the Parliament's "Legal Committee for Appointments and Immunities", together voted a motion of no confidence in Plahotniuc. Following this decision, supported by the votes of 73 out of 101 deputies from the Communist Party and Liberal Democratic Party, the office of First Deputy Speaker of the Parliament of Moldova was abolished, and this is what prompted Plahotniuc to resign. In his turn, Plahotniuc urged the prime minister, Vlad Filat, who was later condemned for influence peddling and passive corruption, to follow his lead. At the end of October 2013, Plahotniuc resigned as MP. The motion of no confidence was the reason given in January 2016 by the Moldovan President, Nicolae Timofti, to reject Plahotniuc's candidature for the position of prime minister. Timofti said that "Plahotniuc is not qualified for the Prime-Minister position". He further said that among the qualifications for that position are that "the integrity of the candidate must not give rise to doubt".

In 2014 Plahotniuc told reporters: "I entered politics with my business in place. I wanted to give something back, not the other way round." He is one of the wealthiest people in Moldova, if not the wealthiest one. According to his op-ed, he declares himself to be a huge supporter of EU integration and strengthening relations with the west. In December 2014, Plahotniuc was re-elected as a member of Parliament, and in July 2015 he resigned again from this position "to focus his political activity on reforming the party".

On 15 October 2015, on the day Vlad Filat was detained as part of the ongoing investigation into the 2014 Moldovan bank fraud scandal, Plahotniuc announced via Facebook that he had auto-suspended himself from the position of First Deputy Chairman of the Democratic Party of Moldova, and also from the position of a member of this party "... to avoid insinuations that he influences the investigation in the bank fraud case, and to avoid damaging the image of the party (PDM)".

In early May 2016 Plahotniuc, as an executive coordinator of the Governing Coalition Council, a previously unknown position, was on an official visit to Washington. He attended an event of the Atlantic Council, where he met Victoria Nuland, assistant to the US Secretary of State.

On 24 December 2016, during the 8th Democratic Party Congress, Plahotniuc was elected chairman of the Democratic Party of Moldova. On 6 March 2017, Plahotniuc announced that his party would propose a uninominal voting system. Two months later, on 10 May, he announced the party's position to completely support the Government in its reform of the central administration. In a press briefing, he stated only nine ministries would remain out of the existing sixteen.

In March 2017, at the XXVth congress of the Socialist International, taking place from 2 to 4 March in Cartagena, Colombia, Plahotniuc was elected as deputy president, joining the leadership team of George Papandreou, president, and Luis Ayala, secretary general, who were both re-elected for the next four years.

On 30 March 2017, a majority of the Moldova Parliament, led by the Democrats, approved a draft law modifying the Constitution of Moldova and lifting the immunity of MPs, while the Socialist and Communist MPs criticized the initiative. In 2013, Plahotniuc declared, "Lifting the immunity of deputies is not populism: it is a test that politicians should give to society."

In July 2017, at the Congress of Socialist International, Plahotniuc demanded the withdrawal of Russian troops from eastern Moldova.

In 2018, Plahotniuc urged the government to launch a campaign to promote a housing program named "Prima casă" ("First Home"), designed to facilitate the acquisition of housing for civil servants. At the beginning of 2018, he also announced the launching of a national program "Drumuri bune pentru Moldova" ("Good Roads for Moldova"). Plahotniuc described this project as the biggest infrastructure project since the declaration of Independence, but some experts found the project to be unrealistic.

According to previous opinion polls, Plahotniuc was the lowest rated Moldovan politician, considered by Moldovan citizens to be untrustworthy. In opinion polls carried out in 2019 referring to the most respected politicians of the Republic of Moldova, Vladimir Plahotniuc was ranked 3rd and 5th among politicians in whom Moldovans have the most trust.

In the parliamentary elections on 24 February 2019, Plahotniuc was the candidate of the Democratic Party of Moldova in Nisporeni uninominal constituency no.17, and was elected as an MP.

On 24 June 2019 Plahotniuc resigned as chairman of the Democratic Party of Moldova.

On 30 July 2019 Plahotniuc resigned as MP. Parliament accepted his resignation, and his seat was declared vacant.

=== Parliamentary diplomacy ===
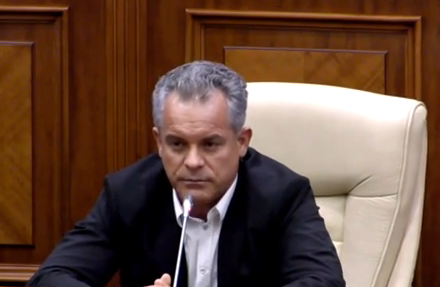
Plahotniuc in 2015

As the first deputy chairman of the Parliament of the Republic of Moldova, Plahotniuc represented the country's interests during official trips and at official meetings with political leaders from other states.

Between 13 and 15 June 2011, Plahotniuc attended the 9th Conference of the presidents of the Parliaments of the member states of the South-East European Cooperation Process (SEECP), of which Moldova has been a member since 2006. He was also part of the Interparliamentary Assembly of Member Nations of the Commonwealth of Independent States (IPA CIS), the Parliamentary Assembly of the Council of Europe, the Friendship Group with the Swiss Confederation, the Friendship Group with the Hellenic Republic and the Friendship Group with the Hungarian Republic.

=== Position on foreign relations ===
In an interview for the Moldovan news website Deschide.md, Plahotniuc stated that "the Republic of Moldova will not cancel or renegotiate the Association Agreement with the EU, and will not sign an Agreement with the Euro-Asiatic Union", qualifying the statements made by Igor Dodon in Moscow as purely electioneering rhetoric. Regarding president Igor Dodon's official visit to Moscow, Plahotniuc committed the Democratic Party to standing firmly for continuing Moldova's commitment to the European Union and maintained that Moldova – EU relations must remain pivotal for the country's foreign policy.

On 7 January 2017, Plahotniuc addressed a message to the U.S. president-elect Donald Trump; the statement reflected the party leader's vision: ″Moldova is willing to become a bridge between East and West, not a battleground for the world powers″.

As chairman of the Democratic Party, Plahotniuc opposed the long-looming prospect of a Russian-annexed Moldova. The party has repeatedly reaffirmed its attachment to Western doctrines such as democracy.

During his presidency of the Democratic Party, Plahotniuc attended many meetings with officials from the US and Europe. One of his achievements in this respect was the submission of pro-Moldovan resolutions in the US House of Representatives by Congressmen David Price and Pete Olson after having several meetings with them. The resolutions reiterated US support for the territorial integrity of Moldova and for the resolution of the Transnistria conflict, and called for enhanced cooperation between Moldova and the US.

=== Position on Russian interference in Moldova ===
Plahotniuc has declared many times that one of his main goals is to stop Russian interference in Moldova, which had spread to all spheres of the Moldovan economy such as media, the banking system, insurance, NGOs and political organisations. To minimize Russian influence over the region, Plahotniuc, together with the government coalition, pioneered many reforms and laws such as anti-propaganda law, financial reforms based on EU directives and the reform of NGOs.

In response to laws that aimed to reduce its influence over the regions, Russia started to frame Moldovan officials, including Plahotniuc, with bogus legal cases, ratcheting up a long-running diplomatic row between the two countries. According to Moldovan officials, these actions were due to ongoing investigations into the case known locally as the "Russian Laundromat". Plahotniuc declared that Russia's behavior "toward my colleagues and me is an explicit act of blackmail and political harassment ... abusive and illegal behavior, which will not change our commitment to the democratic and European development of Moldova.

On 22 February 2019, the Ministry of Internal Affairs of the Russian Federation accused Vladimir Plahotniuc of money laundering. According to Plahotniuc's own political party, the Democratic Party, "This was abusive interference by the Russian Federation in the elections in the Republic of Moldova. And this so-called case was opened by Russians against the DP's leader, just two days before the parliamentary elections in Moldova, which is clearly abuse on the part of the Russian Federation by which they try to influence the election outcomes in Moldova".

On 26 June 2019, two days after Plahotniuc resigned as chairperson of the PDM, he was arraigned, in his absence, in the Russian Federation for organizing a large criminal drug trafficking network in North Africa, through the European Union, to CIS countries, including the Russian Federation. The former PD leader wrote that these were some of the "threats" addressed to him and his family: "The Russian Federation has several criminal cases against me, I do not know the exact number. I have learned about each of them from the press. They appeared either during elections or when the Republic of Moldova, governed by the Democratic Party, made decisions that were not to Moscow's liking. All these cases are fantasies and attempts to involve my name in cases that have absolutely nothing to do with me. It is precisely for reasons of political harassment that Interpol rejected tens of Russia's attempts to limit my freedom of movement abusively."

According to International Security and Estonia 2020, a report published by the Estonian secret services, at the end of 2017 the FSB Directorate for Support Program decided to carry out an influence operation against Plahotniuc, with the aim of spreading information on Plahotniuc's criminal image and his alleged opposition to European integration, hoping to discourage the West from cooperating with him. The Kremlin was concerned about Plahotniuc's influence as such, and not about the mechanisms and approaches he was implementing. His influence prevented Russia from achieving its own goals in Moldova and, consequently, from expanding Russian influence.

== Businessman ==
Plahotniuc ran companies in the following domains: oil, financial and banking, hotels, media and real estate. In August 2010, the Ukrainian business magazine "Delo" estimated Plahotniuc's wealth to be 300 million dollars. Money originated from both "Victoriabank" and "Petrom Moldova" activity, where he acted as deputy chairman of the board of directors and then general director.

Plahotniuc acted as the chairman of Victoriabank, one of the leading banks in Moldova until January 2011. In 2004–2007 Plahotniuc was the unofficial business partner with Viorel and Victor Țopa, together with whom he gained control over Victoriabank and Prime TV channel. In September 2010, Victor and Viorel Țopa addressed a memorandum to a number of national and international institutions (17), accusing Plahotniuc of "raider attacks" of July–August 2011 on 4 banks and the ASITO assurance company. The ex-president of Victoriabank, Victor Țurcan, affirmed later in an interview that the real crooks in the Victoriabank case are Victor and Viorel Țopa, and that they manipulated public opinion through false statements. Later, a criminal case was opened against each of the Țopas, and they fled to Germany, accusing Plahotniuc of political persecution. On 8 March 2017 Plahotniuc published on his Facebook page the Amsterdam Court's decision confirming that Țopa's accusations about the Victoriabank "raider attack" are unfounded.

Plahotniuc is sole owner of the company "Prime Management SRL", which was founded in September 2010 and has earned him revenues of 34 million lei (cca 7.8 million euro) as of 2015.

Plahotniuc has founded two companies: General Media Group Corp and Radio Media Group Inc., which incorporated four TV channels: Publika TV, Prime TV, Canal 2 and Canal 3 and 3 radio stations – Publika FM, Muz FM and Maestro FM. Then, two TV channels – Canal 2 and Canal 3 – owned by General Media Group Corp have passed into the possession of Telestar Media. The democratic leader officially owns two TV channels – Prime and Publika TV – and two radio stations – Muz FM and Publika FM.

=== Moldova Business People Association ===
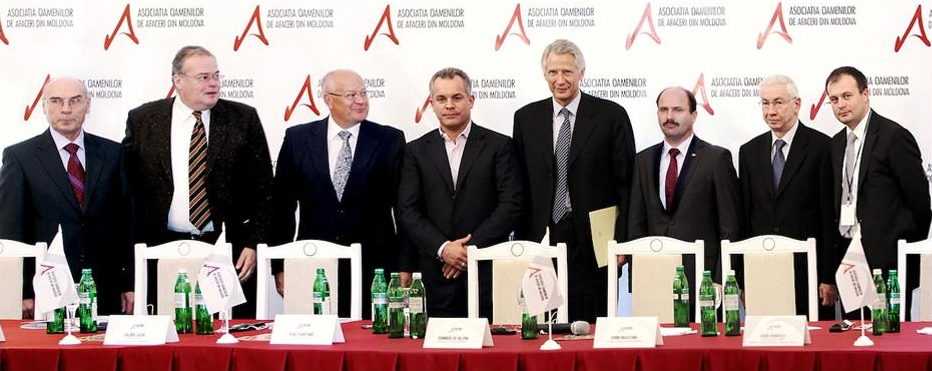
The launch of the Moldova Business People Association

Before entering politics with the Democratic Party of Moldova, on 26 July 2010, Plahotniuc founded the Moldova Business People Association, and he remains the association's president and in two months it launched its activity with an international economic summit, which had Dominique de Villepin, French politician and writer, former minister of foreign affairs in the French Government, as a guest speaker of the event. The list of participants included Vladimir Plahotniuc, the chairman of MBPA board; Andrian Candu – General Director of MBPA; Valeriu Lazăr – Deputy Prime-Minister, Ministry of Economy and Commerce; Dorin Drăguțanu – Governor of the National Bank of Moldova, and many other honorable guests.

In 2016, the AOAM's grants program was launched to support young entrepreneurs. Each grant is for an amount of 50,000 lei.

On Plahotniuc's initiative, the Moldova Business People Association launched a collaboration with the Academy of Sciences of Moldova, taking into account that research needs support from the business environment. On 25 October 2010, during a festive event, the Moldova Business People Association handed out diplomas to the top 100 managers from Moldova.

== Charity activity ==
Plahotniuc is founder of The Foundation of Vlad Plahotniuc "EDELWEISS", which is involved in implementing various social projects in Moldova. Founded in 2010, the foundation implemented many cultural projects, book donations, music concerts and artistic events, supported Moldovan sportsmen, provided financial support for people in need of medical care, Thus, flood victims of the summer 2010 Prut River overflowing received financial aid and goods. People in need from all around the country benefited from the same type of assistance and support. Edelweiss refurbished the dormitory building of the "Gracious Joseph" Orphanage and donated them various gifts.

In 2014, Edelweiss started a national scale social campaign called "Revive Moldova". Initiated to support and encourage mothers of newborn babies by offering bespoke presents, including childcare and other important things that mothers may need. The campaign was launched in July 2016 at the Mother and Child Institute in Chișinău and extended in 2017 to three other maternities in the country: Maternity Hospital Nisporeni, Cahul and Edineț. The campaign soon reached its goal: to collect 1 million euros for the reconstruction works and modern medical equipment of the Institute of Mother and Child in Chișinău.

Edelweiss has also allocated resources to development of children playgrounds and invested a lot in rural localities. Under the Edelweiss Parks project, over 40 safe and modern playgrounds for children from different localities of the country were built.

In 2017, Edelweiss started the project "Respect for Seniors" in partnership with the Austrian Embassy and the "Neoumanist" Education Association. The project aims to improve the living standards of 40 elderly people in Strășeni district by providing social and medical services at home.

In 2017, the foundation initiated a project addressed to high school students in the Republic of Moldova to support the enrichment of the educational environment and to encourage students by offering 100 monthly scholarships during the study year 2017–2018.

In 2016 the foundation was officially renamed to Fundația lui Vlad Plahotniuc "EDELWEISS" (The Foundation of Vlad Plahotniuc "EDELWEISS").

The campaign "A new life" continued in 2018 at the Mother and Child Institute in Chișinău, at the maternity hospitals in Nisporeni, Cahul and Edineț and extends in the other 20 maternities in the country: Bălți, Cantemir, Călărași, Căușeni, Cimișlia, Criuleni, Ceadîr–Lunga, Drochia, Fălești, Florești, Hîncești, Ialoveni, Rezina, Rîșcani, Sîngerei, Soroca, Strășeni, Șoldănești, Ștefan Vodă, Ungheni, with over 12,400 beneficiaries of boxes for newborns.

== Attempted assassination ==
On 7 April 2017, Serhiy Knyazev of the National Police of Ukraine and Arsen Avakov of the Ministry of Internal Affairs of Ukraine announced an attempt had been made on Plahotniuc's life. Authorities detained eight people in Moldova and nine in Ukraine. The investigators found the assassins had links to Russian Federation special forces. On 8 April, according to a press release of State Border Guard Service of Ukraine, the attempted murder was coordinated by people from the Russian intelligence services. The same day, in a common press statement of Moldovan police and prosecutors, it was stated that the crime was commanded by two citizens of Moldova, one of them being a head of a criminal group, based in Russia. However, some political analysts stated at an opposition channel Jurnal TV, that these events are part of a hybrid war. On 27 April 2017, Moldovan prosecutors stated in a press conference, that the interlope Grigore Caramalac (also spelled Karamalak; alias "Bulgaru") is one of the persons who ordered the murder of Plahotniuc. The second individual would be a detainee in a Moldovan prison. Six defendants on Vladimir Plahotniuc's assassination attempt file have been convicted by the first instance.

== Legal issues and controversies ==
=== The Gorbuntsov case and arrest in absentia ===
Plahotniuc has been accused by a hired assassin of being behind the order to kill German Gorbuntsov. Plahotniuc had long been suspected of being linked to the "organization of the murder attempt on banker German Gorbuntsov." The latter rejects the information issued by the murderer Vitalie Proca and claims that Renato Usatîi is the one who wants his death, and Plahotniuc would have no reason to order his assassination. Finally, Moldovan media were divided into two camps, and both camps have their own version of the case. As reaction, on 30 November 2017 a Moscow court has issued an arrest warrant for Plahotniuc, charged with attempted murder and was placed on the Russia's international wanted list of criminals. Russian authorities submitted a request to INTERPOL for Plahotniuc to be placed on an international search list. The request was rejected by INTERPOL, saying that it cannot intervene in what are essentially political disputes between member states. The General Prosecutor's Office in Moldova announced on Monday evening that it plans to seize overseas property belonging to Vlad Plahotniuc. The General Prosecutor's Office issued a statement saying, "This is about the accused's villas in Switzerland, France and Romania, and five cars and a boat (registered in Switzerland). Also, nine apartments registered in the name of his wife, as well as four vehicles in Moldova, are to be seized".

=== The century theft ===
In September 2016, Plahotniuc's name was circulated as being the beneficiary of the "century theft" from the Moldovan banking sector. Kroll International Company in its investigation has called Ilan Shor, the businessman with Moldova-Israeli citizenship, the key organizer and final beneficiary of this theft. The former prime minister, Vlad Filat, the mayor of the Orhei town, Ilan Shor, and the controversial businessman Veaceslav Platon have been convicted within this case.

The New York Times has called Plahotniuc Moldova's "Most Feared Tycoon". In the Carnegie Report, "The Structure of Corruption in Moldova," Plahotniuc is referred to as controlling Moldova's network outside of the government and that a central-bank-commissioned report detailing a suspicious transfer of around $1 billion was "seen as a move by the Plahotniuc network to disable its lone competitor, the network around former prime minister Vladimir Filat.

After the events of June 2019, the fall of the DPM government and Plahotniuc's departure from the country, criminal prosecution actions against him, incriminating his involvement in the bank robbery has followed.

In October 2019, Vlad Plahotniuc was announced in an international and interstate search, the request to be searched on Interpol channels for the arrest and extradition of the accused, being sent to the General Secretariat of the Interpol ICPO.

On 23 July 2020, the File Control Commission of the ICPO Interpol General Secretariat informed the General Prosecutor's Office of the Republic of Moldova about the refusal to include the former DPM leader Vladimir Plahotniuc in the list of people announced in the international search and decided to delete his data from the databases of the organization.

In May 2023 the Chișinău Court of Appeal ruled that Plahotniuc must stand trial in his absence for theft from the Moldovan banking system between 2012 and 2014 including creating and leading a criminal organisation, fraud and money laundering. Prosecutors have already seized about one billion Moldovan lei (€50 million) of Plahotniuc’s assets in Moldova.

=== Alleged properties ===
Despite the fact that his name is not mentioned in the founding documents, there is a rumor that Vlad Plahotniuc is the owner of the most luxurious hotel in Chișinău – "Nobil". It was also said that he owns "Codru" hotel and "Asito" Insurance Company, "Drive" Night Club from Moldova. Moldova Agroindbank is the Codru hotel's current owner, and it announced that the hotel will become the bank's headquarter.

=== Criticism and allegations ===
In June 2015, former prime minister of Moldova Ion Sturza, stated in a TV talk-show that "[...] Republic of Moldova is a captured state, and it is controlled by Plahotniuc [...]". In October 2015 Petru Bogatu, a Moldovan op-ed columnist, wrote hard criticism in Plahotniuc's address, stating that he [Plahotniuc] "has usurped the central country's administration", and "has subordinate to him prosecutors and judges, subjugating this way country's constitutional institutions. As a result, he transformed the state into a private firm, and the justice – into a gestapo for the intimidation and burial of his political opponents." Several media sources have called him oligarch. The former prime minister, Vlad Filat, has called him "The puppeteer" (Romanian: Păpușarul) being accused for traffic of influence over all Moldovan political class. He constantly draws criticism from Moldovan analysts, NGOs, and columnists, such as journalist Natalia Morari, who called out Plahotniuc for being "pro-Plahotniuc and pro-corruption".

On 21 September 2017, Maia Sandu, the chairperson of the Party of Action and Solidarity, submitted to the Office of the Prosecutor General of the Republic of Moldova a criminal denunciation on Vladimir Plahotniuc, accusing him in usurpation of state power through the seizure of all state government powers through blackmail and corruption. On 11 October 2017, Mihai Ghimpu, the chairperson of the Liberal Party, has reassumed at the Parliamentary Assembly of the Council of Europe some of these accusations and has complained on the fact that Plahotniuc controls the justice in Moldova and abusing this is intimidating political opponents. Ghimpu's statements come as a reaction to the arrest of Chișinău mayor Dorin Chirtoaca (25 May 2017), to whom was incriminated an act of corruption, traffic of influence and excess of official authority in the case of Toll Parking in Chișinău, as well as the arrest of the Minister of Transport and Road Infrastructure, Iurie Chirinciuc (28 April 2017), the case regarding it contains 3 incriminations: passive corruption, abuse of official position and illegal extraction of mineral resources.

On 22 April 2026, Plahotniuc was sentenced to 19 years' imprisonment for embezzlement.

=== Sanctions ===
On 13 January 2020, US Secretary of State, Mike Pompeo, announced that Vladimir Plahotniuc and his family members are declared personae non-gratae in the US. Sanctioned by the United States Department of State on 13 January 2020 and the United States Department of Treasury('s Office of Foreign Assets Control as a Specially Designated National under GLOMAG) on 26 October 2022 over multiple acts of corruption committed by him. On 11 July 2020 Plahotniuc has contested legally this decision at a New York court.

On 16 June 2020, the General Prosecutor of Moldova, Alexandr Stoianoglo, asked the US authorities for the extradition of Plahotniuc to Moldova. According to political analyst Vladislav Kulminski, director of the Institute of Strategic Initiatives, "the request of the Moldovan Prosecutor's Office was issued on the basis of an inapplicable agreement, and this proves to some extent its political, but not legal, origin." At the same time, he states that "extradition from the USA is possible only if there is a bilateral extradition agreement, which clearly stipulates the crimes for which a person can be extradited. There is no such agreement between Moldova and the USA".

On 31 May 2023, European Union imposed sanctions against him, due to his association with the Russian government and because of his role in the pro-Russian unrest in Moldova.

As of March 2023, Plahotniuc's location is unknown, but most rumours claim that he currently resides in Northern Cyprus. Moldovan politician Renato Usatîi also claimed that Plahotniuc spends time in both Istanbul and Northern Cyprus.

On 22 July 2025, Plahotniuc was arrested in Greece. He was extradited to Moldova on 25 September.

In 2025, Romanian businessman Adrian Porumboiu, who previously had ties to Plahotniuc, declared that he was an SIE general and that he was close to Victor Ponta and Daniel Constantin.

== Personal life ==
Plahotniuc is married to Oxana (née Childescu) with whom he has two sons. His wife, Oxana, is the daughter of the Moldovan painter and sculptor Emil Childescu.

=== Multiple identity ===
At the beginning of 2011, shortly after his election to Parliament, Romanian newspaper Adevărul unveiled the fact that Plahotniuc has Romanian citizenship, being registered under the name of Vlad Ulinici, and previously as Vladimir Ulinici. He explained this fact by "wanting to protect his children against discrimination during their studies in Romania". Later, he announced that he had requested that his name be changed to Plahotniuc in his Romanian documents as well. For the use of the false identity Plahotniuc faced criminal prosecution in Romania three years after his double Ulinici/Plahotniuc identity was revealed in Adevărul Moldova. The prosecutor dismissed the criminal case because in the Republic of Moldova using a false identity is not a crime.

In December 2019, it was found out that Vlad Plahotniuc has one more identity on the territory of the Republic of Moldova with the name of Vladislav Novak. The document, according to President Igor Dodon, was issued by the Public Services Agency at the request of the Information and Security Service of the Republic of Moldova.

Plahotniuc has at least six aliases and passports from Romania, Ukraine, Bulgaria, Russia, Iraq, and Vanuatu.

== Honours ==
By Decree no. 1298 of the president of the Republic of Moldova of 29 August 2007 regarding the granting of state distinctions "for the contribution to the reconstruction of the Curchi Monastery and the merits for the preservation and propagation of the historical-cultural heritage" was awarded with the Order "Gloria Muncii".

On 24 July 2014, Vlad Plahotniuc was awarded with the highest distinction in Moldova, the Order of the Republic, by president of the Republic of Moldova Nicolae Timofti "for major contributions to attaining foreign policy goals set by the Moldovan government – political association and economic integration with European Union". He was stripped of the distinction on 18 February 2021 by the president Maia Sandu.
