= European Endowment for Democracy =

European non-governmental organisation

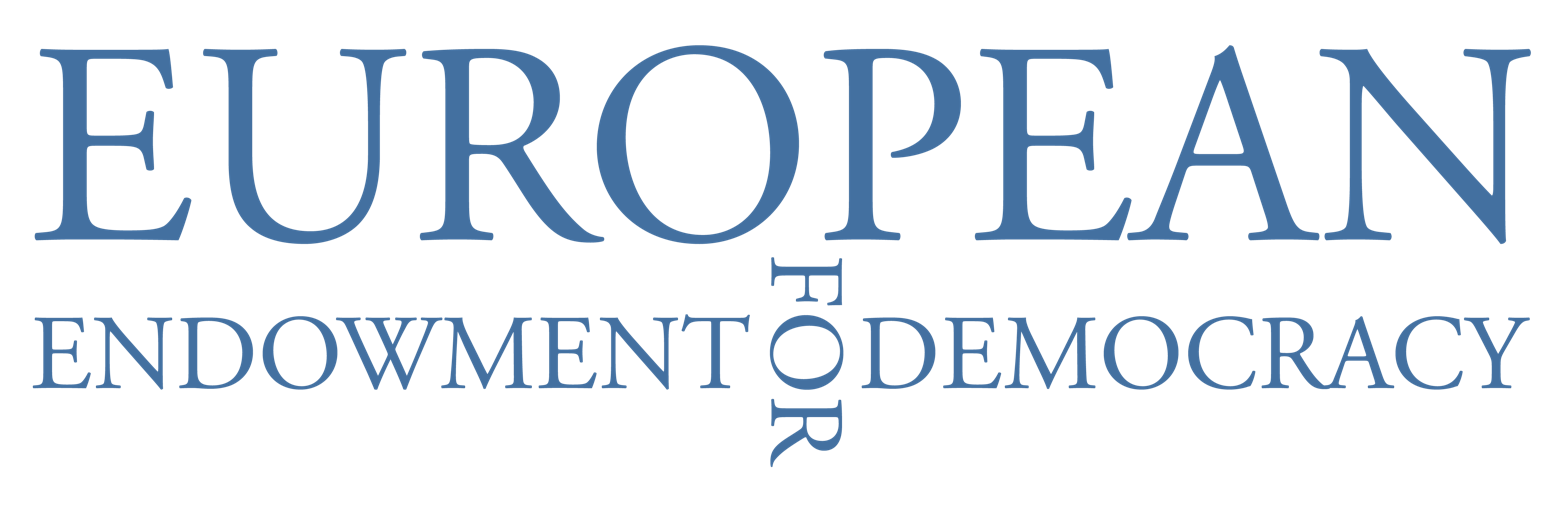
- Abbreviation: EED
- Founded: 2013
- Type: NGO
- Location: Brussels, Belgium
- Origins: Declaration on the Establishment of a European Endowment for Democracy
- Region served: Europe; Worldwide
- Key people: Jerzy Pomianowski - Executive Director, David McAllister - Chairperson of Board of Governors
- Website: www.democracyendowment.eu

The European Endowment for Democracy (EED) is a European non-governmental organisation with the stated purpose of promoting democracy, particularly in the European Neighbourhood, Turkey and the Western Balkans. It was established in 2013 following a proposal by the Polish Presidency of the European Council, and receives funding from the European Commission and twenty-three European countries.

In March 2020, the foundation was labeled as an 'undesirable organization' in Russia.

In January 2013, Jerzy Pomianowski, Deputy State Secretary at the Polish Ministry of Foreign Affairs, was elected as Founding Director. The Foundation is led by David McAllister (Board of Governors) and Lisbeth Pilegaard (Executive Committee).

== See also ==
- National Endowment for Democracy
