= 2020 Moldovan presidential election =

- 1 November 2020 (first round); 15 November 2020 (second round)
- Turnout: 45.68% (first round) ▼3.50pp 52.76% (second round) ▼0.69pp
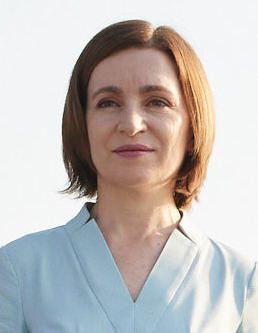

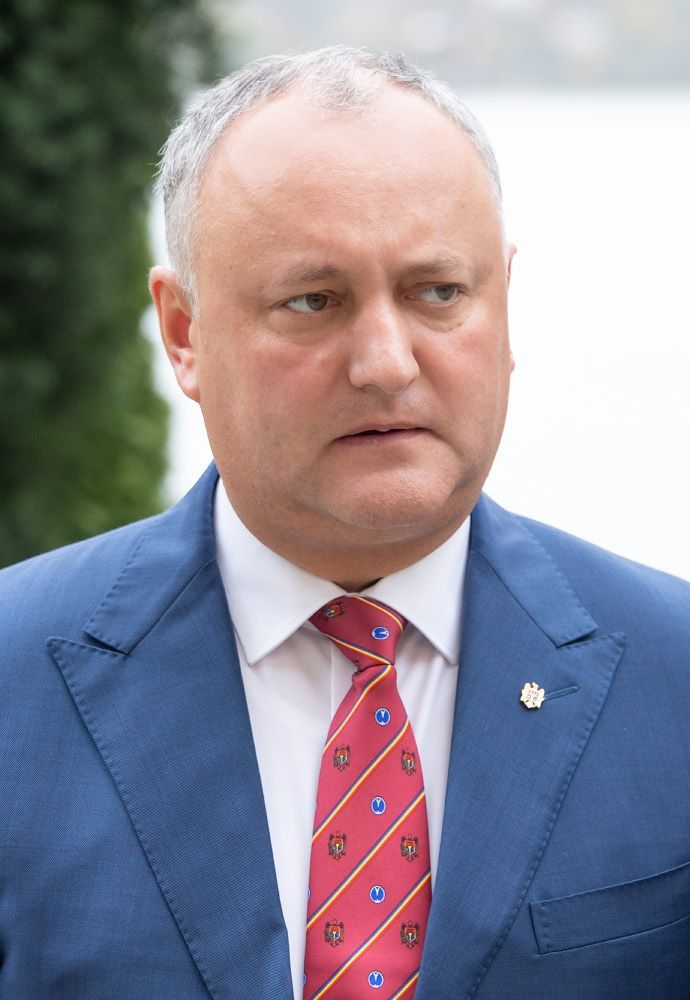
| Candidate | Maia Sandu | Igor Dodon |
| Party | PAS | Independent (PSRM) (Note: The President of Moldova traditionally resigns from party membership after taking office. Although Dodon was officially an independent, his campaign was endorsed and funded by Party of Socialists of the Republic of Moldova.) |
| Popular vote | 943,006 | 690,615 |
| Percentage | 57.72% | 42.28% |
- Second round results by electoral district Sandu: 50–55% 55–60% 60–65% 65–70% 70–75% 80–85% 90–95% Dodon: 50–55% 55–60% 60–65% 65–70% 70–75% 80–85% 85–90% 90–95%
President before election
Igor Dodon
Independent
Elected President
Maia Sandu
PAS

Presidential elections were held in Moldova on 1 November. The fourth direct elections since independence in 1991, voters had the possibility to either elect a new president or re-elect the incumbent Igor Dodon. Because no candidate received a majority of votes in the first round, a run-off between the top two candidates, Maia Sandu and Dodon, was held on 15 November. Maia Sandu won the second round with 58% of the vote, becoming the first female President of the country and the first winner from the Party of Action and Solidarity (PAS). Conversely, Igor Dodon became the second president after Mircea Snegur in 1996 to lose a re-election bid.

== Electoral system ==
=== Eligibility requirements ===
The Constitution of Moldova (Article 78, Clause 2) defines four conditions that a presidential candidate must satisfy: Moldovan citizenship, at least 40 years of age, residence in Moldova for at least 10 years, and ability to speak the state language. Article 80 of the Constitution establishes a term limit: one individual cannot serve more than 2 terms in a row.

=== Procedure ===
Candidates can be nominated by a political party, an electoral alliance, or run as independents. They have to collect at least 15,000 voter signatures in their support from at least half of Moldova's level 2 administrative territorial units with at least 600 signatures in each of them. The election results can be considered valid only if the turnout is above or equal to 33%. The candidate who receives an absolute majority of the votes is elected president. If no candidate receives a majority of the votes, a second round between the top 2 candidates is held two weeks after the first round. The candidate with the largest number of votes in the second round then becomes president.

== Candidates ==
| Candidate | Current office held | Nominating party/coalition | Status |
|---|---|---|---|
| Igor Dodon | Incumbent President of Moldova | Independent, supported by the Party of Socialists of the Republic of Moldova (PSRM) | Registered |
| Maia Sandu | Leader of PAS | Party of Action and Solidarity (PAS), supported by Pro Moldova | Registered |
| Andrei Năstase | Member of the Chișinău Municipal Council; Leader of PPDA | Dignity and Truth Platform Party (PPDA), supported by Constantin Oboroc | Registered |
| Dorin Chirtoacă | Member of the Chișinău Municipal Council; Leader of PL | Union Political Movement, formed by: Democracy at Home Party (PDA); Liberal Party (PL); National Liberal Party (PNL); Romanian Popular Party (PPR); Save Bessarabia Union (USB) | Registered |
| Octavian Țîcu | Member of Parliament; Leader of PUN | National Unity Party (PUN) | Registered |
| Renato Usatîi | Mayor of Bălți; Leader of PN | Our Party (PN) | Registered |
| Tudor Deliu | Ex-Leader of PLDM | Liberal Democratic Party of Moldova (PLDM) | Registered |
| Violeta Ivanov | Member of Parliament | Șor Party (PPȘ) | Registered |
| Andrian Candu | Member of Parliament; Leader of PPM | Pro Moldova Party (PPM) | Registration denied by CEC |
| Ion Costaș | 1st Minister of Internal Affairs of Moldova | Independent | Candidacy withdrawn |
| Alexandr Kalinin | Leader of PRM | Party of Regions of Moldova (PRM) | Candidacy withdrawn |
| Constantin Oboroc | Ex-First Deputy Prime Minister of Moldova | Independent | Registration failed |
| Serghei Toma | Leader of POM | Working People's Party (POM) | Registration failed |

== Campaign ==
The electoral campaign for the first round started on 2 October 2020 and ended on 30 October 2020. The electoral campaign for the second round started on 2 November and ended on 13 November 2020.

=== First round ===
==== Igor Dodon ====
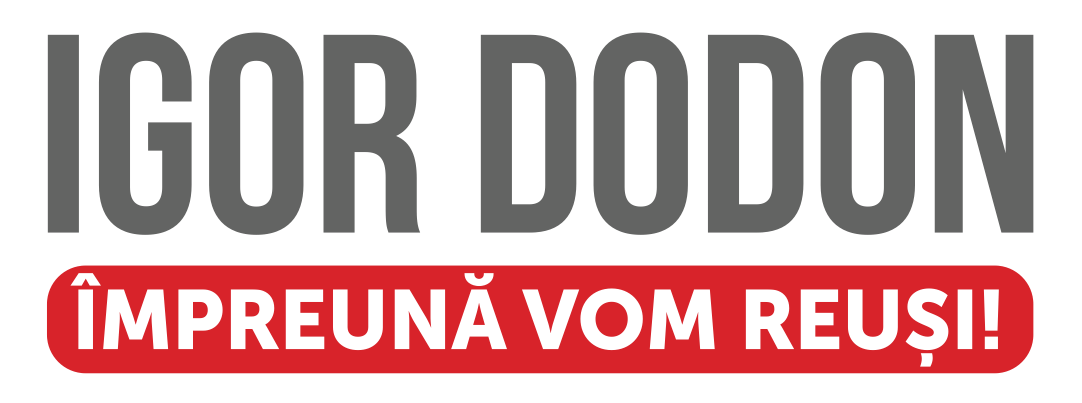
Logo of Dodon's campaign

Igor Dodon announced that he intended to run for reelection as an independent candidate on 9 September 2020. His stated reason for running as such was that, according to Moldovan law, the president cannot be a member of a political party. Dodon thought that running as a party's candidate could open the way for his opponents to contest the legitimacy of his participation at the constitutional court.

On 21 September 2020, he presented the necessary signatures supporting him for registration to Central Election Commission of Moldova (CEC). The CEC declared that he would be listed fourth on the ballot if registered. Igor Dodon formally launched his campaign on 2 October 2020. Shortly after doing this, he announced that he was not going to make use of billboards and that he would not, at least in the first round, take part in any debates. On 6 October 2020, the Party of Socialists of the Republic of Moldova (PSRM) officially endorsed Dodon's candidacy. Widely regarded as the most pro-Russian candidate on the ballot, Dodon advocated to codify into law the role of the Russian language, make studying Russian compulsory in schools and strengthening strategic partnership with Russia. Other key pillars of his campaign were preserving Moldova's territorial sovereignty, strengthening the social security system and promoting Christian and family values.

After announcing the official end of his campaign for the first round on 30 October, Dodon stated that he had organized more than 240 meetings with voters in hundreds of cities and villages which allowed him to meet more than 45,000 people.

==== Maia Sandu ====
Logo of Sandu's campaign

Maia Sandu announced her candidacy for the 2020 presidential election on 18 July 2020. She was nominated by the Party of Action and Solidarity (PAS) as a result of a decision made by the National Political Council of the party. After running as a joint candidate of DA and PAS in 2016, she stated that in 2020, a joint pro-European candidate would not be needed as there was not a risk of there being no pro-European candidates in the second round of the election. On 23 September, Sandu announced that her team managed to collect 30,000 signatures in her favor, out of which only 25,000 (the maximum number allowed) were presented to the CEC. After registering Sandu's candidacy, CEC announced that she would be listed sixth on the ballot.

On 2 October 2020, Sandu officially launched her campaign. During her campaign launch event, Sandu held 2 speeches, one in Romanian and one in Russian, promising to fight corruption, poverty and to reform the criminal justice system. Other priorities of her campaign were reducing unemployment, raising the minimum pension to 2,000 lei (around 114 USD) and building closer ties with the European Union. Sandu's campaign accused her main opponent, the incumbent president Dodon, of deliberately hindering criminal justice system reform, poor management of the COVID-19 pandemic and its economic impact, usage of administrative resources in his campaign and attempts to rig the election. Sandu tried multiple times to organize a debate with Dodon, which the latter refused to attend.

On 30 October 2020, Sandu officially announced the end of her campaign for the first round, saying that she managed to visit all of Moldova's districts and organize over 300 meetings with voters.

==== Renato Usatîi ====
Logo of Usatîi's campaign

On 27 July 2020, Renato Usatîi announced that he wanted the people to decide whether he should run for president in 2020. During a press conference, he asked people to record short videos in which they would express their views on his potential candidacy and send them to him before 27 August 2020. On 26 August 2020, Usatîi posted a YouTube compilation video with people expressing support for his candidacy and claimed that tens of thousands of people asked him to run for president. The next day, Usatîi organized an open air press conference during which he officially announced his candidacy for the 2020 elections.

On 7 September 2020, Usatîi was the second candidate to submit the necessary signatures supporting him to the CEC. Later, it was announced that he would be listed first on the ballot. Usatîi's campaign officially started on 2 October 2020. During his campaign launch event, he promised to serve and represent the people, fight corruption and nepotism and solve all issues faced by voters. During his campaign, Usatîi emerged as a very fierce critic of the incumbent president Dodon. Usatîi accused him of spending a week in a luxury resort financed by taxpayer money, fabricating opinion polls, illegally spying on his campaign and attempting to rig the election by paying Moldovan citizens from Transnistria to vote for him. He also organized events to protest against Dodon and promised to prosecute him if elected. Dodon refused to address Usatîi's accusations and declared that he wanted to focus instead on concrete policies.

Widely considered a populist candidate, Usatîi declared that if elected, he would organize snap parliamentary elections, eradicate corruption by forming a Moldovan equivalent of Mossad, abolish district authorities and intensify economic cooperation with Romania and Ukraine. Usatîi organized multiple meetings with voters and participated in two televised debates.

Usatîi officially announced the end of his campaign for the first round on 30 October 2020.

After his elimination in the first round, Usatîi advised his supporters to vote against Dodon in the second round but did not specifically endorse Sandu.

==== Violeta Ivanov ====
In May 2020, Violeta Ivanov left the Democratic Party of Moldova and joined the Șor Party. Shortly after, she became the vice-president of the Șor Party's parliamentary faction.

In August 2020, several media outlets speculated that Ivanov was going to participate in the presidential election. This was confirmed on 6 September 2020, when Ilan Shor announced that Ivanov was the party's candidate for presidency. Ivanov officially started her campaign on 2 October 2020. Her campaign prioritized regional development, improvements in agriculture, strengthening the social security and healthcare systems and fighting corruption. During the campaign, several members of the Pro Moldova parliamentary group endorsed Ivanov.

After the first round concluded, Sandu accused the Șor Party of indirectly bribing voters through their network of social stores. Shor rejected Sandu's accusations and said that his actions should be seen not as bribing but as "investments on the people".

After Ivanov's elimination in the first round, Ilan Shor advised the Șor Party's voters to vote for the candidate that would support the party's program and did not explicitly endorse any of the candidates in the second round.

==== Andrei Năstase ====
At the start of 2020, Andrei Năstase promoted the idea of there being a joint pro-European candidate for the 2020 elections, a candidate who was not a member of any political party and would be supported by all the right-wing and unionist parties of Moldova. After the negotiations for a joint candidate failed, Năstase announced on 2 March 2020 that he would participate in the presidential elections.

On 3 October 2020, Năstase officially started his campaign. It focused on eradicating corruption, reforming the judiciary, raising the minimum pension to 2500 lei (around 143 USD), improving Moldova's international credibility, building closer ties with the European Union, promoting family values and preserving national culture. Throughout his campaign, Năstase emphasized that, according to opinion polls, he was the only one able to beat incumbent President Dodon in a potential runoff and that Sandu would lose in the second round in the same way she did in the 2016 elections. On 15 October, Năstase publicly asked Sandu to withdraw her candidacy and endorse him for president. Sandu refused his proposal saying that the candidate with the most votes in the first round should be the one facing Dodon in the runoff.

After being eliminated in the first round, Năstase announced his unconditional support for Maia Sandu in the second round.

==== Tudor Deliu ====
Deliu, a parliamentarian from the Liberal Democratic Party of Moldova, launched his candidacy from his home village of Malcoci at the beginning of October. He espoused separation of powers, emphasizing the need to reduce corruption in the judiciary. He also promised to defend human rights of all citizens, including minorities, and to sign a trade agreement with the European Union.

==== Octavian Țîcu ====
Octavian Țîcu announced that he intended to participate in the presidential elections in October 2019. On 25 July 2020, the Republican Political Council of the National Unity Party officially nominated Țîcu as the party's candidate for the presidency. On 3 October 2020, Țîcu announced that he was denied registration by the CEC and accused incumbent president Dodon of being the man behind the CEC's decision. Two days later, the CEC revised its decision and registered Țîcu as a candidate.

Țîcu officially launched his campaign on 7 October 2020. His program underlined five main priorities: snap parliamentary elections, ending the international isolation of Moldova, reunification of Moldova's infrastructure with that of Romania, adapting Moldova's education system to Romanian standards and forming a unified security system with Romania and NATO.

Țîcu endorsed Maia Sandu in the second round.

==== Dorin Chirtoacă ====
In June 2020, the Union Political Movement (MPU) promoted the idea of a joint unionist candidate for the 2020 elections. Its proposal was mainly aimed at the National Unity Party, an also unionist party that planned on participating in the presidential elections. After it became clear that the negotiations would most likely fail, the MPU nominated Dorin Chirtoacă for the presidency but emphasized that they were still open to the idea of there being a joint candidate.

On 29 September 2020, Chirtoacă submitted the necessary signatures in his support to the CEC and sharply criticized the fact that the signature collection requirement was kept in place during the COVID-19 pandemic. After initially invalidating a large portion of the signatures Chirtoacă presented, which could have resulted in him being denied registration, the CEC revised its decision and registered him as a candidate on 5 October 2020.

Chirtoacă officially launched his campaign on 10 October 2020. Being one of the explicitly unionist candidates, Chirtoacă's campaign rested on the advantages of a potential unification of Moldova and Romania including higher wages, pensions and subsidies in agriculture, improvements in healthcare, reductions in unemployment, decentralization, regional development and increased security provided by NATO. During his campaign, Chirtoacă repeatedly accused incumbent president Dodon of cooperating with the Federal Security Service of the Russian Federation, sharing secret documents with Russian security agencies and being financed by Russia.

Chirtoacă endorsed Maia Sandu in the second round.

=== Second round ===
==== Igor Dodon ====
On 3 November, during the second round of the electoral campaign, while Dodon was talking about Sandu, he modified a proverb and said nu schimbați porumbelul din mână pe coțofana de pe gard, meaning "do not change the pigeon on your hand by the magpie on the fence" and referring to himself as the "pigeon". Many memes were spread on Moldovan social media based on this statement of Dodon. After this, Moldovan citizens opposing Dodon, including members of the diaspora who were attacked by him earlier, started calling him a porumbel ("pigeon"). Sandu responded to this the next day by declaring that "an injured pigeon came out to the press and began to chant songs of mourning", later uploading a video on her TikTok account feeding pigeons and saying that "they are not at fault".

==== Maia Sandu ====
Sandu's entry to the second round set up a rematch of the 2016 Moldovan presidential election, where Dodon defeated Sandu by less than 5 percent. Mindful of this result, Sandu warned supporters about "potential for foreign interference and fraud to affect the outcome".

== Debates ==
According to Central Election Commission regulations, organizers had to ensure equal access to the debates for all candidates and conduct them in a fair and impartial manner. Five TV channels organized debates: Moldova 1, ProTV Chișinău, Jurnal TV, TVR Moldova and TV8. Because of the COVID-19 pandemic, at most three candidates were simultaneously present at each debate.

Televised debates
| Dates | Organizer(s) | Moderator(s) | Number of debates organized | Reference |
|---|---|---|---|---|
| 19.10.2020 - 28.10.2020 | Moldova 1 \ Promo-LEX | Oxana Mititelu, Pavel Postica | 8 | |
| 19.10.2020 - 29.10.2020 | ProTV Chișinău | Lorena Bogza | 8 | |
| 07.10.2020 - 30.10.2020 | TVR Moldova | Mihai Rădulescu | 17 | |
| 26.10.2020 - 29.10.2020 | TV8 | Mariana Rață | 4 | |
| 26.10.2020 | Jurnal TV | Dumitru Mișin | 2 | |

== Opinion polls ==
=== First round ===
| Date | Source | Sample size | Igor Dodon PSRM | Maia Sandu PAS | Renato Usatîi PN | Ilan Șor ȘOR | Andrei Năstase PPDA | Pavel Filip PDM | Other | None of the above | Undecided |
|---|---|---|---|---|---|---|---|---|---|---|---|
| 16/07-23 August 2020 | IRI poll | 2,017 | 18% | 20% | 7% | 1% | 3% | 3% | 12% | TBD | 23% |
| 5-20 August 2020 | ASDM poll | 1,191 | 43% | 27% | 7% | TBD | TBD | TBD | TBD | TBD | TBD |
| 14-26 July 2020 | iData | 1,214 | 19.4% | 15.2% | 4.2% | 3.9% | 2.5% | 2.4% | 6.1% | 35.4% | 10.9% |
| 14-24 July 2020 | ASDM | 1,175 | 34.5% | 19.1% | 5.1% | —N/a | 7.5% | 4.3% | 4.3% | 21.1% | 4.1% |
| 2-9 July 2020 | Intellect | 1,172 | 29.8% | 24.2% | 8.3% | 9.4% | 1.6% | 1.5% | 2.5% | —N/a | 22.7% |
| 20-27 June 2020 | ASDM | 1127 | 35.8% | 19.6% | 4.1% | —N/a | 5.5% | 1.9% | —N/a | —N/a | 26.8% |
| 12-23 June 2020 | BOP | 1,200 | 22.4% | 11.0% | 2.4% | 1.5% | 1.3% | 0.4% | 1.0% | 0.5% | 59.4% |
| 23-31 May 2020 | FOP | 1767 | 35.8% | 23.3% | 4% | —N/a | 5% | 2.2% | 5% | 9.9% | 13.8% |
| 5-11 May 2020 | CBS-Research | 1003 | 14.3% | 11.8% | 3.7% | 1.0% | 2.5% | 1.5% | 1.2% | 0.9% | 57.6% |

=== Second round ===
==== Sandu vs. Dodon ====
| Source | Date | Sample size | Sandu PAS | Dodon PSRM | Undecided | Will not vote |
|---|---|---|---|---|---|---|
| Timpul | 3-7 November 2020 | 1,086 | 51.5% | 48.5% | —N/a | —N/a |
| ADM poll | 5-20 August 2020 | 1,200 | 44% | 56% | —N/a | —N/a |
| iData | 14-26 July 2020 | 1,200 | 34.3% | 40.5% | —N/a | 25.2% |
| BOP | 12-23 June 2020 | 1,200 | 33.3% | 29.1% | 14.1% | 23.5% |

==== Usatîi vs. Dodon ====
| Source | Date | Sample size | Usatîi PN | Dodon PSRM | Undecided | Will not vote |
|---|---|---|---|---|---|---|
| BOP | 12-23 June 2020 | 1,200 | 26.3% | 27.2% | 16.4% | 30.1% |

==== Năstase vs. Dodon ====
| Source | Date | Sample size | Năstase PPDA | Dodon PSRM | Undecided | Will not vote |
|---|---|---|---|---|---|---|
| BOP | 12-23 June 2020 | 1,200 | 24.7% | 30.6% | 13.9% | 30.7% |

==== Năstase vs. Usatîi ====
| Source | Date | Sample size | Năstase PPDA | Usatîi PN | Undecided | Will not vote |
|---|---|---|---|---|---|---|
| BOP | 12-23 June 2020 | 1,200 | 22.3% | 26.4% | 17.1% | 34.2% |

==== Sandu vs. Usatîi ====
| Source | Date | Sample size | Sandu PAS | Usatîi PN | Undecided | Will not vote |
|---|---|---|---|---|---|---|
| BOP | 12-23 June 2020 | 1,200 | 32.8% | 22.9% | 15.3% | 29% |

== Results ==
| Candidate | Party | First round | | Second round | |
| Candidate | Party | Votes | % | Votes | % |
|---|---|---|---|---|---|
| Maia Sandu | Party of Action and Solidarity | 487,635 | 36.16 | 943,006 | 57.72 |
| Igor Dodon | Independent (PSRM) | 439,866 | 32.61 | 690,615 | 42.28 |
| Renato Usatîi | Our Party | 227,939 | 16.90 | | |
| Violeta Ivanov | Șor Party | 87,542 | 6.49 | | |
| Andrei Năstase | Dignity and Truth Platform Party | 43,924 | 3.26 | | |
| Octavian Țîcu | National Unity Party | 27,170 | 2.01 | | |
| Tudor Deliu | Liberal Democratic Party of Moldova | 18,486 | 1.37 | | |
| Dorin Chirtoacă | Union Political Movement | 16,157 | 1.20 | | |
| Total | | 1,348,719 | 100.00 | 1,633,621 | 100.00 |
| Valid votes | | 1,348,719 | 98.55 | 1,633,621 | 98.76 |
| Invalid/blank votes | | 19,797 | 1.45 | 20,529 | 1.24 |
| Total votes | | 1,368,516 | 100.00 | 1,654,150 | 100.00 |
| Registered voters/turnout | | 2,995,891 | 45.68 | 3,135,474 | 52.76 |
Source: Alegeri.md, CEC

Vote share
Second round
| Sandu | 57.72% |
| Dodon | 42.28% |
First round
| Sandu | 36.16% |
| Dodon | 32.61% |
| Usatîi | 16.90% |
| Ivanov | 6.49% |
| Năstase | 3.26% |
| Țîcu | 2.01% |
| Deliu | 1.37% |
| Chirtoacă | 1.20% |

== Analysis ==
Results of the 2020 Moldovan presidential election. The left map shows the winner in the first round by territorial electoral commissions. The right map shows the winner in the second round by territorial electoral commissions.

The first round of the election was characterized by a historically high turnout of the diaspora. Moldovans living abroad were responsible for 15% of the cast ballots. As expatriates voted overwhelmingly for Maia Sandu, their high turnout is considered one of the main reasons for her first-round win. Because most polls gave an edge to incumbent president Dodon, Maia Sandu's result was considered unexpected by experts. Multiple analysts voiced the opinion that Renato Usatîi, who came in third and positioned himself as a centrist, was expected to play a decisive role in the second round by announcing his support for one of the two candidates. Usatîi later advised people who voted for him to vote against Dodon in the second round.

An exit poll from the day of the second round suggested Sandu had won with 54.8% of the vote. The actual results (released later) showed Sandu winning by a larger margin, with 57.72% of the vote. Sandu's victory was again helped by her lead in the diaspora's vote. Sandu nevertheless won 51% of votes on Moldova alone.

== Aftermath ==
=== International reactions ===
- Azerbaijan: President Ilham Aliyev congratulated Sandu through a letter and expressed his faith that the relations between Azerbaijan and Moldova will continue to develop and expand.
- Belarus: President Alexander Lukashenko congratulated Sandu, saying that the hoped to "enrich bilateral relations" between Moldova and Belarus with "new creative initiatives". Opposition leader Sviatlana Tsikhanouskaya also congratulated Sandu, saying that she was "deeply impressed with her bravery and dedication".
- France: President Emmanuel Macron congratulated Sandu emphasizing France's ongoing support for Moldova's European integration efforts.
- Germany: Chancellor Angela Merkel congratulated Sandu on her "strong mandate" and wished her success in dealing with the multiple issues Moldova was facing.
- Italy: President Sergio Mattarella congratulated Sandu, saying that he hoped to "further consolidate the excellent relationship" between Italy and Moldova.
- Latvia: President Egils Levits contacted Sandu to congratulate her on the election win. In the discussion, Levits emphasized Latvia's continued assistance to Moldova in the reform process.
- Oman: Sultan Haitham bin Tariq Al Said expressed his congratulations to Sandu for winning the elections and his desire to improve relations between Moldova and Oman.
- Poland: President Andrzej Duda congratulated Sandu and said that Poland was "determined to strengthen high-level Moldovan-Polish relations both on bilateral and European level".
- Romania: President Klaus Iohannis was the first head of state to congratulate Sandu on her victory, doing this through a phone call and Twitter. It was announced that Iohannis would visit Chișinău once Sandu assumed the presidential office and Moldova's integration path into the EU was discussed. Later, Prime Minister Ludovic Orban also congratulated Sandu.
- Russia: President Vladimir Putin sent a telegram congratulating Sandu and looking forward to "constructive development of relations". Opposition leader Alexei Navalny also congratulated Sandu, saying that he welcomed the election of a president who would fight corruption. Patriarch Kirill of Moscow congratulated Sandu as well, saying that he wished for "the continuation of a productive interaction between the authorities and the Eastern Orthodox Church in Moldova".
- Ukraine: President Volodymyr Zelenskyy was the second head of state to congratulate Sandu. He said that he was looking forward to strengthening the relations between Moldova and Ukraine on their path to the European Union membership during Sandu's presidency.

=== Fraud allegations ===
Moldovan President Igor Dodon alleged multiple voting irregularities including the prevention of Transnistrians from voting, organized transportation of voters in EU countries and interference from foreign leaders. Dodon said that he would consider conceding defeat if the courts found nothing inappropriate in the voting process. He said "if the courts found that everything is okay, then we will put a full stop there". He also said that he was congratulating Sandu as a precaution.

In 2021, leaked documents from the German newspaper Bild showed Russia supported the campaign for the 2020 Moldovan presidential election of Dodon and other candidates considered "friendly" to the country. According to these claims, Russia would have spent some 11.4 million euros, 4 million of which would have directly gone for Dodon and the other candidates themselves. Similar claims were made by Usatîi already in November 2020. PSRM denied these claims and announced it would file a lawsuit against the German newspaper and all Moldovan media "that took part in the dissemination of this blatant slander".
