= German Gorbuntsov =

Russian banker

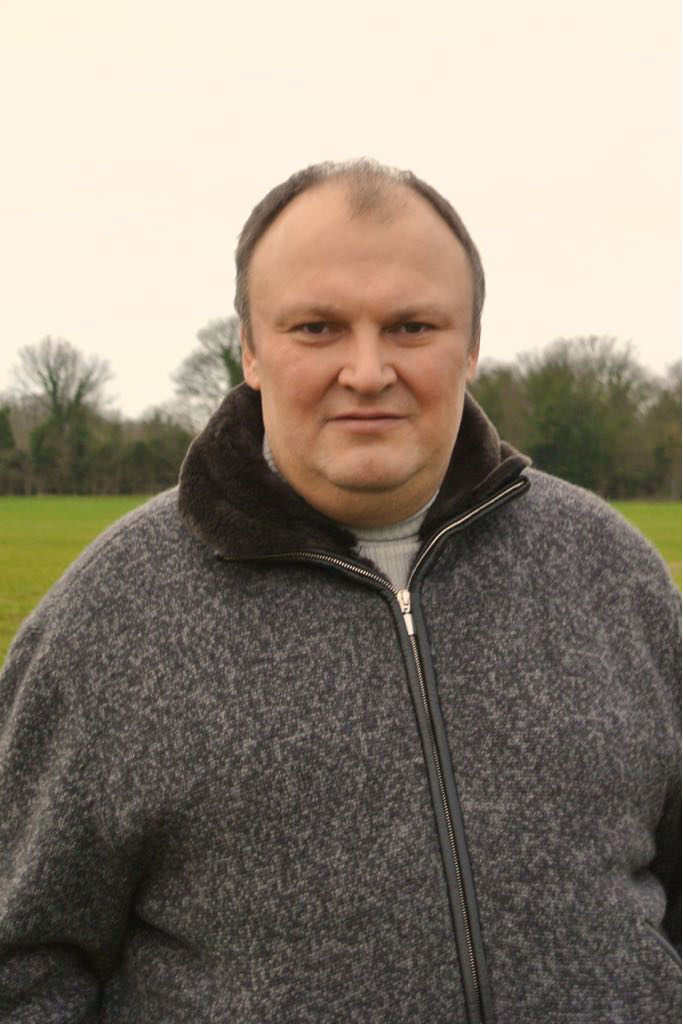
- Born: 12 April 1966 (age 59); Moscow, USSR
- Occupations: businessman, banker

German Valeryevich Gorbuntsov (Russian: Герман Валерьевич Горбунцов, born 12 April 1966) is a Russian businessman, banker. He was a member of the board of directors of the banks: Inter-Rus, Bank Industrial Credit, InterCredit Bank, VIP Money Transfer, Conversbank-Moscow and Interprogress.

== Biography ==
In 2006, Gorbuntsov became the owner of HC Spartak Moscow hockey club and his close friend Pyotr Chuvilin became the director. Three months before the purchase, the hockey team virtually ceased to exist due to financial difficulties, but by December 2006, it had returned to the top division in the Russian championship. In February 2008, Gorbuntsov received the “Person of the Year 2007” award “For his contribution to the revival of Russian sport”. Later, in 2009-2011, he was also the chairman of the board of Spartak.

At the end of 2008, Gorbuntsov acquired about 80 percent of the shares of Moldovan bank Universalbank. According to media reports that same year, the banker received Moldovan citizenship.

Gorbuntsov co-owned Capital Commercial Bank. He later provided a list of Russian Railways contractors to journalists, many of which used the bank, and were implicated in possible corruption.

German Gorbuntsov survived an unsuccessful attempt on his life on 20 March 2012 in central London. According to The Guardian, the assassination attempt on Gorbuntsov originated from the Solntsevskaya Bratva organized crime syndicate in Moscow. Gorbuntsov, who was seriously injured, was hospitalized in critical condition and put into an artificial coma, which he was kept in until 1 April. A criminal case was brought against Vladimir Plahotniuc in Russia for the alleged assassination attempt of Gorbuntsov; however, Interpol declined to put Plahotniuc on their international wanted list, stating that they "cannot intervene in what are essentially political disputes between member states."
