= Our Party (Moldova) =

Political party in Moldova

Our Party Partidul Nostru
- Abbreviation: PN
- Leader: Renato Usatîi
- Founded: 1999
- Preceded by: Christian Democratic Peasants' Party of Moldova
- Headquarters: 117 București Street, Chișinău
- Membership (2018): ~44,800
- Ideology: Left-wing populism Social conservatism Moldovenism; Soft Euroscepticism; Soft Russophilia
- Political position: Left-wing
- Colors: Blue; Dark blue (before 2025); White
- Parliament: 6 / 101
- District Presidents: 0 / 32

Website
- pn.md

Our Party (Romanian: Partidul Nostru, PN), formerly known as the Republican People's Party (Romanian: Partidul Popular Republican, PPR), is a left-wing populist political party in Moldova. Founded in 1999 as the Peasants' Christian Democratic Party of Moldova (Partidul Țărănesc Creștin Democrat din Moldova), it promotes social conservatism, along with soft Euroscepticism and soft Russophilia. The party's chairman is Renato Usatîi.

== History ==
At the 2005 Moldovan parliamentary election, the party won 1.4% of the popular vote but no seats. The 6th National Conference of the Peasants' Christian Democratic Party of Moldova took place on 28 May 2005. The conference decided to change the name of the party to the Republican People's Party and adopted a new status and program. Its chairman became Nicolae Andronic. The party was in opposition to the Party of Communists of the Republic of Moldova (PCRM), who governed until 2009. On 13 April 2014, a party congress took place, in which Andronic ceded leadership to Usatîi, and the party was renamed Our Party. On 10 June 2014, the Ministry of Justice of Moldova announced that it had not recognised this action. On 8 February 2015, the party congress was repeated and the Ministry of Justice approved on 27 February 2015 the modifications to the party program, status, the new name, and new leader.

== Ideology ==
The party has, at various times, been described as left-wing populist, socially conservative, anti-EU, Moldovenist, and pro-Russian. It is placed on the left of the political spectrum. Lisa Gohlke also described it as centrist. Our Party presents itself as "the voice of the people" and an experienced fighter against corruption; it wishes to represent the socioeconomic interests of "the ordinary people", which it defines as farmers, villagers, and the elderly. It argues that Moldova is a "pseudodemocracy" where the people must serve the will of those who govern rather than the other way around. The party argues that this situation came to be because of the pro-European parties who "through bribery, corruption, intimidation, and blackmail [...] created an entire system of the captured state" and which represent a small, wealthy group of Moldovan society "whose wealth cannot be explained by legal means".

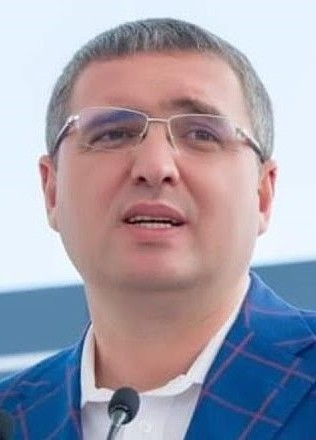
Renato Usatîi in 2020

The party appeals to the nostalgia of Soviet rule and believes that ever since its independence, Moldova has been experiencing socio-economic decline, "spiritual and moral degradation", demographic catastrophe, loss of its territories in the form of Transnistria, and the "degeneration of the political elite". The party identifies the corruption of pro-Western governments as the root cause of these issues, claiming that along with its Western backers, the Moldovan elites "have plundered the country, leaving nothing for its inhabitants". The party proposes radical reforms to root out corruption, redistribution of funds towards desolate areas, and transforming Moldova into a "normal state" where state institutions work for the people. The PN also postulates vocational training programs, modernization of the country's transport infrastructure, and a new anti-corruption institution "Moldovan Mossad". Additionally, the party opposes LGBT rights and is perceived as favoring closer ties between Moldova and Russia.

Our Party considers itself a pragmatic, antisystemic, anti-corruption and anti-oligarchic force. It opposes the European integration policy of Moldova, and was described as one of "the most radical pro-Russian parties" in Moldova. The leader of the party, Renato Usatii, argues that the European Union "wants to drown the country in debts so that it has to volunteer to reunite with its better-off neighbour Romania".

In recent years, however, Renato Usatîi has changed his rhetoric, abandoning the pro-Russian one. For example, he stated that he supports the accession of the Republic of Moldova to the Schengen Area. At the same time, he said that he does not believe that the Republic of Moldova will join the European Union in 2030 and that in reality the European Union is in a process of dissolution similar to the one that the Soviet Union went through.

== Election results ==
=== Presidential ===
| Election | Candidate | First round | | Second round | | Result |
| Election | Candidate | Votes | % | Votes | % | Result |
|---|---|---|---|---|---|---|
| 2016 | Dumitru Ciubașenco | 85,466 | 6.03% | Endorsed Igor Dodon | | Lost ✗ |
| 2020 | Renato Usatîi | 227,938 | 16.90% | Against Igor Dodon (but he did not endorse Maia Sandu) | | Lost ✗ |
| 2024 | Renato Usatîi | 213,168 | 13.79% | No endorsement | | Lost ✗ |

=== Parliamentary elections ===
Parliament
| Election | Leader | Performance | | | | | Rank | Government |
| Election | Leader | Votes | % | ± pp | Seats | +/– | Rank | Government |
|---|---|---|---|---|---|---|---|---|
| 2019 | Renato Usatîi | 41,769 | 2.95% | New | 0 / 101 | New | 6th | Extra-parliamentary |
| 2021 | Renato Usatîi | 60,100 | 4.1% (Electoral Bloc "Renato Usatîi") | New | 0 / 101 | New | 4th | Extra-parliamentary |
| 2025 | Renato Usatîi | 97,852 | 6.20% | ▲2.10 | 6 / 101 | ▲6 | 4th | Opposition |

=== Local elections ===
==== Department and municipality councils ====
| Election year | No. of votes | % of votes | No. of overall seats won | +/– |
|---|---|---|---|---|
| 2015 | 143,387 | 11.2 | 135 / 1,116 | |

==== City and countryside councils ====
| Election year | No. of votes | % of votes | No. of overall seats won | +/– |
|---|---|---|---|---|
| 2015 | 87,090 | 8.2 | 784 / 10,570 | |

==== Mayors ====
| Election year | Mayors | % of overall mayor mandates | No. of overall mandates won | +/– |
|---|---|---|---|---|
| 2015 | 43 | 4.8 | 43 / 898 | |
| 2019 | 23 | 2.6 | 23 / 898 | ▼20 |
| 2023 | 17 | 1.9 | 17 / 898 | ▼6 |
