= Moldovan diaspora =

Diaspora of Moldova

Moldovan diaspora in the world as of 2022 (includes people with Moldovan citizenship or ancestry from Moldova): Moldova +100,000 +10,000 +1,000

The Moldovan diaspora is the diaspora of Moldova, including Moldovan citizens abroad or people with ancestry from the country, regardless of their ethnic origin. Very few of them have settled in other parts of the world, but there is a significant number of them in some countries, mostly in the former Soviet Union, Italy, Spain, Romania, Portugal, Greece, Canada, and the United States of America.

== List of countries with Moldovan diaspora ==
| Country | No. of Moldovan ancestry | % of country population |
|---|---|---|
| Romania | 285,000 (2020) | 1.42 |
| Ukraine | 258,619 (2001) (Note: The vast majority of the Moldovans in Ukraine are members of the indigenous ethnic minority in the country.) | 0.62 |
| Germany | 122,000 (2022) | 0.14 |
| Italy | 102,667 (2024) | 0.17 |
| Russia | 77,509 (2021) | 0.05 |
| France | 26,300 (2019) | 0.03 |
| Canada | 20,470 (2021) | 0.06 |
| Spain | 17,426 (2011) | 0.04 |
| Kazakhstan | 14,245 (2009) | 0.08 |
| Portugal | 13,586 (2011) | 0.13 |
| Greece | 9,920 (2006) | 0.09 |
| United States | 7,859 (2000) | 0.002 |
| Belarus | 3,465 (2009) | 0.04 |
| United Kingdom | 3,417 (2015) | 0.005 |
| Latvia | 1,967 (2016) | 0.10 |
| Ireland | 1,967 (2016) | 0.04 |
| Lithuania | 540 (2011) | 0.02 |
| Kyrgyzstan | 505 (2009) | 0.01 |
| Estonia | 502 (2011) | 0.04 |
| Brazil | 269 (2025) | 0.00 |
| Sweden | 186 (2008) | 0.002 |
| Tajikistan | 157 (2010) | 0.002 |
| Mexico | 20 (2012) | 0.00 |

== Politics ==
=== 2025 ===
| Territorial Unit | Nr. of votes | Turnout | PAS | BEP | BA | PN | PPDA | Others |
|---|---|---|---|---|---|---|---|---|
| Diaspora | 277,964 | —N/a | 78.61 | 5.03 | 2.08 | 5.50 | 5.12 | 3.66 |
| Total | 1,578,728 | 52.21 | 50.20 | 24.17 | 7.96 | 6.20 | 5.62 | 5.85 |
Source: CEC

=== 2021 ===
| No. | Administrative-territorial unit | % | PAS | BECS | ȘOR | BERU | PPDA | PDM | AUR |
|---|---|---|---|---|---|---|---|---|---|
| | Diplomatic missions (Moldovan diaspora) | | 86.23 | 2.47 | 0.59 | 2.78 | 1.75 | 0.34 | 0.62 |
| Total | | 48.41 | 52.80 | 27.17 | 5.74 | 4.10 | 2.33 | 1.81 | 0.49 |
Source: CEC

=== 2019 ===
| No. | Administrative-territorial unit | Turnout | PSRM | ACUM | PDM | ȘOR | PCRM | PN | PL |
|---|---|---|---|---|---|---|---|---|---|
| | Diplomatic missions (Moldovan diaspora) | N/A | 8.52% | 73.09% | 4.81% | 2.48% | 1.56% | 2.82% | 2.77% |
| Total | | 49.22% | 31.15% | 26.84% | 23.62% | 8.32% | 3.75% | 2.95% | 1.25% |
Source: CEC

== See also ==
- Aromanian diaspora
- Romanian diaspora
