= 2025 Moldovan parliamentary election =

- 28 September 2025
- All 101 seats in Parliament; 51 seats needed for a majority
- Turnout: 52.21% (▲3.80 pp)
Party	Leader	Vote %	Seats	+/–
PAS	Igor Grosu	50.20	55	−8
BEP	Igor Dodon	24.20	26	−6
Alternative	Ion Ceban	7.96	8	New
PN	Renato Usatîi	6.20	6	+6
PPDA	Vasile Costiuc	5.62	6	+6
This lists parties that won seats. See the complete results below.
Results by district
Prime Minister before	Prime Minister after
Dorin Recean; Independent	Alexandru Munteanu; Independent
Cabinet before	Cabinet after
Recean Cabinet; PAS	Munteanu Cabinet; PAS

Parliamentary elections were held in Moldova on 28 September 2025. Moldova is a parliamentary republic; the Parliament of Moldova has the main authority of creating laws and appointing the government, and executive powers are primarily derived from the legislature. The main parties and coalitions contesting the election were the ruling pro-European Party of Action and Solidarity (PAS), the pro-Russian Patriotic Electoral Bloc (BEP), the centre-left and nominally (Note: Alternative's true commitment to pro-Europeanism was questioned by multiple media sources and political analysts and by PAS and the European Union (EU).) pro-European Alternative (BA), and the left-wing populist and mildly pro-Russian Our Party (PN).

The election was described as potentially determining the fate of Moldova's accession bid into the European Union (EU), with President Maia Sandu calling it "the most important election in the history of the country". Reports both from the Moldovan authorities and national and international media outlets described Russian electoral interference, which included disinformation and manipulation campaigns, plans for protests and unrest, cyberattacks and vote buying. Two pro-Russian parties, the Heart of Moldova Party (PRIM, part of the Patriotic Bloc) and the Greater Moldova Party (PMM), were banned from running two days before the election following allegations of illegal financing linked to Russia.

The election was declared valid at 14:28 EEST (UTC+03:00) after voter turnout surpassed the 33.3% minimum required by law, with the election reaching a final turnout of 52.21%. PAS won just over 50% of the vote and 55 seats, retaining a reduced majority government; the Patriotic Bloc suffered modest losses (compared to the Bloc of Communists and Socialists in the 2021 election), while Alternative, PN, and the populist and unionist (pro-unification with Romania) Democracy at Home Party (PPDA) entered parliament for the first time. The entry of PPDA was regarded as a surprise due to its pre-election polling numbers being invariably below the electoral threshold.

== Background ==
The 2021 Moldovan parliamentary election resulted in a landslide victory for the Party of Action and Solidarity (PAS), a pro-European party led by President Maia Sandu. PAS secured 63 out of 101 seats, allowing it to form a single-party majority government. The election marked a significant shift towards European integration, as PAS defeated the Bloc of Communists and Socialists, a pro-Russian electoral alliance.

After coming to power, the PAS government pursued anti-corruption measures, judicial reforms, and European Union (EU) integration. Pro-Russian opposition forces organized protests against the government amid Moldova's economic problems; the protests were partly financed with money from Russia according to Moldova's Anti-Corruption Prosecutor's Office (PA).

In the 2024 Moldovan presidential election, Sandu was re-elected with 55.3% of the vote, defeating pro-Russian candidate Alexandr Stoianoglo. The election was overshadowed by Russian interference, also featuring misuse of public resources by the government and unbalanced media coverage in Sandu's favour, and it took place at the same time as a referendum on EU integration, which narrowly passed with 50.4% support. Viorel Cernăuțeanu, the head of the Moldovan Police, stated that dozens of millions of US dollars had been transferred to a total of over 138,000 people in Moldova, about 10% of the active electorate, through the Russian bank Promsvyazbank in order to "massively corrupt the electorate" of the presidential election and referendum, with the number of people benefitting from this system reportedly being much greater as recipients were also given money for their family members. As a result of Russian interference and vote buying, the outcome of both votes was influenced, with the EU referendum passing only narrowly.

In January 2025, an energy crisis erupted in Moldova as Russia halted natural gas supplies to Moldova's Russia-backed unrecognized breakaway region of Transnistria. Sandu and the Moldovan authorities accused Russia of causing the crisis to influence the upcoming parliamentary election, with several foreign analysts and think tanks supporting this view, arguing that the crisis could undermine the popularity of PAS and Moldova's path towards Europe and lead to pro-Russian parties regaining power.

According to Moldovan think tank WatchDog, PAS completed around 56% of its 2021 promises during its four years in government. According to the German Marshall Fund, PAS has been criticized for limiting opportunities for other pro-EU parties. The Carnegie Endowment for International Peace argued that the "pro-Russian" label had been increasingly instrumentalized against the opposition during pro-government mobilization for the 2025 election, and stated that "Western-funded civil society" had increasingly become an extension of governmental capacity. An International Press Institute survey among Moldovan media representatives found that their biggest worry was Russian disinformation and propaganda, with some respondents also reporting worry about self-censorship in outlets closely aligned editorially with the government's stances on European integration and the Russian invasion of Ukraine, in a reported "sort of symbiosis" existing between some of these outlets and the government. Further, the COVID-19 pandemic in 2020 during Sandu's first term, the Russian invasion of Ukraine in 2022 which triggered an economic setback and a massive influx of refugees, the 2025 energy crisis, high inflation and reform fatigue reduced PAS' popularity. Amidst Russian interference and disinformation campaigns, Euronews described the election as being for Sandu "a final battle" on Moldova's road to EU membership.

== Electoral system ==
The 101 members of the Parliament are elected by party-list proportional representation on a nationwide closed list. The electoral threshold at the national level varies according to the type of list; for parties or individual organizations it is 5%; for an electoral bloc it is 7%. For independent candidates, the threshold is 2%. Moldova is a parliamentary republic, with the Parliament having the main authority of creating laws and appointing the government and executive powers being primarily derived from the legislature.

== Campaign ==
=== Prelude and bloc formations ===
On 31 January, Moldovan opposition leader Alexandr Stoianoglo, who lost the 2024 presidential election to President Sandu, announced the formation of a new coalition to challenge the pro-Western ruling majority. The coalition, called Alternative, unites three political parties led by Chișinău Mayor Ion Ceban, former Prime Minister Ion Chicu, and former lawmaker Mark Tkachuk. While Stoianoglo campaigned on a foreign policy that included both Russia and the West, he had leaned toward Russia, with his past presidential candidacy backed by the pro-Moscow Party of Socialists of the Republic of Moldova (PSRM).

In 2023, the National Alternative Movement (MAN) and the European Social Democratic Party (PSDE) started talks for a merger which fell apart in the prelude of the 2024 presidential election. Tudor Ulianovschi claimed that PSDE was not invited into the MAN's Alternative coalition. In May, former PDM leader Dumitru Diacov called for a merger of PSDE and Marian Lupu's Respect Moldova Movement (MRM). In July, PSDE proposed a "European Moldova Alliance" with the Coalition for Unity and Welfare (CUB) and the League of Cities and Communes (LOC), both former members of the Together bloc. In August, Boris Foca announced that the Modern Democratic Party (PDMM) will compete and called former PDM members to join. Diacov also reiterated his call for a merger of PSDE, MRM, and PDMM.

On 4 June 2025, the For Moldova Platform was formed aiming to unite the opposition parties and later received support from the PSRM, the Party of Communists and Future of Moldova Party. On 10 June, George Simion, leader of the party Alliance for the Union of Romanians (AUR) in Romania, called on Moldovans to vote in the election to "take revenge" and "defeat politically" Sandu. At the 2025 Romanian presidential election, in the second round, Sandu and PAS had supported Simion's opponent, Nicușor Dan, who won the election. On 4 July, Igor Dodon announced negotiations for a left-wing bloc. Vladimir Voronin later confirmed that the bloc would include the PSRM, PCRM, Heart of Moldova Party and the Future of Moldova Party. The Patriotic Electoral Bloc was registered on 3 August without the PCRM, which joined five days later. The Liberal Democratic Party of Moldova (PLDM), led by Vlad Filat, submitted its registration application for the election on 15 July, one day after the deadline. The PLDM's appeal was rejected by the Supreme Court of Justice (CSJ) on 2 September, so the party was excluded from the race.

In a 6 July 2025 congress of the Victory bloc held in Moscow in Russia, the bloc's leader, Moldovan fugitive oligarch Ilan Shor, stated that he wanted Evghenia Guțul, Governor of Gagauzia, to head Victory's electoral list for the 2025 parliamentary election. At the moment, Guțul was being investigated for two criminal cases and was under house arrest. Shor also stated at the same congress that he believed "the only salvation" for Moldova was "union with the Russian Federation" and that "it makes no sense to talk about the country's independence", adding the comment "one currency, one parliament". On 5 August 2025, just weeks before the election, Guțul was sentenced to seven years in prison for using undeclared Russian funds to finance political activities. In July, the Central Electoral Commission (CEC) cancelled Victory's registration. After its cancellation, the members decided to register separately but on the next day (3 August), Chance, FASM and Victory (as well as non-member Agrarian Party of Moldova) were barred too. The Ministry of Justice announced that it sought to dissolve said parties alongside also Victory bloc member Revival Party. On 15 August, Revival was barred from running too.

On 20 August, PCRM leader Voronin commented on the so-called "kuliok" (black bag) case, stating that his coalition partner PSRM leader Dodon received 860,000 euros from Vladimir Plahotniuc and that he had already testified before the Anti-Corruption Prosecutor's Office. In the case, Dodon was accused of passive corruption and of organizing and accepting funding for a political party from a criminal organization. According to the charges, Dodon accepted money from then PDM leader and later fugitive oligarch Plahotniuc in 2019 to fund the PSRM. Voronin withdrew his statements a day later, calling them a sarcastic joke. Voronin had criticized Dodon many times in the past, considering him a "traitor" for having left the PCRM in 2011 and having divided the PCRM's voters with the PSRM. At the time, Voronin only held the 49th place on the Patriotic Bloc's list of candidates, which Dodon headed, having little chances of entering the parliament, although Voronin stated there was an agreement within the bloc to promote him to 32nd place. According to Moldovan journalist and Nokta founder Mihail Sirkeli, his low place on the list would have humiliated Voronin, with Sirkeli suggesting Voronin could have made the statements about the kuliok case either to sabotage the bloc or as a personal maneuver to secure a safe position on its list.

On 23 August, the registration of the Greater Moldova Party (PMM) was rejected by the CEC, the stated reason being that, following the exclusion from its electoral list of a person convicted of domestic violence, which made the person ineligible for being included as a candidate, the party's list failed to meet the minimum quota of candidates from each gender required by the legislation in effect. Party president Victoria Furtună, who has ties to Shor, claimed that the decision was politically motivated and that she would appeal it. The Party for People, Nature, and Animals (PONA), led by Ion Dron, was also excluded for the same reason and also because of incomplete documentation as the CEC stated. Nevertheless, as per rulings by the Central Court of Appeal and the CSJ, the CEC registered the PMM in the election on 5 September, with the reservation of excluding the party again if it did not modify its list to comply with the gender quota.

=== Start of the campaign ===
On 29 August, the electoral campaign officially started. On 2 September, anti-corruption officials and prosecutors performed raids in Chișinău and Comrat with regards to a case of illegal funding of the Heart of Moldova Party (PRIM). As the National Anti-Corruption Center (CNA) declared that day, 17 people were suspects in the case, of whom 13 were under investigation and four others had been detained; the latter included three officials of PRIM's Comrat territorial organization and a deputy mayor of Comrat. In response, PRIM leader and former Gagauz governor Irina Vlah accused the government of exerting pressures. On 5 September, Moldova's Interinstitutional Supervisory Council decided to block funds and economic resources in Moldova belonging to Vlah. She had been sanctioned by Canada on 28 August, being accused of Russian interference activities before the election.

On 8 September, Alternative bloc's Ceban, who on 9 July was banned from traveling into Romania and the entire Schengen Area for "national security reasons", was issued a warning by the CEC because, despite having been suspended from his duties as Chișinău mayor on 29 August, he requested a temporary visa citing his status as mayor to attend an event in Rome, Italy, after the electoral campaign started. On 10 September, Our Party (PN) leader Renato Usatîi announced that a PN candidate for the election, Stela Vlas, had been excluded from the party's list after being informed that she had run for the unconstitutional Shor-affiliated Chance party at the 2023 Moldovan local elections. On the same day, Alternative's Tkachuk stated that the 2003 Kozak memorandum should have been signed, sparking a protest by Transnistrian War veterans two days later.

According to an investigation by Moldovan newspaper NordNews, a petition sent on 4 September by the PRIM to the Moldovan parliament and the Ministry of Education and Research for the repair of the school in the village of Constantinovca and the road to access the school contained only a few authentic signatures out of a total of 62, with most coming from people who either were dead, did not live in the village or directly did not exist. The school administration and the Edineț District Council told NordNews they had not informed the authorities about the issues raised in the petition, and one of the villagers was surprised to find his name on it along with a signature that did not belong to him. The list of signatures was reportedly compiled by Aliona Pistriuga, a PRIM member and then the 29th person on the Patriotic Bloc's list of candidates. Forging signatures and including false information in official documents constitutes a crime under Moldovan law. On 16 September, Vlah was banned from entering Lithuania for five years due to her ties to Russia and her support for Russia's attempts at exerting influence over Moldovan politics as Lithuania's Ministry of Foreign Affairs stated.

On 15 September, the CEC ruled that PAS and the Dignity and Truth Platform (PPDA) did not conform a camouflaged electoral bloc. This had been reported to the CEC by the Alternative bloc and the National Moldovan Party (PNM). On 17 September, the CEC issued a warning to the Patriotic Bloc in the context of suspicions of illegal financing of the PRIM, also deciding that it would ask the Ministry of Justice to establish whether the PRIM's activities should be restricted and that it would carry out two financial audits, one for the PRIM and another for the bloc. The CEC also issued a warning for PAS and another for suspended Minister of Environment and PAS candidate Sergiu Lazarencu since, despite having been suspended from his duties during the election campaign, Lazarencu presented himself as minister at two public events, with one of them featuring government insignia on a screen. On 19 September, the Ministry of Justice requested the Central Court of Appeal to restrict the activity of Vlah's PRIM for a year.

=== Final week ===
On 22 September, the unionist (pro-unification with Romania) Unity of the Nation Bloc (BUN), composed by the National Liberal Party (PNL; led by Mihai Severovan) and the Home National Reunification Party (PRNA; led by Valentin Dolganiuc), announced it had withdrawn from the election and endorsed PAS, with both signing a political collaboration agreement. The PNM's leader Dragoș Galbur criticized the BUN's decision and claimed that he had been called by politicians both from Moldova and outside and advised to withdraw from the election. As of 26 September however, the BUN was still featured as a contender on the approved lists of candidates for the election, with representatives of the bloc stating they had presented a withdrawal request to the CEC two days before. On the day of the election, CEC vice president Pavel Postica stated that the BUN had not officially withdrawn from the election and that its endorsement of the PAS had been "political declaration"; the "withdrawn" stamp was thus not put on the ballots for the bloc.

On 23 September, former Moldovan president Nicolae Timofti endorsed PAS on the election. On the next day, Moldovan fugitive oligarch Vladimir Plahotniuc called on Moldovans to vote for opposition parties that had real chances of surpassing the electoral threshold, and Vladimir Cebotari, the founder of the Modern Democratic Party of Moldova (PDMM) and an associate of Plahotniuc, incited citizens to vote for either Alternative or Our Party (PN). Both Ion Ceban, one of Alternative's leaders, and PN leader Renato Usatîi disavowed his endorsement. Also on the same day, President of Romania Nicușor Dan urged Moldovan citizens in Romania to vote in the election, as it was "a decisive moment for Moldova".

Also on 22 September, over 250 searches across over 100 localities in Moldova were carried out by the Moldovan police and agents from other institutions in the context of a criminal case dealing with the preparation of "mass disorder and destabilization" coordinated from Russia through criminal elements. Dodon stated that searches had taken place in the homes of PSRM colleagues in the north of the country, resulting in the detention of four or five people, including the vice president of the PSRM's organization in Rîșcani District. Dodon also declared that protests would take place if the PRIM's activity was limited. On 24 September, Russia summoned Moldova's ambassador to the country Lilian Darii to receive a note of protest after Moldova allegedly refused to accredit Russian observers for the election; Postica stated that the CEC had not received any such official accreditation request so far.

On 24 September, Chișinău police found 200 election ballots in a printing shop in the capital bearing the stamp "voted" for the Alternative bloc. According to Prime Minister Dorin Recean and the Moldovan authorities, they were to be allegedly used in a "carousel-type scheme" for electoral fraud at the election; as they described, in the scheme, a fake ballot would be inserted by a paid voter into the ballot box, and a clean official one, which was to be marked with the same political formation as the fake one, would be taken out of the polling station for its use by the next paid voter. Ceban declared that the ballots were models for campaign advertising, with him demanding a public apology from the police and accusing PAS of lying. However, the CEC stated that the ballots did not meet publicity law requirements and that they constituted electoral agitation and de facto misleading advertising, given, as Postica stated, the difficulty for a simple voter to distinguish a real ballot from a printed one. According to Dan Perciun, Minister of Education and Research, Alternative's models looked identical to real ballots.

On 25 September, Moldovan fugitive oligarch Vladimir Plahotniuc was extradited from Greece to Moldova. Plahotniuc had been on the run since 2019 and was the prime suspect in the 2014 Moldovan bank fraud scandal that saw 1 billion dollars, equivalent to 12% of Moldova's GDP at the time, stolen from the country's banking system. Plahotniuc's lawyer accused the ruling PAS government of turning the extradition into a "political spectacle", of trying to present the event as "a success of its own" and of having done everything possible to ensure the extradition would take place on the eve of the election. On 26 September, PAS organized a rally in which representatives and supporters promoted the party's main campaign messages and urged Moldovans to vote in the election. On the same day, the Promo-LEX NGO reported that it had documented 84 cases of use of administrative resources during the election campaign, with 66 of them from PAS alone, eight from the Patriotic Bloc and five from Alternative.

Also on 25 September, the Heart of Moldova Party (PRIM)'s activity was precautionarily limited by the Central Court of Appeal for the duration of the examination of its case until a verdict was pronounced. This followed a request, accepted by the Court on 23 September, by lawyer Fadei Nagacevschi on the party's behalf to verify the constitutionality of the provisions of the law on the basis of which the limitation of the PRIM's activity was requested, which the CSJ declared inadmissible two days later. In response, Dodon promised that if Vlah and her colleagues were excluded from the Patriotic Bloc's list and the bloc managed to form a parliamentary majority, Vlah would be in the new government. On the same day, Vlah was banned from entering three countries: Poland, for a period of five years, as she was helping Russia interfere in the preparations for Moldova's election according to the Polish Ministry of Foreign Affairs; Latvia, for an indefinite period; and Estonia, as her actions "violate the norms of international law and threaten peace and security" as the Estonian Minister of Foreign Affairs Margus Tsahkna stated, with Vlah having been included in the country's list of sanctioned people. On 26 September, the CEC excluded the PRIM from the election amid accusations of illegal financing of the party. The Patriotic Bloc was required to remove PRIM members from its list of candidates within 24 hours, and members and supporters of the bloc organized a protest over the decision at the CEC's headquarters.

On 26 September as well, Victoria Furtună's Greater Moldova Party (PMM) was also excluded from the election by the CEC, including under the justification that the party benefited from illegal foreign funding and that it promoted the interests of a foreign state, with the CEC also stating that it would ask the Ministry of Justice to limit the party's activity. The decision followed a complaint by the PSDE's leader Ulianovschi amid investigations by Moldovan newspapers Ziarul de Gardă and NordNews that showed the mobilization of the Russian NGO Evrazia's network in support of the PMM (as well as the Patriotic Bloc and Alternative). After receiving information from the Security and Intelligence Service (SIS) and other institutions, the CEC determined that there existed suspicions of the party's illegal funding and of connections with formations created by oligarch Shor, with the CEC also highlighting Furtună's sanctioned status in the EU since 15 July due to destabilizing or threatening actions against Moldovan sovereignty and independence.

In the same session in which the PMM was excluded, the CEC issued a warning to Alternative after Ceban showed a model ballot in the public space and another to prime minister Recean, the 2nd on the PAS' list of candidates, for using administrative resources in a press conference held at the government headquarters "where he made accusations against electoral competitors". Furthermore, that same day, Moldovan newspaper Deschide.MD published alleged audio recordings from closed groups of Shor's network in which it was affirmed that Shor had personally ordered a few days earlier that the network's sympathizers be mobilized to vote for the Patriotic Bloc. 26 September was the last day of the electoral campaign. 27 September, the last day before the election, was the day of election silence; electoral agitation and political advertising were banned, and electoral participants were not allowed to appear on TV or radio broadcasts.

== Election ==
2,772,255 ballots were issued for the election for voters in government-controlled Moldova, 23,500 for voters from Transnistria and 864,300 for voters from the diaspora. For voters in government-held Moldova, 2,170,039 ballots were issued in Romanian, 649,573 in Russian, 3,400 in Gagauz, 1,827 in Bulgarian and 416 in the Romani language. For voters from Transnistria, 14,500 ballots were issued in Romanian and 9,000 in Russian.

2,274 polling stations were opened for the election, of which 1,961 were in Moldova, including 12 in Transnistria, and 301 were opened for the diaspora throughout 45 countries. The countries with the most polling stations were Italy (75), Germany (36), France (26), the United Kingdom (24), Romania (23), the United States (22), Spain (15) and Ireland (12). Two were opened in Russia, in the Embassy of Moldova in Moscow, down from five stations in the 2014 parliamentary election in comparison. The Central Electoral Commission (CEC) and the Ministry of Foreign Affairs of Moldova cited as the reason security risks and the impossibility of ensuring the development of the electoral process and the protection of CEC officials in other Russian cities. Similar reasons were invoked for Israel and Ukraine, where two stations were also opened for each. Furthermore, for the first time in a parliamentary election, voters from ten countries had the possibility of voting by mail. According to the CEC, 2,055 people voted through this method. The deadline for mail voting was 26 September at 18:00 in each country's local time. Four polling stations were opened for mail voting.

Polling stations were to be open from 7:00 to 21:00. The first vote in the election was cast by Ana Teișanu, a Moldovan student at the University of Tsukuba in Japan. For Moldovan citizens in Ukraine, voting began under air alert. Valeriu Chiveri, the Moldovan ambassador to Ukraine, a country then under Russian invasion, stated that, although a large attendance by voters could not be expected under such conditions, the station in Kyiv (there was another in Odesa) was ready to receive them. During the election, Romanian president Nicușor Dan incited Moldovan citizens in Romania to vote. The election was declared valid at 14:28 EEST after 52.21% voter turnout surpassed the minimum 33.3% required by law.

Prime minister Dorin Recean reported that a massive cyberattack had targeted infrastructure related to Moldova's electoral process, with around 4,000 websites being down. He declared that all attacks had been detected and neutralized in real time, without affecting the electoral process. The night before the election, Moldovan government sites had been subject to over 14 million login attempts. The organized transport of voters, illegal under Moldovan law, was reported in Russia (to Moscow and Belarus) and in Transnistria (to government-held Moldova). Furthermore, bomb alerts were reported at several polling stations in the diaspora, which the Moldovan authorities denounced as part of Russia's assault on the electoral process of Moldova. At a polling station in Iași, Romania, a person fired tear gas; nobody was injured and the person was taken away by law enforcement agents. President Sandu declared that so-called "carousel" cases had been recorded, as attempts had been made to take out clean ballots from polling stations to later reintroduce them already stamped. Several bomb scares also disrupted voting in polling places catering to residents of Transnistria. Three people possessing flammable materials were arrested in Chișinău on suspicion of planning riots on election day.

For the election, Moldova's Russian-backed breakaway region of Transnistria requested that 41 polling stations be opened for residents in Transnistria to vote, as it had been the case for the 2021 Moldovan parliamentary election. However, the Moldovan authorities reduced the number to 12. On 25 September, the CEC announced it had decided that five polling stations (two in Varnița and one each in Cocieri, Doroțcaia and Hagimus) meant to serve voters living in Transnistria would be moved dozens of kilometers away; the ones in Varnița to Anenii Noi, the ones in Cocieri and Doroțcaia to Chișinău and the one in Hagimus to Căușeni, making it much more difficult for residents in Transnistria to vote in the election. The CEC stated that it taken the decision following reports from Moldovan police and the SIS, which warned of potential threats, such as possible false bomb alerts and other provocations, in the Security Zone, in which special equipped teams could not be mobilized to intervene in such scenarios if necessary without prior coordination with the Joint Control Commission, a trilateral (Moldovan, Transnistrian, Russian) peacekeeping force and joint military command structure in Transnistria. As of election day, the 12 polling stations for residents in Transnistria had been placed outside of the region, and the bridges connecting Transnistria with the rest of Moldova were closed amid reports that they had been mined. Transnistria's so-called Ministry of Foreign Affairs accused the Moldovan authorities of attempting to prevent residents in Transnistria from voting, with Moldovan TV channel TV8 reporting that bridges were also blocked for the same threat, which was not confirmed, during the 2024 presidential election, preventing many people from voting.

== Parties and coalitions ==
Below is a list of the main parties and electoral blocs which contested the election:

Party or coalition		Lead candidate	Main ideology	International stance	Last election		Government
Party or coalition		Lead candidate	Main ideology	International stance	Vote %	Seats	Government
PAS		Igor Grosu	Liberalism	Pro-Europeanism	52.8%	63	Majority government
BEP	PSRM	Igor Dodon	Democratic socialism Communism; Social conservatism	Russophilia; Euroscepticism	27.2% (Note: Results for the Bloc of Communists and Socialists (PSRM+PCRM) in the 2021 parliamentary election.)	32	Opposition
BEP	PCRM	Igor Dodon	Democratic socialism Communism; Social conservatism	Russophilia; Euroscepticism	27.2%	32	Opposition
BEP	PVM	Igor Dodon	Democratic socialism Communism; Social conservatism	Russophilia; Euroscepticism	27.2%	32	Opposition
BEP	~~PRIM~~ (Note: The PRIM was excluded from the election on 26 September.)	Igor Dodon	Democratic socialism Communism; Social conservatism	Russophilia; Euroscepticism	27.2%	32	Opposition
Alternative	MAN	Ion Ceban	Social democracy	Pro-Europeanism (alleged)	1.2% (Note: Results for PAC–CC (0.8%, 0 seats) and PDCM (0.4%, 0 seats) in the 2021 parliamentary election.)	0	Opposition
Alternative	PDCM	Ion Ceban	Social democracy	Pro-Europeanism (alleged)	1.2%	0	Opposition
Alternative	PAC–CC	Ion Ceban	Social democracy	Pro-Europeanism (alleged)	1.2%	0	Opposition
PN		Renato Usatîi	Left-wing populism Moldovenism	Soft Russophilia; Soft Euroscepticism	4.1%	0	Opposition
PPDA		Vasile Costiuc	Right-wing populism Moldovan–Romanian unionism	Moldovan–Romanian unionism Pro-Europeanism	1.5%	0	Opposition

=== Competing electoral lists ===
#	Party or alliance	Abbr.	Lead candidate	Ideology	Candidates	Bloc members/supported by
1	Party of Action and Solidarity	PAS	Igor Grosu	Liberalism	104	PPDA, BUN (Note: The BUN stated it had withdrawn from the election and endorsed PAS on 22 September, presenting a withdrawal request two days later. However, CEC vice president Pavel Postica stated the bloc did not withdraw officially and that its endorsement had only been a "political declaration", so it remained on the ballot.) (PNL, PRNA)
2	Democracy at Home Party	PPDA	Vasile Costiuc	Moldovan–Romanian unionism	88	
3	Coalition for Unity and Welfare	CUB	Igor Munteanu	Social liberalism	59	
4	Andrei Năstase			Non-partisan	1	
5	Alliance of Liberals and Democrats for Europe	ALDE	Arina Spătaru	Social liberalism	54	
6	Olesea Stamate			Non-partisan	1	
7	European Social Democratic Party	PSDE	Tudor Ulianovschi	Social democracy	86	
8	National Moldovan Party	PNM	Dragoș Galbur	Conservatism	54	
9	Patriotic Electoral Bloc	BEP	Igor Dodon	Russophilia	80	PSRM, PCRM, PVM, PRIM
10	Alternative Bloc	BeA	Ion Ceban (Note: Ceban stated that he did not want to become a parliament member and that he would remain Mayor of Chișinău after the campaign. The following candidate on the list was Alexandr Stoianoglo.)	Pro-Europeanism (alleged)	106	MAN, PDCM, PAC–CC
11	Respect Moldova Movement	MRM	Marian Lupu	Social democracy	101	
12	Together Bloc	BeÎ	Sergiu Tofilat	Pro-Europeanism	60	PS, PVE
13	League of Cities and Communes	LOC	Alexandru Bujorean	Technocracy	54	
14	Alliance for the Union of Romanians	AUR	Boris Volosatîi	Moldovan–Romanian unionism	62	
15	Victoria Sanduța			Non-partisan	1	
16	Moldovans Alliance	AM	Denis Roșca	Conservatism	57	
17	Unity of the Nation Bloc (endorsed PAS)	BUN	Aurelian Silvestru	Moldovan–Romanian unionism	79	PNL, PRNA
18	New Historical Option	NOI	Dimitri Torner	Moderate conservatism	55	
19	Liberal Party	PL	Mihai Ghimpu	Conservative liberalism	58	
20	Christian-Social Union of Moldova	UCSM	Gabriel Călin	Christian left	53	
21	Tatiana Crețu			Non-partisan	1	
22	Our Party	PN	Renato Usatîi	Left-wing populism	103	

Furthermore, the Greater Moldova Party (PMM), led by Victoria Furtună and excluded from participating in the election by the CEC on 26 September, still appeared on the ballot, and without a "withdrawn" mention. This was because the CEC could not take any further measures until the courts gave a final decision, and the party's appeal against the CEC's decision was examined by the Central Court of Appeal early on 28 September, the day of the election. The appeal was rejected later that day, and the votes cast for the party were annulled.

== Opinion polls ==

The following table shows opinion polls on the 2025 parliamentary election taken since the 2021 election, as well as developments relevant in the context of the election that took place meanwhile involving the listed parties. The featured figures exclude poll respondents who were undecided, chose none or did not reply. A number in bold shows that the party surpassed the 5% threshold (7% for coalitions, 2% for independent candidates) to enter parliament. A smaller number shown below shows how many of the 101 seats in parliament the party would have taken. Explanatory notes are provided for extra necessary information.

Pollster	Fieldwork date	Sample size	PAS	BEP				Alternative			PN	PPDA	Victory (Note: Registration rejected by the Central Electoral Commission (CEC).)			PMM (Note: The CEC excluded the PRIM and the PMM from the election on 26 September.)	PSDE	CUB	LOC	PPDA (Note: The Dignity and Truth Platform (PPDA) renounced participating in the parliamentary election and agreed to include two of its own candidates within the PAS' list on 18 July 2025.)	Together		MRM	PNM	Others	Lead
Pollster	Fieldwork date	Sample size	PAS	BCS		PVM	PRIM	Alternative			PN	PPDA	ȘOR		PR	PMM	PSDE	CUB	LOC	PPDA	Together		MRM	PNM	Others	Lead
Pollster	Fieldwork date	Sample size	PAS	PSRM	PCRM	PVM	PRIM	MAN	PDCM	CC	PN	PPDA	PPȘ	ȘOR (Note: In June 2023, the Șor Party was declared unconstitutional by the Constitutional Court of Moldova and has been banned ever since.)	PR	PMM	PSDE	CUB	LOC	PPDA	PS	PVE	MRM	PNM	Others	Lead
	26 Sep 2025	**The Central Electoral Commission excludes Heart of Moldova Party** **and Greater Moldova Party from the election.**																								
CBS Research	12–22 Sep 2025	1,117	**49.5**	**24.0**				**7.3**			**8.8**	3.12	–			2.00	–	–	–	–	–		–	–	5.28	25.5
iData	7–19 Sep 2025	1,059	**33.6**; 40	**33.9**; 41				**9.8**; 11			**7.4**; 9	3.1; 0	–			2.9; 0	2.5; 0	0.5; 0	0.6; 0	–	0.6; 0		1.8; 0	0.3; 0	3.1 (Note: Moldovans Alliance – 0.9, Andrei Năstase – 0.8, ALDE – 0.4, UCSM – 0.4, PL – 0.2, AUR – 0.1, Olesea Stamate – 0.1, NOI – 0.1, Victoria Sanduța – 0.1, Tatiana Crețu – 0.0); 0	0.3
CBS Research–Watchdog	6–13 Sep 2025	1,127	**48.7**	**21.6**				6.9			**12.3**	3.8	–			2.6	1.1	0.2	0.5	–	0.2		0.5	–	1.6 (Note: Andrei Năstase – 0.8, Olesea Stamate – 0.5)	27.1
iData	20 Aug–3 Sep 2025	1,059	**34.7**; 40	**36.0**; 42				**7.9**; 9			**8.4**; 10	1.7; 0	–			– (Note: Barred from running during some or all of the fieldwork.)	3.9; 0	0.5; 0	0.4; 0	–	1.3; 0		1.3; 0	0.4; 0	3.5 (Note: Andrei Năstase – 1.1, Moldovans Alliance – 0.6, PL – 0.4, ALDE – 0.3, UCSM – 0.3, Olesea Stamate – 0.3, Unity of the Nation Bloc – 0.1, NOI – 0.1, Victoria Sanduța – 0.1, AUR – 0.1, Tatiana Crețu – 0.1); 0	1.3
IRI (Note: Values calculated by excluding do not know/will not vote/no answer options)	12–27 Aug 2025	1,170	**43.2**	**27.2**				**11.1**			4.9	2.5	4.9			1.2	–	–	–	–	1.2		–	–	3.7	16.0
iData	7–16 Aug 2025	1,071	**33.8**; 41	**30.1**; 36				**10.9**; 13			**9.3**; 11	2.3; 0	–			3.2; 0	1.9; 0	0.7; 0	1.2; 0	0.1; 0	1.0; 0		1.3; 0	0.6; 0	3.6 (Note: Moldovans Alliance – 0.7, AUR – 0.1, independents – 2.8); 0	3.7
	3 and 8 Aug 2025	**The Patriotic Electoral Bloc, formed by PSRM, PRIM and PVM, is registered**; **PCRM officially joins the bloc five days later.**																								
	19 July 2025	**The Central Electoral Commission rejects the registration of the "Victory" political bloc**; **all its members were later individually rejected too.**																								
	7 and 18 July 2025	**League of Cities and Communes (7 Jul)** **and Dignity and Truth Platform (18 Jul) leave "Together" political bloc; the latter announces it will run on PAS' list.**																								
ATES Research Group	28 Jun–7 Jul 2025	1,032	**39.1**; 50	**14.9**; 19	4.0; 0	1.6; 0	3.6; 0	**9.4**; 12			**7.7**; 10	2.0; 0	**8.9**; 11			0.7	2.3; 0	0.1; 0	3.1; 0				1.1	0.3; 0	1.0 (Note: ALDE – 0.9, independents – 0.1); 0	24.2
IMAS	17–28 Jun 2025	837	**31.5**	**17.4**	3.2	2.3	**5.8**	**11.7**			**9.4**	1.2	**10.4**			2.7	–	–	–				0.8	–	2.9	14.1
IMAS	17–28 Jun 2025	837	**30.0**	**34.8**				**11.4**			**8.9**	–	**9.5**			2.1	–	–	–				0.8	–	2.5	4.8
iData	14–23 Jun 2025	1,015	**40.4**; 49	**16.4**; 20	3.5; 0	0.5; 0	0.9; 0	**10.3**; 13			4.3; 0	0.8; 0	**15.5**; 19			0.9	2.1; 0	0.2; 0	0.9; 0				2.3	–	0.3 (Note: ALDE – 0.2, independents – 0.1); 0	24.0
iData	17–24 May 2025	1,006	**39.2**; 46	**16.5**; 19	3.4; 0	1.3; 0	2.0; 0	**9.3**; 12			**5.4**; 6	0.4; 0	**16.0**; 18			0.6; 0	2.6; 0	0.2; 0	0.9; 0				2.1; 0	0.1; 0	–	22.7
Magenta Consulting–IRI	3–18 May 2025	1,206	**43.9**	**20.7**		–	–	**14.6**			4.8	2.4	3.7			–	<1.2	<1.2	2.4				–	–	2	23.2
iData	16–28 Apr 2025	1,026	**38.7**; 45	**17.0**; 20	2.9; 0	1.0; 0	1.6; 0	**9.9**; 11			**6.2**; 7	0.3; 0	**15.8**; 18			–	3.3; 0	0.3; 0	1.3; 0				–	0.1; 0	4.8; 0	22.9
ATES Research Group	5–13 Apr 2025	1,130	**41.7**	**15.4**	3.9	1.2	2.6	**10.3**			**7.9**	2.3	**9.2**			–	2.3	–	2.4				–	0.2	0.9 (Note: PLDM – 0.2)	26.3
IMAS	26 Mar – 8 Apr 2025	1,113	**33.1**	**17.7**	3.5	3.5	3.9	**12.0**			**8.8**	1.1	**11.6**			–	1.0	0.2	1.9				0.5	0.4	0.8 (Note: PLDM – 0.3)	15.4
iData	14–25 Mar 2025	1,007	**35.0**; 45	**16.0**; 21	3.2; 0	0.8; 0	2.7; 0	**7.8**; 10			**5.0**; 6	0.5; 0	**15.0**; 19			–	4.5; 0	0.9; 0	1.3; 0				–	0.1; 0	0.3 (Note: PLDM – 0.3); 0	19.0
	1 Mar 2025	**Ecologist Green Party joins "Together" political bloc.**																								
iData	13–24 Feb 2025	1,005	**37.3**; 45	**18.2**; 22	**5.9**; 7	–	3.4; 0	5.3; 0			**7.0**; 8	0.4; 0	**16.2**; 19			–	2.1; 0	1.4; 0	1.8; 0			–	–	1.0; 0	–	19.1
Intellect Group	13–21 Feb 2025	1,179	**43.6**	**20.5**	2.1	–	4.2	**11.6**			**9.2**	–	6.6		–	–	–	–	1.8			–	–	–	0.3	23.1
IMAS	15 Jan – 1 Feb 2025	1,130	**33.6**	**28.2**		–	**5.3**	2.8	2.4	–	**10.0**	1.2	**11.8**			–	0.6	0.7	1.5			–	0.3	0.3	1.3 (Note: PLDM – 0.4)	5.4
	31 Jan 2025	**National Alternative Movement, Party of Development and Consolidation of Moldova, Civil Congress and Alexandr Stoianoglo form the Alternative political bloc.**																								
iData-IPP	2–8 Dec 2024	1,006	**44.0**; 49	**20.4**; 23	2.4; 0	–	1.3; 0	**5.3**; 6	1.9; 0	–	**6.9**; 8	0.1; 0	**13.9**; 15			–	0.8; 0	1.2; 0	1.6; 0			–	0.1; 0	0.1; 0	–	23.6
IMAS	15 Nov – 1 Dec 2024	1,030	**37.0**	**30.2**		–	4.1	1.9	2.7	–	**9.8**	1.0	**8.7**			–	0.6	0.4	1.8			–	0.5	0.3	1.0 (Note: PLDM – 0.4)	6.8
CBS Research–Watchdog	11–16 Oct 2024	1,034	**58.3**	**15.9**	2.9	2.7	–	0.5	1.1	–	**7.7**	–	**7.7**			–	0.9	–	0.9			–	–	–	1.6	42.4
Intellect Group	13–15 Oct 2024	985	**40.2**	**16.6**	4.4	–	–	4.7	–	–	**14.8**	–	**12.7**		–	–	–	–	–			–	–	–	6.5	23.6
iData-IPP	19 Sep–10 Oct 2024	1,100	**36.0**	**15.8**	3.3	0.9	–	1.6	3.2	–	**13.6**	–	**17.6**			–	2.4	1.9	2.3			–	0.1	–	1.3 (Note: PLDM – 1.2)	20.2
CBS Research–Watchdog	17–22 Sep 2024	1,021	**51.9**	**12.5**	**6.3**	1.7	–	1.4	1.6	–	**6.1**	–	**12.0**			–	2.8	–	2.1			–	–	–	1.7	39.4
iData	13–18 Sep 2024	1,021	**37.6**; 46	**15.4**; 18	1.8; 0	–	–	4.1; 0	4.6; 0	–	**13.4**; 16	–	**17.5**; 21			–	1.6; 0	1.5; 0	1.3; 0			–	–	0.1; 0	1.1 (Note: PLDM – 0.3, PL – 0.1, independents – 0.7); 0	20.1
iData	19–25 Aug 2024	1,004	**37.0**; 46	**16.1**; 20	4.1; 0	–	–	2.2; 0	3.5; 0	–	**11.2**; 14	–	**17.1**; 21			–	2.5; 0	–	1.6; 0			–	–	–	4.3; 0	19.9
CBS Research–Watchdog	20–23 Aug 2024	1,011	**44.8**	**15.9**	**6.8**	2.7	–	1.3	2.7	–	**5.5**	–	**12.7**			–	4.4	2.1				–	–	–	1.1	28.9
	9 Aug 2024	**Coalition for Unity and Welfare leaves "Together" political bloc.**																								
IMAS	8–21 Jul 2024	1,093	**41.1**	**25.4**		–	–	1.9	3.8	–	**7.1**	1.5	**13.7**			–	1.1	1.5				–	0.7	0.6	1.6 (Note: PLDM – 1.1)	15.7
CBS-AXA	28 Jun–18 Jul 2024	1,119	**40.8**	**22.1**		1.5	–	3.8	3.2	–	**8.1**	–	**12.8**			–	1.4	1.4				–	–	1.1	3.7 (Note: PLDM – 1.1, AUR – 0.6, People's Power Party – 0.6, PL – 0.6)	18.7
IRI	23 May–13 Jun 2024	1,225	**44.0**	**20.0**	4.0	–	–	4.0	**6.7**	–	**5.3**	1.3	**12.0**		–	–	–	<1.3	–	1.3	–	–	–	–	4.0 (Note: PLDM – 1.3)	24.0
iData	22–27 May 2024	1,022	**38.2**; 49	**19.5**; 25	3.7; 0	–	–	1.8; 0	4.2; 0	–	3.4; 0	–	**20.4**; 27			–	2.8; 0	4.9; 0				–	–	–	1.0; 0	17.8
IMAS	2–19 May 2024	1,088	**42.5**	**28.2**		–	–	1.9	3.2	–	4.4	1.5	**14.7**			–	1.0	1.0				–	0.6	0.4	0.7 (Note: PLDM – 0.6)	14.3
iData	22–26 Apr 2024	1,006	**37.8**; 50	**19.7**; 26	4.5; 0	–	–	1.6; 0	4.7; 0	–	4.5; 0	–	**19.1**; 25	–	–	–	2.8; 0	3.6; 0				–	–	–	1.6; 0	18.7
	21 Apr 2024	**Chance, Revival, Alternative and Salvation Force of Moldova and Victory form "Victory" political bloc.**																								
	14 Apr 2024	**Dignity and Truth Platform, Party of Change, Coalition for Unity and Welfare and League of Cities and Communes form "Together" political bloc.**																								
CBS-AXA–WatchDog	6–13 Apr 2024	1,008	**41.6**	**22.6**	**6.8**	–	–	2.5	2.0	–	4.2	–	**8.5**	–	3.2	–	3.2	3.5				–	–	–	2.0	19.0
iData	18–24 Mar 2024	1,131	**36.3**; 45	**20.0**; 24	**7.6**; 9	–	–	1.6; 0	3.3; 0	–	4.7; 0	–	**18.8**; 23	–	2.7; 0	–	–	–	–	1.9; 0	–	–	–	–	3.1; 0	16.3
IMAS	9–27 Feb 2024	1,091	**38.4**	**28.7**		–	–	2.2	4.0	–	4.6	1.5	**14.5**	–	1.0	–	0.8	0.5	–	1.6	–	–	0.4	0.3	1.5 (Note: PLDM – 0.8)	9.7
IRI	27 Jan–22 Feb 2024	1,247	**37.0**	**23.3**	**5.5**	–	–	**5.5**	4.1	–	4.1	1.4	**13.7**	–	–	–	–	1.4	–	1.4	–	–	–	–	3.2 (Note: PLDM – 1.4)	13.7
CBS Research	7–12 Feb 2024	1,104	**34.3**	**29.3**		–	–	1.5	3.8	0.3	4.7	2.6	**10.1**	–	2.1	–	2.3	1.7	–	1.5	0.9	–	–	0.5	4.8 (Note: PLDM – 1.8)	5.0
iData	26–30 Jan 2024	1,011	**37.2**; 49	**20.3**; 27	3.2; 0	–	–	4.7; 0	2.9; 0	–	3.1; 0	–	**19.2**; 25	–	3.6; 0	–	2.8; 0	0.9; 0	–	1.2; 0	–	–	–	–	0.9; 0	16.9
IMAS	29 Nov–16 Dec 2023	954	**34.7**	**30.4**		–	–	4.8	3.8	–	**5.7**	0.6	**13.5**	–	0.7	–	1.1	0.7	–	2.0	–	–	0.3	–	1.8 (Note: PLDM – 0.7)	4.3
iData	2–15 Dec 2023	997	**35.5**; 45	**19.0**; 24	2.7; 0	–	–	**7.2**; 9	3.7; 0	–	4.0; 0	1.2; 0	**17.8**; 23	–	2.1; 0	–	2.5; 0	1.3; 0	–	2.4; 0	0.1; 0	–	–	–	0.5 (Note: PLDM – 0.4, ALDE – 0.1); 0	16.5
**2023 local elections**	5 November 2023	1,147,317	**32.9**	**23.6**	4.3	–	–	1.8	**5.3**	–	4.1	0.5	–	–	3.2	–	**8.1**	–	–	3.6	–	–	–	–	12.6	9.3
iData	22–29 Oct 2023	1,322	**35.6**; 44	**19.3**; 23	2.8; 0	–	–	**5.2**; 6	**5.1**; 6	–	4.6; 0	–	**18.3**; 22	–	1.0; 0	–	3.3; 0	0.9; 0	–	2.1; 0	–	–	–	–	1.6 (Note: PLDM – 0.6); 0	16.3
iData	24–30 Sep 2023	1,002	**45.4**; 56	**31.6**; 39		–	–	4.2; 0	**5.0**; 6	–	3.8; 0	–	3.8; 0	–	0.6; 0	–	1.8; 0	0.8; 0	–	1.6; 0	0.2; 0	–	–	–	1.2 (Note: PLDM – 0.2); 0	13.8
IMAS	2–24 Sep 2023	822	**39.1**	**30.1**		–	–	2.3	4.4	–	**9.5**	1.7	–	–	**5.3**	–	0.5	0.3	–	1.1	–	–	–	0.2	5.5 (Note: PLDM – 0.3, We Build Europe at Home Party – 0.2, AUR – 0.2)	9.0
iData	31 Aug–7 Sep 2023	1,021	**49.4**; 59	**29.6**; 35		–	–	3.0; 0	**5.6**; 7	–	3.4; 0	–	2.2; 0	–	0.6; 0	–	1.0; 0	0.6; 0	–	1.8; 0	–	0.8; 0	–	0.6	1.6; 0	19.8
CBS-AXA–IPP	9–23 Aug 2023	1,215	**42.6**	**23.6**	**6.4**	–	–	1.1	1.8	0.5	1.9	–	–	**15.2**		–	2.1	0.5	–	2.7	0.5	–	–	–	1.1 (Note: PLDM – 0.5)	12.6
IRI	11 Jul–1 Aug 2023	1,199	**41.2**	**16.2**	4.4	–	–	4.4	4.4	1.5	2.9	–	**14.7**	2.9	–	–	–	–	–	1.5	–	–	–	–	5.9 (Note: PLDM – 1.5)	25.0
CBS-AXA–IPRE	13–28 Jun 2023	1,120	**44.0**	**25.7**		–	–	1.3	1.1	–	4.5	–	–	**15.5**	–	–	1.6	0.3	–	1.7	0.2	–	–	0.5	3.7 (Note: PLDM – 1.3, POM – 0.8, PL – 0.8, AUR – 0.5)	18.3
	19 June 2023	**The Șor Party was outlawed by the Constitutional Court.**																								
Intellect Group	15–19 Jun 2023	1,056	**38.1**	**16.0**	**9.6**	–	–	4.8	3.4	–	4.7	–	–	**22.6**	–	–	–	–	–	–	–	–	–	–	0.8	15.5
CBS-AXA–WatchDog	10–19 Jun 2023	1,121	**44.3**	**21.5**		–	–	3.7	4.0	–	4.1	–	–	**13.6**	–	–	1.5	0.7	–	1.9	1.3	–	–	0.3	3.1 (Note: We Build Europe at Home Party – 1.1)	22.8
iData	23–30 May 2023	1,032	**38.5**; 44	**24.2**; 28		–	–	2.1; 0	2.7; 0	–	1.9; 0	–	–	**25.1**; 29	–	–	0.8; 0	1.1; 0	–	1.4; 0	–	–	–	–	2.2 (Note: We Build Europe at Home Party – 0.6); 0	13.4
iData	27 Apr–8 May 2023	1,049	**36.8**; 43	**25.9**; 31		–	–	1.8; 0	3.8; 0	–	3.5; 0	–	–	**22.8**; 27	–	–	1.2; 0	1.3; 0	–	1.3; 0	–	–	–	–	1.6; 0	10.9
CBS-AXA–WatchDog	4–13 Apr 2023	1,015	**47.1**	**26.6**		–	–	2.4	3.5	–	2.6	–	–	**10.1**	–	–	1.8	0.8	–	1.5	0.6	–	–	0.5	2.4 (Note: We Build Europe at Home Party – 1.2)	20.5
iData	15–26 Mar 2023	1,065	**38.4**; 45	**27.1**; 32		–	–	**5.4**; 6	2.7; 0	–	1.9; 0	–	–	**16.1**; 18	–	–	1.3; 0	1.1; 0	–	2.8; 0	–	–	–	–	3.3; 0	11.3
CBS-AXA–WatchDog	24 Feb–3 Mar 2023	1,000	**46.5**	**31.7**		–	–	2.0	2.3	–	2.8	–	–	**10.4**	–	–	–	0.5	–	1.1	0.6	–	–	–	2.0	14.8
iData	15–24 Feb 2023	1,040	**34.5**; 42	**29.4**; 35		–	–	4.8; 0	2.1; 0	–	2.3; 0	–	–	**20.6**; 24	–	–	1.4; 0	–	–	1.8; 0	–	–	–	–	3.1; 0	5.1
IMAS	6–23 Feb 2023	1,100	**32.3**	**34.4**		–	–	4.6	3.1	–	**5.4**	1.8	–	**14.6**	–	–	0.2	0.5	–	1.6	–	–	–	–	1.5 (Note: We Build Europe at Home Party – 0.7, AUR – 0.4, PUN – 0.1)	2.1
Intellect Group	12–22 Feb 2023	1,198	**38.3**; 44	**18.4**; 21	**10.4**; 12	–	–	4.3; 0	–	–	4.9; 0	–	–	**20.7**; 24	–	–	–	1.5; 0	–	–	–	–	–	–	1.5 (Note: We Build Europe at Home Party – 1.2); 0	17.6
Magenta Consulting–FNF	11 Jan–6 Feb 2023	1,421	**40.9**	**21.6**	4.5	–	–	4.5	1.1	–	2.3	–	–	**17.0**	–	–	–	1.1	–	1.1	–	–	–	–	3.4	19.3
CBS-AXA–WatchDog	17–26 Jan 2023	1,001	**33.1**	**31.1**		–	–	4.1	2.3	0.2	3.1	–	–	**16.0**	–	–	–	1.3	–	2.6	1.8	–	–	–	4.4 (Note: AUR – 2.2)	2.0
iData	15–26 Dec 2022	1,006	**34.7**; 39	**34.0**; 38		–	–	**5.6**; 6	1.7; 0	0.1; 0	0.6; 0	0.4; 0	–	**16.5**; 18	–	–	0.7; 0	–	–	3.2; 0	0.1; 0	0.3; 0	–	–	0.5 (Note: AUR – 0.4, PLDM – 0.1); 0	0.7
Intellect Group	1–20 Dec 2022	1,209	**41.55**; 46	**18.73**; 21	**6.90**; 8	–	–	4.37; 0	–	–	3.94; 0	–	–	**24.08**; 26	–	–	–	–	–	–	–	–	–	–	0.43; 0	17.47
IMAS	10–29 Nov 2022	1,100	**34.8**	**33.7**		–	–	3.1	2.6	–	3.1	1.5	–	**16.9**	–	–	1.1	0.3	–	1.4	–	–	–	–	1.5 (Note: AUR – 0.3, PUN – 0.3)	1.1
IDIS–CBS Research–ISPRI	16–23 Nov 2022	1,015	**36.5**	**28.9**	**6.8**	–	–	2.2	–	–	3.3	–	–	**13.3**	–	–	2.2	–	–	3.3	1.3	–	–	–	0.9 (Note: PUN – 0.4)	7.6
IRI	1 Oct–15 Nov 2022	1,233	**36.4**	**22.7**	**7.6**	–	–	4.5	–	–	3.0	1.5	–	**15.2**	–	–	1.5	–	–	1.5	–	–	–	–	6.1	13.7
CBS Research/IPP	29 Oct–10 Nov 2022	1,134	**40.6**	**27.4**	**6.4**	–	–	1.0	0.7	0.7	–	–	–	**16.7**	–	–	1.8	–	–	1.8	0.5	–	–	–	2.2 (Note: PUN – 0.7)	13.2
IDIS–CBS Research–ISPRI	29 Sep–11 Oct 2022	1,066	**38.7**	**30.8**	**6.1**	–	–	1.0	1.0	0.5	2.3	–	–	**12.8**	–	–	1.4	–	–	2.8	–	–	–	–	2.7 (Note: PLDM – 0.4)	7.9
iData	4–10 Oct 2022	1,020	**31.4**; 34	**22.8**; 25	**6.1**; 7	–	–	2.1; 0	1.1; 0	–	1.1; 0	–	–	**27.2**; 30	–	–	–	–	–	**5.1**; 5	–	–	–	–	3.2 (Note: We Build Europe at Home Party – 1.8); 0	4.3
Intellect Group	16 Apr–25 Sep 2022	1,087	**33.4**	**29.8**	**14.1**	–	–	–	–	–	–	–	–	**16.3**	–	–	–	–	–	–	–	–	–	–	6.4	3.6
iData	3–12 Sep 2022	1,012	**29.7**; 34	**31.9**; 37		–	–	3.5; 0	1.8; 0	–	1.2; 0	–	–	**25.6**; 30	–	–	–	–	–	4.4; 0	–	–	–	–	1.8; 0	2.2
IMAS	6–18 Jul 2022	1,007	**30.7**	**42.5**		–	–	–	1.1	–	3.4	2.0	–	**15.5**	–	–	1.4	–	–	1.6	–	–	–	–	1.8 (Note: AUR – 0.5, PUN – 0.4)	11.8
iData	15–23 Jun 2022	1,095	**33.1**; 37	**38.5**; 43		–	–	–	2.0; 0	–	2.6; 0	0.9; 0	–	**18.7**; 21	–	–	–	–	–	2.9; 0	–	–	–	–	1.2; 0	5.4
iData	13–28 May 2022	1,012	**35.9**; 40	**36.9**; 41		–	–	–	2.3; 0	–	1.1; 0	–	–	**17.9**; 20	–	–	0.4; 0	–	–	4.9; 0	–	–	–	–	0.6; 0	1.0
CBS Research	27 Apr–6 May 2022	1,111	**39.7**	**30.7**	**7.1**	–	–	2.9	–	–	1.5	–	–	**10.6**	–	–	1.5	–	–	2.2	0.5	–	–	–	2.7 (Note: AUR – 1.2, PL – 0.3, PUN – 0.1)	7.0
iData	7–18 Apr 2022	1,053	**38.4**; 41	37.7; 40		–	–	–	0.4; 0	–	1.6; 0	0.1; 0	–	**18.2**; 20	–	–	0.4; 0	–	–	2.5; 0	–	–	–	–	0.4 (Note: PUN – 0.3, AUR – 0.1); 0	0.7
IMAS	4–18 Apr 2022	1,109	**38.7**	**36.5**		–	–	–	0.8	–	4.4	2.3	–	**14.7**	–	–	0.4	–	–	0.9	–	–	–	–	1.3 (Note: AUR – 0.7)	2.2
Intellect Group	7–10 Apr 2022	1,089	**34.4**; 38	**44.9**; 49		–	–	3.8; 0	–	–	c. 2.0; 0	–	–	**12.5**; 14	–	–	c. 1.0; 0	–	–	c. 1.0; 0	–	–	–	–	c. 0.5; 0	10.6
IRI	9 Feb–30 Mar 2022	1,306	**46.7**	**28.9**	**6.7**	–	–	–	–	<2.2	–	–	–	**8.9**	–	–	<2.2	–	–	<2.2	–	–	–	–	4.5	17.8
iData	28 March 2022	1,084	**40.0**; 44	**33.7**; 37		–	–	–	0.7; 0	0.3; 0	1.4; 0	1.0; 0	–	**18.9**; 20	–	–	0.7; 0	–	–	1.4; 0	–	–	–	–	1.8 (Note: PUN – 0.3); 0	6.3
iData	15–24 Feb 2022	1,007	**32.6**; 37	**29.4**; 43	**8.9**	–	–	2.3; 0	–	–	–	1.1; 0	–	**18.9**; 21	–	–	–	–	–	4.7; 0	–	–	–	–	2.3; 0	3.3
IMAS	24 Jan–14 Feb 2022	1,123	35.2	**36.1**		–	–	–	0.7	–	**5.8**	1.8	–	**15.7**	–	–	1.2	–	–	1.2	–	–	–	–	2.3 (Note: AUR – 0.5, PUN – 0.5)	0.9
IDIS–CBS Research–ISPRI	25 Jan–5 Feb 2022	1,134	36.0	**40.0**		–	–	2.0	–	–	3.2	–	–	**12.9**	–	–	1.1	–	–	2.3	0.5	–	–	–	1.8 (Note: PUN – 0.4, PL – 0.2)	4.0
iData	11–23 Jan 2022	999	**39.2**; 43	**25.8**; 33	4.5; 0	–	–	1.4; 0	–	–	1.5; 0	–	–	**16.8**; 19	–	–	–	–	–	**5.4**; 6	–	–	–	–	5.4; 0	8.9
iData	12–19 Dec 2021	1,021	**43.8**	**22.7**	**5.8**	–	–	–	–	–	3.8	–	–	**16.5**	–	–	–	–	–	**5.9**	–	–	–	–	1.5	15.3
TSZSZSPP	14–18 Dec 2021	355	**53.79**; 64	**27.02**; 31		–	–	–	0.38; 0	0.73; 0	4.06; 0	1.41; 0	–	**5.58**; 6	–	–	1.76; 0	–	–	2.28; 0	0.13; 0	0.02; 0	–	–	2.84 (Note: We Build Europe at Home Party – 1.24, AUR – 0.45, PUN – 0.41, NOI – 0.33, Hope – 0.15, People's Power Party – 0.07, POM – 0.06, PLD – 0.05, We – 0.04, PRM – 0.03, Patriots of Moldova – 0.01); 0	26.77
IDIS–CBS Research–ISPRI	4–15 Dec 2021	1,055	37.7	**37.8**		–	–	–	–	–	3.7	–	–	**12.6**	–	–	0.6	–	–	3.8	–	–	–	–	3.8 (Note: PUN – 0.9, PL – 0.2)	0.1
iData	15–25 Nov 2021	1,047	**45.5**	**31.5**		–	–	–	–	–	4.1	–	–	**9.8**	–	–	–	–	–	4.5	–	–	–	–	4.5	14.0
TSZSZSPP	16–20 Nov 2021	350	**53.69**; 64	**27.03**; 31		–	–	–	0.39; 0	0.74; 0	4.07; 0	1.42; 0	–	**5.59**; 6	–	–	1.77; 0	–	–	2.29; 0	0.14; 0	0.03; 0	–	–	2.84 (Note: We Build Europe at Home Party – 1.25, AUR – 0.46, PUN – 0.42, NOI – 0.23, Hope – 0.16, People's Power Party – 0.08, POM – 0.07, PLD – 0.06, We – 0.05, PRM – 0.04, Patriots of Moldova – 0.02); 0	26.66
IMAS	23 Oct–15 Nov 2021	834	**38.6**	**36.9**		–	–	–	–	0.7	**6.1**	2.2	–	**10.8**	–	–	1.6	–	–	1.7	–	–	–	–	1.3 (Note: AUR – 0.7, PUN – 0.3)	1.7
IRI	16 Sep–1 Nov 2021	1,619	**56.3**	**21.9**	**7.8**	–	–	–	–	–	3.1	1.6	–	4.7	–	–	1.6	–	–	1.6	–	–	–	–	1.6	26.4
iData	3–18 Oct 2021	834	**51.5**	**27.5**		–	–	–	–	–	**5.7**	0.7	–	**6.7**	–	–	–	–	–	4.2	–	–	–	–	3.8	23.9
iData	12–24 Sep 2021	1,086	**50.5**	**29.3**		–	–	–	–	–	3.0	–	–	**10.3**	–	–	–	–	–	4.1	0.4	–	–	–	2.3 (Note: AUR – 1.3, People's Power Party – 0.4, PUN – 0.3)	21.2
**2021 parliamentary election**	11 Jul 2021	1,467,205	**52.80**; 63	**27.17**; 32		–	–	–	0.43; 0	0.77; 0	4.10; 0	1.45; 0	–	**5.74**; 6	–	–	1.81; 0	–	–	2.33; 0	0.17; 0	0.08; 0	–	–	3.15; 0	25.63

== Russian interference in the election ==
On 12 December 2024, Alexandru Musteață, the head of the SIS, stated that the parliamentary election was expected to face significant interference from Russia, warning that Moscow was likely to employ the tactics used during the 2024 presidential election and the EU referendum. These would include disinformation and manipulation campaigns, political and electoral corruption, and street protests and unrest. On 3 September 2025, after an interview with Moldova's energy minister Dorin Junghietu, Euronews reported that Moldovan officials were anticipating an intensification of disinformation campaigns and even attacks on the Moldovan energy system by Russia to increase tensions before the parliamentary election. On 24 September, Recean declared that Russia wanted "to take power in Chișinău, violating the sovereign will of the Moldovans" and stated that Moldova was pushing back firmly and that it would "thwart the Russian plan of occupation". He described Russian methods as increasingly radical, including involving criminal groups to prepare mass disorder, electoral corruption by Shor's criminal network, cyberattacks and mass disinformation. According to Agence France-Presse, analysts warned that Moldova had become a "testing ground" for Russia's information warfare in Europe.

A BBC News investigation found a network in Moldova which participants were promised to get paid if they posted pro-Russian propaganda and fake news undermining PAS ahead of the election. An investigation by Ziarul de Gardă reported that hundreds of accounts with false identities were created to spread Russian propaganda in TikTok and Facebook before the election, with many of these supporting Furtună's Greater Moldova Party (PMM). NordNews published an investigation in which members of the newspaper's team infiltrated one of the influence networks of the Russian NGO Evrazia controlled by Shor, even providing services for the Patriotic Bloc, Alternative and the PMM, "all to show you how Russia is trying to dictate who you should put your stamp on on 28 September".

On 22 September 2025, Bloomberg reported, citing European officials and documents of undisclosed origin, that Russia had prepared a plan to interfere in the Moldovan parliamentary election, which would include vote buying and transport of voters in the Moldovan diaspora, a disinformation campaign in both Romanian and Russian on social media (Facebook, Telegram, TikTok) and through call centres, the leak of compromising information about Moldovan officials, and provocations during the election and mass protests afterward carried out by youth from sports clubs and criminal groups. The next day, the Moldovan ambassador to Romania Victor Chirilă stated that Moldovans in France, Germany, Italy, Romania and the United Kingdom were being offered up to 100 euros for their vote. Furthermore, according to Reuters, Russia paid for Moldovan priests' trips to Moscow and gave them bank cards, to which money was sent in exchange of them creating Telegram channels, promoting anti-European ideas and criticizing the Moldovan authorities.

According to European officials cited by Bloomberg, for interfering in the election, Russia would have likely allocated an amount comparable to the money it used to interfere in the 2024 presidential election and EU referendum; that is, around 150 million euros, or approximately 1% of Moldova's GDP. According to Chirilă, if Russia would have invested almost 50 million euros to interfere in the Moldovan electoral period in 2024, for the 2025 election it would have invested over 300 million euros. Ukrainian journalist Dmitry Gordon, citing "documents leaked from the Kremlin", put this figure at 350 million dollars at least. Gordon also claimed that, in the case of a pro-Russian victory in the election, Russia would seek to capture Moldova's state institutions and that it was even considering to use Moldova to open a second front in its invasion of Ukraine, attacking Odesa Oblast with up to 40,000 contract soldiers from various regions that could be brought to Transnistria together with weapons and ammunition within a year as he reported. In a 24 September speech to the United Nations General Assembly (UNGA), Volodymyr Zelenskyy, the President of Ukraine, called on Western allies to step up support to Moldova to fight the growing Russian interference in its domestic politics. Zelenskyy argued that Belarus and Georgia had already fallen under Russian influence due to a lack of sustained international attention and stated "Europe cannot afford to lose Moldova too". Sandu later stated in 2026 that Russia had planned to turn Moldova into a "second Belarus" and use Moldovan territory against Ukraine and the EU.

In September, the European Digital Media Observatory reported that, in the final stretch of the campaign for the election, "the information warfare landscape continues to evolve with increasing intensity". In the run-up to the election, TikTok removed over 134,000 fake accounts, nearly 2 million fake followers, 1,173 accounts impersonating Moldovan officials and over 9,300 videos that violated rules on civic integrity, disinformation and content generation with artificial intelligence (AI); prevented 2.9 million fake likes, 1.8 million fake follow requests, and blocked the creation of over 268,000 spam accounts; and dismantled five coordinated networks with at least 7,593 accounts that "promoted pro-Russian politicians and attempted to discredit the current government". Furthermore, according to a study by the international analysis company OpenMinds published on the eve of the election, in Moldova, a third of all Telegram channels systematically spread Russian propaganda and one in eight comments came from bots. For its part, Telegram refused any collaboration with the Moldovan authorities against illegal activities in the platform such as vote buying. According to Liliana Vițu, the chair of Moldova's Audiovisual Council, the country was at "the mercy of the very big platforms", which she said were being used to spread Russian disinformation and narratives to destabilize the country. The EU took several measures to help counter cyberattacks and disinformation against Moldova, and in the United States, several bipartisan lawmakers expressed concern over the magnitude of Russia's interference in the Moldovan election. Romanian intelligence services also provided crucial support in the cybernetic field, as Romanian president Dan stated later in 2026. Allegedly, part of Russia's disinformation campaign were images spread by propagandists of fake LEGO sets portraying the Moldovan Armed Forces helping Ukraine.

On 11 September, Moldova's interior minister Daniella Misail-Nichitin stated that, since the beginning of the electoral campaign, around 2,000 searches had been carried out, multiple criminal cases had been opened including complaints about paid protests, and dozens of people had been detained. On 16 September, the CNA announced that over 20 million Moldovan lei had been seized during searches in Chișinău amid a case of illegal party financing. On 22 September, Moldovan police conducted raids across the country targeting those they suspected of "preparing Russia-backed disorder". There were over 250 searches conducted according to Moldpres. On 26 September, Serbian police announced the arrest of two people on suspicion of organizing training for 170 participants. The Moldovan government expressed its belief that the Russian military intelligence agency, the GRU, was involved.

For its part, Russia denied meddling in the election and accused the Moldovan government of spreading anti-Russian hysteria to win votes. On the day of the election, Dodon accused Sandu of planning to annul the vote, calling for protests in front of the parliament.

== Results ==
Results of the election, showing vote strength for each party by commune

Party	Votes	%	Seats	+/–
Party of Action and Solidarity	792,557	50.20	55	–8
Patriotic Electoral Bloc	381,984	24.20	26	–6
Alternative Bloc	125,706	7.96	8	New
Our Party	97,852	6.20	6	+6
Democracy at Home Party	88,679	5.62	6	+6
European Social Democratic Party	15,060	0.95	0	0
Coalition for Unity and Welfare	13,314	0.84	0	0
Respect Moldova Movement	10,144	0.64	0	0
League of Cities and Communes	6,120	0.39	0	0
Together Bloc	5,030	0.32	0	0
National Moldovan Party	4,813	0.30	0	0
Alliance of Liberals and Democrats for Europe	3,576	0.23	0	0
Moldovans Alliance	3,509	0.22	0	0
Christian-Social Union of Moldova	1,837	0.12	0	0
Alliance for the Union of Romanians	1,604	0.10	0	0
Liberal Party	1,591	0.10	0	0
New Historical Option	1,412	0.09	0	0
Unity of the Nation Bloc (endorsed PAS (Note: The BUN announced it had withdrawn from the election and endorsed PAS on 22 September, presenting a withdrawal request on 24 September. However, CEC vice president Pavel Postica stated the bloc did not withdraw officially and that its endorsement had only been a "political declaration", so the BUN remained on the ballot.))	797	0.05	0	0
Independents (Note: Andrei Năstase – 13,420, 0.85%; Olesea Stamate – 5,257, 0.33%; Victoria Sanduța – 2,862, 0.18%; Tatiana Crețu – 1,598, 0.10%)	23,137	1.47	0	0
Total	1,578,722	100.00	101	0
Valid votes	1,578,722	98.08		
Invalid/blank votes	30,857	1.92		
Total votes	1,609,579	100.00		
Registered voters/turnout	3,080,866	52.24		
Source: CEC, Agora

A significant part of the null votes were cast for the Greater Moldova Party (PMM), excluded two days before the election; these votes were not recorded separately, though they were not a majority of the null votes according to the CEC. One vote cast for the party in Tokyo, Japan, was initially counted as valid as the corresponding polling station approved the results of its vote count before the CEC issued its decision to annul votes for the PMM due to the time difference between Moldova and Japan, with the vote later being annulled as well.

Popular vote
PAS	50.20%
BEP	24.20%
BEA	7.96%
PN	6.20%
PPDA	5.62%
Others	5.82%

Parliamentary seats
PAS	54.46%
BEP	25.74%
BEA	7.92%
PN	5.94%
PPDA	5.94%

=== Results by administrative-territorial units ===
Territorial unit	Nr. of votes	Turnout	PAS	BEP	BA	PN	PPDA	Others
Chișinău Municipality	370,167	54.72	52.68	21.26	14.48	4.12	2.49	4.97
↳ Botanica Sector	73,590	53.79	45.02	27.19	17.32	3.85	2.00	4.62
↳ Buiucani Sector	54,591	55.16	53.93	20.87	14.47	3.93	2.07	4.73
↳ Centru Sector	47,191	57.47	53.49	20.96	13.63	4.37	2.17	5.38
↳ Ciocana Sector	53,730	53.76	53.95	20.68	14.75	3.90	2.33	4.39
↳ Rîșcani Sector	68,930	55.31	49.50	24.89	15.54	3.63	1.74	4.70
↳ municipality suburbs	72,135	53.81	61.11	12.69	10.94	4.99	4.34	5.93
Bălți Municipality	49,211	50.23	26.57	41.51	10.98	14.53	1.87	4.54
Anenii Noi	30,576	45.45	47.27	25.72	7.93	5.56	8.02	5.50
Basarabeasca	8,764	38.05	35.75	42.24	6.72	4.32	7.05	3.2
Briceni	22,570	39.83	27.01	48.48	6.79	6.18	5.36	6.28
Cahul	39,824	41.49	44.35	28.30	8.44	3.86	9.78	5.27
Cantemir	17,758	37.52	52.81	20.17	5.91	6.04	9.73	5.34
Călărași	25,092	43.54	59.36	16.19	4.72	5.64	7.33	6.77
Căușeni	29,580	43.12	49.54	22.99	4.29	4.59	12.25	6.34
Cimișlia	18,741	39.99	51.05	20.79	8.04	4.48	9.94	5.7
Criuleni	28,939	50.85	58.62	14.35	5.59	5.58	7.48	8.38
Dondușeni	14,608	49.44	25.25	48.12	7.24	7.17	5.89	6.33
Drochia	28,496	44.78	31.74	29.85	8.39	17.40	5.96	6.66
Dubăsari	12,741	45.02	39.94	31.29	10.91	6.55	5.65	5.66
Edineț	26,088	44.36	27.51	42.51	8.89	5.43	6.28	9.38
Fălești	30,873	46.38	30.53	27.58	5.36	23.43	4.54	8.56
Florești	29,853	45.72	37.68	28.60	8.07	9.74	6.89	9.02
Glodeni	19,288	44.21	31.37	31.09	14.66	13.00	5.19	4.69
Hîncești	37,979	40.33	58.02	13.85	5.92	5.04	9.89	7.28
Ialoveni	41,780	49.10	65.57	8.62	5.88	4.40	8.17	7.36
Leova	16,800	41.49	47.32	20.72	4.55	4.09	10.02	13.3
Nisporeni	21,209	41.27	57.56	11.07	4.70	7.25	8.79	10.63
Ocnița	17,006	45.96	20.67	52.22	8.59	4.96	5.80	7.76
Orhei	42,684	45.53	47.43	23.87	7.04	4.02	9.50	8.14
Rezina	16,685	46.60	47.01	23.10	6.19	5.45	9.79	8.47
Rîșcani	22,962	47.01	29.95	40.46	6.80	11.29	4.95	6.55
Sîngerei	28,939	43.62	43.05	27.30	5.49	10.71	7.4	6.05
Soroca	33,184	45.45	37.79	35.49	5.27	8.52	6.93	6.0
Strășeni	34,477	46.54	63.12	12.97	4.58	6.40	6.70	6.23
Șoldănești	14,105	47.06	39.79	25.57	4.17	7.73	12.13	10.61
Ștefan Vodă	22,672	42.67	47.02	23.71	4.55	4.83	10.10	9.77
Taraclia	15,565	47.69	6.10	79.51	10.51	0.69	0.72	2.47
Telenești	23,149	44.47	56.93	14.25	4.08	4.56	9.93	10.25
Ungheni	39,235	45.68	42.83	24.35	5.17	9.40	8.65	9.60
UTA Gagauzia	57,147	45.33	3.19	82.35	11.47	0.70	0.31	1.98
Left Bank of the Dniester	12,017	—N/a	29.89	51.02	8.91	2.92	2.36	4.9
Diaspora	277,964	—N/a	78.61	5.03	2.08	5.50	5.12	3.66
Total	1,578,728	52.21	50.20	24.17	7.96	6.20	5.62	5.85
Source: CEC

=== Analysis ===
PAS managed to win again a parliamentary majority, with 55 seats, down from the 63 it won in 2021. Thus, PAS, led de facto by president Sandu, maintained its hold on all power in Moldova. According to Moldovan journalist Ecaterina Dubasova, the main intrigue of the election's campaign was what would the result of PAS be and whether it would maintain a majority or need to seek coalition partners, with polls showing from a comfortable majority for the party to second place and even PAS entering the opposition. According to Dubasova, part of PAS' result was due to the usual support of the Moldovan diaspora, without which it risked not winning a majority. According to Moldovan diplomat and political analyst Alexei Tulbure, PAS managed to mobilize its traditional electorate to the maximum and attract part of the undecided, stating that "the alarmist tactic has worked". Dubasova noted that the main campaign promise of PAS was EU membership for Moldova by 2028.

Dubasova also stated that the entire pro-European camp of voters remained with PAS, noting that other clearly pro-European parties (PSDE, CUB, LOC, ALDE, MRM) had received less than 1% each, nowhere near the electoral threshold. She highlighted in particular that the Together bloc, which presented itself as an alternative to PAS, obtained fewer votes than independent candidates Andrei Năstase and even Olesea Stamate, who had only recently begun her independent political career. Moldovan political analyst Angela Colațchi stated that voters had bet on "the rational vote", voting for the pro-European party with chances of entering parliament.

Former defense minister Anatol Șalaru commented that the defeat of the pro-Russian parties in the election showed that the number of supporters of the "Russian world" in Moldova was decreasing, citing the example of Transnistria, where PAS obtained almost 30% of the vote. He stated that, while Russia "is always ready for any outcome", it wanted much more, it wanted a victory in Moldova after running out of victories in its invasion of Ukraine, "but little Moldova denied Russia of this, and they received a severe blow". Șalaru also asserted that Russia now had the problem of how to get rid of "expired" pro-Russian politicians that he said could no longer be "washed clean" and that Russia would need to look for new politicians and methods in Moldova.

For his part, Moldovan political analyst Andrei Curăraru stated that the election represented a battle lost by Russia in its hybrid war against Moldova, that he thought the results were very close to what pro-Russian parties would have obtained without any external interference and that these parties lost in some areas of the country where they traditionally won, which would indicate that Moldovans were becoming more pro-European. He also highlighted the "high-quality work" of the Moldovan police, the SIS, the National Anti-Corruption Center (CNA) and the Office of the Prosecutor General (PG), which he said appeared to have deterred many people from selling their vote.

Further, Dubasova stated that one of the election's surprises was Alternative's unexpectedly modest result. The bloc, informally led by Chișinău mayor Ion Ceban, obtained 7.96% of the nationwide vote and 14.48% in Chișinău, being behind PAS and the Patriotic Bloc in the capital despite Ceban having won in the first round the city's mayoral election in 2023. Moldovan political analyst Victor Juc cited as a possible reason for the bloc's result that voters vote differently in presidential, parliamentary and local elections, with them voting for a manager in local elections and for a specific political project in parliamentary ones. Dubasova, Juc and also Colațchi mentioned as well a lack of voter confidence in Ceban's pro-European orientation. According to Curăraru, PAC–CC leader Mark Tkachuk contributed enormously by himself to the loss of potential pro-European voters for Alternative. Following the election, there were several changes in Ceban's mayoral team, which experts believed, as described by Dubasova, could be related to Alternative's modest result in the parliamentary election.

Dubasova highlighted that Usatîi's PN had finally entered parliament, something the party had been trying to do for 11 years, since the 2014 parliamentary election. Colațchi noted that it would have been a serious failure for the party if it had failed to overcome the threshold again. Dubasova noted that, while the PN would not hold kingmaker status this time either, as PAS had already achieved a majority without its support, this would allow the PN to "play by its own rules", as any political alliance had cost Usatîi dearly to date as she stated. In addition, Dubasova stated the main surprise of the election was the result of Costiuc's PPDA; if polls had given the party 2–3% of the votes at most, it surpassed the 5% electoral threshold and entered parliament. A unionist party backed by AUR in Romania, campaigning on TikTok helped the PPDA gain visibility. Dubasova stated its surprising rise could be explained by the support of unionists, sovereigntists and undecided voters disappointed with PAS.

== Reactions ==
=== Domestic reactions ===
Following the victory of PAS, which she herself founded, President Sandu declared that Moldovans had demonstrated to the whole world that "we are brave and dignified" and that they had protected Moldova "through our honest vote", describing the result as a victory for Moldova and not only for PAS, as well as a strong mandate for EU accession. She celebrated that Moldovans had "decided for Moldova" despite all the money invested by Russia in the election, and said that she expected new provocations from Russia to deviate Moldova from its European path. Prime minister Recean stated that Moldovans had offered an "incredible lesson of dignity, courage and love of the nation", stating that PAS' victory was "difficult" but "extraordinary" considering the efforts by Russia together with criminal groups to "hijack the vote, scare people, try to divide society and sow hatred". PAS leader Igor Grosu stated "Moldova, I bow before you!", thanked Moldovans for resisting Russian interference that "seemed impossible to win" against and declared EU accession as Moldova's fundamental objective. He thanked the "second chance" for PAS, stating "we know and understand" that many voted the party only for Moldova's pro-European future and to avoid a pro-Russian parliament.

Dodon and other Patriotic Electoral Bloc leaders held a protest in front of the Moldovan parliament building the day after the election, questioning the election's results. Dodon, Tarlev and PSRM vice president Vlad Batrîncea called the election fraudulent, with Dodon stating "These elections have shown that PAS has lost again in the country. PAS is again winning thanks to the diaspora." and that the bloc had filed dozens of litigations to the CEC, to be examined in the next few days. People were promised money to attend this protest according to Moldovan police. Meanwhile, Vlah called the election "a farce, a spectacle in bad taste directed by PAS from beginning to end, with roles distributed in advance", stating that Moldova was "no longer a democratic state!" and that it was led by "a gang that has usurped power". For their part, Ceban stated "Thank you everyone! We respect the citizens' vote!", Stoianoglo thanked the citizens "regardless of their voting option", Usatîi acknowledged he had expected a better result for the PN and Costiuc stated "We can congratulate ourselves. [...] We did it, boys!" after the PPDA entered the parliament, with the party thanking voters for their vote of confidence.

=== International reactions ===
- Armenia: Prime Minister Nikol Pashinyan congratulated Sandu and Moldova's people on the election's outcome and their "strong dedication to advancing the European future of the country".
- Azerbaijan: President Ilham Aliyev congratulated Sandu on the victory of PAS at the election during a meeting with her in Copenhagen, Denmark, stating that the results reflected the will of the Moldovan people.
- Bulgaria: Prime Minister Rosen Zhelyazkov congratulated Sandu on the election's result, stating "Moldova has clearly and firmly chosen its European path" and that Bulgaria "will continue to support our friends in this important process toward a shared European future".
- Croatia: Prime Minister Andrej Plenković congratulated Sandu for the decisive victory in the election and stated that Croatia remained committed to supporting Moldova on its European path.
- Czech Republic: Prime Minister Petr Fiala stated "Great news from Moldova!... Voters in Moldova gave a clear stop to the pro-Russian parties.", stating this was hope also for Czechia and inciting Czechs to vote at the 2025 Czech parliamentary election next week and not "let the country fall to Russian collaborators".
- Estonia: Prime Minister Kristen Michal congratulated Sandu on the "convincing victory" and said Moldovans had "clearly chosen their European future".
- European Union:
  - European Commission president Ursula von der Leyen stated "Moldova, you've done it again. No attempt to sow fear or division could break your resolve."
  - European Council president António Costa stated that "The people of Moldova have spoken and their message is loud and clear. They chose democracy, reform, and a European future, in the face of pressure and interference from Russia. The EU stands with Moldova. Every step of the way."
  - European Parliament president Roberta Metsola stated that the future of Moldova was in Europe and that, "on this historic step forward", Moldovans had chosen the path to democracy, hope and opportunities.
  - High Representative Kaja Kallas stated that "Moldova's vote is a clear yes to a European future. Despite Russia's massive efforts to spread disinformation and buy votes, no force can stop a people committed to freedom. We stand with Moldova on their path to the EU."
  - European Commissioner for Enlargement Marta Kos congratulated Moldovans, stating that "today, the strength of Moldova's democracy resonates far beyond its borders" and that "despite an open assault on your elections, you withstood a flood of disinformation and interference".
  - European Parliament member Siegfried Mureșan stated that the election was a "lesson for all Europe on how to defend against Russian interference".
- Council of Europe: Secretary General Alain Berset congratulated Sandu on what he called a double victory, hers and that of the Moldovan people. He stated that the CoE remained committed to accompanying Moldova on its European path, the continuation of which he called a victory for Moldovans and democracy.
- France: President Emmanuel Macron declared that "Despite the attempts at interference and pressure, the choice of the people of the Republic of Moldova has asserted itself with force. France stands by Moldova in its European project and in its momentum of freedom and sovereignty."
- Georgia: Prime Minister Irakli Kobakhidze stated it would be "difficult" to congratulate Moldova for the results of the election as long as the country remained a member of the CIS, with him stating that the issue of congratulations could be reconsidered if Moldova left the CIS.
  - At the Georgian protests taking place at the time, the Moldovan flag was flown by some protestors who celebrated the pro-European victory in Moldova despite the heavy Russian interference. The flag became a symbol of resistance, with Polish political analyst Oktawian Milewski stating that it became a "protest symbol" and "I suspect, a symbol of Russia's defeat as well". The protests in Georgia broke out after the victory of the pro-Russian party Georgian Dream (GD), ruling since 2012, in the contested 2024 parliamentary election, which the opposition denounced as fraudulent. Protestors decried the party's crackdown on the opposition, civil society and independent media in Georgia. Ukrainian news website Euromaidan Press described GD as "what Moldova fought against".
- Germany: Chancellor Friedrich Merz congratulated the citizens of Moldova for their vote, "through which they firmly chose democracy." He reiterated Germany's support for Moldova's path to the EU.
- Latvia: President Edgars Rinkēvičs stated "Congratulations, Moldova! You have made a clear choice for freedom and democracy, and Moldova's European future shines brighter than ever".
- Poland:
  - Prime Minister Donald Tusk congratulated the Moldovan nation and Sandu personally on their courage and success in saving their country's democracy keeping to its European course and thwarting Russia's attempts to expand their control in the whole region as a result. He also stated that what happened in Moldova should be a lesson "to us all".
  - President Karol Nawrocki congratulated the victory of pro-Western forces in Moldova's parliamentary elections and reiterated Poland's support for Moldova's European integration.
- Romania:
  - President Nicușor Dan congratulated the citizens of Moldova "for the mobilization, and for the firm vote in the direction of continuing your country's European path." He congratulated the authorities and Sandu personally "for the good organization and conduct of the elections and for the way the threats were managed," and declared Romania's continued support for Moldova.
  - Prime Minister Ilie Bolojan congratulated Moldovans for their mobilization in the election and their pro-European vote, stating that Moldova's place was in the great European family and that "we will be with the Republic of Moldova on this path".
  - Senate President Mircea Abrudean gave a speech in the Senate congratulating Moldovans for the result of the election. Immediately after the speech, senators stood and applauded the election's outcome.
- Russia:
  - Kremlin spokesman Dmitry Peskov accused the Moldovan authorities of having prevented hundreds of thousands of Moldovans living in Russia from voting in the election by having made only two polling stations available to them. Asked whether Russia recognized the election's result, Peskov declared that some Moldovan political forces had talked about "violations".
  - Foreign ministry spokeswoman Maria Zakharova denied any interference by Russia in the election and accused the Moldovan authorities of "cynically" accusing Russia and not the EU of this, "feeding insinuations about a Russian threat that does not exist". She called the election "the dirtiest elections in the history of the republic", a "theater of the absurd", a "cheap spectacle" and an "operatic show", accusing the authorities of "medieval, barbaric methods of intimidation" of opponents, a widespread use of administrative resources, the use of force, threats, blackmail, extrajudicial mechanisms and the closure of independent media ("primarily that in the Russian language"), among others. Further, she accused the EU of "financial blackmail" to Moldovan voters to promote PAS.
- United Kingdom: Prime Minister Keir Starmer congratulated Sandu and stated "Despite Russia's attempts to undermine Moldova's democracy, the people of Moldova have chosen a path of freedom".
- United States: Congressman Carlos A. Giménez congratulated PAS shortly after the results came in stating: "From the U.S. Congress, we extend our congratulations to Maia Sandu who has once again secured a majority in parliament and will lead her nation's further integration with Europe, NATO, and western democracies."
- Ukraine: President Volodymyr Zelenskyy congratulated Sandu on the election results, stating on social media that "Russia's destabilising activity loses, while Moldova in Europe wins".

== Aftermath ==
Dodon had claimed victory in the election before the results even came in, thanking Moldovans for voting "in record numbers" and calling on PAS to leave power and for supporters of all opposition parties to take to the streets to defend their vote. Russian state media such as RIA Novosti had prepared an alternative narrative, alleging soon after the election that the opposition had won, setting the stage for a prolonged disinformation campaign to discredit the results and potentially plan for protests as political analyst Olga Lautman stated. On election night, Dodon called for protests outside the parliament on 29 September at 12:00 EEST "in defense of the popular choice", stating "The people have voted. And this choice must be respected." The German Marshall Fund described the protest as "modest" and "tightly policed", concluding that it failed to "generate real momentum". Members and supporters of the Patriotic Electoral Bloc declared at the protest they did not recognize the election results. Dodon and other bloc leaders disputed them, alleging that the electoral process had been corrupted and stating the bloc had filed dozens of litigations to the CEC. Attended by around 1,000 people, the protest lasted around 20 minutes, and the Moldovan police reported that people had been promised money to attend it or even bring participants to it. During the protest, 31 people, mostly residents from Transnistria, were taken to police stations for documentation amid vandalism and non-compliance with rules and obligations regarding public meetings and minors. The protest organized by Dodon was the only one publicly announced for the day after the election.

Police searches in Moldova continued after the election, with searches on 30 September over the illegal financing of parties and competitors in the election as well as money laundering. That day, Gabriel Călin, the leader of the Christian-Social Union of Moldova (UCSM), which had obtained 1,837 (0.12%) votes in the election, was detained over a case of illegal party financing and money laundering, with several members of the party being targeted by searches by law enforcement. Călin's predecessor as party leader, former defense minister Valeriu Pleșca, was also subject to searches on 25 November. Later, on 8 April 2026, Călin, being found guilty of money laundering and illegal party financing, was sentenced with a five-year suspended sentence, a five-year ban on engaging in activities related to political parties and on holding certain positions and a 650,000 lei fine.

Also on 30 September, Sandu stated that the measures taken by the Moldovan authorities to discourage vote buying in the election by the Shor group had worked, as far fewer votes had been bought compared to the 2024 EU referendum. Later, at the 7th European Political Community Summit on 2 October, she stated that Russia had spent hundreds of millions of euros in the parliamentary election to fund parties illegally in Moldova, also stating that, in the past two years only, Russia had assisted in creating at least seven new parties in the country. She would later state that Russia's expenses to interfere in the election had amounted to almost 2% of Moldova's GDP.

On 3 October, the CEC sanctioned the Democracy at Home Party (PPDA), which had won six seats, in response to complaints filed by PAS and the Moldovan police, with the party receiving a warning. The CEC's decision stated Democracy at Home had benefited from a promotional campaign on TikTok without declaring any expenses for online advertising, was illegally promoted by a foreign politician (George Simion from Romania), and constituted a "camouflaged electoral bloc" with the Alliance for the Union of Romanians (AUR)'s Moldovan branch (which ran separately in the election; led by Simion in Romania). Democracy at Home leader Vasile Costiuc in response claimed the TikTok content was created and distributed for free by supporters. The CEC in its decision left it to the Constitutional Court of Moldova to decide whether to annul or confirm the result Democracy at Home had obtained; Postica later clarified this had referred to validating the mandates of all parties that surpassed the electoral threshold, the annulment of the PPDA's mandates in particular never having been requested by the CEC. The CEC's sanctioning of the PPDA had also included making the party unable to receive subsidies from the state budget for its result obtained at the election for a year, but this was lifted on 9 October by the Central Court of Appeal. On 16 October, the Court validated the entire election, including the PPDA's six mandates. Costiuc thanked the people that had voted for the PPDA, stating "we will represent with dignity and great care" both those Moldovans who had voted for the party and those who had not.

=== Opening of the new parliament ===
The newly elected parliament opened on 22 October, and MPs formed six parliamentary groups. PAS formed the governing majority once again, while the remaining factions declared themselves in opposition. Igor Grosu (PAS) was re-elected President of the Parliament, while Doina Gherman (PAS) and Batrîncea (PSRM) were re-elected as deputy presidents. The Patriotic Electoral Bloc effectively dissolved when the PSRM and PCRM formed separate parliamentary groups, with PVM member Vasile Tarlev sitting as a non-affiliated deputy. All the other electoral lists formed parliamentary groups equivalent to the number of seats won in the election. Thus, PAS was represented by 55 deputies, PSRM by 17, PCRM and Alternative by 8 and PN and PPDA by 6, with Tarlev as a non-affiliate.

PAS parliamentary group members Dinu Plîngău and Stela Macari had previously announced they intended to leave the PAS group and become non-affiliates after the inauguration of the new government. They had been members of the Dignity and Truth Platform (also abbreviated PPDA) before the election. Nonetheless, Grosu stated on a Ziarul de Gardă interview published on 27 October that both would remain in the group even after a new government was formed, with Plîngău stating he would remain at least in the first 100 days of the new parliament. Plîngău and Macari had become part of the PAS list of candidates after a political partnership was signed in mid-July between the PAS and the PPDA. Plîngău had assured before that, even if he left the PAS group, he would continue supporting the pro-European majority in the parliament.

Election blocs and parliamentary groups
Election list	Parliamentary group	Party	Seats
PAS		PAS	37
PAS		Independents	18
PAS		Total	55
BEP	PSRM		17
BEP	PCRM		8
BEP	Non-affiliated	PVM	1
Alternative		MAN	3
Alternative		PCDM	2
Alternative		PAC–CC	1
Alternative		Independents	2
Alternative		Total	8
PN		PN	5
PN		Independents	1
PN		Total	6
PPDA			6

=== Government formation ===
Prime minister Recean announced on 13 October that he would not seek another term in office and would retire from politics to return to the private sector. In his place, Grosu announced on 14 October that PAS would nominate Alexandru Munteanu, an economist and businessman who previously worked at the World Bank and co-founded the American Chamber of Commerce in Moldova. A self-described "American of Moldovan origin" who had previously lived in the United States and Ukraine, Munteanu's nomination was described as a surprise by The Romania Journal; he had previously never been involved in politics, and had so far made discreet public appearances. Sandu officially nominated Munteanu as prime minister on 24 October, and he presented his list of ministers on 28 October, with about half of them having been part of the outgoing cabinet. His governing program focused on concluding Moldovan accession to the European Union, economic growth and modernization. The proposed government received the confidence of the parliament on 31 October, with all 55 PAS MPs voting in favor. Sandu formally swore in Munteanu and his cabinet on 1 November.

Cabinet changes
Office	Outgoing minister	Incoming minister
Prime Minister	Dorin Recean (Ind.)	Alexandru Munteanu (Ind.)
Deputy Prime Minister Minister of Economic Development and Digitalization	Doina Nistor (Ind.)	Eugen Osmochescu (Ind.)
Deputy Prime Minister for Reintegration	Roman Roșca (PAS)	Valeriu Chiveri (Ind.)
Minister of Culture	Sergiu Prodan (Ind.)	Cristian Jardan (Ind.)
Minister of Environment	Sergiu Lazarencu (PAS)	Gheorghe Hajder (PAS)
Minister of Finance	Victoria Belous (Ind.)	Andrian Gavriliță (Ind.)
Minister of Health	Ala Nemerenco (Ind.)	Emil Ceban (Ind.)
Minister of Justice	Veronica Mihailov-Moraru (Ind.)	Vladislav Cojuhari (Ind.)
Minister of Labour and Social Protection	Alexei Buzu (Ind.)	Natalia Plugaru (Ind.)
Deputy Prime Minister Minister of Infrastructure and Regional Development	Vladimir Bolea (PAS)	
Deputy Prime Minister Minister of Foreign Affairs	Mihai Popșoi (PAS)	
Deputy Prime Minister for European Integration	Cristina Gherasimov (Ind.)	
Minister of Agriculture and Food Industry	Ludmila Catlabuga (PAS)	
Minister of Defense	Anatolie Nosatîi (Ind.)	
Minister of Education and Research	Dan Perciun (PAS)	
Minister of Energy	Dorin Junghietu (Ind.)	
Minister of Internal Affairs	Daniella Misail-Nichitin (Ind.)	
Governor of Gagauzia	Ilia Uzun (Ind.) (acting)	
