= Heart of Moldova Party =

Heart of Moldova Republican Party Partidul Republican „Inima Moldovei”
- Abbreviation: PRIM
- Leader: Irina Vlah
- Founder: Irina Vlah
- Founded: 5 November 2024
- Registered: 2 December 2024
- Preceded by: Platform Moldova
- Headquarters: 24 31 August 1989 Street, Chișinău
- Membership (2025): 1,900
- Ideology: Social democracy Social conservatism Euroscepticism; Russophilia
- Political position: Left-wing
- National affiliation: Patriotic Electoral Bloc (July–October 2025)
- Colours: Orange; Light blue
- Slogan: "Choose with your heart" (Romanian: „Alege cu inima”)
- Parliament: 0 / 101

Website
- inimamoldovei.md

The Heart of Moldova Republican Party (Romanian: Partidul Republican „Inima Moldovei”; PRIM; lit. 'first') is a pro-Russian political party in Moldova founded by the former governor of Gagauzia and 2024 presidential candidate Irina Vlah. Earlier, in 2023, Irina Vlah founded the non-partisan political organization Platform Moldova. The party positions itself as left-conservative and advocating for diplomatic neutrality.

The party intended to run in the 2025 Moldovan parliamentary election as part of the Patriotic Electoral Bloc (BEP), but it was excluded from the election two days before it took place due to accusations of illegal financing of the party.

== History ==
=== Background ===
Irina Vlah began her political career in the Party of Communists of the Republic of Moldova (PCRM). From 2009 to 2014, Vlah represented the PCRM in Parliament, and in 2014 she left the communist faction, accusing them of collaborating with the then pro-European alliances. In 2015, she left the PCRM.

In 2015, with the support of the Party of Socialists of the Republic of Moldova (PSRM), Irina Vlah won the Gagauz gubernatorial election. In 2019, she was re-elected with a record percentage of over 91% of the votes.

=== Platform Moldova ===
On 16 November 2023, Irina Vlah created the non-partisan public organization Platform Moldova (Romanian: Platforma Moldova). In her announcement, she criticized the "unprecedented split in society and the distance between the pseudo-political elite and the people" and called on the opposition forces to Maia Sandu, both left-wing and right-wing, to unite.

=== Heart of Moldova Republican Party ===
Irina Vlah presented the name of her future party, Heart of Moldova Republican Party, at a press conference on 5 November 2024. The founding congress of PRIM took place on 16 November 2024. The PRIM party was officially registered on 2 December 2024 under number 83. The party plans to take part in the 2025 parliamentary election, also intending to initiate a referendum on the permanent neutrality of the Republic of Moldova by election day.

On 28 August, Canada announced it had introduced sanctions against 16 individuals, including Vlah, and two entities in Moldova as they were deemed responsible for Russian interference activities before the 2025 parliamentary election in Moldova. Later, on 5 September, Prime Minister Dorin Recean announced that Moldova's Interinstitutional Supervisory Council had decided to block funds and economic resources in Moldova belonging to Vlah, adding that "We will not tolerate national security being trampled on and turned into a plaything for Kremlin spokespeople". On 16 September, Vlah was banned from entering Lithuania for five years amid her ties to Russia and her support for Russian attempts at exerting influence over Moldovan politics as Lithuania's Ministry of Foreign Affairs declared. On 25 September, she was banned from entering three states: Poland, for a period of five years, since she was helping Russia interfere in the preparations for Moldova's parliamentary election according to Poland's Ministry of Foreign Affairs; Latvia, for an indefinite period; and Estonia, since her actions "violate the norms of international law and threaten peace and security" as Estonia's Minister of Foreign Affairs Margus Tsahkna stated, with Vlah having been included in the country's list of sanctioned people.

On 2 September, anti-corruption officials and prosecutors conducted raids in Chișinău and Comrat in the context of a case of illegal funding of the Heart of Moldova Party. As the National Anti-Corruption Center (CNA) stated that day, 17 people were suspects in the case, of whom 13 were under investigation and four others had been detained; the latter included three officials of the party's Comrat territorial organization and a deputy mayor of Comrat. In response, Vlah accused the government of exerting pressures. The same day, the National Moldovan Party (PNM) sent a request asking the Central Electoral Commission (CEC) to cancel the PRIM's registration in the election amid the party's illegal funding as it stated.

According to an investigation by Moldovan newspaper NordNews, a petition that the PRIM sent on 4 September to the Parliament of Moldova and the Ministry of Education and Research for the repair of the school in the village of Constantinovca and the road leading to it contained only a few authentic signatures out of a total of 62; most came from people who either were dead, did not live in the village or directly did not exist. The school administration and the Edineț District Council told NordNews they had not informed the authorities about the issues raised in the petition, and one of the villagers was surprised to find his name on it along with a signature that did not belong to him. The list of signatures was reportedly elaborated by PRIM member Aliona Pistriuga, then the 29th candidate on the Patriotic Bloc's list for the 2025 parliamentary election. Forging signatures and including false information in official documents constituted a crime under Moldovan law as law expert Alexandru Bot noted.

On 17 September, the CEC decided it would ask the Ministry of Justice to determine whether the activities of the PRIM should be restricted in the context of suspicions of illegal financing of the party. The CEC also issued a warning to the Patriotic Bloc due to the suspicions surrounding the PRIM and decided that it would carry out two financial audits, one for the PRIM and another for the bloc. On 19 September, the Central Court of Appeal was asked by the Ministry of Justice to restrict the activity of Vlah's PRIM for a year. On 25 September, the PRIM's activity was precautionarily limited by the Central Court of Appeal for the duration of the examination of its case until a verdict would be pronounced. This happened after a request, accepted by the Court on 23 September, by lawyer Fadei Nagacevschi on behalf of the PRIM to verify the constitutionality of the provisions of the law on the basis of which the Moldovan authorities requested that the PRIM's activity be limited, which the Supreme Court of Justice of Moldova (CSJ) declared inadmissible two days later. On 26 September, the CEC excluded the PRIM from the election due to accusations of illegal financing of the party, with the Patriotic Bloc being required to remove members of the PRIM from its list of candidates within 24 hours.

On 2 October, the CEC, invoking the legal limitation on the party's activity, barred the PRIM from participating in the local elections that were to take place on 16 November in the town of Leova and in five communes (Bașcalia, Călinești, Cremenciug, Natalievca and Ustia).

The exclusion of the PRIM drew concern from international election observers. The OSCE Office for Democratic Institutions and Human Rights (ODIHR) noted that the Ministry of Justice had requested the limitation of the party's activities following a CEC notification citing alleged illegal financing and ties to the unconstitutional Șor Party. ODIHR also noted that, following a complaint against the party, the CEC had concluded that it could not conclusively confirm serious violations of financing rules by the PRIM or the Patriotic Bloc, although reasonable suspicions remained regarding their funding. ODIHR stated that, given the timing, actions affecting the eligibility of the PRIM and the Greater Moldova Party undermined the legal certainty of electoral contestants and limited their right to seek effective remedy, at odds with international standards. It recommended that legal provisions be revised so that sanctions with irreversible effects on political rights, including the right to be elected, would be applied only when time allowed for effective legal remedies or suspended until appeals were exhausted, and that candidate deregistration be based on sound, relevant and sufficient evidence.

The Parliamentary Assembly of the Council of Europe (PACE) reported that the PRIM was removed close to election day on the basis of a Court of Appeal precautionary ruling limiting the party's activities for 12 months. PACE stated that, while the underlying allegations of illicit funding, voter bribery and ties to the banned Șor network were serious, the timing of the decisions, reliance on precautionary measures or security-service inputs, and limited transparency raised concerns about legal certainty, proportionality and equal opportunity for contestants. PACE further stated that many interlocutors viewed the removals as having the effect of restricting competition and voter choice, and recommended that any exclusion should rest on clear, publicly explained evidence and be resolved well before election day.

On 15 June 2026, Vlah was included together with five other individuals into the sanctions list of the European Union (EU) for actions aimed at "destabilizing, undermining or threatening the sovereignty, independence and democratic processes" of Moldova, with the Council of the European Union stating that Vlah had actively participated in actions to destabilize the democratic processes in the country before the 2025 parliamentary election.

== Ideology ==
Ideologically, the party is considered left-wing, and has also been described as socialist by Romanian right-wing news outlet Profit News. It calls itself "left of centre", adhering to a conservative doctrine." According to Irina Vlah, the "absolute priority" of the party is to ensure peace. In her presidential campaign, Irina Vlah positioned herself as the "president of peace".

Also, according to Vlah, the party's ideology reflects the programmatic points of its presidential program, such as "ending the demographic crisis, returning from dictatorship to democracy, pursuing a balanced foreign policy based on the interests of the state, ensuring an independent and professional justice system, a real fight against corruption, an economy based on investments, on clear and stimulating rules of the game, an effective system of social protection, new approaches in health care, education and culture, ensuring the settlement of the Transnistrian conflict."

PRIM leader Irina Vlah believed that 2025 would be an "extremely difficult" year due to the consequences of the energy crisis that year, which "will put even more pressure on already poor people". She denounced the liberal government of the Party of Action and Solidarity (PAS) as a "natural catastrophe", arguing that Moldova "has lost over 30,000 people in four years" and that "every third house in the villages is deserted". She stated that opposition to unification of Romania and Moldova is "the only way to save the country".

Irina Vlah calls herself pro-European, but emphasizes that Europe is "not about flags on buildings," but about social reforms. She calls for maintaining geopolitical neutrality and ties with both Europe and Russia. NewsMaker and Ziarul Național have described the party as pro-Russian. According to Moldovan political analyst Andrei Curăraru, both the PRIM and the Future of Moldova Party (PVM), with which it was within the Patriotic Electoral Bloc together with the PSRM and the PCRM at the time, had connections to Moldovan pro-Russian fugitive oligarch Ilan Shor.

== Criticism ==
Some Moldovan political scientists suspect Irina Vlah of being "part of the Kremlin's strategy" disguised as an ideologically pro-European candidate. PAS parliament member Radu Marian called Vlah's Platform Moldova project "Kremlin Platform".
