= Bloc of Communists and Socialists =

Electoral alliance in Moldova

Bloc of Communists and Socialists Blocul Comuniștilor și Socialiștilor
- Abbreviation: BCS
- Co-chairs: Vladimir Voronin (PCRM); Igor Dodon (PSRM)
- Electoral head: Vladimir Voronin
- Founded: 13 May 2021
- Dissolved: 11 July 2025 (Note: Date the 2021–2025 Moldovan parliament was dissolved.)
- Succeeded by: Patriotic Electoral Bloc
- Headquarters: Chișinău
- Ideology: Constituent parties: Communism (PCRM); Socialism (PSRM); Shared: Social conservatism; Russophilia
- Political position: Left-wing
- Constituent parties: PCRM; PSRM
- Colours: Red

The Bloc of Communists and Socialists (Romanian: Blocul Comuniștilor și Socialiștilor, BCS) was a pro-Russian electoral alliance between the Party of Communists of the Republic of Moldova (PCRM) and the Party of Socialists of the Republic of Moldova (PSRM). It was formed as the Electoral Bloc of Communists and Socialists (Romanian: Blocul electoral al Comuniștilor și Socialiștilor, BECS) ahead of the 2021 Moldovan parliamentary election.

== History ==
On 7 May 2021, PSRM president Igor Dodon announced that he had sent a letter to PCRM president Vladimir Voronin, proposing an electoral alliance between their two parties for that year's snap parliamentary election on 11 July. The proposal was approved by a majority of the PCRM's central committee on 11 May. A day later, PSRM deputy Corneliu Furculiță appeared on NTV Moldova and stated his party has almost unanimously approved the alliance, with a few members abstaining because they disagreed over certain aspects of the alliance. The Central Electoral Commission of Moldova (CEC) approved the request to form the Electoral Bloc of Communists and Socialists (BECS) on 13 May. That same day, Dodon announced that Voronin would head (be at the top of) the common ballot list of BECS, citing Voronin's political experience and reputation. Nonetheless, the CEC accepted both Voronin and Dodon as co-chairs of BECS.

In the 11 July 2021 snap election, BECS won 32 of the 101 seats in the Moldovan parliament, receiving 398,675 votes or roughly 27% of the popular vote. Dodon expressed disappointment at the result, saying, "We obviously wanted a higher overall percentage." He congratulated the rival Party of Action and Solidarity (PAS) but said his coalition would remain vigilant to avoid a "total monopoly on Moldovan politics" by one party. On 29 July, the elected BECS candidates were sworn in as deputies of the Bloc of Communists and Socialists (BCS).

Both constituent parties of the BCS supported Alexandr Stoianoglo in the second round of the 2024 presidential election. However, the PCRM initially endorsed Vasile Tarlev in the first round. Stoianoglo lost the second round with a little under 45% of the popular vote, compared to incumbent Maia Sandu's 55%. Voronin had previously argued in his endorsement of Stoianoglo that Sandu's victory would result in the end of Moldovan sovereignty, identity, and neutrality. His criticisms of Sandu came amid her accusations of Russian interference in the election.

On 28 March 2025, the BCS submitted a draft law against foreign agents, ostensibly to "ensure [government] transparency".

In the prelude to the 2025 parliamentary election, there were calls to expand the alliance to include Irina Vlah's Heart of Moldova Republican Party and Vasile Tarlev's Future of Moldova Party. The party leaders reached an agreement on 22 July, and the successor, the Patriotic Electoral Bloc, was registered on 3 August.

== Ideology ==
The BCS was socially conservative and targeted conservative segments of the Moldovan electorate. In the run up to the 2021 parliamentary election, the BCS characterised itself as supporting traditional family values and the rival PAS as pro-LGBT in contrast. It proposed amending the Moldovan constitution to explicitly ban same-sex marriages and define parents as one man and one woman. The BCS has nonetheless been described as a "left-wing coalition".

The BCS was also pro-Russian and anti-NATO. Dodon accused Western diplomats of interfering in the 2021 parliamentary election, while Voronin claimed "dusky children [would] be born in Moldova" if NATO stationed troops in the country, an apparent reference to African American soldiers.

== Election results ==
Parliamentary election results of the BCS
Election	Leader	Seats	Votes	Vote share	+/−	Outcome
2021	Vladimir Voronin	32 / 101	398,675	27.17%		Opposition (PAS majority)

Presidential election results of the BCS
Election	Candidate	First round		Second round		Result
Election	Candidate	Votes	%	Votes	%	Result
2024	Endorsed Alexandr Stoianoglo	401,726	25.98%	750,370	44.65%	Lost
