= Patriotic Electoral Bloc =

Political alliance in Moldova

Patriotic Electoral Bloc of Socialists, Communists, the Heart and Future of Moldova Blocul Electoral Patriotic al Socialiștilor, Comuniștilor, Inima și Viitorul Moldovei
- Abbreviation: BEP
- Founder: Igor Dodon; Irina Vlah; Vasile Tarlev
- Founded: 29 July 2025
- Registered: 3 August 2025
- Dissolved: 22 October 2025
- Preceded by: Bloc of Communists and Socialists
- Ideology: Russophilia; Euroscepticism
- Political position: Left-wing

The Patriotic Electoral Bloc (Romanian: Blocul Electoral Patriotic, BEP), officially the Patriotic Electoral Bloc of Socialists, Communists, the Heart and Future of Moldova (Romanian: Blocul Electoral Patriotic al Socialiștilor, Comuniștilor, Inima și Viitorul Moldovei), was a pro-Russian left-wing electoral alliance in Moldova, created to participate in the 2025 parliamentary election.

The bloc was composed of four parties: The Party of Communists of the Republic of Moldova (PCRM; led by Vladimir Voronin), the Party of Socialists of the Republic of Moldova (PSRM; led by Igor Dodon), the Future of Moldova Party (PVM; led by Vasile Tarlev) and the Heart of Moldova Party (PRIM; led by Irina Vlah). The latter was barred from participating in the election over accusations of illegal financing and excluded from the bloc's list of candidates two days before the election took place.

The bloc was disbanded on 22 October 2025, after the two largest member parties (PSRM and PCRM) had left to form separate parliamentary factions.

== History ==
=== Founding ===
On 4 June 2025, the For Moldova Platform was formed aiming to unite the opposition parties and later received support from the Party of Socialists (PSRM), the Party of Communists (PCRM) and the Future of Moldova Party (PVM). On 4 July 2025, PSRM leader Igor Dodon announced negotiations for a left-wing bloc. PCRM leader Vladimir Voronin later confirmed that the bloc would include the PSRM, PCRM, the PVM and the Heart of Moldova Party (PRIM). On 22 July, the leaders of the four parties announced an electoral bloc. The PCRM threatened to withdraw from the negotiations after demanding places 1 and 4 on the bloc's list "according to sources from within the bloc" as Moldovan journalist Tudor Ioniță stated, quoted by IPN Press Agency and Vocea Basarabiei.

A poll by IMAS in June 2025 saw a potential left-wing bloc composed of the four parties with 34.8%, above the ruling Party of Action and Solidarity (PAS) with 30%. The bloc was registered by the PSRM, the PRIM and the PVM on 3 August 2025. The PCRM also requested to join the bloc, and was admitted on 5 August. The communists proposed renaming the alliance upon their accession. In an interview published on 29 August by RFI România, Moldovan political analyst Andrei Curăraru stated that the PRIM and the PVM had connections to Moldovan pro-Russian fugitive oligarch Ilan Shor.

=== Electoral campaign and sanctions against Vlah ===
On 28 August, PRIM leader Irina Vlah was sanctioned by Canada amid alleged Russian interference activities before the election, and Moldova's Interinstitutional Supervisory Council decided to block her funds and economic resources in Moldova on 5 September. On 2 September, anti-corruption officials and prosecutors performed raids in Chișinău and Comrat concerning a case of illegal funding of the PRIM. Out of 17 suspects, 13 were under investigation and four others had been detained, the latter including three officials of PRIM's Comrat territorial organization and a deputy mayor of Comrat. Further, according to an investigation by Moldovan newspaper NordNews, a petition sent by the PRIM on 4 September requesting the repair of the village of Constantinovca's school and the road leading to it contained mostly false signatures. The school's administration and the Edineț District Council stated they had not reported the issues raised in the petition to the authorities. The list was reportedly elaborated by PRIM member Aliona Pistriuga, then the Patriotic Bloc's 29th person on its candidate list.

On 16 September, Vlah was prohibited from entering Lithuania for five years due to her alleged connections to Russia and support for Russian influence activities over the politics of Moldova. Posteriorly, on 25 September, she was banned from entering three countries: Poland, for five years, because she was helping Russia interfere in the preparations for the Moldovan parliamentary election according to the Polish Ministry of Foreign Affairs; Latvia, for an indefinite period; and Estonia, because her actions "violate the norms of international law and threaten peace and security" as the Estonian Minister of Foreign Affairs Margus Tsahkna stated, with Vlah having been included in the country's list of sanctioned people.

On 17 September, the Central Electoral Commission of Moldova (CEC) issued a warning to the Patriotic Bloc amid suspicions of illegal financing of the PRIM. The CEC also decided it would ask the Ministry of Justice to examine whether the PRIM's activities should be restricted and that it would carry out two financial audits, one for the PRIM and another for the bloc. The Ministry of Justice requested the Central Court of Appeal to limit the activity of Vlah's PRIM for a year on 19 September. On 22 September, Dodon reported that the homes of PSRM colleagues in northern Moldova had been searched and that four or five people had been detained, including the vice president of the PSRM's organization in Rîșcani District. That day, over 250 searches across over 100 Moldovan localities were carried out by the Moldovan Police and agents from other institutions amid a criminal case opened for the preparation of "mass disorder and destabilization" coordinated from Russia through criminal elements. Dodon also stated that day that protests would take place if the PRIM's activity was limited.

On 25 September, the Central Court of Appeal precautionarily limited the PRIM's activity for the duration of the examination of its case until a verdict would be pronounced. This took place following a request, accepted by the Court on 23 September, by lawyer Fadei Nagacevschi on the PRIM's behalf to verify the constitutionality of the provisions of the law on the basis of which the Moldovan authorities requested the limitation of the PRIM's activity, which the Supreme Court of Justice (CSJ) declared inadmissible two days later. Dodon reacted by promising that if Vlah and her colleagues were excluded from the Patriotic Bloc's list and the bloc managed to form a parliamentary majority, Vlah would be included in the new government. On 26 September, the CEC excluded the PRIM from the election amid accusations of illegal financing of the party, and the Patriotic Bloc was required to remove members of the PRIM from its list of candidates within 24 hours. Members and supporters of the bloc organized a protest over the decision at the CEC's headquarters. That same day, Moldovan newspaper Deschide.MD published alleged audio recordings from closed groups of Shor's network in which it was stated that, a few days earlier, Shor had personally ordered that the network's sympathizers be mobilized to vote for the Patriotic Bloc.

=== Dissolution ===
On 10 October 2025, the PCRM announced it intended to leave the bloc and form a separate parliamentary faction. However, the party reaffirmed its commitment to collaboration with the other members of the bloc. The PVM condemned this decision, calling for unity and dialogue. Despite these objections, the PCRM officially left the bloc on 18 October. On 21 October, the PSRM also left the bloc and formed its own parliamentary faction. The next day, PVM leader and sole MP Tarlev, though declaring himself disappointed by the decisions of his former allies and committed to the ideas of the Patriotic Bloc, also decided to leave. The bloc was officially disbanded on the same day.

== Positions ==
The bloc has been widely described as pro-Russian. It supported closer cooperation with Russia, seeking the resumption of "mutually beneficial relations" with Russia and a strategic partnership with the country. In its political platform, the bloc established as foreign policy objectives the construction of a balanced and open diplomacy with countries of both the West and East, also seeking good neighborly relations and pragmatic cooperation with Romania and Ukraine.

The bloc proposed in its platform a plan for rapprochement with the Commonwealth of Independent States (CIS), aiming to restore economic relations with CIS member states by resuming the cooperation agreements denounced in recent years. The bloc also expressed its openness to cooperation with BRICS and the Shanghai Cooperation Organisation (SCO) and proposed restoring Moldova's observer status in the Eurasian Economic Union (EEU) and the accession of Moldova to the Belt and Road Initiative and regional projects in Eastern Europe and Central Asia. The bloc also emphasized the importance of developing a strategic partnership with China, described as one of the world's largest economies. This enhanced relationship with the country would include the signing of a strategic partnership agreement.

In its platform, the BEP described that it sought a "balanced relationship" with the European Union (EU), with Moldovan newspaper Ziarul de Gardă noting that its platform did not publicly endorse an end to European integration. Nevertheless, the bloc was described as opposed to the EU and European integration by the Polish government-funded think tank of the Centre for Eastern Studies (OSW) and by Romanian news site Veridica's Moldovan edition. According to the OSW, the bloc criticised values promoted by the EU as allegedly incompatible with Moldovan values; EU values would be characterised by the bloc as openly hostile to Eastern Orthodox tradition, which would be the cultural core of Moldova. According to Veridica, all four party leaders of the BEP promoted messages against Moldova's accession to the EU, as well as falsehoods about the EU and NATO.

The bloc advocated for Moldovan neutrality and called for restraint from involvement in the Russo-Ukrainian War, not formally supporting Russian aggression. Bloc representatives stated that, if they were to come to power, they would propose the adoption of a law on permanent neutrality that would "complete" the Constitution of Moldova and be recognized internationally, including by the United Nations (UN). Furthermore, the BEP stated that 51 military objectives would be constructed through the use of over 700 million Moldovan lei from the state budget and also through the attraction of external financing for the purchase of weapons.

== Former members ==
| Party | Abbr. | Ideology | Leader | Candidates | Elected MPs | Member since | Until |
|---|---|---|---|---|---|---|---|
| Party of Socialists of the Republic of Moldova | PSRM | Democratic socialism Social conservatism | Igor Dodon | 50 / 80 | 17 / 26 | 29 July 2025 | 21 October 2025 |
| Party of Communists of the Republic of Moldova | PCRM | Marxism–Leninism; Social conservatism | Vladimir Voronin | 24 / 80 | 8 / 26 | 5 August 2025 | 18 October 2025 |
| Future of Moldova Party | PVM | Left-wing populism Left-wing nationalism | Vasile Tarlev | 6 / 80 | 1 / 26 | 29 July 2025 | 22 October 2025 |
| Heart of Moldova Republican Party (barred) | PRIM | Social democracy Conservatism | Irina Vlah | 0 / 80 (barred) | 0 / 26 (barred) | 29 July 2025 | 22 October 2025 (Note: The bloc was disbanded at this date, the party did not officially leave.) |

== Election results ==
=== Parliament ===
| Election | Leader | Performance | | | | | Rank | Government |
| Election | Leader | Votes | % | ± pp | Seats | +/– | Rank | Government |
|---|---|---|---|---|---|---|---|---|
| 2025 | Igor Dodon | 381,505 | 24.17% | New | 26 / 101 | New | 2nd | Opposition |

== See also ==
- Bloc of Communists and Socialists (2021–2025)
