= Inna Șupac =

Moldovan politician (born 1984)

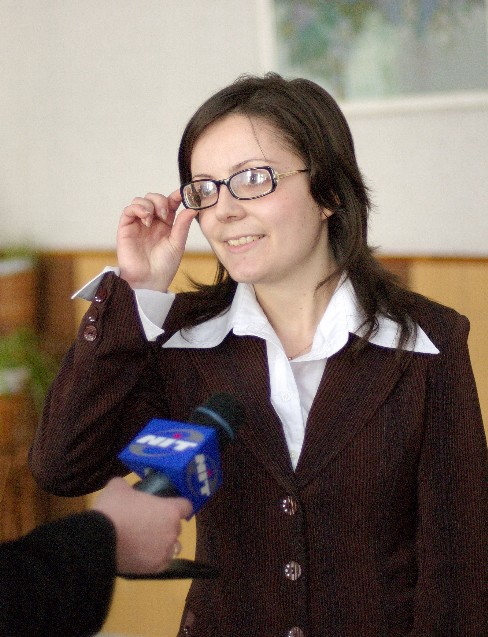
- Șupac in 2010

Member of the Moldovan Parliament
- In office 11 May 2015 – 9 March 2019
- Preceded by: Irina Vlah
- Parliamentary group: Party of Communists
- In office 22 April 2009 – 9 December 2014
- Parliamentary group: Party of Communists

Personal details
- Born: 9 February 1984 (age 42) Basarabeasca, Moldavian SSR, Soviet Union

Inna Șupac (born 9 February 1984) is a Moldovan civil activist and former politician who served as a member of the Moldovan Parliament for 10 years (2009 - 2019).

Șupac has a degree in international relations from the Free International University of Moldova (2002–2006). From October 2006 to October 2007, she studied at the European Institute of Political Science in Moldova, and between October 2007 and September 2008 she did a master's degree in anthropology at the Higher Anthropological School of Moldova.

In May 2006, she was recognized as one of the best students in Moldova, having received the 1st grade of Bursa de Merit scholarship, established by the Council of Rectors of the Republic of Moldova with the support of the Soros Foundation Moldova.

After graduation, she completed an internship at the European Parliament in Brussels and Strasbourg. After returning from Europe, she worked in the Office of the President of the Republic of Moldova.

For 10 years, from 2009 to 2019, she was a member of the Parliament of the Republic of Moldova. She is an author and co-author of more than 70 legislative initiatives in the field of democratization, transparency, human rights, education, mass-media. During her parliamentary activity, she held various functions: Vice-chairwoman of the European Union - Moldova Parliamentary Cooperation Committee (2011-2014), Member of the Standing Bureau of the Parliament (2016-2019), Member of the Parliamentary Assembly of the Council of Europe (2018 – 2019).

During her parliamentary activities, she used various platforms, including PACE, to draw the attention of the international community to the need to condemn the oligarchic regime of Vladimir Plahotniuc, who captured the state.

She is an alumna of the European Union Visitors Program 2018.

In 2019, she suspended her political activities, switching to civil society. From June 2019 to June 2022, she held the position of Executive Director of the Moldovan Institute for Strategic Initiatives (IPIS), then continued to work in this NGO as an expert

In 2021, she co-hosted the political talk-show “What Was It?” on the Moldovan TV channel TV8.

Currently she is a research fellow at the Academy of International Affairs NRW (Bonn, Germany).
