= Irina Vlah =

Moldovan politician (born 1974)

- İrina Vlah
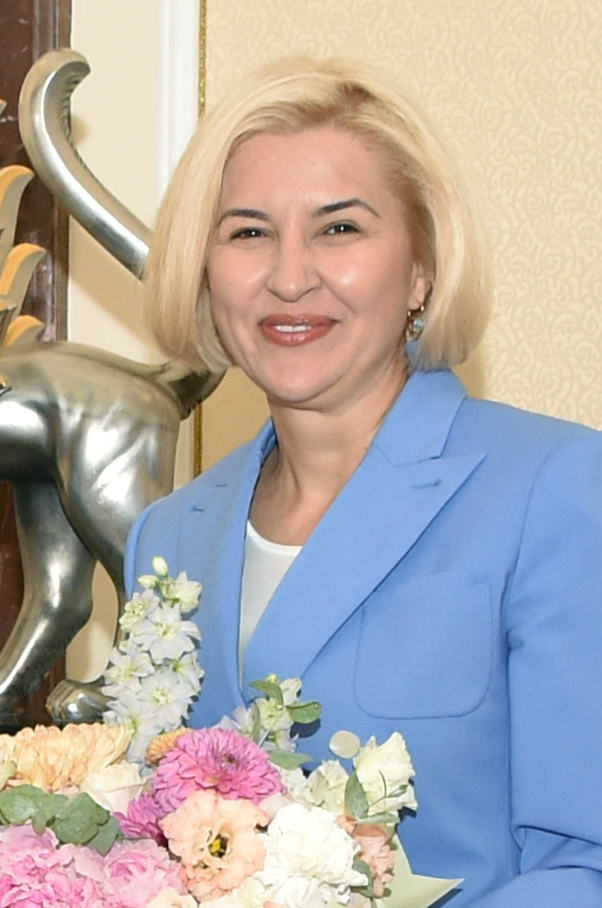
- Vlah in 2021

President of the Heart of Moldova Party
- Incumbent
- Assumed office 2 December 2024
- Preceded by: Party established

Governor of Gagauzia
- In office 15 April 2015 – 19 July 2023
- Preceded by: Mihail Formuzal
- Succeeded by: Evghenia Guțul

Member of the Moldovan Parliament
- In office 17 March 2005 – 30 April 2015
- Succeeded by: Inna Șupac
- Parliamentary group: Party of Communists

Personal details
- Born: Irina Fiodorovna Vlah; 26 February 1974 (age 52) Comrat, Moldavian SSR, Soviet Union (now Gagauzia, Moldova)
- Party: PRIM (since 2024)
- Other political affiliations: PCRM (2005–2015); Independent (2015–2024)
- Children: 1
- Education: Comrat State University; Academy of Sciences of Moldova
- Awards: Order of Honour (2019)

Irina Fiodorovna Vlah (Gagauz: İrina Vlah; Russian: Ирина Фёдоровна Влах, romanized: Irina Fyodorovna Vlakh; born 26 February 1974) is a Moldovan politician. She served as the governor of Gagauzia from 2015 to 2023 and as a member of the Moldovan parliament from 2005 to 2015. She was the first woman to lead the Autonomous Territorial Unit of Gagauzia.

In 2025 and 2026, Vlah was subject to sanctions in Canada and the European Union (EU) and was banned from entering Lithuania, Poland, Latvia and Estonia due to actions of Russian interference before the 2025 Moldovan parliamentary election, while the Moldovan authorities blocked bank accounts belonging to her. Furthermore, her party, the Heart of Moldova Republican Party (PRIM), which had made part of the Patriotic Electoral Bloc (BEP), was excluded from the election two days before it took place amid illegal financing accusations.

== Early life ==
Irina Vlah was born on 26 February 1974 in Comrat into family of state employees. She is of mixed Gagauz and Bulgarian descent.

From 1991 to 1996 she studied at the Comrat State University at the Faculty of Law. From 2001 to 2008 she was a doctoral student at the Academy of Sciences of Moldova and defended her PhD thesis on the topic "The modern concept of the development of the civil service in the Republic of Moldova".

== Political career ==
Vlah became a lawyer in 1996, working at the tax inspectorate.

Between 2003 and 2005, she headed the legal department of the executive committee of Gagauzia.

=== Member of Parliament ===
Vlah successfully ran for the Moldovan Parliament in 2005. Five years later, she was appointed to the executive committee of the Party of Socialists of the Republic of Moldova.

=== Governor of Gagauzia ===
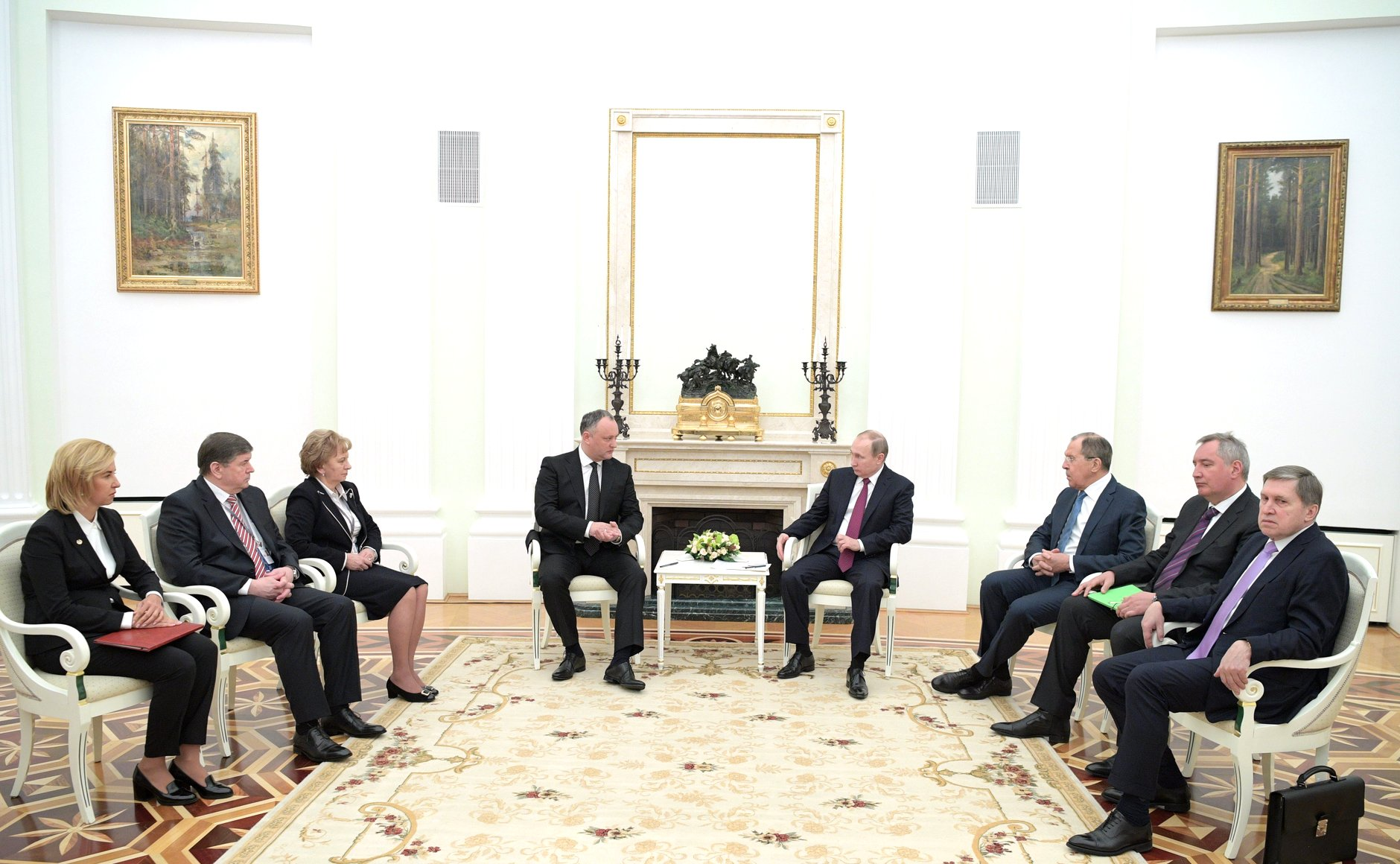
Vlah (far left) at a meeting with Russian President Vladimir Putin in 2017 with other top-ranking Moldovan Russophiles

In 2015, Vlah ran to become Head of Gagauzia. On 22 March, she was declared the winner of the election in the first round, gaining an absolute majority of the votes. She took her oath of office on 15 April, becoming the first woman to hold the position. Moldovan President Nicolae Timofti appointed Vlah as an ex-officio member of the nation's cabinet and granted her a seat on the Supreme Security Council.

In 2019, she was re-elected as Head of Gagauzia in a landslide, achieving the largest win in the region's modern history.

On 4 March 2021, Vlah was removed from the Supreme Security Council amidst a reshuffle.

Vlah was unable to seek election to a third term due to term limits and was replaced in 2023 by Evghenia Guțul.

=== 2024 presidential and 2025 parliamentary campaigns and sanctions ===
Vlah's 2024 presidential campaign logo

On 29 September 2024, Vlah announced she would be running for president as an independent. In her announcement speech she criticized closer ties between Moldova and NATO and increased defense spending and stated Moldova must be "neutral." She has also stated that it necessary to "maintain ties with the CIS countries, for the benefit of our businesses and compatriots."

Vlah claimed she was being harassed by the Moldovan police when she attempted to hold a campaign rally in Naslavcea in a restricted portion of the Moldova-Ukraine border without permission from Moldovan border guards. The police criticized her claims as "groundless, manipulating and of disparagement" and that the border-guard post she was attempting to campaign at was a clearly restricted area and that by publishing the uncensored face of the officer who turned her away was attempting to intimidate the police.

After losing the election, Vlah set up the Heart of Moldova Republican Party (PRIM). On 28 August 2025, Canada announced it had introduced sanctions against Vlah, 15 other individuals and two entities in Moldova as they were deemed responsible for actions of Russian interference before the 2025 Moldovan parliamentary election. Afterwards, Prime Minister Dorin Recean announced on 5 September that Moldova's Interinstitutional Supervisory Council had decided to block funds and economic resources in Moldova belonging to Vlah, adding that "We will not tolerate national security being trampled on and turned into a plaything for Kremlin spokespeople". Thus, the State Fiscal Service (SFS) blocked five bank accounts belonging to Vlah on 16 September.

Also on 16 September, Lithuania banned Vlah from entering the country for five years due to her ties to Russia and her support for Russian attempts at exerting influence over Moldovan politics as the Ministry of Foreign Affairs of Lithuania stated. Later, on 25 September, she was banned from entering three countries: Poland, for a period of five years, since, as the Polish Ministry of Foreign Affairs stated, she was helping Russia interfere in the preparations for the Moldovan parliamentary election; Latvia, for an indefinite period; and Estonia, since her actions "violate the norms of international law and threaten peace and security" according to the Estonian Minister of Foreign Affairs Margus Tsahkna, with Vlah having been included in Estonia's list of sanctioned people.

On 25 September, the Central Court of Appeal precautionarily limited the activity of the PRIM for the duration of the examination of its case until a verdict would be pronounced, and on 26 September, two days before the parliamentary election, the Central Electoral Commission (CEC) excluded the PRIM from the election amid accusations of illegal financing of the party. Thus, the Patriotic Electoral Bloc (BEP), which the PRIM had been a member of, was required to remove PRIM members from its list of candidates within 24 hours. Igor Dodon, leader of the Party of Socialists of the Republic of Moldova (PSRM) also part of the bloc, had already stated that, in such a scenario and in the case that the bloc managed to form a parliamentary majority after the election, Vlah would be included in the new government.

On 15 June 2026, Vlah and five other individuals were included on the sanctions list of the European Union (EU) for actions aimed at "destabilizing, undermining or threatening the sovereignty, independence and democratic processes" of Moldova. As the Council of the European Union justified, Vlah had actively participated in actions to destabilize the democratic processes in the country before the 2025 parliamentary election.

== Honours and accolades ==
- Russia: Jubilee Medal "In Commemoration of the 100th Anniversary of the Restoration of the Patriarchate in the Russian Orthodox Church" (2018)
- Moldova: Order of Honor (2019)
- Azerbaijan: Friend of Azerbaijan Golden Order (2019)
