= Future of Moldova Party =

Political party in Moldova

Future of Moldova Party Partidul Viitorul Moldovei
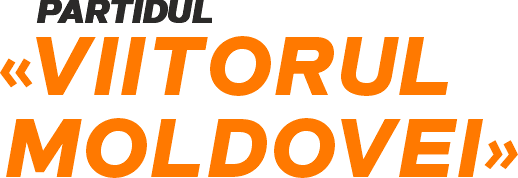
- Abbreviation: PVM
- Chairman: Vasile Tarlev
- Founder: Vasile Tarlev; Vasile Mereuță
- Founded: 27 August 2022
- Registered: 25 November 2022
- Preceded by: Our Budjak
- Headquarters: 119 Stephen the Great Boulevard, Chișinău
- Membership (2025): 3,858
- Ideology: Left-wing populism Left-wing nationalism Russophilia
- Political position: Left-wing
- National affiliation: Patriotic Electoral Bloc (July–October 2025)
- Colours: Orange
- Parliament: 1 / 101
- District Presidents: 0 / 32

Website
- viitorulmoldovei.md

The Future of Moldova Party (Romanian: Partidul Viitorul Moldovei; PVM) is a political party in Moldova, led by former Prime Minister Vasile Tarlev. The party was formed in February 2024 on the basis of the Our Budjak (Romanian: Bugeacul Nostru) party, which was founded in August 2022.

== History ==
=== Background ===
In 2001-2008 Vasile Tarlev served as Prime Minister during the presidency of Vladimir Voronin, heading the PCRM government. In March 2008 Tarlev resigned, and on 27 September 2008 he became the chairman of the opposition Centrist Union of Moldova. Following the electoral failures in the April 2009 and the July 2009 parliamentary elections, on 19 November 2009, Vasile Tarlev announced his resignation from the Centrist Union of Moldova and from politics, stating that he would engage in business and scientific work.

In 2012, Tarlev became co-chairman of the new Revival party. Tarlev headed the Revival party list for the 2014 parliamentary election. In the election, the party received 0.26% of the votes. In August 2016, Tarlev again announced that he had left politics and was not a member of any party. In the autumn of 2016 Tarlev attempted to run for president as an independent candidate, but his candidacy was rejected by the Central Electoral Commission, citing inconsistencies in the documents submitted.

=== Foundation ===
The legal predecessor of the Future of Moldova Party was the Gagauzia-based party Our Budjak (Romanian: Bugeacul Nostru), formed on 27 August 2022 and registered on 25 November 2022. The party was headed by Valerii Ianioglo, Acting Governor of Gagauzia in 2002 and First Deputy Chairman of the Executive Committee of Gagauzia in 1999–2003 and 2007–2019.

In February 2024, Tarlev announced his return to politics. On 9 February 2024, a congress was held at which Our Budjak was renamed Future of Moldova Party, and Vasile Tarlev became its leader. The congress elected the governing bodies and adopted the PVM's charter and program. The party was officially registered by the Public Services Agency with a new name, charter and leadership on 22 March 2024 and was publicly presented at the press conference on 2 April 2024.

=== 2024 presidential election ===
On 24 July 2024, PVM leader Vasile Tarlev announced his intention to run as an independent candidate for the presidency. On 21 August 2024 he submitted the necessary documents to the Central Electoral Commission to register an initiative group. The CEC rejected his first application, but on August 31, Tarlev again submitted a package of documents to register an initiative group, this time on behalf of the Future of Moldova Party. Tarlev was officially registered as presidential candidate on 18 September 2024. In the 2024 presidential election, Tarlev received 3.19% of the votes. In the second round, he called for voting against the incumbent President Maia Sandu.

=== 2025 parliamentary election ===
Before the 2025 parliamentary election, Vasile Tarlev supported the idea of creating an electoral platform "Pentru Moldova" together with Party of Socialists (PSRM) and Party of Communists (PCRM), stating "only the solidarity of the opposition can ensure fair parliamentary elections in the Republic of Moldova".

== Ideology ==
According to Ion Tăbârță, an expert at Radio Moldova, Future of Moldova Party "gravitates towards the left-wing of national politics, but intends to attract the votes of the center-right electorate". The PVM plan includes initiatives to bolster the real sector and support domestic producers.

At the founding congress of PVM, Vasile Tarlev stated that he is "not against the European path" of Moldova, but believes that the country should be "where our national interest is."

Tarlev heads the Friends of Russia in Moldova group and put forward his presidential platform of friendship with Russia. Deutsche Welle and Ziarul Național have described the party as pro-Russian. According to Moldovan political analyst Andrei Curăraru, both the PVM and the Heart of Moldova Party (PRIM), with which it was within the Patriotic Electoral Bloc together with the PSRM and the PCRM at the time, had connections to Moldovan pro-Russian fugitive oligarch Ilan Shor.

== Criticism ==
Vasile Mereuță, who was presented as vice-chairman of the party on a press conference in April 2024, subsequently left the party and in July 2024 accused Tarlev of being "Ilan Șor's man" and stated that "Tarlev does not want to be president, he just wants to collect money." Tarlev responded by stating that he "does not know and does not remember" Mereuță.

== Election results ==
=== President ===
Election	Candidate	First round		Second round		Result
Election	Candidate	Votes	%	Votes	%	Result
2024	Vasile Tarlev (Note: Also endorsed by the Party of Communists)	49,316	3.19%	Against Maia Sandu		Lost ✗

=== Parliament ===
Election	Leader	Performance					Rank	Government
Election	Leader	Votes	%	± pp	Seats	+/–	Rank	Government
2025	Vasile Tarlev	381,505	24.17% (BEP)	New	1 / 101	New	2nd	Opposition
