= New Historical Option =

New Historical Option Noua Opțiune Istorică
- President: Svetlana Chesari; Dmitri Torner
- Headquarters: 22 Nicolae Iorga Street, Chișinău
- Ideology: Centrism; Moderate conservatism
- Political position: Centre

Website
- www.ppnoi.md

NOI – New Historical Option (Romanian: Noua Opțiune Istorică, NOI) is a political party in the Republic of Moldova with a centrist-conservative orientation. The party advocates for a balanced approach that preserves national identity and traditional values while promoting economic and social development.

== History ==
The party resumed its active political activity in 2021 during its 9th Congress, when Svetlana Chesari was elected president. Under her leadership, the party participated in the early parliamentary elections on July 11, 2021. The platform emphasized social solidarity and progress, as well as Moldova’s disengagement from regional geopolitical conflicts, encouraging peaceful negotiations between major global powers. Chesari became the focus of public attention in 2017, when the National Anti-Corruption Center (CNA) retained her over a case concerning the embezzlement of European funds. For the election, NOI's leadership attempted to change the party's name to the Alternatives and Chances Party (PAȘ), which the Central Electoral Commission of Moldova (CEC) rejected, arguing that the party's new electoral symbol was almost identical to that of the Party of Action and Solidarity (PAS).

In 2025, during its 10th Congress, the party leadership was expanded to include businessman Dmitri Torner, who supports a capital amnesty initiative. Torner, formerly known as Dmitri Nekrasov, had previously received an 11-year prison sentence in Moldova for fraud, later escaping and becoming a wanted person in two countries; he also changed his name four times, married three times and was even declared dead on paper once. He ran as a candidate for the 2019 Ukrainian parliamentary election, being 44th on the list of candidates for the pro-Russian party Opposition Platform – For Life.

== Ideology and objectives ==
The NOI party supports reforms to the economic and legal framework, including amendments to the Criminal Code, aiming to eliminate provisions that may serve as tools of pressure on economic agents. The party also promotes a strategic plan to integrate Moldova into the Global Innovation System, arguing that the necessary technological and financial conditions already exist to implement it successfully.

== Leadership ==
- Svetlana Chesari, President
- Dmitri Torner, Leadership member
