= Corneliu Furculiță =

Moldovan politician (born 1969)

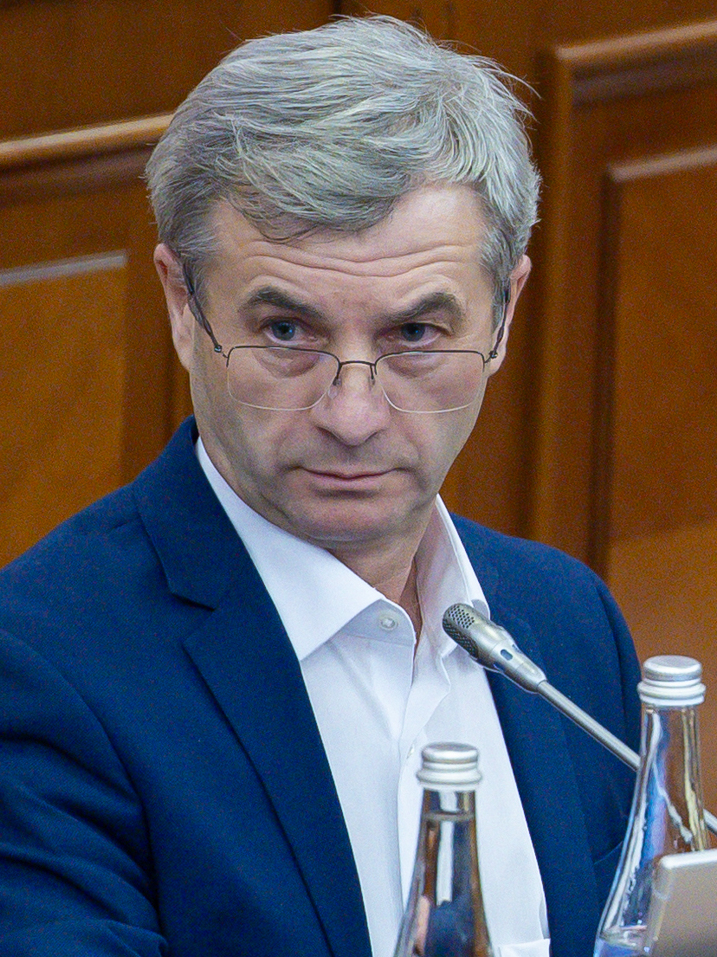
- Furculiță in 2024

Member of the Moldovan Parliament
- In office 9 December 2014 – 16 October 2025
- Parliamentary group: Party of Socialists; Bloc of Communists and Socialists

Personal details
- Born: Sadova, Moldavian SSR, Soviet Union
- Education: Moldova State University

Corneliu Furculiță (born 30 June 1969) is a Moldovan politician, member of the Moldovan Parliament from 2014 until 2025.
