= Sadova, Călărași =

Sadova
- Village
- Location within Moldova
- Coordinates: 47.1891666667°N 28.35°E
- Country: Moldova
- District: Călărași District

Government
  - Mayor: Vladimir Susarenco (Independent)

Population (2014 census)
  - Total: 2,191
- Time zone: UTC+2 (EET)
  - Summer (DST): UTC+3 (EEST)

Sadova is a village in Călărași District, Moldova.

== Notable people ==
- Igor Dodon
- Corneliu Furculiță
