= Ustia, Glodeni =

Ustia
- Village
- Location within Moldova
- Coordinates: 47.6605555556°N 27.5872222222°E
- Country: Moldova
- District: Glodeni District

Government
  - Mayor: Alexandru Cojocari (PDM)

Population (2014 census)
  - Total: 1,660
- Time zone: UTC+2 (EET)
  - Summer (DST): UTC+3 (EEST)

Ustia is a village in Glodeni District, Moldova.
