= Moldovans in Romania =

Citizens of the Republic of Moldova in Romania

Moldovans in Romania Moldoveni în România
Total population
- 285,000 (mid-2020)

Regions with significant populations
- Region of Western Moldavia and large urban areas

Languages
- Romanian

Religion
- Mainly Eastern Orthodox

Moldovans in Romania include the people born in the Republic of Moldova living in Romania and their descendants. The largest group of immigrants in Romania are from Moldova. Owing to the former period of union between most of Moldova and Romania, many Moldovans are eligible for Romanian citizenship on the basis of Romanian descent. Many immigrants from the Republic of Moldova prefer to settle in the Romanian counties from the region of Western Moldavia as the culture there is more similar to that of their home country. There are also significant Moldovan communities in the largest cities of Romania, such as Bucharest and Constanța (Wallachia) as well as Cluj-Napoca (Transylvania) and Timișoara (Banat).

== See also ==
- Moldova–Romania relations
- Moldovan diaspora
- Ethnic groups in Romania
