= 2015 Gagauz gubernatorial election =

- 22 March 2015

Gubernatorial elections were held in Gagauzia on 22 March 2015. Irina Vlah was elected Governor (Başkan) with 51% of the vote. She subsequently resigned from parliament upon becoming Governor in April.

== Campaign ==
In 2014, before running for governor, Irina Vlah left the Communist faction in Parliament, protesting that the party's national leadership was betraying pro-Russian voters. She was also one of the initiators of a movement that led to the 2014 referendum for Gagauzia to join the Russian-led Eurasian Economic Union. During the 2015 campaign Russian celebrities and deputies of the Russian State Duma publicly backed Vlah; in response the Moldovan government accused Russia of meddling in the election and threatened to ban those involved from entering the country. Ukraine reinforced its western border adjacent to Gagauzia upon the victory of Vlah, a pro-Russian candidate, only a year after the annexation of Crimea and amidst the ongoing war against Russian-backed forces in its eastern provinces.

Vlah herself claimed that she faced opposition due to her status as the only female gubernatorial candidate, and that her electoral triumph represented a victory against "patriarchal stereotypes".

All candidates ran as independents. However, Vlah ran with the support of the Party of Socialists. Valerii Ianioglo was supported by United Gagauzia, whilst Nicolai Dudoglo was backed by the Democratic Party, the Equality Movement and New Gagauzia.

Two candidates, Serghei Buzadji and Oleg Caici, withdrew from the elections. Buzadji subsequently gave his support to Vlah, whilst Caici supported Dudoglo.

== Results ==
Candidate	Votes	%
Irina Vlah	32,543	51.11
Nicolai Dudoglo	12,136	19.06
Valerii Ianioglo	5,080	7.98
Dmitrii Croitor	3,956	6.21
Oleg Garizan	3,251	5.11
Alexandr Stoianoglo	3,174	4.98
Ruslan Garbalî	3,075	4.83
Leonid Dobrov	253	0.40
Serghei Cernev	122	0.19
Ilia Anastasov	84	0.13
Total	63,674	100.00
Valid votes	63,674	99.44
Invalid/blank votes	359	0.56
Total votes	64,033	100.00
Registered voters/turnout	109,998	58.21
Source: eDemocracy
