= Signature forgery =

False signature

Signature forgery refers to the act of falsely replicating another person's signature.

== Methods ==
Several different methods can be used to forge signatures. One method is the "freehand method", whereby the forger, after careful practice, replicates the signature by freehand. Although a difficult method to perfect, this often produces the most convincing results.

In the "trace-over method", the sheet of paper containing the genuine signature is placed on top of the paper where the forgery is required. The signature is traced over, appearing as a faint indentation on the sheet of paper underneath. This indentation can then be used as a guide for a signature.

== Detection ==
A number of characteristics can suggest to an examiner that a signature has been forged, mostly stemming from the forger focusing on accuracy rather than fluency. These include:

- Shaky handwriting
- Pen lifts
- Signs of retouching
- Letter proportions
- Very close similarity between two or more signatures
