= Constantinovca =

- Commune
- Location within Edineț
- Coordinates: 48°14′56″N 27°6′34″E
- Country: Moldova

Area
  - Total: 2,270 km^{2} (880 sq mi)
- Elevation: 195 m (640 ft)

Population (2014)
  - Total: 537
- Time zone: UTC+2 (EET)
  - Summer (DST): UTC+3 (EEST)
- Postal code: MD-4623

Constantinovca is a commune in Edineţ district, Moldova. It is composed of two villages: Constantinovca and Iachimeni.
