= Central Electoral Commission of Moldova =

Moldovan government body

Central Electoral Commission
- Comisia Electorală Centrală (CEC)
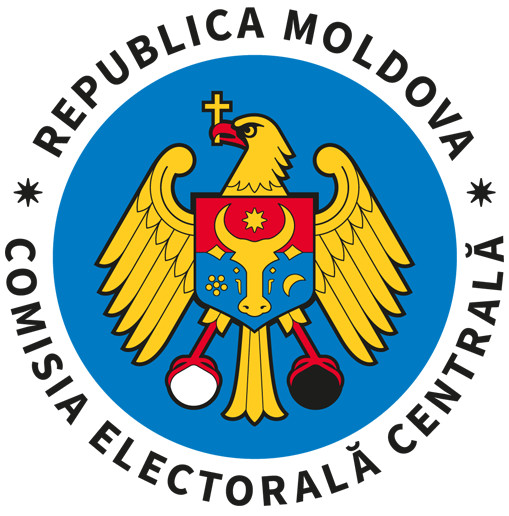

Agency overview
- Formed: 24 November 1989
- Jurisdiction: Parliament of Moldova
- Headquarters: 119 Vasile Alecsandri Street, Chișinău, Moldova
- Agency executives: Angelica Caraman, President; Pavel Postica, Vice President; Dana Munteanu, Secretary
- Website: a.cec.md

The Central Electoral Commission of the Republic of Moldova (Romanian: Comisia Electorală Centrală a Republicii Moldova, commonly abbreviated as CEC) is a permanent collegiate body of the Moldovan government. The president of the CEC is Angelica Caraman.
