= 2019 Moldovan constitutional crisis =

- Part of aftermath of the 2019 Moldovan parliamentary election
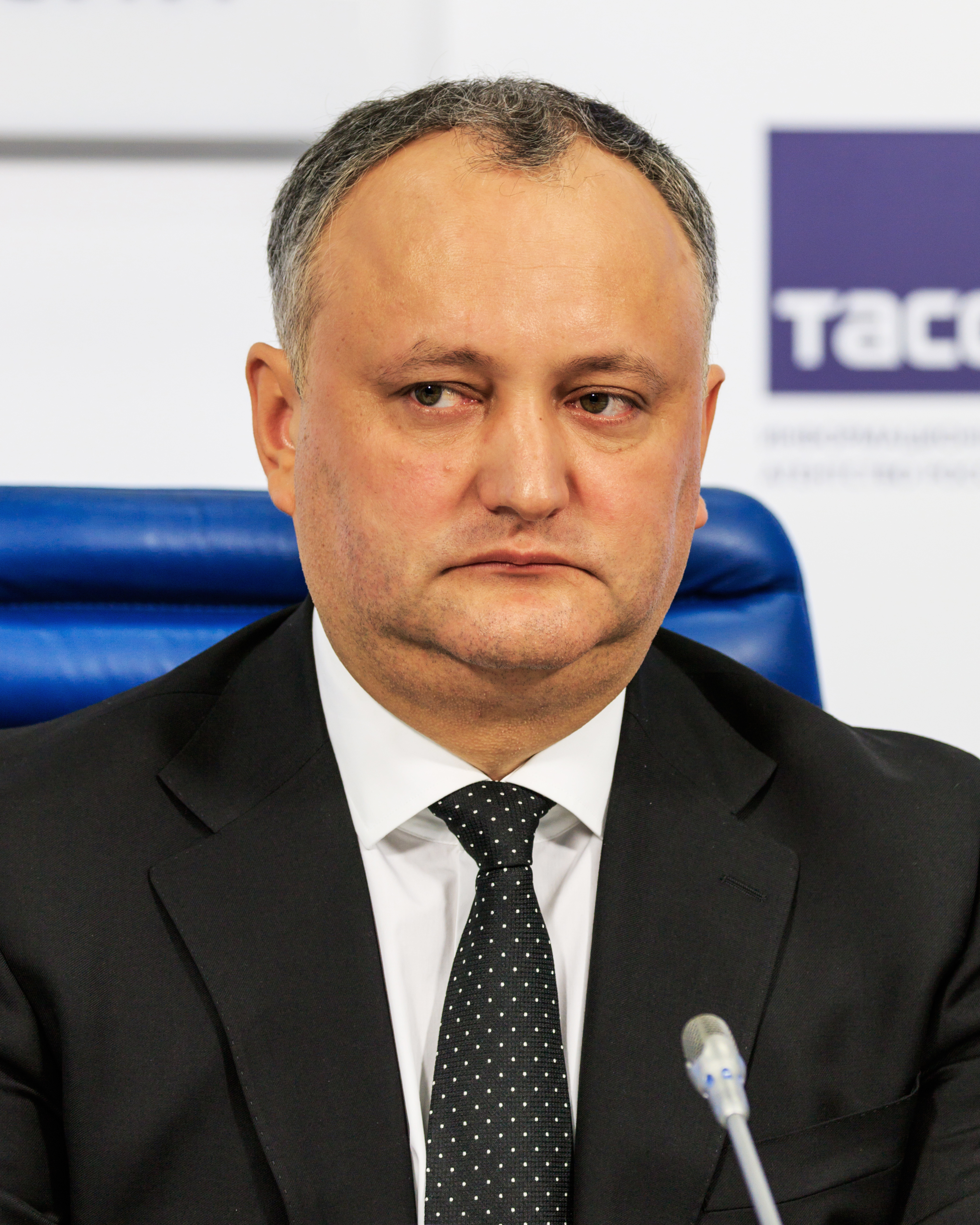
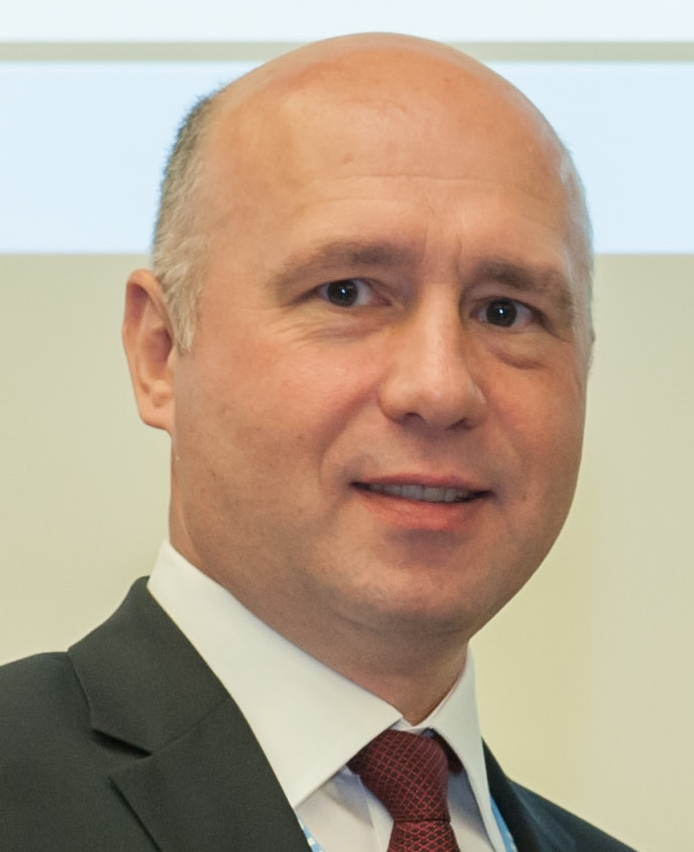
- Igor Dodon (left), Pavel Filip (right)
- Date: 7 June 2019 – 15 June 2019
- Location: Moldova
- Result: Resignation of Pavel Filip Cabinet; Vladimir Plahotniuc flees the country; Reversal of Constitutional court edicts; Maia Sandu Cabinet establishes itself as sole executive authority in Moldova

Parties
President of Moldova; Sandu Cabinet; Party of Socialists of the Republic of Moldova; ACUM (PPDA and PAS); Diplomatic support: European Union; Russia	Acting president; Filip Cabinet; Constitutional Court; Democratic Party of Moldova; Diplomatic support: Romania (until 12 June)

Lead figures
Igor Dodon; Maia Sandu; Zinaida Greceanîi	Pavel Filip; Vladimir Plahotniuc; Andrian Candu

In mid-2019, a sequence of events following the 2019 Moldovan parliamentary election – and the subsequent attempts to form and install a new government, culminated in the positions of prime minister and Speaker of the Parliament, as well as the powers and duties of the president, being claimed by competing individuals.

On 8 June 2019, Maia Sandu was elected prime minister by parliament – forming the Sandu Cabinet, while Zinaida Greceanîi was elected Speaker of the Parliament. However, on 9 June 2019 the Constitutional Court temporarily suspended the President of Moldova – Igor Dodon, from the powers and duties of his office and one of the claimants to the position of prime minister, Pavel Filip, was appointed acting president. Filip immediately issued a decree dissolving the parliament, whereas the new government said this move was illegal.

== Background ==
Moldova is a parliamentary republic. In December 2016, Igor Dodon, former leader of the Party of Socialists of the Republic of Moldova, was elected president. He is described as pro-Russian and was backed by Russia. In February 2019, as the result of the 2019 parliamentary elections, the Socialist party won 35 seats in the parliament, followed by the Democratic Party of Moldova chaired by Vladimir Plahotniuc (30 seats), the NOW Platform DA and PAS block by Sandu and Andrei Năstase (26 seats), the Șor Party (7 seats), and independent candidates (3 seats). By constitution, the parliament has "three months" (article 85) to form the government; if it fails to form the government, the president can dissolve the parliament and call new elections. The Constitutional Court interpreted the term as corresponding to 90 days, which is two days less than the sum of March, April and May. Until the new government had been formed, the outgoing Filip Cabinet, formed by the previous Democratic Party-dominated legislature, was to maintain control of the executive. The post-election configuration of the Moldovan parliament gave no outright majority to either party, thus making a coalition of two of the three biggest parties a necessity to gain a majority and elect a prime minister.

== Crisis ==
On Friday June 7, the Constitutional Court decided that new parliamentary elections are to be held if no government was made before a three-month (90 consecutive days) deadline starting from its validation of the election results on 9 March. This triggered a formation of a coalition. On Saturday June 8, the NOW Platform DA and PAS finally reached an agreement with the Socialist party. This agreement allowed Sandu to form the government, and the leader of the parliamentary fractions of the socialists, Zinaida Greceanîi, would become the speaker. This would be one day later than the 90 days deadline but before the three-month deadline expires. As a result, Dodon refused to intervene to dissolve the parliament. The Democratic party was left out, and the Democratic deputy, Sergiu Sîrbu, filed a request to the Constitutional Court to dismiss Dodon for his inability to dissolve the government. The court, which is considered to be under influence by the Democratic Party, on Sunday 9 June agreed to the request, dismissing Dodon and appointing Filip acting president. Filip dissolved the parliament and announced that early elections would be held on 6 September.

The coalition called the decision of Filip illegal. On June 8, supporters of the Democratic Party started to install tents in Chișinău. On June 14, Filip decided to step down from the government for 'political stability', but demanded a snap election and refused to recognize Sandu's government as legal. The move didn't address the presidential status of Dodon.

On June 15, the Constitutional Court repealed the decisions, judgements and opinions which had triggered the crisis. It was also reported that the leader of the Democratic Party Vladimir Plahotniuc fled the country on a private jet the day before. He claimed that he had left "for a few days" in order to visit his family.

On June 20, the president of the Constitutional Court, Mihai Poalelungi, resigned from office. Later, on June 26, the entire group of constitutional court judges announced their resignations as well. This move was welcomed by the now undisputed president and prime minister (Dodon and Sandu), who stated that through mass resignations and electing new independent judges will the integrity of the Constitutional Court be restored.

== Reactions ==
=== European Union ===
On June 8, the High Representative of the Union for Foreign Affairs and Security Policy Federica Mogherini issued a statement taking note of the decisions taken by the Moldovan parliament, "including on the formation of the government coalition". In the statement, the European Union expressed its willingness to work with the "democratically elected government", carefully not naming which one it was talking about, while recognizing the existence of the coalition government. The statement further indicated that the EU supported a "commitment to reforms" described by the EU-Moldova Association Agreement and that respect for the rule of law was paramount to EU-Moldova relations. Finally, the EU strongly "reiterated its call" for "calm and restraint", with the EU favoring "dialogue between democratically elected representatives" as a way forward.

The governments of France, Germany, Poland, Sweden, and the United Kingdom jointly declared their support for the new Sandu government and called for restraint. Romania, despite declaring on June 10 through its Minister of Foreign Affairs that it would not recognise the newly elected cabinet and would back early elections instead, finally recognised the Sandu cabinet on June 12.

=== Russia ===
On June 9, Russian deputy prime minister Dmitry Kozak described the actions of the Democratic Party as "frankly criminal". Kozak noted the "courageous and pragmatic position of the pro-European bloc Acum and the Party of Socialists of the Republic of Moldova" for overcoming political differences and representing the "will of the people". On June 12, Russian president Vladimir Putin backed pro-Russian president Dodon, additionally throwing his support behind "his current coalition partners" and calling the Democratic Party government "usupers". Putin stated that power had been seized by oligarchs, a situation which he likened to Ukraine.

=== United States ===
On June 10, the United States Department of State issued a statement "calling on all Moldovan parties to show restraint and to agree on a path forward through political dialogue" and emphasizing the validity of the 2019 Moldovan parliamentary election. The statement effectively fell short of endorsing either party to the crisis. On June 14, State Department Spokesperson Morgan Ortagus released a press statement "welcoming the democratic change in Moldova" and the Democratic Party's decision to resign from government in favor of the Sandu Cabinet. According to a news report which cited anonymous sources, the resignation of the Democratic Party came hours after the US Ambassador to Moldova Dereck J. Hogan met with a delegation from the Democratic Party.

=== Other countries and organizations ===
The Council of Europe declared on June 9 through its Secretary-General that the decisions of the Constitutional Court on the same day to invalidate the forming of the Sandu government were "difficult to understand" and seemed "to be arbitrary" vis-à-vis the Constitution and international rule of law standards. The Secretary-General also requested the Venice Commission, an independent advisory body of the council with competence in constitutional law, to urgently express an opinion on the dissolution of the Moldovan parliament by the Court. On the same day, NATO declared it was following "with concern" the developments in Moldova, and called on all parties to "exercise calm and restraint".

Israel and the Palestine Liberation Organization became indirectly involved with the crisis as the ousted prime minister Filip declared in a tweet that Moldova would move its embassy from Tel Aviv to Jerusalem. While Israel made no comment, the PLO "strongly condemned Moldova's unlawful decision". The Organisation of Islamic Cooperation also condemned the move without pronouncing itself on the legitimacy of the government. As noted by The Times of Israel, in general the Netanyahu government is making enormous efforts to convince countries to move their embassy in Israel from Tel Aviv to Jerusalem – but in this case, the Israeli government refrained from commenting, knowing that Filip might not be able to cling to power and that Sandu who may replace him (as indeed happened) was in no way committed to the Embassy move.
