= 2019 Moldovan parliamentary election =

- 24 February 2019
- All 101 seats in Parliament; 51 seats needed for a majority
- Turnout: 49.24% (▼6.55pp)
| Party | Leader | Vote % | Seats | +/– |
|---|---|---|---|---|
| PSRM | Zinaida Greceanîi | 31.15 | 35 | +10 |
| PDM | Vladimir Plahotniuc | 23.62 | 30 | +11 |
| ACUM | Maia Sandu & Andrei Năstase | 26.84 | 26 | New |
| ȘOR | Ilan Shor | 8.32 | 7 | New |
This lists parties that won seats. See the complete results below.
Most voted-for party territorial election commissions (left) and winning party by constituency (right)
| Prime Minister before | Prime Minister after |
|---|---|
| Pavel Filip; PDM | Maia Sandu; PAS (ACUM) |
| Cabinet before | Cabinet after |
|---|---|
| Filip Cabinet; PDM–EPPM | Sandu Cabinet; PAS–PSRM–DA |

Parliamentary elections were held in Moldova on 24 February 2019 in order to elect the 101 members of the Parliament of Moldova. The Constitution holds that elections are to be held no later than four years and three months from the date of inauguration of the previous legislature. The elections were held under a parallel voting system, replacing the closed-list proportional system used in Moldova at all previous parliamentary elections since the independence. The electoral campaign period began in November 2018 and continued up until the election day. Candidates from four parties were elected to the Parliament, more specifically the Party of Socialists of the Republic of Moldova (PSRM), the Democratic Party of Moldova (PDM), the ACUM electoral alliance composed of the DA and the PAS, and the Șor Party. The Party of Communists (PCRM) failed to obtain any seats for the first time since the independence of the Republic of Moldova. The results were subsequently confirmed and validated by Moldova's Constitutional Court on 9 March 2019. Furthermore, the results triggered a constitutional crisis in June.

== Electoral system ==
The 101 seats in the Parliament were elected using a parallel voting system introduced in 2017; 50 MPs were elected by proportional representation in a single nationwide constituency, with the other 51 elected from single-member constituencies.

For the nationwide constituency, the electoral threshold varies depending on the type of list; for single parties or organisations it was 6%; for alliances of two parties it was 9%, and for alliances of three or more parties it was 11%. For independent candidates the threshold was 2%. Turnout must be at least 33% to validate the results. There is still controversy against the new election system and a referendum in 2018 against it was considered possible.

== Parties and coalitions ==
Below is a list of the main parties and electoral blocs which contested the election:

| Party or coalition | | Lead candidate | Main ideology | Last election | | Government |
| Party or coalition | | Lead candidate | Main ideology | Vote % | Seats | Government |
|---|---|---|---|---|---|---|
| PSRM | | Zinaida Greceanîi | Democratic socialism Social conservatism | 20.5% | 25 | Opposition |
| PCRM | | Vladimir Voronin | Communism | 17.5% | 21 | Opposition |
| PDM | | Vladimir Plahotniuc | Social Democracy | 15.8% | 19 | Minority government |
| PL | | Dorin Chirtoacă | Conservative liberalism | 9.7% | 13 | Opposition |
| ACUM | PAS | Maia Sandu | Liberalism | Did not contest | | Opposition |
| ACUM | PPDA | Maia Sandu | Liberalism | Did not contest | | Opposition |
| ȘOR | | Ilan Shor | National conservatism Populism | Did not contest | | Opposition |

=== Competing electoral lists ===
| # (Note: Position number on the ballot.) | Name | | | Ideology | Leading candidate(s) |
|---|---|---|---|---|---|
| 1 | PDM | | Democratic Party of Moldova | Social democracy | Vladimir Plahotniuc |
| 2 | ACUM | DA | Dignity and Truth Platform | Liberalism | Andrei Năstase |
| 2 | ACUM | PAS | Party of Action and Solidarity | Liberalism | Maia Sandu |
| 2 | ACUM | PLDM | Liberal Democratic Party of Moldova | Liberal conservatism | Tudor Deliu |
| 3 | PCRM | | Party of Communists of the Republic of Moldova | Communism | Vladimir Voronin |
| 4 | PSRM | | Party of Socialists of the Republic of Moldova | Democratic socialism | Zinaida Greceanîi |
| 5 | ȘOR | | Șor Party | National conservatism | Ilan Șor |
| 6 | MPA | | Anti-Mafia Popular Movement | Populism | Sergiu Mocanu |
| 7 | PPPN | | Our Party | Social conservatism | Ilian Cașu |
| 8 | PNL | | National Liberal Party | National liberalism | Vitalia Pavlicenco |
| 9 | PPVP | | People's Will | Neoconservatism | Ștefan Urâtu |
| 10 | PRM | | Party of Regions of Moldova | Regionalism | Pavel Kalinin |
| 11 | PPDA | | Democracy at Home Party | Unionism | Ion Leașcenco |
| 12 | MPSN | | Movement of Professionals "Hope" | Populism | Andrei Donică |
| 13 | PPP | | Motherland | Conservatism | Sergiu Biriucov |
| 14 | PPPVE | | Ecologist Green Party | Green politics | Anatolie Prohnițchi |
| 15 | PL | | Liberal Party | Conservative liberalism | Dorin Chirtoacă |

== Opinion polls ==
View source data.

Poll results are listed in the table below in reverse chronological order, showing the most recent first, and using the date the survey's fieldwork was done, as opposed to the date of publication. If such date is unknown, the date of publication is given instead. The highest percentage figure in each polling survey is displayed in bold, and the background shaded in the leading party's colour. In the instance that there is a tie, then no figure is shaded. The "Lead" column on the right shows the percentage-point difference between the two parties with the highest figures. When a specific poll does not show a data figure for a party, the party's cell corresponding to that poll is shown empty. The threshold for a party to elect members is 6%.

| Date | Polling firm/source | PSRM | PLDM | PCRM | PDM | PL | PPPN | PPEM | ACUM | | Șor | PUN | Others | Lead | Decided |
| Date | Polling firm/source | PSRM | PLDM | PCRM | PDM | PL | PPPN | PPEM | DA | PAS | Șor | PUN | Others | Lead | Decided |
|---|---|---|---|---|---|---|---|---|---|---|---|---|---|---|---|
**2019**
| 3–16 February | IMAS | **33.8** | ACUM | 4.8 | 25.2 | 1.7 | 2.3 | | 21.8 | | 9.8 | (Note: Supporting the ACUM alliance) | 0.7 | 8.6 | 76.9 |
| 19–31 January | IMAS | **34.8** | ACUM | 6.8 | 22.5 | 1.7 | 1.6 | | 23.4 | | 8.2 | | 1.2 | 11.4 | 81.9 |
| 19–31 January | CBS-AXA | **42.8** | ACUM | 2.4 | 19.3 | 0.9 | 2.8 | | 25.1 | | 5.8 | | 1.0 | 17.7 | – |
| 17–26 January | iData | **41.0** | ACUM | 3.8 | 20.6 | <1.0 | 1.9 | | 25.6 | | 5.4 | | 1.4 | 20.4 | 78.0 |
| 4–19 January | ASDM | **49.2** | ACUM | 3.5 | 19.3 | <1.0 | 2.8 | | 19.1 | | 4.4 | | 1.7 | 29.9 | 82.4 |
| 5 December 2018 – 16 January 2019 | IRI | **43.3** | 2.2 | 3.3 | 15.5 | 1.1 | 2.2 | | 10.0 | 14.4 | 5.6 | | 2.2 | 27.8 | 89.0 |
**2018**
| 11–23 December 2018 | IMAS | **35.6** | 1.2 | 6.5 | 20.7 | 1.6 | 2.5 | 0.7 | 11.0 | 11.0 | 6.3 | 1.1 | 0.6 | 14.9 | 81.1 |
| 28 November–10 December 2018 | ASDM | **48.4** | | 3.0 | 17.9 | | 2.3 | | 9.4 | 12.8 | 4.2 | | 2.0 | 30.4 | 82.2 |
| 1-20 November 2018 | ASDM | **44.1** | | 2.6 | 15.5 | | 3.1 | | 13.5 | 14.5 | 3.9 | | 2.8 | 29.5 | - |
| 9-23 November 2018 | BOP | **45.5** | 1.0 | 3.4 | 15.0 | 1.6 | 2.4 | 0.2 | 9.9 | 14.6 | 5.9 | 0.2 | 0.4 | 30.5 | - |
| 20 October–9 November 2018 | IMAS | **36.0** | 1.7 | 7.7 | 20.9 | 2.0 | 3.7 | 1.6 | 9.4 | 8.5 | 6.6 | 0.7 | 1.1 | 15.1 | 75.2 |
| 11 September–16 October 2018 | IRI | **36.5** | <1.0 | 4.6 | 13.7 | 1.1 | 2.3 | <1.0 | 13.7 | 13.7 | 4.6 | | 1.1 | 22.8 | 87.6 |
| 1-12 September 2018 | ASDM | **47.3** | | 2.7 | 14.5 | | 2.1 | | 13.7 | 15.4 | 1.6 | | 2.7 | 31.9 | - |
| 26 June–7 July 2018 | ASDM | **49.7** | | 2.8 | 13.5 | | 2.5 | | 15.9 | 11.1 | 1.2 | | 3.3 | 33.8 | 74.9 |
| 15–28 March 2018 | ASDM | **50.5** | | 2.9 | 10.7 | 0.8 | 2.6 | 1.8 | 8.9 | 19.3 | 0.8 | 0.7 | 1.1 | 31.2 | 73.1 |
| 7 February–7 March 2018 | IRI | **43.9** | | 4.9 | 9.8 | 2.4 | 2.4 | 2.4 | 4.9 | 24.4 | | 1.2 | 2.4 | 21.5 | 83.0 |
| 16 February–6 March 2018 | IMAS | **38.9** | 0.8 | 7.9 | 16.2 | 2.0 | 3.4 | 3.2 | 7.3 | 16.4 | 3.2 | 0.5 | 0.2 | 22.5 | - |
| 2–18 January 2018 | ASD | **50.4** | | 2.3 | 10.6 | 1.0 | 2.0 | 1.6 | 5.4 | 24.1 | 1.1 | 0.7 | 0.7 | 26.3 | - |
**2017**
| 18 November–5 December 2017 | BOP | **47.6** | 1.1 | 4.5 | 5.1 | 2.7 | 4.4 | 1.4 | 6.2 | 22.5 | 2.9 | 0.7 | 0.5 | 25.1 | - |
| 20 November–2 December 2017 | ASDM | **51.2** | 1.0 | 2.3 | 6.9 | 1.2 | 2.0 | 1.9 | 4.8 | 25.9 | 0.7 | | 1.9 | 25.3 | 64.3 |
| 7–29 October 2017 | Ziarul Timpul FOP | **50.3** | 1.5 | 3.7 | 6.2 | 1.7 | 3.2 | 1.8 | 4.1 | 25.9 | 1.6 | | - | 24.4 | 88.4 |
| 23 September–17 October 2017 | IRI | **34.0** | <1.0 | 4.0 | 9.0 | 1.0 | 2.0 | 2.0 | 4.0 | 23.0 | 1.5 | | 0.5 | 11.0 | 81.0 |
| 9–20 September 2017 | CBS-Axa | **51.1** | | 4.5 | 6.0 | 1.2 | 3.9 | 1.3 | 5.8 | 24.1 | | | 2.1 | 27.0 | 50.8 |
| 22 June–9 July 2017 | IMAS | **42.3** | 1.0 | 6.4 | 11.7 | 2.2 | 5.2 | 2.2 | 7.5 | 19.2 | 1.3 | | 1.0 | 23.1 | 50.8 |
| 7–25 April 2017 | CBS-Axa | **52.7** | | 3.7 | 3.5 | 1.1 | 3.7 | 1.3 | 6.0 | 26.6 | 1.0 | | 0.4 | 26.1 | 60.3 |
| 23 March–17 April 2017 | BOP | **43.6** | 0.2 | 4.3 | 4.9 | 1.0 | 4.1 | 1.7 | 6.0 | 32.2 | 1.0 | | 1.0 | 11.4 | 75 |
| 10–19 March 2017 | Ziarul Timpul FOP | **54.2** | 0.6 | 2.6 | 4.3 | 0.6 | 2.5 | 1.4 | 5.6 | 28.2 | | | - | 26.0 | 89.3 |
| 13 February–7 March 2017 | IRI | **36.0** | <1.0 | 4.0 | 4.0 | <1.0 | 6.0 | 1.0 | 5.0 | 29.0 | | | 4.0 | 7.0 | 87 |
| 18–27 January 2017 | CBS-AXA | **51.2** | | 4.2 | 4.3 | 0.5 | 3.2 | 0.9 | 5.8 | 28.5 | | | 1.5 | 22.7 | 63.3 |
| 2–10 January 2017 | ASDM | **49.0** | 1.0 | 3.5 | 9.5 | 1.5 | 8.0 | 2.0 | 12.0 | 11.0 | | | 2.5 | 37.0 | 77 |
**2016**
| 13 November 2016 | **Igor Dodon** (PSRM) is elected President of Moldova | | | | | | | | | | | | | | |
| 6–16 October 2016 | IPP | **39.0** | 1.0 | 4.0 | 11.5 | 1.5 | 11.5 | 2.5 | 13.0 | 14.0 | | | 2.0 | 25.0 | 67 |
| 29 September–9 October 2016 | Intellect Grup | **32.0** | 1.0 | 6.5 | 16.5 | 2.0 | 9.0 | 3.5 | 13.0 | 15.5 | | | 1.0 | 15.5 | 79 |
| 28 September–5 October 2016 | ASDM | **34.4** | 1.9 | 6.5 | 11.4 | 4.0 | 9.3 | 5.6 | 14.3 | 12.6 | | | - | 20.1 | - |
| 21 September–8 October 2016 | CCSM | **32.2** | 1.5 | 3.2 | 15.8 | 2.8 | 7.9 | 5.1 | 11.6 | 19.8 | | | - | 12.4 | 78.3 |
| 19–28 September 2016 | Intellect Grup | **30.6** | 1.4 | 7.2 | 14.4 | 4.1 | 10.1 | 4.2 | 13.2 | 15.0 | | | - | 15.6 | 83.5 |
| 14–25 September 2016 | CBS-AXA | **35.6** | 0.7 | 7.3 | 13.5 | 3.2 | 13.3 | 3.9 | 12.7 | 9.9 | | | - | 12.1 | 82.2 |
| 1–23 September 2016 | IRI | **29.0** | | 5.0 | 12.0 | 1.0 | 8.0 | 3.0 | 13.0 | 14.0 | | | 1.0 | 15.0 | 86 |
| 2–10 September 2016 | ASDM | **27.7** | 2.7 | 8.7 | 11.9 | 5.5 | 11.5 | 7.9 | 10.3 | 13.8 | | | - | 13.8 | 92.6 |
| 11–24 June 2016 | Intellect Grup | **23.0** | 1.7 | 11.6 | 10.9 | 4.4 | 15.9 | 4.9 | 10.9 | 16.9 | | | - | 6.1 | 76.9 |
| 21 May–15 June 2016 | FOP | **28.7** | 1.5 | 8.6 | 8.0 | 3.3 | 13.6 | 7.2 | 12.4 | 16.7 | | | - | 12.0 | 91.5 |
| May 2016 | NDI | **21.0** | <1.0 | 12.0 | 8.0 | 5.0 | 13.0 | 5.0 | 18.0 | 16.0 | | | - | 3.0 | 76 |
| 16–23 April 2016 | IPP | **28.0** | 0.5 | 8.0 | 5.0 | 2.5 | 19.0 | 5.0 | 14.0 | 17.5 | | | 0.5 | 9.0 | 64 |
| 1–10 April 2016 | ASDM | **21.0** | 3.5 | 7.5 | 7.5 | 6.0 | 14.5 | 6.5 | 16.0 | 9.0 | | | 8.5 | 5.0 | 84 |
| 11–25 March 2016 | IRI | 20.0 | 2.0 | 6.0 | 7.0 | 2.0 | **21.0** | 4.0 | 12.0 | 12.0 | | | 2.0 | 1.0 | 88 |
| 11–20 March 2016 | FOP | **24.5** | 0.5 | 10.0 | 7.0 | 3.0 | 18.0 | 7.0 | 15.0 | 14.5 | | | 0.5 | 6.5 | 88 |
| 10–21 February 2016 | ASDM | **22.0** | 3.0 | 8.0 | 8.5 | 7.5 | 16.5 | 8.5 | 17.5 | | | | 8.5 | 5.5 | 78 |
| 5–13 February 2016 | CBS-AXA | 21.5 | 1.0 | 5.0 | 7.0 | 2.0 | **33.0** | 6.0 | 14.0 | 10.5 | | | - | 11.5 | 60 |
| 8–16 January 2016 | ASDM | **23.5** | 3.0 | 7.0 | 9.0 | 8.0 | 20.5 | 9.0 | 12.5 | | | | 7.5 | 3.0 | 72 |
**2015**
| 11–30 November 2015 | NDI | 21.0 | 3.0 | 12.5 | 5.5 | 7.0 | **22.5** | 10.0 | 17.0 | | | | 1.5 | 1.5 | 71 |
| 8 November–1 December 2015 | IPP | 15.0 | 2.0 | 11.0 | 9.0 | 7.0 | **24.0** | 18.0 | 10.0 | | | | 4.0 | 6.0 | 67 |
| 10–18 November 2015 | ASDM | **22.5** | 3.5 | 7.5 | 9.5 | 8.0 | 21.0 | 9.5 | 8.5 | | | | 10.0 | 1.5 | 72 |
| 29 September–21 October 2015 | IRI | 15.0 | 3.0 | 7.0 | 5.0 | 5.0 | **20.0** | 12.0 | 7.0 | | | | 2.0 | 7.0 | 76 |
| 10–18 September 2015 | CBS-AXA | 20.0 | 7.5 | 10.0 | 6.5 | 9.5 | **23.0** | 10.0 | 7.0 | | | | 6.5 | 3.0 | 56 |
| **14 June 2015** | **Local elections** | **16.6** | **18.3** | **10.2** | **17.6** | **12.6** | **11.1** | **7.6** | | | **0.3** | | **6.0** | **0.7** | **49** |
| 6–18 May 2015 | CBS-AXA | **28.6** | 8.7 | 15.5 | 6.8 | 11.7 | 14.8 | 14.0 | | | | | - | 13.1 | 60 |
| 1–12 April 2015 | ASDM | **25.5** | 14.0 | 15.5 | 11.5 | 15.0 | 8.5 | 7.5 | | | | | 2.5 | 10.0 | - |
| 1–26 March 2015 | NDI | 17.0 | 10.0 | 15.0 | 11.0 | 13.0 | **18.0** | 17.0 | 7.0 | | | | - | 1.0 | 72 |
| 22 February–4 March 2015 | CBS-AXA | **20.8** | 15.9 | 20.5 | 8.2 | **20.8** | 9.3 | 4.4 | | | | | - | 0.0 | 61 |
| January 2015 | CBS-AXA | **23.3** | 21.3 | 22.8 | 14.6 | 18.0 | | | | | | | - | 0.5 | 60 |
| **30 November 2014** | **Parliamentary elections** | **20.5** | **20.2** | **17.5** | **15.8** | **9.7** | | | | | | | **16.3** | **0.3** | **57** |

== Results ==
Party list results of the election, showing vote strength by commune.

| Party | Proportional | | | Constituency | | | Total seats | +/– |
| Party | Votes | % | Seats | Votes | % | Seats | Total seats | +/– |
|---|---|---|---|---|---|---|---|---|
| Party of Socialists | 441,191 | 31.15 | 18 | 405,469 | 29.38 | 17 | 35 | +10 |
| ACUM Electoral Bloc (DA and PAS) | 380,181 | 26.84 | 14 | 354,581 | 25.70 | 12 | 26 | New |
| Democratic Party | 334,539 | 23.62 | 13 | 344,387 | 24.96 | 17 | 30 | +11 |
| Șor Party | 117,779 | 8.32 | 5 | 119,598 | 8.67 | 2 | 7 | New |
| Party of Communists | 53,175 | 3.75 | 0 | 28,853 | 2.09 | 0 | 0 | –21 |
| Our Party | 41,769 | 2.95 | 0 | 38,838 | 2.81 | 0 | 0 | New |
| Liberal Party | 17,741 | 1.25 | 0 | 15,878 | 1.15 | 0 | 0 | –13 |
| Anti-Mafia Popular Movement Party | 8,633 | 0.61 | 0 | | | | 0 | 0 |
| Democracy at Home Party | 4,463 | 0.32 | 0 | 850 | 0.06 | 0 | 0 | 0 |
| Party of Regions of Moldova | 3,645 | 0.26 | 0 | | | | 0 | New |
| National Liberal Party | 3,430 | 0.24 | 0 | 811 | 0.06 | 0 | 0 | 0 |
| Ecologist Green Party | 3,249 | 0.23 | 0 | 655 | 0.05 | 0 | 0 | 0 |
| Movement of Professionals "Hope" | 2,826 | 0.20 | 0 | | | | 0 | New |
| People's Will Party | 2,705 | 0.19 | 0 | | | | 0 | New |
| Motherland Party | 1,033 | 0.07 | 0 | | | | 0 | New |
| Independents | | | | 70,010 | 5.07 | 3 | 3 | +3 |
| Total | 1,416,359 | 100.00 | 50 | 1,379,930 | 100.00 | 51 | 101 | 0 |
| Valid votes | 1,416,359 | 97.20 | | 1,379,930 | 95.74 | | | |
| Invalid/blank votes | 40,861 | 2.80 | | 61,396 | 4.26 | | | |
| Total votes | 1,457,220 | 100.00 | | 1,441,326 | 100.00 | | | |
| Registered voters/turnout | 2,959,143 | 49.24 | | 2,951,465 | 48.83 | | | |
Source: CEC

=== Results by constituency ===
Results by constituency

Nº1 Briceni
| Candidate | Party | Votes | % |
|---|---|---|---|
| Zinaida Greceanîi | Party of Socialists | 13,290 | 46.18 |
| Mihail Gnatiuc | Democratic Party | 10,424 | 36.22 |
| Vladimir Scutari | ACUM Electoral Bloc | 2,251 | 7.82 |
| Vasilii Petrașișin | Șor Party | 1,894 | 6.58 |
| Anatolie Creciun | Party of Communists | 922 | 3.20 |
| Total | | 28,781 | 100.00 |
| Valid votes | | 28,781 | 96.34 |
| Invalid/blank votes | | 1,092 | 3.66 |
| Total votes | | 29,873 | 100.00 |
| Registered voters/turnout | | 63,960 | 46.71 |

Nº2 Ocnița
| Candidate | Party | Votes | % |
|---|---|---|---|
| Irina Lozovan | Party of Socialists | 16,315 | 50.18 |
| Vadim Lesnic | Democratic Party | 8,417 | 25.89 |
| Eduard Fedișin | Șor Party | 2,586 | 7.95 |
| Remus Ciobanu | ACUM Electoral Bloc | 2,470 | 7.60 |
| Andrei Țopa | Party of Communists | 1,610 | 4.95 |
| Eduard Pleșca | Our Party | 1,113 | 3.42 |
| Total | | 32,511 | 100.00 |
| Valid votes | | 32,511 | 96.87 |
| Invalid/blank votes | | 1,050 | 3.13 |
| Total votes | | 33,561 | 100.00 |
| Registered voters/turnout | | 63,555 | 52.81 |

Nº3 Edineț
| Candidate | Party | Votes | % |
|---|---|---|---|
| Oleg Sîrbu | Democratic Party | 11,840 | 37.47 |
| Nicolai Melnic | Party of Socialists | 10,597 | 33.54 |
| Dinu Plîngău | ACUM Electoral Bloc | 3,243 | 10.26 |
| Ghenadie Panciuc | Șor Party | 3,194 | 10.11 |
| Alexandr Zui | Party of Communists | 1,189 | 3.76 |
| Elena Panuș | Our Party | 770 | 2.44 |
| Anatolie Vengher | Independent | 315 | 1.00 |
| Marin Livadaru | Independent | 309 | 0.98 |
| Alexandru Brenici | Independent | 138 | 0.44 |
| Total | | 31,595 | 100.00 |
| Valid votes | | 31,595 | 97.16 |
| Invalid/blank votes | | 924 | 2.84 |
| Total votes | | 32,519 | 100.00 |
| Registered voters/turnout | | 64,496 | 50.42 |

Nº4 Rîșcani
| Candidate | Party | Votes | % |
|---|---|---|---|
| Vladimir Mizdrenco | Party of Socialists | 11,774 | 42.96 |
| Iurie Urzică | Democratic Party | 11,604 | 42.34 |
| Andrei Cocieru | Șor Party | 2,497 | 9.11 |
| Petru Bărbieru | Party of Communists | 1,529 | 5.58 |
| Total | | 27,404 | 100.00 |
| Valid votes | | 27,404 | 89.32 |
| Invalid/blank votes | | 3,276 | 10.68 |
| Total votes | | 30,680 | 100.00 |
| Registered voters/turnout | | 62,810 | 48.85 |

Nº5 Glodeni
| Candidate | Party | Votes | % |
|---|---|---|---|
| Ion Leucă | Democratic Party | 9,811 | 34.55 |
| Alexandr Minizianov | Party of Socialists | 8,141 | 28.67 |
| Irina Dvorjanscaia | Șor Party | 3,248 | 11.44 |
| Stela Onuțu | Our Party | 3,071 | 10.81 |
| Rodica Nemerenco | ACUM Electoral Bloc | 2,575 | 9.07 |
| Ion Purice | Liberal Party | 612 | 2.16 |
| Nicolae Gorcea | Independent | 582 | 2.05 |
| Mihai Corj | Independent | 358 | 1.26 |
| Total | | 28,398 | 100.00 |
| Valid votes | | 28,398 | 95.76 |
| Invalid/blank votes | | 1,256 | 4.24 |
| Total votes | | 29,654 | 100.00 |
| Registered voters/turnout | | 63,285 | 46.86 |

Nº6 Drochia
| Candidate | Party | Votes | % |
|---|---|---|---|
| Corneliu Padnevici | Democratic Party | 10,396 | 33.19 |
| Alexandr Lupașco | Party of Socialists | 9,715 | 31.02 |
| Nina Cereteu | Our Party | 3,558 | 11.36 |
| Svetlana Conea | ACUM Electoral Bloc | 3,329 | 10.63 |
| Grigore Svecla | Șor Party | 2,514 | 8.03 |
| Ghenadie Morcov | Party of Communists | 1,467 | 4.68 |
| Violeta Roșca | Liberal Party | 342 | 1.09 |
| Total | | 31,321 | 100.00 |
| Valid votes | | 31,321 | 96.74 |
| Invalid/blank votes | | 1,057 | 3.26 |
| Total votes | | 32,378 | 100.00 |
| Registered voters/turnout | | 65,839 | 49.18 |

Nº7 Soroca
| Candidate | Party | Votes | % |
|---|---|---|---|
| Alla Pilipețcaia | Party of Socialists | 10,733 | 37.07 |
| Victor Său | Democratic Party | 7,835 | 27.06 |
| Larisa Ungurean | ACUM Electoral Bloc | 4,667 | 16.12 |
| Elena Bodnarenco | Party of Communists | 2,011 | 6.94 |
| Maxim Melnic | Șor Party | 1,797 | 6.21 |
| Alexandru Cimbriciuc | Independent | 1,276 | 4.41 |
| Anastasia Televca | Our Party | 638 | 2.20 |
| Total | | 28,957 | 100.00 |
| Valid votes | | 28,957 | 96.19 |
| Invalid/blank votes | | 1,147 | 3.81 |
| Total votes | | 30,104 | 100.00 |
| Registered voters/turnout | | 66,163 | 45.50 |

Nº8 Florești
| Candidate | Party | Votes | % |
|---|---|---|---|
| Eugeniu Nichiforciuc | Democratic Party | 12,446 | 42.83 |
| Sergiu Groza | Party of Socialists | 8,425 | 28.99 |
| Iuere Țap | ACUM Electoral Bloc | 3,881 | 13.36 |
| Ghenadie Ladaniuc | Șor Party | 1,792 | 6.17 |
| Grigore Cojacaru | Party of Communists | 1,498 | 5.15 |
| Ludmila Crîjanovschi | Our Party | 806 | 2.77 |
| Anatole Cărbune | Liberal Party | 212 | 0.73 |
| Total | | 29,060 | 100.00 |
| Valid votes | | 29,060 | 96.78 |
| Invalid/blank votes | | 966 | 3.22 |
| Total votes | | 30,026 | 100.00 |
| Registered voters/turnout | | 62,475 | 48.06 |

Nº9 Bălți
| Candidate | Party | Votes | % |
|---|---|---|---|
| Alexandr Usatîi | Party of Socialists | 9,158 | 33.43 |
| Ivan Osoianu | Our Party | 8,578 | 31.31 |
| Elena Bordianu | ACUM Electoral Bloc | 3,484 | 12.72 |
| Serghei Buzurnîi | Democratic Party | 3,339 | 12.19 |
| Igor Himici | Șor Party | 1,768 | 6.45 |
| Said-Muhmat Amaev | Party of Communists | 509 | 1.86 |
| Diana Grosu | Independent | 364 | 1.33 |
| Renata Grădinaru | Independent | 197 | 0.72 |
| Total | | 27,397 | 100.00 |
| Valid votes | | 27,397 | 95.19 |
| Invalid/blank votes | | 1,383 | 4.81 |
| Total votes | | 28,780 | 100.00 |
| Registered voters/turnout | | 64,807 | 44.41 |

Nº10 Bălți
| Candidate | Party | Votes | % |
|---|---|---|---|
| Alexandr Nesterovschi | Party of Socialists | 9,498 | 33.54 |
| Elena Grițco | Our Party | 7,852 | 27.73 |
| Arina Spătaru | ACUM Electoral Bloc | 3,966 | 14.00 |
| Serghei Iordan | Democratic Party | 3,718 | 13.13 |
| Pavel Verejanu | Șor Party | 2,535 | 8.95 |
| Serghei Rubțov | Party of Communists | 750 | 2.65 |
| Total | | 28,319 | 100.00 |
| Valid votes | | 28,319 | 96.27 |
| Invalid/blank votes | | 1,097 | 3.73 |
| Total votes | | 29,416 | 100.00 |
| Registered voters/turnout | | 64,736 | 45.44 |

Nº11 Fălești
| Candidate | Party | Votes | % |
|---|---|---|---|
| Oleg Savva | Party of Socialists | 10,388 | 33.35 |
| Iraida Bînzari | Democratic Party | 10,014 | 32.15 |
| Vasili Tataru | ACUM Electoral Bloc | 3,755 | 12.06 |
| Alexandr Severin | Our Party | 3,412 | 10.96 |
| Alexandru Botnar | Șor Party | 2,029 | 6.51 |
| Valeriu Muduc | Party of Communists | 1,547 | 4.97 |
| Total | | 31,145 | 100.00 |
| Valid votes | | 31,145 | 96.80 |
| Invalid/blank votes | | 1,028 | 3.20 |
| Total votes | | 32,173 | 100.00 |
| Registered voters/turnout | | 65,369 | 49.22 |

Nº12 Sîngerei
| Candidate | Party | Votes | % |
|---|---|---|---|
| Gheorghe Brașovschi | Democratic Party | 8,768 | 32.77 |
| Vasile Luca | Party of Socialists | 7,178 | 26.83 |
| Oazu Nantoi | ACUM Electoral Bloc | 5,736 | 21.44 |
| Igor Țîbîrnă | Șor Party | 3,151 | 11.78 |
| Viorel Neaga | Party of Communists | 1,212 | 4.53 |
| Ion Roșca | Independent | 712 | 2.66 |
| Total | | 26,757 | 100.00 |
| Valid votes | | 26,757 | 96.15 |
| Invalid/blank votes | | 1,070 | 3.85 |
| Total votes | | 27,827 | 100.00 |
| Registered voters/turnout | | 62,280 | 44.68 |

Nº13 Rezina
| Candidate | Party | Votes | % |
|---|---|---|---|
| Eleonora Graur | Democratic Party | 12,466 | 41.32 |
| Valeriu Ciorici | Party of Socialists | 6,470 | 21.44 |
| Serghei Cataranciuc | ACUM Electoral Bloc | 5,541 | 18.36 |
| Leonid Nauc | Șor Party | 4,261 | 14.12 |
| Elena Macrii | Party of Communists | 1,135 | 3.76 |
| Galina Andrieș | National Liberal Party | 300 | 0.99 |
| Total | | 30,173 | 100.00 |
| Valid votes | | 30,173 | 95.29 |
| Invalid/blank votes | | 1,490 | 4.71 |
| Total votes | | 31,663 | 100.00 |
| Registered voters/turnout | | 61,846 | 51.20 |

Nº14 Telenești
| Candidate | Party | Votes | % |
|---|---|---|---|
| Maria Ciobanu | ACUM Electoral Bloc | 9,724 | 33.17 |
| Vadim Lelic | Democratic Party | 9,215 | 31.43 |
| Valerian Cristea | Șor Party | 4,953 | 16.90 |
| Alexandru Isac | Party of Socialists | 3,747 | 12.78 |
| Mihail Moldovanu | Liberal Party | 847 | 2.89 |
| Veaceslav Căpățină | Party of Communists | 829 | 2.83 |
| Total | | 29,315 | 100.00 |
| Valid votes | | 29,315 | 96.09 |
| Invalid/blank votes | | 1,193 | 3.91 |
| Total votes | | 30,508 | 100.00 |
| Registered voters/turnout | | 65,482 | 46.59 |

Nº15 Călărași
| Candidate | Party | Votes | % |
|---|---|---|---|
| Nicolae Ciubuc | Democratic Party | 10,549 | 37.71 |
| Igor Munteanu | ACUM Electoral Bloc | 8,317 | 29.73 |
| Ștefan Bolea | Party of Socialists | 5,275 | 18.86 |
| Olga Vlasenco | Șor Party | 2,347 | 8.39 |
| Valeriu Sava | Party of Communists | 1,033 | 3.69 |
| Iurie Chirinciuc | Liberal Party | 452 | 1.62 |
| Total | | 27,973 | 100.00 |
| Valid votes | | 27,973 | 95.99 |
| Invalid/blank votes | | 1,170 | 4.01 |
| Total votes | | 29,143 | 100.00 |
| Registered voters/turnout | | 65,225 | 44.68 |

Nº16 Ungheni
| Candidate | Party | Votes | % |
|---|---|---|---|
| Ludmila Guzun | Democratic Party | 10,048 | 32.56 |
| Ghenadi Mitriuc | Party of Socialists | 8,750 | 28.35 |
| Octavian Țîcu | ACUM Electoral Bloc | 8,736 | 28.30 |
| Antonina Baraniuc | Șor Party | 1,995 | 6.46 |
| Haralampie Chirilov | Party of Communists | 1,335 | 4.33 |
| Total | | 30,864 | 100.00 |
| Valid votes | | 30,864 | 96.57 |
| Invalid/blank votes | | 1,095 | 3.43 |
| Total votes | | 31,959 | 100.00 |
| Registered voters/turnout | | 66,155 | 48.31 |

Nº17 Nisporeni
| Candidate | Party | Votes | % |
|---|---|---|---|
| Vladimir Plahotniuc | Democratic Party | 20,926 | 72.36 |
| Ion Terguță | ACUM Electoral Bloc | 5,311 | 18.36 |
| Pavel Artamonov | Party of Socialists | 1,877 | 6.49 |
| Mihail Ciorici | Party of Communists | 547 | 1.89 |
| Iurii Cărbune | Independent | 260 | 0.90 |
| Total | | 28,921 | 100.00 |
| Valid votes | | 28,921 | 97.18 |
| Invalid/blank votes | | 839 | 2.82 |
| Total votes | | 29,760 | 100.00 |
| Registered voters/turnout | | 62,780 | 47.40 |

Nº18 Orhei
| Candidate | Party | Votes | % |
|---|---|---|---|
| Ilan Șor | Șor Party | 17,968 | 59.22 |
| Valeriu Munteanu | ACUM Electoral Bloc | 6,104 | 20.12 |
| Vasile Costin | Democratic Party | 3,404 | 11.22 |
| Mihail Catraniuc | Party of Socialists | 1,780 | 5.87 |
| Dorin Zghibarța | Liberal Party | 546 | 1.80 |
| Svetlana Căpățînă | Party of Communists | 538 | 1.77 |
| Total | | 30,340 | 100.00 |
| Valid votes | | 30,340 | 96.26 |
| Invalid/blank votes | | 1,180 | 3.74 |
| Total votes | | 31,520 | 100.00 |
| Registered voters/turnout | | 64,698 | 48.72 |

Nº19 Ivancea
| Candidate | Party | Votes | % |
|---|---|---|---|
| Marina Tauber | Șor Party | 12,226 | 42.09 |
| Tudor Golub | Democratic Party | 6,393 | 22.01 |
| Mariana Cușnir | ACUM Electoral Bloc | 5,389 | 18.55 |
| Mihail Paciu | Party of Socialists | 3,089 | 10.63 |
| Lucia Viscun | Party of Communists | 1,007 | 3.47 |
| Vitalie Marinuța | Ecologist Green Party | 492 | 1.69 |
| Roman Boțan | Liberal Party | 451 | 1.55 |
| Total | | 29,047 | 100.00 |
| Valid votes | | 29,047 | 95.64 |
| Invalid/blank votes | | 1,323 | 4.36 |
| Total votes | | 30,370 | 100.00 |
| Registered voters/turnout | | 63,044 | 48.17 |

Nº20 Strășeni
| Candidate | Party | Votes | % |
|---|---|---|---|
| Pavel Filip | Democratic Party | 13,047 | 45.56 |
| Igor Grosu | ACUM Electoral Bloc | 8,524 | 29.76 |
| Veaceslav Anghel | Party of Socialists | 3,408 | 11.90 |
| Valeriu Tabacaru | Șor Party | 3,065 | 10.70 |
| Nicoleta Malai | Liberal Party | 595 | 2.08 |
| Total | | 28,639 | 100.00 |
| Valid votes | | 28,639 | 95.88 |
| Invalid/blank votes | | 1,231 | 4.12 |
| Total votes | | 29,870 | 100.00 |
| Registered voters/turnout | | 61,566 | 48.52 |

Nº21 Criuleni
| Candidate | Party | Votes | % |
|---|---|---|---|
| Lilian Carp | ACUM Electoral Bloc | 9,775 | 32.07 |
| Veaceslav Burlac | Democratic Party | 9,387 | 30.80 |
| Sergiu Berzan | Party of Socialists | 7,351 | 24.12 |
| Serghei Duminica | Șor Party | 1,931 | 6.34 |
| Gheorghe Ojog | Liberal Party | 1,618 | 5.31 |
| Andrei Porubin | Independent | 417 | 1.37 |
| Total | | 30,479 | 100.00 |
| Valid votes | | 30,479 | 95.07 |
| Invalid/blank votes | | 1,582 | 4.93 |
| Total votes | | 32,061 | 100.00 |
| Registered voters/turnout | | 64,506 | 49.70 |

Nº22 Ialoveni
| Candidate | Party | Votes | % |
|---|---|---|---|
| Liviu Vovc | ACUM Electoral Bloc | 11,847 | 42.71 |
| Monica Babuc | Democratic Party | 9,671 | 34.86 |
| Lidia Onu | Party of Socialists | 4,186 | 15.09 |
| Victor Sănduță | Șor Party | 1,273 | 4.59 |
| Angela Istrate | Independent | 762 | 2.75 |
| Total | | 27,739 | 100.00 |
| Valid votes | | 27,739 | 94.86 |
| Invalid/blank votes | | 1,504 | 5.14 |
| Total votes | | 29,243 | 100.00 |
| Registered voters/turnout | | 63,970 | 45.71 |

Nº23 Chișinău
| Candidate | Party | Votes | % |
|---|---|---|---|
| Oleg Lipskii | Party of Socialists | 10,277 | 40.12 |
| Vasile Grădinaru | ACUM Electoral Bloc | 9,146 | 35.71 |
| Petru Jardan | Șor Party | 2,981 | 11.64 |
| Valentina Rotaru | Democratic Party | 2,526 | 9.86 |
| Sergiu Biriucov | Independent | 684 | 2.67 |
| Total | | 25,614 | 100.00 |
| Valid votes | | 25,614 | 94.87 |
| Invalid/blank votes | | 1,386 | 5.13 |
| Total votes | | 27,000 | 100.00 |
| Registered voters/turnout | | 56,761 | 47.57 |

Nº24 Chișinău
| Candidate | Party | Votes | % |
|---|---|---|---|
| Vasile Bolea | Party of Socialists | 12,827 | 48.80 |
| Grigore Colun | ACUM Electoral Bloc | 8,322 | 31.66 |
| Alexandr Bannicov | Democratic Party | 2,518 | 9.58 |
| Serghei Burgudji | Șor Party | 2,103 | 8.00 |
| Artur Croitor | Independent | 514 | 1.96 |
| Total | | 26,284 | 100.00 |
| Valid votes | | 26,284 | 94.72 |
| Invalid/blank votes | | 1,465 | 5.28 |
| Total votes | | 27,749 | 100.00 |
| Registered voters/turnout | | 57,245 | 48.47 |

Nº25 Chișinău
| Candidate | Party | Votes | % |
|---|---|---|---|
| Inga Grigoriu | ACUM Electoral Bloc | 11,635 | 42.70 |
| Alexandr Odințov | Party of Socialists | 10,930 | 40.11 |
| Victor Mîndru | Democratic Party | 3,198 | 11.74 |
| Dumitru Chitoraga | Șor Party | 1,485 | 5.45 |
| Total | | 27,248 | 100.00 |
| Valid votes | | 27,248 | 94.76 |
| Invalid/blank votes | | 1,506 | 5.24 |
| Total votes | | 28,754 | 100.00 |
| Registered voters/turnout | | 57,693 | 49.84 |

Nº26 Chișinău
| Candidate | Party | Votes | % |
|---|---|---|---|
| Iurie Reniță | ACUM Electoral Bloc | 10,082 | 37.30 |
| Dinari Cojocaru | Party of Socialists | 9,944 | 36.78 |
| Mihai Stratulat | Democratic Party | 3,050 | 11.28 |
| Victor Cotelea | Șor Party | 1,508 | 5.58 |
| Vlad Bilețchi | Liberal Party | 1,261 | 4.66 |
| Anton Miron | Party of Communists | 670 | 2.48 |
| Valeriu Cerba | Independent | 518 | 1.92 |
| Total | | 27,033 | 100.00 |
| Valid votes | | 27,033 | 95.09 |
| Invalid/blank votes | | 1,395 | 4.91 |
| Total votes | | 28,428 | 100.00 |
| Registered voters/turnout | | 57,978 | 49.03 |

Nº27 Chișinău
| Candidate | Party | Votes | % |
|---|---|---|---|
| Vladimir Bolea | ACUM Electoral Bloc | 11,058 | 41.54 |
| Radu Mudreac | Party of Socialists | 8,896 | 33.42 |
| Veaceslav Nedelea | Democratic Party | 3,304 | 12.41 |
| Cristian Botnarenco | Șor Party | 1,726 | 6.48 |
| Ilian Cașu | Our Party | 962 | 3.61 |
| Augustin Volconovici | Party of Communists | 673 | 2.53 |
| Total | | 26,619 | 100.00 |
| Valid votes | | 26,619 | 95.00 |
| Invalid/blank votes | | 1,400 | 5.00 |
| Total votes | | 28,019 | 100.00 |
| Registered voters/turnout | | 58,660 | 47.77 |

Nº28 Chișinău
| Candidate | Party | Votes | % |
|---|---|---|---|
| Vlad Batrîncea | Party of Socialists | 10,648 | 38.34 |
| Alexandru Slusari | ACUM Electoral Bloc | 9,752 | 35.12 |
| Nicolae Balaur | Democratic Party | 2,668 | 9.61 |
| Reghina Apostolova | Șor Party | 2,482 | 8.94 |
| Dumitru Ciubașenco | Our Party | 1,036 | 3.73 |
| Ion Cebanu | Liberal Party | 602 | 2.17 |
| Dumitru Cebotarescu | Independent | 583 | 2.10 |
| Total | | 27,771 | 100.00 |
| Valid votes | | 27,771 | 96.49 |
| Invalid/blank votes | | 1,011 | 3.51 |
| Total votes | | 28,782 | 100.00 |
| Registered voters/turnout | | 55,952 | 51.44 |

Nº29 Chișinău
| Candidate | Party | Votes | % |
|---|---|---|---|
| Adrian Lebedinschi | Party of Socialists | 11,089 | 43.50 |
| Ruslan Verbițchi | ACUM Electoral Bloc | 9,366 | 36.74 |
| Valentin Guznac | Democratic Party | 2,817 | 11.05 |
| Inna Popenco | Șor Party | 1,456 | 5.71 |
| Dumitru Jelescu | Liberal Party | 764 | 3.00 |
| Total | | 25,492 | 100.00 |
| Valid votes | | 25,492 | 94.67 |
| Invalid/blank votes | | 1,434 | 5.33 |
| Total votes | | 26,926 | 100.00 |
| Registered voters/turnout | | 55,910 | 48.16 |

Nº30 Chișinău
| Candidate | Party | Votes | % |
|---|---|---|---|
| Dan Perciun | ACUM Electoral Bloc | 11,576 | 40.76 |
| Petru Burduja | Party of Socialists | 9,488 | 33.41 |
| Nae-Simion Pleșca | Democratic Party | 3,355 | 11.81 |
| Stanislav Cvasnîi | Șor Party | 1,969 | 6.93 |
| Veronica Herța | Liberal Party | 881 | 3.10 |
| Valentin Dolganiuc | Independent | 445 | 1.57 |
| Galina Bostan | Independent | 432 | 1.52 |
| Maxim Uvarov | Independent | 132 | 0.46 |
| Oleg Golopeatov | Independent | 122 | 0.43 |
| Total | | 28,400 | 100.00 |
| Valid votes | | 28,400 | 95.20 |
| Invalid/blank votes | | 1,433 | 4.80 |
| Total votes | | 29,833 | 100.00 |
| Registered voters/turnout | | 61,206 | 48.74 |

Nº31 Chișinău
| Candidate | Party | Votes | % |
|---|---|---|---|
| Grigore Novac | Party of Socialists | 10,607 | 38.63 |
| Liliana Nicolaescu-Onofrei | ACUM Electoral Bloc | 9,539 | 34.74 |
| Chiril Gaburici | Democratic Party | 3,618 | 13.18 |
| Iurii Cuznețov | Șor Party | 1,960 | 7.14 |
| Ilie Crețu | Liberal Party | 717 | 2.61 |
| Igor Grițco | Party of Communists | 581 | 2.12 |
| Mihai Cîrlig | Independent | 433 | 1.58 |
| Total | | 27,455 | 100.00 |
| Valid votes | | 27,455 | 95.45 |
| Invalid/blank votes | | 1,310 | 4.55 |
| Total votes | | 28,765 | 100.00 |
| Registered voters/turnout | | 60,532 | 47.52 |

Nº32 Chișinău
| Candidate | Party | Votes | % |
|---|---|---|---|
| Mihai Popșoi | ACUM Electoral Bloc | 9,865 | 37.03 |
| Svetlana Popa | Party of Socialists | 6,582 | 24.71 |
| Nina Costiuc | Democratic Party | 5,201 | 19.52 |
| Dorin Chirtoacă | Liberal Party | 3,035 | 11.39 |
| Sergiu Cebotari | Șor Party | 1,117 | 4.19 |
| Gheorghii Mocan | Party of Communists | 840 | 3.15 |
| Total | | 26,640 | 100.00 |
| Valid votes | | 26,640 | 95.67 |
| Invalid/blank votes | | 1,206 | 4.33 |
| Total votes | | 27,846 | 100.00 |
| Registered voters/turnout | | 59,389 | 46.89 |

Nº33 Chișinău
| Candidate | Party | Votes | % |
|---|---|---|---|
| Andrei Năstase | ACUM Electoral Bloc | 14,015 | 46.32 |
| Constantin Țuțu | Democratic Party | 8,824 | 29.16 |
| Vladimir Roșca | Party of Socialists | 4,987 | 16.48 |
| Ion Bivol | Șor Party | 838 | 2.77 |
| Boris Volosatîi | Independent | 603 | 1.99 |
| Călin Vieru | Independent | 531 | 1.75 |
| Andrei Nastas | Independent | 459 | 1.52 |
| Total | | 30,257 | 100.00 |
| Valid votes | | 30,257 | 95.95 |
| Invalid/blank votes | | 1,278 | 4.05 |
| Total votes | | 31,535 | 100.00 |
| Registered voters/turnout | | 63,930 | 49.33 |

Nº34 Anenii Noi
| Candidate | Party | Votes | % |
|---|---|---|---|
| Alexandru Jizdan | Democratic Party | 12,123 | 41.42 |
| Alexandr Mațarin | Party of Socialists | 7,982 | 27.27 |
| Gheorghe Balan | ACUM Electoral Bloc | 6,140 | 20.98 |
| Alexei Gorodinskii | Șor Party | 1,801 | 6.15 |
| Veaceslav Bondari | Party of Communists | 1,226 | 4.19 |
| Total | | 29,272 | 100.00 |
| Valid votes | | 29,272 | 96.43 |
| Invalid/blank votes | | 1,085 | 3.57 |
| Total votes | | 30,357 | 100.00 |
| Registered voters/turnout | | 65,462 | 46.37 |

Nº35 Căușeni
| Candidate | Party | Votes | % |
|---|---|---|---|
| Grigore Repeșciuc | Democratic Party | 10,054 | 37.95 |
| Anton Gamurar | ACUM Electoral Bloc | 5,916 | 22.33 |
| Oleg Cuciuc | Party of Socialists | 5,672 | 21.41 |
| Anatolie Zaremba | Șor Party | 1,920 | 7.25 |
| Veaceslav Nigai | Party of Communists | 1,848 | 6.98 |
| Zinaida Bolboceanu | Democracy at Home Party | 850 | 3.21 |
| Ion Calmîc | National Liberal Party | 231 | 0.87 |
| Total | | 26,491 | 100.00 |
| Valid votes | | 26,491 | 96.00 |
| Invalid/blank votes | | 1,105 | 4.00 |
| Total votes | | 27,596 | 100.00 |
| Registered voters/turnout | | 62,177 | 44.38 |

Nº36 Ștefan Vodă
| Candidate | Party | Votes | % |
|---|---|---|---|
| Alexandru Jolnaci | Party of Socialists | 9,014 | 33.92 |
| Nicolae Molozea | Democratic Party | 8,385 | 31.55 |
| Andrei Dînga | ACUM Electoral Bloc | 7,970 | 29.99 |
| Natalia Tcacenco | Șor Party | 1,207 | 4.54 |
| Total | | 26,576 | 100.00 |
| Valid votes | | 26,576 | 95.63 |
| Invalid/blank votes | | 1,213 | 4.37 |
| Total votes | | 27,789 | 100.00 |
| Registered voters/turnout | | 62,583 | 44.40 |

Nº37 Răzeni
| Candidate | Party | Votes | % |
|---|---|---|---|
| Petru Frunze | ACUM Electoral Bloc | 12,807 | 44.92 |
| Ion Sula | Democratic Party | 10,029 | 35.18 |
| Nicolae Pascaru | Party of Socialists | 3,608 | 12.66 |
| Ștefan Bivol | Party of Communists | 1,176 | 4.13 |
| Avelin Tabarcea | Șor Party | 888 | 3.11 |
| Total | | 28,508 | 100.00 |
| Valid votes | | 28,508 | 95.77 |
| Invalid/blank votes | | 1,259 | 4.23 |
| Total votes | | 29,767 | 100.00 |
| Registered voters/turnout | | 61,331 | 48.53 |

Nº38 Hîncești
| Candidate | Party | Votes | % |
|---|---|---|---|
| Alexandru Botnari | Democratic Party | 11,891 | 47.38 |
| Grigore Cobzac | ACUM Electoral Bloc | 8,392 | 33.44 |
| Petru Corduneanu | Party of Socialists | 3,673 | 14.64 |
| Victor Perțu | Șor Party | 1,139 | 4.54 |
| Total | | 25,095 | 100.00 |
| Valid votes | | 25,095 | 95.86 |
| Invalid/blank votes | | 1,084 | 4.14 |
| Total votes | | 26,179 | 100.00 |
| Registered voters/turnout | | 62,475 | 41.90 |

Nº39 Sărata-Galbenă
| Candidate | Party | Votes | % |
|---|---|---|---|
| Ghenadie Buza | Democratic Party | 9,550 | 42.96 |
| Chiril Moțpan | ACUM Electoral Bloc | 6,569 | 29.55 |
| Olesea Brînză | Party of Socialists | 4,131 | 18.58 |
| Victor Terente | Șor Party | 1,399 | 6.29 |
| Simion Roșca | Liberal Party | 579 | 2.60 |
| Total | | 22,228 | 100.00 |
| Valid votes | | 22,228 | 94.68 |
| Invalid/blank votes | | 1,249 | 5.32 |
| Total votes | | 23,477 | 100.00 |
| Registered voters/turnout | | 59,587 | 39.40 |

Nº40 Cimișlia
| Candidate | Party | Votes | % |
|---|---|---|---|
| Dumitru Diacov | Democratic Party | 6,634 | 28.51 |
| Piotr Pușcari | Party of Socialists | 6,462 | 27.77 |
| Domnica Manole | ACUM Electoral Bloc | 4,997 | 21.47 |
| Valentin Cimpoeș | Our Party | 2,150 | 9.24 |
| Victoria Cîrlan | Șor Party | 1,695 | 7.28 |
| Gheorghe Răileanu | Independent | 1,334 | 5.73 |
| Total | | 23,272 | 100.00 |
| Valid votes | | 23,272 | 95.92 |
| Invalid/blank votes | | 991 | 4.08 |
| Total votes | | 24,263 | 100.00 |
| Registered voters/turnout | | 60,437 | 40.15 |

Nº41 Leova
| Candidate | Party | Votes | % |
|---|---|---|---|
| Efrosinia Grețu | Democratic Party | 6,820 | 29.95 |
| Aliona Briciag | Party of Socialists | 5,293 | 23.24 |
| Vladimir Putregai | ACUM Electoral Bloc | 4,908 | 21.55 |
| Alexandru Bujorean | Independent | 2,048 | 8.99 |
| Andrei Trandafir | Șor Party | 2,034 | 8.93 |
| Sergiu Butuc | Our Party | 1,669 | 7.33 |
| Total | | 22,772 | 100.00 |
| Valid votes | | 22,772 | 95.03 |
| Invalid/blank votes | | 1,190 | 4.97 |
| Total votes | | 23,962 | 100.00 |
| Registered voters/turnout | | 60,304 | 39.74 |

Nº42 Cantemir
| Candidate | Party | Votes | % |
|---|---|---|---|
| Elena Bacalu | Democratic Party | 8,335 | 35.36 |
| Vladimir Țurcan | Party of Socialists | 8,270 | 35.09 |
| Constantin Boeștean | ACUM Electoral Bloc | 3,450 | 14.64 |
| Vasile Lupașcu | Șor Party | 1,565 | 6.64 |
| Roman Ciubaciuc | Our Party | 1,118 | 4.74 |
| Iurie Crăciuneac | Independent | 561 | 2.38 |
| Elena Damașcan | Liberal Party | 272 | 1.15 |
| Total | | 23,571 | 100.00 |
| Valid votes | | 23,571 | 96.03 |
| Invalid/blank votes | | 975 | 3.97 |
| Total votes | | 24,546 | 100.00 |
| Registered voters/turnout | | 60,028 | 40.89 |

Nº43 Cahul
| Candidate | Party | Votes | % |
|---|---|---|---|
| Ion Groza | Independent | 7,524 | 32.76 |
| Evgheni Osadcenco | Party of Socialists | 6,845 | 29.80 |
| Sergiu Tutuvan | ACUM Electoral Bloc | 5,125 | 22.31 |
| Antonia Belobrova | Șor Party | 1,398 | 6.09 |
| Gheorghe Ghetivu | Party of Communists | 895 | 3.90 |
| Sergiu Renta | Our Party | 721 | 3.14 |
| Ștefan Secăreanu | Liberal Party | 462 | 2.01 |
| Total | | 22,970 | 100.00 |
| Valid votes | | 22,970 | 91.43 |
| Invalid/blank votes | | 2,154 | 8.57 |
| Total votes | | 25,124 | 100.00 |
| Registered voters/turnout | | 61,805 | 40.65 |

Nº44 Taraclia
| Candidate | Party | Votes | % |
|---|---|---|---|
| Chiril Tatarlî | Party of Socialists | 9,693 | 57.46 |
| Veaceslav Cunev | Independent | 3,203 | 18.99 |
| Veaceslav Lupov | Șor Party | 1,782 | 10.56 |
| Fiodor Covalji | Democratic Party | 1,517 | 8.99 |
| Gheorghii Aricov | Independent | 674 | 4.00 |
| Total | | 16,869 | 100.00 |
| Valid votes | | 16,869 | 96.71 |
| Invalid/blank votes | | 573 | 3.29 |
| Total votes | | 17,442 | 100.00 |
| Registered voters/turnout | | 35,142 | 49.63 |

Nº45 Comrat
| Candidate | Party | Votes | % |
|---|---|---|---|
| Alexandr Suhodolski | Party of Socialists | 19,628 | 64.96 |
| Nicolai Dudoglo | Independent | 8,252 | 27.31 |
| Nina Dimoglo | Șor Party | 1,165 | 3.86 |
| Dmitrii Levintii | Our Party | 507 | 1.68 |
| Fiodor Mincu | Democratic Party | 286 | 0.95 |
| Ivan Cîlicic | Party of Communists | 276 | 0.91 |
| Tatiana Ursu | ACUM Electoral Bloc | 101 | 0.33 |
| Total | | 30,215 | 100.00 |
| Valid votes | | 30,215 | 96.98 |
| Invalid/blank votes | | 940 | 3.02 |
| Total votes | | 31,155 | 100.00 |
| Registered voters/turnout | | 64,562 | 48.26 |

Nº46 Ceadîr-Lunga
| Candidate | Party | Votes | % |
|---|---|---|---|
| Fiodor Gagauz | Party of Socialists | 22,018 | 75.82 |
| Grigorii Cadîn | Independent | 3,026 | 10.42 |
| Gheorghii Leiciu | Independent | 2,800 | 9.64 |
| Svetlana Ivanova | Șor Party | 786 | 2.71 |
| Vadim Delibaltov | Democratic Party | 408 | 1.41 |
| Total | | 29,038 | 100.00 |
| Valid votes | | 29,038 | 98.08 |
| Invalid/blank votes | | 568 | 1.92 |
| Total votes | | 29,606 | 100.00 |
| Registered voters/turnout | | 67,774 | 43.68 |

Nº47 Camenca, Rîbnița, Dubăsari and Grigoriopol
| Candidate | Party | Votes | % |
|---|---|---|---|
| Alexandru Oleinic | Independent | 10,463 | 62.54 |
| Grigore Filipov | Party of Socialists | 5,016 | 29.98 |
| Eleonora Cercavschi | ACUM Electoral Bloc | 384 | 2.30 |
| Asea Doga | Șor Party | 348 | 2.08 |
| Ivan Delibaltov | Democratic Party | 273 | 1.63 |
| Alexei Frunze | Independent | 132 | 0.79 |
| Ion Lapicus | Independent | 113 | 0.68 |
| Total | | 16,729 | 100.00 |
| Valid votes | | 16,729 | 96.50 |
| Invalid/blank votes | | 607 | 3.50 |
| Total votes | | 17,336 | 100.00 |
| Registered voters/turnout | | 17,338 | 99.99 |

Nº48 Slobozia, Tiraspol and Bender
| Candidate | Party | Votes | % |
|---|---|---|---|
| Viorel Melnic | Independent | 11,961 | 64.01 |
| Vitalii Evtodiev | Party of Socialists | 4,663 | 24.95 |
| Ion Iovcev | ACUM Electoral Bloc | 684 | 3.66 |
| Mihail Malașevschi | Democratic Party | 621 | 3.32 |
| Iurie Apostolachi | Independent | 501 | 2.68 |
| Inna Nazarenco | Șor Party | 150 | 0.80 |
| Petru Ursu | Independent | 107 | 0.57 |
| Total | | 18,687 | 100.00 |
| Valid votes | | 18,687 | 96.52 |
| Invalid/blank votes | | 673 | 3.48 |
| Total votes | | 19,360 | 100.00 |
| Registered voters/turnout | | 19,412 | 99.73 |

Nº49 East of Moldova
| Candidate | Party | Votes | % |
|---|---|---|---|
| Gheorghii Para | Party of Socialists | 3,614 | 49.16 |
| Dorin Frăsîneanu | ACUM Electoral Bloc | 1,996 | 27.15 |
| Nicolai Țipovici | Our Party | 877 | 11.93 |
| Ina Sîrbu | Democratic Party | 399 | 5.43 |
| Valerii Klimenko | Șor Party | 320 | 4.35 |
| Igor Ticuș | Independent | 82 | 1.12 |
| Dumitru Pogorea | Independent | 64 | 0.87 |
| Total | | 7,352 | 100.00 |
| Valid votes | | 7,352 | 94.90 |
| Invalid/blank votes | | 395 | 5.10 |
| Total votes | | 7,747 | 100.00 |
| Registered voters/turnout | | 7,758 | 99.86 |

Nº50 West of Moldova
| Candidate | Party | Votes | % |
|---|---|---|---|
| Maia Sandu | ACUM Electoral Bloc | 49,955 | 80.78 |
| Vadim Rotari | Party of Socialists | 2,383 | 3.85 |
| Olga Coptu | Democratic Party | 2,201 | 3.56 |
| Oleg Brega | Independent | 2,016 | 3.26 |
| Vasile Calmațui | Liberal Party | 1,630 | 2.64 |
| Tatiana Platon | Șor Party | 1,328 | 2.15 |
| Stela Stîngaci | Independent | 720 | 1.16 |
| Valentina Geamănă | Independent | 495 | 0.80 |
| Leonard Macari | Independent | 432 | 0.70 |
| Gheorghe Furdui | National Liberal Party | 280 | 0.45 |
| Gheorghe Bobeică | Independent | 187 | 0.30 |
| Natalia Iațco | Ecologist Green Party | 163 | 0.26 |
| Leonid Falcaș | Independent | 50 | 0.08 |
| Total | | 61,840 | 100.00 |
| Valid votes | | 61,840 | 96.20 |
| Invalid/blank votes | | 2,441 | 3.80 |
| Total votes | | 64,281 | 100.00 |
| Registered voters/turnout | | 64,364 | 99.87 |

Nº51 United States and Canada
| Candidate | Party | Votes | % |
|---|---|---|---|
| Dumitru Alaiba | ACUM Electoral Bloc | 2,206 | 49.05 |
| Valeriu Ghilețchi | Independent | 1,206 | 26.82 |
| Alexandrin Patron | Independent | 461 | 10.25 |
| Oleg Bînzar | Independent | 238 | 5.29 |
| Viorel Savva | Independent | 95 | 2.11 |
| Gaik Vartanean | Party of Socialists | 84 | 1.87 |
| Ghenadie Moroșanu | Democratic Party | 64 | 1.42 |
| Roman Palancica | Independent | 62 | 1.38 |
| Ana Vasilachi | Independent | 25 | 0.56 |
| Rodica Rusu | Șor Party | 24 | 0.53 |
| Gheorghi Grozav | Independent | 20 | 0.44 |
| Valentin Ganea | Independent | 7 | 0.16 |
| Petru Neaga | Independent | 5 | 0.11 |
| Total | | 4,497 | 100.00 |
| Valid votes | | 4,497 | 97.46 |
| Invalid/blank votes | | 117 | 2.54 |
| Total votes | | 4,614 | 100.00 |
| Registered voters/turnout | | 4,623 | 99.81 |

=== Results by administrative-territorial unit ===
| No. | Administrative-territorial unit | Turnout | PSRM | ACUM | PDM | ȘOR | PCRM | PN | PL |
|---|---|---|---|---|---|---|---|---|---|
| 1 | Chișinău | 49.71% | 34.79% | 37.73% | 13.37% | 5.62% | 2.69% | 1.60% | 2.14% |
| 2 | Bălți | 45.08% | 36.75% | 14.04% | 10.67% | 6.42% | 2.59% | 27.25% | 0.59% |
| 3 | Anenii Noi | 46.27% | 28.74% | 23.04% | 33.81% | 6.09% | 4.70% | 0.92% | 0.86% |
| 4 | Basarabeasca | 40.56% | 39.42% | 18.79% | 23.65% | 5.61% | 3.69% | 5.96% | 0.32% |
| 5 | Briceni | 46.78% | 45.26% | 9.39% | 30.63% | 6.71% | 3.97% | 2.35% | 0.37% |
| 6 | Cahul | 42.07% | 33.37% | 24.81% | 25.35% | 5.61% | 4.33% | 2.13% | 1.92% |
| 7 | Cantemir | 38.52% | 24.64% | 24.45% | 31.93% | 7.21% | 3.95% | 3.36% | 1.54% |
| 8 | Călărași | 42.75% | 16.54% | 34.90% | 31.66% | 9.96% | 3.54% | 0.53% | 1.14% |
| 9 | Căușeni | 43.99% | 25.63% | 22.91% | 33.36% | 6.87% | 6.85% | 0.69% | 0.71% |
| 10 | Cimișlia | 39.56% | 23.12% | 26.96% | 33.60% | 7.52% | 4.15% | 1.67% | 0.75% |
| 11 | Criuleni | 50.32% | 16.91% | 38.95% | 26.73% | 8.05% | 4.47% | 0.77% | 2.11% |
| 12 | Dondușeni | 52.47% | 43.82% | 10.87% | 26.58% | 9.05% | 4.38% | 3.30% | 0.48% |
| 13 | Drochia | 47.14% | 34.54% | 15.93% | 27.42% | 7.82% | 5.17% | 6.54% | 0.74% |
| 14 | Dubăsari | 44.00% | 34.17% | 19.18% | 17.22% | 17.02% | 7.66% | 1.12% | 0.88% |
| 15 | Edineț | 50.41% | 36.61% | 10.54% | 35.15% | 9.85% | 3.84% | 2.46% | 0.43% |
| 16 | Fălești | 48.89% | 34.19% | 14.12% | 29.17% | 6.53% | 4.97% | 8.98% | 0.51% |
| 17 | Florești | 47.87% | 30.25% | 14.14% | 38.80% | 6.80% | 5.55% | 2.36% | 0.57% |
| 18 | Glodeni | 46.41% | 31.48% | 12.03% | 31.67% | 11.91% | 3.58% | 6.46% | 1.05% |
| 19 | Hîncești | 41.12% | 14.93% | 34.70% | 39.73% | 3.84% | 3.00% | 0.71% | 1.12% |
| 20 | Ialoveni | 49.36% | 10.66% | 47.34% | 30.79% | 3.50% | 3.77% | 0.69% | 1.22% |
| 21 | Leova | 41.87% | 24.84% | 23.32% | 31.58% | 9.53% | 4.53% | 3.21% | 0.96% |
| 22 | Nisporeni | 47.07% | 6.15% | 17.91% | 72.26% | 0.18% | 1.88% | 0.17% | 0.47% |
| 23 | Ocnița | 52.55% | 55.77% | 6.70% | 20.87% | 7.92% | 4.93% | 2.39% | 0.29% |
| 24 | Orhei | 50.64% | 6.79% | 19.05% | 14.56% | 55.12% | 1.64% | 0.32% | 1.18% |
| 25 | Rezina | 50.91% | 20.38% | 20.88% | 36.29% | 14.39% | 4.52% | 1.02% | 0.73% |
| 26 | Rîșcani | 49.48% | 41.66% | 11.08% | 28.98% | 7.05% | 3.68% | 5.20% | 0.74% |
| 27 | Sîngerei | 45.06% | 29.50% | 19.81% | 26.42% | 12.30% | 4.76% | 4.73% | 0.59% |
| 28 | Soroca | 47.87% | 37.95% | 16.43% | 28.39% | 6.62% | 5.87% | 1.80% | 0.88% |
| 29 | Strășeni | 47.05% | 13.37% | 33.37% | 41.51% | 4.38% | 3.67% | 0.61% | 1.25% |
| 30 | Șoldănești | 51.38% | 17.88% | 16.77% | 42.36% | 14.87% | 4.42% | 0.81% | 1.00% |
| 31 | Ștefan Vodă | 44.79% | 30.96% | 29.62% | 27.00% | 4.27% | 4.23% | 0.90% | 0.66% |
| 32 | Taraclia | 50.45% | 80.34% | 1.10% | 6.64% | 6.86% | 2.89% | 0.90% | 0.39% |
| 33 | Telenești | 46.38% | 11.90% | 36.93% | 29.14% | 14.91% | 3.62% | 0.44% | 1.44% |
| 34 | Ungheni | 48.14% | 27.48% | 25.12% | 31.77% | 6.39% | 5.18% | 1.38% | 0.93% |
| 35 | U.T.A. Găgăuzia | 45.78% | 83.36% | 0.54% | 6.20% | 3.91% | 2.39% | 2.44% | 0.06% |
| 36 | Diplomatic missions (Moldovan diaspora) | N/A | 8.52% | 73.09% | 4.81% | 2.48% | 1.56% | 2.82% | 2.77% |
| Total | | 49.22% | 31.15% | 26.84% | 23.62% | 8.32% | 3.75% | 2.95% | 1.25% |
Source: CEC

=== Voter turnout ===
| Election year | Time | | | | |
| Election year | 9:30 | 12:30 | 15:30 | 18:30 | 21:00 |
|---|---|---|---|---|---|
| 2014 | 4.20% | 20.98% | 39.21% | 51.01% | 55.79% |
| 2019 | 5.80% | 24.00% | 37.41% | 45.65% | 49.24% |
Source: alegeri.md

== Coalition talks ==
Following the elections, both the Socialist Party and Democratic Party proposed forming a coalition with ACUM, with the PDM also proposing that the post of Prime Minister would go to an ACUM member, despite PDM being the larger party. However, following the promises made during the campaign, ACUM refused both offers.

On 8 April, ACUM announced that they would reverse their decision about rejecting coalition negotiations with PSRM.

After the decision, party leaders, Maia Sandu and Andrei Năstase of ACUM, officially invited PSRM to start coalition negotiations. Maia Sandu and Andrei Năstase said that they still rejected coalition negotiations with PDM, but they were willing to negotiate a deal with PSRM.

Further coalition negotiations between ACUM and PSRM resulted in the Sandu cabinet on 8 June, amidst a constitutional crisis.
