= Andrei Năstase =

Moldovan lawyer and politician

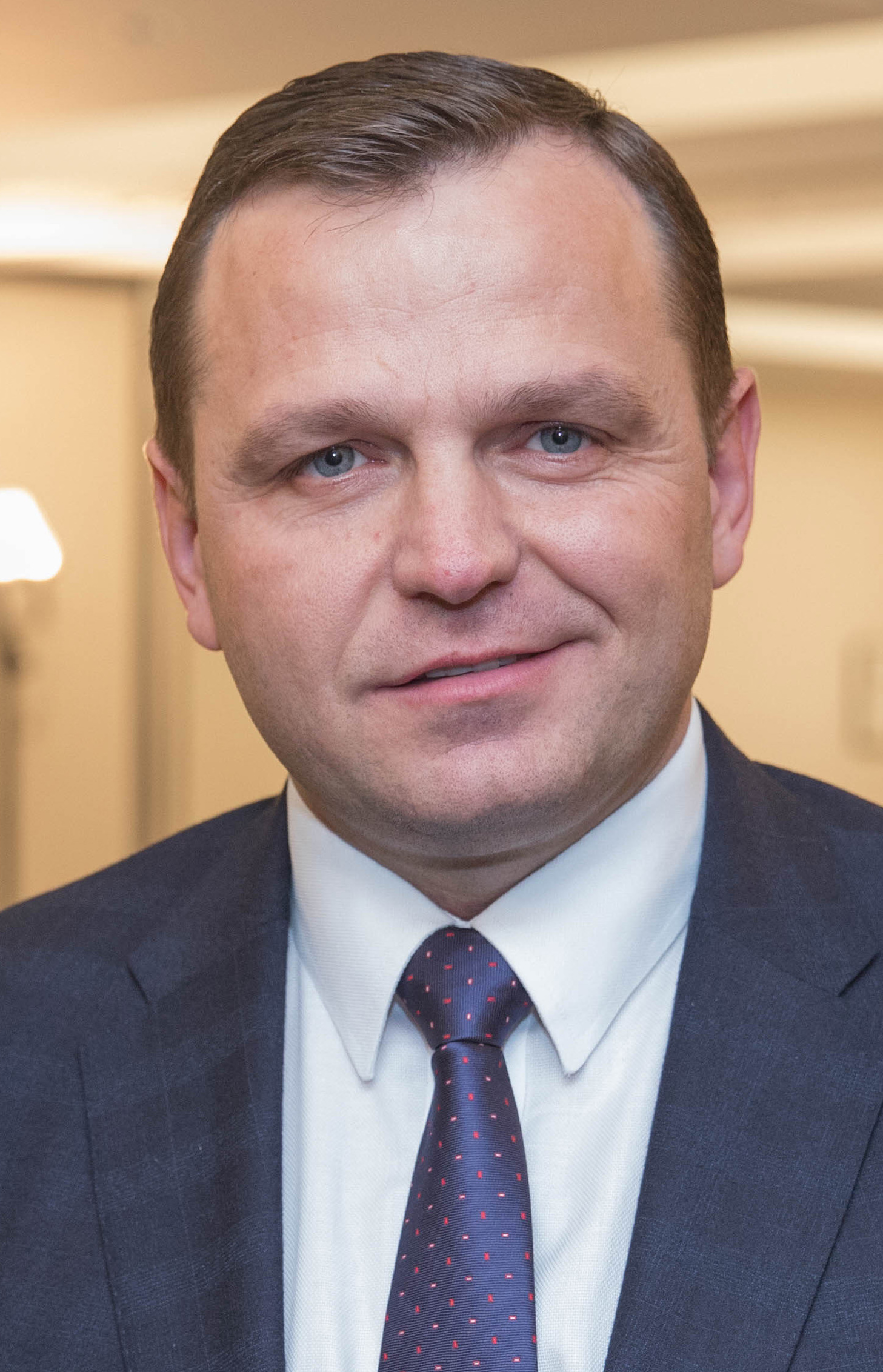
- Năstase in 2017

Member of the Chișinău Municipal Council
- In office 20 October 2019 – 22 November 2023

President of the Dignity and Truth Platform
- In office 13 December 2015 – 13 July 2021
- Succeeded by: Dinu Plîngău

Deputy Prime Minister of Moldova
- In office 8 June 2019 – 12 November 2019
- President: Igor Dodon
- Prime Minister: Maia Sandu
- Succeeded by: Sergiu Pușcuța

Minister of Internal Affairs
- In office 8 June 2019 – 12 November 2019
- President: Igor Dodon
- Prime Minister: Maia Sandu
- Preceded by: Alexandru Jizdan
- Succeeded by: Pavel Voicu

Mayor of Chișinău
- In office 8 October 2019 – 11 November 2019
- Preceded by: Adrian Talmaci (acting)
- Succeeded by: Ion Ceban

Member of the Moldovan Parliament
- In office 9 March 2019 – 8 July 2019
- Succeeded by: Vasile Năstase
- Parliamentary group: Dignity and Truth Platform
- Constituency: Chișinău
- Majority: 14,015 (46.3%)

Personal details
- Born: 6 August 1975 (age 51) Mîndrești, Moldavian SSR, Soviet Union (now Moldova)
- Citizenship: Moldova; Romania
- Party: Dignity and Truth Platform Party (2015–2022)
- Spouse: Angela Năstase (m. 1999)
- Children: 3
- Education: Ștefan cel Mare University of Suceava; Alexandru Ioan Cuza University
- Profession: Lawyer

Andrei Năstase (born 6 August 1975) is a Moldovan politician, activist, and attorney who served as Deputy Prime Minister and Minister of Internal Affairs from 8 June 2019 to 12 November 2019. He was also a member of Parliament of Moldova in 2019. Năstase was the leader of the Dignity and Truth Platform (Platforma DA) from 2015 to 2021.

Andrei Nastase became a marked man due to his role in exposing a criminal network run by the Russian mafia and shady powerful oligarchs which had laundered a $22bn of illicit money. He also became known for mobilising the Moldovan society following the 2014 Moldovan bank fraud scandal, which was a bank fraud involving three banks working together to extract as much loan finance as possible from the banks without any obvious business rationale.

In the 2019 parliamentary election, the ACUM Electoral Bloc, a coalition comprising Năstase's Platforma DA and the Party of Action and Solidarity (PAS) led by Maia Sandu, secured 26 out of 101 parliamentary seats in Moldova. Amidst the 2019 constitutional crisis, Andrei Năstase was named Deputy Prime Minister and Minister of Internal Affairs in the Sandu cabinet. On November 12, 2019, the Sandu cabinet was ousted following a no-confidence vote triggered by the government's decision to bypass its own rules in the appointment process for the General Prosecutor. Năstase openly criticized Sandu for unilaterally overruling its own contest rules without the consultation of coalition partners, a move that was later adjudged unconstitutional and illegal.

== Biography ==
Born on August 6, 1975, in the village of Mîndrești, nowadays in Telenești district, he is the son of Andrei and Anna Năstase. Between 1982 and 1992 Năstase studied at the Mîndrești school, from 1992 until 1993 he has studied at the Faculty of History-Geography of the Ștefan cel Mare University of Suceava, Romania, and between 1993 and 1997 he studied at the Faculty of Law of the Alexandru Ioan Cuza University of Iași, Romania.

== Professional activity ==
From 1997 to 2000, Năstase worked as a prosecutor, employed at the Office of the Chișinău Prosecutor of Transport, initially as interim aid, then as assistant to the transport prosecutor. Not much information about his work in this position is available. In a reply sent to RISE Moldova following an enquiry, the Office of the Prosecutor General of Moldova stated that "in the archives, some documents set up by the assistant of the transport prosecutor, Andrei Năstase, regarding inspections of several aspects of the activity of civil aviation enterprises, including the state enterprise Air Moldova, have been identified". According to the reply of the Office of the Prosecutor General of Moldova, "although, following the controls, a number of derogations were established in the activity of Air Moldova (subordinated to the Civil Aviation Authority, headed in that period by Victor Țopa), no prosecutor's reaction has been taken".

From 2000 to 2002, Năstase worked as a deputy director of the Moldovan-German Joint Undertaking Air Moldova S.R.L. During this time, Air Moldova has been transformed from a state-owned enterprise into a joint venture, a procedure which has drawn accusations of unlawfulness from political analyst Victor Gurău. According to him, the company's shares were taken over by a so-called foreign investor, who had no accounts and did not meet the minimum requirements to form an undertaking. However, subsequent investigations from the Government of Moldova did not come to the same conclusions. The restructuring of the company led to an investment of over 2 million dollars and another 18,6 million dollars for the acquisition of two Embraer-type aircraft. In 2002, after the communist government came back to power and pursued an aggressive renationalization campaign of multiple enterprises, they abusively nationalized Air Moldova, depriving the German investors of their shareholding illegally. Following the decision to renationalize the company, the authorities were forced to pump money into the enterprise, which did not alleviate the company's financial issues. Following the collapse of the communist government in 2009, the company was privatized once again by other investors.

== Political activity ==
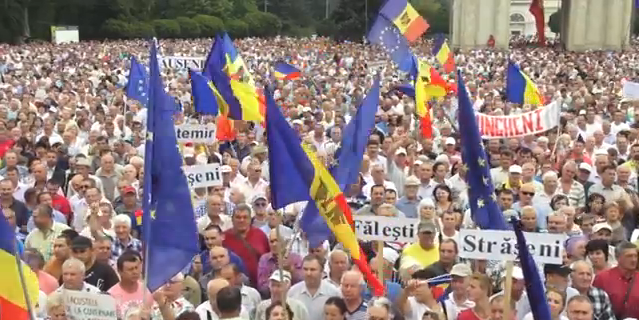
People protesting in support of reforms and a pro-EU government during the 2015 protests.

In early 2015, Năstase, along with several opinion leaders, journalists, lawyers, political scientists, ambassadors, and others, participated in the foundation of the Civic Platform Dignity and Truth. He is also one of the leaders of the protest movement in Moldova in September 2015. On 1 November 2015, he was elected President of the Executive Bureau of the Initiative Group set up to organize the Republican referendum amending the Constitution with regard to the election and direct dismissal of the president by the people, the limitation of parliamentary immunity and the number of deputies from 101 to 71. Năstase has also drafted laws that were subsequently examined and positively endorsed by the Constitutional Court. In December 2015, a part of the Dignity and Truth Platform members, including Năstase, joined the People's Force Party. At the extraordinary congress on 13 December 2015, the party was renamed to Dignity and Truth Platform Party (Partidul Politic "Platforma Demnitate și Adevăr", Platforma DA), elected new governing bodies, and Năstase was elected as party chairman.

=== Republican referendum amending the Constitution 2015 ===
In 2015, the Civic Platform “Dignity and Truth” (DA), led by Andrei Năstase, launched an initiative to revise the Constitution of the Republic of Moldova through a republican referendum, which required at least 10% of the population to sign. The central objective was the restoration of the direct election of the President by citizens, alongside broader institutional reforms concerning accountability of state authorities.

The initiative enjoyed substantial public backing. The initiative group collected approximately 400,000 signatures in support of holding the referendum, while contemporary opinion polls indicated a clear and comfortable majority of respondents favored the direct election of the head of state.

The Central Electoral Commission ultimately dismissed the referendum request on legal grounds related to the admissibility of the proposed constitutional questions. The organizers contested the decision, alleging political interference and claiming that oligarch Vlad Plahotniuc stood behind the blocking of the initiative.

In March 2016, following the broader political context and public pressure surrounding the issue, the Constitutional Court of the Republic of Moldova ruled to restore the direct election of the President. The change was therefore implemented through constitutional adjudication rather than through the referendum procedure initially promoted by the organizers.

=== 2016 Presidential election ===
Andrei Năstase was appointed by the Political National Council of the Dignity and Truth Platform Party to run in the 2016 presidential elections. He was registered on 18 September 2016 as a candidate, the fourth officially registered with the Central Electoral Commission (CEC) for the elections of 30 October 2016. On October 15, 2016, Andrei Năstase, despite some polls showing him having more popular support, officially announced his withdrawal from the race and endorsed Action and Solidarity Party candidate Maia Sandu. The decision to not run in the first round was meant to keep the pro-European vote united and ensure Igor Dodon and Vladimir Plahotniuc do not "Split Moldova amongst themselves for the next period". Despite these efforts, Maia Sandu lost against Igor Dodon in the second round, but the event was classed as new political maturity in Moldovan society and further united the pro-EU front in Moldova.

=== 2017 European People's Party affiliation ===
During Andrei Năstase's leadership, the Dignity and Truth Platform strengthened its ties with European centre-right political structures. In 2017, the party was accepted as an observer member of the European People's Party, the largest political family in the European Union, which brings together Christian-democratic and centre-right parties across Europe.

The affiliation placed the party within the broader network of pro-European political movements and reflected its declared commitment to European integration, democratic reforms, and anti-corruption policies in the Moldova.

=== 2018 Chișinău mayoral election ===
At the 2018 Chișinău mayoral election, after finishing second in the first round with 32.1%, Năstase gained 52.57% of the total number of votes in the runoff, beating Ion Ceban (47.43%). However, on 19 June 2018, the elections were declared void on the grounds of violation of election silence on election day by both candidates, contrary to the provisions of the Electoral Code. This practice to encourage people to vote was, however, customary in Moldovan society since Independence, and came as a shock to International observers and locals, spurring International criticism and massive protests in Chișinău. As such, the mandate of the elected mayor, Andrei Năstase, was not validated by the magistrates of the Center Sector Court in Chișinău, a decision maintained on 21 June 2018 by the Chișinău Court of Appeal, as well as by the Supreme Court of Justice (SCJ), which, on 25 June 2018, gave the final verdict on the validation of the results of the Chișinău elections. On June 29, 2018, the Central Electoral Commission (CEC) also declared void the local elections held in the capital city. Năstase regarded the decision as politically motivated and considered it to be ordered by Vladimir Plahotniuc. Following this decision, the election for the mayor of Chișinău was to be held in 2019, and the position was to be headed by an interim mayor until then.

On October 8, 2019, after the Moldovan constitutional crisis, which led to the departure of oligarchs Vlad Plahotniuc and Ilan Shor, the Chișinău Court of Appeal validated the Andrei Nastase's mandate by overturning the ruling issued by the Chișinău Court that annulled the local elections held in 2018. Shortly after, Nastase resigned from the post as he was the Minister of Internal Affairs at the time.

=== 2019 Parliamentary election and constitutional crisis ===
In the 2019 parliamentary election, Andrei Năstase was a central figure of the pro-European opposition, campaigning as a leading representative of the Dignity and Truth Platform. The party ran as part of the NOW Platform DA and PAS(ACUM), an alliance formed with the Party of Action and Solidarity (PAS), with the stated aim of dismantling oligarchic influence, restoring democratic institutions, and strengthening the rule of law.

The election, held on 24 February 2019 under a newly introduced mixed electoral system, resulted in a fragmented parliament. No party secured an outright majority. The Democratic Party of Moldova emerged with a plurality of seats, followed by the Party of Socialists of the Republic of Moldova and NOW Platform DA and PAS, which positioned itself firmly in opposition to both entrenched political power structures and perceived external influence over state institutions. The block obtained 26 seats in the 101-member Parliament, emerging as the third-largest political force. Within the bloc, the Dignity and Truth Platform secured 12 parliamentary mandates, confirming its position as one of the principal opposition parties. The result reflected significant electoral support for the bloc's anti-corruption and pro-rule-of-law platform, particularly in urban constituencies and among voters critical of the existing political establishment. Andrei Năstase was elected to Parliament as one of the bloc's leading figures and played a prominent role in post-election negotiations.

Following the election, prolonged negotiations over government formation led to the 2019 Moldovan constitutional crisis. After months of political deadlock, ACUM entered into an unexpected governing arrangement with the Party of Socialists of the Republic of Moldova, citing the need to remove the Democratic Party of Moldova from power and to restore constitutional order. Andrei Năstase publicly supported this temporary alliance as a necessary measure to overcome institutional capture and unblock the democratic process. Andrei Năstase was named as the Deputy Prime Minister and Minister of Internal Affairs.

The crisis escalated when the Constitutional Court of Moldova issued a series of controversial rulings, including the suspension of the sitting president and the validation of a parallel government backed by the Democratic Party. These decisions were widely contested domestically and internationally, prompting mass protests and raising concerns about judicial independence. Interestingly, Russia, the European Union and the United States backed the same government, led by ACUM.

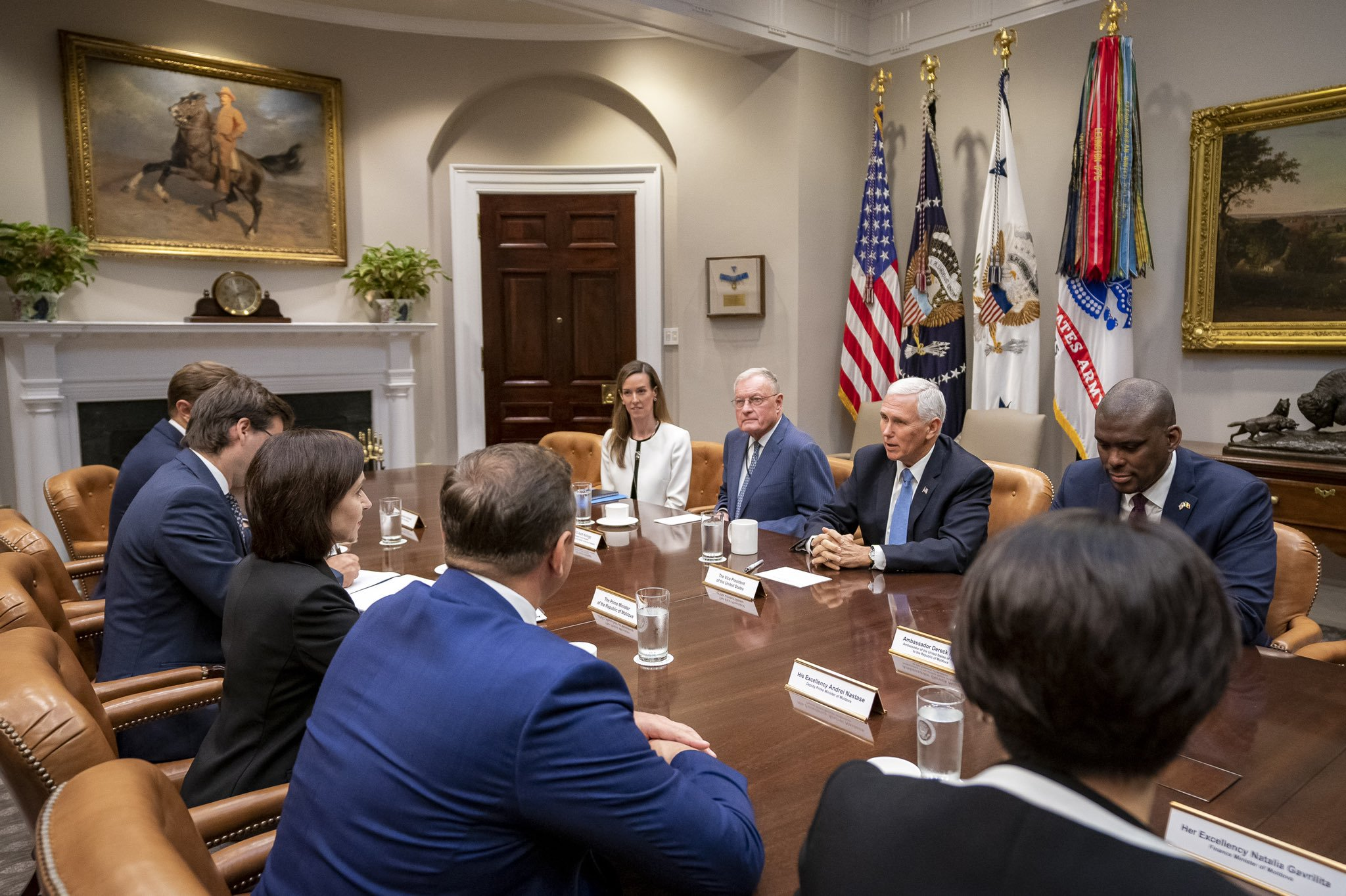
Andrei Nastase and Maia Sandu meet the Trump Administration headed by Vice-president Mike Pence at the White House in 2019.

Năstase and the ACUM leadership rejected the Court's rulings, characterizing them as politically motivated and unconstitutional. The standoff ended after sustained internal pressure and international mediation, leading to the resignation of the Democratic Party government and the recognition of the new parliamentary majority. Shortly thereafter, the Constitutional Court annulled its own earlier decisions and several judges resigned.

The events of 2019 marked a turning point in Moldovan politics. For Andrei Năstase and the Dignity and Truth Platform, the election and ensuing crisis consolidated their role as key actors in the anti-oligarchic movement and underscored their prominence during one of the most acute institutional crises since Moldova's independence.

=== Parliamentary Assembly of the Council of Europe, 2019 ===
During the Parliamentary Assembly of the Council of Europe (PACE) session held from June 24 to 28, 2019, the Republic of Moldova was represented by delegates Andrei Năstase of the Dignity and Truth Platform, Vlad Batrîncea of the Party of Socialists of the Republic of Moldova, and Mihai Popșoi of the Party of Action and Solidarity (PAS). The assembly was poised to deliberate on restoring Russia's membership, which had been suspended following the 2014 Russian annexation of Crimea. Moldovan representatives Năstase and Batrîncea both voted in favor to reinstate Russia to the human rights body, a move that saw substantial backing from a majority of European countries including Germany and France.

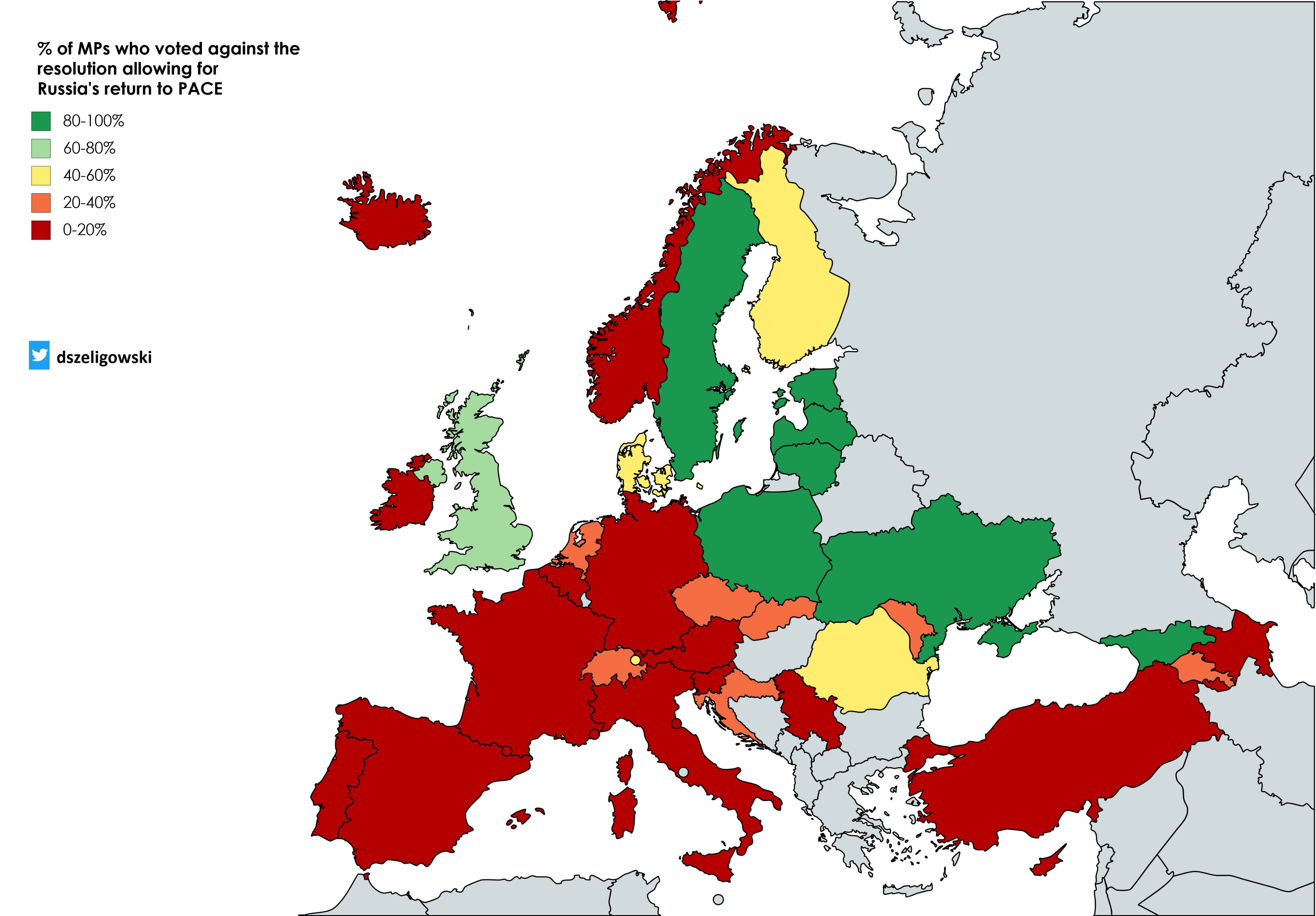
"Which delegations in the Parliamentary Assembly of the Council of Europe voted against the resolution allowing for Russia's return to PACE?

This decision, particularly Năstase's vote, sparked controversy and criticism back home. Former Mayor Dorin Chirtoacă opposed Năstase's stance, calling for his resignation from public offices and the leadership of his party. Defending his decision, Năstase argued that his vote was cast in the spirit of fostering democracy, human rights, and inter-state dialogue within Europe, emphasizing its importance for resolving the Transnistrian conflict and asserting that engagement could lead to positive influences on Russia regarding human rights and security for the oppressed.

Alexandru Roitman, a spokesperson for the Ministry of External Affairs and European Integration, which was represented by PAS, clarified that the Moldovan officials' votes at PACE did not reflect the official of its government. Roitman further stated that the executive branch does not possess the authority to dictate how parliamentarians should vote, highlighting a separation of powers and the differing perspectives within the Moldovan political landscape regarding how it should handle Russia.

=== 2019 Chișinău mayoral election ===
On September 21, 2019, Andrei Năstase initiated his campaign for the upcoming local general elections scheduled for October 20, 2019, under the banner of the ACUM Bloc, a coalition formed by the PAS and Platforma DA parties. However, his campaign faced legal challenges when Valeriu Munteanu, leader of the Save Bessarabia Union and an electoral competitor, filed a lawsuit against Năstase. Munteanu accused Năstase of violating electoral laws by incorporating images of Stephen III of Moldavia and the City Hall in his campaign materials. On October 5, 2019, the Chișinău Court of the Râșcani District ruled that Năstase must remove these images from his promotional content, further prohibiting the use of the disputed materials in his campaign and ordering the destruction of any remaining stock.

In the initial round of the Chișinău mayoral election on October 20, Năstase secured 31.08% of the vote, trailing behind his rival Ion Ceban, who received 40.19%. The subsequent runoff held on November 3 saw Năstase increase his share to 47.61% but ultimately fall short against Ceban, who clinched the mayoralty with 52.39% of the vote.

=== 2020 Presidential election ===
At the start of 2020, Andrei Năstase promoted the idea of there being a joint pro-European candidate for the 2020 elections, a candidate who was not a member of any political party and would be supported by all the right-wing and unionist parties of Moldova. After the negotiations for a joint candidate failed, Năstase announced on 2 March 2020 that he would participate in the presidential elections.

On 3 October 2020, Năstase officially started his campaign. It focused on eradicating corruption, reforming the judiciary, raising the minimum pension to 2500 lei (around 143 USD), improving Moldova's international credibility, building closer ties with the European Union, promoting family values and preserving national culture. Throughout his campaign, Năstase emphasized that, according to opinion polls, he was the only one able to beat incumbent President Dodon in a potential runoff and that Sandu would lose in the second round in the same way she did in the 2016 elections. On 15 October, Năstase publicly asked Sandu to withdraw her candidacy and endorse him for president. Sandu refused his proposal saying that the candidate with the most votes in the first round should be the one facing Dodon in the runoff.

The first round of the presidential election took place on 1 November 2020. Năstase received approximately 3.26% of the vote, finishing outside the top contenders and failing to advance to the second round. Maia Sandu placed first with about 36.16%, followed by Igor Dodon with approximately 32.61%, while Renato Usatîi finished third with around 16.9%.

After his elimination, Năstase announced his unconditional support for his ex-ally Maia Sandu in the second round. The runoff election was held on 15 November 2020, resulting in a victory for Sandu, who won 57.75% of the vote against Dodon's 42.25%, becoming President of the Republic of Moldova.

=== 2021 Parliamentary election ===
In the early parliamentary elections of 11 July 2021, Andrei Năstase participated as leader of the Dignity and Truth Platform Party (PPDA). The party chose to run independently after negotiations aimed at forming a common pro-European electoral bloc failed.

The electoral campaign focused on themes associated with Năstase's earlier civic and governmental activity, including anti-corruption measures, depoliticization of state institutions, justice reform, and dismantling oligarchic influence. The party positioned itself within the pro-European camp but sought to distinguish its platform from that of other reform forces by emphasizing institutional accountability and continuity with the protest movement of 2015–2016.

The elections took place in a polarized political environment dominated by competition between pro-European and pro-Russian political forces. The Party of Action and Solidarity (PAS) won a parliamentary majority, while smaller parties competed around the electoral threshold.

The Dignity and Truth Platform Party obtained 2.33% of the vote and did not enter Parliament as the threshold of 5% was not met. Following the result, Andrei Năstase acknowledged the outcome and announced his withdrawal from the leadership of the party, stating that a new generation should assume responsibility for its future political development while he would continue public activity outside the party's executive leadership.

=== 2024 Presidential election ===
After retiring from politics following the 2021 elections, Andrei Năstase relaunched himself politically as an independent candidate in the 2024 presidential election. His campaign reiterated long-standing commitments to combating corruption, restoring the rule of law, and strengthening Moldova's strategic ties with the European Union.

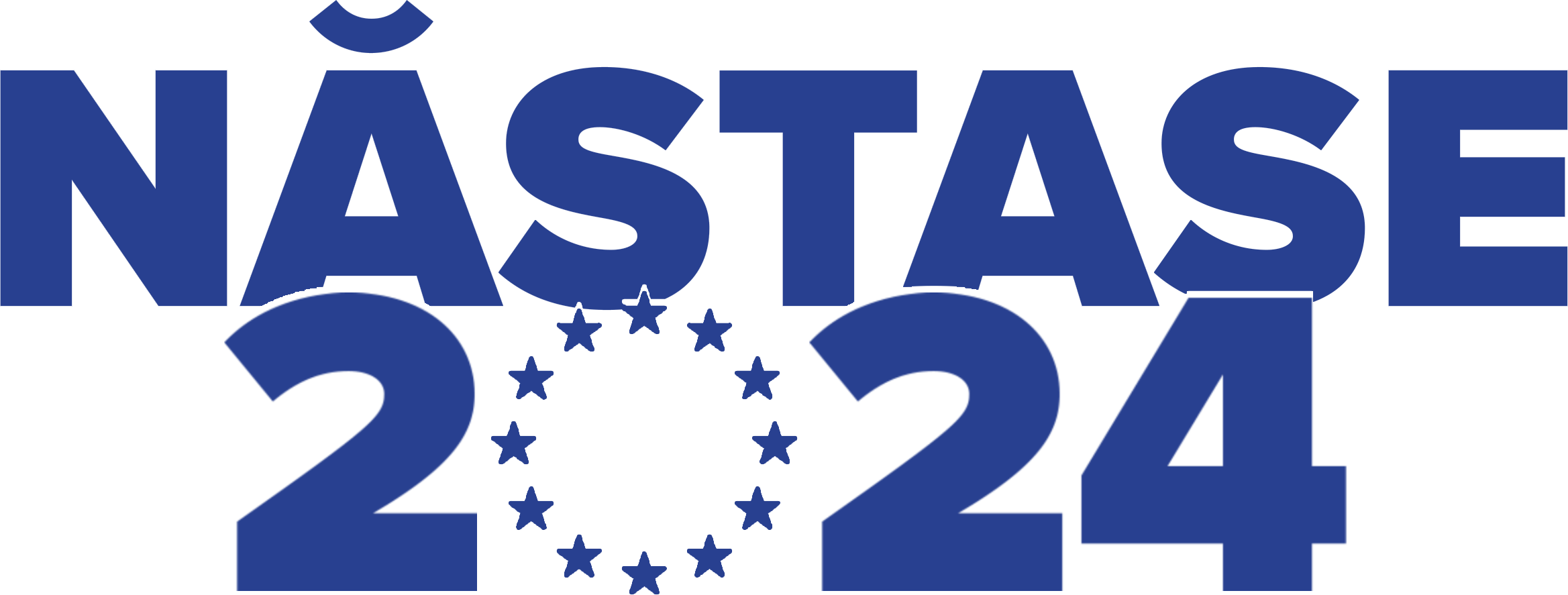
Andrei Năstase 2024 presidential campaign logo.

Although Năstase publicly supported the 2024 Moldovan European Union membership constitutional referendum, he strongly opposed its timing and manner, criticising the decision of President Maia Sandu to call the referendum during a period of heightened political and geopolitical instability. He argued that the initiative was risky, warning that the potential damage of a failed referendum would outweigh its symbolic benefits, particularly given Moldova's vulnerability to external interference. The referendum ultimately passed by a margin of approximately 0.1%, a result that was widely debated and occurred amid allegations of Russian interference, risks that Năstase had repeatedly highlighted during the campaign.

In the first round of the presidential election held on 20 October 2024, Năstase received 0.64% of the vote, finishing ninth and failing to advance to the runoff. Compared to the 2020 election, Năstase chose not to explicitly endorse any candidate, but voice his support for a "European" Moldova.

=== 2025 Parliamentary elections ===
In 2025, Andrei Năstase announced an independent candidacy for the 2025 Moldovan parliamentary election built around a comprehensive programme of state reform in preparation for EU integration, positioning himself as a pro-reform alternative to both entrenched party structures. He entered the campaign with the slogan “Your Voice in Parliament” and the motto “Faith! Courage! Competence!” His campaign focused on institutional efficiency, accountability in public office, and long-term national consolidation. A central pillar of his platform was administrative reform. Năstase proposed a streamlined executive, advocating for a reduction in the number of ministries from 14 to 9, arguing that overlapping competences and excessive bureaucracy weakened governance, diluted responsibility, and fostered political clientelism.

In the legislative sphere, Năstase reiterated his long-standing position on parliamentary reform, calling for a reduction in the number of Members of Parliament from 101 to 61. He linked this proposal to the 2015 civic initiative in which he and his party collected over 405,000 signatures in support of constitutional reform, presenting it as evidence of sustained public demand for a leaner and more accountable legislature.

His platform also addressed inequality within the state apparatus, including a proposal to lower the salaries of top public officials. Năstase argued that public trust could not be rebuilt while senior officials remained insulated from the economic realities faced by the broader population.

On foreign and strategic policy, he advocated closer political, economic, and institutional ties with Romania, framing the relationship as a natural axis of stability, reform transfer, and cultural continuity. He emphasised cooperation in infrastructure, education, justice reform, and energy security, presenting Romania as Moldova's most reliable strategic partner.

Another key proposal was the creation of a "Diaspora Fund", designed to channel the financial resources and expertise of Moldovans abroad into productive investment at home. The fund was conceived as a state-guaranteed but professionally managed instrument, aimed at supporting small and medium-sized enterprises, local development projects, and strategic sectors, while avoiding politicised allocation of resources.

Throughout the campaign, Năstase presented these policies as part of a coherent reform agenda centred on state discipline, national responsibility, and civic participation, arguing that Moldova's modernisation required structural change rather than rhetorical alignment or short-term electoral incentives.

In the election, Andrei Năstase obtained 0.84% of the vote, failing to pass the 2% electoral threshold required for independent candidates to enter the Parliament of Moldova. Despite running as an independent, he managed to place 6th out of 23 candidates, outperforming multiple parties. Năstase previously criticised the threshold as disproportionately high for independents, arguing that it favoured established party structures and limited genuine political pluralism. He maintained that the result did not invalidate the reform agenda he advanced, but rather highlighted structural barriers facing non-party candidates in Moldova's electoral system.

== Legal career ==
Andrei Năstase is a lawyer by profession and founder of his own law office, “Cabinetul Avocatului Andrei Năstase.” His activity has included commercial representation, human rights litigation, and anti-corruption cases. Over time he represented multiple businesspeople and private clients, primarily in disputes alleging abuses by public authorities, as well as companies operating in the Republic of Moldova that claimed to have been subjected to politically motivated investigations or prosecutions.

During the period of his most intense political involvement against the influence attributed to businessman and oligarch Vladimir Plahotniuc, Năstase voluntarily suspended his law practice in order to focus on civic and political activity, citing the need to avoid incompatibility between professional legal work and public action.

Throughout his legal career, he has been publicly characterized as an anti-corruption and human-rights oriented lawyer, while also maintaining activity in the field of business and commercial law.

== Honours & Awards ==
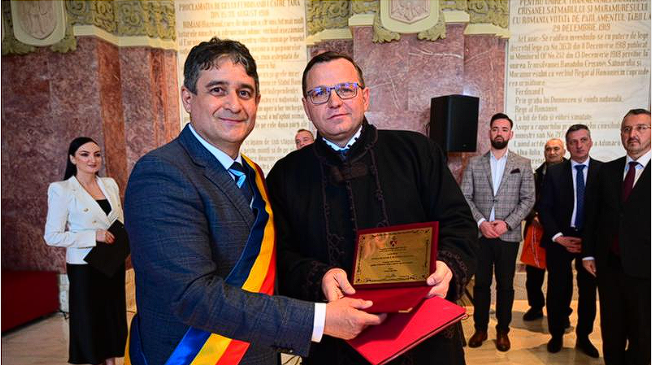
Andrei Nastase receives the Honorary Citizen title from the Mayor of Alba Iulia.

Năstase has received several distinctions in Romania and abroad in recognition of his public activity and advocacy for democratic reforms and closer Moldovan–Romanian relations.

In 2016, he received the Excellence Award from the Asociația Pro Democrația for his contribution to the promotion of democracy, transparency and modern European values in the Moldova.

In January 2019, he was awarded the title of Honorary Citizen of Iași by the Municipal Council of Iași. In May 2019, he also received the title of Honorary Citizen of Suceava from the municipal authorities of Suceava, in recognition of his civic and political activity.

Năstase has also been granted honorary citizenship by several other Romanian cities, including Cluj-Napoca. In Arad he received the award “Credință și Unire” (Faith and Unity) title - a civic distinction awarded by the Arad Local Council to individuals who have contributed to promoting Romanian national unity, strengthening Romanian cultural identity, and supporting relations with Romanian communities outside Romania, particularly in Moldova, reflecting his public profile and engagement with issues related to democratic reform and Moldovan–Romanian cooperation.

In March 2024, he was awarded the title of Honorary Citizen of Alba Iulia by the municipal authorities during events marking the anniversary of the Great Union.

== Book Launch ==
The almanac Numele unei conștiințe (English: The Name of a Conscience), written by political analyst Igor Volnițchi, examines the civic and political activity of Andrei Năstase. The volume compiles interviews, archival materials, and testimonies from public figures in Moldova and Romania. The book was launched in Chișinău on the Independence Day of the Republic of Moldova, on the 31st of August 2026. The event brought together historians, writers, artists, and members of the diaspora. Among the speakers were historian Anatol Țăranu, writer and journalist Tudor Țopa, and composer and academician Gheorghe Mustea. Journalist and politician Vasile Năstase also spoke about political developments in Moldova after the Declaration of Independence of Moldova, including the Transnistria War and the civic protests of 2015 associated with the Dignity and Truth Platform.

According to the author, the project was conceived as part of a broader series of almanacs dedicated to contemporary public figures. The launch concluded with a public discussion and autograph session with attendees.

== Political pressure and family life ==
Allegedly, guns were fired near the lawyer and former prosecutor's family home in the Moldovan capital Chisinau; a hidden camera was later discovered planted inside the house. Cars with number plates from Transnistria, a Russian enclave, followed him daily. His wife and children were harassed.

Doctors suspected Nastase and Sandu were the victim of poisoning. Nastase's test results showed five times the normal level of mercury in his blood after he became suddenly ill. He decided, after recovery, to send his wife and children out of the country for their safety.

Năstase is married to Angela Năstase and has three children. His brother, Vasile Năstase, is a journalist, former MP of the first parliament of Moldova, and one of the people who has signed the Declaration of Independence of Moldova. Năstase is the godson of the businessman Victor Țopa.

== Controversies ==
As a lawyer, he is known for defending various domestic and foreign investors in national and international courts, such as the German company Unistar, but also those of businessmen Viorel and Victor Topa. This was used in a long-standing smear campaign against Năstase, portraying the two businessmen as fugitive cousins, despite the two being unrelated. The smear campaign was conducted via the media holdings owned by oligarch Vlad Plahotniuc. A Rise imvestigation sheds light on the real reason why Plahotniuc wanted Năstase labelled as "The Man of Țopas". Viorel Topa and Victor Topa were illegally stripped of their assets at Victoriabank by Plahotniuc, then blackmailed and forced to seek refuge in Germany. German authorities refuse to extradite them arguing that the Topa's cases are classed as political persecution.

Media owned by Plahotniuc wrote that the Open Dialogue Foundation, led by activist Lyudmyla Kozlovska and allegedly funded by Kazakh businessman and politician Muhtar Abliazov, has paid for flight tickets to Brussels for Năstase and Maia Sandu. They claim the two have benefited from funding from the foundation without properly declaring it. Kozlovska was politically persecuted by Plahotniuc's PD, later dropped after Plahotniuc fled Moldova upon losing the parliamentary majority in the 2019 elections.

According to statements made by the Liberal Party leader, Dorin Chirtoacă, Năstase would have harmed Moldova with a loss worth €7 million. He refers to the involvement of Andrei Nastase in the privatization of state company Air Moldova, through which the German company Unistar Ventures, allegedly managed by Victor Țopa, acquired 49% of the airline's shares. This is, in fact, Andrei Năstase, acting as their lawyer, and winning the case at the European Court of Human Rights, who forced the Moldovan to pay back material damages caused to the plaintiffs.

At Andrei Năstase's request, appointed as Minister of the Ministry of the Internal Affairs, Gheorge Balan, a former judge known for his criticism against corruption in the judiciary during Plahotniuc's rule, has been appointed as interim Head of the General Police Inspectorate at the first meeting of the new Government, when Alexandru Pînzari was dismissed. Later, Andrei Năstase has introduced the new interim head of the GPI, who has invited his subordinates to the parliament. Soon after, Năstase confirmed that he and Gheorghe Balan are in kinship affinity relations (one of several godparents) but that he is qualified to continue as interim Head until the recruitment process finalises. Soon after, the Sandu Cabinet was voted out which had a ripple effect across all institution appointments. Gheorghe Balan has recognized that he and Andrei Năstase are in affinity relations (are the godparents). The newly appointed Minister of Internal Affairs has stated to the media "that the affinity that is having Mr. Balan did not have anything in common with his appointment for the position of the acting head of the GPI… shortly after a competition will be arranged."

On February 21, 2019, Andrei Năstase and the candidates of the ACUM electoral bloc, both of the national and uninominal constituency, have signed the public commitment according to which after Parliamentary elections of February 24, 2019 they would not make any coalition with the Party of Socialists, Democratic Party and Shor Party, and if this commitment will be violated they resign from as MPs mandate. After PAS made the unilateral decision to coalise with PSRM to oust Plahotniuc, Platforma DA agreed to accept PSRM votes for the Sandu Cabinet, but insisted on a series of public commitments and anti-oligarchic laws package.

Following a conflict with his party colleagues, Andrei Năstase has not been a member of the Dignity and Truth Platform Party since 2022.

According to David Smith, an American journalist based in Moldova, Andrei Năstase and one of his supporters in the 2024 presidential election campaign, Stanislav Pavlovschi, promoted PR campaigns in the Western countries aimed at undermining Moldova's European integration goals and spreading narratives critical of the Moldovan government—led by Party of Action and Solidarity (PAS)—and President Maia Sandu. Some of these materials were paid placements or recycled content produced by PR companies (e.g., Advocacy Impact, Broken Pot Media), while the NGO International Center for the Protection of Human Rights and Democracy (ICPHRD), founded in 2024 by Pavlovschi, organized events and campaigns along the same lines. In terms of the actors involved and the themes used in these PR campaigns, there were overlaps with structures associated with Ilan Shor, and the visibility of ICPHRD conferences helped lend international credibility to these messages. Smith notes that, although he cannot prove direct links between all these initiatives, they represent an effort to influence Western debates about the Republic of Moldova, with the potential to compromise the country's goal of European integration. Andrei Năstase reacted multiple times to these accusations, replying that it was in the interest of Maia Sandu and the Party of Action and Solidarity (PAS) to monopolise the pro-EU vote, and label everybody else as anti-EU or pro-Russian.

In the context of Dinu Plîngău's resignation as president of the Dignity and Truth Platform Party (PPDA) and his decision to participate in the 2025 parliamentary elections on the Party of Action and Solidarity (PAS) list, he responded to accusations made by Andrei Năstase against him and PPDA. Plîngău stated that Năstase had attempted to negotiate with Ilan Shor and Igor Dodon in order to obtain the position of prime minister. Journalist Alexandru Cozer, asked during a show hosted by vlogger Nicolae Chicu about Plîngău's statements, asserted that in 2021, when Andrei Năstase was still a member of the Parliament, he had tried to secure the support of Shor's and Dodon's political groups in order to be elected prime minister. However, none of these accusations have been proven.
