= Viorel Melnic =

Moldovan politician and economist

Member of the Moldovan Parliament
- In office 9 March 2019 – 17 July 2019
- Succeeded by: Vitalie Evtodiev
- Constituency: Left Bank of the Dniester
- Majority: 11,961 (64.0%)

Deputy Minister of Economy and Trade
- In office 18 October 2006 – 24 December 2009
- President: Vladimir Voronin; Mihai Ghimpu (acting)
- Prime Minister: Vasile Tarlev; Zinaida Greceanîi; Vitalie Pîrlog (acting); Vlad Filat
- Minister: Igor Dodon; Valeriu Lazăr

Personal details
- Born: 1975 (age 50–51)
- Occupation: Politician, economist

Viorel Melnic (born 1975) is a Moldovan politician and economist.

== Biography ==
Melnic was born in 1975. He was the Deputy Minister of Economy and Trade in 2006 and the head of the Customs Service of the Republic of Moldova from 2008 to 2009. Until 2015, he was a member of the Party of Socialists of the Republic of Moldova (PSRM); he would have been kicked out of the party after its leader Igor Dodon learned of Melnic's involvement in fraudulent schemes related to the 2014 Moldovan bank fraud scandal.

In early 2016, Melnic was appointed public policy advisor for economic issues during Moldovan oligarch and politician Ilan Shor's mayorship. Melnic also associated with Shor regarding businesses in Kyrgyzstan. Melnic became a member of the Parliament of Moldova after winning the seat of the 48th electoral constituency, destined for residents in the south of Transnistria, during the 2019 Moldovan parliamentary election of February, but he resigned in July shortly after both Shor and Moldovan oligarch and politician Vladimir Plahotniuc left Moldova.

On 7 September 2025, according to Moldovan newspaper Ziarul de Gardă, Melnic was detained in an operation related to cases of illegal political party funding, electoral corruption and money laundering. As of the next day, between both days, over 60 searches had been carried out and 15 people had been detained. According to the National Anti-Corruption Center (CNA), the suspects were allegedly involved in voter recruitment activities, promising them money, goods, services or other benefits in exchange of voting for a particular party.

On 15 September, right before the 2025 Moldovan parliamentary election on 28 September, Melnic and 12 other suspects of illegal party financing were placed in preventive detention for 30 days. His release from prison was not made public, with him later refusing to answer questions from the press about his status in the case of which he was a suspect or when he was released. Free by then, Melnic appeared at the Buiucani Courthouse in Chișinău on 15 January 2026 regarding a separate case, dealing with the 2014 bank fraud, as a witness for Plahotniuc.
