= Sandu Cabinet =

Government of Moldova

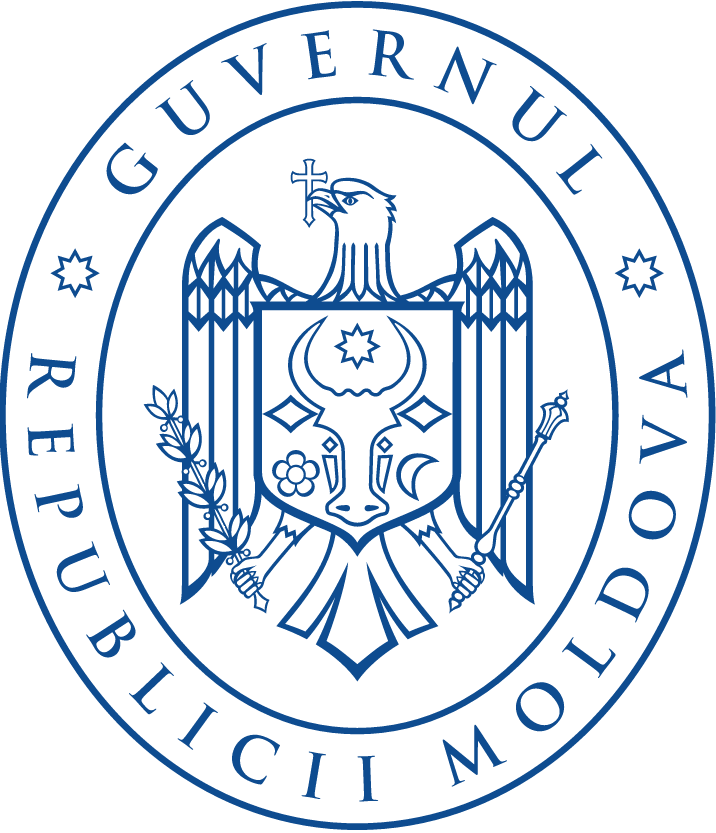
- 18th Cabinet of Moldova

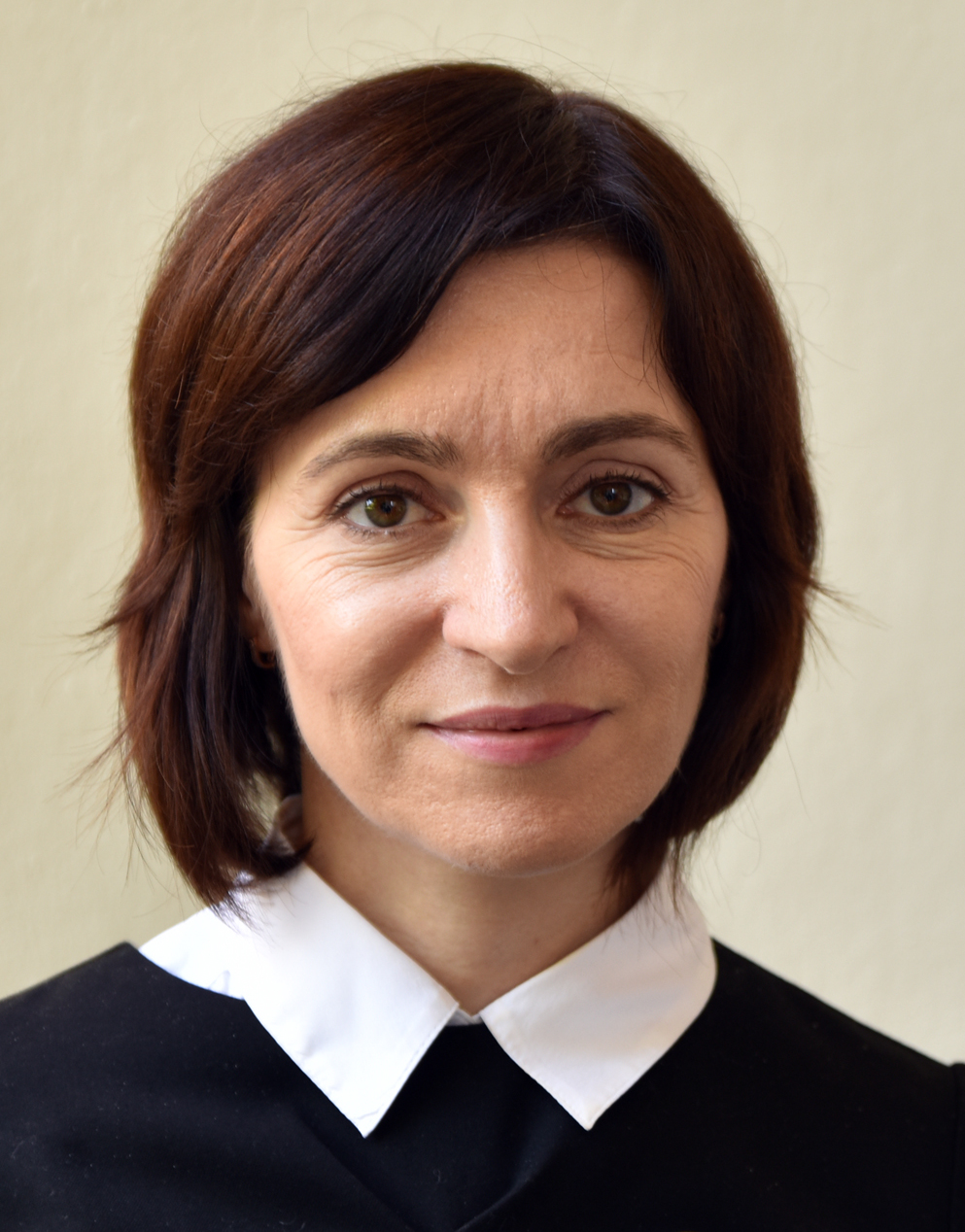
- Prime Minister Maia Sandu
- Date formed: 8 June 2019
- Date dissolved: 14 November 2019

People and organisations
- Head of state: Igor Dodon
- Head of government: Maia Sandu
- Deputy head of government: Andrei Năstase; Vasilii Șova
- No. of ministers: 9
- Ministers removed: 1
- Total no. of members: 12
- Member parties: PPDA; PAS; PSRM
- Status in legislature: Temporary coalition
- Opposition parties: PDM; Șor Party
- Opposition leaders: Pavel Filip; Ilan Shor

History
- Outgoing election: 2019
- Predecessor: Filip Cabinet
- Successor: Chicu Cabinet

The Sandu Cabinet was a six-month Cabinet of Moldova in later 2019, led by Maia Sandu of the Party of Action and Solidarity.

== History ==
It was inaugurated on 8 June 2019, in the middle of the 2019 Moldovan constitutional crisis when the Constitutional Court of Moldova declared unconstitutional her designation for this position as well as the appointment of the Government of the Republic of Moldova. However on 15 June 2019, the Constitutional Court revised and repealed its previous decisions declaring the Sandu Cabinet to have been constitutionally created. It was ousted in a motion of no confidence in the Parliament of Moldova on 12 November that same year and subsequently replaced by a government headed by Ion Chicu. The reason for the government collapse was the draft law assumed by the government to delegate a part of its plenary powers to the Prime Minister to propose a "short list" with the candidates for Prosecutor General's position. President Igor Dodon mentioned that by assuming this powers by Government, the ACUM bloc violated the agreement made with the PSRM which clearly stipulated that the applicants for the position of Prosecutor General are selected by an expert committee.

== Composition ==
Prime Minister and Deputy Prime Ministers in the Sandu cabinet
Title	Minister		Term of office		Party
Title	Image	Name	Start	End	Party
Prime Minister		Maia Sandu	8 June 2019	14 November 2019	PAS
Deputy Prime Minister		Andrei Năstase	8 June 2019	14 November 2019	PPDA
Deputy Prime Minister for Reintegration		Vasilii Șova	8 June 2019	14 November 2019	PSRM

Ministers in the Sandu cabinet
Title	Minister		Term of office		Party
Title	Image	Name	Start	End	Party
Minister of Agriculture, Regional Development and Environment		Georgeta Mincu	8 June 2019	14 November 2019	Independent
Minister of Defense		Pavel Voicu	8 June 2019	14 November 2019	PSRM
Minister of Economy and Infrastructure		Vadim Brînzan	8 June 2019	14 November 2019	Independent
Minister of Education, Culture and Research		Liliana Nicolaescu-Onofrei	8 June 2019	14 November 2019	PAS
Minister of Finance		Natalia Gavrilița	8 June 2019	14 November 2019	PAS
Minister of Foreign Affairs and European Integration		Nicu Popescu	8 June 2019	14 November 2019	Independent
Minister of Health, Labour and Social Protection		Ala Nemerenco	8 June 2019	14 November 2019	Independent
Minister of Internal Affairs		Andrei Năstase	8 June 2019	14 November 2019	PPDA
Minister of Justice		Stanislav Pavlovschi	8 June 2019	24 June 2019	PPDA
Minister of Justice		Olesea Stamate	24 June 2019	14 November 2019	Independent
Governor of Gagauzia		Irina Vlah	15 April 2015	19 July 2023	Independent

The Başkan (Governor) of Gagauzia is elected by universal, equal, direct, secret and free suffrage on an alternative basis for a term of 4 years. One and the same person can be a governor for no more than two consecutive terms. The Başkan of Gagauzia is confirmed as a member of the Moldovan government by a decree of the President of Moldova.

Preceded by Filip Cabinet	Cabinet of Moldova; 8 June 2019 – 14 November 2019	Succeeded by Chicu Cabinet
