= Dignity and Truth Platform =

Moldovan political party

Dignity and Truth Platform Platforma Demnitate și Adevăr
- Abbreviation: PPDA, PPPDA
- President: Liviu Vovc
- Secretary-General: Igor Serotila
- Vice Presidents: Constantin Boeșteanu; Olga Caraman
- Founder: Andrei Năstase
- Founded: 21 April 2013; 13 years ago
- Registered: 13 December 2015; 10 years ago
- Headquarters: 135 Columna Street, Chișinău
- Membership: 14,000
- Ideology: Liberalism; Anti-corruption; Pro-Europeanism
- Political position: Centre-right
- National affiliation: Together (2024–2025)
- European affiliation: European People's Party
- Colours: Light blue (since 2022); Maroon (until 2022)
- Slogan: Patriotism, Responsabilitate, Prosperitate ('Patriotism, Responsibility, Prosperity')
- Parliament: 2 / 101
- District Presidents: 0 / 32

Website
- platformada.md

The Dignity and Truth Platform Party (Romanian: Partidul Politic „Platforma Demnitate și Adevăr”, PPDA or PPPDA), stylized as Platforma DA or YES Platform, is a centre-right, liberal political party in Moldova promoting pro-Europeanism and anti-corruption.

Established as the Force of the People Party in December 2015 during the 2015–2016 protests in Moldova and founded by lawyer and former prosecutor Andrei Năstase, the party calls for far-reaching change in the political establishment. The party became an observer member of the European People's Party (EPP) in 2017.

== History ==
Former party logo

On 24 February 2015, an initial group that consisted of 14 people, including journalists, analysts, and social activists, announced the creation of a movement they called the Dignity and Truth Platform. The stated purpose of this movement was to serve as a government watchdog. Platforma DA has organized meetings in which people have expressed their dissatisfaction with the government. Almost one year after the protests, the leaders of the Platform decided to create a new political party.

On 14 April 2024, Platforma DA formed the Together bloc with three other parties, the Party of Change, the League of Cities and Communes (LOC) and the Coalition for Unity and Welfare, focused on "guaranteeing the European path of the Republic of Moldova, neutralize political risks and unite society". Later that year, the bloc ran a candidate in the 2024 presidential election, Octavian Țîcu, who would finish 8th with 0,93% of the vote. The bloc would continue for the 2025 parliamentary election, however, on 18 July, Platforma DA's leader Dinu Plîngău had announced that the party would not participate in the parliamentary election altogether and instead would have two of its members, Plîngău himself and Stela Macari, run on the list of the Party of Action and Solidarity.

On 28 June 2026, both Plîngău and Macari would return to the party, which they left shortly after joining the PAS parliamentary list in July 2025.

== Ideology ==
The party leadership has expressed opposition to what they characterized as the "oligarchic mafia government" of Vladimir Plahotniuc. They support early elections to form a pro-European Union reformist government and hold a centre-right standpoint against corruption in Moldova.

== Leadership ==
- President – Liviu Vovc (since 2026)
- Vice Presidents – Constantin Boeșteanu, Olga Caraman (since 2026)
- Secretary-General – Igor Serotila (since 2026)

== Election results ==
Parliament
Election	Leader	Performance					Rank	Government
Election	Leader	Votes	%	± pp	Seats	+/–	Rank	Government
2014	Nicolae Chirtoacă	12,110	0.76%	New	0 / 101	New	10th	Extra-parliamentary; APME (PLDM–PDM)
2014	Nicolae Chirtoacă	12,110	0.76%	New	0 / 101	New	10th	Extra-parliamentary; AIE III (PLDM–PDM)–PL
2014	Nicolae Chirtoacă	12,110	0.76%	New	0 / 101	New	10th	Extra-parliamentary (PDM–PPEM–PL)
2019	Andrei Năstase	380,181	26.84% (ACUM) (Note: NOW Platform DA and PAS won 26 seats; 15 went to the PAS and 11 to the PPDA.)	▲3.10	11 / 101	▲11	3rd	Coalition; ACUM (PAS–PPDA)–PSRM)
2019	Andrei Năstase	380,181	26.84% (ACUM)	▲3.10	11 / 101	▲11	3rd	Opposition (PSRM–PDM)
2021	Andrei Năstase	34,181	2.33%	▼24.51	0 / 101	▼11	5th	Extra-parliamentary (PAS)
2025	Dinu Plîngău	did not contest (Note: Initially, the party was supposed to run in the Together bloc, however, on 18 July 2025 the party renounced participating in the parliamentary election and agreed to include two of its own candidates, the party leader, Dinu Plîngău, and Stela Macari, within the PAS' list.)						Extra-parliamentary (PAS)

President
Election	Candidate	First round		Second round		Result
Election	Candidate	Votes	%	Votes	%	Result
2016	Endorsed Maia Sandu (PAS)	549,152	38.71%	766,593	47.89%	Lost ✗
2020	Andrei Năstase	43,924	3.26%			Lost ✗
2024	Endorsed Octavian Țîcu (BÎ)	14,326	0.93%			Lost ✗
