= NOW Platform DA and PAS =

NOW Platform DA and PAS ACUM Platforma DA și PAS
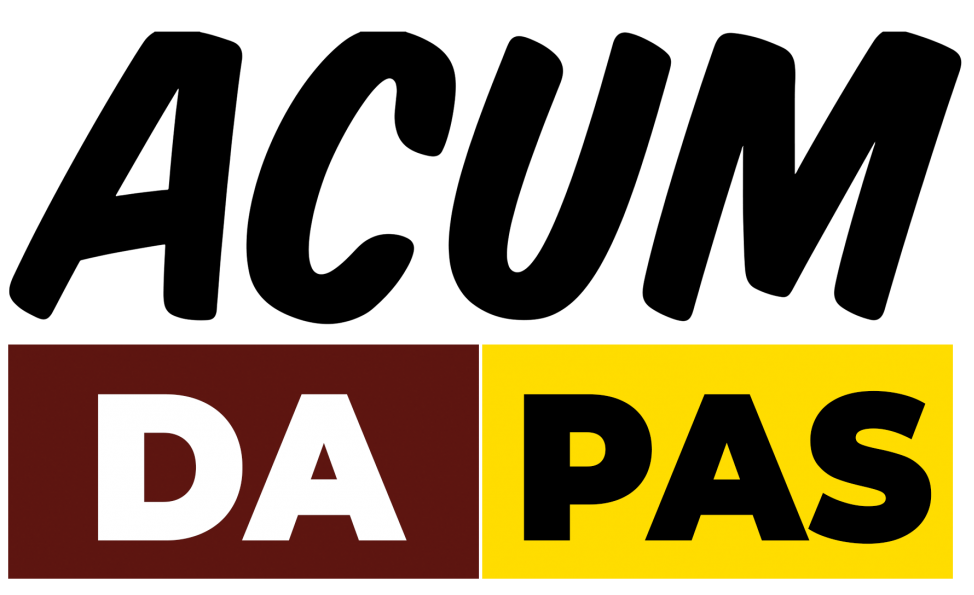
- Abbreviation: ACUM
- President: Andrei Năstase (PPDA); Maia Sandu (PAS)
- Founded: 16 December 2018
- Dissolved: November 2019 (de facto)
- Headquarters: Chișinău
- Ideology: Liberalism; Anti-corruption; Atlanticism; Pro-Europeanism
- Political position: Centre-right
- European affiliation: European People's Party
- Member parties: Dignity and Truth Platform; Party of Action and Solidarity; Liberal Democratic Party of Moldova; National Unity Party
- Colours: Yellow and maroon
- Seats in the 10th Parliament: 26 / 101

Website
- acum.md

NOW Platform DA and PAS (Romanian: Blocul electoral „ACUM Platforma DA și PAS”, ACUM) was a centre-right liberal political alliance in the Republic of Moldova between two pro-European, anti-corruption parties, Party of Action and Solidarity (PAS) and Dignity and Truth Platform Party (PPDA) formed with the aim of joint participation in the 2019 Moldovan parliamentary election.

== History ==
Since 2016, the idea of strengthening pro-European and anti-corruption forces has been circulated, and in 2017 opposition parties PAS and the DA Platform announced that they would form a common platform for the 2019 Moldovan parliamentary election. The strengthening of opposition forces also reflected in the designation of a joint candidate from the PAS and the DA platform for 2016 Moldovan presidential election and for the 2018 Chișinău mayoral election. Following the invalidity of the mayor's election, won by the joint candidate Andrei Năstase, the PAS, DA Platform Party, and LDPM announced the creation of the National Resistance Movement "Now".

On 16 December 2018, the PAS and the DA Platform, Maia Sandu and Andrei Năstase, signed the agreement establishing ACUM for the parliamentary elections of 24 February 2019, and on 21 December 2018 the bloc was registered by the Central Electoral Commission of the Republic of Moldova. The Liberal Democratic Party (PLDM) then joined the bloc "NOW DA/PAS", and some representatives of the PLDM found themselves in the list of the bloc's candidates on the national constituencies, and others will run from the bloc in some uninominal districts. In turn, the Liberal Democratic Party of Moldova (PLDM) and the National Unity Party (PUN) declared unconditional support for ACUM.

The bloc was de facto dissolved in November 2019 after PAS unilaterally terminated the agreement.

== Structure ==
According to its founding agreement, the electoral bloc "NOW Platform DA and PAS" is headed by the Political Council consisting of 8 members, of which:

1. 2 co-presidents of the Political Council – Maia Sandu and Andrei Năstase; The co-Chairpersons of the Political Council are also co-Chairpersons of the electoral bloc;
2. 6 members of the Political Council – Liliana Nicolăescu-Onofrei, Igor Grosu, Mihai Popșoi, Alexandru Slusari, Inga Grigoriu, Cyril Moțpan.

== Electoral results ==
Parliament
Election	Leader	Performance					Rank	Government
Election	Leader	Votes	%	± pp	Seats	+/–	Rank	Government
2019	Maia Sandu and Andrei Năstase	380,181	26.84%	New	26 / 101	New	3rd	Coalition (ACUM: (PAS-PPPDA)-PSRM)
2019	Maia Sandu and Andrei Năstase	380,181	26.84%	New	26 / 101	New	3rd	Opposition (PSRM-PDM)
