= Ludmila Guzun =

Moldovan politician (1961–2021)

Member of the Moldovan Parliament
- In office 9 March 2019 – 16 April 2021
- Parliamentary group: Democratic Party
- Constituency: Ungheni
- Majority: 10,048 (33.7%)

Personal details
- Born: 26 June 1961 Pîrlița, Moldavian SSR, Soviet Union
- Died: 16 April 2021 (aged 59) Chișinău, Moldova
- Party: Democratic Party of Moldova

Ludmila Guzun (26 June 1961 – 16 April 2021) was a Moldovan politician, who served as a Deputy of the Moldovan Parliament for the Ungheni District.

== Deputy in Parliament ==
Guzun was elected to the Moldovan Parliament on 24 February 2019 representing the Democratic Party of Moldova.

== Death ==
On 7 April 2021, Guzun tested positive for COVID-19 and was hospitalized in intensive care. She died from complications related to the virus at 03:00 on 16 April 2021.
