= Together (political bloc) =

Pro-European political bloc in Moldova

Together Împreună
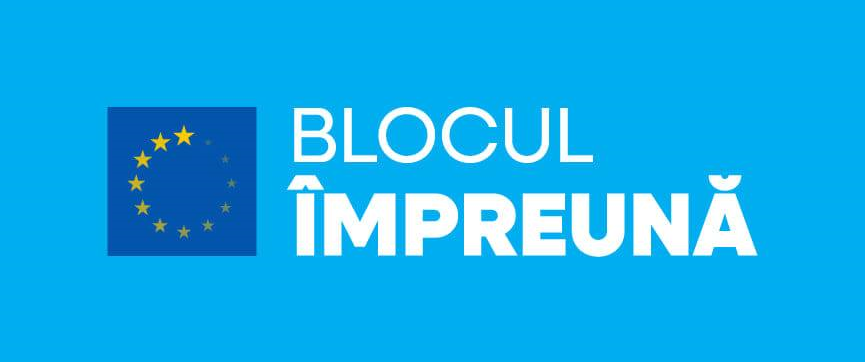
- Founder: Alexandru Bujorean; Ștefan Gligor; Igor Munteanu; Dinu Plîngău
- Founded: 14 April 2024
- Ideology: Pro-Europeanism
- Political position: Centre-right
- Member parties: Party of Change; Ecologist Green Party; Formerly: Coalition for Unity and Welfare (until August 2024); League of Cities and Communes (until July 2025); Dignity and Truth Platform (until July 2025)
- Colours: Light blue

Together (Romanian: Blocul electoral "Împreună", lit. '"Together" electoral bloc') is a pro-European political bloc in Moldova composed by the Party of Change (PS) and the Ecologist Green Party (PVE). The bloc was created in the context of the 2024 presidential and 2025 parliamentary elections in Moldova with the aim of representing a pro-European alternative to the then ruling Party of Action and Solidarity (PAS).

The bloc previously included three other members: the Dignity and Truth Platform (PPDA), the League of Cities and Communes (LOC) and the Coalition for Unity and Welfare (CUB), with the latter abandoning the bloc in August 2024 and the other two in July 2025. These three parties and the PS founded the bloc on 14 April 2024, with the PVE joining later in March 2025.

Together supported Octavian Țîcu as its candidate for the 2024 presidential election, in which he obtained 0.93% of the votes, placing eighth. The bloc and its four original members were the initiators of the Pact for Europe, a document signed by 14 Moldovan parties on 26 May 2024. Inspired in Romania's Snagov Declaration, the pact's signatory parties pledged to support Moldova's accession into the European Union (EU) and European integration process.

== History ==
=== Formation and Pact for Europe ===
The Together political bloc was formed on 14 April 2024 by four Moldovan pro-European parties: the Dignity and Truth Platform (PPDA), led by Dinu Plîngău; the Party of Change (PS), led by Ștefan Gligor; the League of Cities and Communes (LOC), with Alexandru Bujorean as co-president; and the Coalition for Unity and Welfare (CUB), led by Igor Munteanu. The bloc was formed in view of the 2024 presidential and 2025 parliamentary elections in Moldova. According to the representatives of the bloc's parties, Together came "to guarantee the European path of the Republic of Moldova, neutralize political risks and unite society", with Munteanu stating that one of the bloc's objectives was to restore society's trust in the political class.

All four parties supported Moldova's accession into the European Union (EU), while also being critical of the then ruling Party of Action and Solidarity (PAS) for "monopolizing" the country's European trajectory as they stated. According to Gligor, the name "Together" "honors the will of our citizens of unifying the pro-European political forces", while the bloc's logo, a blue rectangle with stars, symbolized "[EU] member states and those in the process of European integration, arranged increasingly into the shape of a circle".

The Together bloc was formed with the aim of consolidating the right of the Moldovan political spectrum in the context of the then upcoming 2024 presidential and 2025 parliamentary elections, with it seeking to represent a democratic alternative to the ruling PAS while also maintaining the same pro-European perspective for Moldova. The PPDA, the PS and the LOC had already announced the formation of a "political and electoral partnership" for both elections at the end of 2023, with the CUB later joining them.

Furthermore, on the day of the bloc's founding, its leaders signed the so-called Pact for Europe (Romanian: Pactul pentru Europa), a political document initiated by Together's leaders in which they confirmed their commitment to continuing Moldova's accession into the EU. The pact was inspired by the Snagov Declaration, signed by Romania's political forces before the country's accession into the EU. Bujorean stated that the pact was open to all pro-European forces willing to publicly assume the obligation of contributing to Moldova's strategic objective of European integration. He urged political parties, civil society and the academic and cultural medium to participate in the finalization of the final text of the pact. On 26 May, 14 Moldovan political parties, including Together's four members as well as the PAS among others, signed the Pact for Europe at the Blue Hall of the National History Museum of Moldova in Chișinău in the presence of several ambassadors and representatives of civil society.

=== 2024 presidential election ===
On 4 August, Together announced that its candidate for the 2024 presidential election would be Moldovan historian and politician Octavian Țîcu. He was not a member of any of the bloc's parties at the time, having been in the past a member of the Parliament of Moldova and the leader of the National Unity Party (PUN), the goal of which was the unification of Moldova and Romania. Țîcu was selected through an internal vote within the bloc, in which Gligor and Munteanu also participated, with Țîcu receiving the most votes from members of the four parties.

On 9 August, Munteanu announced that the CUB had left Together and withdrawn its support for Țîcu and that it would nominate its own candidate for the presidential election. Munteanu stated that "CUB does not accept as candidate a person whose statements generate political controversy" and accused Țîcu of docility towards the ruling PAS government. In reaction, the other components of the bloc claimed that the CUB's withdrawal was an act of "sabotage" behind which would be "the harmful influences of the fugitive oligarchs", and that the withdrawal of support for Țîcu was due to Munteanu's "personal frustrations and ambitions". Regarding this episode, Moldovan political analyst Nicolae Negru commented that, in Moldova, personal political ambitions and a lack of political culture can lead to the disintegration of political blocs. Posteriorly, the Together bloc was registered on 12 September as a participant in the 2024 Moldovan European Union membership constitutional referendum, which took place on 20 October, with the bloc supporting the "yes" option.

In his election campaign, the main ideas that Țîcu promoted were the following: a favorable solution to the Transnistria conflict and the reintegration of Transnistria into Moldova; increased international credibility of Moldova, including through the support of Ukraine's independence and territorial integrity and the condemnation of the Russian invasion of Ukraine; Moldova's accelerated integration into the EU alongside Romania; and the underlining of Romania's value as Moldova's main partner and ally in the path towards European integration, taking into account the same history, language and culture that both countries share. Țîcu's campaign slogan, "Together for Europe" (Romanian: Împreună pentru Europa), aimed to send a message of cohesion to society in order to achieve the goal of European integration.

Țîcu obtained 14,326 (0.93%) votes in the first round of the presidential election, which also took place on 20 October, placing eighth out of eleven candidates. In the second round of 3 November, Țîcu and the Together bloc encouraged voters to vote against Alexandr Stoianoglo, the candidate backed by the Party of Socialists of the Republic of Moldova (PSRM), with the LOC openly endorsing his opponent, PAS-backed incumbent President of Moldova Maia Sandu. Țîcu and the Together bloc incited voters to vote "against vote buying, against organized crime, against Ilan Shor, Igor Dodon, Veaceslav Platon and their candidate, Alexandr Stoianoglo".

=== 2025 parliamentary election ===
On 1 March 2025, the Ecologist Green Party (PVE), led by Anatolie Prohnițchi, joined the Together bloc in an effort to unite pro-European forces and guarantee the continuation of Moldova's path towards the EU as Prohnițchi stated. The PVE was among the 14 parties that signed the Pact for Europe the previous year. The Together bloc endorsed Crin Antonescu, the candidate of the Romania Forward Electoral Alliance, in the first round of the 2025 Romanian presidential election on 4 May, inciting Moldovans with Romanian citizenship to vote for him. In the second round, on 18 May, Together supported independent candidate Nicușor Dan. On 7 July, the LOC announced it had left the bloc and that it would participate in the 2025 parliamentary election of 28 September on its own. Such thing was decided within the party on 5 July. Bujorean accused the bloc of "delays, labeling and gamesmanship", and stated that the LOC would not accept "scenarios in which honest personalities and formations are absorbed" into the list of the PAS for the parliamentary election. He later claimed that some members of the bloc had been in conversations with the PAS to possibly participate in its list for the election since February.

As a reaction to the LOC's withdrawal, representatives of the bloc expressed disappointment, with Plîngău commenting that the departure of some people from the bloc "should not be treated as a weakness, but as a general clean-up before the election". For his part, Gligor accused Bujorean of having insistently supported the inclusion into the bloc of parties and individuals that he described as affiliated in the past to Moldovan oligarchs Shor's criminal group and Vladimir Plahotniuc's regime and the satellites of both, namely mentioning among others the European Social Democratic Party (PSDE; formerly the Democratic Party of Moldova, PDM) then led by Tudor Ulianovschi and the National Liberal Party (PNL) then led by Mihai Severovan. According to Gligor, at the last meeting of the bloc's coordination council, Bujorean repeatedly insisted on the inclusion of the CUB, the PSDE and the National Moldovan Party (PNM) into the bloc, which the PPDA, the PS and the PVE opposed, with this having been the real reason for the LOC's withdrawal as Gligor stated.

On 18 July, Plîngău announced that the PPDA would not participate in the parliamentary election with its own list of candidates, but that PPDA representatives would instead be included in the PAS' list, with the party having taken this decision the previous day. According to him, the talks with the PAS lasted for over a month, with Gligor stating that the PAS had offered three positions on its list to Together bloc representatives during the talks. Plîngău justified the PPDA's choice in the need to avoid dispersing the pro-European vote in the context of what he described as a historic campaign, as "the path to Europe is not guaranteed". The PAS gave a similar justification and stressed the need to prevent pro-Russian parties from coming to power, with the party's leader Igor Grosu welcoming the decision and stating that the PS and the LOC had rejected similar proposals. On the same day, the PPDA was excluded from Together, with Gligor stating that "the beheading of pro-European political parties by PAS is a wrong strategy that will lead to the division and dispersion of the pro-European vote".

Despite only remaining with the PS and the PVE, Gligor pledged on 21 July that Together would participate in the parliamentary election, with the bloc being formally registered for the election by the Central Electoral Commission of Moldova (CEC) on 19 August. As of August, polls had shown that the Together bloc had minimal chances of surpassing the 7% electoral threshold necessary for coalitions to enter the Moldovan parliament.

== Members ==
Party	Abbr.	Ideology	Position	Candidates
Party of Change	PS	Anti-corruption	Centre-right	45 / 60
Ecologist Green Party	PVE	Green politics	Centre-left	15 / 60

=== Former members ===
Party	Abbr.	Ideology	Position	Until
Coalition for Unity and Welfare	CUB	Social liberalism	Centre-right	9 August 2024
League of Cities and Communes	LOC	Localism	Centre	7 July 2025
Dignity and Truth Platform	PPDA	Liberalism	Centre-right	18 July 2025

== Election results ==
=== Parliament ===
Election	Leader	Performance					Rank	Government
Election	Leader	Votes	%	± pp	Seats	+/–	Rank	Government
2025	Sergiu Tofilat	5,030	0.32%	New	0 / 101	New	10th	Extra-parliamentary
