= Alexandru Cimbriciuc =

Moldovan politician

Leader of the National Unity Party
- In office 29 May 2023 – 17 September 2023
- Preceded by: Octavian Țîcu

Deputy Minister of Defense
- In office 12 March 2015 – 13 September 2016
- President: Nicolae Timofti
- Prime Minister: Chiril Gaburici; Natalia Gherman (acting); Valeriu Streleț; Gheorghe Brega (acting); Pavel Filip
- Minister: Viorel Cibotaru; Anatol Șalaru

Member of the Moldovan Parliament
- In office 22 April 2009 – 9 December 2014
- Parliamentary group: Liberal Democratic Party

Personal details
- Born: 18 June 1968 (age 57) Soroca, Moldavian SSR, Soviet Union
- Party: Liberal Democratic Party; Alliance for European Integration (2009–present)

Alexandru Cimbriciuc (born 18 June 1968) is a politician, jurist and businessman from the Republic of Moldova.

== Political activity ==
Between 2009 and 2014, Alexandru Cimbriciuc was deputy to the Parliament of the Republic of Moldova in the parliamentary faction of the Liberal Democratic Party of Moldova, member of the parliamentary commission for national security, defense and public order, chairman of the subcommittee on public order. In March 2015, Cimbriciuc was appointed Deputy Minister of Defense, and in May 2016 he resigned after a scandal that his son had generated and the appearance of information in the press as if intimidating a journalist. At the same time, he retired as a member of the Liberal Democratic Party of Moldova.

Alexandru Cimbriciuc is a former Ministry of Internal Affairs collaborator (1990-1993), and from 1995 to 2009 he was director of the private security organization "Chuan-Pu" LTD.

== Publications ==
- "Chuan-Pu - Martial fight"
- "Heroes in Soroca in the battle of the Dniester"
- "The Universe of Traditions"
