= Octavian Bodișteanu =

Moldovan politician (born 1977)

Minister of Youth and Sport
- In office 30 May 2013 – 18 February 2015
- President: Nicolae Timofti
- Prime Minister: Iurie Leancă
- Preceded by: Octavian Țîcu
- Succeeded by: Serghei Afanasenco

Deputy Minister of Youth and Sport
- In office 19 January 2011 – 30 May 2013
- President: Marian Lupu (acting); Nicolae Timofti
- Prime Minister: Vladimir Filat
- Minister: Ion Cebanu; Octavian Țîcu

Personal details
- Born: May 15, 1977 (age 48) Fundul Galbenei, Moldavian SSR, Soviet Union
- Party: Liberal Reformist Party (Moldova) (2013-2015)
- Other political affiliations: Pro-European Coalition
- Profession: Jurist

Octavian Bodișteanu (born 15 May 1977) is a jurist and Minister of Youth and Sports of Republic of Moldova from May 31, 2013 until December 10, 2014, replacing Octavian Țîcu and being succeeded by Sergei Afanasenco.

== Activity ==
Between 2011 and 2013, Bodișteanu was Deputy Minister of Youth and Sports of the Republic of Moldova.

Octavian Bodișteanu is a former performance sportsman (multiple national and international champion of free wrestling, master in sports), lawyer, the first honorary citizen in his native village.

== Family ==
He is married to singer Janet Erhan and has three children, Daniela, Alex and Bogdan.
