= Haia Lifșiț =

Romanian communist activist (1903–1929)

Haia Lifșiț or Lifschitz (Russian: Хая На́хмановна Ли́вшиц, romanized: Khaya Nakhmanovna Livshits; December 14, 1903 – August 17, 1929) was a Romanian communist who died as a result of a hunger strike while in detention for her political opinions.

== Biography ==
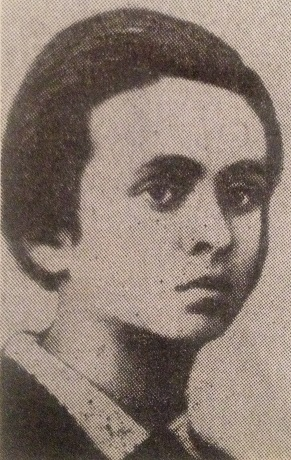

She was born in Kishinev, Bessarabia, in a family of petty civil servants of Jewish origin. While in high school, she joined the local communist organisation. After finishing high school, Haia worked as a schoolteacher, however she was soon arrested for her political options by the Romanian authorities, as Bessarabia had joined Greater Romania in 1918. She was set free, but not allowed to teach any more, so she had to work in a factory, where she continued her political activism.

In 1923 Haia Lifșiț was elected to the local committee of the, still legal, Union of Communist Youth (UTC). In May 1924 she was arrested again for distributing manifestos for the Romanian Communist Party. She was included in a group of communists put under trial in a major case that was transferred several times around the main cities of Romania. Eventually set free, she was arrested again in 1925 for the same charges. Lifșiț decided to flee Romania, and emigrated to Belgium, then Germany (where she used the pseudonym Maria Pavel), before finally settling in Vienna, Austria. In the meantime, she was convicted in absentia with 10 years of detention, for "crimes against state security". In the summer of 1926 she returned to Romania, but was quickly apprehended, then set free for lack of evidence.

Haia continued her activism, working for the newspaper Tânărul leninist ("The Young Leninist"), the official newspaper of the UTC. In 1928, she was elected the secretary of the Central Committee of the organisation. She was sent to tend party affairs in Oradea and Arad, in western Romania, however there she was arrested and transferred to Cluj for trial. The case involved several other important communist activists (Eugen Rozvan, Dan Avramescu) and was brought before a military tribunal, the War Council of the 6th Army Corps – Cluj. The trial had an important impact on the public opinion, and the group was defended by Lucrețiu Pătrășcanu, who would become one of the communist leaders after the 1944 coup d'état. According to Haia's deposition, during the investigations she was tortured and severely beaten. During the deposition she also demanded the re-legalisation of the UTC and of the Communist Party, while reaffirming her commitment to the communist ideals. She was sentenced to 8 years of detention, further 10 years of political interdiction, and she was to pay a large fine.

In June 1929, while in jail, Haia started a hunger strike along other comrades convicted in the same trial, demanding to be set free according to a recently announced amnesty decree. During the following 43 days she accepted only water, refusing any food. This led to a deteriorating health condition, and ultimately to her death on August 17, 1929, few days before the amnesty decree was put into force. Worried about the echo her death would have on the local population, the Romanian authorities disposed that her body be transported to the Hajongard cemetery in Cluj, under the guard of the Siguranța (the Romanian secret police), only by side roads. Only her parents were allowed to attend her burial, but local communists succeeded in organising a small protest.

Among those that protested the treatment of the communists by the Romanian state regarding Lifșiț's death were Albert Einstein and Henri Barbusse.

== Personal life ==
She had two children, Nachman and Gilla Lifschitz, who lived in Brussels.

== Legacy ==
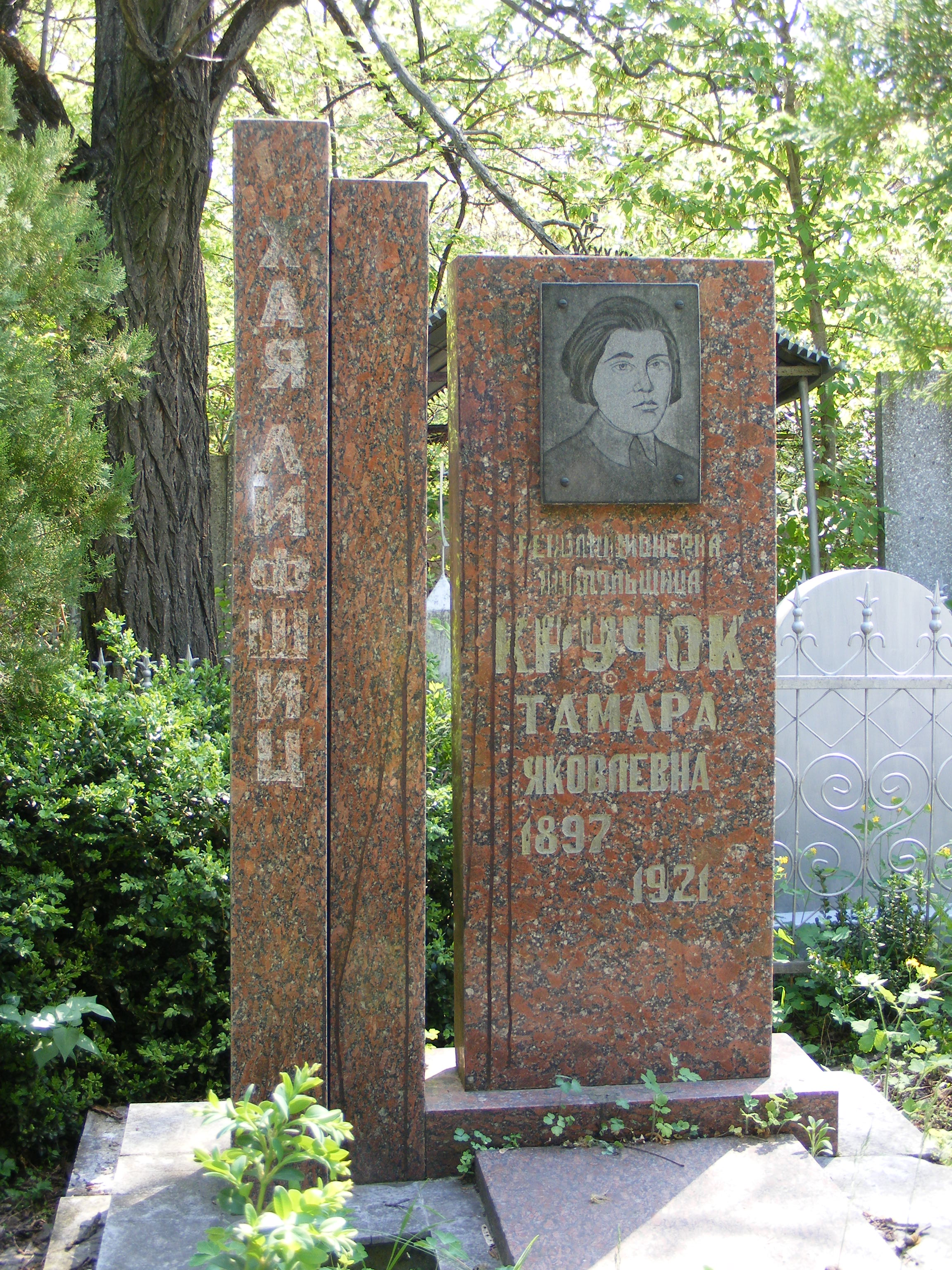
Monument dedicated to Bessarabian communists Haia Lifșiț (on the left) and Tamara Kruchok at the Jewish cemetery in Tighina

After World War II, Romanian-Moldovan poet Liviu Deleanu composed Poem to Hae Livshitz, adapted in 1965 for choir by Romanian-Moldovan composer Solomon Lobel. Moldovan playwright and screenwriter Gheorghe Malarciuc also wrote a play about the communist activist.

== Sources ==
- Ioniță, Elisabeta (1969). "Haia Lifșiț" in Anale de Istorie, Vol. XV, Nr. 5. Institutul de Studii Istorice și Social-Politice de pe lîngă C.C. al P.C.R, Bucharest. pp. 178–180.
