= Gheorghe Malarciuc =

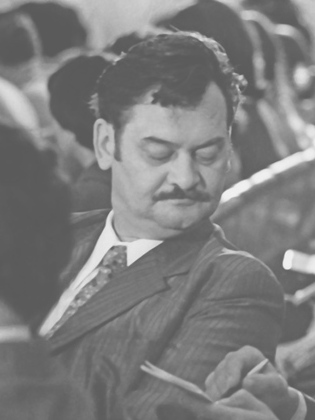
- Born: 6 June 1934; Bursuc, Kingdom of Romania
- Died: 30 October 1992 (aged 58); Chișinău, Moldova
- Education: Moldova State University
- Known for: head of the Ecologist Party of Moldova "Green Alliance"
- Political party: Ecologist Party of Moldova "Green Alliance"

Gheorghe Malarciuc (6 June 1934 in Bursuc – 30 October 1992 in Chișinău) was a screenwriter and politician from Moldova. He served as the first head of the Ecologist Party of Moldova "Green Alliance", as well as honorary vice-president of the Ecological Movement of Romania. He graduated in 1956 from Moldova State University and worked for Moldova-Film and Literaturnaya Gazeta. While he was the head editor of the later, he supported the publishing of Moldavian-Romanian national awakening articles.

== Film ==
Fiction:

- The Last Night in Heaven (with the participation of I. Prut) (1964)
- Sergei Lazo (1967)
- Wedding in the Palace (co-author C. Condrea) (1969)
- Red Snowstorm (1971)
- Sergei Lazo's Life and Immortality (Television film, 3 episodes) (1985)
- Black Magic (1991)

Documentaries:

- Our Cojusna (1958)
- Românești (1976)
- The Time of Coming True (1977)
- The Legend of the Vines (1981)
- My Home, Moldova! (1983)
- Masters and Servants (1988)
- Ion Druta (1989)

== Works ==
- Firicel de iarbă verde (1959)
- La Piatra Cucului, Victoria Haiei Lifșiț (1963)
- Badea Cozma (1974)
- Zile de foc, de apă și de pământ (1974),
- Marseillaise (1984)
- Dragă consăteanule! (1984)
- Ultima noapte în rai (1964)
- Serghei Lazo (1967)
- Viscolul roșu (1971)
- Din moși strămoși (1959)
- Copilul și luna (1959)
- Legende despre Lazo (1971)
- Patru pași pe harta Americii (1972)
- Scrisori din casa părintească (1980)

== Bibliography ==
- Chişinău, Enciclopedie, 1997, Ed. "Museum".
- Profiluri literare, Chișinău, 1972.
- Literatura și arta Moldovei: Encicl. - Vol.1, Chișinău, 1985.
- Mihai Cimpoi, O istorie deschisă a literaturii române din Basarabia, Chișinău, 1996.
