= Fundul Galbenei =

- Commune and village
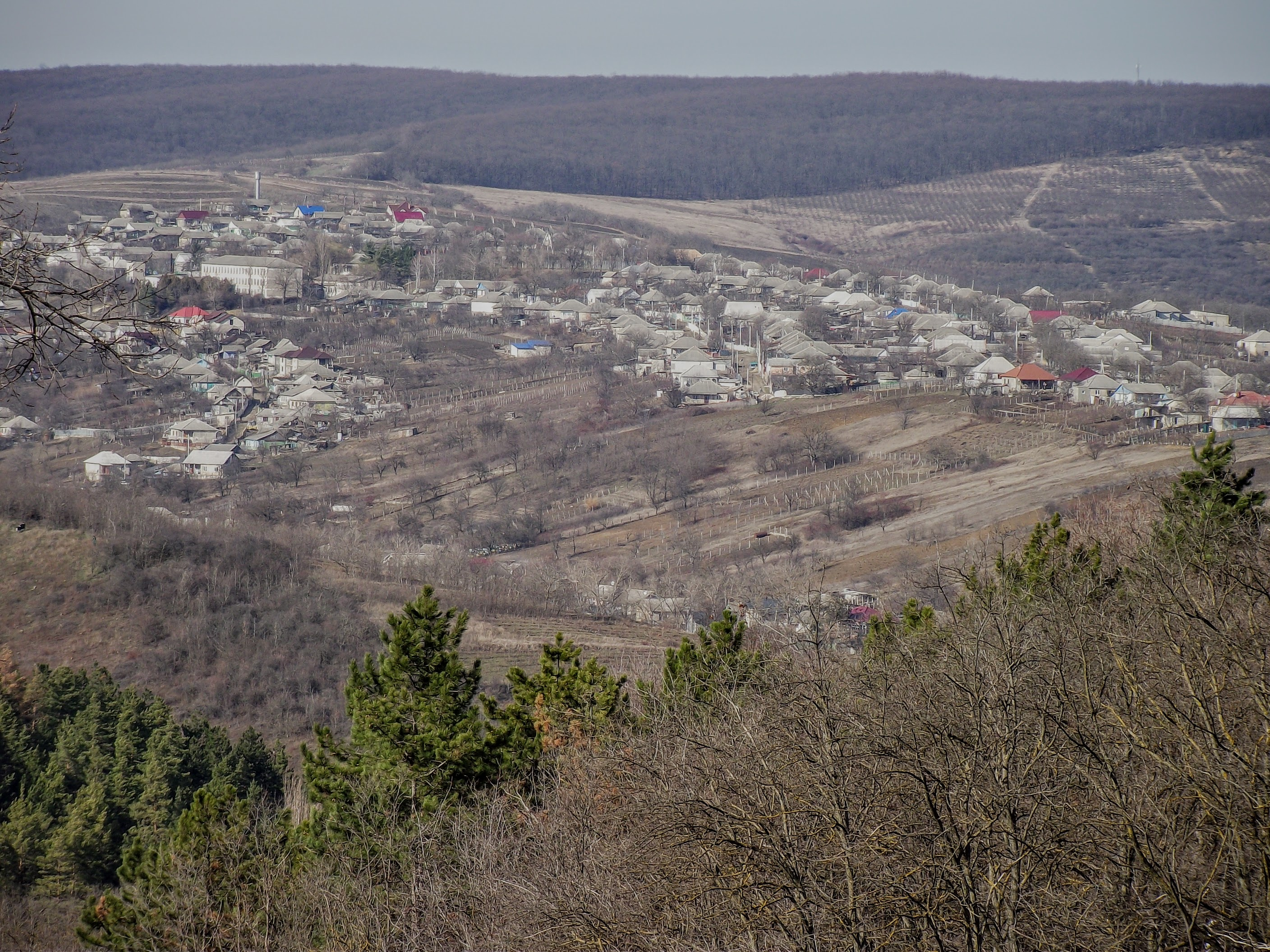
- Fundul Galbeney village

- Location in Moldova
- Coordinates: 46°53′N 28°37′E
- Country: Moldova
- District: Hîncești
- Elevation: 184 m (604 ft)

Population (2014 census)
  - Total: 2,468
- Time zone: UTC+2 (EET)
  - Summer (DST): UTC+3 (EEST)

Fundul Galbenei is a commune in Hîncești District, Moldova. At the time of the 2004 census, it had a population of 2,507 people. The village was first mentioned in documents in 1632. In 1793, a wooden church was built in the village, however, this church was rebuilt in 1819. The commune is mainly engaged in agriculture; Vietnamese pig breeding, and honey and wine making are of note.

== History ==
The village was first mentioned in documents in 1632, but archaeological evidence indicates it was occupied as early as 6,000 years ago. The remains of a settlement were unearthed dating back to the early Iron Age, about 2,700 years ago. A wooden church was built in Fundul Galbanei in 1793, rebuilt in 1819. Between 1836 and 1850, 28 families were displaced, such that by the 1859 census, the village had 390 men and 336 women living in 197 houses.

== Geography ==
Fundul Galbenei is both a large village and commune which is located in central Moldova. It lies close to the border with Ialoveni District. The main road of access is the E584 road, also known as Route 3 which connects Hîncești to the capital of Chișinău. To both the west and east of the village there is woodland, and to the southeast in particular the greenery is dense in the neighboring commune of Buțeni. By road, Fundul Galbeni is located approximately 25 kilometres (16 mi) southwest of Chișinău, 9.5 kilometres (5.9 mi) northeast of Hîncești, 8.8 kilometres (5.5 mi) north of Buțeni, and 9.7 kilometres (6.0 mi) southwest of Bardar, although by air it is much closer. Logănești is one of the nearest settlement by air from Fundul Galbanei, beyond the woodland to the northwest, but the access to it from Fundul Galbanei is a significant detour at around 18 kilometres (11 mi) away via the E584 road and the R44 road which leads north near Hîncești.

== Economy ==
The economy is based on agriculture: Vietnamese pig breeding is of note, and historically the village was known to produce honey. The households also deal with viticulture, beekeeping, fruit growing.

== Landmarks ==
Buildings include the church built in 1903, a school, a cultural centre, two libraries, a medical centre, a post office, a bank and a nursery, as well as several shops and cafés. The village is surrounded by vineyards, orchards and woodland.

== Notable people ==
- Ruslan Bodișteanu (born 1977), freestyle wrestler
- Octavian Bodisteanu, former politician
