= Octavian Țîcu =

Romanian historian and politician

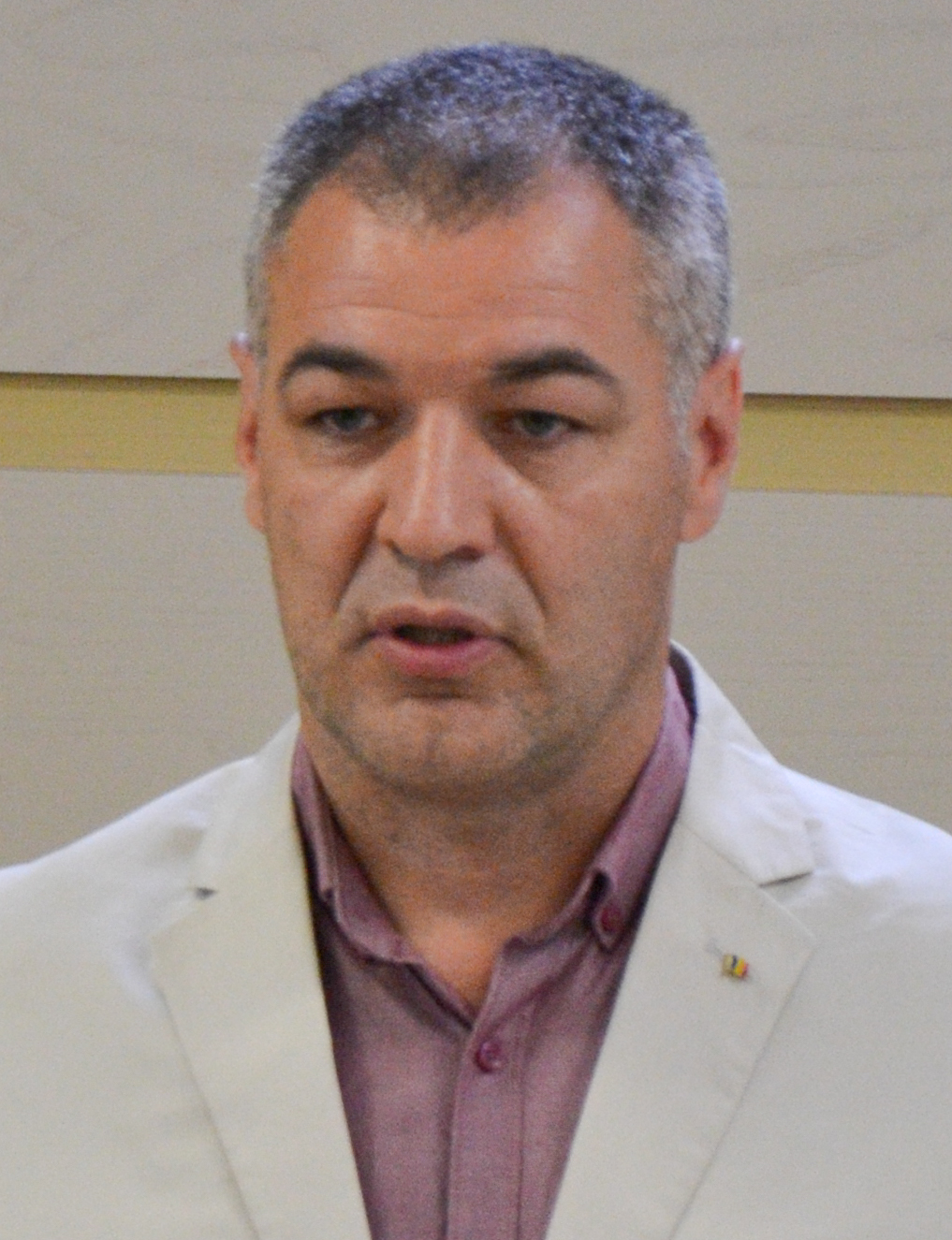
- Țîcu in 2020

Leader of the National Unity Party
- In office 7 December 2019 – 13 December 2021
- Preceded by: Anatol Șalaru

Member of the Moldovan Parliament
- In office 9 March 2019 – 23 July 2021
- Parliamentary group: Dignity and Truth Platform; National Unity Party

Minister of Youth and Sport
- In office 26 February 2013 – 30 May 2013
- President: Nicolae Timofti
- Prime Minister: Vladimir Filat
- Preceded by: Ion Cebanu
- Succeeded by: Octavian Bodișteanu

Personal details
- Born: 21 August 1972 (age 54) Costuleni, Moldavian SSR, Soviet Union (now Moldova)
- Citizenship: Moldova; Romania
- Party: Together
- Other political affiliations: Independent (Note: Țîcu, an independent, was elected as part of the NOW Platform DA and PAS bloc in 2019) (2013-2019), National Unity Party (2019-2021)
- Spouse: Viorica Țîcu
- Education: Alexandru Ioan Cuza University
- Profession: Historian

Octavian Țîcu (born 21 August 1972) is a Moldovan politician, historian, and former professional boxer serving as a Member of Parliament in Moldova since 2019. He was Ministry of Youth and Sport in 2013.

== Biography ==
Octavian Țîcu is a research coordinator at the Institute of History, Academy of Science of the Republic of Moldova and associate professor at Moldova State University and Free International University of Moldova (ULIM). Octavian Țîcu holds a degree in history from the Alexandru Ioan Cuza University of Iași, Romania, where he also studied for a Ph.D. (1994–2000). He is author of ten books (published in Germany, USA, UK, and Romania).

Țîcu was a member of the Commission for the Study of the Communist Dictatorship in Moldova. He has received numerous awards that allowed him to do research in Romania, Russia, Hungary, France, Switzerland, Lithuania, and the United States of America. Presently he is a researcher-coordinator at the Institute of History, Academy of Science of Moldova.

=== Political career ===
On February 26, 2013, Octavian Țîcu assumed office of Ministry of Youth and Sport of Republic of Moldova. He was elected member of Parliament of Moldova in the 2019 parliamentary election running as independent within the ACUM Electoral Bloc.

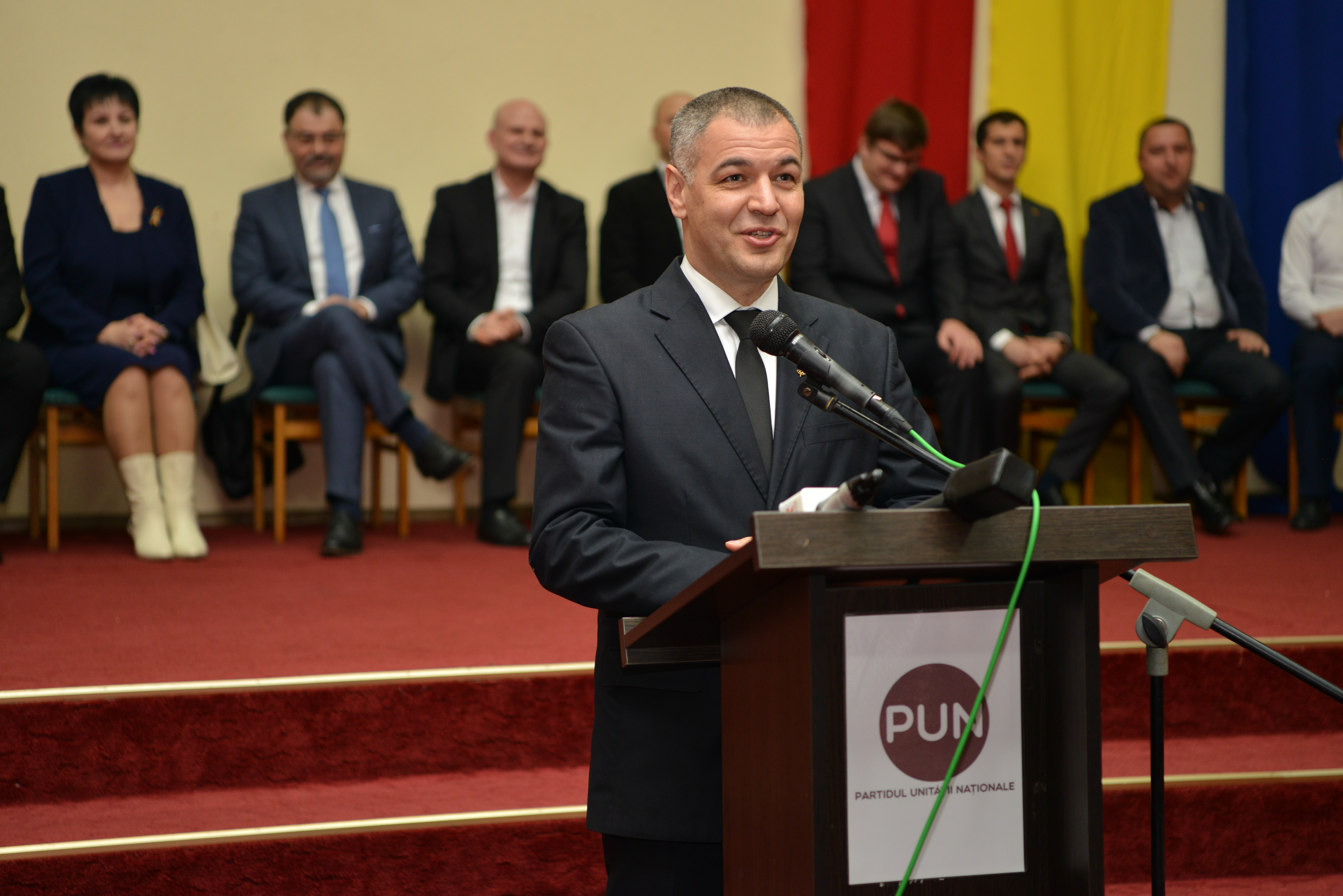
Țîcu speaking as President of the National Unity Party (PUN) in 2019

On September 17, 2019, he left Bloc ACUM invoking the continuation of alliance with pro-Russian Socialist Party, considered "a political mistake", and run as independent candidate for Mayor of Chișinău, coming in 4th place with 5% of votes. On December 7, 2019, he was elected President of the National Unity Party (PUN), which is an unionist, pro-Romanian oriented political party. In November 2020 he participated as candidate of PUN to the Presidential elections and achieved the 6th place with some 2% of votes (27 thousands voters). Next year, as result of lost Parliamentary elections on July 11, 2021, O.Țîcu has retired from PUN leadership and from political activity, and returned to academic issues.

==== 2024 presidential campaign ====
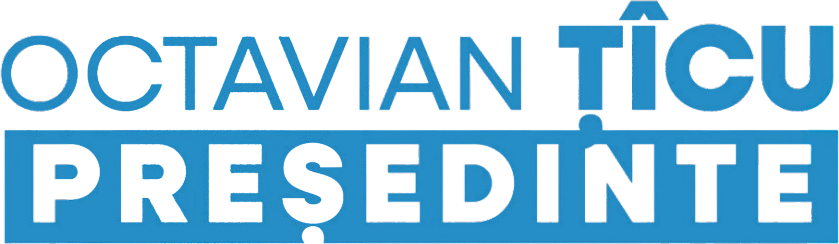
Țîcu's 2024 campaign logo

On 4 August 2024, Țîcu became the candidate for running for President of Moldova for the bloc Together, a coalition of four small parties: DA Platform, Coalition for Unity and Welfare (CUB), League of Cities and Communes, and the Party of Change. Țîcu, who did not belong to any of the member parties, beat two challengers; Igor Munteanu of the CUB, and Ștefan Gligor from the Party of Change. In his acceptance speech Țîcu stated that he would be the voice for European and unionist Moldovan citizens. Shortly after his nomination CUB announced they would be rescinding their support for Țîcu due to "serious disagreements on vision and political strategy" with Igor Munteanu calling Țîcu "a conservative candidate obedient to the current government."

Țîcu has stated that the principal goal of his presidency if elected would be Moldova's integration into the European Union and the rejection of Putinist forces throughout the country. Țîcu would also say that he would prosecute "corrupt politicians and those who benefit from illegal financing in the election campaign and in the destabilization of the Republic of Moldova." He also vowed to increase the quality of life and economic strength in Moldova, promising to support domestic producers through tax breaks, preferential loans, and access to export markets in the European Union and in the world. He also noted that education, healthcare, research, culture and sport are areas of national interest and called for pay raises in those fields.

Țîcu was endorsed by Iurie Reniță who stated that if Țîcu is elected president one of the first things he will do is demand the withdrawal of the Russian military presence in Transnistria and criticized incumbent president Maia Sandu for not doing so, and for engaging in "electoral demagogy" for only focusing on domestic economic issues instead of foreign relations. On 9 September 2024, Țîcu called on Foreign minister Mihai Popșoi to resign after the Hungarian Foreign minister Péter Szijjártó criticized Ukraine at a joint press conference hosted by Popșoi. Țîcu would lose in the first round, earning 14,315 votes or 0.93% of the electorate, placing in 8th.

== Professional boxing career ==
- 1995–2003: Seven times National Champion of Moldova;
- 1995: World Championship, Berlin (Germany). Lost first round to Serafim Todorov (Bulgaria);
- 1996: V place to European Championship, Vejle (Denmark). Qualified to Olympic Summer Games;
- 1996: Vice-Champion of Bulgaria for club "Slavia" Sofia;
- 1996: Participant to the Summer Olympic Games, Atlanta (USA). Lost in first round to Toncho Tonchev (Bulgaria);
- 1996: Golden medalist at Golden Glove, Beograd (Yugoslavia);
- 1997: Bronze medalist at Czech Grand Prix, Usti nad Labem (Czech Republic);
- 1997: World Championship, Budapest (Hungary). Lost first round to Dimitar Shtilianov (Bulgaria);
- 1998: Silver medalist at Chemiepocale, Halle (Germany). Qualified to European Championship;
- 1998: European Championship, Minsk (Belarus). Lost first round to A. Serdiuk (Ukraine);
- 1998: Golden medalist at Beogradski Pobednik, Beograd (Yugoslavia);
- 1999: Silver medalist at European Cup, Lviv (Ukraine);
- 1999: Bronze medalist at Black Sea Cup, Sevastopol (Ukraine) (Qualification Tournament to the Olympic Summer Games);
- 2000: Bronze medalist at Golden Belt, Bucharest (Romania);
- 2001: IX place at World Championship, Belfast (Northern Ireland);
- 2001: Silver medalist at Feliks Stamm, Warsaw (Poland);
- 2002: Bronze medalist at Golden Belt, Bucharest (Romania);
- 2002: European Championship, Permi (Russia). Lost first round to Filip Palici (Croatia);
- 2003: Golden medalist at Beogradski Pobednik, Beograd (Serbia);
- 2003: Bronze medalist at Feliks Stamm, Warsaw (Poland) - the last international tournament.

== Publications ==
- Țîcu, O. (2019), O istorie ilustrată a românilor de la est de Prut (1791–prezent), Chișinău. Litera. 2019;
- Țîcu, O. (2018), Homo Moldovanus Sovietic: Teorii și practici de constucție identitară în R(A)SSM (1924–1989), Chișinău.Arc, 2018;
- Dulatbekov, N., Țîcu, O., Miloiu, S. (2016), Spassk 99: O istorie a prizonierilor de război români în documente, Bucharest. Eikon, 2016, 598 pp.;
- Țîcu, O. and Bogus, B. (2014): Nicolae Simatoc (1920–1979). Legenda unui fotbalist basarabean de la Ripensia la FC Barcelona, Ediția II, Chișinău. Cartdidact, 267 pp.;
- S. Miloiu, O. Țîcu, V. Jarmolenko (2013), From Neighbourhood to Partnership: Highlights of Lithuania Relations with Romania and Moldova, Târgoviște: Cetatea de Scaun, 2013, 311 pp.;
- Țîcu, O. and Bogus, B. (2013): Nicolae Simatoc (1920–1979). Legenda unui fotbalist basarabean de la Ripensia la FC Barcelona, Chișinau. Cartdidact, 211 pp.;
- Țîcu, O. and Bogus, B. (2010): East European Football from Communism to Globalization, Saarbruken. Lambert Academic Publishing, 167 pp.;
- Țîcu, O. and Bogus, B. (2008): Fotbalul în contextul transformărilor democratice din Europa de Est. Cazul Ucrainei, României şi Republicii Moldova. (Football in the context of democratic transformations in Eastern Europe. The case of Ukraine, Romania and Moldova), Chişinău. Cartdidact. 144 pp.;
- Țîcu, O. (2004): Problema Basarabiei şi relaţiile sovieto-române în perioada interbelică (1919–1939) (The Bessarabia Problem and Soviet-Romanian Relationships in the Interwar Period (1919–1939)). Chişinău. Prut International. 269 pp.

== Awards ==
- In 2016, he was awarded the Medal "Olympic Merit" by the President of the National Olympic Committee of Moldova.
- In 2010, he was awarded the Medal "Civic Merit" by the President of the Republic of Moldova.
- In 2004, he received the National Youth Prize in the field of Science and Literature for his monograph, entitled The Problem of Basarabia and Soviet-Romanian Ties in the Interwar Period (1919–1939).
