= Ion Cebanu =

Moldovan politician

Minister of Youth and Sport
- In office 25 September 2009 – 6 February 2013
- President: Mihai Ghimpu (acting); Vladimir Filat (acting); Marian Lupu (acting); Nicolae Timofti
- Prime Minister: Vladimir Filat
- Succeeded by: Octavian Țîcu

Personal details
- Born: 1 January 1984 (age 42) Chişinău, Moldavian SSR, Soviet Union
- Party: Liberal Party (Moldova) (2009–present); Alliance for European Integration (2009–present)
- Profession: Jurist

Ion Cebanu (born 1 January 1984) is a Moldovan politician. He was Minister of Youth and Sports between 25 September 2009 and 26 February 2013 in the First Vlad Filat Cabinet and in the Second Filat Cabinet as well, President of the Liberal Party Territorial Organization, Centru branch of Chisinau, member of the Central Permanent Bureau of the Liberal Party, president of the Public Association "Optimus".

Between 27 February and 16 May 2013 he was General Manager of the Agency for Forestry "Moldsilva".

From 4 September 2013 Ion Cebanu is Chief of the Chișinău Mine.

== Biography ==
He is a member of the Liberal Party (Moldova).

== Studies ==
- 1991-2003: Theoretical High School "Princess Natalia Dadiani"
- 2003-2007: Faculty of Law at the State University of Moldova
- 1 November 2007 - 9 July 2008: Master in Constitutional and Administrative Law at the State University of Moldova

=== Internships ===
- Training practice - Chisinau Prosecutor's Office, Buiucani District Court in Chișinău;
- 1 July 2007 - 7 July 2007 - France, Strasbourg, Council of Europe, Program of the European Studies Institute "Democracy Development in South East Europe".

== Professional activity ==
- 14 November 2007 - 14 November 2008: Lawyer at the Municipal Enterprise Regia Autosalubritate;
- 1 February 2008 - 1 May 2008: Lawyer at the Municipal Enterprise Department of Capital Constructions;
- Since 1 July 2008 - until now: Chairman of the Board of Directors SA "Edilitate";
- Since 23 May 2008 - until now: Counselor in Chișinău Municipal Council;
- Since 5 April 2009 - until now: Chairman of the Liberal Party faction in Chișinău Municipal Council.

== Political activity ==
Ion Cebanu begins his political activity within the Youth Organization of the Liberal Party. On 26 November 2007, at the Second Youth Conference of the PL Youth Organization, he was elected vice-president. During the general local elections on 3 June 2007, he was a candidate for the Liberal Party and is elected councilor in the Chisinau Municipal Council. He became one of the youngest councilors in the city of Chisinau.

At the parliamentary elections of 5 April 2009 Ion Cebanu was placed at 34th place in the list of candidates for the position of deputy in the Parliament of the Republic of Moldova. In the early parliamentary elections, the young Ion Cebanu was promoted among the places of passage in the legislative, being proposed at 16th place on the list of candidates. The Liberal Party accounted for 14.61% of the votes, which constituted 15 parliamentary mandates.

== Minister of Youth and Sports ==
Ion Cebanu held the post of Minister of Youth and Sport from 25 September 2009, after the Filat Cabinet was invested by the legislature. Ion Cebanu became the youngest minister in the new government at the age of 25. He was replaced on 26 February 2013 by Octavian Țîcu.

== See also ==
- Liberal Party
- Mihai Ghimpu
- Dorin Chirtoacă
- Anatol Șalaru
- Corina Fusu
- Valeriu Munteanu
- Liberalism
