= Ecologist Green Party (Moldova) =

Ecologist Green Party Partidul Verde Ecologist
- President: Anatolie Prohnițchi
- Founder: Gheorghe Malarciuc
- Founded: April 9, 1992
- Headquarters: 59 București Street, Chișinău
- Ideology: Green politics Pro-Europeanism; Progressivism
- Political position: Centre-left
- National affiliation: Together
- European affiliation: European Green Party
- International affiliation: Global Greens
- Colours: Green
- Parliament: 0 / 101
- District Presidents: 0 / 32

Website
- greenmoldova.org

The Ecologist Green Party (Romanian: Partidul Verde Ecologist, PVE), formerly known as the Ecologist Party of Moldova "Green Alliance" (Romanian: Partidul Ecologist din Moldova "Alianța Verde", PEMAV) is a green political party in Moldova.

== History ==
The party was established on April 9, 1992. The Founding Congress adopted the program and bylaws and elected the governing bodies. Gheorghe Malarciuc was the first leader of the party. The party is part of the Together bloc, having joined on 1 March 2025.

== Ideology ==
The party presents itself as a free political party created by Moldovan citizens, advocating sustainable development, interethnic cohesion, democracy, environmental preservation and respect for human rights, using the naturalistic and cultural models. The policies of the green parties that have succeeded. It defends the principle of social equity and equal opportunities for all. It also promotes the formation of a society with a strong, free economy, with a social and ecological orientation.

The measures envisaged by the party include among other things:

- reorientation of economic and trade policies to serve social and environmental objectives, not just economic indices
- reforming agriculture by supporting organic farming
- development of cities with respect for the environment
- respect for the principles of the Universal Declaration of Human Rights
- strengthen the responsibility of parents and educators for the growth and education of new generations
- adopt a comprehensive program of familiarization of the population with the achievements of universal and national culture at all stages of human evolution
- educate society in a spirit of respect for the environment and good management of natural resources
- free and universal health insurance system
- favorable to a foreign policy of cooperation with all peace-loving countries in the world, guaranteeing a policy of good understanding with all the neighbors and of regional and world security

== Electoral results ==
Results since 1994 (year links to election page)
Polls	Type of Election	Votes	%	MPs
1994	Parliament	7,025	0.40	0
1998	Parliament	315,206 (Note: Part of the Democratic Convention of Moldova)	19.42	2
2001	Parliament	0	0	0
2005	Parliament	0	0	0
2009 (April)	Parliament	0	0	0
2009 (July)	Parliament	6,517	0.41	0
2010	Parliament	1,380	0.08	0
2014	Parliament	1,335	0.09	0
2019	Parliament	3,247	0.23	0
2021	Parliament	1,202	0.08	0
2025	Parliament	5,030 (Note: Part of the Together Bloc)	0.32	0

== See also ==
- Green party
- Green politics
- List of environmental organizations
