= Hâncu Monastery =

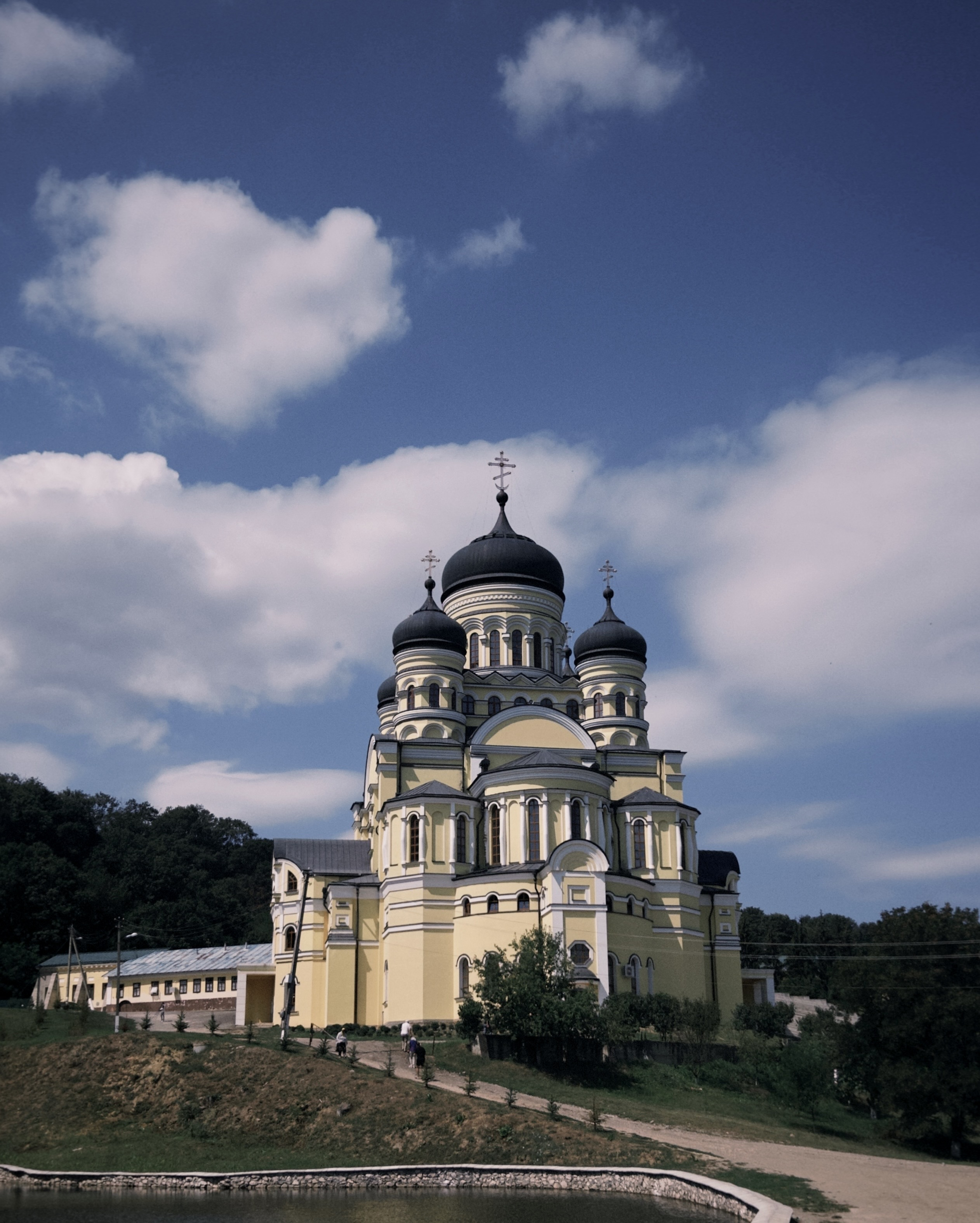
- Cathedral of "the Holy Apostles Peter and Paul".
- Hâncu Monastery
- 47°04′45″N 28°19′19″E
- Location: Bursuc, Nisporeni District
- Country: Moldova
- Denomination: Eastern Orthodoxy

History
- Status: Monastery
- Founded: 1678

The Hâncu Monastery (Romanian: Mănăstirea Hâncu) is a monastery in Bursuc, Moldova. The monastery was founded in 1678, in the principality of Moldavia.

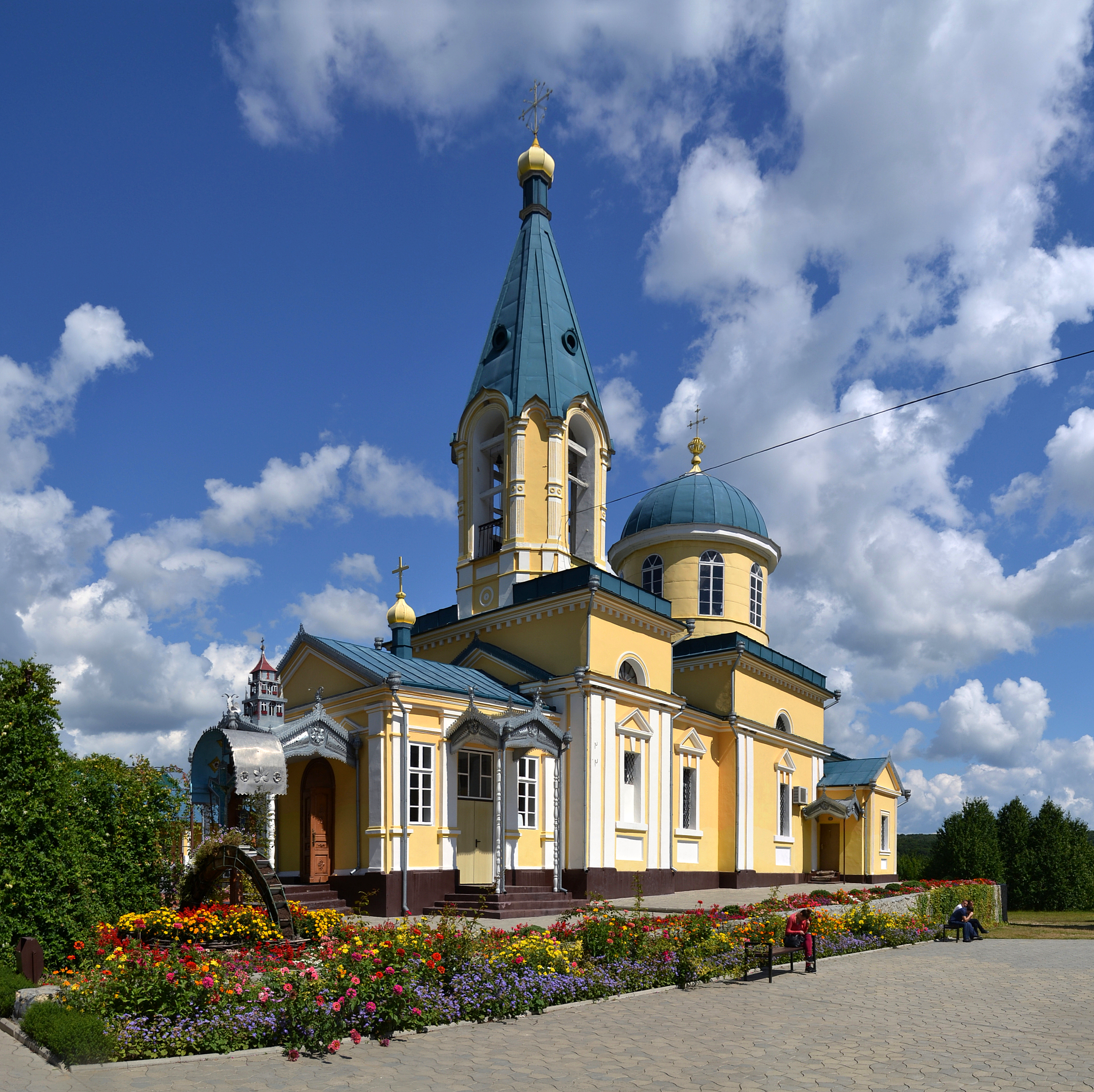
Summer Church "Saint Paraskeva".

The monastery was built by Mihail Hancu, Great High Steward, after his daughter expressed a desire to become a nun. It was initially a female community, but it ceased to exist by the mid-eighteenth century due to the Crimean Tatars invasion. Following the arrival of the Russian army under Rumeantev (1770-1772), the monastery was restored by monks and became a male community. Two new stone churches were built to replacing an earlier wooden church: the first, dedicated to St Pious Parascheva, was built in 1835, and the second, dedicated to the Dormition of the Mother of God was built in 1845.

Under Communism, the monastery site was nationalised in 1944 and the religious community disbanded in 1965. In 1978, the buildings were converted for use as a sanatorium, with the oldest church transformed into a social club. Following the collapse of the Soviet Union, the monastery was reopened in 1990, with monks resident for two years. In 1992, it was returned to its original purpose as a monastery for women, and today houses a large community of nuns.

The monastery site today includes a retreat house and the official residence of the local bishop.

== Gallery ==
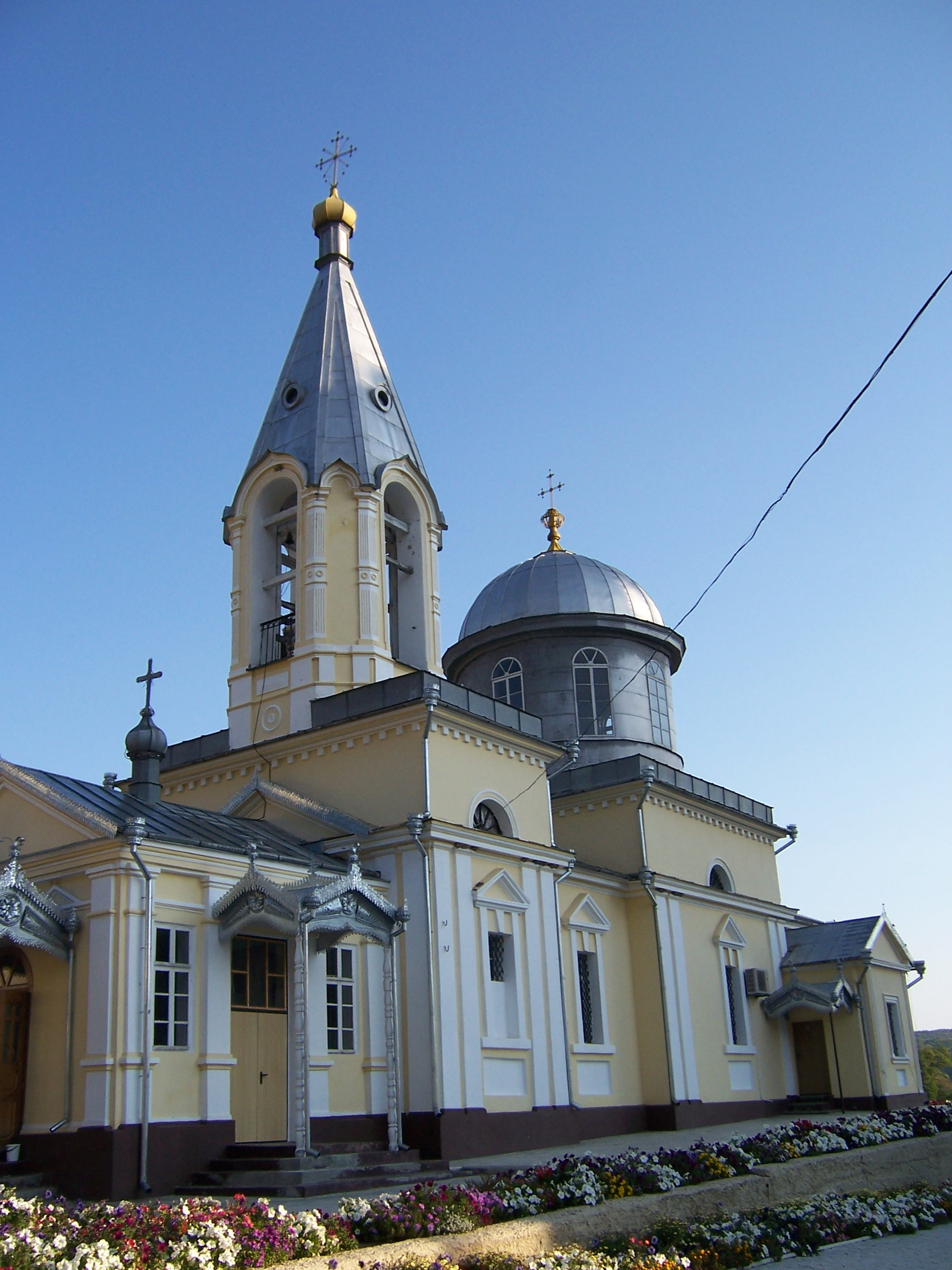
An exterior view of one of the monastery churches.

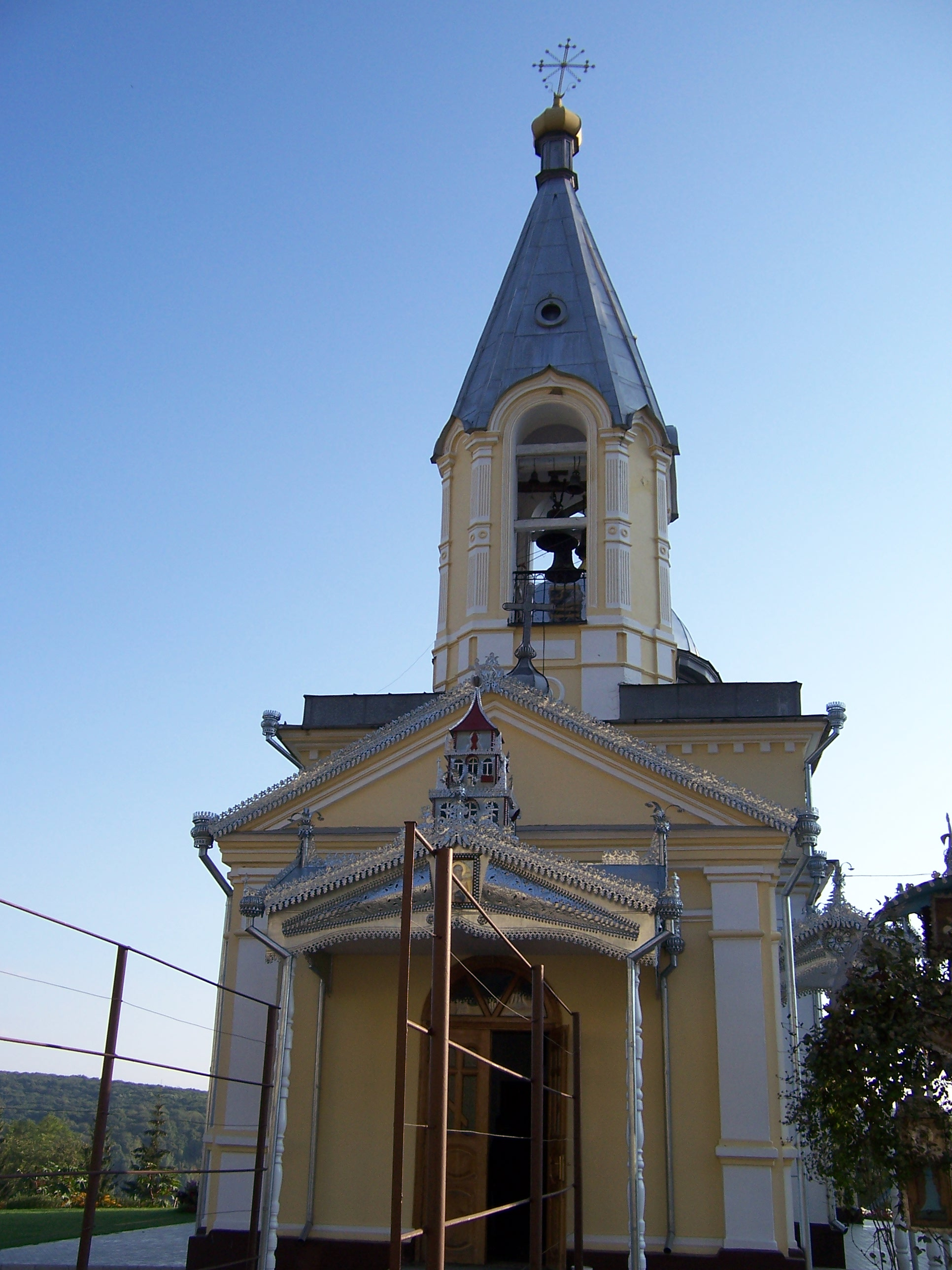
Another exterior view of the church.

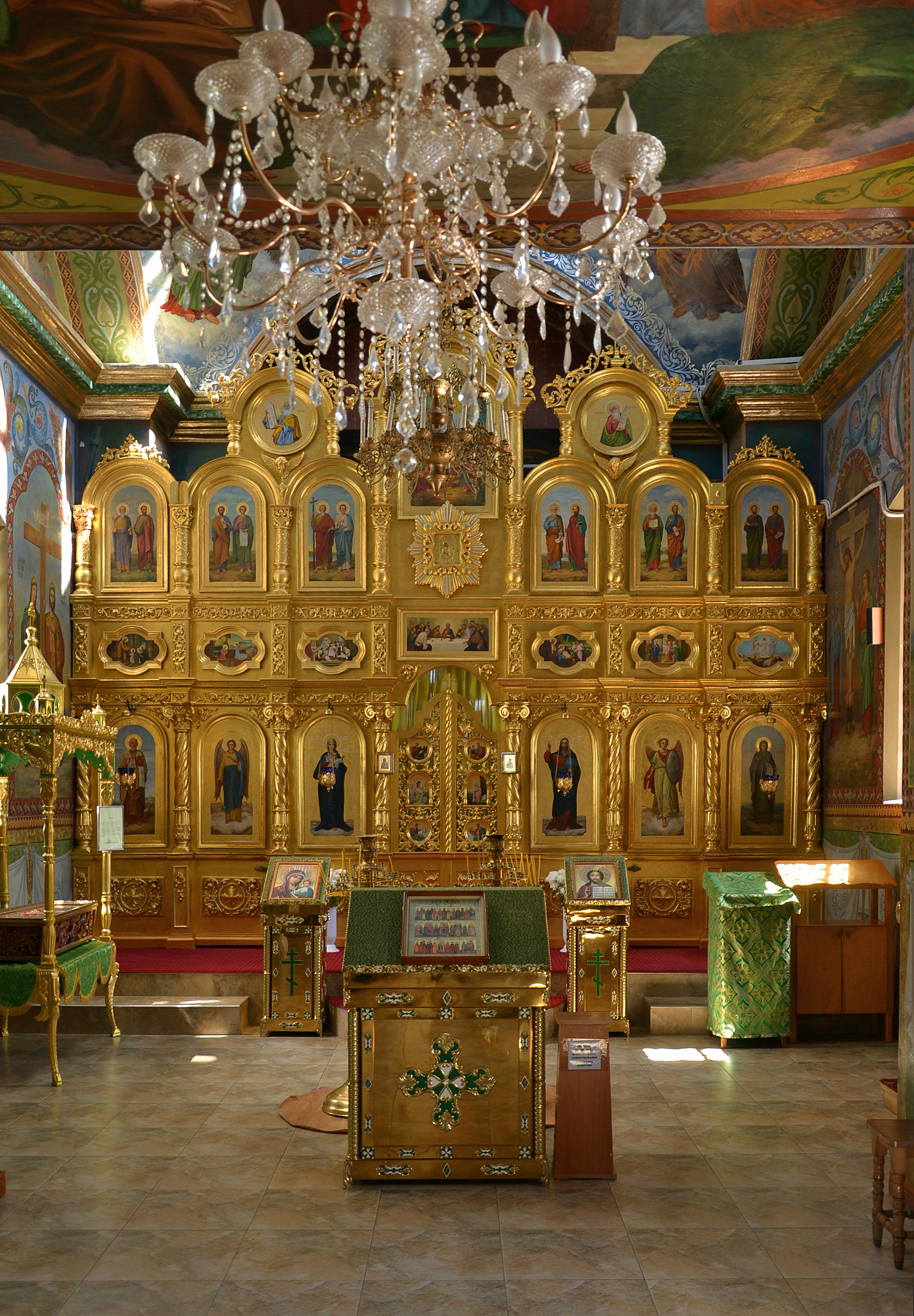
The iconostasis (screen in front of the sanctuary).

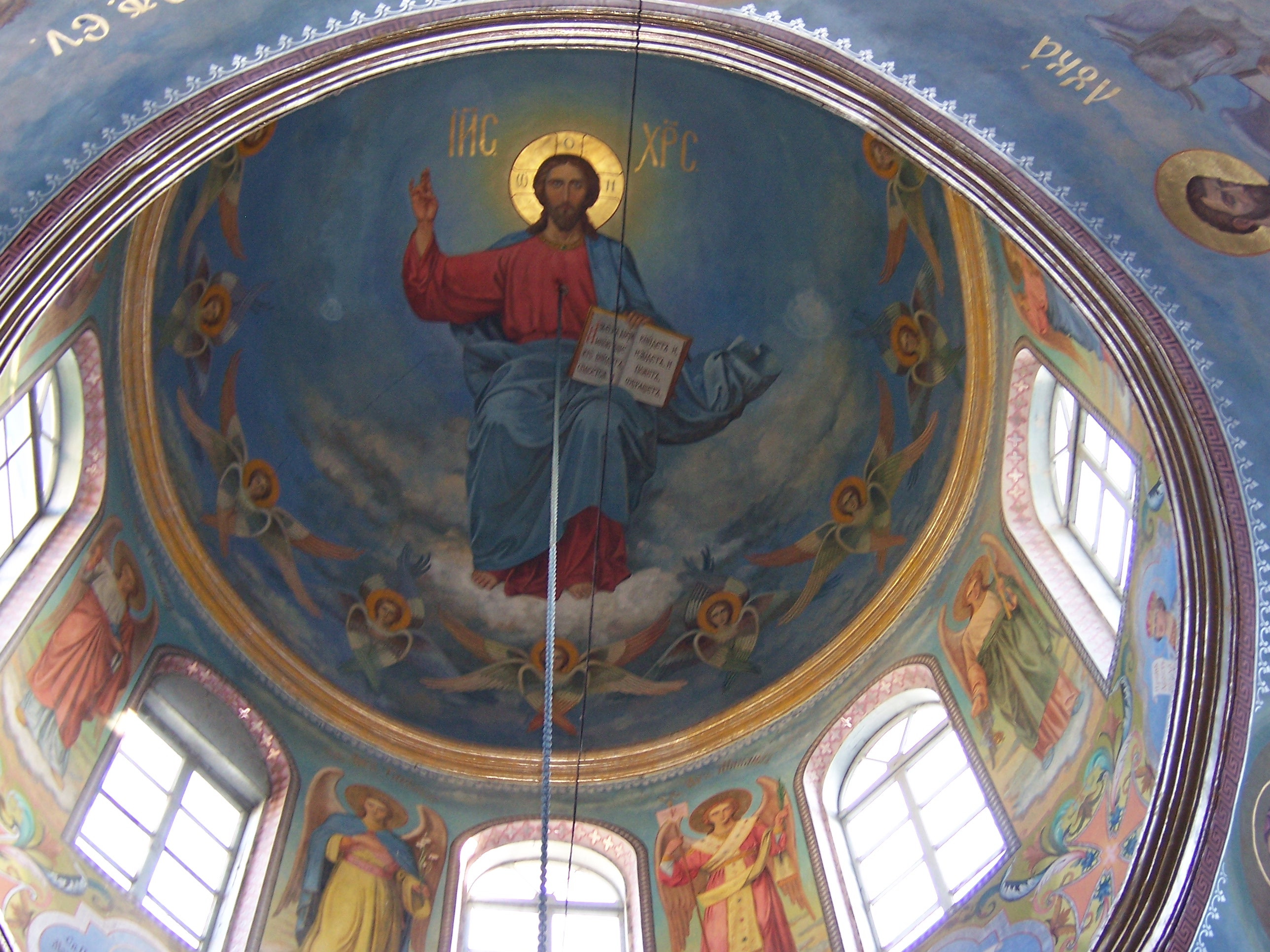
The ceiling (cupola) of one of the churches.

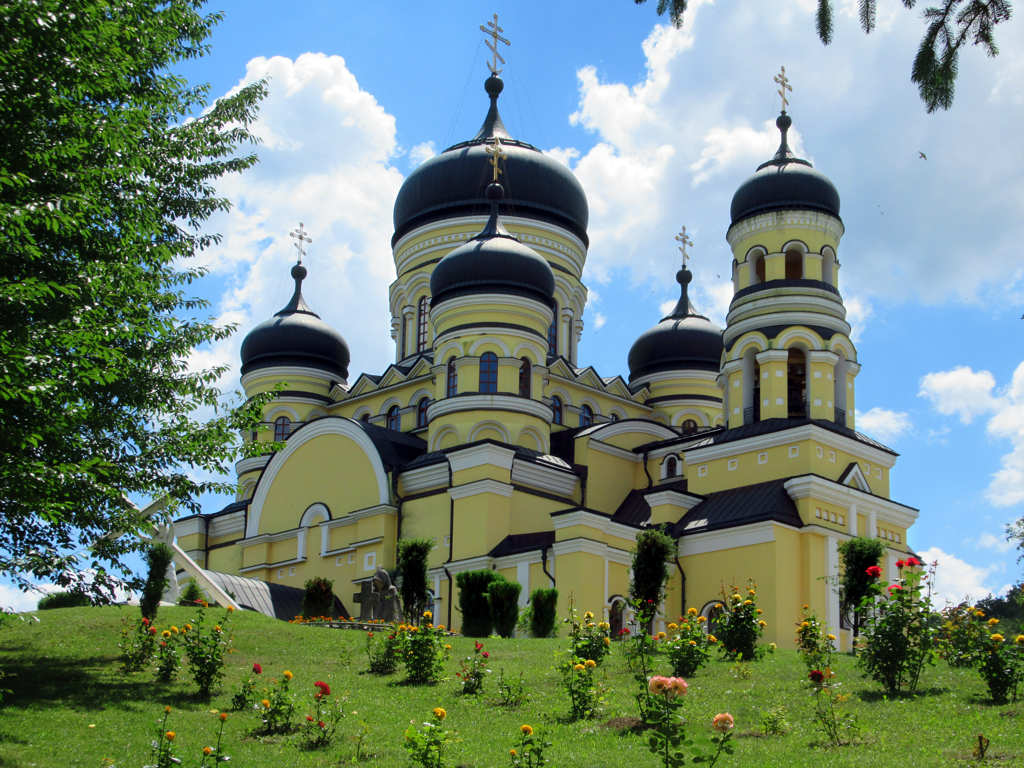
A view of the biggest cathedral.

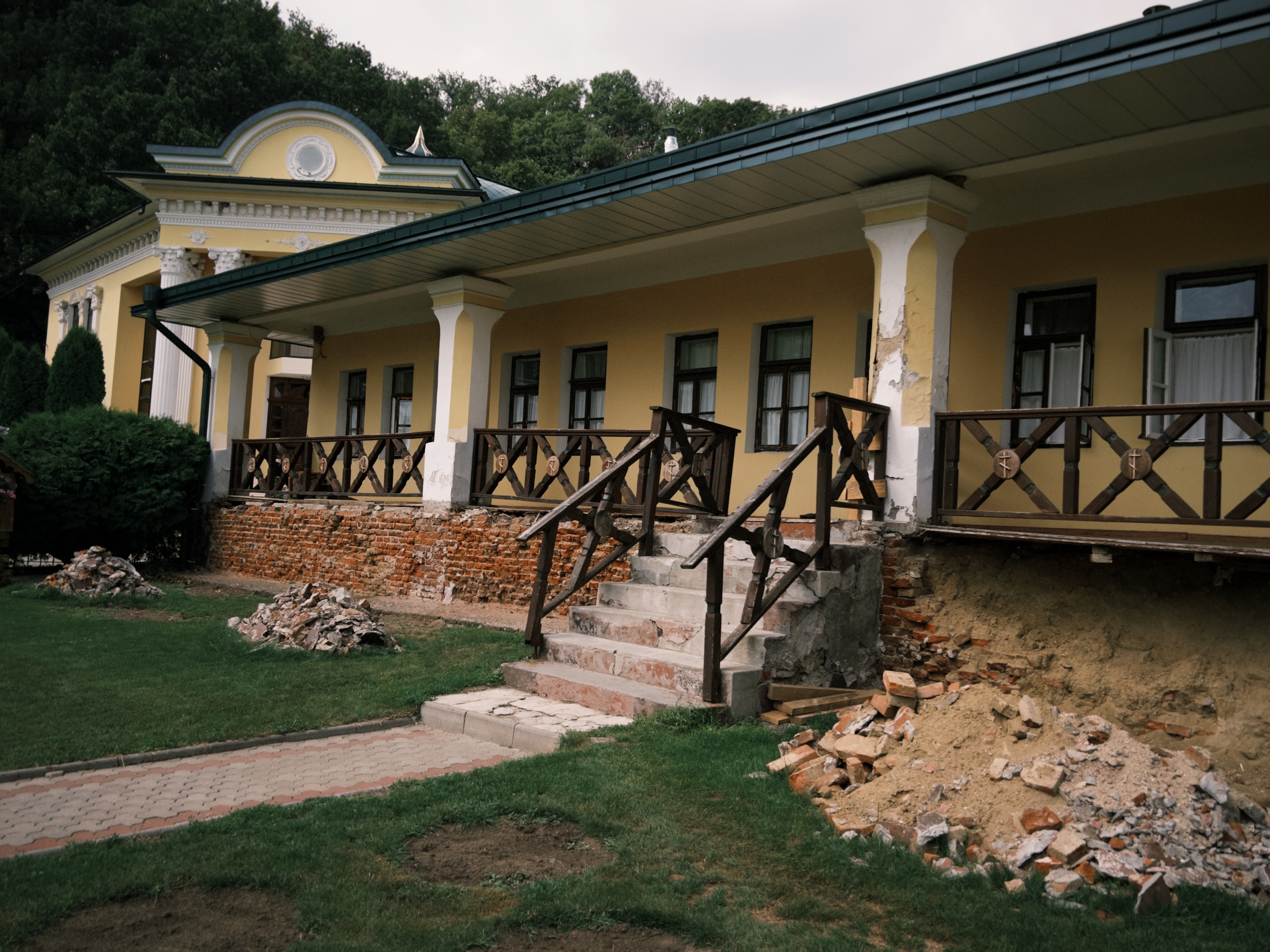
A view of one of the buildings.
