= Bursuc =

- Village
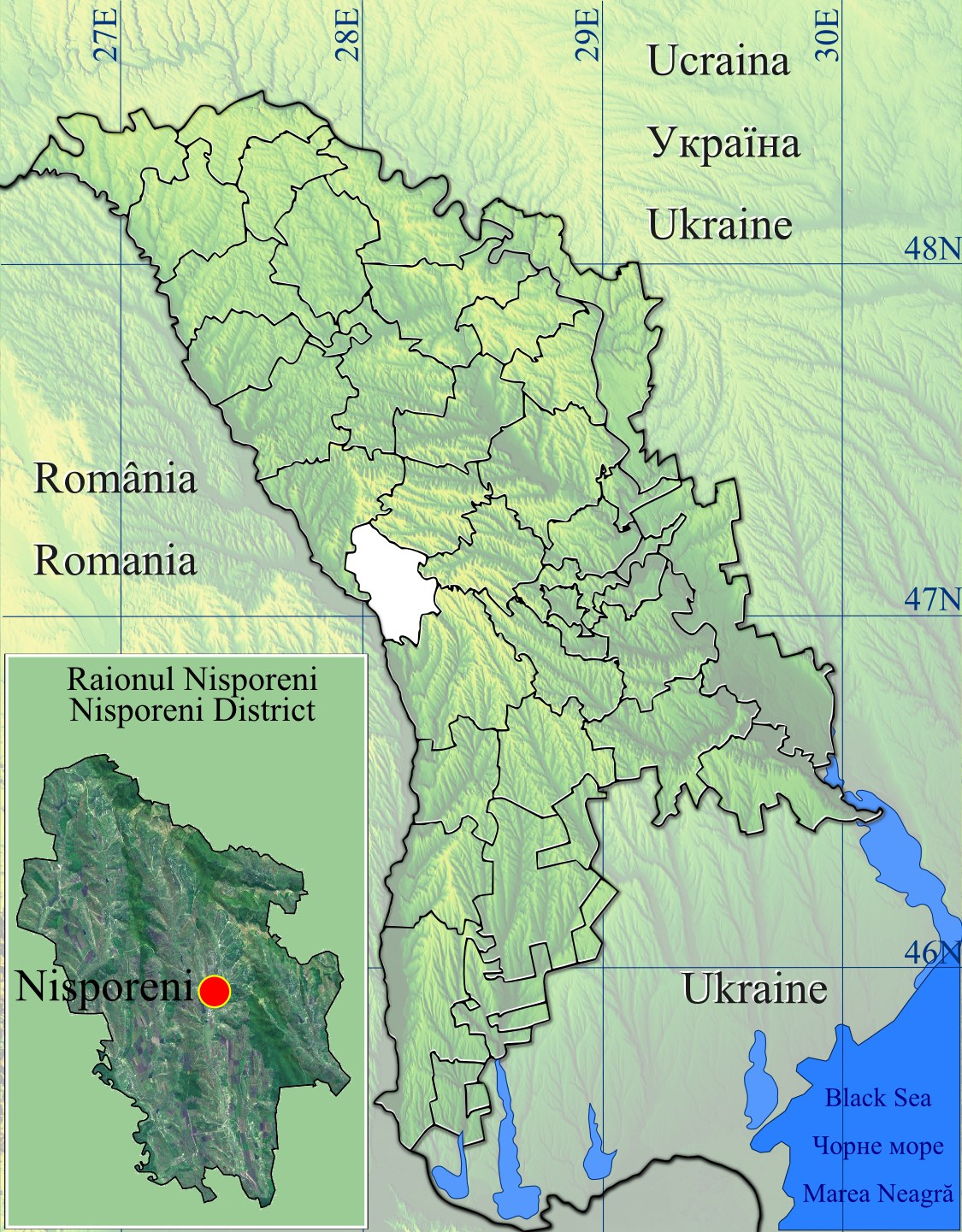
- Location within Nisporeni
- Coordinates: 47°5′46″N 28°18′15″E
- Country: Moldova

Government
  - Mayor: Victor Rusu (PDM)
- Elevation: 333 m (1,093 ft)

Population (2014 census)
  - Total: 1,208
- Time zone: UTC+2 (EET)
  - Summer (DST): UTC+3 (EEST)
- Postal code: MD-6442

Bursuc is a village in Nisporeni District, Moldova.

== See also ==
- Hâncu Monastery
