= Dinu Plîngău =

Moldovan politician (born 1994)

Dinu Plîngău MP
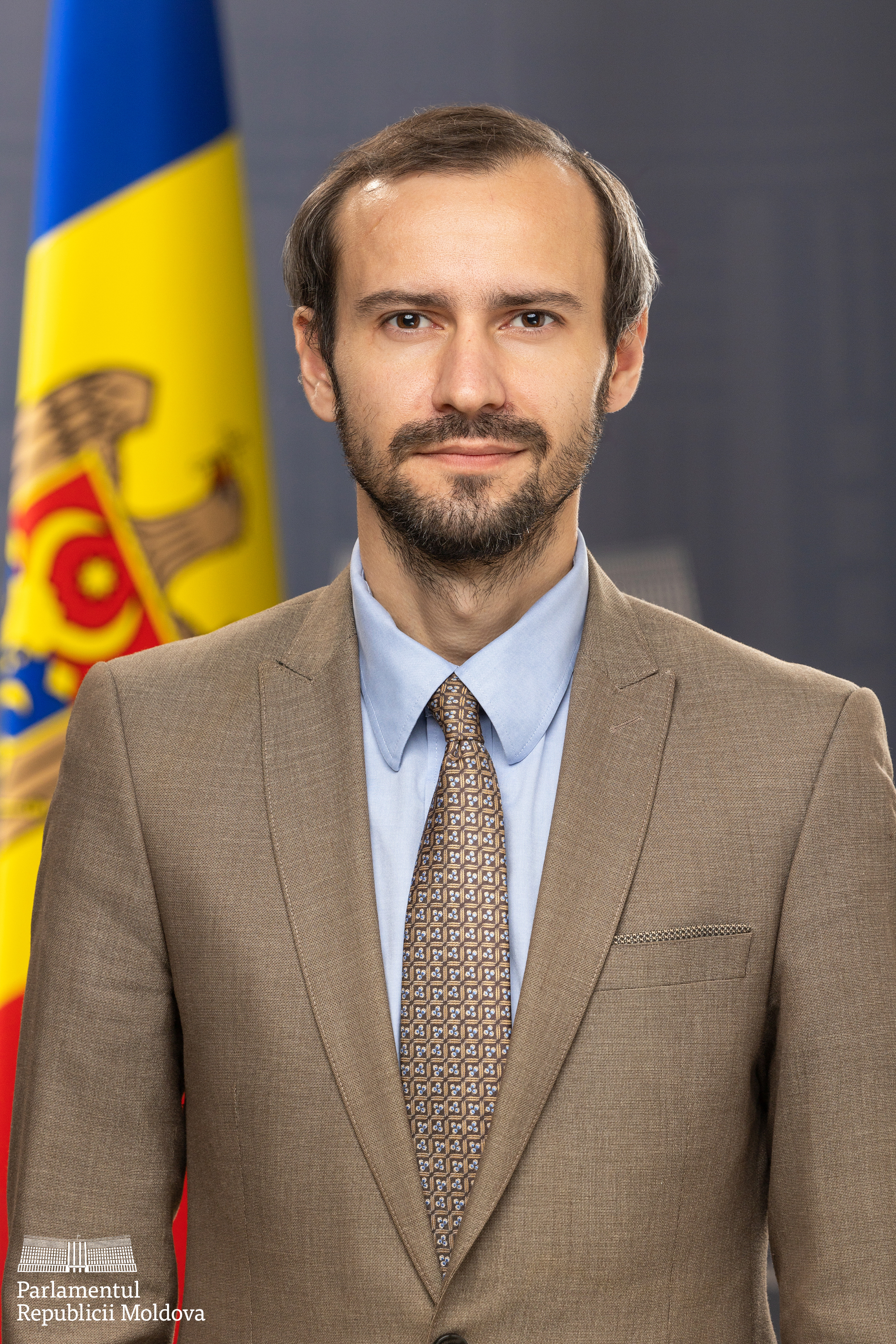
- Official portrait, 2025

Member of the Moldovan Parliament
- Incumbent
- Assumed office 22 October 2025
- Parliamentary group: Party of Action and Solidarity
- In office 9 March 2019 – 23 July 2021
- Parliamentary group: Dignity and Truth Platform

President of the Dignity and Truth Platform
- In office 8 May 2022 – 18 July 2025
- Preceded by: Andrei Năstase
- Succeeded by: Liviu Vovc

Personal details
- Born: 13 April 1994 (age 32) Edineț, Moldova
- Education: Moldova State University

Dinu Plîngău (born 13 April 1994) is a Moldovan politician, member of the Parliament of Moldova. He was the youngest deputy in that legislature. On July 13, 2021, he became the interim president of the DA Platform, later, he was elected the president of the formation during the party congress on May 8, 2022, for a five-year term. He was re-elected to Parliament in 2025.
