= National Unity Party (Moldova) =

Moldovan political party

National Unity Party Partidul Unității Naționale
- Abbreviation: PUN
- President: Alexandru Cimbriciuc
- General Secretary: Anatol Șalaru
- Founder: Ana Guțu
- Founded: 14 February 2016; 9 years ago (Right); 11 June 2017; 8 years ago (National Unity Party)
- Dissolved: 17 September 2023; 2 years ago
- Merged into: Liberal Democratic Party of Moldova
- Headquarters: Str. Serghei Lazo №3, Chișinău
- Newspaper: Clopotul
- Youth wing: National Unity Youth
- Membership (2019): 4,465
- Ideology: Christian democracy Moldovan-Romanian unionism Pro-Europeanism
- Political position: Centre-right
- Romanian counterpart: People's Movement Party (2017–2023)
- Colours: Maroon and white
- Parliament: 0 / 101
- District Presidents: 0 / 32

Website
- pun.md

The National Unity Party (Romanian: Partidul Unității Naționale; PUN), known before 11 June 2017 as the Right (Romanian: Dreapta), was a Moldovan political party founded in June 2017, having as its main political goal the unification with Romania of the territory between the rivers Prut and Nistru (also known as Bessarabia).

== History ==
On 11 June 2017, the political party Dreapta, founded by Ana Guțu, changed its name to the National Unity Party of Moldova (PUN), at the extraordinary congress of the party. The former defense minister of Moldova, Anatol Șalaru, was elected PUN's executive president, and Ana Guțu was elected first vice president. Both are former members of the Liberal Party (PL).

At an extraordinary congress on 25 June 2017, the former president of Romania, Traian Băsescu, was elected honorary president.

The party merged into the Liberal Democratic Party of Moldova on 17 September 2023.

== Electoral results ==
Parliament
Election	Leader	Performance					Rank	Government
Election	Leader	Votes	%	± pp	Seats	+/–	Rank	Government
2019	Anatol Șalaru	Only constituencies			1 / 101	New	6th	Support (ACUM: (PAS-PPPDA)-PSRM)
2019	Anatol Șalaru	Only constituencies			1 / 101	New	6th	Opposition (PSRM-PDM)
2021	Octavian Țîcu	6,646	0,45%		0 / 101	▼1	10th	Extra-parliamentary

President
Election	Candidate	First round		Second round		Result
Election	Candidate	Votes	%	Votes	%	Result
2016	Ana Guțu	2,453	0.17%			Lost ✗
2020	Octavian Țîcu	27,170	2.01%			Lost ✗
