= Anatol Șalaru =

Moldovan politician

Anatol Șalaru OR
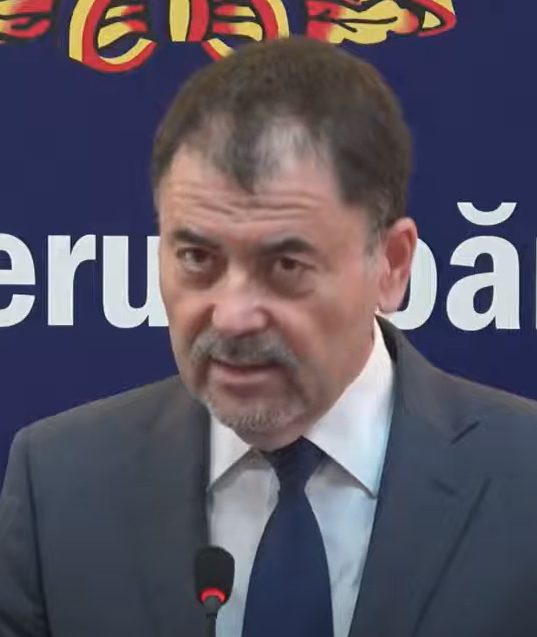
- Șalaru in 2016

Minister of Defense
- In office 30 July 2015 – 27 December 2016
- President: Nicolae Timofti; Igor Dodon
- Prime Minister: Valeriu Streleț; Gheorghe Brega (acting); Pavel Filip
- Preceded by: Viorel Cibotaru
- Succeeded by: Eugen Sturza

Member of the Moldovan Parliament
- In office 9 December 2014 – 30 July 2015
- Parliamentary group: Liberal Party
- In office 22 April 2009 – 25 September 2009
- Parliamentary group: Liberal Party
- In office 10 March 1990 – 27 February 1994
- Parliamentary group: Popular Front
- Constituency: Ialoveni

Minister of Transport and Roads Infrastructure
- In office 25 September 2009 – 30 May 2013
- President: Mihai Ghimpu (acting); Vladimir Filat (acting); Marian Lupu (acting); Nicolae Timofti
- Prime Minister: Vladimir Filat
- Preceded by: Vasile Ursu
- Succeeded by: Vasile Botnari

Personal details
- Born: 2 February 1962 (age 64) Văratic, Moldavian SSR, Soviet Union (now Moldova)
- Party: Liberal Party (1993-2016); National Unity Party (2017–present)
- Profession: veterinarian

Anatol Șalaru (born 7 February 1962) is a Moldovan politician who served as Minister of Transport and Roads Infrastructure from 2009 to 2013 and Minister of Defense from 2015 to 2016. He was member of Parliament of Moldova from 1990 to 1994 and from 2014 to 2015.

Șalaru was leader of Liberal Party (previously known as Reform Party) from 1993 to 1998. He has been leader of National Unity Party since 2017.

== Biography ==
He was born 7 February 1962 and graduated from a rural high school. He is a veterinarian by profession and worked as a researcher in the field of hygiene and epidemiology. In 1988, he initiated the creation of the literary socio-political circle "Alexei Mateevici" (named for the Moldavian poet), who gathered in crowded places, and began a campaign to collect signatures for proclaiming the Romanian language as the state language and returning to the Latin script. In the early 1990s, he became a deputy of the first Parliament of Moldova. During the Transnistrian War of 1991-1992, he fled to Romania, where he successfully sat out from participation in hostilities. In 1993, he founded the Reform Party and was its chairman until 1997. Later this party became the Liberal Party. In 1996-2008, he worked for Ascom Group, the largest Moldovan oil and gas company, serving as administrative director in Moldova (1996-1997), general director of the Ascom representative office in Turkmenistan (1997-1999), project director of Ascom Grup (2002-2003), director of the representative office Ascom in Iraq (2003-2008). From 2017–2019, he was Chairman of the National Unity Party and has since 2019 served as General Secretary.

According to Șalaru himself, he owned as of 2011 a 1996 Mercedes Gelendavagen car, which he purchased for $30,000 in 1998 from President Saparmurat Niyazov of Turkmenistan. According to media reports, Șalaru owned another Mercedes, which was registered in Romania.

=== Minister of Transport and Road Infrastructure ===
From 25 September 2009 to 30 May 2013 he was Minister of Transport and Road Infrastructure in the government of Prime Minister Vlad Filat. While in this position, he stated that road repair in the cold season poses no danger to the quality of work "because Soviet materials are not used now", and that in 2009 ninety-five percent of roads in the country are in poor condition, but by 2013 such a definition as a "bad road" will not be at all.

In the summer of 2012, in one of the parliamentary sessions at which Șalaru, as Minister of Transport, made a report, ended in a brawl between him and PCRM deputy Grigory Petrenko. PCRM leader Vladimir Voronin publicly supported his party member and was critical of Salaru After the Filat’s government resigned, there was a conflict between Șalaru and Filat, during which Salaru publicly accused Filat of not voting for the Prime Minister’s candidate Lyanke, to which Filat called Anatoly Șalaru a liar in his Facebook reply.

=== Minister of Defense ===
On 30 July 2015, he became Minister of Defense of Moldova. Immediately after taking office, he announced, after meeting with the Minister of National Defense of Romania, about his intention to change the military doctrine of Moldova towards rapprochement with NATO and the opening of the NATO office in Chișinău in autumn 2015. He sharply criticized the military parade in Tiraspol, held on 2 September 2015 on the occasion of the Republic Day of Transnistria, calling the presence of the Russian military attaché an unfriendly action of Moscow. In September 2015, on his instructions and with his personal participation, the T-34 tank mounted on the territory of the Ștefan cel Mare 2nd Motorized Infantry Brigade in Chișinău was removed from the pedestal. According to Șalaru, the tank will be exhibited in the Museum of Soviet Occupation (which was established on his orders that year), along with five more monumental tanks planned for dismantling. In November 2016, he agreed with the Minister of Defense of Ukraine, Stepan Poltorak, on the provision of a corridor for the withdrawal of part of the troops from the Operational Group of Russian Forces from the territory of the PMR, without coordination with Russia and the PMR. He was dismissed on 27 December 2016.
