= Moldovan protests (2022–2023) =

Protests against the country's government

2022–2023 Moldovan protests
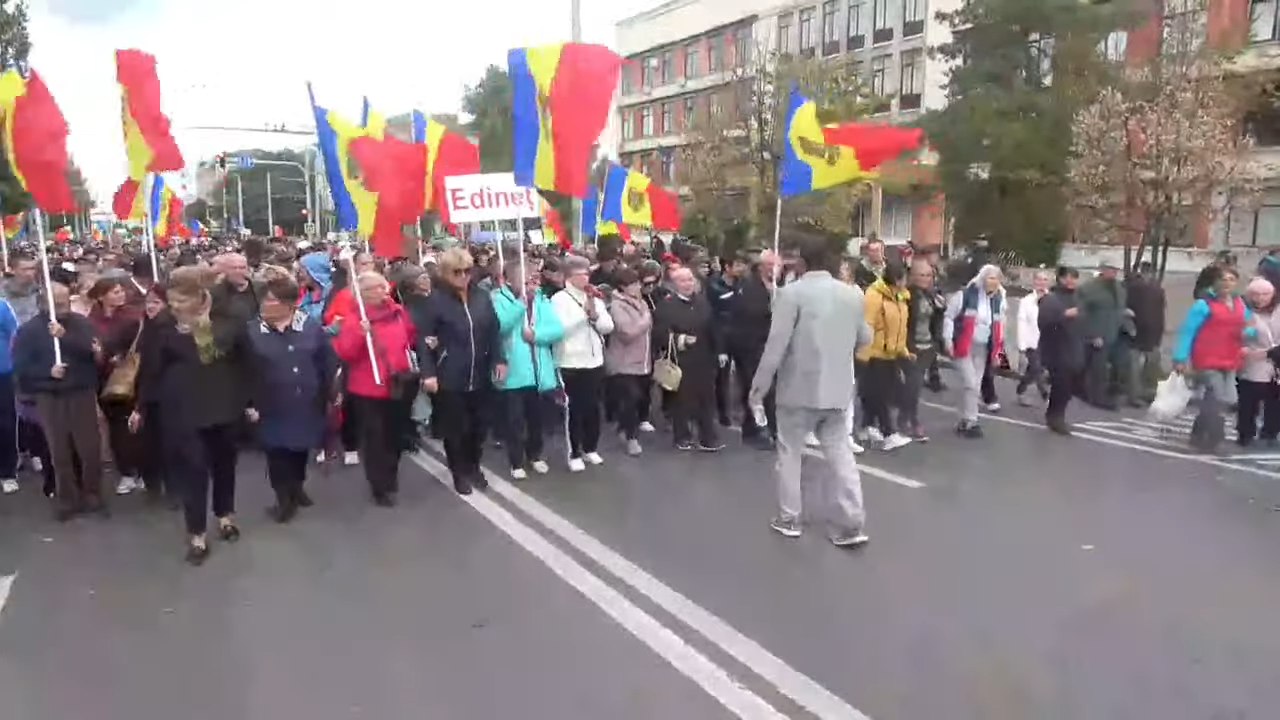
- Protesters on 2 October 2022 in Chișinău
- Date: 18 September 2022 – 19 June 2023
- Location: (Moldova) Chișinău and other Moldovan localities (Romania) Bucharest (France) Strasbourg
- Caused by: Energy crisis; Rising natural gas prices and inflation; Ilan Shor; Criticism over government handling of the Russian invasion of Ukraine; Moldovan application for EU membership; Change of the state language of Moldova from "Moldovan" to Romanian (since March 2023)
- Goals: Resignation of the Gavrilița Cabinet; Resignation of the Recean Cabinet; Resignation of Maia Sandu; Dissolution of the Parliament; Early elections; Strengthening Moldova–Russia relations; Moldovan accession to Russia (fringe factions); Preservation and restoration of Moldovan as the state language of Moldova (since March 2023)
- Methods: Demonstrations; Protest marches; Sit-ins; Occupations; Picketings; Roadblock; Flash mob; Internet activism
- Result: Opposition suppressed: Gavrilița Cabinet resigned on 10 February 2023; Dorin Recean becomes the new Prime-minister on 16 February 2023; Romanian officially replaces "Moldovan" as the state language of Moldova on 23 March 2023; Ilan Shor is sentenced to 15 years to prison on graft charges in absentia on 13 April 2023; Șor Party's Evghenia Guțul wins the 2023 Gagauz gubernatorial election; Emergence of the Revival Party as a pro-Șor splinter of the PSRM; The Șor Party is banned on 19 June 2023

Parties
| Opposition; Șor Party; Chance. Duties. Realization.; Ours; Party of Socialists of the Republic of Moldova; Party of Communists of the Republic of Moldova; We Build Europe at Home Party; Common Action Party – Civil Congress; National Liberation Movement; Revival Party; Paid protester; Supported by: Russia (allegedly, denied by Ilan Shor); Federal Security Service; Wagner Group (alleged); (Chechnya) Kadyrovites (alleged by Ukraine); Transnistria (allegedly) | Government of Moldova; Party of Action and Solidarity; National Alternative Movement; Ministry of Internal Affairs; General Inspectorate of Police; Counterprotesters; Unionists; Supported by: Romania; Ukraine |

Lead figures
| Ilan Shor; Marina Tauber; Evghenia Guțul; Irina Vlah; Igor Dodon; Vlad Batrîncea; Vladimir Voronin; Gheorghe Cavcaliuc; Iurie Muntean; Mark Tkaciuk; Victor Druță; Serghei Mișin; Vlad Bilețchi (allegedly, denied by Bilețchi); Vladimir Plahotniuc (allegedly) | Maia Sandu; Natalia Gavrilița (until 16 February 2023); Dorin Recean (after 16 February 2023); Igor Grosu; Ion Ceban |

Number
| 50,000 anti-government protesters | 75,000 pro-EU protesters (police estimate) |

Casualties
- Arrested: 4

On 18 September 2022, protests in Moldova began in the capital city of Chișinău, demanding the resignation of the country's pro-Western government, amid a Moldovan energy crisis, partly as a consequence of the Russian invasion of Ukraine, causing rising natural gas prices and inflation.

The pro-Russian Șor Party have been instrumental in the organisation of the protests. It is alleged by the Moldovan government that the party has been offering cash payments to people to attend the protests and has also been providing free transportation to the capital for protest attendees, with funds provided by Ilan Shor, the oligarch and leader of the Șor Party who had fled Moldova amid corruption charges and who has been sentenced to 15 years in prison. The Șor party would be outlawed by the Moldovan Constitutional Court on 19 June 2023 with its former members being further barred from participating in the upcoming 2023 Moldovan local elections, regardless of their new political affiliation. Following the dismantling of the Șor party, large scale coordinated protests ceased.

== Timeline ==
=== 2022 ===
==== September ====
- On 18 September, about 20,000 people attended a protest in Chișinău, demanding that the country's pro-Western government resign.

==== October ====
- On 13 October, the authorities of the Republic of Moldova decided to ban rallies that block traffic lanes, transport arteries or access roads to public institutions during the week, these being allowed only on weekends for a maximum duration of four hours.
- On 14 October, several people came out to protest in the center of the capital against the measure taken by the authorities, and at least 4 people were detained.
- On 18 October, the Russian National Liberation Movement launched a campaign in Gagauzia to "recognize as illegal the dissolution of the Soviet Union and the restoration of the borders of the former Soviet Union in accordance with the results of World War II".
- On 26 October 2022, Ilan Shor and Vladimir Plahotniuc were sanctioned by the United States Department of the Treasury over their association with the Russian government.

==== November ====
- On 6 November, over 50,000 supporters of the Șor party took part in a protest in the national capital of Chișinău, once again demanding the resignation of the pro-western government and snap parliamentary elections.
- On 8 November, the Moldovan government announced that it had requested the constitutional court to initiate proceedings for the outlawing of Ilan Shor's "Șor" party in Moldova, due to it allegedly promoting the interests of a foreign state and harming national independence and sovereignty.
- On 13 November, thousands of anti-government protesters returned to the streets of Chișinău.

==== December ====
- On 7 December, Ilan Shor asked President Maia Sandu to nominate him as Prime Minister of Moldova.
- On 11 December, a new anti-government protest took place in Chișinău (at the US embassy in Chișinău and at the headquarters of the ruling PAS party), this initiated by the We Build Europe at Home Party (PACE).
- On 15 December, within the Orheileaks investigation, the links between the Șor protesters and the unionist activist Vlad Bilețchi were exposed. The latter denied any association with protesters.
- On 18 December, the Party of Socialists of the Republic of Moldova (PSRM) organized a protest in Ungheni.
- On 19 December, six TV channels in Moldova linked to Ilan Shor (Prime TV, RTR Moldova, Accent TV, NTV Moldova, TV6 and Orhei TV) were temporarily suspended, on charges of making pro-Russian propaganda and spreading false information about the Russian-Ukrainian war. The channels continued streaming on other platforms.

=== 2023 ===
==== January ====
- On 25 January, representatives from the six suspended TV channels, including TV6 journalist Alexei Lungu, protested in Bucharest against the decision in Moldova to suspend them. The next day, on 26 January, the journalists protested at the Council of Europe in Strasbourg. On the same day, Russian deputies Leonid Kalashnikov and Svetlana Zhurova warned that Moldova's intentions to unite with Romania, and thus joining NATO, may lead to its destruction.
- On 26 January, several hundred pensioners from among supporters of the Șor Party protested on Thursday at the presidential building, demanding the resignation of Sandu.

==== February ====
- On 2 February Moldova passed a law introducing criminal penalties for separatism, including prison terms. The law continues with penalties for financing and inciting separatism, plotting against Moldova and collecting and stealing information that could harm the country's sovereignty, independence and integrity.
- On 2 February, Russian foreign minister Sergey Lavrov declared that Moldova might have Ukraine's fate (meaning to be attacked by Russia) if the Moldovan president Maia Sandu, who has Romanian citizenship, wants Moldova to unite with Romania and join NATO.
- On 9 February, the Ukrainian president Volodymyr Zelenskyy declared in the European Parliament that the Ukrainian secret services discovered a plan to overthrow the current Moldovan leadership and replace it with a pro-Russian one. He also declared that these plans have been sent to the Moldovan government. Russia denied any allegations.
- On 10 February, the Prime Minister and government of the Republic of Moldova resigned.
- On 13 February, Maia Sandu announced a violent plan of Russia, with terrorist attacks and hostage-taking, to overthrow the PAS-led government. Irina Vlah, governor of Gagauzia, claimed that "Sandu makes excuses to turn Moldova into a police state".
- On 16 February, a new cabinet led by Dorin Recean was sworn in. The new Prime-minister declared that Moldova's neutrality would not protect the country from any military aggression.
- On 19 February, thousands of pro-Russian protesters took part in a protest in the national capital of Chișinău, once again demanding the resignation of the pro-western government. Despite the fact that Marina Tauber, the leader of the protesters, denied any link with the Russian authorities, some protesters requested a Russian military intervention in Moldova and its accession into Russia. Ukrainian politician Mykhailo Podolyak claimed that Russia is trying to organise a coup d'etat in Moldova. Several other people organised a counter-protest, marching with Romanian and NATO flags. On the same day, Moldovan Prime-minister Dorin Recean demanded an end to the Russian military presence in Transnistria and a peaceful reunification of Moldova and Transnistria. Dmitry Peskov, the press secretary of the Russian president Vladimir Putin, claimed that Moldova's rulers are provoking Anti-Russian hysteria. Russian deputy Sergey Mironov, leader of A Just Russia — For Truth, who has close relations with the Moldovan socialists, threatened with a Russian military attack if Moldova enters Transnistria; he also claimed that Transnistria's accession to Moldova is a dream of Moldo-Romanian nationalists.
- On 21 February, Russian president Vladimir Putin revoked the decree that underpinned Moldova's sovereignty in resolving the Transnistria conflict. On the same day, Prime-minister Dorin Recean declared that Russia tried to take the Chișinău Airport under its control, in order to bring Russian and pro-Russian diversionists to stage a coup and overthrow the Moldovan government.
- On 24 February, after 1 year since the start of the Russian invasion of Ukraine, Ukrainian refugees and Moldovans organised a protest in front of the Russian embassy in Chișinău against the war.
- On 27 February, Wizz Air announced that it will suspend all flights to and from Chișinău Airport, due to security concerns linked to rising tensions with Russia. Most of the routes will be relocated to the Iași Airport in Romania.

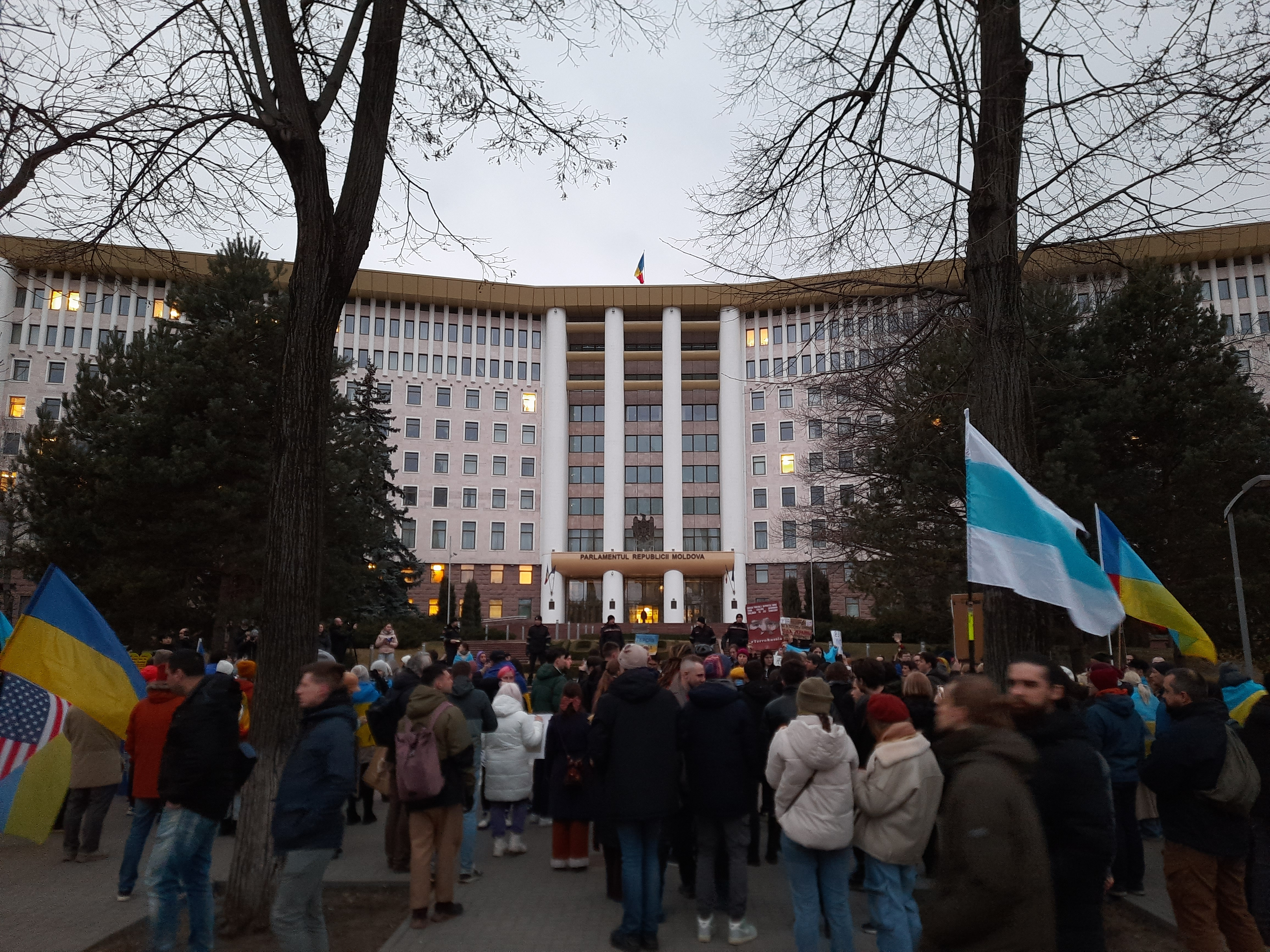
Ukrainians and Moldovans protesting in front of the Moldovan Parliament in Chișinău against the Russian invasion of Ukraine, on 24 February 2023

==== March ====
- On 2 March, the Moldovan parliament voted the change of the state language from "Moldovan" to Romanian. The idea was supported by the ruling Party of Action and Solidarity and was strongly opposed by the Bloc of Communists and Socialists. The Academy of Sciences of Moldova also supported this decision. On the same day, the Moldovan Parliament adopted a resolution condemning the 2022 Russian invasion of Ukraine. Maria Zakharova, the Spokeswoman for the Ministry of Foreign Affairs of Russia, warned Moldova to give up the "anti-Russian rhetoric". The bill was approved on its second and final reading on 16 March.
- On 6 March, the Bloc of Communists and Socialists organized a protest in front of the Constitutional Court of Moldova against changing the name of the official language from "Moldovan" to Romanian. PAS leaders claimed that they are backed by Russia. There was also a counter-protest, in support of the Romanian language.
- On 26 March, tens of people protested at the Stephen the Great Monument in Chișinău, demanding the unification of Moldova and Romania. An anti-unionist counter-protest was also organised by some people.

==== April ====
- On 13 April, Shor was sentenced to 15 years in prison in absentia on graft charges.
- On 27 April, a NATO flag was trampled by a group of people, right in front of the NATO Information Centre in Chișinău, by a group of people led by deputies Alexandr Nesterovschi (who recently left the Socialist Party and started collaborating with the Șor Party) and Irina Lozovan. They tore down the NATO flag and sprayed it with red paint, symbolizing blood.
- On 27 April, the Moldovan Parliament voted to strip Ilan Shor of his membership of the Parliament. He was succeeded by Vladimir Vitiuc.

==== May ====
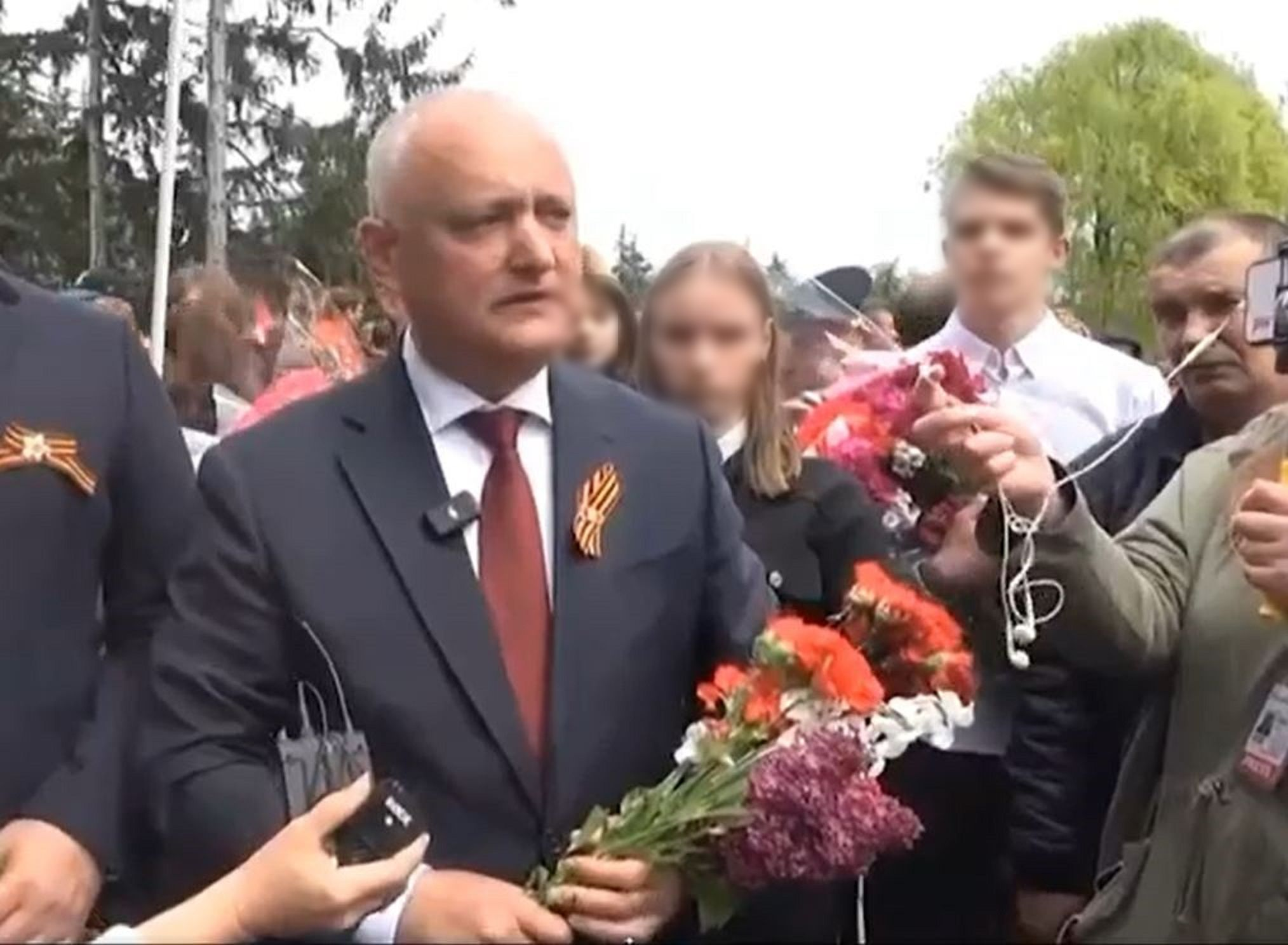
Moldovan former president Igor Dodon (wearing the Ribbon of Saint George) with members of the Șor Party at a pro-Russian rally on 9 May 2023

- On 1 May, Șor Party's vice president, Marina Tauber, was arrested at the Chișinău Airport on charges of corruption while trying to flee the country to Israel.
- On 9 May, the ruling PAS commemorated the victims of World War 2 at the Eternity Memorial Complex in Chișinău, while the pro-Russian Șor Party and the Bloc of Communists and Socialists celebrated, along with several Russian diplomats and Russia's ambassador to Moldova, the "Soviet victory against fascism". Pro-Russian demonstrators marched with the Ribbon of Saint George, Z and pictures of Joseph Stalin.
- On 14 May, Șor Party's Evghenia Guțul won the Gagauz gubernatorial election, defeating independent PSRM-supported Grigorii Uzun. Her election campaign was based on populism (one of her promises being building an airport in Comrat) and the promise of a closer relationship with Russia. Maria Zakharova, the spokeswoman of the Russian Foreign Ministry, declared that Guțul's win shows that the Gagauz people oppose Maia Sandu's attempt of Romanianization and derussification of Gagauzia.
- On 21 May, the Moldovan government organised the European Moldova National Assembly, a massive pro-European rally in Chișinău where, according to some sources, over 75,000 people participated (according to Deutsche Welle there were over 100,000 participants). Among the participants were the Moldovan president Maia Sandu, Chișinău mayor Ion Ceban, President of the European Parliament Roberta Metsola, Romanian MEP Siegfried Mureșan and Cristian Leon Țurcanu, the Romanian ambassador to Moldova. Pro-European rallies were also organised by Moldovan diaspora communities in Brescia, Padova, Venice, London, Riga, Bucharest, Iași, Brussels, Vilnius, Rome, Prague, Milan, Vienna, Strasbourg, Paris, Tallinn, Berlin, Dublin, Madrid, and Stockholm. On the same day, the Șor Party organized counterprotests in Comrat, Bălți and Orhei, with the main goal being a referendum to decide the future of Moldova's foreign policy. Șor Party claimed that the counterprotests were attended by more that 60,000 people.
- On 22 May 2023, former PSRM deputies Alexandr Nesterovschi, Irina Lozovan, Vasile Bolea and Alexandr Suhodolschi joined the Revival Party, led by Serghei Mișin. Bolea declared that the party promotes the values of Eastern Orthodox Christianity, traditionalism, Moldovan nationalism, and that the party wants to become the largest left-wing force of Moldova. The party also wants the Russian language to become one of the state languages of Moldova. It is now considered a satellite party of the Șor Party.
- On 31 May, European Union imposed sanctions against Vladimir Plahotniuc, Ilan Shor and Marina Tauber, due to their association with the Russian government.

==== June ====
- On 3 June, a pro-Russian rally was organised in Chișinău by the Revival Party, Șor Party and the Bloc of Communists and Socialists. The protest was against the Moldovan government's decision to replace the Victory Day with the Time of Remembrance and Reconciliation for Those Who Lost Their Lives during the Second World War.
- On 19 June, the Șor Party was outlawed by the Constitutional Court of Moldova. Șor declared that the party will continue its activity and that it will contest in the next elections despite such an action being illegal and any votes for Șor being invalid. Maria Zakharova, the spokeswoman of the Russian foreign ministry, declared that Maia Sandu wants to become the "Romanian Queen of Moldova".

=== Aftermath ===
- On 26 June, Șor announced the creation of the Chance. Duties. Realization political bloc, to continue the Șor Party's activity. On the same day, the pro-Russian activist Mihail Ahremțev, who is also the leader of the Ours Party (a founding party of Șor's bloc), encouraged Moldovans on his Facebook page to join the Russian Army and fight in Ukraine.
- On 7 July, the Revival Party organised a protest in Chișinău against Moldova's proposed withdrawal from the Commonwealth of Independent States.
- On 24 August, the Bloc of Communists and Socialists, together with the Russian Embassy in Chișinău, organized a rally to celebrate the Liberation Day.

== Reactions ==
=== Russia ===
On 10 March 2023, the Russian Minister of Foreign Affairs Sergey Lavrov accused the West of having double standards because it supports the anti-government protests in Georgia but condemns those in the Republic of Moldova.

=== USA ===
October 2022 Ilan Shor and the Șor Party sanctioned by the USA.

=== EU ===
- In March 2023 the European Union offers full support on Moldova's road to membership of the bloc.
- In May 2023 the EU imposed sanctions on people associated with the Șor Party.

=== Moldova ===
- December 2022 six television stations broadcasting Russian programmes, linked to Ilan Shor, had their licences revoked.
- April 2023, Ilan Shor had his 2017 sentence following conviction doubled, to 15 years in prison with all his assets frozen.
- May 2023 the government encouraged anti-protest demonstrations, aimed at showing the popular desire to join the EU.
- 1 May 2023, the Șor party's vice president, Marina Tauber, was detained.
- 19 June 2023, the Șor Party was outlawed by the Constitutional Court of Moldova.
- 26 July 2023, Moldova expelled 45 Russian diplomats and embassy staff because of "unfriendly actions".
- 3 October the Constitutional Court of Moldova ruled that Article 16 of the Electoral Code is unconstitutional and that former members of the Șor Party can stand for elections. On 4 October, the Exceptional Situations Committee upheld the ban on the Șor party and also decided that all former members of the party that are charged, indicted, or even under suspicion of committing criminal acts will be banned from participating in the 2023 Moldovan local elections. The bans on 21 candidates were amended on 4 October to run for 3 years.
- 6 October, Maia Sandu, in an interview with the Financial Times, claimed that earlier in the year the Wagner Group attempted to turn the protests into a violent insurrection which would allow them to stage a coup to topple her government. Additionally, she also claimed that Yevgeny Prigozhin personally contributed to the 20 million Euros the Moldovan intelligence service intercepted to pro-Russian groups.

== See also ==
- Economic impact of the 2022 Russian invasion of Ukraine
