= 2024 Moldovan European Union membership constitutional referendum =

Constitutional referendum in Moldova

- 20 October 2024
- Do you support the amendment of the Constitution with a view to the accession of the Republic of Moldova to the European Union?

Results
Choice	Votes	%
Yes	749,719	50.35%
No	739,155	49.65%
Valid votes	1,488,874	97.22%
Invalid or blank votes	42,518	2.78%
Total votes	1,531,392	100.00%
Registered voters/turnout	3,020,814	50.69%
- Results by first-level administrative divisions, sectors of Chișinău and abroad Yes: 50–55% 55–60% 60–65% 65–70% 75–80% No: 50–55% 55–60% 60–65% 65–70% 70–75% 75–80% 90–95%

A nationwide constitutional referendum was held in Moldova on 20 October 2024 on whether the country should amend the Constitution of Moldova to include the Moldovan citizens' wish for European Union membership, in order to make it harder for future governments to shift the country away from its pro-European trajectory. The referendum occurred on the same day as the first round of the 2024 Moldovan presidential election. The proposal was approved and the constitution amended.

Incumbent president Maia Sandu campaigned for the "yes" side in the referendum. A narrow majority of votes were in favour of Moldova's EU aspirations, though the referendum was described as closer than expected. The voter turnout of 50% exceeded the 33.33% requirement for the referendum to be considered binding. Earlier, Sandu had told Moldovans that there was "clear evidence" that criminal groups backed by "foreign forces hostile to our national interests" had aimed to buy off 300,000 votes. The European Union meanwhile welcomed the results and condemned the "unprecedented malign interference by Russia".

== Background ==
In March 2022, following Russia's invasion of neighboring Ukraine, Moldova submitted an application for EU membership. That June Moldova was granted the status of a candidate country by the European Council. In December 2023, the European Council announced its decision to open accession negotiations with Moldova. Moldova set a target date of 2030 for EU accession.

President Sandu had announced her intention to seek re-election in 2023. Sandu also announced the launch of an online platform aimed at promoting the referendum and advocating for the benefits of EU membership to the country. Observers noted she is gearing up to focus her efforts on EU integration, an area where she and her party PAS have experienced consistent success in order to be re-elected.

In March 2024, Sandu expressed her hope that the referendum would coincide with the presidential elections scheduled for the autumn. Sandu said; "It is important to hold a referendum now because it is a historic occasion, awaited for three decades. The European Union member states are more open than ever, we have the necessary political will for this step, and our citizens want to be part of the EU."

On 21 March 2024, the Parliament of Moldova endorsed a resolution of 54-to-0 to continue the efforts to join the European Union. The declaration asserted, "Only joining Europe can ensure the future of the country as a sovereign, neutral, and fully democratic state". During the vote, all opposition parties in parliament walked out. On 16 May, Parliament approved the holding of the referendum in conjunction with the presidential election on 20 October.

=== Gagauzia ===
On 2 February 2014, the Autonomous Territorial Unit of Gagauzia held two referendums on European integration. In one, 98.4% voted in favour of joining the Customs Union of Belarus, Kazakhstan, and Russia, while in the second 97.2% opposed further integration with the EU. 98.9% of voters also supported the proposition that Gagauzia could declare independence if Moldova unified with Romania. There is concern in Gagauzia that Moldova's integration with the EU could lead to such a unification with EU member Romania, which is unpopular in the autonomous region.

== Question ==
The Romanian-language voting ballot for the referendum. There were also ballots in Russian, Gagauz, Bulgarian, Romani and Ukrainian.

The text of the question put to the vote was:

Susțineți modificarea Constituției în vederea aderării Republicii Moldova la Uniunea Europeană?

(Do you support the amendment of the Constitution with a view to the accession of the Republic of Moldova to the European Union?)

The options of the vote were "yes" (Romanian: da) and "no" (Romanian: nu).

== Campaign ==
At a meeting in Moscow on 21 April 2024, five opposition parties, namely the banned Șor Party, the Revival Party, Chance, Victorie and the Alternative Force for Saving Moldova, announced the formation of an alliance called Victory to oppose EU membership and seek closer relations with Russia. The leader of Gagauzia, Evghenia Guțul, also expressed support for the movement, which revolves around Șor Party leader, oligarch, and convicted fraudster and money launderer Ilan Shor. Moldovan Infrastructure Minister Andrei Spînu called the members of the coalition "traitors" and suggested that it had been formed "right next to the Kremlin".

Moldovan authorities have accused Russian-trained groups of plotting to destabilise the exercise. In September 2024, incidents of vandalism on the offices of the Supreme Court of Justice of Moldova and on the public broadcaster Teleradio-Moldova were attributed to the said groups. In October 2024, authorities announced on social media the discovery of a plot by Ilan Shor involving vote bribery and anti-European Union propaganda, following raids on 26 locations nationwide. Russia denied the accusations.

Security checks were strengthened at Chișinău International Airport following an influx of passengers from Russia carrying large amounts of cash believed to be connected with the plot. On the day of the referendum, the BBC reported that their producer overheard a voter asking an election monitor where she would get paid for her vote, and after being questioned by the network on the issue, she admitted to have been offered 1,000 ₽ to vote for a candidate and option in the referendum which she did not want to disclose, money which she did not end up receiving.

In mid-October, Moldova accused Russia of plotting to bus in voters to polling stations at the Moldovan Embassy in Moscow. In response, the EU imposed sanctions on five people and one entity involved in the influence operation, while the United States accused Russia of spending "millions of dollars" to support its preferred parties and spreading disinformation online. The Russian foreign ministry in turn accused Moldova of printing only 10,000 ballots for 500,000 eligible Moldovans living in Russia.

On 17 October, Moldovan authorities announced the discovery of another plot in which 100 youths were trained in Moscow, Serbia and Bosnia by private military groups to foment civil unrest, including using nonlethal weapons to create "mass disorder" during the election and referendum, adding that four people had been arrested and that some of them received several thousand euros in payments.

The European Union deployed its Cyber Rapid Response Team led by Lithuania to Moldova in order to oversee cybersecurity concerns in the election and referendum following a request from the Moldovan Information Technology and Cyber Security Service.

== Referendum ==
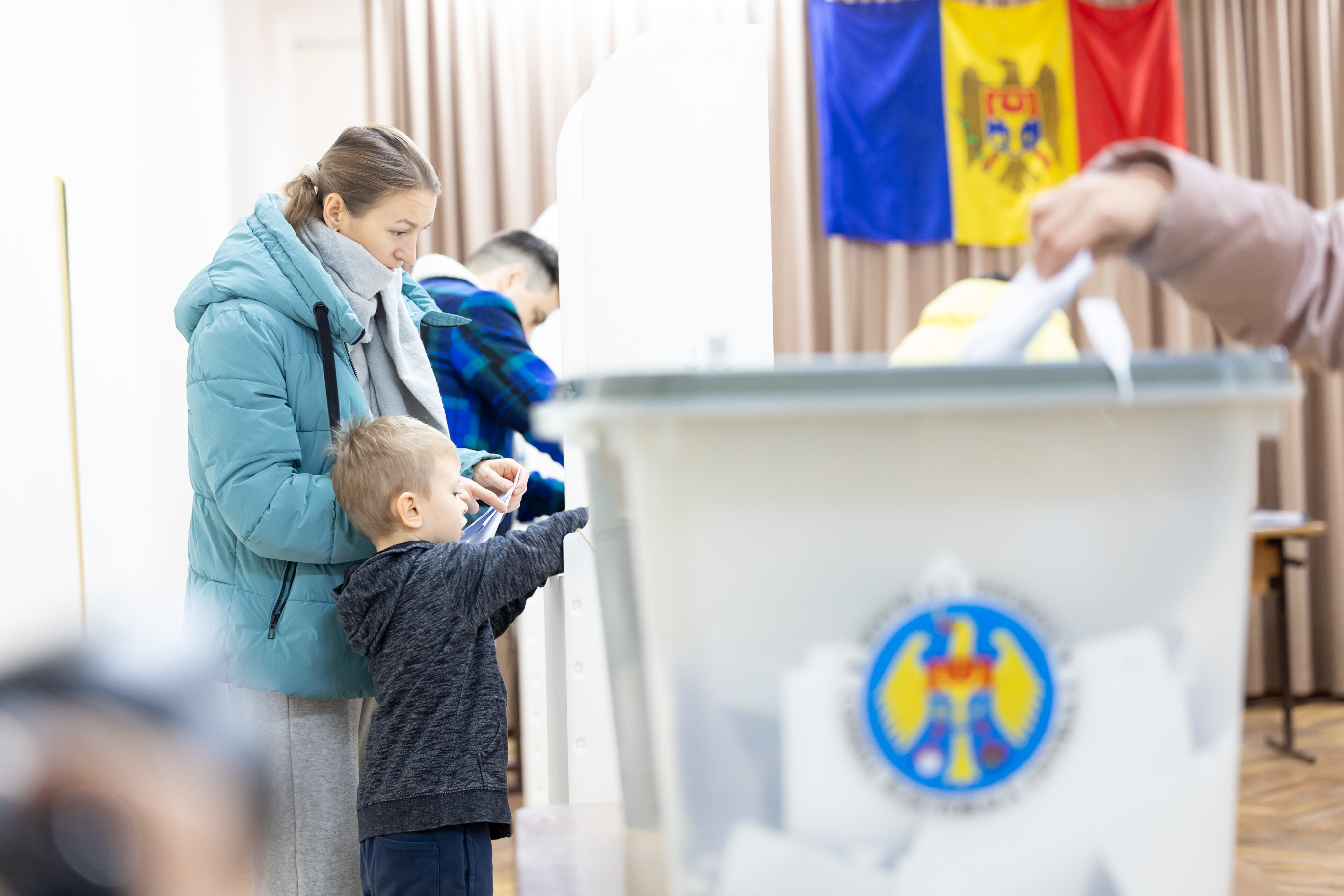
Voting in a polling station on 20 October

Approximately 2.8 million ballots were issued for the referendum and the presidential election. For the first time in Moldova, ballots were featured not only in Romanian but also in as many as five minority languages. Thus, 2,092,641 ballots were in Romanian, 631,979 in Russian, 3,400 in Gagauz, 991 in Bulgarian, 870 in the Romani language and 115 in Ukrainian. For voters in the pro-Russian separatist region of Transnistria, 90,000 ballots were issued, of which 45,000 were in Romanian and the rest in Russian. Voting was held from 07:00 to 21:00.

For the referendum and the election, 234 polling stations were opened abroad. The first vote in both was cast by Ludmila Vizdoagă, a woman who at the time had lived in South Korea for 19 years. She traveled from Seoul to Tokyo to vote in the polling station for Japan, which was the first to be opened. A polling station was also set up in Varnița to serve voters from Transnistria. There were more than 50 polling stations in Italy, 17 in the United States, and two in Russia (both in Moscow).

The referendum was boycotted by several Moldovan political figures, including Party of Socialists of the Republic of Moldova (PSRM) presidential candidate Alexandr Stoianoglo, Our Party (PN) candidate Renato Usatîi and PSRM leader and former president Igor Dodon.

== Registered political parties ==
The Central Electoral Commission of Moldova registered the parties that took part in the referendum campaign. Of the 15 parties officially registered by 20 September, 13 were in favor of the YES option and two were in favor of the NO option. Some parties such as the PSRM or the Party of Development and Consolidation of Moldova (PDCM) boycotted the referendum.

Choice	Parties	Political orientation	Leader	Ref
Yes	Party of Action and Solidarity (PAS)	Liberalism	Igor Grosu	
Yes	National Alternative Movement (MAN)	Social democracy	Ion Ceban	
Yes	European Social Democratic Party (PSDE)	Social democracy	Ion Sula	
Yes	Together (Împreună) (Note: Bloc then consisting of the Dignity and Truth Platform, the League of Cities and Communes (LOC) and the Party of Change)	Liberalism	Octavian Țîcu	
Yes	Ecologist Green Party (PV)	Green politics	Anatolie Prohnițchi	
Yes	Respect Moldova Movement (MRM)	Conservatism	Eugeniu Nichiforciuc	
Yes	Alliance of Liberals and Democrats for Europe (ALDE)	Social liberalism	Arina Spătaru	
Yes	Coalition for Unity and Welfare (CUB)	Liberalism	Igor Munteanu	
Yes	Democracy at Home Party (PPDA)	Populism	Vasile Costiuc	
Yes	Alliance for the Union of Romanians (AUR)	Romanian nationalism	Boris Volosatîi	
Yes	We Political Party (NOI)	Social democracy	Vladimir Dachi	
Yes	Party of National Reunification "Acasă" (PRN)	Moldovan–Romanian unionism	Valentin Dolganiuc	
Yes	Popular Will Party (PVP)	Conservatism	Nicolae Gîrbu	
Yes	Liberal Democratic Party of Moldova (PLDM; excluded from campaign)	Conservatism	Vladimir Filat	
Yes	Liberal Party (PL; excluded from campaign)	Conservative liberalism	Dorin Chirtoacă	
Yes	National Liberal Party (PNL; excluded from campaign)	National liberalism	Mihai Severovan	
Yes	Moldovan National Party (PNM; excluded from campaign)	Pro-Europeanism	Dragoș Galbur	
No	Party of Communists of the Republic of Moldova (PCRM)	Communism	Vladimir Voronin	
No	Revival Party (PR)	Russophilia	Natalia Parasca	
No	Chance (PȘ; excluded from campaign)	Euroscepticism	Alexei Lungu	
Boycott	Party of Socialists of the Republic of Moldova (PSRM)	Democratic socialism	Igor Dodon	
Boycott	Party of Development and Consolidation (PDCM)	Christian democracy	Ion Chicu	
Neutral position	Our Party (PN) (Note: Although the party did not have a position, Usatîi boycotted the referendum, saying "It's my personal decision, but the citizens should do as they know".)	Populism	Renato Usatîi	

== Opinion polls ==
Fieldwork date	Polling firm/ Commissioner	Sample size	Yes	No	None/ Undecided/ Abstention
11–16 Oct 2024	CBS Research–WatchDog	1,034	55.1%	34.5%	10.3%
13–15 Oct 2024	Intellect Group	985	44%	31%	25%
19 Sep – 10 Oct 2024	iData–IPP	1,100	47.9%	23%	29.1%

== Results ==
The outcome of the referendum was described as a closer result than what opinion polls had predicted, amidst allegations of vote buying that were levied against the side opposed to the constitutional change.

Choice	Votes	%
For	749,719	50.35
Against	739,155	49.65
Total	1,488,874	100.00
Valid votes	1,488,874	97.22
Invalid/blank votes	42,518	2.78
Total votes	1,531,392	100.00
Registered voters/turnout	3,020,814	50.69
Source: CEC, sudd.ch

=== Regional results ===
Region	Valid votes	Yes	Yes (%)	No	No (%)
Anenii Noi	29,347	14,336	48.85%	15,011	51.15%
Bălți	49,046	14,430	29.42%	34,616	70.58%
Basarabeasca	8,386	3,075	36.67%	5,311	63.33%
Briceni	22,768	6,518	28.63%	16,250	71.37%
Cahul	38,419	16,830	43.81%	21,589	56.19%
Cantemir	17,101	9,129	53.38%	7,972	46.62%
Călărași	22,925	13,860	60.46%	9,065	39.54%
Căușeni	27,868	13,928	49.98%	13,940	50.02%
Chișinău	348,707	195,227	56.00%	153,430	44.00%
Cimișlia	18,100	9,033	49.91%	9,067	50.09%
Criuleni	27,332	16,453	60.20%	10,879	39.80%
Dondușeni	13,852	3,762	27.16%	10,090	72.84%
Drochia	28,348	9,275	32.72%	19,073	67.28%
Dubăsari	11,735	4,818	41.06%	6,917	58.94%
Edineț	26,083	7,758	29.74%	18,325	70.26%
Fălești	30,570	10,239	33.49%	20,331	66.51%
Florești	29,035	10,917	37.60%	18,118	62.40%
Găgăuzia	57,847	2,985	5.16%	54,862	94.84%
Glodeni	18,659	6,293	33.73%	12,366	66.27%
Hîncești	35,665	20,992	58.86%	14,673	41.14%
Ialoveni	38,480	26,050	67.70%	12,430	32.30%
Left Bank of the Dniester	15,526	4,816	31.02%	10,710	68.98%
Leova	15,782	7,769	49.23%	8,013	50.77%
Nisporeni	19,787	11,889	60.08%	7,898	39.92%
Ocnița	17,224	3,627	21.06%	13,597	78.94%
Orhei	42,508	19,760	46.49%	22,748	53.51%
Rezina	16,151	7,888	48.84%	8,263	51.16%
Rîșcani	22,180	7,123	32.11%	15,057	67.89%
Sîngerei	28,003	11,244	40.15%	16,759	59.85%
Soroca	32,621	12,415	38.06%	20,206	61.94%
Strășeni	32,105	20,023	62.37%	12,082	37.63%
Șoldănești	13,322	5,661	42.49%	7,661	57.51%
Ștefan Vodă	22,104	10,567	47.81%	11,537	52.19%
Taraclia	15,799	1,258	7.96%	14,541	92.04%
Telenești	22,167	12,693	57.26%	9,474	42.74%
Ungheni	37,819	16,355	43.25%	21,464	56.75%
Votes from abroad	235,503	180,836	76.79%	54,667	23.21%
Total	1,488,874	749,719	50.35%	739,155	49.65%

== Aftermath ==
Analysts said ballots from the largely pro-EU diaspora were counted towards the end, giving the "yes" campaign a last-moment push. The "yes" option was selected by 45.38% of voters living in Moldova and 76.96% of Moldovan citizens living or being placed abroad. As 54.62% of voters residing permanently in Moldova voted "no", the voters living abroad were ultimately decisive.

=== Instances of vote buying ===
President Sandu attributed the close result of the referendum to foreign interference and described it as an "unprecedented assault on democracy", adding that her government had evidence that 150,000 votes had been bought, with a goal by criminal entities of 300,000 votes. The European Union also said that the two exercises had taken place "under unprecedented interference and intimidation by Russia and its proxies".

Earlier in the year, an investigation conducted by the newspaper Ziarul de Gardă revealed the existence of a criminal enterprise headed by Ilan Shor, which received $15 million from the Russian government (the admissions were recorded on camera); those funds were then distributed to around 130,000 people in order to bribe voters and spread disinformation against the European Union. Russia denied the accusations.

A BBC producer at a polling station in Transnistria found evidence of vote buying, with a first-hand account of a woman asking an election monitor where she could collect the cash promised to her in exchange for her vote while refusing to tell what her vote was. The election monitor Promolex also noted instances at polling stations in Russia in which voters allegedly received white jackets emblazoned with the words "Russia/Moldova" as well as invitations to restaurants and internet cards as voting benefits.

Four hundred Moldovan citizens were investigated for allegedly receiving money to choose the "no" option in the referendum and vote for a determined candidate in the presidential election. Those found guilty would have been fined 37,000 Moldovan lei (over €1,900 or US$2,100 as of 2024), but were given the option of not receiving punishment if they cooperated with the authorities.

The head of the Moldovan Police, Viorel Cernăuțeanu, stated on 24 October that since September, a total of $39 million, including 15 million that month and 24 million in October, had been transferred to over 138,000 people in Moldova through the Russian bank Promsvyazbank, which is banned in Moldova. He added that the number of people that had benefited from this system would be much greater as they would have received money not only for themselves but also for members of their family. This money transfer system was believed to have started in late spring, and was carried out through applications that people downloaded with instructions from interactive chatbots on Telegram. This allowed them to enter the system and benefit from transfers from the bank. Cernăuțeanu stated that Moldovan police had documented and stopped the activity of such bots in 97 Telegram groups.

A later national poll showed that 74.7% of respondents knew people who had received benefits, material or financial, for their vote. The poll had 1,031 respondents and was conducted by the Moldova State University's Centre of Political and Administrative Studies in partnership with the Black Sea Trust for Regional Cooperation.

=== International reactions ===
The European Union welcomed the results and condemned the alleged "unprecedented malign interference by Russia". European Commission President Ursula von der Leyen praised the referendum result, saying that "In the face of Russia's hybrid tactics, Moldova shows that it is independent, it is strong and it wants a European future!", while the United States also noted Russian attempts to "undermine Moldova's election and its European integration". Meanwhile, the Kremlin expressed doubt on how the 'Yes' vote narrowly won and reiterated its denial of allegations of interference.

The Organization for Security and Co-operation in Europe observer team said in a statement that the constitutional referendum was well-managed and contestants campaigned freely in an environment characterized by concerns of illicit foreign interference and active disinformation efforts. While this affected the integrity of the process, campaign conditions did not allow for a level playing field among contestants, as the media coverage favoured the incumbent and the government and there was misuse of public resources. OSCE stated that "the election administration worked professionally and demonstrated impartiality in their decision-making", and special co-ordinator Lucie Potůčková praised the country "for implementing a number of reforms to increase public confidence in the electoral system, in the context of heavy Russian propaganda. From implementing cybersecurity measures to ensuring a high degree of women's participation, there is much to celebrate in this election".

On 6 November, the Russian foreign ministry summoned Moldovan ambassador Lilian Darius to complain about Moldova barring eight Russian election observers from entering the country to monitor the referendum and presidential elections. On 12 November, the Moldovan government served a note to the Russian ambassador Oleg Ozerov formally complaining about Moscow's interference.

=== Domestic reactions ===
Former foreign minister Nicu Popescu praised the victory of the "yes" side and said that "even a marginal victory is still a victory", in the context of the narrow result in favour of EU integration.

In a statement on 24 October, Sandu stated that, despite the instances of vote buying, she had rejected suggestions of annulling and repeating the elections as "no one has the right to deny citizens a massive, honest and free expression of their will". She further stated that, without the buying of votes, "we would have had a clear victory for both the presidential elections and the referendum", and also urged the Moldovan judiciary to "wake up" and address the issue of electoral bribery.

== See also ==
- Moldova–European Union relations
- 2016 United Kingdom European Union membership referendum
