= 2023 Moldovan local elections =

Local elections were held in Moldova on 5 November 2023, with a runoff round for mayors held two weeks after the first round on 19 November 2023. The main electoral contenders were the incumbent government, the pro-European, Atlanticist, centre-right and liberal Party of Action and Solidarity (PAS); and opposition from the left-wing, socially conservative and pro-Russian Bloc of Communists and Socialists (BECS), comprising the Party of Socialists of the Republic of Moldova (PSRM), and Party of Communists of the Republic of Moldova (PCRM). The elections were organized by the incumbent Recean Cabinet. Overall, the PAS won the most votes in the elections.

The elections were affected by Russian meddling, with Moldovan intelligence chief Alexandru Musteață claiming that Russia had allocated around one billion Moldovan lei (around 55.5 million dollars) to overthrow Moldova's democratic government and destabilize the country. Parties linked to Ilan Shor, a Moldovan pro-Russian fugitive oligarch, whose Șor Party had been declared unconstitutional four months before the elections, were allegedly involved in vote buying and in the reception of illegal financing from Russia, with the Chance party being barred from running only days before the first round as a result.

== Background ==
In 2019, the Party of Socialists of the Republic of Moldova (PSRM) won 17 out of 32 administrative districts, as per the electoral results of the previous Moldovan local elections, which were held in 2019. Following that 2019 election, the Party of Action and Solidarity (PAS) controlled a single district, won as part of the ACUM political alliance with the Dignity and Truth Platform (PPDA), the Liberal Democratic Party of Moldova (PLDM), and the National Unity Party (PUN).

In 2021, government began considering reform of administrative districts. Former Prime Minister Natalia Gavrilița (PAS) announced in 2023 that fundamental local government reform would not take place until the elections, but that "voluntary amalgamation" could be implemented, i.e. the voluntary union of several administrative-territorial units.

In February 2023, there were allegations of a Russian-backed attempted coup in Moldova.

== Irregularities and alleged Russian interference ==
On 19 June 2023, the Șor Party was declared unconstitutional by the Constitutional Court of Moldova. Moldovan pro-Russian fugitive oligarch Ilan Shor was banned, as were other Șor Party politicians, from standing for election for five years. In August 2023, former journalist Alexei Lungu became the leader of Chance, a party that affiliated with Shor. Chance's candidates were banned from the elections only days before their first round amid claims of corrupting voters and accepting funding from Russia. This resulted in a blanket ban on all 8,605 candidates nominated by the party. Intelligence chief Alexandru Musteață claimed that Russia spent about a billion Moldovan lei (roughly US$55.5 million), routed through Shor, to overthrow the democratic government and destabilize Moldova, with Chance allegedly using around 10% of this sum in the prior two months to bribe voters and illegally finance the political party associated with Shor.

As reported by the East StratCom Task Force's EUvsDisinfo project, for the Moldovan local elections, pro-Russian and disinformation sources attempted to discredit the pro-European authorities and candidates as well as Moldova's development partners and employed accusations of Russophobia as a tool of propaganda and disinformation. Balkan Insight described the elections as dominated by Russian interference through parties funded by Shor and Vladimir Plahotniuc, another Moldovan fugitive oligarch, in the context of a "hybrid war" that Russia was said to be waging against Moldova and its pro-Western government at the time. Such latter stance was held by the Moldovan authorities; the SIS published a report on 3 November which alleged that Russia sought to "influence the electoral process" through the Chance party and which Moldovan associate professor at the Oakland University Cristian Cantir stated it contained "a lot of evidence suggesting that Shor in particular has been working with the Kremlin" to undermine the elections.

Amid the disinformation campaigns and the vote buying efforts by Shor-linked parties, the Moldovan authorities applied more drastic measures a few days before the elections. In late October, the Security and Intelligence Service of Moldova (SIS) blocked 22 Russian-language websites (including Interfax, Izvestia, Komsomolskaya Pravda, Radio Sputnik and TASS) for spreading information from the authorities of an aggressor state (Russia) in a military conflict, followed by the suspension of six TV stations linked to Shor and Plahotniuc.

== Mayoral results ==
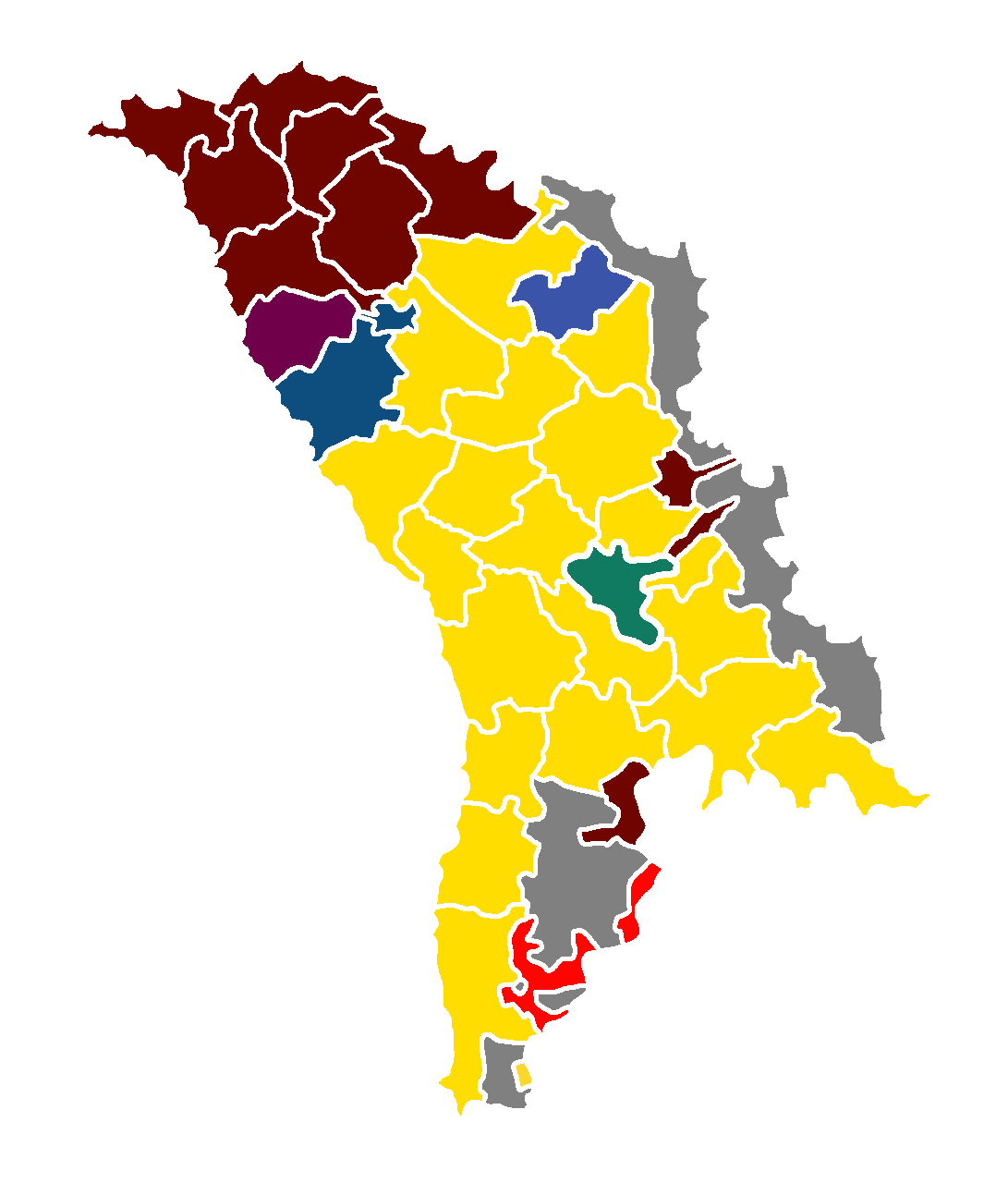
Electoral map depicting the results of the 2023 Moldovan local elections by each administrative unit of the country, i.e. raion.

After the first round of voting and the 273 runoff votes on 19 November:

- 898 mayoral positions were contested
- In Chișinău, incumbent mayor Ion Ceban was re-elected
- Bălți went to Alexandr Petkov

Party	District and municipal councils			Town and village councils			Mayoral		
Party	Votes	%	Seats	Votes	%	Seats	Votes	%	Seats
Party of Action and Solidarity	305,077	29.69	357	235,149	28.26	3,189	329,132	27.31	291
Party of Socialists of the Republic of Moldova	184,089	17.92	256	160,312	19.26	2,282	147,693	12.25	145
National Alternative Movement	85,553	8.33	20	13,497	1.62	92	143,626	11.92	5
European Social Democratic Party	65,585	6.38	88	68,410	8.22	1,018	72,310	6.00	103
Party of Communists of the Republic of Moldova	47,184	4.59	48	20,350	2.45	199	13,549	1.12	7
Party of Development and Consolidation of Moldova	45,453	4.42	57	43,446	5.22	573	48,995	4.06	48
Our Party	36,610	3.56	44	20,641	2.48	188	32,309	2.68	17
Liberal Democratic Party of Moldova	36,401	3.54	41	34,651	4.16	419	36,086	2.99	34
Dignity and Truth Platform	34,558	3.36	39	28,828	3.46	308	40,690	3.38	20
Revival Party	30,655	2.98	35	27,318	3.28	305	30,103	2.50	27
League of Cities and Communes	17,446	1.70	22	18,789	2.26	192	22,324	1.85	16
Party of Change	14,482	1.41	10	10,320	1.24	112	17,965	1.49	7
Coalition for Unity and Welfare	14,212	1.38	10	13,942	1.68	125	18,070	1.50	10
Alternative and Salvation Force of Moldova	13,813	1.34	14	6,285	0.76	21	8,335	0.69	3
Respect Moldova Movement	12,657	1.23	11	10,191	1.22	147	12,607	1.05	19
Democracy at Home Party	10,705	1.04	5	5,000	0.60	53	9,270	0.77	2
Modern Democratic Party	6,767	0.66	8	7,183	0.86	124	5,847	0.49	14
Alliance of Liberals and Democrats for Europe	5,626	0.55	2	5,444	0.65	57	6,628	0.55	4
Liberal Party	3,833	0.37	1	3,453	0.41	31	4,350	0.36	3
Ruslan Codreanu Electoral Bloc	3,454	0.34	–	464	0.06	3	4,389	0.36	–
National Liberal Party	2,921	0.28	1	2,465	0.30	15	2,382	0.20	2
People's Will Party	2,215	0.22	1	3,076	0.37	22	4,975	0.41	1
Common Action Party – Civil Congress	2,518	0.25	–	1,363	0.16	12	1,982	0.16	1
We Build Europe at Home Party	2,467	0.24	–	607	0.07	4	1,174	0.10	–
Party for People, Nature, and Animals	1,620	0.16	–	50	0.01	—	71	0.01	–
Ecologist Green Party	823	0.08	–	801	0.10	7	1,028	0.09	1
National Moldovan Party	623	0.06	–	181	0.02	1	1,088	0.09	–
Patriots of Moldova	606	0.06	–	1,253	0.15	11	293	0.02	–
European People's Party of Moldova	510	0.05	–	307	0.04	3	294	0.02	–
Movement of Professionals "Speranța-Nadejda"	501	0.05	–	235	0.03	4	794	0.07	–
NOI Party	335	0.03	–	416	0.05	3	588	0.05	–
Our Bugeac Party	–	–	–	3,489	0.42	19	36	0.00	–
National Progress Party	–	–	–	302	0.04	3	80	0.01	–
People's Party of the Republic of Moldova	–	–	–	415	0.05	2	110	0.01	–
New Historical Option	–	–	–	–	–	–	81	0.01	–
Independents	38,031	3.70	16	83,535	10.04	449	132,659	11.01	116
Valid votes	1,027,421	93.71	–	832,168	92.65	–	1,151,895	95.56	–
Invalid/blank votes	69,007	6.29	–	65,975	7.35	–	53,455	4.44	–
Total votes	1,096,428	100.00	1,086	898,143	100.00	9,972	1,205,350	100.00	898
Registered voters/turnout	2,642,340	41.49	–	2,140,523	41.96	–	2,892,378	41.67	–
Source:cec.md

On 22 November 2023, the Central Electoral Commission of Moldova (CEC) ruled three settlements would hold new elections in May 2024.

== Election results in Chișinău ==
=== Chișinău Mayor ===
Candidate	Party	Votes	%
Ion Ceban (incumbent)	National Alternative Movement	132,803	50.62
Lilian Carp	Party of Action and Solidarity	74,074	28.23
Adrian Albu	Party of Socialists of the Republic of Moldova	11,876	4.53
Victor Chironda	Dignity and Truth Platform	10,011	3.82
Vasile Bolea	Revival Party	6,334	2.41
Vasile Costiuc	Democracy at Home Party	5,518	2.10
Diana Caraman	Party of Communists of the Republic of Moldova	4,456	1.70
Ruslan Codreanu	Ruslan Codreanu Electoral Bloc	3,685	1.40
Others	Other parties and independents	13,596	5.18
Total		262,353	100.00
Source: Central Electoral Commission

=== Chișinău City Council ===
Party	Votes	%	Seats
National Alternative Movement	85,553	33.25	20
Party of Action and Solidarity	84,615	32.88	20
Party of Socialists of the Republic of Moldova	24,816	9.64	6
Party of Communists of the Republic of Moldova	11,465	4.46	2
Revival Party	6,793	2.64	1
Dignity and Truth Platform	6,583	2.56	1
Our Party	4,429	1.72	1
Democracy at Home Party	3,583	1.39	0
Ruslan Codreanu Electoral Bloc	3,454	1.34	0
Party of Development and Consolidation of Moldova	3,122	1.21	0
Coalition for Unity and Welfare	2,415	0.94	0
Party of Change	1,961	0.76	0
We Build Europe at Home Party	1,865	0.72	0
Respect Moldova Movement	1,758	0.68	0
For People, Nature and Animals	1,620	0.63	0
Liberal Democratic Party of Moldova	1,539	0.60	0
European Social Democratic Party	1,505	0.58	0
Liberal Party	783	0.30	0
Common Action Party – Civil Congress	693	0.27	0
National Moldovan Party	623	0.24	0
People's Will	617	0.24	0
Alliance of Liberals and Democrats for Europe	580	0.23	0
Movement of Professionals "Speranța-Nadejda"	501	0.19	0
Alternative and Salvation Force of Moldova	472	0.18	0
Patriots of Moldova	441	0.17	0
National Liberal Party	365	0.14	0
Ecologist Green Party	334	0.13	0
League of Cities and Communes	276	0.11	0
NOI	218	0.08	0
Independents	4,328	1.68	0
Total	257,307	100.00	51
Source: Central Electoral Commission

== External observers ==
Moldova's CEC accredited 401 international observers for the election. The Organization for Security and Co-operation in Europe (OSCE) was an observer organization, with 264 observers from 36 countries. Their opinion on the election was that: "The elections were calm and efficiently managed with candidates mostly able to campaign freely, but the broad powers of the government commission for exceptional situations were used to restrict freedom of speech and association as well as the right to stand, while interference from abroad and widespread allegations of vote buying throughout the campaign were of concern".

The 5 November local elections were peaceful and managed efficiently, reported OSCE, but noted that interference from abroad and restrictive measures imposed due to national security concerns had a negative impact on the process. Observers noted credible, persistent, and widespread allegations of the use of illegal funds for vote buying, linked to the leader of the dissolved Șor Party, and the use of foreign private sponsorship to fund local infrastructure projects in some districts, to gain votes.

== Post-election events ==
An appeal to the Chișinău Court of Appeal after the local elections by the Chance party in December 2023 led to a reversal of the ban of 600 candidates removed from the November ballot. This lifting of the ban was reversed on 4 October 2023 by the Exceptional Situations Committee, which stated that any former member of the Șor party who had been charged, indicted, or under suspicion of committing criminal acts would be banned from participating in the elections. The bans on 21 candidates were amended on 4 October 2023 to a prohibition on running for three years.
