= Alexei Lungu =

Moldovan politician and journalist

President of the Chance Political Party
- Incumbent
- Assumed office Early August 2023
- Preceded by: Olga Ursatîi

Mayor of Orhei
- Acting
- In office 12 September – 19 November 2023
- Preceded by: Pavel Verejanu
- Succeeded by: Tatiana Cociu

Deputy Mayor of Orhei
- In office 8 September – 12 September 2023
- Mayor: Pavel Verejanu

Personal details
- Born: 19 November 1983 (age 42) Chișinău, Moldavian SSR, Soviet Union (now Moldova)
- Citizenship: Moldova; Romania
- Party: Chance (2023–present)
- Occupation: Politician, formerly journalist

Alexei Lungu (born 19 November 1983) is a Moldovan politician and journalist. For years, he worked as a journalist, moderator and television presenter at media groups and TV channels affiliated to Moldovan oligarchs Vladimir Plahotniuc and Ilan Shor, as well as to former President of Moldova Igor Dodon. Lungu was also a contributor at the Russian state-owned media group Rossiya Segodnya, publishing over 100 news articles at Sputnik's Moldovan branch website. All TV channels in which Lungu worked were over time sanctioned by the Moldovan authorities, even having their broadcast licenses suspended.

Lungu joined politics in 2023, becoming the president of the pro-Russian Shor-affiliated party Chance in early August. He was appointed deputy mayor of Orhei from 8 to 12 September and the town's acting mayor thereafter, running for mayor at the 2023 Moldovan local elections but being excluded due to Chance's use of illegal funding from Russia. Lungu attended and led many protests organized by Shor's group, with Chance being part of political blocs affiliated with him. Lungu supported Moldova's accession to the Eurasian Economic Union (EEU) and BRICS, and was critical of the European Union (EU), NATO, the then ruling pro-European Party of Action and Solidarity (PAS) and Romania, of which he was a citizen as of 2025.

Lungu has been publicly known for his confrontational and aggressive behaviour, having been involved in multiple conflicts with law enforcement and in acts of intimidation against journalists and media outlets. As of 2025, he was a suspect in a criminal case of illegal party financing. Due to his proximity to Shor, Lungu is subject to sanctions in Moldova, the EU and Switzerland, and in Canada for involvement in Russian interference activities before the 2025 Moldovan parliamentary election.

== Biography ==
=== Journalist career ===
Alexei Lungu was born on 19 November 1983 in Chișinău, in the Moldavian SSR of the Soviet Union (now Moldova). As of 2025, he was also a citizen of Romania, having obtained citizenship a few years earlier through reacquisition, a process that allowed Moldovan citizens to reclaim it by proving Romanian descent. As of that year, Lungu was married to Diana Spătărel.

Lungu is a journalist by profession, having experience in moderating political television programs. He worked for ten years in the media group General Media Group, at the television channels Publika TV and later Prime, during the time in which the group was controlled by Moldovan oligarch and politician Vladimir Plahotniuc. While he was a presenter at Prime, he provided consultancy services to the National Health Insurance Company (CNAM), then led by Plahotniuc affiliate Tamara Andrușca, for one month in spring 2019. Lungu ended his activities at General Media Group in 2019, shortly after Plahotniuc left Moldova.

In late 2019, Lungu became a contributor at Rossiya Segodnya, a Russian government-owned media group. During his two months working at the group, he published over 100 news articles on the Moldovan branch website of Sputnik, a Russian state-owned news agency; Sputnik Moldova was blocked by the Security and Intelligence Service of Moldova (SIS) immediately after the Russian invasion of Ukraine in February 2022, as it "promotes information that incites hatred and war".

Lungu also worked at Accent TV, a TV channel owned by SRL Exclusiv Media, affiliated with the Party of Socialists of the Republic of Moldova (PSRM) and former President of Moldova Igor Dodon and later taken by Moldovan pro-Russian fugitive oligarch Ilan Shor. Accent TV, along with five other TV channels, saw later their broadcast licenses suspended on 16 December 2022 by Moldova's Commission for Exceptional Situations (CSE) due to "the lack of accurate information in the coverage of national events, as well as the war in Ukraine". Lungu joined the media group affiliated with Shor in 2022, moderating the program PULS on the Shor-affiliated channel Orizont TV until recently as of the moment he entered politics. He with his program had migrated to Orizont TV from TV6, which was among the six aforementioned suspended TV channels. Orizont TV, but also Prime, Publika TV and another three channels, would later also have their licenses suspended by the CSE on 30 October 2023, as they were financed illegally and produced propaganda and disinformation as then Moldovan president Maia Sandu declared.

According to the Moldovan newspaper Ziarul de Gardă, all TV channels in which Lungu worked were over time sanctioned by Moldova's Audiovisual Council (CA) and accused of political partisanship by media experts. Lungu and other representatives of the channels suspended in December 2022 organized a protest against the CSE's "abusive" and "illegal" decision at the Free Press Square in Bucharest, Romania, on 25 January 2023.

=== Political career ===
On 7 August 2023, Ziarul de Gardă reported that Lungu had become the president of the pro-Russian party Chance. At the time, this had not been announced publicly by him nor by the party, but it could be verified on the website of the Public Services Agency (ASP). Chance had been registered as a party in 2021 by its leader Mihail Ahremțev, originally under the name Ours, and it was led by Olga Ursatîi for a few days before Lungu took over. In a subsequent press conference, Lungu announced that he had resigned from his profession as journalist and declared that he would become the new leader of the party. Furthermore, Pavel Verejanu, then mayor of the town of Orhei, announced at the same press conference that Shor's team would support Chance.

On 8 September that year, Lungu was unanimously elected deputy mayor of Orhei by the present municipal councillors, who were Shor affiliates. Lungu was proposed by Verejanu, who had been elected mayor of Orhei in the 2019 Moldovan local elections as a candidate of the Șor Party. Led by Shor, this party had been outlawed in summer 2023 by the Constitutional Court of Moldova, as it had "acted in contradiction" to the principles of the state of law and "endangered the sovereignty and independence" of Moldova. Lungu was appointed acting mayor of Orhei shortly after on 12 September. Verejanu did not explain why did he resign; he had already joined by then as an advisor the team of then Governor of Gagauzia Evghenia Guțul, who had also been elected as a Șor Party candidate.

Lungu attempted to run at the 2023 Moldovan local elections to become mayor of Orhei, but the Chance party, of which he registered as a candidate, was barred from the elections just two days before they took place due to the party receiving illegal funding from Russia, with all the party's candidates being excluded from the race. In Orhei won instead Tatiana Cociu, of the party Alternative and Salvation Force of Moldova (FASM), in the first round on 5 November, having been supported by Shor as well as by Lungu himself after his exclusion.

Chance and the FASM composed the Chance. Duties. Realization. (abbreviated ȘOR in Romanian) political bloc, led by Shor and established by him in June 2023, just a week after the Șor Party was declared unconstitutional, with Chance renaming from Ours shortly after. Chance later became part of the Victory bloc, composed by four Shor-controlled parties, the other three being the FASM, Revival and Victory. The bloc was led by Shor and established after he summoned the parties in Moscow, Russia, in April 2024. Lungu was described by RISE Moldova and Ziarul de Gardă as having led many protests organized by Shor, and he was present in "almost all" such protests according to Evenimentul Zilei. According to alleged leaked documents from Shor's organized group, analyzed by Ziarul de Gardă in October 2025, Lungu was the employee of the group's central office with the highest salary, purportedly 150,000 Moldovan lei a month.

On 6 February 2025, the Central Electoral Commission of Moldova (CEC) requested Moldova's Ministry of Justice to begin legal proceedings to dissolve Chance, as the party had continually failed to present the original declarations on its donors and its list of members, impeding administrative auditing of its finances. In reaction, the next day, Lungu and Chance supporters carried out a flash mob in front of the CEC's headquarters "against the anti-democratic decisions of the CEC" as Lungu stated, with him claiming that "the 2023 team of the Chance party is subject to political repression".

Lungu promoted the idea of Moldova joining the Eurasian Economic Union (EEU) and BRICS, stating that this would "open colossal prospects for Moldova". Moldovan newspaper Timpul de dimineață described Lungu as known for his harsh rhetoric against the European Union (EU), NATO and the pro-European government ruling Moldova at the time, employing a discourse often in tune with Russian propaganda. According to Moldovan political analyst Ion Tăbârță, Lungu actively promoted anti-Romanian and pro-Russian narratives and a discourse opposing Moldova's pro-European government of that time.

== Controversies ==
=== Conflicts with law enforcement ===
According to the Center for Investigative Journalism of Moldova, Lungu is known for his altercations with law enforcement. Romanian newspaper Evenimentul Zilei stated that, after taking leadership of Chance, Lungu had presented himself as an aggressive character, being a center of attention at protests organized by Shor's group for his provocative actions. According to the newspaper, Lungu attempted to instigate provocations every time he made a public appearance, insulting journalists and law enforcement officers, and once his provocations led to altercations, he would "play the victim".

After returning from a 27–28 May 2024 BRICS economic forum in Moscow, Lungu was retained and checked for three hours at the Chișinău Eugen Doga International Airport to ensure that he was not in possession of "prohibited objects" as a Moldovan Border Police officer stated; Lungu stated the authorities had refused to give him official explanations for his retention and that he would file a legal complaint. On 14 June that year, at the Stephen the Great Central Park in Chișinău, Lungu snatched identification documents belonging to individuals undergoing ID verification at that moment from the hand of a Moldovan Police officer. His lawyer protested that he suffered abuse; Lungu ended up receiving a 1,200 lei fine.

On 27 March 2025, the National Anti-Corruption Center (CNA) summoned Lungu at the CNA's headquarters the next day to notify him that he was a suspect in a criminal case of illegal party financing. He received the summoning at the Chișinău airport, as he was trying to fly to Istanbul, Turkey, not being able to leave Moldova after receiving it. Lungu denied being under accusation and claimed that the situation was due to some inconsistencies in some documents invoked by the CEC, which he accused of favoring the "PAS criminal group", the Party of Action and Solidarity (PAS) being the ruling party at the time.

On 19 July that year, during a meeting in which the CEC rejected the Victory bloc's registration for the 2025 Moldovan parliamentary election of 28 September, Lungu was taken out of the room by police at the request of CEC members. On 23 July, Lungu had a confrontation with police outside the Chișinău Court of Appeal, being detained and refusing to enter a police car. After reporting feeling unwell and calling an ambulance, Lungu refused to cooperate with law enforcement at the hospital, and an investigation was opened against him for insulting law enforcement and disorderly conduct. A separate investigation for the obstruction of police activity was opened for Lungu's bodyguard, who was formerly a carabinier. On his use of bodyguards, Evenimentul Zilei reported on 7 September that year that Lungu had been seen in recent days with two of them. Lungu was involved in clashes on 31 August in the village of Peresecina, with a video shared on social media showing him pushing people at a political rally. The clashes took place after a PAS rally was attended by a group associated with Shor's criminal group according to police, descending afterwards into aggression and violent behavior, including against police officers, and resulting in several people being processed by police.

=== Intimidation against journalists ===
On 1 July 2025, during a hearing of a criminal case against Gagauzia's governor Guțul at the Buiucani Courthouse in Chișinău, Ziarul de Gardă journalist Măriuța Nistor was intimidated and threatened by Lungu with the opening of a criminal case against her over "forgery and use of forgery". A similar incident occurred earlier that same day and place against TVR Moldova journalist Angelica Ungureanu. Furthermore, the Moldovan NGO Promo-LEX reported that, on 24 August, a member of its observer mission was intimidated and verbally attacked by Lungu during a public event in Orhei, stating that the affected observer had filed a complaint to the police.

Between May and 21 July 2025, as reported by Romanian news site Veridica's Moldovan edition, the CA received around 30 SLAPP lawsuits, signed by Lungu and former journalist Valeriu Reniță, against moderators of several evening political talk shows on the TV channels Jurnal TV, Moldova 1, ProTV Chișinău, TV8 and TVR Moldova. The lawsuits' aim was to intimidate said moderators and TV channels, according to Veridica.md. Association of Independent Press (API) director Petru Macovei linked such behaviors like Lungu's, undertaken "specially by those from pro-Russian parties", to journalistic efforts to publish and reveal illegal actions and Russian influence activities in Moldova.

=== Domestic and international sanctions ===
On 6 June 2024, Moldovan TV channel TV8 reported that the Facebook pages of Lungu, Shor, Guțul and Marina Tauber had been blocked and were no longer accessible on the platform. SIS representatives told TV8 that it had informed Facebook's owner Meta since 2023 that these people "affiliated with the Russian factor" were using their pages to promote disinformation and propaganda.

On 25 April 2025, Lungu's Romanian identity card was annulled, something he only discovered in early May, when he was not allowed to fly from the Iași International Airport to Istanbul. This was after police officers of Romania's Ministry of Internal Affairs verified that many other Moldovans were also registered at Lungu's address in Romania. As reported by Romanian newspaper Adevărul, such situations were common due to intermediaries identifying formal addresses for Moldovans with reacquired Romanian citizenship in exchange for money, as they required an address in Romania to receive a Romanian ID card. Lungu had presented his Romanian ID card upon his return on 28 May 2024 from the economic forum in Moscow. Tăbârță suggested that the real reason for the annulment could have been Lungu's anti-Romanian, pro-Russian and anti-PAS narratives, analogous to those promoted by Shor. He also stated that the Romanian special services could have more information on possible actions by Lungu "against the Romanian state" and "public order", resulting in this decision; and that the annulment could have been a signal to other pro-Russian Moldovan politicians with Romanian citizenship.

On 15 July that year, Lungu among others was included in the EU's list of sanctioned Moldovan politicians and entities close to Shor; they were deemed responsible for actions aimed at destabilizing or threatening Moldova's sovereignty and independence. Due to the sanctions, Lungu would no longer be able to travel to the EU, and any of his assets within EU member states would be blocked. On 25 July, Lungu and most of the previous individuals and entities were included in the Moldovan authorities' sanctions list by Moldova's Interinstitutional Supervisory Council, headed by Prime Minister Dorin Recean, as they "help Shor bring disorder and destabilization to our country" as Recean stated, resulting in their bank accounts being blocked.

Switzerland joined the EU's 15 July sanctions against Lungu and the rest on 12 August. Canada followed suit on 28 August after it imposed sanctions against Lungu, 15 other individuals and two entities in Moldova as they were accused of involvement in actions of Russian interference before Moldova's 2025 parliamentary election, meaning that Lungu and the others would be unable to enter Canada, their assets in the country would be blocked and any financial transactions with them would be prohibited.
