= Victory (political bloc) =

Pro-Russia political bloc in Moldova

Victory Победа – Victorie
- Leader: Ilan Shor
- Executive Secretary of the National Political Council: Evghenia Guțul
- Executive Committee Secretary: Marina Tauber
- Parliamentary leader: Vasile Bolea
- Founder: Ilan Shor
- Founded: 21 April 2024
- Preceded by: Chance. Duties. Realization. (de facto)
- Ideology: Russophilia; Moldovenism; Populism; Social conservatism Eurasianism; Hard Euroscepticism; Moldova–Russia unionism
- Political position: Left-wing
- Bloc members: Revival (PR); Chance (PPȘ); Alternative and Salvation Force of Moldova (FASM); Victory (PPV)
- Colours: Red; Yellow
- Parliament (Note: Since 5 deputies of the Șor Party were legally banned from joining other formations, they sit de jure as independents.): 0 / 101
- District Presidents: 0 / 32

Victory (Romanian: Victorie, Russian: Победа, romanized: Pobeda, stylised as Pobeda – Victorie) is a pro-Russian political bloc in Moldova, established by the fugitive oligarch Ilan Shor and his allied parties in Moscow, Russia, on 21 April 2024.

Shor has stated that he believes "the only salvation" for Moldova is "union with the Russian Federation" and that "it makes no sense to talk about the country's independence".

== History ==
The Victory bloc was officially founded by Ilan Shor on 21 April 2024 in Moscow, Russia, at a meeting at the Carlton Hotel. In addition to Shor, the agreement to create the bloc was signed by the Governor of Gagauzia Evghenia Guțul, as well as the leaders of the Revival (PR), Chance (PPȘ), Alternative and Salvation Force of Moldova (FASM) and Victory (PPV) parties. The meeting could not be held in Moldova because Shor is a fugitive who lived in Russia at the time. The Victory party, which shared the same name as the bloc, was founded in January 2024. Ilan Shor became the chairman of the bloc, Evghenia Guțul was elected executive secretary of the national political council, and MP Marina Tauber was elected secretary of the executive committee. According to the organizers and participants, this event was held in Russia because the opposition is persecuted in Moldova and arrests and searches are used against its activists and leaders. The Russian press called the meeting "a congress of Moldovan politicians who support Chișinău's accession to the EAEU", and Ilan Shor described the meeting on his social networks as "the unification of the Moldovan opposition". The meeting ended with a performance by Russian pop singers Nikolay Baskov and Philipp Kirkorov.

Evghenia Guțul stated that the Victory bloc will nominate its single candidate for the 2024 Moldovan presidential election. Guțul herself refused to run for president, stating that she is not of the right age, since one must be 40 years old to run. The bloc's likely goal in the presidential election could also be to gain enough votes to negotiate a political majority with the Party of Socialists of the Republic of Moldova (PSRM) and oust the Party of Action and Solidarity (PAS) from power.

On 9 May 2024, the bloc's leaders took part in a march in Chișinău on the anniversary of the victory over Nazi Germany. The PSRM, which organized the demonstration, forbade the bloc's leaders from joining their column.

On 9 June 2024, the second congress of the Victory bloc leaders was held in Moscow. At this congress, the bloc's participation in the presidential election and the 2024 Moldovan European Union membership constitutional referendum was discussed. Ilan Shor said he is confident that the Victory bloc will be able to defeat Moldovan President Maia Sandu in the presidential election and will "use any necessary methods" to achieve this goal and free Moldova from the "pro-European bandits". Shor said that the only way to "revive Moldova" is for Moldova to join the Eurasian Economic Union (EAEU). The leader of the parliamentary group of the Victory bloc, Vasile Bolea, said that the bloc would resist Moldova's turning away from Russia. Evghenia Guțul said that the Victory bloc held its congress in Russia because the Moldovan government was threatening Moldovan oppositionists, and said that Moldova would be drawn into the war in Ukraine if Moldovans voted to join the EU. A few days before the bloc's congress, its leaders took part in the St. Petersburg International Economic Forum, which took place from 5 to 8 June 2024, and discussed the political situation in Moldova with Russian politicians such as Sergey Lavrov, Nikolai Valuev, Yevgeny Primakov Jr., Rustam Minnikhanov, Alexander Beglov and propagandists like Margarita Simonyan.

On 7 August 2024 the Central Electoral Commission of Moldova forbade the recognition and certification of the Victory bloc in the concurrent 20 October 2024 Moldovan presidential election and 2024 Moldovan European Union membership constitutional referendum.

In a congress of Victory held in Moscow on 6 July 2025, Shor stated that he wanted Gagauz governor Guțul to head the party's electoral list for the 2025 Moldovan parliamentary election. At the moment, Guțul was being investigated for two criminal cases and was under house arrest.

== Platform ==
The Victory bloc consists of pro-Russian, eurosceptic, and nationalist parties that oppose Moldova's alignment with the West. The electoral bloc opposes European integration of Moldova, and runs on a "No to the EU" slogan. Instead of the European Union, Victory is advocating Moldovian accession to the Eurasian Economic Union instead. It also seeks to protect Moldova’s “national interests and sovereignty” against “external control” by the “collective West,” and to transform Moldova into a federation that would include Russian-speaking federal units in Gagauzia and Transnistria, with the latter to be reintegrated into Moldova through Russian mediation. The bloc is described as populist.

In a 6 July 2025 congress of Victory held in Moscow, Shor stated that he believed "the only salvation" for Moldova was "union with the Russian Federation" through a "strong, stable and durable" union. He stated that "it makes no sense to talk about the country's independence", adding the comment "one currency, one parliament". Shor justified himself by stating that "all the resources for the development of Moldova reside in the Russian Federation" and that both peoples share "the same cultural code".

== Reception ==
The Minister of Infrastructure and Regional Development of Moldova, Andrei Spînu, responded to the creation of the bloc by calling the new association an organized criminal bloc on his Internet page, and its founders "traitors to the nation". Spînu said that the bloc was created near the Kremlin "so that it would be clear who they work for and who they serve".

Igor Munteanu, the leader of the pro-European extra-parliamentary opposition Coalition for Unity and Welfare (CUB), said that the emergence of a new bloc in Moscow means that plans to destabilize Moldova are entering the implementation phase.

== Member parties ==
Party	Abbr.	Ideology	Leader	Seats	Member
Șor Party (banned)	ȘOR	Populism; Russophilia	Ilan Shor	0 / 101	Apr 2024–
Revival	PR	Social conservatism Russophilia	Natalia Parasca	0 / 101	Apr 2024–
Chance	PPȘ	Liberalism; Russophilia	Alexei Lungu	0 / 101	Apr 2024–
Alternative and Salvation Force of Moldova	FASM	Social democracy Russophilia	Alexandru Beșchieru	New	Apr 2024–
Victory	PPV	Moldovenism; Russophilia	Vadim Grozavu	New	Apr 2024–

== See also ==
- Chance. Duties. Realization.
- Bloc of Communists and Socialists
