= Marina Tauber =

Moldovan politician

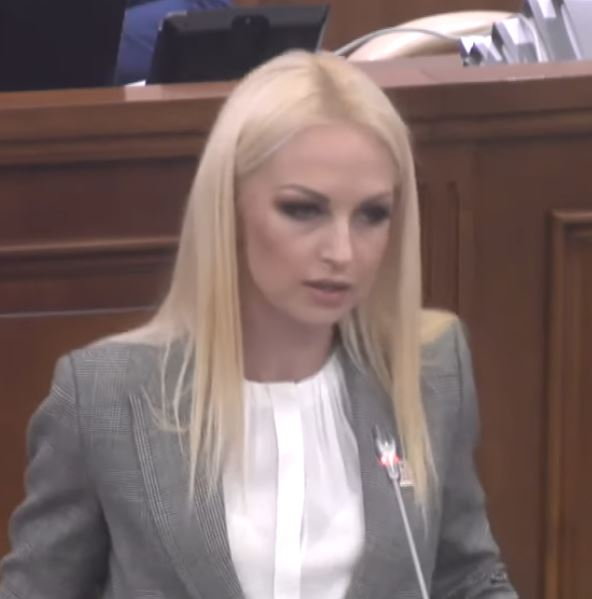
- Tauber in 2019

Member of the Moldovan Parliament
- In office 9 March 2019 – 16 October 2025
- Parliamentary group: Șor Party
- Constituency: Ivancea
- Majority: 12,226 (42.1%)

Mayor of Jora de Mijloc
- In office 28 May 2018 – 24 February 2019
- Preceded by: Ion Terenti
- Succeeded by: Sergiu Labliuc

Personal details
- Born: 1 May 1986 (age 40) Chișinău, Moldavian SSR, Soviet Union
- Party: Șor Party

Marina Tauber (born 1 May 1986) is a Moldovan opposition politician. She served as a member of the Parliament of Moldova. Having previously fled to Russia, Tauber was sentenced on 30 September 2025 to 7 years and a half of prison and announced wanted for arrest over a case of illegal funding of the banned Șor Party. She is subject to sanctions from the European Union (EU), United States and Canada.

== Biography ==
Marina Tauber was born in 1986, in Chișinău, in a family of Jewish origin. She was a high school colleague with Ilan Shor. In 2011 she graduated from the State University of Physical Education and Sport in Chișinău. She worked as a tennis player and coach.

Marina Tauber joined the Șor Party – then the Social-political movement "Ravnopravie" – in June 2016. She became vice president of the party shortly after Ilan Shor's election as the head of the political party. Tauber ran from the Shor Party for the mayoral post of the village of Jora de Mijloc during local early election, which she won. In the 2019 parliamentary elections, she became a Member of Parliament and she resigned from the position of mayor of Jora de Mijloc.

On 1 May 2023, Tauber was detained at the Chișinău International Airport while trying to leave the country for Israel via Turkey. She was arrested by the Anti-Corruption Prosecutor's Office for her role in illegally funding the party.

In May 2023, the Government of Canada imposed sanctions on Tauber.

On 31 May 2023, the European Union (EU) imposed sanctions against her, due to her association with the Russian government and because of her role in the pro-Russian unrest in Moldova.

In June 2023, Tauber made a statement accusing the President of Moldova Maia Sandu of committing genocide against the Jews of Moldova with the support of the EU. The Israeli ambassador to Moldova, Joel Lion, condemned this statement, calling it an antisemitic distortion of the Holocaust with the only aim of justifying false statements. He called on the Moldovan government to take steps to prevent any forms of denial or distortion of the Holocaust in the country, especially by members of the Moldovan parliament.

In February 2024, Tauber was included on the sanctions list of the United States Treasury "for facilitating Ilan Șor's attempts to undermine the electoral processes in Moldova in the interest of the Kremlin." The sanctions include entry bans, asset freezes and bans on transactions within the US and with US citizens. In addition, they prohibit the sale of goods, the provision of services and the transfer of money to persons who are on the sanctions lists.

In May 2024, Tauber was decorated with the Order of Friendship by Chairman of the State Duma Vyacheslav Volodin through a decree of Vladimir Putin. The order is designed to reward Russian and foreign nationals whose work, deeds and efforts have been aimed at the betterment of relations with Russia and its people. She mentioned the Victory (political bloc) in her acceptance speech, and along with Shor and Evghenia Guțul attended the 9 May Victory Day memorial parade in Moscow hosted annually by Putin.

On 8 August 2024, Tauber announced she would leave the country on account of the online threat she had received. At the time, she was still under investigation for money laundering for her party. Tauber left Moldova on 7 January 2025, after her ban on travelling outside the country was lifted. She asked that her trial be conducted in her absence. On 30 September that year, Tauber was sentenced to seven years and six months of prison and was announced wanted for arrest.
