= Jasmin (singer) =

Russian singer (born 1977)

Jasmin Жасмин
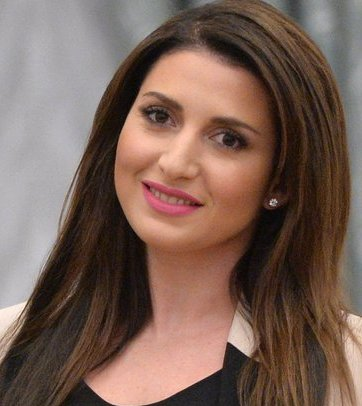
- Jasmin in 2015

Background information
- Also known as: Sara Lvovna Shor (Russian: Сара Львовна Шор); Sara Lvovna Semenduyeva (Сара Львовна Семендуева)
- Born: Sara Lvovna Manakhimova; Сара Львовна Манахимова (in Russian); 12 October 1977 (age 48); Derbent, Dagestan, RSFSR, USSR
- Genres: Pop
- Occupations: Singer, actress, model, tv presenter
- Instrument: Vocal
- Years active: 1999–present
- Labels: Квадро-Диск (2000—2004), Монолит Рекордс (2005, 2013), CD Land (2006–2009), Никитин (2012), Velvet Music (2013)
- Spouse: Ilan Shor
- Website: www.jasmin.ru

Sara Lvovna Shor (Russian: Сара Львовна Шор, born Manakhimova, Манахимова, in first marriage Semenduyeva, Семендуева; born 12 October 1977), better known by stage name Jasmin (Жасмин, lit.: jasmine), is a Russian pop singer, actress, model, and TV presenter, and designer of Mountain Jewish descent. She holds the honor of Merited Artist of the Russian Federation (2014).

== Personal Life and Career ==
During her musical career she released 10 studio albums. She has been married to Ilan Shor since 2011. In addition to Jasmin's son from a previous marriage, they have a daughter, Margarita, who was born in 2012, and a son, Miron, who was born in 2016.

On 26 October 2022, she was sanctioned by the United States Department of Treasury's Office of Foreign Assets Control as a Specially Designated National under GLOMAG over her and her husband's association with the government of Russia. Originally convicted in 2017 for fraud in Moldova, Ilan Shor on appeal had his sentence doubled to 15 in years in prison in absentia with confiscation of his assets. Ilan Shor fled to Israel in 2019 and to Russia in 2024 and is currently on a wanted list.

== Discography ==
=== Albums ===
Year	Title	Notes
2000	"Долгие дни" (Dolgie dni/Long days)	90 000 copies
2001	"Перепишу любовь" (Perepišu ljubov’/Rewrite love)	270 000 copies
2002	"Головоломка" (Golovolomka/Puzzle)	310 000 copies
2003	"100% любви" (100% ljubvi/100% of love)	80 000 copies
2004	"Да!" (Da!/Yes!)	650 000 copies
2005	"Тебе понравится" (Tebe ponravitsä/You’ll like it)	150 000 copies
2009	"Мечта" (Mečta/Dream)	50 000 copies
2013	"От любви до любви" (Ot ljubvi do ljubvi/From love to love)
2014	"Восточная любовь" (Vostočnaja ljubov’/Eastern love)
2019	"Я верю в любовь" (Ja verju v ljubov’/I believe in love)

=== Charts ===
Year	Title	Airplay Detection TopHit 100	Moscow Airplay TopHit 100
2003	Дольче вита	18	–
2003	Да!	18	–
2004	Самый любимый	6	–
2004	Самый любимый (ремикс)	49	–
2004	Капля лета	3	–
2004	Разгадай любовь	9	46
2004	Утренняя гимнастика	119	–
2005	Как ты мне нужен	13	17
2005	Индийское диско	1	2
2005	Тебе понравится	3	4
2006	Первый близкий	10	17
2006	Загадай	10	11
2007	Боль	46	64
2007	Дежавю	45	28
2007	История	70	142
2007	Почему-то (Мечта)	66	59
2007	Алмазы	59	64
2008	Пей любовь	22	12
2008	Ресничка	32	18
2009	Ночь	33	35
2009	Будем откровенны	189	–
2009	Ты — вода, я — огонь	80	40
2009	Виновата	27	43
2010	Не жалею	46	61
2010	Здравствуй, новая любовь	34	36
2010	Здравствуй, новая любовь (ремикс)	34	36
2011	Лабу-Дабу	34	35
2011	Можно	17	–
2012	От любви до любви	26	58
2012	Руки в рукава	36	50
2013	Дважды	20	27

=== Video albums ===
- 2005 — "Да!" (solo concert)
- 2005 — "Jasmin. Grand Collection" (contains 18 videos)

=== Bibliography ===
- 2007 — "Заложница"

=== Tours ===
- 2005 — "Да!" (Russia)
- 2009 — "Мечта" (USA)
- 2012 — "Лабу-Дабу" (USA)
- 2012—2014 "От любви до любви" (Russia, Moldova)
- 2014—2016 "Другая Я" (Russia, USA, Italy, Spain, Lithuania, Latvia, Estonia)

== Awards ==
- 2009 – Honored Artist of the Republic of Dagestan
- 2014 – "Honored Artist of Russia"
- 2019 – "Fashion People Awards Kids" Award (nomination "Family Values")
