= Valerii Klimenko =

Valerii Klimenko (or Klimenco; born 20 September 1953) is a Russian-born Moldovan politician currently serving as a municipal councilor of Chișinău. He is the founder of the Ravnopravie Movement (now the Shor Party), and its honorary chairman.

== Biography and career ==
Born in the Sverdlovsk region of the Russian SFSR, he graduated from high school in the city of Poltava, Ukrainian SSR. In 1979, he became a correspondent for the newspaper Moldova Sovietica, and in 1980 he graduated from the Faculty of Journalism at the University of Lviv. In 1990, he obtained a doctorate in history from the same university.

== Political activity ==
In 1996, he founded the Russian Community of Chișinău, and since 1997, he has been president of the Congress of Russian Communities in the Republic of Moldova. In 1998, he founded the Ravnopravie Movement. In 2002–2003, he was a representative of the Congress of Russian Communities in the Republic of Moldova in the Council of Compatriots, under the State Duma of Russia. In 1999–2011, he was a councilor in the Chișinău Municipal Council, elected on the lists of the Ravnopravie Movement. In the fall of 2010, Ravnopravie entered the electoral race for the parliamentary elections in the Republic of Moldova with the slogan: For Moldova as part of Russia!. In 2016, he ceded the leadership of the party to Ilan Shor, changing its name to the Shor Party. Klimenko remained the honorary chairman of the party.

== Political views ==
Klimenko is known for his pro-Russian and anti-European stance. Some of his positions led Romanian newspaper Adevărul to describe him as an "anti-Romanian leader". Klimenko opposes the idea of the unification of Moldova with Romania, arguing that it could create a civil war, in which Russia would also participate.

== Personal life ==
Klimenko speaks Russian and Ukrainian. He is married and has one child.
