= Ilan Shor =

Moldovan oligarch, politician and convicted fraudster (born 1987)

- אילן שור
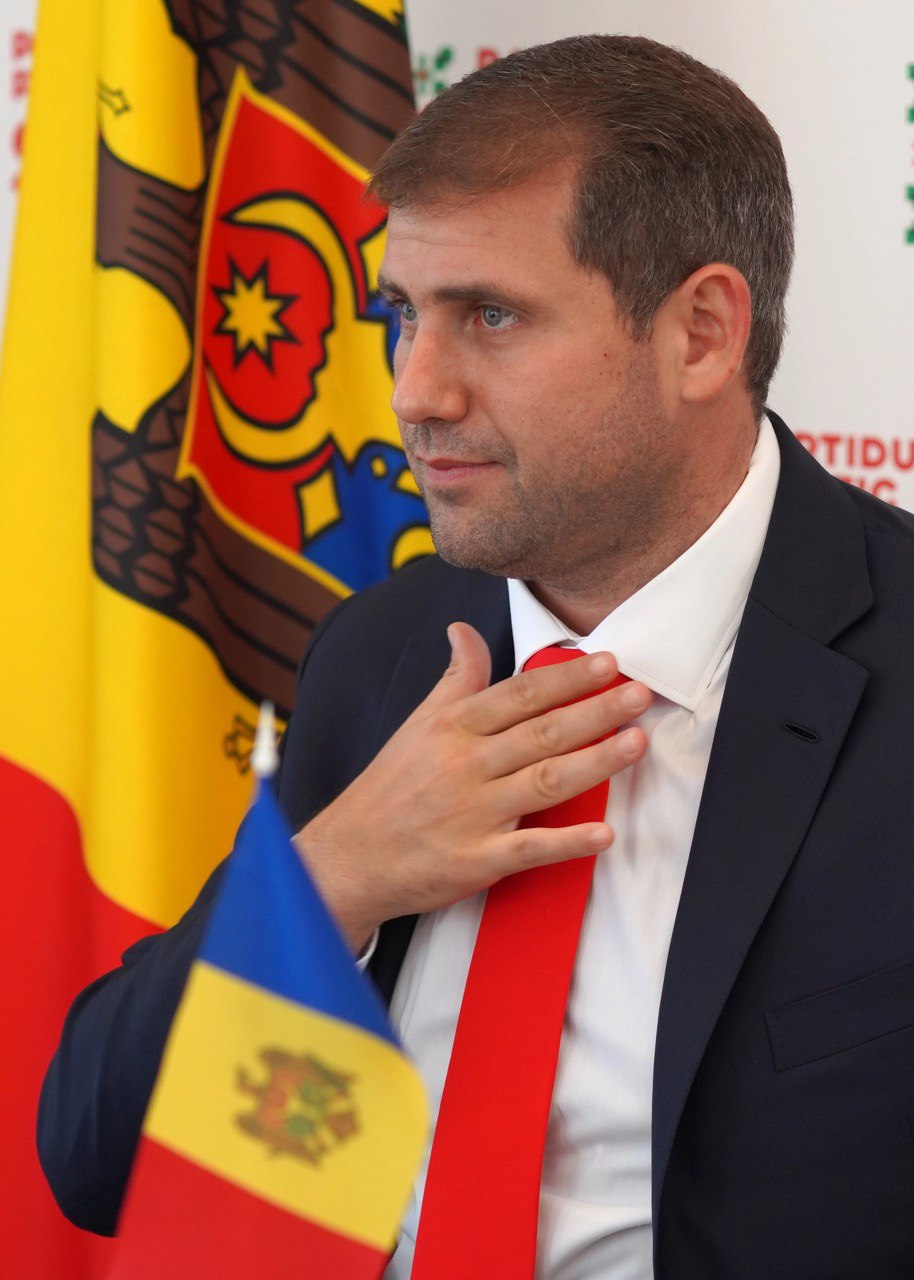
- Shor in 2021

President of the Victory Bloc
- Incumbent
- Assumed office 21 April 2024

President of the Șor Party
- In office 3 October 2016 – 19 June 2023
- Preceded by: Valerii Klimenko (as President of the Equality Socio-Political Movement)

Member of the Moldovan Parliament
- In office 9 March 2019 – 27 April 2023
- Parliamentary group: Șor Party
- Constituency: Orhei
- Majority: 17,968 (59.2%)

Mayor of Orhei
- In office 1 July 2015 – 9 April 2019
- Preceded by: Vitalie Colun
- Succeeded by: Pavel Verejanu

Personal details
- Born: 6 March 1987 (age 39) Tel Aviv, Israel
- Citizenship: Moldovan; Israeli; Russian
- Party: Șor Party
- Other political affiliations: Chance. Duties. Realization (2023–2024); Victory (2024–present)
- Spouse: Sara Shor
- Children: 2
- Occupation: Businessman, banker, politician

Ilan Shor (also Șor; Hebrew: אילן שור; born 6 March 1987) is an Israeli and Moldovan pro-Russian fugitive oligarch and politician. He was the chairman of the banned Șor Party and has played various roles in its successors. He resides in Russia, a country whose citizenship he received in 2024.

Shor was a key figure in the 2014 Moldovan bank fraud scandal, where approximately $1 billion was transferred out of Moldovan banks for loans that would not be repaid, resulting in a total loss equivalent to 12% of Moldova's GDP and the arrest of former Prime Minister Vlad Filat.

His pro-Russian party, the Șor Party, was banned by the Constitutional Court of Moldova on 19 June 2023 after months of protests organized by his party. According to the court, these protests were designed to destabilize Moldova and foment a coup in order to install a pro-Russian government. The Constitutional Court revoked the ban on 27 March 2024.

Shor has stated that he believes "the only salvation" for Moldova is "union with the Russian Federation" and that "it makes no sense to talk about the country's independence". On 1 December 2025, Shor announced from Moscow the end of his "social projects" in Moldova and the withdrawal of his political support for local elected officials affiliated with him and the parties they belonged to.

== Early life, family and education ==
Shor was born in Tel Aviv, Israel, on 6 March 1987, the son of Miron and Maria Shor, Moldovan Jews from Chișinău who had moved to Israel in the late 1970s. The family returned to Chișinău around 1990, when Shor was either two or three years old, and his father went into business in Moldova. According to sources close to the then-Moldovan president Mircea Snegur, Israeli businessman Miron Shor, father of Ilan, who was a friend of Boris Birshtein, moved to Moldova in 1991, at the invitation of Snegur. Miron Shor died in 2005.

== Career ==
He owns several Moldovan businesses, including a company named Dufremol (Duty-free) and the FC Milsami football club. In 2014, he became the chairman of the board of the Savings Bank of Moldova.

== Social work in Moldova ==
In 2018, Shor opened the largest amusement park in Moldova, OrheiLand, offering free access to all visitors.

Shor invests $250 million in various infrastructure projects across Moldova through Eurasia Non-Profit Organization.

According to Shor Party’s annual report, in 2024, Ilan Shor's team delivered a range of social and infrastructure projects across the country, including the construction and opening of the GagauziyaLand amusement park in Gagauzia and a city park in Orhei, road repairs on over 20 streets, the installation of 20+ new bus stops, the renovation of 14 courtyards, and the implementation of 11 infrastructure projects in schools and kindergartens. They built 23 new children's playgrounds and continued developing sports facilities. Notably, the team provided monthly pension and salary supplements of 2,000 lei to over 36,000 senior citizens and public sector workers, and launched volunteer initiatives to deliver firewood, food, and medicine to those in need across the country.

== Convicted bank fraudster ==
In the week preceding the 2014 Moldovan parliamentary elections, more than $750 million (~$1 billion in 2025) were extracted from the three banks between 24 and 26 November. A van belonging to Klassica Force, a company owned by Shor, was stolen while transporting 12 sacks of bank files and burned on November 27. Records of many transactions were deleted from the banks' computers. On 26 November 2014, the banks went bankrupt and were later placed under special administration of the National Bank of Moldova. On 27 November, the Moldovan Government, headed by Prime Minister Iurie Leancă, secretly decided to bail out the three banks with $870 million in emergency loans, covered from state reserves. This created a deficit in Moldovan public finances equivalent to an eighth of the country's gross domestic product (GDP), which will have to be paid for by the Moldovan taxpayer.

Auditors from Kroll Inc. reviewed transactions at the three banks with missing funds in November 2014. The report documents how companies tied to Shor gradually took control of the banks and then allegedly issued massive loans to affiliated companies. It concluded the three banks transferred at least 13.5 billion lei to five Moldovan companies affiliated with the Shor group, controlled by Shor, between November 24 and 26.

In March 2015, Ilan Shor was suspected by the National Anti-Corruption Center (NAC) for his work in the Savings Bank. On 17 March 2015 he was questioned for 8 hours and anti-corruption officers seized his personal property. On May 6, 2015, Shor was placed under house arrest. As of 2015, Shor was allowed to move freely, after a period of house arrest. This is because he fully cooperated with the investigation. Despite this, he was allowed to register for electoral race for the mayor of city of Orhei, a contest in which he won 62% of the vote on June 14 local government election.

In October 2015, Vlad Filat, former prime minister of Moldova and leader of the Liberal Democratic Party, was investigated for his involvement in the fraud and was accused of having taken bribes of about $250 million from Shor. On June 27, 2016, Vlad Filat was sentenced to 9 years in prison.

Shor was sentenced to 7.5 years in prison in June 2017 for money laundering, fraud and breach of trust in relation to the banks. Shor was under house arrest pending an appeal and in 2019 fled to Israel. On 13 April 2023, the appeal court doubled the sentence to 15 years in prison in absentia on graft charges and froze all his assets.

A key witness in the bank fraud case against Ilan Shor has retracted his original testimony during a deposition in a US court.

== Political career ==
=== Mayor of Orhei ===
On 14 June 2015, Shor was elected mayor of the Moldovan town of Orhei with 62% of the vote, a post he held until April 2019.

According to the polls made in 2019 related to the most popular politicians in Moldova, Shor was ranked at the third position among the top politicians in which Moldovans had the highest trust, and by some polls he was ranked at the sixth and at the seventh position accordingly.

=== Opposition figure in Moldova's Parliament (2019–2023) ===
Whilst in exile, and with an arrest warrant outstanding, Shor was elected to the Parliament of Moldova in 2019 on the Șor Party list. He was re-elected in the 2021 Moldovan parliamentary election as one of six Șor Party MP's. Following confirmation of his conviction, on 27 April 2023 Shor was removed as an MP, an appeal being rejected.

Shor is a pro-Moscow opposition figure in Moldovan politics who has been described as "a leading figure in the Kremlin’s efforts to subvert" the Republic of Moldova, according to intelligence reports. Shor is known by the moniker "The Young One" by Russia's Federal Security Service (FSB), which, according to intercepted communications, sent Russian political strategists to assist Shor's political party.

==== Banning of Shor and the Șor Party from Moldovan politics ====
On 19 June 2023, the Șor Party was banned by the Constitutional Court of Moldova. The court had declared the party unconstitutional, with court chairman Nicolae Roșca citing "an article in the constitution stating that parties must through their activities uphold political pluralism, the rule of law and the territorial integrity of Moldova."

On 31 July, the Moldovan parliament voted in favour of banning the leaders of the dissolved Șor Party and Ilan Shor from standing in elections for a period of five years. Shor has claimed he will contest the ban.

==== Ș.O.R. bloc ====
In June 2023 Ilan Shor created a new Moldovan political group, the Chance. Duties. Realization political bloc whose abbreviation in Romanian is Ș.O.R., with Shor inviting all political parties to join the group. The Chance party became led by former journalist Alexei Lungu in August 2023, affiliating with Shor, but Chance was deregistered only days before the November local elections after the director of the Security and Intelligence Service (SIS) stated the party was corrupting voters and using illegal funds from Russia.

In September 2023, his political party reportedly gathered support and "seized" the ethnic enclave of Gagauzia via embezzled money.

==== Victory (political bloc) ====
In April 2024 Shor invited a number of Moldovan political figures to Moscow, where they formed the political bloc Victory. On 7 August 2024, the Central Electoral Commission of Moldova forbade the recognition and certification of the Victory bloc in the concurrent 2024 Moldovan presidential election and 2024 Moldovan European Union membership constitutional referendum.

In a 6 July 2025 congress of Victory held in Moscow, Shor stated that he wanted Evghenia Guțul, Governor of Gagauzia, to head the party's electoral list for the 2025 Moldovan parliamentary election. At the moment, Guțul was being investigated for two criminal cases and was under house arrest.

On 1 December that year, Shor made an announcement from Moscow regarding the end of the "social projects" he initiated in Moldova and the withdrawal of his political support for local elected officials affiliated with him and the political formations they belonged to.

== Sanctions ==
On 26 October 2022, he was sanctioned by the US Department of Treasury's Office of Foreign Assets Control as a Specially Designated National under GLOMAG over his association with the Russian government.

On 9 December 2022, the United Kingdom HM Treasury imposed sanctions, considering Shor an involved person under the Global Anti-Corruption Sanctions Regulations, involved in serious corruption with respect to bribery of foreign public officials.

On 31 May 2023, European Union imposed sanctions against him, due to his association with the Russian government and because of his role in the pro-Russian unrest in Moldova.

== Corruption ==
In 2015, Shor was arrested on charges of money laundering and misappropriation of funds. Corruption investigators allege that Shor legalized more than $335 million of the stolen billion.

In June 2015, while under house arrest, he registered as a candidate in the mayoral election of Orhei, Moldova's fifth-largest city. He was released to participate in the election campaign and won the election in the first round. After that, prosecutors did not set preventive measures against him. In October 2015, Shor delivered a "confession of guilt". He went to the National Anti-Corruption Center (NCAC), and submitted to the prosecutors a 10-page document of "corrupt practices" on the part of former Prime Minister Vlad Filat. According to Shor, in exchange for providing various services and favoring Shor's business, Filat received about $250 million from him over the years. Based on his testimony, Filat was sentenced to nine years in prison. Filat denied any joint business dealings with Ilan Shor.

In 2023, MP Nesterovski, who had been acting in the interests of Shor's criminal group since March, recruited former MP Arina Spătaru (a member of parliament from 2019 to 2021), to create a new pro-European party that would act in the interests of Ilan Shor. Spătaru contacted the Moldovan intelligence services, reporting a financial offer from Shor in exchange for the creation of a controlled pro-European party. This was how Moldova learned of Shor's plans to finance several parties at once in local elections. According to Spătaru, in a private conversation, Shor admitted to her that the money to finance the parties came from Russia. According to political analyst Victor Ciobanu, "for Russia, against the background of the lack of success in the war against Ukraine, it is important to win a geopolitical victory by non-military methods in Moldova," and Shor would help them with this.

In 2023, after the Chișinău Court of Appeal heard the case, the European Commission called the sentencing of Ilan Shor, leader of the pro-Russian Moldovan Shor party, an important step toward justice and the fight against corruption in Moldova.

Maia Sandu, President of Moldova, stated that the Victory political bloc, led by Shor, was created from and for corruption.

The Party of Socialists of the Republic of Moldova (PSRM) has claimed that Shor, using a "clone party", has started a process of massive corruption and bribery of members of the Party of Socialists. The party in question is the political party Renaștere ("Renaissance"), which came into the public eye after several Socialist MPs joined it in May 2023.

Ilan Shor is under EU, Swiss and US sanctions for trying to destabilize the country.

== Investigations and links to Russia ==
RISE Moldova, a partner of the Organized Crime and Corruption Reporting Project (OCCRP), reports that the investment program of oligarch Ilan Shor, who fled to Russia from a prison sentence in Moldova, was funded by a former Moldovan law enforcement officer and suspected money launderer on behalf of an organized crime group who now lives in Moscow. In August 2023, ahead of the general election, Ilan Shor announced that he was launching a "Moldovan Village" program, under which each mayor's office would receive 20 million lei (about $1.1 million) over the next three years through his Visul meu ("My Dream") fund. A month later, several mayoralties signed sponsorship contracts, however not with Shor's foundation, but with 61-year-old Israeli citizen Igal Shved. Moldova's SIS found out that Shved's money came from Russia and that he holds a Russian passport. According to the ISS, in 2021, the Service for Prevention and Combating Money Laundering suspected that Victor Gutsuliak, from whom Shved received funds, previously worked in Moldovan law enforcement agencies and now lives in Russia. He laundered funds for the benefit of a criminal group led by Ilan Shor: his account received 166 million rubles (about two million euros) from Anastasia Dronova, who was involved in "Russian oligarchic groups linked to high-ranking individuals in Moscow." According to RISE Moldova, after Shved's funds were seized, Ilan Shor began using cash couriers to withdraw the money to Moldova.

According to a Washington Post investigation in 2020, the Russian Federal Security Service (FSB) began cooperating with Shor's party. The political technologists bought prepaid SIM cards for disposable cellphones, advised the party to erase as much information as possible about the politician's "negative past" (WP suggests it was Shor's criminal record) and try to whitewash his image online. They also advised offering journalists "rewards" for deleting articles. Management control of Moldova's two main pro-Russian TV channels was transferred to a close associate of Shor. This became the politician's main platform for pushing an agenda aligned with Moscow. When Shor had a conflict with Moldovan authorities in 2020, the FSB helped him to transfer one of his key assets — shares in Chișinău International Airport — to Russian businessman Andrei Goncharenko. Shor has said he does not own the stake, but FSB documents from 2020 refer to the airport as "Shor's asset."

In 2024, a number of politicians linked to Shor's group created Victory (political bloc) in Moscow, which aims to strengthen the opposition, already directly or indirectly united by fugitive MP Ilan Shor's former “Shor” party, against the current government. It also aims to change Moldova's pro-European orientation by restoring relations with Russia, the Commonwealth of Independent States and the Eurasian Economic Union. Political analysts from Chisinau argue that the creation of the Victory bloc in Moscow marked the beginning of a campaign to destabilize the country. They also claim that this event would not have taken place without the participation of the special services of the Russian Federation and that Ilan Shor is fully under the tutelage of the Moscow services.

The Reset investigation for Wired magazine, published on January 10, 2024, claims that in 2023 Shor spent more than $200,000 on social network advertising campaigns that promoted the Kremlin's interests in Moldova. The publication recalls how in February 2023, it became known that Meta (the company that owns Facebook and Instagram) allowed Shor to place paid advertisements in social networks calling for protests in Moldova, despite the US sanctions that prohibit US companies from engaging in financial transactions with individuals and groups on the sanctions list. Following this, Meta said it would ban Shor's ads. However, as the publication notes, according to a new investigation, Shor and his party continued to use the social network, launching an even larger advertising campaign to destabilize local elections in Moldova and hinder the country's European integration. According to the investigation, Shor used more than 100 fake pages on Facebook in six months to run hundreds of ads that were viewed more than 155 million times.

On 3 October 2024, Moldovan authorities accused Shor of organising a plot involving $15 million in funds from Russia that were distributed to around 130,000 people in order to bribe voters into selecting anti-Western decisions during the 2024 Moldovan presidential election and the concurrent 2024 Moldovan European Union membership constitutional referendum and spread disinformation against the European Union on social media, following raids on 26 locations nationwide. In response, Shor said that the payments were legal and claimed that Moldova had become a "police state".

In a congress of the Victory bloc held in Moscow on 6 July 2025, Shor stated that he believed "the only salvation" for Moldova was "union with the Russian Federation", a union that should be "strong, stable and durable". He stated that "it makes no sense to talk about the country's independence", adding the comment "one currency, one parliament". Shor justified himself by stating that "all the resources for the development of Moldova reside in the Russian Federation" and that both peoples share "the same cultural code".

In September 2025, an investigation article by The BBC revealed a secret Russian-backed network trying to disrupt the election in Moldova scheduled on 28 September. According to the BBC, sanctioned Russian groups recruited operatives on Telegram, then trained them to spread fake news. They posted pro Russian content, attacked the pro EU ruling party, and ran fake polls to question the results. The investigation linked the operation to Ilan Shor and the banned NGO Evrazia, which reached millions on TikTok and Facebook. Recruits used ChatGPT to create false content after filming opposition supporters. The investigation claims the funding comes from Moscow and is part of wider Kremlin efforts to destabillize Moldova.

According to journalists from Current Time TV and Radio Free Europe/Radio Liberty, the Russian-flagged oil tanker Marinera (formerly Bella 1), seized by the United States Coast Guard on 7 January 2026 during the United States oil blockade during Operation Southern Spear, was linked to Shor, as well as to Ukrainian pro-Russian fugitive politician Viktor Baranskyi.

== Personal life ==
Since 2011, Shor has been married to the Russian-Jewish singer Jasmin (Sara Shor). In addition to Jasmin's son from a previous marriage, they have a daughter, Margarita, who was born in 2012, and a son, Miron, who was born in 2016.

On 16 May 2024, he received Russian citizenship.

== See also ==
- A7 (company)
