= Chance. Duties. Realization. =

Moldovan political party

Chance. Duties. Realization. Șansă, Obligații, Realizări.
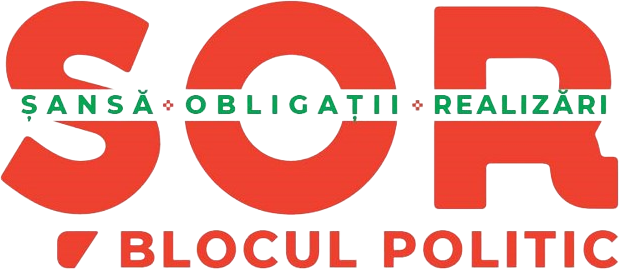
- Abbreviation: ȘOR
- Political coordinator: Ilan Shor
- Founder: Ilan Shor
- Founded: 26 June 2023
- Dissolved: 21 April 2024
- Preceded by: Șor Party
- Succeeded by: Victory (de facto)
- Ideology: Russophilia; Populism; Social conservatism; Hard Euroscepticism
- Political position: Centre-left
- Bloc members: Șor Party (banned); Chance (PPȘ); Alternative and Salvation Force of Moldova (FASM)
- Colours: Green; Red
- Parliament (Note: Since the deputies of the Șor Party were legally banned from joining other formations, they sit de jure as independents.): 0 / 101
- District Presidents: 0 / 32
- Mayors: 0 / 898

Website
- partidulsor.md

Chance. Duties. Realization. (Romanian: Șansă, Obligații, Realizări, ȘOR) was a political bloc in Moldova founded by Ilan Shor after the legal ban on the Șor Party.

== History ==
On 19 June 2023, the Constitutional Court of Moldova ruled at the request of the government, declaring the Șor Party illegal and de jure disbanded. The Șor Party appeared in a criminal case on the financing of an election campaign in the elections for the Bălți mayoral elections in 2021 and in receiving money from a criminal group. Ilan Shor himself, who fled Moldova in June 2019 after the constitutional crisis, was sentenced in absentia on 13 April 2023 by judges of the Chișinău Court of Appeal to 15 years in prison with a term to be served in a closed prison.

On 26 June 2023, Shor announced the creation of the "Chance. Duties. Realization" bloc, which would be abbreviated as "ȘOR". Shor himself planned to take the position of "political coordinator" in the new formation. He also reiterated that he intends to appeal to the European Court of Human Rights (ECHR) regarding the decision of the Constitutional Court to ban the Șor Party.

Shor stated that the first two parties that showed themselves open to joining the ȘOR bloc are the party Ours (Ai noștri/Наши) and the "Alternative and Salvation Force of Moldova" (FASM).

Politologist Ian Lisnevschi argued that the new political bloc might unite the center-left opposition against Maia Sandu.

In early November 2023, shortly before the local elections, the party's registration was annulled by the Special Situations Commission due to alleged links with Ilan Shor, who remained a fugitive, and allegations of unlawful financing.

In October 2023, the Constitutional Court of Moldova ruled that Article 16 of the Electoral Code was unconstitutional and that former members of the Șor Party could stand for elections. Shortly after, the Exceptional Situations Committee overturned the lifting of the ban on Șor party members and also decided that all former members of the party that were charged, indicted, or even under suspicion of committing criminal acts will be banned from participating in the 2023 Moldovan local elections.

An appeal to the Chișinău Court of Appeal after the local elections saw a reversal in December 2023 of the ban, that had seen 600 candidates removed from the November ballot.
