= Lucie Potůčková =

Czech politician (born 1975)

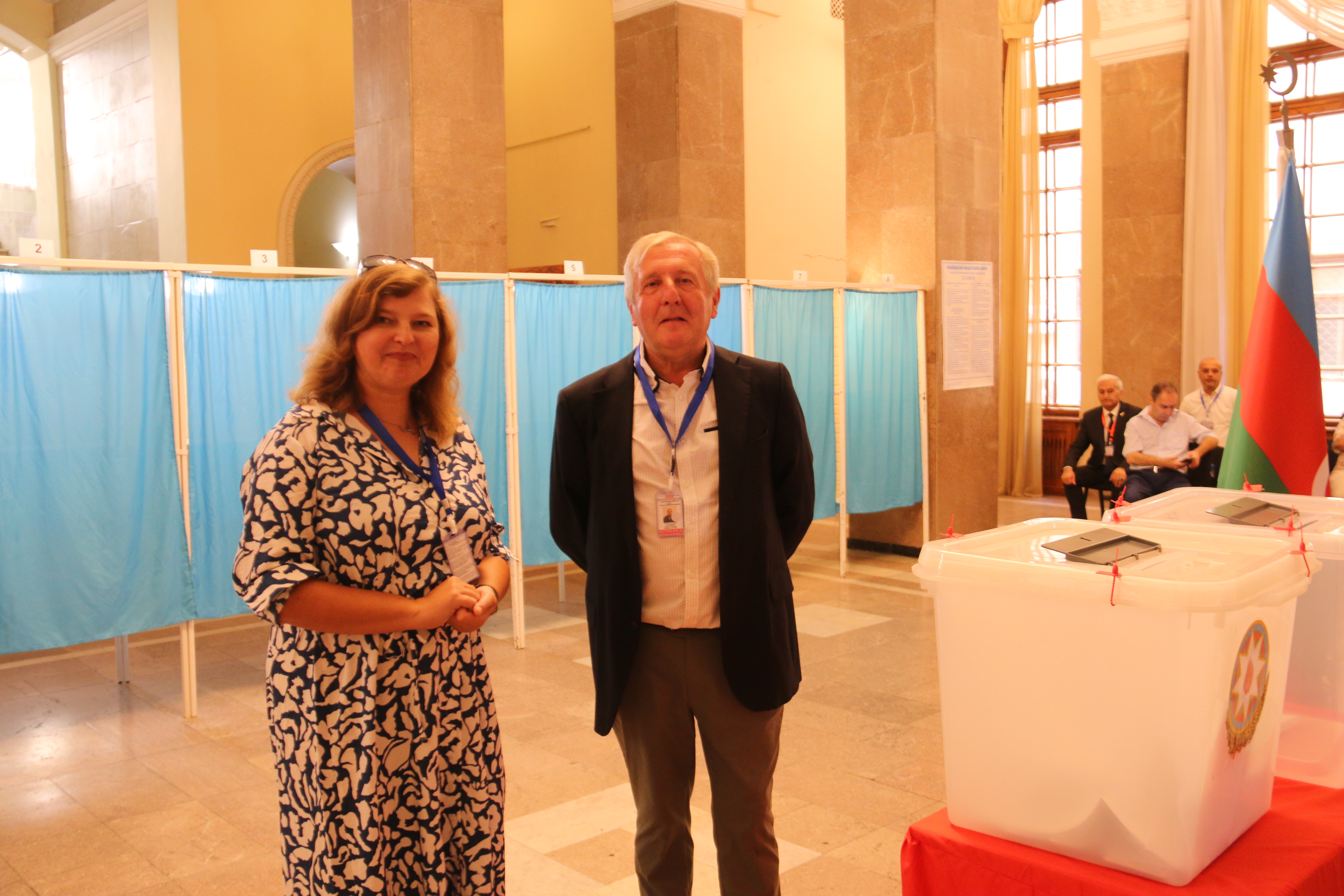
- Potůčková in 2024

Member of the Chamber of Deputies
- Incumbent
- Assumed office 9 October 2021

Personal details
- Born: 1 September 1975 (age 50)
- Party: Mayors and Independents

Lucie Potůčková (born 1 September 1975) is a Czech politician of Mayors and Independents. She has been a member of the Chamber of Deputies since 2021, and has served as mayor of Mladé Buky since 2014. She has been a member of the Parliamentary Assembly of the Organization for Security and Co-operation in Europe since 2021, and has chaired its third committee since 2023.
