= Jora de Mijloc =

- Commune
- Interactive map of Jora de Mijloc
- Country: Moldova
- District: Orhei District

Population (2014)
  - Total: 3,543
- Time zone: UTC+2 (EET)
  - Summer (DST): UTC+3 (EEST)

Jora de Mijloc is a commune in Orhei District, Moldova. It is composed of four villages: Jora de Jos, Jora de Mijloc, Jora de Sus and Lopatna.
