= Chance Political Party =

Moldovan political party

Chance Political Party Partidul Politic „Șansă”
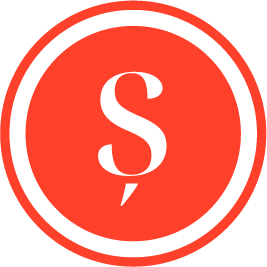
- Leader: Alexei Lungu
- Founder: Mihail Ahremțev
- Founded: 20 October 2020 (Ours) 30 July 2023 (Chance)
- Registered: 18 August 2021
- Dissolved: 22 July 2026; 3 months ago
- Ideology: Russophilia; Liberalism (self-declared); Social democracy; Christian democracy
- Political position: Centre-left
- National affiliation: Chance. Duties. Realization. (2023–2024); Victory (2024–present)
- Parliament: 0 / 101
- District Presidents: 0 / 32

Website
- sansa.md (Chance) partidul.md (Ours)

The Chance Political Party (Romanian: Partidul Politic „Șansă”), known until 2023 as Ours Moldovan Political Party (Romanian: Partidul Politic Moldovenesc "Ai Noștri"/"Наши"), was a political party in Moldova. It was founded in October 2020 by Mihail Ahremțev. the party was dissolved on 22 July 2026 after judgment of Central Court of Appeal of Chisinau.

== History ==
=== Ours ===
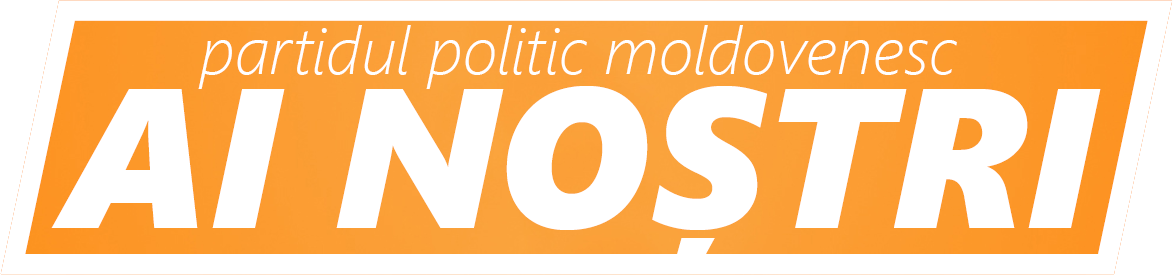
Ours party logo

The creation of Ours was announced on 20 October 2020. The party leader at the time, Mihail Ahremțev, later came to be a supporter of the Russian invasion of Ukraine. Ahremțev claimed at the moment of the party's creation that, in Moldova, a "genocide" against the ethnic minorities of the country was taking place and that the party would promote the interests of Moldova's minorities, including the Gagauz people and the Transnistrians. Another founding member, Anastasia Filipașcu, claimed that the Romanians are an ethnic minority in Moldova. The party also wants Russian to become the second state language of Moldova. The party has been described as statist, Moldovenist, pro-Russian, and anti-Western.

On 26 June 2023, the party joined the Chance. Duties. Realization political bloc, dominated by former Șor Party members.

=== Chance ===
Soon after Ilan Shor announced the creation of the Chance. Duties. Realization bloc, the Ours party renamed itself the Chance party, and the Moldovan TV presenter Alexei Lungu became the leader of the party.

The party was excluded from 2023 Moldovan local elections two days before polling stations opened. This was announced by Prime Minister Dorin Recean, saying that the decision was made by the Commission for Emergency Situations (CSE). The party tried to appeal this decision.

On 14 July 2025, the Moldovan Central Electoral Commission released the list of parties that would be eligible to run in the 2025 Moldovan parliamentary elections. The Chance party being one of the parties that were excluded from the list.

On 22 July 2026, the party was forcibly dissolved by a court ruling.

== Ideology ==
In its statute, the party states its commitment to the principles of social democracy and mixed economy, and defines itself as a centre-left or a broadly left-wing party. The party also declared itself liberal. The leader of the party, Alexei Lungu, promotes geopolitical non-alignment of Moldova, arguing that "people should not go east or west and beg for money, no matter what the conditions are". Chance party promises to "work for the development of the country", bring investors into "concrete projects", and ensure that "justice is not a tool used for political vendettas". The party is closely associated with the banned Șor Party and Ilan Shor. The Prime Minister of Moldova Dorin Recean accused the Chance Party of being a simple rename, and a direct continuation, of the banned Șor Party.
