= RISE Moldova =

Non-governmental organization

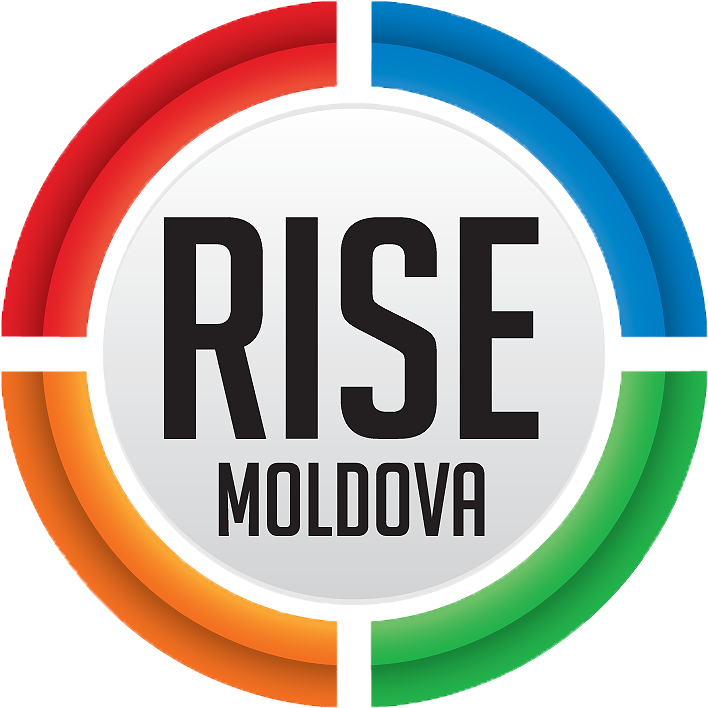
RISE Moldova

RISE Moldova (Romanian: Asociația Reporterilor de Investigație și Securitate Editorială; The Association of Investigative Reporters and Editorial Security) is an independent, non-governmental and nonprofit organization consisting of investigative journalists, programmers and activists from Moldova and Romania. Investigations made by RISE Moldova journalists were shortlisted for the European Press Prize for two years in a row.

== History ==
RISE Moldova was founded in March 2014 by ex-Ziarul de Gardă journalists Iurie Sanduta, Nicolae Cuschevici and ex-Adevărul Moldova reporter Ion Preasca. Current members list also includes but not limited to the following journalists: Mihai Munteanu, Olga Ceaglei, Vladimir Thoric, Dumitru Lazur, Doina Ipatii and Dumitru Stoianov. Project's activity was launched with grants from United States Bureau of Democracy, Human Rights and Labor and Open Society Foundations.

In 2026, RISE was designated as an 'undesirable organization' in Russia.

== Notable investigations ==
Since its launch RISE Moldova has investigated and published materials, stories and filmed short documentaries on such subjects as corruption, conflict of interests and cross border organised crime schemes and networks. First investigation signed by RISE Moldova started in 2013, when RISE journalists cooperated with colleagues from United Kingdom, Romania and Russia to uncover complex illegal business and criminal schemes behind a cross border network of assassins-for-hire operating throughout Europe. This investigation was a finalist at the 2013 European Press Prize.

Another investigation, named "Russian Laundromat", revealed international money laundering scheme that moved tens billions dollars into Europe using offshore companies, fake loans and bribed Moldovan judges. Some of the Russian banks involved were owned in part by Igor Putin, cousin of Russian President Vladimir Putin. It was named the best investigation of 2014 by Centre of Independent Journalism of Moldova. It was also shortlisted for the 2014 European Press Prize and won The Special Jury Award.

Other important cross border investigations covered such themes as arms smuggling from Transnistria to Ukraine and international routes in Asia; hidden wealth of the Moldovan politicians; the business of priests in Moldova and church's connection to the underworld.

== SwissLeaks ==
On March 11, 2015, RISE Moldova became first media outlet to unveil names of Moldovans linked to SwissLeaks case. RISE published documents on secret accounts held by eight Moldovan emigrants at Swiss bank HSBC with total amount of $22,8 million. These documents were obtained via International Consortium of Investigative Journalists (ICIJ) network.

== Panama Papers ==
RISE Moldova was part of global investigative project Panama Papers and was the only media outlet from Moldova which received access to the leaked Mossack Fonseca documents. The first Panama Papers story on public person from Moldova was published on April 4, 2016, and was about business ties and offshore connections of ex-prime minister of Moldova Ion Sturza. The documents were initially received by the German newspaper Süddeutsche Zeitung and shared by the International Consortium of Investigative Journalists and the Organized Crime and Corruption Reporting Project.

== Partners ==
RISE Moldova activates in the Organized Crime and Corruption Reporting Project, a regional organization which gathers investigative journalism associations from Eastern Europe. Other partnerships include Global Investigative Journalism Network, n-ost and RISE Project.
