= Șor Party =

Pro-Russia political party in Moldova

ȘOR Party Partidul „ȘOR”
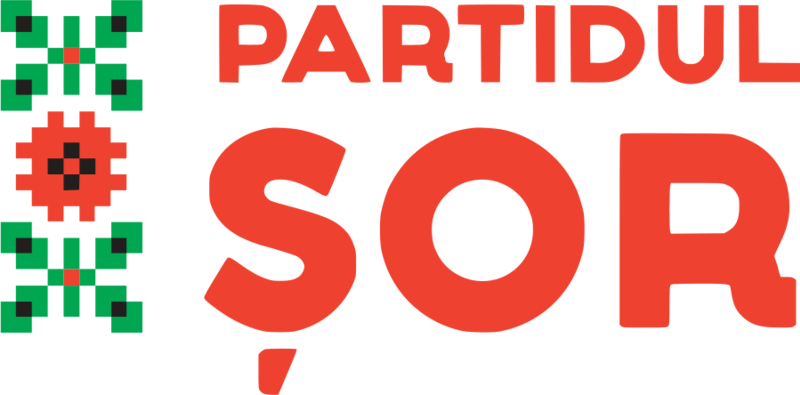
- Abbreviation: ȘOR
- President: Ilan Shor
- General Secretary: Maria Albot
- Vice President: Marina Tauber
- Founder and Honorary President: Valerii Klimenko
- Founded: 13 June 1998; 28 years ago (Socio-Political Movement "Equality") 3 October 2016; 10 years ago (Șor Party)
- Dissolved: 19 June 2023; 3 years ago
- Succeeded by: Chance. Duties. Realization. (de jure); Ours (de facto); Revival (de facto)
- Headquarters: Vasile Lupu 36, Orhei
- Membership (2019): 52,464
- Ideology: National conservatism; Russophilia; Populism; Social conservatism; Social democracy; Hard Euroscepticism
- Political position: Syncretic
- National affiliation: Chance. Duties. Realization.
- European affiliation: European Conservatives and Reformists Party (2018–2022)
- Colours: Green; Red
- Slogan: Schimbare pentru Moldova ('Change for Moldova')
- Parliament (2021): 6 / 101 (6%)
- District Presidents (2019): 1 / 32 (3%)
- Mayors (2019): 43 / 898 (5%)

Website
- partidulsor.com
- Politics of Moldova; Political parties; Elections; A: The party had diverse classification on the political spectrum, as while most observers described it as left-wing,, some described it as centrist or centre-left, or right-wing.

The ȘOR Party (Romanian: Partidul „ȘOR” pronunciation: [ʃor]) was a pro-Russian populist political party in Moldova. Known from its foundation in 1998 until 2016 as the Socio-Political Movement "Equality" (Romanian: Mișcarea social-politică „Ravnopravie”), the party held Eurosceptic and Russophilic stances.

On 19 June 2023, the Șor Party was declared unconstitutional by the Constitutional Court of Moldova and has been banned ever since.

== History ==
The party was founded in 1998 by Moldovan politician Valerii Klimenko as the "Socio-Political Movement 'Equality'". At the 2005 Moldovan parliamentary election, the party won 2.8% of the popular vote but no seats. The party intended to participate to the 2014 Moldovan parliamentary election but later withdrew its list.

In 2015, the party decided to nominate Ilan Shor for Mayor of the town of Orhei. Shor, who was at that point in time under house arrest, won a majority of the votes in the first round of the election and subsequently became the leading figure within the party. In October 2016, Shor was elected president of the party, which was renamed Șor Party. In June 2017, the party President, Ilan Shor was sentenced to 7.5 years in jail for fraud. He broke house arrest and fled the country in 2019 whilst appealing the sentence. On 1 December 2018, the party joined the Alliance of Conservatives and Reformists in Europe.

In December 2018, the party created a model collective farm based on its own election programme in the Orhei region, dubbing it the "Commune of Dreams".

At the 2019 Moldovan parliamentary election, the party won 8.32% of votes and received seven parliamentary mandates, entering parliament for the first time in its history. The party organized a Victory Day parade in Chișinău on 9 May 2019.

=== 2022–2023 protests ===
The Șor Party was the main instigator of the 2022–2023 Moldovan protests.

=== Investigations into the party ===
On 8 November 2022, the Moldovan government requested the constitutional court to initiate proceedings for the outlawing of the party in Moldova, due to it allegedly promoting the interests of a foreign state (Russia) and harming the independence and sovereignty of the country.

On 13 April 2023, the appeal court doubled the sentence of party President Ilan Shor in a case linked to the theft of $1 billion in bank assets as well as money laundering, breach of trust, and fraud to 15 years in prison in absentia and froze his assets. Shor was living in Israel at the time of the court ruling after having fled Moldova in 2019. On 27 April 2023 a plenary session of the parliament voted to revoke Shor's parliamentary mandate. Shor appealed the decision to the Constitutional court but lost the appeal on 5 May 2023.

On 1 May 2023, the party's Vice President, Marina Tauber, was detained at the Chișinău International Airport while trying to leave the country for Israel via Turkey. She was arrested by the Anti-Corruption Prosecutor's Office on charges of illegally funding the party. She was sentenced to seven years and six months of prison on 30 September 2025; she had been living in Russia for almost a year by then, and was announced wanted for arrest in Moldova.

In May 2023 an investigation was launched into a suspected case of bribery of voters by the Șor Party during the 2023 Gagauz gubernatorial election.

On 5 August 2025, at the same hearing in which former Governor of Gagauzia Evghenia Guțul was sentenced, Svetlana Popan, former secretary of the Șor Party, was sentenced to six years in prison and barred from holding any positions related to the financial management of a party and from membership in any party for five years. Between September and November 2022, Popan illegally received 9.8 million lei, which she used to pay protesters, unofficially pay employees of the Șor Party's regional offices and other illicit activities. Popan stated she was innocent, and her lawyer said he would appeal her sentence.

=== Controversies ===
On 19 June 2023, the Șor Party was declared unconstitutional by the Constitutional Court of Moldova. Șor declared that the party will continue its activity and that it will contest in the next elections. Maria Zakharova, the spokeswoman of the Russian foreign ministry, said that the decision to declare the Sor Party unconstitutional contravened democratic principles. The court chairman Nicolae Roșca cited "an article in the constitution stating that parties must through their activities uphold political pluralism, the rule of law and the territorial integrity of Moldova." The current six serving MP's of the Șor Party being allowed to continue as independents.

On 31 July, the Moldovan parliament voted in favour of banning the leaders of the dissolved Șor Party – including Ilan Shor – from standing in elections for a period of five years. In October the Constitutional Court of Moldova ruled that Article 16 of the Electoral Code is unconstitutional and that former members of the Șor Party can stand for elections.

In August 2023, the Chance party became led by former journalist Alexei Lungu, affiliating with Shor. After the ruling, former members of the party largely moved to the Chance Party as well as the Revival Party, with the structures of these parties being largely formed by defectors from socialists and communist parties. The parties were described as populist and appealing to the most disadvantaged social groups in Moldova.

In March 2024, the Constitutional Court declared that while the party is deemed unconstitutional, individuals linked to the party may not be forbidden to run for office. Maia Sandu said she would "respect the ruling, but continue trying to ban its leaders."

=== Sanctions ===
On 26 October 2022, the Șor Party was sanctioned by the United States Department of Treasury over the association with Ilan Shor, who is also sanctioned.

== Ideology ==
The party was mostly described as left-wing, while others had also classified it as right-wing, centrist, or centre-left. Its 2019 programme introduced the following points:

- Free universal health care.
- Free education including higher education.
- Increasing the size and scope of disability benefits, maternity benefits and retirement pensions.
- The creation of modernised collective farms to work alongside the private sector.
- Active state intervention in the spheres of infrastructure, transport, energy, communications, housing, pharmaceuticals, etc.
- The nationalization of foreign-owned energy companies.
- A commitment to law and order including both reinstating the death penalty for particularly dangerous criminals and addressing the underlying socioeconomic issues that may cause crime.
- A commitment to Moldovan independence and military neutrality.

The opening paragraphs of the party's 2008 election programme stated that it viewed the average person's quality of life as superior under the Soviet Union when compared to modern times. It further stated that it viewed Moldova's alleged socio-economic problems as relating to Moldova's negative relationship with the Russian Federation. As of 2021, the party supported moving the capital to Orhei. It proposed to improve the socioeconomic situation of Moldovans by restoring Soviet economic policies, such as “measures to restore agriculture through the reconstitution of state farms” and “the nationalization of industry”. When in Parliament, the party voted together with the Party of Socialists of the Republic of Moldova. Economically, Şor spoke for a decisive role of the state in key sectors of the economy such as infrastructure, transport, communications, energy, housing and utilities, social trade, pharmaceuticals and ecology. It also postulated reducing energy tariffs and nationalization of energy companies owned by foreign capital.

The party attracted and appealed to the most disadvantaged groups of Moldovan society, including pensioners and rural dwellers. One of the means of the party's promotion were its own chain of stores Merishor, which was meant to target and aid the poorest. Merishor are referred to as "social supermarkets" by the party and commercialize low-price foodstuff for socially vulnerable groups; media reports alleged that the supermarket membership card was offered in exchange for joining the Şor party. Şor also focused on living cost crisis, including rising gas and energy prices as well as inflation, and organized protests against the Moldovan government and its economically liberal policies. The party also advocates for universal healthcare, free education, disability benefits and the creation of collective farms – in 2018, a party created its own collective farm, which it labelled the "Commune of the Dream".

In regards to foreign policy, Şor expressed positive attitudes towards Russia and Soviet Union, and appealed to the sense of nostalgia for Soviet times. The party declared itself for Moldovan independence and military neutrality, stating: “We are firm in terms of maintaining and unconditionally consolidating Moldovan statehood and its military neutrality.” The party opposes the European Union, and accused the envoys of the Moldovan government to the EU as acting against the interest of Moldova and for their own financial gain: “We have decided on our own, putting the interests of Moldova and its citizens first. This is exactly what Michalko [EU Ambassador to Chisinau] does not like. He wants the country’s sovereign decisions to be made in his office. That’s why Michalko spits on the presumption of innocence and attacks the Shor Party. He understands that we will not act in the interests of a self-proclaimed administrator from outside, but exclusively in the citizens’ interests.” Similarly, the party accused the Moldovan government of embezzling the funds received from the EU, with the party's representative Marina Tauber stating: “Peter Michalko has spoken recently about one billion euros invested in the Republic of Moldova. I go to villages very often and ask people if they have seen any investment. They say no. So I’m wondering in whose pockets this billion euros invested by the EU went.”

== Leadership ==
- Ilan Shor – President
- Valerii Klimenko – Honorary President; Member of the Chișinău Municipal Council
- Maria Albot – Secretary-General
- Marina Tauber – Vice President; MP

== Electoral results ==
=== Parliament ===
| Election | Leader | Votes | % | ± pp | Seats | +/– | Rank | Status |
|---|---|---|---|---|---|---|---|---|
| 2001 | Valerii Klimenko | 7,023 | 0.44% | – | 0 / 101 | – | 16th | Extra-parliamentary |
| 2005 | Valerii Klimenko | 44,129 | 2.83% | ▲2.39 | 0 / 101 | 0 | ▲6th | Extra-parliamentary |
| 2009 (April) | Valerii Klimenko | did not contest | | | | | | Extra-parliamentary |
| 2009 (July) | Valerii Klimenko | did not contest | | | | | | Extra-parliamentary |
| 2010 | Valerii Klimenko | 1,781 | 0.10% | ▲0.10 | 0 / 101 | 0 | ▲17th | Extra-parliamentary |
| 2014 | did not contest | | | | | | | Extra-parliamentary |
| 2019 | Ilan Shor | 117,779 | 8.32% | ▲8.32 | 7 / 101 | ▲7 | ▲4th | Opposition (until 14 November 2019) |
| 2019 | Ilan Shor | 117,779 | 8.32% | ▲8.32 | 7 / 101 | ▲7 | ▲4th | Support (14 November 2019 - 6 August 2021) |
| 2021 | Ilan Shor | 84,187 | 5.74% | ▼2.58 | 6 / 101 | ▼1 | ▲3rd | Opposition |

=== Presidency ===
| Election | Candidate | First round | | Second round | | Result |
| Election | Candidate | Votes | % | Votes | % | Result |
|---|---|---|---|---|---|---|
| 2020 | Violeta Ivanov | 87,542 | 6.49 | did not qualify | | Lost ✗ |
