= Vasile Bolea =

Moldovan politician (born 1982)

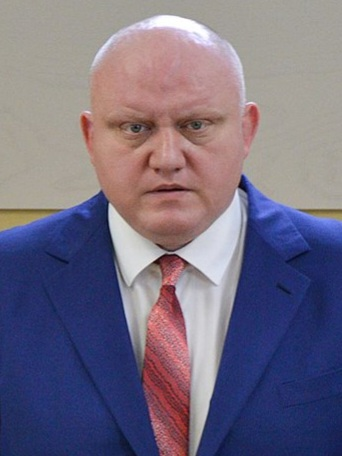
- Bolea in 2020

Member of the Moldovan Parliament
- In office 9 December 2014 – 16 October 2025
- Parliamentary group: Party of Socialists; Bloc of Communists and Socialists; Revival Party

Personal details
- Born: Moscow, Russian SFSR, Soviet Union
- Education: Ștefan cel Mare Police Academy

Vasile Bolea (born 27 October 1982) is a Moldovan politician, jurist and former rugby player, who was a member in the Parliament of Moldova from 2014 to 2025, elected on the list of the Party of Socialists of the Republic of Moldova (PSRM). Since 2019, he has been the chairman of the Legal, Appointments and Immunities Committee of the Parliament and is the secretary of the PSRM faction in the Parliament.

Before getting involved in politics, Vasile Bolea was a professional rugby player. Throughout his sports career, he played as a right-back, left-back, and also in the second line. He also played rugby sevens, being a starter in the Moldovan team that achieved its greatest international performance – the bronze medal at the 2007 European Championship.

== Sports career ==
Bolea began his rugby career with the Chișinău teams, then was selected for the Moldovan national team. After a while, he transferred to the Ukrainian team Aviator Kiev, with which in three years he won three medals in the Ukrainian championship, one bronze and two silver.

Also with Aviator Kiev, Vasile Bolea played three times in the final of the Ukrainian Rugby Cup, losing each time to HTZ Kharkov. Later, Bolea transferred to Credo Odesa, a team with which he won the national title in his first season.

Simultaneously with his sports career, Bolea studied and graduated from the Faculty of Law, later becoming a lawyer.

After a match for the Moldovan national team in Heidelberg, Bolea was close to a transfer to the German champions, but the transfer ultimately fell through due to bureaucratic procedures related to the visa application, which took a long time, preventing the move.

In 2013, Vasile Bolea ran for president of the Moldovan Rugby Federation, but was not admitted to the competition on the grounds that he had not paid his membership fees for several years and for these reasons was no longer part of the federation. He stated at the time that he had not paid his membership fee (100 lei per month) because the Rugby Federation had been operating illegally for 3 years at that time and that he would ask the relevant institutions to verify this.

== Political career ==
In the fall of 2012, Vasile Bolea, together with Vlad Batrîncea and Grigore Novac, filed a petition with the Chișinău Court of Appeal (on behalf of the "Soluția" Foundation) regarding the removal of the memorial stone in memory of the victims of the Soviet occupation installed in the Great National Assembly Square. The court then ruled that the petition filed against the Chișinău City Hall was unfounded. In the summer of 2014, while the signing of the Association and Free Trade Agreement between the Republic of Moldova and the European Union was taking place in Brussels, representatives of the Party of Socialists, led by Vasile Bolea and deputy Ion Ceban, organized a protest in front of the headquarters of the European Commission in Chișinău, chanting anti-European messages and advocating for the organization of a referendum on this issue in the Republic of Moldova.

Vasile Bolea was present at most of the protests organized by the PSRM in recent years, as well as at many debates during the 2014 election campaign. Along with his colleagues, he insisted on banning unionism by law and introducing the courses "History of Moldova" and "Moldovan Language" as mandatory subjects in schools. He also promised voters that if he came to power, the PSRM would halve gas, electricity and utility tariffs. In 4 years, it would create 112 enterprises and 200,000 jobs, offer higher scholarships and increase pensions by at least 20%.

Vasile Bolea is currently the president of the Chișinău Municipal Rugby Association. Bolea also holds the position of head of the legal department of the "Soluția" charity foundation, founded by Igor Dodon in September 2011. He is a member of the Republican Council of the PSRM.

In the Moldovan parliamentary elections of 30 November 2014, Bolea ran for the Socialist Party of the Republic of Moldova, from the 14th position on the list, after the results were tallied, becoming a deputy in the Parliament of the Republic of Moldova.

On 14 May 2015, Vasile Bolea and Andrei Neguța were delegated by the Socialist Party, along with Artur Reșetnicov and Vladimir Vitiuc (from the PSRM) and Dumitru Diacov and Sergiu Sîrbu (from the PSDE) – in a parliamentary working group on the draft law promoted by the communists, which aimed to approve the "permanent neutrality" of the Republic of Moldova.

On 19 May 2015, communist councilors in the Chișinău Municipal Council announced during a press conference that they would ask their colleagues in the PCRM parliamentary faction for help in withdrawing the parliamentary immunity of deputies Anatolie Labuneț, Grigore Novac, Ion Ceban, Vasile Bolea, and Marina Radvan, after they, together with several PSRM councilors and elected officials, caused fights at the Chișinău City Hall meeting and on a construction site in Chișinău.
