= Revival Party (Moldova) =

Revival Party Partidul „Renaștere” Партия «Возрождение»
- Abbreviation: PR
- President: Natalia Parasca
- Founders: Vadim Mișin; Vasile Tarlev; Oleg Babenco
- Founded: 29 October 2011
- Registered: 17 October 2012
- Split from: Party of Communists of the Republic of Moldova
- Headquarters: 44 Alexander Pushkin Street, Chișinău
- Membership (2014): 12,000
- Ideology: Social conservatism Christian left; Russophilia; Moldovenism; Eurasianism; Euroscepticism; Socialism
- Political position: Left-wing
- National affiliation: Victory (2024–present)
- European affiliation: ESN (Sofia Declaration)
- Colours: Red
- Parliament: 0 / 101
- District Presidents: 1 / 32

Website
- partidulrenastere.md

The Revival Party (Romanian: Partidul „Renaștere”, PR) is a pro-Russian political party in Moldova.

== Overview ==
The founding congress of party was held on 29 October 2011 and elected Vadim Mişin chairman of the party, former Prime Minister of Moldova Vasile Tarlev co-chairman and Oleg Babenco deputy сhairman. The congress was attended by 212 delegates from 28 districts of Moldova. After Mișin's death in 2016, the chairman of the party became his son, Serghei Mișin.

On 22 March 2023, former PSRM deputies Alexandr Nesterovschi, Irina Lozovan, Vasile Bolea and Alexandr Suhodolschi joined the party. Bolea declared that the party promotes the values of Eastern Orthodox Christianity, traditionalism, Moldovan nationalism, and that the party wants to become the largest left-wing force of Moldova. The party also wants the Russian language to become one of the state languages of Moldova. It has been considered a satellite party of the Șor Party since around this time. In August 2025, it was the last party of the last party of the Victory bloc to be barred from competing in the election and the Ministry of Justice announced that it seeks to dissolve the party.

== Notable members ==
- Vadim Mișin
- Vasile Tarlev
