= Greater Moldova =

Moldovan irredentist concept

"Greater Moldavia" as envisioned by Nikita Salogor. This state was to be under Soviet rule and also control the Maramureș and Năsăud counties since they were "an ancestral homeland of the Moldavians"

Greater Moldova or Greater Moldavia (Romanian: Moldova Mare; Moldovan Cyrillic: Молдова Маре) is an irredentist concept today used for the credence that the Republic of Moldova should be expanded with lands that used to belong to the Principality of Moldavia or were once inside its political orbit. Historically, it also meant the unification of the lands of the former principality under either Romania or the Soviet Union. Territories cited in such proposals always include Western Moldavia and the whole of Bessarabia, as well as Bukovina and the Hertsa region; some versions also feature parts of Transylvania, while still others include areas of Podolia, or Pokuttia in its entirety. In most of its post-Soviet iterations, "Greater Moldova" is associated with a belief that Moldovans are a distinct people from Romanians, and that they inhabit parts of Romania and Ukraine. It is a marginal position within the Moldovan identity disputes, corresponding to radical forms of an ideology polemically known as "Moldovenism".

The origins of the idea can be traced back to the 1812 annexation of Bessarabia by the Russian Empire, which was regarded as an injustice by the Principality's political elite. Their grievances, formulated as protests to the European powers, were only partly quelled by the brief reunification with southern Bessarabia (1856–1878). During that same interval, Moldavian demands fused into the larger agenda of Romanian nationalism, leading to the 1859 formation of the United Principalities and their shared aspiration toward a Greater Romania. Support for a Greater or Unified Moldavia was manifest among a subgroup of Romanian nationalists who also endorsed regional autonomy. The more particular goal of a restored Greater Moldavia, independent and fully separated from Wallachia, survived in this setting until the 1870s, being encouraged in its own aspirations by the forgeries of Constantin Sion.

Upon the end of World War II, the idea of Greater Moldova was briefly considered by the political apparatus of the Soviet Union. Initial plans were drafted by Ana Pauker and Gherasim Rudi, who wanted Soviet Moldavia (already comprising most of Bessarabia) enlarged westward toward the Siret, with Iași for its capital; their project was vetoed by Joseph Stalin. As a member of the Soviet Moldavian leadership, Nikita Salogor made other concrete proposals; his version made explicit territorial demands on both Romania and the Ukrainian SSR, generating controversy with the latter. Salogor's project was shelved, but, through the likes of Artiom Lazarev, some of its core assumptions were replicated into the 1970s. A nostalgia for the Principality was also implicit in the Soviet celebration of "Moldovan" figures who had lived in Romania. Once Moldova declared its independence in 1991, some core tenets of Greater Moldovan irredentism were tentatively embraced by both the Party of Communists and the Party of Socialists.

== History ==
=== Background ===
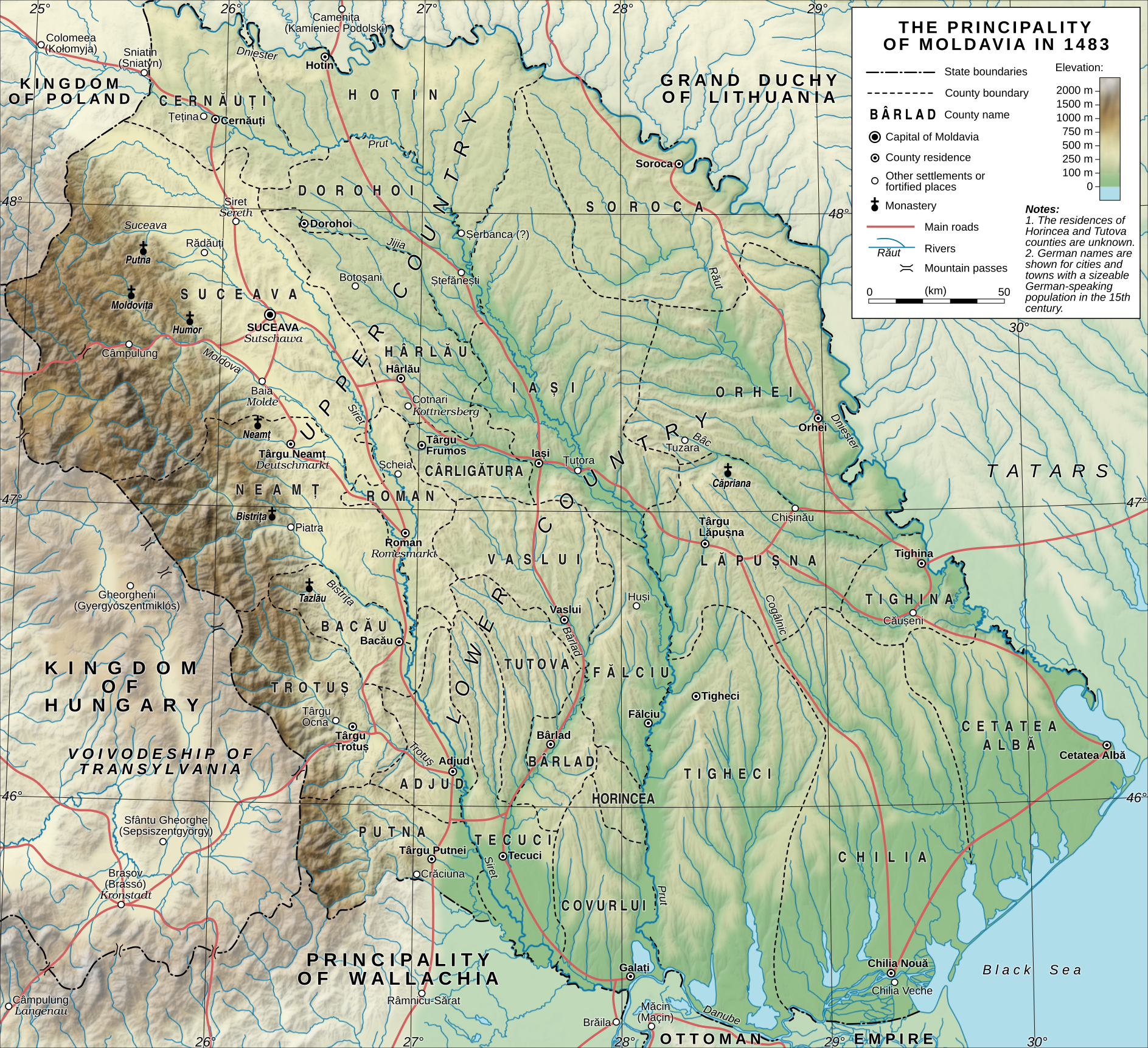
Map of the Principality of Moldavia in 1483 under Stephen the Great. The principality would eventually also control Pokuttia for a short period

The Principality of Moldavia was founded in the 14th century after nobles from the neighboring voivodeship at Maramureș (notably Bogdan I and Dragoș) succeeded in creating an autonomous and later independent polity in areas claimed by the Kingdom of Hungary. Its history was intertwined with that of Wallachia, the other Romanian principality; in the 1490s, Jakob Unrest, chronicling the rule of Stephen the Great, used "Greater Moldavia" as a byword for Basarab the Old's realm in Wallachia. Immediately after reaching its maximum territorial extent under Stephen, the Moldavian principality became an Ottoman vassal in the 16th century. This tutelage engendered territorial changes, with direct annexations performed by the Sublime Porte in the southern areas. The steppe areas of the south fell to the Nogai Tatars (the "Budjak Horde"), eventually folded within the Ottomans' Silistra Eyalet. The region as a whole became known as the Budjak, but continued to house communities of Moldavian Christians; tradition holds that its northern border with Moldavia was settled c. 1700 by Halil Pasha.

The waning of Ottoman military power also brought its European provinces under threat of encroachment by the Habsburg monarchy. To obtain Habsburg neutrality during the Russian war of 1768, the Porte ceded 70,186 jugăre (400 square kilometers, or 154 square miles) of Moldavian land. This surface was annexed to the Transylvanian Military Frontier, manned by Hungarian-speaking Székelys, resulting in a lasting controversy as to whether or not it belongs to "Székely Land". A more sizable northern region, thereafter known as "Bukovina", was annexed to the Habsburg realm in Galicia in 1774. As noted by contemporary reports, peasants in that region were opposed to the "breakup in two of Moldavia's body", and hoped that Moldavia as a whole would be reunited under the House of Austria. Similar ideas were espoused by a Hungarian nationalist poet of the day, Mihály Csokonai. He wrote about the lands and people of Greater Moldavia in his Marosvásárhelyi gondolatok, in which he hopes the entire region would unify with the Kingdom of Hungary—mainly as a way of ensuring that the Csángós of Moldavia would be politically joined with other Hungarians:

Vajha Moldvának is kies parlagjai,
Ameddig terjednek a Pontus habjai,
Magyar Koronánknak árnyékába menne,
S a csángó magyar is polgártársunk lenne!

Translation:

I wish that the bleak Moldavian lands
All the way to the waves of Pontus would extend,
We could live in unity under the Holy Crown
And our fellow Csángó citizens would to us be bound!

On the other side of the border, Prince Grigore Ghica had hoped to persuade the Ottomans that they should retake Bukovina for Moldavia. As reported by Austrian diplomat Thugut de Paula, "the Moldavians and all other of Ghica's creatures [...] apply all their zeal to depicting the voluntary cession of such a rich area of the country as an act of extraordinary weakness". In Bukovina District, which came to cradle some of the first forms of Romanian nationalism under a Habsburg government, Romanian folklore identified "Greater Moldavia" as the Ottoman-held areas, with Bukovina itself referred to as "Lesser Moldavia" (Moldova Mică).

The Moldavian areas east of the Prut River, which came to be known as "Bessarabia", were annexed by the Russian Empire in 1812. Though organized as a Russian governorate, its kinship with the other parts of Moldavia was not explicitly denied by Russian authorities. They maintained in place the boyar aristocracy, including many families which owned lands on both sides of the border. Russian occupation incidentally reunited Bessarabia with the Budjak. However, the circumstances of Russian rule and the effective partition were seen as unacceptable by various boyar delegates, including the likes of Ioniță Sion and Grigorașcu Sturdza, who pleaded for protection by either the French Empire or Austria. In their official protests, they referred to the regions as "Moldavia's heartland", noting that they preferred Ottoman rule. During the six years which followed annexation, Bessarabians, especially those of Orgeyevsky District, staged popular rallies against the new administration, with as many as 5,000 Moldavian and Gypsy families fleeing across the Prut, into the more familiar Principality. At least one folkloric record from the Budjak, known as Frunză verde lozioară, decried Bessarabia's passage into "Russian slavery" and looked forward to liberation by "our brethren".

By the mid-19th century, the ideal of recovering Bessarabia and Bukovina for Moldavia was already merging with the larger agenda of unifying them with all lands inhabited by ethnic Romanians, in particular Wallachia and Transylvania. This goal was detailed by Mihail Kogălniceanu in his 1843 speech at Academia Mihăileană: "I view as my country everywhere on earth where Romanian is spoken, and as national history the history of all of Moldavia before her fracturing, that of Wallachia, and that of our brothers in Transylvania." In June 1848, upon hearing news of the successful uprising in Wallachia, Bessarabian exile Alecu Russo reported that the moment had come for a revolution to seize "all of us, and all Romanians alike". Russo was in favor of establishing a "great Romanian country" with its border on the Dniester, explicitly against the smaller goal of reuniting "Moldavia with her daughters". Within the next generation of Romanian nationalists, scholar Bogdan Petriceicu Hasdeu, himself a refugee from Bessarabia (and possibly radicalized there under the influence of Narodniks), alerted Romanians to the fact that "Bessarabia" was a name fabricated by Russian sources, and that the province as a whole had "existed within Moldavia's ancient borders."

The rump Moldavian principality merged with Wallachia in 1859, thus forming the United Principalities as the first modern Romanian state. Its establishment was encouraged by the Treaty of Paris, from which the new country also gained southern Bessarabia (comprising only parts of the Budjak). For Moldavians and Romanians in general, that partial restoration constituted a "platonic consolation", by implying that the 1812 takeover had been illegal; the Moldavian militia moved into the region to the tune of Vasile Alecsandri's March of Bessarabia, which boasted a return on "the land we once owned". By the time of its reintegration, the area was heavily populated by Bulgarians and Gagauz, who formed pockets of resistance to Romanian rule; following the Romanian War of Independence and the Treaty of Berlin, these were retaken by Russia, with Romania receiving Northern Dobruja as a compromise.

In parallel, the Principalities experienced episodes of obstruction or sedition by those who still identified with Moldavian statehood. Already opposing union (though not kinship) with Wallachia in the 1840s and 1850s, some Moldavian boyars advocated for the reintegration of Bessarabia within an independent Moldavia. Examples of this discourse include Constantin Sion and his historical forgery, the so-called Chronicle of Huru, published by Gheorghe Asachi in 1856. The work was investigated, months after surfacing, by a pan-Romanian commission under Kogălniceanu, and widely discredited as a result. However, it was again republished in 1879, possibly with political intent; its sponsor may have been the Moldavian secessionist Teodor Boldur-Lățescu. The cause of Moldavian statehood was also embraced by Simion Bărnuțiu, who "supported Union as a confederation, with Moldavia as a distinct juridical person, with her own ancient rights, her history, her inalienable demands on Bukovina and Bessarabia".

=== Greater Romania as Greater Moldavia ===
==== Development of the concept ====
The establishment in 1867 of Austria-Hungary included the autonomous Duchy of Bukovina in the Austrian dominion. In 1875, the latter prepared for celebration of the annexation's centennial, causing an uproar among pan-Romanian nationalists and supporters of Moldavian territorial integrity. That year, Kogălniceanu printed a work which exposed the circumstances of Bukovina's cession, and which noted: "when not in a position to grab a country in its entirety, [Austria] would be content with bits and even morsels". Sion and Bărnuțiu's approaches were also contrasted by poet Mihai Eminescu of Botoșani, who took up Romanian nationalism, including using racial anthropology to prove the antiquity of Romanians in Bukovina. In 1876, he referred to Bukovina as the stolen "maternal beehive of unified Moldavia", commending Prince Ghica for his attempts to resist the annexation. With his extended critique of the Berlin Treaty, Eminescu made note of Bessarabia as traditionally integrated with Moldavia as a "distinct country".

In 1878, shortly after Romania emerged as victorious from the war of independence, public opinion was left indignant by the forced cession of southern Bessarabia to Russia. In issuing a formal protest against this measure, diplomat Dimitrie Ghica noted: "From the most ancient times, the Dniester has been Moldavia's natural border". Proposals for the restoration of Moldavia continued after 1878, although mostly as a large autonomous or merely traditional entity, and within the Romanian nationalist ideology. Political elites from the newly proclaimed Kingdom of Romania promoted instead the concept of "Greater Romania", as a country that would encompass all populations it considered to be ethnic Romanian. This would include, among others, Bukovina and Bessarabia. In one of his political texts of the 1870s, Eminescu elaborated on counterfactual history, describing a unified Romania where Moldavia, rather than Wallachia, had taken the nationalist lead. His imaginary state, ruled upon by the Mușatins, would have been modernized at a slower pace, but with more political acumen and better overall results. In territorial terms: "the [Crimean] war of '54 would have brought us Bessarabia, that of '59—Bukovina, and the one in '66—Transylvania." The subsequent period saw Romanian public opinion divided between those who wished to fight Austria-Hungary over Transylvania and Bukovina, and those who worried about Bessarabia and the continued threat of Russian imperialism. A left-wing nationalist, George Panu, argued in 1892 that Russia "will be seeking a sure way to rob us of Moldavia down to the Siret."

Political and cultural cooperation between the distinct provinces, with special reference to a reconstituted Moldavia, also appeared in other contexts. A manuscript left by the Bukovinian folklorist Simion Florea Marian, who died in 1907, noted that: "cut off from Moldavia, like a daughter from her mother, [Bukovina] sobs over her torments. Forgotten for a while, and even now unfamiliar to Romanians from the other provinces, she has developed, as much as it was possible, [...] in all branches of national culture, by carving out her own path." In Bessarabia, cultural isolation gave way to Russification—as noted in 1888 by the Greco-Bessarabian merchant Pericles Rodocanachi, "not since 1812 have we witnessed such brutal efforts to Russianize Romanian peasants from this part of Moldavia that has been kidnapped by the Moskals". By 1906, Pavel Krushevan, who championed Russian nationalism in Bessarabia, had accused Pavel Dicescu, a leader of the "Romaniaphile" boyars, of scheming to "adjoin Bessarabia with Moldavia." A moment of pan-Romanian solidarity in protest occurred in 1912, when Russia celebrated the centennial of Bessarabia's annexation. In Bessarabia itself, Gheorghe Tudor defied Russian censorship with a short-lived magazine, Făclia Țării. In it, Tudor spoke of "Moldavians from across the Prut" and "Romanians from across the Prut" being more enlightened than the "Bessarabians", whom Russian rule had left uneducated; he also noted: "Romanians [...] have brought together Moldavians from all countries to increase the Moldavians' education" (Romînii [...] au făcut o unire între moldovenii din toate țările ca sî lărgeascî învățătura între moldoveni).

During the first two years of World War I, while Romania maintained neutrality, a political battle took place between supporters of the Central Powers and the Entente. The former category included Bessarabian leftists such as Axinte Frunză, who wanted Romania to focus her efforts on defeating the Russians; at the time, Frunză revived claims that Russia intended to annex most of Romanian Moldavia, down to the Siret. The Romanian Kingdom ultimately entered the war in 1916 as en Entente ally. This move took place under the condition that other territories, precisely Bukovina and Transylvania (both in Austria-Hungary), be handed over to it; Bessarabia was excluded from this. During the subsequent Romanian Campaign, debates still split Romanian nationalists among those who favored the Entente, and therefore unification with Transylvania, and partisans of the Central Powers, who stood for recovering Bessarabia. According to historian Nicolae Iorga, a native Moldavian who sided with the former camp, his adversaries were "exploiting" Moldavian irrendentism: "They cut the Romanian ideal meridian-wise and have said: Moldavians, don't think of Transylvania, it's your duty to think of Bessarabia! [...] And that's not because they had longed for either Bessarabia or Transylvania, but because they make use, and will always readily make use, of some of our right, so as to destroy the remainder of our right."

Russia's February 1917 Revolution came with the gradual emancipation of Bessarabians—now commonly referred to as "Moldavians", totum pro parte. As one of the activists who agitated during the uprising, C. V. Soare openly declared, in his speech at Bolgrad, that all Moldavians were Romanians, and also that Bessarabia had been "ripped out of Moldavia—whose ancestral customs it preserves". In defining the Moldavians' identity during spring 1917, poet-activist Alexei Mateevici considered them a branch of the Romanian nation, and agreed that they could also be called Romanians. However, he insisted that Bessarabia was somewhat distinct in preserving a "Moldavian language"—explaining that this meant the archaic Romanian once spoken throughout the Principality, but vanished in its non-Russian half under the pressures of Latinization. The October Revolution created a power vacuum that allowed Bessarabians to consider unification with Romania. In endorsing this movement, the Bessarabian exile Constantin Stere noted that same month: "Romania has not only the historical right, but also a duty [Stere's italics] toward Bessarabia, and actually toward Moldavia as a whole, to demand that she be granted the counties east of the Prut."

==== Interwar integration ====
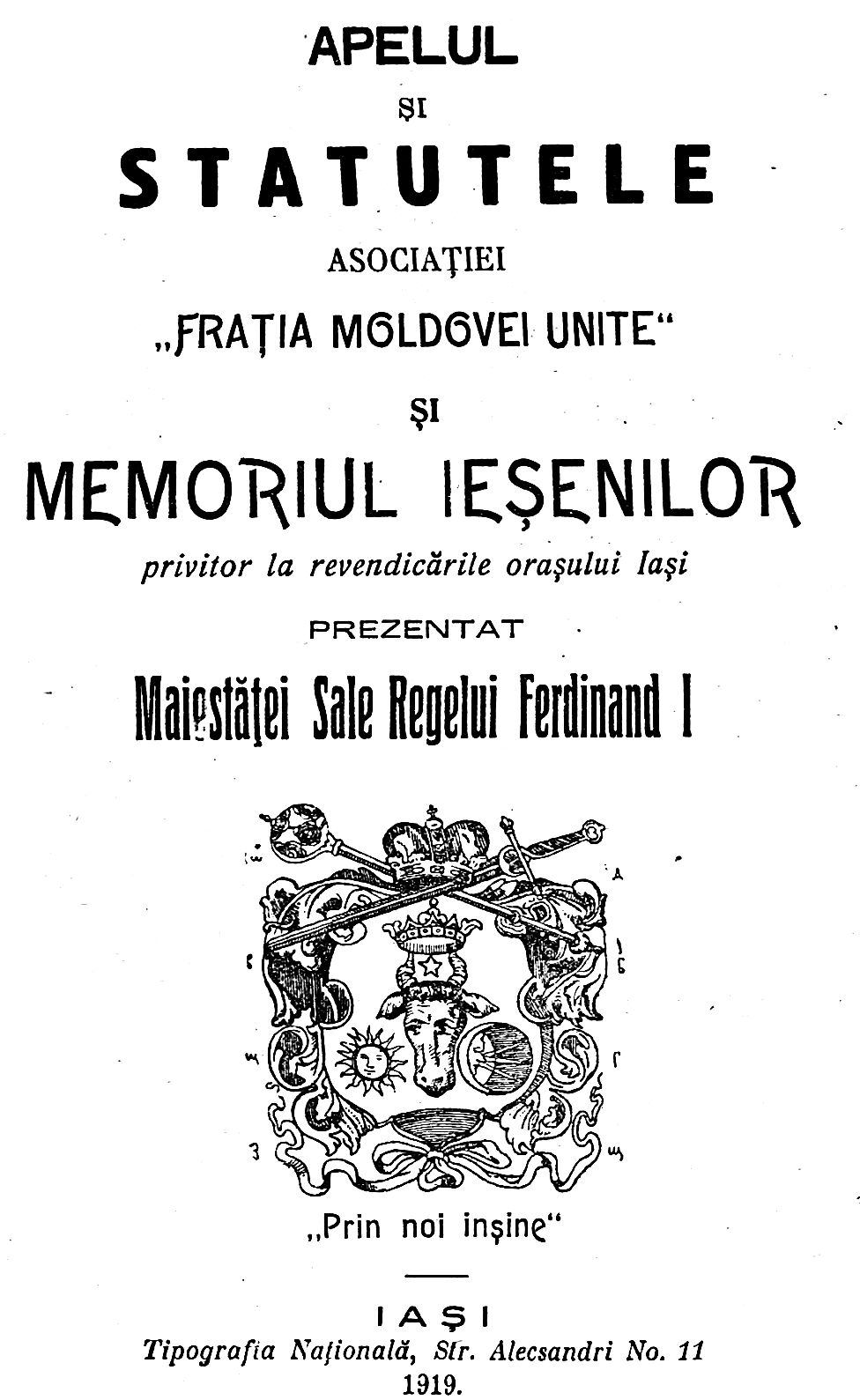
Founding charter of the Brotherhood of Unified Moldavia, published at Iași in 1919. Featuring a Moldavian coat of arms taken from the 1680 Psalter

Sfatul Țării (the "Country Council") declared Bessarabia's autonomy, nominally within the Russian Republic, on 15 December 1917, thereby establishing the Moldavian Democratic Republic. Following a Romanian military intervention, this Bessarabian state declared full independence, then union with Romania, in 1918. Since during that stage of the war the Romanian Kingdom had been pushed out of Wallachia and was only in control of Western (Romanian) Moldavia, the unification was also a Moldavian reintegration—itself complete when Bukovina joined in November 1918. During these transformations, the Bukovinian General Council received a three-man Bessarabian delegation, headed by Ion Pelivan, which alternated messages of Romanian brotherhood and Greater Moldavian resurgence. One of the delegates, Grigore Cazacliu, wrote that the successive losses of Bukovina and Bessarabia had been days of mourning "in the history of the Romanian nation and first of all in the history of Moldavians." Quoting from Eminescu's nationalist poem Doina, Cazacliu expressed the vision of Stephen the Great returning from his grave to bring about unity between the "young lads of Bukovina and Bessarabia", who had been caught up in a war that required them to shoot each other. The union resolution, read out by Iancu Flondor on 28 November 1918, spoke of both a reunification with "Stephen's Moldavia" and a larger design for bringing together "all the Romanian lands [...] into one national unitary state".

Sextil Pușcariu, who represented the Bukovinian Council in negotiations with the Romanian government, also recalls meeting with the opposition People's League. At the time, Pușcariu notes, the League's A. C. Cuza "envisaged regionalist politics, in order to resuscitate, within unified Romania, a Moldavia enlarged by the addition of Bessarabia and Bukovina." Formed in December of that year, the Brotherhood of Unified Moldavia, staffed by nationalists such as Iorga, Cuza, and Petru Poni, demanded a recognition of regional autonomy. One of Iorga's articles described "Unified Moldavia" as comprising Western Moldavia, Bessarabia and Bukovina, as well as the easternmost reaches of Transylvania. After the Great Union, which consolidated the Romanian Kingdom as the embodiment of Greater Romania, the regionalist political initiative was followed by cultural ventures. In 1920, archeologist Ioan Andrieșescu wrote about the need to unify the historical and ethnographic traditions of Bessarabia, Bukovina, and other parts of Moldavia, by forming a "central museum of Greater Moldavia".

Two years later, Poni organized in Iași the Agriculture and Cottage Industry Expo of Unified Moldavia, which also produced Constantin Kristescu's medal, an allegory of three female figures: Bukovina and Bessarabia returning to Moldavia. In a 1924 address, Alexandru Slătineanu, as rector of Iași University, noted that the city had become a cultural capital of "unified Moldavia", adding: "Moldavians under Austrian dominance, Moldavians under Russian dominance – they are again flocking to Iași to bask in the light of science. Iași has the unwieldy task of serving the fiber of souls that have been alienated, in one case by a strong German culture, in the other by a charming Slavic influence." However, the regionalist school was criticized by Bessarabia's Paul Gore. In February 1923, he wrote: "There are no more Moldavians, who would imagine that the Principalities' union signifies slavery, there are no more Wallachians, who would fear Moldavian rivalry! But it took a lot of time for things to end up this way [...]. Today we see only regionalist tendencies, which sometimes hide under the natural guise of a longing for decentralization, being formed and manifesting themselves contrary to our national interests."

During the interwar, the regionalist question of Moldavia and Bessarabia belonging to each other seeped into Romanian literature. Novelist Mihail Sadoveanu's 1919 visit to Bessarabia was described in his Orhei și Soroca. Note de drum, which celebrates the reunification of Moldavia within Romania, insisting on the liberties recovered by the Bessarabians in this new political arrangement. The work makes ample references to the "Moldavian language", and is itself written in an archaic and regional dialect. His later books suggest the unity of Moldavia as a distinct cultural space, though they also distinguish Bessarabia as its periphery, a zone "not yet harmed by the evils of civilization." Some Bessarabian Romanians who expressed sympathy for the Romanians in Ukraine began referring to Moldavia as a larger region, whose eastern border they identified as being the Southern Bug. The slogan of "Moldavia down to the Bug" was used as the title of a magazine put out in 1922 by teacher Elefterie Negel (reportedly closed down after "foreign interventions").

In late 1929, the National Peasants' Party and its Maniu cabinet imposed some concessions to regional identities, instituting regional directorates for the various historical provinces. This decision was criticized by Iorga, partly because it distinguished between Moldavia and Bessarabia, preserving the latter only through the "criminal folly of some madmen." The move also caused indignation on other circles, mainly because it tied Putna to the Wallachian directorate, while also extending the Bukovina directorate deeper into Moldavia (it had annexed Baia and Dorohoi). An all-Moldavian regionalism, which aimed to bridge the gap between the former principality and its Bessarabian province while also remaining compatible with Greater Romania, was embraced in the 1930s by the editors of Cuget Moldovenesc. This monthly journal, published from Bălți and later from Iași, had lasting polemics with the Bessarabian autonomists at Viața Basarabiei. The model was also followed in sports, with the Romanian Football Federation annexing the regional teams of Bessarabia to Moldavia in 1929. Ten years later, Vladimir Cavarnali was editing a magazine called Moldavia from Bolgrad in the Budjak. By then, Iași-based satirist Păstorel Teodoreanu had poked fun at the previous generations of Moldavian–Bessarabian unionists with his mock-historical narrative, Pursângele căpitanului. Taking place in the 1850s, it shows an inebriated Costake Zippa leading the Moldavian cavalry into Bessarabia, where they reoccupy his father's wine cellar and plant the "red-and-blue Moldavian flag."

=== Within the Romanian–Soviet conflict ===
==== Early stages ====
Emblem of the Transnistria Governorate, featuring a version of Stephen the Great's seal

The Bessarabian–Romanian merger was not accepted by the newly Soviet Russia (which later formed the Soviet Union). Thus, in 1924, the Moldavian Autonomous Soviet Socialist Republic (Moldavian ASSR) was created as a homeland for ethnic Moldovans; carved out of the Ukrainian SSR and historical Podolia, it was entirely outside the 1812 Principality—but nominally also included Bessarabia, which was considered under foreign occupation. Part of its bureaucracy, including republican leader Grigoriy Stary, was initially receptive to the notion that Moldavians were not wholly distinct from the Romanian population. They encouraged cultural borrowings from Bessarabia and Romania proper, looking forward to a reunification of Moldavian lands under Soviet rule. This group was defeated by the linguist Leonid Madan and his Association of Bessarabians, who promoted instead a "Moldavian language" based on heavily divergent and Russified Romanian dialects. Soviet authorities subsequently promoted Moldovan culture and language, emphasizing the Moldovans' distinctness from the Romanians; critics of such ideas referred to this movement as "Moldovenism". Writers who supported the more generically Moldavian–Romanian version were executed during, or shortly after, the Great Purge of the latter 1930s. Examples include Nistor Cabac, Dmitrii Milev, and Filimon Săteanu.

Bessarabia, along with Northern Bukovina and the Hertsa region, was ultimately taken over by the Soviet Union in 1940, following an ultimatum issued to the Romanian government. The Moldavian territories under Soviet authority were reorganized: the Budjak and Northern Bessarabia, as well as Northern Bukovina and Hertsa, were assigned to the Ukrainian SSR, while the rest of Bessarabia and six of the thirteen raions of the Moldavian ASSR (known as Transnistria since the beginning of the 1990s) were amalgamated into a new Soviet republic, the Moldavian Soviet Socialist Republic (Moldavian SSR). In April 1941, a Siguranța spy operating on Bessarabian territory had it that Red Army personnel were openly discussing of a new mission—namely, the partial occupation of Romanian Moldavia, with the Siret as a new border.

Romania briefly recovered the lost territories in the east after joining the Axis invasion of the Soviet Union. During these maneuvers, in July 1941, Romanian intellectuals in the former Moldavian ASSR and beyond asked for their native areas to be incorporated with Romania. Their manifesto spoke of a "reunified Moldavia, all the way down to the Bug". In 1943, Ion Antonescu's regime could claim to have restored "united Moldavia between the Nistru, the Ceremuș, and the Carpathians", though much of historical Moldavia remained unincorporated, as the military-run Bessarabia and Bukovina governorates. Organized from areas located entirely to the east of historical Moldavia, the Transnistria Governorate was sometimes referred to as a part of "Moldavia's lands, forever reunited." In a 1941 letter, diplomat Raoul Bossy referred to the prospect of "restoring Moldavia", under Romanian rule, to its farthest reaches. He identified these with the reigns of Alexander I (1400–1432), when Moldavia held Pokuttia, and George Ducas (1680s), who ruled in Right-bank Ukraine.

The claim also resonated with scholars. In December 1941, archeologist Radu Vulpe opined that the Cucuteni culture of the Neolithic "can be considered a spiritual product of Moldavia", for being centered on what was to become "Stephen the Great's country"; "one can surely speak of a great ethnographic unity of the people who have created and developed [this culture], and who gave Moldavia what was clearly its first era of brilliance." At a conference in 1943, schoolteacher Victor Andrei called those areas of Podolia and Yedisan "something of a Moldavian march, closely linked to the Metropolis of Proilavia as early as the 16th century."

During early 1944, the Soviets began a large counteroffensive and reached the border of Bessarabia. This prompted Soviet Premier Joseph Stalin to allow the recruitment of Bessarabian politicians, held in Soviet concentration camps, for a reformed government of the Moldavian SSR; examples included Elefterie Sinicliu. The mission was coordinated through a group of communists: Ana Pauker, Alexandru Mîță, Gherasim Rudi, Gheorghe Stere, and Ipolit Derevici. At the time, Pauker, supported by Mîță, Rudi and Stere, envisioned an enlarged republic, which stretched down to the Siret and had Iași as its capital. Derevici alone opposed the plan, and ultimately defeated it by communicating Pauker's intentions to Stalin and Nikita Khrushchev, who overruled Pauker. By mid 1944, Bessarabia, Northern Bukovina and Hertsa had been fully retaken by the Soviet Army, which also advanced into Romania. At the time, Antonescu reportedly spoke of the need to "continue fighting alongside the Germans, even at the risk of losing all of Moldavia, Bessarabia, and part of Dobruja". Some members of the Romanian military, including Constantin Sănătescu, were infuriated by Antonescu's "mistaken hypotheses", and joined a conspiracy which ended with Antonescu's arrest in August 1944.

==== Romanian and Soviet communism ====
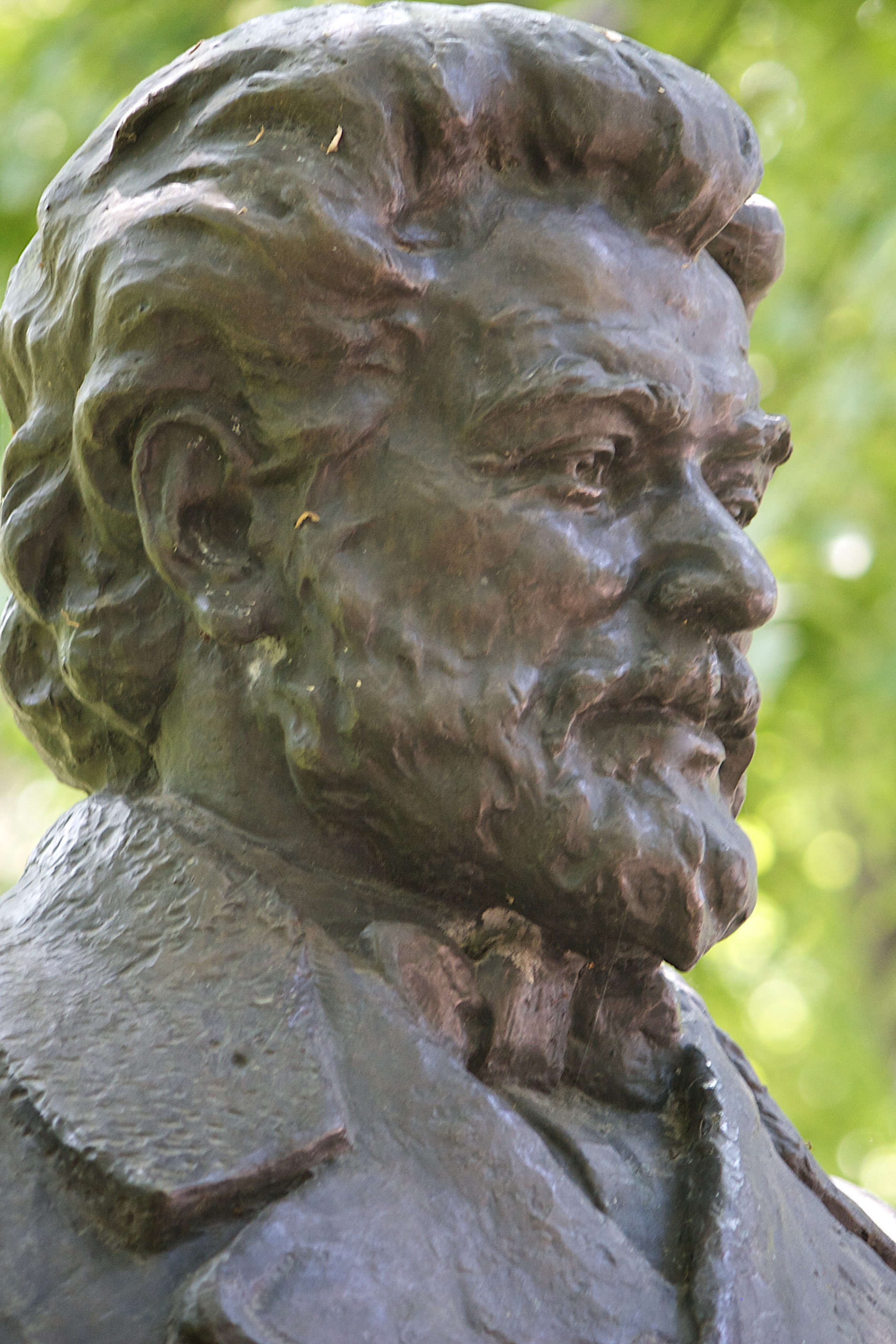
Ion Creangă's bust in the Alley of Classics

As a result of the coup, Romania made peace with the Allies; the Moldavian SSR had by then been restored, and its leadership reinstated. Nikita Salogor, a Soviet Moldavian politician, took this occasion to begin an irredentist campaign. According to him, the Moldavian SSR had to expand its borders to those of the "historic Moldavia" (that is, the Principality of Moldavia's borders), incorporating territories from Romania and the Ukrainian SSR. This also included territories that never belonged to the old principality, more precisely the Maramureș and Năsăud counties, perceived as "the cradle of the Moldavian people" since Bogdan I and Dragoș came from there. In 1946, in their secret correspondence with the Soviet central leadership, the leaders of the Moldavian SSR promoted these proposals proclaiming the need to "free [the Moldavian lands] from the yoke of the Romanian boyars and capitalists". Salogor would later send a letter to Stalin, defending the "unity of the Moldavians" and the economic importance of the Budjak. However, Salogor was later demoted and removed from his political posts. This is thought to have been due to his claims over Ukrainian lands, perceived as something unacceptable and that could "justify" the earlier Romanian territorial claims over those lands. These were the fears of some Soviet politicians who possibly insisted on Stalin that he should be sacked.

In the larger context of cultural identity, Moldovan intellectuals were pushed to discuss local writings in terms of "Moldovan literature", which included "Romanian writers from earlier periods that had been born throughout greater Moldavia." One prominent case was that of Neamț County native Ion Creangă, who was defined as a classic of Moldovan literature and a "son of the Moldovan people"; some references to him as a Romanian writer were only allowed during the Khrushchev Thaw of 1955–1968. This trend was first encouraged by Camenca native Artiom Lazarev as Minister of Education (1947–1951) and of Culture (1953–1963)—his contribution included commissioning the Alley of Classics complex in Chișinău, which displays the busts of Creangă, Alecsandri, Eminescu, and Dimitrie Cantemir.

In Romania, a prolonged Soviet occupation ensured rule by the Romanian Communist Party and the People's Democratic Front (FDP). Around 1946, rumors circulated that the FDP leader, Petru Groza, had promised to stay in power "even if he should hand Stalin [all of] Moldavia, down to the Siret." After 1948, the country was officially a socialist state within the Eastern bloc, but the Soviet approach to the Moldavian issue continued to generate controversy. As a supporter of Romanian national communism, which resented foreign tutelage, Gheorghe Apostol suggests that Romanian integrity and independence were preserved by Gheorghe Gheorghiu-Dej, who led the Communist Party for twenty years (1944–1964). As part of this vision, Apostol argues that Moldavian reunification within the Soviet Union was only narrowly avoided when Gheorghiu-Dej defeated his "anti-national" competitor, Ștefan Foriș.

The Gheorghiu-Dej regime frowned upon Greater Moldavian ideas in any of their incarnations. During the 1956 commemoration of Stephen the Great, Iași University student Alexandru Zub created a map of "historic Moldavia", clearly showing its dominions in Bessarabia and Bukovina, and tried to have it displayed inside his alma mater. The project was halted by the Union of Communist Youth, represented locally by Ion Iliescu; Zub was soon after arrested by the Securitate. In mid-1963, an atlas on Soviet economy was published in Romania, with one map showing Moldovans as inhabiting parts of Romania, extending westward toward the Siret. This faux-pas caused an uproar in the higher party echelons, including an intervention by Nicolae Ceaușescu and Leonte Răutu in their capacity as official censors. Also in Romania, Eminescu's adoption into Soviet Moldavian culture was reviewed as a "confiscation" by his nephew Gheorghe Eminescu, who maintained a private "cult of Greater Romania".

The full adoption of national communist tenets in the mid-1960s, when Ceaușescu took over as leader of Romania, allowed local historians to believe that mention of a Romanian "Greater Moldavia" would again be tolerated. Communist censorship intervened shortly after, to curb any mention of Bessarabia in the popular history journal, Magazin Istoric; in December 1967, editors had to remove a reference to "the whole of Moldavia", which had been written into an article about Stephen the Great. During the early 1970s, Ceaușescu encouraged various exceptions to this norm: he allowed references to the ancient Moldavian borders in a historical film about Dimitrie Cantemir, and quipped that "we should send it to Brezhnev"; also then, the Romanian Central Committee protested against any Soviet description of Eminescu as a "Moldavian poet". In 1983, commenting on Ceaușescu's speeches about national sovereignty, historian Mircea Mușat noted that the foreigners' encroachment on the Romanian lands had only registered two lasting victories: "Only two bits of Moldavia's body have been annexed [respectively] by the Habsburg and Tsarist empires (the Upper Country and Bessarabia), although there were various plans for the complete annexation of all Romanian territories."

Meanwhile, calls for returning parts of the Ukrainian SSR were being silenced within the Soviet communist apparatus, and were instead taken up by Moldavian dissidents such as Gheorghe Ghimpu and Alexandru Usatiuc-Bulgăr. In 1966, another opponent of the Soviet regime, Gheorghe Muruziuc, declared at a Moldavian Communist Party meeting: "in 1940, without any rationale, Bessarabia was torn out of Romania and incorporated into the USSR as the Moldavian SSR. With this violent act, the Moldavian people was split apart, with part of it in Romania and the other—in the USSR. Sooner or later, the Moldavian SSR will either secede from the USSR and come to function as a sovereign state, or it will unite with Romania." Among the communists who espoused similar ideas on this topic, Lazarev lost his position at the Ministry in 1963, having been accused of "nationalism". As rector of Chișinău University, where he had been reinstated in 1968, he expressed support for Greater Moldavia, describing the 1812 annexation of Bessarabia as a traumatic event. He repeated this claim in the 1980s, when he openly rejected standard Soviet historiography by noting that "there was nothing progressive" in the original Russian annexation, by which "the Moldavian State and people found themselves artificially dismembered".

== Contemporary usage ==
=== 1990s revivalism ===
In late 1990, faced with the disintegration of the Soviet Union, President Mikhail Gorbachev specifically mentioned "Greater Moldavia" and "Greater Ukraine" as samples of unacceptable irredentism. By then, the revival of Romanian–Moldovan unionism was manifest in events such as the "Bridge of Flowers". A report on the latter event, penned by Dumitru Nicodim in Dreptatea, referred to the Prut as "the river which temporarily and artificially splits Moldavia's body". Opposition to Soviet rule was being led by the Popular Front of Moldova, which made use of the Romanian tricolor, then formed units of volunteers engaged in the Transnistria War. According to reports originally published by Smena magazine in December 1990, its leadership was undecided about supporting Romanian nationalism. Smena claimed to have interviewed a junior leader of the Front, Ilie Ilașcu, who still held the belief that Moldovans "are not the same as their Romanian brothers, they are only related to them." Ilașcu was also quoted as saying that his goal was the restoration of Greater Moldavia as it existed under Stephen the Great, including by retaking the breakaway Gagauz Republic in the south and by stating a claim to Ukrainian Bukovina; according to Smena, Ilașcu did not see Transnistria as a Moldavian province, but hoped that the Front would maintain a hold of it, then use it for territorial exchanges.

On 27 August 1991, the Republic of Moldova declared its independence from the Soviet Union, which was immediately recognized by newly post-communist Romania. A Romanian critic of the decision, Valentin Băluțoiu, argues that recognition should never have been granted, since it implicitly validated Moldovan irredentism. Historian Vladimir Solonari, at the time a member of the pro-Soviet Interfront, argued that the declaration of independence featured "territorial demands toward Ukraine, far beyond [Moldova's] current borders"; another historian, Nicolae Enciu, reviews Solonari's claim as propaganda. As one of the pro-Romanian activists, poet Dumitru Matcovschi referred to Moldavia being incomplete, by invoking the image of its heraldic aurochs (also used as the republican arms):

Am vrut să desenez un cap de zimbru,
un cap de zimbru numai, dar am pus,
abia am pus creionul pe hârtie
și mâna dreaptă nu mi s-a supus

Trecui atunci creionu-n mâna stângă
și desenai cu stânga, ucenic,
dar desenai un cap
de zimbru straniu:
c-un singur corn și-acela mult prea mic

Translation:

I wished to draw myself an aurochs
its head and only that, but I just failed,
both my right hand and pen were setting down on paper,
but it just felt as if my arm was nailed.

And so I it took this up with my left arm, and pencil,
and taught myself to draw, just like a hack,
but what came up was this,
this strange head,
with just one horn, a very small one, on its rack.

As noted by diplomatic historian Ileana Racheru, Moldova's first President, Mircea Snegur (1990–1997), favored a "moderate pragmatic" approach to the issue of Moldovan identity in relation to both Romania and historical Moldavia. Snegur "never returned to the Soviet discourse on Moldovenism, preferring instead an autocephalous Romanian Moldovenism." This implied making "only limited mention to the history of medieval Moldavia and to the brief existence of a Moldavian Democratic Republic." Snegur also embraced the notion that Bessarabians had always striven for autonomy, including while incorporated within Greater Romania. Moldova–Romania relations were especially warm at that stage, as Snegur maintained personal contacts with Ion Iliescu, the President of Romania, who likewise favored a degree of continuity with the Soviet era. A Romanian opposition journalist, Nicolae Prelipceanu, cautioned in May 1992 that such fondness for Snegur could result in Moldovan–Romanian reunification as a post-Soviet "Greater Moldova", absorbing Romania itself into the Commonwealth of Independent States.

The two states drifted apart later in the 1990s—researcher Ovidiu Tănase proposes that they did so only after Romania's exclusion from peace negotiations during the Transnistria War. According to Tănase, the February 1994 elections in Moldova, carried by the Democratic Agrarianists, brought back "Moldovenism" and encouraged "talk of 'Greater Moldova'." In that context, Snegur also issued statements favoring Moldovan irredentism, and was sharply condemned for these by Ioan Solcanu, who was serving as vice president of Iliescu's Social Democratic Party. In July 1994, Moldovan journalist Nicolae Roșca, who had previously worked in Romania, declared that the Romanian state was on the verge of collapsing, and that "Bessarabia now has for a mission the recovery of its lost territories". He established a magazine to propagate the idea; called Patria Tînără, it was allegedly a front for an international businessman, Boris Birshtein. Late that year, a delegation of the Democratic Alliance of Hungarians in Romania visited Moldova and had talks with the Democratic Agrarianists. In that context, the Popular Front's Valentin Dolganiuc accused the two groups of conspiring toward the "federalization of Romania" and the establishment of a Greater Moldova.

In March 1996, Vasile Matei of the National Unity Party, who sat on the Romanian Parliament's oversight commission for the Intelligence Service, also raised alarm about the Agrarianists' agenda. He purported that a "Greater Moldova idea" was being used by Snegur's National Security Service to "dissolve the Romanian nation state". Reportedly, during that same period, Agrarianist Premier Andrei Sangheli ordered postal stationery with "the map of Greater Moldova [...] superimposed with the current arms of the Moldovan Republic." Tănase argues that the Moldovenist ascendancy ended later in 1996, when Petru Lucinschi, as President-elect, toned down the rhetoric. In 1999, Lucinschi formally renounced the Moldovan claim to northern Bessarabia, recognizing that territory as an integral part of Ukraine.

A historian linked to Lucinschi and the Agrarianists, Petre P. Moldovan, went from arguing that Russia should have annexed both halves of the Moldavian Principality to proposing that Moldova and Romanian Moldavia had vastly different historical experiences and economic interests, which required them to be neatly separated from each other. Overall however, the school of thought represented by Lucinschi looked back on the 1918 union as the "lesser of two evils", when compared to Soviet rule. Historian Stella Ghervas notes that Greater Moldovan ideas survived, within "Moldovenism", throughout Lucinschi's term. They highlight "the existence of an independent Greater Moldavia beginning in 1359, though glossing over facts such as its 17th-century disappearance as a self-governing principality or its borders never coinciding with those of the current State." Ghervas identifies this approach with two works of historiography: Istoria Moldovei din cele mai vechi timpuri până astăzi (1997) and Vasile Stati's Istoria Moldovei în date (1998). Meanwhile, in Romania, Constantin Simirad had established a "Party of the Moldavians", which he explained as a protest movement against Western Moldavia being neglected by the central government. His move caused outrage among mainstream politicians; in Parliament, Dumitru Mugurel Vintilă alleged that Simirad's movement was a front for the KGB and a vehicle for Greater Moldavian secession.

=== Under Voronin, Lupu, and Dodon ===
Aurelian Lavric's 2011 proposal for a territorial exchange between Moldova and Ukraine, with percentages of Romanians/Moldovans (seen by Lavric as one and the same ethnicity) by respective territorial unit

The Moldovan Party of Communists (PCRM) had also embraced the cause of Moldovan ethnic distinctiveness—in early 1999, it absorbed Stati's "Pro Moldova Movement", which was explicitly supportive of Greater Moldavianism. PCRM leader and one-time President of Moldova, Vladimir Voronin, spoke of a 10-million-strong Moldovan community in Romania; during his tenure (2001–2009), an Association of Moldovan Communities in Romania and the Moldovan Patriots' Party were formed with the explicit goal of securing Western Moldavia's integration with Moldova. In tandem, Moldovan and eastern Romanian local authorities began regional economic cooperation within a new Euroregion, called "Siret–Prut–Nistru". On the Romanian side, this effort involved Nicolae Ivanciu of Iași County, who went public with his opposition to the Greater Moldavian project—after having allegedly been proposed a political union by his colleagues in Căușeni District. In 2002, Iurie Roșca and his Moldovan Christian Democrats, who stood in opposition to Voronin, alternatively proposed fusing the two sides of ancient Moldavia into a single entity, which would then be included into a federal Romania. Their project caused indignation in Romanian circles, for seemingly questioning the centralizing basis of Romania; it did however win some support from members of the Christian Democratic National Peasants' Party.

As outgoing Romanian President, Iliescu spoke out in January 2004 against the notion of "Greater Moldavia" as a "falsification of historical realities", arguing that Western Moldavia was an inalienable part of the Romanians' "sacred patrimony". Historian Dorin Cimpoeșu comments that the PCRM absorbed Greater Moldovanists into its ranks, within a general trend which upheld "today's Republic of Moldova as the successor to historical Moldavia." "Under their pressures", he notes, Romanian history was removed from academic specialization in Moldova during 1999. One of the history schoolbooks, authored by Sergiu Nazaria and others, and approved by government in 2006, described Bessarabia's division between the Moldavian SSR and the Ukrainian SSR as an act of injustice. Proposals for Moldovan territorial growth were also made under the presidency of Marian Lupu (2010–2012), when political scientist Aurelian Lavric advanced territorial exchanges with Ukraine as a "sustainable solution" to the Transnistria conflict. He argued that Ukraine should take over breakaway Transnistria, and that Moldova should receive Ukrainian Bukovinian and north-Bessarabian raions largely peopled by Romanians and self-declared Moldovans—specifically Hertsa, Hlyboka, Novoselytsia and Storozhynets.

Băluțoiu notes the Greater Moldovan rhetoric was also perpetuated by the Party of Socialists. Socialist leader Igor Dodon (who was Moldova's president in 2016–2020) has declared that Moldova's "entire territory was swallowed up by other states", and that "Moldovans have suffered at the hands of Wallachians". In January 2018, Dodon celebrated Eminescu as a member of the "Moldovan people" and the "genius of our literature". As early as 2014, he also made statements questioning Moldova's borders with Ukraine, specifically "the historical south and the historical north of Moldova" (though not also Bukovina). Such stances overlapped with tensions between Romania and Russia, and were reportedly encouraged by Russian President Vladimir Putin. In early 2017, Dodon visited the Moscow Kremlin, and, at the press conference, stated his regret that "in 1812, the Russian Empire had not annexed Moldavia's entire territory"; Putin also allegedly presented Dodon with a "map of greater Moldova, along the pre-1812 borders." Political analyst Corina Rebegea reviews Putin's gesture as a "gimmick" and "failed disinformation experiment", arguing that it was aimed at unnerving Romanian nationalists. Dodon's stance sparked controversy in Romania, with a former Foreign Minister, Titus Corlățean, retorting that Romanians should instead present Moldovans with the option of "reunifying Greater Moldavia, but within our own country's borders."

As argued in 2009 by historian Ruslan Tanasă, the Greater Moldovan approach remains the "least developed" among the three competing ideologies at the heart of Moldovan identity disputes—in opposition to both Romanian nationalism and those who simply see the Moldavian SSR as Moldova's only historical predecessor. Tanasă views Moldovan irrendentism as spontaneous and reactive; he also notes its "weak points which put it at a significant disadvantage", including the fact that all three former Moldavian princely capitals are currently located within Romania's borders. In a 2016 piece, former Romanian Senator Paul Ghițiu contrarily argued that the territorial breakup of Romania was entirely possible "within a few years", largely because the country was being ruled upon by treasonous elites (in opposing these and this outcome, Ghițiu advocated a "Trumpist turn" in Romania). According to the same author, part of the eventual destruction of the country would involve "the Republic of Moldova [merging] with Moldova and Bukovina to form Greater Moldova."

Examples of 21st-century institutions and organizations that fully embrace irredentism include the weekly newspaper Moldova Mare, founded in 2008; and the Greater Moldova Party, formerly known as the "For the Nation and Country Party" and renamed in 2020 to its current name under its then president Teodor Turta. Victoria Furtună became the party's president in 2025; she demanded that same year the return of the Budjak from Ukraine, claiming that Moldova could demand a revision of the border since "there is no international treaty ratified by Moldova that recognizes the loss of the Budjak". The Moldova Mare group included Mihail Garbuz, who went on to establish his own party, the Patriots of Moldova, which also drew into its ranks Stati and Anatol Plugaru. This group supports Moldovan statehood within a Greater Russia, which explicitly denies Ukraine's current borders in the Budjak; during the Russo-Ukrainian war, Garbuz came under investigation by Ukrainian authorities after allegedly helping to set up a separatist National Council of Bessarabia.

== See also ==
- Controversy over ethnic and linguistic identity in Moldova
- Moldovanism
- Greater Romania
  - Unification of Moldova and Romania
- Russian irredentism
- Ukrainian irredentism
