= 2016 Moldovan presidential election =

- 30 October 2016 (first round); 13 November 2016 (second round)
- Turnout: 49.18% (first round); 53.45% (second round)
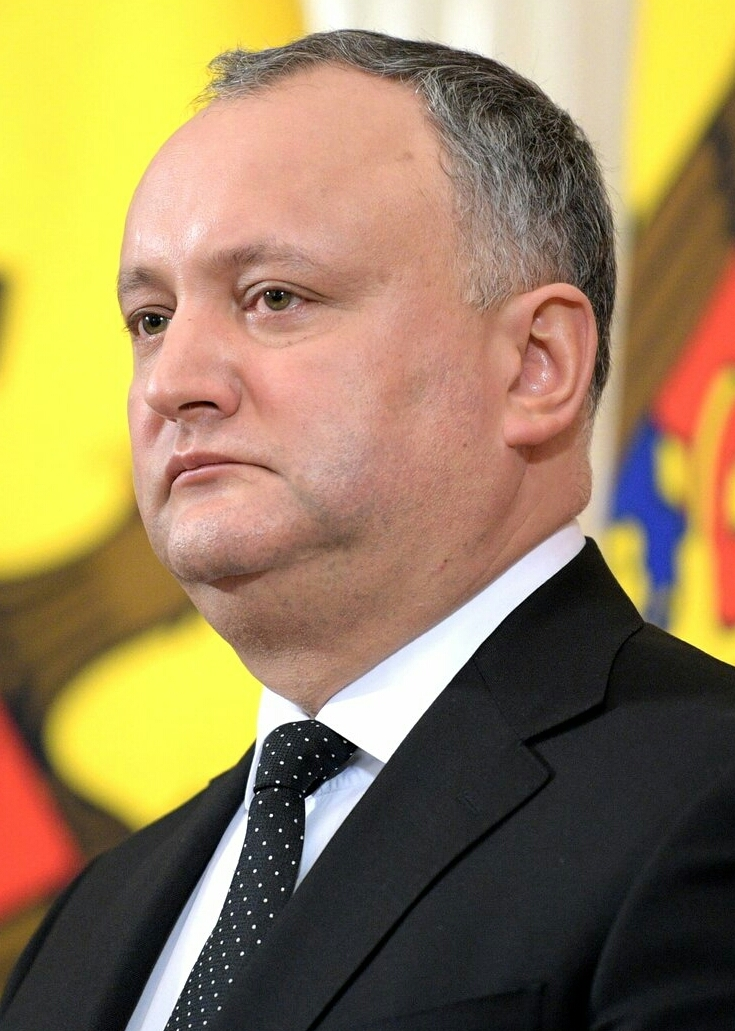

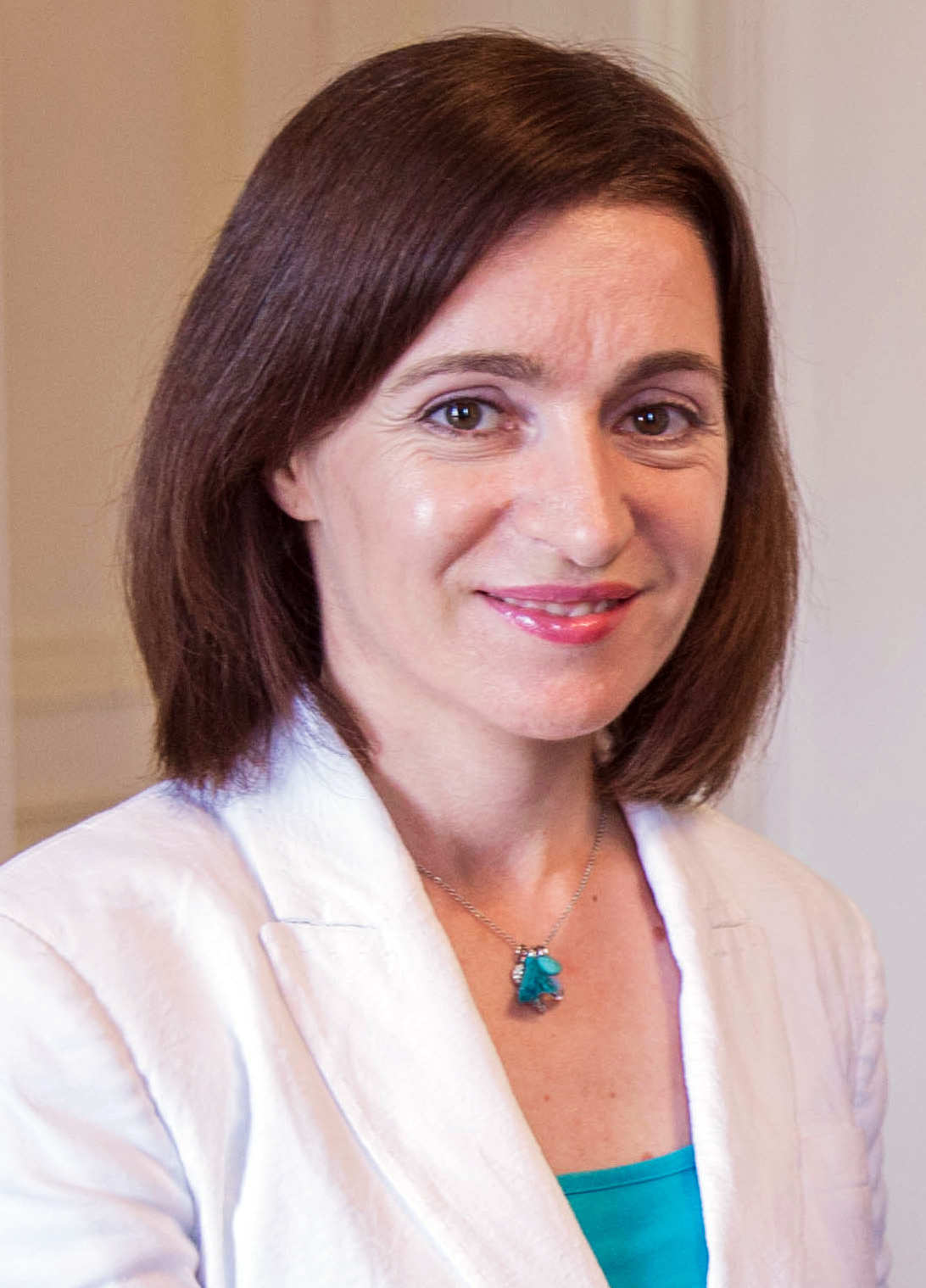
Candidate	Igor Dodon	Maia Sandu
Party	PSRM	PAS
Popular vote	834,081	766,593
Percentage	52.11%	47.89%
- Second round results by territorial electoral commission Dodon: 50–55% 55–60% 60–65% 65–70% 70–75% 75–80% 80–85% >95% Sandu: 50–55% 55–60% 60–65% 65–70% 75–80%
President before election
Nicolae Timofti
Independent
Elected President
Igor Dodon
PSRM

Presidential elections were held in Moldova on 30 October 2016. They were the first direct presidential elections since 1996 and followed a declaration by the Constitutional Court on 4 March 2016 that the 2000 constitutional revision that led to the president being indirectly elected by Parliament was unconstitutional. The elections were won by Igor Dodon of the Party of Socialists of the Republic of Moldova (PSRM).

== Candidates ==
# on electoral list	Candidate	Party
1	—	—
2	Mihai Ghimpu	Liberal Party
3	Iurie Leancă	European People's Party
4	Dumitru Ciubașenco	Our Party
5	Maia Sandu	Party of Action and Solidarity
6	Igor Dodon	Party of Socialists of the Republic of Moldova
7	Silvia Radu	Independent
8	Maia Laguta	Independent
9	Ana Guțu	Party "The Right"
10	Valeriu Ghilețchi	Independent

Withdrawn candidates:

- Marian Lupu – withdrew on 26 October and endorsed Maia Sandu.
- Andrei Năstase – withdrew on 15 October and supported a common candidate from the centre-right opposition, Maia Sandu.
- Inna Popenco – registration was annulled on 22 October by a court decision upon the CEC request.

Candidates who got registration refusal by CEC:

- Vitalia Pavlicenco
- Vasile Tarlev
- Roman Mihăeș
- Ion Dron

Candidates who failed to collect the required number of signatures:

- Oleg Brega – announced his withdrawal on 12 September, claiming the CEC were dishonest;
- Anatol Plugaru – announced his withdrawal from the race on 23 September, declaring the election "unconstitutional";
- Vadim Brinzan;
- Mihai Corj;
- Artur Croitor;
- Ilie Rotaru;
- Mihail Garbuz;
- Geta Saviţcaia.

The Party of Communists of the Republic of Moldova did not nominate a candidate and called on voters to boycott the elections as they considered them to be illegal. The Liberal Democratic Party of Moldova also failed to nominate a candidate, instead supporting a common candidate from the centre-right opposition, Maia Sandu.

== Opinion polls ==
=== First round ===
Date	Pollster	Sample	Dodon PSRM	Sandu PAS	Ciubașenco PN	Năstase PPDA	Voronin PCRM	Leancă PPEM	Lupu PDM	Others	Undecided	Lead
6–16 October	BOP	1,109	27.0%	9.3%	5.6%	8.1%		1.7%	7.5%	5.8%	35.0%	17.7%
23 September–6 October	Konrad Adenauer Stiftung Moldova	1,102	33.4%	26.5%				<5.0%	12.2%	<5.0%	11.4%	6.8%
23 September–6 October	Konrad Adenauer Stiftung Moldova	1,102	33.7%			21.9%		<5.0%	13.0%	<5.0%	11.4%	11.9%
23 September–6 October	Konrad Adenauer Stiftung Moldova	1,102	33.0%	14.3%		13.0%		<5.0%	12.5%	<5.0%	11.4%	18.6%
14–25 September	IDIS	1,108	23.1%	7.9%		7.7%		3.2%	7.6%	11.2%	27.5%	15.2%
28 September–5 October	ASDM	1,161	33.9%	10.1%		12.6%		6.8%	11.8%	9.1%	15.7%	21.3%
1–23 September	IRI	1,516	30%	13.5%		13%	5%	3%	12%	10%	14%	16.5%
2–10 September	ASDM	1,179	29.0%	12.9%		11.1%		6.5%	9.9%	6.8%	12.1%	16.1%
21 May–15 June	FOP	4,626	18.1%	11.4%	9.0%*	7.7%	5.1%	3.9%	3.7%	8.6%	10.2%	6.7%
May	NDI		20%	14%		13%	7%	5%	5%		24%	6%
16–23 April	IPP	1,143	18.5%	12.9%	4.8%*	7.7%	4.8%	2.6%	2.2%	9.4%	37.1%	5.6%
1–10 April	ASDM	1,169	18.1%	12.4%	10.9%*	10.3%	6.9%	5.7%	3.6%	19.2%	9.5%	5.7%
11–25 March	IRI	1,500	18%	10%	20%*	12%	6%	3%	5%	14%	18%	2%
11–20 March	Ziarul Timpul și Fondul Opiniei Publice	1,792	11.7%	9.0%	9.7%*	7.6%	4.9%	3.6%	3.4%	10.3%	14.2%	2.0%

* Other candidate Renato Usatîi may not participate. Each candidate must be at least 42 years of age.

=== Second round ===
==== Dodon–Sandu ====
Date	Poll Source	Sample Size			Undecided	Lead
Date	Poll Source	Sample Size	Dodon PSRM	Sandu PAS	Undecided	Lead
6–16 October	BOP	1,109	40,8%	24.1%	35.1%	16.7%

== Conduct ==
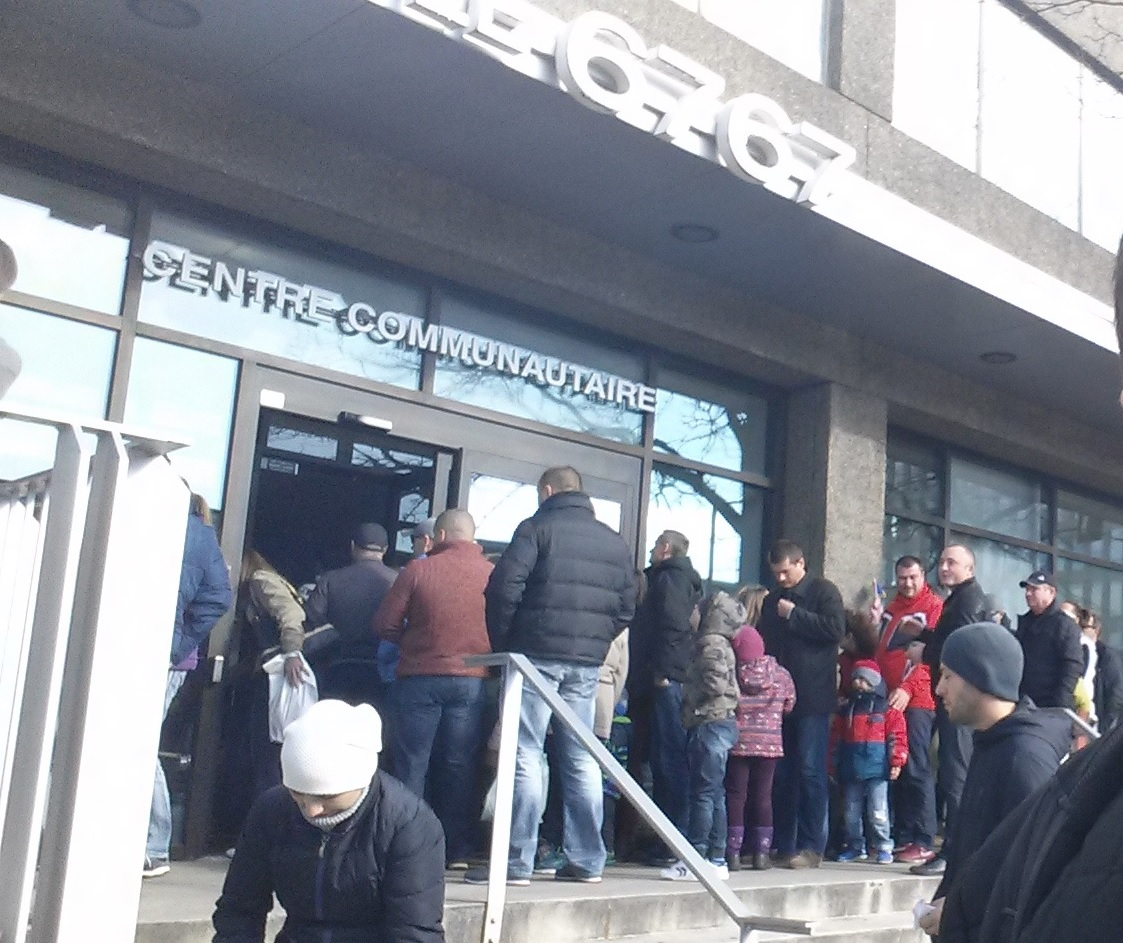
A voting line in the second round

=== Signature collection ===
Marian Lupu, the candidate of the Democratic Party of Moldova, collected over 20,000 signatures in his support and submitted them to the Central Electoral Commission in less than a day. The swiftness of the procedure was deemed suspicious, because the required stamps and signatures had to be obtained from public institutions that were closed at the time the party supporters could have collected them.

An independent candidate, Oleg Brega, filed a complaint with the Commission, indicating that the DPM must have received preferential treatment as their paperwork was handled on Friday after working hours, as well as on Saturday, a non-working day. The CEC dismissed the complaint and in the aftermath Brega decided to drop out of the presidential race, considering it unfair. A separate complaint was filed by Andrei Năstase on the same grounds.

Lupu stated that it was due to the effectiveness of his staff, rather than cheating.

=== Voter roll ===
Prior to the elections the Central Electoral Commission announced that the total number of voters was 3.2 million, an implausible figure, given the steady decline in Moldova's population, and the fact that preliminary results of the 2014 demographic survey indicated that the total population of the country was only three million.

An independent investigation revealed that the lists of voters prepared by the Central Electoral Commission were inaccurate and contained a significant number of deceased people. From a sample of 300 deceased, 100 were still listed as eligible to cast their vote, according to the online voter registry managed by the CEC.

The voter list included some prominent figures, such as the movie director Emil Loteanu (died in 2003), the actor Mihai Volontir (died in 2015) and the journalist Constantin Tănase (died in 2014).

The Commission acknowledged that the lists were not fully accurate, but pointed out that only three out of the alleged 100 were present on the list. They stated that at the time of the journalists' investigation, the online database reflected data from previously held elections, rather than the most up-to-date figures.

=== Overseas voting issues ===
Numerous overseas voters in Europe were unable to vote due insufficient ballot papers being available. However, the number of voters unable to vote was thought to be lower than Dodon's margin of victory.

== Results ==
As none of the candidates was able to achieve a majority on 30 October 2016, a second round of voting took place on 13 November 2016 between the two leading candidates, Igor Dodon of PSRM and Maia Sandu of PAS. Dodon won the second round with 52.11% of the vote and became the fifth President of Moldova on 23 December.

Candidate	Party	First round		Second round	
Candidate	Party	Votes	%	Votes	%
Igor Dodon	Party of Socialists	680,550	47.98	834,081	52.11
Maia Sandu	Party of Action and Solidarity	549,152	38.71	766,593	47.89
Dumitru Ciubașenco	Our Party	85,466	6.03		
Iurie Leancă	European People's Party	44,065	3.11		
Mihai Ghimpu	Liberal Party	25,490	1.80		
Valeriu Ghilețchi	Independent	15,354	1.08		
Maia Laguta	Independent	10,712	0.76		
Silvia Radu	Independent	5,276	0.37		
Ana Guțu	The Right	2,453	0.17		
Total		1,418,518	100.00	1,600,674	100.00
Valid votes		1,418,518	98.46	1,600,674	99.17
Invalid/blank votes		22,215	1.54	13,349	0.83
Total votes		1,440,733	100.00	1,614,023	100.00
Registered voters/turnout		2,929,694	49.18	3,019,495	53.45
Source: CEC, CEC
