= Valeriu Pasat =

Moldovan politician (born 1958)

Valeriu Pasat OR
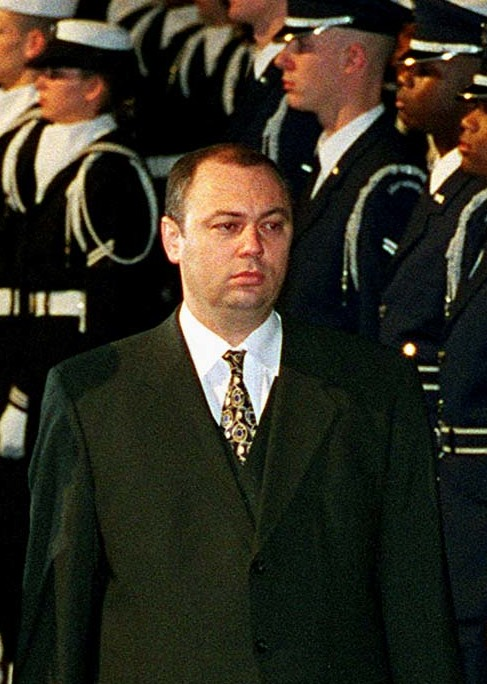
- Pasat in 1998

1st Director of the Information and Security Service
- In office 5 January 2000 – 21 December 2001
- Succeeded by: Ion Ursu

Minister of National Security
- In office 11 May 1999 – 21 December 1999
- President: Petru Lucinschi
- Prime Minister: Ion Sturza
- Preceded by: Tudor Botnaru

Minister of Defense
- In office 24 January 1997 – 11 May 1999
- President: Petru Lucinschi
- Prime Minister: Ion Ciubuc; Ion Sturza
- Preceded by: Pavel Creangă
- Succeeded by: Boris Gămurari

Moldovan Ambassador to Russia, Finland and Kazakhstan
- In office 26 August 1994 – 24 January 1997
- President: Mircea Snegur; Petru Lucinschi
- Prime Minister: Andrei Sangheli
- Preceded by: Anatol Țăranu
- Succeeded by: Valeriu Bobuțac

Personal details
- Born: 13 July 1958 (age 68) Scumpia, Moldavian SSR, Soviet Union

Valeriu Pasat (born 13 July 1958) is a Moldovan historian and politician. He held the office of Minister of Defense of Moldova in the Ciubuc and Sturza cabinets.

== Biography ==
Valeriu Pasat was born on July 13, 1958, in the village of Scumpia, Falesti District, Moldavian SSR, Soviet Union. In 1982, he graduated from the History Department of Chisinau State University with a degree in history teaching. He served in the USSR Army for two years. In 1984, he entered graduate school at the Institute of History of the USSR of the Soviet Academy of Sciences, but studied for only two years. From 1988 to 1992, Pasat worked at the Institute of Political Studies of the Central Committee of the Communist Party of Moldova (CPM) as a senior research fellow. In 1989–1990, he worked at the Chisinau City Committee of the CPM as the head of the ideological department.

Since 1992, he worked at the Moldovan Embassy in Russia. During his work, Pasat studied at the Institute of Russian History of the Russian Academy of Sciences, as well as at the Diplomatic Academy of the Russian Ministry of Foreign Affairs. In August 1994, after a period of complications in international relations between Russia and Moldova, Pasat became Ambassador of Moldova to Russia. After the second round of the 1996 Moldovan presidential election, Pasat returned to his Moldova, and after the resignation of Ion Ciubuc from the post of Minister of Defense, he took his place. On May 12, 1999, Valeriu Pasat was removed from this post and appointed Minister of National Security of the Republic of Moldova. On December 21, 2001, he was dismissed.

== Post government ==
Since 2000, Pasat has been a Corresponding Member of the Academy of Sciences of Moldova, and since 2002, he has worked at the Institute of History of the Academy of Sciences of Moldova. Since 2004, he has been an advisor on foreign economic relations for RAO UES of Russia. In March 2005, the former minister was arrested in Chisinau and charged with embezzlement of public funds. On January 17, 2006, the court sentenced him to 10 years in prison for embezzlement. In February of that year, he was charged with organizing a coup d'état, and in October, the Chisinau Court of Appeals (CCA) reduced his prison term from 10 to 5 years. On July 9, 2007, Pasat was amnestied and released.

On July 10, Pasat arrived in Russia, and soon returned to his previous position at RAO UES of Russia. On July 16, 2009, the Chisinau Court of Appeal acquitted Pasat. Since 2010, Pasat has been living in Moldova.

== Awards ==
- Order of the Republic (February 2, 2019)
- Order of Friendship (June 14, 1997, Russia)
