= Dumitru Ciubașenco =

Moldovan journalist

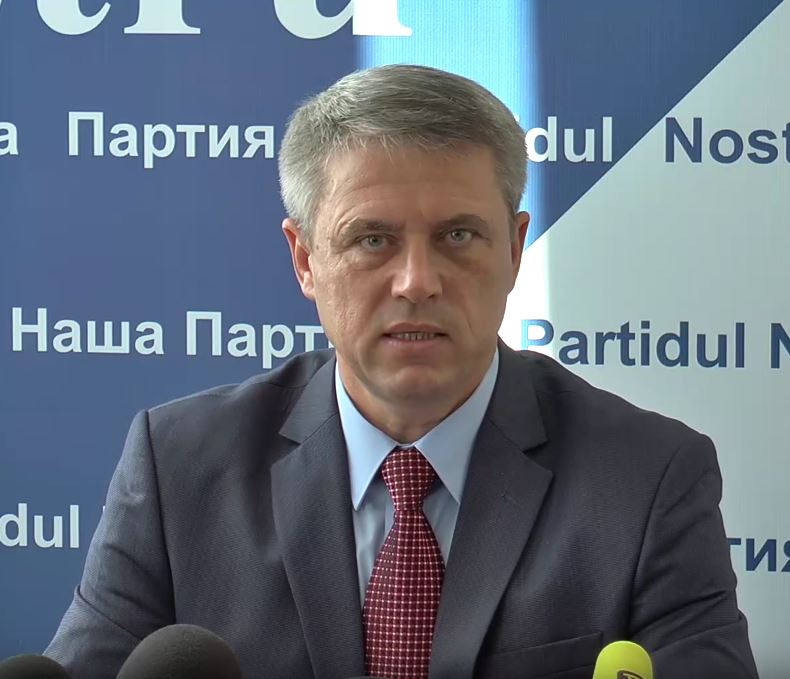
- Ciubașenco in 2016
- Born: 14 August 1964 (age 62); Chişinău, Moldavian SSR, Soviet Union
- Education: MSU Faculty of Journalism
- Occupation: Journalist
- Awards: Order of the Republic (Moldova)

Dumitru Ciubașenco (born 14 August 1964) is a journalist from the Republic of Moldova.

== Biography ==
He was the head of Moldavschie Vedomosti and worked for Radio Free Europe. He was a candidate of the Liberal Democratic Party of Moldova for July 2009 Moldovan parliamentary election and now is the spokesman of Valeriu Pasat, the Chairman of the Humanist Party (Moldova) and the former Moldovan Minister of Defense and ex-director of the Moldovan intelligence.

== Awards ==
- Order of the Republic (Moldova) – highest state distinctions (2009)
