= Alexandru Esaulenco =

Moldovan jurist and diplomat

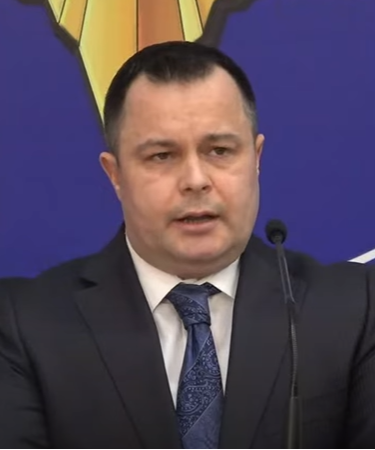
- Esaulenco in 2022

Moldovan Ambassador to Azerbaijan and Georgia
- Incumbent
- Assumed office 4 October 2022
- President: Maia Sandu
- Prime Minister: Natalia Gavrilița; Dorin Recean; Alexandru Munteanu; Eugen Osmochescu (acting); Vasile Tofan
- Preceded by: Gheorghe Leucă

Director of the Security and Intelligence Service
- In office 25 June 2019 – 2 June 2022
- Preceded by: Vasile Botnari
- Succeeded by: Alexandru Musteață

Personal details
- Born: 23 September 1977 (age 48) Chișinău, Moldavian SSR, Soviet Union
- Education: Free International University of Moldova

Alexandru Esaulenco (born 23 September 1977) is a Moldovan jurist. He currently serves as the Moldovan Ambassador to Azerbaijan.
