= Iuliana Gorea-Costin =

Moldovan diplomat and politician

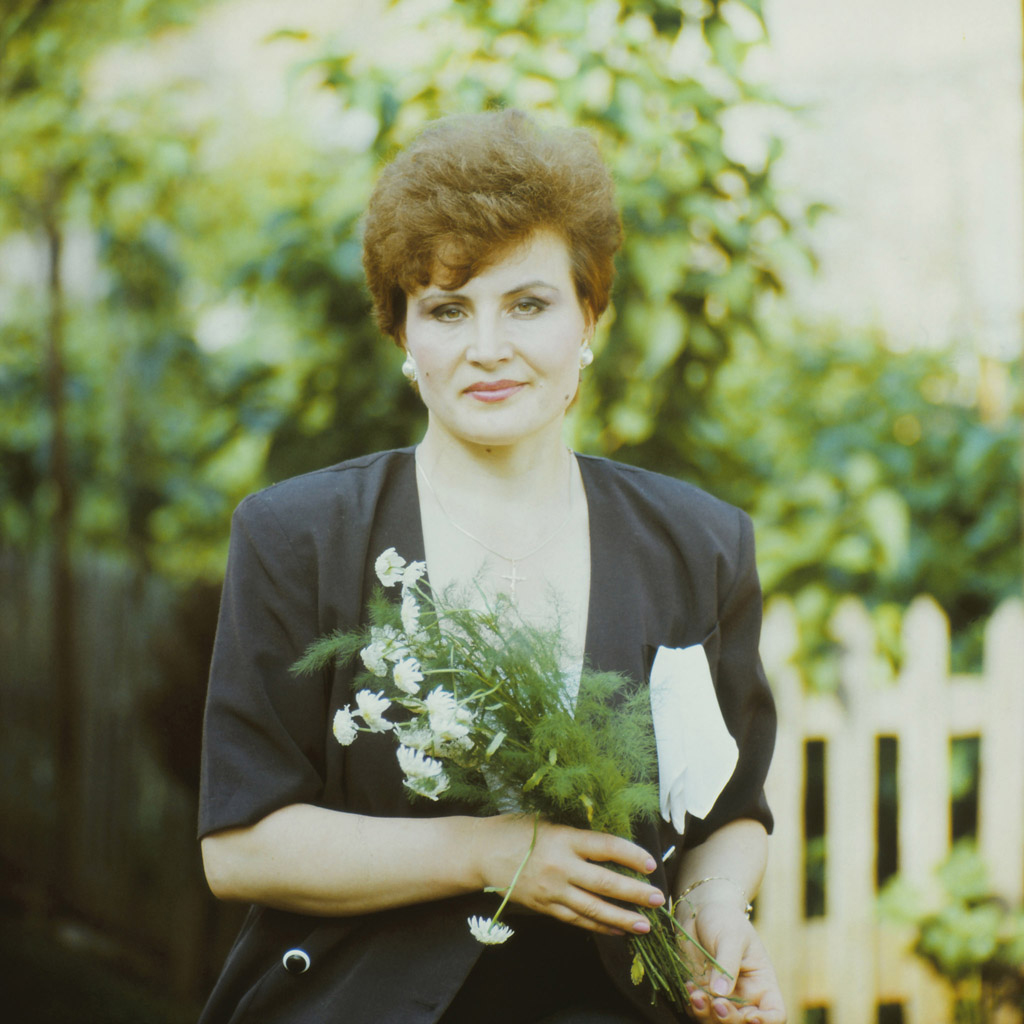
- Gorea-Costin in 1993
- Born: November 28, 1957 (age 68); Cornești, Moldavian SSR, Soviet Union
- Education: Moldova State University
- Spouse: Nicolae Costin
- Children: 1

Iuliana Gorea-Costin (born November 28, 1957) is a diplomat and politician from the Republic of Moldova. She is a philologist and lawyer by education and served as the first Permanent Representative of Moldova to the Council of Europe and the first director of the "Mircea Eliade" Romanian-English High School in Chişinău. She ran as an independent candidate in Moldovan presidential election, 1996. and Chișinău election, 2005.

Between 1990 and 1996, she published in Literatura şi Arta, Mesagerul, Femeia Moldovei, Glasul Naţiunii, Ţara, Astra, Luminătorul, Pro Vatra, Generația etc.

Iuliana Gorea-Costin was married to Nicolae Costin (a former mayor of Chişinău)
