= Vasile Botnari =

Moldovan economist and politician

Director of the Security and Intelligence Service
- In office 3 May 2018 – 8 June 2019
- Preceded by: Vitalie Pîrlog
- Succeeded by: Alexandru Esaulenco

Minister of Information Technology and Communications
- In office 20 January 2016 – 15 February 2017
- President: Nicolae Timofti; Igor Dodon
- Prime Minister: Pavel Filip
- Preceded by: Pavel Filip

Minister of Transport and Roads Infrastructure
- In office 31 May 2013 – 30 July 2015
- President: Nicolae Timofti
- Prime Minister: Iurie Leancă; Chiril Gaburici; Natalia Gherman (acting)
- Preceded by: Anatol Șalaru
- Succeeded by: Iurie Chirinciuc

Member of the Moldovan Parliament
- In office 30 December 2010 – 31 May 2013
- Succeeded by: Mihail Solcan
- Parliamentary group: Democratic Party

Personal details
- Born: 22 July 1975 (age 50) Strășeni, Moldavian SSR, Soviet Union
- Party: Partidul Democrat din Moldova
- Other political affiliations: Political Alliance for a European Moldova (2015); Pro-European Coalition (2013–2014); Alliance for European Integration (2009–2013)
- Spouse: Natalia Botnari
- Children: 2
- Occupation: Economist

Vasile Botnari (born 22 July 1975) is a Moldovan economist and politician. From May 2018 until June 2019 he was the Director of the Information and Security Agency of the Republic of Moldova. He was the Minister of Informational Technologies and Communications of Moldova from 20 January 2016 to 15 February 2017. Previously, since 31 May 2013 was the Minister of Transport and Road Infrastructure of the Republic of Moldova on by 30 July 2015, afterwards being replaced by Anatol Șalaru and then succeeded by Iurie Chirinciuc.

He is married and has two children. Besides Romanian, he also knows Russian and English.

== Legal issues ==
In 2020, Botnari faced legal challenges related to the unlawful expulsion of Turkish teachers from Moldova. He was found guilty of abuse of power, fined 88,000 lei, and prohibited from holding public office for five years.
