= Greater Ukraine =

Claims by Ukrainian nationalists to territory outside Ukraine

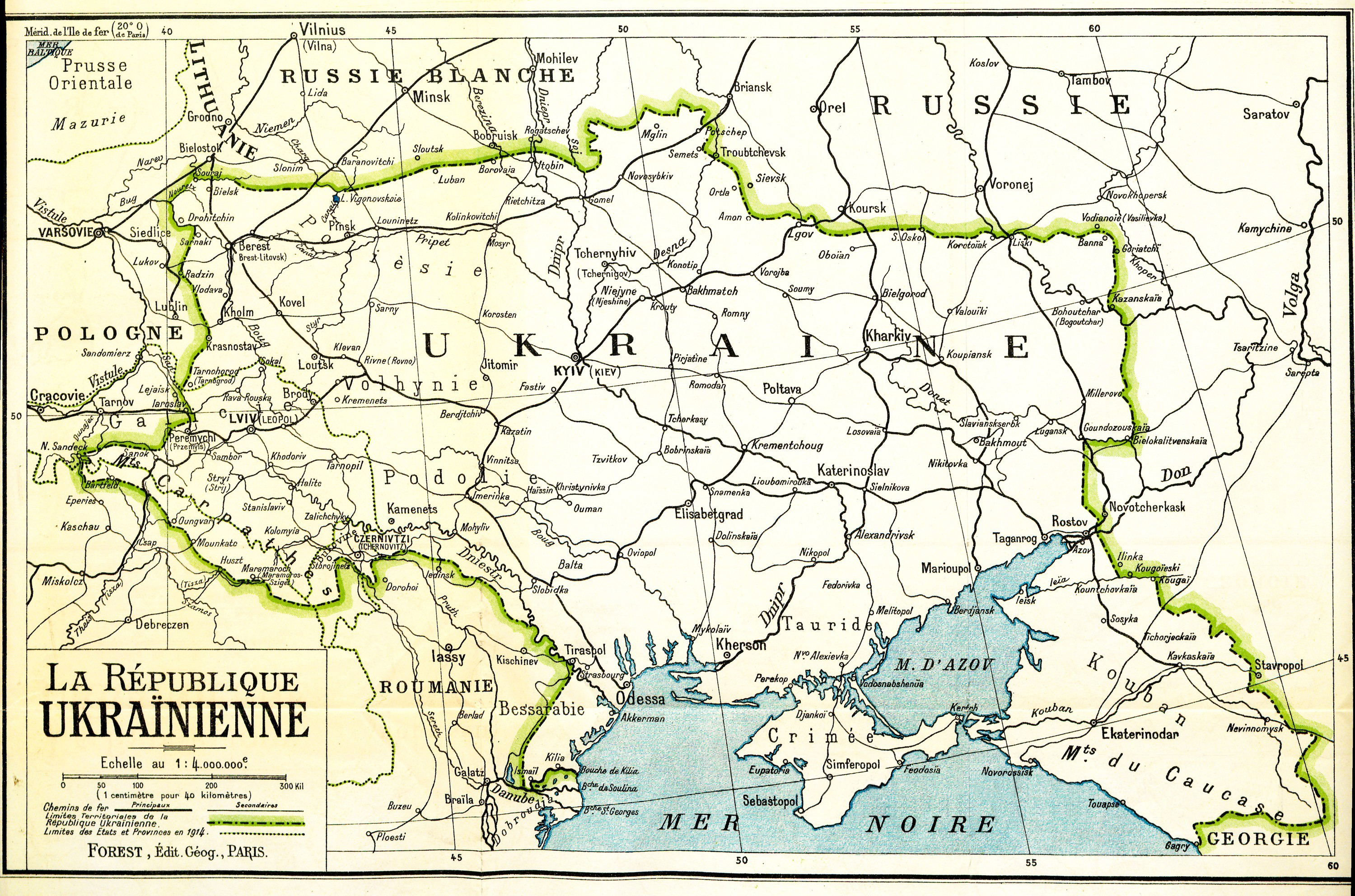
Map of Ukraine presented by the Ukrainian delegation to the Paris Peace Conference, 1919, before establishing the Ukrainian SSR.

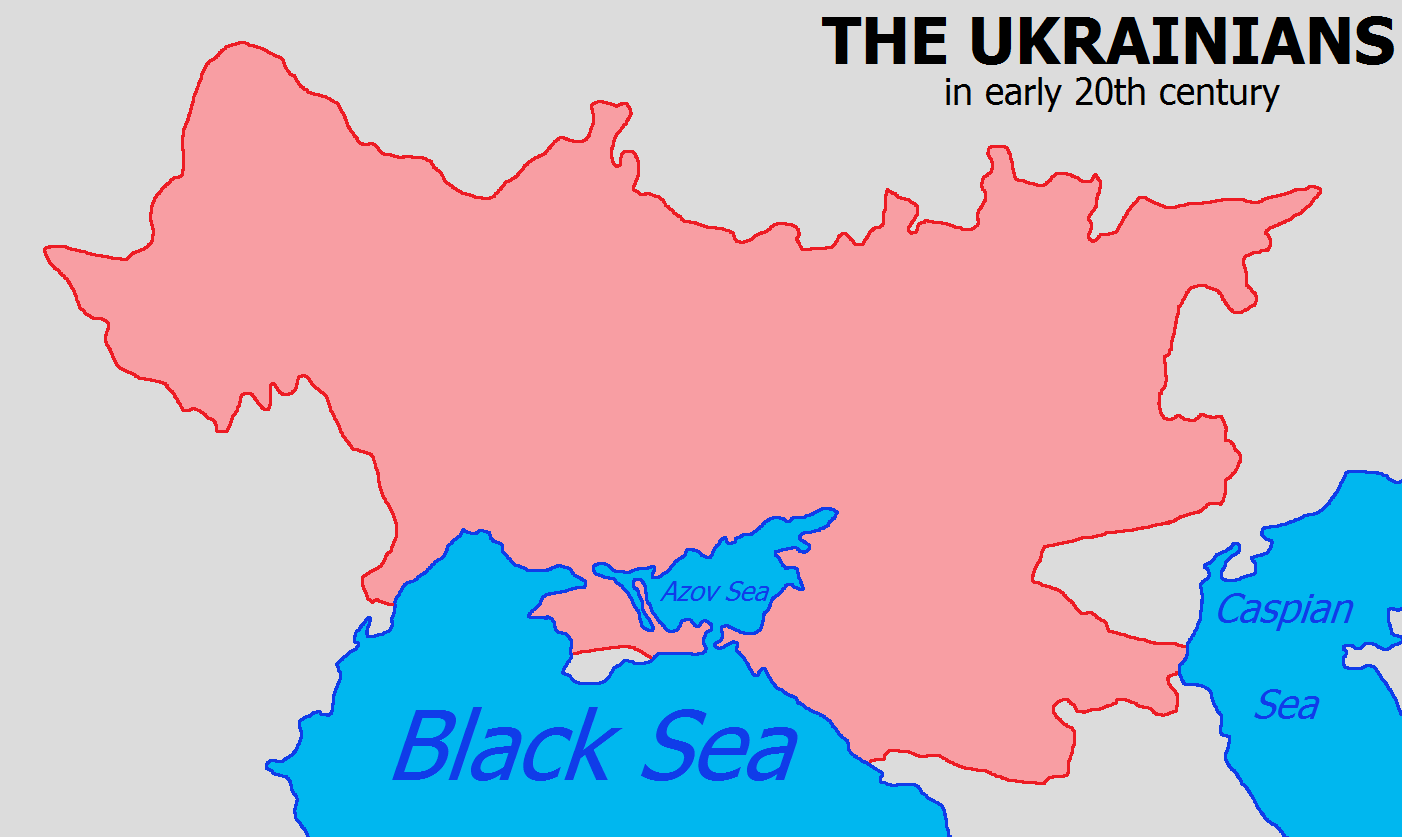
Map of Ukrainian settlement in Eastern Europe based on a postcard issued in 1919.

Ukrainian irredentism or Greater Ukraine refers to claims made by some Ukrainian nationalist groups to territory outside of Ukraine which they consider part of the Ukrainian national homeland.

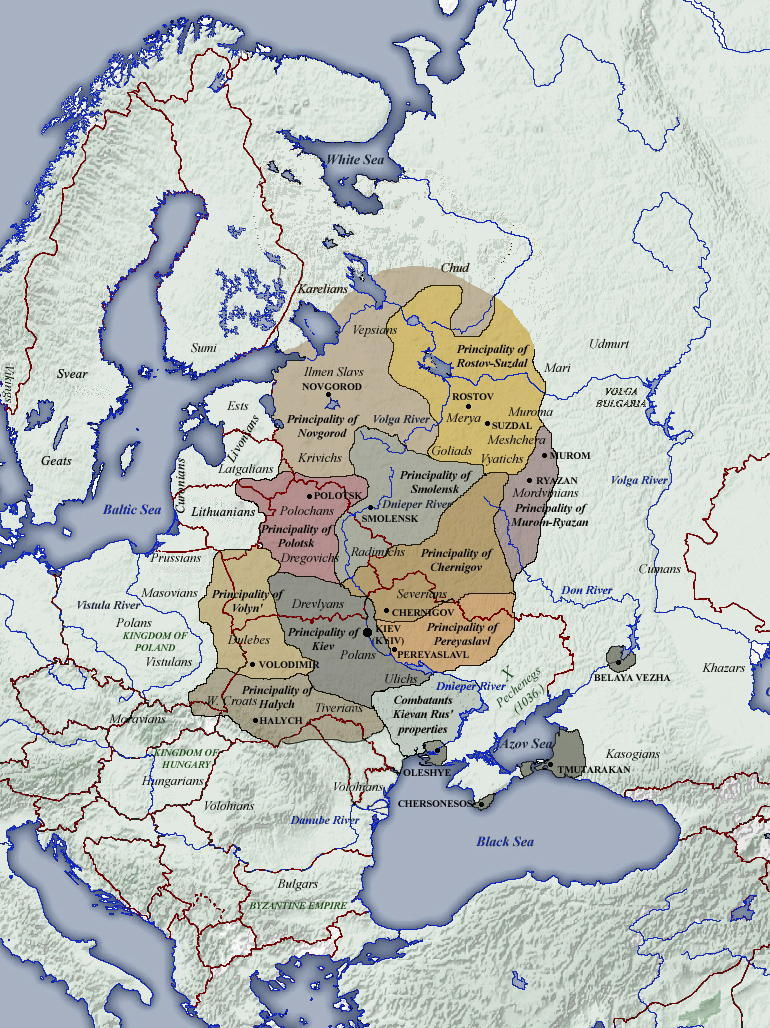
Principalities of Kievan Rus', (1054–1132)

== History ==
=== Rise of nationalism ===
The 10 commandments of the Ukrainian People's Party (1902–1907) were developed by Ukrainian nationalist, the leader of UPP Mykola Mikhnovsky in 1904. These commandments were a kind of honor code for the party. They called for a one, united, indivisible, from the Carpathians to the Caucasus, independent, free, democratic Ukraine – a republic of working people.

== Claimed regions ==
Since Mikhnovsky the idea of ‘Ukrainian Independent United State’ (Ukrainian: Українська Самостійна Соборна Держава Ukrainska Samostiyna Soborna Derzhava) has been a key nationalist slogan, but many would argue that the ‘unification’ (соборність sobornist’) of Ukrainian lands was partially completed in 1939–45.

Today's would-be Ukraina irredenta is mainly in the east, on the territory that is now part of the Russian Federation:

- Starodub region north of Chernihiv
- South-eastern parts of Voronezh, Kursk and Rostov oblasts
- Kuban region (Krasnodar Krai, parts of Stavropol Krai and Adygea)

In the west, some radical nationalists would also cover the following territories:

- Transnistria, the disputed left bank of the Dniester in Moldova
- Prešov region in north-eastern Slovakia
- Zakerzonia (Chełm and Przemyśl) in south-eastern Poland
- Brest region in south-western Belarus
- Southern Bukovina and the area around Maramureș in northern Romania

Ukraine seriously claiming territories of neighbouring states is not considered possible. Foreign claims against Ukrainian territory have been acted on in the Russian Federation's 2014 annexation of Crimea, its covert military support of separatism in the Donbas region, aggressive rhetoric by the Russian government, and ultimately the 2022 invasion. In the case of Russian–Ukrainian conflict, radical Ukrainian nationalists could try to take advantage in the north Caucasus or elsewhere, but the 2024-25 Kursk offensive was for them a preview of taking back these lands.

== See also ==
- Greater Russia
- Greater Romania
- Greater Bulgaria
- Greater Moldova
- Greater Hungary
