= Tudor Botnaru =

Tudor Botnaru OR

Minister of National Security
- In office May 11, 1999 – January 24, 1997
- President: Mircea Snegur
- Prime Minister: Valeriu Muravschi
- Succeeded by: Valeriu Pasat

Ambassador of Moldova to the Netherlands, Luxembourg, and the United Kingdom Head of the Moldovan Mission to the Council of Europe
- In office May 3, 1995 – March 17, 1997

Chairman of the KGB of the Moldavian SSR
- In office June 23, 1990 – August 29, 1991
- First Secretary: Grigore Eremei
- Preceded by: Georgiy Lavranchuk
- Succeeded by: Anatoly Plagara

Personal details
- Born: December 27, 1935 Lipceni, Kingdom of Romania
- Died: December 30, 2017 (aged 82) Chișinău, Moldova

Tudor Leonte Botnaru (December 27, 1935 – December 30, 2017) was a general from the Republic of Moldova, who served as Minister of National Security (1990–1991 and 1997–1999).

== Biography ==
Tudor Botnaru was born on December 27, 1935 in the village of Lipceni (today in the Rezina District). He graduated from the Faculty of Philology of the State University of Moldova in 1959. After graduating from the faculty, he worked as a guide and chief interpreter at the "Intourist" Hotel in Chișinău (1959-1962). He was a member of the Communist Party of the Soviet Union, joining in 1965. He graduated from the Higher KGB Courses in Minsk (School No. 302).

In 1963 he was employed by the Committee for State Security of the Moldavian Soviet Socialist Republic (KGB of the Moldavian SSR), working in the counterintelligence services, and from 1966 – in the foreign intelligence services. He became a colonel. Between 1978 and 1982, he was the advisor to the rector of the Chișinău State University. As a foreign intelligence officer, he had diplomatic coverage of the Soviet Union, working at the USSR embassies in Romania and France. Within the KGB of the Moldavian SSR, he served in turn as chief operational inspector and later bureau head.

Tudor Botnaru worked at the State Security Committee of Moldova, then he was in the Union Committee, then he was a security officer at the Soviet Embassy in Bucharest.

== Head of the KGB ==
In July 1990, at the initiative of the Republic's leadership, Botnaru was brought from Bucharest and appointed as Chairman of the State Security Committee (head of the KGB) of the Moldavian SSR, being promoted to the rank of Major General. He was the first foreign intelligence officer to become Chairman of the KGB of the Moldavian SSR.

In April 1990, the Botnaru's Ministry of National Security, under the pretext that there was a danger that the KGB premises of the MSSR would be attacked by the "extremists" of the Popular Front of Moldova, decided to transport the KGB Archive of the MSSR from Chișinău to Tiraspol, where it is still located today. He was also the author of the proposal to reorganize the KGB of the Moldavian SSR into an intelligence service, a proposal that was not taken up at that time.

Tudor Botnaru served as Chairman of the State Security Committee of the Moldavian SSR until August 29, 1991, after the August Coup that resulted in the dissolution of the USSR. Accused of collaborating with the coup plotters, Botnaru was dismissed from office immediately after the proclamation of the Republic of Moldova's independence. In a 2001 interview, he claimed that he knew nothing about the organization of the coup, although he had been in Moscow shortly before, at the meeting of the KGB Collegium, but no one said anything about the organization of a coup, the organizers planning their actions in complete secrecy, intending to involve only the Securitate officers who were directly subordinate to the KGB Central Office in Moscow.

== Independent Moldova ==
=== Diplomatic year ===
Between 1991 and 1994, General Botnaru served as Head of the Training Center of the Ministry of National Security. Since April 1994, he has served as First Deputy Minister of Foreign Affairs to Mihai Popov. Between December 1994 and 1997, he served as Ambassador of the Republic of Moldova to the Kingdom of Belgium and, cumulatively, to the United Kingdom, the Luxembourg and the Netherlands, as well as Head of the Diplomatic Mission of the Republic of Moldova to the Council of Europe (since 3 May 1995). He was recalled from office on 17 March 1997, after being appointed Minister of National Security.

=== Minister of National Security ===
From 24 January 1997 to 11 May 1999, Tudor Botnaru held the position of Minister of National Security, being a member of the Supreme Security Council. On 14 March 1997, President Petru Lucinschi granted him the military rank of division general of the Moldovan National Army. On 11 May 1999, he was dismissed from the position of Minister, "in connection with reaching retirement age" and placed in reserve.

== Retirement ==
He ran in the parliamentary elections of February 25, 2001 for the position of deputy on the lists of the Social-Political Movement "For Order and Justice". In 2004, he published, together with Colonel Alexandru Ganenco, the work Istoria Serviciilor Secrete. [Breviary], at the Museum Publishing House in Chișinău, this being the first attempt to present the history of the Soviet Moldovan secret services, through the biographies of their heads.

Tudor Botnaru was married and has a child. He died on December 30, 2017 in Chișinău.
