= Iurie Chirinciuc =

Moldovan businessman turned politician

Minister of Transport and Roads Infrastructure
- In office 30 July 2015 – 30 May 2017
- President: Nicolae Timofti; Igor Dodon
- Prime Minister: Valeriu Streleț; Gheorghe Brega (Acting); Pavel Filip
- Preceded by: Vasile Botnari

Member of the Moldovan Parliament
- In office 9 December 2014 – 30 July 2015
- Parliamentary group: Liberal Party

Personal details
- Born: 29 May 1961 (age 65) Costuleni, Moldavian SSR, Soviet Union
- Party: Liberal Party
- Spouse: Tamara Chirinciuc
- Children: 2
- Education: Moldova State University
- Occupation: Politician, businessman, economist
- Website: www.chirinciuc.md

Iurie Chirinciuc (born 29 May 1961) is a Moldovan businessman turned politician, who has served as Minister of Transport and Roads Infrastructure of Moldova since 30 July 2015 until 30 May 2017. Prior to this, between 31 December 2014 and August 2015 he was a member of Parliament of Moldova, in the parliamentary faction of Liberal Party.

From 2008 until November 2014 Chirinciuc was president of the Moldovan football club FC Costuleni.

In 1992 Chirinciuc began his business activity; he became vice-director of the firm Angrogoscom (1992), then executive director of the company Saturn SRL (1992–1997), and later vice-president of MOLDACOM SA (1997–1998), and director of ROVIGO SRL (1998–2013).

In 2004 he founded the Association of Furniture Manufacturers of Moldova, being its president until 2011, then he became president of the Union of Furniture Manufacturers of Moldova (2011–2013).

Between 2011 and 2014 he was a councillor in the Council of Ungheni District.

In late April 2017 the anti-corruption prosecutors and the CNA officers detained Chirinciuc, suspecting him in corruption acts. One month later, while signing the decrees for the liberal ministers resignations (who left the government coalition), president Igor Dodon has also signed a decree for dismissal of Iurie Chirinciuc from the office of Minister of Transport and Roads Infrastructure, while Chirinciuc was placed under home arrest.

Iurie Chirinciuc is married and has two children.
