= Boris Birshtein =

Lithuanian businessman

Boris Joseph Birshtein
- בוריס יוסף בירשטיין
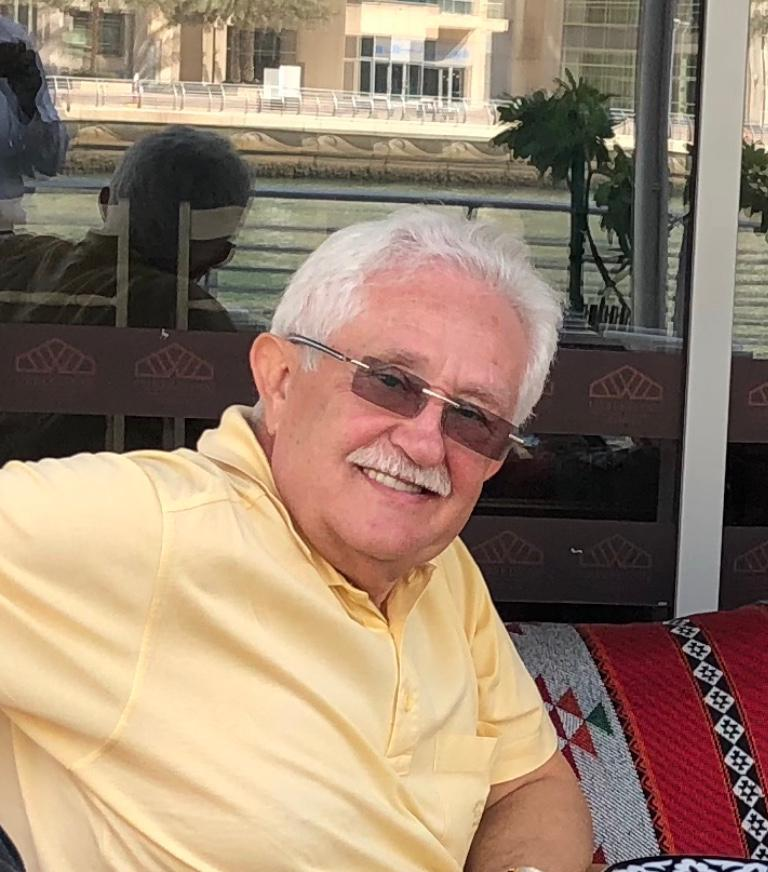
- Born: November 11, 1947 (age 78); Vilnius, Lithuanian SSR or Chișinău, Moldovan SSR, Soviet Union
- Occupation: Businessman
- Website: borisbirshtein.com

Boris Joseph Birshtein (Hebrew: בוריס יוסף בירשטיין; born 11 November 1947 in Vilnius or Chișinău) is a Soviet-born Israeli-Swiss-Canadian businessman and the former chairman of Seabeco, an investment and trading company.

== Career ==
Birshtein emigrated to Israel in 1979, and then to Switzerland and Canada, where he began building the Seabeco Group, an international network of companies that officially traded oil, gold, diamonds and chemicals. The well-connected Birshtein was an influential figure across the former Soviet Union. Birshtein survived a car crash that killed the then Prime Minister of Kyrgyzstan, Nasirdin Isanov.

In 1991, Kyrgyzstan's then president, Askar Akayev, appointed Birshtein president of the country's committee for reconstruction and development. Shortly afterward, the Kirgiz government empowered Birshtein to act as its trade representative abroad.

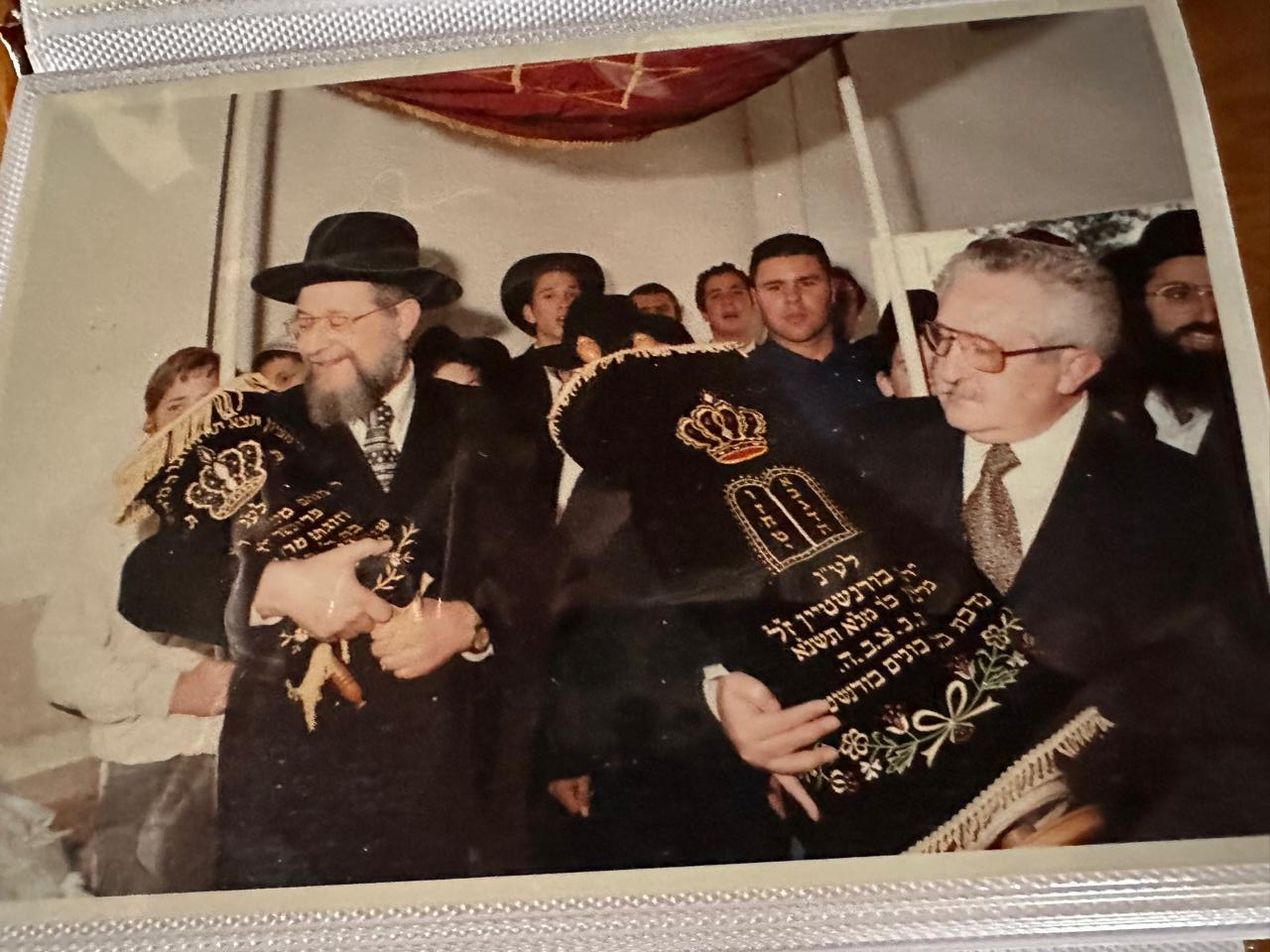
Boris Birshtein dedicating a new Torah in Chișinău

In 1992, Birshtein helped ensure Canada’s Cameco Corp. won the contract to develop Kyrgyzstan's Kumtor Gold Mine. He was also the owner of Moldova’s top hotel.

=== Seabeco Group ===
Birshtein is the former chairman of Seabeco Group. Seabeco invested in property in Russia in the late 1980s and early 1990s.

=== Businesses in Moldova ===
According to former Moldovan Prime Minister Mircea Druc, Birshtein was a mentor for former presidents Mircea Snegur, Petru Lucinschi and Vladimir Voronin. He has also been described as the mentor of Vladimir Plahotniuc.

Birshtein was an adviser for president Snegur. He had a large influence in the Moldovan political and business environment. He owned 65% of the shares of the largest bank in the country – „Eximbank”, as well as the four-star hotel „Seabeco”. Birstein also had a large media trust in Moldova, created in the second half of the 90s. There are rumours that Birshtein also helped Snegur to end the Transnistria War: he managed to bring Russian vice president Aleksandr Rutskoy and defence minister Viktor Barannikov to Moldova in the midst of the conflict. Rutskoy and Barannikov managed to negotiate a ceasefire, and a few days after this visit, Snegur and Boris Yeltsin signed the ceasefire agreement. Valeriu Saharneanu claims that Birshtein was an agent of Rutskoy, to convince Moldovan President Snegur to end the conflict on Russia's terms. A company controlled by Birshtein would also eventually produce all Moldovan passports and other forms of official identification. According to sources close to Snegur, Israeli businessman Miron Shor, the father of future Moldovan politician Ilan Shor, who was a friend of Birshtein, moved to Moldova in 1991, at the invitation of Snegur.

Former Prime Minister Ion Sturza claims that Birshtein's influence in the Moldovan political and business environment was so large in the 90s and early 2000s that he met with the heads of state at the airport and that he personally appointed ministers of government. Because of this, he has been labeled in the press as the czar of Moldova.

== Controversies ==
Birshtein is alleged to have ties to the Russian Mafia and the former Soviet KGB. He has been labeled in the press as an oligarch.

A former Soviet intelligence officer alleged that Birshtein's companies were used to hide the Soviet Communist Party's money in the Western countries.

In 1993 a commission set up by the Kyrgyz Parliament concluded that Birshtein, back then advisor to the incumbent President Askar Akaev, and his company Seabeco were responsible for the disappearance of 1.5 tons of state owned gold.

In July 1994, Moldovan journalist Nicolae Roșca, who had previously worked in Romania, declared that the Romanian state was on the verge of collapsing, and that "Bessarabia now has for a mission the recovery of its lost territories". He established a magazine to propagate the idea; called Patria Tînără, it was allegedly a front for Birshtein.

In 2002, the opposition PPCD described Birshtein as the "head of the international mafia who has been leading Moldova during the presidencies of Snegur, Lucinschi and Voronin".

Birshtein was also accused of selling overpriced medical masks to the Matei Balș Institute of Romania, headed by Adrian Streinu-Cercel, during the 2020 COVID-19 pandemic in Romania.
