= 1996 Moldovan presidential election =

- 17 November 1996 (first round); 1 December 1996 (second round)
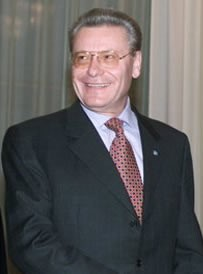

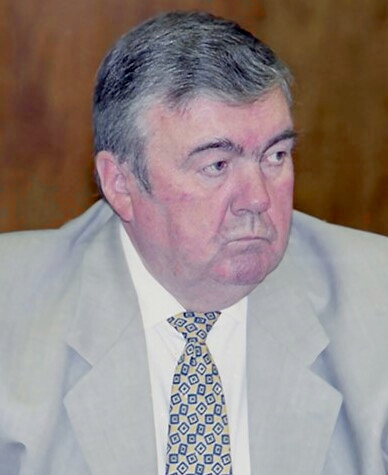
Nominee	Petru Lucinschi	Mircea Snegur
Party	Independent	PRCM
Popular vote	919,831	782,933
Percentage	54.02%	45.98%
President before election
Mircea Snegur
PCRM
Elected President
Petru Lucinschi
Independent

Presidential elections were held in Moldova on 17 November 1996, with a second round on 1 December. Whilst incumbent President Mircea Snegur received the most votes in the first round, he was defeated in the second by Petru Lucinschi. It was the first contested presidential election in Moldovan history, the first Moldovan presidential election in which an incumbent lost re-election, and the last direct presidential election until 2016.

== Results ==
Candidate	Party	First round		Second round	
Candidate	Party	Votes	%	Votes	%
Mircea Snegur	Party of Rebirth and Conciliation	603,652	38.75	782,933	45.98
Petru Lucinschi	Independent	430,836	27.66	919,831	54.02
Vladimir Voronin	Party of Communists	159,393	10.23		
Andrei Sangheli	Democratic Agrarian Party	147,555	9.47		
Valeriu Matei	Party of Democratic Forces	138,605	8.90		
Marina Livițchi	Independent	33,115	2.13		
Anatol Plugaru	Independent	28,159	1.81		
Iuliana Gorea-Costin	Independent	9,926	0.64		
Veronica Abramciuc	Independent	6,619	0.42		
Total		1,557,860	100.00	1,702,764	100.00
Valid votes		1,557,860	95.30	1,702,764	97.40
Invalid/blank votes		76,801	4.70	45,375	2.60
Total votes		1,634,661	100.00	1,748,139	100.00
Registered voters/turnout		2,399,156	68.13	2,441,074	71.61
Source: Nohlen & Stöver
