= Lipceni =

- Commune
- Location within Moldova
- Coordinates: 47°48′32″N 28°52′11″E
- Country: Moldova
- District: Rezina District

Government
  - Mayor: Aurel Pleșco (Independent)

Population (2014 census)
  - Total: 502
- Time zone: UTC+2 (EET)
  - Summer (DST): UTC+3 (EEST)

Lipceni is a village in Rezina District, Moldova.
