= Alexandru Musteață =

Moldovan intelligence official

Alexandru Musteață is a Moldovan politician, political scientist and intelligence official who has served as the director of the Security and Intelligence Service of Moldova since 2 June 2022 under President Maia Sandu.

== Early life and career ==
He was born on 30 March 1988. Born in the Moldovan SSR and therefore a Moldovan citizen by birth, he also holds Romanian citizenship. Musteață graduated with his bachelor's degree from Perspectiva-INT University. He later received a master's degree in Political Science (specializing in national security studies) from the University of the Academy of Sciences of Moldova and also attended the College of Europe in Bruges, Belgium, where he obtained a master's degree in European Political and Administrative Studies.

Between 2010 and 2012, he acted as the secretary-general of the National Youth Council of Moldova. He was also working as an expert at the NATO Documentation Center in Moldova. From 2013 to 2020, he worked at the Soros Foundation-Moldova, including serving as the director of the Good Governance Department. Musteață was appointed September 2021, as a senior state advisor on anti-corruption policies to Prime Minister Natalia Gavrilița. Concurrently, he was appointed as a member of the Central Electoral Commission. On 2 June 2022, the Parliament of the Republic of Moldova appointed Musteață as the director of the SIS for a five-year term, following the resignation of Aleksandr Esaulenco. He was introduced to intelligence officers by President Maia Sandu later that day.

He speaks Romanian, English, French, and Russian.
