= Scumpia =

- Commune
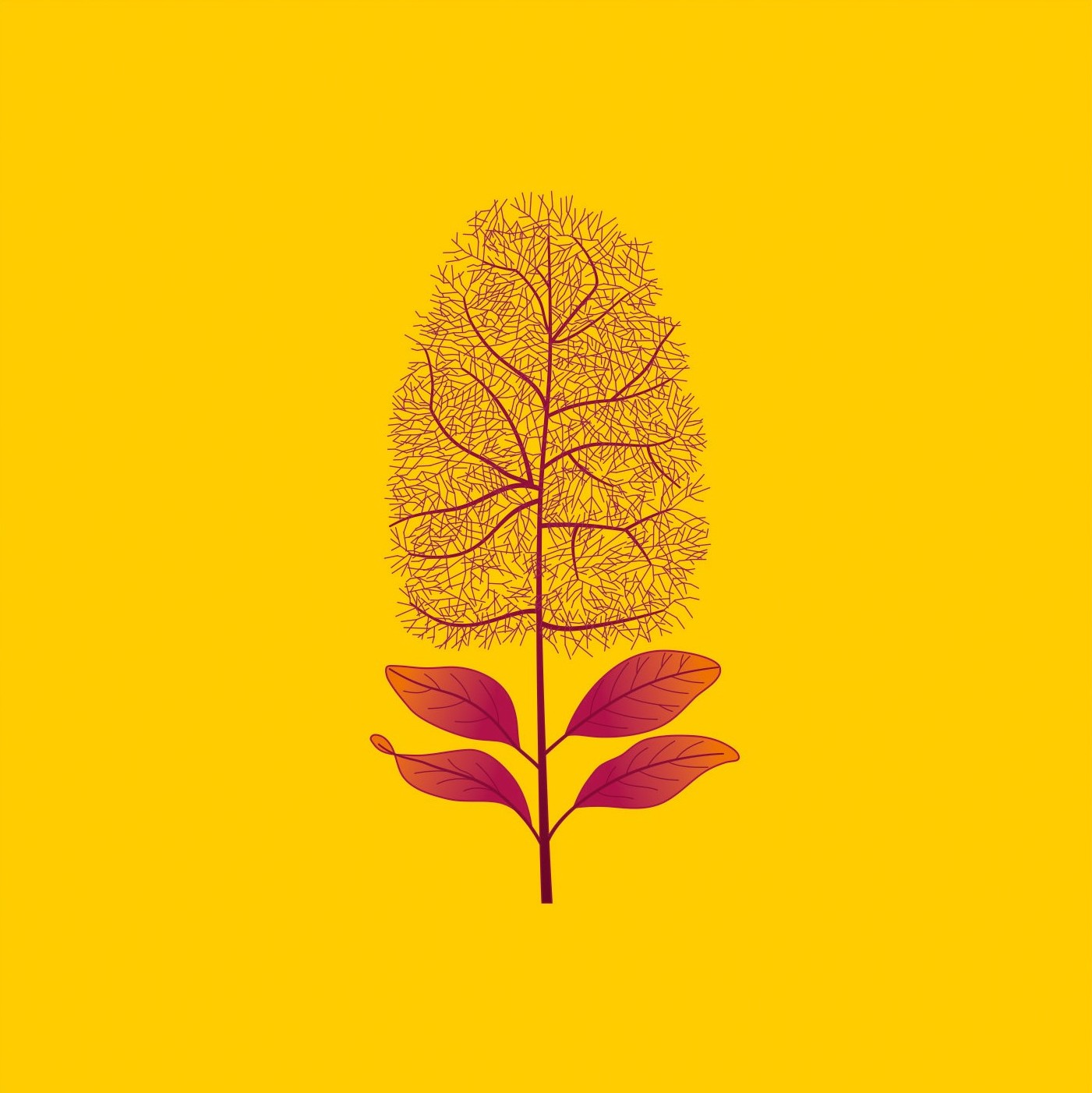
- Flag

- Location within Moldova
- Coordinates: 47°28′4″N 27°44′8″E
- Country: Moldova
- District: Fălești District

Government
  - Mayor: Petru Friptuleac (PL)

Area
  - Total: 3.45 km^{2} (1.33 sq mi)
- Elevation: 88 m (289 ft)

Population (2014)
  - Total: 3,243
- Time zone: UTC+2 (EET)
  - Summer (DST): UTC+3 (EEST)
- Postal code: MD-5949

Scumpia is a commune in Făleşti District, Moldova. It is composed of four villages: Hîrtop, Măgureanca, Nicolaevca, and Scumpia.

== Demography ==
According to the 2014 census, the commune has a population of 3,243 inhabitants.

== Geography ==
Scumpia is a commune and village located in Fălești District in northwestern Republic of Moldova. The commune consists of four villages: Scumpia itself, Hîrtop, Măgureanca, and Nicolaevca.

It is bordered by neighboring communes and villages within the same district, situated approximately 25 km from the district capital, Fălești, and about 150 km northwest of the national capital, Chișinău.
