= Anatol Plugaru =

Moldovan politician and lawyer (born 1951)

Anatol Plugaru OR

Minister of National Security
- In office 29 August 1991 – 1 July 1992
- President: Mircea Snegur
- Prime Minister: Valeriu Muravschi
- Preceded by: Tudor Botnaru
- Succeeded by: Vasile Calmoi

Member of the Moldovan Parliament
- In office 17 April 1990 – 29 August 1991
- Constituency: Criuleni

Personal details
- Born: Băhrinești, Moldavian SSR, Soviet Union

Anatol Plugaru (born 22 May 1951) is a politician and lawyer from Republic of Moldova who was Minister of National Security in 1991–1992. He was one of the signers of Declaration of Independence of Republic of Moldova on 27 August 1991.
