= Security and Intelligence Service of Moldova =

Moldovan state body

Security and Intelligence Service
- Romanian: Serviciul de Informații și Securitate (SIS)
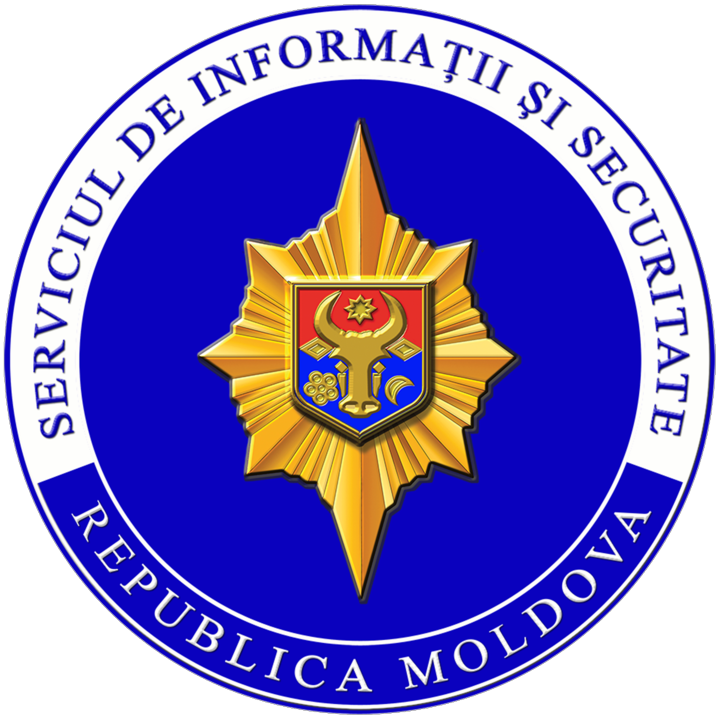

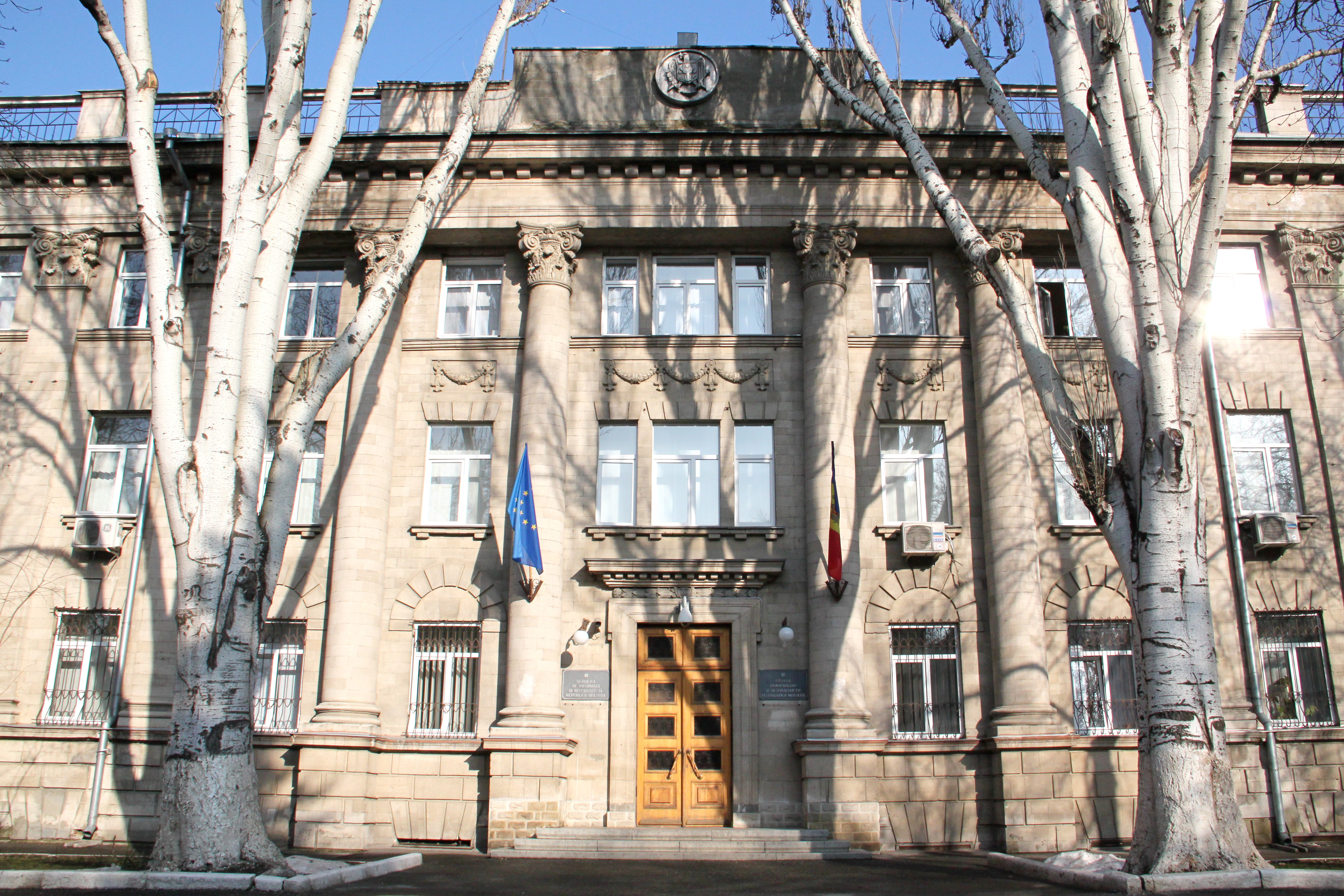
- Headquarters in Chișinău

Agency overview
- Formed: 16 November 1999
- Preceding agency: 9 September 1991, the Ministry of National Security of the Republic of Moldova
- Jurisdiction: President of Moldova, under the observation of the Parliament of Moldova
- Headquarters: 166 Stephen the Great Boulevard, Chișinău
- Agency executive: Alexandru Musteață, Director
- Website: www.sis.md

The Security and Intelligence Service (Romanian: Serviciul de Informații și Securitate, SIS) is a Moldovan state body specialized in ensuring national security by exercising all appropriate intelligence and counter-intelligence measures, such as: collecting, processing, checking and capitalizing the information needed to identify, prevent and counteract any actions that according to law represent an internal or external threat to independence, sovereignty, unity, territorial integrity, constitutional order, democratic development, internal security of the state, society and citizens, the statehood of the Republic of Moldova, the stable functioning of vitally important branches of the national economy, both on the territory of the Republic of Moldova and abroad.

The mission of the SIS is efficient protection of fundamental rights and freedoms of citizens, society and state against risks and threats to state security, promotion of democratic values and national interests of the Republic of Moldova.

The main objectives of the institution are:

- Gathering information relevant to national security of the Republic of Moldova, which provides basis for decision to state authorities;
- Anticipatory warning on the risks, threats and challenges for security, sovereignty, independence and integrity of the country;
- Conducting strategic assessments of national, regional and international environment of security.

== History ==
=== Ministry of National Security ===
- 1991, September 9 - by Presidential Decree of the Republic of Moldova no. 196 the State Security Committee is dissolved and the Ministry of National Security (MNS) of the Republic of Moldova is created.
- 1991, September 16 - The Government of Moldova approved the MNS basic functions and structure. Border protection becomes one of the main powers of the MNS.
- 1992, April 6 - MNS approved the Regulation of the Ministry of National Security of the Republic of Moldova.
- 1993, August 11 - by Presidential Decree no. 125 on Counterespionage Department, the Counterespionage Department is transferred from the Ministry of Defence to the Ministry of National Security and is directly subordinated to the Supreme Commander of the Armed Forces.
- 1995, October 31 - the Moldovan Parliament adopts Laws on state security and state security bodies, which are promulgated on 31 January 1997 by the President of the Republic of Moldova.
- 1997, September 9 - on occasion of commemorating six years since the creation of the Ministry of National Security, a presidential decree institutes the professional holiday - the Day of state security workers.

=== Security and Intelligence Service ===
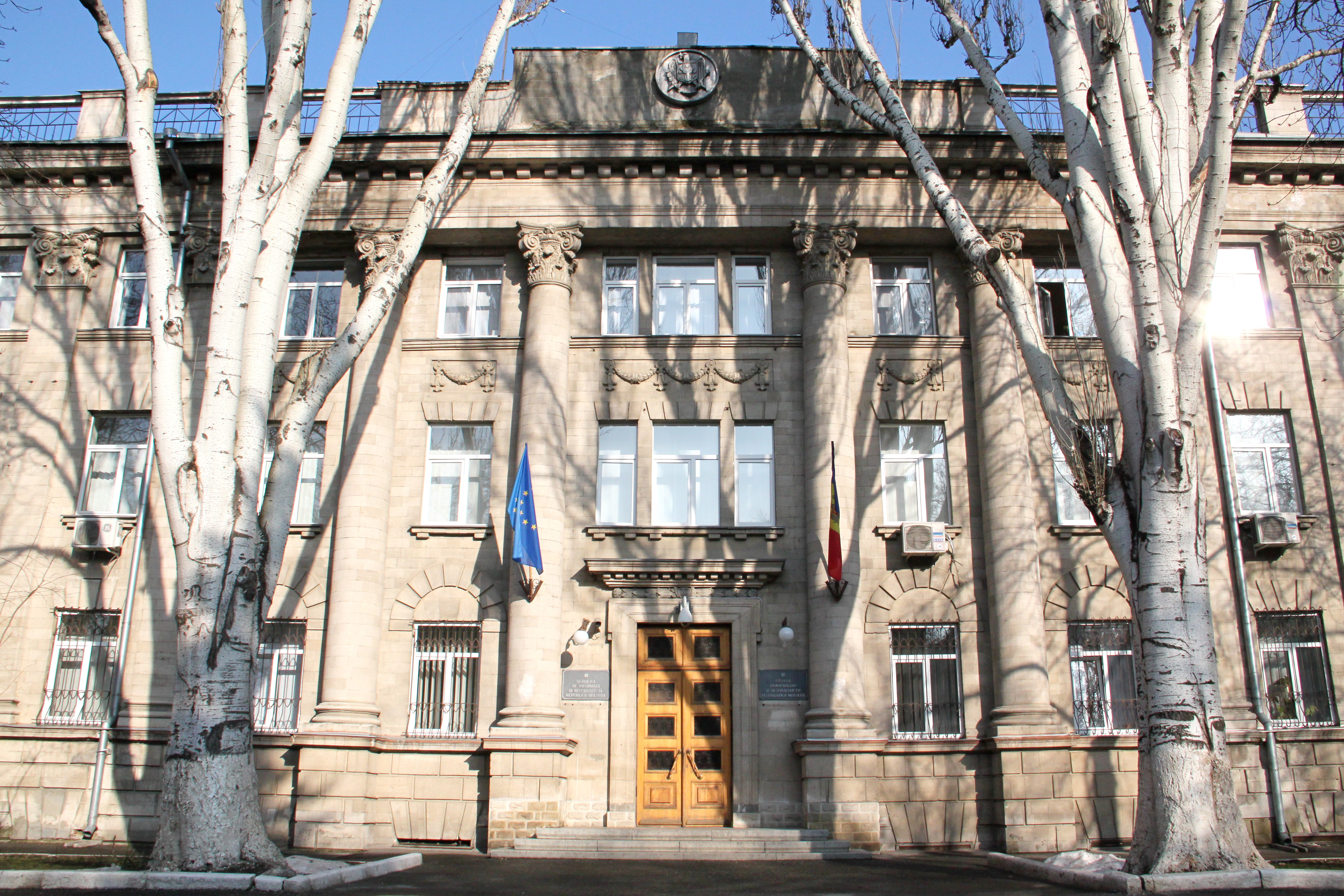
SIS Headquarters

- 1999, November 16 - the Law of the Republic of Moldova no. 676-XIV reorganized the Ministry of National Security into the Security and Intelligence Service (SIS) of Moldova, a body specialized in state security.
- 1999, December 23 - The Parliament of the Republic of Moldova adopted the Law no. 753-XIV on Security and Intelligence Service of the Republic of Moldova, establishing the main tasks and competences of the institution.
- 2000, January 18 - the RM Department of Border Guards is withdrawn from the SIS and reorganized into a public authority.
- 2002, September 10 - by RM Government Decision no. 1192, the National Institute of Intelligence and Security is established within the SIS as a higher education institution, created on the basis of SIS Training Centre.
- 2005, July 22 - by Law no.177-XVI on amending Law no. 753 - XIV of 23 December 1999 on the Security and Intelligence Service of Moldova, the SIS competences are provided in a new edition, where the power to conduct criminal prosecution is excluded from the SIS competences.
- 2006, November 13 - by RM Government Decision no.1295, the Antiterrorist Centre of the Security and Intelligence Service of the Republic of Moldova is created. It is responsible for managing, coordinating and implementing counter-terrorism measures.
- 2007, July 19 - Moldovan Parliament approved the Law no. 170 on status of the security and intelligence officer.
- 2009, February 10 - by RM Government Decision no. 124, the National Institute of Intelligence and Security is given the name "Bogdan, the Founder of Moldova".
- 2010, February 13 - by RM Governmental Decision no. 84 on the transfer of a state enterprise, the Special Telecommunications Centre (CTS) is transferred from the Security and Intelligence Service of the Republic of Moldova to the management of the State Chancellery (CTS was created in subordination of the SIS on 11 June 2002 - though the Government Decision no. 735 on special telecommunication systems of Moldova - in order to protect important information for the state, create, manage and ensure the operation and development of special national telecommunication systems).

== Directors of Security and Intelligence Service ==
#	Name (birth–death)	In office	
1	Tudor Botnaru (1935–2017)	July 1990	29 August 1991
2	Anatol Plugaru (born 1941)	29 August 1991	1 July 1992
3	Vasile Calmoi (born 1946)	1 July 1992	24 January 1997
4	Tudor Botnaru (1935–2017)	24 January 1997	11 May 1999
5	Valeriu Pasat (born 1958)	11 May 1999	21 December 2001
6	Ion Ursu (born 1948)	21 December 2001	15 October 2007
7	Artur Reșetnicov (born 1975)	1 November 2007	11 September 2009
8	Gheorghe Mihai (born 1950)	25 September 2009	13 October 2011
9	Mihai Bălan (born 1954)	25 October 2012	21 December 2017
10	Vitalie Pîrlog (born 1974)	21 December 2017	21 February 2018
11	Vasile Botnari (born 1975)	3 May 2018	8 June 2019
12	Alexandru Esaulenco (born 1977)	25 June 2019	2 June 2022
13	Alexandru Musteață (born 1988)	2 June 2022	Incumbent

== Activity ==
=== Intelligence ===
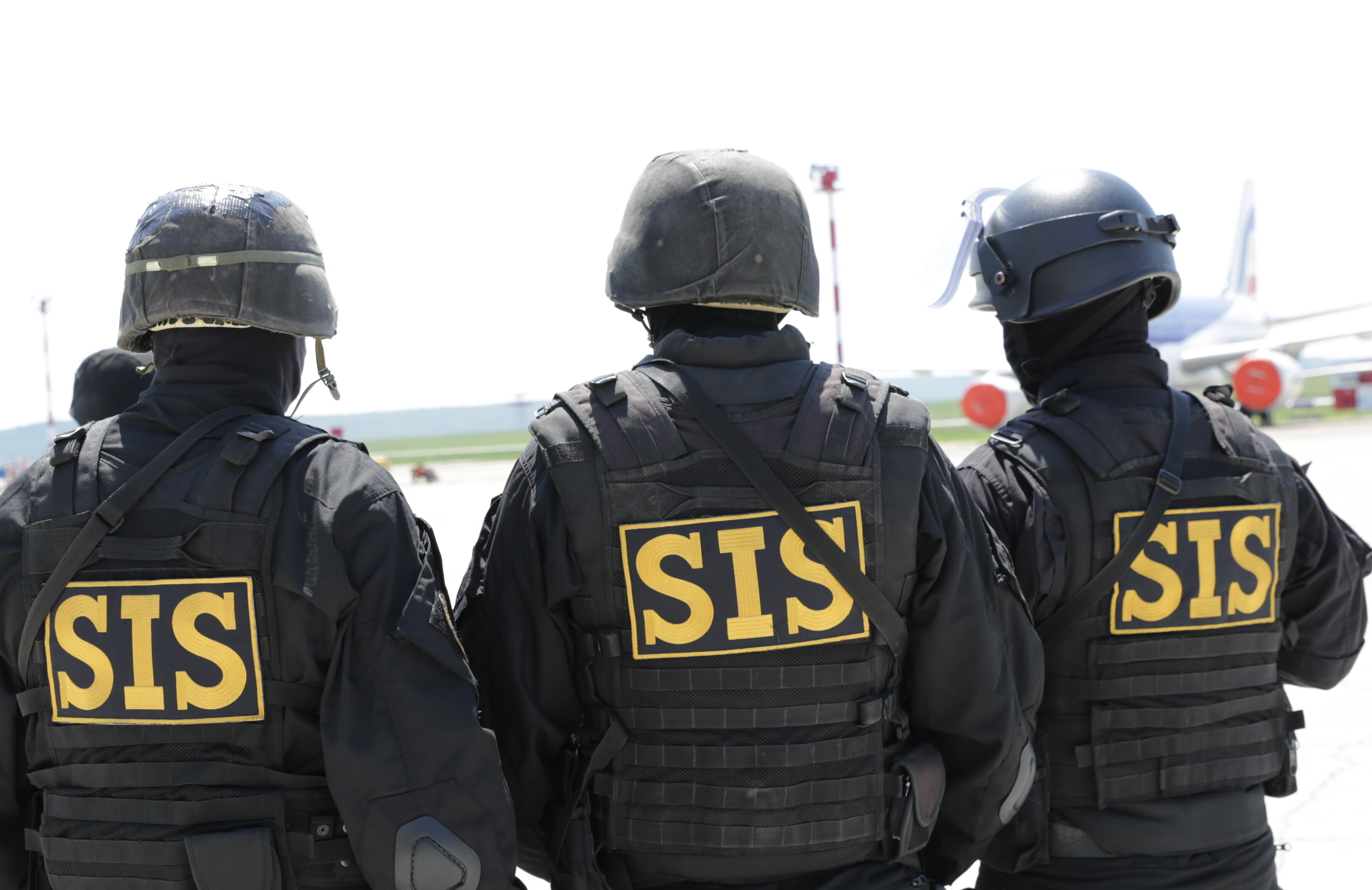
SIS officers

According to the art.8 of the Law on Security and Intelligence Service of the Republic of Moldova No 753-XIV of 23.12.1999, intelligence activity is directed to collecting data and information relevant to national security, in order to provide legal beneficiaries with a decision-making basis.

Operations for protection and promotion of national interests of the Republic of Moldova are conducted in order to reach the intelligence objectives.

The mission consists in carrying out a complex system of activities meant to identify, at an early stage, dangers and risks to national security reported to current threats.

The gathered information is analysed and integrated in analytical products regarding strategic assessment of the security environment that is generated by the globalization effects, in order to strengthen the profile of the Republic of Moldova as a contributor to regional and international security.

=== Counterintelligence ===
According to the art.8 of the Law on Security and Intelligence Service of the Republic of Moldova No 753-XIV of 23.12.1999, counterintelligence activity aims to identify, prevent and counteract risks and threats to the national security of the Republic of Moldova, deriving from espionage, subversive actions, plans and intentions of foreign intelligence agencies or paramilitary, terrorist, extremist and separatist groups.

Counterintelligence implies an operational and analytical management, meant to efficiently combine intelligence, creative practices and advanced technology, in order to act promptly and address unpredictable situations.

In particular, we are referring to identification of those actions and individuals, which can become targets for foreign intelligence agencies and adversary groups that carry out activities oriented against interests of the Republic of Moldova.

The exploration area, in order to protect the territorial integrity and sovereignty against direct, informational and hybrid aggression, includes the main strategic fields, such as politics, economics, social, military and technology.

The goal is to maintain and ensure national functional capacities from the perspective of human, technical, and logistic resources, considering their prompt adaptation in relation to asymmetrical risks, as well as using the development potential for the direct benefit of the citizens.

=== International Cooperation ===
Security of the Republic of Moldova is a component part of global security. Emergence of asymmetric threats in the era of contemporary globalization entails building sustainable partnerships within the complex system of intelligence community in order to reduce the risks that threaten national and regional security.

Preventing and combating security threats to Moldova is an approach where the Security and Intelligence Service cooperates with special services and partner structures at regional and international levels. After 1991, once the institution was founded, the evolution of the SIS cooperation partnerships witnessed positive dynamics, taking various forms: exchange of information and expertise, participation at specialized events and accomplishment of joint operations with foreign partners.

In the context of Moldova's integration into EU structures, the Service imperatively intends to join regional intelligence platforms, establish and promote bilateral and multilateral relations with line institutions at international arena. The goal pursued in this interaction is oriented towards fundamental national security interests and active involvement of the SIS in creating an adequate climate for regional and European security, aiming at the promotion of Moldova's image not only as security consumers but also as a generator of it.

=== Informational security ===
Cyberspace gets to be a comfortable platform for preparing and conducting computer crimes, cyber terrorism and other malicious actions designed to affect, directly or indirectly, the national security. Thus, the penetration of informational systems or electronic communication of public authorities and other institutions and public or private companies, which are dealing with sensitive information, may compromise the confidentiality, integrity or availability of this information, and therefore may cause financial or other damage, including the damage to state security. Also, penetration of informational systems afferent to critical infrastructure of the Republic of Moldova may result in unauthorized control over these systems, and therefore, in affecting the economic, social, political, informational, military and other kind of processes.

However, the global nature of informational systems and electronic communication networks, as well as transnational nature of cybercrime requires close coordination among all responsible institutions at both national and global level.

In this context, one of the primary missions is to prevent and combat aggression in virtual environment, internal or external, targeting electronic communication systems of national importance. This mission is carried out in accordance with the legislation in force through the following operational processes:

- developing proposals on ensuring informational security, developing and promoting of state policy and exercising control in ensuring the protection of state secret information in cyberspace;
- creating, ensuring the operation and security of governmental electronic communication systems, developing strategy and implementing national policy in the field of administration and ensuring the operation and security of special electronic communication systems;
- providing the state leadership, ministries, departments and other public authorities, including abroad, according to the Nomenclature prepared by the Government, with governmental communication, that is coded, secret and other types of telecommunications, organizing and ensuring their safety;
- tracking radio emissions of radio-electronic transmitters the activity of which endangers the state security.

=== Intelligence analysis ===
Intelligence analysis is the process of transformation of primary data, gathered by means of secret sources (HUMINT, SIGINT, IMINT, MASINT) or open sources (OSINT), in intelligence relevant for national security.

This activity means filtering, separating, comparing, and integrating the primary data. The result of this complex process is – producing intelligence products (complex document with timely, relevant and verified information, with assessment and forecasting elements).

The main effort of the SIS analysts is to apply valuable judgments, especially to uncertainties, incomplete data, ambiguous situations, towards orienting the data gathering process (for intelligence and counterintelligence components).

The outcome of intelligence analysis (intelligence product), usually, is disseminated to legal beneficiaries / decision-makers and is meant to support them in taking decisions of national interest in two priority directions:

a) prevention/ mitigation of risks, threats and vulnerabilities to national security;

b) use of opportunities to promote national interests.
