= Victoria Furtună =

Moldovan prosecutor and politician

- Furtună in 2024

Personal details
- Born: 24 February 1981 (age 45) Hîncești, Moldavian SSR, Soviet Union (now Moldova)
- Citizenship: Moldova; Romania
- Party: Greater Moldova Party (2025–present)
- Other political affiliations: Independent (2024–2025)
- Education: Free International University of Moldova
- Occupation: Politician, formerly prosecutor
- Awards: Eminent of the Prosecutor's Office chest badge (2016)
- Website: victoriafurtuna.md

Victoria Furtună (born 24 February 1981) is a Moldovan politician and former prosecutor. She worked as a prosecutor for 18 years, having been involved in numerous high-profile cases and having been considered for the position of acting Prosecutor General of Moldova in 2021. Furtună resigned amid a major scandal with the judicial system in March 2024 and announced four months later that she would run as an independent candidate at the 2024 Moldovan presidential election, in which she placed fifth with 4.45% of the votes. Afterwards, Furtună became on 2 March 2025 the leader of the Greater Moldova Party (PMM), which was excluded from the 2025 parliamentary election due to suspicions of illegal foreign funding, connections to Moldovan pro-Russian fugitive oligarch Ilan Shor and the promotion of the interests of a foreign state.

Furtună promoted a populist, anti-system, anti-Western and irredentist discourse and expressed her opposition of then President of Moldova Maia Sandu, promoting the "Moldovan language" and the neutrality of Moldova and maintaining a high presence in social media for her campaigning. She also expressed opposition to Moldova's accession to the European Union (EU) before U-turning on this stance after taking leadership of the PMM. Furtună was alleged to have held contact and received support from Shor and his group, particularly during her 2024 presidential campaign, and she was subject to sanctions in Moldova, the EU, Switzerland, Canada and Ukraine over her alleged connections with him and with Russian influence activities in Moldova.

== Prosecutor career ==
Victoria Furtună was born on 24 February 1981 in the town of Hîncești, in the Moldavian SSR of the Soviet Union (now Moldova). She graduated from the Free International University of Moldova in 2003 with a degree in law, later also obtaining a master's degree in law at the same university. As of 2024, Furtună was married and had two children. She speaks Romanian and Russian. She is a citizen of Romania as well.

Furtună began her career as prosecutor in 2006 at the Nisporeni District Prosecutor's Office. Two years later according to Moldovan TV channel Realitatea TV, she was transferred to the Chișinău Municipal Prosecutor's Office, in the Botanica sector of Chișinău. In 2016, she was awarded the Eminent of the Prosecutor's Office chest badge, being appointed on the same year as prosecutor at Moldova's Anti-Corruption Prosecutor's Office (PA). In October 2021, following the suspension of Alexandr Stoianoglo as Prosecutor General of Moldova, Furtună and Dumitru Robu were considered for serving as acting Prosecutor General, with the position ultimately being awarded to Robu.

In her 18-year-long career as prosecutor, Furtună handled several criminal cases involving high-ranking officials, mayors, ministers, members of the Parliament of Moldova, senior officials of Moldova's Ministry of Internal Affairs and colleagues of the Prosecutor's Office. She handled a corruption case accusing former Mayor of Chișinău Dorin Chirtoacă (the "paid parking case"), as well as a case in which former Minister of Transport and Roads Infrastructure Iurie Chirinciuc was accused of influence peddling and abuse of power. For some time, Furtună was among the prosecutors involved in the case against Moldovan pro-Russian fugitive oligarch Ilan Shor. She was in charge of the corruption case in which Shor-affiliated parliament members Marina Tauber and Reghina Apostolova were accused of committing large-scale bank fraud and of money laundering for the benefit of a criminal organized group, with Furtună subsequently withdrawing the charges.

Furtună resigned from her position as anti-corruption prosecutor on 11 March 2024 in the midst of a major scandal. Among her reasons, she included her disagreement with the alleged subordination of the judicial system to the ruling Party of Action and Solidarity (PAS). Furtună accused Moldova's Security and Intelligence Service (SIS) of including her on the list of people who threaten national security and of limiting her access to a file on "illegal actions by a group of people who are causing chaos in the judicial system" of Moldova. She also accused the SIS of violating the law and of wanting to be a loyal institution to the government. Furtună would have been included in such list after she initiated a case on 11 January that year that allegedly proved that public institutions of the Moldovan state had fabricated and spread false information against judges disloyal to the ruling government at the time. The day after her resignation, the Office of the Prosecutor General of Moldova (PG), with the approval of the PA's head Veronica Dragalin, searched Furtună's former office amid a criminal investigation in which she was suspect of having intentionally disclosed information from a criminal case investigated by the PA.

On 22 April that year, Furtună announced the creation of the Vox Populi, Vox Dei association, the objective of which would be monitoring and exposing major corruption cases through which millions of lei were being stolen from Moldova's citizens as she stated. She also stated to Moldovan news agency IPN Press Agency she had filed a complaint for "the usurpation of state powers" to the PG, calling for the prosecution of those who "continue to usurp judicial power in an abusive manner, solely for personal purposes"; as well as a complaint against then President of Moldova Maia Sandu demanding 1 million lei, which "will be redistributed to orphanages", in moral damages for having "intentionally defamed" her at a press conference on 18 March and not having responded to a request for a public apology from Furtună.

== Political career ==
=== 2024 Moldovan presidential election ===
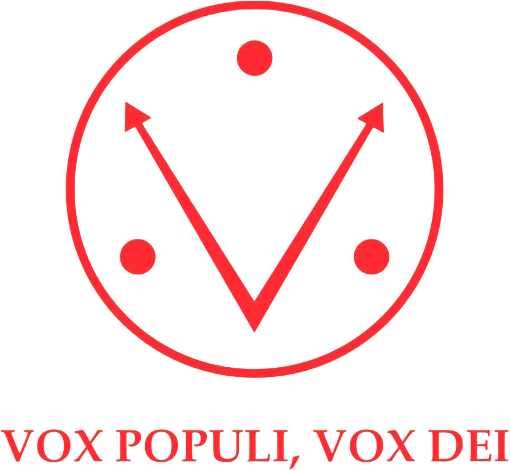
Logo of Victoria Furtună's 2024 Moldovan presidential election campaign

On 30 July, Furtună announced that she would run as an independent candidate in the 2024 Moldovan presidential election, to be held on 20 October. She made the announcement via a video filmed at the Suvorov Square in Tiraspol, in Moldova's Russian-backed unrecognized breakaway region of Transnistria, with the Suvorov Monument dedicated to Russian general Alexander Suvorov showing behind her. Furtună claimed that the ruling government in Chișinău intended to drag Moldova into the Russian invasion of Ukraine and unfreeze the Transnistria conflict. Holding a dove, she stated "I will do everything possible so that war does not come to our common home".

In her election campaign, Furtună described the following priorities: the reintegration of Transnistria into Moldova; the protection of Moldovans "wherever they are"; trade relations "with all countries of the globe"; promoting "our individuality", defined as Moldovan traditions and values, through international events, mass media, cinema and art; the maintenance of Moldova's neutrality; and multiple points dedicated to defense policy and to the modernization and strengthening of the Armed Forces of Moldova. Moldovan political analyst and Bogdan Petriceicu Hasdeu State University of Cahul rector Sergiu Cornea defined Furtună's promises as original but without sufficient explanation and argumentation to show the necessary actions for their fulfillment.

According to Moldovan newspaper Deschide.MD, Furtună coordinated her campaign with the Victory electoral bloc, led by the aforementioned Shor, as evidenced by what was purportedly spoken in a meeting of Victory in Chișinău on 27 September which would have been attended by Furtună, Shor (online) and several of the latter's affiliates such as Tauber, Vasile Bolea and Evghenia Guțul. On 4 October, Furtună held a meeting in Chișinău with around 30 people from the settlements of Sîngera, Dobrogea and Revaca. According to an investigation by Moldovan newspaper Ziarul de Gardă, these people were summoned through Telegram channels affiliated to Shor, with Furtună discussing anti-Western narratives promoted by Shor at the meeting. In addition, Deschide.MD provided a recording in which an activist of the Victory bloc reportedly incited voters to vote for Furtună in the election, and Victory's Basarabeasca District territorial organization head was purportedly shown in a video asking her subordinates to summon as many people as possible to a meeting with Furtună. Furtună denied being supported by Shor and stated that "someone is specially trying to take some actions and destroy my election campaign".

Furthermore, an investigation by Moldovan TV channel TV8, published on 14 October, argued that priests in northern Moldova had collected signatures for the registration of Furtună in the election, with signatories being stated that they were signing for other causes. These priests would have been mobilized by Maxim Guzun, secretary of the Diocese of Bălți and Fălești, of the Metropolis of Chișinău and All Moldova subordinated to the Russian Orthodox Church, whose archbishop Marchel Mihăescu openly endorsed Furtună for the election as "a frail woman, a Christian, a tender mother and an honest wife". Signatures for Furtună would have also been collected by Veaceslav Parasi, then the priest of Temeleuți in Florești District, in the Diocese of Soroca and Drochia of the same church. Both Guzun and Parasi, as well as other priests, had previously been detained, being found in possession of money retired from the Russian bank Sberbank. Reports existed at the time that priests of the Metropolis of Chișinău and All Moldova were getting involved in political activities and receiving money transferred through Mir cards from Russia.

Furtună obtained 68,778 (4.45%) of the votes in the first round of the presidential election, placing fifth out of eleven candidates. She won over a quarter of the votes in Gagauzia and in Orhei and Taraclia districts, finishing second, third and second there respectively. These three units accounted for more than 40% of the votes she received nationwide, with modest results in the remaining districts. Nationwide, Furtună surpassed former Prime Minister Ion Chicu and former parliament member Octavian Țîcu, and she obtained almost twice as many votes in Gagauzia as its former Governor Irina Vlah. Moldovan sociologist Vasile Cantarji noted that Gagauzia, Orhei and Taraclia had a rich history of electoral fraud committed by Shor and his group. In the second round, Furtună endorsed the aforementioned Stoianoglo, the opponent of then incumbent president Sandu who had been proposed by the Party of Socialists of the Republic of Moldova (PSRM). Furtună was in the ninth place on the ballot's order of candidates for the first round.

=== Greater Moldova Party ===
Logo adopted by the Greater Moldova Party (PMM) after Furtună became its president

On 2 March 2025, Furtună took over leadership of the Greater Moldova Party (PMM). Despite her anti-European stance during her 2024 presidential election campaign, after becoming the party's leader, Furtună declared to Ziarul de Gardă that the process of Moldova's integration into the European Union (EU) could not be stopped "and I do not see it opportune to stop it either, especially at this stage, when there are also benefits". Furtună presented the party on 25 March, stating that it advocated for Moldova's neutrality and the restoration of the "Moldovan language" over Romanian as the official language in Moldova. The party would also seek to implement a tax reform, industrialize the state, reform the educational system, provide fair pensions, support small businesses, optimize institutions and redistribute military spending.

In a July analytical article for Romanian newspaper Libertatea, Romanian disinformation expert Nicolae Țibrigan described Furtună as employing a populist, pro-Moldovan statehood and anti-system discourse, spreading messages against the West and against Sandu and making extensive use of social media for her campaigning, particularly Facebook, Telegram and TikTok. In the opinion of Țibrigan, in the context of the then upcoming 2025 Moldovan parliamentary election, Furtună seemed to play a calibrated role aimed at dividing centrist voters and to fuel the "soft radicalization" of a sector of voters who, unwilling to vote for Sandu's ruling PAS, would not fit either with more moderate opposition parties (PSRM, Alternative).

On 18 May, Furtună called for the return of Ukraine's region of Budjak to Moldova and ensure access to the sea for Moldova, stating that "I know how to return Budjak today, and this is more relevant than ever". On 2 July, after having visited the Putna Monastery in Romania where prominent Voivode of Moldavia Stephen the Great is buried, Furtună stated that "we address all Moldovans whether they live east or west of the Prut, in the north or in the south", "we are the same people, with deep roots, a pure soul and a history that unites us, not separate us" and "we will move forward for Greater Moldova". In reaction, Moldovan politician and former Minister of Defense Anatol Șalaru called Furtună "a joke in bad taste even for the Russians", who were hoping that she would become "a Călin Georgescu of the Republic of Moldova" as he stated. Furthermore, having been asked in an April interview about the idea of Moldova's potential unification with Romania, Furtună stated "only if this country will be called Greater Moldova and the Parliament will be in Chișinău, and if the president will be Victoria Furtună"; she had previously criticized the commemoration of the Day of the Union of Bessarabia with Romania every 27 March by unionist Moldovans.

On 15 July, the EU expanded its list of sanctioned Moldovan politicians and entities close to Shor, including Furtună among others. The EU deemed these individuals and entities responsible for actions aimed at destabilizing or threatening Moldova's sovereignty and independence. As a result of the sanctions, Furtună would no longer be able to travel to the EU, and any asset of hers within EU member states would be blocked. On 25 July, Moldova's Interinstitutional Supervisory Council, headed by prime minister Dorin Recean, included most of these individuals and entities, including Furtună, on the Moldovan authorities' sanctions list, as they "help Shor bring disorder and destabilization to our country" as Recean stated, which would result in their bank accounts being blocked. Switzerland joined the EU's 15 July sanctions against Furtună and the others on 12 August. On 28 August, Canada imposed sanctions against Furtună, 15 other individuals and two entities in Moldova, as they would be involved in actions of Russian interference before the 2025 parliamentary election in the country. As a result, these individuals and entities would be unable to enter Canada, their assets in the country would be blocked and any financial transactions with them would be prohibited. On 20 September, Ukraine sanctioned 11 Moldovan politicians and activists, including Furtună, that it accused of destabilizing Moldova in the interest of Russia, promoting pro-Russian narratives and justifying Russia's military aggression against Ukraine. The sanctions, with a duration of 10 years and the possibility of being extended indefinitely, included, among others, asset freezing, commercial and financial restrictions and a ban on entry to Ukraine.

A report by the Central Electoral Commission of Moldova (CEC) on the results of the financial monitoring of Furtună's initiative group and campaign during the 2024 presidential election and EU membership constitutional referendum, which took place from 6 November 2024 to 31 July 2025, found that the financial reports submitted by Furtună to the CEC generally corresponded to primary accounting records, although 229,636 lei used for the development of a website, videos and their promotion were not reflected in her reports. On 14 August, the CEC asked Furtună to pay this amount of money to the state budget before 17:00 EEST on 19 August since it did not appear in the financial reports of her campaign and was used in violation of legal provisions.

On 26 September, two days before the parliamentary election, the CEC annulled the registration of the PMM and of its list of candidates, excluding the party from the election. This was on the grounds and under the suspicions that the party benefited from illegal foreign funding, that it held connections with formations created by Shor and that it promoted the interests of a foreign state, with the CEC having taken this decision after receiving information from the SIS and other institutions. The CEC also noted Furtună's sanctioned status in the EU for destabilizing actions against Moldova. In response, Furtună suggested she would appeal the decision, accused the members of the CEC of carrying out an order from the government and of "persecuting" and "quarreling" with her party and filed a series of recusal requests against some members of the institution which were rejected. Later, on 30 September, the Ministry of Justice sent a request to the Central Court of Appeal to limit the PMM's activity for 12 months over illegal funding of the party and its "succession" from the unconstitutional Șor Party, which happened on 2 October as a precautionary measure until a final verdict was made on the party's case.
