= Maria Cosniceanu =

Maria Cosniceanu (born February 4, 1935) is a Moldovan linguist, with interests in onomastics.

She was born in the village of Temeleuți, Florești, then Soroca County (Romania). Graduating from the Philology Department of the Chișinău State University (now the Moldova State University) in 1957, for one year she worked as a teacher in a school in Hânceşti. Since 1958 all her life he worked at the Institute of Philology of the Academy of Sciences of Moldova.

In 2022 a book devoted to her was published, Maria Cosniceanu: In Service of Correct Names.

== Books ==
- Nume de persoană (with Anatol Eremia) (1964, 1968, 1974)
  - the first anthroponymic guide for the Republic of Moldova
- Studiu asupra numelor de persoană (1973)
- În lumea numelor (1981)
- Reflecții asupra numelor (1986)
- Dicționar cu prenume și nume de familie (1991, 1993, 1999)
  - After the Moldovan Declaration of Independence and the subsequent recognition that the Moldovan language is the Romanian language and the proclamation the latter to be the state language of Moldova, returning to the Latin script, Cosniceanu compiled end edited this dictionary.
- Dicționar de prenume (2006, 2010)
- Nume de familie (Din perspectivă istorică). Chișinău: Pontos, 2004 (vol. I), 2010 (vol. II), 2018 (vol. III).

== Awards ==
- 2005: Medal of Civic Merit
- 2010: Dimitrie Cantemir Medal of the Moldovan Academy of Science
- 2010: First Degree Diploma of the Government of the Republic of Moldova
