= 2024 Moldovan presidential election =

- 20 October 2024 (first round); 3 November 2024 (second round)
- Turnout: 51.74% (first round) ▲6.06 pp 54.29% (second round) ▲1.53 pp
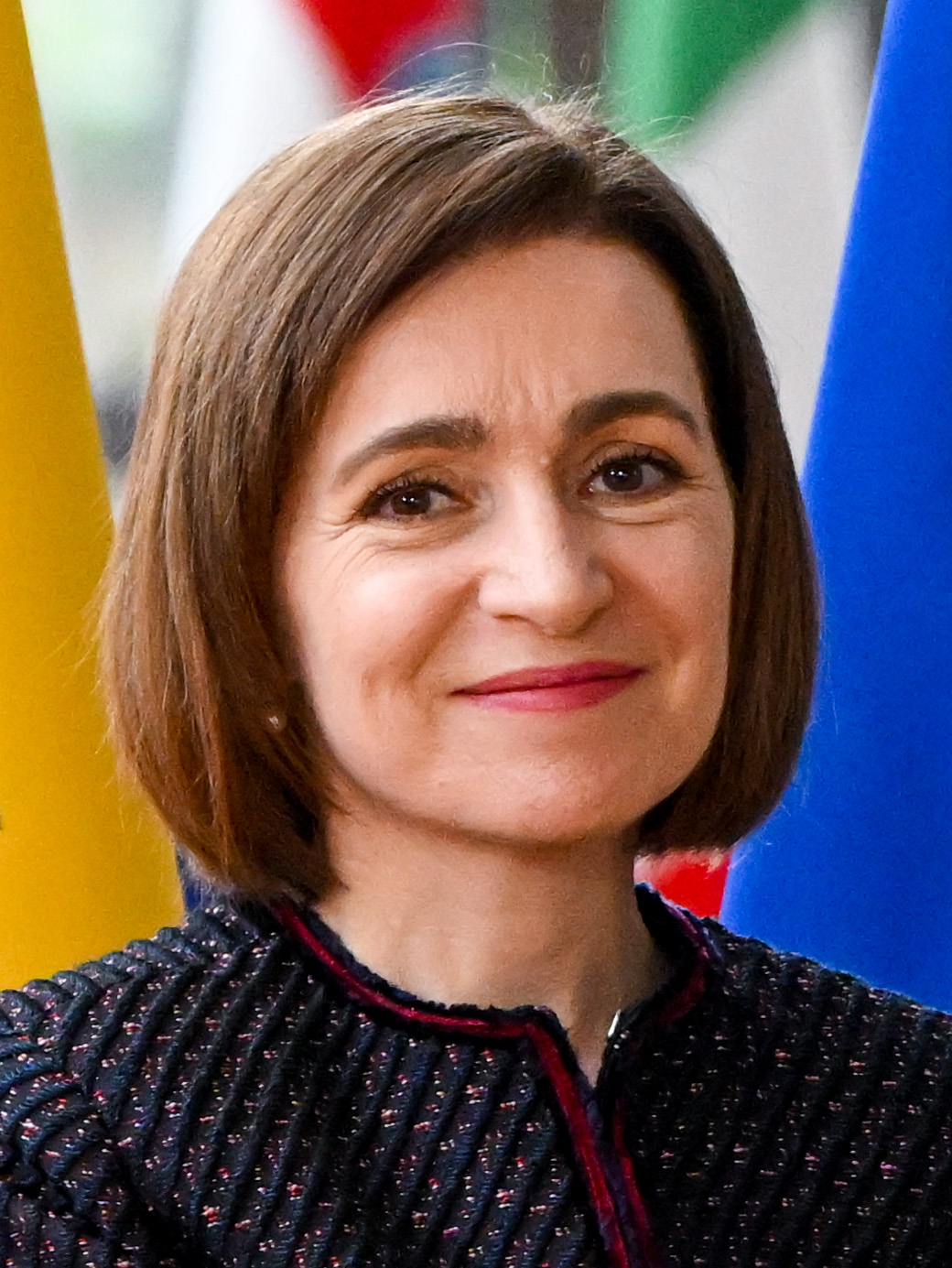

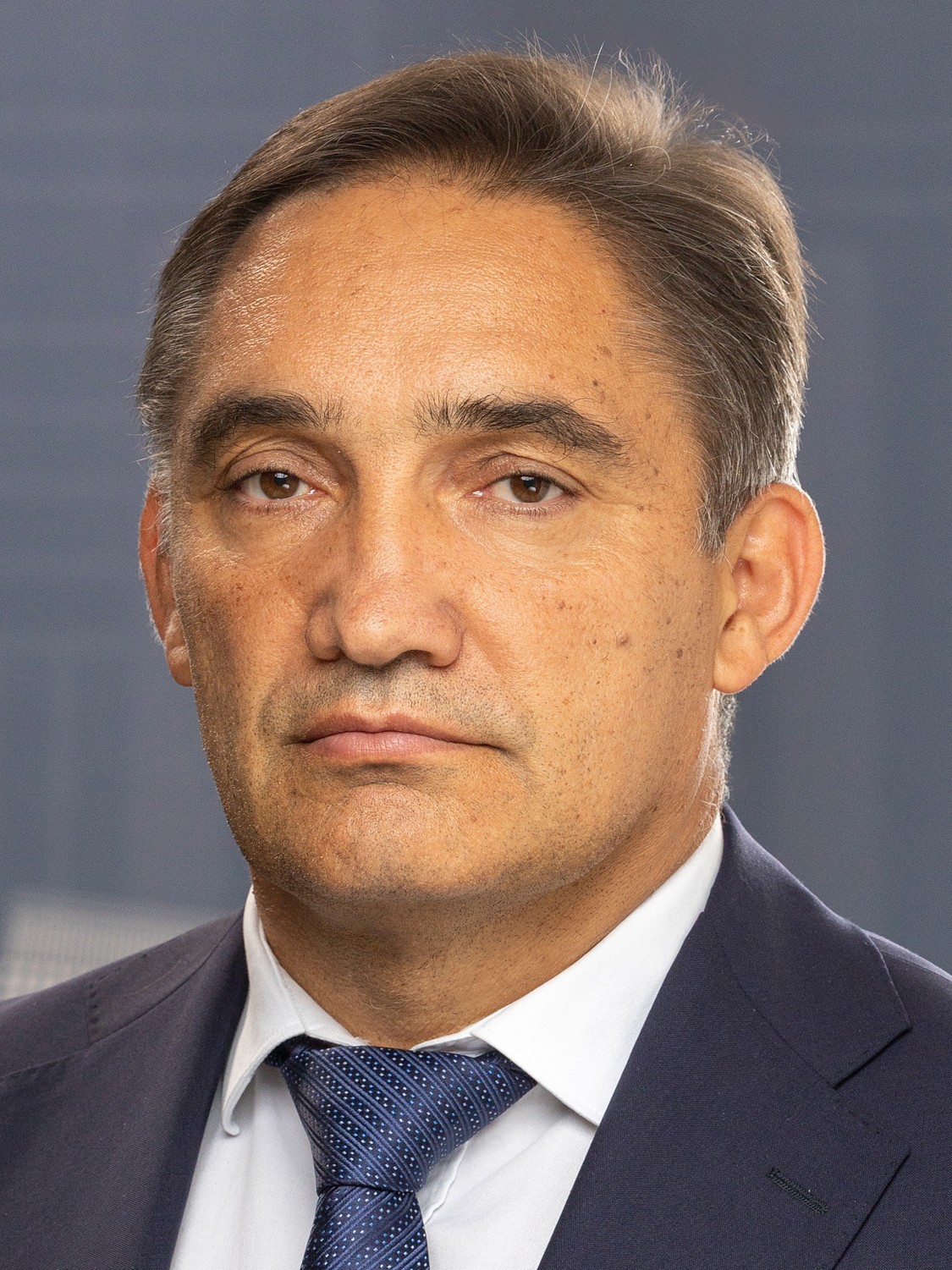
Candidate	Maia Sandu	Alexandr Stoianoglo
Party	Independent	Independent
Alliance	PAS (Note: The President of Moldova traditionally resigns from party membership after taking office. Although Sandu was officially an independent, her campaign was endorsed and funded by Party of Action and Solidarity. On the election ballot, Maia Sandu was designated as a PAS candidate.)	PSRM (Note: Although Stoianoglo was officially an independent, his campaign was endorsed and funded by Party of Socialists of the Republic of Moldova. On the election ballot, Alexandr Stoianoglo was designated as a PSRM candidate.)
Popular vote	930,139	750,430
Percentage	55.35%	44.65%
President before election
Maia Sandu
Independent
Elected President
Maia Sandu
Independent

Presidential elections were held in Moldova on 20 October 2024, with a runoff held on 3 November. Incumbent president Maia Sandu, who won the first round, and former Prosecutor General Alexandr Stoianoglo, who was the runner-up, contested the runoff, with Sandu winning a majority of votes and being re-elected for a second and final term.

The Guardian described the election as a choice between the West and Russia, with Sandu representing the pro-European side and Stoianoglo the Russian-friendly side. Renato Usatîi, who finished third in the first round, declined to back either candidate in the runoff. Romanian Insider described Victoria Furtună and Vasile Tarlev, who came in fifth and sixth, as backed by the pro-Russian oligarch Ilan Shor.

On the same day as the first round of the election, a narrow majority of Moldovans voted "yes" to add the desire for EU membership to the country's constitution. This was seen as a victory for Sandu who campaigned for the "yes" side, although the result was closer than expected, a fact Sandu blamed on alleged Russian-sponsored interference on the election, including vote buying organised by Russian-trained groups. OSCE described international observers as assessing the first round's conduct "overwhelmingly positively", although OSCE also noted misuse of administrative resources and unbalanced media coverage in favor of the incumbent. Analysts stated Sandu's runoff victory was seen as a major relief for the current government, which strongly backed her candidacy, her push for closer ties with the West, and her support for Moldova's path toward the European Union.

== Electoral system ==
=== Date ===
On 17 April 2024, Parliament speaker Igor Grosu announced the holding of the presidential election in conjunction with the constitutional referendum on European Union (EU) accession on 20 October. The decision was approved by the Parliament of Moldova on 16 May.

=== Eligibility requirements ===
The Constitution of Moldova (Article 78, Clause 2) defines four conditions that a presidential candidate must satisfy: Moldovan citizenship, at least 40 years of age, residence in Moldova for at least 10 years, and ability to speak the state language. Article 80 of the Constitution establishes a term limit: one individual cannot serve more than 2 terms in a row.

=== Procedure ===
Candidates can be nominated by a political party, an electoral alliance, or run as independents. They have to collect at least 15,000 voter signatures in their support from at least half of Moldova's level 2 administrative territorial units with at least 600 signatures in each of them. The election results can be considered valid only if the turnout is above or equal to 33.33%. The candidate who receives an absolute majority of the votes is elected president. If no candidate receives a majority of the votes, a second round between the top 2 candidates is held two weeks after the first round. The candidate with the largest number of votes in the second round then becomes president.

== Security concerns ==
Moldovan authorities have accused Russian-trained groups of plotting to destabilise the election.

In June 2024, the United States, the United Kingdom, and Canada issued a joint statement on Russian influence within the Moldovan election. At the same time, the US also announced sanctions against the Governor of Gagauzia Evghenia Guțul, who it alleged is an "active facilitator" of Russian-backed election influence.

In September 2024, incidents of vandalism on the offices of the Supreme Court of Justice of Moldova and on the public broadcaster Teleradio-Moldova were attributed to the said groups. In October 2024, authorities announced the discovery of a plot by exiled pro-Russian oligarch Ilan Shor involving $15 million in funds from Russia that were distributed to around 130,000 people in order to bribe voters into selecting anti-Western decisions, and spread disinformation against the European Union on social media, following raids on 26 locations nationwide. Russia denied the accusations. Security checks were strengthened at Chișinău International Airport following an influx of passengers from Russia carrying large amounts of cash believed to be connected with the plot.

Later that month, Moldova accused Russia of plotting to bus in voters to polling stations at the Moldovan Embassy in Moscow. In response, the EU imposed sanctions on five officials from the autonomous Gagauzia region and on one Russian-based entity involved in the influence operation. The United States accused Russia of spending "millions of dollars" to support its preferred parties and spreading disinformation online. The Russian foreign ministry in turn accused Moldova of printing only 10,000 ballots for 500,000 eligible Moldovans living in Russia.

On 17 October, Moldovan authorities announced the discovery of another plot in which 100 youths were trained in Moscow, Serbia and Bosnia by private military groups to foment civil unrest, including using nonlethal weapons to create "mass disorder" during the election and referendum, adding that four people had been arrested and that some of them received several thousand euros in payments.

Olga Roșca, a foreign policy adviser to Sandu, said that "Russia is pouring millions in dirty money to hijack our democratic processes. This isn't just meddling, it's full-blown interference aimed at destabilising our future. And it is alarming."

The European Union deployed its Cyber Rapid Response Team led by Lithuania to Moldova in order to oversee cybersecurity concerns in the election and referendum following a request from the Moldovan Information Technology and Cyber Security Service.

On 31 October, authorities raided a political party headquarters and accused 12 people of engaging in vote-buying. Forty government employees were also placed under investigation for selling their votes. On 1 November, Prime Minister Dorin Recean reported cases of "anonymous death threats via phone calls" being made on citizens nationwide, which he described as an attempt to scare voters. On the day of the runoff vote, the CEC said that it had received reports of organised and illegal transportation of voters to Russia, Belarus, Azerbaijan and Turkey. Stanislav Secrieru, a national security adviser to Sandu, wrote on X: "We are seeing massive interference by Russia in our electoral process," which he said had a "high potential to distort the outcome" of the vote.

Moldovan citizens living abroad, mostly those working or studying overseas, who were eligible to vote faced other security issues at the second round of voting including false bomb threats at polling stations that temporarily disrupted voting in multiple cities in Germany and in Liverpool and Northampton in the United Kingdom. After polling stations in Germany, located in Hamburg, Frankfurt, Kaiserslautern and Berlin were targeted by bomb threats, the German government, via foreign minister Annalena Baerbock condemned the "massive, coordinated attempt" to prevent Moldovans abroad voting, describing bomb threats against Moldovan polling stations in Germany as "totally unacceptable".

On 6 November, the Russian foreign ministry summoned Moldovan ambassador Lilian Darii to complain about Moldova barring eight Russian election observers from entering the country to monitor the election and referendum. Following the election, the Moldovan government served a note on 12 November to the Russian ambassador Oleg Ozerov formally complaining about Moscow's interference.

== Election ==
=== First round ===
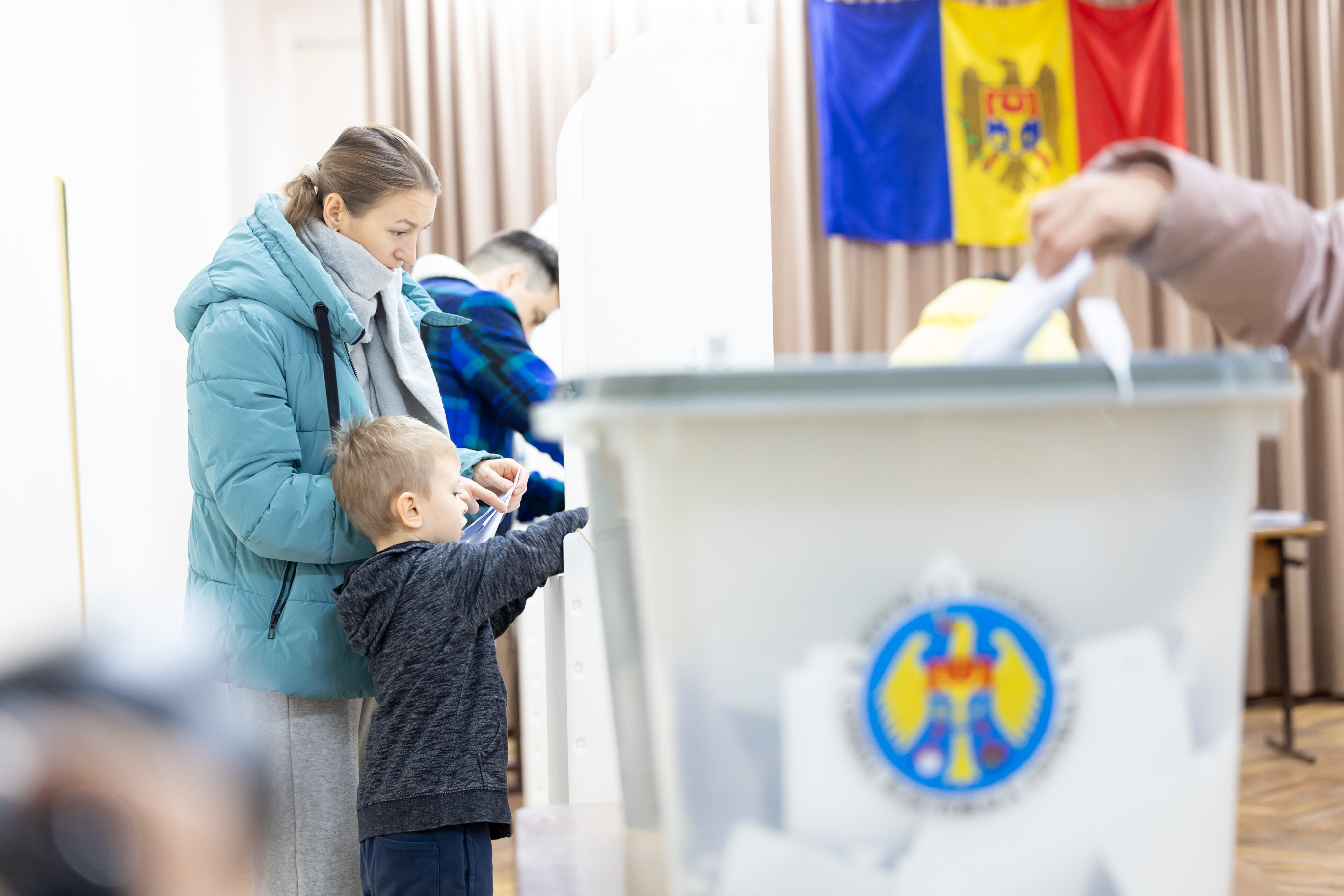
Voting in a polling station on 20 October

Approximately 2.8 million ballots were issued for the election and the EU membership constitutional referendum. For the first time in Moldova, ballots were featured not only in Romanian but also in as many as five minority languages. Thus, 2,092,641 ballots were in Romanian, 631,979 in Russian, 3,400 in Gagauz, 991 in Bulgarian, 870 in the Romani language and 115 in Ukrainian. For voters in the pro-Russian separatist region of Transnistria, 90,000 ballots were issued, of which 45,000 were in Romanian and the rest in Russian.

For the election and the referendum, 234 polling stations were opened abroad. The first vote in both was cast by Ludmila Vizdoagă, a woman who at the time had lived in South Korea for 19 years. She traveled from Seoul to Tokyo to vote in the polling station for Japan, which was the first to be opened. A polling station was also set up in Varnița to serve voters from Transnistria.

Voting was held from 07:00 to 21:00. As of 15:00, the minimum turnout of 33.33% necessary for the validation of the election had been reached with a turnout of 35.57%.

=== Second round ===
1,988 polling stations were opened throughout Moldova, including 30 that were utilised for voters living in Transnistria who had to go to Moldovan-held territory. Promo-LEX observers detected 109 incidents at polling stations or in their immediate vicinity. These included the presence of electoral advertising material near polling stations, electoral agitation, the unjustified presence of unauthorized persons, violations of the secrecy of the vote, obstruction of access to observers and unjustified interruption of the vote.

=== Campaign ===
Launching her re-election campaign, Sandu condemned Russia's invasion of Ukraine as a threat to regional stability and Moldova's sovereignty. She identified both Russia and corruption as the biggest challenges facing Moldova, emphasizing that addressing these issues is crucial for Moldova's security and its aspirations for closer integration with the European Union. In the presidential debate, Sandu accused Stoianoglo of being a "Trojan horse" candidate for outside interests wanting control of Moldova. She said she would continue her pro-European course, saying, "Joining the European Union is Moldova's Marshall Plan".

Stoianoglo said that he was in favour of joining the EU and that "the level of Russian interference in Moldova is highly exaggerated", adding that he would seek a "reset of relations" with Russia. He expressed his intention to bridge differences with Moldova's separatist Transnistria region. In response to accusations, Stoianoglo stated that he had no connections to Ilan Shor, the fugitive pro-Russian businessman who admitted to paying voters to cast "no" ballots in the EU membership constitutional referendum. Stoianoglo did not condemn Russia's 2022 invasion of Ukraine, describing it as "a continuing tragedy" and suggesting that he would be willing to meeting Vladimir Putin.

Renato Usatîi, who finished third in the first round of the 2020 presidential election, sought to adopt a middle ground between Russia and Western Europe.

== Candidates ==
Between 21 and 31 August, the Central Electoral Commission of Moldova (CEC) received 23 applications for the registration of initiative groups in support of 19 candidates, of which 13 applications were accepted. Two of these initiative groups failed to get their candidate registered in the election.

Name	Born	Campaign	Experience	Party	Status
Maia Sandu	24 May 1972 (54); Risipeni, Fălești	(website)	President of Moldova (2020–present); Prime Minister of Moldova (2019); Minister of Education (2012–2015)	Independent	Registered
Alexandr Stoianoglo	3 June 1967 (59); Comrat, Gagauzia		Prosecutor General of Moldova (2019–2021); Vice President of the Parliament (2009–2010)	Independent	Registered
Renato Usatîi	4 November 1978 (47); Fălești	(website)	Mayor of Bălți (2015–2018, 2019–2021)	Our Party	Registered
Vasile Tarlev	9 October 1963 (62); Bașcalia, Basarabeasca	(website)	Prime Minister of Moldova (2001–2008)	Future of Moldova Party endorsed by the Party of Communists	Registered
Irina Vlah	26 February 1974 (52); Comrat, Gagauzia	(website)	Governor of Gagauzia (2015–2023)	Independent	Registered
Ion Chicu	28 February 1972 (54); Pîrjolteni, Călărași		Prime Minister of Moldova (2019–2020); Minister of Finance (2018–2019)	Party of Development and Consolidation	Registered
Andrei Năstase	6 August 1975 (51); Mîndrești, Telenești	(website)	Deputy Prime Minister, Minister of Internal Affairs (2019)	Independent	Registered
Octavian Țîcu	21 August 1972 (54); Costuleni, Ungheni		Member of Parliament (2019–2021); Minister of Youth and Sport (2013)	Together	Registered
Victoria Furtună	24 February 1981 (45); Hîncești	(website)	Anti-corruption prosecutor	Independent	Registered
Tudor Ulianovschi	25 May 1983 (43); Florești	(website)	Minister of Foreign Affairs and European Integration (2018–2019); Ambassador to Switzerland and Liechtenstein (2016–2018); Permanent Representative to the United Nations (2016–2018)	Independent	Registered
Natalia Morari	12 January 1984 (42); Hîncești	(website)	Journalist; Host of Morari.live	Independent	Registered

=== Rejected candidates ===
The following people had their registration as candidates for the election rejected by the Central Electoral Commission:

- Igor Munteanu (Coalition for Unity and Welfare (Note: Munteanu, and the Coalition for Unity and Welfare, were a member of the bloc Together, and helped nominate and initially endorsed Octavian Țîcu; however, Munteanu and the party later left the bloc, citing numerous reasons.)), Ambassador to the United States, Canada and Mexico (2010–2015); he had previously gotten his initiative group registered, but the CEC invalidated some of the signatures in his support submitted by his party and he fell short of the minimum number required for his registration as a candidate.
- Vasile Bolea (independent), Member of the Moldovan Parliament (2014–present); the CEC rejected his registration as a candidate, arguing that he was backed by the bloc Victory and the party Revival despite having claimed to have disassociated himself from Revival to participate as an independent candidate. Revival is part of the bloc Victory, led by fugitive Moldovan oligarch Ilan Shor. The CEC did not allow Victory to participate in the election.
- Valeriu Pleșca (European Social Democratic Party), Minister of Defense (2004–2007)
- Valentin Borodachi (independent)
- Ludmila Corsun (independent)
- Avelin Tabarcea (independent)

Furthermore, Alexandru Arseni, whose initiative group supporting his candidacy had been successfully registered, did not submit the necessary documents for his inscription on the ballot of the election, having previously failed to obtain the required number of signatures in his support within the required time frame.

Ziarul de Gardă also listed Vlad Filat and Ștefan Savițchi among the people that intended to run as a candidate in the election who either failed to submit the necessary documents to the CEC or whose applications were rejected. Filat, former Moldovan prime minister and then president of the Liberal Democratic Party of Moldova (PLDM), stated that he was unable to run because the government failed to implement a 2023 ruling by the European Court of Human Rights (ECtHR) which determined that the authorities had violated his right to a fair trial in 2016 in relation to a passive corruption and influence peddling case because the court hearings were held behind closed doors. The PLDM had decided to nominate Filat for the election on 31 May. On the other hand, Savițchi was the vicepresident of the Alliance of Liberals and Democrats for Europe (ALDE) and announced on 30 July his intention to run as an independent candidate, later stating that he had "parted nicely" from the ALDE.

=== Declined ===
The following people were subjects of speculation about their potential candidacy within the previous months, but they rejected the speculation and announced they would not run as a candidate:

- Ion Ceban, Mayor of Chișinău (2019–present)
- Igor Dodon, President of Moldova (2016–2020)

== Opinion polls ==

=== Registered candidates ===
Fieldwork date	Polling firm/ Commissioner	Sample size												Undecided/ Abstention/ None/ Other
Fieldwork date	Polling firm/ Commissioner	Sample size	Sandu	Stoianoglo	Usatîi	Tarlev	Vlah	Chicu	Năstase	Țîcu	Furtună	Ulianovschi	Morari	Undecided/ Abstention/ None/ Other
Fieldwork date	Polling firm/ Commissioner	Sample size	Ind./PAS	Ind./PSRM	PN	PVM	Independent	PDCM	Independent	BÎ	Independent	Independent	Independent	Undecided/ Abstention/ None/ Other
11–16 Oct 2024	WatchDog	1,034	35.8%	9.0%	6.4%	1.3%	2.2%	1.2%	0.8%	0.4%	1.4%	0.1%	0.5%	40.9%
19 Sep–10 Oct 2024	iData–IPP	1,100	29.5%	11.6%	13.3%	6.1%	4.5%	3.4%	1.1%	1.3%	5.5%	4.3%	0.4%	18.9%
13–22 Sep 2024	ASPEN–APEC–WatchDog	1,021	36.1%	10.1%	7.5%	1.8%	4.1%	2.5%	0.6%	0.8%	0.5%	0.8%	0.6%	34.6%
13–18 Sep 2024	iData	1,021	26.8%	11.2%	12.7%	6.3%	6.1%	4.1%	0.9%	0.7%	0.1%	3.5%	1.8%	25.8%
30 Aug–2 Sep 2024	Intellect Group	596	24.5%	12.0%	6.2%	4.7%	5.0%	1.5%	3.5%	–	–	–	2.0%	40.6%
19–25 Aug 2024	iData	1,004	27.5%	11.4%	11.6%	5.8%	3.3%	2.8%	1.2%	–	–	–	–	36.4%
20–23 Aug 2024	CBS Research–WatchDog	1,011	35.5%	9.9%	6.8%	1.8%	5.8%	3.0%	1.2%	1.3%	0.3%	0.2%	0.2%	34.0%
8–21 Jul 2024	IMAS	1,093	33.7%	11.5%	10.8%	1.2%	8.9%	6.0%	1.4%	0.9%	–	0.1%	1.1%	24.4%

=== Second round ===
==== Sandu vs. Stoianoglo ====
Fieldwork date	Polling firm/ Commissioner	Sample size			None/ Undecided/ Abstention
Fieldwork date	Polling firm/ Commissioner	Sample size	Sandu	Stoianoglo	None/ Undecided/ Abstention
Fieldwork date	Polling firm/ Commissioner	Sample size	Ind./PAS	Ind./PSRM	None/ Undecided/ Abstention
19 Sep–10 Oct 2024	iData	1,100	40.6%	36.4%	23%

=== Hypothetical polling ===
Hypothetical polling for the 2024 Moldovan presidential election

==== Opinion polls before the start of the campaign ====
Fieldwork date	Polling firm/ Commissioner	Sample size											Other	None/ Undecided/ Abstention
Fieldwork date	Polling firm/ Commissioner	Sample size	Sandu	Dodon	Stoianoglo	Ceban	Shor	Voronin	Chicu	Tauber	Usatîi	Vlah	Other	None/ Undecided/ Abstention
Fieldwork date	Polling firm/ Commissioner	Sample size	Ind./PAS	PSRM	Ind./PSRM	MAN	ȘOR	PCRM	PDCM	ȘOR	PN	Independent	Other	None/ Undecided/ Abstention
28 Jun–18 Jul 2024	CBS-AXA-IPRE	1,119	30.3%	13.0%	1.0%	5.4%	2.5%	3.4%	3.2%	–	6.5%	5.6%	6.3%	23%
23 May–13 Jun 2024	IRI	1,225	34%	18%	–	4%	4%	–	5%	–	5%	4%	3%	24%
22–27 May 2024	iData	1,022	30.4%	14.3%	–	3.0%	–	2.5%	6.1%	–	3.9%	1.6%	6.1%	32.1%
2–19 May 2024	IMAS	1,088	35.2%	16.4%	–	5.9%	–	5.3%	5.7%	–	4.7%	4.1%	7.8%	14.9%
6–13 Apr 2024	CBS-AXA–WatchDog	1,008	35.1%	15.8%	–	5.4%	1.7%	4.6%	5.6%	–	3.9%	4.5%	5.3%	18.0%
18–24 Mar 2024	iData	1,131	27.9%	13.3%	–	4.4%	–	2.6%	5.7%	–	3.0%	4.3%	6.5%	32.3%
27 Jan–22 Feb 2024	IRI	1,247	30%	24%	–	6%	4%	–	5%	–	4%	4%	1%	22%
7–12 Feb 2024	CBS Research	1,104	29.8%	14.8%	–	4.5%	8.5%	1.6%	5.0%	–	4.4%	4.8%	4.1%	22.4%
26–30 Jan 2024	iData	1,011	24.1%	29.7%										46.2%
29 Nov–16 Dec 2023	IMAS	954	30.1%	24.0%	–	8.1%	–	2.7%	6.1%	–	4.1%	5.6%	6.0%	13.3%
2–24 Sep 2023	IMAS	822	27.8%	16.0%	–	6.0%	–	4.3%	5.9%	–	6.0%	4.9%	4.7%	24.4%
9–23 Aug 2023	CBS-AXA–IPP	1,215	29.4%	18.1%	–	5.6%	3.2%	1.5%	4.1%	–	5.1%	–	3.0%	30.1%
13–28 Jun 2023	CBS-AXA–IPRE	1,120	32.6%	17.8%	–	5.3%	3.3%	4.3%	2.9%	3.0%	4.3%	–	1.5%	24.0%
10–19 Jun 2023	CBS-AXA–WatchDog	1,121	37.9%	14.2%	–	6.2%	2.5%	4.7%	5.0%	3.5%	4.7%	–	3.0%	18.3%
2–19 May 2023	IMAS	1,112	28.5%	23.9%	–	8.3%	–	3.7%	7.2%	2.7%	3.8%	–	4.1%	18.0%
27 Apr–8 May 2023	iData	1,049	30.4%	18.3%	–	6.7%	12.2%	–	5.9%	–	4.5%	2.8%	1.5%	17.7%
4–13 Apr 2023	CBS-AXA–WatchDog	1,015	38.3%	18.4%	–	6.2%	2.5%	3.2%	4.9%	2.2%	3.2%	–	1.9%	19.2%
15–26 Mar 2023	iData	1,065	29.4%	17.6%	–	7.2%	9.2%	0.9%	5.4%	–	1.7%	3.1%	1.7%	23.9%
24 Feb–3 Mar 2023	CBS-AXA–WatchDog	1,000	31.8%	17.8%	–	4.7%	2.0%	3.5%	3.3%	1.8%	2.0%	2.1%	2.1%	28.8%
6–23 Feb 2023	IMAS	1,100	25.2%	20.4%	–	8.2%	–	4.9%	5.4%	4.3%	3.4%	–	3.8%	24.6%
17–26 Jan 2023	CBS-AXA–WatchDog	1,001	28.2%	17.6%	–	8.5%	4.2%	3.9%	3.9%	2.4%	3.5%	1.8%	4.0%	21.8%
15–26 Dec 2022	iData	1,006	27.2%	24.1%	–	10.0%	13.4%	0.6%	5.0%	0.2%	0.5%	0.1%	3.0%	16.0%
10–29 Nov 2022	IMAS	1,100	26.9%	19.6%	–	8.8%	–	4.0%	7.1%	2.8%	2.2%	–	7.3%	21.3%
29 Oct–10 Nov 2022	CBS Research/IPP	1,134	27.3%	15.4%	–	7.1%	9.1%	4.3%	–	–	2.9%	–	3.5%	30.5%
29 Sep–11 Oct 2022	IDIS–CBS Research–IPRI	1,066	34.1%	19.1%	–	7.1%	6.3%	5.2%	2.5%	–	3.3%	1.2%	3.2%	18.1%
6–18 Jul 2022	IMAS	1,007	24.4%	25.4%	–	9.2%	–	7.1%	5.2%	3.6%	2.8%	–	c. 5.4%	16.0%

==== Hypothetical second rounds ====
===== Sandu vs. Ceban =====
Fieldwork date	Polling firm/ Commissioner	Sample size			None/ Undecided/ Abstention
Fieldwork date	Polling firm/ Commissioner	Sample size	Sandu	Ceban	None/ Undecided/ Abstention
Fieldwork date	Polling firm/ Commissioner	Sample size	Ind./PAS	MAN	None/ Undecided/ Abstention
6–13 Apr 2024	CBS-AXA–WatchDog	1,008	40.2%	32.3%	27.4%
7–12 Feb 2024	CBS Research	1,104	39.5%	35%	25.8%
29 Nov–16 Dec 2023	IMAS	954	34%	42%	24%

===== Sandu vs. Chicu =====
Fieldwork date	Polling firm/ Commissioner	Sample size			None/ Undecided/ Abstention
Fieldwork date	Polling firm/ Commissioner	Sample size	Sandu	Chicu	None/ Undecided/ Abstention
Fieldwork date	Polling firm/ Commissioner	Sample size	Ind./PAS	PDCM	None/ Undecided/ Abstention
19 Sep–10 Oct 2024	iData	1,100	40.7%	30.1%	29.2%

===== Sandu vs. Dodon =====
Fieldwork date	Polling firm/ Commissioner	Sample size			None/ Undecided/ Abstention
Fieldwork date	Polling firm/ Commissioner	Sample size	Sandu	Dodon	None/ Undecided/ Abstention
Fieldwork date	Polling firm/ Commissioner	Sample size	Ind./PAS	PSRM	None/ Undecided/ Abstention
2–19 May 2024	IMAS	1,088	41.3%	43.5%	15.3%
6–13 Apr 2024	CBS-AXA–WatchDog	1,008	42.2%	34.9%	22.9%
7–12 Feb 2024	CBS Research	1,104	40.2%	39.3%	20.4%
29 Nov–16 Dec 2023	IMAS	954	35%	46%	19%
2–19 May 2023	IMAS	1,112	38%	45%	17%

===== Sandu vs. Usatîi =====
Fieldwork date	Polling firm/ Commissioner	Sample size			None/ Undecided/ Abstention
Fieldwork date	Polling firm/ Commissioner	Sample size	Sandu	Usatîi	None/ Undecided/ Abstention
Fieldwork date	Polling firm/ Commissioner	Sample size	Ind./PAS	PN	None/ Undecided/ Abstention
19 Sep–10 Oct 2024	iData	1,100	38.6%	35.6%	25.8%
13–18 Sep 2024	iData	1,021	35.1%	32.2%	32.7%
29 Nov–16 Dec 2023	IMAS	954	37%	30%	33%

===== Sandu vs. Vlah =====
Fieldwork date	Polling firm/ Commissioner	Sample size			None/ Undecided/ Abstention
Fieldwork date	Polling firm/ Commissioner	Sample size	Sandu	Vlah	None/ Undecided/ Abstention
Fieldwork date	Polling firm/ Commissioner	Sample size	Ind./PAS	Independent	None/ Undecided/ Abstention
19 Sep–10 Oct 2024	iData	1,100	40.2%	33.2%	26.6%
6–13 Apr 2024	CBS-AXA–WatchDog	1,008	43.2%	28.3%	28.5%
7–12 Feb 2024	CBS Research	1,104	42.2%	33%	24.7%
29 Nov–16 Dec 2023	IMAS	954	38%	35%	27%

== Endorsements ==
=== Party endorsements ===
The table below lists the political parties and other political organizations that supported any of the candidates in the first and second rounds of the presidential election.

Party/organization	Ideology	First round	Second round
Party of Action and Solidarity	Liberalism	Maia Sandu	Maia Sandu
Party of Socialists of the Republic of Moldova	Socialism	Alexandr Stoianoglo	Alexandr Stoianoglo
Common Action Party – Civil Congress	Socialist democracy	Alexandr Stoianoglo	Alexandr Stoianoglo
Our Party	Social conservatism	Renato Usatîi	No endorsement
Platform Moldova (Note: Political organization, not a party, led by Irina Vlah)	Left-wing populism	Irina Vlah	Against Sandu
Future of Moldova Party	Left-wing nationalism	Vasile Tarlev	Against Sandu
Party of Communists of the Republic of Moldova	Communism	Vasile Tarlev	Alexandr Stoianoglo
Party of Development and Consolidation	Christian democracy	Ion Chicu	Against Sandu
Dignity and Truth Platform (Note: Member party of the bloc Together)	Liberalism	Octavian Țîcu	Against Stoianoglo
Party of Change	Conservative liberalism	Octavian Țîcu	Against Stoianoglo
League of Cities and Communes	Localism	Octavian Țîcu	Maia Sandu
Victory (Note: Political bloc, not a party, led by Ilan Shor)	Russophilia	Against Sandu (Note: Allegedly supported Victoria Furtună)	Against Sandu
Alliance of Liberals and Democrats for Europe	Social liberalism	No candidate	Against Stoianoglo
Liberal Democratic Party of Moldova	Liberal conservatism	No candidate	Against Sandu
Ecologist Green Party	Green politics	No candidate	Maia Sandu
Liberal Party	Conservative liberalism	No candidate	Maia Sandu
Coalition for Unity and Welfare	Liberalism	No candidate	Participate without endorsement

=== Second round candidate endorsements ===
Candidate	First round	Endorsement
Renato Usatîi	13.79%	No endorsement
Irina Vlah	5.38%	Against Sandu
Victoria Furtună	4.45%	Alexandr Stoianoglo
Vasile Tarlev	3.19%	Against Sandu
Ion Chicu	2.06%	Against Sandu
Octavian Țîcu	0.93%	Against Stoianoglo
Andrei Năstase	0.64%	No endorsement
Natalia Morari	0.61%	Against Sandu
Tudor Ulianovschi	0.52%	No endorsement

== Results ==
=== First round ===
Incumbent president Maia Sandu and Alexandr Stoianoglo advanced to the runoff, with Sandu winning the first round with about 42.5 percent of votes. She did best in the central part of the country, winning 48.32% of the vote in Chișinău, her best result of 59.97% was in Ialoveni District. Sandu's strongest result was abroad, with 70.71% of the vote. In contrast, she recorded her worst results in the autonomy of Gagauzia and the Bulgarian-majority Taraclia District, at 2.26% and 4.44% of the vote, respectively. Meanwhile, Stoianoglo, a native of Gagauzia secured his best result there, with slightly less than 50% of the vote. In addition to Gagauzia, he also performed well in the north of the country, as well as Taraclia.

=== Second round ===
Incumbent president Maia Sandu defeated Alexandr Stoianoglo with about 55% of votes, compared to 45% of votes. Stoianoglo led the counting within Moldova, particularly among rural areas and in the south of the country and Transnistria, winning 51.2%. He recorded back-to-back landslide results in Gagauzia and Taraclia, winning more than 90% of the vote in each. However, Sandu led votes in Chișinău and other cities, among the youth and the Moldovan diaspora, where she won 83% of the vote. She secured her best result in Ialoveni District, which was also her strongest performance in the first round. Stoianoglo won seven subdivisions he lost in the first round: he secured Fălești District first won by Usatîi, as well as Sîngerei, Șoldănești, Dubăsari, Basarabeasca, Cahul districts and Botanica in Chișinău previously won by Sandu.

Candidate	Party	First round		Second round	
Candidate	Party	Votes	%	Votes	%
Maia Sandu	Independent (PAS)	656,852	42.49	930,139	55.35
Alexandr Stoianoglo	Independent (Party of Socialists)	401,215	25.95	750,430	44.65
Renato Usatîi	Our Party	213,169	13.79		
Irina Vlah	Independent	83,193	5.38		
Victoria Furtună	Independent	68,778	4.45		
Vasile Tarlev	Future of Moldova Party (Note: Endorsed by the Party of Communists)	49,316	3.19		
Ion Chicu	Party of Development and Consolidation	31,797	2.06		
Octavian Țîcu	Together	14,326	0.93		
Andrei Năstase	Independent	9,946	0.64		
Natalia Morari	Independent	9,444	0.61		
Tudor Ulianovschi	Independent	7,995	0.52		
Total		1,546,031	100.00	1,680,569	100.00
Valid votes		1,546,031	98.82	1,680,569	98.78
Invalid/blank votes		18,464	1.18	20,715	1.22
Total votes		1,564,495	100.00	1,701,284	100.00
Registered voters/turnout		3,023,506	51.74	3,133,687	54.29
Source: Central Electoral Commission

Vote share
Second round
Sandu	55.35%
Stoianoglo	44.65%
First round
Sandu	42.49%
Stoianoglo	25.95%
Usatîi	13.79%
Vlah	5.38%
Furtună	4.45%
Tarlev	3.19%
Chicu	2.06%
Others	2.70%

Sandu's results by district, first round

Sandu's results by district, second round

Stoianoglo's results by district, first round

== Aftermath ==
=== First round ===
President Sandu attributed the result of the first round and the referendum to foreign interference and described it as an "unprecedented assault on democracy", adding that her government had evidence that 150,000 votes had been bought, with an objective of 300,000. The European Union also said that the two exercises had taken place "under unprecedented interference and intimidation by Russia and its proxies". The United States also noted Russian attempts to "undermine Moldova's election and its European integration". The Kremlin, in response, had denounced the votes in Moldova as "unfree", casting doubt on what it said was a "hard-to-explain" increase in votes in favor of Sandu and the EU referendum, and challenged her to "present evidence" of meddling.

==== Instances of vote buying ====
Four hundred Moldovan citizens were investigated for allegedly receiving money to choose the "no" option in the referendum and vote for a determined candidate in the presidential election. Those found guilty would have been fined 37,000 Moldovan lei (over 1,900 euros), but were given the option of not receiving punishment if they cooperated with the authorities.

The head of the Moldovan Police, Viorel Cernăuțeanu, stated on 24 October that since September, a total of $39 million, including 15 million that month and 24 million in October, had been transferred to over 138,000 people in Moldova through the Russian bank Promsvyazbank, which is banned in Moldova. He added that the number of people that had benefited from this system would be much greater as they would have received money not only for themselves but also for members of their family. This money transfer system was believed to have started in late spring, and was carried out through applications that people downloaded with instructions from interactive chatbots on Telegram. This allowed them to enter the system and benefit from transfers from the bank. Cernăuțeanu stated that Moldovan police had documented and stopped the activity of such bots in 97 Telegram groups.

A later national poll showed that 74.7% of respondents knew people who had received benefits, material or financial, for their vote. The poll had 1,031 respondents and was conducted by the Moldova State University's Centre of Political and Administrative Studies in partnership with the Black Sea Trust for Regional Cooperation.

==== International reactions ====
The OSCE election observation mission wrote that the voting process was received "overwhelmingly positively" by its observers. According to the report, "the election administration worked professionally and demonstrated impartiality in their decision-making", while "fundamental freedoms were generally respected and contestants could campaign freely". Regarding media landscape, the report stated that "the majority of ODIHR EOM interlocutors informed that conditions for media work without interference have improved", however it also noted misuse of administrative resources by Sandu's campaign and concluded that media coverage did not provide fully equal opportunities, with several media organizations, most notably the public broadcaster Teleradio-Moldova, favouring Sandu and the government. The Electoral Commission also did not resolve complaints in timely manner, and failed to properly address allegations of misuse of office by the incumbent. The report also acknowledged concerns over illicit foreign interference and disinformation campaigns.

==== Domestic reactions ====
In a statement on 24 October, Sandu stated that, despite the instances of vote buying, she had rejected suggestions of annulling and repeating the elections as "no one has the right to deny citizens a massive, honest and free expression of their will". She further stated that, without the buying of votes, "we would have had a clear victory for both the presidential elections and the referendum", and also urged the Moldovan judiciary to "wake up" and address the issue of electoral bribery. Former Moldovan Defence Minister Anatol Salaru said ahead of the run-off, that the result would decide whether Moldova would "continue the process of European integration or return to the Russia fold".

=== Second round ===
Sandu declared in her victory speech; "Moldova, you are victorious! Today, dear Moldovans, you have given a lesson in democracy, worthy of being written in history books. Today, you have saved Moldova". She went on to announce that the election had faced an unprecedented attack through alleged schemes including dirty money, vote-buying, and electoral interference "by hostile forces from outside the country" and criminal groups. She pledged to be a "president for all" and concluded: "You have shown that nothing can stand in the way of the people's power when they choose to speak through their vote". Her speech was delivered in Romanian and partly in Russian.

Speaking before the final vote count, Stoianoglo told the media that "everyone's voice deserves respect" and that he hopes "from now on, we will put an end to the hatred and division imposed on us." The Party of Socialists alleged that voting was marred by irregularities and the reduction of polling stations available for Moldovans living in Russia. It also called Sandu an "illegitimate president". PSRM leader Igor Dodon also called Sandu "a president of the diaspora", citing her strong showing among overseas voters. Stoianoglo formally conceded on 6 November, while noting that he had led in the counting within Moldova and describing his loss as "not a final defeat, it is only a lost battle".

==== International reactions ====
- Romania: Prime Minister Marcel Ciolacu congratulated Maia Sandu and said Moldovans chose to defend their democracy and continue their pro-European Union path. He declared that Moldovans "reconfirmed in front of the whole world not only their courage, but also their full confidence in their European future!" despite Russian attempts at vote-buying.
- European Union: EU foreign policy chief Josep Borrell and EU Commission President Ursula von der Leyen congratulated Sandu, with Von der Leyen saying that "it takes a rare kind of strength to overcome the challenges you've faced in this election.
- France: President Emmanuel Macron praised the result, saying that democracy had "triumphed over all interference and all maneuvers".
- Germany: Chancellor Olaf Scholz praised Sandu for having "steered her country towards Europe," while denouncing what it described as "a large-scale, coordinated effort" to obstruct Moldovans abroad from voting, including through bomb threats, labeling the intimidation as "completely unacceptable."
- United States: President Joe Biden congratulated Maia Sandu on her reelection, praising the Moldovan people for supporting her vision of a "secure, prosperous, and democratic Moldova." He noted that Sandu's victory came just weeks after a constitutional referendum endorsing Moldova's membership in the European Union. Biden condemned Russia’s attempts to "undermine Moldova’s democratic institutions and election processes," noting that these efforts had failed. He lauded the Moldovan people for exercising their democratic right to "choose their own future," opting for an alignement with Europe and democracies worldwide.
- Ukraine: President Volodymyr Zelenskyy congratulated Sandu for her victory and emphasised the need for "a peaceful, united Europe".
- Russia: Kremlin spokesperson Dmitry Peskov described the election as "neither democratic nor fair" and refused to recognise Sandu as president, saying that overseas Moldovan voters in Russia were disenfranchised as only two polling stations supplied with 10,000 ballots were open in Russia, home to a Moldovan diaspora numbering in hundreds of thousands. The Russian foreign ministry accused the West of "blatant interference" in the election and Moldovan authorities of "unprecedented repression against the opposition".
