= Death of Ludmila Vartic =

2026 suicide in Moldova

On 3 March 2026, Ludmila Vartic, a 38-year-old kindergarten teacher, was found dead at the base of an apartment block in Poșta Veche, in Chișinău, Moldova. It was subsequently determined that she had died after jumping from the 11th floor, with the police ruling her death to be a suicide. In the days following Vartic's death, friends and family members shared that Vartic had suffered significant domestic abuse from her husband, Dumitru Vartic, a local politician in Hîncești. This caused a public outcry throughout Moldova, resulting in Vartic's husband resigning and being investigated for his role in his her death, and a wider debate about Moldovan authorities' responses to reports of domestic abuse.

== Personal life ==
At the time of her death, Vartic was 38 and worked at Andrieș, a kindergarten in Hîncești. She was married to Dumitru Vartic, a member of the Party of Action and Solidarity who served as deputy head of the Hîncești District's local government. Following a suicide attempt in November 2025 when Vartic took an overdose of ten different medications, she had moved out of the family home in Hîncești to live with her mother and sister in an apartment block in Poșta Veche, a neighbourhood in the Rîșcani sector of Chișinău, 33 kilometres from Hîncești.

== Death ==
On 3 March 2026, Vartic's body was found at the base of an apartment block in Poșta Veche, where it was reported that she had jumped from the 11th floor. It was reported that Vartic's children had been with their father at the time of her death.

== Investigation ==
The investigation into Vartic's death was started by the local police department in Hîncești, though by 17 March it transferred to the Rîșcani Police Inspectorate. It was subsequently confirmed that Vartic's death had been caused by trauma caused simultaneously to several organs, as well as multiple bone fractures, specific to a fall from a height. The medical examiner ruled that there was no evidence that Vartic had any injuries to her caused by violence prior to the fall, and also challenged media reports that claimed that Vartic had already been dead at the time she fell, stating that this "could not be established". It ruled her death to be a suicide. The police clarified that photographs of Vartic's body that went viral on social media had been taken by a tenant of the apartment block and were not part of the official investigation; the tenant, who admitted to taking the photos and sharing them with friends, subsequently had their phone seized by police.

The Hîncești police department had initially opened an investigation into Vartic's death; after reports around domestic abuse began to be reported in the Moldovan media, it subsequently announced that a second investigation had been opened into the family's situation. These two investigations were amalgamated into one after the case transferred to the Rîșcani Police Inspectorate. A police spokesperson confirmed that there had been no police reports made of domestic abuse between 2019 and Vartic's death in 2026.

After Vartic's husband shared a photo on social media of what he alleged was a letter written by Vartic on the day of her death, the Rîșcani Police Inspectorate clarified that the letter had been written prior to Vartic's death. It confirmed that a separate letter had been found that was purportedly written by Vartic immediately prior to her death, though Daniella Misail-Nichitin, the Minister of Internal Affairs, stated that the letter would not be released publicly due to its "sensitive" subject matter, and out of respect for Vartic's children.

== Response ==
The Moldovan media began to report more on Vartic's death after members of her family published a post on social media on 7 March 2026 alleging that she had been subjected to verbal and physical abuse from her husband for several years prior to her death, in addition to him bringing other women to the home. Human rights groups raised concerns that Vartic had been incited to die by suicide as a result of domestic abuse. On 8 March, a moment of silence was held for Vartic at the Summer Theatre in Hîncești City Park.

Vartic's husband denied responsibility for her death, in addition to allegations of domestic abuse, stating that she had experienced "serious health issues and depressive episodes" prior to her death in a video posted on Facebook. He later resigned as deputy head of Hîncești District Council and was expelled as a member of the Party of Action and Solidarity. Doina Gherman, the Vice President of the Moldovan Parliament and a member of the same party, had previously called on Vartic's husband to step down, and had called on the National Agency for the Prevention and Combating of Violence Against Women to take action. She also referenced Vartic's death while speaking at the 70th Session of the United Nations Commission on the Status of Women. Hîncești District Council described Vartic as a "special, dedicated person, with a distinguished character and a valuable contribution to the community". It also stated that its president, Nicoletta Moroșanu, had called on Vartic's husband to resign.

Moldovan media reported that Vartic had previously been hospitalised for two days from 5 November 2025, after taking an overdose of five different types of medication. Emil Ceban, the Minister of Health, announced an investigation into the actions of staff at Hîncești District Hospital following Vartic's admission. Alexandru Botnari, the mayor of Hîncești, expressed concern about an alleged incident where Vartic's husband was reported to have contacted a doctor to request that they conceal information about Vartic's admission. On 18 March 2026, Ceban announced that the director of Hîncești District Hospital, Petru Ciubotaru, had resigned voluntarily after acknowledging that staff had not followed guidelines stipulating that any attempted suicides should be reported to the police.

On 21 March 2026, a flash mob was held in Vartic's memory. A petition demanding justice, truth and transparency was signed by over 8000 people.

The National Coalition of Life Against Violence released a statement stating that Vartic's death was caused by "continuous abuse, humiliation and control", denoting it as a femicide. The National Agency for the Prevention and Combating of Violence against Women confirmed that it had sent formal requests to several state institutions to understand how authorities had intervened in the case. The Women's Law Centre called for Moldova to establish femicide as a distinct crime in the country's criminal code.
