= Natalia Morari =

Moldovan journalist

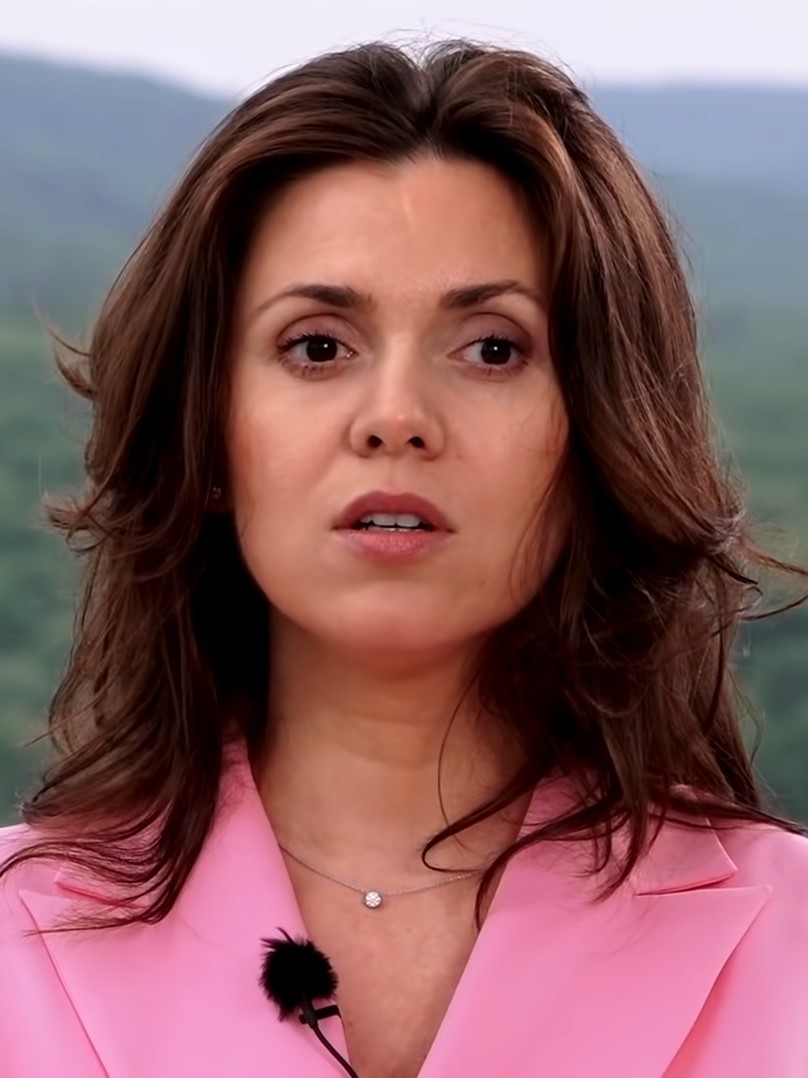
- Morari in 2021
- Born: 12 January 1984 (age 42); Kotovsk, Moldavian SSR, Soviet Union
- Education: Moscow State University
- Occupation: Journalist
- Years active: 2010s–present
- Children: 1

Natalia Morari (Russian: Наталья Григорьевна Морарь, romanized: Natal'ia Grigor'evna Morar'; born 12 January 1984) is a Moldovan journalist, known for her investigative work and political talk shows.

== Biography ==
Morari was born in Kotovsk, Moldavian Soviet Socialist Republic, Soviet Union (now Hîncești, Moldova) on January 12, 1984, to Grigore Morari and Raisa Guțu. She graduated from Gaudeamus Theoretical High School in Chișinău and continued her studies from 2002 to 2007 at Moscow State University, where she was awarded two scholarships. During her studies, she began her journalism career at the Russian publication "Novoe Vremya" (The New Times).

== Expulsion from Russia ==
During her activity as a journalist at Novoe Vremya, Morari, having Moldovan citizenship, was expelled from Russia due to her journalistic investigations, which troubled the Kremlin leadership.

Morari wrote about money laundering cases involving high-ranking officials in President Vladimir Putin's entourage. On 10 December 2007 she published an article titled "The Kremlin's Black Money," detailing the illegal use of funds to keep all significant parties in Russia dependent on the authorities. On December 16, upon her return from a week-long trip to Israel, she was denied entry into Russia at Domodedovo Airport based on an FSB decision. This incident prompted a protest from the Russian Journalists' Union. Consequently, Morari had to fly to Chișinău. She had applied for Russian citizenship immediately after graduating from Moscow State University and was supposed to receive it in April 2008.

On 17 January 2008, at the Russian Embassy in the Republic of Moldova, Morari was informed that she was banned from entering Russia for "state security reasons" in accordance with point 1, article 27 of the federal law "on entry and exit from the Russian Federation.”

In March 2008, Morari filed a complaint with the Moldovan police, claiming she had received death threats by phone. On 21 August 2008 she was denied Russian citizenship on the grounds of "calls for the overthrow of the constitutional order of the Russian Federation by force and threat to national security.” In August 2008, the radio station Echo of Moscow reported that Morari had sued the Russian state at the European Court of Human Rights for banning her entry.

The entry ban was lifted in March 2012, only after Yevgenia Albats, along with other chief editors Dmitry Muratov (Novaya Gazeta) and Alexei Venediktov (Echo of Moscow), personally requested President Dmitry Medvedev to intervene.

== Civic and political activism ==
From 2008 to 2009, Morari led the association "Think Moldova". She, along with other young activists, was one of the main organizers of the April 2009 protests in Chișinău following the parliamentary elections. The protests were driven by youth dissatisfaction with the election results, which saw the Communist Party of the Republic of Moldova (PCRM) gain a majority. The April 7 protests eventually escalated into mass riots.

Following the protests, Morari was arrested, placed under house arrest, and subsequently banned from leaving the country for five months. After the early parliamentary elections in July 2009, which resulted in a pro-European governing coalition, the new Attorney General dropped all charges against her related to organizing the mass riots.

On 6 October 2015 Morari addressed an open letter to Vladimir Plahotniuc, Vlad Filat, and Mihai Ghimpu, in which she said that with them in power, "the country ended up being governed the worst in the last 24 years" and urges them to leave the country. In 2016, Morari addressed a second open letter, but only in the name of Plahotniuc, accusing him of being the primary threat to the people. "You will never again become the one you wanted to become all along—the legitimate ruler of Moldova. From the shadows, yes. Secretly, yes. Legitimate—never", wrote Morari at that time.

From 2018 to 2019, Morari was ambassador for the "Stop False!" (ro: Stop Fals!) campaign organized by the Independent Press Association (API), which aimed to combat misinformation and manipulation in the media. As part of this campaign, she informed citizens about disinformation and political manipulation techniques in 30 cities across the country.

On 18 July 2024, Morari announced her candidacy for President of the Republic of Moldova as an independent candidate. In the first round of the presidential elections, held on 20 October 2024, she obtained 0.61% of the votes.

== Journalistic career ==
After her expulsion from Russia, Morari joined the television team Publika TV. From 2010 to 2013, she moderated the political analysis show "Fabrika" on Publika TV. In 2013, she launched her own show, "Politica," on the TV7 channel, which gained significant viewership. Since March 2015, she has moderated the political interview format show "INTERPOL" on TV7. Additionally, Morari was the author and moderator of the show "Candidat," simulating local and presidential elections from 2016 to 2019.

In June 2017, Morari launched TV8, a television station based on the former TV7 and the Alternative Public Media Association, where she is the founder and chair of the Board of Directors. This project was unprecedented for Moldova, creating a free television concept funded by external donors. At TV8, Morari moderated her show "Politica Nataliei Morari,"which aired until September 2021.

== Awards and nominations ==
In 2014, Morari was named TV Journalist of the Year at the 20th edition of the "Journalists of the Year—2014" Gala organized by the Independent Journalism Center. In 2018, she received the "Pavel Sheremet" International Award for her efforts in developing TV8. The award was presented at the Eastern Partnership Civil Society Forum in Tbilisi, Georgia. In July 2020, Morari won the "Stories of Injustice" award from the Prague-based organization People in Need for promoting democratic values.

During her time moderating the shows "Politica" and "INTERPOL" on TV7, Morari was awarded in the "Interview" category at the 21st Annual Press Club Gala in Chișinău, organized by the Independent Journalism Center and the Press Freedom Committee on 17 December 2015.

== Personal life ==
In 2011, Morari married her then-colleague from The New Times, Russian journalist Ilia Barabanov; they later divorced in 2019. She had a relationship with politician and entrepreneur Chiril Lucinschi, founder of TV7 (now TV8), where Morari worked at that time.
