= Aneta Grosu =

Aneta Grosu OR
- Born: 24 September 1957 (age 68); Drochia, Moldavian SSR, Soviet Union
- Occupation: Journalist
- Awards: Order of the Republic (Moldova)

Aneta Grosu (born 24 September 1957) is a journalist from the Republic of Moldova. She is the editor in chief of the investigative newspaper Ziarul de Gardă since its appearance. She is a leader of the Democratic Forum of Romanians in Moldova.

== Biography ==
In 1979, she graduated from the State University of Moldova, the Faculty of Philology, the journalistic section, being a disciple of the professors T. Colac, S. Nucă, E. Ciornîi and others.

After graduating from the faculty, she started her journalistic activity at the "Actualities" section of the Moldovan State Television (TVM, now Teleradio Moldova), where she worked for over 15 years. From 1994 to 1996, she was at the “Catalan” television studio. In 1996, the FLUX press group employed her as a reporter. From both televisions, she was dismissed for political reasons: in 1994, from TVM in 1994 shortly after the parliamentary victory of the Democratic Agrarian Party and in 1996, from Catalan TV, again within the elections.

In 1993, Aneta had a professional course at the Television of Orlando, Florida, USA. Two years later, she participated in the International Conflict Meeting in Nitra, Slovakia, and in 1997, attended the symposium "Media in the Presidential Election" in Bucharest.

She is the winner of the first International Festival of Independent Television Studios (Košice, Slovakia) and the first International Journalism Festival in Yalta. In 1996, she participated in the "Media Fest" Festival in Costinesti, România. In 2009, along with a number of other journalists, she was awarded the Order of the Republic "in a sign of high appreciation of the special merits in asserting the freedom of expression, for substantial contribution to the process of national rebirth and promotion of democracy and general human values". In 2014, decorated by Romanian President Traian Basescu with the National Order "For Merit" as Officer Degree.

Since 1983, she is a member of the Moldova Union of Journalists. He was chairperson of the Independent Journalists Association "V.I.P.". In 2004, along with Alina Radu, set up "Ziarul de Gardă" investigative weekly publication. Currently, she is the editor and editor-in-chief of this publication.

== Awards and honors ==
- Order of the Republic (Moldova) - highest state distinctions (2009)
