= Alina Radu =

Moldovan journalist (born 1967)

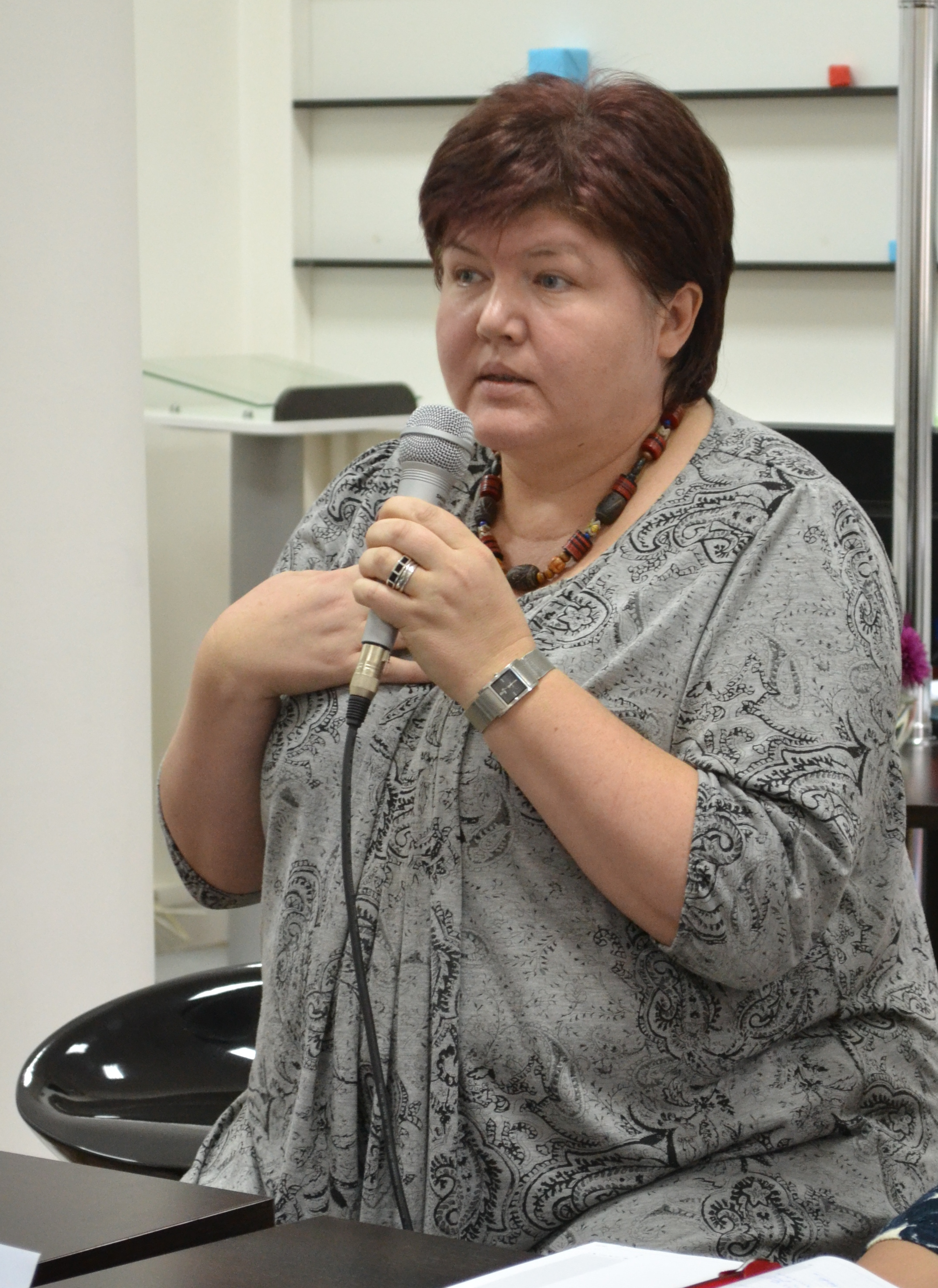
- Radu in 2010
- Born: 24 August 1967 (age 58); Chișinău, Moldavian SSR, Soviet Union
- Occupation: Journalist

Alina Radu (born 24 August 1967) is a Moldovan journalist. She is the director and co-founder of the newspaper Ziarul de Gardă.

== Biography ==
Radu studied at the Faculty of Journalism and Communication Sciences, Moldova State University. She has two children.

== Career ==
Radu received her first experience in journalism in 1989 on the TVM news show "Mesager". Since 1994, she has been working at Catalan TV, since 1998 he has been a reporter at GP FLUX, and since 2002, she has been collaborating at IDIS "Viitorul". In 2004, Radu founded "Ziarul de Gardă" alongside Aneta Grosu where she also became director. In addition to written journalism, she collaborates in the production of documentaries, such as În așteptare, Doctor SIDA acuză, Duși de vânt, and Ilie.

Radu was awarded the Grand Prix at the TV Festival in Košice, Slovakia (1997) and the II prize at the TV Festival in Timișoara, Romania. She received the title of journalist of the year in Moldova in 2005, according to the celebrity magazine VIP Magazin. Also in 2005, she was nominated for the Nobel Peace Prize; that year, two more women from Moldova were nominated for the Nobel Prize. In 2009, she was named one of the "Ten Journalists of the Year" by the Center for Independent Journalism. In 2013, IDIS "Viitorul" awarded Radu the "Freedom Award", "for courage, vision and integrity in the effort to bring the truth to people's homes".
