= Poșta Veche, Chișinău =

Neighborhood in Chișinău, Moldova

Poșta Veche is a neighborhood in the Rîșcani sector of Chișinău, the capital of the Republic of Moldova. The main routes in the area are Calea Orheiului Street and Ceucari Street. The northwestern edge of the quarter, which also marks the urban boundary of Chișinău, is defined by the M21 highway.

== History ==
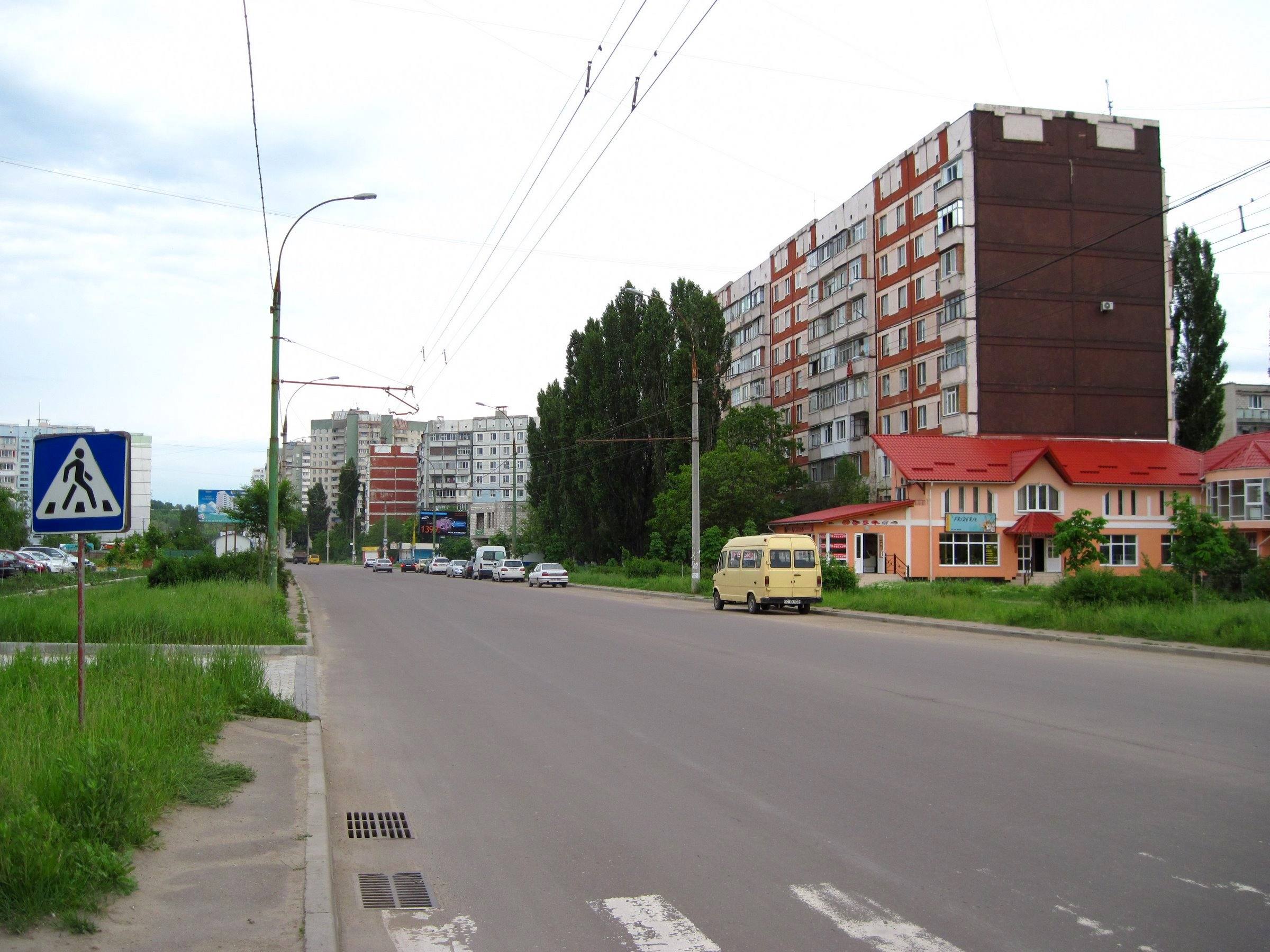
Ceucari, an arterial road in Poșta Veche

The quarter of Poșta Veche was founded on the site of a village of the same name in the early 19th century. It was named after an old post office located on the outskirts of Chișinău, near Orhei. By 1912, the village had approximately 150 households with a population of around 600 residents. The area was incorporated into the city of Chișinău in the 1920s. Historically, the neighborhood was largely inhabited by peasants, as well as railway workers, craftsmen, and merchants. In some areas, the quarter has retained its old character, with narrow streets, small houses with plots of land, and fences made of wood or stone.

Poșta Veche became more widely known in 2026 following the death of Ludmila Vartic, a kindergarten teacher who jumped to her death from one of the neighbourhood's tower blocks after experiencing years of domestic abuse.
