= Veronica Dragalin =

Moldovan lawyer (born 1985)

Chief of the Anticorruption Prosecutor's Office of Moldova
- In office 1 August 2022 – 4 March 2025
- Preceded by: Interim leadership
- Succeeded by: (position restructured)

Personal details
- Born: 1985 (age 40–41) Moldavian SSR, Soviet Union (now Moldova)
- Citizenship: Moldovan, American
- Education: Duke University (BS); University of Virginia School of Law (JD)
- Occupation: Prosecutor, lawyer

Veronica Dragalin (also Drăgălin; born in 1985) is a Moldovan lawyer. Born in Moldova and raised in Moldova and the United States, of which she is a citizen, she worked as a prosecutor in Los Angeles before returning to Moldova in 2022 to serve as the head of the Anti-Corruption Prosecutor's Office (PA). Dragalin resigned in 2025 following the Moldovan government's proposal to merge her role into the new Prosecutor's Office for Anti-Corruption and Combating Organized Crime (PACCO), a decision she claimed was politically motivated.

Prior to her appointment in Moldova, Dragalin served as an Assistant United States Attorney in the Central District of California, where she prosecuted public corruption and civil rights cases. She later became the first woman to lead Moldova’s Anti-Corruption Prosecutor’s Office.

== Early life and education ==
Dragalin was born in 1985, in what was then the Moldavian Soviet Socialist Republic and now Moldova, to mathematician parents. At the age of seven, Dragalin and her family left the newly-independent Moldova, moving first to Italy and later Germany before settling in the United States, subsequently gaining citizenship. Dragalin's mother, Elena, went on to establish the non-governmental organisations Moldova AID and the Moldovan-American Convention. Dragalin graduated with a bachelor's degree in biology, chemistry and biochemistry from Duke University before obtaining her Juris Doctor degree in law from the University of Virginia.

== Career ==
=== Prosecutorial career (2011–2022) ===
In 2011, Dragalin began working as an associate at Jones Day, a multinational law firm. In 2016, she became an assistant attorney in Los Angeles, California, where she worked in the public corruption and civil rights section, and served as hate crimes coordinator.

=== Anti-Corruption Prosecutor's Office (2022–2025) ===
Dragalin returned to Moldova after becoming head of the Anti-Corruption Prosecutor's Office (PA); her appointment was supported by Maia Sandu, the President of Moldova, and Sergiu Litvinenco, the Minister of Justice. Dragalin's mandate began on 1 August 2022.

During the first six months of Dragalin's tenure, Moldova's standing in the 2022 Corruption Perceptions Index by Transparency International increased by three points. She introduced plea agreements to the Moldovan legal system, and in 2024, led an investigation with Interpol into five individuals suspected of paying intermediaries to notify criminals of their Red Notice status, and paying bribes to block and delete notices to enable criminals to claim refuge and asylum in Moldova.

Dragalin's relationship with Sandu, Litvinenco and the ruling Party of Action and Solidarity (PAS) became more strained as her tenure progressed, with senior members of the party criticising Dragalin over a perceived lack of results addressing the issue of corruption. Following the 2024 presidential election and constitutional referendum, Sandu said that the Anti-Corruption Prosecutor's Office had failed to prevent "electoral and political corruption", including vote buying by oligarch Ilan Shor. In response, Dragalin accused the government of pressuring prosecutors into not investigating top officials for corruption.

In February 2025, 29 members of the Moldovan government introduced a bill to parliament that proposed merging the Anti-Corruption Prosecutor's Office and the Prosecutor's Office for Combating Organised Crime and Special Cases (PCCOCS) into a new structure, to be called the Prosecutor's Office for Anti-Corruption and Combating Organized Crime (PACCO), following concerns of vote buying in the previous year's elections. Dragalin was highly critical of the proposals, warning that it would lead to an increase in corruption and weaken prosecutors' abilities to investigate politicians; she described it as an "obvious" attempt to force her to resign her position. On 19 February, Dragalin announced her resignation; in a statement, she described the draft law as an "attack on the justice system" that compromised the independence of the judiciary and weakened prosecutors' ability to hold people in power to account. She added that "the fight for integrity, accountability and transparency must continue". Dragalin's mandate ended on 4 March 2025.

=== Subsequent events (2025–present) ===
In July 2025, the Superior Council of Prosecutors accepted the recommendations of the Vetting Commission that Dragalin be barred from holding public office, including as a prosecutor, for a period of five years, after she failed external assessments of her ethical and financial integrity after resigning during the evaluation process. Dragalin had requested that the Superior Council reject the commission's report, stating she had provided the required documents in time, but had taken more than 20 days to provide additional information requested, which she called a "simple administrative delay" due to "personal reasons". Dragalin stated her intention to challenge the decision before the European Court of Human Rights (ECtHR).

In September 2025, it was announced that Dragalin had returned to the United States to work for Jones Day's Investigations and White Collar Defence Practice in Washington, D.C..

In February 2026, the Superior Council of Prosecutors ruled that Dragalin had committed a "disciplinary offence" by distributing "defamatory information" about Tatiana Răducanu, a member of the Pre-vetting and Vetting Commission; no sanctions were made against Dragalin due to her no longer working in Moldova. Răducanu had accused Dragalin of orchestrating a smear campaign against her after Dragalin wrote to magistrates expressing concern that Răducanu was associated with known criminals including Veaceslav Platon and Ilan Shor, citing information seized from Shor's lawyer, Aureliu Corenco. Răducanu subsequently resigned from the commission.

== Recognition ==
While working in the United States, Dragalin received the ATF Case Recognition Award in 2019 and FBI Director's Award in 2020.

In 2023, Dragalin received the Robert S. Tucker Prize for Prosecutorial Excellence from the Elisabeth Haub School of Law at Pace University, in recognition of her "outstanding contributions to the field of criminal prosecution and excellence in prosecutorial practice".
