= Grătiești =

- Commune
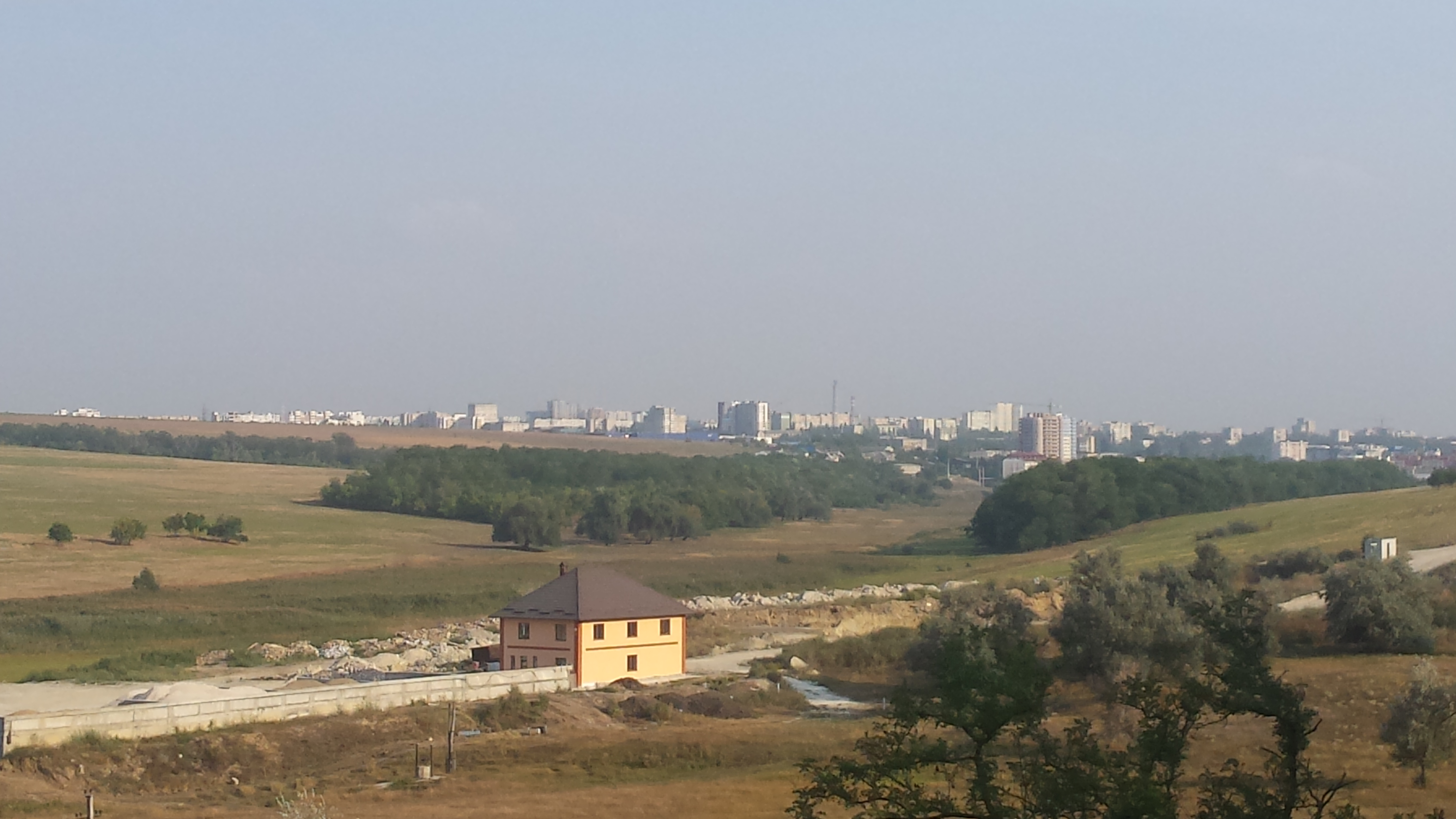
- Interactive map of Grătiești
- Country: Moldova
- District: Chișinău

Government
  - Mayor: Olga Caraman (PPDA)

Area
  - Total: 1.62 km^{2} (0.63 sq mi)

Population (2024)
  - Total: 7,299
- Time zone: UTC+2 (EET)
  - Summer (DST): UTC+3 (EEST)
- Postal code: MD-2093
- Website: https://www.gratiesti.com

Grătiești is a commune in Sectorul Rîșcani of Chișinău municipality, Moldova. It is composed of two villages, Grătiești and Hulboaca.

== Demographics ==
According to the 2024 census, 7,299 inhabitants lived in the commune of Grătiești, an increase compared to the previous census in 2014, when 6,183 inhabitants were registered.

Ethnic composition of Grătiești (2024)
1. Moldovans (Note: There is an ongoing controversy regarding the ethnic identification of Moldovans and Romanians.) (81.8%)
2. Romanians (16.1%)
3. Others (2.00%)
Linguistic composition of Grătiești (2024)
1. Romanian (59.6%)
2. Moldovan (Note: In March 2023, the Parliament of Moldova passed a law updating all legislative texts and the constitution to refer to the national language as Romanian, effectively rendering the term "Moldovan" obsolete.) (36.7%)
3. Russian (2.80%)
4. Other (0.90%)

Historical population
| Year | Pop. | ±% |
|---|---|---|
| 2004 | 6,242 | — |
| 2014 | 6,183 | −0.9% |
| 2024 | 7,299 | +18.0% |
