= Ziarul de Gardă =

Newspaper published in Moldova

- Type: Weekly newspaper
- Founded: 29 July 2004
- Language: Romanian, Russian
- Headquarters: Chișinău, Moldova
- Website: www.zdg.md

Ziarul de Gardă is an independent weekly newspaper in the Republic of Moldova, founded by Alina Mazureac and Aneta Grosu on 29 July 2004, as a press edition dedicated to investigative journalism, which publishes articles exposing acts of corruption and human rights violations. The newsroom produces a weekly print edition in Romanian, another print edition in Russian, web pages in both languages, radio and television shows such as TV Reporter de Gardă, and social media content.

The Romanian-language edition appears weekly every Thursday and has 24 pages in colour and black and white. Circulation in 2018 was more than 330,000 copies, or about 6,000 per week. The Russian-language print edition, launched in 2015, appears weekly every Friday, with a 12-page color and black-and-white volume. It had a circulation of over 70,000 copies in 2018 (approximately 1,300 per week).

Currently, the director is Alina Radu.

== Awards ==
"Ziarul de Gardă" and its collaborators were awarded several prizes:

- First prize, "Newspapers" category, offered by UNDP Moldova - Irina Codrean (2006)
- "Drivers of Change" Award by "Free Press Unlimited" (2013)
- Freedom Award, offered by the Institute for Development and Social Initiatives IDIS "Viitorul" - Alina Radu (2013)
- First Prize and Trophy of the Local Production Section for the best work – Alina Radu, ELITOCID LA PANTA DE SUS (2015)

Awards offered by the Independent Press Association :

- First Prize "Best Reporter" - Olga Bulat (2013)
- First Prize "The best journalistic investigation" - Iurie Sanduța (2013)
- First prize "Newspaper with the best design" (2013)
- First Prize "The best journalistic investigation" - Victor Moșneag (2014)
- First Prize "Best Web Page" [ 17 ]

Awards offered at the "10 journalists of the year". The following recipients:

- Print media - Aneta Grosu (2014)
- The beginning of the year - the economic weekly "ECO" (2005)
- The written press – Aneta Grosu (2006)
- Hope of the Year – Anastasia Nani (2007)
- The written press – Aneta Grosu (2009)
- Print media – Tatiana Ețco (2010)
- The written press – Victor Moșneag (2012)
- The written press – Iurie Sănduță (2013)
- Responsible journalism and reporting system problems – Alina Radu (2017)
- TV/Radio Show – Marina Ciobanu, Viorica Tătaru (2018)
