= Viorica Tătaru =

Moldovan journalist

Viorica Tătaru is a Moldovan journalist for the nonprofit television network TV8. She is known for her reporting on the experiences of people living in Transnistria, a breakaway state internationally recognised as part of Moldova, in the television series Dincolo de Nistru.

== Career ==
Tătaru works as a journalist for TV8 as part of its news broadcasting service, and is based in Chișinău. Alongside cameraman Andrei Captarenco, Tătaru produces and hosts the television news programme Dincolo de Nistru (lit. 'Beyond the Dniester'), which reported on the experiences of people living in Transnistria in the decades following the Transnistrian War between 1990 and 1992.

== Harassment ==
In 2022, a man made threats to seriously harm and kill Tătaru online. Tătaru reported the threats to the police, though the individual was not arrested until 2025 after he initially fled Moldova. Following his arrest, he pleaded guilty to the offences and publicly apologised to Tătaru.

On 24 January 2024, Tătaru and Captarenco were detained while reporting on a protest in Tiraspol, the capital of Transnistria, over the Moldovan government's decision to tax imported and exported goods coming to and from the region. They were taken for questioning by officials from the Transnistrian Ministry of State Security, were they were filmed being interrogated and made to delete footage they had recorded of the protest. Tătaru and Captarenco were released after three hours and transported to the border with Moldova. The Office of the Prosecutor General of Moldova's Office for Combating Organised Crime and Special Cases subsequently opened an investigation into the journalists' abduction.

In March 2026, an online smear campaign started against Tătaru after she reported on a flash mob held on 21 March in memory of Ludmila Vartic, a teacher who had died on 3 March after reportedly experiencing years of domestic abuse from her husband. Rumours posted online alleged that Tătaru was related to Vartic's husband's alleged mistress, which were shared hundreds of times on social media outlets including Facebook and Telegram. The Centrul pentru Jurnalism Independent, a non-governmental media organisation based in Moldova, reported that many of the accounts sharing misinformation about Tătaru appeared to be fake or automated accounts. On 25 March, Tătaru filed a police report stating she had been slandered; while one of the accounts subsequently published a retraction on Facebook, many others continued to post misinformation about Tătaru. The Office of the Prosecutor General had not responded to the situation as of 24 March.

The Committee to Protect Journalists called on Moldovan authorities to investigate the smear campaign against Tătaru and to ensure that journalists in Moldova could report freely without fear of reprisals. A statement signed by eight Moldovan media organisations stated that "disagreement with journalistic work cannot in any way justify the use of threats, insults, slander, or other acts of harassment".

On 7 October 2026 Ion Bulgac, an advisor to the Mayor of Chișinău, launched a verbal attack on Tătaru after she asked him a question about the impact caused by Termoelectrica building work in Cathedral Square. Bulgac subsequently called her a "shameless mercenary" and "below the plinth" and said that he "hated" seeing her, accusing her of "provoking" people. The Centre for Independent Journalism, alongside the Media-Guard Association, Access Info, the Committee of Freedom of the Press, the Association of Environmental Journalists and Ecological Tourism of Moldova, the Independent Press Association, and RISE Moldova issued a joint statement condemning Bulgac's "offensive language and hostile attitude" displayed towards a journalist, and called on him to apologise to Tătaru.
