= Sectorul Rîșcani =

Sector of Chișinău, Moldova

Coordinates: 47°02′40″N 28°51′42″E

Rîșcani Sectorul Rîșcani
- Administrative Sector
- Rîșcani Sector
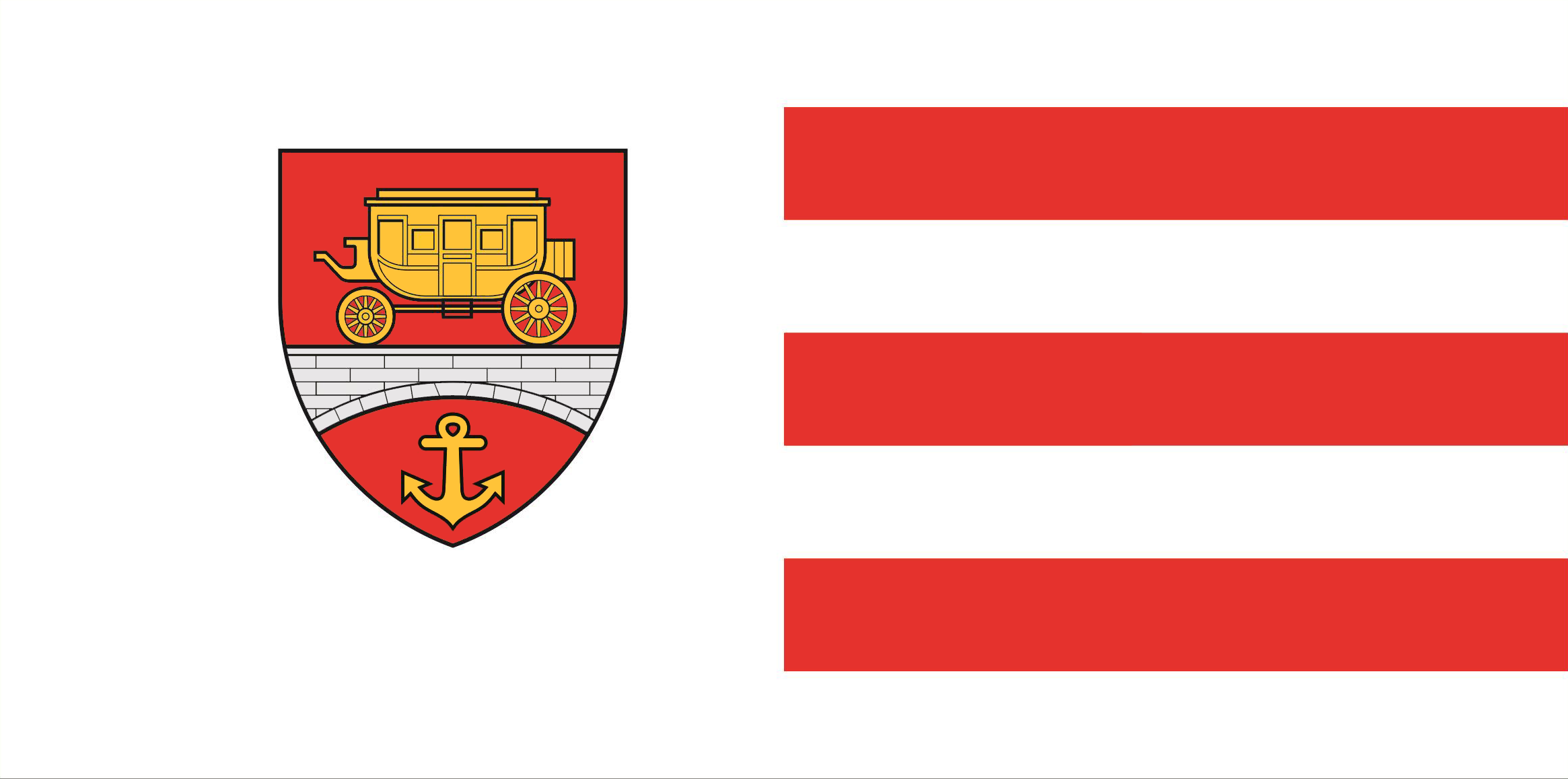
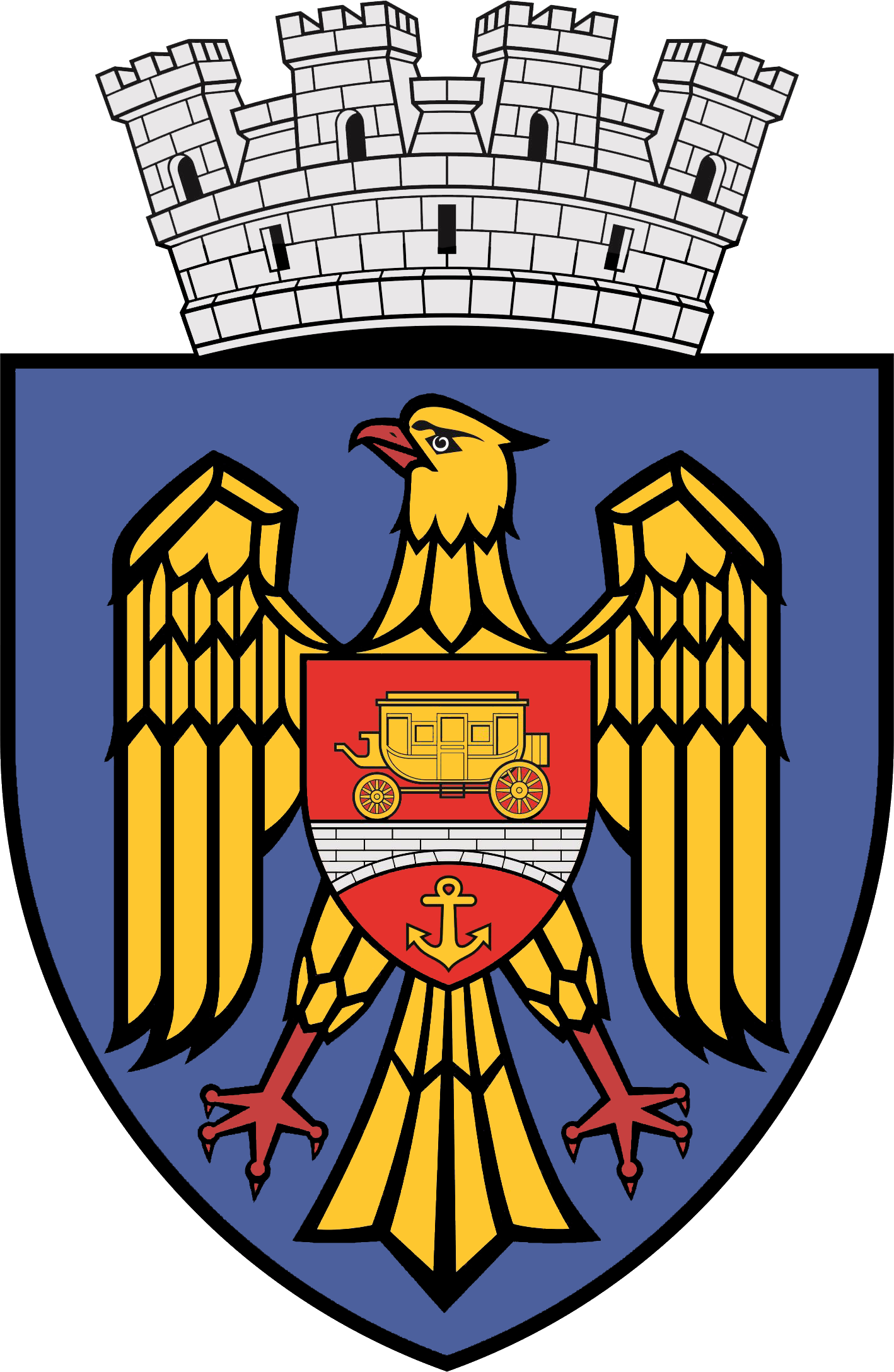
- Flag Coat of arms

- Founder: December 27, 1947

Government
  - Pretor: Vlad Melnic

Population (2013)
  - Total: 139.800
- Time zone: UTC+2 (EET)
  - Summer (DST): UTC+3 (EEST)
- Vehicle registration: C and K
- Website: https://www.rascani.md/

Sectorul Rîșcani (Romanian pronunciation: [rɨʃˈkanʲ], also spelled Râșcani) is one of the five sectors in Chișinău, the capital of Moldova. The local administration is managed by a pretor appointed by the city administration. It governs over a portion of the city of Chișinău itself (the northeastern part), the town of Cricova, and the communes of Ciorescu, Grătiești, and Stăuceni. The name of the sector comes from the name of the former eponymous village. It has a sizable population of Russians and Ukrainians. To distinguish it from the city of Rîșcani elsewhere in Moldova it is often referred to as Rîșcanovca by locals. Rîșcani‘s main street is Bulevardul Moscova. There are several parks including a park dedicated to the Soviet victims of the Afghanistan war in 1989.

The main trolleybus lines which serve Rîșcani are no. 24 and no.13, there are a number of minibuses which stop regularly along Str. Moscova and other points in the city. There is a large park near to the Afghanistan memorial park containing a large lake and woodland. Rîșcani is somewhat separated from the rest of Chișinău by a bridge. One notable building (now disused) in Rîșcani is the old state circus which has now fallen into disrepair.

== History ==
The village with the same name is attested during the reign of Alexandru cel Bun, the documents attest the existence of a village on the right bank of the Bîc that had a common border with the Chișinău estate. In other later documents we also find the name of this village - Visterniceni.

In 1772, one of the representatives of the Râșcanu family, namely, Constantin Râșcanu became the owner of the south-eastern part of the Visterniceni estate. In 1915, the genealogist Gheorghe Ghibănescu dedicated volume X of his surete and Izvoade series to the Râșcanu family. In this volume was also published the family tree which was later completed by the historian Gheorghe G. Bezviconi and then updated by the architect Dan Râșcanu. Constantin Râșcanu's son, Dumitru was the marshal of the bessarabian nobility and had in his possession half of the Estate of Visterniceni, as well as the estates of Bubuieci, Chițcani and Poșta Veche, localities currently included in the borders of Chisinau. Constantin Râșcanu is the founder of the Church of the Holy Emperors Constantine and Helen on the walls of which, along with other inscriptions, the following could be read:

- This Holy Church was built from the ground up on the means of god's servant Constantin Râșcanu great backrest, in 1777.

The modern history of the Rîșcani sector begins on April 12, 1941, when by the Decree of the Presidium of the Supreme Soviet of the MSSR, Chisinau was divided into three districts: Lenin, Krasnoarmeisk and Stalin, currently Rîșcani sector.

== Symbols ==
=== Coat of arms ===
In the azure field, a heraldic eagle with its flight descended, golden, hammered and red-fitting. Everywhere, in the red field, a silver bridge, built black, on which stands a stripped, golden diligence, and accompanied under the arch by an anchor, also of gold. Shield stamped by a silver mural crown with four towers.

=== Flag ===
The flag represents a rectangular canvas (1:2), vertically split, wearing in the middle of the white acorn, in a heraldic shield of triangular type (1/2 h), the small coat of arms of the Rîșcani sector (in the red field, a white bridge, built black, on which stands a stripped, yellow diligence, and accompanied under the arch by an anchor, also yellow) and having the fasciat swing, white and red, in seven strands.

Cricova (town)
Ciorescu (commune)

Făurești
Goian

Grătiești (commune)

Hulboaca

Stăuceni (town)

Goianul Nou
