= Hîncești =

- Municipality
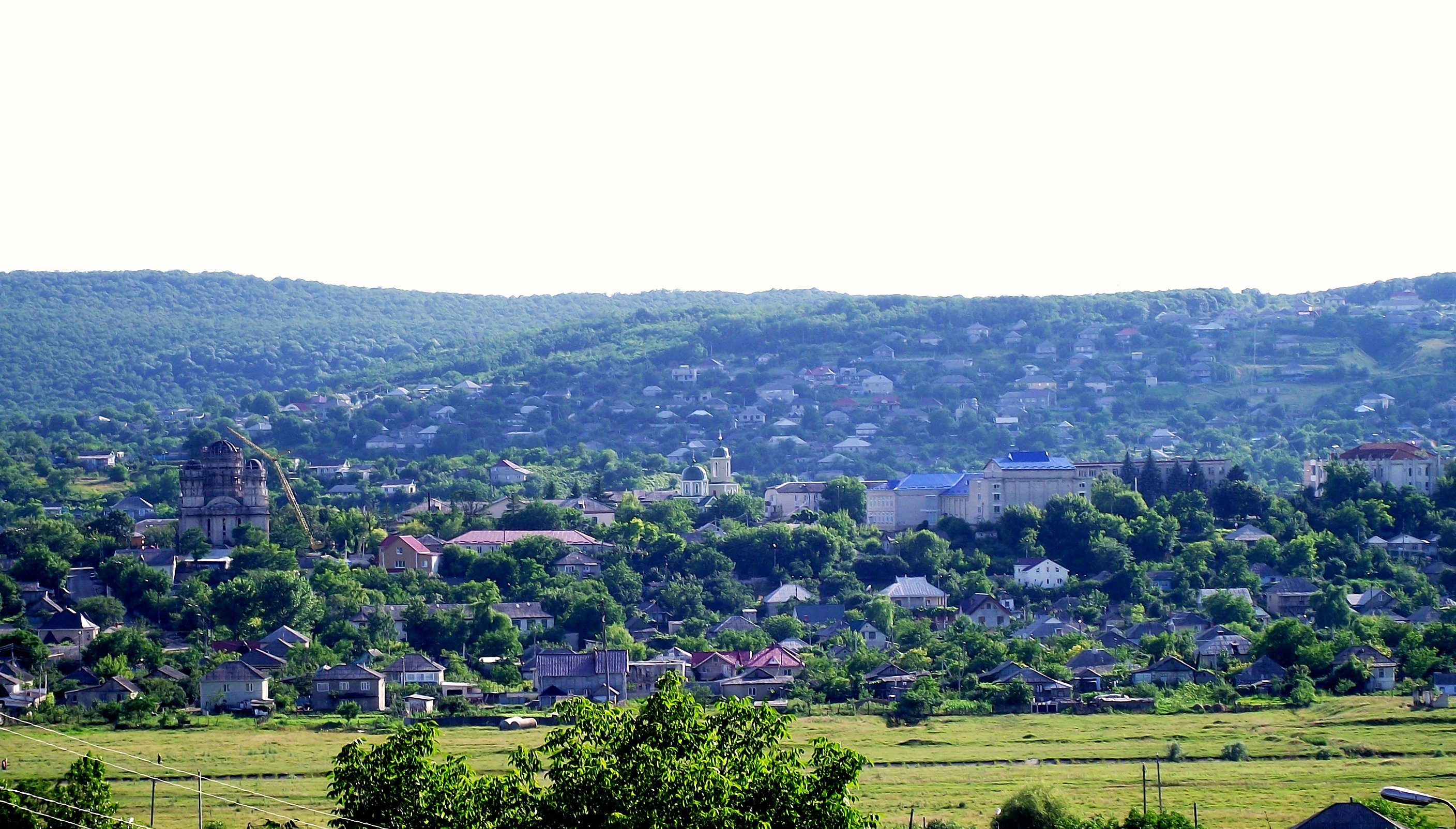

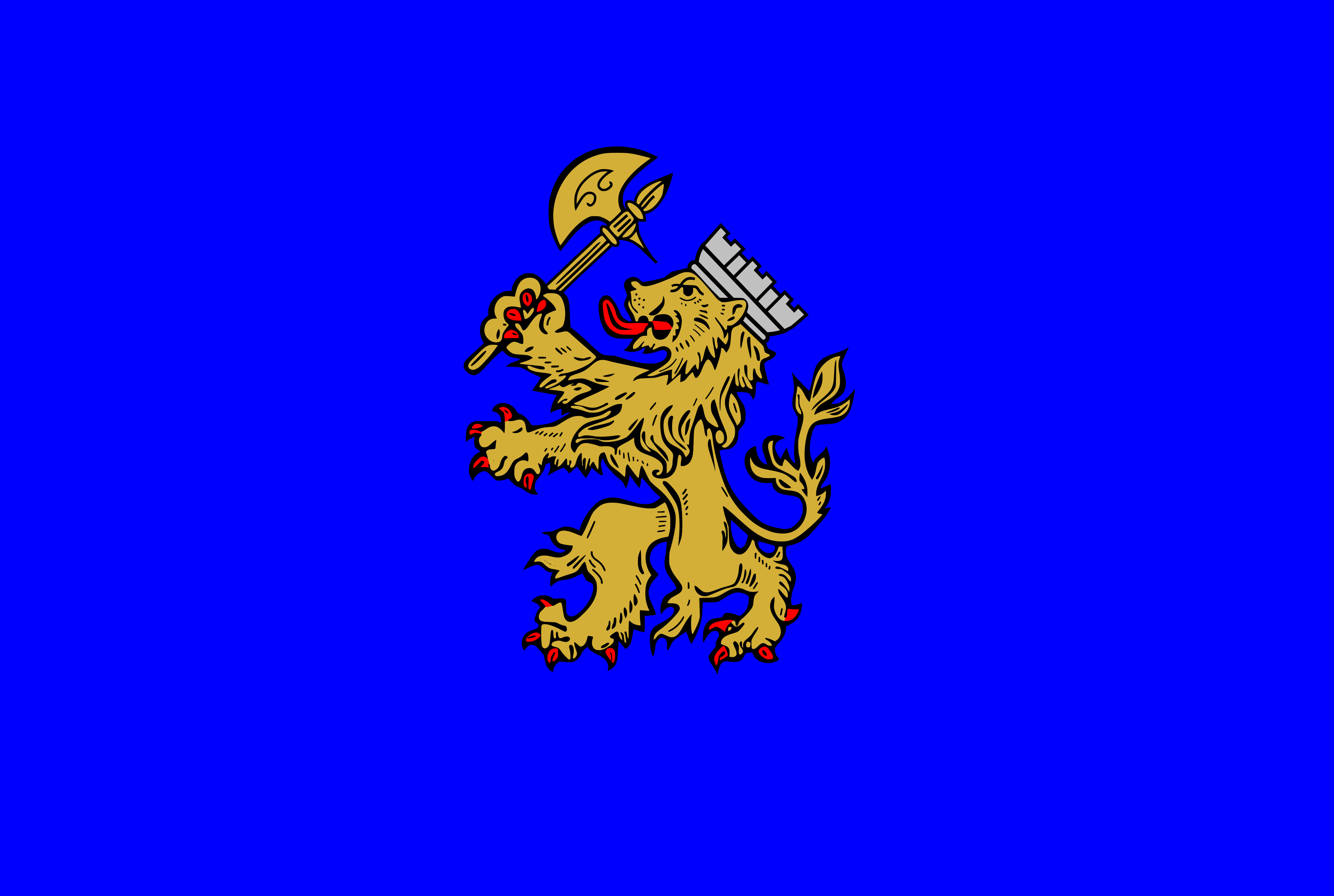
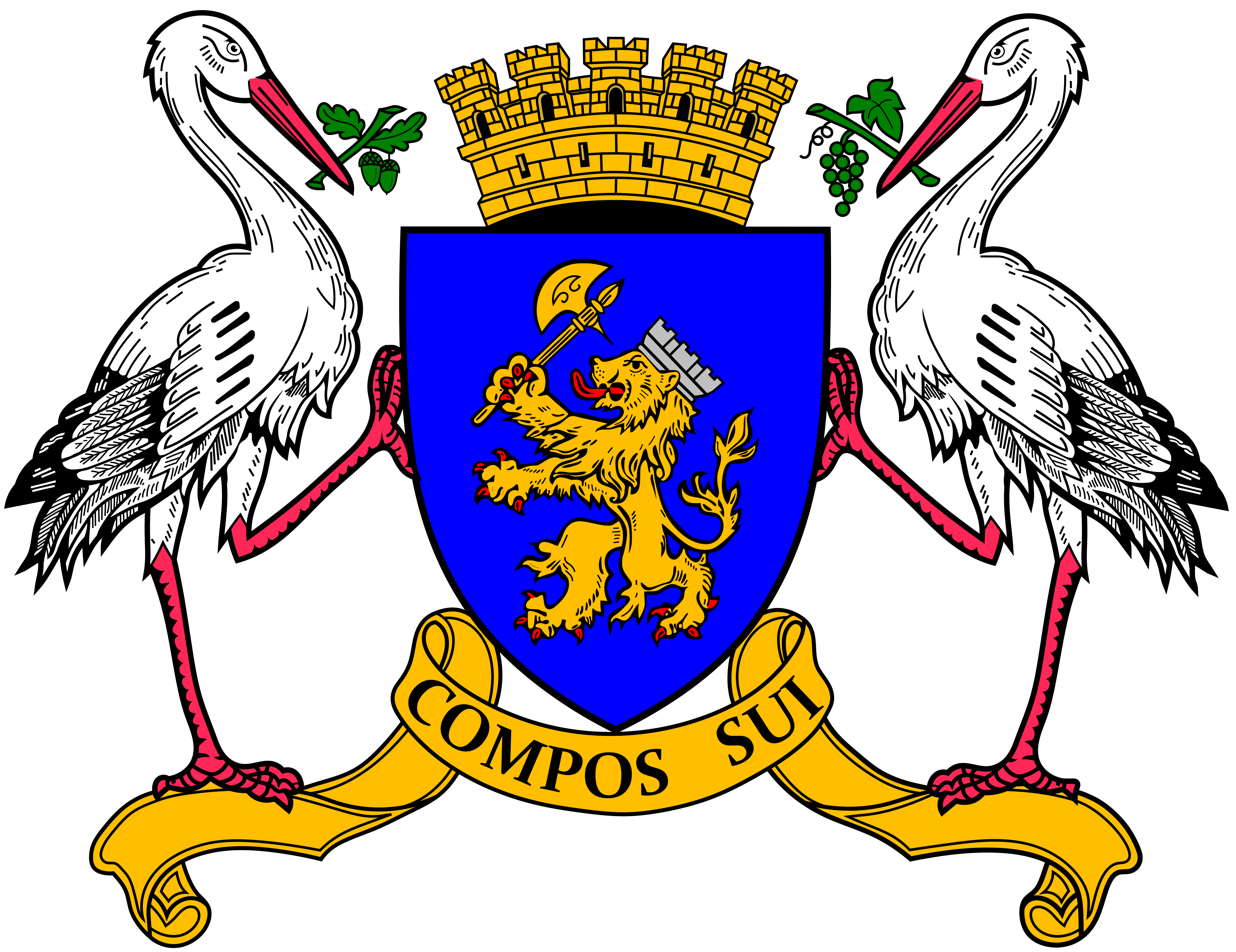
- Flag Seal

- Location within Moldova
- Coordinates: 46°49′N 28°35′E
- Country: Moldova
- District: Hîncești District

Government
  - Mayor: Alexandru Botnari (PDCM)

Population (2014)
  - Total: 12,491
- Time zone: UTC+2 (EET)
  - Summer (DST): UTC+3 (EEST)
- Postal code: MD-3401
- Area code: +373 269
- Climate: Dfb

Hîncești (Romanian pronunciation: [hɨnˈt͡ʃeʃtʲ]) is a city and municipality in Moldova.

Hîncești is situated on the Cogâlnic River, 33 km (21 mi) southwest of the Moldovan capital, Chișinău. Since 2003 it has been the seat of Hîncești District.

== History ==
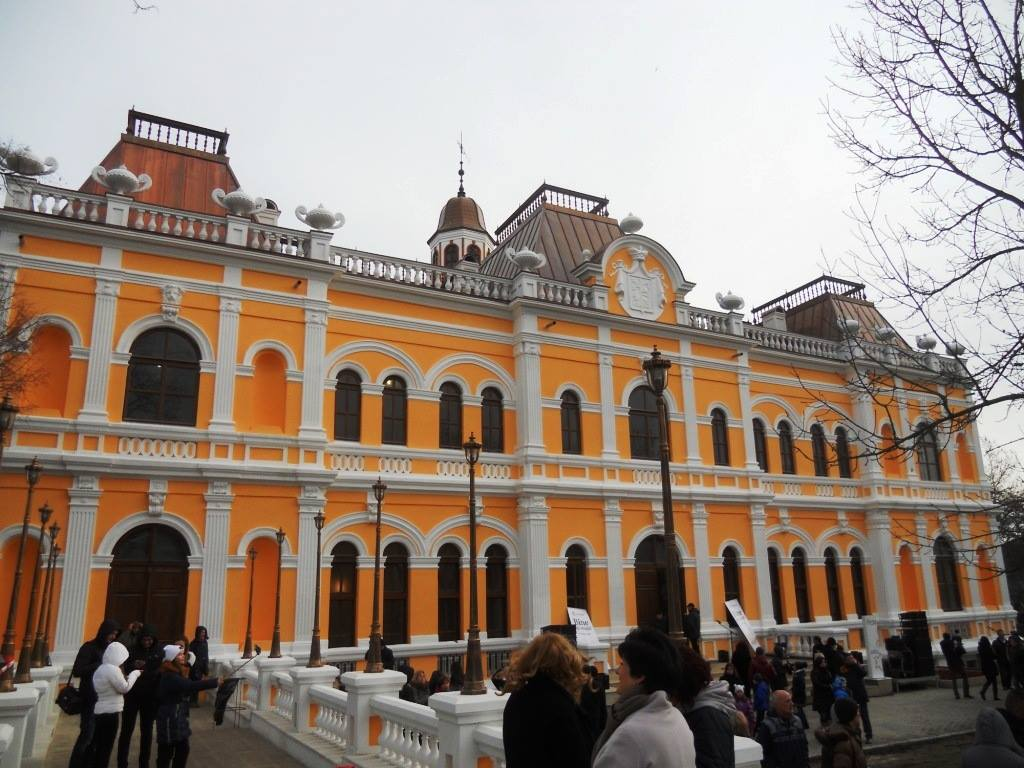
Manuc Bei's Mansion in Hîncești

Hîncești was established in 1500 AD as Dobreni. It was part of the Principality of Moldavia until its annexation by Russia in 1812. Within the Russian Empire it was known under the Russified name Gincheshty (Гинчешты), but in Romanian as Hîncești. After World War I, it became part of Romania, formed in the meantime from the unification of the principalities of Wallachia and Moldavia. During World War II, it was occupied by the Soviet Union in 1940, which changed its name to Kotovskoe after Grigore Kotovski, who was born there. But from 1941 to 1944 it was again known as Hîncești, when Romania regained control of the settlement. Before WWII, the Jewish community was rather large, in 1930, there were 1,523 Jews living there.

From 1945 to 1965 it was called Kotovskoe, which in 1965 was changed to Kotovsk. Since 1990 it is again called Hîncești.

== Demographics ==
According to the 2024 census, 11,391 inhabitants lived in Hîncești, a decrease compared to the previous census in 2014, when 12,491 inhabitants were registered.

Ethnic composition of Hîncești (2024)
1. Moldovans (Note: There is an ongoing controversy regarding the ethnic identification of Moldovans and Romanians.) (82.0%)
2. Romanians (11.8%)
3. Russians (2.10%)
4. Ukrainians (2.00%)
5. Romani (1.00%)
6. Others (1.20%)
Linguistic composition of Hîncești (2024)
1. Moldovan (Note: In March 2023, the Parliament of Moldova passed a law updating all legislative texts and the constitution to refer to the national language as Romanian, effectively rendering the term "Moldovan" obsolete.) (51.4%)
2. Romanian (40.9%)
3. Russian (5.00%)
4. Ukrainian (1.00%)
5. Romani (0.80%)
6. Other (0.90%)

Historical population
Year	Pop.	±%
1930	6,338	—
1959	8,694	+37.2%
1970	14,201	+63.3%
1979	16,677	+17.4%
1989	19,235	+15.3%
2004	15,281	−20.6%
2014	12,491	−18.3%
2024	11,391	−8.8%

In 1890, Hîncești had a stable population of 3,098 citizens. By 1970, the population had increased to 14.3 thousand, and by 1991, to 19.3 thousand.

== Education ==
There are four Lyceum (junior colleges) in Hîncești:

- Mihai Viteazul Lyceum
- Mikhail Lomonosov Lyceum
- Mihai Sadoveanu Lyceum
- Mihai Eminescu Lyceum
- Timotei Bătrânu Arts School

== Sports ==
The local football club is FC Petrocub Hîncești.

== Notable citizens ==
- Manuc Bei (1769–1817), Armenian merchant, diplomat, boyar, and inn-keeper
- Jana Costachi (born 1966), Moldovan lawyer and diplomat
- Victoria Furtună (born 1981), Moldovan prosecutor and politician
- Grigory Kotovsky (1881–1925), Soviet military leader and Communist activist
- Natalia Morari (born 1984), Moldovan journalist
- Ludmila Vartic (died 2026), Moldovan victim of domestic abuse

== International relations ==
=== Twin towns – Sister cities ===
Hîncești is twinned with:

- Ploiești, Romania
- Or Akiva, Israel
