= Temeleuți, Florești =

Temeleuți
- Village
- Location within Moldova
- Coordinates: 47.9772222222°N 28.4963888889°E
- Country: Moldova
- District: Florești District

Government
  - Mayor: Sergiu Tertea (PDM)

Population (2014 census)
  - Total: 1,073
- Time zone: UTC+2 (EET)
  - Summer (DST): UTC+3 (EEST)

Temeleuți is a village in Florești District, Moldova.
