= TV8 (Moldovan TV channel) =

- Current logo of TV8.
- Country: Moldova
- Headquarters: str. Alecu Russo 1, 21, Chișinău, MD-2068, Republica Moldova

Ownership
- Owner: Public Association „Media Alternativa”

History
- Launched: March 1, 2006
- Former names: TV7

Links
- Website: tv8.md

The network's first logo from 2006 to 2008, as TV7.

TV8 (formerly TV7) is a nonprofit television network based in Chișinău, Moldova. It is owned by the Public Association “Media Alternativa”. TV8 uses a programming strategy of international movies and tv shows, as well as local talk shows and news broadcasting. In 2017 the then owner of the channel, Chiril Lucinschi, transferred his ownership to "Media Alternativa". After the transfer, TV7 rebranded to TV8. The television channel was launched on 1 March 2006 as TV7 and changed its name to TV8 on 29 June 2017, 11 years after it was called TV7.

== Current Programs ==
- Știri cu Angela Gonța (English: News with Angela Gonța) is the network’s main Romanian language news program which airs on weekdays at 7 p.m.
- Новости с Яной Степаненко (English: News with Iana Stepanenco) and Новости с Ириной Стряпко (English: News with Irina Striapco) are the network’s main Russian language news programs which air on weekdays at 10.45 p.m.
- Cutia Neagră (English: The Black Box) is a talk show centred on corruption with elements of investigative journalism. The show is hosted by Mariana Rață and airs every Monday at 9.30 p.m.
- Întreabă Ghețu (English: Ghețu asks) is a talk show hosted by Natalia Ghețu which airs every Friday at 9.30 p.m. The topics discussed usually include important political and social events.
- Dincolo de Nistru (English: Beyond the Dniester) is a documentary series about the life of transnistrians. It is hosted by Viorica Tătaru and Andrei Captarenco and airs every Sunday at 10.45 a.m.
- Efect 9.6 (English: 9.6 Effect) is a show about the social conflicts that occur in Moldova. It is hosted by Angelica Frolov and airs on Saturdays at 11.20 a.m.
- Corupția în Vizor (English: Corruption in sight) is a show produced as a part of the “Civil society mobilization for monitoring public integrity and anti-corruption activities in Moldova” project implemented by the Moldovan subsidiary of Transparency International and financed by the Embassy of the United States to Moldova. It is hosted by Sergiu Niculiță and airs on Saturdays at 5.00 p.m.
- Iubește viața (English: Love life) is a show about authentic and dramatic life stories of different people. It is hosted by Tatiana Granciuc and airs on weekdays at 4.45 p.m.

== Awards and recognitions ==
2020: TV8 was the only television network included in the Moldovan Mass Media White Book published by the Independent Journalism Center.

2020: The network’s executive director, Natalia Morari won the „Stories of Injustice” prize awarded by the Czech NGO People in Need for promoting democratic values.

2019: The network won the National Journalistic Ethics and Deontology Prize awarded by the Press Council of Moldova

== Ratings ==
According to a survey conducted between 16 November 2019 and 8 December 2019 on behalf of the International Republican Institute, TV8 was considered to be the most trustworthy channel for political information by 13% of nationwide respondents and 15% of respondents from Chișinău (ranked fifth). In addition, 18% of nationwide respondents and 26% of respondents from Chișinău said they watched the channel for political information (ranked sixth).
