= A7 (company) =

Russian payment intermediary

- Type: private company
- Industry: financial services
- Founded: 2024; 2 years ago
- Founder: Ilan Shor
- Owner: Ilan Shor (51%), Promsvyazbank (49%)
- Number of employees: 2,000 (2026)

A7 is the Russian payment intermediary company that provides cross-border money transfers, best known for enabling large-scale sanctions evasion following the 2022 unprovoked military aggression of Ukraine by Russia.

== Operations ==
A7 enables cross-border money transfers to Russian individuals and entities, including those under sanctions.

A7 utilizes bank infrastructure in Russia and Kyrgyzstan, a Kyrzyzstan-based cryptocurrency exchange Grinex (a successor to now-defunct Garantex and a network of shell companies in third countries.

A7 issues its own stablecoin A7A5 pegged to the Russian Ruble and ostensibly backed by fiat ruble deposits in Promsvyazbank. The company and its cryptocurrency are closely tied to Shor's previous activities and companies in the Seychelles and the UAE.

== Ownership ==
A7's key shareholders are Ilan Shor, a fugitive Moldovan oligarch, a Russian citizen, and Federal Security Service informant (51%), and the state-owned Russian Promsvyazbank (49%).

A7 has close ties to a Russian state-owned VEB.RF development bank. Nearly all A7 executives are also VEB.RF employees, and VEB.RF is a shareholder of some of A7's legal entities.

A7 allegedly has ties to Roman Abramovich. For instance, A7 rented offices from Abramovich's companies and received significant financial support from Abramovich's close confidant, Viktor Kharitonin. An informant of Russian investigative project Proekt Media Abramovich a sponsor and a protector of A7.

== Use cases ==
The scheme operated by A7 is widely used by manufacturers of Russian loitering munitions, one-way attack drones, and reconnaissance drones.

Other clients of A7 include (but are not limited to) Biblio Globus (touristic company owned by Arkady Rotenberg), Wildberries (marketplace owned by Tatiana Bakalchuk and Suleiman Kerimov), International Tobacco Group, jewelry stores chain Sunlight, Arctic LPG project owned by Leonid Mikhelson, Rosatom, S7, Rappart Services (manufacturer of components for Sukhoi SuperJet 100), Agro Alliance (agriculutre company owned by the family of Sergey Naryshkin), and VTB Bank.

A7 scheme had been allegedly utilized by the Russian authorities to transfer funds intended to influence 2025 Moldovan parliamentary election. Individuals associated with Shor had further reportedly used an encrypted application that hides user identities and transactions to distribute the money.

== Sanctions ==
A7 network was targeted by sanctions from Western governments. They include

- The UK’s Foreign, Commonwealth and Development Office (FCDO) imposing restrictions on HTX cryptocurrency exchange which channeled over USD 1.5 billion to Russia through Garantex and Grinex within the A7 scheme. Further sanctions were added in July 2026.
- On 23 July 2026, the Council of the European Union sanctioned A7 and related individuals and entities.
- On 1 October 2026, the Office of Foreign Assets Control added branches of A7 in Russia, Kyrgyzstan, Nigeria and Zimbabwe to its Transnational Criminal Organizations list pursuant to Executive Order 13581.
