= List of executive actions by Barack Obama =

The president of the United States may take any of several kinds of executive actions.

Executive orders are issued to help officers and agencies of the executive branch manage the operations within the federal government itself. Presidential memoranda are closely related, and have the force of law on the Executive Branch, but are generally considered less prestigious. Presidential memoranda do not have an established process for issuance, and unlike executive orders, they are not numbered. A presidential determination results in an official policy or position of the executive branch of the United States government. A presidential proclamation is a statement issued by a president on a matter of public policy, under specific authority granted to the president by Congress, typically on a matter of widespread interest. Administrative orders are signed documents such as notices, letters, and orders, that can be issued to conduct administrative operations of the federal government. A presidential notice or a presidential sequestration order can also be issued.

Listed below are executive orders numbered 13489–13764 and presidential memoranda signed by U.S. President Barack Obama (2009-2017). There are an additional 1186 presidential proclamations that are not included here, but many of these can be seen on Wikisource. The signing statements made by Obama during his time in office have been archived here.

== Executive orders ==
View source data.

=== 2009 ===
Relative No.	Absolute No.	Title / Description	Date signed	Date published	Date(s) effective	FR Citation	FR Doc. Number	Ref.
1	13489	Presidential Records	January 21, 2009	January 26, 2009	January 21, 2009	74 FR 4669	E9-1712	
2	13490	Ethics Commitments by Executive Branch Personnel	January 21, 2009	January 26, 2009	January 21, 2009	74 FR 4673	E9-1719	
3	13491	Ensuring Lawful Interrogations	January 22, 2009	January 27, 2009	January 22, 2009	74 FR 4893	E9-1885	
4	13492	Review and Disposition of Individuals Detained At the Guantánamo Bay Naval Base and Closure of Detention Facilities	January 22, 2009	January 27, 2009	January 22, 2009	74 FR 4897	E9-1893	
5	13493	Review of Detention Policy Options	January 22, 2009	January 27, 2009	January 22, 2009	74 FR 4901	E9-1895	
6	13494	Economy in Government Contracting	January 30, 2009	February 4, 2009	January 30, 2009	74 FR 6101	E9-2483	
7	13495	Nondisplacement of Qualified Workers Under Service Contracts	January 30, 2009	February 4, 2009	January 30, 2009	74 FR 6103	E9-2484	
8	13496	Notification of Employee Rights Under Federal Labor Laws	January 30, 2009	February 4, 2009	January 30, 2009	74 FR 6107	E9-2485	
9	13497	Revocation of Certain Executive Orders Concerning Regulatory Planning and Review	January 30, 2009	February 4, 2009	January 30, 2009	74 FR 6113	E9-2486	
10	13498	Amendments to Executive Order 13199 and Establishment of the President's Advisory Council for Faith-Based and Neighborhood Partnerships	February 5, 2009	February 9, 2009	February 5, 2009	74 FR 6533	E9-2493	
11	13499	Further Amendments to Executive Order 12835, Establishment of the National Economic Council	February 5, 2009	February 11, 2009	February 5, 2010	74 FR 6979	E9-3106	
12	13500	Further Amendments to Executive Order 12859, Establishment of the Domestic Policy Council	February 5, 2009	February 11, 2009	February 5, 2009	74 FR 6981	E9-3108	
13	13501	Establishment of the President's Economic Recovery Advisory Board	February 6, 2009	February 11, 2009	February 6, 2009	74 FR 6983	E9-3112	
14	13502	Use of Project Labor Agreements for Federal Construction Projects	February 6, 2009	February 11, 2009	February 6, 2009	74 FR 6985	E9-3113	
15	13503	Establishment of the White House Office of Urban Affairs	February 19, 2009	February 24, 2009	February 19, 2009	74 FR 8139	E9-4068	
16	13504	Amending Executive Order 13390	February 20, 2009	February 24, 2009	February 20, 2009	74 FR 8431	E9-4103	
17	13505	Removing Barriers to Responsible Scientific Research Involving Human Stem Cells	March 9, 2009	March 11, 2009	March 9, 2009	74 FR 10667	E9-5441	
18	13506	Establishing a White House Council on Women And Girls	March 11, 2009	March 16, 2009	March 11, 2009	74 FR 11271	E9-5802	
19	13507	Establishment of the White House Office of Health Reform	April 8, 2009	April 13, 2009	April 8, 2009	74 FR 17071	E9-8572	
20	13508	Chesapeake Bay Protection and Restoration	May 12, 2009	May 15, 2009	May 12, 2009	74 FR 23099	E9-11547	
21	13509	Establishing a White House Council on Automotive Communities and Workers	June 23, 2009	June 26, 2009	June 23, 2009	74 FR 30903	E9-15368	
22	13510	Waiver Under the Trade Act of 1974 With Respect to the Republic of Belarus	July 1, 2009	July 6, 2009	July 1, 2009	74 FR 32047	E9-16034	
23	13511	Continuance of Certain Federal Advisory Committees	September 29, 2009	October 1, 2009	September 29, 2009	74 FR 50909	E9-23886	
24	13512	Amending Executive Order 13390	September 29, 2009	October 2, 2009	September 29, 2009	74 FR 50911	E9-23915	
25	13513	Federal Leadership On Reducing Text Messaging While Driving	October 1, 2009	October 6, 2009	October 1, 2009	74 FR 51225	E9-24203	
26	13514	Federal Leadership in Environmental, Energy, and Economic Performance	October 5, 2009	October 8, 2009	October 5, 2009	74 FR 52117	E9-24518	
27	13515	Increasing Participation of Asian Americans and Pacific Islanders in Federal Programs	October 14, 2009	October 19, 2009	October 14, 2009	74 FR 53635	E9-25268	
28	13516	Amending Executive Order 13462	November 2, 2009	November 2, 2009	November 2, 2009	74 FR 56521	E9-26408	
29	13517	Amendments to Executive Orders 13183 and 13494	October 30, 2009	November 5, 2009	October 30, 2009	74 FR 57239	E9-26834	
30	13518	Employment of Veterans in the Federal Government	November 9, 2009	November 13, 2009	November 9, 2009	74 FR 58533	E9-27441	
31	13519	Establishment of the Financial Fraud Enforcement Task Force	November 17, 2009	November 19, 2009	November 17, 2009	74 FR 60123	E9-28022	
32	13520	Reducing Improper Payments	November 20, 2009	November 25, 2009	November 20, 2009	74 FR 62201	E9-28493	
33	13521	Establishing the Presidential Commission for the Study of Bioethical Issues	November 24, 2009	November 30, 2009	November 24, 2009	74 FR 62671	E9-28805	
34	13522	Creating Labor-Management Forums to Improve Delivery of Government Services	December 9, 2009	December 14, 2009	December 9, 2009	74 FR 66203	E9-29781	
35	13523	Half-Day Closing of Executive Departments and Agencies on Thursday, December 24, 2009	December 11, 2009	December 16, 2009	December 11, 2009	74 FR 66563	E9-30020	
36	13524	Amending Executive Order 12425 Designating Interpol as a Public International Organization Entitled To Enjoy Certain Privileges, Exemptions, and Immunities	December 16, 2009	December 21, 2009	December 16, 2009	74 FR 67803	E9-30413	
37	13525	Adjustments of Certain Rates of Pay	December 23, 2009	December 30, 2009	December 23, 2009	74 FR 69231	E9-31098	
38	13526	Classified National Security Information	December 29, 2009	January 5, 2010	December 29, 2009	75 FR 705	E9-31418	
39	13527	Establishing Federal Capability for the Timely Provision of Medical Countermeasures Following a Biological Attack	December 30, 2009	January 6, 2010	December 30, 2009	75 FR 737	2010-38	

=== 2010 ===
Relative No.	Absolute No.	Title / Description	Date signed	Date published	Date(s) effective	FR Citation	FR Doc. Number	Ref.
40	13528	Establishment of the Council of Governors	January 11, 2010	January 24, 2010	January 11, 2010	75 FR 2053	2010-705	
41	13529	Ordering the Selected Reserve and Certain Individual Ready Reserve Members of the Armed Forces to Active Duty	January 16, 2010	January 21, 2010	January 16, 2010	75 FR 3331	2010-1229	
42	13530	President's Advisory Council on Financial Capability	January 29, 2010	February 3, 2010	January 29, 2010	75 FR 5481	2010-2419	
43	13531	National Commission on Fiscal Responsibility and Reform	February 18, 2010	February 23, 2010	February 18, 2010	75 FR 7927	2010-3725	
44	13532	Promoting Excellence, Innovation, and Sustainability at Historically Black Colleges and Universities	February 26, 2010	March 3, 2010	February 26, 2010	75 FR 9747	2010-4593	
45	13533	Providing an Order of Succession Within the Department of Defense	March 1, 2010	March 5, 2010	March 1, 2010	75 FR 10163	2010-4884	
46	13534	National Export Initiative	March 11, 2010	March 16, 2010	March 11, 2010	75 FR 12433	2010-5837	
47	13535	Ensuring Enforcement and Implementation of Abortion Restrictions in the Patient Protection and Affordable Care Act	March 24, 2010	March 29, 2010	March 24, 2010	75 FR 15597	2010-7154	
48	13536	Blocking Property of Certain Persons Contributing to the Conflict in Somalia	April 12, 2010	April 15, 2010	April 12, 2010	75 FR 19869	2010-8878	
49	13537	Interagency Group on Insular Areas	April 14, 2010	April 19, 2010	April 14, 2010	75 FR 20237	2010-9078	
50	13538	Establishing the President's Management Advisory Board	April 19, 2010	April 22, 2010	April 19, 2010	75 FR 20895	2010-9451	
51	13539	President's Council of Advisors on Science and Technology	April 21, 2010	April 27, 2010	April 21, 2010	75 FR 21973	2010-9796	
52	13540	Interagency Task Force on Veterans Small Business Development	April 26, 2010	April 29, 2010	April 26, 2010	75 FR 22497	2010-10172	
53	13541	Temporary Organization To Facilitate a Strategic Partnership With the Republic of Iraq	May 7, 2010	May 12, 2010	May 7, 2010	75 FR 26879	2010-11557	
54	13542	Providing an Order of Succession Within the Department of Agriculture	May 13, 2010	May 18, 2010	May 13, 2010	75 FR 27921	2010-12070	
55	13543	National Commission on the BP Deepwater Horizon Oil Spill and Offshore Drilling	May 21, 2010	May 26, 2010	May 21, 2010	75 FR 29397	2010-12805	
56	13544	Establishing the National Prevention, Health Promotion, and Public Health Council	June 10, 2010	June 16, 2010	June 10, 2010	75 FR 33983	2010-14613	
57	13545	President's Council on Fitness, Sports, and Nutrition	June 22, 2010	June 28, 2010	June 22, 2010	75 FR 37281	2010-15851	
58	13546	Optimizing the Security of Biological Select Agents and Toxins in the United States	July 2, 2010	July 8, 2010	July 2, 2010	75 FR 39437	2010-16864	
59	13547	Stewardship of the Ocean, Our Coasts, and the Great Lakes	July 19, 2010	July 22, 2010	July 19, 2010	75 FR 43021	2010-18167	
60	13548	Increasing Federal Employment of Individuals With Disabilities	July 26, 2010	July 30, 2010	July 26, 2010	75 FR 45039	2010-18988	
61	13549	Classified National Security Information Program for State, Local, Tribal, and Private Sector Entities	August 18, 2010	August 23, 2010	August 18, 2010	75 FR 51609	2010-21016	
62	13550	Establishment of Pakistan and Afghanistan Support Office	August 18, 2010	August 23, 2010	August 18, 2010	75 FR 51615	2010-21020	
63	13551	Blocking Property of Certain Persons With Respect to North Korea	August 30, 2010	September 1, 2010	August 30, 2010	75 FR 53837	2010-22002	
64	13552	2010 Amendments to the Manual for Courts-Martial, United States	August 31, 2010	September 3, 2010	August 31, 2010	75 FR 54263	2010-22279	
65	13553	Blocking Property of Certain Persons With Respect to Serious Human Rights Abuses by the Government of Iran and Taking Certain Other Actions	September 28, 2010	October 1, 2010	September 28, 2010	75 FR 60567	2010-24839	
66	13554	Establishing the Gulf Coast Ecosystem Restoration Task Force	October 5, 2010	October 8, 2010	October 5, 2010	75 FR 62313	2010-25578	
67	13555	White House Initiative on Educational Excellence for Hispanics	October 19, 2010	October 22, 2010	October 19, 2010	75 FR 65415	2010-27004	
68	13556	Controlled Unclassified Information	November 4, 2010	November 9, 2010	November 4, 2010	75 FR 68675	2010-28360	
69	13557	Providing an Order of Succession Within the Department of Justice	November 4, 2010	November 9, 2010	November 4, 2010	75 FR 68679	2010-28365	
70	13558	Export Enforcement Coordination Center	November 9, 2010	November 15, 2010	November 9, 2010	75 FR 69573	2010-28854	
71	13559	Fundamental Principles and Policymaking Criteria for Partnerships With Faith-Based and Other Neighborhood Organizations	November 17, 2010	November 22, 2010	November 17, 2010	75 FR 71317	2010-29579	
72	13560	White House Council for Community Solutions	December 14, 2010	December 17, 2010	December 14, 2010	75 FR 78875	2010-31878	
73	13561	Adjustments of Certain Rates of Pay	December 22, 2010	December 29, 2010	December 22, 2010	75 FR 81817	2010-32960	
74	13562	Recruiting and Hiring Students and Recent Graduates	December 27, 2010	December 30, 2010	December 27, 2010	75 FR 82583	2010-33169	

=== 2011 ===
Relative No.	Absolute No.	Title / Description	Date signed	Date published	Date(s) effective	FR Citation	FR Doc. Number	Ref.
75	13563	Improving Regulation and Regulatory Review	January 18, 2011	January 21, 2011	January 18, 2011	76 FR 3821	2011-1385	
76	13564	Establishment of the President's Council on Jobs and Competitiveness	January 31, 2011	February 3, 2011	January 31, 2011	76 FR 6309	2011-2577	
77	13565	Establishment of the Intellectual Property Enforcement Advisory Committees	February 8, 2011	February 11, 2011	February 8, 2011	76 FR 7681	2011-3257	
78	13566	Blocking Property and Prohibiting Certain Transactions Related to Libya	February 25, 2011	March 2, 2011	February 25, 2011	76 FR 11315	2011-4753	
79	13567	Periodic Review of Individuals Detained at Guantánamo Bay Naval Station Pursuant to the Authorization for Use of Military Force	March 7, 2011	March 10, 2011	March 7, 2011	76 FR 13275	2011-5728	
80	13568	Extending Provisions of the International Organizations Immunities Act to the Office of the High Representative in Bosnia and Herzegovina and the International Civilian Office in Kosovo	March 8, 2011	March 11, 2011	March 8, 2011	76 FR 13495	2011-5903	
81	13569	Amendments to Executive Orders 12824, 12835, 12859, and 13532, Reestablishment Pursuant to Executive Order 13498, and Revocation of Executive Order 13507	April 5, 2011	April 8, 2011	April 5, 2011	76 FR 19889	2011-8642	
82	13570	Prohibiting Certain Transactions With Respect to North Korea	April 18, 2011	April 20, 2011	April 18, 2011	76 FR 22289	2011-9739	
83	13571	Streamlining Service Delivery and Improving Customer Service	April 27, 2011	May 2, 2011	April 27, 2011	76 FR 24339	2011-10732	
84	13572	Blocking Property of Certain Persons With Respect to Human Rights Abuses in Syria	April 29, 2011	May 3, 2011	April 29, 2011	76 FR 24789	2011-10910	
85	13573	Blocking Property of Senior Officials of the Government of Syria	May 18, 2011	May 20, 2011	May 18, 2011	76 FR 29143	2011-12645	
86	13574	Authorizing the Implementation of Certain Sanctions Set Forth in the Iran Sanctions Act of 1996, as Amended	May 23, 2011	May 25, 2011	May 23, 2011	76 FR 30505	2011-13173	
87	13575	Establishment of the White House Rural Council	June 9, 2011	June 14, 2011	June 9, 2011	76 FR 34839	2011-14919	
88	13576	Delivering an Efficient, Effective, and Accountable Government	June 13, 2011	June 16, 2011	June 13, 2011	76 FR 35295	2011-15181	
89	13577	Establishment of the SelectUSA Initiative	June 15, 2011	June 20, 2011	June 15, 2011	76 FR 35715	2011-15443	
90	13578	Coordinating Policies on Automotive Communities and Workers	July 6, 2011	July 11, 2011	July 6, 2011	76 FR 40591	2011-17447	
91	13579	Regulation and Independent Regulatory Agencies	July 11, 2011	July 14, 2011	July 11, 2011	76 FR 41585	2011-17953	
92	13580	Interagency Working Group on Coordination of Domestic Energy Development and Permitting in Alaska	July 12, 2011	July 15, 2011	July 12, 2011	76 FR 41987	2011-18065	
93	13581	Blocking Property of Transnational Criminal Organizations	July 24, 2011	July 27, 2011	July 24, 2011	76 FR 44757	2011-19156	
94	13582	Blocking Property of the Government of Syria and Prohibiting Certain Transactions With Respect to Syria	August 17, 2011	August 22, 2011	August 17, 2011	76 FR 52211	2011-21505	
95	13583	Establishing a Coordinated Government-Wide Initiative to Promote Diversity and Inclusion in the Federal Workforce	August 18, 2011	August 23, 2011	August 18, 2011	76 FR 52845	2011-21704	
96	13584	Developing an Integrated Strategic Counterterrorism Communications Initiative and Establishing a Temporary Organization to Support Certain Government-wide Communications Activities Directed Abroad	September 9, 2011	September 15, 2011	September 9, 2011	76 FR 56945	2011-23891	
97	13585	Continuance of Certain Federal Advisory Committees	September 30, 2011	October 7, 2011	September 30, 2011	76 FR 62281	2011-26141	
98	13586	Establishing an Emergency Board to Investigate Disputes Between Certain Railroads Represented by the National Carriers' Conference Committee of the National Railway Labor Conference and Their Employees Represented by Certain Labor Organizations	October 6, 2011	October 12, 2011	October 6, 2011	76 FR 63533	2011-26574	
99	13587	Structural Reforms To Improve the Security of Classified Networks and the Responsible Sharing and Safeguarding of Classified Information	October 7, 2011	October 13, 2011	October 7, 2011	76 FR 63815	2011-26729	
100	13588	Reducing Prescription Drug Shortages	October 31, 2011	November 3, 2011	October 31, 2011	76 FR 68295	2011-28728	
101	13589	Promoting Efficient Spending	November 9, 2011	November 15, 2011	November 9, 2011	76 FR 70864	2011-29683	
102	13590	Authorizing the Imposition of Certain Sanctions With Respect to the Provision of Goods, Services, Technology, or Support for Iran's Energy and Petrochemical Sectors	November 20, 2011	November 23, 2011	November 20, 2011	76 FR 72609	2011-30463	
103	13591	Continuance of Certain Federal Advisory Committees	November 23, 2011	November 30, 2011	November 23, 2011	76 FR 74621	2011-30990	
104	13592	Improving American Indian and Alaska Native Educational Opportunities and Strengthening Tribal Colleges and Universities	December 2, 2011	December 8, 2011	December 2, 2011	76 FR 76603	2011-31624	
105	13593	2011 Amendments to the Manual for Courts-Martial, United States	December 13, 2011	December 16, 2011	December 13, 2011	76 FR 78463	2011-32486	
106	13594	Adjustments of Certain Rates of Pay	December 19, 2011	December 23, 2011	December 19, 2011	76 FR 80191	2011-33087	
107	13595	Instituting a National Action Plan On Women, Peace, And Security	December 19, 2011	December 23, 2011	December 19, 2011	76 FR 80205	2011-33089	
108	13596	Amendments to Executive Orders 12131 and 13539	December 19, 2011	December 27, 2011	December 19, 2011	76 FR 80726	2011-33335	

=== 2012 ===
Relative No.	Absolute No.	Title / Description	Date signed	Date published	Date(s) effective	FR Citation	FR Doc. Number	Ref.
109	13597	Establishing Visa and Foreign Visitor Processing Goals and the Task Force On Travel and Competitiveness	January 19, 2012	January 24, 2012	January 19, 2012	77 FR 3373	2012-1568	
110	13598	Assignment of Functions Relating to Certain Promotion and Appointment Actions in the Armed Forces	January 27, 2012	February 2, 2012	January 27, 2012	77 FR 5369	2012-2557	
111	13599	Blocking Property of the Government of Iran and Iranian Financial Institutions	February 5, 2012	February 8, 2012	February 5, 2012	77 FR 6657	2012-3097	
112	13600	Establishing the President's Global Development Council	February 9, 2012	February 14, 2012	February 9, 2012	77 FR 8711	2012-3616	
113	13601	Establishment of the Interagency Trade Enforcement Center	February 28, 2012	March 5, 2012	February 28, 2012	77 FR 12981	2012-5366	
114	13602	Establishing a White House Council on Strong Cities, Strong Communities	March 15, 2012	March 20, 2012	March 15, 2012	77 FR 16131	2012-6797	
115	13603	National Defense Resources Preparedness	March 16, 2012	March 22, 2012	March 16, 2012	77 FR 16651	2012-7019	
116	13604	Improving Performance of Federal Permitting and Review of Infrastructure Projects	March 22, 2012	March 28, 2012	March 22, 2012	77 FR 18885	2012-7636	
117	13605	Supporting Safe and Responsible Development of Unconventional Domestic Natural Gas Resources	April 13, 2012	April 17, 2012	April 13, 2012	77 FR 23108	2012-9473	
118	13606	Blocking the Property and Suspending Entry Into the United States of Certain Persons With Respect to Grave Human Rights Abuses by the Governments of Iran and Syria via Information Technology	April 22, 2012	April 24, 2012	April 22, 2012	77 FR 24569	2012-10034	
119	13607	Establishing Principles of Excellence for Educational Institutions Serving Service Members, Veterans, Spouses, and Other Family Members	April 27, 2012	May 2, 2012	April 27, 2012	77 FR 25861	2012-10715	
120	13608	Prohibiting Certain Transactions With and Suspending Entry Into the United States of Foreign Sanctions Evaders With Respect to Iran and Syria	May 1, 2012	May 3, 2012	May 1, 2012	77 FR 26407	2012-10884	
121	13609	Promoting International Regulatory Cooperation	May 1, 2012	May 4, 2012	May 1, 2012	77 FR 26413	2012-10968	
122	13610	Identifying and Reducing Regulatory Burdens	May 10, 2012	May 14, 2012	May 10, 2012	77 FR 28467	2012-11798	
123	13611	Blocking Property of Persons Threatening the Peace, Security, or Stability of Yemen	May 16, 2012	May 18, 2012	May 16, 2012	77 FR 29533	2012-12225	
124	13612	Providing an Order of Succession Within the Department of Agriculture	May 21, 2012	May 24, 2012	May 21, 2012	77 FR 31153	2012-12881	
125	13613	Providing an Order of Succession Within the Department of Commerce	May 21, 2012	May 24, 2012	May 21, 2012	77 FR 31156	2012-12882	
126	13614	Providing an Order of Succession Within the Environmental Protection Agency	May 21, 2012	May 24, 2012	May 21, 2012	77 FR 31157	2012-12883	
127	13615	Providing an Order of Succession Within the Office of Management and Budget	May 21, 2012	May 24, 2012	May 21, 2012	77 FR 31159	2012-12889	
128	13616	Accelerating Broadband Infrastructure Deployment	June 14, 2012	June 20, 2012	June 14, 2012	77 FR 36903	2012-15183	
129	13617	Blocking Property of the Government of the Russian Federation Relating to the Disposition of Highly Enriched Uranium Extracted From Nuclear Weapons	June 25, 2012	June 27, 2012	June 25, 2012	77 FR 38457	2012-15954	
130	13618	Assignment of National Security and Emergency Preparedness Communications Functions	July 6, 2012	July 11, 2012	July 6, 2012	77 FR 40779	2012-17022	
131	13619	Blocking Property of Persons Threatening the Peace, Security, or Stability of Burma	July 11, 2012	July 13, 2012	July 11, 2012	77 FR 41243	2012-17264	
132	13620	Taking Additional Steps to Address the National Emergency With Respect to Somalia	July 20, 2012	July 24, 2012	July 20, 2012	77 FR 43481	2012-18237	
133	13621	White House Initiative on Educational Excellence for African Americans	July 26, 2012	August 1, 2012	July 26, 2012	77 FR 45471	2012-18868	
134	13622	Authorizing Additional Sanctions With Respect to Iran	July 30, 2012	August 2, 2012	July 30, 2012	77 FR 45897	2012-19055	
135	13623	Preventing and Responding to Violence Against Women and Girls Globally	August 10, 2012	August 16, 2012	August 10, 2012	77 FR 49345	2012-20259	
136	13624	Accelerating Investment in Industrial Energy Efficiency	August 30, 2012	September 5, 2012	August 30, 2012	77 FR 54781	2012-22030	
137	13625	Improving Access to Mental Health Services for Veterans, Service Members, and Military Families	August 31, 2012	September 5, 2012	August 31, 2012	77 FR 54783	2012-22062	
138	13626	Gulf Coast Ecosystem Restoration	September 10, 2012	September 13, 2012	September 10, 2012	77 FR 56749	2012-22807	
139	13627	Strengthening Protections Against Trafficking in Persons in Federal Contracts	September 25, 2012	October 2, 2012	September 25, 2012	77 FR 60029	2012-24374	
140	13628	Authorizing the Implementation of Certain Sanctions Set Forth in the Iran Threat Reduction and Syria Human Rights Act of 2012 and Additional Sanctions With Respect to Iran	October 9, 2012	October 12, 2012	October 9, 2012	77 FR 62139	2012-25236	
141	13629	Establishing the White House Homeland Security Partnership Council	October 26, 2012	November 2, 2012	October 26, 2012	77 FR 66351	2012-27002	
142	13630	Establishment of an Interagency Task Force on Commercial Advocacy	December 6, 2012	December 11, 2012	December 6, 2012	77 FR 73893	2012-30060	
143	13631	Reestablishment of Advisory Group	December 7, 2012	December 12, 2012	December 7, 2012	77 FR 74099	2012-30170	
144	13632	Establishing the Hurricane Sandy Rebuilding Task Force	December 7, 2012	December 14, 2012	December 7, 2012	77 FR 74341	2012-30310	
145	13633	Closing of Executive Departments and Agencies of the Federal Government on Monday, December 24, 2012	December 21, 2012	December 28, 2012	December 21, 2012	77 FR 76339	2012-31225	
146	13634	Reestablishment of Advisory Commission	December 21, 2012	December 31, 2012	December 21, 2012	77 FR 77247	2012-31574	
147	13635	Adjustments of Certain Rates of Pay	December 27, 2012	January 3, 2013	December 27, 2012	78 FR 649	2013-00002	

=== 2013 ===
Relative No.	Absolute No.	Title / Description	Date signed	Date published	Date(s) effective	FR Citation	FR Doc. Number	Ref.
148	13636	Improving Critical Infrastructure Cybersecurity	February 12, 2013	February 19, 2013	February 12, 2013	78 FR 11737	2013-03915	
149	13637	Administration of Reformed Export Controls	March 8, 2013	March 13, 2013	March 8, 2013	78 FR 16127	2013-05967	
150	13638	Amendments to Executive Order 12777	March 15, 2013	March 21, 2013	March 15, 2013	78 FR 17587	2013-06712	
151	13639	Establishment of the Presidential Commission on Election Administration	March 28, 2013	April 3, 2013	March 28, 2013	78 FR 19979	2013-07837	
152	13640	Continuance of Advisory Council	April 5, 2013	April 10, 2013	April 5, 2013	78 FR 21211	2013-08501	
153	13641	Adjustments of Certain Rates of Pay	April 5, 2013	April 11, 2013	April 5, 2013	78 FR 21503	2013-08626	
154	13642	Making Open and Machine Readable the New Default for Government Information	May 9, 2013	May 14, 2013	May 9, 2013	78 FR 28111	2013-11533	
155	13643	2013 Amendments to the Manual for Courts-Martial, United States	May 15, 2013	May 21, 2013	May 15, 2013	78 FR 29559	2013-12157	
156	13644	Amendment to Executive Order 13639	May 21, 2013	May 24, 2013	May 21, 2013	78 FR 31813	2013-12650	
157	13645	Authorizing the Implementation of Certain Sanctions Set Forth in the Iran Freedom and Counter- Proliferation Act of 2012 and Additional Sanctions With Respect To Iran	June 3, 2013	June 5, 2013	June 3, 2013	78 FR 33945	2013-13523	
158	13646	Establishing the President's Advisory Council on Financial Capability for Young Americans	June 25, 2013	June 28, 2013	June 25, 2013	78 FR 39157	2013-15782	
159	13647	Establishing the White House Council on Native American Affairs	June 26, 2013	July 1, 2013	June 26, 2013	78 FR 39539	2013-15942	
160	13648	Combating Wildlife Trafficking	July 1, 2013	July 5, 2013	July 1, 2013	78 FR 40619	2013-16387	
161	13649	Accelerating Improvements in HIV Prevention and Care in the United States Through the HIV Care Continuum Initiative	July 15, 2013	July 18, 2013	July 15, 2013	78 FR 43055	2013-17478	
162	13650	Improving Chemical Facility Safety and Security	August 1, 2013	August 5, 2013	August 1, 2013	78 FR 48029	2013-19220	
163	13651	Prohibiting Certain Imports of Burmese Jadeite and Rubies	August 6, 2013	August 9, 2013	August 6, 2013	78 FR 48791	2013-19520	
164	13652	Continuance Of Certain Federal Advisory Committees	September 30, 2013	October 4, 2013	September 30, 2013	78 FR 61817	2013-24388	
165	13653	Preparing the United States for the Impacts of Climate Change	November 1, 2013	November 6, 2013	November 1, 2013	78 FR 66817	2013-26785	
166	13654	Establishing an Emergency Board To Investigate Disputes Between the Long Island Rail Road Company and Certain of Its Employees Represented by Certain Labor Organizations	November 21, 2013	November 26, 2013	November 21, 2013	78 FR 70843	2013-28581	
167	13655	Adjustments of Certain Rates of Pay	December 23, 2013	December 31, 2013	December 23, 2013	78 FR 80451	2013-31445	

=== 2014 ===
Relative No.	Absolute No.	Title / Description	Date signed	Date published	Date(s) effective	FR Citation	FR Doc. Number	Ref.
168	13656	Establishment of Afghanistan and Pakistan Strategic Partnership Office and Amendment to Executive Order 12163	January 17, 2014	January 24, 2014	January 17, 2014	79 FR 4261	2014-01523	
169	13657	Changing the Name of the National Security Staff to the National Security Council Staff	February 10, 2014	February 14, 2014	February 10, 2014	79 FR 8823	2014-03474	
170	13658	Establishing a Minimum Wage for Contractors	February 12, 2014	February 20, 2014	February 12, 2014	79 FR 9849	2014-03805	
171	13659	Streamlining the Export/Import Process for America's Businesses	February 19, 2014	February 25, 2014	February 19, 2014	79 FR 10655	2014-04254	
172	13660	Blocking Property of Certain Persons Contributing to the Situation in Ukraine	March 6, 2014	March 10, 2014	March 6, 2014	79 FR 13491	2014-05323	
173	13661	Blocking Property of Additional Persons Contributing to the Situation in Ukraine	March 16, 2014	March 19, 2014	March 16, 2014	79 FR 15533	2014-06141	
174	13662	Blocking Property of Additional Persons Contributing to the Situation in Ukraine	March 20, 2014	March 24, 2014	March 20, 2014	79 FR 16167	2014-06612	
175	13663	Establishing an Emergency Board to Investigate Disputes Between the Long Island Rail Road Company and Certain of Its Employees Represented by Certain Labor Organizations	March 20, 2014	March 25, 2014	March 20, 2014	79 FR 16645	2014-06768	
176	13664	Blocking Property of Certain Persons With Respect to South Sudan	April 3, 2014	April 7, 2014	April 3, 2014	79 FR 19281	2014-07895	
177	13665	Non-Retaliation for Disclosure of Compensation Information	April 8, 2014	April 11, 2014	April 8, 2014	79 FR 20749	2014-08426	
178	13666	Expanding Eligibility for the Defense Meritorious Service Medal	April 18, 2014	April 23, 2014	April 18, 2014	79 FR 22591	2014-09343	
179	13667	Blocking Property of Certain Persons Contributing to the Conflict in the Central African Republic	May 12, 2014	May 15, 2014	May 12, 2014	79 FR 28385	2014-11442	
180	13668	Ending Immunities Granted to the Development Fund for Iraq and Certain Other Iraqi Property and Interests in Property Pursuant to Executive Order 13303, as Amended	May 27, 2014	May 29, 2014	May 27, 2014	79 FR 31019	2014-12651	
181	13669	2014 Amendments to the Manual for Courts-Martial, United States	June 13, 2014	June 18, 2014	June 13, 2014	79 FR 34999	2014-14429	
182	13670	Establishing an Emergency Board To Investigate Disputes Between the Southeastern Pennsylvania Transportation Authority and Certain of Its Employees Represented by Certain Labor Organizations	June 14, 2014	June 18, 2014	June 14, 2014	79 FR 35029	2014-14432	
183	13671	Taking Additional Steps to Address the National Emergency With Respect to the Conflict in the Democratic Republic of the Congo	July 8, 2014	July 10, 2014	July 8, 2014	79 FR 39947	2014-16360	
184	13672	Further Amendments to Executive Order 11478, Equal Employment Opportunity in the Federal Government, and Executive Order 11246, Equal Employment Opportunity	July 21, 2014	July 23, 2014	July 21, 2014	79 FR 42971	2014-17522	
185	13673	Fair Pay and Safe Workplaces	July 31, 2014	August 5, 2014	July 31, 2014	79 FR 45309	2014-18561	
186	13674	Revised List of Quarantinable Communicable Diseases	July 31, 2014	August 6, 2014	July 31, 2014	79 FR 45671	2014-18682	
187	13675	Establishing the President's Advisory Council on Doing Business in Africa	August 5, 2014	August 8, 2014	August 5, 2014	79 FR 46659	2014-18998	
188	13676	Combating Antibiotic-Resistant Bacteria	September 18, 2014	September 23, 2014	September 18, 2014	79 FR 56931	2014-22805	
189	13677	Climate-Resilient International Development	September 23, 2014	September 26, 2014	September 23, 2014	79 FR 58229	2014-23228	
190	13678	Conversion Authority for Criminal Investigators (Special Agents) of the Bureau of Alcohol, Tobacco, Firearms, and Explosives	October 3, 2014	October 8, 2014	October 3, 2014	79 FR 60949	2014-24218	
191	13679	Establishing an Emergency Board To Investigate a Dispute Between the Southeastern Pennsylvania Transportation Authority and Its Locomotive Engineers Represented by the Brotherhood of Locomotive Engineers and Trainmen	October 10, 2014	October 17, 2014	October 10, 2014	79 FR 62323	2014-24851	
192	13680	Ordering the Selected Reserve and Certain Individual Ready Reserve Members of the Armed Forces to Active Duty	October 16, 2014	October 23, 2014	October 16, 2014	79 FR 63287	2014-25292	
193	13681	Improving the Security of Consumer Financial Transactions	October 17, 2014	October 23, 2014	October 17, 2014	79 FR 63489	2014-25439	
194	13682	Closing of Executive Departments and Agencies of the Federal Government on Friday, December 26, 2014	December 5, 2014	December 10, 2014	December 5, 2014	79 FR 73457	2014-29121	
195	13683	Amendments to Executive Orders 11030, 13653, and 13673	December 11, 2014	December 16, 2014	December 11, 2014	79 FR 75039	2014-29625	
196	13684	Establishment of the President's Task Force on 21st Century Policing	December 18, 2014	December 23, 2014	December 18, 2014	79 FR 76865	2014-30195	
197	13685	Blocking Property of Certain Persons and Prohibiting Certain Transactions With Respect to the Crimea Region of Ukraine	December 19, 2014	December 24, 2014	December 19, 2014	79 FR 77357	2014-30323	
198	13686	Adjustments of Certain Rates of Pay	December 19, 2014	December 24, 2014	December 19, 2014	79 FR 77361	2014-30363	

=== 2015 ===
Relative No.	Absolute No.	Title / Description	Date signed	Date published	Date(s) effective	FR Citation	FR Doc. Number	Ref.
199	13687	Imposing Additional Sanctions With Respect To North Korea	January 2, 2015	January 6, 2015	January 2, 2015	80 FR 817	2015-00058	
200	13688	Federal Support for Local Law Enforcement Equipment Acquisition	January 16, 2015	January 22, 2015	January 16, 2015	80 FR 3451	2015-01255	
201	13689	Enhancing Coordination of National Efforts in the Arctic	January 21, 2015	January 26, 2015	January 21, 2015	80 FR 4189	2015-01522	
202	13690	Establishing a Federal Flood Risk Management Standard and a Process for Further Soliciting and Considering Stakeholder Input	January 30, 2015	February 4, 2015	January 30, 2015	80 FR 6425	2015-02379	
203	13691	Promoting Private Sector Cybersecurity Information Sharing	February 13, 2015	February 20, 2015	February 13, 2015	80 FR 9347	2015-03714	
204	13692	Blocking Property and Suspending Entry of Certain Persons Contributing to the Situation in Venezuela	March 8, 2015	March 11, 2015	March 8, 2015	80 FR 12747	2015-05677	
205	13693	Planning for Federal Sustainability in the Next Decade	March 19, 2015	March 25, 2015	March 19, 2015	80 FR 15869	2015-07016	
206	13694	Blocking the Property of Certain Persons Engaging in Significant Malicious Cyber-Enabled Activities	April 1, 2015	April 2, 2015	April 1, 2015	80 FR 18077	2015-07788	
207	13695	Termination of Emergency With Respect to the Risk of Nuclear Proliferation Created by the Accumulation of a Large Volume of Weapons-Usable Fissile Material in the Territory of the Russian Federation	May 26, 2015	May 28, 2015	May 26, 2015	80 FR 30331	2015-13055	
208	13696	2015 Amendments to the Manual for Courts-Martial, United States	June 17, 2015	June 22, 2015	June 17, 2015	80 FR 35781	2015-15495	
209	13697	Amendment to Executive Order 11155, Awards for Special Capability in Career and Technical Education	June 22, 2015	June 25, 2015	June 22, 2015	80 FR 36689	2015-15828	
210	13698	Hostage Recovery Activities	June 24, 2015	June 29, 2015	June 24, 2015	80 FR 37129	2015-16122	
211	13699	Establishing the Advisory Board on Toxic Substances and Worker Health	June 26, 2015	July 1, 2015	June 26, 2015	80 FR 37529	2015-16334	
212	13700	Establishing an Emergency Board To Investigate Disputes Between New Jersey Transit Rail and Certain of Its Employees Represented by Certain Labor Organizations	July 15, 2015	July 20, 2015	July 15, 2015	80 FR 43003	2015-17926	
213	13701	Delegation of Certain Authorities and Assignment of Certain Functions Under the Bipartisan Congressional Trade Priorities and Accountability Act of 2015	July 17, 2015	July 23, 2015	July 17, 2015	80 FR 43901	2015-18292	
214	13702	Creating a National Strategic Computing Initiative	July 29, 2015	August 3, 2015	July 29, 2015	80 FR 46177	2015-19183	
215	13703	Implementing the National HIV/AIDS Strategy for the United States for 2015-2020	July 30, 2015	August 4, 2015	July 30, 2015	80 FR 46181	2015-19209	
216	13704	Presidential Innovation Fellows Program	August 17, 2015	August 20, 2015	August 17, 2015	80 FR 50749	2015-20801	
217	13705	Designating the International Renewable Energy Agency as a Public International Organization Entitled To Enjoy Certain Privileges, Exemptions, and Immunities	September 3, 2015	September 9, 2015	September 3, 2015	80 FR 54403	2015-22888	
218	13706	Establishing Paid Sick Leave for Federal Contractors	September 7, 2015	September 10, 2015	September 7, 2015	80 FR 54697	2015-22998	
219	13707	Using Behavioral Science Insights To Better Serve the American People	September 15, 2015	September 18, 2015	September 15, 2015	80 FR 56365	2015-23630	
220	13708	Continuance or Reestablishment of Certain Federal Advisory Committees	September 30, 2015	October 5, 2015	September 30, 2015	80 FR 60271	2015-25489	
221	13709	National Security Medal	October 2, 2015	October 7, 2015	October 2, 2015	80 FR 60793	2015-25744	
222	13710	Termination of Emergency With Respect to the Actions and Policies of Former Liberian President Charles Taylor	November 12, 2015	November 16, 2015	November 12, 2015	80 FR 71677	2015-29403	
223	13711	Establishing an Emergency Board To Investigate Disputes Between New Jersey Transit Rail and Certain of Its Employees Represented by Certain Labor Organizations	November 12, 2015	November 17, 2015	November 12, 2015	80 FR 71921	2015-29498	
224	13712	Blocking Property of Certain Persons Contributing to the Situation in Burundi	November 22, 2015	November 25, 2015	November 22, 2015	80 FR 73633	2015-30191	
225	13713	Half-Day Closing of Executive Departments and Agencies of the Federal Government on Thursday, December 24, 2015	December 11, 2015	December 16, 2015	December 11, 2015	80 FR 78117	2015-31749	
226	13714	Strengthening the Senior Executive Service	December 15, 2015	December 18, 2015	December 15, 2015	80 FR 79223	2015-32060	
227	13715	Adjustments of Certain Rates of Pay	December 18, 2015	December 23, 2015	December 18, 2015	80 FR 80193	2015-32582	

=== 2016 ===
Relative No.	Absolute No.	Title / Description	Date signed	Date published	Date(s) effective	FR Citation	FR Doc. Number	Ref.
228	13716	Revocation of Executive Orders 13574, 13590, 13622, and 13645 With Respect to Iran, Amendment of Executive Order 13628 With Respect to Iran, and Provision of Implementation Authorities for Aspects of Certain Statutory Sanctions Outside the Scope of U.S. Commitments Under the Joint Comprehensive Plan of Action of July 14, 2015	January 16, 2016	January 21, 2016	January 16, 2016	81 FR 3693	2016-01325	
229	13717	Establishing a Federal Earthquake Risk Management Standard	February 2, 2016	February 5, 2016	February 2, 2016	81 FR 6405	2016-02475	
230	13718	Commission on Enhancing National Cybersecurity	February 9, 2016	February 12, 2016	February 9, 2016	81 FR 7441	2016-03038	
231	13719	Establishment of the Federal Privacy Council	February 9, 2016	February 16, 2016	February 9, 2016	81 FR 7959	2016-03141	
232	13720	Delegation of Certain Authorities and Assignment of Certain Functions Under the Trade Preferences Extension Act of 2015	February 26, 2016	March 2, 2016	February 26, 2016	81 FR 11087	2016-04770	
233	13721	Developing an Integrated Global Engagement Center To Support Government-wide Counterterrorism Communications Activities Directed Abroad and Revoking Executive Order 13584	March 14, 2016	March 17, 2016	March 14, 2016	81 FR 14685	2016-06250	
234	13722	Blocking Property of the Government of North Korea and the Workers' Party of Korea, and Prohibiting Certain Transactions With Respect to North Korea	March 15, 2016	March 18, 2016	March 15, 2016	81 FR 14941	2016-06355	
235	13723	Establishing the Inherent Resolve Campaign Medal	March 30, 2016	April 1, 2016	March 30, 2016	81 FR 19017	2016-07703	
236	13724	Amending Executive Order 12137	April 8, 2016	April 13, 2016	April 8, 2016	81 FR 22021	2016-08713	
237	13725	Steps to Increase Competition and Better Inform Consumers and Workers to Support Continued Growth of the American Economy	April 15, 2016	April 20, 2016	April 15, 2016	81 FR 23417	2016-09346	
238	13726	Blocking Property and Suspending Entry Into the United States of Persons Contributing to the Situation in Libya	April 19, 2016	April 21, 2016	April 19, 2016	81 FR 23562	2016-09483	
239	13727	Facilitation of a Presidential Transition	May 6, 2016	May 11, 2016	May 6, 2016	81 FR 29465	2016-11300	
240	13728	Wildland-Urban Interface Federal Risk Mitigation	May 18, 2016	May 20, 2016	May 18, 2016	81 FR 32221	2016-12155	
241	13729	A Comprehensive Approach to Atrocity Prevention and Response	May 18, 2016	May 23, 2016	May 18, 2016	81 FR 32611	2016-12307	
242	13730	2016 Amendments to the Manual for Courts-Martial, United States	May 20, 2016	May 26, 2016	May 20, 2016	81 FR 33331	2016-12579	
243	13731	Global Entrepreneurship	June 24, 2016	June 29, 2016	June 24, 2016	81 FR 42221	2016-15542	
244	13732	United States Policy on Pre- and Post-Strike Measures To Address Civilian Casualties in U.S. Operations Involving the Use of Force	July 1, 2016	July 7, 2016	July 1, 2016	81 FR 44483	2016-16295	
245	13733	Delegation of Certain Authorities and Assignment of Certain Functions Under the Trade Facilitation and Trade Enforcement Act of 2015	July 22, 2016	July 27, 2016	July 22, 2016	81 FR 49513	2016-17945	
246	13734	Amending Executive Order 13675 To Expand Membership on the President's Advisory Council on Doing Business in Africa	August 3, 2016	August 8, 2016	August 3, 2016	81 FR 52321	2016-18872	
247	13735	Providing an Order of Succession Within the Department of the Treasury	August 12, 2016	August 17, 2016	August 12, 2016	81 FR 54709	2016-19723	
248	13736	Providing an Order of Succession Within the Department of Veterans Affairs	August 12, 2016	August 17, 2016	August 12, 2016	81 FR 54711	2016-19724	
249	13737	Providing an Order of Succession Within the Environmental Protection Agency	August 12, 2016	August 17, 2016	August 12, 2016	81 FR 54713	2016-19745	
250	13738	Amendment to Executive Order 13673	August 23, 2016	August 26, 2016	August 23, 2016	81 FR 58807	2016-20713	
251	13739	Termination of Emergency With Respect to the Situation in or in Relation to Côte d'Ivoire	September 14, 2016	September 16, 2016	September 14, 2016	81 FR 63673	2016-22454	
252	13740	2016 Amendments to the Manual for Courts-Martial, United States	September 16, 2016	September 22, 2016	September 16, 2016	81 FR 65175	2016-22962	
253	13741	Amending Executive Order 13467 To Establish the Roles and Responsibilities of the National Background Investigations Bureau and Related Matters	September 29, 2016	October 4, 2016	September 29, 2016	81 FR 68289	2016-24066	
254	13742	Termination of Emergency With Respect to the Actions and Policies of the Government of Burma	October 7, 2016	October 12, 2016	October 7, 2016	81 FR 70593	2016-24847	
255	13743	Charitable Fundraising	October 13, 2016	October 18, 2016	October 13, 2016	81 FR 71571	2016-25288	
256	13744	Coordinating Efforts To Prepare the Nation for Space Weather Events	October 13, 2016	October 18, 2016	October 13, 2016	81 FR 71573	2016-25290	
257	13745	Delegation of Function to the Director of the Office of Personnel Management	October 31, 2016	November 3, 2016	October 31, 2016	81 FR 76493	2016-26753	
258	13746	Advancing the Goals of the Power Africa Initiative to Expand Access to Electricity in Sub- Saharan Africa Through the Establishment of the President's Power Africa Working Group	November 3, 2016	November 8, 2016	November 3, 2016	81 FR 78697	2016-27156	
259	13747	Advancing the Global Health Security Agenda To Achieve a World Safe and Secure From Infectious Disease Threats	November 4, 2016	November 9, 2016	November 4, 2016	81 FR 78701	2016-27171	
260	13748	Establishing a Community Solutions Council	November 16, 2016	November 21, 2016	November 16, 2016	81 FR 83619	2016-28203	
261	13749	Providing for the Appointment in the Competitive Service of Certain Employees of the Foreign Service	November 29, 2016	December 2, 2016	November 29, 2016	81 FR 87391	2016-29165	
262	13750	Providing for the Appointment of Alumni of the Fulbright U.S. Student Program, the Benjamin A. Gilman International Scholarship Program, and the Critical Language Scholarship Program to the Competitive Service	November 29, 2016	December 2, 2016	November 29, 2016	81 FR 87393	2016-29169	
263	13751	Safeguarding the Nation From the Impacts of Invasive Species	December 5, 2016	December 8, 2016	December 5, 2016	81 FR 88609	2016-29519	
264	13752	Relating to the Implementation of the Convention on the International Recovery of Child Support and Other Forms of Family Maintenance	December 8, 2016	December 13, 2016	December 8, 2016	81 FR 90181	2016-30101	
265	13753	Amending the Order of Succession in the Department of Homeland Security	December 9, 2016	December 14, 2016	December 9, 2016	81 FR 90667	2016-30272	
266	13754	Northern Bering Sea Climate Resilience	December 9, 2016	December 14, 2016	December 9, 2016	81 FR 90669	2016-30277	
267	13755	Providing an Order of Succession Within the Department of Labor	December 23, 2016	December 30, 2016	December 23, 2016	81 FR 96329	2016-31792	
268	13756	Adjustments of Certain Rates of Pay	December 27, 2016	December 30, 2016	December 27, 2016	81 FR 97099	2016-31875	
269	13757	Taking Additional Steps to Address the National Emergency With Respect to Significant Malicious Cyber-Enabled Activities	December 28, 2016	January 3, 2017	December 28, 2016	82 FR 1	2017-31922	

=== 2017 ===
Relative No.	Absolute No.	Title / Description	Date signed	Date published	Date(s) effective	FR Citation	FR Doc. Number	Ref.
270	13758	Amending Executive Order 11016 To Update Eligibility Criteria for Award of the Purple Heart	January 12, 2017	January 17, 2017	January 12, 2017	82 FR 5321	2017-01164	
271	13759	Designating the World Organisation for Animal Health as a Public International Organization Entitled To Enjoy Certain Privileges, Exemptions, and Immunities	January 12, 2017	January 17, 2017	January 12, 2017	82 FR 5323	2017-01168	
272	13760	Exclusions From the Federal Labor-Management Relations Program	January 12, 2017	January 17, 2017	January 12, 2017	82 FR 5325	2017-01169	
273	13761	Recognizing Positive Actions by the Government of Sudan and Providing for the Revocation of Certain Sudan-Related Sanctions	January 13, 2017	January 18, 2017	January 13, 2017	82 FR 5331	2017-01197	
274	13762	Providing an Order of Succession Within the Department of Justice	January 13, 2017	January 19, 2017	January 13, 2017	82 FR 7619	2017-01487	
275	13763	Providing an Order of Succession Within the Environmental Protection Agency	January 13, 2017	January 19, 2017	January 13, 2017	82 FR 7621	2017-01489	
276	13764	Amending the Civil Service Rules, Executive Order 13488, and Executive Order 13467 To Modernize the Executive Branch-Wide Governance Structure and Processes for Security Clearances, Suitability and Fitness for Employment, and Credentialing, and Related Matters	January 17, 2017	January 23, 2017	January 17, 2017	82 FR 8115	2017-01623	

== See also ==
- Executive order
- List of executive actions by George W. Bush, EO #13198–13488 (2001–2009)
- List of executive actions by Donald Trump
- List of executive orders in the first Trump presidency, EO #13765–13984 (2017–2021)

== Sources ==
- Relyea, Harold C. (November 26, 2008). "Presidential Directives: Background and Overview" (PDF). Congressional Research Service. Order Code 98-611 GOV.
