= Promsvyazbank =

Russian bank

Promsvyazbank PJSC
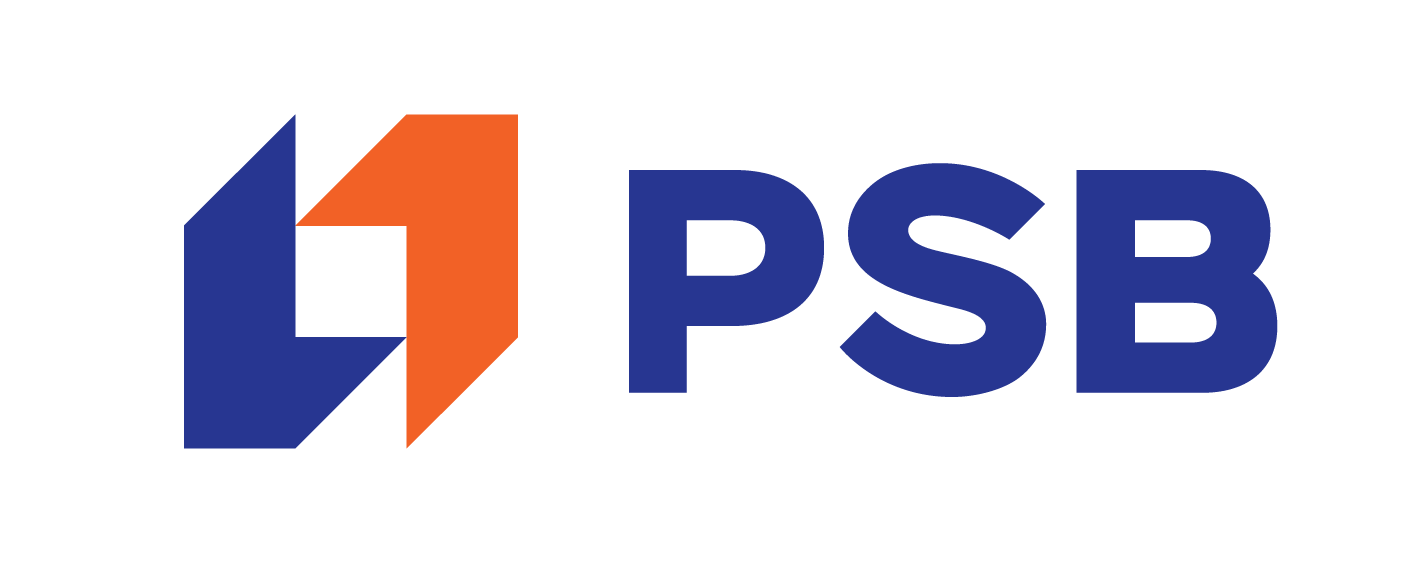

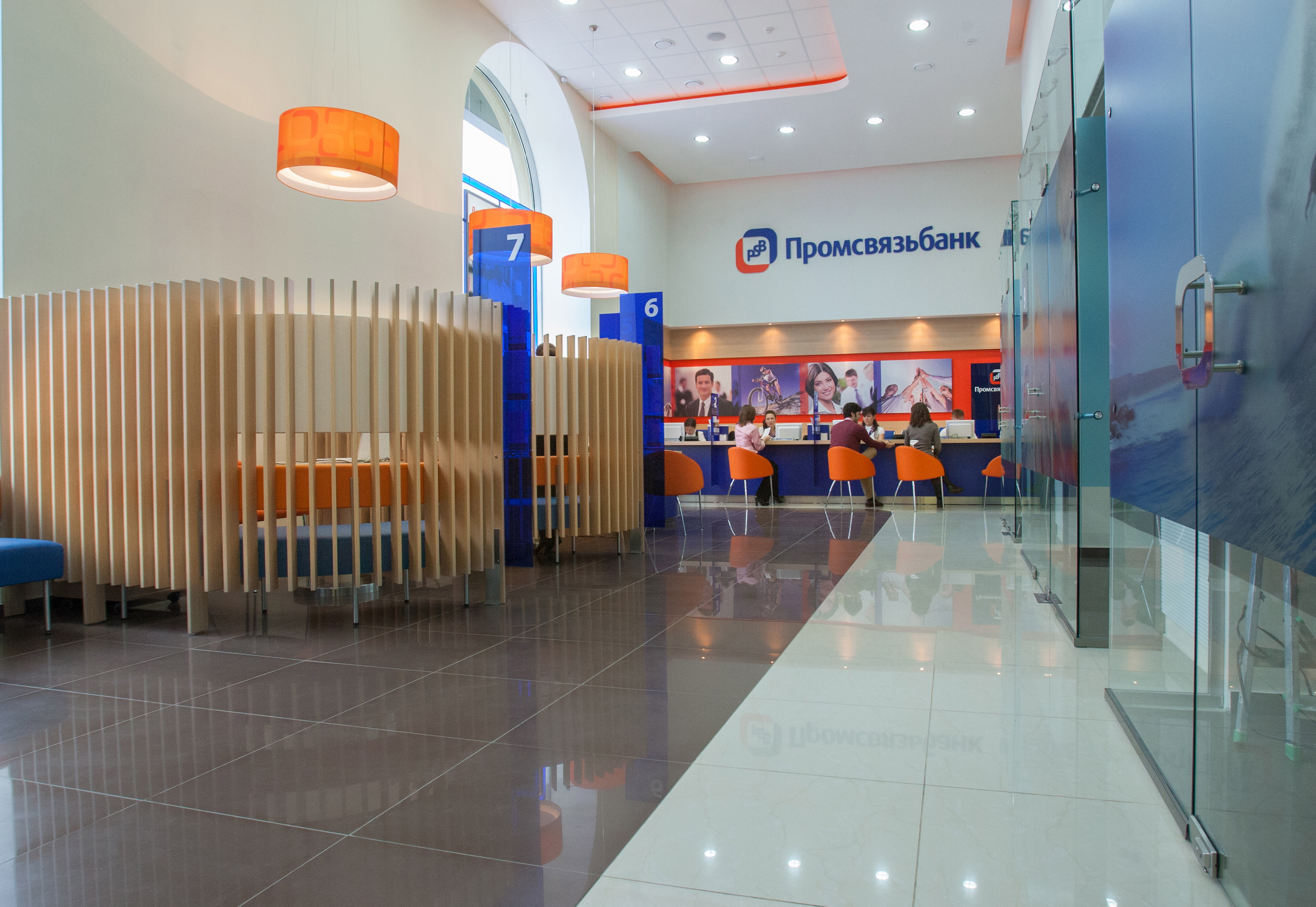
- An office in Moscow
- Native name: Промсвязьбанк
- Type: State-owned enterprise
- Industry: banking
- Founded: 12 May 1995; 31 years ago
- Headquarters: Moscow, Russia
- Key people: Petr Fradkov
- Products: Financial services
- Revenue: RUB 104.091 billion (2020)
- Net income: RUB 25.944 (2020)
- Total assets: RUB 2764.177 billion (2020)
- Total equity: RUB 248.423 billion (2020)
- Owner: Russian Federation
- Number of employees: 10,000 (2021)
- Rating: Ba3 (Moody's; now no rating), BB− (S&P; now no rating) (2017)
- Website: www.psbank.ru

Promsvyazbank PJSC (PSB; Russian: ПАО "Промсвязьбанк") is a state-owned, formerly private Russian bank from Moscow. It was owned by oligarchs Dmitry Ananyev and his brother Alexei Ananyev. As of 2012, it was the 10th-largest bank in Russia by assets.

The bank was established in May 1995 by the Ananyev brothers, the owners of Technoserv, the largest systems integrator in the CIS. Its first customers were major telecom companies such as Rostelecom. Between 2006 and 2012, a 15.32% stake was owned by Commerzbank. In February 2010, an 11.75% stake was acquired by the EBRD.

By February 2016, the bank provided services to more than 100,000 corporate and over 2 million private customers. In 2018, the Russian government nationalized the bank, and prosecuted its former owners, Interpol found the prosecution to be politically motivated. Promsvayzbank was officially designated as a supporting bank of the Russian defense sector.

In response to the prelude to the Russian invasion of Ukraine, specifically the recognition of the Luhansk People's Republic and Donetsk People's Republic as independent from Ukraine by Russian president Vladimir Putin on February 21, 2022, Promsvyazbank has been the target of sanctions from multiple countries including Canada, the United Kingdom, and the United States. In 2024, the head of the Moldovan Police, Viorel Cernăuțeanu, stated that Promsvyazbank was involved in a vote buying scheme in Moldova.

== Early history ==
Promsvyazbank was founded in 1995 in Moscow by brothers Aleksey Ananyev and Dmitry Ananyev. Initially engaged in services of telecommunication companies, it later began to develop as a universal bank. By the mid-2000s, it entered the top-20 Russian banks.

In the period from 2004 to 2007, the total capital of the bank increased sixfold – from 6 to 36.3 billion rubles, assets – from 41.9 billion to 293.2 billion rubles. Offices of Promsvyazbank appeared in 90 settlements of Russia.

In 2014, the Bank of Russia recognized Promsvyazbank as one of the three systemically important banks.

From 2006 to 2012, one of the PSB shareholders was the top German Commerzbank, with a 15.32% share. In 2012, Commerzbank had to withdraw as a shareholder, however, and sell its shares to the founders. In 2010, the European Bank for Reconstruction and Development became a shareholder, buying 11.75% of the shares.

At the end of 2016, Promsvyazbank's assets amounted to 1.2 trillion rubles, the corporate loan portfolio amounted to 676 billion rubles, and the retail one – 69 billion rubles. The bank is among the top-10 Russian banks in terms of attracting private deposits.

Promsvyazbank actively provided loans to the corporate sector. However, after the crises of 2008 and 2014, the quality of these loans declined. The bank began to seize enterprise debtors, hoping to recover money from their resale. At about the same time, Promsvyazbank began to actively finance projects of its owners, which in the end became one of the reasons for its nationalization.

== Nationalization ==
Promsvyazbank's problems began in 2017. The trigger was a letter to clients from an analyst of Alfa-Capital, Sergei Gavrilov, in which Gavrilov named Promsvyazbank as being among four problem banks threatened by restructuring. In autumn, the presence of problems at the bank was confirmed by Moody's.

In December 2017, the Central Bank of Russia (CBR) introduced a temporary administration at Promsvyazbank, and then announced that it had found signs of illegal transactions, including the disappearance of credit folders worth more than 100 billion rubles. Soon the Ananyev brothers, the bank's co-founders, left Russia. The new administration has been requesting compensation from the ex-owners for the damage it claims to have suffered because of their mismanagement. In 2019 their property (planes, cars, paintings, etc.) were seized by court order. Later, the Ananyevs were charged with multi-million-dollar embezzlement, were arrested in absentia and subsequently added to Interpol’s wanted list. In December 2020, Interpol removed the brothers from its list, finding the Russian prosecution to be politically motivated. Three years later, Dmitry Ananyev, one of the co-founders of PSB, said that the plan to nationalize the bank and use it for the needs of the defense industry originated from the CBR back in 2015. According to the banker, pressure was put on him, including threats to open a criminal case or even to kill him.

In January 2018, the Central Bank recognized the capital base of PSB as negative and reduced its authorized capital to 1 ruble. PSB was delisted from the Moscow Stock Exchange. In March, the State Duma adopted a law according to which the PSB would become the property of the state. An additional share issuance was carried out in the amount of RUB 113.4 billion. These shares were redeemed at a nominal price by the state Deposit Insurance Agency of Russia, which transferred them to the Federal Agency for State Property Management in May 2018. According to the decision of the Russian government, PSB has become a captive bank for the Russian defense sector. Petr Fradkov, the eldest son of the former prime minister (2004-07) and former foreign intelligence chief (2007-16) Mikhail Fradkov, was appointed head of the bank (in the position of chairman of the interim administration).

In September, the Central Bank terminated the temporary administration. Petr Fradkov became the chairman of the PSB.

As a result of the reorganization measures, by the end of 2018, Promsvyazbank had RUB 149.5 billion of equity capital and RUB 1280.8 billion of assets.

== Sanctions and Ukraine crisis ==
Due to the transformation of Promsvyazbank into a "defense" bank, the Russian authorities had concerns about US sanctions. A number of steps have been taken to protect customers and the bank's management. Customers were asked to sell or withdraw foreign securities, and convert or withdraw dollar deposits. The composition of the bank's board was classified, Petr Fradkov is the "sole executive body". (He said that he was not afraid of personal sanctions.)

On February 21, 2022, Russian president Vladimir Putin signed a decree declaring the Luhansk People's Republic and Donetsk People's Republic independent from Ukraine. This prompted several countries to ready and impose economic sanctions on companies and individuals deemed close to the Russian government. On February 22, 2022, British prime minister Boris Johnson announced sanctions against five banks, including Promsvyazbank. United States President Joe Biden also imposed sanctions against multiple Russian individuals and companies, including Promsvyazbank. The Canadian prime minister Justin Trudeau has also announced he was moving to impose sanctions as well. In addition, the bank has been sanctioned by New Zealand.

== Vote buying in Moldova ==
On 24 October 2024, the head of the Moldovan Police, Viorel Cernăuțeanu, stated that 39 million dollars since September, 15 million that month and 24 million in October, had been transferred to over 138,000 people in Moldova through Promsvyazbank, banned in the country, in order to "corrupt" the Moldovan electorate. The number of people that had benefited from this system would be much greater according to him, as these people would have received money not only for themselves but also for members of their family. As he stated, this system would have started in late spring, and was carried out through applications that people downloaded with instructions from interactive chatbots on Telegram. This would allow them to enter the system and benefit from transfers from Promsvyazbank. Cernăuțeanu stated that in October up until that moment, Moldovan police had documented and stopped the activity of such bots in 97 Telegram groups.

This happened in the context of the first round of the 2024 Moldovan presidential election, in which President of Moldova and pro-European candidate Maia Sandu did not obtain an outright majority of votes; and in that of the 2024 Moldovan European Union membership constitutional referendum, which narrowly passed with slightly over 50% of votes. Sandu had stated following the two votes that Moldova had experienced an unprecedented attack by "criminal groups, together with foreign forces" which had sought to buy 300,000 votes.

In 2025, in the context of the Moldovan parliamentary election that year, an undercover BBC World Service reporter was promised 3,000 Moldovan lei (US$170, £125) a month, sent from Promsvyazbank, to post false allegations of government misdeeds on TikTok and Facebook using ChatGPT in the run-up to the election.

== Modern history ==
- In 2018, the Russian government initiated the transfer of loans issued to defense enterprises to Promsvyazbank. In the summer of 2019, Petr Fradkov estimated their volume at 250 billion rubles.
- In December 2019, a law was passed that finally endowed PSB with the functions of a supporting bank for the military-industrial complex. This law prohibited the sale of state-owned shares of the bank.
- In December 2019, Promsvyazbank became the owner of more than 99% of Sviaz Bank. This bank had a wide network of branches, was in the top 30 in terms of private deposits, and in the top 10 in terms of mortgage lending. The bank has been under restructuring since 2008, its shares were on the balance sheet of the state Vnesheconombank. To transfer Sviaz Bank to a new owner, its shares were first transferred to the Federal Agency for State Property Management. Then Promsvyazbank carried out an additional issue of its shares, which were exchanged for the shares of Sviaz Bank. In May 2020, Sviaz Bank was fully incorporated into Promsvyazbank. This increased its assets by RUB 200 billion, and its capital grew by RUB 22 billion.
- In December 2020, Promsvyazbank acquired Roscosmosbank, a subsidiary bank of Roscosmos. According to media reports, the bank was sold at the price of the authorized capital (4.19 billion rubles), and as payment Promsvyazbank issued promissory notes with maturity until 2032. The merger was completed by May 2021. The equity of Promsvyazbank increased by 33 billion rubles. 120 subsidiaries of Roscosmos and about 200 thousand employees became its clients. The branch network of Promsvyazbank was replenished with branches at cosmodromes, including Baikonur.
- According to the report for 2020, the total assets of Promsvyazbank as of December 31 were RUB 2764 billion, total equity was RUB 248.4 billion, operating income was RUB 104.1 billion and net profit was RUB 25.9 billion.
- In March 2021, Promsvyazbank proposed to the government to create a “capitalization fund” to finance large projects. As conceived by the initiators, when financing projects approved by the state, banks can attract endowment capital from a special fund in the amount of 2 trillion rubles. The proposal is being studied at the Russian Ministry of Industry and Trade.
- In April 2021, the Bank of Russia approved a plan to transfer the rehabilitated MInBank to Promsvyazbank. Bad assets will be transferred to Trust Bank.
- In the April 2021 rating of The World’s Best Banks by Forbes, PSB was ranked 14th among Russian banks.
- In 2022, Government of Russia sets up to increase bank's capital by 13 billion 731 million rubles from public funds.
- In February 2022, the bank acquired non-State pension fund "Gefest" from "United Metallurgical Corporation".
- In 2022, Promsvyazbank increased its authorized capital to 175.2 billion rubles.
- On March 21, 2023, Promsvyazbank took over the Moscow Industrial Bank, which had been undergoing a reorganization procedure since 2019. The capital of the bank, which accumulated significant losses, was reduced to 1 ruble, transferred from the jurisdiction of the Bank of Russia to the Deposit Insurance Agency, then 100% of the shares of the MInB passed into the possession of PSB.

== See also ==
- A7 (company)
