= Sunlight (jewelry company) =

Russian jewelry company

- Industry: Jewelry
- Founded: 1995; 31 years ago
- Founder: Sergey Gribnyakov, Mikhail Maslovsky
- Headquarters: Moscow, Russia
- Number of locations: 350 (2020)
- Area served: Russia
- Key people: Maksim Khivintsev (CEO); Sergey Gribnyakov (Chairman)
- Products: Discount jewelry
- Brands: Sunlight, Sergey Gribnyakov
- Revenue: 34 billion rubles (2020)
- Net income: 2.8 billion rubles (2020)
- Number of employees: 2,000 (2015)
- Website: sunlight.net

Sunlight is a Russian jewelry company that focuses on the low-cost segment of the market and produces compact (thus requiring a lower volume of precious metals) jewelry with small jewels or diamond chips instead of full diamonds to reduce price. The company operates a chain of stores across Russia and also sells online. The company's facilities are located in Kostroma, Novosibirsk, Ekaterinburg, Krasnoyarsk, Izhevsk, Moscow, and Saint Petersburg.

As of 2020, the company reported 34 billion rubles in revenue and 2.8 billion rubles in net income. According to Infoline Analytics, by mid-2022, the company had a market share of 13.7%. In 2023, the company increased its total sales to 78 billion rubles.

== History ==
In 1995, Novocherkassk entrepreneurs Sergey Gribnyakov and Mikhail Maslovsky (later joined by Alexey Konovalov) founded a distribution firm "Onyx". In mid-2005, the partners introduced their own brand Sunlight, which was offered in branded zones at other retailers. In 2009, the first Sunlight store opened in Moscow. In the following years, the focus on the low-cost segment allowed the company to grow despite the 2008 financial crisis and the Russian financial crisis (2014–2016).

Through the company's wide distribution network, Sunlight jewelry was sold in roughly 1,000 jewelry stores nationwide. From 2011 to 2015, the company offered a low-cost and low-risk franchise without lump-sum fees and royalty payments. It helped the company to expand its own chain: in 2014, 258 stores totaled 6 billion rubles in revenue, making it the 6th largest jewelry retailer in Russia.

By 2020, the company operated 350 stores and an online marketplace that offered Sunlight along with other jewelry brands, such as Sokolov, Aethet, Bronnitsky Jeweller, and more. In 2023 the company announced the launch of its dating service integrated into the retail chain's app.

== Controversy ==
Sunlight became widely known for aggressive marketing, including fake clearance sales "due to store closure", which even became an internet meme. In 2019 and 2020, the company was fined by the Federal Antimonopoly Service for misleading ads.

== Owners and directors ==
The Sunlight store chain belongs to LLC "Sunlight" ("Солнечный свет"). Owners is Sergey Gribnyakov.
