= Dmitry Ananyev =

Russian politician (born 1969)

- Дмитрий Ананьев
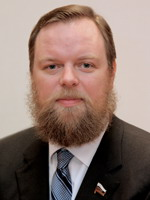
- Ananyev in 2008

Senator from the Yamalo-Nenets Autonomous Okrug
- In office 26 September 2006 – 10 July 2013
- Preceded by: Boris Gutin
- Succeeded by: Aleksandr Yermakov

Personal details
- Born: Dmitry Ananyev; 19 February 1969 (age 57) Moscow, Soviet Union
- Education: Moscow Aviation Institute

Dmitry Nikolaevich Ananyev (Russian: Дмитрий Николаевич Ананьев; born 19 February 1969) is a Russian politician who served as a senator from the Yamalo-Nenets Autonomous Okrug from 2006 to 2013.

== Career ==
Dmitry Ananyev was born on 19 February 1969 in Moscow. Later he graduated from the Moscow Aviation Institute. From 1990 to 1996, he was the Deputy Marketing Director, deputy chairman of the board, Deputy Chairman of the Technoserv A/S Advisory Council. From 1995 to 2006, Ananyev served as chairman of the Board of Directors of Promsvyazbank. In 2005, he was appointed an advisor to the Chairman of the Federation Council Sergey Mironov. From 2006 to 2013, Ananyev represented the Yamalo-Nenets Autonomous Okrug in the Federation Council.

In 2019, Dmitry and his brother Alexey were arrested in absentia in Russia. They are accused of embezzlement on an especially large scale from Promsvyazbank. As of 2021, both brothers resided outside of Russia.

== Family ==
His wife is Lyudmila Ananyeva; the couple has three sons and two daughters.
