= Petr Fradkov =

Russian economist and banker

- Пётр Фрадков
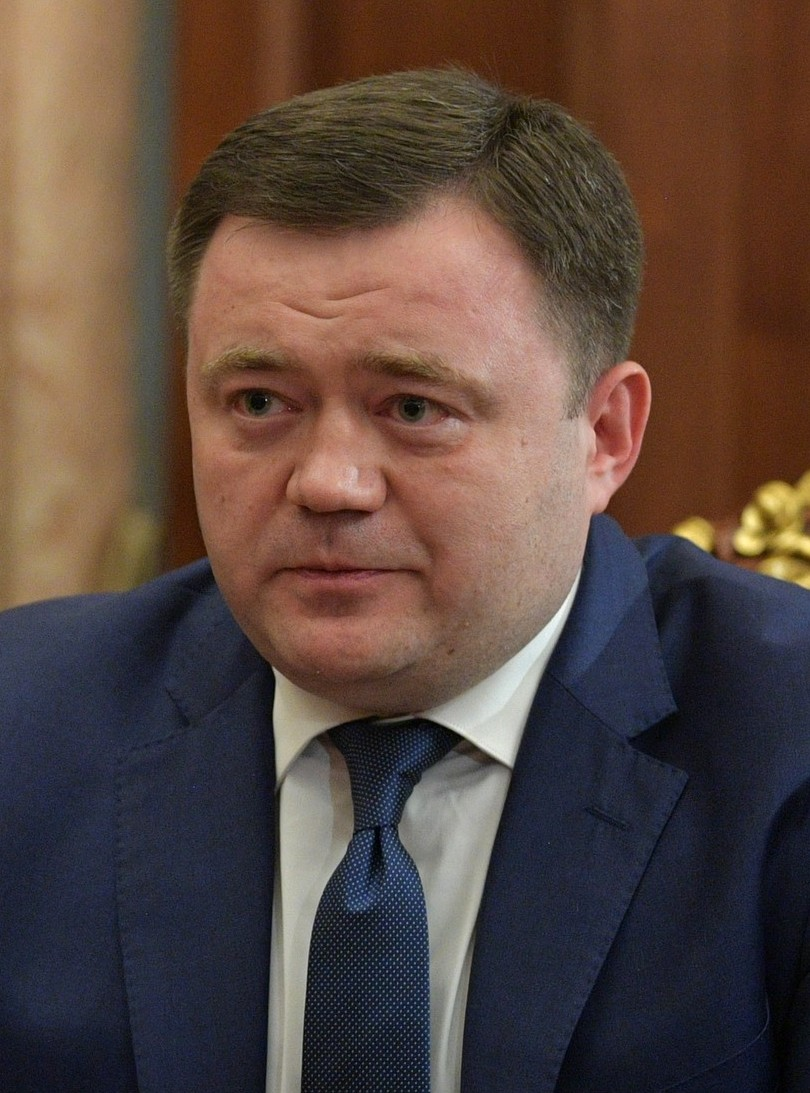
- Fradkov in 2019
- Born: Petr Mikhaylovich Fradkov; 1978 (age 47–48); Moscow, Russia
- Education: Moscow State Institute of International Relations; Kingston Business School; Russian Presidential Academy of National Economy and Public Administration
- Occupations: Economist, banker
- Spouse: Victoria Igorevna Fradkova
- Children: 1
- Father: Mikhail Fradkov
- Relatives: Pavel Fradkov (brother)
- Awards: Medal of the Order "For Merit to the Fatherland"

Petr Mikhaylovich Fradkov (Russian: Пётр Михайлович Фрадков; born 1978) is a Russian economist and banker serving as the chairman and CEO of Promsvyazbank and the general director of the Russian Export Center. Chairman of the Russian Athletics Federation (since 2024).

== Early life and education ==
Fradkov was born in 1978 in Moscow. He is the son of Mikhail Fradkov. Fradkov graduated from the Moscow State Institute of International Relations in 2000. In 2007, he earned a Master of Business Administration (MBA) from the Kingston Business School. Fradkov completed a second MBA and a candidate of economic sciences degree at the Russian Presidential Academy of National Economy and Public Administration.

== Career ==
Fradkov joined the VEB.RF in 2000 working as a deputy representative in the United States. In 2004, he was the deputy director general of the Far Eastern Shipping Company. Fradkov returned to VEB in 2007. In 2011, Fradkov became the head of EXIAR. In April 2015, Fradkov became the general director of the Russian Export Center, a joint-stock company and subsidiary of VEB.

In 2018, Fradkov was appointed head of the Promsvyazbank (PSB) with Dmitri Pozhidaev serving as his deputy. Since 2018, Fradkov has worked to transform PSB into a bank that services the defense industry and supports state defense contracts. In his role as chairman and CEO of PSB, Fradkov has held working meetings with Vladimir Putin and participated in roundtable discussions in international forums in which he forecasts the PSB's long-term strategic plans for supporting the Russian defense industry.

In November 2020, Fradkov became lead of the Chuvash Regional Branch of SoyuzMash.

On February 22, 2022, U.S. president Joe Biden signed Executive Order 14024 sanctioning Fradkov for operating or having operated in the defense and related materiel and financial services sectors of the Russian Federation economy. He was sanctioned by the British government on 24 February 2022 for his role as CEO of Promsvyazbank.

On November 23, 2024, he was elected Chairman of the Russian Athletics Federation.

== Personal life ==
Fradkov is married to Victoria Igorevna Fradkova. She is a lecturer in the department of international relations and the foreign policy of Russia at the Moscow State Institute of International Relations. They have a daughter.

== Sanctions ==
The U.S. Treasury imposed personal economic sanctions on Petr Fradkov in response to actions in the Donetsk and Luhansk regions by the Promsvyazbank, where he is Chairman and CEO.

On 28 February 2022, in relation to the 2022 Russian invasion of Ukraine, the European Union blacklisted him, imposing an EU-wide travel ban and freezing all his assets.

He was sanctioned by Canada under the Special Economic Measures Act (S.C. 1992, c. 17) in relation to the Russian invasion of Ukraine for Grave Breach of International Peace and Security. and by the UK government in 2022 in relation to the Russo-Ukrainian War.

== Awards and honors ==
Fradkov received a Medal of the Order "For Merit to the Fatherland" Level II.
