= Sokolov (company) =

Russian jewelry company

- Industry: Jewelry
- Founded: 1993 in Krasnoye-na-Volge, Kostroma Oblast, Russia
- Founders: Alexey Sokolov, Elena Sokolov
- Headquarters: Russia
- Areas served: Russia, China, Europe
- Key people: Nikolay Polyakov (CEO)
- Production output: 20,000,000 pieces of jewellery (2022)
- Revenue: 60,540,357,000 Russian ruble (2024)
- Operating income: 12,002,185,000 Russian ruble (2024)
- Net income: 6,081,318,000 Russian ruble (2024)
- Parent: Welvart Group
- Website: sokolov.ru

Sokolov is a Russian jewelry company with production facilities in Kostroma, Krasnoye-na-Volge and Privolzhsk, and over 400 stores in Russia and abroad.

== History ==
The company was founded by Alexey and Elena Sokolov in 1993 in Krasnoye-na-Volge, Kostroma Oblast, Russia, a place known for jewelry manufacturing since the 19th century. The parents of the company founders used to work at Krasnoselskaya Jewellery Factory, established in Soviet times to consolidate smaller jewelry manufacturers.

In the early 2000s, Sokolovs constructed their own 10,000 sq m facility in Krasnoye-na-Volge, which produced golden rings, earrings, bracelets, and other jewelry with gemstones and sold them to retail chains and wholesale companies. By 2008, the company reached ₽ 1 billion in revenue. During the Great Recession in Russia, it opened an office and a showroom in Moscow and started the production of silver jewelry. Later in 2013, it also opened an office in Bern, Switzerland.

In 2014, the company took the name Sokolov, and Alexey and Elena's eldest son Artem was appointed as CEO. Since 2018, the company has developed its chain of mono-brand stores, which expanded from 20 stores in 2019 to over 400 in 2022. During the COVID-19 pandemic, the company embraced online commerce and launched an e-store and an app. It also received the status of a systemically important company from the Russian authorities.

In August 2025, Artem Sokolov sold the company. The new owner is Russian investor Anton Pak.

== Production ==
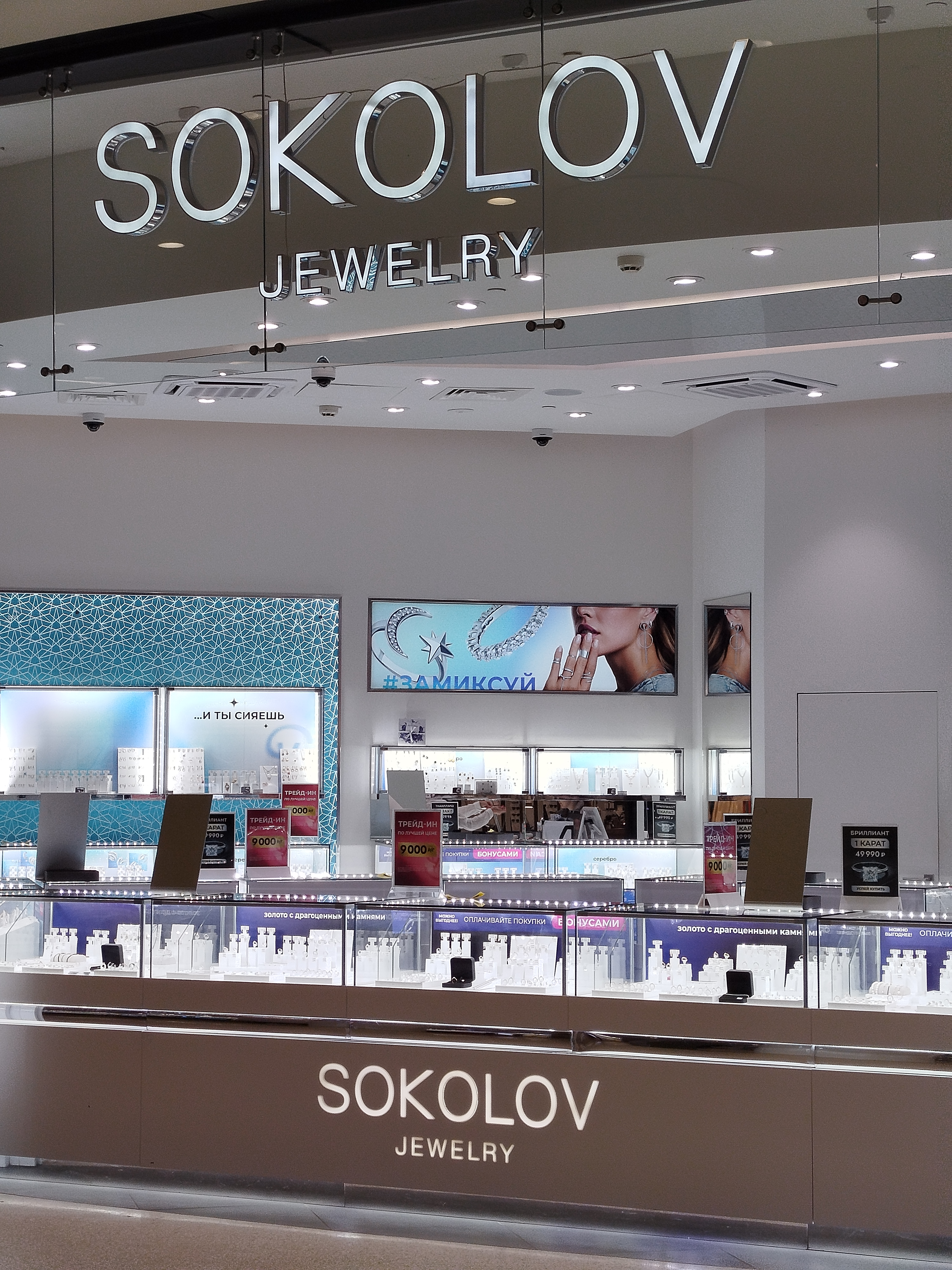
Sokolov shop in Moscow, Russia

Sokolov runs three production facilities in Kostroma, Krasnoye-na-Volge, and Privolzhsk (Ivanovo Oblast) and employs around 2,000 workers. The company produces around 20,000,000 pieces of jewelry per year (2022). It has an in-house design studio of 40 people, which generates up to 600 concepts each month and creases three seasonal collections a year (SS, FW, and "cruise").

By 2022, the company operated 416 mono-brand stores in Russia, franchise stores in Belarus, Kazakhstan, Kyrgyzstan, Moldova, and Romania, and ran a 3-store pilot in Shanghai, China. Sokolov jewelry is also sold in Europe and the US via Zalando, Amazon, and local distributors. The company specifically targets travel retail and sells jewelry in Dufry, Regstaer, and Arial duty-free and duty-paid stores.

In 2023, SOKOLOV's own production volumes increased by 34%, reaching 40 tons by weight of precious metals. The share of gold products in the total volume of production was 18%.

== Company ==
Sokolov is one of the largest jewelry companies in Russia. By mid-2022, it had the third largest store network among the jewelry retailers and had a market share of 10,5%, according to InfoLINE report. In 2022, the company reported ₽ 32 billion in revenue, with online sales totaling roughly 30%. In November 2022, Sokolov became the first Russian jewelry company to score a BBB+ rating from ACRA.

Since 2021, the company has planned an initial public offering. In November 2022, the company scheduled an IPO on MOEX for Q3 or Q4 2023. In December 2022, Sokolov issued 3-year bonds for ₽ 3 billion to support the growth of its retail chain and production facilities.

== Financial indicators ==
SOKOLOV's turnover in 2023 increased by 59% compared to 2022 and reached 51 billion rubles.
