= Krasnoselsky District, Kostroma Oblast =

Krasnoselsky District Красносельский район (Russian)
- District
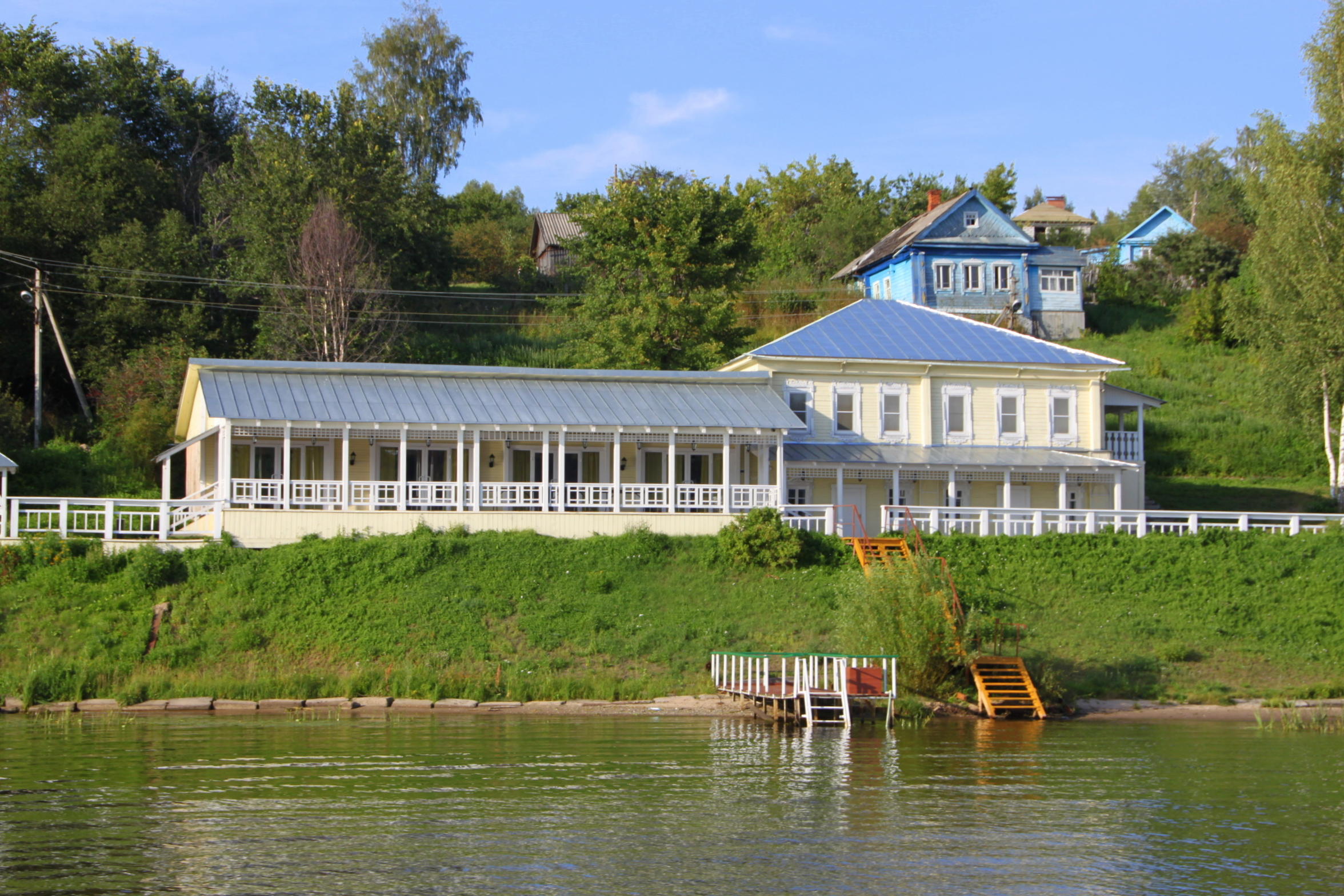
- Riverside in Krasnoselsky District

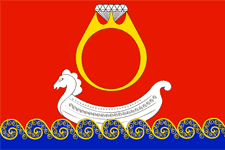
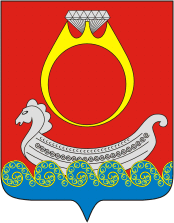
- Flag Coat of arms
- Location of Krasnoselsky District in Kostroma Oblast
- Coordinates: 57°31′N 41°14′E
- Country: Russia
- Federal subject: Kostroma Oblast
- Established: 1929
- Administrative center: Krasnoye-na-Volge

Area
  - Total: 950 km^{2} (370 sq mi)

Population (2010 Census)
  - Total: 17,845
  - Density: 19/km^{2} (49/sq mi)
  - Urban: 43.2%
  - Rural: 56.8%

Administrative structure
  - Administrative divisions: 1 Urban settlements (urban-type settlements), 8 Settlements
  - Inhabited localities: 1 urban-type settlements, 169 rural localities

Municipal structure
  - Municipally incorporated as: Krasnoselsky Municipal District
  - Municipal divisions: 1 urban settlements, 8 rural settlements
- Time zone: UTC+3 (MSK)
- OKTMO ID: 34616000
- Website: http://www.adm-krasnoe.ru/

Krasnoselsky District (Russian: Красносе́льский райо́н) is an administrative and municipal district (raion), one of the twenty-four in Kostroma Oblast, Russia. It is located in the southwest of the oblast. The area of the district is 950 square kilometers (370 sq mi). Its administrative center is the urban locality (an urban-type settlement) of Krasnoye-na-Volge. Population: 16,148 (2021 census); 17,845 (2010 census); 19,580 (2002 Census); 20,998 (1989 Soviet census). The population of Krasnoye-na-Volge accounts for 43.0% of the district's total population.
