= Executive Order 13653 =

2013 United States executive order

Executive Order 13653, “Preparing the United States for the Impacts of Climate Change” was issued by President Barack Obama on November 1, 2013. E.O. 13653 is the Federal Government's response to the rising issue of climate change. It was issued in order to prepare the Nation for the impending impacts on the environment brought by climate change and to implement risk management strategies to lessen the harm done by these impacts on the Nation.

E.O. 13653 mandates that the Federal Government, as well stakeholders, must manage these risks with deliberate preparation, cooperation, and coordination in order to effectively improve climate preparedness and resilience. With preparedness and resilience come a safer economy, infrastructure, environment, and supply of natural resources - allowing the continuation of department and agency operations, services, and programs. Agencies are called on to promote open lines of sharing and communication throughout all levels of government, make both informed and strategic decisions, quickly adapt and adjust future plans when needed, and to effectively prepare for the future by planning. On March 19, 2015, President Obama amended E.O. 13653 to require, among other things, that the Federal Government ensure that agency operations and facilities prepare for the impacts of climate change in specified ways.

E.O. 13653 attempts to plan for the following Environmental Impacts:

- High Temperatures
- Heavy Downpours
- Permafrost Thawing
- Ocean Acidification
- Sea Level Rise

President Donald Trump rescinded E.O. 13653 on March 28, 2017. In suspending the order, the executive branch told all federal agencies to stop considering climate preparedness in decision-making. Many departments fully complied with the order, especially those with recent executive appointments. Others, such as the Department of Defence, continued considering climate forecasts in decision-making.

On January 20, 2021, President Joe Biden issued E.O. 13990, “Protecting Public Health and the Environment and Restoring Science To Tackle the Climate Crisis,” which reinstated E.O. 13653.

Within hours of President Donald Trump's second term on January 20, 2025, he rescinded E.O. 13990.

== Sections ==
1. Policy
2. Modernizing Federal Programs to Support Climate Resilient Investment
3. Managing Lands and Waters for Climate Preparedness and Resilience
4. Providing Information, Data, and Tools for Climate Change Preparedness and Resilience
5. Federal Agency Planning for Climate Change Related Risk
6. Climate on Climate Preparedness and Resilience
7. State, Local, and Tribal Leaders Task Force on Climate Preparedness and Resilience
8. Definitions
9. General Provisions
