= Garantex =

Russian cryptocurrency exchange

- Industry: Cryptocurrency
- Founded: 2019; 7 years ago, in Moscow, Russia
- Founders: Stanislav Drugalev; Sergey Mendeleev
- Headquarters: Federation Tower

Garantex was a Russian cryptocurrency exchange. The company provided an exchange of Russian rubles to cryptocurrencies and international money transfers. It was tied to sanctioned individuals following the 2022 Russian invasion of Ukraine, including the Russian government, criminal organizations, and terrorist groups, such as Hamas and Hezbollah, among other illicit actors. It was co-founded in 2019 by Stanislav Drugalev, Sergey Mendeleev and Aleksandr Mira Serda.

After Tether blocked crypto wallets and seized clients' USDT in March 2025, the exchange announced restructuring and began the compensation process. Grinex, a cryptocurrency exchange launched in 2024 in Kyrgyzstan, is a successor of Garantex. On 14 August 2025, the U.S. Treasury's Office of Foreign Assets Control re-designated Garantex and sanctioned Grinex as its successor, saying Garantex had shifted its customers and funds to Grinex after the March 2025 takedown.

== History ==
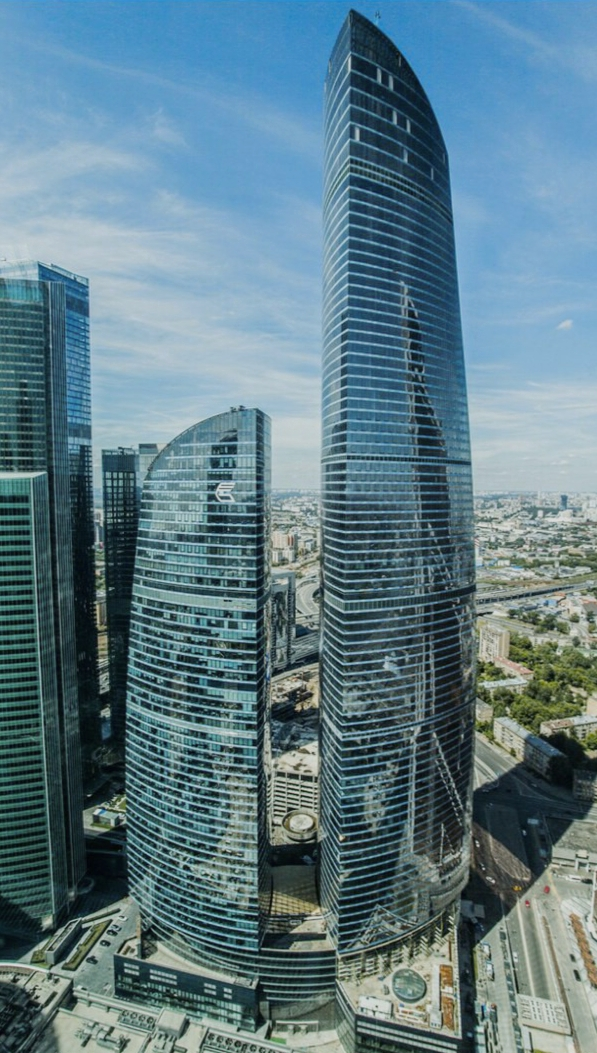
Garantex's successor, Grinex, is headquartered inside the Federation Tower, in Moscow, Russia.

Originally registered in Estonia as Garantex Europe, Garantex was co-founded in 2019 by Stanislav Drugalev and Sergey Mendeleev, establishing its offices in the Federation Tower.

In September 2020, Drugalev handed himself in to Russian authorities, giving information on criminal groups using Garantex in exchange for his freedom. Drugalev would move to Dubai, and was later found dead in February 2021. His possessions were held for ransom by an unknown person, demanding that Drugalev's wife pay for their return. She did not pay the ransom. Police in Dubai never gave a full explanation about Drugalev's death. Two months after Drugalev's death, executives met with Russia's Federal Security Service for the purpose of disclosing information about the exchange's users.

In February 2022, Garantex was stripped of their license to operate in Europe.

Three weeks after being sanctioned, Garantex partnered with Bithauz, based out of the United Arab Emirates. The company's Dubai office allowed customers to trade up to $5 million in Tether for dirhams or dollars. Bithauz was operated by a Dubai-based firm, MKAN Coin. MKAN Coin was registered by Mohammed Khalifa, a former Garantex executive and former senior official at the Dubai International Financial Centre, a few weeks after sanctions were placed on Garantex. MKAN Coin was part of a group of Emirati-based firms used by Khalifa to offer relocations services to Russians. MKAN Coin claimed that Bithauz was not operated by the firm, and Bithauz only referred clients to them.

Garantex would later announce withdrawal options in Turkey, Kazakhstan, other countries bordering Russia, and Marbella, a resort town in Spain popular amongst Russian tourists.

In October 2022, armed police raided Garantex's headquarters in the Federation Tower, leading to a temporary closure. The exchange would resume its operations the next day.

Palestinian militants partially financed their operations through Garantex prior to the October 7 attacks. Digital wallets controlled by the Palestinian Islamic Jihad received a portion of $93 million via Garantex.

In March 2024, an investigation led by the Eesti Ekspress and the International Consortium of Investigative Journalists revealed that within weeks of co-founder Stanislav Drugalev's death, he was replaced in corporate records by Irina Chernyavskaya, the romantic partner of Pavel Karavatsky, a shareholder linked to Rosneft, an oil company controlled by the Russian government. Karavatsky is a co-owner of the Russian firm, Fintech Corporation LLC (along with Aleksander Ntifo-Siao, a former shareholder of Garantex), which also owns 50% of a debt collection agency called Academy of Conflicts, alongside Alexander Tsarapkin, a gang leader who was convicted of extortion.

In December 2025, an investigation by Global Ledger revealed that Garantex had resumed operations. In particular, the platform resumed a system of paying out frozen funds in accounts. Researchers discovered new exchange wallets with Bitcoin and Ethereum containing $34 million in cryptocurrencies. By the end of 2025, at least $25 million had already been paid out to former users of the platform, despite account freezes and sanctions. Garantex continued to build a system of wallets for making payments and concealing the movement of funds. In particular, the exchange transferred 99.91% of its Ethereum reserves to crypto mixers such as Tornado Cash, which mix funds, concealing their origin.

=== Sanctions, allegations of money laundering ===
In April 2022, Garantex was placed under sanctions by the United States Department of the Treasury. Its Office of Foreign Assets Control (OFAC) stated that $100 million worth of transactions on the exchange were associated with criminals and darknet marketers (including Russian ransomware Conti and Hydra Market, a darkweb marketplace). Despite the sanctions, the exchange operated as one of the main channels for moving Russian money in and out of the country until its online infrastructure was taken down in March 2025. Garantex is also used by cybercriminals to launder their profits. The exchange is used to convert rubles into stablecoins (most commonly Tether), which are then traded for other currencies abroad. The exchange's digital wallets were designated by the United States Treasury in its sanctions, causing Garantex to regularly change its wallets to evade tracking software used by authorities and other exchanges. It sends crypto to its customers by moving multiple tokens through a long sequence of different wallets, each from different sources. Wallets used by the exchange are often abandoned after a single use. According to the company's website, Garantex allows withdrawals via Sberbank of Russia PJSC, Tinkoff Bank JSC, and Alfa-Bank AO cards, all of which are sanctioned by the United States and some of its allies.

Evgenia Burova, the communications director for Garantex, denied accusations of money laundering, claiming that the exchange uses a Russian-made compliance software. She also claimed the United States targeted Garantex based on a political agenda.

The transaction process has little to no trackable record, taking place within a network of Garantex's partners. Some locations of the exchange's partners include Dubai and Thailand. Customers are able to exchange up to $100 million rubles per transaction in person. By the time the company was sanctioned, Garantex had already moved its IT infrastructure from an undisclosed location into Russia. The company also claimed it held no assets in the United States, while its reserves of cryptocurrency were held in neutral jurisdictions.

In April 2022, previous Estonian cryptocurrency exchange license holder Garantex Europe OÜ (registered in Commercial Registry of Republic of Estonia under registry number 14850239) was sent to liquidation to famous liquidator Raul Pint. Company name was changed to Kihonzi Buzhaga OÜ. Regardless of the fact that Garantex no longer had a cryptocurrency license start from February 2022 or any ties to the new-named company under liquidation by Raul Pint, Garantex key persons continued its operations under this name and brand without any legal basis. This unauthorized activity later caused problems for completely unrelated parties, such as liquidator Raul Pint and others. Kihonzi Buzhaga OÜ ( previous Garantex Europe OÜ ) was deleted from Estonian Commercial Registry 20.03.2024 .

In July 2022, transactions totaled around $865 million, which was more than triple the amount processed in the month the exchange was sanctioned.

Garantex accounted for a majority of all sanction-related transactions in 2022.

Also in March 2024, the United States and United Kingdom announced a probe of over $20 billion in transactions that passed through Garantex, using the Tether stablecoin. There was no immediate suggestion of wrongdoing by Tether Holdings. In March 2025, the exchange was placed under sanctions by the European Union.

On 6 March 2025, Garantex's website and domains were seized by the United States Secret Service, while German and Finnish law enforcement seized the servers hosting its operations in an action coordinated with the United States Department of Justice, the FBI and Europol. The operation froze more than $26 million in cryptocurrency, and the Justice Department charged two administrators, Aleksej Besciokov, a Lithuanian national, and Aleksandr Mira Serda, a Russian national, with money laundering conspiracy; prosecutors said Garantex had processed roughly $96 billion in transactions since April 2019. Blockchain analytics firm Elliptic, which assisted the investigation, reported that North Korea's Lazarus Group had laundered more than $30 million through Garantex. Besciokov was arrested in India by a Kerala Police Civil Police Officer after the country's Central Bureau of Investigation issued a provisional arrest warrant against him at request of the United States. Besciokov died of a heart attack on August 31 in Tihar prison in Delhi, after agreeing to extradition to the United States.
