= Krasnoye-na-Volge =

Krasnoye-na-Volge Красное-на-Волге
- Urban-type settlement
- Interactive map of Krasnoye-na-Volge
- Location of Krasnoye-na-Volge Krasnoye-na-Volge (Kostroma Oblast)
- Coordinates: 57.5093°N 41.2378°E
- Country: Russia
- Federal subject: Kostroma Oblast
- Administrative district: Krasnoselsky District

Population (2010 Census)
  - Total: 7,706
  - Estimate (2025): 6,865 (−10.9%)
- Time zone: UTC+3 (MSK)
- Postal code: 157940
- OKTMO ID: 34616151051

Krasnoye-na-Volge (Russian: Кра́сное-на-Во́лге) is an urban locality (an urban-type settlement) in Krasnoselsky District of Kostroma Oblast, Russia. Population: 6,950 (2021 census); 7,706 (2010 census); 8,162 (2002 census); 8,598 (1989 Soviet census).
