= Executive Order 13581 =

2011 United States executive order

Executive Order 13581--Blocking Property of Transnational Criminal Organizations
- Blocking Property of Transnational Criminal Organizations
- Number: 13581
- President: Barack Obama
- Signed: July 24, 2011

Summary
- Levied sanctions against four criminal organizations which include freezing assets, barring ownership of American real estate, and implementation of travel bans

Executive Order 13581, titled Blocking Property of Transnational Criminal Organizations, was an executive order by United States president Barack Obama. The order authorized the U.S. Department of the Treasury to pursue sanctions against named transnational criminal organizations (TCOs).

== Entities ==
These are the organizations the sanctions are imposed against:

- The Brothers Circle
- Camorra
- Yakuza
- Los Zetas
